= Ministry of Higher Education and Scientific Research (United Arab Emirates) =

Ministry in the government of the United Arab Emirates

- وزارة التعليم العالي والبحث العلمي
- Logo of the Ministry of Higher Education and Scientific Research

Ministry overview
- Formed: 1976
- Dissolved: 19 December 2016
- Superseding Ministry: Ministry of Education
- Jurisdiction: Federal government of the United Arab Emirates
- Headquarters: Abu Dhabi, United Arab Emirates
- Ministry executives: Hamdan bin Mubarak Al Nahyan, Minister; Saeed H. Al Hassani, Undersecretary
- Website: mohesr.gov.ae

The Ministry of Higher Education and Scientific Research (MOHESR) was a ministry of the government in the United Arab Emirates (UAE). Established in 1976, the ministry had number of departments, including the Commission for Academic Accreditation (CAA), which provided institutional licensure and degree accreditation CAA for private universities and their academic programmes in the UAE. It housed NAPO (the National Admissions and Placement Office) which provided admissions and placement services for federal institutions of higher education, including United Arab Emirates University, Higher Colleges of Technology, and Zayed University, as well as the CEPA (Common Educational Proficiency Assessment) which assessed the English and math skills of MOHESR applicants to higher education. The ministry handled steps in the certificate attestation process, provides equivalency services for degrees and qualifications received outside of the UAE, and provided government scholarships for UAE nationals who wish to study overseas.

The ministry was merged with the Ministry of Education in the 19 December 2016 cabinet reshuffle.

Sheikh Hamdan bin Mubarak Al Nahyan was the last minister of higher education and scientific research.
