= Legal system of the United Arab Emirates =

The legal system in the United Arab Emirates is based on civil law and Sharia law in the personal status matters of Muslims and blood money compensation. Personal status matters of non-Muslims are based on civil law. The UAE constitution established a federal court system and allows all emirates to establish local courts systems. The emirates of Abu Dhabi, Dubai and Ras Al Khaimah have local court systems, while other emirates follow the federal court system. Some financial free trade zones in Abu Dhabi and Dubai have their own legal and court systems based on English common law; local businesses in both emirates are allowed to opt-in to the jurisdiction of common law courts for business contracts.

The justice system in the UAE has been characterized as opaque. International money launderers, criminals, corrupt political figures and sanctioned businesspeople are prevalent in the UAE where it is easy to hide wealth and engage in moneylaundering.

== Judicial structure ==
Under the Constitution of the United Arab Emirates, each emirate is allowed to establish its own judiciary or to follow the federal court system.

=== Federal system ===
The UAE federal system includes courts of first instance (trial court), courts of appeal and the Supreme Court.

The federal court system is the sole court system in the emirates of Ajman, Fujairah, Sharjah and Umm Al Quwain.

=== Local system ===
The local court systems (النظام القضائي المحلي) is in trial, appeal and cassation courts. The emirates of Abu Dhabi, Dubai and Ras Al Khaimah have their own courts of cassation.

=== Public Prosecution Structure ===
The Public Prosecution is organized hierarchically, led by the Attorney General, followed by Senior Advocates General, Advocates General, Directors of Prosecution (Chief Prosecutors), and Prosecutors. Each role has specific responsibilities and varying degrees of authority, with superiors exercising control and supervision over subordinates.

- Attorney General: The highest-ranking official in the Public Prosecution, overseeing its functions and exercising judicial and administrative supervision over all members.
- Senior Advocates General and Advocates General: Assist the Attorney General and perform tasks such as prosecuting cases, conducting investigations, representing the prosecution in courts, and handling appeals, particularly before the Court of Cassation.
- Chief Prosecutors: Responsible for filing or dismissing criminal cases, representing the prosecution in disciplinary trials, and managing criminal lawsuits.
- Prosecutors: Representing the Attorney General, they investigate criminal cases, determine legal characterizations, and decide on referrals to appropriate courts, ensuring evidence is substantiated or dismissing cases when evidence is insufficient.

== Legal processes ==
Criminal actions commence with a police investigation which is transferred to the prosecutor's office within 48 hours of filing a complaint. The prosecutor will then hear and document statements from witnesses to determine if charges will be pressed or dropped, which must be completed 14 days from receiving the case from the police. If the prosecutor determines charges should be pressed, the parties can proceed in hiring an attorney. All attorneys must be licensed to practice law in the court system where the case is being adjudicated, and must be approved by an official deed notarized by a notary public to try the case.

=== Trial procedures ===
Under the UAE constitution all defendants are innocent until proven guilty. Trials are public except for trials involving national security or cases where any evidence, testimonies or results the judge deems to be detrimental to societal morality. Criminal cases involve no juries. Also, all proceedings are delivered in Arabic, but non-Arabic speakers are entitled to translators. Defendants charged with felonies punishable by three to fifteen years in prison with no attorney may have counsel provided for them at the states discretion. UAE prosecutors and defense lawyers have the ability to withhold any investigation from each other involving the case. After a defendant is criminally indicted, they may be released on bail informally. Bail can include cash deposit, surrendering passports or an unsecured guarantee from a third party. Diyah or blood money qualifies as debt to a crime committed.

== Criminal law ==
The UAE penal code dictates legal punishments for all crimes and offence in all matters except for blood money amounts which are derived from Sharia law. Emirates with local courts systems have their own penal codes that are independent from the federal penal code.

=== Juveniles ===
Under UAE law, a juvenile is an individual under the age of 18. Capital punishment, imprisonment, or fines cannot be imposed as sentences against juveniles who commit criminal offences; however, judges have discretion to issue imprisonment sentences of up to ten years to juveniles over the age of 16. Judges can issue a variety of non-punitive sentences including reprimand, juvenile offenders under the supervision of a guardian, or rehabilitation. In 2015, 40% of all cases examined by prosecutors were related to offences committed by juveniles.

=== Blood Money ===
If one causes the death or injury of another person accidentally or intentionally, he or she must pay the victim's family blood money as a means of compensation. Blood money is only payable if the defendant is found guilty under the criminal procedure or legally responsible for the death of the victim. If the defendant is found defending themselves, family, or property, blood money is not paid. Blood money for the death of a male is AED 200,000 (US$54,450) and AED 100,000 (US$27,225) for females of all faiths and nationalities.

=== Punishable offenses ===
==== Verbal abuse and hate speech ====
Verbal abuse, including on social media is illegal and is punishable by a fine up to AED 250,000 or up to a year in prison, excluding any monetary compensation to the victim; some expats were penalized by deportation.

==== Alcohol consumption and driving under the influence ====
Since 2020, consumption and procession of alcohol has been decriminalised federally for all faiths and individual emirates were given the power to regulate alcohol sales in their emirates; Sharjah maintains its ban on the sale of alcohol, and Dubai still requires alcohol licenses for the purchase of alcohol outside bars and restaurants. Driving under the influence is strictly illegal and the allowable blood alcohol content while driving in the UAE is zero.

==== Abortion ====
Abortion in the United Arab Emirates is legal if the pregnancy is a result of rape, incest, at the approval of a regulatory committee, if the continuation of the pregnancy endangers the woman, or if the foetus is deformed and such deformities could negatively impact its quality of life.

==== Apostasy from Islam and blasphemy ====
Apostasy is technically punishable by death in the UAE, however there are no documented cases of the punishment being applied. Blasphemy is illegal and is defined as any act insulting God, religions, prophets, messengers, holy books, or houses of worship; foreigners convicted of blasphemy are deported.

==== Cross-dressing ====
Emirati law which criminalized cross-dressing, that is, wearing clothing deemed "inappropriate for one's sex", was changed in 2020 to more narrowly apply only to "men who enter a place designated for women while disguised as a woman". Foreign residents have been deported for this reason in past years, and individuals continue to be sanctioned for the practice.

==== Sexual activity ====
Homosexuality, extra-marital sex and adultery are illegal and are punishable with a minimum of 6 months in jail; since 2022, however, prosecution is only carried out on a complaint of the husband or male legal guardian of one of the two people involved.

==== Public display of affection ====
Public shows of affection are considered discourteous in Emirati culture and are discouraged. However, normal kissing or hugging is acceptable. Engaging in sexual intercourse in public areas is a crime punishable by law.

== Corporal punishment ==
Corporal punishment, including amputations and flogging, was officially removed as a legal form of punishment in 2020. Despite this, the United States Department of State has reported continuing imposition of sentences to flogging by sharia courts, as of 2021:

... Sharia (Islamic) courts, which adjudicate criminal and family law cases, still impose flogging as punishment for adultery, prostitution, consensual premarital sex, pregnancy outside marriage, defamation of character, and drug or alcohol charges.

Such penalties were in use in the country in the past; sentences to more severe forms of corporal punishments were regularly commuted.

== Capital punishment ==
Capital punishment is a legal penalty in the United Arab Emirates. Under Emirati law, multiple crimes carry the death penalty, and executions are required to be carried out by firing squad, the sole legal method. The law allows the death penalty for: premeditated murder and, in certain circumstances, for some other forms of culpable homicide; some forms of rape, including of a minor (penetrative child sexual abuse), or a disabled, or other vulnerable, person; and particular offences against internal and external state security in a time of war, or in other special circumstances. For example, joining the forces of an enemy country, or of a group that is hostile to the UAE is punishable by death. Several people who have been convicted of joining the Islamic State of Iraq and the Levant (ISIL) have been sentenced (in absentia) to death.

Sentences of capital punishment are infrequently carried out, usually being commuted, albeit to lengthy terms of imprisonment. Both UAE nationals and non-Emiratis have been executed for crimes. As of 2025, the last known executions is said to have occurred in February and March 2025.

== Personal status law ==
=== For Muslims ===
In the UAE, Sharia dictates most Muslim personal status law. Sharia courts have exclusive jurisdiction to hear family disputes, including matters involving divorce, inheritances, child custody, child abuse and guardianship for Muslims in the UAE. Accordingly, Muslim females require the permission of a male guardian to marry and Muslim women are not allowed to marry non-Muslims. Muslim men are allowed to practice polygamy and marry up to four women.

=== For non-Muslims ===
Non-Muslims are bound by the personal status laws of their home countries following changes to federal and local laws; this includes marriages, wills, inheritance, prenuptial agreements and alimony.

== Social security ==
The UAE has no social security laws that cover non-citizens, but the country provides social security to Emirati seniors, people with disabilities or those incapable of self support. The country also provides welfare benefits such as free medical care, education, and subsidised water and electricity to citizens. Victims of catastrophic illnesses and disasters are entitled to benefits.

== Free speech and free press ==
Section 2A of the United Arab Emirates constitution provides freedom of speech and press. However, the law prohibits criticism and slander of public officials that may create or encourage social uproar. Journalists undergo strict boundaries implemented from the government. A variety of information can be published and distributed without the content being harmful or insulting to others. All sources must be reliable and will not be published until a full investigation has been performed to phish out any fabricated information. Reporters are entitled to document and publish the details of public trials, except for the names of the accused, victims, or witnesses.

== 2020 legal reforms ==
In September 2020, article 1 of the Federal Penal Code was amended in 2020 to state that Sharia applies only to retribution and blood money punishments, and the decree defined that legal forms of punishment are retribution and blood money punishments, capital punishment, life imprisonment, temporary imprisonment incarceration, detention, and fines. Previously the article stated that "provisions of the Islamic Law shall apply to the crimes of doctrinal punishment, punitive punishment and blood money" making flogging, stoning, amputation, and crucifixion were technically legal punishments for criminal offences such as adultery, premarital sex, and drug or alcohol consumption.

Since November 2020, alcohol consumption for Muslims and non-Muslims is legal, but the law gives emirates the right to regulate alcohol sale and consumption; the emirate of Sharjah is still a dry emirate. Consensual extra-marital sex, including same-sex extra-marital sex law was changed to consider extra-marital sex a crime carrying a minimum sentence of 6 months imprisonment, but the law does not apply "except on the basis of a complaint from the husband or legal guardian", but the penalty may be suspended if the complaint is waived. The UAE also legalized co-habitation, and provided for a legal process for children born outside of wedlock. Parents still face a minimum of two years of jail term if neither decide to document the child.

== See also ==
- Marriage in the United Arab Emirates
- Human rights in the United Arab Emirates
