= Marriage in the United Arab Emirates =

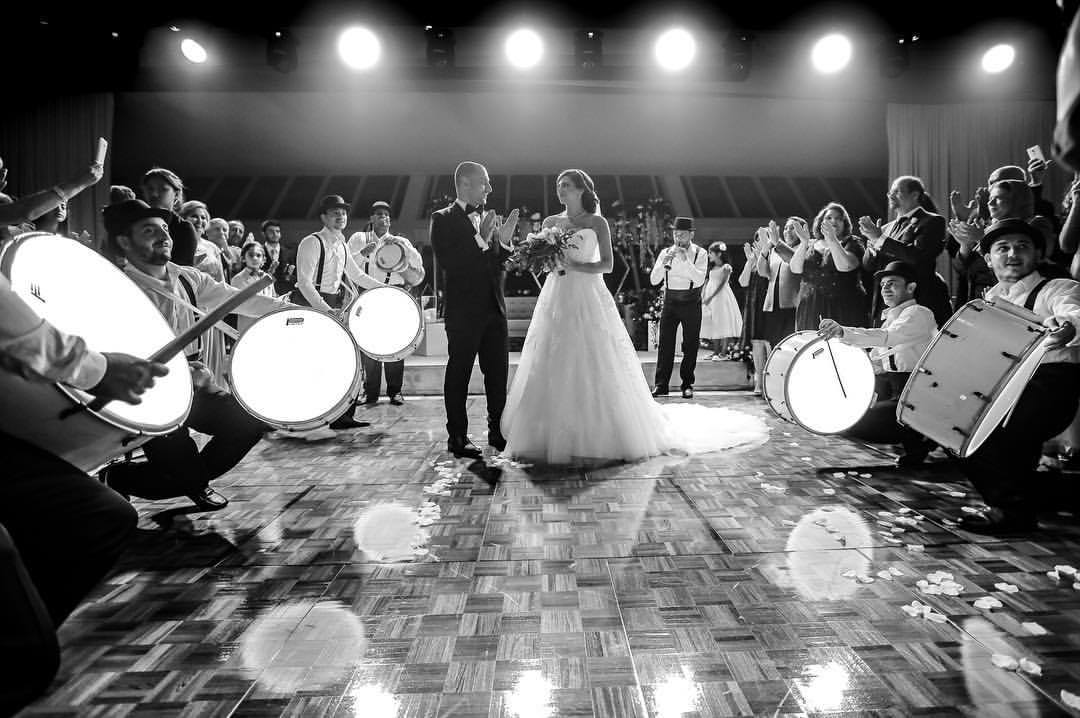
A wedding in Dubai

In the United Arab Emirates, marriage is governed by a combination of Islamic principles, local traditions, and legal regulations. Islamic marriages within the country are conducted according to Sharia law, where the groom and bride are both Muslims, or the bride is from 'Ahl Al-Kitaab', typically referring to Christianity or Judaism. Non-Muslim residents and visitors can marry through the UAE Personal Laws for non-Muslims or their respective religious or national laws, with civil marriage recognised nationwide since 2023.

Historically, early marriages and high consanguinity rates were common among Emiratis, though educational and social shifts have delayed the average age of marriage. Marriage in the United Arab Emirates (UAE) is seen as a social milestone, often celebrated through lavish weddings, prompting government measures such as the Marriage Fund and the 2024 Medeem Model to encourage simpler, culturally rooted ceremonies. In the 2020s, the government introduced reforms such as required genetic testing for marriages to reduce consanguinity rates, marriage leave, and expanded child custody rights, while divorce and polygamy remain legally permissible but socially debated. Same-sex marriages and relations are illegal under Sharia law.

== History ==
Historically, women across the Middle East typically married as teenagers or in their early 20s. Early marriage declined sharply in the 20th century—in the UAE, the percentage of women aged 15 to 19 who were married dropped from 57% in 1975 to 8% in 1995. In 2005, the average age of marriage for women with secondary or higher education was 27, while the average age for women with no education was 18. A study conducted at Zayed University between 2000 and 2001 found that, among a sample of 33 mothers of university students, the average age at marriage was 16.6 for the women and 25.3 for their husbands. The 33 daughters of the women were interviewed gave their ideal age of marriage as 20.2 years old. Procreation is expected within Emirati marriages, and pregnancy is typically embarked on soon after marriage. Marriage in the country is seen to "elevate" a girl's status to that of a woman.

In 1999, the BBC described Emirati weddings as "opulent" affairs, with as many as 1,000 guests typically in attendance. The same report found that as many as 80% of personal loans taken out by Emirati men were used for wedding expenses; as a result, many Emirati men opted to marry "less demanding" foreign women, known as "mixed marriages", which raised concerns of the potential dilution of Emiratis, an already minority population. Sheikh Zayed bin Sultan Al Nahyan, the founder of the country, launched a Marriage Fund on 10 December 1992 as a response, giving grooms who married an Emirati bride a £12,000 payout (equivalent to £22,987 in 2025) to help cover the wedding expenses. The fund also enacted a fine of AED 500,000 ($140,000, equivalent to $276,541 in 2025) for spending excessive amount of money on weddings, as decided by the government. As of 1999, 44,000 people received financial aid to arrange a marriage. The fund was amended in 2010 to remove sections against mixed marriages, which was seen as limiting personal freedom. In 2024, the "Medeem Model for Women's Weddings" programme was launched, designed to help couples organise less expensive weddings and arrange them based on Emirati traditions.

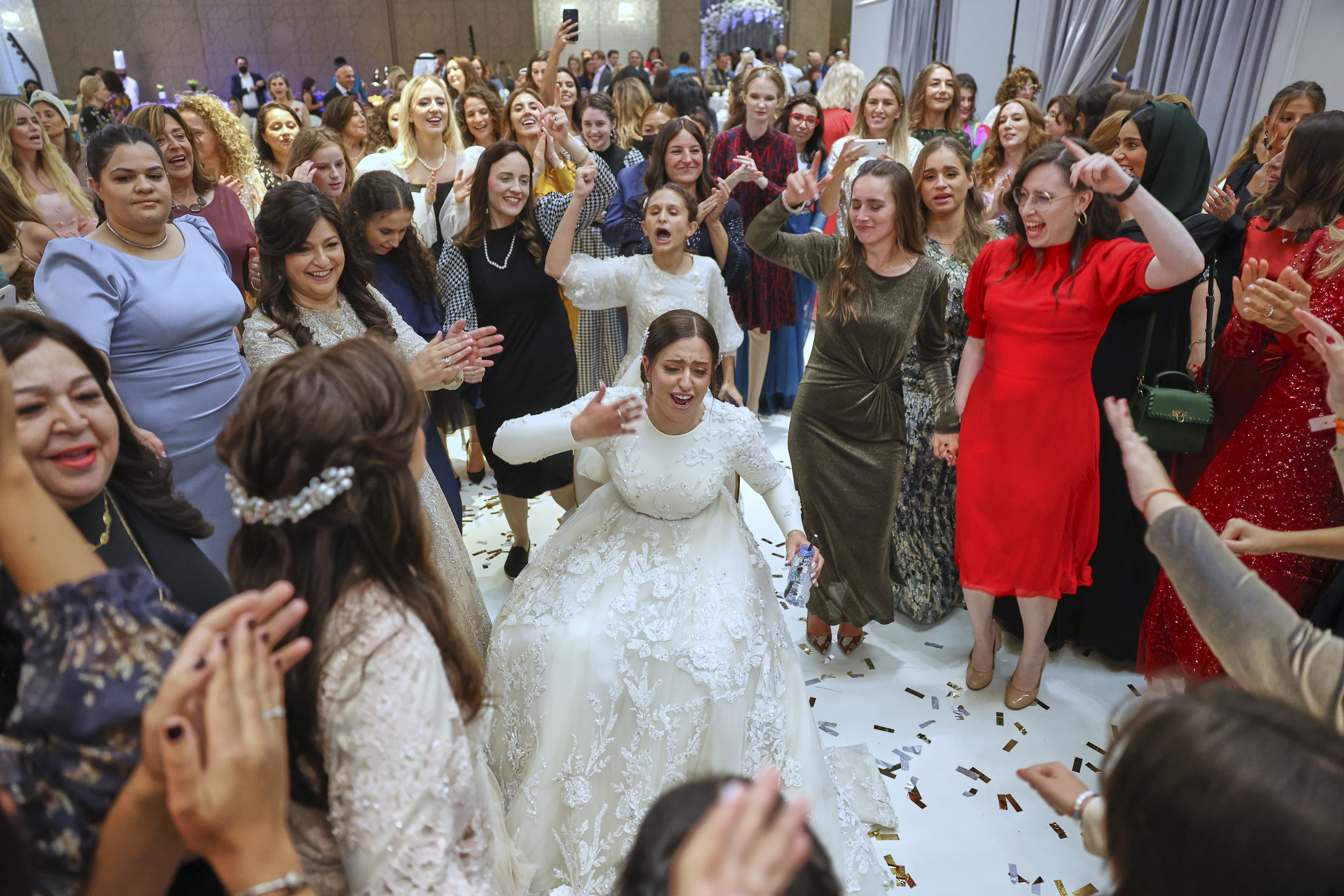
Lea Hadad (middle) at her wedding to Levi Duchman, the largest Jewish event in the nation's history

Sheikha Hind bint Maktoum Al Maktoum announced the addition of the 2025 law that allowed Emirati couples a 10-day marriage leave, adopted as a part of the initiative to double Emirati households in Dubai by 2033. Since January 2025, genetic testing is compulsory for all Emirati couples who are planning to wed, as part of the premarital screening programme. The requirement for genetic testing is attributed to the high prevalence of genetic disorders within the native population, linked to the 39% consanguineous marriage rate. Thalassemia is a high-incidence disease in the native Emirati population due to consanguineous marriages. A study for the International Journal of Mental Health and Addiction found that the key factor for women involved in consanguineous marriages was pressure from their families; furthermore, all participants in the study appeared to believe such marriages were inscribed in Emirati culture.

In 2022, the 1,500 guests, including high-ranking Emirati officials and foreign ambassadors from over 20 countries, attended the wedding of Rabbi Levi Duchman and Lea Hadad. The wedding was the largest Jewish event in the country's history.

== Law ==
The minimum age to marry in the United Arab Emirates is 18. Despite this, a 2015 report by the United Nations found that the percentage of married girls under 18 was steadily increasing. Under the UAE's Personal Status Law, a woman can marry if she consents; if her guardian is deemed to unjustly oppose the union, the court may transfer guardianship. The law also eliminated the need for a guardian's consent if the national law of a non-citizen Muslim woman does not require it for entering into a marriage contract. Women in "mixed-marriages", meaning a marriage to a non-Emirati, have legal capacity to pass on their nationality to their children since 2011, the first among Gulf countries.

=== Islamic marriage ===
Islamic marriages in the UAE are governed by Sharia law, where either both the groom and bride are Muslims, or the bride belongs to 'Ahl Al-Kitaab,' a term typically referring to followers of Christianity or Judaism. The marriage must be registered in a Sharia court in the country. A marriage application may be denied if either party has an inheritable blood disease or a transferable disease. The advance dowry in a marriage is not allowed to be more than AED 20,000 and the deferred dowry should not be more than AED 30,000.

Polygamy, the act of marrying multiple spouses, is legal for Muslim males. A man may have up to four wives at a time. A study by the Khaleej Times found that 70% of people in polygamous unions in Sharjah, Ajman, Umm Al Quwain and Fujairah were not Emirati. The study also found that an increasing number of women have become vocally opposed to the practice, believing it negatively affected stability in a family. The rates of polygamy in the country have been steadily declining, and was one of the leading causes of divorce initiated by women in 2013.

=== Non-Muslims ===
Non-Muslim residents and visitors in the United Arab Emirates can marry either through the UAE Personal Laws for non-Muslims, or their respective religious or national laws. The United Arab Emirates introduced a civil law in Abu Dhabi allowing for marriages, divorces, and obtaining joint child custody for non-Muslims in 2021, and was extended to include the entire country in 2023. This law amendment came as a result of the government attempts to modernize the law and make it more inclusive for non-muslims. Prior to the amendment, marriages were conducted under the laws of the spouses' respective native countries, and civil matters were governed by Sharia law. Residents of the United Arab Emirates have an option to follow the application process in their native country or perform a civil marriage in the United Arab Emirates. Within the first year of the law change, more than 5,000 marriages were registered by the Abu Dhabi Civil Family Court, with 12% of couples being tourists. The tourist percentage is attributed to residents of nearby countries that don't permit civil marriages; in one instance, a secular Israeli couple registered marriage in the UAE civil court citing this reason.

Article 5 of Federal Decree Law No. 41 of 2022 on Civil Personal Status provides five criteria for a civil marriage to occur: both spouses must be at least 21 years old, not closely related, and must provide their consent to the marriage. They are also required to sign a disclosure form and comply with any additional conditions specified in the subordinate legislations of the decree.

=== Same-sex marriage ===
Same-sex marriage is not legal nor recognized in the United Arab Emirates. As one of the sanctions, the UAE's Federal Penal Code allows for capital punishment as a legal penalty for homosexuality under Sharia law. On the other hand, Dubai's Penal Code allows for imprisonment of up to ten years, while Abu Dhabi's Penal Code allows imprisonment of up to 14 years. Same-sex sexual relations are illegal, and expressing support for LGBTQ+ rights is deemed as an offence.

== Divorce ==
Divorce in the UAE is regulated by Federal Law No. 28 of 2005, and for Muslims in particular, divorce is based on Sharia law. Either spouse may initiate and pursue divorce, with Federal Decree-Law No. (41) of 2022 giving equality in that regard to both men and women. Although divorce is legal and allowed under Sharia law, it experiences cultural pushback amongst Emiratis. Data collected for the International Journal of Women's Studies found that divorce is considered a social stigma in the UAE, especially for women. Despite this, divorce rates in the country have been considered high, with Juma'a al Majid Centre for Culture and Heritage estimating in 2009 that one in three Emirati marriages ended in a divorce. Divorce rates stayed consistently between 50 and 65% between 2005 and 2008.

=== Child custody ===
Custody terminates at the age of 18 for both males and females. Prior to the introduction of the Personal Status Law in 2025, it was 11 for boys and 13 for girls. Children have the right to choose their preferred parent for residence once they reach the age of 15. If the mother is non-Muslim while the child is Muslim, the residence is decided by the court's discretion, prioritising a child's interest. Before the revised Personal Status Law in 2025, the country terminated custody for non-Muslim mothers once the child turned 5. The Personal Status Law introduced penalties, including imprisonment and fines ranging from AED 5,000 to 100,000, for offences related to the custody of children, such as unauthorized travel with a child and the mismanagement or seizing of inheritance.

The Legal 500 analysts note that under the revised UAE Personal Status Law, psychological and medical conditions are among the factors considered in child custody rulings. In September 2021, the Dubai Court of Cassation overturned a lower-court decision that had granted a woman both a divorce and full custody of her two children aged five and seven. Medical reports submitted to the court confirmed that the woman was diagnosed with bipolar disorder, which the judges considered relevant to her parental capacity. A similar ruling was reported by another local outlet, where the Dubai court declined a woman’s request for divorce and custody based on verified medical findings.

== See also ==
- Arab wedding
- Human rights in the United Arab Emirates
