= Common Educational Proficiency Assessment =

Standardized tests used in the United Arab Emirates

Common Educational Proficiency Assessment (CEPA) is a set of locally-developed standardized tests used for admissions and placement by three federal institutions of higher education in the United Arab Emirates (Zayed University, the Higher Colleges of Technology, and UAEU). The tests are produced by the UAE Ministry of Higher Education and Scientific research as part of the National Admissions and Placement Office (NAPO) and administered in the three federal institutions. Around 17,000 grade 12 Emirati students take the tests each year. There are two CEPA exams. CEPA-English tests basic English proficiency, and CEPA-Math measures basic math skills. Both exams are administered in two formats: paper-based (with scanned answer sheets) and computer-based.

== Context ==
Zayed University, the Higher Colleges of Technology, and UAE University are primarily English-medium universities located in the United Arab Emirates. Each of these institutions has a foundations or academic bridge program designed to help students increase their level of English to the level required for higher education. CEPA scores indicate which, if any, level of English course is necessary.

== CEPA-English ==
CEPA-English was created in 2002 to place students into English foundations programs at the three federal institutions of higher education in the United Arab Emirates (Zayed University, the Higher Colleges of Technology, and UAE University), all of which are English-medium. It was designed to discriminate best at the average level of high school students in the UAE. The test takes two hours, in which test-takers complete 110 multiple choice questions and one essay. Test items are developed in conjunction with English teachers at the three institutions, in an effort to keep the content culturally relevant and compatible with local sensibilities.

=== Grammar and Vocabulary ===
CEPA-English tests English Grammar and Vocabulary proficiency using multiple-choice sentence-completion questions. There are 45 grammar questions, which cover a wide range of basic English structures. There are 40 vocabulary questions, testing the most common words of English, drawn from modified word lists, such as the General Service List, as well as academically-oriented words drawn from a modified Academic Word List.

=== Reading ===
The Reading Section of CEPA-English includes one visual, non-linear text (such as an advertisement) and two descriptive, narrative, or expository texts of about 400 words each. Vocabulary level is kept to approximately the first 2000 words. The questions on the Reading Section are all multiple-choice, and test students’ ability to identify the main idea of the text, find simple factual details, identify pronoun references, or make inferences about the text.

=== Writing ===
There is one task on the Writing Section of the exam. Typically, the test-taker is given a prompt eliciting an opinion about a general or local issue. The prompt is given in English and Arabic, and topics vary across versions. The recommended time for the Writing Section is about 30 minutes, in which the test-taker is expected to produce 150-200 words of original text.

=== Scoring ===
The multiple-choice section of CEPA-English is scored using IRT (Item Response Theory) three parameter modeling. Each test version is linked to previous versions, and new parameters are gathered during large administrations. The raw responses are scored using these parameters. A formula is then applied to convert the resulting numbers into CEPA scores, ranging from 90 to 210. The Writing Section is double-blind marked by local English teachers from the three federal institutions. The bands range from 0 (blank, no attempt) to 6. The scores are then mediated, employing multi-faceted Rasch measurement. Anomalous scores (e.g. from high rater disagreement) or jagged profiles are reviewed by the exam staff.

=== Score Descriptors ===
CEPA-English provides the following descriptors in its documentation.

CEPA MCQ Range	Average Writing	Descriptors	CEFR Range
90 - 139	0.62	Random	≤A1
140 - 149	1.48	Extremely low English ability (Beginner)	A1
150 - 159	2.38	Low, at-risk	A1-A2
160 - 169	3.11	Emerging proficiency	A2-B1
170 - 179	3.73	Intermediate	B1-B2
180 - 210	4.48	May be ready for direct entry to English-medium tertiary study	B2-C1+

== CEPA-Math ==
CEPA-Math tests basic math skills including algebra, geometry and measurement, basic data analysis and number sense (e.g. scientific notation, order of operations, fractions/decimals and estimation). There are 50 questions on CEPA-Math. Like CEPA-English, the test is developed in conjunction with faculty members at the three federal institutions of higher education, and scored using IRT modeling.

== Test Use ==
=== Admissions and cut scores ===
All cut scores and placement scores are determined by the three federal institutions of higher education themselves, with cooperation by CEPA staff. According to the website of Ministry of Higher Education and Scientific Research and the universities’ own websites, CEPA cut scores are as follows.

Institution	CEPA-English	CEPA-Math
Higher Colleges of Technology	Entry to Foundations: ≥150 Direct Entry to Program: ≥180 (Writing Band Direct Entry to Program: ≥5)	Direct Entry to Program: ≥170
UAE University	Entry to Foundations: ≥150 Direct Entry to Program: ≥185	Required (no minimum)
Zayed University	Entry to Foundations: ≥150 Direct Entry to Program: ≥185	Required (no minimum)

Around 78% of test-takers score above 150, and are eligible for entry into one of the federal institutions. Around 16% achieved a score high enough to bypass foundation programs in 2012, in sharp contrast to the 3% who achieved this score in 2003, when the exam was first used.

=== Other purposes ===
In 2007, CEPA was used as an exit exam for high schools in the UAE Ministry of Education system. CEPA has also been used to identify trends in UAE education and as an indicator of school progress. In 2012, vocational schools such as the Abu Dhabi Vocational Education and Training Institute (ADVETI) began to have their applications processed by NAPO, which will include the use of CEPA scores.

== Test Preparation Materials ==
The CEPA office has periodically produced materials designed for independent study and test preparation. Among these are CEPA-Learn, a multiple-choice mobile phone app that used SMS to provide students with practice questions, and CEPA Challenge, a study book which has been freely distributed to all grade 12 students since 2008.

== See also ==
Official website (in English)

Swann, Melanie (22 June 2012) "Hundreds of UAE students face college rejection" The National (Retrieved 22 June 2012)
