= Nahyan bin Mubarak Al Nahyan =

Emirati politician and businessman

- نهيان بن مبارك آل نهيان
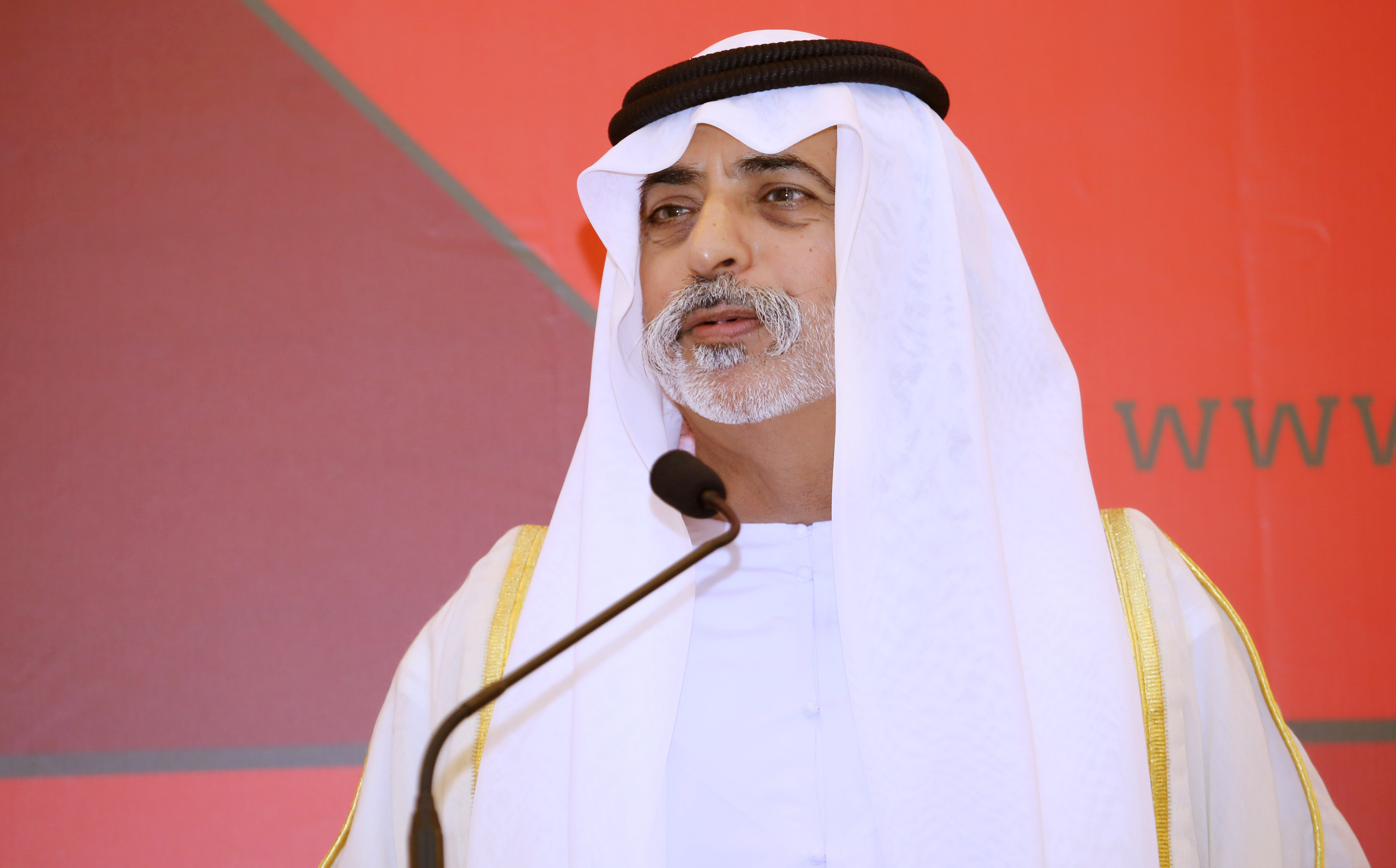

Minister of Tolerance
- Incumbent
- Assumed office 20 October 2017
- President: Khalifa bin Zayed Al Nahyan; Mohammed bin Zayed Al Nahyan
- Prime Minister: Mohammed bin Rashid Al Maktoum
- Preceded by: Lubna Khalid Al Qasimi

Minister of Culture and Knowledge Development
- In office 12 March 2013 – 20 October 2017
- President: Khalifa bin Zayed Al Nahyan
- Prime Minister: Mohammed bin Rashid Al Maktoum
- Preceded by: Abdul Rahman Mohammed Al Owais
- Succeeded by: Noura Al Kaabi

Minister of Higher Education
- In office 26 January 1992 – 12 March 2013
- President: Zayed bin Sultan Al Nahyan; Khalifa bin Zayed Al Nahyan
- Prime Minister: Maktoum bin Rashid Al Maktoum; Mohammed bin Rashid Al Maktoum
- Preceded by: Post established
- Succeeded by: Hamdan bin Mubarak Al Nahyan

Chancellor of United Arab Emirates University
- In office 1983–2013

Chancellor of Higher Colleges of Technology
- In office 1988–2013

Chancellor of Zayed University
- In office 1998–2013

Personal details
- Born: 1951 (age 74–75)
- Parent: Mubarak bin Mohammed Al Nahyan (father)
- Relatives: Hamdan bin Mubarak Al Nahyan (brother); Khalifa bin Zayed bin Khalifa Al Nahyan (great grandfather)

Sheikh Nahyan bin Mubarak Al Nahyan (Arabic: نهيان بن مبارك آل نهيان; born 1951) is an Emirati royal and politician, who currently serves as the minister of tolerance of the United Arab Emirates. Al Nahyan previously served as the minister of culture and the minister of higher education.

== Early life and education ==
He is the son of Mubarak bin Mohammed Al Nahyan, grandson of Mohammad bin Khalifa bin Zayed Al Nahyan, great-grandson of Khalifa bin Zayed bin Khalifa Al Nahyan, and great-great-grandson of Zayed bin Khalifa Al Nahyan. Hamdan bin Mubarak Al Nahyan, Minister of Public Works, is his brother.

Al Nahyan studied at British Midfield School.

== Career ==
Al Nahyan served as chancellor of two of the UAE's three government-sponsored institutions of higher learning: United Arab Emirates University, established in 1976, and the Higher Colleges of Technology, established in 1988. He was also president of Zayed University, established in 1998. He served in these positions until April 2013.

Prior to 12 March 2013, he headed the Ministry of Higher Education and Scientific Research. He is also the chairman of CERT (Centre of Excellence for Applied Research and Training), the commercial arm of the Higher Colleges of Technology, established in 1996. For several years, Sheikh Nahyan has been the sponsor of the Emirates Natural History Group with chapters in Abu Dhabi and Al Ain. One of the two awards presented annually by the Abu Dhabi chapter is the Sh. Mubarak Award, named for Sheikh Nahyan's father.

He is chairman of Sandooq al Watan, a social initiative. Since 2021, Sheikh Nahyan holds the honorary degree of Doctor of Social Sciences by the University of Balamand.

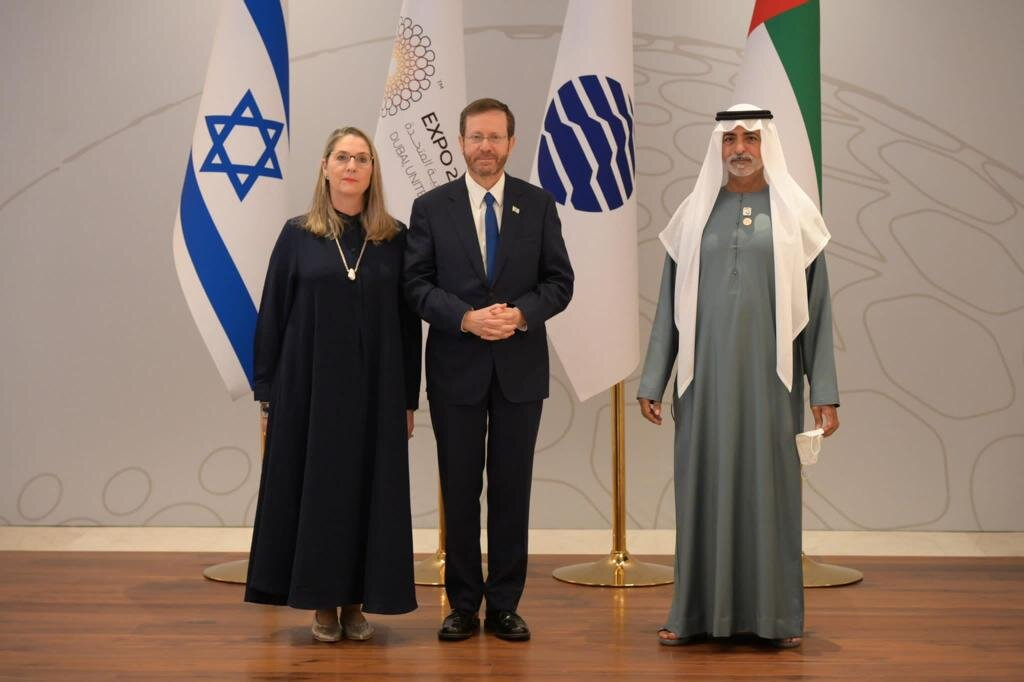
Nahyan with Israeli President Isaac Herzog in Abu Dhabi, 30 January 2022

== Investments ==
Nahyan was Chairman of Warid Telecom International (a regional telecoms group based out of Abu Dhabi with operations in Pakistan, Bangladesh, Uganda, Congo Brazzaville, and Ivory Coast). He is also chairman of the Abu Dhabi Group, Union National Bank, and United Bank Limited.

=== Pakistan ===
He owns an estate with a game reserve near the mouth of the Indus River in Sindh Province which he uses for falconeering and hunting. Nahyan's Abu Dhabi United Group is a large investor in Pakistan. It owns Bank Alfalah, Warid Telecom, Wateen Telecom, Taavun and many more in Pakistan. He is also Founder Chairman of Bank Alfalah.

Al Nahyan is a recipient of Pakistan's highest civilian award, the Hilal-e-Pakistan, conferred upon him by the President of Pakistan in 2005.

=== Georgia ===
In Georgia, Nahyan invested in Kor Standard Bank (now Terabank) and Biltmore Hotel Tbilisi.

== Controversy ==
In October 2020, a curator of Hay’s Literary Festival, Caitlin McNamara, accused Al Nahyan of sexually assaulting her in February of that year, 11 days before the launch of festival. According to McNamara, Al Nahyan invited her to an official dinner to discuss the Hay festival. However, according to McNamara Al Nahyan took her to a remote villa on a private island and sexually assaulted her. Al Nahyan denied the allegations.

In April 2021, a British woman (Ms. McNamara, 32) claimed that she was sexually assaulted by accused Nahyan bin Mubarak Al Nahyan. She claimed that she allegedly suffered at the hands of Sheikh Nahyan bin Mubarak Al Nahyan on 14 February 2020 at a private residence in Abu Dhabi. The Crown Prosecution Service said it could not bring charges because the alleged offence happened abroad.

== See also ==
- Ministry of Higher Education and Scientific Research
- Abu Dhabi Music & Arts Foundation
