= Abu Dhabi Police Force =

Primary law enforcement agency in the Emirate of Abu Dhabi

Abu Dhabi Police
- Official emblem of Abu Dhabi Police
- Common name: Abu Dhabi Police

Agency overview
- Formed: 1 June 1957; 69 years ago

Jurisdictional structure
- Operations jurisdiction: Emirate of Abu Dhabi, United Arab Emirates, United Arab Emirates
- Map of Abu Dhabi Police's jurisdiction
- Area: 67,340 km^{2} (26,000 sq mi)
- Population: 2,784,490
- Governing body: Government of Abu Dhabi
- General nature: Local civilian police

Operational structure
- Headquarters: 617 Shakhbout Bin Sultan Street, Abu Dhabi
- Agency executives: Major General Ahmed Saif bin Zaitoon Al Muhairi, Commander; Major General Sheikh Mohammed bin Tahnoon Al Nahyan, Director General

Website
- www.adpolice.gov.ae

Abu Dhabi Police is the primary law enforcement agency in the Emirate of Abu Dhabi, one of the United Arab Emirates.

== Overview ==
Under the command of Saif bin Zayed Al Nahyan, Deputy Prime Minister and Minister of Interior, the Abu Dhabi Police is primarily responsible for enforcing criminal law, enhancing public safety, maintaining order and keeping the peace throughout the Emirate.

== Fleet ==
The Abu Dhabi police force is noted for its fleet of exotic police cars, similarly to that of the nearby Dubai Police Force.

Among their fleet of vehicles are:

- Chevrolet Camaro
- W Motors Lykan HyperSport (one of 7 Lykans)
- Nissan GT-R
- A race car "F999", to commemorate the Abu Dhabi Grand Prix
- A motorcycle "Falcon", unveiled alongside the F999

== Commanders ==
- Major General Ahmed Saif bin Zaitoon Al Muhairi (Current Commander-in-Chief)
- Major Gen. Faris Khalaf Al Mazrouei (2019 till 2025)
- Major Gen. Mohammed Khalfan Al Rumaithi (2016–2019)
- Lt. General Sheikh Saif bin Zayed Al Nahyan (1995 – 2016)
- Brig. Thani Obeid Khamees Al Rumaithi (1991–1995)
- Major Gen. Hamad Saeed Ahmed Al Hassani (1975–1991)
- Colonel Mohammed Juma'a Mohammed Al Dhaheri (1974–1975)
- Major Gen. Mubarak bin Mohammed Al Nahyan (1961–1974)
- Sheikh Sultan bin Shakbut Al Nahyan (1957–1961)

== History ==
Abu Dhabi Police has taken different designations over its history and been identified by the following six names:

- General Headquarters of Abu Dhabi Police (2004–present)
- General Directorate of Abu Dhabi Police (1984–2004)
- General Directorate of Police (1977–1984)
- Local Ministry of Interior (Abu Dhabi Police) (1971–1977)
- Command of Police and Public Security (1967–1971)
- Department of Police and Public Security (1957–1966)

Since the formation of the Abu Dhabi Police in 1957, the evolution of the police has occurred in four primary stages, as follows:

Foundation stage
1957–1966

- Abu Dhabi Police was formed in 1957 by the then ruler of Abu Dhabi, Sheikh Shakbut bin Al Nahyan.
- There were 80 police officers with tasks that included guarding royal locations, markets and banks. They were also required to monitor boats in the surrounding waters, as well as bring people before the ruler that wanted to voice concerns and have disputes addressed.
- By 1959 the number of police officers had grown to more than 150 and the Police Department was located north of Al-Hosn Palace in the centre of Abu Dhabi City.

Building stage
1966–1979

- The Building Stage of Abu Dhabi Police occurred following the accession of the late Zayed bin Sultan Al Nahyan (1918–2004). As the ruler of Abu Dhabi and the first President of the United Arab Emirates, a post he held for over 30 years (1971–2004), Sheikh Zayed gave considerable attention to the development of the Abu Dhabi Police.
- On 1 November 1971, Zayed bin Sultan Al Nahyan issued an order to recognize the government apparatus through the establishment of various Ministries and the Council of Ministers in the emirate of Abu Dhabi. Among these Ministries was the Minister of Interior (under regulation of Ministry of Interior No.8 of 1971). The Abu Dhabi Police turned into the local Ministry of Interior and thus attained the responsibilities of the local Ministry of Interior.
- Under the regulation of Ministry of Interior No.8 of 1971, the Abu Dhabi Police was responsible for establishing security and stability in the Emirate and maintaining the "souls, honour and property" of the people. It was also directly in charge of: Naturalisation and passport matters, prison affairs, traffic affairs, guarding of oil installations, liaison with Arab and International Police Directorates, fighting smuggling and illegal entry of people, drugs, and all forbidden substances as well as the prevention of crime.

Progressive stage
1979–1995

- This stage was marked by the evolution of the Abu Dhabi Police toward the eventual affiliation and merging into the Federal Ministry of Interior.
- In December 1979, Mubarak bin Mohamed Al Nahyan, Minister of Interior, issued a resolution on the executive procedures for the merger of the General Headquarters of Abu Dhabi Police into the Ministry of Interior. The resolution stipulated that the General Headquarters of Abu Dhabi Police would be part of the federal police and security forces affiliated with the Ministry of Interior and would be treated as a General Directorate.

Modernization, qualitative and strategic development stage
1995–present

- Saif bin Zayed Al Nahyan assumed the role of General Commander of Abu Dhabi Police in 1995. Embodied in the five-year plan of the strategic development of the Abu Dhabi Police (2004–2008) and the succeeding Strategic Plan (2008–2012), this stage has been marked by the modernization of the police force in the pursuit of optimum effectiveness and efficiency. In-particular this stage has witnessed restructuring and growth of the organization, development of concise strategic targets, a focus on employee development as well as significant future technology acquisitions, all with the intention to provide safety, security and an optimum quality of life for the community.

== Ranks ==
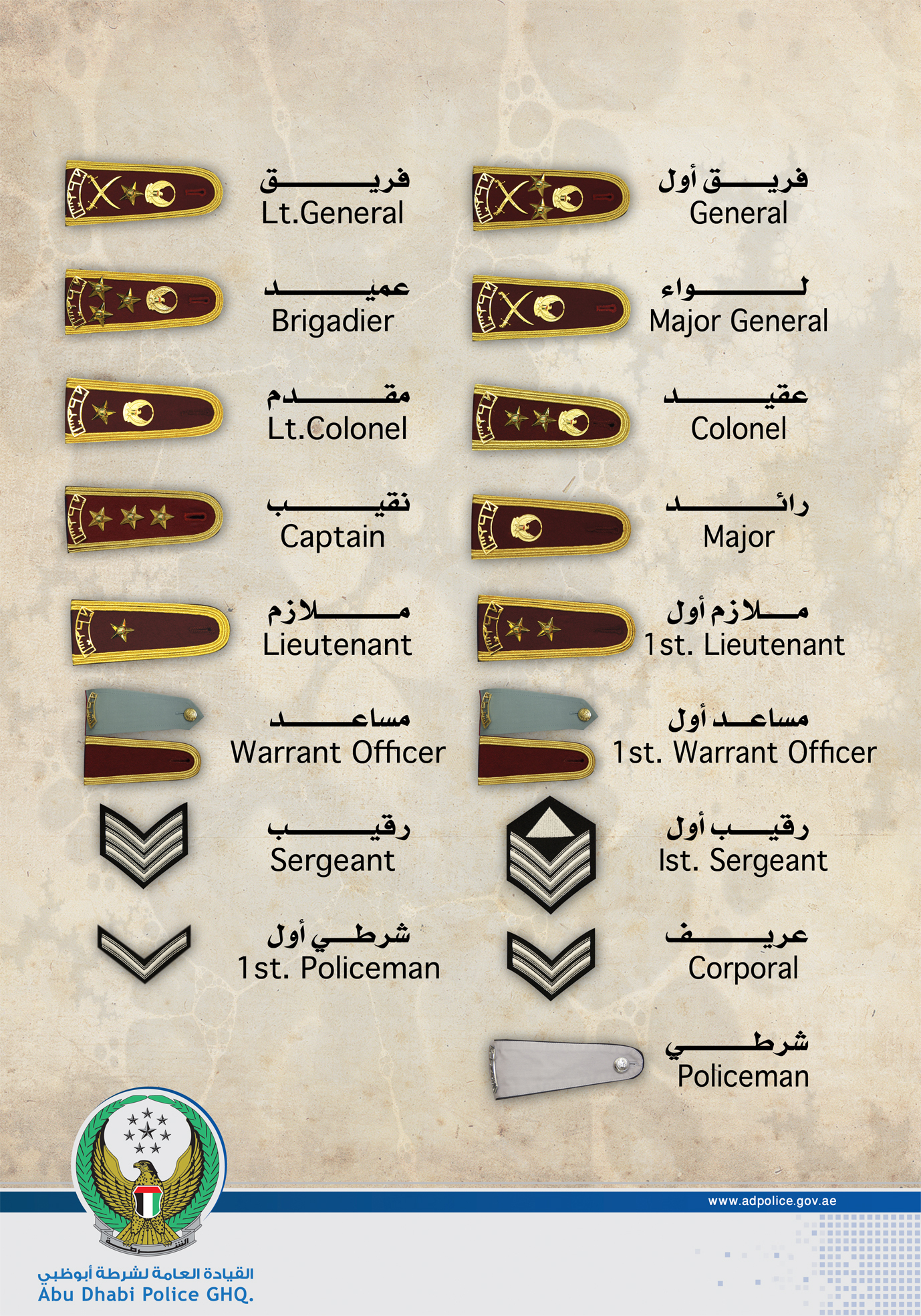
Abu Dhabi Police Ranks – click to enlarge

After many decades using green colours, the uniforms were changed to gray in 2017. In addition, the emblem and the vehicles liveries have been modified. They were also changed a few times before this.

== Structure ==
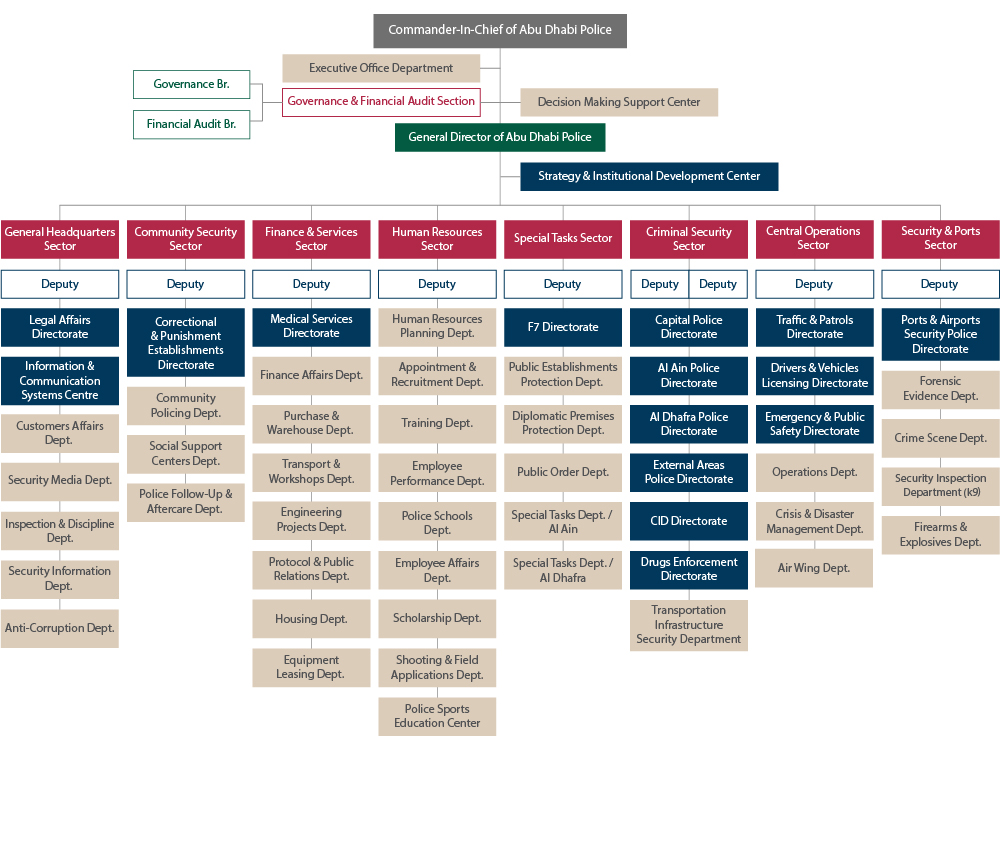
Structure of Abu Dhabi Police- Click to enlarge.

- Under the Commander General of Abu Dhabi Police there are five departments that report directly.
- Six General Directorates with their relevant Departments comprise the rest of the ADP, with three other bodies falling under the Deputy Commander General.
- Abu Dhabi Police employs 12,500 frontline staff.
- There is a total staff of 36,000 including civil defence, ambulance and fire services and border security.

== Departments ==
=== Search and Rescue ===
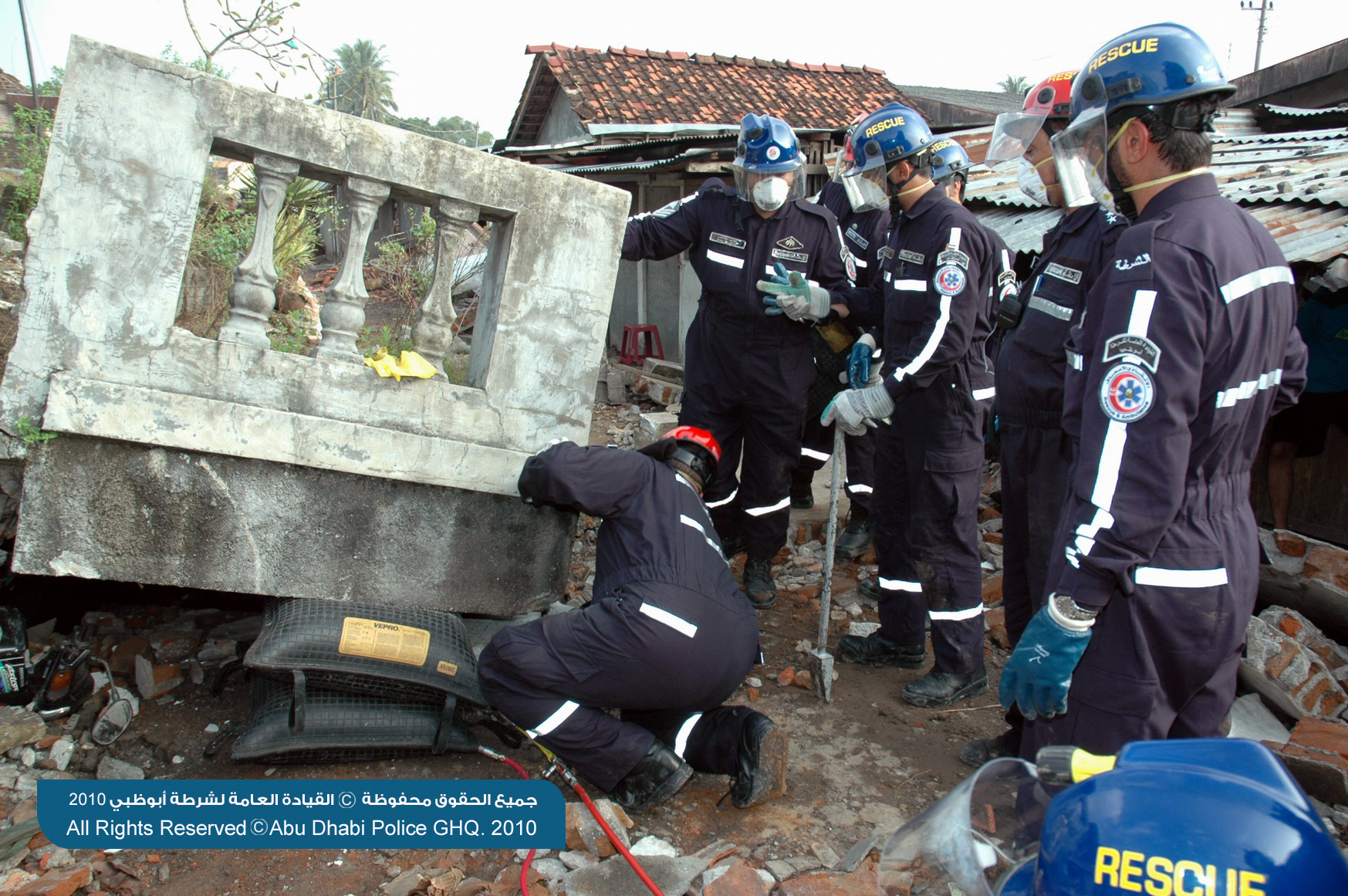
UAE Search and Rescue Team.

The UAE Urban Search and Rescue Team (UAE USAR) is part of the International Search and Rescue Advisory Group, made up of more than 80 countries and organizations. The UAE joined the elite corps of 16 on 19 December 2009. The team was launched when emergency and public safety department workers were deployed after Pakistan's 2005 earthquake. In 2006 and 2007 they operated in Indonesia. In 2008 in Afghanistan and in 2009 Indonesia again. The UN advisory group was established in 1991 by teams responding to the 1988 Armenian earthquake. Given the high cost of search and rescue missions and the need to dispatch quickly, it was decided to build a group of teams that could be called upon around the world to be deployed in an emergency. The classification is based on globally accepted standards for international search and rescue operations and members have to be able to deploy their teams free of charge. On 25 August 2010, the team traveled to Pakistan to assist with the flood relief effort.

=== Forensic Services ===
In 1980 the first laboratory opened in Abu Dhabi. Has international accreditation IS017025 for 50% of services, including: Toxicology, Alcohol, Biology, DNA, Fingerprint, Doping, Documents (Counterfeiting).

There are 180 staff in Forensic Services plus 100 support staff.

=== Department of Government and Diplomatic Premises Protection ===
Responsible for the protection of government and diplomatic premises. Preparing policies and regulations regarding the establishment of, granting of licences to, monitoring and assessing the performance of the private security companies.

=== Department of Special Tasks ===
Responsible for planning for riot prevention and VIP protection.

=== Department of F7 ===
Provides teams at serious incidents including sniper units, explosives experts, divers etc. This highly trained Team deals with tasks, not much is known about them however some believe they are seen in action in the Murder of Ibolya Ryan video which took place in Abu Dhabi.

=== Criminal Investigations Department (CID) ===
Responsible for strategies, policies and procedures for crime reduction and control. Carrying out criminal investigations.

=== Directorate of Traffic and Patrols ===
Responsible for monitoring traffic and traffic violations. Includes marked and unmarked patrol cars.

Traffic Patrols now use the Mobile Data Transfer System, also known as AREST (Accident Referencing and Analysing System). This allows information from an accident, traffic violation or major congestion to be sent to all key authorities within seconds. After an accident the vehicle details, description of the incident, vehicle history and photographs are uploaded and connected to the Abu Dhabi Municipality and Abu Dhabi Police GHQ. It is designed not only to allow for a faster processing of accident reports or fines it also allows for detailed data to be compiled over, for example, accident trouble spots or areas of traffic build up. This can be used by the authorities to investigate trouble spots and devise solutions. Abu Dhabi Police have streamlined traffic fine management by integrating Emirates ID and vehicle registration details. This allows for convenient online or in-person access to traffic violation records and settlements without additional documentation.

=== Department of Vehicles and Licensing ===
Issues vehicle and driving licences.

=== Department of Community Police ===
Established in 2003 as a method to enhance the proactive role of the police and community in crime prevention. The community police are also active in social programs and local events as a means to strengthen relations with the public.

=== Department of Social Support Centres ===
Responsible for issue of domestic and household violence. Providing care and psychological support to the victims of violence and crimes against children, women and the elderly.

=== Operations Department ===
Responsible for planning and managing any security crisis or disaster, crisis management and emergency situations.

=== Air Wing Section ===
Manages and provides aerial search and rescue operations. Monitoring and tracking of other criminal activities.

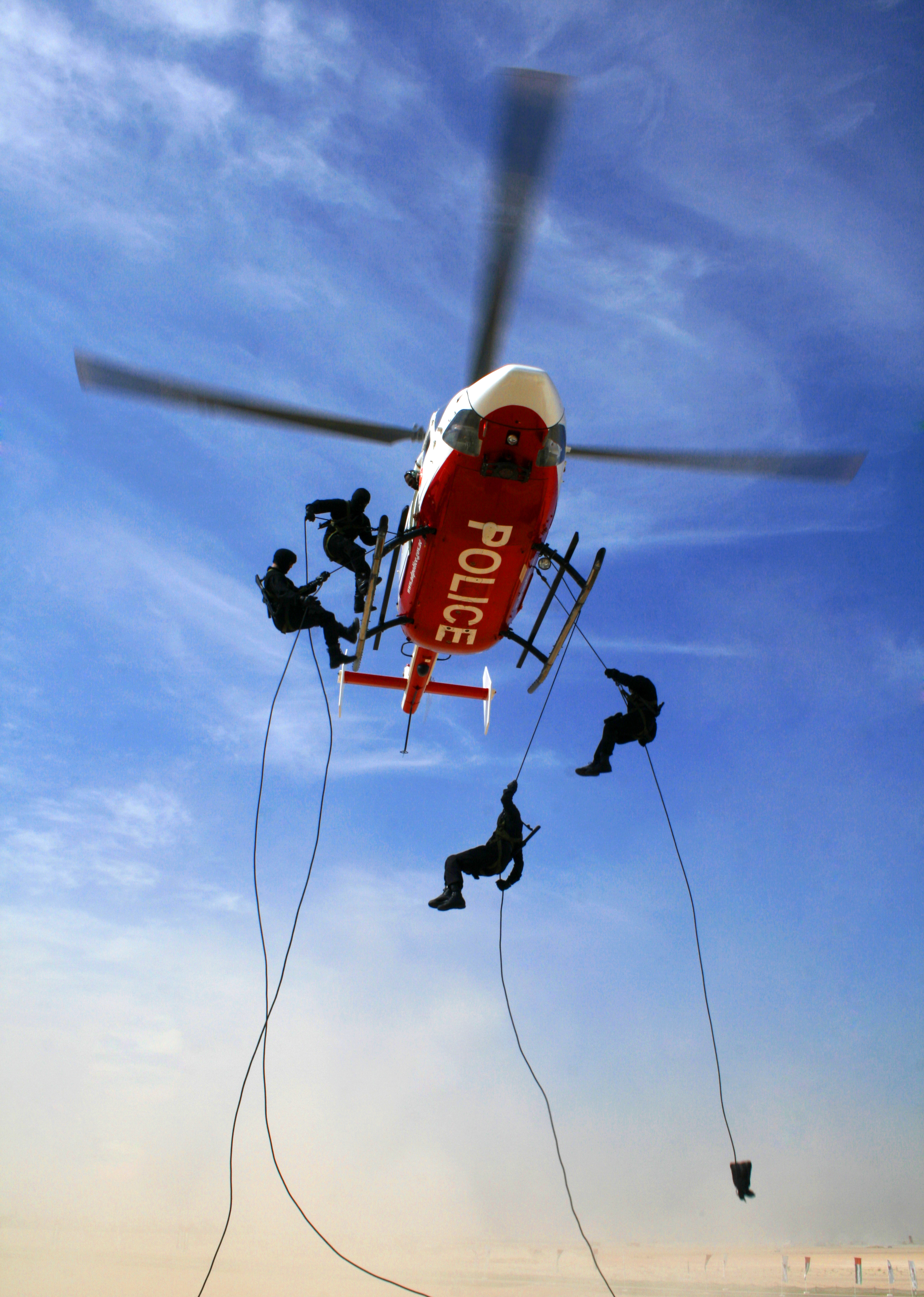
Abu Dhabi Police Air Wing Helicopter.

=== Security Inspection Department ===
Police Dogs Section (K9). Carries out search, criminal investigation, anti-narcotics, identification parades, tracing and detection of weapons and explosives, private security business development (PSBD).

=== Department of Weapons and Explosives ===
Issues weapons and explosive licences and deals with all activities related to the licensing, usage, transportation, storage, detection and diffusion of explosives.

=== Facial Recognition System ===
The programme was established in 2007 after evaluation of 1560 samples from 30 individuals. It measures 300 reference points across the face. The UAE is the first country to match the system with criminal lists at border control points.

=== Iris Technology ===
The main study into the effectiveness of this technology is known as the UAE Study. In partnership with the University of Cambridge (UK) a pair comparison of 200 billion was conducted among a sample of 632,500 irises. No false matches were detected. The system is in place at all UAE entry and exit ports and works inconjunction with the immigration authorities.

=== Happiness patrol ===
Abu Dhabi police is the only police agency to have a happiness patrol.

=== Virtual Global Taskforce ===
In March 2010, the Ministry of Interior became a member of the Virtual Global Taskforce. A Higher Committee was formed (Ministerial Decision 240 of 2010) for the Protection of Children. The chair of this committee is Major General Nasser Salem L. Al Nuaimi. The Chair represents the UAE on the board of the VGT. The Higher Committee for Child Protection was issued with the following responsibilities:

- The establishment of a Child Protection Centre
- Monitoring child exploitation on the internet
- Controlling abuse through public networks
- Raising Awareness
- Developing and strengthening the role of the family

== Police College ==
The college was established by the late Sheikh Zayed bin Sultan Al Nahyan. Federal Law No.(1) was issued in 1985 and stipulated the foundation of the college. The aim was stated as to create an effective police force, enhance the security of the country, safeguard its achievements and gain the confidence of society.

The law initially stipulated that the duration of study and training in the college would be two years, after which the student would receive a Diploma in Policing Sciences.

The duration of study was changed to four years in 1992 following the issue of Federal Law No. (5). The study programme includes practical and field training. After successful completion of the programme the student shall be awarded a bachelor's degree in law and policing sciences.

An Institute for officers training affiliated to the Police College was established by the same Law of 1992. In 2002 the system of study in the college was changed to incorporate training theory programmes and field work.

According to this new system the four years duration of study are divided into two levels of study consisting of eight terms:

- Basic level: two years (one year for theoretical study and another for field work).
- Advanced level: (two years).

These two levels are preceded by an introductory period for the physical and psychological preparation of the students. After successful completion of the study and training programmes the student will be awarded a Bachelor's degree in Police Sciences and Criminal Justice.

== Events ==
=== Golden Jubilee, 2007 ===
Abu Dhabi Police celebrated its golden jubilee on 5 December 2007. A mass wedding ceremony of 50 nationals, symposiums and lectures, exhibitions of the work of Abu Dhabi Police, a book documenting the history of the police force and collection of half a million signatures on a huge canvas were all part of the celebrations. The occasion was used to showcase the police force, its security capabilities, technological applications and its training. Many social activities, community programmes, sports activities were part of the golden jubilee celebrations. Organised under the directives of Saif bin Zayed Al Nahyan celebrations were held under the slogan 'Fifty years of building leadership and distinction'.

=== F999 ===
As part of the first ever Formula One Grand Prix to be in Abu Dhabi, the Abu Dhabi Police unveiled the world's fastest police car – the F999.

On Abu Dhabi Corniche on 31 October, thousands turned out to witness a drive past of police vehicles past and present, a performance by the Abu Dhabi Police Band before the F999 was unveiled.

=== Falcon Bike ===
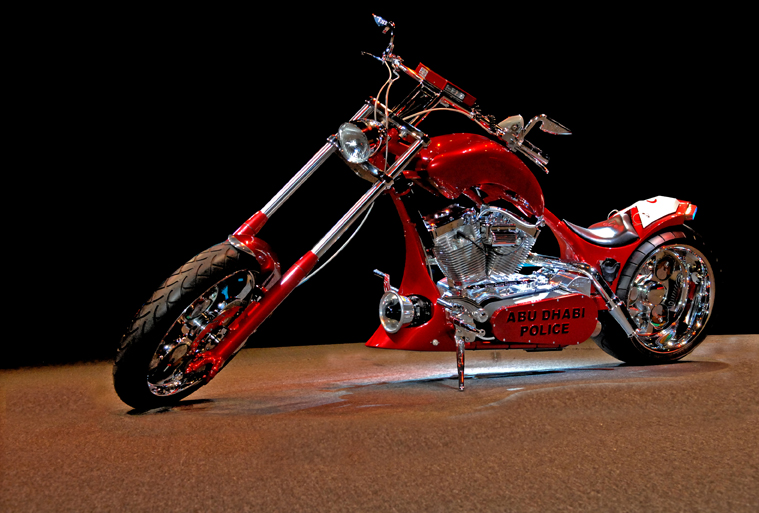
Abu Dhabi Police Falcon Bike.

The bike was unveiled at the Abu Dhabi Exhibition Centre on 29 May 2009. Built by the custom bike specialists Orange County Choppers – featured on the Discovery Channel show American Chopper – the bike is used for community projects and awareness raising across the UAE. Paul Teutul Snr, star of American Chopper and founder of OCC, took part in a live action and film performance which culminated in the Falcon Bike taking to the stage.

== Publications ==
=== 999 Magazine ===
999 is a monthly magazine issued by the Ministry of Interior in the UAE since 1971. The magazine, known previously as 'Al Shurta', was relaunched under the new title of 999 in October 2008. 999 Magazine features news and interviews with staff members of the Ministry of Interior. The magazine is distributed in the UAE, Oman, Bahrain, Kuwait, Qatar and Saudi Arabia.

=== Abu Dhabi SIXTY Years of Progress, 1957–2017 ===
In 2017, to mark the 60th anniversary of Abu Dhabi Police, 215 page book was published chronicling the force from its inception to the present day.

== Controversy ==
The Abu Dhabi Police allegedly assisted Sheikh Issa bin Zayed Al Nahyan in a 2009 torture incident. The Police are also alleged to have used excessive force on critics and protesters.
