= Murder of Ibolya Ryan =

2014 murder in Abu Dhabi, United Arab Emirates

- Location: Abu Dhabi, United Arab Emirates
- Date: 1 December 2014
- Weapon: Knife
- Deaths: 1
- Injuries: 0
- Perpetrator: Ala'a Badr Abdullah al-Hashemi

Ibolya Ryan (née Balázsi) was a Hungarian-American kindergarten teacher originally from Romania murdered in Abu Dhabi, United Arab Emirates, on 1 December 2014.

== Overview ==
The murder was committed by a woman wearing black gloves and a veiled niqab, who proved to be unknown to the victim. After committing the murder, the perpetrator planted a bomb at the home of an Arab–American physician. These attacks, taking place in the wake of a spate of attacks on Westerners in Saudi Arabia, attracted international coverage and raised concerns in the international security and business communities.

The stabbing, which took place in Boutik Mall, an Abu Dhabi shopping mall located on Al Reem Island, and was caught on tape in a routine surveillance video, unsettled citizens and the foreign population of Abu Dhabi because acts of terrorism are an extremely rare event in the United Arab Emirates.

The Emirates have classified the murder as a lone wolf terrorist attack inspired by terrorist ideology acquired online.

== Incident ==
=== Murder ===
At the beginning of the investigation, authorities left open the possibility the murderer could have been a man in disguise. Two days after the murder, on 3 December, Abu Dhabi Police released a statement that, "Investigations are still under way to identify the suspect's identity and gender. Witnesses reported that the culprit was fully covered wearing an abaya, black gloves and face cover." Abu Dhabi Security Media Department at the Ministry of Interior posted a video on its official YouTube channel, showing CCTV footage of the suspect, dubbed the "Reem Island Ghost", who stabbed the American kindergarten teacher Ibolya on Monday afternoon on Al Reem Island in Abu Dhabi.

On the CCTV footage, people on the scene can be seen reacting to the killing. One mother with a young child can be seen hurrying him away while security guards move towards the corridor. People appear to be alerted to something happening in the toilets and while a security guard moves along the corridor into them, the suspect moves towards the elevators. The video then shows the assailant fleeing the scene following the crime that took place inside the washroom of a shopping mall, wearing a black abaya, black gloves and the face-covering veil known as niqab.

Police said the victim was stabbed to death with a "sharp tool" following an argument in a women's restroom. On the surveillance footage, the robed suspect is seen stepping off an elevator, briefly interacting with a security guard, then taking a newspaper before walking toward the restroom. Some 90 minutes later, the suspected attacker runs back into the lobby as shoppers scatter, shakes off a woman who tries to stop her, boards an elevator to a parking garage and flees. The tape ends with footage of a bloody trail of footprints leading from one of the restroom stalls.

On the morning of Thursday 4 December, news sources said that Abu Dhabi Police would be able to catch the killer. Later that day, General Sheikh Saif bin Zayed Al Nahyan, Deputy Prime Minister and Minister of Interior in UAE, said that the security and police forces had arrested the suspected "Niqabi" woman for the brutal murder of the American teacher. He emphasized that the suspect had been identified in less than 24 hours, and arrested after less than 48 hours. He explained that after committing her first crime, the "Niqabi" suspect went to another building located at the Abu Dhabi Corniche, where she planted a primitive bomb on the doorstep of an Egyptian-American doctor's house; police were able to dismantle the bomb before it detonated.

Sheikh Saif described the crime as "a slap to every noble human value that the UAE cherishes—all of which are derived from the teachings of Islam and the genuine Arab heritage." He stressed that the UAE vigorously defended such civilized values both on its own soil and abroad, and expressed his deep sorrow at witnessing such crimes in a country characterized by security and safety.

=== Murderer ===
There was a conflict in information about the real identity of the murderer. While international news coverage mentioned that the murderer was 38-year-old Yemeni-born UAE citizen Alaa al-Hashemi, UAE based newspapers reported on 4 December that the murderer was not called Dalal al Hashemi. A few months later, UAE based news coverages started to refer to the murderer as Alaa Bader Abdullah, also called Ala'a Badr Abdullah al-Hashemi.

Al-Hashemi was convicted of the murder, sending money to al-Qaeda in Yemen, and publishing information aimed at harming the reputation of the Emirates, a seven-state federation that includes the commercial hub of Dubai. She was reported to have been executed in 2015.

=== Attempted bombing ===
Security videos show, and police reports confirm, that Ryan's murderer returned to her car and drove to the home of an Egyptian-American expat physician where she planted a bomb, which was discovered by the physician's 13-year-old son on his way to evening prayers at mosque. According to WAM, the materials used in the homemade bomb were "primitive".

The Security Media Department posted a dramatic YouTube video explaining the details of the crime, with images taken from CCTV. The video highlighted the search and inspection procedures conducted by the police and security forces, which eventually led to the arrest of the suspect. There are shots showing the white SUV that the suspect was seen driving from the scene of the crime. Blood can be seen on the steering wheel, and a black suitcase—identical to the one she allegedly carried to the doctor's apartment— is shown in the police video.

In a video from 4 December, the suspect is seen heading towards the doctor's home with a small black suitcase. A security guard said he saw her enter and then leave quickly. The bomb was spotted when the doctor's son was going to mosque in the evening to pray and noticed the strange object in front of the house. Colonel Rashid Bourshid, head of the criminal investigation department, said: "The doctor who was targeted with the bomb, 46-year-old MH, informed the security guard about the strange package in front of his door. The guard in turn informed the police who rushed to the spot and evacuated the site. They dismantled the bomb and identified its primitive components that included small gas cylinders, a lighter, glue, and nails to cause maximum injuries when detonated."

== Victim ==
Ryan was a naturalized US citizen and Hungarian citizen. She was the mother at the time of 11-year-old twin sons, who lived with her in Abu Dhabi, and a 13-year-old daughter who lived with Ryan's ex-husband in Vienna, Austria. Ryan, born and raised in Romania (Transylvania) before defecting as a young adult to Hungary, self-described as Hungarian-American. She had taught in four countries including the United States over the preceding 15 years. She and her husband had moved to Sopron, Hungary with their 3 children about 8 years prior, and subsequently divorced. With the assistance of the UAE government, her body was transported to and buried at her family's plot in Simian, Romania.

== Classification as terrorism ==
The move to classify the incident as an act of terrorism was not taken lightly in Abu Dhabi, where the economy depends on the labor of hundreds of thousands of ex-pats and on tourism. According to an unnamed security official in the U.A.E. and reported by the official WAM (Emirates News Agency), shortly before the attack the killer had logged on to terrorist websites and "acquired the terrorism ideology and learned how to manufacture explosives." According to WAM, the "crimes she had committed are the result of a personal instigation and a lone terrorist act."

== Context ==
The economy of the UAE depends on the tight security for which its member states are noted.

The murder followed a September 2014 statement by Abu Muhammad al-Adnani, spokesman for the self-described Islamic State of Iraq and the Levant urging Muslims to murder Westerners and people from any country participating in attacks on the Islamic State: "kill him in any manner or way however it may be." The Emirate has taken an important and well-publicized role in that war. The attack can be viewed as part of a "trend of terrorist acts through inspiration rather than a direct order from militant groups", including the 2014 Saint-Jean-sur-Richelieu ramming attack, the beheading of French tourist Herve Gourdel in Algeria, and killings of Danish and American nationals in Saudi Arabia.

== Response ==
The UK Foreign and Commonwealth Office (FCO) issued new security warnings on 5 December, advising that indiscriminate attacks could be made on foreigners in the Gulf States and elsewhere, "Attacks could be directed against British interests. There is considered to be a heightened threat of terrorist attack globally against UK interests and British nationals, from groups or individuals motivated by the conflict in Iraq and Syria."

The US State Department's Overseas Security Advisory Council (OSAC) issued a new security advisory, urging Americans in the Gulf to vary their routines and schedules. American Security officials had previously warned expatriates working in the Middle East of a jihadist web posting urging attacks on teachers in American schools.

A fundraising effort was launched by the recruitment firm involved with bringing Ryan to Abu Dhabi in order to bring Ryan's body home and provide for her children's education. The Ryan family took control of the fund weeks later and repurposed it to assist Ryan's family in Romania.

The expat community in Abu Dhabi was shaken by the murder; security in Abu Dhabi is tight and the country is usually considered safe for foreign workers.

== Trial ==
In late June 2015, the Federal Supreme Court in Abu Dhabi sentenced to death the accused Emirati woman, Alaa Bader al-Hashemi, for the crimes. The ruling could not be appealed. Al-Hashemi had reportedly requested psychological help due to chronic mental illness and "unreal visions". However, psychiatric tests ordered by the court showed she had been aware of her actions and that her mental condition was not found to have affected her actions.

== Execution ==
Ahmed Al Dhanhani, Attorney General for the State Security Prosecution, announced that on Monday morning, 13 July 2015, the ruling of The State Security Circuit of the Federal Supreme Court No. 73 of 2015 on the execution of Alaa Bader Abdullah (a.k.a. Alaa Bader al-Hashemi) had been carried out, following the approval of President at the time Khalifa bin Zayed Al Nahyan.
