= Capital punishment in the United Arab Emirates =

Capital punishment is a legal penalty in the United Arab Emirates. Emirati law allows the death penalty for: premeditated murder, and for some other forms of culpable homicide; some forms of rape, including of a minor (penetrative child sexual abuse), or disabled person; and particular offences against "state security" in a time of war, or in other special circumstances. Death sentences are infrequently carried out, usually being commuted, albeit to lengthy terms of imprisonment. Both UAE nationals and non-Emiratis have been executed for crimes. As of May 2026, the last known execution occurred in February 2025, with three death sentences carried out that month. These were the first executions to occur since 2021.

Executions are carried out by firing squad, the sole legal method. Until 2020, when a new penal code was promulgated, stoning was a possible sentence for hudud offences (those liable to "doctrinal punishments" under sharia), such as adultery or other zina offences. While it has been handed down by courts, the sentence was rare, and often commuted or overturned. No sentences of stoning are known to have ever been carried out in the UAE. The 2020 penal code explicitly excludes imposition of hudud penalties, effectively abolishing stoning as even a theoretical punishment.

== Capital crimes ==
Unlawful killing: Murder, if it is "premeditated or predetermined", is a capital crime. A murder committed against a public servant in the course of their duties will also attract the death penalty, as would any murder committed with a "poisonous or detonating substance". The murder of one's descendants carries a death sentence. Murders committed in the commission of other crimes are also liable to the death penalty.

Other forms of culpable homicide also carry the death penalty: If death results from certain crimes of arson, sexual assault, or kidnapping, the perpetrator can be sentenced to death. If a judicial execution of a death sentence is carried out as the result of perjury or false evidence, the perjurer or false witness is liable to capital punishment. Deaths that are judged to result from an offender's involvement in drug trafficking or supply may be liable to the death penalty.

Sexual offences: Certain sexual offences carry the death penalty. Rape ("forcible sexual intercourse" of a female), if committed against a person under 18, a disabled person or with a health condition that renders them "unable to resist", or someone who is unable to consent, is a capital crime. If the perpetrator is an ascendant (parent, grandparent, etc.), or a non-marriageable (mahram) relative, or someone who raised, cared for, or had authority over the victim, the penalty for the rape is death. Similarly if the offender is a servant of either the victim or those in authority over her, the death penalty applies, as it would if two or more people carry out the crime. Death may be imposed if rape results in the death of the victim. In other circumstances, rape carries a penalty of life imprisonment. Rape of a male ("disgracing intercourse" by "force or threat") carries lesser penalties, unless it results in the death of the victim.

Crimes against state security: Various acts considered detrimental to state security or destabilising to the nation are liable to capital punishment. For example, joining the forces of an enemy country, or of a group that is hostile to the UAE is punishable by death. Several people who have been convicted of joining the Islamic State of Iraq and the Levant (ISIL) have been sentenced (in absentia) to death. The death penalty may be imposed for disclosing military or other state secrets, if the crime occurs when the country is at war. Attempts to overthrow the government or assassinate the president of the UAE are also capital crimes.

== Selected cases ==
On 10 February 2011, Rashid Al Rashidi was executed by firing squad. He was convicted of raping and murdering a four-year-old boy, Moosa Mukhtiar, in the toilets of a mosque on 27 November 2009.

In June 2015, the Federal Supreme Court sentenced an Emirati terrorist, Alaa Bader al-Hashemi, to death for the murder of Ibolya Ryan and planting a "handmade bomb" in an Egyptian-American doctor's home in Abu Dhabi. She committed the crime in December 2014 and was executed at dawn on 13 July 2015.

On 23 November 2017, Nidal Eisa Abdullah, a man who raped and killed an eight-year-old boy in May 2016, was executed.

On 15 February 2025, Shahzadi Khan, a 33-year-old Indian woman from Uttar Pradesh's Banda district, was executed. She had been sentenced to death in Abu Dhabi over an allegation of killing a four-month-old child.

=== Commuted or overturned ===
In 1995, Sarah Balabagan, a Filipino migrant worker, killed her employer in his Al Ain house. The case garnered significant media attention in her native Philippines. She was charged with premeditated murder and sentenced to death by firing squad, and maintained that she killed him in self-defence after he tried to rape her. Following a personal appeal of mercy from then-President Sheikh Zayed bin Sultan Al Nahyan, her sentence was reduced and she was required to pay blood money instead, which was paid by a Filipino businessman.

On 5 April 2022, an Israeli woman was sentenced to death in Abu Dhabi for drug smuggling. Her sentence was later overturned by an appeals court and commuted to life imprisonment.

== See also ==
- Crime in the United Arab Emirates
- Legal system of the United Arab Emirates
