= Mubarak bin Mohammed Al Nahyan =

Emirati royal and politician (1935–2010)

Minister of Interior
- In office 9 December 1971 – 20 November 1990
- President: Zayed bin Sultan Al Nahyan
- Prime Minister: Maktoum bin Rashid Al Maktoum; Rashid bin Saeed Al Maktoum
- Preceded by: Office established
- Succeeded by: Hammouda bin Ali

Personal details
- Born: 1935
- Died: 24 February 2010 (aged 74–75)
- Police career
- Allegiance: Abu Dhabi
- Branch: Abu Dhabi Police
- Service years: 1961–1990
- Rank: Major General
- Children: Nahyan bin Mubarak Al Nahyan; Hamdan bin Mubarak Al Nahyan

Mubarak bin Mohammed Al Nahyan (1935–2010) was an Emirati royal and the first interior minister of the United Arab Emirates. He also held other public posts which were mostly security-related.

== Early life ==
Al Nahyan was born in 1935. He was the second son of Mohammed bin Khalifa Al Nahyan and grandson of Khalifa bin Zayed Al Nahyan. Mubarak's elder brother was Hamdan. He also had younger brothers, Tahnoun and Saif.

== Career ==
Mubarak was close to the rulers of Abu Dhabi. During the reign of Shakhbut bin Sultan, he was named as the director of the police and the public security department in 1961. He replaced Sultan bin Shakbut Al Nahyan as the director of the Abu Dhabi Police. In May 1964 Sheikh Shakhbut removed Bill Edge, a British citizen, from office who had been serving as the commander (it was labelled as commandant) and chairman of the Abu Dhabi Police since 1961 and appointed Mubarak Al Nahyan to this post.

When Zayed bin Sultan succeeded Shakhbut bin Sultan as the ruler of Abu Dhabi in 1966, Mubarak and his brothers, Hamdan, Tahnoun and Saif, assumed major roles due to the fact that Zayed bin Sultan's sons were very young to hold these posts. Mubarak Al Nahyan retained his post as commander of the Abu Dhabi Police under Sheikh Zayed. In 1967 Mubarak Al Nahyan was promoted from the rank of colonel to that of major general. He became the minister of interior of Abu Dhabi in June 1971.

Immediately after the establishment of the United Arab Emirates on 2 December 1971 Mubarak was appointed minister of interior on 9 December to the cabinet led by Maktoum bin Rashid Al Maktoum. Therefore, Mubarak is the first Emirati official to hold this post. He was also appointed minister of interior to the second cabinet of Al Maktoum formed on 23 December 1973.

Mubarak was also made a member of the Abu Dhabi's executive council in December 1973. His term as the commander of the Abu Dhabi Police ended in 1974, and he was replaced by Mohammed Jumaa Al Dhaheri in the post. Mubarak continued to serve as the interior minister of the United Arab Emirates until 20 November 1990. Hammouda bin Ali succeeded him as interior minister.

== Personal life and death ==
His eldest son is Nahyan bin Mubarak Al Nahyan, an Emirati politician. His other son, Hamdan, served as the chairman of Abu Dhabi's Civil Aviation Department and chairman of Gulf Air.

Mubarak Al Nahyan was seriously injured in a road accident in the United Kingdom in 1979. He died on 24 February 2010.

== Awards and legacy ==
Mubarak Al Nahyan was the recipient of the Zayed 2nd Order, the Order of King Abdulaziz and the Qatar Collar of Merit. In 2022 a prize was instituted in memory of him, Sheikh Mubarak bin Mohammed Prize for Natural History.
