= Ministry of Tolerance and Coexistence =

Government ministry of the United Arab Emirates

Agency overview
- Formed: February 16, 2016; 10 years ago
- Headquarters: Abu Dhabi, United Arab Emirates
- Agency executives: Nahyan bin Mubarak al-Nahyan, Minister for Tolerance; H.E. Afraa Al Sabri, Director-General
- Website: tolerance.gov.ae

The Ministry of Tolerance and Coexistence (Note: (Arabic: وِزَارَةُ التَّسَامُحِ وَالتَّعَايُشِ)) is a government ministry in the United Arab Emirates that is in charge of regulating and maintaining religious tolerance and coexistence between indigenous and overseas communities in the country.

== History ==
The ministry was created in February 2016 and was known until 2022 as the Ministry of Tolerance.

The ministry was established in accordance with the National Tolerance Programme, a UAE government initiative of highlighting religious diversity and coexistence among communities in the country. The ministry was the brainchild of UAE Prime Minister Mohammed bin Rashid al-Maktoum. Sheikha Lubna Khalid al-Qasimi served as its inaugural minister until she was succeeded by Nahyan bin Mubarak al-Nahyan in October 2017.

The Ministry promotes a yearly National Festival of Tolerance and Coexistence, featuring cultural performances by different communities. The 2025 edition had China as a guest of honor.

The UAE sees tolerance as a source of "economic capital and attracting skilled migrants, entrepreneurs, and global investment. The tolerance agenda reinforces the country’s image as a safe and aspirational hub". UAE's initiatives are also disseminated by other entities, such as the Hedayah think tank, and the Al Sawab center, focused on countering extremist ideologies worldwide.
