= RAKBANK =

Emirati bank

Rakbank
- Native name: بنك رأس الخيمة
- Formerly: National Bank of Ras Al-Khaimah
- Type: Public Joint Stock Company
- Traded as: ADX: RAKBANK
- ISIN: AEN000601015
- Industry: Banking
- Founded: June 15, 1976; 50 years ago
- Headquarters: Ras Al Khaimah, United Arab Emirates
- Number of locations: 20 (2025)
- Area served: United Arab Emirates
- Key people: Mohammad Omran Alshamsi (Chairman); Raheel Ahmed (CEO)
- Products: Financial services
- Revenue: AED 2,6 billion (2025) (USD 707 million)
- Operating income: AED 5,2 billion (2025) (USD 1,4 billion)
- Total assets: AED 105 billion (2025) (USD 28,59 billion)
- Total equity: AED 14,7 billion (2025) (USD 4 billion)
- Number of employees: 980 (2025)
- Divisions: RAKInsurances; RAKIslamic
- Website: www.rakbank.ae

Rakbank is the trading name of the National Bank of Ras Al-Khaimah PJSC (Arabic: بنك رأس الخيمة), a public joint-stock Emirati bank. It was established in 1976 and is headquartered in the Emirate of Ras Al Khaimah, United Arab Emirates. It is listed on the Abu Dhabi Securities Exchange (ADX).

== History ==
For its first 25 years, the institution operated as a conventional corporate bank. It primarily catered to local businesses. In 2001 the bank was rebranded to Rakbank entering to the Retail banking.

In August 2005 the bank was listed on the Abu Dhabi Securities Exchange.

In 2013, the bank launched RAKIslamic, a dedicated division offering Sharia-compliant personal and business banking products.

In 2015, Rakbank acquired a majority stake in RAK Insurance, enabling it to offer integrated bancassurance products.

In 2025, it became the first traditional bank to offer cryptocurrency trading. In 2026, the bank received approval from the Central Bank of the United Arab Emirates to launch a stablecoin based on the United Arab Emirates dirham.

== Shareholding ==
As of 2025:

Shareholder	Percent owned
Government of Ras Al Khaimah	49.35%
UAE citizens	36.72%
GCC citizens	10.76%
Foreign ownership	2.72%

== See also ==
- List of banks in the United Arab Emirates
