= CERT Group of Companies =

UAE private education company

The Centre of Excellence for Applied Research and Training (CERT)
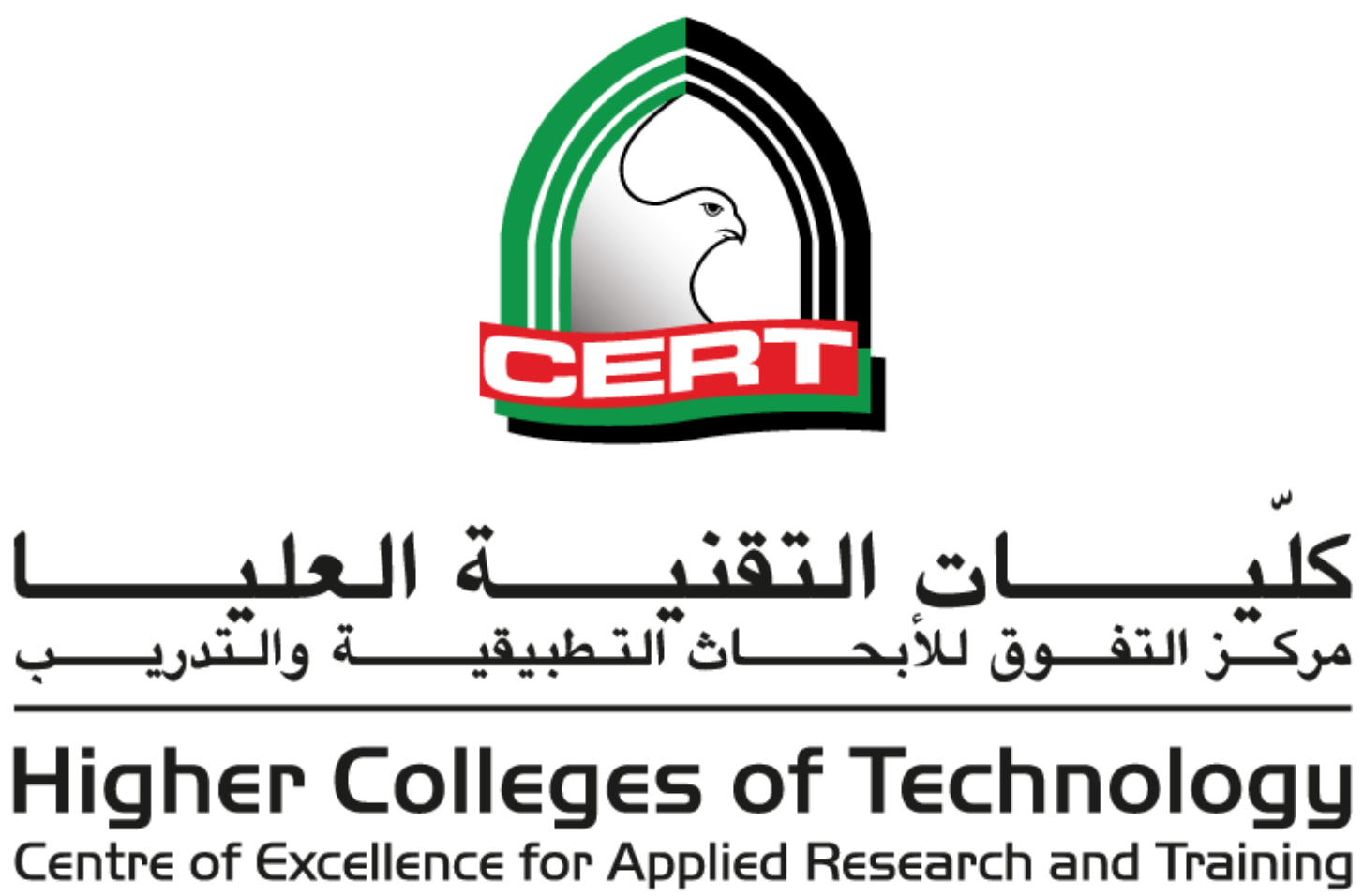
- Company type: Establishment owned by The Higher Colleges of Technology
- Industry: Education
- Founded: Abu Dhabi, United Arab Emirates (1996)
- Founder: Nahyan bin Mubarak Al Nahyan
- Headquarters: Abu Dhabi, United Arab Emirates
- Number of locations: 16 separate campuses across the United Arab Emirates
- Key people: Abdulrahman Al Awar, Chairman; Mohamed Baka, CEO
- Products: Consultancy; Education & training; Technology solutions; Real estate
- Number of employees: 300+ FTE (Post March 2021)
- Subsidiaries: CERT Foundations
- Website: www.cert.ae

The CERT (Centre of Excellence for Applied Research and Training) Group of Companies began as the commercial arm of the Higher Colleges of Technology in the United Arab Emirates, and has grown to be the largest private education provider in the Middle East. CERT is also the largest MENA (Middle East North Africa) investor in the discovery and commercialization of technology, investing US$35 million in 2006.

In 2005, CERT signed Telematics with IBM, that has led to the development of Telematics technology in the United Arab Emirates. CERT provides the only super computing center in the South Asia, Middle East, North Africa region. The CERT Blue Gene supercomputer offers 5.7 teraflops calculating speed to corporate clients for use in biotechnology, nanotechnology, and genetics research as well as oil and gas simulation.

CERT Technology Park in the UAE is home to international companies such as Intel, Honeywell and Lucent Technologies.

== See also ==
- Higher Colleges of Technology
