= Mohammad Omran Alshamsi =

Mohammad Omran Al Shamsi (Arabic: محمد عمران الشامسي) is an Emirati businessperson and former CEO and chairman of Etisalat. He also served as chairman of the UAE's satellite telephony provider, Thuraya. He was also the previous chancellor and chairman of the Higher Colleges of Technology as well as a member of the board of directors of the Arab Satellite Communications Organization (Arabsat).

== Career ==
Al Shamsi joined the UAE's national telecommunications provider Etisalat in 1977, a year after its formation when it was still named Emirtel, having acquired a degree in Electronics and Communications that year from Cairo University. In his biography, Stations, The Journey of Career and Life, he recounts his progress from trainee engineer to become chairman and CEO of the company, which today provides services to 154 million subscribers in 16 countries across the Middle East, Asia and Africa. Three of the group’s brands, Etisalat, Maroc Telecom and Mobily, are among the top 150 most valuable telecom brands in the world. Appointed as chairman in 2005, Al Shamsi retired from Etisalat in 2012. Etisalat was named the most powerful company in the United Arab Emirates by Forbes Middle East at the time.

In 1997 he was appointed as chairman of Thuraya, the UAE-based satellite telephony and data provider, which provides telecommunications coverage in more than 161 countries in Europe, the Middle East, North, Central and East Africa, Asia and Australia. The company launched its first Boeing-built satellite in 2000.

Named as a member of the board of trustees of the Higher Colleges of Technology (HCT) in the UAE in 2005, Al Shamsi was made President of the Higher Colleges in 2013, an appointment that carried Ministerial rank. With 22,000 students and 17 campuses nationwide, HCT is the largest educational institution in the UAE. At the same time, Al Shamsi was also appointed as a member of the board of directors of Khalifa University of Science, Technology and Research, named by the Times Higher Education Asia University Rankings as the top university in the UAE.

Al Shamsi's first act in office at HCT was to reshuffle the management of the organisation, placing Emirati nationals in key management posts. In 2017, Al Shamsi opened HCT to students of all nationalities residing in the UAE, citing education for all as a core principle.

He also serves on the boards of the Ras Al Khaimah University for Medical and Health Sciences, the American University of Ras Al Khaimah and RAK Bank - the national bank of Ras Al Khaimah, the philanthropic organisation, Emirates Foundation, and the Ras Al Khaimah Properties Company.
