= Lubna Khalid Al Qasimi =

United Arab Emirates politician

Sheikha Lubna Khalid Al Qasimi
- لبنى بنت خالد بن سلطان القاسمي
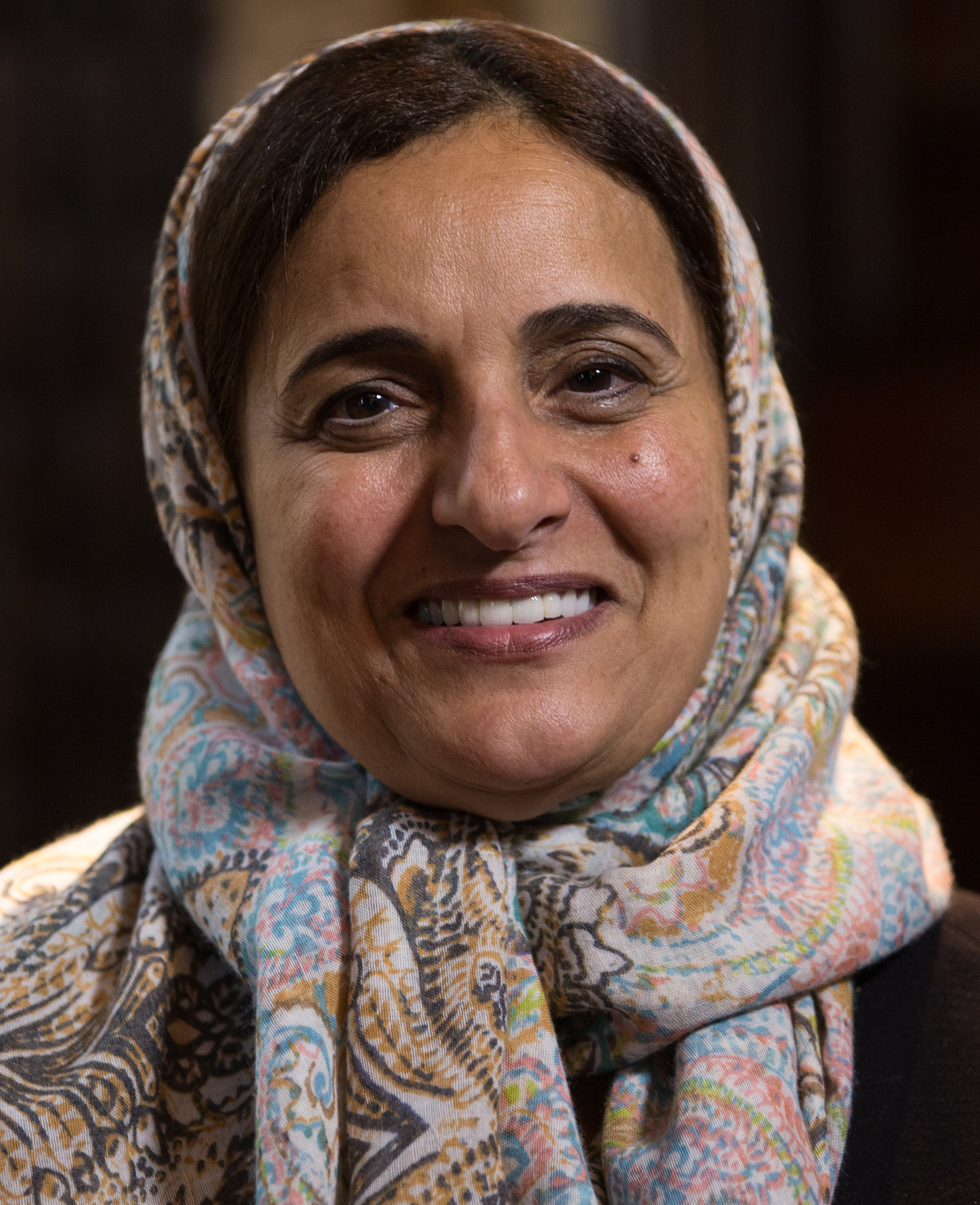

Minister of State for Tolerance
- In office 16 February 2016 – 20 October 2017
- President: Khalifa bin Zayed Al Nahyan
- Prime Minister: Mohammed bin Rashid Al Maktoum
- Preceded by: Post established
- Succeeded by: Nahyan bin Mubarak Al Nahyan

Minister of State for International Cooperation
- In office 6 November 2004 – 15 February 2016
- President: Khalifa bin Zayed Al Nahyan
- Prime Minister: Maktoum bin Rashid Al Maktoum; Mohammed bin Rashid Al Maktoum
- Preceded by: Gamid bin Mahdi
- Succeeded by: Reem Bint Ibrahim Al Hashimy

Minister of Economic and Planning
- In office 6 November 2000 – 3 November 2004
- President: Zayed bin Sultan Al Nahyan
- Prime Minister: Maktoum bin Rashid Al Maktoum
- Preceded by: Gamid bin Mahdi
- Succeeded by: Sultan bin Saeed Al Mansoori

Personal details
- Born: Lubna bint Khalid bin Sultan Al Qasimi; 4 February 1962 (age 64) Dubai, Trucial States (now United Arab Emirates)
- Relatives: Sultan bin Muhammad Al-Qasimi (uncle)

Sheikha Lubna bint Khalid bin Sultan Al Qasimi DBE (Arabic: لبنى بنت خالد بن سلطان القاسمي; born 4 February 1962) is an Emirati politician and member of the ruling family of Sharjah and the niece to Sheikh Sultan bin Muhammad Al-Qasimi. She was previously the Minister of State for Tolerance, Minister of State for International Cooperation, and Minister of Economic and Planning of the United Arab Emirates (UAE). She was the first woman to hold a ministerial post in the UAE.

She has been President of Zayed University since 2014.

== History ==
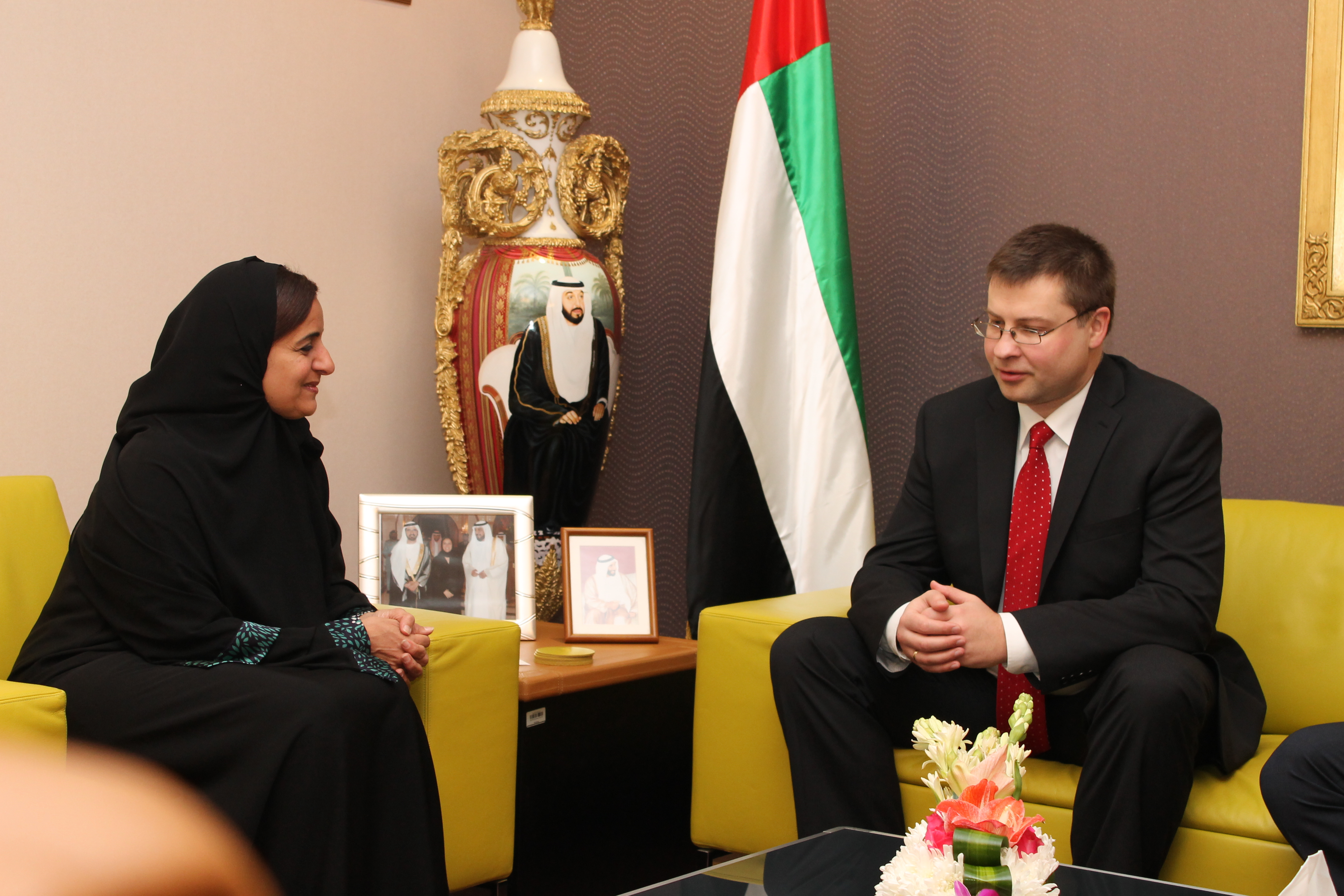
Lubna and Valdis Dombrovskis

Lubna graduated from the California State University, Chico with a bachelor's degree in Computer Science, and has an Executive MBA from the American University of Sharjah. Lubna received an honorary doctorate of science from California State University, Chico.

She returned to the UAE to work as a programmer for software company Datamation in 1981. She was the Dubai branch manager for the General Information Authority, the organization responsible for automating the federal government of the United Arab Emirates. After this posting, she worked for seven years in the Dubai Ports Authority (DPA).

As part of a cabinet reshuffle, the prime minister of the UAE, Mohammed bin Rashid Al Maktoum, announced that Sheikha Lubna would take a post as a minister in the newly established Ministry of Tolerance.

== Honours and awards ==
- 36th most powerful woman in the world by Forbes.
- Lifetime Achievement Award at Asia HRD Congress 2012
- Honorary Dame Commander of The Most Excellent Order of the British Empire, 2013
