= Bank Alfalah =

Pakistani commercial bank

Bank Alfalah Limited
- Formerly: Habib Credit & Exchange Bank Limited (1992–1998)
- Type: Public
- Traded as: PSX: BAFL; KSE 100 component KSE 30 component
- Industry: Banking
- Founded: 1992; 34 years ago
- Headquarters: Karachi, Pakistan
- Key people: H.H. Sheikh Nahayan Mabarak Al Nahayan (chairman); Atif Aslam Bajwa (CEO)
- Products: Loans; credit cards; Debit cards; Savings; Consumer Banking
- Revenue: ▲ Rs. 183.36 billion (US$660 million) (2025)
- Operating income: ▼ Rs. 62.33 billion (US$220 million) (2025)
- Net income: ▼ Rs. 28.33 billion (US$100 million) (2025)
- Total assets: ▲ Rs. 3.82 trillion (US$14 billion) (2025)
- Total equity: ▲ Rs. 197.51 billion (US$710 million) (2025)
- Owner: Abu Dhabi Group
- Number of employees: 17,388 (2025)
- Website: bankalfalah.com

Bank Alfalah Limited (Urdu pronunciation: [bɛŋk al.fə.ˈlaːh] bank-al-fuh-LAH), formerly known as Habib Credit and Exchange Bank, is a Pakistani commercial bank headquartered in Karachi. It is a subsidiary of an Emirati conglomerate, Abu Dhabi Group.

It is one of the largest private banks in Pakistan with a network of more than 1,100 branches in more than 200 cities across Pakistan. It is listed on the Pakistan Stock Exchange.

== History ==
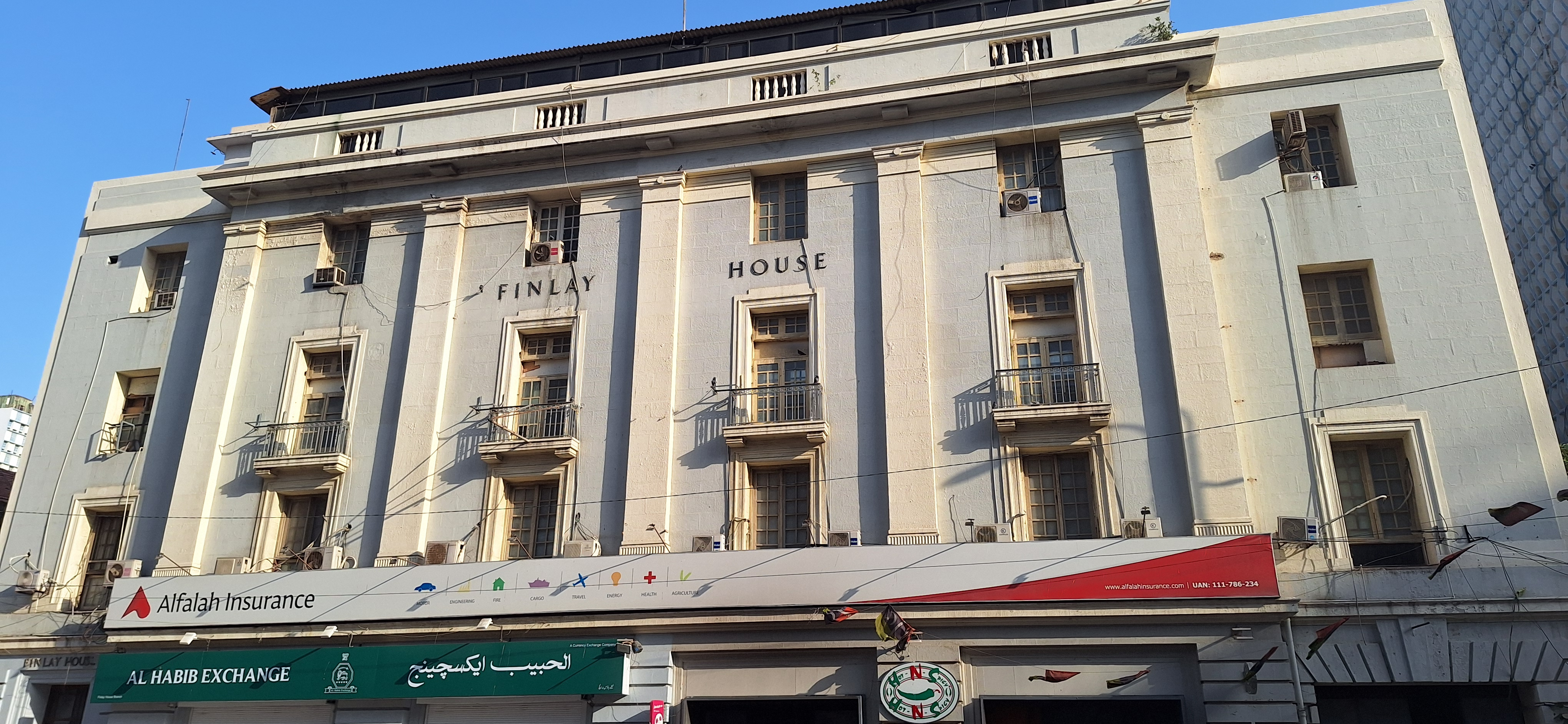
Headquarters of Alfalah Insurance on I.I. Chundrigar Road in Karachi

=== 1992–1998: Habib Credit and Exchange Bank ===
Bank Alfalah traces its origins to the Bank of Credit and Commerce International (BCCI), which had three branches in Pakistan, located in Karachi, Lahore and Rawalpindi. Following the global collapse of BCCI in 1991, the State Bank of Pakistan took over those branches in 1992 to safeguard depositors' interests and reorganised them as Habib Credit and Exchange Bank Limited, operating as a subsidiary of the state-owned Habib Bank Limited.

In July 1997, the Abu Dhabi Group, led by Nahyan bin Mubarak Al Nahyan, acquired a 70 percent stake in then Habib Credit & Exchange Bank (HCEB). The transaction involved the sale of 42 million shares on 7 July 1997 for approximately US$40.54 million.

=== 1998–present: Bank Alfalah ===
Banking operations under new ownership commenced on 1 November 1997, and the bank was formally renamed Bank Alfalah Limited on 25 February 1998. The Abu Dhabi Group acquired the remaining 30 percent of the bank held by the Government of Pakistan in 2002, through a further open auction at Rs27.56 per share, for an aggregate of Rs620.1 million.

In 2004, Bank Alfalah was listed on the Karachi Stock Exchange, following an initial public offering at a strike price of PKR 30 per share. The bank expanded its domestic branch network from three branches in 1997 to 45 branches in 21 cities by the end of 2002, and to over 215 branches by 2007.

During this period, Bank Alfalah also funded Warid Telecom operations in Pakistan after receiving a GSM licence for US$291 million during the Musharraf administration. In 2005, Bank Alfalah began its international expansion and acquired the Bangladesh operations of Shamil Bank of Bahrain for US$17.88 million. In 2005, the bank commenced commercial banking operations in Afghanistan, opening its first branch in Kabul and later expanding to Herat. In 2007, the bank established a Wholesale Banking Unit at the Bahrain Financial Harbour in Manama, operating in the GCC region. The bank also opened branches in the United Arab Emirates and a representative office in Abu Dhabi.

In 2014, the International Finance Corporation (IFC) acquired 15 percent stake in Bank Alfalah for US$67 million.

In May 2023, Bank Alfalah acquired a 7.2 percent equity stake in QistBazaar, a Securities and Exchange Commission of Pakistan-licensed buy now, pay later platform, for Rs140 million, approximately US$1.7 million when combined with embedded financing arrangements. In January 2025, Bank Alfalah acquired a 9.9 percent equity stake in Dubai-based fintech firm Jingle Pay.

In January 2026, Bank Alfalah accepted a non-binding proposal from Ghazanfar Bank to acquire its Afghanistan operations, with regulators in both Pakistan and Afghanistan granting initial approval for due diligence, citing frozen Afghan foreign reserves and uncertainty over international recognition of the Taliban government. In March 2026, Bank Asia PLC of Bangladesh acquired Bank Alfalah's Bangladesh operations for Tk580 crore (US$47.5 million).

== FinCEN ==
Bank Alfalah was named in the FinCEN leak, published by Buzzfeed News and the International Consortium of Investigative Journalists (ICIJ). It had three suspicious transactions flagged for transactions close to 2.5 million dollars of 2 trillion dollars of suspicious payments made globally by banks in 170 countries. The three transactions occurred between 2011-2012.
