= Abdullatif M. Al Shamsi =

UAE academic

- دكتور عبداللطيف الشامسي
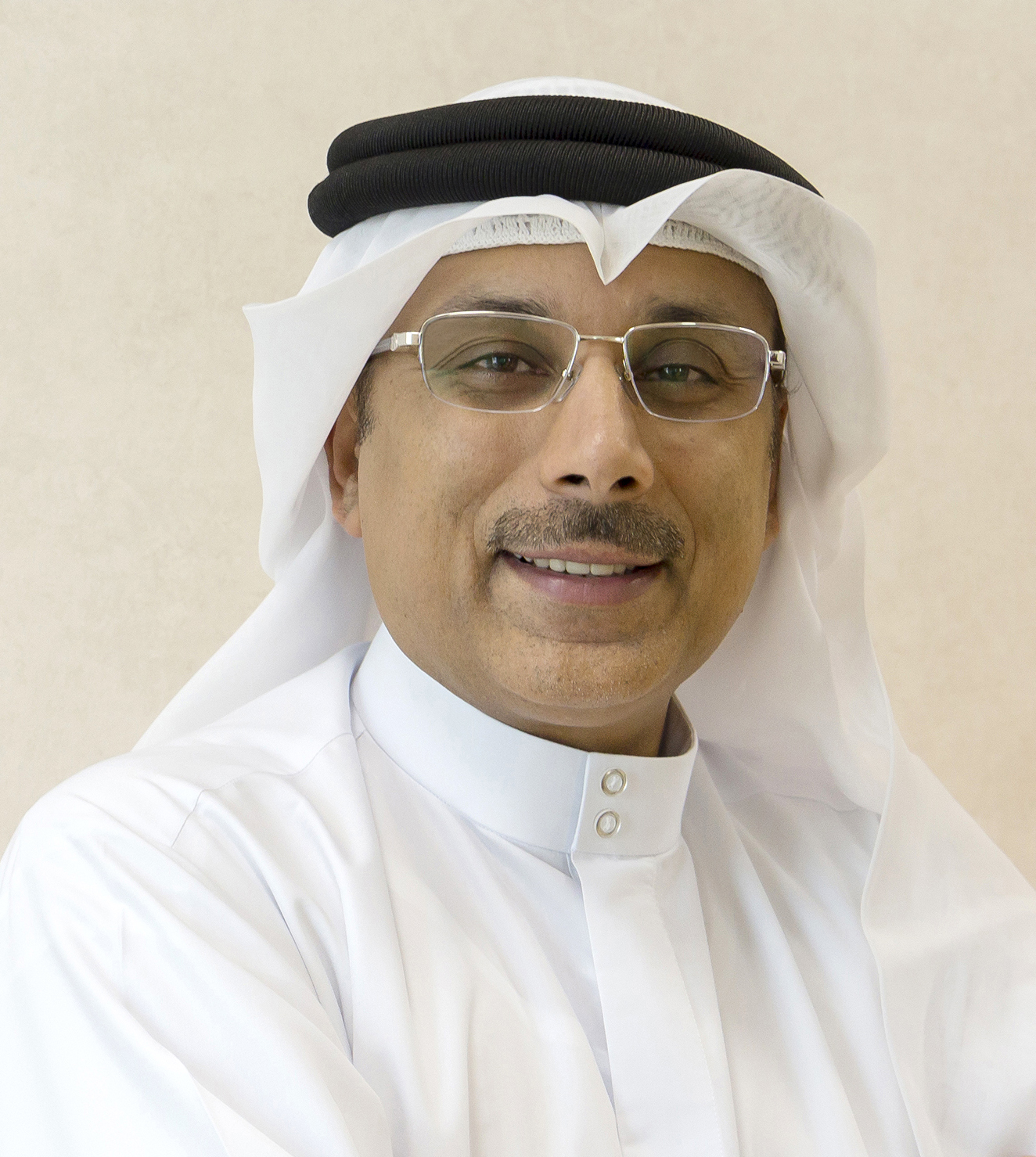
- Al Shamsi in 2016
- Born: United Arab Emirates

Academic background
- Education: Duke University; Boston University

Academic work
- Discipline: Engineering
- Institutions: Professor

Abdullatif M. Al Shamsi (Arabic: دكتور عبداللطيف الشامسي) is an Emirati academic and author focused on technology-oriented educational management. Academic Advisor to HH Sheikha Bodour bint Sultan bin Muhammad Al Qasimi. He was the President & CEO of the non-profit, UAE government owned Higher Colleges of Technology, which is the largest higher education institution in the UAE. He has held this role since March 2015 when he was appointed by Federal Decree by UAE President Sheikh Khalifa bin Zayed Al Nahyan.

Al Shamsi has authored a series of books and published more than 40 research papers in international journals. He speaks regularly at conferences on topics such as pedagogical approaches in education, mechanical engineering, change management during crises, and technology integration in educational practices.

As head of HCT, which has 23,000 enrolled students attending 16 campuses, he introduced a 'hybrid' system, which combines traditional classroom education with remote learning. This was implemented throughout the pandemic, allowing classes to continue uninterrupted.

In recognition of attainment against the UK Professional Standards Framework in higher education (Advance HE), Al Shamsi is the first Emirati to achieve the status of Principal Fellow (PFHEA).

== Education ==
Al Shamsi received his Ph.D. from Duke University (Durham, North Carolina), and his M.Sc. and B.Sc. both from Boston University (Boston, Massachusetts).

== Career ==
Al Shamsi started his academic career at UAE University as an associate professor, later holding the position of assistant vice chancellor for research where he founded a University-wide Internship and Work Integrated Learning (iWIL) program. Prior to his appointment in HCT, Al Shamsi was the managing director of the Institute of Applied Technology (IAT) from 2007 until the end of 2014, where he managed the Applied Technology High Schools (ATHS), Fatima College for Health Sciences, and Abu Dhabi Polytechnic since the inception.

Al Shamsi is also the vice chairman of the board of trustees of the Institute of Applied Technology (IAT), and vice chairman of the board of directors of the Abu Dhabi Maritime Academy (ADMA). He has previously been a board of trustees member of the Emirates College for Advanced Education (ECAE), and a member of the Board of Directors of the Emirates Schools Establishment. These are in addition to his memberships of several higher committees and educational advisory councils, such as the Emirates College for Advanced Education, and the Higher Committee for Aqdar World Summit.

== Initiatives and achievements ==
Under Al Shamsi's tenure Higher Colleges of Technology has launched several notable initiatives.

Higher Colleges of Technology 4.0 Strategic Plan

Al Shamsi led the HCT 4.0 Strategic Plan (2017-2021), which was announced UAE Vice President and Prime Minister and Dubai Ruler Sheikh Mohammed bin Rashid Al Maktoum in 2019. saw the establishment of Sector Skills Academies to provide students with multiple career pathways, coupled with flexible and agile workforce development programs. The plan also offered Professional Certification Qualifications (where students gain an academic and professional qualifications concurrently) and a Fast-Track degree system for high-achieving students to receive a bachelor's degree in three years

HCT 4.0 has three pillars at its core, including Technical Leaders, No Emirati Left Behind, and Graduating Companies, all designed to make Emiratis more employable and help them to become entrepreneurs and innovators. As part of the pillar of graduating companies, HCT is the first institution to establish an economic free zone within the campuses in order to fulfilling its mandate, not only to graduate students, but also to graduate companies.

COVID-19 & Digital Transformation

With the onset of the COVID-19 pandemic, and the resultant closure of in-person classes in the UAE, Al Shamsi led HCT's transformation from on-campus to 100 per cent online or remote learning.

A new Hybrid Education Model, based on a blend on online classes and assessments and on-campus learning, has been implemented at HCT based on the university's COVID-19 experience. These are detailed in the whitepaper, From Crisis to Achievement Amid the COVID-19 Pandemic.

The 3D Persona

Al Shamsi formulated a human resource development model he calls "Future Persona 4.0", which seeks to create well-rounded individuals through a combination of the 'Digital Persona', 'Professional Persona', and 'Entrepreneurial Persona'. Designed to help graduates succeed in the post-COVID-19 era, the "3D Persona" includes a set of valuable traits that future students should have to be able to invest their skills and abilities, and deal with the changes and challenges in the labor market.

Awards

In March 2021, Al Shamsi was named among the top CEOs of 2020 in CEO Today Magazine. He was also among the winners of CEO Today Global Awards 2021. In 2017, he won the 5th Federal Personality Award, which is presented by Sheikh Mohammed Bin Zayed Al Nahyan, Deputy Supreme Commander of the UAE Armed Forces, and Chairman of the Emirates Center for Strategic Studies and Research (ECSSR). The award recognized Al Shamsi's contributions to furthering higher education in the UAE.

== Recent list of publications ==
Al Shamsi has published and presented more than 40 research publications in world-class scientific journals and at international conferences. His latest publication is a series of books published in Arabic entitled: "The Make of Education."

- AlShamsi, A. M., (2014) "Welcome to iPad Generation". Kalima Press, Abu Dhabi, UAE.
- AlShamsi, A. M., (2011) "The Make of Education". ISBN 978-9948-14-449-6, 1st Ed. (132 pages). The Emirates Center for Strategic Studies and Research Press, Abu Dhabi, UAE.
- AlShamsi, A. M., (2005) "Partnership between Educational Institutions and Society: Education is a Societal Responsibility." ISBN 9948-03-205-5, 1st Ed. (111 pages). Dar AlKhaleej Press, Sharjah, UAE.

Education Blogs published

- The Professional Learner, published 13-04-2020 Sharik.ae
- Empowering through Emiratization, published 17-11-2019 Sharik.ae
- Professional Persona, published 10-06-2020 Sharik.ae
- Disrupting Education, published 28-05-2020 Sharik.ae
- The Economics of Education, published 08-06-2020 Sharik.ae
- Digital Persona, published 07-05-2020 Sharik.ae
- Future Persona, published 06-05-2020 Sharik.ae
- Embracing Remote Student Life, published 06-05-2020 Sharik.ae
- Yes, We Are Ready, published 13-04-2020 Sharik.ae
- What Does the Post-Remote Learning Future Hold?, published 06-05-2020 Sharik.ae
- The CEO - The Pedagogue, published 12-07-2020 Sharik.ae

Harvard Business Review (Arabic)

- The Persona 4.0 outlines the attributes of graduates for the post-COVID times, published October 2020

Higher Education Digest

- Persona 4.0: A quantum leap in Education outcomes, published 14-10-2020 Education Digest, October 14, 2020

ITP Media Group

- HCT preparing Graduates for Life & Work

Al Ittihad newspaper interview

- Al Shamsi, HCT President & CEO interview Ittihad newspaper, November 2, 2020
