= Hamdan bin Mubarak Al Nahyan =

Emirati politician

Hamdan bin Mubarak al Nahyan

Minister of Higher Education and Scientific Research
- In office 2013–2014
- Preceded by: Nahyan bin Mubarak Al Nahyan

Personal details
- Born: 1959 (age 66–67)
- Relations: Nahyan bin Mubarak Al Nahyan (brother); Khalifa bin Zayed bin Khalifa Al Nahyan (great grandfather)
- Parent: Mubarak bin Mohammed Al Nahyan (father)
- Education: UAE University

Styles of Sheikh Hamdan bin Mubarak al Nahyan
- Reference style: His Excellency
- Spoken style: Your Excellency

Hamdan bin Mubarak al Nahyan (Arabic: حمدان بن مبارك آل نهيان; born 1959) is a member of the Al Nahyan family in the United Arab Emirates. He became the Minister of Higher Education and Scientific Research in March 2013, a post that his brother, Nahyan bin Mubarak Al Nahyan had held for 23 years.

== Early life and education ==
Hamdan bin Mubarak was born in 1959. He is the son of Mubarak bin Mohammed Al Nahyan, former interior minister. He is a grandson of Mohammed bin Khalifa Al Nahyan, who is himself the grandson of Zayed bin Khalifa Al Nahyan.

Sheikh Hamdan holds a BSc degree in Economics from UAE University, and took advanced aviation courses in the UK.

== Career ==
He has held a number of official positions in the UAE, including chairman of the board of the Sheikh Zayed Housing Program, which approves housing benefits for Emirati citizens. He is chairman of the board of the National Transport Authority, Chairman of the National Media Council and Chairman of the Higher Committee for UAE Civil Seaports & Airports Security. He served as the General Manager of the Department of Civil Aviation in Abu Dhabi, and later became chairman of the board. Sheikh Hamdan served as the UAE Minister of Public Works from 2004 until March 2013. As such, he created policies promoting environmental sustainability.

Sheikh Hamdan has also held the position of chairman of the board of several private companies, primarily concerned with aviation. These include Royal Jet, Abu Dhabi Aviation, Gulf Air, and Gulf Aircraft Maintenance Company (GAMCO. He is also chairman of the board for the National Corporation for Tourism and Hotels, the Sharia investments firm Arady, and the Bank Al Falah-Pakistan.
