= Emirates national identity card =

United Arab Emirates identity document

Emirates National Identity Card
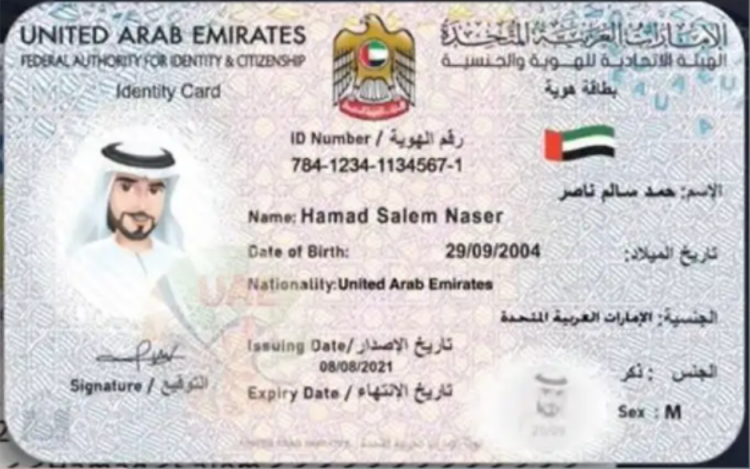
- Emirates ID Card For UAE Nationals (New version)

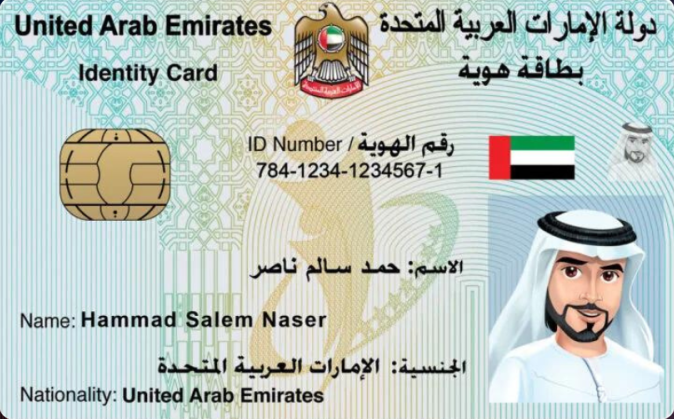
- Emirates ID Card For UAE Nationals (Old Version)
- Type: Identity card, optional replacement for passport for Emiratis in Gulf Cooperation Council
- Issued by: United Arab Emirates: Federal Authority for Identity, Citizenship, Customs and Port Security (ICP)
- First issued: 2004; 22 years ago (First version); 2021; 5 years ago (Current version)
- Purpose: Identification & Travel Document
- Valid in: GCC
- Expiration: 5 years for under 21, 10 years for 21 and above (Emiratis); 5 years (GCC nationals); Validity matches the duration of the residence visa (Expats)
- Cost: Emiratis, 100 For 5 Years; 200 For 10 Years; GCC Citizens; 100 For 5 Years; Residents; 100 For each year of residence

The Emirates Identity Card, also known as Emirates ID or EID, is a mandatory identification card issued to citizens and residents of the United Arab Emirates (UAE). It is an essential document for accessing government services, legal processes, and other key functions within the country. Managed by the Federal Authority for Identity, Citizenship, Customs and Port Security (ICP), the Emirates ID card plays a critical role in verifying an individual's identity and facilitating transactions in both the public and private sectors.

== History ==
The Emirates ID system was introduced as part of the UAE government's efforts to enhance national security, streamline public services, and modernize the identification process. Initially launched in 2004, the initiative aimed to replace traditional paper-based identity documents with a secure, digital alternative. Over the years, the Emirates ID card has undergone several upgrades to incorporate advanced technological features.

== Features ==
The Emirates ID card includes the following features:

1. Personal Information: The card displays the holder's full name, nationality, date of birth, and a unique 15-digit identification number.
2. Photograph and Signature: A digital photograph and an electronic signature of the cardholder are included.
3. Chip Technology: An embedded microchip stores encrypted personal data, biometric information (such as fingerprints), and other relevant details.
4. Security Elements: The card incorporates advanced security features such as holograms, UV-sensitive ink, and a secure laminate to prevent counterfeiting and tampering.

== Registration ==
Citizens and residents inside the UAE must register into the program. Infants born in the UAE are issued a card at birth, though biometrics (including fingerprint and retina scan) are only captured after the card holder turns 15.

== Uses ==
The Emirates ID card is used for various purposes, including:

- Identification: It serves as the primary proof of identity for residents and citizens within the UAE.
- Access to Services: The card is required for accessing government services such as healthcare, education, and social services.
- Financial Transactions: Many financial institutions in the UAE require the Emirates ID for opening bank accounts, applying for loans, and other transactions.
- Travel: UAE citizens can use the card for travel within the Gulf Cooperation Council (GCC) countries.
- Voting: Eligible citizens use the Emirates ID to vote in Federal National Council elections

=== Integration with Smart Services ===
The UAE government has integrated the Emirates ID with various smart services and e-government platforms. This integration facilitates online transactions, reduces paperwork, and enhances the efficiency of public service delivery. The card can be used to access the UAE Pass, a digital identity and signature solution that enables secure login to government and private sector services.

=== Legal Framework ===
The issuance and regulation of the Emirates ID card are governed by Federal Law No. 9 of 2006 on Population Register and Identity Card, along with subsequent amendments. The law mandates that all citizens and residents of the UAE must obtain and carry an Emirates ID card.
