= Higher Colleges of Technology =

Educational institution in the United Arab Emirates

Coordinates: 24.5°N 54.5°E

- كليّات التقنيّة العليا
- Type: Federal
- Established: 1988
- Faculty: 1164
- Administrative staff: 948
- Students: 23,000
- Location: 16 separate campuses (Note: Located in the emirates of Abu Dhabi, Al Ain, Dubai, Fujairah, Madinat Zayed, Ras Al Khaimah, Ruwais and Sharjah.) across the United Arab Emirates
- Colours: White; red; green; black
- Mascot: Falcon
- Website: www.hct.ac.ae

The Higher Colleges of Technology (HCT) (Arabic: كليّات التقنيّة العليا) is a public institute of technology with 16 campuses and facilities throughout the United Arab Emirates. Founded in 1988 by Sheikh Nahyan bin Mubarak al-Nahyan, it is the largest applied higher educational institution in the country.

During the 2019–2020 academic year, there were 14,889 female and 7,333 male students enrolled at 16 campuses and six academic divisions throughout the country. More than 71,000 UAE nationals are graduates of the institution.

The HCT has formal alliances with a number of international tertiary education and training institutions, and corporate partnerships with local and multinational companies. Some programs have international accreditation: for example, the HCT's Bachelor of Education degree was developed with, and is certified by the University of Melbourne.

HCT is the first educational institution in the UAE to be named as an economic free zone, as declared in the Fifty-Year Charter of Sheikh Mohammed Bin Rashid Al Maktoum, UAE prime minister and ruler of Dubai. It is one of the first six higher education institutions in the world to receive accreditation from the Quality Assurance Agency (QAA), UK’s global leader in quality assurance for higher education.

The CERT (Centre of Excellence for Applied Research and Training) is the commercial arm of the Higher Colleges of Technology, developing and providing education, training and applied technology for public and private sector clients, since 1996.

The HCT chancellor is Abdulrahman Abdulmannan Al Awar, UAE Minister of Human Resources & Emiratization. Tayeb A. Kamali was appointed as the vice chancellor in June 2005. Mohammed Omran Al Shamsi was made President of the Higher Colleges in 2013, an appointment that carried Ministerial rank. On March 17, 2015 Abdullatif M. Al Shamsi was appointed as HCT vice chancellor, by Federal Decree. He was subsequently appointed to the role of HCT president and CEO. In September 2022, Faisal Al Ayyan was appointed as HCT president and CEO.

HCT is accredited by the Commission for Academic Accreditation (CAA), the UAE Federal Government's quality assurance agency for higher education.

== History ==
In 1985, Sheikh Nahayan Mabarak Al Nahayan, Chancellor of the United Arab Emirates University, made a commitment to establish a new system of post-secondary education for UAE Nationals that would stress the ideals of productivity, self-determination, and excellence.

In 1988, Federal Law No 2 established the Higher Colleges of Technology (HCT).

== Campuses ==
The Higher Colleges of Technology has 16 campuses across the UAE, with separate male and female campuses located in the cities of Al Ain, Abu Dhabi, Dubai, Fujairah, Madinat Zayed, Ras Al Khaimah, Ruwais and Sharjah. In August 2023, it opened a new campus in Baniyas, Abu Dhabi, replacing its campuses located in Abu Dhabi city.

=== Ras Al Khaimah Women's campus ===
Ras Al Khaimah Women's campus (RKW) has over 1,800 students and offers a wide variety of business and technical courses for Emirati women in Ras Al Khaimah.

=== The HCT-Sharjah Men's and Women's campuses ===
The HCT-Sharjah campuses are two of the 16 colleges that compose the Higher Colleges of Technology (HCT) in the United Arab Emirates (UAE). The Sharjah Women's campus (SJW) was established in 1997 and the Sharjah Men's campus (SJM) in 1998.

The current executive director of the Sharjah campuses is Khaled Al Hammadi.

=== Madinat Zayed and Ruwais campuses ===
New campuses were opened in 2007 for both men and women in the Al Dhafrah region of the Abu Dhabi Emirate in the cities of Madinat Zayed and Ruwais. The current executive director of the Madinat Zayed and Ruwais campuses is Abdu Rahman Al Jahoushi.

== Initiatives ==
- It created a 3D Printed Ventilator Splitter for treating multiple patients with a single ventilator in hospitals’ Intensive Care Units.
- It launched the UAE’s first Artificial Intelligence Academy, with the National Program for Artificial intelligence.
- It became the UAE's first approved university economic free zone with the inauguration of the HCT InnCuVation Spaces.
- Agreed with the Ministry of Human Resources and Emiratization (MOHRE) to provide training and upskilling for 18,000 Emirati students through the National Training Program.
- It became the UAE's first government higher education institution to obtain 100% accreditation of its academic programs, through the UAE's Commission for Academic Accreditation (CAA).

== Notable alumni ==
- Saeed Al Nazari, UAE government officials
- Hala Badri, director general of Dubai Culture and Arts Authority
- Sara Musallam, business woman and politician
