= Zayed University =

Public university in the United Arab Emirates

Coordinates: 25.102019°N 55.385599°E

- جامعة زايد
- Other name: ZU
- Motto: Your success is our legacy
- Established: 1998; 28 years ago
- President: Kevin Hall
- Students: 7,748
- Location: Abu Dhabi and Dubai, UAE
- Campus: Urban
- Website: www.zu.ac.ae

Zayed University (ZU; Arabic: جامعة زايد) is a public university in the United Arab Emirates. It has campuses in Dubai and Abu Dhabi.

== History ==
Zayed University was founded in 1998 to provide technical education for women. The school is named after Sheikh Zayed bin Sultan Al Nahyan, the first President of the United Arab Emirates. In 2008, Zayed University opened admissions for male students.

== Accreditation ==
University rankings

Global – Overall
- QS World: 701–710 (2024)
- THE World: 401–500 (2024)

The Zayed University is accredited by the UAE Commission for Academic Accreditation, and the Middle States Commission on Higher Education.

The university was ranked 19th in the 2024 QS World University Arab Rankings.

In 2008, Zayed University received accreditation from the Commission on Higher Education of the Middle States Association of Colleges and Schools. It received re-accreditation in 2013.

Between December 7, 2023, and October 31, 2023, the Commission requested reports demonstrating compliance with its accreditation standards. In June 2024, Zayed University provided the commission's requested reports.

In the same month, the Commission reaffirmed the university's accreditation and confirmed compliance with all Middle States accreditation standards. The renewed accreditation will remain valid until the 2030/2031 academic year.

Through the Council for Accreditation of Educator Preparation Continuous Improvement Commission (CAEP), the College of Education received accreditation from the National Council for Accreditation of Teacher Education for its B.S. Communication and Media Sciences, in 2013.

== Colleges and academic programs ==
Zayed University provides seventeen undergraduate majors, ten undergraduate minors, and ten master's degrees. Zayed University has eight colleges: the College of Arts and Creative Enterprises, the College of Business, the College of Communication and Media Sciences, the College of Education, the College of Humanities and Social Sciences, the College of Natural and Health Sciences, the College of Technological Innovation, and the College of Interdisciplinary Studies.

== Research ==
Zayed University supports faculty and student research through research training programs, fellowships, and grants. In 2014, the university invested around 4.6 million AED in internal research funds.

=== Grants and fellowships ===
- Research Incentive Funds (RIF)

This grant funds faculty research throughout one to two years and was designed to support and enhance the research culture at Zayed University. Researchers receive grants that range from a maximum of 30,000AED for individual one-year projects to a maximum of 150,000AED for team grants.

- Research Clusters

A new initiative was established in 2016 to encourage cross-discipline collaboration among faculty. A maximum of 50,000 AED per project is allocated.

=== Undergraduate research ===
The Undergraduate Research Scholars Program was launched in 2010 to encourage and support undergraduate student research. The program provides students with faculty mentorship, workshops, and lectures over a two-and-a-half-year period during their studies. Students are expected to produce original research that is submitted to international academic journals at the end of the program.

== Campuses ==
=== Abu Dhabi ===
The Abu Dhabi campus of Zayed University was completed in August 2011 to accommodate the university's growing student population and is located in Zayed City. It covers 77 hectares of land with a total area of 188,500 square meters. The campus was designed by German-Iranian architect Hadi Teherani.

=== Dubai ===
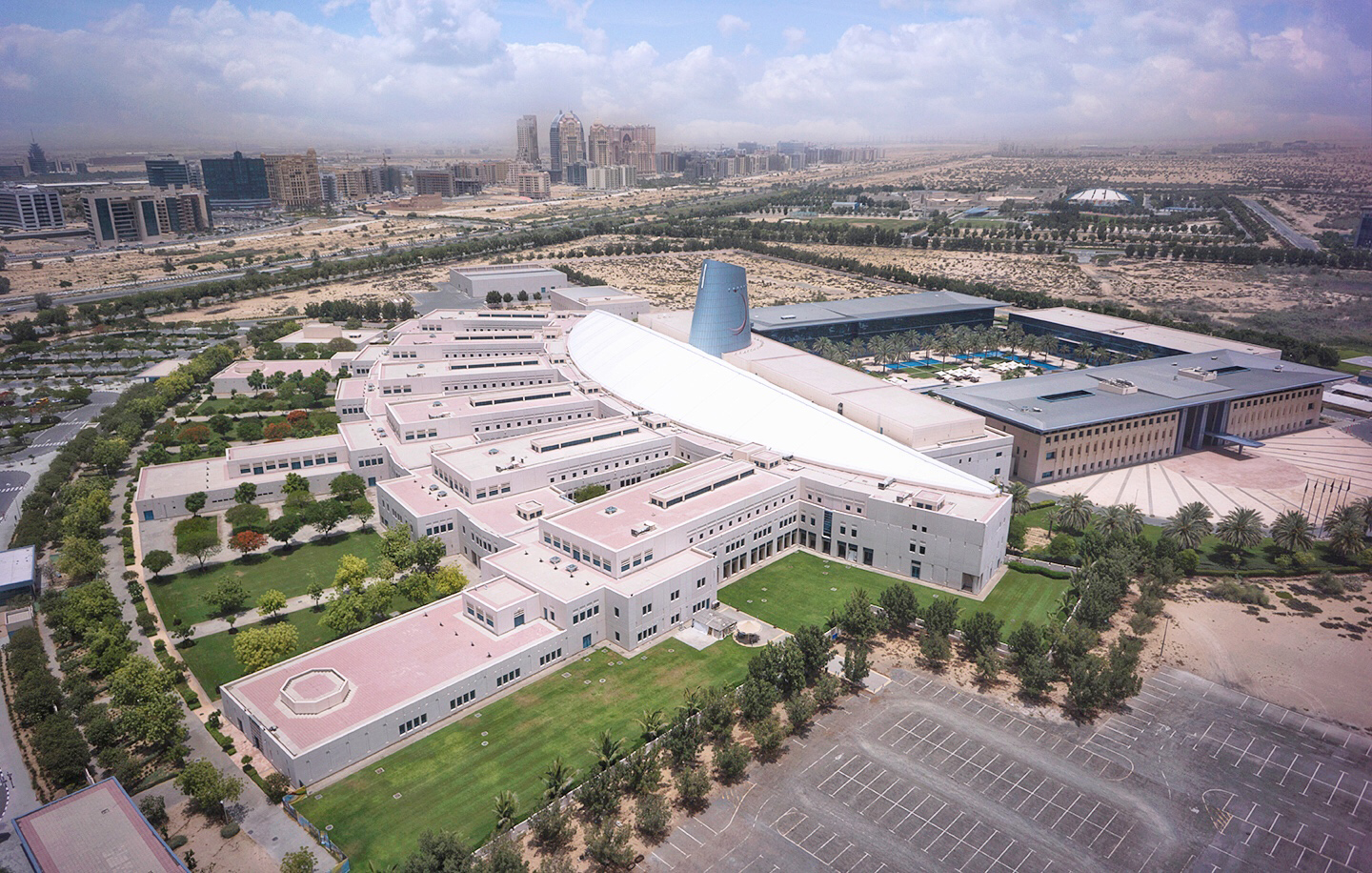
Photo of the Dubai campus

The university's Dubai campus moved to its current location in Al Ruwayyah, near Academic City, Dubai, in 2006. It was previously located at the northern end of the Abu Dhabi peninsula, on Delma Street.

In November 2018, The Zayed University Food Court, situated in Academic City, Dubai, was designed and built.

== Academic performance ==
=== Management performance-management Office ===
In December 2010, the Federal National Council (FNC) investigated the competency of Zayed University's senior management. According to The National, Zayed University was reported to owe over Dh33 million in unpaid water and electricity bills.

According to The National, three people held the position of provost between April and June 2011, bringing the total to seven provosts between 1998 and 2011 .

In 2012, the effectiveness of Zayed University's teacher education program was investigated. According to The National, none of the 110 teachers the university produced between 2010 and 2012 were employed by the Abu Dhabi Education Council (ADEC) which allegedly claimed the university produced "lazy and poorly skilled graduates".

Following Sheikh Nahyan bin Mubarak Al Nahyan, Maitha Al Shamsi was instated as president in 2013. Al Shamsi was followed by Lubna Khalid Al Qasimi, who was appointed president in 2014. In July 2023, Shamma Al Mazrui, the UAE's Minister of Community Development, was appointed as the new chair of the board of trustees. Concerns over academic integrity, transparency, and plagiarism at Zayed University are ongoing, questions have been raised about the weak academic credentials and lack of international experience among the new management.

== Controversies ==
Professor Matt J. Duffy expressed concern that his activities, including "writing for Gulf News, starting a student chapter of the Society of Professional Journalists, and teaching objectively about the U.A.E.'s media law," may have led to his dismissal. Although the MSCHE Self-Study claims to follow Article 19 of the United Nations Universal Declaration of Human Rights ("Everyone has the right to freedom of opinion and expression; this right includes freedom to hold opinions without interference and to seek, receive, and impart information and ideas through any media regardless of frontiers"), the university refuses to comment publicly on the case.

Materials deemed to be offensive are removed from the university library or placed in a locked storage area called Special Collections. Students must obtain faculty approval to access these materials, which include books on nursing, art, human sexuality, and books containing critical views of religion. Librarians at Zayed University are instructed to consider censorship and culturally appropriate attitudes toward access and authority when teaching information literacy.
