= Federal Supreme Court of the United Arab Emirates =

Highest court in United Arab Emirates

Supreme Court of the United Arab Emirates
- المحكمة الاتحادية العليا
- Interactive map of Supreme Court of the United Arab Emirates
- 24.4607221°N 54.32998690°E
- Established: 2 August 1973
- Location: Abu Dhabi
- Coordinates: 24.4607221°N 54.32998690°E
- Composition method: Presidential appointment
- Authorised by: Constitution of the United Arab Emirates
- Number of positions: 20
- Website: https://www.moj.gov.ae/en/about-moj/federal-supreme-court.aspx

The Federal Supreme Court of the United Arab Emirates (sometimes called the Union Supreme Court) is the highest federal court in the United Arab Emirates. The Federal Supreme Court looks into challenges made by litigants to judgments issued by the Federal Court of Appeal. It also holds original jurisdiction over certain matters, such as disputes between emirates. The court falls under the authority of the Ministry of Justice.

Being the highest judicial instance in the UAE does not mean that its jurisdiction applies to all seven Emirates: Dubai and Ras Al Khayma have their own local judicial system. Article 96 of the UAE Constitution reads as follows "The Supreme Court of the Union shall consist of a President and a number of Judges, not exceeding five in all, who shall be appointed by decree, issued by the President of the Union after approval by the Supreme Council."

The president and the members of the Supreme Court can by no means be removed from their offices, except in the following cases: death, resignation, completion of term or secondment, retirement, permanent disability that prevent a judge from undertaking their duties, disciplinary discharge and finally "appointment to other offices, with their agreement".

The judgments of the Emirati Supreme Court cover matters like miscellaneous disputes raising between the Member Emirates, constitutionality, constitution interpretation, interrogation of senior officials of the Union (like Ministers), and crimes threatening affecting the interests of the Union. Article 101 of the Emirati Constitution stipulates that "The judgements of the Supreme Court of the Union shall be final and binding upon all."

The President of the Federal Supreme Court of the United Arab Emirates is Mohammad Bin Hamad Al Badi.
