= List of prime ministers of the United Arab Emirates =

Prime Minister of the United Arab Emirates
- رئيس مجلس الوزراء دولة الإمارات العربية المتحدة
- Emblem of the United Arab Emirates

- Flag of the United Arab Emirates

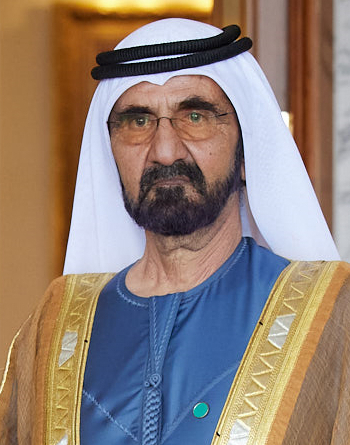
- Incumbent; Mohammed bin Rashid Al Maktoum since 11 February 2006
- Executive branch of the Federal Government of the United Arab Emirates; Cabinet of the United Arab Emirates
- Style: His Highness
- Type: Head of government
- Member of: Cabinet of the United Arab Emirates
- Reports to: President
- Residence: Zabeel Palace
- Seat: Dubai
- Appointer: President
- Constituting instrument: Constitution of the United Arab Emirates
- Inaugural holder: Maktoum bin Rashid Al Maktoum
- Formation: 9 December 1971; 54 years ago
- Deputy: Deputy Prime Minister
- Salary: AED 80,000 monthly
- Website: sheikhmohammed.ae/en-us

The prime minister of the United Arab Emirates is the head of government of the federal government of the United Arab Emirates. While not required by the UAE constitution, the practice is that the ruler of Dubai serve as the prime minister and as a vice president of the UAE.

The first prime minister, Sheikh Maktoum bin Rashid Al Maktoum, took office on 9 December 1971. He left office on 25 April 1979 and was succeeded by his father Sheikh Rashid bin Saeed Al Maktoum, the vice president of the United Arab Emirates. Every prime minister since has also held the title of vice president. Upon the death of Sheikh Rashid bin Saeed Al Maktoum on 7 October 1990, his son Sheikh Maktoum bin Rashid Al Maktoum became prime minister for a second time. Upon Sheikh Maktoum bin Rashid Al Maktoum's death on 11 February 2006 while on a visit to the Gold Coast of Australia, his younger brother Sheikh Mohammed bin Rashid Al Maktoum, the current prime minister, succeeded him.

The prime minister chairs the Council of Ministers, which meets once a week in the capital, Abu Dhabi.

== List of officeholders (1971–present) ==
No.	Portrait	Name (Lifespan)	Term of office			Deputy
No.	Portrait	Name (Lifespan)	Took office	Left office	Time in office	Deputy
1		Maktoum bin Rashid Al Maktoum مكتوم بن راشد آل مكتوم (1943–2006)	9 December 1971	30 April 1979	7 years, 142 days	Hamdan bin Rashid Al Maktoum (1971–1973); Khalifa bin Zayed Al Nahyan (1974–1977); Hamdan bin Mohammed Al Nahyan (1977–1979)
2		Rashid bin Saeed Al Maktoum راشد بن سعيد آل مكتوم (1912–1990)	30 April 1979	7 October 1990 (Died in office)	11 years, 160 days	Hamdan bin Mohammed Al Nahyan; Maktoum bin Rashid Al Maktoum (1979–1990)
3		Maktoum bin Rashid Al Maktoum مكتوم بن راشد آل مكتوم (1943–2006)	7 October 1990	4 January 2006 (Died in office)	15 years, 89 days	Sultan bin Zayed Al Nahyan (1990–2009); Hamdan bin Zayed Al Nahyan (1997–2009)
4		Mohammed bin Rashid Al Maktoum محمد بن راشد آل مكتوم (born 1949)	11 February 2006	Incumbent	20 years, 208 days	Saif bin Zayed Al Nahyan; Mansour bin Zayed Al Nahyan (2009–present); Maktoum bin Mohammed Al Maktoum (2021–present); Hamdan bin Mohammed Al Maktoum; Abdullah bin Zayed Al Nahyan (2024–present)

== See also ==
- President of the United Arab Emirates
- Vice President of the United Arab Emirates
