= List of deputy prime ministers of the United Arab Emirates =

Deputy Prime Minister of the United Arab Emirates
- نائب رئيس مجلس الوزراء دولة الإمارات العربية المتحدة
- Emblem of the UAE

- Flag of the United Arab Emirates

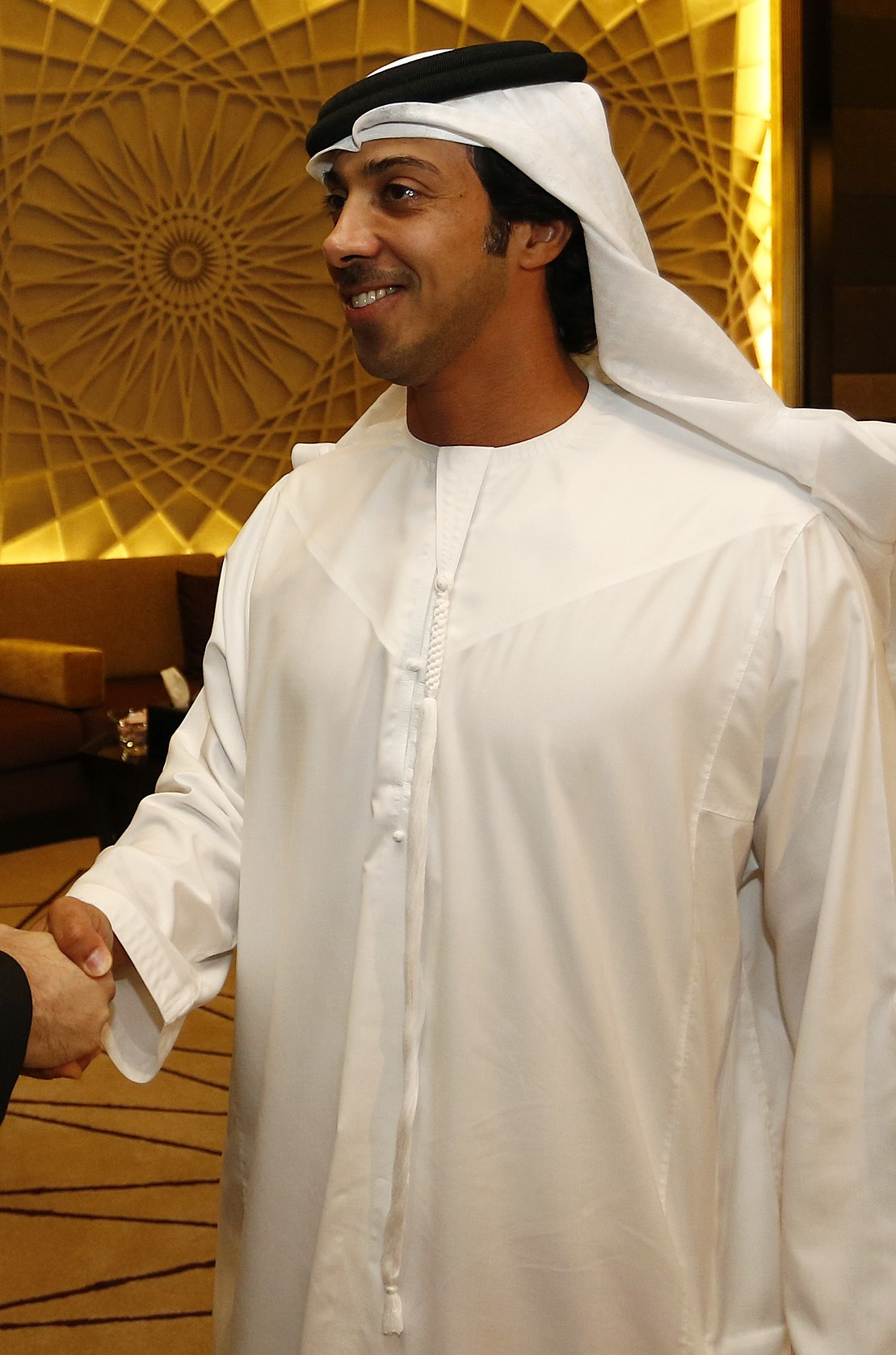
Mansour bin Zayed Al Nahyan

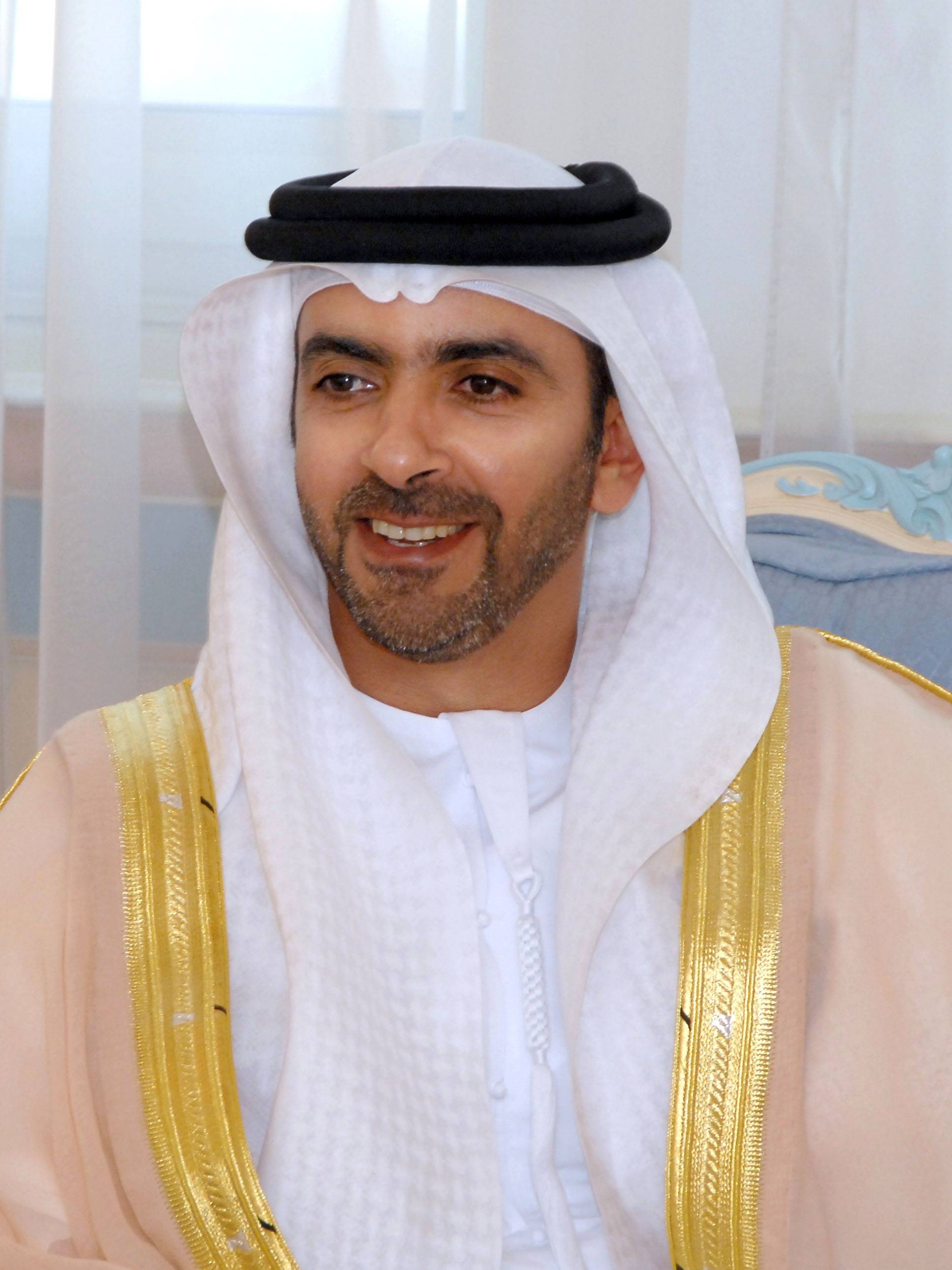
Saif bin Zayed Al Nahyan

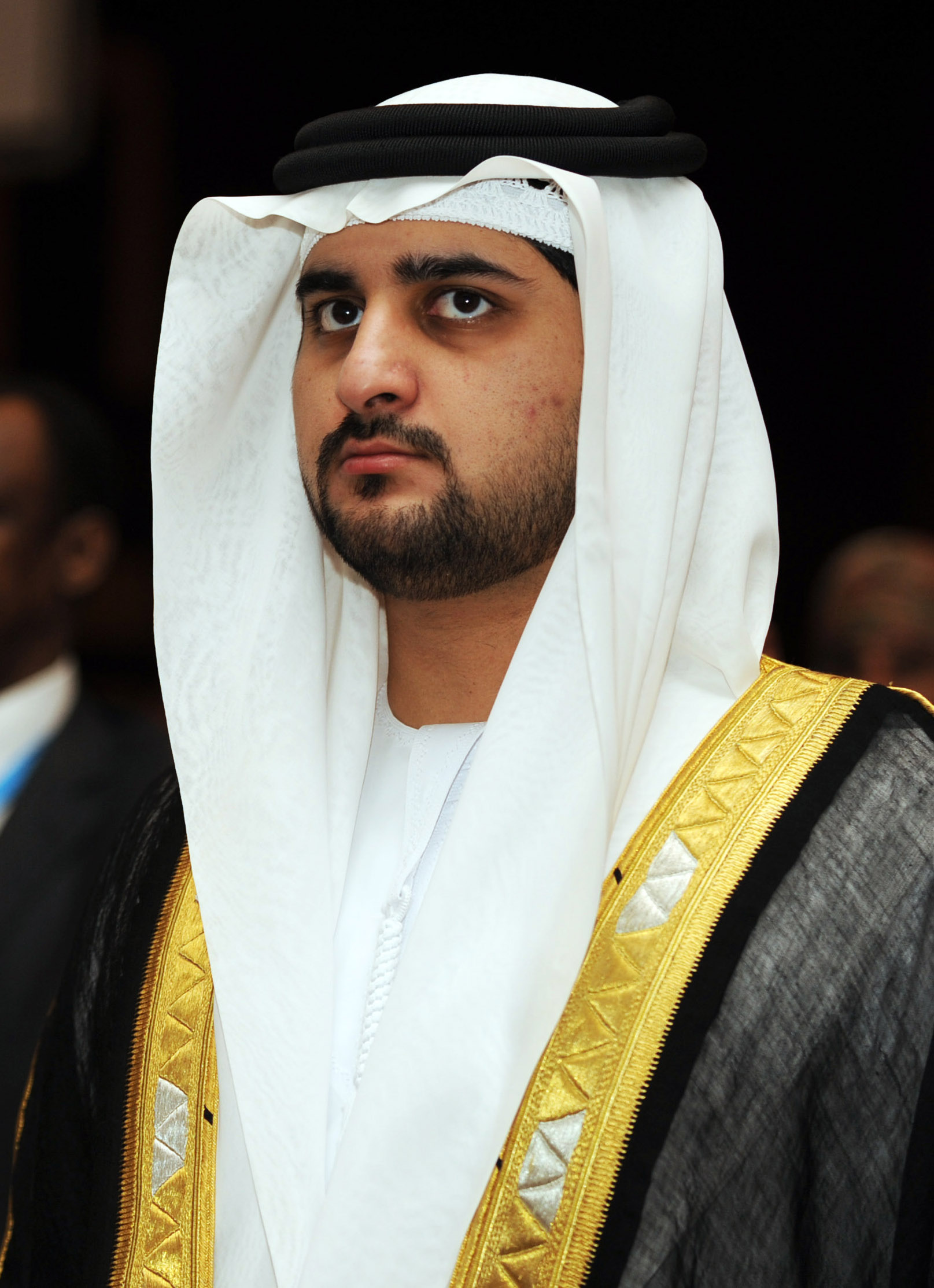
Maktoum bin Mohammed Al Maktoum
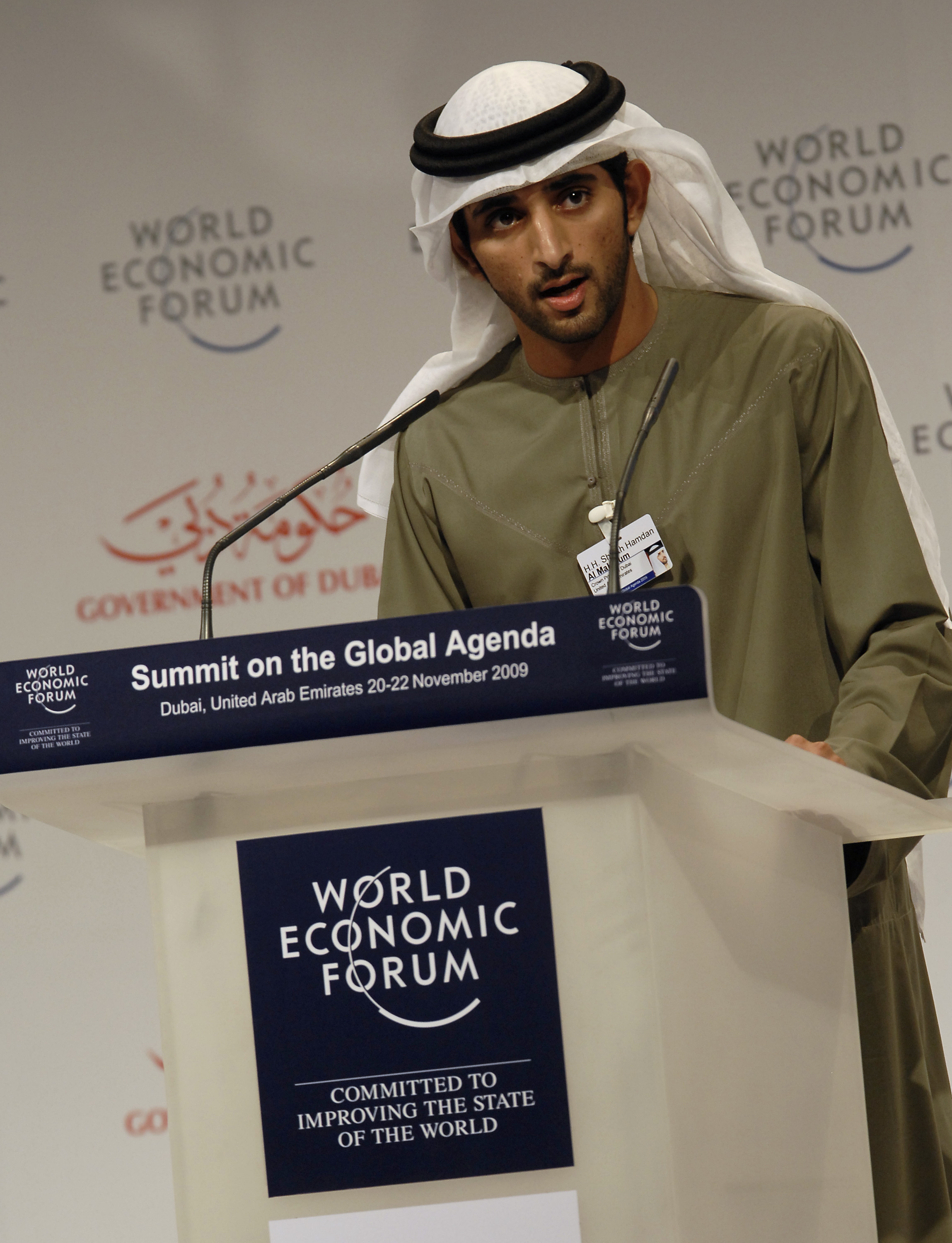
Hamdan bin Mohammed Al Maktoum

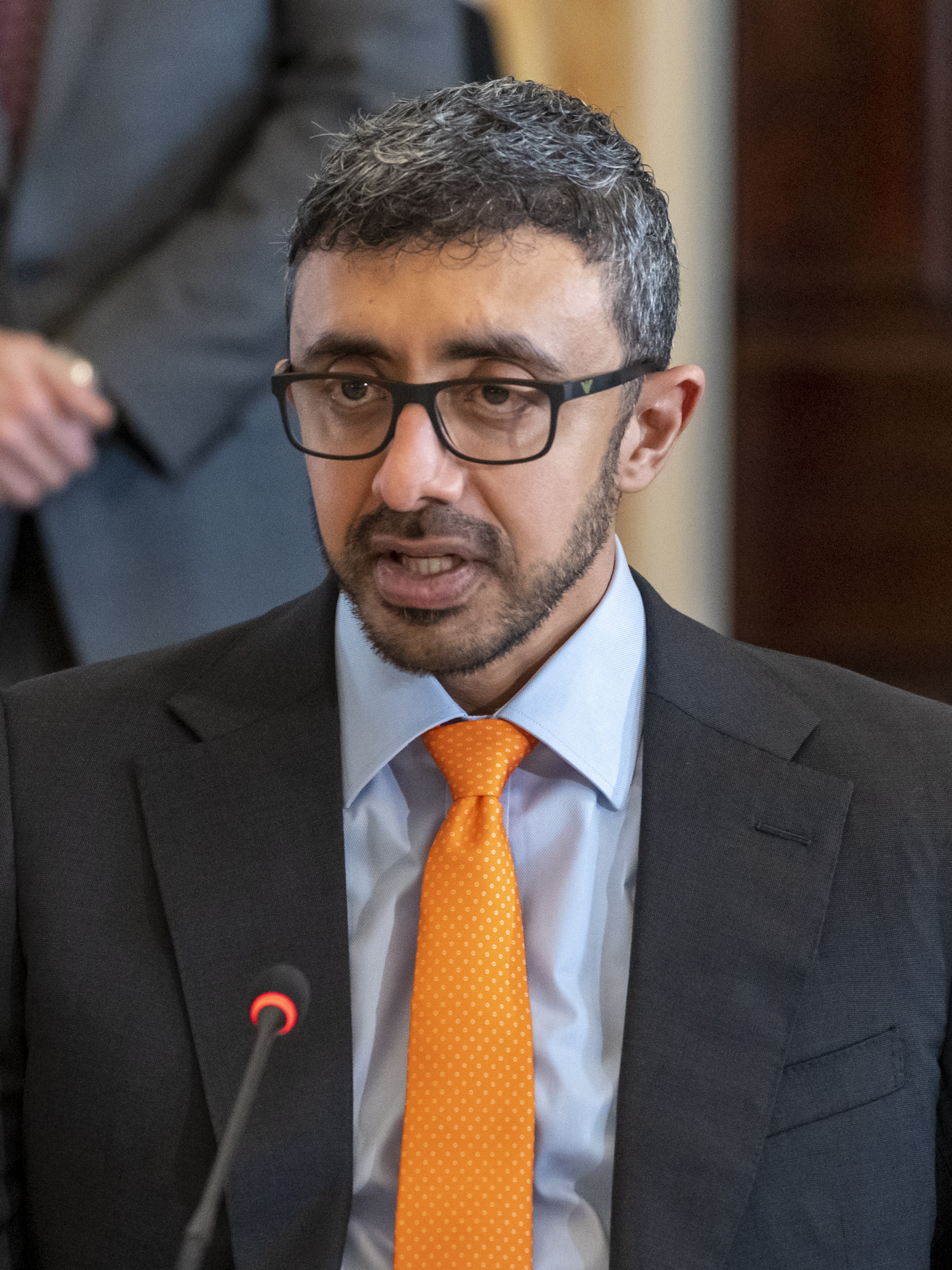
Abdullah bin Zayed Al Nahyan
Incumbent
Mansour bin Zayed Al Nahyan
since 10 May 2009
Saif bin Zayed Al Nahyan
since 10 May 2009
Maktoum bin Mohammed Al Maktoum
since 25 September 2021
Hamdan bin Mohammed Al Maktoum
since 14 July 2024
Abdullah bin Zayed Al Nahyan
since 14 July 2024
- Style: His Excellency, Sheikh
- Member of: Cabinet of the United Arab Emirates
- Reports to: Prime Minister
- Appointer: President of the United Arab Emirates
- Inaugural holder: Hamdan bin Rashid Al Maktoum
- Formation: 9 December 1971

The deputy prime minister of the United Arab Emirates is the deputy of the head of government of the federal government of the United Arab Emirates.

The first deputy prime minister was Sheikh Hamdan bin Rashid Al Maktoum who took office on 9 December 1971. He left office on 23 December 1973 and was succeeded by Sheikh Khalifa bin Zayed Al Nahyan. All deputy prime ministers since Hamdan bin Mohammed Al Nahyan have served part of their term with at least one deputy. There are currently five deputy prime ministers of the UAE, Mansour bin Zayed Al Nahyan and Saif bin Zayed Al Nahyan, who both took office on 10 May 2009, Maktoum bin Mohammed Al Maktoum who took office on 25 September 2021, Abdullah bin Zayed Al Nahyan and Hamdan bin Mohammed Al Maktoum who both took office on 14 July 2024.

The deputy prime ministers are members of the Council of Ministers, which meets once a week in the capital, Abu Dhabi.

No.	Name (Birth–Death)	Term of office			Prime Minister(s)	Notes
No.	Name (Birth–Death)	Took office	Left office	Time in office	Prime Minister(s)	Notes
1	Hamdan bin Rashid Al Maktoum حمدان بن راشد آل مكتوم (1945–2021)	9 December 1971	23 December 1973	2 years, 14 days	Maktoum bin Rashid Al Maktoum	
2	Khalifa bin Zayed Al Nahyan خليفة بن زايد آل نهيان (1948–2022)	23 December 1973	20 December 1977	3 years, 362 days	Maktoum bin Rashid Al Maktoum	
3	Hamdan bin Mohammed Al Nahyan حمدان بن محمد آل نهيان (1943-1989)	20 December 1977	11 October 1989	11 years, 295 days	Maktoum bin Rashid Al Maktoum (until 30 April 1979); Rashid bin Saeed Al Maktoum	
4	Maktoum bin Rashid Al Maktoum مكتوم بن راشد آل مكتوم (1949–2006)	30 April 1979	7 October 1990	11 years, 160 days	Rashid bin Saeed Al Maktoum	
5	Sultan bin Zayed Al Nahyan حمدان بن محمد آل نهيان (1955-2019)	7 October 1990	10 May 2009	18 years, 215 days	Maktoum bin Rashid Al Maktoum (until 4 January 2006); Vacant (4 January 2006 - 10 February 2006); Mohammed bin Rashid Al Maktoum	
6	Hamdan bin Zayed Al Nahyan حمدان بن زايد آل نهيان (1963-)	25 March 1997	10 May 2009	12 years, 46 days	Maktoum bin Rashid Al Maktoum (until 4 January 2006); Vacant (4 January 2006 - 10 February 2006); Mohammed bin Rashid Al Maktoum	
7	Mansour bin Zayed Al Nahyan منصور بن زايد آل نهيان (1970-)	10 May 2009	Incumbent	17 years, 159 days	Mohammed bin Rashid Al Maktoum	
8	Saif bin Zayed Al Nahyan سيف بن زايد آل نهيان (1968-)	10 May 2009	Incumbent	17 years, 159 days	Mohammed bin Rashid Al Maktoum	
9	Maktoum bin Mohammed Al Maktoum مكتوم بن محمد آل مكتوم (1983-)	25 September 2021	Incumbent	5 years, 21 days	Mohammed bin Rashid Al Maktoum	
10	Hamdan bin Mohammed Al Maktoum حمدان بن محمد آل مكتوم (1982-)	14 July 2024	Incumbent	2 years, 94 days	Mohammed bin Rashid Al Maktoum	
11	Abdullah bin Zayed Al Nahyan عبد الله بن زايد آل نهيان (1972-)	14 July 2024	Incumbent	2 years, 94 days	Mohammed bin Rashid Al Maktoum	

== See also ==
- President of the United Arab Emirates
- Prime Minister of the United Arab Emirates
- Cabinet of the United Arab Emirates
