= Noura Al Kaabi =

Emirati business woman

Her Excellency Noura Al Kaabi
- نورة بنت محمد الكعبي
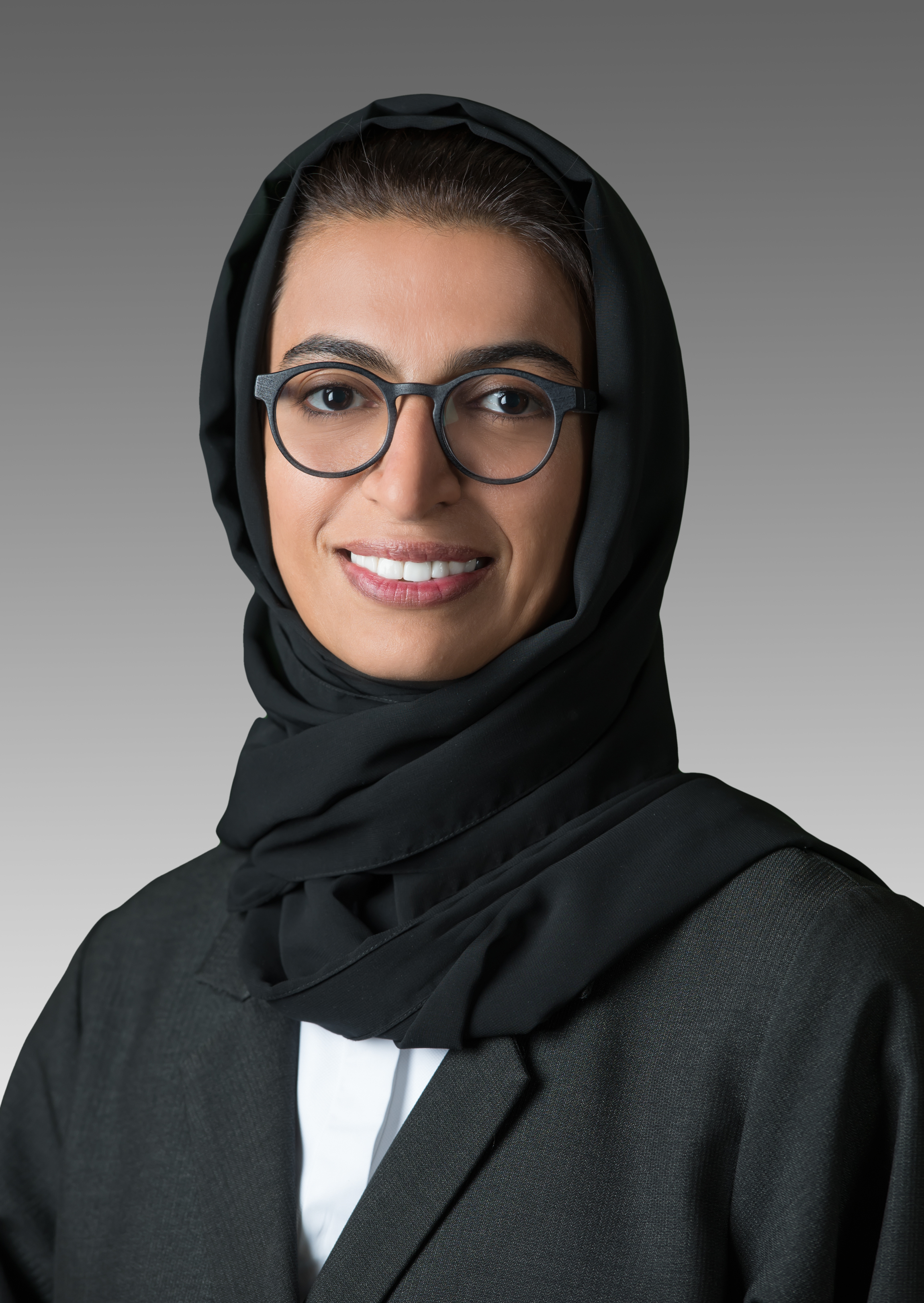

Minister of State at Ministry of Foreign Affairs
- Incumbent
- Assumed office 7 February 2023
- President: Mohammed bin Zayed Al Nahyan
- Prime Minister: Mohammed bin Rashid Al Maktoum

Minister of Culture and Youth
- In office 5 July 2020 – 7 February 2023
- President: Khalifa bin Zayed Al Nahyan; Mohamed bin Zayed Al Nahyan
- Prime Minister: Mohammed bin Rashid Al Maktoum
- Preceded by: Office established
- Succeeded by: Salem bin Khalid Al Qassimi

Minister of Culture and Knowledge Development
- In office 20 October 2017 – 4 July 2020
- President: Khalifa bin Zayed Al Nahyan
- Prime Minister: Mohammed bin Rashid Al Maktoum
- Preceded by: Nahyan bin Mubarak Al Nahyan
- Succeeded by: Office abolished

Minister of State for Federal National Council Affairs
- In office 10 February 2016 – 19 October 2017
- President: Khalifa bin Zayed Al Nahyan
- Prime Minister: Mohammed bin Rashid Al Maktoum
- Preceded by: Anwar Gargash
- Succeeded by: Abdul Rahman Mohammed Al Owais

Personal details
- Education: United Arab Emirates University (BA)

Her Excellency Noura bint Mohammed Al Kaabi (Arabic: نورة بنت محمد الكعبي) is an Emirati politician and businesswoman currently serving as Minister of State at the UAE Ministry of Foreign Affairs. She previously served as Minister of Culture and Youth from 2020 to 2023 for the United Arab Emirates. She has held the position since October 2017. Previously, she was the Minister of State for Federal National Council Affairs from February 2016 to October 2017. She has also been the chairperson of the twofour54 since 2012 and Abu Dhabi Media since 2017.

== Education ==
Al Kaabi received her high school education in Abu Dhabi and Pennsylvania. She received a Bachelor of Arts in management information systems from the United Arab Emirates University in 2001. In 2011, she completed the Executive Leadership Programme from the London Business School.

== Career ==
Al Kaabi served in a management position in Dolphin Energy before joining twofour54 in October 2007. There she worked as head of human development from 2011, before becoming CEO in February 2012.

Al Kaabi was appointed to the Federal National Council (FNC) from Abu Dhabi in November 2011 and re-appointed in November 2015. On 10 February 2016, she was appointed Minister of State for Federal National Council Affairs in the Cabinet of the United Arab Emirates (UAE Cabinet). As Minister of State for Federal National Council Affairs, she acted as facilitator between the cabinet and the FNC. In June 2016, Al Kaabi was appointed chairwoman of the Abu Dhabi National Exhibitions Company and on 12 April 2017 chairwoman of Abu Dhabi Media. She was appointed Minister for Culture and Knowledge Development in the UAE Cabinet on 19 October 2017.

As of March 2018, she is a board member of the UAE National Media Council, Image Nation, the Abu Dhabi Sports Council and the United Arab Emirates University.

On 5 July 2020, she was appointed the Minister of Culture and Youth following a restructuring of government portfolios.

In a February 2023 government reshuffle, Mohammed bin Rashid Al Maktoum announced Al Kaabi as Minister of State at the UAE Ministry of Foreign Affairs.

== Recognition ==
In 2011 and again in 2012, Al Kaabi was named by Arabian Business as one of the "100 Most Powerful Arab Women". In 2013, she became the first Emirati to be ranked among Foreign Policy Magazine's Top 100 Global Thinkers. The same year, she was named by Le Nouvel Observateur as one of the "50 individuals who contribute to changing the world" and by Arabian Business as one of the "100 Most Powerful Arab Women." In 2014, Al Kaabi was named by Forbes Middle East as one of the 30 Most Influential Women in Government. She was awarded "Business Woman of the Year" at the Gulf Business Awards and received the “Young Achiever Award” at the AmCham, Abu Dhabi’s Annual Excellence Awards. She has been a young global leader at the World Economic Forum since 2014. In 2015, LinkedIn named Al Kaabi as a global influencer, and she became the first woman from MENA to enter LinkedIn's Global Influencer Program. The same year, she was honoured by America Abroad Media. She was also named one of the 25 most powerful women in global television by The Hollywood Reporter.

In December 2020, Moon Jae-in, President of South Korea, presented Al Kaabi with the "Diplomatic Service Medal" in recognition of her efforts to enhance the relations between the UAE and South Korea.
