= First Government of the United Arab Emirates =

Emirati government between December 1971 and 1973

First Government of United Arab Emirates
- Cabinet of the United Arab Emirates
- Date formed: 9 December 1971
- Date dissolved: 23 December 1973

People and organisations
- Head of state: Zayed bin Sultan Al Nahyan
- Head of government: Maktoum bin Rashid Al Maktoum
- Deputy head of government: Hamdan bin Rashid Al Maktoum
- No. of ministers: 19

History
- Predecessor: Office established
- Successor: Second Government of the United Arab Emirates

On 2 December 1971, the United Arab Emirates was established as a federal independent country with the participation of the following emirates: Abu Dhabi, Dubai, Sharjah, Ajman, Fujairah and Umm Al Quwain. Zayed bin Sultan Al Nahyan became the president and Rashid bin Saeed Al Maktoum the vice president. On the same day Maktoum bin Rashid Al Maktoum was given the task of forming the government. The cabinet was announced on 9 December.

The term of the cabinet ended on 23 December 1973 when Maktoum bin Rashid Al Maktoum formed the second cabinet.

== List of cabinet members ==
The first cabinet of the United Arab Emirates consisted of the following members:

Office	Incumbent
Prime Minister	Maktoum bin Rashid Al Maktoum
Deputy Prime Minister	Hamdan bin Rashid Al Maktoum
Minister of Interior	Mubarak bin Mohammed Al Nahyan
Minister of Finance, Economy and Industry	Hamdan bin Rashid Al Maktoum
Minister of Defense	Mohammed bin Rashid Al Maktoum
Minister of Foreign Affairs	Ahmad Khalifah Al Suwaidi
Minister of Health	Sultan bin Ahmad Al Mualla
Minister of Public Works	Mohammed bin Sultan Al Qasim
Minister of Education	Sultan bin Mohammed Al Qasimi
Minister of Economy	Ahmad bin Sultan Sulayyim
Minister of Communications	Abdulaziz Al Nuaimi
Minister of Agriculture and Fisheries	Hamad bin Mohammed Al Sharqi
Minister of Information	Ahmad bin Ijami
Minister of Justice	Abdullah bin Imran Taryam
Minister of Federation, Gulf Affairs and Electricity	Mohammed Saeed Al Mulla
Minister of Planning and Housing	Mohammed Al Kindi
Minister of State (Supreme Council Affairs)	Mohammed Al Suwaidi
Minister of State (Council of Ministers Affairs)	Utaybah bin Abdullah Al Utaybah
Minister of Youth and Sport	Rashid bin Humaid
Minister of Labor Affairs	Sami bin Isa bin Harb
