= Anwar Gargash Diplomatic Academy =

Foreign service institute in Abu Dhabi, United Arab Emirates

Anwar Gargash Diplomatic Institute
- أكاديمية أنور قرقاش الدبلوماسية
- Former names: Emirates Diplomatic Academy (2014–2021)
- Established: 19 August 2014; 11 years ago
- Founders: Mohammed bin Rashid Al Maktoum
- Accreditation: Commission for Academic Accreditation
- Chairman: Abdullah bin Zayed Al Nahyan
- Location: Abu Dhabi, United Arab Emirates; 24.42396°N 54.43352°E
- Website: agda.ac.ae

Anwar Gargash Diplomatic Academy (AGDA) (Arabic: أكاديمية أنور قرقاش الدبلوماسية), formerly the Emirates Diplomatic Academy (EDA) (Arabic: أكاديمية الإمارات الدبلوماسية), is an autonomous federal diplomatic research and civil service training institute in Abu Dhabi, United Arab Emirates. Founded in 2014 by the country's Vice President and Prime Minister Sheikh Mohammed bin Rashid al-Maktoum, it serves members of the UAE's foreign service community and prepares Emirati diplomats as well as other professionals to advance the country's foreign affairs interests overseas.

It was renamed in honor of Anwar Mohammed Gargash in 2021 by Sheikh Mohammed bin Zayed al-Nahyan following the end of his 13-year tenure as the United Arab Emirate's Minister of State for Foreign Affairs.

== History ==
The Emirates Diplomatic Academy was established pursuant to Cabinet Decree No. 29 issued by Sheikh Mohammed bin Rashid al-Maktoum, Vice President and Prime Minister of the United Arab Emirates on August 19, 2014. The institute opened its door to students in September 2015, and graduated its first batch of students in 2016.

In February 2021, Sheikh Mohammed bin Zayed al-Nahyan renamed the Emirates Diplomatic Academy to Anwar Gargash Diplomatic Academy, immediately following the end of his tenure as the country's Minister of State for Foreign Affairs. The renaming was done in recognition of his services to the country's foreign policy.

In July 2021, Anwar Gargash announced the partnership between the academy and Johns Hopkins University School of Advanced International Studies.

In February 2023, the institute signed a memorandum of understanding with India's O.P. Jindal Global University to exchange knowledge, expertise and research cooperation as well as facilitate mutual training programme.
