= Emirates Soil Museum =

Museum for soil and water science in Dubai

Coordinates: 25.09458°N 55.39020°E

The Emirates Soil Museum opened on 8 December 2016, with the support of the Abu Dhabi Fund for Development in improving the technology and interior and exterior exhibits. Since its launch, the museum has had 3,000 visitors from various backgrounds. The museum attempts to engage its visitors through knowledge dissemination, workshops, and student field trips that involved them stepping out into nature and collecting data on soil, water and soil biodiversity as well as hands-on activities, science experiments, analysis and projects.

The recommendation was made after the completion of the first phase of the UAE Soil Mapping Project which was a 10-year project that included extensive and intensive soil analysis completed in collaboration with EAD and the UAE Ministry of Climate Change and Environment (Ministry of Environment and Water at the time). This project produced the UAE Soil Maps, Abu Dhabi Soil Survey Books, Northern Emirates Soil Survey Books, United Arab Emirates Keys to Soil Taxonomy and the addition of a new soil sub group called Anhydrite, which was officially recognized in 2014 in the updated edition of the US Keys to Soil Taxonomy.

== Funding ==
The museums founding donors include the Islamic Development Bank (IsDB), UAE Ministry of Climate Change and Environment, Environment Agency – Abu Dhabi (EAD), Abu Dhabi Fund for Development, ICBA.

The museum is currently supported by the UAE Ministry of Food Security, IsDB and ICBA.

== Education program ==
The museum offers field trips for primary school, middle school and high school students. The museum also organizes events and hosts university students, corporates and members of the general public in similarly immersive experiences.

== Most important events ==
The museum holds a number of events, the most important of which are:

- Winter and spring camps for sustainability
- International Day for Biological Diversity
- World Soil Day
- World Environment Day

== See also ==
- Soil classification
- Aridisols
- Entisols
