= UAE Government Annual Meetings =

The UAE Government Annual Meetings are annual government meetings held under the patronage of the UAE Cabinet, chaired by the Vice President and Prime Minister of the UAE. The meetings take place over two consecutive days in the capital, Abu Dhabi, and are attended by representatives of all government entities at the federal and local levels. Launched in 2017, these meetings aim to establish a strategic national platform that brings together all government parties within a unified and regular framework to discuss key development issues and develop future visions and plans that serve the country's long-term sustainable development goals, most notably the UAE Centennial 2071. They also assess progress in implementing national strategies, such as UAE Vision 2021, the "We the UAE 2031" initiative, Emiratisation plans, digital transformation, artificial intelligence, and sustainable development.

== Sessions ==
The sessions began in 2017 and included the launch of initiatives such as the AED 500 million Mars Science City project. And in 2018, the Emirates Water and Electricity Company (EWEC) was established.

The annual meetings were not held in 2020 and 2021 due to the exceptional circumstances associated with the COVID-19 pandemic. The 2023 session then focused on following up on the final preparations for hosting the World Climate Conference. The 2024 session presented a polar scientific research project, under which the UAE will join the leading countries in polar research; the entrepreneurship ecosystem and the "Riyada" Fund to support innovation and startups; and a package of major community initiatives worth approximately AED 500 million.
