= Cabinet of the United Arab Emirates =

Cabinet in the United Arab Emirates

- مجلس الوزراء
- Formation: 9 December 1971 (54 years ago)
- Headquarters: Abu Dhabi, United Arab Emirates
- Prime Minister: Mohammed Bin Rashid Al Maktoum
- Membership: 1 prime minister; 5 deputy prime ministers; 29 general ministers; A general secretariat composed of a varying number of employees
- Main organ: Federal government of the United Arab Emirates
- Website: uaecabinet.ae

The Cabinet of the United Arab Emirates, or Council of Ministers (Arabic: مجلس الوزراء), is the chief executive body of the United Arab Emirates (UAE) federal government. The cabinet consists of federal government ministers and is led by the prime minister of the United Arab Emirates. Although not stated in the Constitution of the United Arab Emirates, the practice is that the position of prime minister is held by the ruler of Dubai. The cabinet reports to the president of the United Arab Emirates and the Federal Supreme Council.

== History ==
The first cabinet was formed following the union of the UAE as a federation on 9 December 1971. The last reshuffle was on 6 January 2024.

== Jurisdiction ==
The cabinet runs and represents the federal government of the United Arab Emirates, and jurisdiction varies among the emirates of the United Arab Emirates, with some emirates, such as the government of Dubai, retaining broad jurisdiction over legislative, judicial, and security affairs. The main jurisdiction of the cabinet lies with standardising laws and coordination between the various emirates, in addition to exclusive jurisdiction over defence and foreign affairs, among others.

== Current Cabinet ==
Office	Incumbent	Website
Vice President; Prime Minister	Mohammed bin Rashid Al Maktoum	pm.gov.ae mod.gov.ae
Vice President; Deputy Prime Minister; Minister of Presidential Court	Mansour bin Zayed Al Nahyan	diwan.gov.ae
Deputy Prime Minister; Minister of Interior	Saif bin Zayed Al Nahyan	moi.gov.ae
Deputy Prime Minister; Minister of Finance	Maktoum bin Mohammed Al Maktoum	mof.gov.ae
Deputy Prime Minister; Minister of Defence	Hamdan bin Mohammed Al Maktoum	mod.gov.ae
Deputy Prime Minister; Minister of Foreign Affairs	Abdullah bin Zayed Al Nahyan	mofa.gov.ae
Minister of Health and Prevention; Minister of Federal National Council Affairs	Ahmed bin Ali Al Sayegh	
Ministry of Economy & Tourism	Abdulla Al Marri	moec.gov.ae
Minister of Justice	Abdullah Al Nuaimi	moj.gov.ae
Minister of Energy and Infrastructure	Suhail Al Mazroui	moei.gov.ae
Minister of Education	Sarah Amiri	moe.gov.ae
Minister of Tolerance and Coexistence	Nahyan bin Mubarak Al Nahyan	tolerance.gov.ae
Minister of Culture and Youth	Salem bin Khalid Al Qassimi	mcy.gov.ae
Minister of Climate Change and Environment	Amna Al Dahak Al Shamsi	moccae.gov.ae
Minister of Industry and Advanced Technology	Sultan Ahmed Al Jaber	moiat.gov.ae
Minister of Human Resources and Emiratisation	Abdulrahman Al Awar	mohre.gov.ae
Minister of Community Development	Shamma Al Mazrui	mocd.gov.ae
Minister of Federal Supreme Council Affairs	Abdullah Al Ketbi	uaecabinet.ae
Minister of Cabinet Affairs	Mohammed Al Gergawi	uaecabinet.ae
Minister of State for International Cooperation	Reem Bint Ibrahim Al Hashimy	mofa.gov.ae
Minister of State for Defence Affairs	Mohammed Fadel Al Mazrouei	mod.gov.ae
Minister of State for Government Development and the Future	Ohoud Al Roumi	moca.gov.ae
Minister of State for Public Education and Advanced Technology	Sarah bint Yousif Al Amiri	moiat.gov.ae moe.gov.ae
Minister of State for Artificial Intelligence, Digital Economy and Remote Work Applications	Omar Bin Sultan Al Olama	ai.gov.ae
Minister of State for Foreign Trade	Thani Ahmed Al Zeyoudi	moec.gov.ae
Minister of State for Early Education	Sara Musallam	moe.gov.ae
Minister of State for Financial Affairs	Mohamed Hadi Al Hussaini	mof.gov.ae
Minister of State for Youth Affairs	Sultan Al Neyadi	
Minister of State at Ministry of Foreign Affairs	Noura Al Kaabi	
Minister of State	Shakhboot bin Nahyan Al Nahyan	
Minister of State	Hamad Al Shamsi	
Minister of State	Khalifa Al Marar	
Minister of State	Maryam Al Hammadi	
Minister of State	Jaber Al Suwaidi	

== See also ==
- UAE Government Annual Meetings
