= Ministry of Finance (United Arab Emirates) =

Government ministry of the United Arab Emirates

- وزارة المالية
- Logo of the UAE Ministry of Finance

Ministry overview
- Formed: 9 December 1971; 54 years ago
- Jurisdiction: Federal government of the United Arab Emirates
- Headquarters: Abu Dhabi and Dubai; 24.485455°N 54.377389°E
- Ministers responsible: Maktoum bin Mohammed Al Maktoum, Minister of Finance; Mohamed bin Hadi Al Hussaini, Minister of State for Financial Affairs
- Child Ministry: Capital Market Authority
- Website: mof.gov.ae

The Ministry of Finance (MoF) (Arabic: وزارة المالية) is the ministry of the federal government of United Arab Emirates which is responsible for public finances. The ministry's objective is to promote fiscal planning and fiscal sustainability of the federal government of the United Arab Emirates. The ministry is located in Abu Dhabi and Dubai.

== Ministers ==
Name	Took office	Left office	Notes
Hamdan bin Rashid Al Maktoum	9 December 1971	24 March 2021	Died in office
Obaid Humaid al Tayer	24 March 2021	25 September 2021	acting
Maktoum bin Mohammed Al Maktoum	25 September 2021	Incumbent	

== See also ==
- Cabinet of the United Arab Emirates
- Economy of United Arab Emirates
- Central Bank of the United Arab Emirates
