= Hamdan bin Zayed bin Sultan Al Nahyan =

Emirati politician (born 1963)

His Highness Sheikh Hamdan bin Zayed Al Nahyan
- حمدان بن زايد آل نهيان
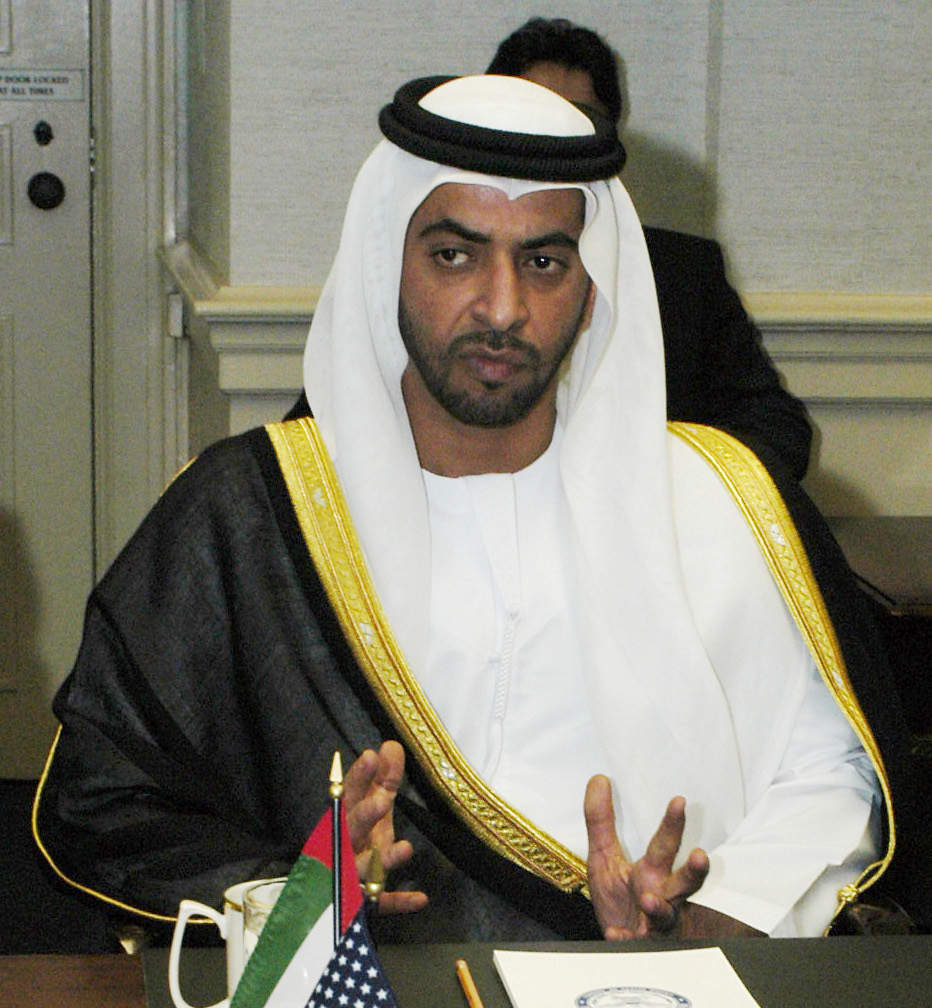
- Sheikh Hamdan in 2011

Ruler’s Representative in Al Dhafra Region
- Incumbent
- Assumed office 13 June 2009

Deputy Prime Minister of the United Arab Emirates
- In office 25 March 1997 – 4 March 2009 Serving with Sultan bin Zayed Al Nahyan
- President: Zayed bin Sultan Al Nahyan (1997–2004); Khalifa bin Zayed Al Nahyan (2004–09)
- Prime Minister: Maktoum bin Rashid Al Maktoum (1997–2006); Mohammed bin Rashid Al Maktoum (2006–09)
- Preceded by: Sultan bin Zayed Al Nahyan
- Succeeded by: Saif bin Zayed Al Nahyan; Mansour bin Zayed Al Nahyan

Minister of State for Foreign Affairs
- In office 1990–2006
- President: Zayed bin Sultan Al Nahyan (1990–2004); Khalifa bin Zayed Al Nahyan (2004–06)
- Prime Minister: Maktoum bin Rashid Al Maktoum
- Preceded by: Rashid Abdullah
- Succeeded by: Mohammed Hussein Al Shaali

Personal details
- Born: 19 February 1963 (age 63) Al Ain, Abu Dhabi, Trucial States
- Spouse: Shamsa bint Hamdan Al Nahyan
- Parents: Zayed bin Sultan Al Nahyan (father); Fatima bint Mubarak Al Ketbi (mother)
- House: Al Nahyan

Styles of Sheikh Hamdan bin Zayed bin Sultan Al Nahyan
- Reference style: His Highness
- Spoken style: Your Highness

Sheikh Hamdan bin Zayed bin Sultan Al Nahyan (Arabic: حمدان بن زايد بن سلطان آل نهيان; born 19 February 1963) is an Emirati politician and member of the Abu Dhabi ruling family. He is the ruler's representative in Al Dhafrah region of Abu Dhabi. Sheikh Hamdan is a son of the late Zayed bin Sultan Al Nahyan, President of the United Arab Emirates and Sheikh of Abu Dhabi. Hamdan is the younger brother of both former UAE president Khalifa bin Zayed and the current president, Mohamed bin Zayed.

== Early life and education ==
Sheikh Hamdan was born in Al Ain in 1963. He is the 4th son of the founder of United Arab Emirates, the late president Sheikh Zayed bin Sultan Al Nahyan, who also served as the emir of Abu Dhabi. His mother is Sheikha Fatima bint Mubarak Al Ketbi and he has five full-brothers: Mohamed, Hazza, Tahnoun, Mansour, and Abdullah. They are known as Bani Fatima or sons of Fatima. In addition, he is the younger paternal half-brother of the former emir and UAE president Khalifa bin Zayed Al Nahyan.

He has a bachelor's degree in political sciences and business administration, both from the United Arab Emirates University.

== Career ==
Along with his half-brother Sheikh Sultan bin Zayed Al Nahyan, he served as Deputy Prime Minister of the United Arab Emirates in the cabinet led by the prime minister Mohammed bin Rashid Al Maktoum, who is the emir of Dubai. He serves as Chairman of state-owned gas company Dolphin Energy and Environment Agency – Abu Dhabi.

== Sports ==
He was the Chairman of the UAE Football Association (1984–1993). In 2019, he opened the new ERC headquarters at Zayed Sports City in Abu Dhabi.

=== Banning of child camel jockeys ===
During 2002, he announced the ban of employing children as camel jockeys.

=== Post ===
- United Arab Emirates
  - Cabinet of UAE (1990–2009)
  - Chairman of the Emirati German Friendship Society
  - Chairman of the Red Crescent Authority
  - Chairman of the Emirates Camel Racing Federation
  - ex-President of UAE Football League
- Abu Dhabi
  - President of Abu Dhabi University Board of Trustees
  - Ruler's Representative in the Western Region (since 2009)
  - The Honorary Chairmanship of Al-Jazira Club and Chairman of the Honorary Panel.

== Personal life ==
Sheikh Hamdan was married to Sheikha Ayesha bint Suhail Al Ketbi (divorced later) with whom he has two sons:

- Sheikh Sultan bin Hamdan bin Zayed Al Nahyan. Married Sheikha Shamma bint Khalifa bin Zayed Al Nahyan with whom he has 3 sons.
- Sheikh Mohammed bin Hamdan Al Nahyan, married Sheikha Latifa bint Tahnoun bin Mohammed Al Nahyan. They have one son and a daughter together.

Hamdan bin Zayed married Sheikha Shamsa bint Hamdan bin Mohammed Al Nahyan in 1988. They have seven children:

- Sheikha Fatima bint Hamdan Al Nahyan. Married Sheikh Shakbout bin Nahyan bin Mubarak Al Nahyan. They have one son and a daughter together.
- Sheikh Zayed bin Hamdan Al Nahyan (born 4 April 1990). Married Sheikha Shamma, daughter of Mohammed bin Zayed Al Nahyan. The couple has one son, Sheikh Hamdan bin Zayed bin Hamdan Al Nahyan.
- Sheikha Latifa bint Hamdan Al Nahyan. Married Sheikh Theyab, son of Mohammed bin Zayed Al Nahyan. The couple has one son and two daughters.
- Sheikha Salama bint Hamdan Al Nahyan. Married Sheikh Khalifa bin Tahnoun bin Mohammed Al Nahyan. The couple has two sons and a daughter together.
- Sheikh Hazza bin Hamdan Al Nahyan, married Sheikha Maryam bint Saeed bin Zayed Al Nahyan in 2022. They have one son together.
- Sheikh Yas bin Hamdan Al Nahyan (born 12 June 1998)
- Sheikh Rashid bin Hamdan Al Nahyan (born 6 August 2005).

His father-in-law, Sheikh Hamdan bin Mohammed Al Nahyan, was a distant cousin of the founder of UAE, Sheikh Zayed bin Sultan Al Nahyan.

== Honours ==
- First Class Medal of the Order of Abu Bakar Siddiq of the International Red Cross and Red Crescent Movement (2001).
- Gold Medal of the Iraqi Red Crescent Society (2003).
- Hilal-e-Pakistan (March 2008).
- Germany – Grand Cross of the Order of Merit of the Federal Republic of Germany (14 December 2008).
