= Saeed bin Zayed Al Nahyan =

Emirati politician (1965–2023)

- Born: Saeed bin Zayed Al Nahyan; 1965; Al Ain, Trucial States
- Died: 27 July 2023 (aged 57–58)
- Spouse: Shaikha bint Hamdan bin Mohammed Al Nahyan
- Issue: Sheikh Zayed; Sheikh Hamdan; Sheikha Salama; Sheikha Maryam
- Father: Zayed bin Sultan Al Nahyan
- Mother: Ayesha bint Ali Al Darmaki
- Occupation: Abu Dhabi Ruler's Representative

Styles of Sheikh Saeed bin Zayed bin Sultan Al Nahyan
- Reference style: His Highness
- Spoken style: Your Highness

Saeed bin Zayed Al Nahyan (Arabic: سعيد بن زايد بن سلطان آل نهيان; 1965 – 27 July 2023) was an Emirati politician, Abu Dhabi's ruler's representative, and member of Al Nahyan family of Abu Dhabi. He held the position of chairman of the Maritime Port Authority (Abu Dhabi). He was a member of the Abu Dhabi Executive Council.

== Biography ==
Saeed bin Zayed Al Nahyan was the son of Zayed bin Sultan Al Nahyan, the founder and first president of the United Arab Emirates. He was the half-brother of the President of the United Arab Emirates, Mohamed bin Zayed Al Nahyan.

Al Nahyan was the chairman of Abu Dhabi's Seaports Department and had held the position of undersecretary at the Abu Dhabi Planning Department. He was a member of Abu Dhabi Executive Council between 2004 and 2010.

Al Nahyan died on 27 July 2023 after suffering from a prolonged illness.

== Football ==
Al Nahyan served as the chairman of the UAE Football Association (2001–2002). He succeeded his half-brother Sheikh Khalifa as the chairman of Al-Wahda Club before being replaced in 2011 by his full brother, Sheikh Diab bin Zayed Al Nahyan. His half brother Sheikh Mansour is the chairman of Al-Jazira Club and owner of Manchester City.

== Ancestry ==
Ancestors of Saeed bin Zayed Al Nahyan

16. Sheikh Khalifa bin Shakbut Al Nahyan
8. Sheikh Zayed bin Khalifa Al Nahyan
4. Sheikh Sultan bin Zayed Al Nahyan
2. Sheikh Zayed bin Sultan Al Nahyan
10. Sheikh Butti Al Qubaisi
5. Sheikha Salma bint Butti Al Qubaisi
1. Sheikh Saeed bin Zayed Al Nahyan
6. Sheikh Ali Al Darmaki
3. Sheikha Ayesha bint Ali Al Darmaki
