= Alia bint Khalifa Al Maktoum =

Widow of Maktoum bin Rashid Al Maktoum

Alia bint Khalifa bin Saeed Al Maktoum
- Sheikha
- Spouse: Maktoum bin Rashid Al Maktoum (m. 1971; died 2006)
- Issue: Hessa; Maitha; Saeed; Rashid; Lateefa
Names
- Sheikha Alia bint Khalifa bin Saeed bin Maktoum bin Hasher bin Maktoum bin Butti bin Suhail Al Maktoum
- House: Al Maktoum
- Father: Khalifa bin Saeed Al Maktoum
- Mother: Sana bint Mana Al Maktoum

Sheikha Alia bint Khalifa bin Saeed Al Maktoum is the widow of Sheikh Maktoum bin Rashid Al Maktoum. They were married from 12 March 1971 until his death in 2006.

Sheikha Alia, like other members of the Maktoum family, is involved in horse racing. In 2005, she purchased four horses. Her horse Eilean Ban won the EBF Fillies' Conditions Stakes on September 2, 2005, at the Newmarket Racecourse.
