= Hamdan bin Mohammed Al Nahyan =

Emirati politician

Sheikh Hamdan bin Mohammed Al Nahyan

Deputy Prime Minister of the United Arab Emirates
- In office 20 December 1977 – 11 October 1989 Serving with Maktoum bin Rashid Al Maktoum (1979–1989)
- President: Zayed bin Sultan Al Nahyan
- Prime Minister: Maktoum bin Rashid Al Maktoum (1977–79); Rashid bin Saeed Al Maktoum (1979–1989)
- Preceded by: Khalifa bin Zayed Al Nahyan
- Succeeded by: Sultan bin Zayed Al Nahyan

Minister of Public Works
- In office 23 December 1973 – 11 October 1989
- President: Zayed bin Sultan Al Nahyan
- Prime Minister: Maktoum bin Rashid Al Maktoum
- Preceded by: Mohammed bin Sultan Al Qasimi
- Succeeded by: Mohammed Khalifa Al Kindi

Personal details
- Born: 1933 Al Ain, Trucial States
- Died: 11 October 1989 Germany
- Spouse: Maryam bint Abdullah bin Sulayem Al Falasi

Hamdan bin Mohammed Al Nahyan (حمدان بن محمد آل نهيان) was an Emirati politician and distant cousin of the founder of UAE, the first President, Zayed bin Sultan Al Nahyan, who was also the emir of Abu Dhabi emirate.

Hamdan bin Mohammed Al Nahyan was born in the 1930s in Al Ain. He was the first chairman of Abu Dhabi's Public Works Department. He and his brothers, Mubarak, Tahnoun, Saif and Suroor were the major supporters of Zayed bin Sultan, and they all assumed leading posts. From 1977 to 1989 he was in office as the deputy prime minister (since 1979 sharing this post with the former Prime Minister Maktoum bin Rashid Al Maktoum).

He died in 1989 in a German hospital (presumably in Hannover / Niedersachsen, Germany).

== Children ==
Five children (one son and four daughters) of Sheikh Hamdan married Sheikh Zayed's children. Hamdan's daughter, Sheikha Shamsa bint Hamdan Al Nahyan is married to Sheikh Hamdan bin Zayed bin Sultan Al Nahyan, former deputy prime minister and ruler's representative in the western region of Abu Dhabi or the mayor of the region. Another daughter, Salama bint Hamdan, is the spouse of Hamdan bin Zayed's brother Mohamed bin Zayed Al Nahyan, President of the United Arab Emirates. Sheikha Sheikha was married to Saeed bin Zayed Al Nahyan. Maryam is married to Issa bin Zayed Al Nahyan.
