= Anwar Gargash =

Emirati politician (born 1959)

His Excellency Anwar Gargash
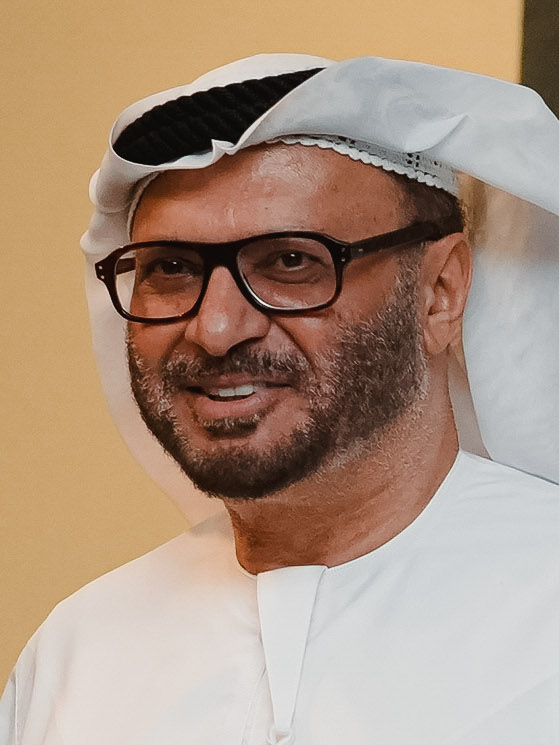
- Anwar Gargash in 2025

Minister of State for Foreign Affairs
- In office 17 February 2008 – 10 February 2021
- President: Khalifa bin Zayed Al Nahyan
- Prime Minister: Mohammed bin Rashid Al Maktoum
- Preceded by: Mohammed Hussein Al Shaali
- Succeeded by: Shakhbout bin Nahyan Al Nahyan

Minister of State for Federal National Council Affairs
- In office 2006 – 20 October 2017
- Preceded by: Office established
- Succeeded by: Office abolished

Personal details
- Born: 28 March 1959 (age 67) Dubai, Trucial States
- Education: George Washington University; King's College, Cambridge

Anwar Mohammed Gargash (Arabic: أنور محمد قرقاش; born 28 March 1959) is an Emirati politician who served as the minister of state for foreign affairs between February 2008 and February 2021. Since February 2021, he has been serving as a senior diplomatic advisor to the United Arab Emirates president.

== Education ==
Gargash received a bachelor's degree in 1981 and a master's degree in 1984 in political science from George Washington University. He then obtained a PhD from King's College of Cambridge University in 1990.

== Career ==
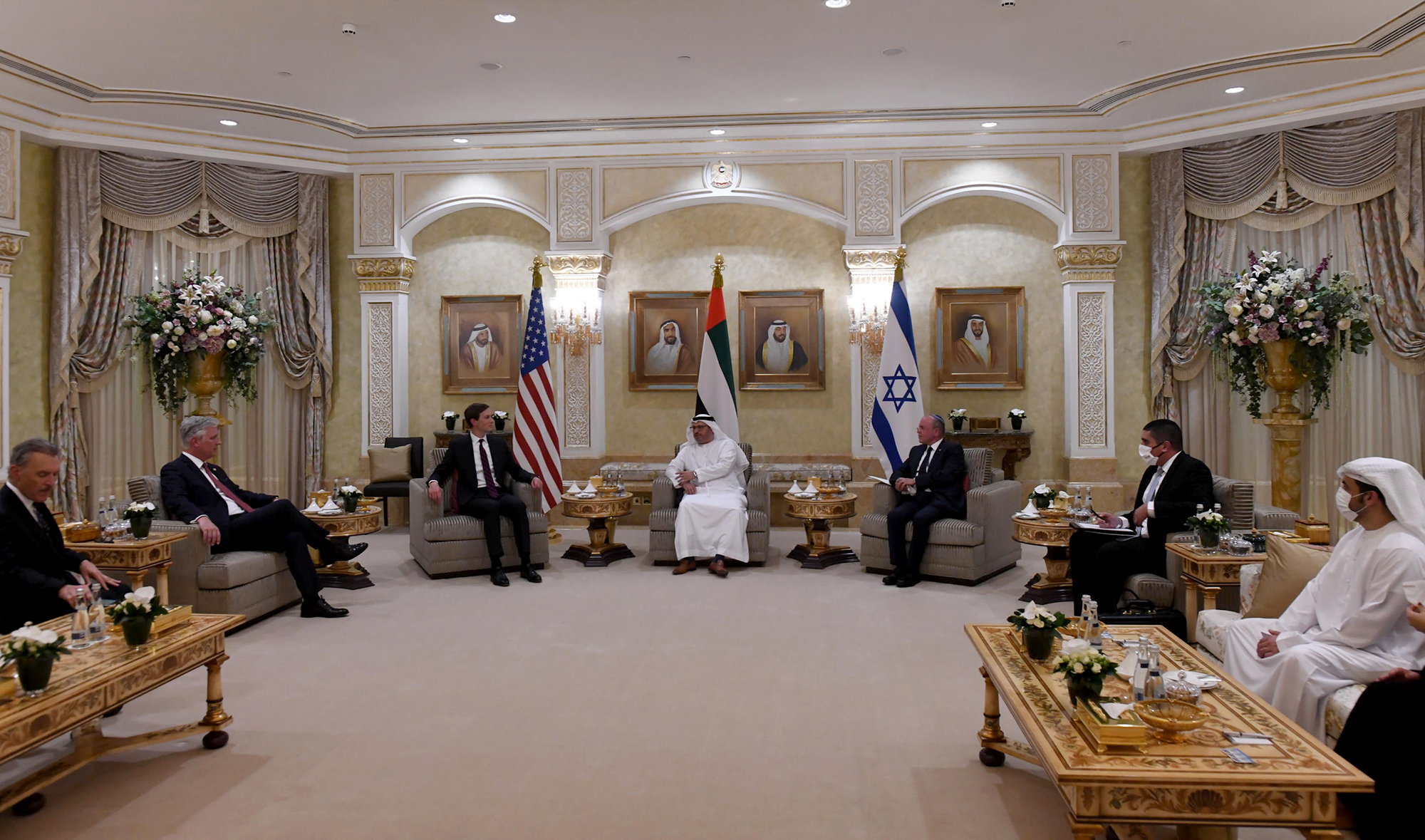
Gargash, Senior White House adviser Jared Kushner and head of Israel's National Security Council Meir Ben-Shabbat in Abu Dhabi on 31 August 2020

From 1995 to 1999, he worked as managing editor at the strategic studies publications of the Emirates Center for Strategic Studies and Research (ECSSR) and from 1995 to 2006 as chief executive officer of Gargash Enterprise. Between August 2006 and February 2007 Gargash was the chairman of the National Election Committee.

He was appointed minister of state for the federal national council in 2006. In February 2008, Gargash was appointed as minister of state for foreign affairs, and remained in that office until February 2021.

On 13 August 2020 Gargash announced the UAE's agreement to normalize relations with Israel stating that his country wanted to deal with the threats facing the two-state solution, specifically annexation of the Palestinian territories, and urging the Palestinians and Israelis to return to the negotiating table. Gargash's tenure ended on 10 February 2021 when Shakhbout bin Nahyan was appointed to the post. Immediately following his removal from the office he was made a diplomatic advisor to UAE President Sheikh Khalifa bin Zayed Al Nahyan. In February 2022, Gargash said that the UAE would not "take sides" after Russia invaded Ukraine.

Gargash has been involved with the boards of various UAE institutions, such as the UAE's Culture and Science Symposium, Al Ittihad, Dubai Chamber of Commerce and Industry (DCCI), Emirates Media, Dubai School of Government, Al Owais Cultural Foundation, Dubai Economic Council, the Anwar Gargash Diplomatic Academy, and the Ministerial Legislative Committee. In December 2024, following the downfall of Assad's government is Syria, he spoke at the International Institute for Strategic Studies’ Manama Dialogue in Bahrain. According to APnews he said “Iran’s deterrence thinking is really shattered by events in Gaza, by events in Lebanon and definitely by developments in Syria,”.

== Personal life ==
Gargash is a member of a prominent trading family in Dubai which is part of the minority Huwala in the United Arab Emirates.

In 2017 Gargash received the Distinguished Alumni Achievement Award from George Washington University, and the Abu Dhabi Award in 2017.
