= Mohamed bin Hadi Al Hussaini =

Emirati politician (born 1976)

Mohammed bin Hadi Al Hussaini His Excellency
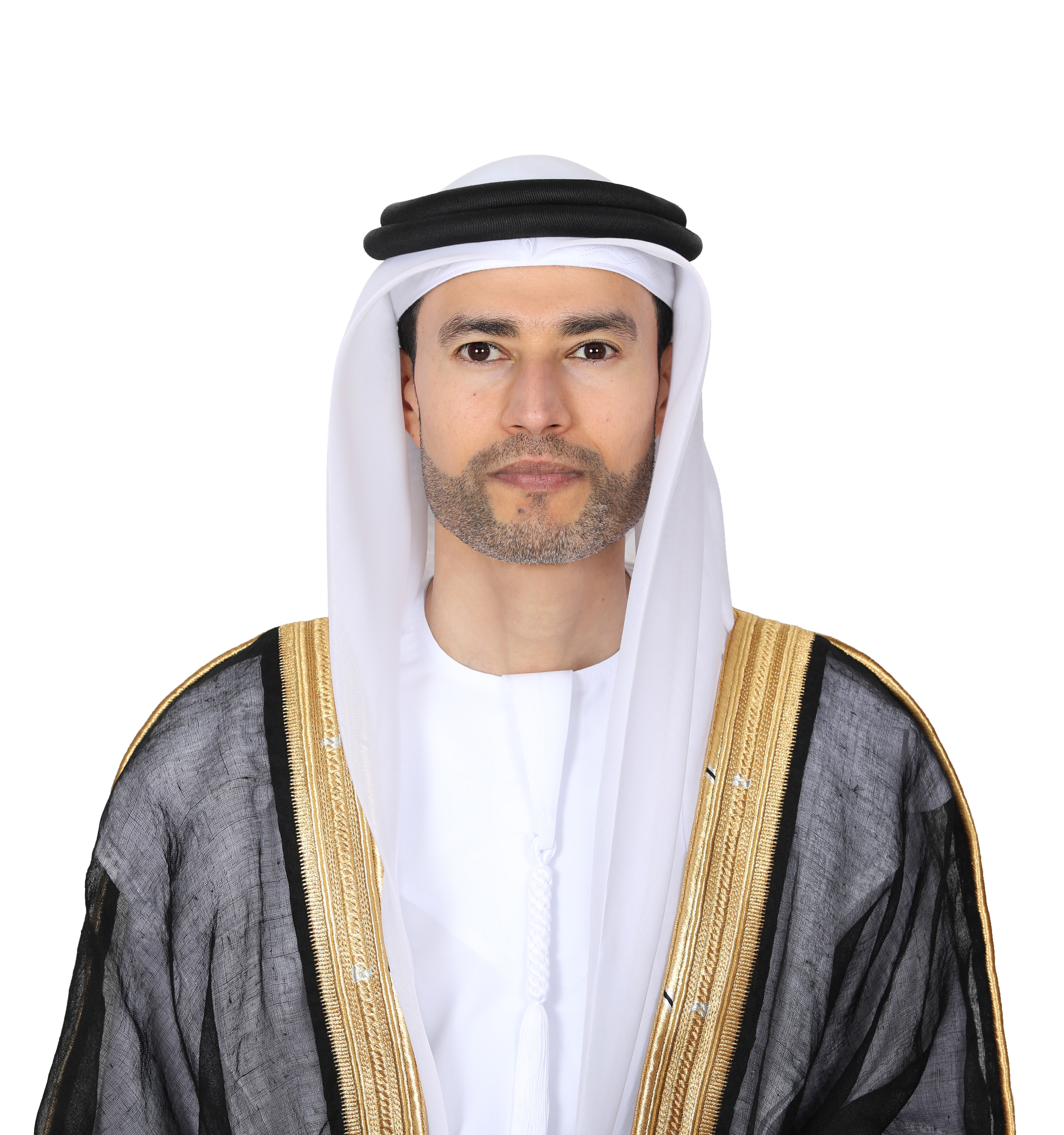
- Mohamed bin Hadi Al Hussaini

Minister of State for Financial Affairs
- Incumbent
- Assumed office September 25, 2021
- President: Mohammed bin Zayed Al Nahyan
- Prime Minister: Mohammed bin Rashid Al Maktoum

Personal details
- Born: Mohammed Hadi Ahmed Abdullah Al Hussaini; January 1, 1976 (age 50)
- Education: Master's in International Business Administration

Mohamed bin Hadi Al Hussaini (Arabic: محمد بن هادي الحسيني; born January 1, 1976) is an Emirati politician who serves as the Minister of State for Financial Affairs in the UAE Cabinet since September 25, 2021.

== Education ==
He earned a Master's degree in International Business Administration from Webster University in Geneva, Switzerland.

== Career ==
Alongside his ministerial work, Al Hussaini serves as the Chairman of Al Etihad Credit Information Company, Deputy Chairman of the Federal Tax Authority Board, and a member of Dubai Government Investments Corporation and the board of directors of the Emirates Investment Authority. He also serves on the board of directors of Emirates NBD Bank since June 2011, Emirates Islamic Bank, and Emaar Malls between December 2017 and September 2021.

Al Hussaini was elected as the President of the Development Committee of the World Bank Group on October 15, 2022.

He also chaired the Board of the General Pension and Social Security Authority, and the board of directors of Du Telecom between March 2018 and September 2021, and Emirates Telecommunications Corporation, and was a member of Maroc Telecom from May 2014 to October 2021, and Mobily from February 2015 to September 2021, and Dubai Refreshments, and DenizBank in Turkey.
