= Sultan bin Zayed bin Sultan Al Nahyan =

Emirati politician (1955–2019)

Sheikh Sultan bin Zayed Al Nahyan
- سلطان بن زايد آل نهيان

3rd Deputy Prime Minister of the United Arab Emirates
- In office 1990–2009 Serving with Hamdan bin Zayed Al Nahyan (1997–2009)
- President: Zayed bin Sultan Al Nahyan (1990–2004); Khalifa bin Zayed Al Nahyan (2004–2009)
- Prime Minister: Maktoum bin Rashid Al Maktoum (1990–2006); Mohammed bin Rashid Al Maktoum (2006–2009)
- Preceded by: Hamdan bin Mohammed Al Nahyan & Maktoum bin Rashid Al Maktoum
- Succeeded by: Saif bin Zayed Al Nahyan & Mansour bin Zayed Al Nahyan

Personal details
- Born: 1 December 1955 Al Ain, Abu Dhabi, Trucial States
- Died: 18 November 2019 (aged 63) Rochester, Minnesota, U.S.
- Spouse: Sheikha Shamsa bint Mohammed bin Khalifa Al Nahyan
- Children: Sheikha Salama; Sheikha Al Yazia; Sheikha Latifa; Sheikh Hazza; Sheikh Khalid; Sheikha Maryam

Sheikh Sultan bin Zayed bin Sultan Al Nahyan (Arabic: سلطان بن زايد بن سلطان آل نهيان; 1955 – 18 November 2019) was an Emirati politician and member of the Al Nahyan family who previously served as the 3rd Deputy Prime Minister of the United Arab Emirates.

== Early life and education ==
Sheikh Sultan was the second son of Sheikh Zayed bin Sultan Al Nahyan, founder of the UAE. He was born in 1953. His mother was his father's second wife, Sheikha bint Madhad Al Mashghouni. Sheikh Sultan was educated at Millfield School in Somerset, England and was a graduate of Royal Military Academy Sandhurst. His older paternal half-brother Sheikh Khalifa, was the president of the United Arab Emirates (2004-2022), while his other half-brother, Sheikh Mohamed, is the current president of the United Arab Emirates and the ruler of Abu Dhabi.

== Career ==
Sheikh Sultan served as the chairman of the UAE Football Association (1976–1981). In 1990, he was appointed as deputy prime minister of the United Arab Emirates.

From 1997 to 2009 he served with his younger half-brother Sheikh Hamdan as deputy prime minister. In 2009, he was replaced by his half-brother Sheikh Saif and Sheikh Mansour in the post.

Sheikh Sultan was the president's representative, chairman of the media and cultural centre, chairman of the Emirates Heritage Club and chairman of Zayed center for coordination and follow-up, a member of Supreme Petroleum Council, and a member of Abu Dhabi Investment Authority.

Sheikh Sultan once served as the chairman of the Zayed Center which was later closed by the UAE government when it became known that it disseminated and provided a platform for anti-American, anti-Semitic, and extreme anti-Israel views.

== Death ==
Sultan bin Zayed died on 18 November 2019.

== Ancestry ==
Ancestors of Sultan bin Zayed bin Sultan Al Nahyan

8. Sheikh Zayed bin Khalifa Al Nahyan
4. Sheikh Sultan bin Zayed Al Nahyan
2. Sheikh Zayed bin Sultan Al Nahyan
10. Sheikh Butti Al Qubaisi
5. Sheikha Salma bint Butti Al Qubaisi
1. Sheikh Sultan bin Zayed Al Nahyan
6. Madhad bin Saif Al Mashghouni
3. Sheikha bint Madhad Al Mashghouni
