= Ministry of State for Federal National Council Affairs (United Arab Emirates) =

Government ministry of the United Arab Emirates

- وزارة الدولة لشؤون المجلس الوطني الاتحاد
- Logo of the UAE Ministry of State for Federal National Council Affairs

Ministry overview
- Formed: 2006
- Jurisdiction: Federal government of the United Arab Emirates
- Headquarters: Abu Dhabi, United Arab Emirates
- Ministry executive: Abdul Rahman Mohammed Al Oweis, Minister of State for Federal National Council Affairs
- Website: mfnca.gov.ae

The Ministry of State for Federal National Council Affairs is the federal ministry of the United Arab Emirates responsible for coordinating elections for the Federal National Council, and disseminating information surrounding parliamentary activities. The ministry was founded in a multi-phased and gradual political reform process by Federal Decree No. (10)/2006, headed by Anwar Gargash, in early 2006. The ministry's founding came after the National Action Program announced by the then president, Khalifa bin Zayed Al-Nahyan to mark the 34th anniversary of the establishment of the UAE.

== Responsibilities ==
According to the decree, the main responsibilities of the ministry are to: coordinate between the government and the Federal National Council (FNC), the official people's representative body, as well as execution of responsibilities, participate in the preparation of legislation concerning the role of the FNC, supervise dissemination of information pertaining to parliamentary activities, and carry out other responsibilities assigned to the minister by virtue of laws, bills, federal decisions or resolutions.

In view of these responsibilities, the ministry seeks to promote a participatory culture in the UAE and develop parliamentary practices in a tolerant and cohesive manner. Consequently, it works towards creating a society that genuinely participates in public life, through coordination between the government, FNC and people, as well as developing a partnership between the institutions of the state, using the best of its human and material resources to achieve the set goal.

== Committees ==
Apart from these issues, the ministry also coordinates the activities of a number of national committees, including the National Committee to Combat Human Trafficking, the committee to Prepare the UAE's Periodic Report on Human Rights and the Committee for Monitoring Developments that Impact the Reputation of the UAE.

== Impact ==
Since the ministry began to serve as a channel between the cabinet and the FNC, it has contributed to a healthy discussion on a range of nationally relevant issues and solutions in the council. The successful deliberations point to the evolution of strong policy-making mechanisms in the country supported by a parliamentary system built on the premises of dialogue, cooperation and action. The FNC's recommendations on key national issues are being given increasing government priority, highlighting the strong link between the legislative and executive branches. The FNC covered topics of national interest such as policies to support the industrial sector and the economy at large in the wake of global inflationary trends, as well as matters pertaining to further improving educational standards. The “high level of synergy between the government and the FNC in dealing with national issues has set the foundations for a new political culture.”

== Elections ==
One of the earliest tasks of the ministry was coordinating the activities of the National Election Committee, which was responsible for conducting the entire process involving the first-ever FNC polls in the country – from the time the elections were announced till the declaration of results. The landmark elections were held on 16, 18 and 20 December 2006. Some of the highlights of the indirect election process are listed below.

- Half the members of the FNC were indirectly elected by a college of councilors; and rest appointed by the rulers of the seven emirates.
- Each ruler constituted a local council which had 100 times the number of FNC representatives – for example, Abu Dhabi and Dubai, which are each entitled to eight seats on the FNC, nominated 800 electors each to their respective electoral colleges. Similarly, Sharjah and Ras Al-Khaimah are entitled to six each, while Umm Al-Qaiwain, Ajman and Fujairah are entitled to four seats each on the FNC, and were able to nominate members in multiples of 100.
- All these representatives combined then elected half the members of each emirate to the FNC, with the ruler appointing the other half
- The final approved Election Commission list had 6,595 members, including about 1,162 women, to be members of seven local assemblies that would vote.
- In all, 452 candidates, 63 of them women, contested the elections.
- While one woman was directly elected to the FNC, the government nominated eight others to the 40-member Council, which translates into a 22.5 percent share of the seats.

The UAE government hopes to expand the political participation and reform process in the following way.

- The next stage could include an expansion of the number of members serving in the FNC, as well as increasing the FNC's scope of authority and responsibility
- The final and most advanced stage could encompass actual comprehensive and direct elections of half the FNC members.
