= Hamdan bin Rashid Al Maktoum =

Emirati politician (1945–2021)

Sheikh Hamdan bin Rashid Al Maktoum
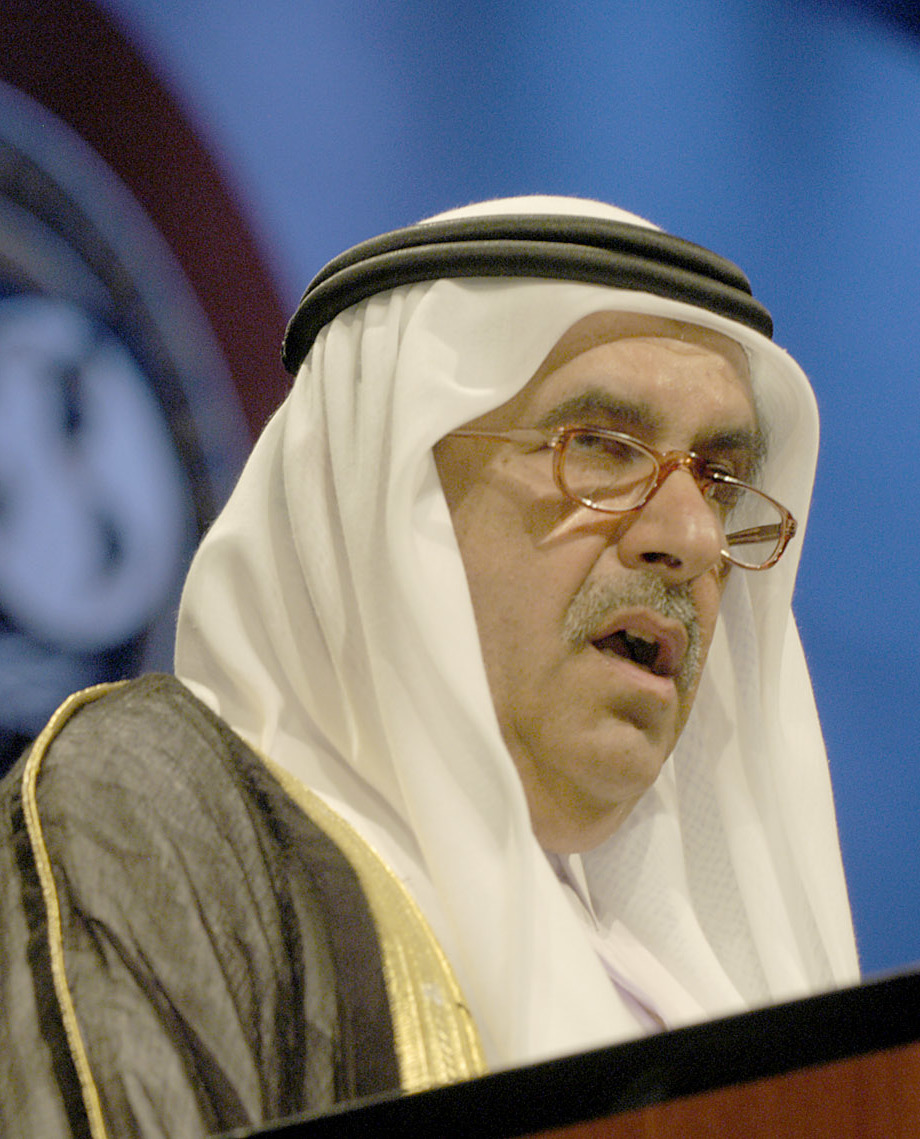
- Sheikh Hamdan in 2003

Deputy Prime Minister of the United Arab Emirates
- In office 9 December 1971 – 1973
- President: Zayed bin Sultan Al Nahyan
- Prime Minister: Maktoum bin Rashid Al Maktoum
- Succeeded by: Khalifa bin Zayed Al Nahyan

Minister of Finance and Industry
- In office 9 December 1971 – 24 March 2021
- President: Zayed bin Sultan Al Nahyan (1971–2004); Khalifa bin Zayed Al Nahyan (2004–2021)
- Prime Minister: Maktoum bin Rashid Al Maktoum (1971–1979); Rashid bin Saeed Al Maktoum (1979–1990); Maktoum bin Rashid Al Maktoum (1990–2006); Mohammed bin Rashid Al Maktoum (2006–2021)
- Succeeded by: Obaid Al Tayer (acting)

Deputy Ruler of Dubai
- In office 2006 – 24 March 2021 Serving with Hamdan bin Mohammed Al Maktoum (2006–2008) and Maktoum bin Mohammed Al Maktoum (2008–2021)
- Monarch: Mohammed bin Rashid Al Maktoum

Personal details
- Born: 25 December 1945 Bur Dubai, Dubai, Trucial States
- Died: 24 March 2021 (aged 75)
- Spouse: Rodha bint Ahmed bin Juma Al Maktoum
- Issue: 6
- Father: Rashid bin Saeed Al Maktoum
- Mother: Latifa bint Hamdan Al Nahyan

Sheikh Hamdan bin Rashid Al Maktoum (Arabic: حمدان بن راشد أل مكتوم, Ḥamdān bin Rāšid Āl Maktūm; 25 December 1945 – 24 March 2021) was an Emirati politician, the deputy ruler of Dubai and the minister of finance and industry of the United Arab Emirates (UAE). He was the second son of the late ruler Rashid bin Saeed Al Maktoum. Hamdan bin Rashid Al Maktoum was the head of the UAE's delegation at the International Monetary Fund and the OPEC Fund.

== Early life and education ==
Sheikh Hamdan was born on 25 December 1945. He was the second of four sons of Sheikh Rashid bin Saeed Al Maktoum, the Sheikh who led Dubai to unification with the other six emirates to form the UAE.

Sheikh Hamdan's formal schooling began in Dubai. He attended Al Madrasah Al-Ahlia, where he studied mathematics, English, basic sciences, Arabic and Islamic studies. He went on to complete his further studies at the Bell School of Languages in Cambridge between 1967 and 1968. In Britain, Hamdan bin Rashid Al Maktoum developed an interest in thoroughbred racing.

These years saw a great deal of development in the UAE. While Dubai and Abu Dhabi had begun the process of modernisation, it was far from complete; many areas in the remaining five emirates needed electricity, roads, housing, and clean water supplies. As minister of finance and industry, Sheikh Hamdan oversaw such work, while he was also charged with developing the economy and an industrial base. The UAE's rulers understood that the country could not afford to isolate its efforts in the petroleum sector, despite the fact that in 1971 the majority of federal government revenues were derived from this source.

In Dubai, Sheikh Rashid also placed his second son in charge of an array of key governmental industrial enterprises, including the Dubai Aluminium Company, Dubai Gas Company, Dubai Cable Company, and Oilfields Supply Center, among others.

== Career ==
Sheikh Hamdan was appointed the deputy prime minister and minister of finance and industry of the United Arab Emirates on 9 December 1971, when the first cabinet was formed. He was later appointed deputy ruler of Dubai. He invited a delegation from the Islamic Research Academy on 3 April 1999 to discuss the launch of an effort and human investment in preparing an academic team of young scholars as specialists in Islamic Jerusalem Studies. This resulted in the launch of several scholarships to reward distinguished young scholars, which then led to the establishment of the Al-Maktoum Institute in Dundee, Scotland, with unique postgraduate programmes with the University of Aberdeen. Sheikh Hamdan was also the benefactor and the Patron of the "Shaikh Hamdan Bin Rashid Al-Maktoum Award for Medical Excellence", an award instituted to reward excellence in the field of medical sciences with its comprehensive, dynamic and exciting features to benefit competing researchers, scientists and medical institutions.

== Thoroughbred horse racing ==
Introduced to thoroughbred flat racing while a student in the United Kingdom, Sheikh Hamdan established his first racing stable there in 1981. Over the years he invested heavily in both racing and breeding and acquired major operations in England, Ireland, and the United States. His blue and white racing colours saw significant success across the world.

The Dubai Arabian Horse Championship is held through the patronage of Sheikh Hamdan.

Sheikh Hamdan's horse, Eastern Anthem, won the 2009 Dubai Sheema Classic.

== Philanthropy ==
He supported UNESCO with the "Hamdan bin Rashid Al-Maktoum Prize for Outstanding Practice and Performance in Enhancing the Effectiveness of Teachers".

== Death ==
Sheikh Hamdan bin Rashid Al Maktoum died on 24 March 2021 at the age of 75. The cause of death was not specified.
