= Abdullah bin Zayed Al Nahyan =

United Arab Emirates minister of foreign affairs (born 1972)

His Highness Sheikh Abdullah bin Zayed Al Nahyan
- عبد الله بن زايد آل نهيان
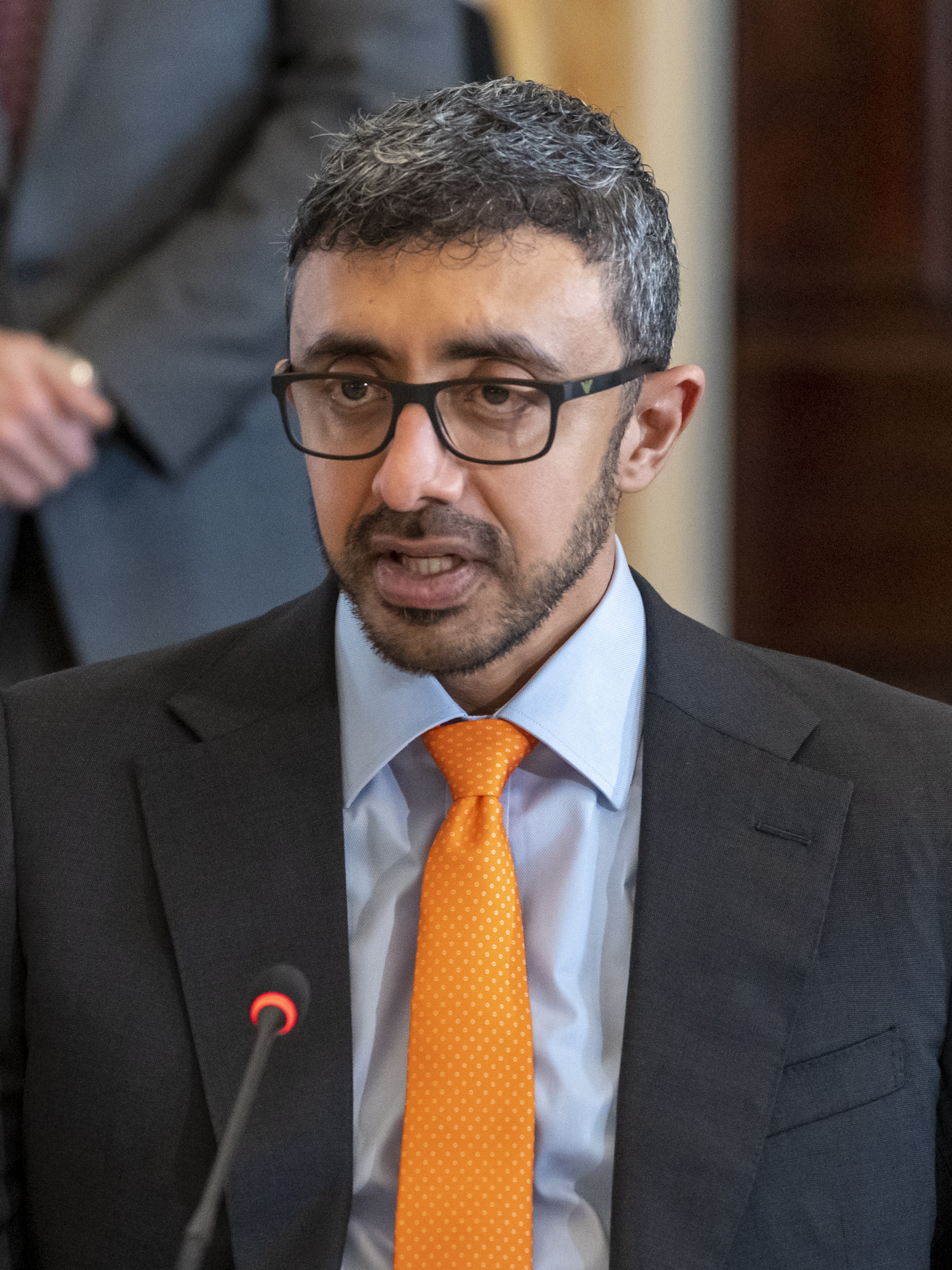
- Abdullah in 2023

Deputy Prime Minister of the United Arab Emirates
- Incumbent
- Assumed office 14 July 2024 Serving with 4 other people
- President: Mohamed bin Zayed Al Nahyan
- Prime Minister: Mohammed bin Rashid Al Maktoum

Minister of Foreign Affairs of the United Arab Emirates
- Incumbent
- Assumed office 9 February 2006
- President: Khalifa bin Zayed Al Nahyan; Mohamed bin Zayed Al Nahyan
- Prime Minister: Mohammed bin Rashid Al Maktoum
- Preceded by: Rashid Abdullah Al Nuaimi

Minister of Information and Culture of the United Arab Emirates
- In office 23 March 1997 – 9 February 2006
- President: Zayed bin Sultan Al Nahyan; Khalifa bin Zayed Al Nahyan
- Prime Minister: Maktoum bin Rashid Al Maktoum; Mohammed bin Rashid Al Maktoum
- Preceded by: Khalfan bin Mohammed Al Roumi
- Succeeded by: Position abolished

Personal details
- Born: 30 April 1972 (age 54) Abu Dhabi, United Arab Emirates
- Spouse: Al Jazia bint Saif bin Mohammed Al Nahyan
- Children: Fatima; Mohammed; Zayed; Saif; Theyab
- Parents: Zayed bin Sultan Al Nahyan (father); Fatima bint Mubarak Al Ketbi (mother)
- Education: United Arab Emirates University

Abdullah bin Zayed bin Sultan Al Nahyan (AbZ) (Arabic: عبد الله بن زايد بن سلطان آل نهيان; born 30 April 1972) is an Emirati politician serving as the foreign minister of the UAE since 2006, in addition to acting as one of four deputy prime ministers of the United Arab Emirates since 2009. He is the ninth son of the founder of the United Arab Emirates, Zayed bin Sultan Al Nahyan. In 2020, he was a signatory of the Abraham Accords on behalf of the UAE.

== Personal life ==
Abdullah bin Zayed was born in Abu Dhabi on 30 April 1972. He holds a degree in political science from UAE University. He is married to Alyazia bint Saif Al Nahyan, who became an FAO Goodwill Ambassador extraordinary in 2010, and has five children: Fatima, Mohammed, Zayed, Saif and Theyab.

== Career ==
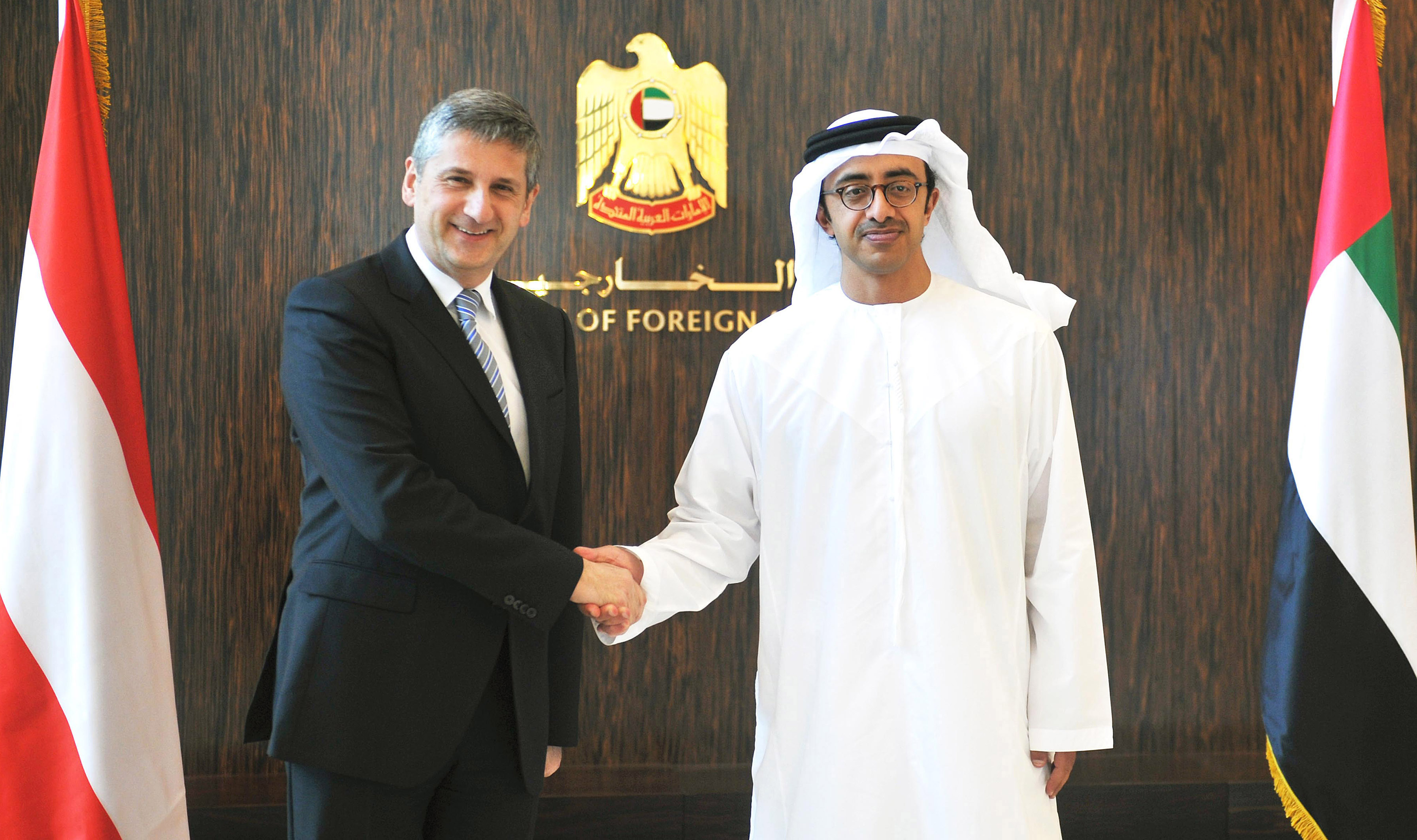
Abdullah with Michael Spindelegger in 2013

Abdullah bin Zayed Al Nahyan was appointed Minister of Foreign Affairs and International Cooperation of the United Arab Emirates on 9 February 2006.

In 2017, leaked emails highlighted that Abdullah bin Zayed maintained close contacts with former UK prime minister Tony Blair, who was being funded by the UAE as the Middle East peace envoy. Blair held a number of official meetings with the UAE Foreign Minister. The emails also revealed that Abdullah bin Zayed was one of the UAE royals who supported the envoy financially. In 2011, Abdullah's office separately sent US$2 million to Blair through Windrush Ventures, which channeled money for Tony Blair's commercial advisory work. The UAE Foreign Ministry also transferred $12 million to Windrush for Blair consultancy work in Colombia, Vietnam and Mongolia.

In August 2017, Abdullah urged Iran and Turkey to end what the UAE claimed were "colonial" actions in Syria, signaling unease about diminishing Gulf Arab influence in the war, and calling for "the exit of those parties trying to reduce the sovereignty of the Syrian state." He further stated that "if Iran and Turkey continue the same historical, colonial and competitive behavior and perspectives between them in Arab affairs, we will continue in this situation not just in Syria today but tomorrow in some other country."

On 14 February 2019, Abdullah said that Israel was justified in attacking Iranian targets in Syria.

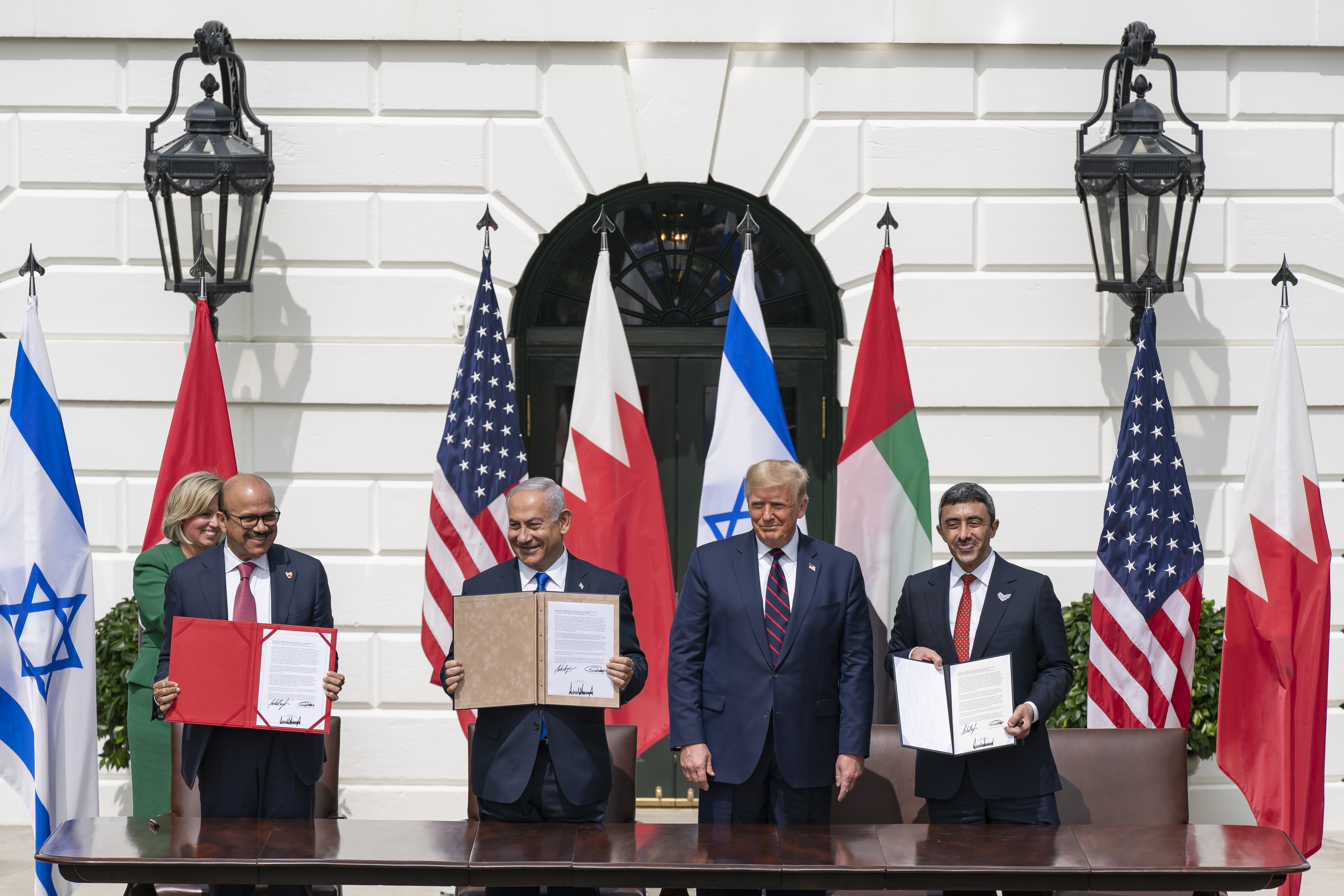
Abdullah (right) at the White House Abraham Accords signing ceremony on 15 September 2020

On 15 September 2020, Abdullah signed the official Israel–United Arab Emirates peace agreement in a ceremony at the White House in Washington, D.C., US.

In February 2022, the UAE abstained in a UN Security Council vote to condemn Russia for invading Ukraine. Abdullah had a call with US Secretary of State Antony Blinken prior to the UN Security Council vote. In the phone call, Blinken spoke of the "importance of building a strong international response to support Ukrainian sovereignty through the UN Security Council." The Emirati report of the phone call did not include Blinken's statement.

On 7 January 2025 while serving as Deputy Prime Minister and Minister of Foreign Affairs, he received Gideon Sa'ar, Minister of Foreign Affairs of Israel, in Abu Dhabi to discuss bilateral relations between the two countries.

In March 2026, during the 2026 Iran war, Abdullah told US Secretary of State Marco Rubio that the UAE is prepared for a war lasting up to nine months.

== Other roles ==
Abdullah bin Zayed is a member of the UAE's National Security Council, Deputy Chairman of the UAE's Permanent Committee on Borders, Chairman of the National Media Council, chairman of the Board of Directors of the Emirates Foundation for Youth Development, Deputy Chairman of the Board of Directors of the Abu Dhabi Fund for Development (ADFD) and Board Member of the National Defense College.

He served as Minister of Information and Culture from 1997 to 2006. He had previously served as Chairman of Emirates Media Incorporated, Chairman of the UAE Football Association (1993–2001), and as the Under Secretary of the Ministry of Information and Culture from 1995 to 1997.

== Honours ==
- Albania: Order of Skanderbeg (decorated by President of Albania Bujar Nishani on 13 March 2016).
- United Kingdom: Honorary Knight Commander of the Order of St Michael and St George.

== Ancestry ==
Ancestors of Abdullah bin Zayed Al Nahyan

16. Khalifa bin Shakbut Al Nahyan
8. Zayed bin Khalifa Al Nahyan
4. Sultan bin Zayed bin Khalifa Al Nahyan
2. Zayed bin Sultan Al Nahyan
10. Butti Al Qubaisi
5. Salma bint Butti Al Qubaisi
1. Abdullah bin Zayed Al Nahyan
6. Mubarak Al Ketbi
3. Fatima bint Mubarak Al Ketbi

== See also ==
- List of foreign ministers in 2017
- List of current foreign ministers
