= Rashid bin Saeed Al Maktoum =

2nd Prime Minister of the United Arab Emirates (1912–1990)

- His Highness Sheikh
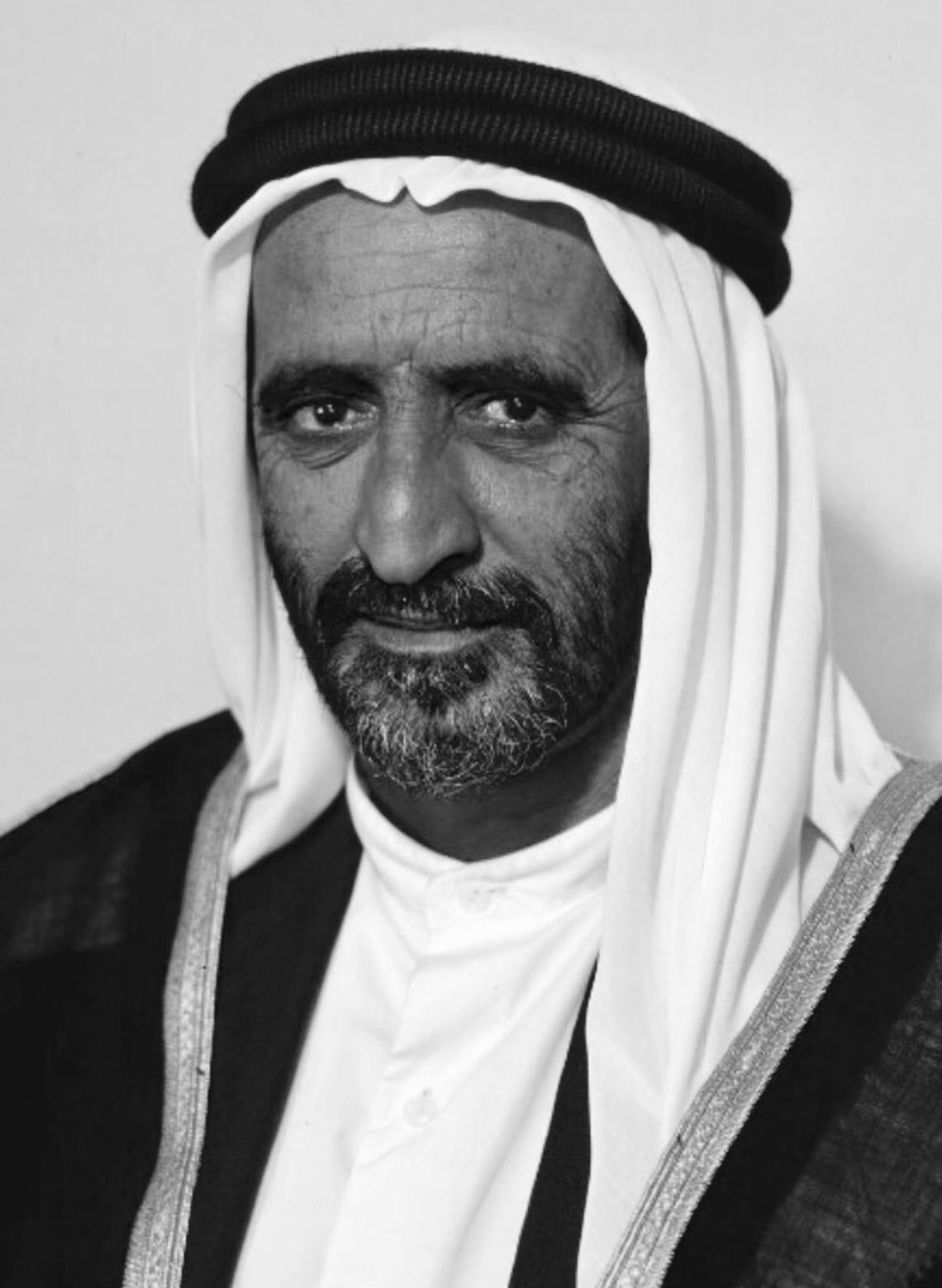
- Sheikh Rashid in 1971

Vice President of the United Arab Emirates
- In office 2 December 1971 – 7 October 1990
- President: Zayed bin Sultan Al Nahyan
- Prime Minister: Maktoum bin Rashid Al Maktoum (1971–1979); Himself (1979–1990)
- Preceded by: Post established
- Succeeded by: Maktoum bin Rashid Al Maktoum

2nd Prime Minister of the United Arab Emirates
- In office 30 April 1979 – 7 October 1990
- President: Zayed bin Sultan Al Nahyan
- Deputy: Hamdan bin Mohammed Al Nahyan (1979–1989); Maktoum bin Rashid Al Maktoum
- Preceded by: Maktoum bin Rashid Al Maktoum
- Succeeded by: Maktoum bin Rashid Al Maktoum

Ruler of Dubai
- Reign: 10 September 1958 – 7 October 1990
- Predecessor: Saeed bin Maktoum Al Maktoum
- Successor: Maktoum bin Rashid Al Maktoum
- Born: 11 June 1912; Dubai, Trucial States
- Died: 7 October 1990 (aged 78); Dubai, United Arab Emirates
- Spouse: Latifa bint Hamdan bin Zayed Al Nahyan (m. 1940; died 1983)
- Issue: Maktoum; Hamdan; Mohammed; Ahmed; Maryam; Fatima; Hassa; Maitha; Shaikha
Names
- His Highness Sheikh Rashid bin Saeed bin Maktoum bin Hasher bin Maktoum bin Butti bin Suhail Al Maktoum
- Father: Saeed bin Maktoum bin Hasher Al Maktoum
- Mother: Hessa bint Al Mur Al Falasi
- Religion: Sunni Islam

Sheikh Rashid bin Saeed Al Maktoum (Arabic: رَاشِد بن سَعِيْد آل مَكتُوم, romanized: Rāšid bin Saʿīd Āl Maktūm; 11 June 1912 – 7 October 1990) was an Emirati royal, politician and one of the Founding Fathers of the United Arab Emirates.

Rashid bin Saeed was the first vice president and second prime minister of the United Arab Emirates, and was the ruler of Dubai from 1958–1990. His son, Maktoum, was the UAE's first prime minister. He was vice president of the UAE from the nation's independence and foundation in 1971 until his death.

Sheikh Rashid was the first Emirati vice president to serve concurrently as prime minister, when he became prime minister on 30 April 1979. After his death the office of prime minister was de facto tied to the office of vice president.

He was responsible for the transformation of Dubai from a small settlement around Dubai Creek to a modern port city, regional commercial hub and entrepôt.

== Accession ==
Rashid bin Saeed Al Maktoum acceded as Ruler of Dubai following his father's death on 10 September 1958. Rashid had already been effectively managing the affairs of the emirate since the late 1930s having refused, in the face of considerable pressure from the British, to force his father to abdicate.

As de facto ruler of Dubai, he had already started to implement a widespread program of reforms and improvements despite limited revenues. He was known for his habit of touring the town in the early hours, visiting project sites and subsequently querying progress during his several daily Majlis sessions. He would also revisit sites during the evening riding his horse, Saqlawi.

Through the 1950s and early 1960s, Rashid's office building by the creekside had a mirrored window on the first floor that overlooked the unloading area on the wharfage with its single crane and he would place a retainer there to oversee the ships unloading. When the merchants came to pay their fees the next morning, their manifests would be compared to the tally Rashid's man had made.

== Trade and development ==
Dubai's customs had already been reformed prior to World War II and its port, by the 1950s the most important in the Gulf, was thriving. Dubai's mercantile traders had found a lucrative source of revenue in providing gold to India. The Indian government controlled gold imports and imposed tariffs, so merchants in Dubai, funded by British banks, shipped gold in large quantities from London by air and then sent it by dhow to India's three-mile limit where the bullion would be handed over to Indian traders who carried out the 'actual' smuggling.

Dubai’s trade in gold exploded, as did trade in other commodities. By 1966 Dubai was the third largest export market for gold from London, receiving some 4 million ounces. Traders in the town that year imported (and, in the main, re-exported) over 15 million dollars’ worth of watches and 5.5 million ounces of silver.

In 1967, gold traded in the souks of Dubai at thirty-five dollars an ounce sold in India for sixty-eight dollars an ounce. The gold was packaged in ten tola bars, a tola being a little over 11.66 grams, flown in boxes of 200 or 250 ingots, consigned by Sharps Pixley, Mocatta and Goldsmid, Samuel Montagu, Bullion Exchange and the Swiss Bank Corporation. While some traders dealt with these houses directly, most managed their trades through the British Bank of the Middle East (BBME), the National Bank of Dubai and the First National City Bank of New York.

"Everyone in Dubai with a rupee to his name was in on the business and plane loads of gold ingots could be left overnight, piled up unguarded on the Dubai airstrip, because no-one would steal them," according to Trucial Oman Scouts Commander Freddie De Butts.

=== Infrastructure ===
Dubai’s busy creek was shallow and silting up and Rashid had a plan drawn up by British engineering consultancy Halcrow in 1954 to dredge the waterway. He issued ‘creek bonds’ to help pay for the scheme, and took a £500,000 loan from Kuwait to pay for the dredging operation, which took place between 1958 and 1959. This allowed larger ships to put in at Dubai, up to 500 tonnes.

The material brought up from the creek was used to shore up the tidal area of Ghubaiba (which could only be crossed at high tide using a series of concrete stepping stones) and also to extend the coast at Shindagha. Reclaimed land was sold off to help pay for the dredging. Rashid also commissioned British consulting company John Harris to draw up a town plan for infrastructural development, a visionary move and the first structured town plan in the Gulf.

With no oil revenues at that time, funds for Dubai's development could only be raised by loans, taxation or public subscription and Rashid's far-sighted development plans involved some far-sighted fund raising schemes. Private companies were founded - Rashid started a water company, bringing fresh water into the city from the wells of Al Awir. An electricity company was founded, building a 6,400-kilowatt power station in Deira in 1961. Rashid’s daughter, Maryam, married the Emir of Qatar, Sheikh Ahmad bin Ali Al Thani in 1961 and his backing (limited, as Qatar had yet to find its gas field and so wasn't a wealthy country) was nevertheless a welcome boost. When India devalued the Gulf Rupee in 1966, both Qatar and Dubai adopted the Qatar-Dubai Riyal as a common currency, whereas Abu Dhabi adopted the Bahraini dinar.

Dubai Police was founded in 1956, under a British commander, Major P. Lorimer, with its headquarters in Naif, in Deira. That force was later taken over by Jack Briggs, who moved from the Trucial Oman Scouts to take up the post at Rashid’s invitation.

A Dubai municipal council was founded (to become Dubai Municipality), in 1957 and by 1961 was employing forty staff and 120 labourers. A Dubai Port Committee was established and improvements took place throughout the wharfage and coastal area, including the construction of steel piled wharves on either side of the creek. The tiny treadmill crane outside the Ruler’s office, which had been installed there by Gray Mackenzie in 1954, was supplemented by seven mobile cranes.

The first crossing of Dubai Creek was Maktoum Bridge, built in 1963, with a loan from Rashid’s son-in-law, Ahmad bin Ali Al Thani of Qatar. The loan was repaid by charging a toll for the use of the bridge from Dubai to Deira. This first version of Salik, Dubai’s road toll system today, was implemented by charging for small books of ten blue ‘chits’, each crossing from Dubai to Deira would require one 'chit' to be handed in. Because people couldn't be bothered to actually stop, they opened the window and let a chit fly out, the little paper rectangles eventually turning the road surface blue. Maktoum Bridge was to be followed by a second crossing of the creek, the Al Shindagha Tunnel, in 1975.

=== Discovery of oil ===
While Abu Dhabi found oil in 1958 and commenced exports in 1962, Dubai remained resolutely oil-free to Rashid's great frustration. His prayers were answered in 1966 with the discovery of the Fateh (fortune) field 60 miles offshore. Raising credit against his anticipated revenues, he ordered the construction of a four-berth deep sea container terminal, named Port Rashid. This long-held dream (he had originally commissioned a plan for such a terminal in 1965) was to result in the award of the £9 million contract in June 1967, again under Halcrow. During the construction of the port Rashid called Halcrow's resident head, Nevil Allen, to his office and asked that the company cancel many of the planned outbuildings and support infrastructure and instead focus on building more berths, increasing the design to a 16-berth port. He would eventually expand the contract to encompass 21 berths. Port Rashid opened in 1972.

Rashid's aggressive expansion saw the population of Dubai boom from 59,000 people in 1968 to over 278,000 in 1980. The first tarmac road built in the interior was to Dubai's mountainous exclave Hatta, to bring in aggregate and concrete from the Hajar Mountains, which was far cheaper than importing construction materials. The savings made supported Rashid's plans to accelerate development even further.

== Independence and Union ==
The British politician Goronwy Roberts travelled to the Trucial States and met with the Trucial rulers between 8 and 11 January 1968, to let them know that Great Britain was unilaterally ending its protectorate. Britain was pulling its armed forces out of the area by the end of 1971 and take no further responsibility for the Trucial States or their international relations.

Sheikh Rashid and Sheikh Zayed bin Sultan Al Nahyan, the ruler of Abu Dhabi, both travelled to London to press the government to reconsider the move – or at least to put in place an arrangement where the rulers could pay for British military assistance. This resulted in British Defence Secretary Denis Healey telling the BBC's Panorama that he disliked the idea of being ‘a sort of white slaver for Arab sheikhs’. Healey was forced to apologise for the comment.

However, Zayed had long believed in the wisdom of a Union of Trucial rulers and he arranged to meet Rashid in neutral territory between their two emirates for talks. The location they picked was a little known area of desert near the desert village of Semeih, called Argoub Al Sedirah. On 18 February 1968 the two men met in a tent erected in the desert and talked for hours, served cups of ghawa (Arabic coffee) by Rashid's young son, Mohammed. Just 20 years before, Dubai and Abu Dhabi had been at war, Rashid's Bedouin forces fighting in his father's name across a wide front against those of Zayed's deposed brother, Shakhbut. Rashid's wife, Latifa, was the daughter of the murdered former ruler of Abu Dhabi, Sheikh Hamdan bin Zayed bin Khalifa Al Nahyan, and an ongoing border dispute provided another source of longstanding friction between Rashid's father, Sheikh Saeed, Rashid and Shakhbut. The meeting with Zayed was therefore a conciliation before it became an agreement. Agreeing to the principle of a Union, Rashid and Zayed shook hands on the deal, thereby establishing the only nation in the world founded on a handshake.

A meeting of the rulers of the Trucial States and those of Bahrain and Qatar took place on 25 February and on the 27 February they announced the ‘Federation of the Arab Emirates’.

While the seven Rulers of the Trucial States had become used to working together at the Trucial States Council, established by the British in 1952, Bahrain and Qatar were outsiders and disagreed on a wide range of issues. Eventually they were to leave the proposed Union and each would announce their own independence. As late as July 1970, Sheikh Rashid was to tell The Times of London that he would welcome a continued British military presence, but it was not to be.

On 18 July 1971, it was declared that the State of the United Arab Emirates would be formed, comprising Abu Dhabi, Dubai, Sharjah, Ajman, Umm Al Quwain and Fujairah. Ras Al Khaimah would join the following year. Rashid would be Prime Minister and Zayed President.

One of the key proponents of Union, Rashid bin Saeed Al Maktoum was also cautious about the pace and reach of 'Federation'. A shrewd (Freddie De Butts, the Commander of the Trucial Oman Scouts called him ‘wily’) negotiator, Rashid secured political parity with Abu Dhabi in the number of seats allocated to Dubai in the Federal National Council and, together with Abu Dhabi, Dubai held a veto in the Supreme Council.

== Jebel Ali ==
British construction consultancy Halcrow's man in Dubai, Nevil Allen, received a 5am call in 1971 asking him to meet Sheikh Rashid at Ras Hasa, a hill overlooking the coastal area of Jebel Ali. He found Rashid bin Saeed there, along with a number of advisors including finance head Bill Duff. Rashid announced that he wanted a port built there and outlined the scale of his idea. He wanted a costing that day and Allen obliged - and got the go-ahead to proceed. The 66-berth Jebel Ali Port was, when it opened in 1983, the world's largest man-made harbour and remains so today.

Rashid built the Dubai World Trade Centre, a thirty-nine-storey tower that was at the time it was inaugurated in 1979, the tallest building in the Middle East. Alongside the tower, an exhibition centre was constructed. At the time, people complained that the Trade Centre was "impossibly far out of town". He opened Dubai Dry Docks in 1983, with the ability to cater to vessels of up to one million tons.

Queen Elizabeth II's visit to Dubai in 1979 was to demonstrate Rashid bin Saeed's showman qualities. He had her inaugurate a number of buildings and facilities, including Jebel Ali Port, the Dubai Aluminium smelter (DUBAL), the Dubai Desalination Plant and the Dubai World Trade Centre. Every one of the projects she 'opened' had been operating for months, but Rashid had an eye to headlines in the British press.

== Aviation ==
In 1960 Rashid had pressured the British for the right to build an airstrip (it was the British view that Dubai didn't need one because neighbouring Sharjah already had one). Rashid petitioned the then-office manager of British Overseas Airways Corporation (BOAC, British Airways' predecessor) in Bombay to schedule regular flights between Bombay and Dubai and in order to secure his backing, promised to pay for any unsold tickets. The manager agreed and flights commenced - and Rashid never had to buy a ticket, the planes flew full. The BOAC manager's name was Maurice Flanagan and he would, in 1985, become the founding CEO of Emirates. The first flights to Dubai airport flew in 1961 and in May 1965, an asphalt runway was constructed, allowing jetliners to land.

In the late 1960s, Rashid's young son Mohammed was given key elements of Dubai's fast-expanding portfolio to manage, including Dubai’s civil defence, Dubai Petroleum and Dubai Airport. In 1983, Dubai Duty Free opened at the airport, an operation planned by consultants from Shannon Airport and the Irish airport management company Aer Rianta.

The rapid and integrated expansion of Dubai's aviation, tourism and MICE sector was developed beginning in the early 1980s by Rashid's son Mohammed, with his father's guidance and approval: Mohammed presented his plans for 'Destination Dubai' to Rashid (already ailing), who agreed the entire package with the single word namus (fine).

== Death ==
Sheikh Rashid bin Saeed Al Maktoum died, after almost a decade of illness, on 7 October 1990.

Both his predecessor and successor as Prime Minister of the UAE was his son, Sheikh Maktoum bin Rashid Al Maktoum. Sheikh Maktoum bin Rashid was the prime minister of United Arab Emirates from 1971 to 1979, and acceded as ruler of Dubai on his father's death on 7 October 1990.

== Family ==
Sheikh Rashid's father was Sheikh Saeed bin Maktoum Al Maktoum, while his mother was Sheikha Hessa bint Al Mur bin Hureiz Al Falasi.

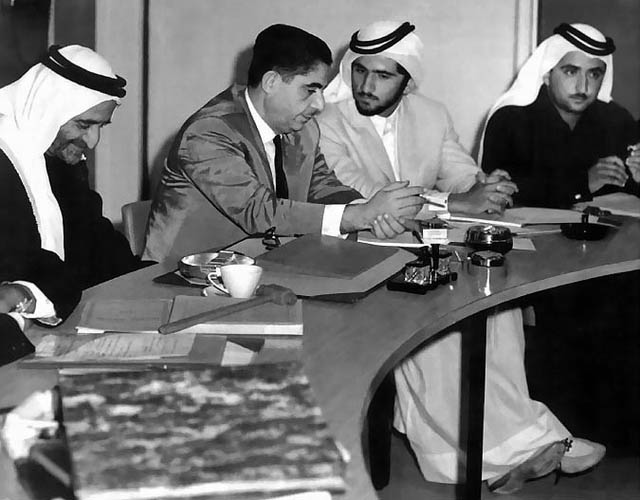
Left to right: Sheikh Rashid, Adi Bitar, and Sheikh Rashid's sons Mohammed and Maktoum, both future rulers of Dubai, in 1968

Sheikh Rashid Al Maktoum married only once. His wife, Sheikha Latifa bint Hamdan Al Nahyan, was the daughter of Sheikh Hamdan bin Zayed Al Nahyan, who ruled Abu Dhabi for the decade between 1912–22. Following the murder of her father, Sheikha Latifa fled, along with other family members, to Dubai.

Rashid and Latifa had nine children, four sons and five daughters:

1. Maktoum bin Rashid Al Maktoum (1943–2006), who succeeded his father as ruler of Dubai (ruled 1990–2006)
2. Hamdan bin Rashid Al Maktoum (1945–2021)
3. Mohammed bin Rashid Al Maktoum (born 1949), who succeeded his elder brother as ruler of Dubai (ruling since 2006)
4. Ahmed bin Rashid Al Maktoum (1950–2026)
5. Maryam bint Rashid Al Maktoum married the Qatari emir, Ahmad bin Ali Al Thani, deposed in 1972.
6. Fatima bint Rashid Al Maktoum.
7. Hassa bint Rashid Al Maktoum married Ahmed bin Maktoum bin Juma Al Maktoum. Their children are Latifa bint Ahmed Al Maktoum and Rashid bin Ahmed Al Maktoum.
8. Maitha bint Rashid Al Maktoum.
9. Shaikha bint Rashid Al Maktoum married Abdulaziz bin Saud bin Mohammed Al Saud. They have 3 sons: Rashid, Saud, and Mohammed.

Sheikh Rashid was half-brother—46 years older—to Sheikh Ahmed bin Saeed Al Maktoum, the chairman of the airline Emirates.

== See also ==
- Timeline of Dubai

Preceded by Saeed bin Maktoum bin Hasher Al Maktoum	Ruler of Dubai; 1958–1990	Succeeded by Maktoum bin Rashid Al Maktoum
Preceded by Maktoum bin Rashid Al Maktoum	Prime Minister of the United Arab Emirates; 1979–1990	Succeeded by Maktoum bin Rashid Al Maktoum
