= Maktoum bin Rashid Al Maktoum =

2nd vice president, 1st and 3rd prime minister of the United Arab Emirates

- His Highness Sheikh
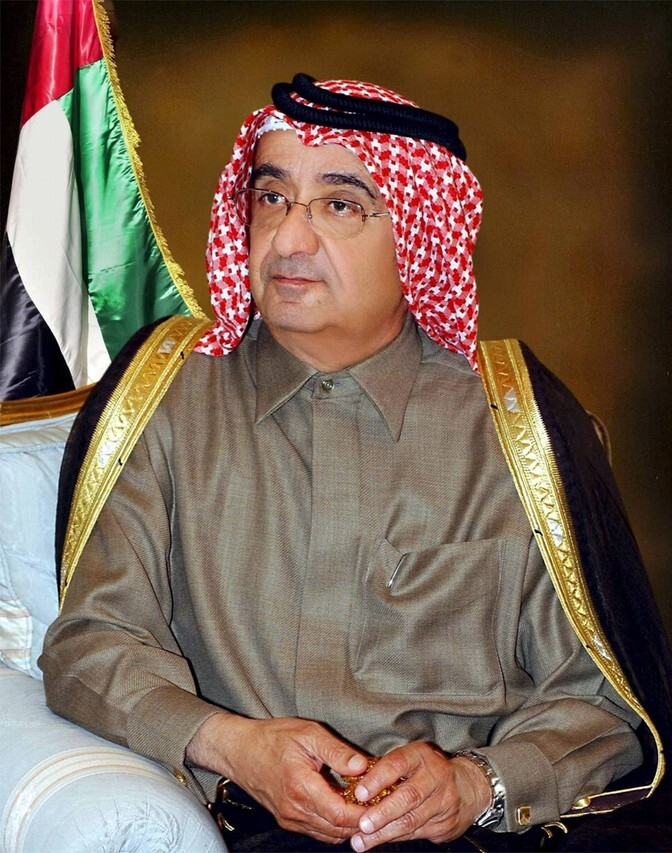
- Sheikh Maktoum in 2002

Acting President of the United Arab Emirates
- In office 2 November 2004 – 3 November 2004
- Prime Minister: Himself
- Preceded by: Zayed bin Sultan Al Nahyan
- Succeeded by: Khalifa bin Zayed Al Nahyan

Vice President of the United Arab Emirates
- In office 7 October 1990 – 4 January 2006
- President: Zayed bin Sultan Al Nahyan; Khalifa bin Zayed Al Nahyan
- Preceded by: Rashid bin Saeed Al Maktoum
- Succeeded by: Mohammed bin Rashid Al Maktoum

Prime Minister of the United Arab Emirates
- In office 9 December 1971 – 30 April 1979
- President: Zayed bin Sultan Al Nahyan
- Deputy: Hamdan bin Rashid Al Maktoum; Khalifa bin Zayed Al Nahyan; Hamdan bin Mohammed Al Nahyan
- Preceded by: Post established
- Succeeded by: Rashid bin Saeed Al Maktoum
- In office 7 October 1990 – 4 January 2006
- President: Zayed bin Sultan Al Nahyan; Khalifa bin Zayed Al Nahyan
- Deputy: Sultan bin Zayed Al Nahyan; Hamdan bin Zayed Al Nahyan
- Preceded by: Rashid bin Saeed Al Maktoum
- Succeeded by: Mohammed bin Rashid Al Maktoum

Deputy Prime Minister of the United Arab Emirates
- In office 30 April 1979 – 7 October 1990 Serving with Hamdan bin Mohammed Al Nahyan
- President: Zayed bin Sultan Al Nahyan
- Prime Minister: Rashid bin Saeed Al Maktoum
- Preceded by: Khalifa bin Zayed Al Nahyan
- Succeeded by: Sultan bin Zayed Al Nahyan

Ruler of Dubai
- Reign: 7 October 1990 – 4 January 2006
- Predecessor: Rashid bin Saeed Al Maktoum
- Successor: Mohammed bin Rashid Al Maktoum
- Born: 15 August 1943; Dubai, Trucial States
- Died: 4 January 2006 (aged 62); Gold Coast, Queensland, Australia
- Spouse: Alia bint Khalifa Al Maktoum (m. 1971): Bouchra bint Mohammad
- Issue: Hessa; Maitha; Saeed; Rashid; Lateefa; Mohammed; Hamdan; Zayed
Names
- His Highness Sheikh Maktoum bin Rashid bin Saeed bin Maktoum bin Hasher bin Maktoum bin Butti bin Suhail Al Maktoum
- House: Al Maktoum
- Father: Rashid bin Saeed Al Maktoum
- Mother: Latifa bint Hamdan Al Nahyan
- Religion: Sunni Islam

Sheikh Maktoum bin Rashid Al Maktoum (Arabic: مكتوم بن راشد آل مكتوم, romanized: Maktūm bin Rāšid Āl Maktūm; 15 August 1943 – 4 January 2006) was an Emirati royal and politician who served as the vice president, prime minister of the United Arab Emirates, and ruler of Dubai. He was prime minister from 1971 to 1979 and from 1990 to 2006. He served as the ruler of Dubai from 1990 to 2006. He was succeeded after his death by his brother Sheikh Mohammed as Ruler of Dubai.

== Early life ==
He was born in 1943 in Al Shindagha, Dubai to the Al Maktoum family of the Al Bu Falasah tribe.

== Political career ==
His father Sheikh Rashid bin Saeed Al Maktoum became the Ruler of Dubai upon the death of his own father, Sheikh Saeed bin Maktoum bin Hasher Al Maktoum (Saeed II), in 1958. Sheikh Maktoum formed the first cabinet of the United Arab Emirates. He served as prime minister first from the country's independence on 9 December 1971 until 25 April 1979, when he was replaced by his father, who had been Vice President since 1971. Following his father's death on 7 October 1990, he resumed his position as Prime Minister of the United Arab Emirates, and also took over as Ruler of Dubai and Vice President of the United Arab Emirates. He served in all three positions until his death on 4 January 2006.

Sheikh Maktoum also briefly served as acting President of the United Arab Emirates on 2–3 November 2004 between the death of Sheikh Zayed bin Sultan Al Nahyan and the proclamation and installation of his son Sheikh Khalifa bin Zayed Al Nahyan as President of the United Arab Emirates on 4 November 2004.

Sheikh Maktoum ran the emirate of Dubai along with his two brothers, Sheikh Mohammed (Crown Prince and Minister of Defence) and Sheikh Hamdan (Minister of Finance) of the United Arab Emirates. Internationally, he was also known as co-owner (with his brothers) of Dubai's Godolphin Stables, which competes in major horse races around the world.

== Death ==
Sheikh Maktoum bin Rashid al Maktoum died on the morning of 4 January 2006, suffering a heart attack while staying at Palazzo Versace Hotel in Gold Coast, Queensland, Australia. He was succeeded by his brother, Sheikh Mohammed bin Rashid Al Maktoum, as ruler of Dubai. His body was brought back from Australia and buried in Dubai.

== Personal life ==
Sheikha Alia bint Khalifa Al Maktoum was Al Maktoum's wife until his death in 2006. They married on 12 March 1971. Sheikha Alia, like other members of the Maktoum family, is involved in horse racing.

One of Al Maktoum's daughters with Alia bint Khalifa bin Saeed Al Maktoum, is Lateefa bint Maktoum Al Maktoum (born 11 February 1985). Sheikha Lateefa bint Maktoum is the founder of the art centre Tashkeel Dubai. Sheikha Alia's other children are Sheikha Hessa, Sheikha Maitha, Sheikh Saeed, and Sheikh Rashid (1979–2002).

=== Sheikha Bouchra ===
Sheikha Bouchra bint Mohammed was Al Maktoum's second wife and had three sons named Sheikh Mohammed, Sheikh Hamdan, and Sheikh Zayed with him. She was a hobbyist painter and a horse racing enthusiast. Bouchra's lifestyle conflicted with the traditional customs and strictures on female royalty in the UAE. In April 2000, there were allegations that Bouchra had been abducted by the Emirati government while she was in the United Kingdom, forcefully bringing her to Dubai where she was made a house prisoner. She apparently died in 2007, aged 34, not long after her husband's death.

== See also ==
- Timeline of Dubai
- List of national leaders

Preceded by Zayed bin Sultan Al Nahyan	President of the UAE (acting); 2004	Succeeded by Khalifa bin Zayed Al Nahyan
Preceded by -	Prime Minister of the United Arab Emirates; 1971–1979	Succeeded by Rashid bin Said al-Maktoum
Preceded by Rashid bin Said al-Maktoum	Prime Minister of the United Arab Emirates; 1990–2006	Succeeded by Mohammed bin Rashid Al Maktoum
Preceded by Rashid bin Said al-Maktoum	Ruler of Dubai; 1990–2006	Succeeded by Mohammed bin Rashid Al Maktoum
