= Federal government of the United Arab Emirates =

United Arab Emirates Federal Government
- الحكومة الاتحادية لدولة الإمارات العربية المتحدة
- Coat of arms
- Formation: 2 December 1971; 54 years ago
- Founding document: United Arab Emirates Constitution
- Jurisdiction: United Arab Emirates
- Website: u.ae

Legislative branch
- Legislature: Federal Supreme Council
- Meeting place: Abu Dhabi

Executive branch
- Leader: Prime Minister
- Appointer: President of the United Arab Emirates
- Headquarters: Qasr Al Watan
- Main organ: Council of Ministers

Judicial branch
- Court: Federal Supreme Court of the United Arab Emirates

The United Arab Emirates Federal Government (UAE government) (Note: (Arabic: حكومة دولة الامارات الاتحادية) or (Arabic: حكومة دولة الامارات)) is the national government of the United Arab Emirates, a federation of seven self-governing emirates.

The UAE federal government is composed of three distinct branches: legislative, executive, and judicial. The powers of these branches are defined and vested by the UAE Constitution continuously since 2 December 1971. Article 120 of the UAE Constitution grants the federal government its mandate and outlines its jurisdictions.

The federal government shares sovereignty with each of the seven emirates in their respective territories. The Federal Supreme Council is the highest legislative body.

== History ==
The UAE federal government was formed on 2 December 1971, when the rulers of five emirates, formerly part of the Trucial States, established the United Arab Emirates. The UAE Constitution established the federal government and outlined its mandates and jurisdictions in Article 120 and Article 121. The constitution established key federal bodies, such as the Federal Supreme Council, which has supreme authority, a Federal National Council, Judiciary branch, and local governance. As part of the balance of powers between the Emirates, federal ministries were allocated based on representation, with the Emirate of Dubai maintaining Defence, Finance, and Economy. The Emirate of Abu Dhabi retained six cabinet posts, including Ministries of Interior and Foreign Affairs. Although not required in the constitution, by convention, the ruler of Abu Dhabi has always assumed the position of president and the ruler of Dubai always held the position of prime minister, except for the period between 1971 and 1979, when the crown prince of Dubai at the time, Maktoum bin Rashid Al Maktoum, held the position while his father was the ruler of Dubai and vice president.

== Federal Supreme Council ==
The constitution defines the Federal Supreme Council as the main legislative and executive arm of the federal government alongside the consultative Federal National Council.

The Federal Supreme Council is one of the five federal bodies described in the Constitution, and the highest constitutional authority of the federal government.

Every five years the Council votes and selects the president and vice president, confirms the appointment of the prime minister, and approves or rejects federal laws. Membership of the Council consists of the rulers of each of the emirates, with the Emirate of Abu Dhabi and the Emirate of Dubai holding exclusive veto rights.

== Federal National Council ==
The Federal National Council (the FNC) is one of the five federal bodies of the UAE, and is the consultative parliamentary organ of the federal government. The 40-member council consists of 20 members appointed by the rulers of each emirate and 20 members chosen by a selected electoral college.

Since 2019 there is a 50% gender quota, 50 percent of the seats must be occupied by Emirati women.

The FNC reviews laws, has the authority to question federal ministers, and reviews and examines the federal budget. They also provide suggestions to government bodies.

== Executive branch ==
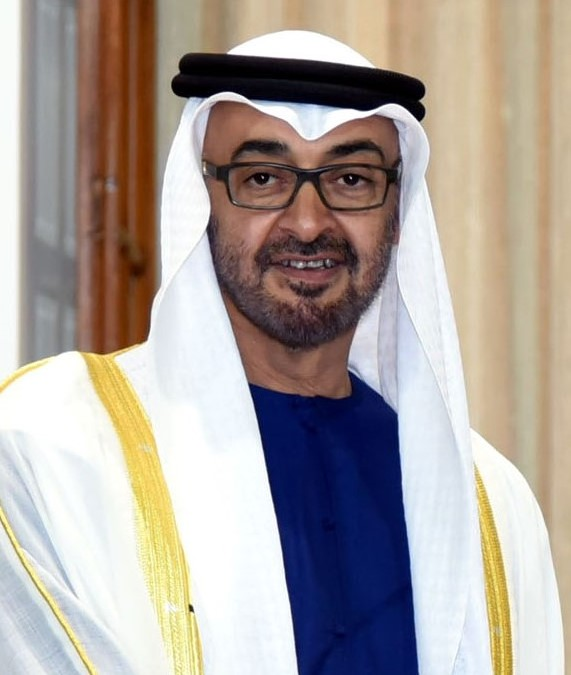
Mohamed bin Zayed Al Nahyan
President since 2022

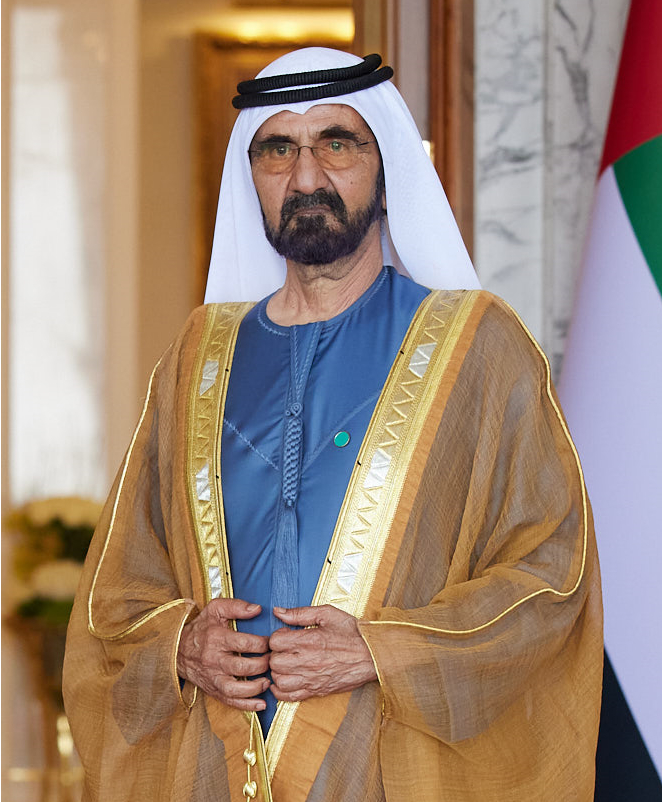
Mohammed bin Rashid Al Maktoum
Prime Minister and
Vice President since 2006

The executive branch of the federal government consists of the president, vice president, and the Cabinet.

=== President ===
The president holds wide-ranging powers including the authority to issue decrees for federal laws, consult with the prime minister on the appointment of federal ministers or heads of federal authorities and acts as supreme commander of the United Arab Emirates Armed Forces. The president nominates the prime minister and judges for the Federal Supreme Court; as head of the Federal Supreme Council, the president can call meetings and set policy agendas in addition to exclusive authority over foreign affairs.

=== Prime Minister and Cabinet of the UAE ===
The prime minister is the head of government and leads the Cabinet. The Cabinet interprets federal law and issues resolutions to federal ministries and agencies on how to enforce the laws. The federal government has 52 federal ministries and bodies under its supervision, who have varying jurisdiction based on agreements with local governments; federal bodies such as Emirates Post, and the Telecommunications Regulatory Authority have national jurisdiction.

== Local governments ==
The Constitution allows each emirate major autonomy on various aspects of local governance, and the right to request the federal government to manage some of those areas of autonomy. Each emirate interprets federal law independently and has the right to issue its own guidelines and laws, and thus laws and procedures can differ greatly between various local governments. Each local government has its own ruler, and executive council which manages the day-to-day affairs of the emirate.

Jurisdiction and scope of local governments vary widely between emirates, with the emirates of Dubai and Abu Dhabi maintaining independent energy, judicial, and religious affairs departments, while others, such as the Emirate of Umm Al Quwain maintaining only municipal and economic policy affairs, with other aspects such as energy, water management, religious affairs, and health are delegated to the federal government.
