= 2026 in the United Arab Emirates =

- Decades: 2000s; 2010s; 2020s
- See also: Other events of 2026; Timeline of Emirati history

Events in the year 2026 in the United Arab Emirates.

== Events ==
=== January ===
- January 12 – Somalia revokes all bilateral agreements with the UAE, citing violations of its sovereignty.
- January 13 – The Philippines and the UAE sign a Comprehensive Economic Partnership Agreement.
- January 23–24 – First round of the Trilateral negotiations involving the United States, Ukraine and Russia to end the Russo-Ukrainian war are held in Abu Dhabi.

=== February ===
- February 7 – PFL Champions Series 5
- February 8 – A man accused of shooting and injuring Russian general Vladimir Alexeyev in Moscow on 6 February is arrested in Dubai.
- February 13 – Sultan Ahmed bin Sulayem resigns as chair and CEO of DP World after being named in the Epstein files.
- February 28 –
  - In retaliation for the 2026 Israeli–United States strikes on Iran, Iran launches missiles at surrounding countries, including the UAE, killing a person in Abu Dhabi.
  - Iran launches a ballistic missile attack on Dubai, damaging a hotel on the Palm Islands and injuring at least four people. The Burj Khalifa is evacuated.

=== March ===
- March 1 – Multiple Iranian Shahed drones strike the French naval air station at Camp de la Paix in Abu Dhabi.
- March 3 –
  - An Iranian drone strike damages Al Minhad Air Base, the headquarters of the Australian Defence Force's Joint Task Force 633. Australian defence minister Richard Marles confirms that there were no casualties in the strike.
  - A large fire is reported at an oil terminal in Fujairah, following an Iranian Shahed drone attack.
  - France deploys Rafale fighter jets to the UAE in response to Iranian attacks.
  - The US Consulate in Al Seef, Dubai is set on fire by a drone attack.
- March 4 – Several stock exchanges resume, including Nasdaq Dubai, Dubai Financial Market, and Abu Dhabi Securities Exchange, after being put on pause for two days.
- March 5 – The UAE’s air defence systems intercept six ballistic missiles and 125 drones launched by Iran.
- March 7 – Dubai International Airport suspends operations after an aerial interception near the airport during Iranian drone and missile attacks in the region. Airport operations later partially resume as the UAE continues responding to the aerial threats. On the same day, debris from aerial interceptions hit the façade of a tower in Dubai Marina and kill an Asian national after debris hits a vehicle.
- March 9 – A helicopter of the United Arab Emirates Armed Forces crashes at an undisclosed location after a technical malfunction, killing at least two people.
- March 10 – The Ruwais refinery in Al Dhannah, Abu Dhabi Emirate, shuts down after a drone strike that causes a fire.
- March 14 – The Port of Fujairah suffers a drone attack.
- March 16 – Iran launches drone attacks on the UAE, killing a Palestinian man in Abu Dhabi and forcing the temporary closure of Dubai International Airport.
- March 17 – An oil tanker near Fujairah is struck by an unknown projectile. The Shah gas field also suspends operations.
- March 25 – Gold prices in Dubai rise after a 15-day drop amidst potential diplomacy to end the Iran war.
- 27 March – Kuwait, Saudi Arabia and the UAE report that they have intercepted missile and drone attacks.
- 28 March –
  - The 30th Dubai World Cup is held in Dubai.
  - Iran said that it targeted a Ukrainian anti-drone system depot in Dubai which it said was used to assist American forces.
  - Emirates Global Aluminium reports that one of its facilities in Abu Dhabi sustained significant damage and several injuries during missile and drone attacks attributed to Iran.

=== April ===
- 1 April – A Bangladeshi national is killed by shrapnel during a drone interception in Fujairah.
- 2 April –
  - Global investment management firm Hillhouse Investment opens a new office in the Abu Dhabi Global Market, making it one of the first companies to push ahead with a base since the war started on February 28.
  - Minor damage is reported near the Kizad area in Abu Dhabi after air defenses successfully intercept a missile.
- 3 April –
  - The UAE intercepts 18 ballistic missiles, four cruise missiles, and 47 drones from Iran.
  - The Maltese-flagged CMA CGM Kribi, a container ship registered by French shipping company CMA CGM, crosses the Strait of Hormuz after departing Dubai, making it the first ship from Western Europe to cross the strait since the war started.
- 5 April – The UAE declares its willingness to join a U.S.-led international coalition to secure and reopen the Strait of Hormuz, which has been blocked by Iran.
- 6 April – Debris from a missile defense system falls on a Raneen Systems building in Mussafah, injuring a Ghanaian citizen.
- 7 April – Two Pakistani nationals are injured when a building of the Thuraya company is struck by an Iranian ballistic missile in the Emirate of Sharjah.
- 15 April – Daniel Kinahan, the suspected leader of the Ireland-based Kinahan Organised Crime Group, is arrested in Dubai. He is extradited to Ireland on 9 August.
- 20 April – Authorities announce the arrest of 27 members of an Iranian-linked "terrorist" cell.
- 28 April – The UAE announces its withdrawal from OPEC effective 1 May.

=== May ===
- 17 May – A drone strike is carried out in the vicinity of the Barakah nuclear power plant.

=== July ===
- 24 July – The United States imposes a 12.5% tariff on the UAE, citing the presence of alleged forced labour in the supply chain.
- 25 July – Wadi Wurayah is designated as a UNESCO World Heritage Site.

=== August ===
- 10 August – The UAE states that it repelled attacks targeting aviation, energy and education fields.
- 18 August – The UAE states that Iran fired two missile towards it, adding that one landed inside its territorial waters. The UAE then halts all trade, exchange, and financial transactions with Iran until further notice. Iran denies that it launched missiles towards the UAE, citing a "false flag" operation.
- 20 August – The United States cuts off all Banque Misr's UAE branches from dollar transactions due to its dealings with Iran.

=== September ===
- 4 September – President Mohamed bin Zayed Al Nahyan pardons an Egyptian-Turkish poet who was sentenced to a decade in prison following his criticism of the UAE, Saudi Arabia, and Egyptian authorities in an online video.
- 10 September – Algeria severs diplomatic relations with the UAE, citing unspecified "provocative or hostile" acts.
- 23 September – The Central Bank of the United Arab Emirates bans Bank Melli Iran from the operating in the country, citing regulations noncompliance.
- 24 September – The General Civil Aviation Authority announces that Iranian airlines' flights to and from the country had been halted until further notice, citing US sanctions placed on Iranian airlines for using airports across the world.
- 30 September – flydubai suspends flights to and from Israel amid an investigation into the attempted hijacking of Flydubai Flight 1073.

=== October ===
- 3 October – A group of Iranian detainees are freed by the UAE.
- 5 October – The Trump administration authorizes a $1 billion munitions sale to the country of up to 10,000 Advanced Precision Kill Weapon Systems.
- 28 October – A federal court in Abu Dhabi sentences eight Sudanese nationals, including Yasser al-Atta, to life imprisonment for arms trafficking and money laundering to the Sudanese Armed Forces.

=== November ===
- 12 November – At least 14 people are killed and 30 others wounded in a large traffic accident involving 18 cars and five trucks in the Emirate of Fujairah.
- 19 November – Somalia expels the UAE ambassador, accusing the UAE of supporting armed forces outside of federal jurisdiction and undermining its unity.

== Holidays ==
- January 1 – New Year's Day
- March 19 – 22 – Eid al-Fitr
- May 26 – Day of Arafat
- May 27–29 – Eid al-Adha
- June 16 – Islamic New Year
- August 25 – The Prophet's Birthday
- December 1 – Commemoration Day
- December 2 – National Day

== Deaths ==
- 21 September – Ahmed bin Rashid Al Maktoum, 76, public official
