= 2025 in the United Arab Emirates =

- Decades: 2000s; 2010s; 2020s
- See also: Other events of 2025; Timeline of Emirati history

Events in the year 2025 in the United Arab Emirates.

== Incumbents ==
Photo	Post	Name
	President of the United Arab Emirates	Mohamed bin Zayed Al Nahyan
	Prime Minister of the United Arab Emirates	Mohammed bin Rashid Al Maktoum

== Events ==
=== January ===
- 14 January – Malaysia and the UAE sign a Comprehensive Economic Partnership Agreement.

=== February ===
- 17 February – Ukraine and the UAE sign a Comprehensive Economic Partnership Agreement.

=== March ===
- 6 March – The Central African Republic and the UAE sign a Comprehensive Economic Partnership Agreement.
- 31 March – The Abu Dhabi Federal Court of Appeals’ State Security Chamber sentences three people to death and a fourth person to life imprisonment for the killing of Israeli-Moldovan rabbi Zvi Kogan in November 2024.

=== April ===
- 2 April – The Comprehensive Economic Partnership Agreement with Costa Rica, Mauritius, and the United Arab Emirates comes into force.
- 9 April – The Republic of Congo and the UAE sign a Comprehensive Economic Partnership Agreement.
- 30 April – The UAE says it had intercepted millions of rounds of ammunition at an airport intended for the Sudanese Armed Forces.

=== May ===
- 3 May – Clashes break out at a UAE Pro League between Al Wasl F.C. and Shabab Al Ahli Club in Dubai, resulting in several arrests.
- 5 May – The International Court of Justice dismisses a case filed by Sudan accusing the UAE of genocide for its support of the Rapid Support Forces during the Sudanese civil war (2023–present), citing lack of authority to continue the proceedings.
- 6 May – Sudan army-led government cuts diplomatic relations with the UAE over alleged support for the Rapid Support Forces. The UAE replies that it does not recognise a decision by Sudan's army-affiliated defence council to sever ties.
- 22 May – G42, OpenAI, Oracle, NVIDIA, SoftBank Group and Cisco announce a partnership to build Stargate UAE.
- 31 May – Comprehensive Economic Partnership Agreement between Serbia and the United Arab Emirates comes into force.

=== June ===
- 10 June – The European Union removes the UAE from its list of high risk jurisdictions for money laundering and terrorism financing.
- 17 June – The oil tanker ADALYNN collides with another vessel off the coast of Khor Fakkan, resulting in the evacuation of 24 crew.

=== July ===
- 10 July – Azerbaijani president Ilham Aliyev meets with Armenian prime minister Nikol Pashinyan in Abu Dhabi as part of peace negotiations between their countries hosted by the UAE.
- 11 July – The Faya Palaeolandscape in Sharjah Emirate is designated as a World Heritage Site by UNESCO.
- 31 July – Israel evacuates most of its diplomatic staff in the United Arab Emirates, including its ambassador, due to concerns of retaliatory targeting after the Twelve-Day War.

=== August ===
- 4 August – Moldova and the UAE sign memorandum of understanding on the mutual exemption of entry visa.
- 6 August – The UAE bans Sudanese airliners from the country.
- 25 August – Angola and the UAE sign a Comprehensive Economic Partnership Agreement.
- 27 August – The Comprehensive Economic Partnership Agreement between New Zealand and the UAE enters into force.

=== October ===
- 9–15 October – IUCN World Conservation Congress 2025 in Abu Dhabi.

=== November ===
- 17–21 November – 2025 Dubai Airshow in Al Maktoum Airport.
- 21 November – An HAL Tejas fighter aircraft of the Indian Air Force crashes while performing a stunt at the Dubai Airshow, killing the pilot.

=== December ===
- 18 December – A major rainstorm hits Dubai, causing flooding in the city.
- 30 December – The UAE announces that it would withdraw its remaining security personnel from Yemen following an ultimatum from Saudi Arabia and the Yemeni Presidential Leadership Council to end its support for southern separatists.

== Holidays ==
- January 1 – New Year's Day
- March 29–31 – Eid al-Fitr
- June 5 – Day of Arafat
- June 6–8 – Eid al-Adha
- June 26 – Islamic New Year
- September 4 – The Prophet's Birthday
- December 1 – Commemoration Day
- December 2 – National Day
