= 2014 in the United Arab Emirates =

- Decades: 1990s; 2000s; 2010s; 2020s
- See also: Other events of 2014; Timeline of Emirati history

The following lists events that happened during 2014 in the United Arab Emirates.

== Incumbents ==
- President: Khalifa bin Zayed Al Nahyan
- Prime Minister: Mohammed bin Rashid Al Maktoum

== Events ==
=== January ===
- January 19 - Sheikh Mohammed Bin Rashid Al Maktoum, Prime Minister and Vice President of the United Arab Emirates announces mandatory military service for males aged 18-30.

=== May ===
- May 1 - The UAE International Award for Poets of Peace is established.

=== June ===
- June 20 - Miss India Worldwide 2014 takes place at Al Raha Beach Resort, Abu Dhabi.

=== July ===
- July 2 - Former British prime minister Tony Blair agrees to become Egyptian president Abdel Fattah el-Sisi's economic adviser as part of a program funded by the United Arab Emirates.

=== August ===
- August 25 - Twice in the previous seven days, Egypt and the United Arab Emirates secretly cooperated to launch airstrikes against Islamist-allied militants in Libya battling for control of Tripoli according to senior American officials.

=== November ===
- November 11 - The Dubai Tram begins operation.
- November 18 - Yas Mall opens.
- November 29 - In an effort to make the UAE a world leader in innovation, the UAE Cabinet approved the designation of 2015 as the Year of Innovation.

=== December ===
- December 1 - Ibolya Ryan, a Hungarian-American kindergarten teacher, is murdered in Abu Dhabi.

== Holidays ==
- January 1 – New Year's Day
- January 13 – The Prophet's Birthday
- August 3 – Eid al-Fitr
- October 3 – Day of Arafat
- October 9– Eid al-Adha
- October 27 – Islamic New Year
- December 2 – National Day
