= 2021 in the United Arab Emirates =

- Decades: 2000s; 2010s; 2020s
- See also: Other events of 2021; Timeline of Emirati history

Events in the year 2021 in the United Arab Emirates.

== Incumbents ==
- President: Khalifa bin Zayed Al Nahyan
- Prime Minister: Mohammed bin Rashid Al Maktoum

== Events ==
=== January ===
- 24 January:
  - The cabinet of the United Arab Emirates approves the establishment of an embassy in Tel Aviv.
  - Israel opens an embassy in the United Arab Emirates, appointing Eitan Na'eh as head of the envoy. It will be in a temporary office, until a permanent location will be set up.

=== June ===
- 11 June — During the 2021 United Nations Security Council Elections, the United Arab Emirates was elected to serve a two-year term as a non-permanent member of the United Nations Security Council. It marked the second time the UAE has sat on the Security Council.

=== July ===
- The Hope probe, launched on 19 July 2020, went into orbit around Mars on 9 February 2021. It was launched as a part of the Emirates Mars Mission is a United Arab Emirates Space Agency uncrewed space exploration mission to Mars.

=== October ===
- 1 October - The Dubai World Expo 2020. Delayed from 2020 to 2021 due to Covid-19 restrictions.
- 15 October - IPL 2021 was hosted across Abu Dhabi, Dubai and Sharjah.

=== December ===
- 12 December – Max Verstappen wins the Abu Dhabi Grand Prix and the Championship against Lewis Hamilton.
- 13 December – Prime Minister of Israel Naftali Bennett and Sheikh Mohamed bin Zayed Al Nahyan discuss strengthening bilateral trade and cooperation in multiple areas, at the first meeting of the leaders of the two countries.

== Deaths ==
- 24 March - Hamdan bin Rashid Al Maktoum, politician (b. 1945)
- 18 April - Abdullah Al-Nauri, novelist (b. 1959)
- 19 June - Alaa al-Siddiq, human rights activist (b. 1988)
- 17 December - Majid Al Futtaim, businessman (b. 1934)
