= 2027 in the United Arab Emirates =

- Decades: 2000s; 2010s; 2020s
- See also: Other events of 2027; Timeline of Emirati history

Events in the year 2027 in the United Arab Emirates.

== Events ==
=== Predicted and scheduled ===
- By October – 2027 Emirati parliamentary election

== Holidays ==
- January 1 – New Year's Day
- March 9 – 11 – Eid al-Fitr
- May 15 – Day of Arafat
- May 16–18 – Eid al-Adha
- June 6 – Islamic New Year
- August 14 – The Prophet's Birthday
- December 2 – National Day
