= 2007 in the United Arab Emirates =

- Decades: 1980s; 1990s; 2000s; 2010s; 2020s
- See also: Other events of 2007; Timeline of Emirati history

Events from the year 2007 in the United Arab Emirates.

== Incumbents ==
- President: Khalifa bin Zayed Al Nahyan
- Prime Minister: Mohammed bin Rashid Al Maktoum

== Events ==
=== March ===
- March 8 – The short film 100 Miles is released.

=== May ===
- May 13 - President of Iran Mahmoud Ahmadinejad visits the United Arab Emirates for the first official visit since 1979.

=== August ===
- August 27 - A fire breaks out at the Jebel Ali port triggering explosions at a chemical storage depot.

=== September ===
- September 12 - Burj Dubai reaches 555.3 metres, surpassing the 553.3 metre CN Tower in Toronto, Ontario Canada as the world's tallest free-standing structure on land, which it had been since 1976. The building is due for completion 2008 with a final projected height of 818 metres.

=== November ===
- November 1 - Benazir Bhutto leaves Karachi for United Arab Emirates amidst speculations that Pakistani President Pervez Musharraf might impose martial law in Pakistan.
- November 8 - At least seven construction workers are killed and 15 others injured when a bridge under construction collapses in Dubai.
- November 12 - Airbus and Boeing both win a giant order of 100 planes from Dubai Aerospace Enterprise, an Emirati jet leasing corporation.
