= 2024 in the United Arab Emirates =

- Decades: 2000s; 2010s; 2020s
- See also: Other events of 2024; Timeline of Emirati history

Events in the year 2024 in the United Arab Emirates.

== Incumbents ==
Photo	Post	Name
	President of the United Arab Emirates	Mohamed bin Zayed Al Nahyan
	Prime Minister of the United Arab Emirates	Mohammed bin Rashid Al Maktoum

== Events ==
=== January ===
- 1 January – The United Arab Emirates formally joins the BRICS group.
- 1 January – Turkey permits visa free travel for Emirati citizens.

=== February ===
- 14 February - Indian Prime Minister Narendra Modi inaugurates the BAPS Hindu Mandir, the first Hindu temple in Abu Dhabi.
- 22 February - United Kingdom opens Electronic Travel Authorization for Emirati citizens.
- 23 February - The Financial Action Task Force removes the UAE from its "gray list" of countries not fully complying with measures to combat money laundering and terrorism financing.

=== April ===
- 4 April - Five people are killed in a fire at a residential building in Sharjah.
- 16 April - Heavy rains cause floods in multiple areas in the United Arab Emirates. The National Center for Meteorology records the country's heaviest rainfall in 75 years. At least four people are reported killed.
- 26 April - The United Arab Emirates plans to seek bids for a second nuclear power plant.

=== May ===
- 1 May – Al Ain's ruler Tahnoun bin Mohammed Al Nahyan dies at the age of 82.

=== June ===
- 19 June – Sudan's UN envoy accuses the United Arab Emirates at the United Nations Security Council of arming the Rapid Support Forces in the Sudanese civil war (2023-present). The United Arab Emirates rejects the accusations as fabrications to mislead the international community.
- 26 June – United Arab Emirates and Cambodia Comprehensive Economic Partnership Agreement (CEPA) enters into force.

=== July ===
- 10 July – The Federal Court of Appeal sentences 43 people, including several human rights activists, to life imprisonment in a mass trial on charges of plotting acts of violence and destabilisation.
- 21 July – Fifty-seven Bangladeshi expatriates are sentenced to varying prison terms for holding protests in support of the 2024 Bangladesh quota reform movement. They are later pardoned by UAE president Mohamed bin Zayed Al Nahyan on 3 September.
- 29 July – The United Arab Emirates grants lottery licenses for the first time in its history.

=== August ===
- 21 August – The United Arab Emirates accepts the credentials of Badruddin Haqqani as ambassador of the Taliban-led Islamic Emirate of Afghanistan.

=== September ===
- 23 September – The United Arab Emirates becomes the second country after India to be designated as a "major defense partner" by the United States.
- 24 September – Four soldiers are killed and nine injured after an accident while transporting ammunition in the UAE.
- 29 September – The residence of the UAE's ambassador to Sudan is bombed in Khartoum, with the UAE accusing the Sudanese Armed Forces of launching an airstrike and the latter blaming the Rapid Support Forces for the incident.

=== October ===
- 31 October – United States Customs and Border Protection admits Emirati citizens into Global Entry program.

=== November ===
- 6 November – The UAE and Australia sign a Comprehensive Economic Partnership Agreement (CEPA).
- 17 November – Stocks listed in the United Arab Emirates top $1 trillion USD for the first time.
- 24 November – Zvi Kogan, an Israeli-Moldovan rabbi working for Chabad, is found killed after being reported missing in Dubai on 21 November. The Israeli government attributes his death as motivated by anti-Semitism.

=== December ===
- 3 December – United Arab Emirates foreign aid reach AED 360 billion ($98 billion) since its establishment in 1971.
- 26 December – A light aircraft crashes off the coast of Ras Al Khaimah, killing the pilot and her sole companion.

== Holidays ==
- January 1 – New Year's Day
- April 10 – Eid al-Fitr
- June 15 – Day of Arafat
- June 16–17 – Eid al-Adha
- July 7 – Islamic New Year
- September 16– The Prophet's Birthday
- December 1 – Commemoration Day
- December 2 – National Day
