= Embassy of the United Arab Emirates, Tel Aviv =

Embassy of the United Arab Emirates in Tel Aviv
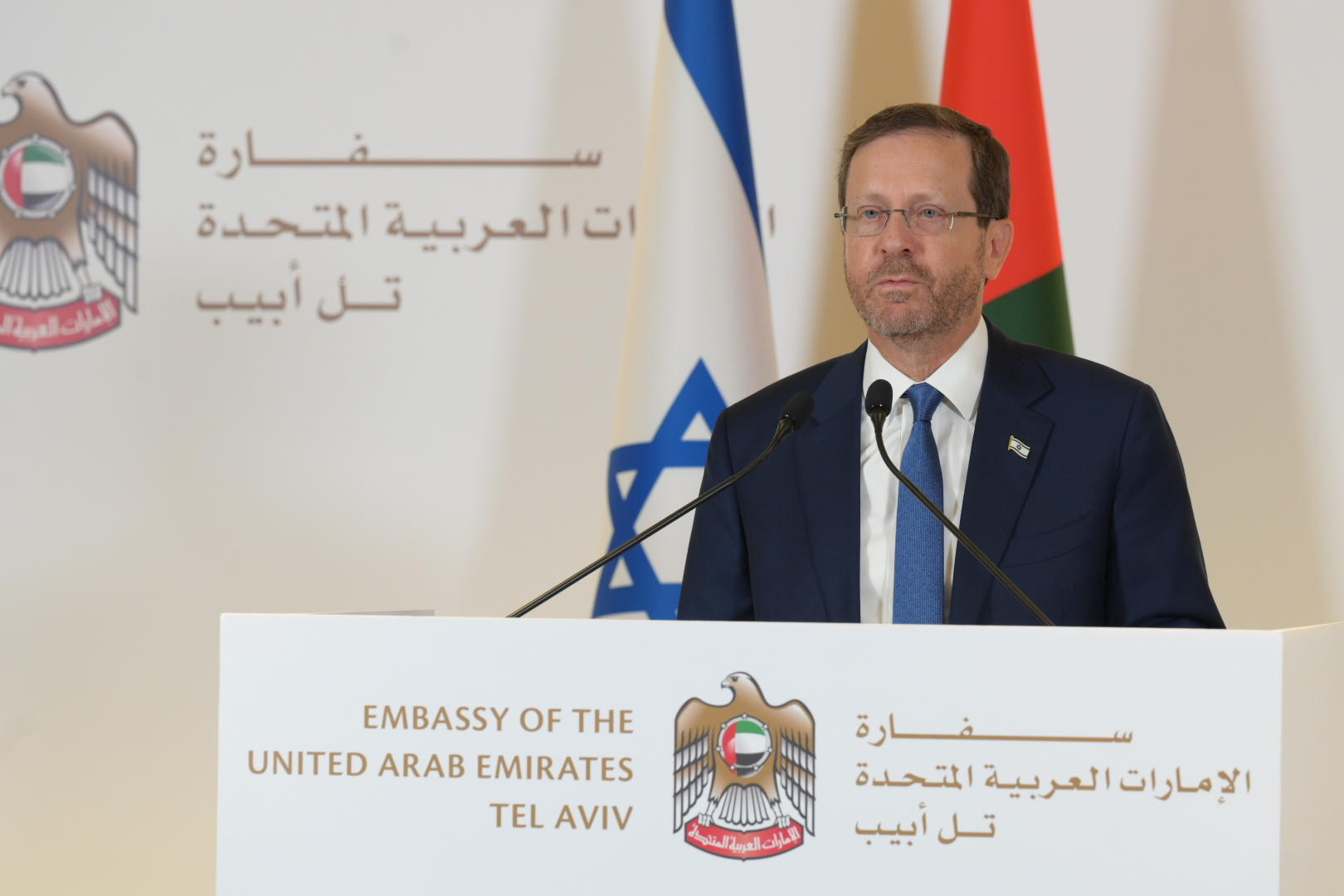
- Location: Herzliya, Israel
- Address: Arieh Shenkar St. 11, Herzliya
- Opening: January 3, 2021
- Ambassador: Mohamed Al Khaja
- Website: www.mofa.gov.ae/en/missions/tel-aviv

The Embassy of the United Arab Emirates in Tel Aviv is the diplomatic mission of the United Arab Emirates to Israel. It was opened following normalization between the two countries due to the Abraham Accords. In 2025, the UAE purchased land in Tel Aviv for a permanent embassy, in the place of rented facilities that it had used up to that point.
