= 2017 in the United Arab Emirates =

- Decades: 1990s; 2000s; 2010s; 2020s
- See also: Other events of 2017; Timeline of Emirati history

Events in the year 2017 in the United Arab Emirates.

== Incumbents ==
- President: Khalifa bin Zayed Al Nahyan
- Prime Minister: Mohammed bin Rashid Al Maktoum

== Events ==
- 14-20 January – In the 2017 Desert T20 Challenge, hosted by the Emirates, the Afghanistan cricket team defeated Ireland in the final.
- 6-16 December – scheduled dates for the 2017 FIFA Club World Cup to be hosted by the Emirates

== Deaths ==
- 6 July – Giovanni Bernardo Gremoli, Roman Catholic prelate, Vicar Apostolic of Arabia (b. 1926).
- 11 July – Abdullah Hayayei, paralympic athlete (b. 1980)
