= 2012 in the United Arab Emirates =

- Decades: 1990s; 2000s; 2010s; 2020s
- See also: Other events of 2012; Timeline of Emirati history

Events from the year 2012 in the United Arab Emirates.

== Incumbents ==
- President: Khalifa bin Zayed Al Nahyan
- Prime Minister: Mohammed bin Rashid Al Maktoum

== Events ==
=== May ===
- May 23 - The Iranian navy assists an American cargo ship that was attacked by pirates off the United Arab Emirates.

=== July ===
- July 15 - Saudi Arabia and the United Arab Emirates open new pipelines bypassing the Strait of Hormuz, the shipping lane that Iran has repeatedly threatened to close.
- July 29 - Ten more Islamists are arrested in the United Arab Emirates as part of a crackdown on dissidents, according to activists.

=== August ===
- August 15 - Saudi Arabia, Qatar and the United Arab Emirates urge their citizens to leave Lebanon over a series of recent kidnappings involving nationals from Syria, Turkey and Saudi Arabia.
- August 18 – Cyril Karabus is arrested at Zayed International Airport on his manslaughter and forgery convictions in absentia almost a decade earlier.

== Sports ==
- 2012 Dubai Tennis Championships

== Establishments ==
- Careem
- Elite Residence
- Bab al-Qasr
