= Khaja (surname) =

Khaja or Al Khaja is a surname. Notable people with the surname include:

- Anna Khaja, American actress and playwright
- Mohamed Al Khaja (born 1980), Emirati diplomat
- Nagieb Khaja (born 1979), Danish journalist
- Nayla Al Khaja (born 1978), Emirati film writer, director and producer
