= 2004 in the United Arab Emirates =

- Decades: 1980s; 1990s; 2000s; 2010s; 2020s
- See also: Other events of 2004; Timeline of Emirati history

The following lists events that happened during 2004 in the United Arab Emirates.

== Incumbents ==
- President:
  - until 2 November: Zayed bin Sultan Al Nahyan
  - 2 November-3 November: Maktoum bin Rashid AL Maktoum (acting)
  - starting 3 November: Khalifa bin Zayed Al Nahyan
- Prime Minister: Maktoum bin Rashid Al Maktoum

== Events ==
=== January ===
- January 14 - A 45-year-old Sudanese man travelling from Washington Dulles International Airport to airport Dubai is arrested en route at London's Heathrow Airport on suspicion of carrying five bullets in his coat pocket.

=== February ===
- February 10 - At least 35 die when an Iranian airliner crashes on arrival at Sharjah airport.

== Establishments ==
- British University in Dubai.

== Deaths ==
- November 2 - Zayed bin Sultan Al Nahyan.
