= 2018 in the United Arab Emirates =

- Decades: 1990s; 2000s; 2010s; 2020s
- See also: Other events of 2018; Timeline of Emirati history

Events in the year 2018 in the United Arab Emirates.

== Incumbents ==
- President: Khalifa bin Zayed Al Nahyan
- Prime Minister: Mohammed bin Rashid Al Maktoum

== Events ==
- 25 January - Dubai sheikha Latifa bint Mohammed Al Maktoum escapes from the UAE with some associates. They are arrested by Indian Navy and Coast guard in the Arabian sea, near the coast of India, and are taken back to the UAE.
- 30 April - The UAE takes over the Yemeni archipelago Socotra for 2 weeks.
- 5 May - Briton Matthew Hedges is arrested in the United Arab Emirates on suspicion of spying. He is later sentenced to life imprisonment.
- 22 June - 2018 Dubai Kabaddi Masters was an international kabaddi sporting event held in Dubai. This event also marks the first ever international kabaddi tournament to be held in the United Arab Emirates.
- 25 July - Iran-aligned Houthis in Yemen claim to have fired a drone at Abu Dhabi International Airport. The UAE denied any drone have reached the UAE and reported that the airport was running as usual.
- 28 September – The 2018 Asia Cup final between India and Bangladesh takes place in Dubai.
- 30 October – KhalifaSat, the first entirely Emirati-made satellite, is launched into orbit.

== Deaths ==
- 28 January – Hassa bint Mohammed bin Khalifa Al Nahyan, wife of UAE first president Sheikh Zayed bin Sultan Al Nahyan.
- 24 February – Indian actress Sridevi dies at the Jumeirah Emirates Towers Hotel in Dubai.
- 27 July – Ousha the Poet, poet (b. 1920).
