= Death of Lee Bradley Brown =

2011 death of a British tourist in a Dubai prison

Lee Bradley Brown
- Born: 18 June 1971; London, England
- Died: 12 April 2011 (aged 39); Bur Dubai police station, Dubai, United Arab Emirates
- Cause of death: Disputed
- Status: Deceased (died in police custody)
- Criminal charges: assaulting a Nepalese housekeeper at the Burj Al Arab hotel
- Penalty: None, held in police custody for six days

Lee Bradley Brown (18 June 1971 – 12 April 2011) was a British tourist who died in police custody in Dubai, United Arab Emirates. He was arrested by the Dubai Police Force after assaulting a Nepalese housekeeper at the Burj Al Arab hotel where he was staying. After being placed in solitary confinement, he was found dead in his cell six days after he was arrested. The circumstances surrounding his death remain disputed.

== Hotel incident ==
Lee Brown was born in East London on 18 June 1971. He was the third of four children to Doris and Vic Brown. After his family moved to Devon, he went to Kingsteignton Secondary School in Newton Abbot. He resided in Ilford, Essex at the time of his death. In April 2011, Brown took a holiday trip to Dubai, where he stayed at the Burj Al Arab hotel. According to the hotel staff, Brown requested housekeeping to his room and a Nepalese housekeeper was sent. Brown assaulted the housekeeper and attempted to throw her from the balcony. The housekeeper suffered injuries and bruises and had to seek medical treatment.

According to Essam Al Humaidan, the Dubai Public Prosecutor, hotel employees said they were met "violent resistance" when they intervened to prevent Brown from throwing the Nepalese maid off the balcony. According to Lieutenant General Dahi Khalfan Tamim, then the Dubai Chief of Police, Brown resisted arrest, banging his head against a wall and trying to throw himself from the hotel's balcony.

== Arrest and death ==
After Brown was arrested he was taken to Bur Dubai police station, officers said he continued to beat on the metal mesh barrier in the patrol car while he was being driven to the police station. He was charged with using abusive language and intimidating behaviour and was denied bail.

Shortly after his arrest, Brown was placed in a cell with other prisoners. Following an altercation with other prisoners he was moved to solitary confinement. According to other prisoners testimonials, Brown was behaving abnormally. He was shouting, swearing, claiming he was “the Muslim Jesus” and that he was abducted by aliens. Brown had taken down his trousers, referred to his genitals, and made rude and inappropriate remarks to the prosecutor. A prisoner said he heard guards say they have beaten Brown.

A European prisoner who shared a cell with Brown described Brown's condition as "terrible", but clarified he did not see him being beaten. The prisoner explained, "I saw him bleeding. He had bruises on his face, shoulder and arms when he asked me for help....he kept saying: ‘Please help me, please help me'." The European prisoner noted that "Brown was half naked with both his hands and legs in cuffs. He wore nothing on top … and no shoes… his pants were hanging well below the waist." The prisoner noted that Brown was not eating for 2 days, and asked the police to check on him. Dubai police noted that Brown had been vomiting the day before his death but added that Brown neither complained about nor sought medical help.

The UK Foreign Office confirmed Brown died in custody six days after his arrest, on 12 April 2011.

== Investigation and UK Inquest ==
Allegations that Brown was beaten by police originated from four British citizens who were being held at the same police station on charges unrelated to those of Brown. One of the British prisoners used a mobile phone to contact Brown's sister-in-law, Su, after he found her phone number as the next of kin contact in Brown's passport, which had been left in his cell. A preliminary post mortem report, based on an examination performed one week after Brown's death, stated "the death... was caused by suffocation as result of outflow of vomiting liquids into his respiratory tract," and noted that hashish was found in Brown's system through analysis of his blood and urine. The report of the Dubai authorities noted that Brown suffered irregular bruising on the left side of the forehead, as well as bruising on the nose and on the inner arm.

An examination of Brown's body by British officials one week later found no evidence that Brown had vomit in his airways. Another post-mortem examination was carried out ahead of the British inquest into his death by consultant pathologist, Dr Benjamin Swift in 2012, at the behest of Brown's family. Dr. Swift concluded that the finding about cannabis was "not relevant" – adding that the drug had not "caused or contributed to his death". However, Dr. Swift also discounted violent trauma as a possible cause of death, describing the bruising as "light".

An official inquest was conducted at Walthamstow Coroner's Court in East London, and this proceeding was attended by Brown's mother, Doris Shafi, his brother, Steven, and his sister-in-law Su Brown. Unusually, no witnesses were called and no other evidence other than the post mortem reports was permitted. No CCTV footage was released by the Dubai authorities, despite references to this footage in UAE press by the Chief of Police and others.

The coroner, Chinyere Inyama, rejected the efforts of barrister John Lofthouse, to draw attention away from the evidence by citing the conflicts between the forensic findings of Emirati and British officials, reminding him that his submissions bore no relevance to the inquest's role, which was limited to a determination of the cause of death. As such, the British coroner returned an open verdict, indicating that there was insufficient evidence to prove either an unlawful nor a natural cause of death, which effectively served to leave doubts about the circumstances of Lee Brown's death.

In 2013 The Independent reported that consultant pathologist, Dr Benjamin Swift, privately hired by Brown's family, had concluded that there was irrefutable evidence that Brown was under the influence of drugs at the time of the incident but that was irrelevant and would not have contributed to his death by asphyxiation on his own vomit. The article stated the finding "lends credibility to mounting claims about brutality towards prisoners in the emirate." However, the article did not mention that Dr. Swift had not ruled out the possibility that Brown sustained his life-threatening injuries while under the influence of the drugs, and even more pointedly, that Dr. Swift explicitly ruled out violent trauma as a possible cause of death. In November 2022, another inquest into the death of Brown (after his family had won the right to challenge the findings of the first one) heard that guards at the Bur Dubai police station had boasted about 'beating the shit out' of Brown. In response the UAE said these claims were based on 'unsubstantiated, third-hand, hearsay claims by former anonymous prison inmates' and the 'allegations were thoroughly investigated in 2011 by both UAE medical authorities and police".

== See also ==
- 2011 in the United Arab Emirates
- Britons in the United Arab Emirates
- List of unsolved deaths
- United Arab Emirates–United Kingdom relations
