= 2015 in the United Arab Emirates =

- Decades: 1990s; 2000s; 2010s; 2020s
- See also: Other events of 2015; Timeline of Emirati history

The following lists events that happened during 2015 in the United Arab Emirates.

== Incumbents ==
- President: Khalifa bin Zayed Al Nahyan
- Prime Minister: Mohammed bin Rashid Al Maktoum

== Events ==
=== January ===
- January 5 - After being grounded in Abu Dhabi for over 12 hours with all passengers on board, Etihad Airways Flight 183 completes its flight to San Francisco International Airport.
- February 13, 14 ,15- WWE comes to Abu Dhabi
- December 31 - A Fire broke out in The Address Downtown Dubai

== Sport ==
=== January ===
- January 27 - Australia wins 2–0 against United Arab Emirates to advance to the 2015 AFC Asian Cup Final for the second consecutive time.

=== October ===
- UAE hosted the inaugural Abu Dhabi Tour, a professional cycling race.

== Deaths ==
=== September ===
- September 19 - Rashid bin Mohammed Al Maktoum
