= 2020 in the United Arab Emirates =

- Decades: 2000s; 2010s; 2020s
- See also: Other events of 2020; Timeline of Emirati history

Events in the year 2020 in the United Arab Emirates.

== Incumbents ==
- President: Khalifa bin Zayed Al Nahyan
- Prime Minister: Mohammed bin Rashid Al Maktoum

== Events ==
- January 30 – The Emirati government reports the first positive case related to the COVID-19 pandemic in the United Arab Emirates.
- July 19 - The Hope probe was launched on 19 July 2020 under the Emirates Mars Mission, a United Arab Emirates Space Agency uncrewed space exploration mission to Mars.
- August 13 – Israel and the UAE agree to normalise relations, marking the third Israel–Arab peace deal.
- September 19 - 2020 Indian Premier League begins in UAE.
