= 2019 in the United Arab Emirates =

- Decades: 1990s; 2000s; 2010s; 2020s
- See also: Other events of 2019; Timeline of Emirati history

Events in the year 2019 in the United Arab Emirates.

== Incumbents ==
- President: Khalifa bin Zayed Al Nahyan
- Prime Minister: Mohammed bin Rashid Al Maktoum

== Events ==
- January 5 – 2019 AFC Asian Cup begins in the UAE.
- February 3 – Pope Francis makes a historic trip to Abu Dhabi. He, alongside Ahmed al-Tayeb, sign the Document on Human Fraternity.
- 14 March – 2019 Special Olympics World Summer Games begins in Abu Dhabi.
- 12 May – Four commercial ships were sabotaged off Fujairah's coast in the Gulf of Oman by a most likely "state actor", according to investigation.
- 5 October – 2019 Emirati parliamentary election for the Federal National Council starts.
- 25 September – Hazza Al Mansouri launch aboard the Soyuz MS-15 spacecraft to the International Space Station, becoming the first Emirati najmonaut.

== Deaths ==
- 4 May – Alia Abdulnoor, an Emirati convict incarcerated for terrorism financing for Al Qaeda, dies of breast cancer following pleas from human rights activists to release her.
