= Al Seef =

Waterfront promenade in Dubai

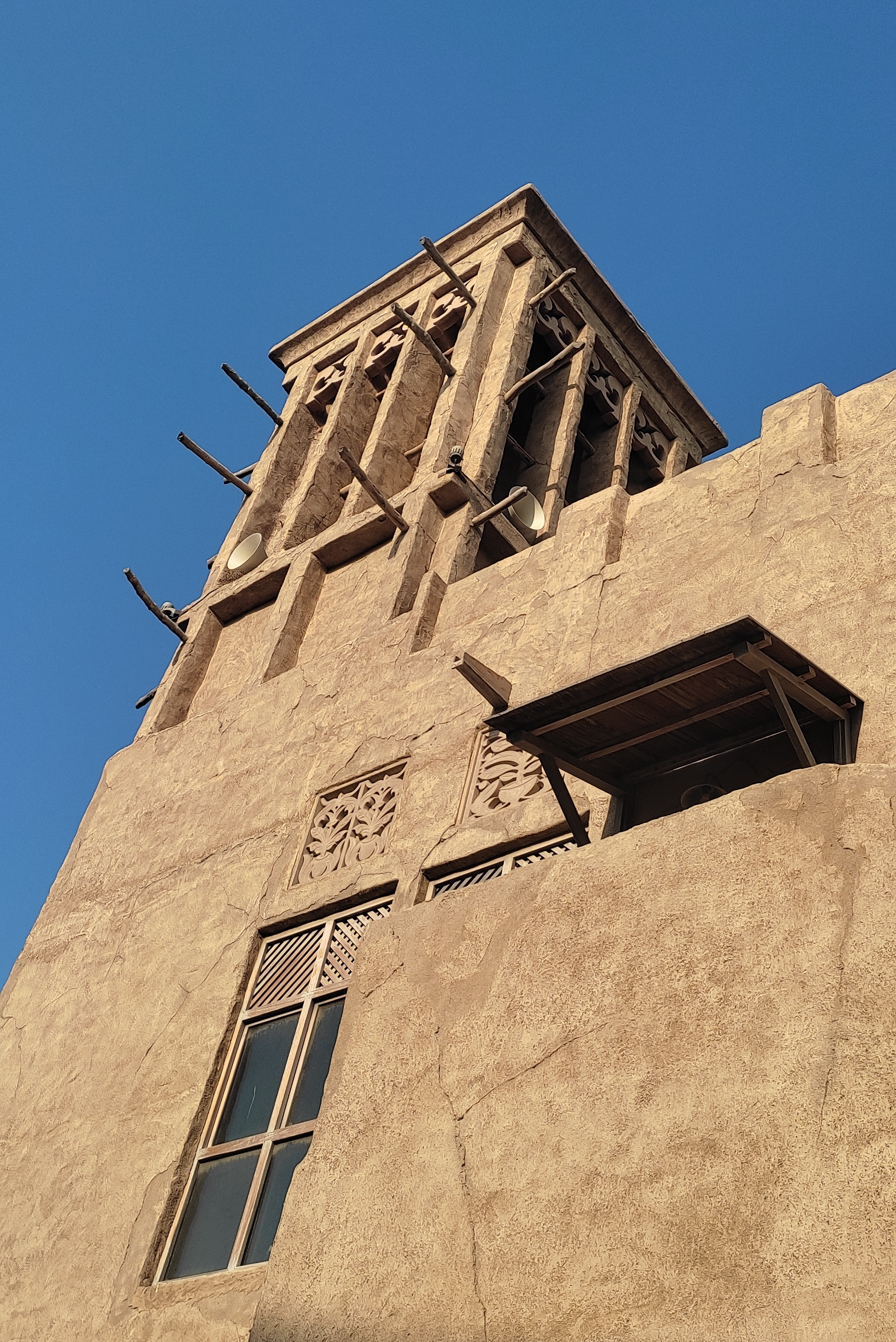
- A wind tower house in Al Seef (2022)
- Interactive map of Al Seef
- Location: Dubai, United Arab Emirates
- Coordinates: 25.265094538009727°N 55.30362401211394°E
- Groundbreaking: 2012
- Opening: 2017
- Use: Waterfront

Companies
- Developer: Meraas

Al Seef (Arabic: السيف, romanized: al sayf) or Al Seef Khor is a 1.8 km waterfront promenade along the bank of Dubai Creek in the Al Fahidi neighborhood of Dubai, United Arab Emirates.

== History ==
The promenade was developed by Dubai-based real estate company Meraas and its construction was completed in 2017.

== Reception ==
Cristiano Luchetti, an associate professor at the American University of Ras Al Khaimah, views the Al Seef development as a historically inaccurate extension of the Al Fahidi Historical Neighbourhood. According to Luchetti, Al Seef layout departs from the original narrow alleyways called Sikka traditionally seen in Bur Dubai. Luchetti describes the development as a form of "historical fraud" based on a critical interpretation of the usage of components taken from the features of the local architecture of Dubai without sufficient interpretative key and the use of artificially aged finishes and materials.

Marieh Mustafa Sharaf, an urban planner and researcher at Sorbonne University Abu Dhabi, criticized the project for undermining heritage preservation efforts by presenting an inauthentic version of traditional architecture. She highlighted the use of artificial aging techniques that misrepresent Dubai's historical wind tower houses, while the modern section of the development mimics generic real estate designs, leading to architectural confusion among visitors unfamiliar with authentic Emirati heritage.

== Souk Al Seef ==
Souk Al Seef is the heritage section of the development, designed as a reinterpretation of the traditional souks that operated along Dubai Creek in the 1950s, when the creek served as the city's main centre of trade, fishing and pearl diving.

Its design draws on historic photographs of the creekside settlements and adopts elements of local vernacular architecture, including barjeel wind towers and arish palm-frond structures, arranged along narrow alleyways that connect westward to the Al Fahidi Historical Neighbourhood.

The souk houses shops selling Emirati handicrafts, cafés and restaurants overlooking the creek, and a marina where traditional dhows and abras are moored. It is operated by Dubai Holding Asset Management.

== Gallery ==
Al Seef Khor
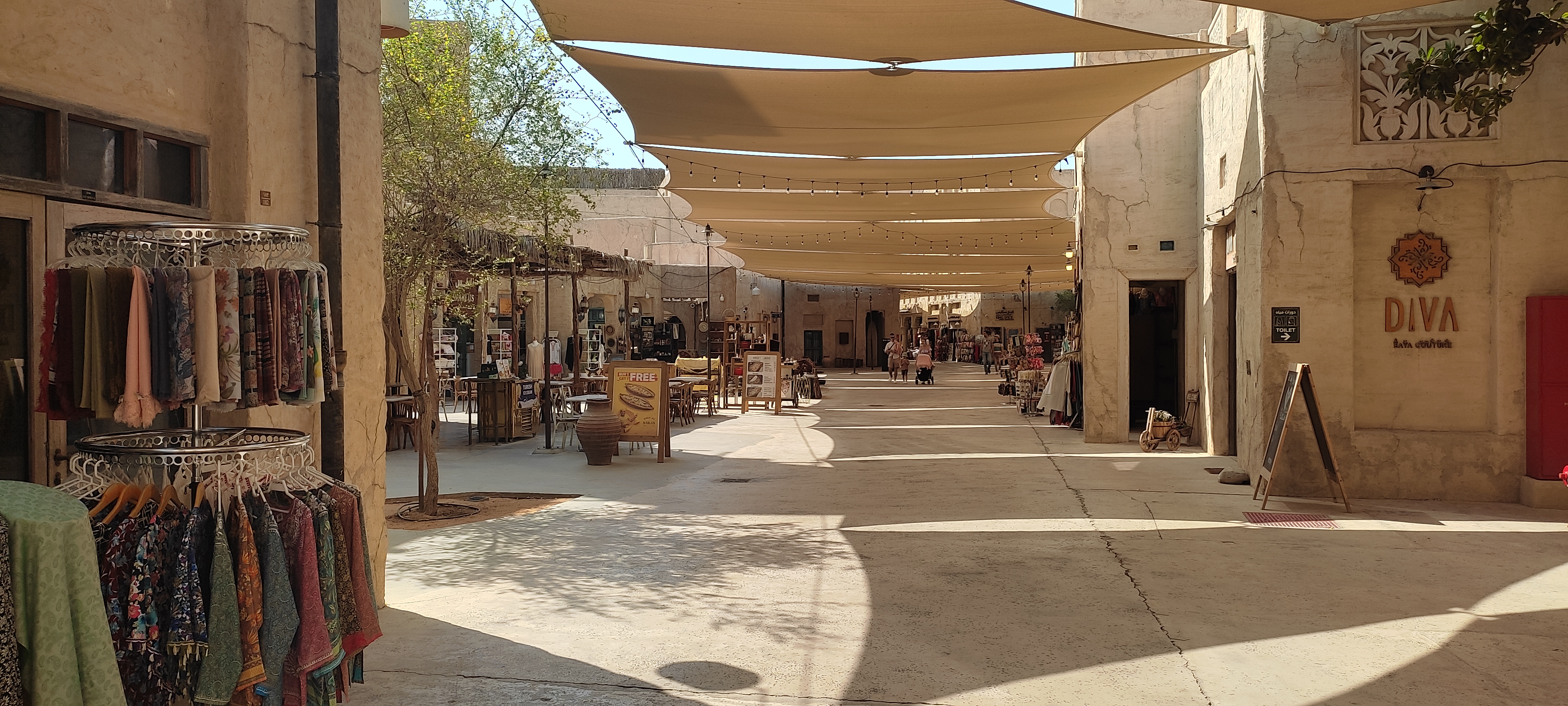
Al Seef Heritage Market

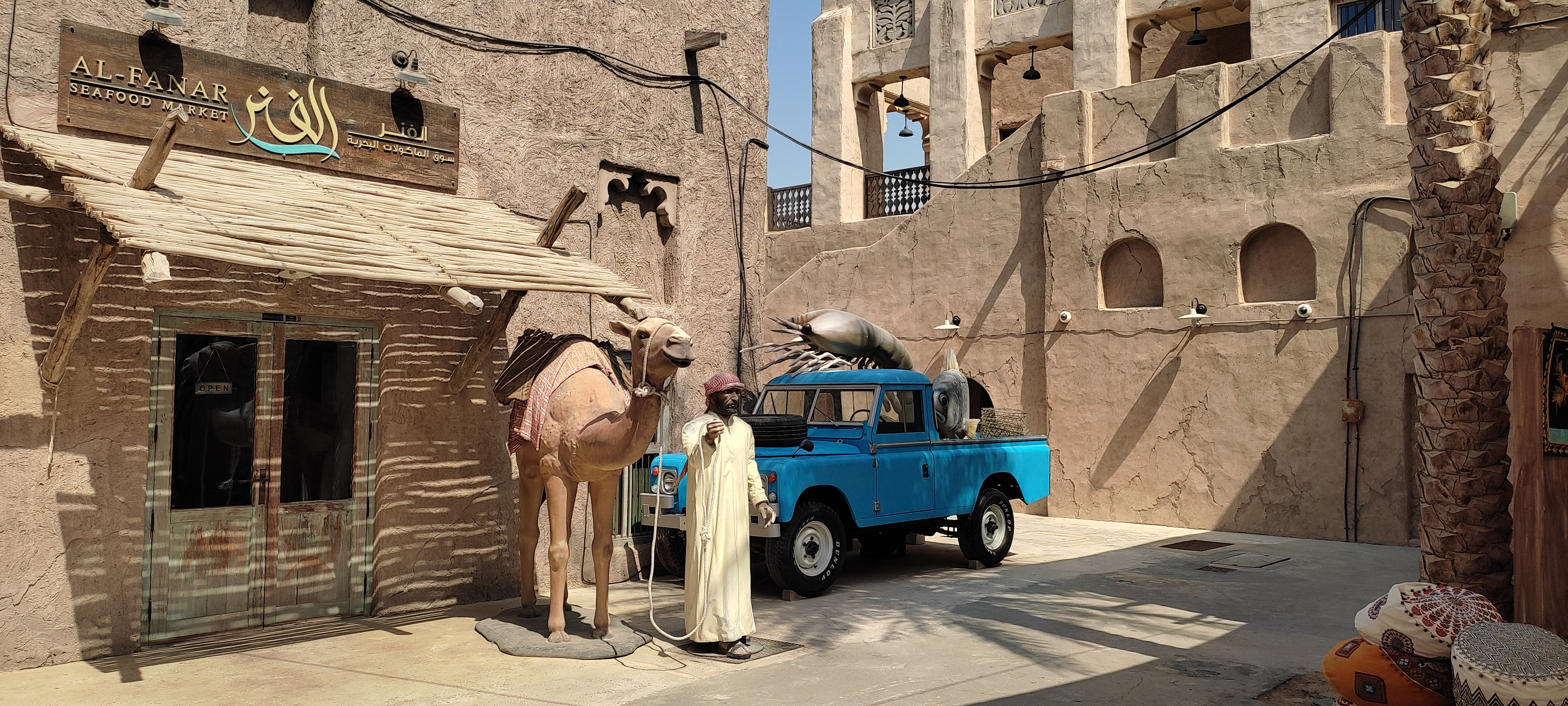
Al Fanar Seafood Restaurant

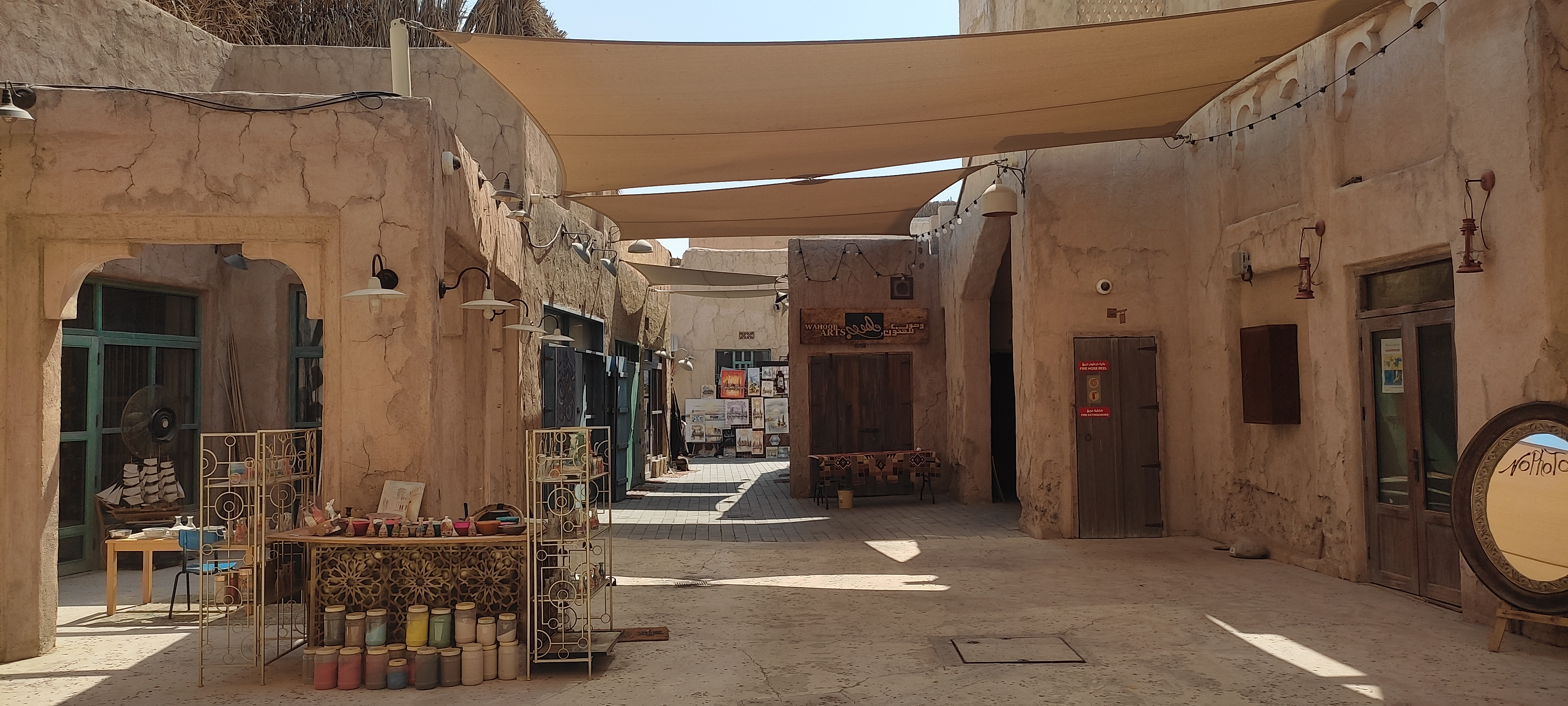
Al Seef Heritage Market

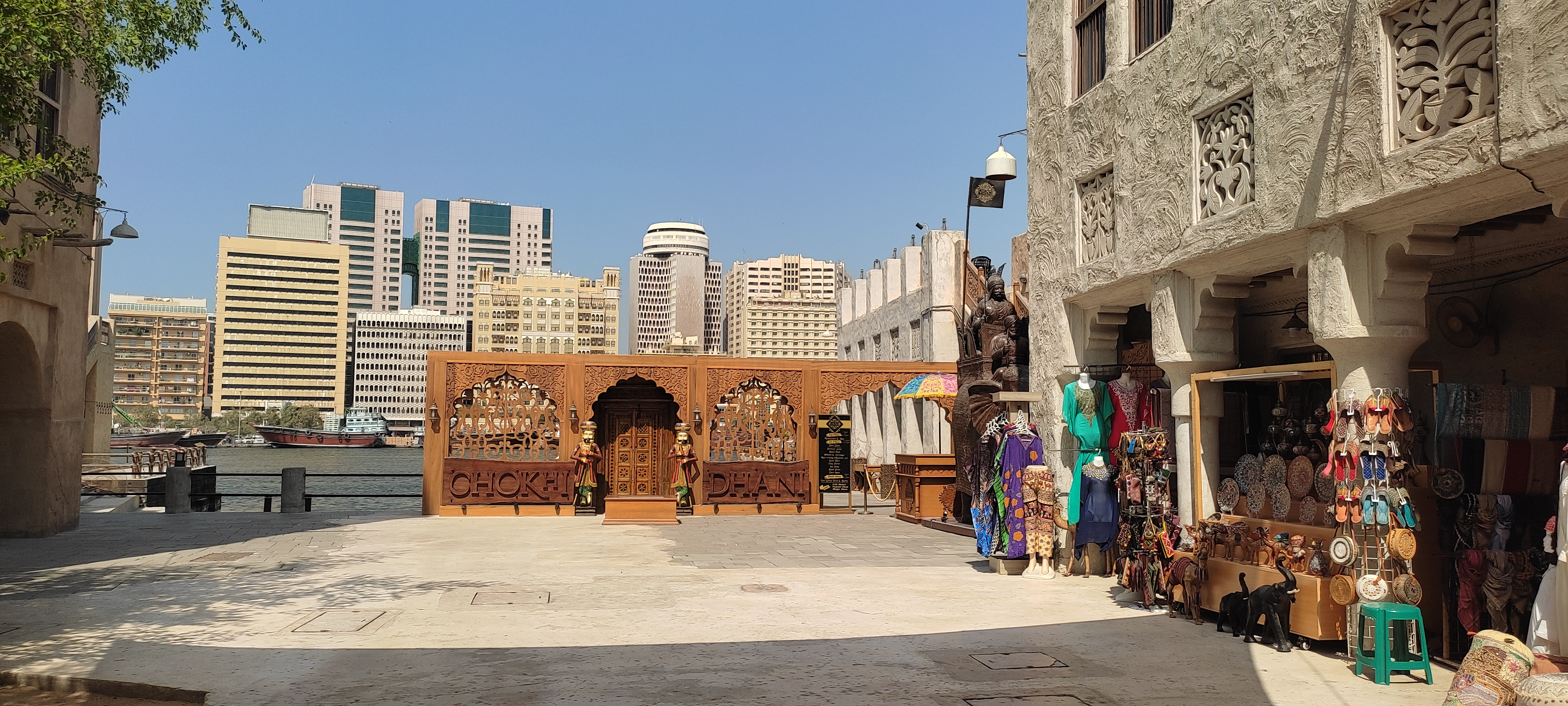
Chokhi Dhani Indian Restaurant

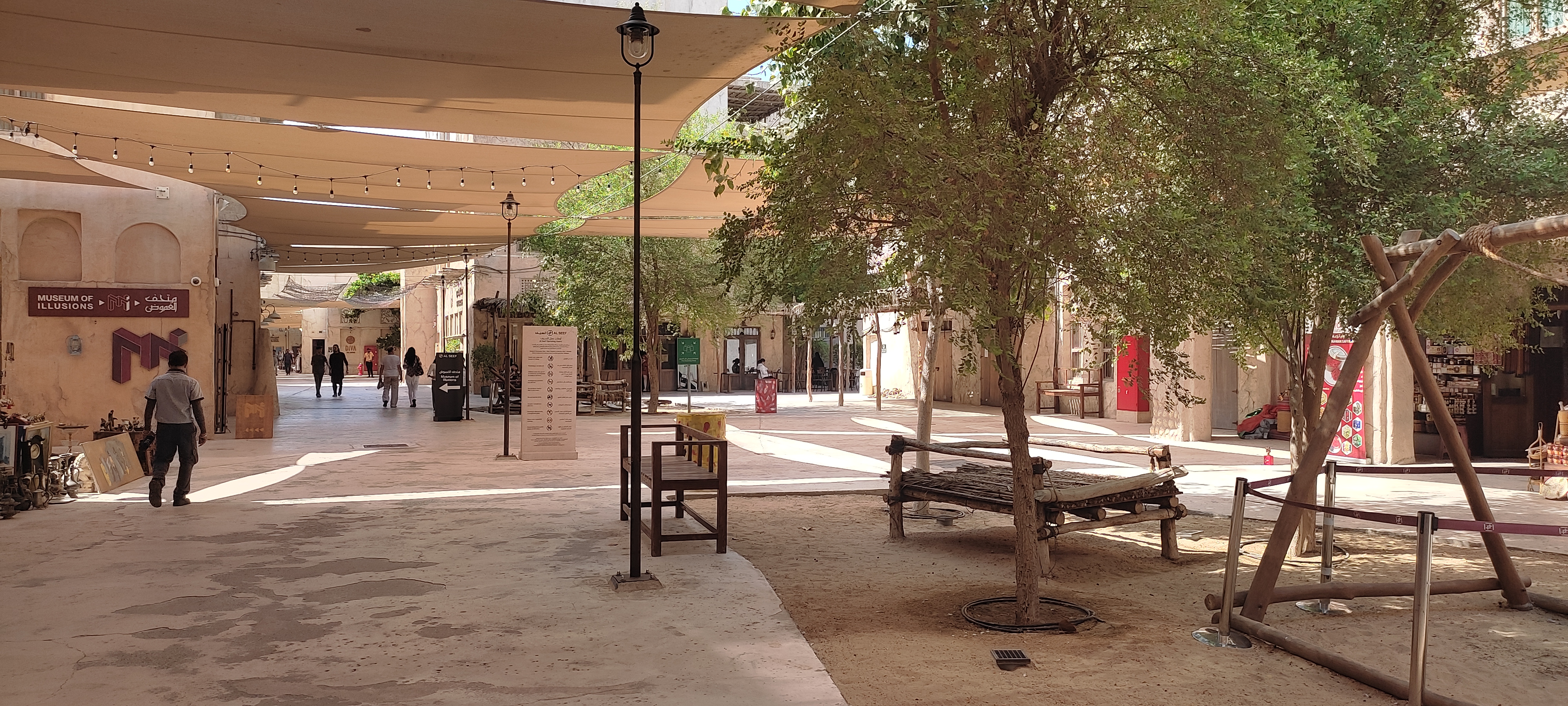
Al Seef Heritage Market

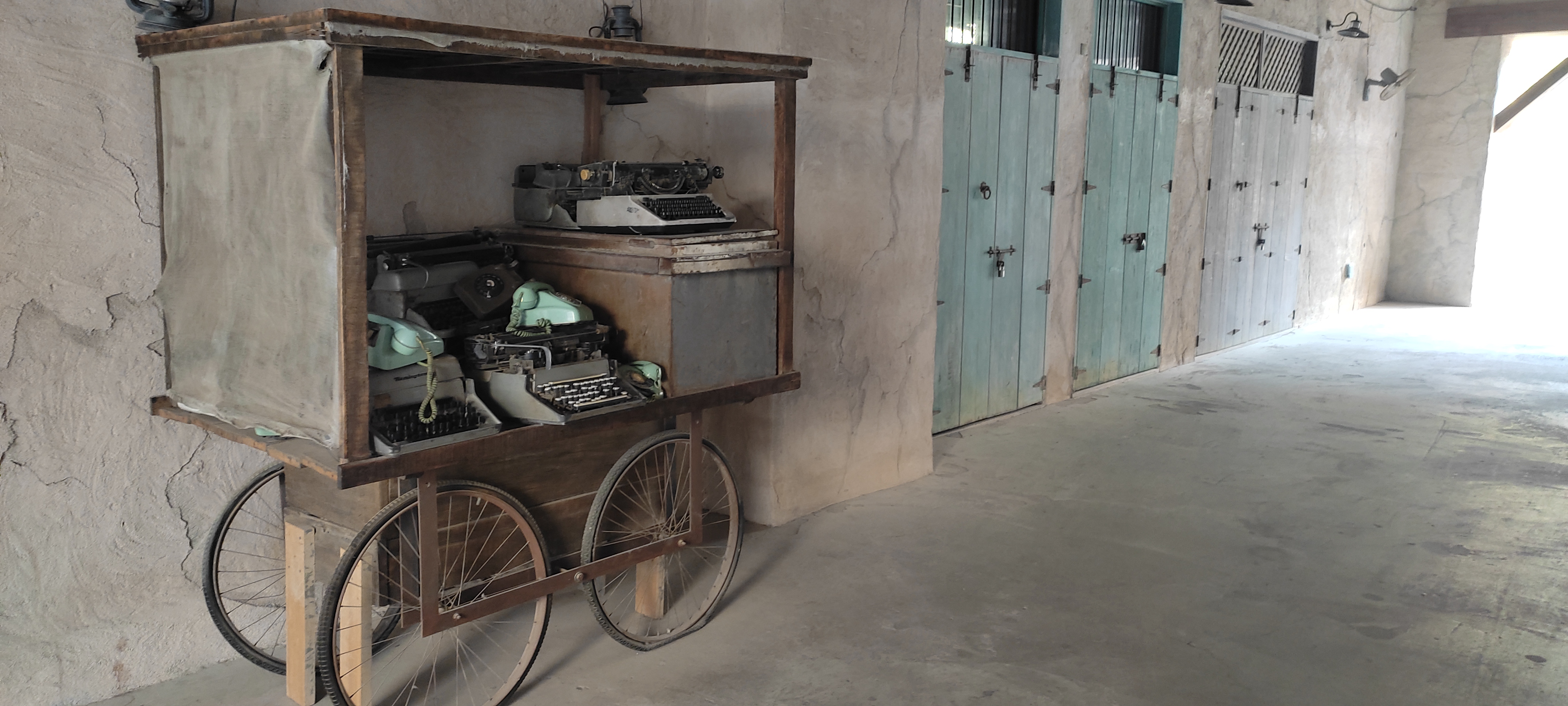
Old Typewriters in Al Seef
