= 2006 in the United Arab Emirates =

- Decades: 1980s; 1990s; 2000s; 2010s; 2020s
- See also: Other events of 2006; Timeline of Emirati history

The following lists events that happened during 2006 in the United Arab Emirates.

== Incumbents ==
- President: Khalifa bin Zayed Al Nahyan
- Prime Minister: Maktoum bin Rashid Al Maktoum (until 4 January), Mohammed bin Rashid Al Maktoum (starting 11 February)

== Events ==
=== February ===
- February 26 - The Dubai Ports World controversy continues with Miami-based Eller & Company trying to obtain an injunction in the UK High Court to prevent the sale of P&O to Dubai Ports World.

=== March ===
- March 1 - The United States urges the United Arab Emirates to end its boycott of Israel: "The Bush administration said yesterday it is pressing the United Arab Emirates to drop its economic boycott of Israel – a major sticking point in the proposed takeover of key U.S. ports by a UAE-owned firm."

=== October ===
- October 26th Dubai built a tower
