= 2005 in the United Arab Emirates =

- Decades: 1980s; 1990s; 2000s; 2010s; 2020s
- See also: Other events of 2005; Timeline of Emirati history

Events from the year 2005 in the United Arab Emirates.

== Incumbents ==
- President: Khalifa bin Zayed Al Nahyan
- Prime Minister: Maktoum bin Rashid Al Maktoum

== Foundations ==
- ALHOSN University.
