= 2009 in the United Arab Emirates =

- Decades: 1980s; 1990s; 2000s; 2010s; 2020s
- See also: Other events of 2009; Timeline of Emirati history

Events from the year 2009 in the United Arab Emirates.

== Incumbents ==
- President: Khalifa bin Zayed Al Nahyan
- Prime Minister: Mohammed bin Rashid Al Maktoum

== Events ==
=== February ===
- February 11 - An oil tanker and a container ship collide off the coast of Dubai.

=== September ===
- September 1 - The UAE government announced plans to establish a nuclear energy program.

=== October ===
- October 25 - The Abu Dhabi Grand Prix took place for the first time at the Yas Marina Circuit.
