= 2010 in the United Arab Emirates =

- Decades: 1990s; 2000s; 2010s; 2020s
- See also: Other events of 2010; Timeline of Emirati history

The following lists events that happened during 2010 in the United Arab Emirates.

== Incumbents ==
- President: Khalifa bin Zayed Al Nahyan
- Prime Minister: Mohammed bin Rashid Al Maktoum

== Events ==
=== January ===
- January 2 - The 2010 Capitala World Tennis Championship ends after starting on December 31, 2009.
- January 4 - Burj Khalifa, the world tallest building, was opened to the public.
- January 10 - Sheikh Issa bin Zayed Al Nahyan is acquitted of beating a former business partner in a videotaped attack.
- January 19 - Assassination of Mahmoud al-Mabhouh in Dubai.

=== February ===
- February 4 - Debt-ridden emirate of Dubai confirms the discovery of a new oilfield.
- February 19 - Dubai's police chief calls for the head of Mossad to be arrested if Israel's spy agency is found to have been behind the killing of a Hamas boss in the emirate.

=== March ===
- March 1 - In response to the assassination of Mahmoud al-Mabhouh, Dubai's police chief states that travelers suspected of being Israeli will not be allowed into the United Arab Emirates even if they arrive with passports issued by other countries.
- March 10–13 - Emirates Airline Festival of Literature occurs in Dubai.
- March 26 - Ahmed bin Zayed Al Nahyan, chief of the Abu Dhabi Investment Authority and one of the most powerful men in the world, goes missing after his glider crashes into a lake in Morocco.
- March 30 - Ahmed bin Zayed Al Nahyan's body is recovered four days after his crash.

=== April ===
- April 27 - Kenya's foreign minister Moses Wetangula arrives in the United Arab Emirates to resolve a diplomatic row after Kenya interrogated and deported members of the UAE's ruling family on terrorism charges.

=== August ===
- August 1 - The United Arab Emirates will suspend some BlackBerry mobile services from October amid concerns that data from some equipment is being exported offshore and managed by foreign organisations.

=== September ===
- September 3 - UPS Airlines Flight 6 crashes in Dubai near the International Airport, killing both crew members.

=== December ===
- December 9–19 - 2010 FIFA Club World Cup is hosted by United Arab Emirates.
- December 15–19 - The 10th World Swimming Championships takes place in Dubai.

== Deaths ==
- 24 February – Mubarak bin Mohammed Al Nahyan, the first interior minister and member of the royal family (born 1935)
