= 2011 in the United Arab Emirates =

- Decades: 1990s; 2000s; 2010s; 2020s
- See also: Other events of 2011; Timeline of Emirati history

Events from the year 2011 in the United Arab Emirates.

== Incumbents ==
- President: Khalifa bin Zayed Al Nahyan
- Prime Minister: Mohammed bin Rashid Al Maktoum

== Events ==
=== January ===
- January 9 - Hillary Clinton of the United States speaks out against Iran in Abu Dhabi during a five-day trip to the United Arab Emirates, Oman and Qatar. She requests that the world increase its pressure on Iran, a country she considers "a serious concern".
- January 31 - Oman says it has uncovered a spy network from the United Arab Emirates operating in the country.

=== March ===
- March 9 - Intellectuals in the United Arab Emirates petition the country's government for free and fair elections.
- March 20 - The United Arab Emirates sends aircraft to Sardinia, Libya to join the anti-Gaddafi effort.

=== April ===
- April 12 – British tourist Lee Bradley Brown dies in police custody of causes that are still not clear.
- April 18 - An anti-piracy conference opens in Dubai.

=== May ===
- May 15 - The New York Times reports that private military company Xe Services LLC (previously Blackwater Worldwide) is putting together an army of mercenaries in the United Arab Emirates.
- May 22 - The embassy of the United Arab Emirates is attacked in Sana'a, Yemen as it holds a meeting of Arab and Western mediators leading to an evacuation by helicopter.

=== July ===
- July 18 - The trial of five bloggers in the United Arab Emirates for advocating democratic reforms resumes.

=== September ===
- September 24 - Voters in the United Arab Emirates go to the polls for parliamentary elections.
- September - Kempinski Residences Palm Jumeirah opens in Dubai.

== Sports ==
- 2011 Dubai Tennis Championships
