= 2008 in the United Arab Emirates =

- Decades: 1980s; 1990s; 2000s; 2010s; 2020s
- See also: Other events of 2008; Timeline of Emirati history

Events from the year 2008 in the United Arab Emirates.

== Incumbents ==
- President: Khalifa bin Zayed Al Nahyan
- Prime Minister: Mohammed bin Rashid Al Maktoum

== Deaths ==
- 2 June – Nasser bin Zayed Al Nahyan, Emirati royal
