= 2022 in the United Arab Emirates =

- Decades: 2000s; 2010s; 2020s
- See also: Other events of 2022; Timeline of Emirati history

Events in the year 2022 in the United Arab Emirates.

== Incumbents ==
Photo	Post	Name
	President of the United Arab Emirates	Khalifa bin Zayed Al Nahyan (until 13 May)
	President of the United Arab Emirates	Mohamed bin Zayed Al Nahyan (starting 13 May)
	Prime Minister of the United Arab Emirates	Mohammed bin Rashid Al Maktoum

== Events ==
Ongoing: COVID-19 pandemic in the United Arab Emirates

=== January ===
- 1 January
  - The UAE moved its Friday-Saturday weekend to Saturday-Sunday in a landmark reform that came into force on January 1, 2022. The new system was rolled out across all government entities and most firms in the private sector followed suit.
  - The United Arab Emirates announces that unvaccinated citizens will be banned from travel and that vaccinated citizens will need to receive a booster dose of the COVID-19 vaccine beginning on January 10.
- 3 January - Houthi forces capture a United Arab Emirates-flagged cargo ship, the Rwabee, off Al Hudaydah, Yemen. The UAE government says that the vessel was carrying equipment from a closed coalition field hospital on Socotra while the Houthis say that the vessel was carrying military equipment.
- 17 January - 2022 Abu Dhabi attack: Three people are killed in a drone attack on petrol tanks at a major oil storage facility near Abu Dhabi International Airport. The Yemen-based Houthis claim responsibility, saying that they launched "five ballistic missiles and a large number of drones".
- 24 January - The United Arab Emirates Armed Forces intercepts two ballistic missiles over the Emirati capital Abu Dhabi. The Yemen-based Houthis claim responsibility for the attack. American troops stationed at Al Dhafra Air Base near the capital take shelter in bunkers during the attack.

=== February ===
- 12 February - 2021 FIFA Club World Cup: In association football, English club Chelsea win their first FIFA Club World Cup title after beating Brazilian club Palmeiras 2–1 after extra time in the final at the Mohammed bin Zayed Stadium in Abu Dhabi. Chelsea defender Thiago Silva wins the tournament's Golden Ball award.
- 18 February - India and the United Arab Emirates sign a free trade agreement over digital goods, raw materials, and apparels. It is the first major trade deal signed by India since Prime Minister Narendra Modi came into power in 2014.
- 22 February - Museum of the Future opened by the Government of the United Arab Emirates. The choice of the date was officially made because 22 February 2022 is a palindrome date. It is a landmark devoted to innovative and futuristic ideologies located in the Financial District of Dubai. It has three main elements: green hill, building, and void.
- 26 February - The United Arab Emirates removes the mandatory face masks mandate in outdoor spaces, making the use of them optional.

=== March ===
- 28 March - The foreign ministers of Israel, Egypt, Morocco, Bahrain and the United Arab Emirates, as well as the United States Secretary of State, meet in Sde Boker, Israel, and agree to hold regular meetings about regional security and commit to further expanding economic and diplomatic cooperation.
- 31 March - The world expo in Dubai, which was delayed to October 1, 2021, closes after six months.

=== May ===
- 13 May - President of the United Arab Emirates and ruler of Abu Dhabi Khalifa bin Zayed Al Nahyan dies at the age of 73.
- 14 May - The Federal Supreme Council of the United Arab Emirates appoints Mohamed bin Zayed Al Nahyan as the country's new president, who also inherits the Emirate of Abu Dhabi after the death of his half-brother Khalifa bin Zayed Al Nahyan.
- 23 May - Two people are killed and 120 others are injured when a gas cylinder catches fire and explodes at a restaurant in Abu Dhabi.
- 24 May - The United Arab Emirates confirms its first case of monkeypox.

=== June ===
- 6 June - The South African Justice Department confirms that Rajesh Gupta and Atul Gupta of the influential Gupta family have been arrested in the United Arab Emirates for engaging in corrupt practices during the Zuma presidency.

=== July ===
- 29 July - The UAE records its heaviest rainfall in 27 years, with seven people killed by flooding in the Emirates of Sharjah and Fujairah.

=== August ===
- 21 August - The United Arab Emirates announces the reinstallation of its ambassador to Iran, more than six years after it downgraded diplomatic relations with the Islamic republic of Iran after the 2016 attack on the Saudi diplomatic missions in Iran.

== Deaths ==
31 March – Easa Saleh Al Gurg, businessman and diplomat.

13 May – Khalifa bin Zayed Al Nahyan, president (born 1948)
