= 2016 in the United Arab Emirates =

- Decades: 1990s; 2000s; 2010s; 2020s
- See also: Other events of 2016; Timeline of Emirati history

This list details events that occurred in the UAE in 2016

== Incumbents ==
- President: Khalifa bin Zayed Al Nahyan
- Prime Minister: Mohammed bin Rashid Al Maktoum

== Events ==
=== January ===
- January 5 - The UAE government blocked access to The New Arab, a Qatari-owned news website.

=== February ===
- February 10 - Ohoud Al Roumi is appointed as the UAE's first minister of happiness.

=== March ===
- March 2 - Hungary signed agreements with the UAE concerning nuclear energy and business.
- March 7-8 - US Vice President Joe Biden started his five-day trip to the Middle East with a visit to the UAE.
- March 9 - A storm hit UAE, cutting power and closing schools in Abu Dhabi and early dismissal in Dubai.
- March 22-24 - Michael X. Garrett, the commanding general of U.S. Army Central, met with key military leaders of the United Arab Emirates to discuss partnerships, military-to-military cooperation and future training opportunities.
- March 29 - A large fire hit at least two residential towers in the city of Ajman.

=== June ===
- June 29 - Emirati authorities block access to The Middle East Eye, which had been reporting on the country’s involvement in the war in Yemen as well as on human rights violations.

=== August ===
- August 3 - Emirates Flight 521 catches fire at Dubai International Airport; all passengers were saved but one firefighter is killed.

=== October ===
- October 2 - A military vessel operated by the UAE military is hit by rockets from Yemeni Houthi fighters.
- October 5 - A civilian ship passing through the Red Sea was attacked by Houthi fighters.

=== November ===
- November 1 - UAE establishes military base in eastern Libya.

=== December ===
- December 3 - King Salman of Saudi Arabia visited the UAE before meeting with the Gulf Cooperation Council (GCC).

== Sports ==
=== August ===
- August 5-21 - 13 athletes from the United Arab Emirates competed at the 2016 Summer Olympics in Rio de Janeiro, Brazil.

=== November ===
- November 25-27 - The 2016 Abu Dhabi Grand Prix is held, which Lewis Hamilton went on to win.
