= 2013 in the United Arab Emirates =

- Decades: 1990s; 2000s; 2010s; 2020s
- See also: Other events of 2013; Timeline of Emirati history

Events from the year 2013 in the United Arab Emirates.

== Incumbents ==
- President: Khalifa bin Zayed Al Nahyan
- Prime Minister: Mohammed bin Rashid Al Maktoum

== Events ==
=== March ===
- March 19-21 – Cyril Karabus is cleared of any wrongdoing and is found not guilty in his manslaughter and forgery convictions he received in absentia almost ten years prior.

=== April ===
- April 18 - Authorities in the United Arab Emirates say they have arrested seven suspected members of an al-Qaeda-linked "terrorist cell" seeking to carry out operations in the country and the region.

=== July ===
- July 2 - 68 Islamists accused of conspiring against the United Arab Emirates federal government, sentenced to 15 years.
- July 17 - In a new law the United Arab Emirates is offering citizens a gram of gold for every kilogram of weight they lose in an attempt to curb the rising obesity rate in the nation.

=== August ===
- August 19 - Attorney general Mohammad Ishaq Aloko is fired by Afghan President Hamid Karzai, over an unsanctioned meeting with Taliban peace negotiators in the United Arab Emirates.

=== Undated ===
- ServiceMarket - an online home services marketplace is founded in the UAE.

== Sports ==
- Dubai World Cup
