= Abdullah Hayayei =

Emirati Paralympic athlete

Personal information
- Born: 4 December 1980
- Died: 11 July 2017 (aged 36)

Sport
- Country: United Arab Emirates
- Sport: Athletics

Abdullah Hayayei (4 December 1980 – 11 July 2017) was an Emirati athlete. He competed at the 2016 Summer Paralympics, finishing sixth in the javelin and seventh in the shot put.

Hayayei died in London at the Newham Leisure Centre, where he was training for the 2017 World Para Athletics Championships, on 11 July 2017 after a throwing cage fell on his head. He was survived by five children. In 2025, UK Athletics and its former head of sport Keith Davies were charged with manslaughter and Health and Safety at Work etc. Act 1974 offence in relation to Hayayei's death. UK Athletics initially denied the manslaughter charges in March 2025 before changing their plea and admitting corporate manslaughter at a February 2026 Old Bailey hearing.
