= Abdullah Al Nauri =

Emirati novelist and police officer (1959–2021)

- Born: 1959; Ras Al Khaimah, UAE
- Died: 18 April 2021 (aged 61–62); Ras Al Khaimah, UAE
- Occupation(s): Novelist, police officer

Abdullah Muhammad Issa Al Nauri Al Ali (Arabic: عبد الله محمد عيسى الناوري العلي) was an Emirati novelist and police officer. He is credited as the first crime fiction author in the United Arab Emirates, with his novel, the Arabic language A Neck in Search of a Necklace, written and published in 1978 when he was 19 years of age.

== Novelist ==
Abdullah Al Nauri was born and raised in the Emirate of Ras Al Khaimah. He joined the police force in 1975, and his experience in the police added to a childhood interest in crime literature. Although the author of only one full-length novel, he was a widely published writer of short stories and poetry.

A Neck in Search of a Necklace was originally privately published by Al Nauri, but a second edition was subsequently published in 2013 by the UAE's Ministry of Culture, Youth and Community Development in cooperation with the Emirates Writers and Writers Union. The book has been the subject of critical acclaim and academic evaluation since its original publication, both as a pioneering effort but also for its use of language and its narrative form. It has been credited with inspiring the emergence of over 20 Emirati crime novelists. As well as the first Emirati crime novel, the book also stands as the first full-length work of fiction published in the emirate of Ras Al Khaimah.

Al Nauri died on April 18, 2021, at the age of 62 due to a chronic heart condition.

== Works ==
- "A Neck in Search of a Necklace", 1978 and reprinted in 2013 (ISBN 9789948040439)
