= 100 Miles =

2007 Emirati short film

- film poster
- Directed by: Mustafa Abbas
- Written by: Mustafa Abbas
- Produced by: Mustafa Abbas
- Starring: Mustafa Abbas; Mahmood Arjumand; Kurt Neyberg; Salma Othman
- Edited by: Mustafa Abbas
- Music by: Khaldoun Haddad
- Production companies: Night & Day Pictures
- Release date: March 8, 2007
- Running time: 26 minutes
- Country: United Arab Emirates
- Language: English

100 Miles is a 2007 Emirati short comedy thriller crime film written and directed by Mustafa Abbas and starring Abbas, Mahmood Arjumand, Kurt Neyberg, and Salma Othman. The film won Best Non-Documentary at the 2007 Emirates Film Competition and was screened at the Dubai International Film Festival in 2008 as part of the Emirati Voices category.

== Plot ==
100 Miles is a suspenseful thriller about schizophrenic Miles McManus. One day, Miles' rival, Ted Garcia, wakes up to find Miles tying him up in a bathtub, accusing him of raping his girlfriend Annabelle James. Ted tries to convince Miles of his innocence. Miles then discovers Annabelle has been murdered and finds that she was killed by her stepfather, Jonathan Rivers, who sought to seize the fortune that Annabelle's mother had left her.

== Cast ==
- Mustafa Abbas as Shane
- Mahmood Arjumand as Miles McManus Jr.
- Kurt Neyberg as Mr. Clemens
- Salma Othman as Annabelle James
- Mohammed Rabi as Ted Garcia
- Qais Rabi as Jonathan Rivers
