= American University of Ras Al Khaimah =

Public university if Ras Al Khaimah, UAE

- الجامعة الأمريكية في رأس الخيمة
- Former name: George Mason University Ras Al Khaimah campus
- Type: Public university
- Established: 2009
- Location: Ras Al Khaimah, United Arab Emirates
- Website: aurak.ac.ae

The American University of Ras Al Khaimah (AURAK; Arabic: الجامعة الأمريكية في رأس الخيمة) is a public university in Ras Al Khaimah, United Arab Emirates. It began in 2005 as a branch campus of George Mason University and became AURAK in 2009. Its students represent 46 nationalities.

AURAK offers undergraduate and postgraduate programmes in fields including biotechnology, mass communication, architecture, artificial intelligence, computer science, business and engineering. The university is licensed by the UAE Ministry of Education and is accredited by the Southern Association of Colleges and Schools Commission on Colleges (SACSCOC) in the United States. It has also received institutional accreditation from the UK's Quality Assurance Agency for Higher Education (QAA).

== History ==
George Mason University established its campus in Ras Al Khaimah in 2005. The university closed its campus operations there effective summer 2009, and AURAK took over the premises on 1 June that year. Sharon Siverts, a former vice president of the George Mason campus, became AURAK's first president.

The UAE Ministry of Higher Education and Scientific Research licensed AURAK in July 2009, and the university planned to begin classes in September of that year.

== Academics ==
AURAK offers undergraduate and postgraduate programmes across several academic disciplines. Its graduate programmes include a Master of Business Administration (MBA) and a master's degree in engineering project management.

In January 2026, the university introduced a Bachelor of Science in chemical engineering with a concentration in Petroleum Engineering.

== Research ==
In February 2026, AURAK inaugurated its Advanced Technology and Artificial Intelligence Center within the School of Engineering and Computing. The center was established with support from the Telecommunications and Digital Government Regulatory Authority through its ICT Fund.

In September 2026, a study by AURAK researchers identified 17 barriers to air taxi adoption in emerging economies. The study grouped the barriers into technological, organisational, environmental and human factors.

== Partnerships ==
In 2018, AURAK signed a memorandum of understanding with Al Nuaimi Group, a construction and infrastructure company based in Ras Al Khaimah. The agreement covered collaborative research, workshops, conferences and student internship opportunities.

In 2022, AURAK partnered with Siemens on an energy-efficiency project involving the retrofit of systems across 19 campus buildings.

In May 2025, AURAK signed a memorandum of understanding with Rowan University in New Jersey, United States, to strengthen academic collaboration through student and faculty exchanges and joint educational programmes.

In December 2025, AURAK selected Ellucian Student as its student information system to modernize academic and administrative processes.
