= UAE International Award for Poets of Peace =

Emirati literary awards

- Awarded for: Poetry promoting peace and humanitarian work
- Date: May 1
- Location: Dubai, International Humanitarian City (IHC)
- Country: United Arab Emirates
- First award: 2014

The UAE International Award for Poets of Peace was launched on 1 May 2014 for poets at the International Humanitarian City (IHC) in Dubai, United Arab Emirates. It is claimed to be the first award of its kind, bridging a multitude of nationalities and languages in which poets will present their sonnets, spreading a message of peace around the world.

The global award plan at using poetry to disseminate consciousness amongst people about the importance of peace and raises further awareness for humanitarian work around the world.

The award is launched in collaboration with the United Nations World Food Programme.

== Objectives ==
The Award has the following objectives:

1. Promote the peace message to the world
2. Spread the culture of peace across the world
3. Raise awareness for humanitarian work around the world
4. Support world relief programs.

== Vision ==
The Award has the following vision:

1. Sending a message to the world about the need to stop war and combat hunger
2. Unifying world peace in one entity bound by peace, without discrimination on race or religion, & spreading the message of love, unity and peace.
