= 2023 in the United Arab Emirates =

- Decades: 2000s; 2010s; 2020s
- See also: Other events of 2023; Timeline of Emirati history

Events in the year 2023 in the United Arab Emirates.

== Incumbents ==
Photo	Post	Name
	President of the United Arab Emirates	Mohamed bin Zayed Al Nahyan
	Prime Minister of the United Arab Emirates	Mohammed bin Rashid Al Maktoum

== Events ==
Ongoing: COVID-19 pandemic in the United Arab Emirates

=== April ===
- 25 April – Mohammed bin Rashid Space Centre (MBRSC) lunar rover Rashid attempted to land on the Moon's Atlas crater aboard ispace's Hakuto-R Mission 1 lander however the lander crashed into the Moon and the rover was destroyed.

=== March ===
- 19 March – Scientists discover ruins of a pearling town near Umm Al Quwain. The town is considered to be the oldest ever found in the country, dating back to the 6th century.
- 29 March – UAE President Mohamed bin Zayed Al Nahyan announces that he has named his son Khaled bin Mohamed Al Nahyan as the Abu Dhabi Crown Prince. City Football Group owner Mansour bin Zayed Al Nahyan is also appointed as Vice President.

=== May ===
- 22 May – SeaWorld Abu Dhabi opens its door to the public.

=== June ===
- 8 June – UAE and Cambodia sign a Comprehensive Economic Partnership Agreement (CEPA).

=== November ===
- 4–6 November – 2023 United Nations Climate Change conference is held in Dubai.
- 17 November – The Al Dhafra solar farm, the largest solar farm in the world, comes online in the United Arab Emirates. The solar farm is expected to power around 200,000 homes.

=== Sports ===
- June – 2023 World Para Powerlifting Championships
- 2022–23 UAE Pro League

== Deaths ==
- 2 February – Mohammed Saeed Al Mulla, 97, banker and politician.
