= Bab al-Qasr =

Coordinates: 24.4583°N 54.3205°E

BAB AL QASR
- باب القصر
- Interactive map of the BAB AL QASR area

General information
- Status: Completed
- Location: Abu Dhabi, United Arab Emirates
- Construction started: 2009
- Completed: 2012
- Cost: 375 million USD

Technical details
- Floor count: 37
- Floor area: 180,000

Design and construction
- Developer: (Emroc) Emirates-Moroccan General Trading & Investment Company

Other information
- Number of rooms: 677

BAB AL QASR (Arabic: باب القصر) which literally means “door of the palace”, is a five star hotel located on the west end of Abu Dhabi, the capital of United Arab Emirates. The hotel opened at the end of 2016.
