= Mohamed Al Khaja =

UAE ambassador to Israel (born 1980)

- محمد الخاجة
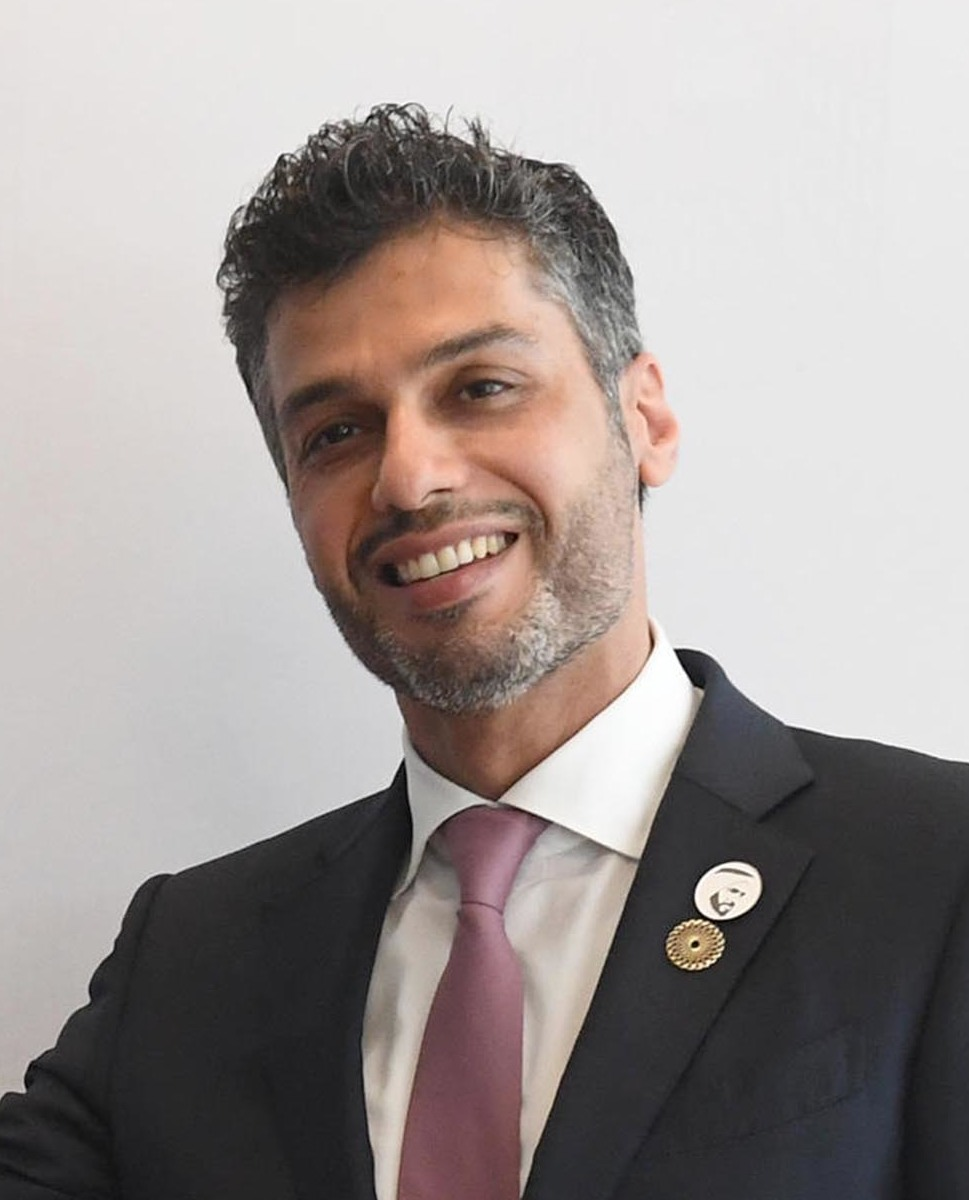

1st Ambassador of the United Arab Emirates to Israel
- Incumbent
- Assumed office February 14, 2021
- President: Khalifa bin Zayed Al Nahyan; Mohamed bin Zayed Al Nahyan
- Prime Minister: Mohammed bin Rashid
- Preceded by: Position established

Personal details
- Born: 1980 (age 45–46) Abu Dhabi, United Arab Emirates
- Education: Northeastern University; Vienna University of Economics and Business

Mohamed Al Khaja (Arabic: محمد الخاجة; born 1980) is the first and current United Arab Emirates ambassador to Israel. He took office on 14 February 2021, being the first ambassador to Israel in the country's history. Previously, he was the chief of staff to the Ministry of Foreign Affairs and International Cooperation, where he was appointed in 2010.

== Early life and education ==
Mohamed Al Khaja was born in Abu Dhabi, United Arab Emirates.

He holds a degree in Political Science from Northeastern University in Boston, Massachusetts, and a Master of Business Administration from the Vienna University of Economics and Business.

== Career and personal life ==
Mohamed has taken roles in energy management, disarmament, business development for Mubadala Investment Company, Borouge, and The Emirates Center for Strategic Studies and Research. He has also been appointed as a member of the Board of Trustees of the Sorbonne University in Abu Dhabi, since 2018. Mohamed is married and is a father to four children.
