= Israel–United Arab Emirates relations =

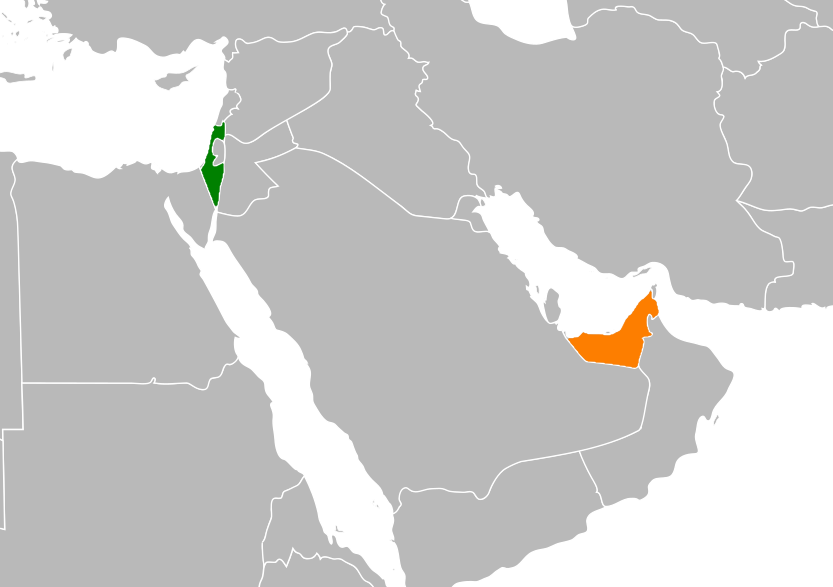

- Israel: United Arab Emirates

Diplomatic mission
- Embassy of Israel, Abu Dhabi: Embassy of United Arab Emirates, Tel Aviv

Envoy
- Israeli Ambassador to United Arab Emirates Amir Hayek: Emirati Ambassador to Israel; Mohamed Al Khaja

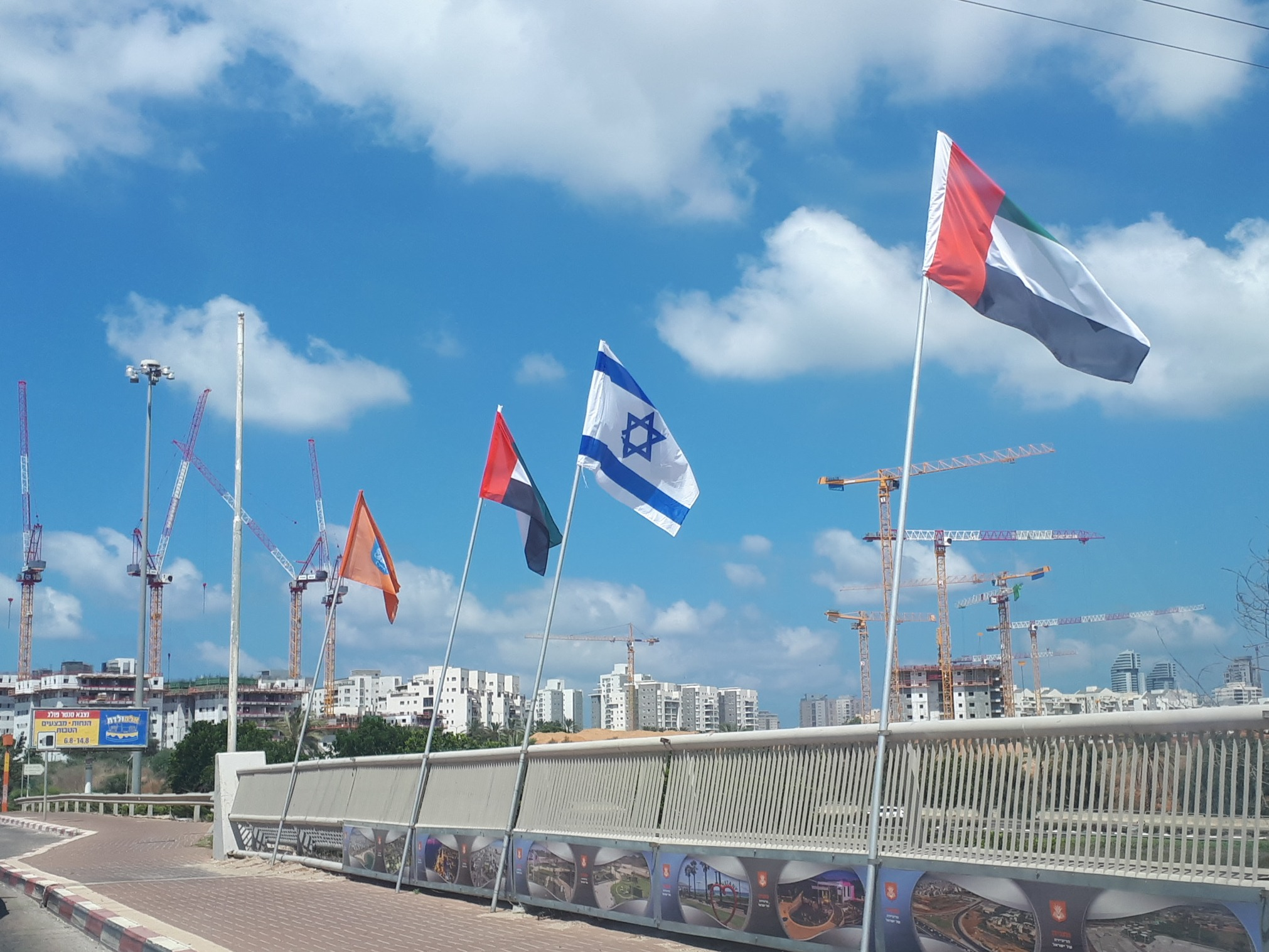
Flags of Israel and the UAE, together with the flag of Netanya, flown on Netanya's "Shalom Bridge" over Highway 2 in August 2020.

Diplomatic relations between Israel and the United Arab Emirates trace their origins to the early days of the Oslo Accords, where Israeli and Emirati diplomats had contact with each other in the 1990s in Washington, D.C. The first diplomatic facility between the two countries opened in 2015, when Israel opened an official diplomatic mission in Abu Dhabi to the International Renewable Energy Agency.

Israel and the United Arab Emirates formally agreed in August 2020 to establish diplomatic relationship in a United States-brokered deal that also requires Israel to halt its plan to annex parts of the West Bank, including the Jordan Valley. The Israeli embassy in Abu Dhabi was opened on 24 January 2021 with Eitan Na'eh serving as Chargé d'affaires. The embassy of the United Arab Emirates opened on 30 May 2021 in Tel Aviv, with Mohamed Al Khaja serving as the first ambassador of the UAE to Israel.

Since establishing official relationship in 2020, the relationship between Israel and UAE was strongly reinforced with public diplomacy, numerous signed agreements including reciprocal visa free travel in 2020 and free trade agreement in 2022, as well as expanded tourism and trade relationship until the diplomatic impact following the Gaza war.

== History ==
=== 1973 Yom Kippur War ===
The UAE became an independent country in 1971. The UAE's first president, Sheikh Zayed bin Sultan Al Nahyan, referred to Israel as "the enemy" of the Arab countries during the timeline surrounding the events of Yom Kippur War.

=== Origins: Oslo Accords ===
The relationship between Israel and UAE started in the 1990s in Washington, D.C., where Israeli and Emirati diplomats had contact with each other during the timeline surrounding the Oslo Accords. The UAE wanted to buy advanced F-16 Fighting Falcon from the US, but American and Emirati officials were concerned that Israel would prevent the sale. Jeremy Issacharoff, an Israeli diplomat in Washington, D.C., and Jamal Al Suwaidi, an Emirati academic, met in Washington, D.C. Israeli and Emirati officials didn't agree on the Palestinian issue, but they shared a similar perspective on Iranian policy in the region. Israeli Prime Minister Yitzhak Rabin would later inform the Clinton Administration that he would not object to the sale of F-16 to the UAE.

=== 2010 assassination of Mahmoud Al-Mabhouh ===
The assassination of Mahmoud al-Mabhouh occurred in Dubai on 19 January 2010. Israel denied involvement. However, a Dubai Police investigation linked 27 suspects using camera footage, transactions on prepaid debit cards using the same type of card, phone call records who called the same number in Austria, and camera surveillance which showed two operatives using the bathroom facility at the same hotel to wear disguises. Dubai Police released a 27-minute footage showing operatives trailing Mabhouh. A total of 27 suspects who carried forged passports from Australia, France, Germany, Ireland, and United Kingdom were implicated, with many of the passport names using the names of Israeli dual citizens. This led governments to call Israeli ambassadors for diplomatic repercussion for the forgery of passports. Governments of Australia, Ireland, and United Kingdom also expelled Israeli diplomats. The UAE released images of the suspects and called, via Interpol, for the arrest of Meir Dagan, director of Israel's Mossad. The incident caused the unofficial Israel and UAE's diplomatic relationship to detoriate.

=== Iran nuclear program ===
After the inauguration of US President Barack Obama in 2009, the Israeli and UAE ambassadors to the United States jointly urged the incoming administration's Middle East adviser to adopt a tougher line on Iran. Obama lifted sanctions on Iran after signing the JCPOA.

In September 2012, Israeli Prime Minister Benjamin Netanyahu met with UAE Foreign Minister Abdullah bin Zayed Al Nahyan in New York City. Although they agreed on the threat of Iran, the UAE refused to publicly improve relations without progress in the Israel-Palestine peace process. In 2015, the Israeli Ambassador to the United States, Ron Dermer, briefed his UAE counterpart Yousef Al Otaiba on Israel's opposition to the Joint Comprehensive Plan of Action and urged the UAE to take a more active role in opposing the deal.

Close to the end of Obama's presidency, U.S. intelligence agencies became aware of a phone communication between the two countries' officials, including between Netanyahu and a senior UAE leader, and a meeting between Netanyahu and UAE leadership in Cyprus, which was focused on cooperation against Iran. After the election of Donald Trump as U.S. president, both Israel and the UAE lobbied for a rapprochement between the United States and Russia to contain Iranian influence in Syria. In March 2018, Netanyahu met with Otaiba and the Bahraini ambassador to the United States at a restaurant in Washington, D.C., where the issue of Iran was discussed. On 10 October 2018, Dermer and Otaiba shared a table at the annual dinner of the Jewish Institute for National Security of America, where they were seen talking to one another.

=== Expo 2020 ===
In April 2019, Israel announced that it has been invited to take part at Dubai's Expo 2020 innovation fair.

=== 2020 Abraham Accord ===
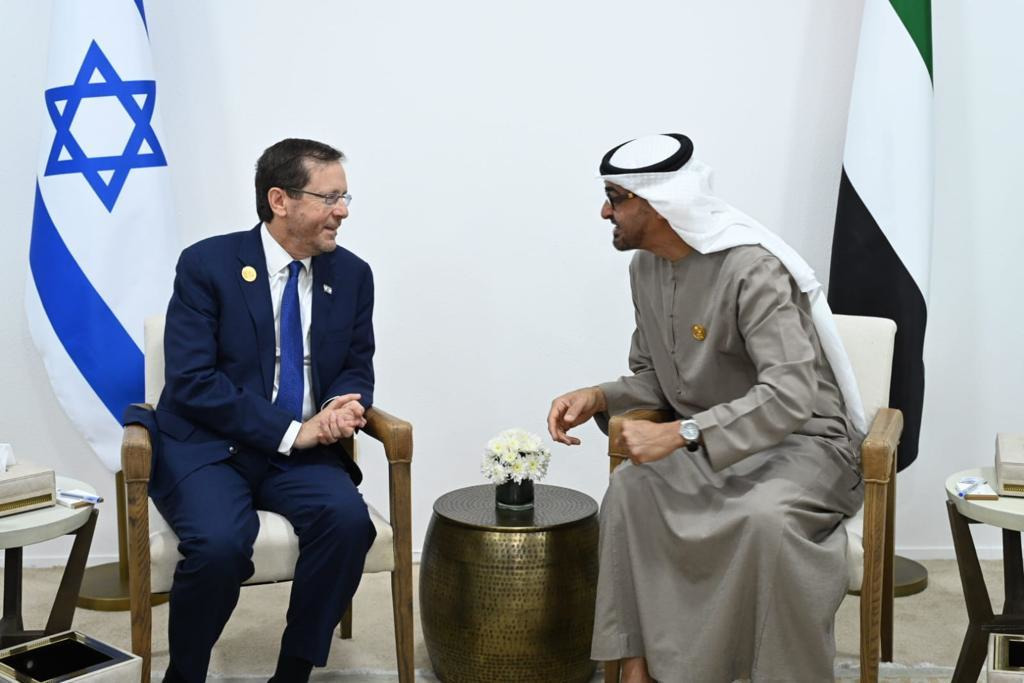
Israeli President Isaac Herzog with UAE's President Mohamed bin Zayed Al Nahyan, 7 November 2022

On 13 August 2020, Israel and the UAE signed an agreement mediated by U.S. President Donald Trump. Under the deal, Israel and the UAE will establish full diplomatic relations, with the UAE becoming the third Arab state, besides Egypt and Jordan, to fully recognize Israel. As part of the deal, Israel agreed to suspend plans for the annexation of the Jordan Valley. Director of the Mossad, Yossi Cohen, secretly visited UAE several times for over a year to broker the Abraham Accord.

The agreement was made official with a signing ceremony on 15 September 2020 at the White House in Washington, D.C. The UAE's ambassador to the US and close adviser to Mohammed bin Zayed, Yousef Al Otaiba, was one of the main negotiators of the peace deal. Al Otaiba was one of the well-connected and powerful advocates in the US who was in contact with Jared Kushner, who was leading the peace deal negotiations. In August 2020, Al Otaiba released a statement praising the Abraham Accord as "a win for diplomacy and for the region" and stated that it "lowers tensions and creates new energy for positive change."

The Abraham Accords revealed the rifts in the relationship between Palestine and the United Arab Emirates and Bahrain. Under a 2002 Arab Peace Initiative, Arab nations declared that Israel would only receive "normal" ties in return for a statehood deal with the Palestinians and an end to the occupation. However, the Palestinian ambassador to the UK, Husam Zomlot warned that the longstanding policy had been undermined. A senior Palestinian politician, Saeb Erekat condemned the deals as a "tremendous encouragement for the Israeli government to continue their occupation". However, under the deal, Israel agreed to "suspend" annexation, but critics stated that the clause was only added as lip service to the Palestinian issue, while Israeli politicians argued that the annexation plan is still a priority.

=== Gaza War ===
Following the 2023 Hamas-led attack on Israel, UAE foreign ministry on October 8 stated in a statement that it was "appalled" by reports Israeli civilians were taken as hostages from their homes and called the Hamas attacks on Israel a "serious and grave escalation". Israeli Prime Minister Benjamin Netanyahu spoke with UAE president Mohamed bin Zayed on 16 October 2023.

Despite the diplomatic impact of the Gaza war, the UAE maintained ties with Israel which allowed the UAE to establish a maternity field hospital, called Al Helal Al Emirati Maternity Hospital, in Gaza. Throughout the war, the UAE condemned the "Israeli continuous violations" and the deaths and injuries of civilians.

In August 2025, Israeli Finance Minister Bezalel Smotrich announced plans to build a settlement that would divide the West Bank and disconnect it from East Jerusalem, undermining efforts for the establishment of a Palestinian state. Smotrich also declared that maps were also being drawn up to annex the West Bank. On 3 September 2025, the UAE warned Israel that annexation of the West Bank would constitute a "red line" that would severely undermine the normalization agreement between Israel and the UAE.

== Official visits ==
On 16 January 2010, Israel's Minister of National Infrastructure Uzi Landau attended a renewable energy conference in Abu Dhabi. He was the first Israeli minister to visit Abu Dhabi.

In January 2016, Israel's Energy Minister visited the UAE at the site of International Renewable Energy Agency headquarters in Abu Dhabi.

In September 2018, the UAE hosted secret talks in Abu Dhabi between Israeli and Turkish officials to discuss restoring relations between those two countries. In October 2018, Miri Regev, Israel's culture and sports minister, visited Abu Dhabi to watch the Israeli judoka team compete at the Abu Dhabi Grand Slam where she also visited the Sheikh Zayed Grand Mosque.

On 13 December 2021, Israeli Prime Minister Naftali Bennett visited the UAE and met with Mohamed bin Zayed Al Nahyan, the Crown Prince of Abu Dhabi. This marked the first time leaders from both countries met with each other. The meeting, which included a shared lunch, went two hours longer than originally expected. Bennet stated that the meeting was about "the region, our economy and technology."

During the 2026 Israel–Iran war, Netanyahu's office said that Benjamin Netanyahu had secretly visited the UAE and met with President Mohamed bin Zayed Al Nahyan in Al Ain on 26 March; the UAE denied that the visit had taken place. Mossad chief Dedi Barnea also visited the UAE at least twice during the war to coordinate military actions. Israeli media reported that Shin Bet chief David Zini had also visited the UAE for security coordination, although the reported visit was not officially confirmed by either side.

On 27 September 2026, Israeli Prime Minister Benjamin Netanyahu visited Abu Dhabi at the invitation of UAE President Mohamed bin Zayed Al Nahyan and met with him. Netanyahu was accompanied by the heads of the National Security Council and Mossad, his military secretary, and his foreign policy adviser. The UAE confirmed the visit the following day and said that the two leaders discussed bilateral relations and ways to strengthen and develop them. Netanyahu's office said that the visit focused on strengthening relations between the two countries and regional challenges, while three senior Israeli officials told Reuters that the talks focused on Iran.

The Associated Press reported, citing people briefed on the meeting, that Netanyahu had asked Mohamed bin Zayed to deny a report that the Emirati president had warned him before the October 7 attacks. Netanyahu's office rejected the account, saying that the visit focused on bilateral relations and regional challenges. Ynet also reported that Netanyahu had met with representatives of several Middle Eastern countries during the visit. However, a senior Saudi official denied that a Saudi representative had attended, while Jordan also denied participation. Ynet subsequently corrected its report, stating that it could not confirm that such a meeting had taken place.

== Travel ==
There were no direct flights between Israel and the UAE prior to 2019, so all flights had to stopover in a third, neutral country (such as Jordan), and no Israeli aircraft was allowed to enter UAE airspace. Restrictions were tightened against the entry of Israeli citizens following the assassination of Hamas officer Mahmoud al-Mabhouh in Dubai, which was blamed on Mossad. In 2012, Qantas teamed up with Emirates, in a deal that involved Qantas flights stopping over in Dubai on Australia-Europe flights. Concerns were raised as to how the UAE travel restrictions would impact Qantas passengers who are nationals of Israel or travelling on an Israeli passport, for example, if such passengers had to stay overnight in Dubai for a connection. Qantas cancelled the deal in 2018.

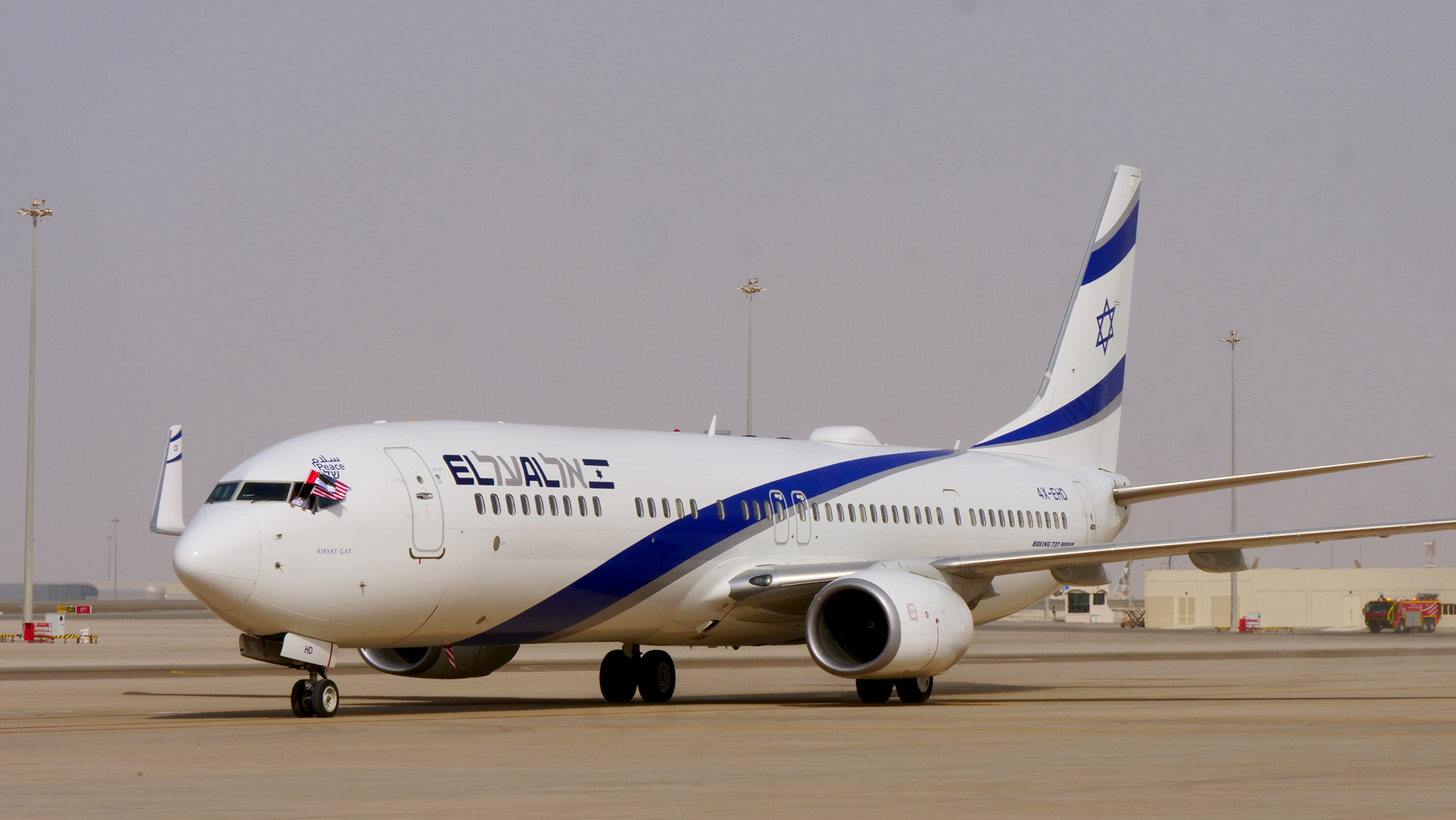
An El Al Boeing 737-900ER landed at Abu Dhabi International Airport for the first time in 2020.

However, there are Jewish expatriates in the UAE, and there are Israelis with dual citizenship who live, visit, and work in the UAE as citizens of other countries.

On 31 August 2020, an El Al Boeing 737-800 (4X-EHD) made a three-hour trip from Tel Aviv to Abu Dhabi over Saudi Arabian airspace to be the first commercial flight between the two countries and the first Israeli flight to be approved to fly over Saudi Arabian airspace. With Saudi Arabia allowing Israeli flights to cross its airspace and significantly reducing operational costs as well as flight times for El Al, the airline will become more competitive on routes to India and other destinations in the Middle East and South Asia.

On 20 October 2020, Israel and the UAE announced a mutual visa exemption agreement, allowing Israeli citizens and Emirati citizens to go to each other's countries visa-free.

On 4 November 2020, Emirati carrier FlyDubai announced that it would start direct flights between Tel Aviv and Dubai from 26 November, with tickets being offered on sale. This would mark the first commercial flight route between Dubai and Tel Aviv.

In January 2021, the visa-exemption agreement between the UAE and Israel was postponed, amidst the COVID-19 restrictions. The decision came after Israel mandated it for the Emirati travelers to quarantine as a precaution. The waiver agreement, which was supposed to be implemented on 13 February 2021, was suspended until 1 July.

On 23 June 2022, Emirates began direct flights between Dubai and Tel Aviv.

== Trade ==
Prior to the normalisation of relations, some Israeli companies conducted business in the UAE indirectly through third parties.

In June 2020, a trading association, known as the UAE-Israel Business Council (UIBC) was created by Dorian Barak, an Israeli-American investor and entrepreneur who had been working in the Persian Gulf region for the past decade, and Fleur Hassan-Nahoum, the Deputy Mayor of Jerusalem. The association consists of over 3000 businesses, business leaders, professionals and public sector leaders from the United Arab Emirates and Israel with the express purpose to foster trade, innovation and cooperation between the two countries.

The UAE-Israel Business Council mission is to build mutually beneficial relationships between Emiratis and Israelis, that advance business ties, investment, and cultural understanding. Key areas of cooperation include technology, finance, logistics and transportation, medical and biotech, agriculture, energy and water, professional services. To date there are over 250 UAE companies trading with the Israel, which is expected to rise to over 500 companies by 2021.

=== Policy forum ===
The Gulf-Israel Policy Forum was established in cooperation with the Moshe Dayan Center for Middle Eastern and African Studies at Tel Aviv University and is headed by founding member, Dan Feferman, a member of the Israeli policy research community, and Nir Boms of the Dayan Center. It includes prominent policy professionals, academics and government advisors from Israel, the UAE, Bahrain and Saudi Arabia. The policy forum acts as a hub for collaboration between policy makers and researchers in Israel and Arab states of the Persian Gulf.

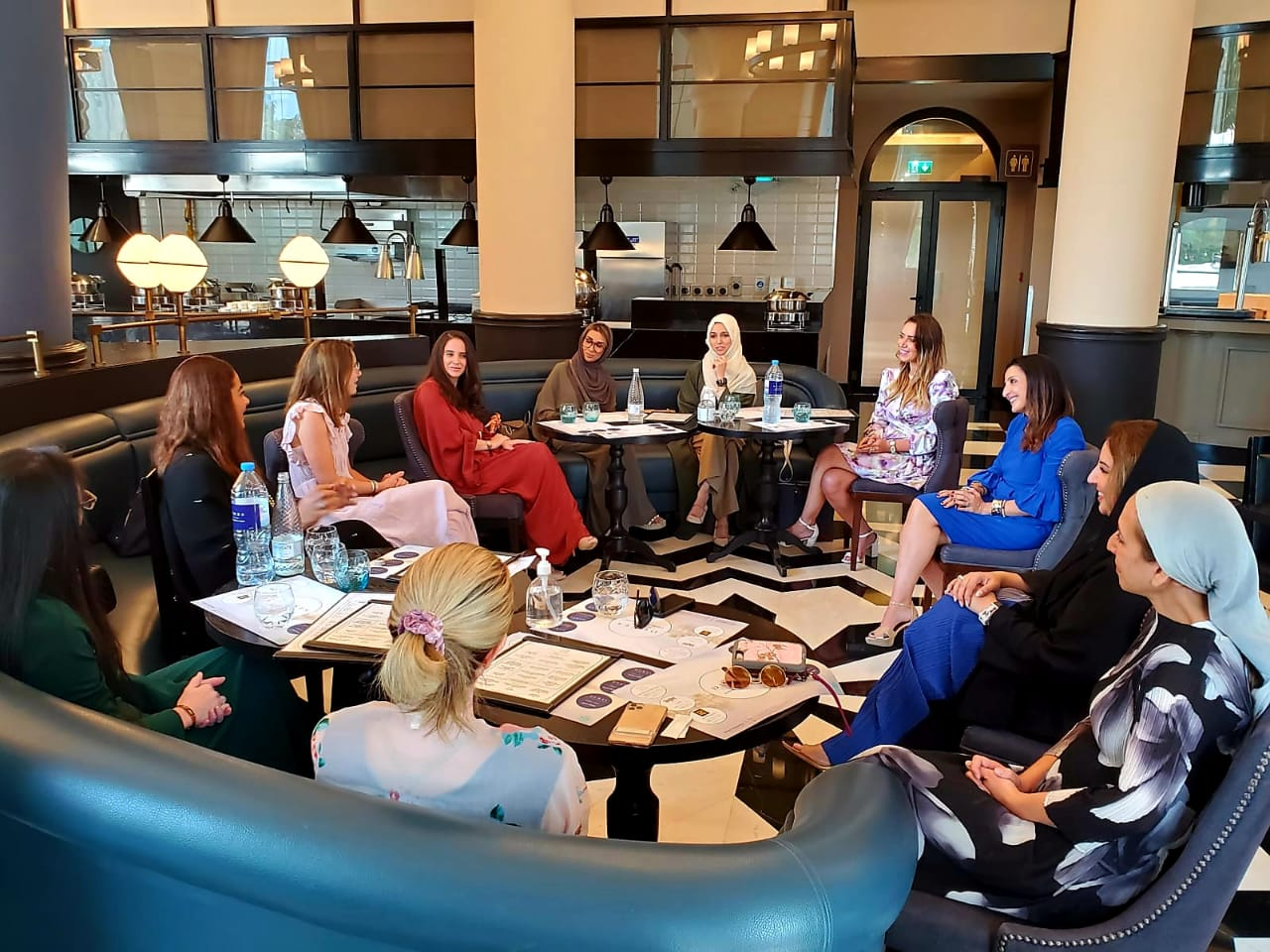
UIBC founding member Fleur Hassan-Nahoum at first Gulf-Israel Women's Forum in Dubai, 9 October 2020

The Gulf-Israel Women's Forum was established as a division of the UIBC by Fleur Hassan-Nahoum and Justine Zwerling, with the goal to unite women from the Middle East in sisterhood, culture, friendship and business. On 9 October 2020, founding members Hassan-Nahoum, Daphne Richemond-Barak and Michal Divon met in Dubai with a prominent set of Emirati women for the first of several Women's Forum events. Such events focus on involving women from Israel and the Arab world in technology, finance, healthcare, media, culture and other sectors.

=== Free trade agreement ===
On 1 April 2022, the two countries concluded negotiations for a bilateral free trade agreement, which will make 95 percent of traded products between them customs-free and will include food, agricultural and cosmetic products, and medicines and medical equipment.

== Military cooperation ==
In August 2016, pilots from both the Israel Air Force and the UAE Air Force participated in a joint Red Flag training exercise with pilots from Pakistan and Spain, in Nevada in the United States.

In 2017, the Israel Air Force and the UAE Air Force held a joint exercise with the air forces of the U.S., Italy and Greece, in Greece, called Iniohos 2017. Another joint aerial training occurred at Iniohos 2019.

After 2011, the UAE and Israel actively participated together on the Egyptian government's side against the Sinai insurgency.

In late August 2020, reports claimed that Israel and UAE plan to establish spy bases on the Yemeni island of Socotra.

In August 2020, the UAE and Israel reached a historic Israel–United Arab Emirates peace agreement to lead towards full normalization of relations between the two countries. The agreement formally became part of the Abraham Accords involving the UAE and Israel and was signed on 15 September 2020. Security experts in Israel raised concern that the agreement was paving way for the Trump administration's proposed sale of F-35 stealth fighter jets and other sophisticated weaponry to the UAE. Israeli Prime Minister Benjamin Netanyahu opposed the sale of the fighter jets, stating that Israel's position on Middle Eastern states, acquiring such high-end weapons, did not change. The UAE Foreign Ministry spokesperson Hend al-Otaiba commented on the link between the Abraham Accord and the proposed sale of US-made F-35 fighter jets to the Emirates, by saying: "In terms of the F35s specifically, this request is not something that emerged from the current accord. Our request for the F-35 has been in process for six years now. Given that the UAE intends to be a partner to Israel, and already has a deep strategic partnership with the US, we are hopeful the request will be granted." Later in October 2020, Israel, in an apparent reference to the F-35, said that it will not oppose US sales of weapon systems to the United Arab Emirates.

The establishment of formal diplomatic relations between the two countries was said to be the result, most recently, of cooperation and talks between the UAE's National Security Adviser Tahnoun bin Zayed Al Nahyan and Yossi Cohen, the head of Israel's Mossad.

On 27 October 2025, Israeli state-owned defense company Controp Precision Technologies set up a subsidiary in Abu Dhabi Global Market.

In December 2025, Newsweek, citing Intelligence Online, reported that the United Arab Emirates was the previously undisclosed buyer of a $2.3 billion defense contract with Israeli company Elbit Systems. The deal, first announced in November 2025 as involving an unnamed international customer, is among the largest in the company’s history. Reporting by Almanassa further stated that the agreement includes advanced airborne defense and electronic warfare systems, such as the J-MUSIC directional infrared countermeasure system, and also noted earlier Emirati acquisitions of related Israeli technology. Taken together, the reports have been interpreted as part of a broader pattern of expanding defense and security cooperation between the UAE and Israeli defense firms following the normalization of relations under the Abraham Accords. Separately, the UAE has also continued to expand its airborne early warning and control capabilities, including additional deliveries of Saab GlobalEye aircraft.

During the 2026 Iran war, Israel sent an Iron Dome battery and several troops to the UAE to operate it and defend the country from Iranian missiles, marking the first time the system had been deployed outside Israel and the United States.

== Medical cooperation ==
In July 2020, the Israeli Israel Aerospace Industries and Rafael Advanced Defense Systems signed an agreement with the Emirati Group 42 technology company, to offer "effective solutions" to the COVID-19 pandemic. In June 2020, the UAE's Etihad Airways landed at Ben Gurion Airport, carrying a shipment of medical supplies to assist the Palestinians during the COVID-19 pandemic. Later that month, Israel announced a partnership with the UAE to cooperate in managing the COVID-19 pandemic in their respective countries.

== Cultural and scientific relations ==
In September 2019, the Abu Dhabi announced that they would open a synagogue as part of an interfaith compound by 2022 which also include a church and a mosque. On 17 February 2023, Moses Ben Maimon Synagogue, the first public synagogue in the United Arab Emirates, was officially opened.

On 13 September 2020, UAE's Mohamed bin Zayed University of Artificial Intelligence and Israel's Weizmann Institute of Science signed a Memorandum of Understanding (MoU) to collaborate on AI research.

In January 2021, the Department of Culture and Tourism in Abu Dhabi announced the organization of the first virtual event that brings together Emirati and Israeli filmmakers on the annual "Qattara Cinema" program, under the agreement between the Abu Dhabi Film Committee, the Israeli Film Fund and Sam Spiegel School in Jerusalem, where eight Emirati and Israeli short films will be released.

== Sports events ==
Prior to 2009 the UAE had routeinly denied entry to Israelis as part of the Arab boycott of Israel. However, in 2009, UAE gave Israeli tennis player Andy Ram special permission for admission to the country to play in Dubai Tennis Championships.

In February 2010, Israeli tennis player Shahar Pe'er was denied a visa by the UAE, and thus prevented from playing at the 2009 Dubai Tennis Championships. A number of players, among them Venus Williams, condemned the visa rejection, and Women's Tennis Association chief Larry Scott said that he had considered canceling the tournament, but chose not to after consulting Pe'er. Tournament director Salah Tahlak said that Pe'er was refused on the grounds that her appearance could incite anger in the Arab country, after she had already faced protests at the ASB Classic over the Gaza War. The WTA said that it would review future tournaments in Dubai. Due to the action, Tennis Channel decided not to televise the event and The Wall Street Journal dropped its sponsorship. The 2008 winner of the men's singles Andy Roddick chose not to defend his title, with prize money of over $2 million, to protest against the UAE's refusal to grant Pe'er a visa.

In October 2017, when an Israeli judoka Tal Flicker won gold in an international judo championship in the UAE, officials refused to fly the Israeli flag and play the Israeli national anthem, instead playing the official music of the International Judo Federation (IJF) and flying the IJF's logo. The UAE also banned Israeli athletes from wearing their country's symbols on uniforms, having to wear IJF uniforms. Other contestants such as Gili Cohen received similar treatment. In October 2018, the UAE reversed its position allowing the Israeli flag be displayed and anthem played when an Israeli judoka Sagi Muki won a gold medal in the Judo Grand Competition, with the Israeli Minister of Culture and Sport, Miri Regev, attending the events in Abu Dhabi.

The 2019 AFC Asian Cup held in January 2019 was another turning point. For the first time since the expulsion of Israel from the Asian Football Confederation, the UAE allowed Israeli TV channel, Sport 5, to directly broadcast the tournament held in the country. This was seen as a sign of warming relations between two nations. Sport 5 officially broadcast the opening match between the UAE and Bahrain, and had remained active until the end of the tournament. In March 2019, Israeli athletes participated in the 2019 Special Olympics World Summer Games, held in Abu Dhabi.

On 9 May 2019, the first team sporting match between Israel and the UAE took place at the Netball Europe Open Challenge at the National Sporting Centre in the Isle of Man.

In November 2019, 17-year-old Israeli Alon Leviev won the gold medal in the junior category at the Ju-jitsu World Championship, held in Abu Dhabi. In the same competition, Nimrod Ryder won another gold medal, while Ronnie Nessimian, Meshi Rosenfeld and Roy Dagan won other medals.

In September 2020, Israeli Dia Saba joined Emirati club Al-Nasr, to become the first Israeli to play in the UAE and Gulf States, following the normalization agreement.
