= National Day (United Arab Emirates) =

National day celebrated on 2 December

Eid Al Etihad (Arabic: عيد الاتحاد) National Day of the United Arab Emirates
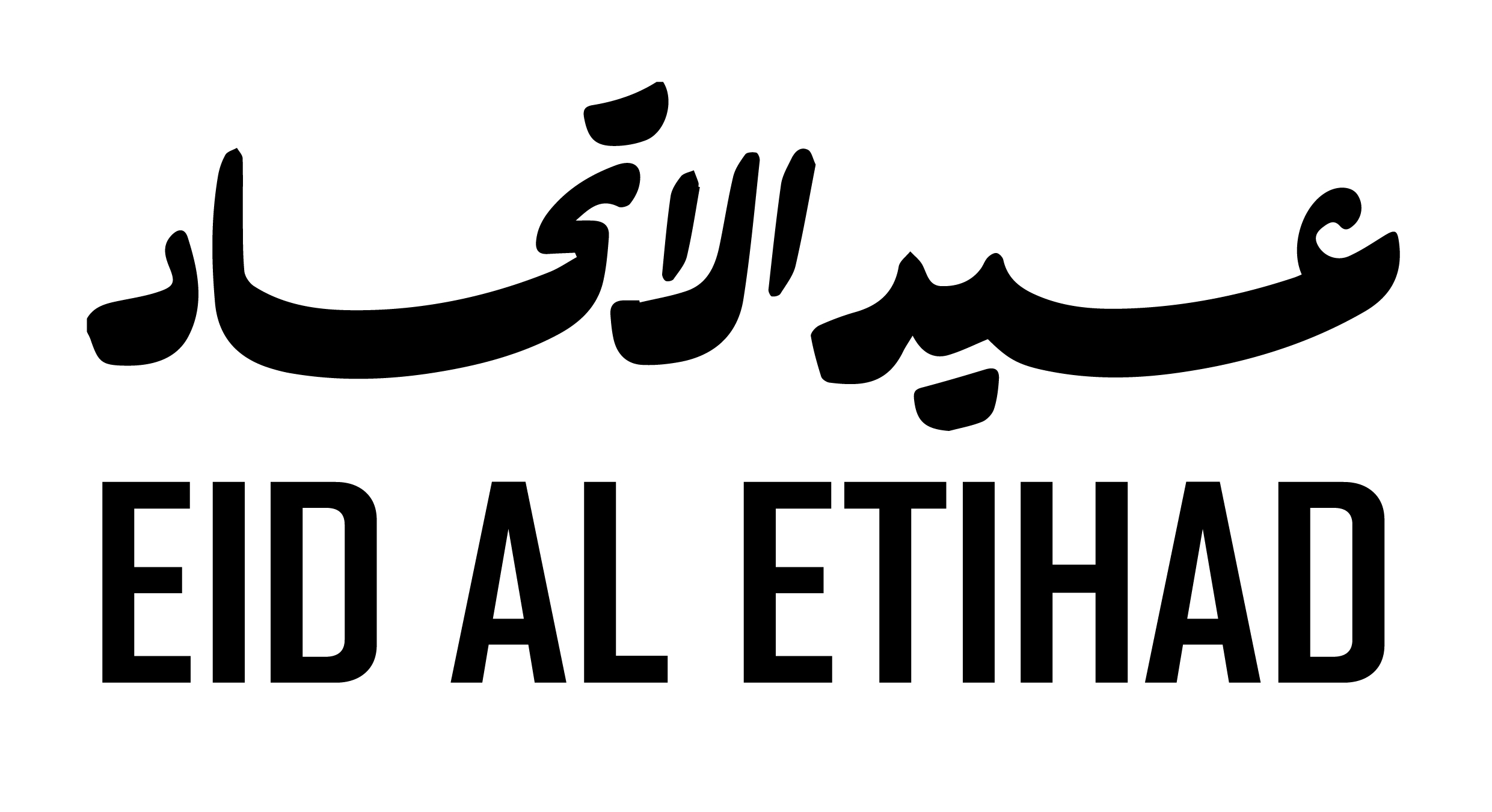
- Official name: Eid Al Etihad (Arabic: اليوم الوطني
- Also called: UAE National Day
- Observed by: United Arab Emirates
- Significance: Marks the establishment of the UAE
- Date: 2 December
- Next time: 2 December 2026
- Frequency: Annual

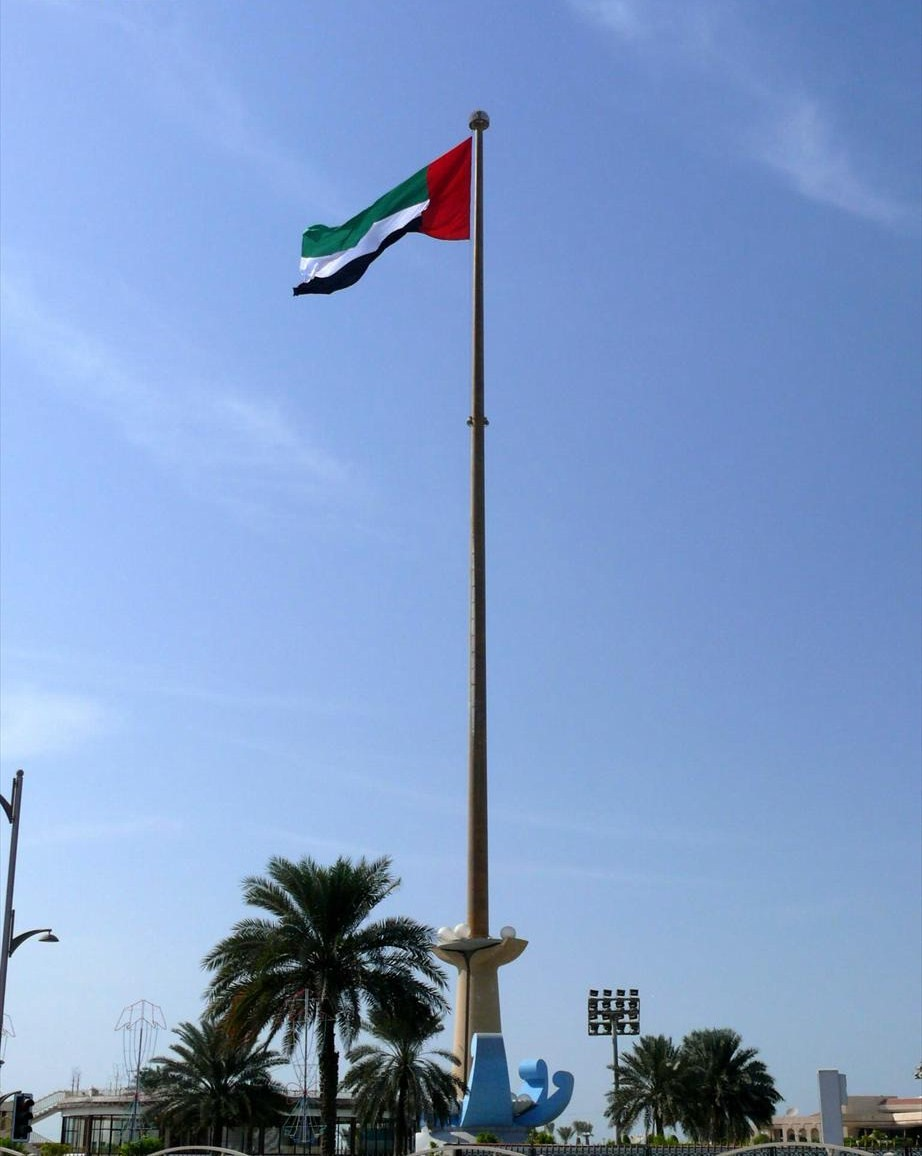
Flag of UAE

Eid Al Etihad (Arabic: عيد الاتحاد), also known as UAE National Day (Arabic: اليوم الوطني; Al Yawm Al Watani"), is celebrated annually on 2 December to celebrate the unification of the United Arab Emirates. The seventh emirate, Ras Al Khaimah, was added to the federation on 10 February 1972 making it the last emirate to join.

== History ==
Before the formation of the UAE, the emirates were part of the Trucial States, a British protectorate established through truce treaties in 1820, 1853 and 1896. In 1968, the British government under the Prime Minister Harold Wilson declared its intention to withdraw its forces east of the Suez, which included its forces in the Trucial States. The British, and Americans, according to leaked diplomatic cables, encouraged some type of union between the emirates, which were seen as weak and surrounded by regional powers in Iran and Saudi Arabia, both of whom have territorial disputes with some of the emirates. The proposed union was at one point set to include Qatar and Bahrain, but those efforts were abandoned with Bahrain declaring independence in August 1971, and Qatar in September 1971. Days prior to the expiration of British treaties on 1 December, the Iranian army supported by the Iranian naval forces occupied the islands of Abu Musa and the Lesser and Greater Tunbs. The UAE declared independence the day after the expiry of the treaties on 2 December, albeit without the emirate of Ras Al Khaimah, which had sided with Saudi Arabia in some of its disputes with the other emirates, and had grievances with the union for establishing relations with Iran despite its occupation of Abu Musa and the Lesser and Greater Tunbs. However, Ras Al Khaimah later joined the union on 10 February 1972. Sheikh Zayed bin Sultan Al Nahyan, was the federation's first president and is regarded as the country's founding father. Recently, the UAE National Day holiday with the Emirati Martyrs' Day on 30 November.

== Celebration ==
In 2026, the UAE celebrates its 55th Eid Al Etihad, marking the country’s history, national identity and unity. Grand celebrations are held across the country to mark the event. Fireworks, car rallies, and dance shows are the most common activities. People will usually dress up in UAE national flag colors and decorate their homes, workplaces, cars, and streets to celebrate the day. Palm trees are decorated with lights in the colors of the flag. Hotels and other public sites are decorated with flags and lights.

Downtown Dubai is often lit with fireworks while the Burj Khalifa displays the UAE flag. It is crowded with people seeking to see the massive National Day fireworks and celebration. Shopping centers, malls, and institutions are also decorated with the flag of the country. Heritage Villages are set all over the UAE in order to celebrate this event traditionally. It is generally a two-day holiday, with 3 December (the day after National Day) also being observed as a public holiday. Air shows are conducted while military processions are held at Abu Dhabi National Exhibition Centre for the rulers of the Emirates, members of the Federal National Council, and Emirati citizens.

The UAE National Day celebrations are marked by grand fireworks displays and spectacular air shows across various emirates. Every year, popular locations like Abu Dhabi Corniche, Dubai Festival City, and Sharjah's Al Majaz Waterfront host breathtaking fireworks, attracting thousands of spectators. The UAE Air Force aerobatic team, Al Fursan, often performs special aerial displays. These events highlight the patriotic spirit of the nation and are a major attraction for both residents and tourists.

== See also ==
- Public holidays in the United Arab Emirates
