= Commemoration Day =

Public holiday in the UAE, 30 November / 1 December

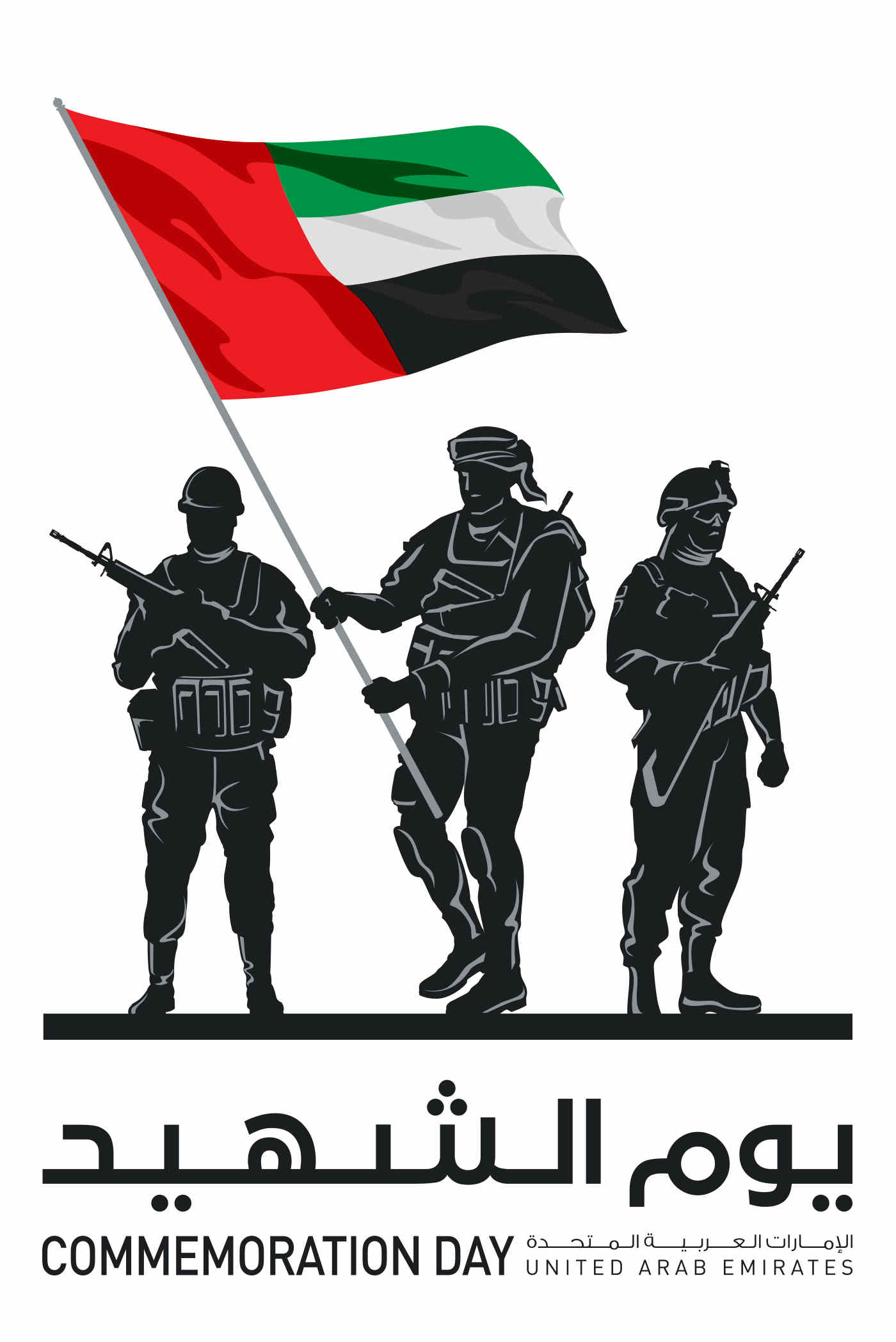
- Also called: Martyrs' Day
- Observed by: United Arab Emirates
- Type: National holiday
- Significance: Remembrance of fallen soldiers
- Observances: A minute's silence on 30 November, and a public holiday on 1 December
- Begins: 30 November
- Ends: 1 December
- Date: 30 November
- Next time: 30 November 2026
- Frequency: Annual
- First time: 2015; 11 years ago
- Started by: Khalifa bin Zayed Al Nahyan

Commemoration Day, also known as Martyrs' Day (Arabic: يوم الشهيد yawm ash-shahiid), is a national holiday in the United Arab Emirates recognizing the sacrifices and dedication of Emirati martyrs who have given their life in the field of civil, military and humanitarian service. The day is marked annually on 30 November, but observed with a public holiday on 1 December. It was declared in 2015, when President of the United Arab Emirates, Sheikh Khalifa Bin Zayed Al Nahyan, declared the day as Martyrs Day in honor of those who sacrificed their lives for the country. Prior to 2019, the observance and public holiday were both held on 30 November.

== History ==
Martyrs date marks the date of the killing of Salem Suhail bin Khamis Al Dahmani, a policeman who was stationed on Greater Tunb island on 30 November 1971, during the seizure of Abu Musa and the Greater and Lesser Tunbs by the Imperial Iranian Army shortly before the UAE’s formation. Al Dahmani led a six-member police force on Greater Tunb, when the island was invaded by Imperial State of Iran on the eve of the declaration of the United Arab Emirates. He refused to lower the flag of Ras Al Khaimah, and he was killed by the Iranian navy.

On 19 August 2015, the date of Al Dahmani's death was announced as Martyrs Day.

== Martyrs timeline ==
The soldiers who fell during the First Gulf War (1990-1991) while liberating Kuwait are remembered alongside martyrs such as Saif Ghobash, a government minister who was assassinated in 1977, and Khalifa Mubarak, an Emirati ambassador who was assassinated in 1984. Others who have died in the line of duty will always be honoured.

=== "Operation Restoring Hope" in Yemen ===
UAE armed forces joined "Operation Restoring Hope" under the Saudi Arabia-led Arab alliance in 2015 to support the Aden-based government recognized by the Persian Gulf states. The number of UAE soldiers martyred in Yemen rose to 45. The UAE government announced a three-day mourning period from September 5, 2015, with flags to be flown at half-mast.

Commemorative and national ceremonies and events will be organised nationwide on December 1. All state institutions, nationals and non-nationals will be engaged to promote, mark and remember the values of sacrifice, dedication and loyalty, of the UAE citizens who sacrificed their lives in battles of heroism, dedication and national duty. The holiday will honour the heroes with nationwide remembrance to those who gave their souls for their homeland. The usual observance in UAE is that all institutions, facilities and all nationals and non-nationals will stand up for a 1-minute silence at 11 AM on 30 November every year. Many people will gather at places where the UAE flag is hoisted at half-mast, like at the Abu Dhabi Corniche and the Union House in Dubai. At 11:01 AM, the flag is raised to the top and the National Anthem "Ishy Bilady"

== Tributes ==
Commemorating the UAE’s fallen heroes on November 30 every year from 2015 will be a tribute to UAE's heroes.

Wahat Al Karama (Arabic: واحة الكرامة), which is also known by its English translation Oasis of Dignity, is a war memorial and monument in Abu Dhabi, United Arab Emirates located across Sheikh Zayed Grand Mosque to commemorate all Emiratis who were killed in the line of duty. The memorial was unveiled on the United Arab Emirates Commemoration Day on 1 December 2016. The memorial is composed of three structures: the leaning pillars, the pavilion of honor, and the memorial plaza. The names of all Emirati soldiers who were killed in duty are inscribed in the pavilion of honor.

Sheikh Sultan bin Mohammed Al Qasimi, the Ruler of Sharjah, ordered that a square be dedicated in honour of the servicemen. Building of a monument is proposed to honour those who died in the line of duty is to be inaugurated on Martyrs’ Day. Sharjah will be installing a martyrs’ monument on Maliha Road, near the Sharjah Centre for Space and Astronomy, and a road in Sharjah University City will be renamed Martyr’s Road.

A martyrs’ square and memorial will be built in Al Alam Park in Ajman.

The road linking the emirates of Fujairah and Ras Al Khaimah, has been renamed as 'Martyrs Street' or 'Shuhada Street' in Arabic, in memory of the martyrs as a tribute.
