= DIFC Courts =

Legal court in Dubai

- محاكم مركز دبي المالي العالمي
- Official Logo of the DIFC Courts
- Established: 2004
- Jurisdiction: Dubai International Financial Centre
- Authorised by: Dubai Law No. (12) of 2004
- Website: https://www.difccourts.ae/

Chief Justice
- Currently: H.E. Justice Wayne Martin
- Since: September 2024

Deputy Chief Justice
- Currently: H.E. Justice Ali Shamis Al Madhani
- Since: July 2022

The DIFC Courts are an independent English language common law judiciary, based in the Dubai International Financial Centre (DIFC) with jurisdiction governing civil and commercial disputes nationally, regionally and worldwide. The Courts began operations in 2006.

Originally, the jurisdiction of the DIFC Courts was limited to the geographical area of the DIFC. On 31 October 2011, the signing of Dubai Law No. (16) of 2011. allowed the DIFC Courts to hear any local or international cases and to resolve commercial disputes with the consent of all parties.

The DIFC Courts are part of the sovereign structure of the Emirate of Dubai, within the UAE and independent from the Dubai Courts and Government of Dubai. Specifically, Dubai Law No.12 of 2004 ('Dubai Law No.12') is the governing statute which originally established the DIFC Judicial Authority (including the two DIFC Courts, the Court of First Instance and the Court of Appeal).

== History ==
In September 2004, Federal legislation of the UAE authorised the seven Emirates to create the legal structures necessary for international financial centres to be established. The then Ruler of Dubai, Sheikh Maktoum Bin Rashid Al Maktoum, enacted Dubai Law No. (9) of 2004 ('Dubai Law No.9') and appointed His Highness Sheikh Mohammed Bin Rashid Al Maktoum (then Crown Prince of Dubai) as President of the DIFC.

The Dubai Law No.9 provided that the Centre had three constituent bodies - the DIFC authority (DIFCA); the Dubai Financial Services Authority (DFSA) and the DIFC Judicial Authority (now known as DIFC Courts).

== Jurisdiction ==
The DIFC Courts have jurisdiction over most civil and commercial matters occurring within the DIFC (alongside their international jurisdiction). This means that, where DIFC Courts have jurisdiction, such jurisdiction will exclude the jurisdiction of the Dubai Courts. Parties are free to agree to submit to the jurisdiction of any other court under Article 5(2) of Dubai Law No. (12) of 2004 (except for objections filed against decisions made by the Centre's Bodies, which are subject to objection in accordance with the Centre's Laws and Regulations).

DIFC Courts areas of law
Companies Law
Contract Law
Arbitration Law
Insolvency Law
Data Protection Law
Collective Investment Law
Employment Law
Investment Trust Law
Single Family Office
Special Purpose Company Regulations
Payment Systems Settlement Finality Law
Preferential Creditor Regulations
Strata Title Law
Trust Law

The DIFC Courts have no jurisdiction over criminal matters and all criminal matters continue to be referred to the Dubai Public Prosecution and heard at the Dubai Courts. The DIFC Courts also have no jurisdiction over family and matrimonial matters.

=== Legislation and rules ===
The DIFC laws and regulations are developed by the DIFC Authority (DIFCA) and the Dubai Financial Services Authority (DFSA). The DIFCA is responsible for the laws and regulations that regulate the non-financial activities within the DIFC, including employment law, companies and commercial law and real estate law. The DFSA is responsible for the laws and regulations relating to the all financial and ancillary services within the DIFC.

The DIFC Courts apply the DIFC's laws and regulations, unless the parties explicitly agree that another law governs their dispute.

=== Judgments, orders and enforcement ===
The DIFC Courts have the power to make orders and give directions as to the conduct of any proceeding before the DIFC Courts that it considers appropriate, including:-

- Orders prescribed by any legislation under DIFC law;
- Injunctions, including requiring an act to be done;
- Interim or interlocutory Orders;
- Orders made without notice to any other party and the circumstances in which such Orders are appropriate;
- Contempt Orders;
- Orders made in the interest of justice or
- Referral of matters to the Attorney General of Dubai

The DIFC Courts have the power to enforce Judgments, Orders or Awards made or ratified by the DIFC Courts within the DIFC. The Chief Justice shall appoint a Judge of the First Instance Court as an Executive Judge with the jurisdiction to issue Execution Orders within the DIFC.

=== Court of First Instance ===
Hears cases where the amount in dispute exceeds Dhs 100, 000. A single Judge hears the proceedings. The Court of First Instance has exclusive jurisdiction over any civil or commercial case when it relates to the DIFC, and following the amendment to the governing law in October 2011, DIFC Courts can also hear cases when the contract in question specifies DIFC Courts' jurisdiction (pre-dispute jurisdiction) or when both parties elect to use DIFC Courts to resolve a dispute which has already arisen (post-dispute jurisdiction). This is commonly referred to as 'opt-in' jurisdiction.

=== Court of Appeal ===
Deals with a variety of civil and commercial disputes. It comprises at least three judges, with the Chief Justice. The Court of Appeal A has exclusive jurisdiction over:

1. Appeals filed against judgments and awards made by the Court of First Instance.
2. Interpretation of any article of the DIFC's laws based upon the request of any of the DIFC's establishments, provided that the establishment obtains leave of the Chief Justice in this regard. Such interpretation shall have the power of law.
3. The Court of Appeal is the highest court in the DIFC Courts and no appeal shall arise from a decision of this court.

=== Small Claims Tribunal ===
The only operating tribunal of its kind in the region, the Small Claims Tribunal was set up to enable access to justice in a swift and efficient manner. It can hear:

Any case that is related to the DIFC, where the amount of the claim or the value of the subject matter of the claim does not exceed AED100,000 or AED200,000 for employment matters; or

- A case in which the claim pertains to an employment issue of any amount and both parties to the claim elect in writing that it be heard by the Small Claims Tribunal; or
- Non-employment related cases where the amount of the claim or the value of the subject-matter of the claim does not exceed AED500,000; and all parties to the claim elect in writing that it be heard by the Small Claims Tribunal.
- Any case that is not related to the DIFC, where both parties consent to using the Small Claims Tribunal and either i) where the amount of the claim or the value of the subject matter of the claim does not exceed AED 500,000 or ii) where the claim is related to an employment issue of any claim amount.

== Pro bono ==
The DIFC Courts implemented the Middle East's first Pro Bono Programme in 2009. The Courts offer services from basic advice to full case management and representation in proceedings for eligible individuals. The Pro Bono Programme is designed to ensure that professional legal advice is available to anyone who can demonstrate that they are unable to afford legal representation.

== Courts Users' Committee ==
The DIFC Courts' Users' Committee is a liaison between the DIFC Courts and the users of the Court (these include legal practitioners registered with the Courts). The Committee advises on performance, perceived reputation, strategic direction, international best practice, as well as local legal developments. The Committee advises the Chief Justice about administrative issues related to the Courts and any other appropriate issues which will help increase the level of users' satisfaction.

Judicial Bench
H.E. Justice Wayne Martin, Australia (Chief Justice)
H.E. Justice Ali Shamis Al Madhani, UAE (Deputy Chief Justice)
H.E. Justice Omar Al Mheiri, UAE
H.E. Justice Shamlan Al Sawalehi, UAE
H.E. Justice Sir Jeremy Cooke, England & Wales
H.E. Justice Robert French, Australia
H.E. Justice Lord Angus Glennie, Scotland
H.E. Justice Sir Peter Gross, England & Wales
H.E. Justice Michael Black, England & Wales
H.E. Justice Rene Le Miere, Australia
H.E. Justice Tom Bathurst, Australia
H.E. Justice Andrew Moran, England & Wales
H.E. Justice Roger Stewart, England & Wales
H.E. Justice Sapna Jhangiani, England & Wales
H.E. Justice Patrick Keane, Australia
H.E. Justice Mark Pelling, England & Wales
H.E. Justice Dato’ Mary Lim Thiam Suan, Malaysia

Small Claims Tribunal Judges
H.E. Justice Nassir Al Nasser, UAE
H.E. Justice Maha Al Mheiri, UAE

Executive Team	
Director	H.E. Justice Omar Al Mheiri
Deputy Director	Amna Al Owais
Chief Operating Officer	Reem Al Shihhe

Registrars	
Registrar	Ayesha Bin Kalban
Assistant Registrar	Delvin Sumo
Assistant Registrar	Hayley Norton

== Wills Service Centre ==
The DIFC Wills Service Centre (the "Wills Service") is a joint initiative of the Government of Dubai and the DIFC Courts that gives non-Muslims investing and living in the UAE the option to pass on their assets and/or appoint guardians for their children, in accordance with the instructions in their will.

The Wills Service was established by Resolution No. 4 of 2014 issued by His Highness Sheikh Maktoum bin Mohammed bin Rashid Al Maktoum, the President of the Dubai International Financial Centre (DIFC), and its authority re-affirmed by Dubai Law No. 15 of 2017 issued by his Highness Sheikh Mohammed bin Rashid Al Maktoum, Vice-President and Prime Minister of the UAE and Ruler of Dubai, regulating inheritance, wills and probate for non-Muslims.
