= Mahmoud al-Mabhouh =

Hamas commander (1960–2010)

Mahmoud Abdel Rauf al-Mabhouh
- محمود عبد الرؤوف المبحوح
- Mahmoud al-Mabhouh
- Born: 14 February 1960; Jabalia Camp, Gaza Strip
- Died: 19 January 2010 (aged 49); Dubai, United Arab Emirates
- Burial place: Damascus, Syria
- Military career
- Allegiance: Hamas
- Rank: Chief Logistics Officer

Mahmoud Abdel Rauf al-Mabhouh (Arabic: محمود عبد الرؤوف المبحوح; 14 February 1960 – 19 January 2010) was the chief of logistics and weapons procurement for Hamas's military wing, the Izz ad-Din al-Qassam Brigades. He is remembered for his assassination in Dubai (widely seen as an operation by Mossad, the Israeli foreign intelligence agency) and the diplomatic crisis his assassination triggered after Mossad agents allegedly used forged foreign passports to carry out the killing.

As Hamas's logistics officer, Al-Mabhouh oversaw the transfer of advanced weapons from Iran such as anti tank missiles, guided missiles and rockets to Hamas in Gaza for the purpose of targeting Israel. He also planned the abduction and killing of two Israeli soldiers in Gaza in 1989. In more recent years, al-Mabhouh had played an important role in procuring weapons for the al-Qassam Brigades. In 2010, journalists Yossi Melman and Dan Raviv alleged that al-Mabhouh had played a vital role as the middleman in forging secret relationships between Hamas and the Quds Force in Iran.

Al-Mabhouh was killed in the five-star Al Bustan Rotana Hotel in Dubai, United Arab Emirates, on 19 January 2010, having arrived in the country earlier that day from Syria under an alias and using one of several passports. According to police, al-Mabhouh was drugged, electrocuted and then suffocated with a pillow. Widespread speculation, which Dubai police allegations support, is that he was killed by Israeli Mossad agents. Allegations that the agents used fraudulently obtained passports from several countries led to the arrests and expulsions of several Israeli officials and diplomats in several European countries and Australia.

== Biography ==
Al-Mabhouh was born in Jabalia refugee camp, Gaza Strip, on 14 February 1960. As a young man, he pursued weightlifting. He quit secondary school, trained as a car mechanic and later became a garage owner. Al-Mabhouh had 13 siblings, and was a married father of four. One of his brothers was Fayeq Al-Mabhouh, chief for internal operations of Gaza Strip police until his death in Al-Shifa Hospital siege (Note: https://aja.ws/7ff59c)

In the 1970s, al-Mabhouh joined the Muslim Brotherhood, and in the 1980s, he was reported to have been involved in sabotaging coffee shops where gambling was taking place. In 1986, the Israeli security forces arrested him for possession of an assault rifle. It has been reported that after his release, he became involved with Hamas. According to Hamas, al-Mabhouh was personally responsible for the abduction and killing of the Israeli soldiers Avi Sasportas and Ilan Sa'adon in 1989. In a video taped two weeks before his death and broadcast on Al Jazeera in early February 2010, al-Mabhouh admitted his involvement in this event, saying he had disguised himself as an Orthodox Jew. In May 1989, a failed attempt was made to arrest him for his involvement in the murder of the two Israeli soldiers and he subsequently left the Gaza Strip; his home in Gaza was demolished by Israel in 1989 as retribution for the attack.

According to a report in The Palestine Chronicle, al-Mabhouh had survived two assassination attempts; the first was a car bombing; the second took place in Beirut in 2009 and involved the use of radioactive poison which rendered him unconscious for 30 hours. He spent most of 2003 in an Egyptian jail. At the time of his death, al-Mabhouh was wanted by the Israeli, Egyptian and Jordanian governments, and living in Syria. Just before his killing, al-Mabhouh was alleged to have played a key role in forging secret connections between the Hamas government in Gaza and the Al-Quds Force of the Revolutionary Guard in Iran. Mabhouh's nephew Ahmad also joined Hamas and became an engineering and sabotage officer in a Hamas unit near Jabaliya. He was assassinated in an Israeli attack during the 2014 Israel-Gaza conflict.

== Death ==
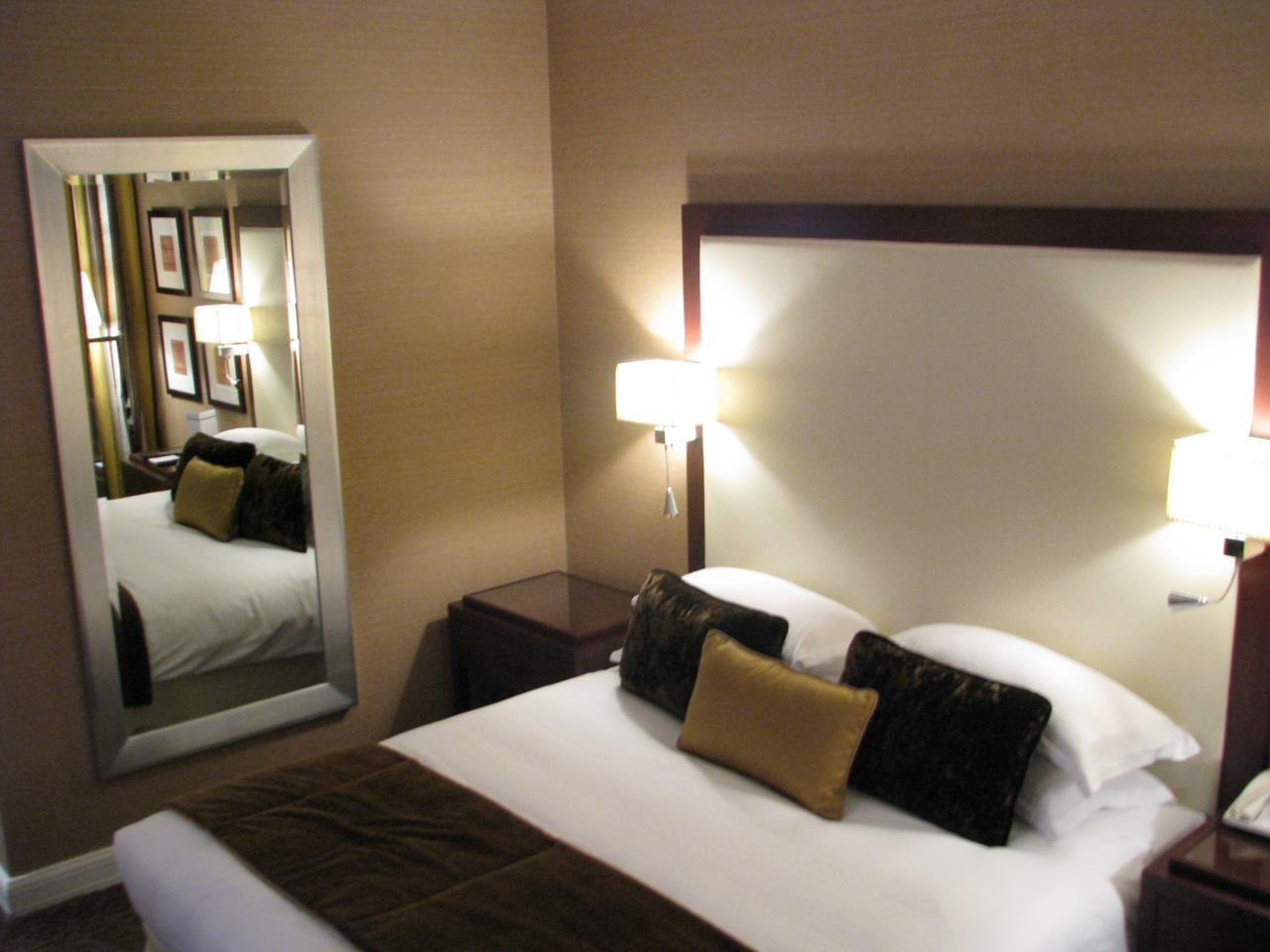
An Al Bustan Rotana Hotel room in Dubai.

On 19 January 2010, al-Mabhouh was killed in his room in a hotel in Dubai. He had been followed by at least eleven Mossad agents who were carrying fake or fraudulently obtained passports from various Western countries, seven of which assumed the names of Israeli dual citizens. Reports indicated that al-Mabhouh was very closely tracked by his killers from Damascus airport to Dubai. He was travelling without bodyguards, and was en route to Bangkok. Although it was reported that he carried five passports under different names, Hamas officials in Syria reportedly stated that at this time he was using a passport issued in his own name.

He checked into the Al Bustan Rotana hotel on the afternoon of 19 January. He left the hotel about an hour after check-in, and there were conflicting reports as to what he did during the few hours before he was killed. At approximately 8:25 p.m. Al-Mabhouh went back to his room. He failed to answer a call from his wife a half-hour later. According to Dubai Police Force, he was dead by 9 p.m. that evening.

On 20 January, day after his death, his body was found in his hotel room. The door was locked from the inside. al-Mabhouh's body was transported to Damascus for burial. Hotel CCTV surveillance footage released to the public shows the agents, who had arrived on separate flights, meeting in the hotel. While the men used encrypted personal communication devices among themselves to avoid surveillance, a number of telephone calls were made to a number in Austria. When al-Mabhouh arrived at around 3 p.m., two of the agents on CCTV followed him to his room wearing tennis gear. They then checked into the room opposite al-Mabhouh's. At 8 p.m. al-Mabhouh left the hotel and while several of the suspects kept watch, two tried to gain entry to his room, but were disturbed when a tourist exited the nearby lift. While another agent distracted the tourist, the other four entered his hotel room using an advanced electronic device and waited for him to return. Hotel computer logs indicated that they successfully reprogrammed al-Mabhouh's hotel door lock at this time.

=== Cause of death ===
Initially, Dubai authorities believed al-Mabhouh had died of natural causes. Although the Dubai police investigation and final report on the matter would not be ready until the beginning of March, a preliminary forensic report found that al-Mabhouh was first paralyzed by an injection of succinylcholine (suxamethonium), a fast-acting muscle relaxant, then electrocuted, and suffocated with a pillow. Succinylcholine incapacitates by inducing (muscle) paralysis, but does not sedate. Signs strongly indicate that al-Mabhouh attempted to resist as he was being killed. Dubai authorities stated they were ruling the death a homicide and were working with the International Criminal Police Organization (Interpol) to investigate the incident.

=== Suspects ===
Lieutenant general Dhahi Khalfan Tamim, Chief of the Dubai Police Force, announced on 18 February 2010 that, "Our investigations reveal that Mossad was definitely involved in the murder of al-Mabhouh ... It is 99% if not 100% that Mossad is standing behind the murder." Dubai police said the killers spent little time in the country, arriving less than a day before the murder, killing al-Mabhouh between his arrival at 3:15 p.m. and 9 p.m. that night, and leaving the country before the discovery of the murder.

The Israeli government initially denied and did not comment on claims that it was involved in Al-Mabhouh's death. On 17 February, Foreign Minister Avigdor Lieberman refused to confirm or deny any Israeli involvement, citing Israel's "policy of ambiguity" on such matters, and claimed a lack of evidence for Israeli intelligence involvement. Lieberman even declared that the press "watch too many James Bond movies". Later, Israeli Deputy Foreign Minister Danny Ayalon said "there is nothing linking Israel to the assassination." However, Israeli media and public opinion have generally accepted Mossad's responsibility for the operation.

The identities used by eleven of the agents have been publicly identified, based on passports that the Dubai police said were not forgeries, though both the British and Irish governments said the passports bearing their countries' names were "either fraudulently obtained or [are] outright fakes." The total number of suspects stands at eighteen, all of whom entered the country using fake or fraudulently obtained passports. Passports used by the killers were from the United Kingdom (6), Republic of Ireland (5), Australia (3), France (1 – suspected of being the hit squad leader and logistical coordinator), and Germany (1).

The names used on the six UK passports and the German passport belong to individuals who live in Israel and hold dual citizenships. The photographs of eleven of the operatives were added to Interpol's most wanted list on 18 February, with a note specifying that they had been published since the identities used by the agents were fake. Dubai security officials carried out routine retinal scans on eleven of the suspects sought in the assassination when they entered the country and Dubai police said they would publish the scans through Interpol.

Two Palestinians, Ahmad Hasnin, an intelligence officer of the Fatah-controlled Palestinian Authority (PA), and Anwar Shekhaiber, an PA official in Ramallah, were arrested in Jordan and handed over to Dubai, suspected of giving logistical and intelligence assistance. Hamas said the two were former Fatah security officials who both worked at a construction company in Dubai owned by Mohammed Dahlan, another senior Fatah security official, and that they rented cars and hotel rooms for members of the Mossad hit team alleged to have carried out the killing. Dahlan and Fatah denied the charges. Ahmad Hasnin came to the UAE in 2008, according to a family source. On 19 February, Dubai police chief Dahi Khalfan Tamim called for Interpol to issue an Interpol red notice to approve the arrest of Israeli Mossad chief Meir Dagan, causing the Israeli government to deny he has enough proof.

=== Mossad agent arrested ===
In early June 2010, German prosecutors announced that at Germany's request Polish authorities had arrested a suspected Mossad agent thought to have played a role in the Dubai assassination of a high ranking Hamas leader. A spokesman for German federal prosecution said, "He was arrested in Warsaw and is suspected of being involved in illegally obtaining a [German] passport", confirming a report in the German magazine Der Spiegel.

=== Western government reactions ===
In the wake of the revelation that passports of British citizens had figured prominently in the operation, the United Kingdom's Serious Organised Crime Agency launched its own investigation into the matter. The British Foreign Office also summoned the Israeli ambassador on 18 February to share information on the matter. Britain's Foreign Office believes that the passports used were fraudulent; one report indicated that they had issued the passports in January 2010, the only difference between the actual identities being the photographs.

Ireland's Department of Foreign Affairs declared that eight supposedly Irish passports used by the suspects were forged. On 15 June, following an extensive investigation, the Department of Foreign Affairs came to "the inescapable conclusion that an Israeli government agency was responsible for the misuse and, most likely, the manufacture of the forged Irish passports associated with the murder of Mr. Mabhouh." The government's immediate diplomatic reaction was that "Israel be requested to withdraw a designated member of staff of its Embassy in Dublin." The Irish Minister for Foreign Affairs Micheál Martin said Israel's action were "clearly unacceptable".

According to a spokesman of the French Foreign Affairs Ministry, the French passport was counterfeit. The Israeli chargé d'affaires in Paris was summoned on 18 February and the French Foreign Ministry issued a statement expressing, "deep concern about the malicious and fraudulent use of these French administrative documents." German officials said that the passport number which they received from the authorities in Dubai is either incomplete or does not exist.

After learning of the alleged use of Australian passports by Mossad, the Australian Foreign Minister, Stephen Smith, publicly summoned the Israeli ambassador to Australia, Yuval Rotem. Smith told the ambassador that if Israel was responsible for the passport forgeries that "Australia would not regard that as the act of a friend." Soon after this occurred, Australia, who is usually a strong supporter of Israel at the United Nations, abstained on a UN motion to investigate Israeli war crimes committed during the Gaza War, a motion that Australia had previously opposed. In the Australian press there was widespread speculation that the move was retaliation for the passport affair.

Australian and British investigators came to Israel to investigate the case. In May 2010, after receiving the final results of the investigation, foreign minister, Stephen Smith told Federal Parliament that the Australian government was "in no doubt that Israel was responsible for the abuse and counterfeiting of [Australian] passports." Australia ceased co-operation with Israeli intelligence and expelled Israeli diplomat Eli Elkoubi. In June, The Canberra Times revealed that Elkoubi was an officer of Mossad leading Israeli diplomats to complain that the disclosure was a further act of retaliation.

=== American refusal to cooperate with investigation ===
After al-Mabhouh's death, the United Arab Emirates requested that the U.S. assist it in tracking down "cardholder details and related information for credit cards reportedly issued by a U.S. bank to several suspects." The U.S. denied receiving the request. A leaked cable sent from the U.S. consulate in Dubai showed that the U.S. declined the UAE request.
