= Assassination of Mahmoud Al-Mabhouh =

2010 murder in Dubai, United Arab Emirates

Assassination of Mahmoud al-Mabhouh
- Location: Dubai, United Arab Emirates
- Date: 19 January 2010
- Target: Mahmoud al-Mabhouh
- Attack type: Assassination
- Weapons: Pillow, muscle relaxant
- Deaths: 1
- Perpetrators: 29 reported suspects

The assassination of Mahmoud al-Mabhouh (Arabic: محمود المبحوح, Maḥmūd al-Mabḥūḥ; 14 February 1961 – 19 January 2010) took place on 19 January 2010, in a hotel room in Dubai. Al-Mabhouh—a co-founder of the Izz ad-Din al-Qassam Brigades, the military wing of Hamas—was wanted by the Israeli government for the kidnapping and murder of two Israeli soldiers in 1989 as well as purchasing arms from Iran for use in Gaza; these have been cited as a possible motive for the assassination. His assassination attracted international attention in part due to allegations that it was ordered by the Israeli government and carried out by Mossad agents holding fake or fraudulently obtained passports from several European countries and Australia.

The photographs of the 26 suspects and their aliases were subsequently placed on Interpol's most-wanted list. The Dubai police found that 12 of the suspects used British passports, along with six Irish, four French, one German, and three Australian passports. Interpol and the Dubai police believed that the suspects stole the identities of real people, mostly Israeli dual citizens. Two Palestinians, believed by Hamas to be former Fatah security officers and current employees of a senior Fatah official, were taken into custody in Dubai, on suspicions that one of them provided logistical assistance to the hit team. Despite Hamas's claim, Dubai would not comment on the incident or identify the two Palestinian suspects.

According to initial reports, Al-Mabhouh was drugged, then electrocuted and suffocated. Lt. Gen. Dhahi Khalfan Tamim of the Dubai Police Force said the suspects tracked Al-Mabhouh to Dubai from Damascus, Syria. They arrived from different European destinations and stayed at different hotels, presumably to avoid being detected and, with the exception of three of its members suspected of "helping to facilitate" who had left on a ferry for Iran several months before the assassination, departed after the assassination to different countries. Dubai's police chief said that he was "99% certain" that the assassination was the work of Israel's Mossad. On 1 March 2010, he stated that he was "sure" that all of the suspects are hiding in Israel.

He said that Dubai would ask for an arrest warrant to be issued for Meir Dagan, the head of Mossad, if it is confirmed that the Mossad is involved and responsible for the assassination. The Hamas leadership also holds Israel responsible, and has vowed revenge. Hamas, which is itself on the U.S. State Department list of Foreign Terrorist Organizations, European Union lists of terrorist organizations, and also considered a terrorist organization by the governments of Israel, and Japan, as is its military arm by the United Kingdom and Australia, requested that Israel be added by the EU to its list because of suspicions that Israel was involved in the assassination.

Later in March, Dubai police chief said, "I am now completely sure that it was Mossad", and went on to say "I have presented the (Dubai) prosecutor with a request for the arrest of (Israeli Prime Minister Benjamin) Netanyahu and the head of Mossad" for the assassination. Khalfan would also suggest that a Hamas associate fed information to Mossad. This was denied by Hamas which blamed Fatah for helping the Mossad hit team. Also in March 2010, the British foreign secretary, David Miliband, expelled an Israeli diplomat after the UK's Serious Organised Crime Agency discovered that Israel had forged copies of British passports. On 24 May, the Australian government expelled an Israeli diplomat after concluding that there was "no doubt Israel was behind the forgery of four Australian passports" related to the assassination. Similar action was taken by Ireland. Israel has refused to comment on the accusations that its security forces were behind the assassination. On 30 September 2010, Dubai's police chief Dahi Khalfan said he received death threats from Israel's spy agency Mossad linked to his role in uncovering details of the assassination of al-Mabhouh, but whether such calls existed remains unconfirmed.

== Sequence of events ==
Timeline of key events
	19 January 2010
02:29:	Team leader arrives in Dubai
15:25:	Mabhouh arrives at hotel
15:51:	Team reserves opposite room
16:23:	Mabhouh exits hotel
20:24:	Mabhouh comes back to hotel
	Mabhouh is killed
20:46:	Team begins to leave hotel
	20 January 2010
13:51:	Body of Mabhouh discovered

On 19 January 2010, al-Mabhouh was assassinated in his Dubai hotel room after being tracked by at least 29 suspects, of whom 26 carried forged or fraudulently-obtained passports from various European nations (whose passport photos were released), along with two Palestinians since arrested, and another unnamed suspect.

The Sunday Times reported that al-Mabhouh's departure from Damascus to Dubai on Emirates Flight no. 912 at 10:05 on 19 January 2010 was tracked by an agent on the ground in Damascus. Salah Bardawil, a Hamas legislator, said al-Mabhouh put himself at risk by booking his trip online and informing family in Gaza of the telephone number of the hotel at which he would be staying on his trip.

Despite reports that al-Mabhouh traveled under a false passport with the fake name "Mahmoud Abdul Raouf Mohammed", Hamas and Dubai officials maintain that he entered the country under his own identity at 15:15. Normally, al-Mabhouh would have been protected by bodyguards, but their arrival was delayed because the guards could not get tickets for the same flight, because "[T]here was no room for them on the flight", said Talal Nasser, a spokesman for Hamas in Damascus. "Therefore, he traveled alone, and the security guards were slated to join him the next day."

According to a 2018 article by Le Monde citing senior French intelligence officials, the Mossad ran the operation to kill Mabhouh out of Paris. The Mossad allegedly set up a makeshift command and control center in a hotel in the Bercy neighborhood of Paris equipped with computers and secure phones. Dubai's police chief, Lt Gen Dahi Khalfan Tamim, stated that al-Mabhouh was transiting in Dubai before traveling to China. Upon arrival in Dubai, al-Mabhouh took a taxi to the Al Bustan Rotana Hotel and settled into room 230. He had asked for a room with no balcony and sealed windows, so no one could enter other than through the door. He left the hotel between 16:30 and 17:00, roughly an hour after checking in. What he did during the next three to four hours remains unclear. Dubai's police chief said he did not meet anyone in the emirate and that he went shopping. Meanwhile, the hit squad broke into his room. At 20:24 al-Mabhouh came back to the room, and subsequently failed to answer a call from his wife half an hour later.

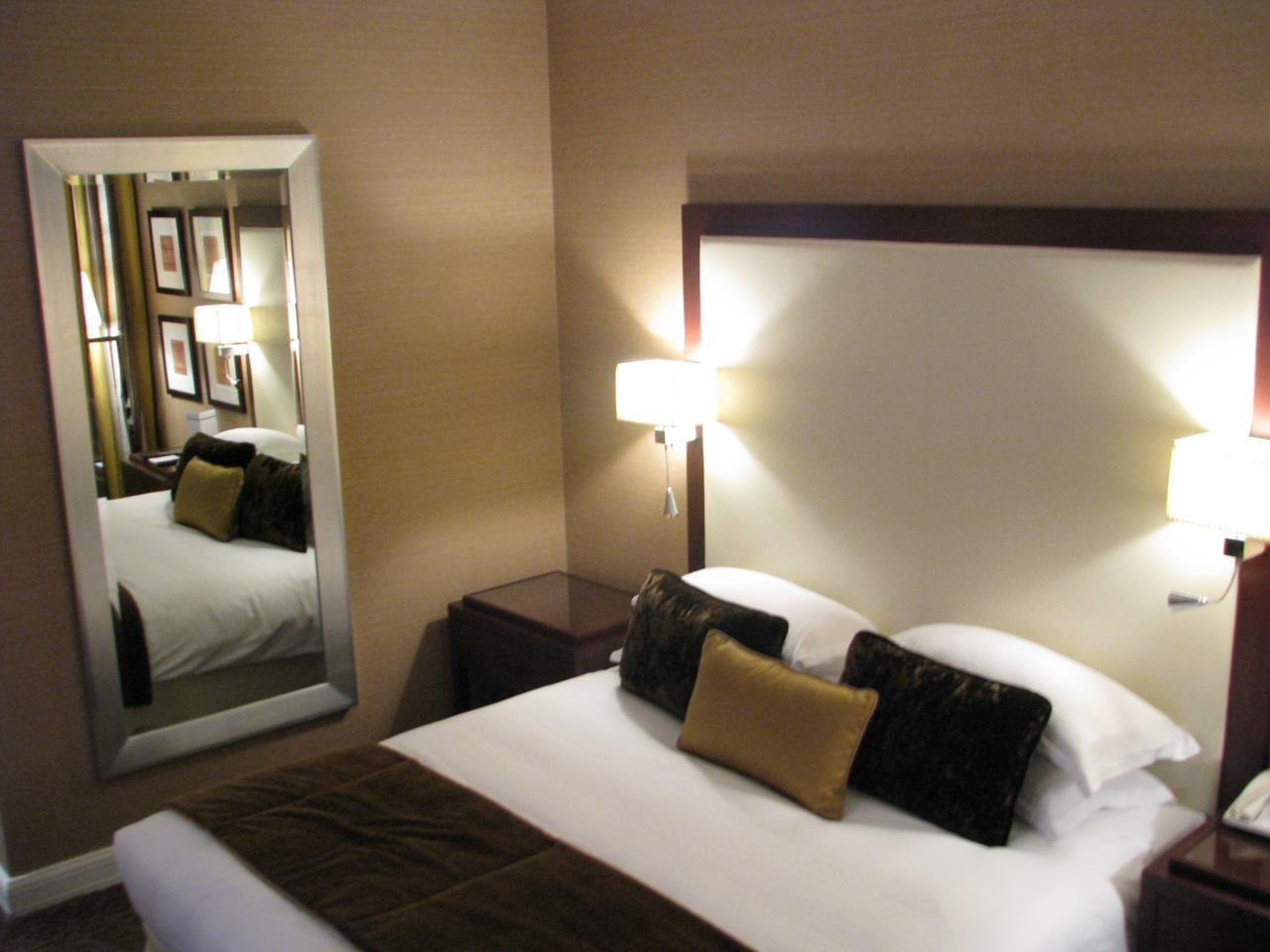
An Al Bustan Rotana Hotel room

Hotel surveillance footage was released to the public showing the suspects, who had arrived on separate flights, meeting in the hotel. While the suspects apparently used personal encrypted communication devices among themselves to avoid surveillance, the suspects were alleged by Dubai police to have sent and received a number of SMS messages to telephone numbers in Austria. When al-Mabhouh arrived around 15:00, two suspects dressed in tennis attire followed him to determine which room he had checked into, as well as the number of the room immediately across the hall. One of the lookout suspects could be seen on video delaying a tourist who exits the elevator on the second floor at this time, apparently to give other team members time to act. Investigators believe the electronic lock on al-Mabhouh's door may have been reprogrammed and that the killers gained entry to his room this way. The locks in question, VingCard Locklink brand, can be accessed and reprogrammed directly at the hotel room door. According to Dubai Police, he was dead by 21:00 that evening.

On 20 January 2010 (the following day), a hotel cleaner attempted to gain entry, but found the door was locked from the inside. Hotel security was then called in to open the door. After the door was opened, al-Mabhouh's body was discovered on the bed. On the drawer next to the bed, the assassins had placed a small bottle of medicine to make it appear as if he had died of natural causes.

== Investigation ==
=== Cause of death ===
Initially, Dubai authorities believed al-Mabhouh had died of natural causes. Fawzi Benomran, the Dubai police coroner, said, "It was meant to look like death from natural causes during sleep." It took 10 days for the Dubai police to come to the conclusion that al-Mabhouh was assassinated. Benomran described the determination of the exact cause of death as "one of the most challenging cases" his department faced. The Khaleej Times quoted an unnamed senior police official as saying that four masked assailants had shocked al-Mabhouh's legs before using a pillow to suffocate him. Another story reported by Uzi Mahnaimi stated that a hit team murdered al-Mabhouh with a heart-attack inducing drug, then proceeded to take photographs of his documents before leaving.

Al-Mabhouh's family said that medical teams who examined his body determined that he died in his hotel room after being strangled and receiving a massive electric shock to the head, and that blood samples examined by a French laboratory confirms that electrocution was the cause of death. According to Reuters news agency, traces of poison were found in al Mabhouh's autopsy. Dubai authorities stated they were ruling the death a homicide and were working with the International Criminal Police Organization to investigate the incident.

Other news reports gave varying causes of death, including suffocation with a pillow and poisoning. In an international press conference General Tamim, the head of the investigation, said that the exact cause of death is yet to be concluded. Moreover, on 1 March 2010, the Dubai Police stated that he was first drugged. Major General Khamis Mattar al-Mazeina as the deputy commander of Dubai's police gave details of the death of al-Mabhouh after forensic tests. Al-Mabhouh was injected in his leg with succinylcholine, a quick-acting, depolarizing paralytic muscle relaxant. It causes almost-instant loss of motor skills, but does not induce loss of consciousness or anaesthesia. Then, al-Mabhouh was suffocated. Al-Mazeina said, "The assassins used this method so that it would seem that his death was natural."

=== Suspects ===
Dubai's police chief, Lt. Gen. Dhahi Khalfan Tamim, announced his preliminary conclusions on 18 February that, "Our investigations reveal that Mossad is involved in the murder of al-Mabhouh ... It is 99% if not 100% that Mossad is standing behind the murder." After identifying the assumed names and photographs of 11 suspects, on 20 February 2010, he said his force had evidence directly incriminating the Mossad in the murder, adding that among the new evidence available were telephone communications between the suspected killers. On 24 February 2010, Dubai police identified 15 additional persons suspected of being involved in al-Mabhouh's assassination. According to journalist Uzi Mahnaimi, the decision to kill al-Mabhouh was authorized by Israel's Prime Minister, Benjamin Netanyahu, after being suggested by Meir Dagan, the head of the Mossad, at a meeting in early January 2010. Later in March, Dubai police chief said "I am now completely sure that it was Mossad," and furthermore went on to say "I have presented the (Dubai) prosecutor with a request for the arrest of (Israeli Prime Minister Benjamin) Netanyahu and the head of Mossad," for the murder of Mahmoud al-Mabhouh.

Dubai police said the assassins spent little time in the emirate, arriving less than a day before the assassination, killing al-Mabhouh between his arrival at 3:15 p.m. and 9 p.m. that night, and subsequently leaving the country before his discovery. The identities used by 11 of the suspects have been made public. The total number of suspects stands at 18, all of whom entered the country using fake or fraudulently obtained passports. Dubai police, who stated that their airport personnel were trained by Europeans to identify faked documents, said that the European passports used were not forgeries. British, Canadian, and Irish governments said the passports bearing their countries' names were, "either fraudulently obtained or [are] outright fakes." All the stolen passports are from countries that do not need visas for the UAE.

- United Kingdom: Six passports with the names Paul John Keely, Stephan Daniel Hodes, Melvyn Adam Mildiner, Jonathan Louis Graham, James Leonard Clarke, and Michael Lawrence Barney, and another six passports with the names Daniel Marc Schnur, Gabriella Barney, Roy Allan Cannon, Stephen Keith Drake, Mark Sklur, and Philip Carr. On 24 May 2010, another British suspect was publicized - Christopher Lockwood. It was later discovered that this suspect had stolen the identity of an Israeli soldier who was killed in the Yom Kippur War.
- Republic of Ireland : Three passports with the names Gail Folliard, Kevin Daveron, and Evan Dennings and another three with the names Ivy Brinton, Anna Shauna Clasby, and Chester Halvey. Ireland's Department of Foreign Affairs declared that the passports used by the suspects were counterfeit and stated that it was "unable to identify any of those three individuals as being genuine Irish". According to the department, Ireland has never issued passports in those names. While the names and signatures were fake, the numbers on the passports were genuine, and belong to Irish citizens. Four of the five citizens have been contacted by the Department of Foreign Affairs, all of whom live in Ireland; none of them have travelled to the Middle East, lost their passports or had them stolen.
- France: One passport with the name Peter Elvinger (suspected of being used by the hit squad leader, and logistical coordinator), plus another three passports with the names David Bernard LaPierre, Mélanie Heard, and Eric Rassineux. According to a spokesman of the French Foreign Affairs ministry, the passport in the name of Elvinger was counterfeit. The French government summoned the Israeli chargé d'affaires in Paris on 18 February and the French Foreign Ministry issued a statement expressing, "deep concern about the malicious and fraudulent use of these French administrative documents."
- Germany: One passport with the name Michael Bodenheimer. German officials initially said that the passport number which they received from the authorities in Dubai is either incomplete or does not exist. Later, it was revealed that the passport was genuine. According to German federal investigators, an Israeli man named Michael Bodenheimer acquired German citizenship in June 2008 after providing immigration officials in Cologne with the pre-World War II address of his grandparents and his parents' marriage certificate. He stated that he was an Israeli citizen and gave his address as a temporary "virtual office" that he had bought in Herzliya (as of 22 February the office does not exist anymore). A Michael Bodenheimer who lives in Israel and holds dual American and Israeli citizenships said he does not know how his identity was stolen. One person who has the passport name Uri Brodsky was arrested in Poland in early June 2010. He was in Cologne with Michael Bodenheimer and Germany is seeking his extradition. See sub-heading "Alexander Verin/Uri Brodsky" below for more information.
- Australia: Three passports with the names Nicole Sandra Mccabe (who at the time was heavily pregnant according to her mother), Adam Korman and Joshua Aaron Krycer. Adam Marcus Korman, an Israeli-Australian citizen living in Israel, said that he was shocked and angry that his identity was stolen. In addition, the other three names are names of residents of Israel. A man named Joshua Krycer works in a hospital located in Jerusalem.

The names used on the British passports belong to suspects who live in Israel and hold dual citizenships. An analysis of the assassination in The Jewish Chronicle noted that this, "is the first real piece of information that could link Israel to the operation." According to Palestine Chronicle Post, Mossad is known to use the identities of Israelis with dual citizenship. In 1997, two Mossad agents traveled with Canadian passports of dual citizenship Israelis to Amman in a botched attempt on the life of Hamas leader Khaled Mashal. According to former katsa Victor Ostrovsky, a Canadian citizen, the Mossad formerly asked permission to use the passports of Israelis with dual nationality, but "I believe at some point, they stopped asking."

A Jerusalem-based British citizen whose name was used on one of the passports told Reuters news agency that he has never been to Dubai and had no connection with the Mossad or the killing. He said that he did not "know how this happened or who chose my name or why". In addition, three other Israelis whose names appeared on the passports reported to the Israeli Channel 2 news that they did not understand the coincidence, and were not related at all to the suspects. In the wake of the revelation that passports of British citizens had figured prominently in the operation, the United Kingdom's Serious Organised Crime Agency (SOCA) launched its own investigation into the matter, and plans to interview the first round of British passport holders that had their identities stolen. The British Foreign Office also summoned the Israeli ambassador on 18 February to share information on the matter. The British government denied claims that Mossad had tipped off the UK that their passports would be used for an operation.

The photographs of 11 of the suspected killers were added to Interpol's most wanted list on 18 February, with a note specifying that they had been published since the identities adopted by the suspects were faked. Dubai airport officials carried out routine retinal scans on 11 of the suspects sought in the assassination when they entered the country and Dubai police said they would publish the scans through Interpol. YNetNews said some hit squad members fled to Iran after the assassination.

Seventeen of the suspects used MasterCards branded by MetaBank of Storm Lake, Iowa but issued by Payoneer Inc which were used to buy their plane tickets in other countries before their arrival in Dubai. Other credit cards show ties to Britain's Nationwide Building Society, IDT Finance of Gilbraltar, and Germany's DZ Bank AG. Payoneer is an Israeli start-up now based in New York with R&D offices and a majority of its employees in Tel Aviv. CEO Yuval Tal, is a former member of the IDF Special Forces. Payoneer is held by three venture capital firms: Greylock Partners, Carmel Ventures, and Crossbar Capital. Greylock, which has offices in the U.S. and Herzliya, Israel, was established by Moshe Mor, a former military intelligence captain in the Israeli army. Carmel Ventures is an Israeli venture capital fund based in Herzliya. Crossbar Partners is run by Charlie Federman, who is also managing director of the BRM Group, a venture capital fund also in Herzliya that was co-founded by Nir Barkat, a former mayor of Jerusalem.

The New York Post originally reported that Tal has disappeared since his company was identified as the issuer of some of the killers' credit cards, with his Brooklyn neighbors telling the NYPD that he left the country. He reappeared a day later, however. The Dubai Police has found the DNA of one person and some fingerprints of other persons which are suspected. The chief of Dubai Police Lieutenant General Dhahi Khalfan Tamim said that there are 648 hours of video films in which the 27 suspected persons are appearing and announced that the police has found the DNA of four suspected agents.

=== Arrests ===
Two Palestinians, Ahmad Hasnin, an intelligence operative of the Fatah-controlled Palestinian Authority (PA), and Anwar Shekhaiber, an employee of the PA in Ramallah, were arrested in Jordan and handed over to Dubai as suspected accomplices to the assassination, suspected of giving logistical assistance such as providing car rentals and hotel bookings. Hamas claimed that their arrest was evidence linking the Palestinian Authority to the killing, while the Palestinian Authority retorted by accusing the arrested Palestinians of being members of Hamas.

The two men are reported to be related to one another and to have lived in Gaza until Hamas took over full control of the Strip in 2006. One went straight to Dubai, while the other joined him after first going to Ramallah, where he was sentenced to death by a Palestinian Authority court, a punishment generally handed down to Israeli collaborators. The recruitment of Ahmad Hasnin by the Mossad could have been done when he was imprisoned by Israel for a month in June 2007 for his involvement with Al Aqsa Martyrs' Brigades, the military wing for Fatah. He came to the UAE in 2008, according to a family source.

Dubai authorities said that one of the two Palestinians held in custody met a suspect in a suspicious place, time and manner, while the second is closely related to him and was found to have already been sentenced to death by one of the Palestinian parties. The second suspect is wanted by Hamas. They are both being held to ensure that no one comes to execute them. A Haaretz report based on information from an unnamed Arab diplomatic source said that Dubai police had asked Syria to detain Mohammed Nasser and other Hamas men for questioning. According to media reports, Nasser was in Dubai in the days before al-Mabhouh's killing and was intimately familiar with his schedule and whereabouts. Dubai Police chief Dahi Khalfan said on 3 March 2010 he requested for the Dubai prosecutor to issue arrest warrants for Israeli Prime Minister Benjamin Netanyahu and the head of Mossad, Meir Dagan for the murder.

==== Alexander Verin/Uri Brodsky ====
On 4 June 2010, Polish police arrested a man at Warsaw airport carrying a false passport with the name Uri Brodsky, who was wanted by German authorities. A European Arrest Warrant from Germany specified that Brodsky, also known as Alexander Verin (or Varin), was "suspected of being involved in illegally obtaining a [German] passport" for another man known as Michael Bodenheimer, who is alleged to have taken part in Mahmoud al-Mabhouh's murder. A Polish court approved Brodsky's extradition to Germany on 7 July, pending appeal. However, the extradition was approved on the basis that Brodsky would not face German charges of espionage – instead he would only face the lesser charge of falsely-obtaining documents. Brodsky was transferred to German custody on 12 August, released on €100,000 bail on 13 August, and flown back to Israel on 14 August. The German prosecutor indicated that Brodsky would not have to face trial after all, but instead that "the matter can now be dealt with by written proceedings," most likely resulting in a fine. At the end of 2010, Germany suspended the case of falsifying documents in lieu of a €60,000 fine; however, a German arrest warrant on the espionage charges remains in effect.

== Arrest of a top suspect ==
On 11 October 2010, The National of Abu Dhabi published an interview with Dubai's police chief Lt. Gen. Dahi Khalfan Tamim, in which he claims that a western country had arrested a top suspect of killing al-Mabhouh about two months earlier. The ambassador of the western country does not want to name the country and the name of the arrested suspect. Tamim expressed frustration at the lack of detail: "Why is it that every time an Israeli is involved in a crime, everyone goes mute? We want anyone who is dealing with this case to deal with it as a security case, and not to pay attention to any other consideration."

== Reactions ==
=== Countries ===
- United Arab Emirates – Sheik Abdullah bin Zayed Al Nahyan, Foreign Minister of the United Arab Emirates (UAE) said, "The abuse of passports poses a global threat, affecting both countries' national security as well as the personal security of travelers." He also said that those responsible would be brought to account, noting that, "The UAE firmly believes that relations among nations should be conducted on the basis of respect for sovereignty, mutual trust and within the framework of international norms. Like all civilised nations, we abide by these principles and we will deal with this criminal act within the international framework expected of civilised nations." Anwar Gargash, Minister of State for Foreign Affairs, expressed the country's deep concern that expertly doctored passports from nations that do not require advance visas were used by the suspected killers. UAE officials said they remained in "close contact with the concerned European governments," listing the United Kingdom, Ireland, France, Germany and Austria.

Lieutenant General Dahi Khalfan Tamim said on 1 March 2010, during the International Security National Resilience Exhibition & Conference at Abu Dhabi National Exhibition Centre, that the police of the UAE will develop the skills to identify persons who are Israelis. So the police will deny the entry of any person as a suspected Israeli.

- United Kingdom – Britain's Foreign Office believes that the passports used were fraudulent; one report indicated that they had issued the passports in January 2010, the only difference between the actual identities being the photographs. The Telegraph reported on 20 February that diplomatic sources say that the passport fraud was carried out by Israeli immigration officials. It is claimed that the dual Israeli-British citizens had their passports taken from them as they passed through the airport in Tel Aviv – the details on the documents were recorded (and they were most likely photocopied), and then used to create new documents. These new documents sported the pictures of the suspects, but used the names and numbers of those whose identities were stolen. As a result of an investigation by the British Serious Organised Crime Agency, the government concluded that there were "compelling evidence to believe that Israel was responsible for the misuse of the British passports." The British Foreign Secretary David Miliband expelled a senior Israeli diplomat, who was thought to be the Mossad's station commander in the country. Britain also issued a warning to British passport holders traveling to Israel to "only hand your passport over to third parties including Israeli officials when absolutely necessary". Israel had already used fake British passports to conduct an operation in 1987.
- France – François Fillon, the French Prime Minister, said that though it remained unclear as to who was responsible, "France condemns assassination. Assassination is not a means of action in international relations." The Israeli chargé d'affaires in Paris was summoned on 18 February and the French Foreign Ministry issued a statement expressing, "deep concern about the malicious and fraudulent use of these French administrative documents." The French counterintelligence agency DCRI is believed to have protested to Mossad after finding it had used a Paris hotel as a base to stage the assassination. According to a Le Monde report, France was concerned that Hamas would suspect French involvement in the assassination due to the operation having been run out of Paris and the use of forged French passports, and suspended intelligence sharing with Israel.
- Austria – The spokesman for the Austrian Interior Ministry confirmed that Austria is investigating the use of Austrian mobile phones by the suspected killers.
- Canada – The Royal Canadian Mounted Police denied an accusation from the Police Chief of the Emirate of Dubai that made an arrest in the case. A spokeswoman for the Canadian Security Intelligence Service said that because the probe was a foreign investigation it would be "inappropriate" to comment.
- Germany – Germany confirmed that it is actively pursuing information on the identity of the killers of al-Mabhouh. The German federal prosecutor's office in Karlsruhe began investigations about foreign spy activities in connection with the German passport used by one suspect in Dubai. The German Federal Intelligence Service told members of the German parliament that apparently the Mossad executed the operation in Dubai. According to Der Spiegel, the Mossad operation could be considered as an affront to the Germans since the current head of German intelligence, Ernst Uhrlau has been acting at the behest of the Israeli government as a liaison between Jerusalem and Hamas. He sought the release of Israeli soldier Gilad Shalit, who was abducted by Palestinian militants in 2006 in exchange for Palestinian prisoners held by the Israelis. Urhrlau was in Israel just a few days before 19 January. By then the Dubai operation was certainly under way.
- (Republic of Ireland) Ireland – Investigations by Ireland's Department of Foreign Affairs Passport Service and by the Garda Síochána concluded that eight Irish passports were used in the assassination, and all were forgeries (but based on information from valid passports). Irish citizens whose information had been used were issued with new passports. Dubai Police had Interpol issue red notices (arrest warrants) for Jael Foliard, Kevien Daverone, Ivy Broton, Evan Denengz and Anna Shauna Clasby, all of whom entered Dubai on forged Irish passports. Ireland's Minister for Foreign Affairs Micheál Martin in a statement issued on 15 June 2010 said the Irish government had come to the "inescapable conclusion" that Israel was responsible for the forged passports used in the al-Mabhouh assassination, noting Israel did not assist in his country's investigations and did not deny involvement.
- Iran – On 2 February, the Iranian foreign ministry blamed Israel for the incident, stating, "This is another indication of the existence of state terrorism by the Zionist regime".
- Australia – On 25 February, Prime Minister Kevin Rudd, said that any country that so abused Australian passports held Australia in contempt, stating, "we will not let the matter lie." In a meeting with Israeli Ambassador Yuval Rotem, Foreign Affairs Minister, Stephen Smith, made it "crystal clear" that if it was concluded that Israeli officials had condoned or sponsored the abuse of the Australian passports, "Australia would not regard that as the act of a friend". Soon after this occurred, Australia abstained on a UN motion to investigate alleged Israeli war crimes committed during the Gaza War, a motion that Australia had previously opposed. In the Australian press there was widespread speculation that the move was retaliation for the passport affair, although this was denied by the Australian government. In response to the incident, Australia expelled a Mossad agent who had been working in the Israeli embassy in Canberra on 24 May 2010. Foreign Minister Stephen Smith was quoted as saying that Australian passports had been misused by Israel on previous occasions, and the decision to expel the Mossad agent "was made much more in sorrow than in anger".
- Lebanon – Key Hezbollah members became nervous after the killing in Dubai. Since foreign passports were seemingly used for the attack, Hezbollah asked the Lebanese government for additional screening of foreigners entering Lebanon.
- Sweden – Foreign Minister Carl Bildt stated that "misuse of European passports is not to be tolerated".
- Luxembourg – Foreign Minister Jean Asselborn stated that "political assassinations have no place in the 21st century".
- Spain – Spanish Foreign Minister Miguel Ángel Moratinos stated that his country was "extremely concerned".
- Israel – The Israeli government initially did not comment on claims that it was involved in al-Mabhouh's death. On 17 February, Foreign Minister Avigdor Lieberman refused to confirm or deny any Israeli involvement, and noted a lack of solid evidence for Israeli involvement. On 24 February, The Jerusalem Post quoted the Israeli Opposition leader Tzipi Livni as saying, "Every terrorist must know that no one will support him when a soldier, and it doesn't matter what soldier, tries to kill him." Israeli media and public opinion has generally accepted Mossad's responsibility for the operation. Due to Israel's military censorship laws the Israeli media at first were careful to use the phrase "according to foreign media reports" to avoid directly accusing Mossad, however the phrase was abandoned and Mossad's culpability was openly assumed after the first week of the scandal. Opinions of the Israeli media were divided between approving of the success of al-Mabhouh's killing and disapproving the sloppiness of the operation and the resultant exposure and media scandal. Haaretz's Amir Oren called Dagan to be fired due to what he considered a sloppy job, while the newspaper's Yossi Melman predicted Israel would emerge from the incident "unblemished". After the United Kingdom expelled an Israeli diplomat over the use of British passports, Israeli right wing politicians commented against Britain's "disloyal" action. Knesset member Michael Ben-Ari stated that "This is anti-Semitism disguised as anti-Zionism". Israeli politician Aryeh Eldad stated that "Britain's behavior is hypocritical. Who are they to judge us in the war on terror?" Other than non-official comments made by right wing politicians, Israel has not officially responded.
- United States – On 28 December 2010, leaked diplomatic cables showed that Dubai considered keeping the assassination secret, and asked the United States to help track down information on credit card numbers suspected of having been used by the assassins. The United States did not cooperate with the investigation.

=== Palestinian ===
The day following al-Mabhouh's death, Hamas' armed wing, the Al-Qassam Brigades, announced that he died of terminal cancer in a hospital in the United Arab Emirates. On 29 January, Hamas' deputy politburo chief Mousa Abu Marzook said, "Mossad agents are those who assassinated al-Mabhouh". Top Hamas official Mahmoud al-Zahar speculated that same day that it was possible that members of the entourage of Israeli infrastructure minister Uzi Landau, who were in the United Arab Emirates at the time for a renewable energy conference, were involved in his killing. Landau dismissed the claim, stating that his delegation was in Abu Dhabi, some 120 km from Dubai, and was escorted by an eight-man UAE security team at all times.

On 2 February, Hamas' representative in Lebanon Osama Hamdan said that Palestinian Authority security forces might have been involved in the death, stating that, "The Palestinian Authority security forces are pursuing [our] fighters and they have killed dozens of them since 1994." Haaretz reported that details from a preliminary Hamas investigation procured by the newspaper suggested that al-Mabhouh was assassinated by agents of an Arab government, and that al-Mabhouh was wanted by Egypt and Jordan. On 12 February, senior Hamas leader Khaled Mashaal rejected reports that Hamas blamed Arab states for al-Mabhouh's death, and said the Israeli Mossad was solely responsible.

On 19 February, Hamas representatives said that the two Palestinians arrested in Dubai, Ahmad Hassanain and Anwar Shheibar, are former members of Fatah's security forces and work at a construction company in Dubai owned by Mohammed Dahlan, a senior Fatah security official. A senior Hamas official told Al-Hayat newspaper that the two provided logistical aid to the Mossad hit team alleged to have carried out the murder, renting them cars and hotel rooms. The two were linked to a Gaza death cell under Dahlan's command, which worked to suppress dissidence among Palestinians. Dahlan and Fatah denied the charges.

=== European Union ===
EU foreign ministers "strongly condemned" the use of forged European passports in the killing.

=== United Nations ===
Philip Alston, the UN special rapporteur on extrajudicial killings was quoted by the Los Angeles Times as stating, "If a foreign intelligence agency was responsible for the killing of al-Mabhouh, the matter should clearly be classified as an extrajudicial execution. There is no legal justification for the cold-blooded murder of a man who, if alleged to have committed crimes, could have been arrested and charged."

== In popular culture ==
A 2010 Hebrew language novel titled Dubai and written by Yomi 'Eyni is set around the assassination. In 2011, filmmaker Chris Marker released a short film called Stopover in Dubai, consisting of a news report of CCTV footage of the suspects and victim directly before, during and after the assassination. It was Marker's final film. A 2013 spy action comedy film titled Kidon also revolves around the assassination. The 2015 Israeli TV series False Flag is also loosely based on the story of the assassination.

== See also ==
- 2004 Israel–New Zealand passport scandal, arising from an attempt by Mossad operatives to get false passports from New Zealand in the name of a disabled man
- Israel–United Arab Emirates relations
- Lillehammer affair, the killing of a Moroccan waiter in Norway mistaken by Mossad for one of the Black September operatives who killed Israeli athletes at the 1972 Munich Olympics
- Assassination of Ismail Haniyeh, happened nearly 15 years later in Iran
- List of unsolved murders (2000–present)
