= Abdullah Khalifa al-Marri =

Commander-in-chief of the Dubai Police Force

Lieutenant General Abdullah Khalifa al-Marri
- عبد الله خليفة المري

Dubai Police Force
- Incumbent
- Assumed office 1 March 2017
- Preceded by: Khamis Mattar Al Mezaina

Personal details
- Born: August 1965 (age 61)
- Education: United Arab Emirates University

Abdullah Khalifa al-Marri (Arabic: عبد الله خليفة المري; born 14 August 1965) is a lieutenant general who is the current chief of Dubai Police, having served since 1 March 2017.

Al-Marri is also a member of the Executive Council of the Government of Dubai.

== Early life and education ==
Al-Marri was born in 1965. He obtained a bachelor's degree in sociology from United Arab Emirates University in 1991. He then joined the Dubai Police Force in 1992, where he went on to obtain a diploma in Police Science in the same year from the Dubai Police Academy.

== Career ==
=== Dubai Police ===
Al-Marri joined Dubai police in 1992. In 2004, he became the Director of the police's VIP security department. In 2014, he became deputy director of Protective Security and Emergency Department in Dubai Police.

On 1 March 2017, al-Marri, who was then a Major General, became the 7th Commander-in-Chief of the Dubai Police Force.

In March 2020, al-Marri was promoted to the rank of Lieutenant General.

== See also ==
- Government of Dubai
- Law enforcement in the United Arab Emirates
