= Dubai Municipality Museum =

Site located in the Emirate of Dubai

Coordinates: 25°16′04″N 55°17′52″E

Dubai Municipality Museum is a heritage site located in the Emirate of Dubai (United Arab Emirates). Established in 1957, it housed the headquarters of Dubai Municipality until 1964, when the municipality moved to a new building on Al Maktoum Street. This building is a landmark of great historical value and is located in the heart of the old Deira souk next to the creek. It documents Dubai Municipality's areas of expertise and the state of its administrative development, narrating the history of Dubai Municipality's paintings and summarizing the municipality's public projects, services and achievements. It also documents local requests and administrative decisions. Entry is free.
