= Law enforcement in the United Arab Emirates =

Law enforcement is the responsibility of each emirate of the United Arab Emirates; each emirate's police force is responsible for matters within its own borders, but they routinely share information on various areas. The forces also each have units to deal with protests, riot control, or heavily armed suspects. The ministry integrates the police and security systems in the U.A.E. The respective Emirati law enforcement authorities in each emirate are responsible for maintaining general law and order. Crimes against national security will be referred to the Federal Courts. There is also close cooperation between the law enforcement forces and the military. The police in the U.A.E comes under the Ministry of Interior and are also responsible for maintaining the prisons, and the arm responsible for this is the Corrections Department. Under this Ministry is also the Immigration Department. The police forces of the Emirate of Abu Dhabi and the Emirate of Dubai are the biggest in the country, as these two emirates are the ones with the most expats, locals, and visitors.

== Police Special Unit ==
The Police Special Unit is a counter-terrorism unit, modeled on the British SAS. Recruits come from countries such as Pakistan, India, Sri Lanka, Bangladesh, Nigeria, Kenya, Ghana, Senegal, Yemen, Oman, Lebanon, Palestinian Territory, Indonesia, South Korea, Japan, Malaysia, Philippines, Germany, Netherlands, Greece, Italy and other countries for training in Abu Dhabi and Dubai, and then they are assigned to any of the emirates that do not already have such a team in place. The unit contains 40 men and 38 women and is based at the Abu Dhabi International Airport and Dubai International Airport.

== Emirati law enforcement agencies ==
- Abu Dhabi Police
- Dubai Police Force
- Sharjah Police Force
- Ajman Police Force
- Umm Al Quwain Police Force
- Ras Al Khaimah Police Force
- Fujairah Police Force
