= Sharjah Police Force =

Primary law enforcement agency in the Emirate of Sharjah

- Official emblem of Sharjah Police
- Common name: Sharjah Police

Agency overview
- Formed: 1967

Jurisdictional structure
- Operations jurisdiction: Emirate of Sharjah, United Arab Emirates
- Map of Sharjah Police's jurisdiction
- Area: 2,590 km^{2} (1,000 sq mi)
- Population: 1,830,000
- General nature: Local civilian police

Operational structure
- Headquarters: Sharjah, United Arab Emirates

Website
- shjpolice.gov.ae

The Sharjah Police Force (Arabic: شرطة الشارقة) was established in the year 1967 by the then ruler of Sharjah, Khalid bin Mohammed Al Qasimi, to provide security to the Emirate of Sharjah.

== History ==
Against the backdrop of the increasing civil unrest in Aden Colony, and a decision by the British Ministry of Defence to vacate the British base from Aden in 1966 and its relocation to Sharjah, the British asked Sheikh Khalid bin Mohammed Al Qasimi to establish an organized force to help maintain security in Sharjah. Sheikh Khalid appointed a British officer to lead the force, a Jordanian officer as a deputy, and 50 men of his personal guard in November 1966. Sharjah Police Force was then officially established in September 1967 by a decree from Sheikh Khalid.

== Departments ==
Sharjah Police manages public security across the city and emirate of Sharjah, including the East Coast cities of Dibba Al Hisn, Khor Fakkan and Kalba. It consists of three organisational units, the General Directorate of Resources and Support Services; the General Directorate of Central Operations and the General Directorate of Police Operations. These report to the Commander-in-Chief and Deputy Commander-in-Chief. Sharjah's Amiri Guard reports directly to the Commander in Chief, while the Media and PR Department, Correctional & Punishment organisation department and the Police Research Centre report to the deputy commander-in-chief.

=== General Directorate of Resources and Support Services ===
The core administrative resource for Sharjah Police, this division includes human resources, financial affairs, electronic services and communications, support services and the Police Training Institute.

=== General Directorate of Central Operations ===
This directorate manages the traffic and patrols department, vehicle and driver licensing department, operations and the special tasks department, based in Al Mirgab.

=== General Directorate of Police Operations ===
The General Directorate manages the Eastern and Central Region police departments as well as the Criminal Investigations Department (CID), the Drugs Enforcement Department, the Community Police Department, Airports and Border Patrol Police and the Police Stations Department.

== Operations ==
Sharjah Police operates a network of stations in the city of Sharjah and the central and eastern regions of the emirate, including Al Heera; Al Gharb; Wasit; Industrial Area; Hamriya; Saja; Dhaid; Madam; Mileiha and Thameed, as well as stations on the East Coast at Wadi Al Helou; Nahwa; Dibba, Khor Fakkan and Kalba.

=== Narcotics ===
Although the crime rate in Sharjah and the UAE in general is extremely low, Sharjah Police have conducted a wide range of operations against narcotics smugglers, including the seizure of 19 kg of heroin leading to the arrest of six smugglers in July 2018. A further haul the same month yielded 20 kilograms of hashish, 1,300 Tramadol pills and 50 grams of crystal meth and led to the arrest of three smugglers.

=== Financial Crimes Unit ===
Established at Buhaira Police Station in 2015, the Financial Crimes Unit manages arbitration in financial disputes and cases, returning as much as Dhs 37 million per quarter to complainants. In Sharjah, issuing a cheque without sufficient funds to cover can lead to a criminal case being filed. The Unit aims to avoid cases being filed related to financial disputes wherever possible.

== Online Crime ==
Part of the remit of the CID is online crime in Sharjah. In 2015/16 alone, 214 cases were registered and 239 suspects were taken into custody for online crimes, ranging from bank account fraud to blackmail. Cybercrime or fraud is punishable in the UAE under federal law No 5 of 2012 with 'a prison term of not less than one year and/or a fine of not less than Dhs250,000 and not more than Dhs1 million'. In 2016, Sharjah Police held a forum on cybercrime and in 2018 the force embarked on a major awareness campaign to warn young people of the dangers of online extortion through social media.

A scheme to link bank ATMs directly to Sharjah Police was announced in 2018 in a bid to reduce a number of ATM robberies taking place, particularly in the city's industrial areas, where a large number of workers congregate.

In February 2018, Sharjah Police arrested a Pakistani national accused of carrying out a Dhs2.5 million bitcoin fraud.

== Services ==
A number of online services are managed by Sharjah Police, including traffic licensing and fines payment as well as a range of security and community services. The force also operates an online complaints service, 'Open Doors'. The police call centre manages high volumes of calls, up to 45,000 during Ramadan, mostly complaints against beggars or relating to traffic violations. A number of services are available using the Sharjah Police Smart App.

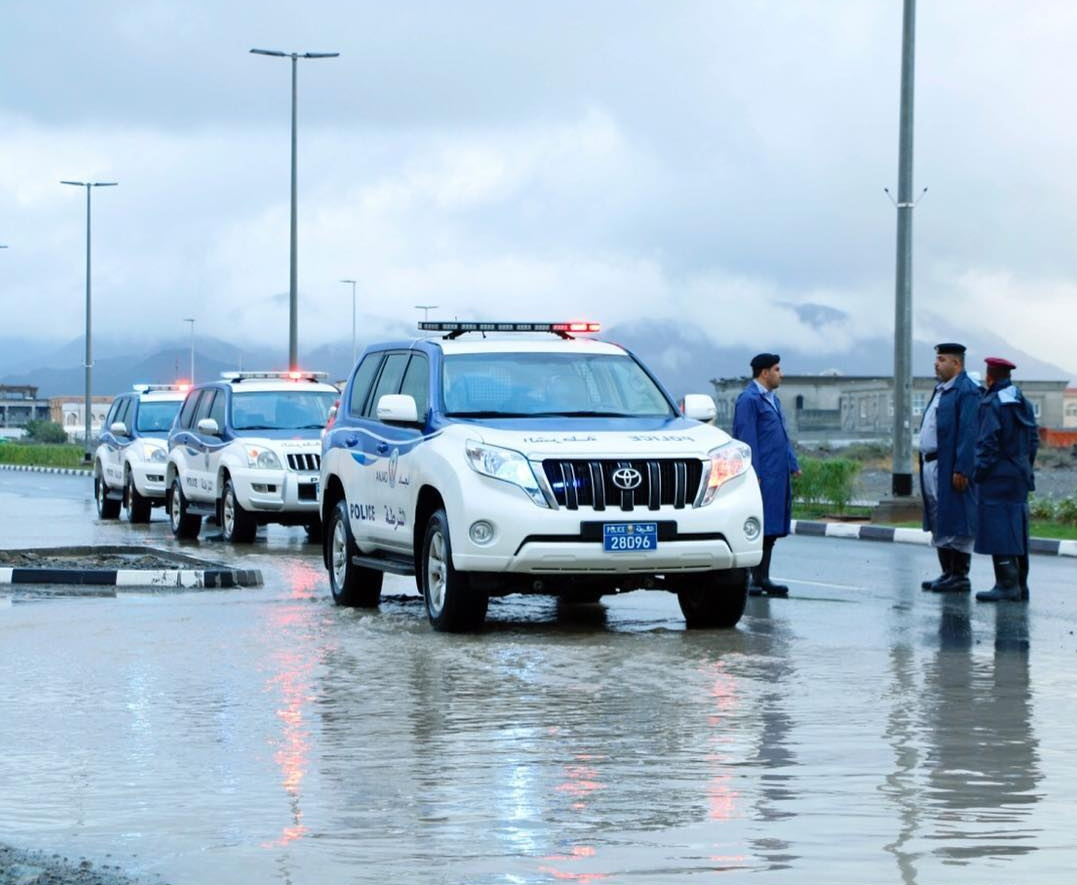
Sharjah Police units monitoring the condition of roads during a period of rain.

=== Rafid ===
The 50 vehicles of the Rafid traffic accident patrol (there are 120 Rafid officers) were launched in May 2018 and replaced the previous Saeed service, attending minor traffic incidents and producing police reports. Supported by a mobile Rafid application, the Rafid patrol charges a fee of Dhs440 for attending an accident and writing a police report. Without this report, vehicle repairs cannot be carried out in Sharjah. Minor accidents can also be reported through the Rafid smart app, if app users complete the report without requiring a Rafid officer to attend, the fee is reduced to Dhs385. A 14-man contact center supports the Rafid service, which aims to respond to Sharjah's some 300 daily minor accidents within 15 minutes. Rafid officers are not policemen.

=== Police Sciences Academy ===
The Sharjah Police Sciences Academy is located at Sharjah University City. Governed by the Police Sciences Academy Council, in 2018 it launched a research award aiming to encourage innovation and research in curbing crime and increasing public security.

=== Police Magazine ===
Established in 1988, the Sharjah Police magazine, Al Shurti, is a monthly bulletin. A quarterly title, Al Fikr Al Shurti, is also published. A radio show dedicated to issues of public security, Aman Ya Beladi, runs on Sharjah Radio and a TV programme also runs on Sharjah Television.

== Uniform and livery ==
The Sharjah Police uniform (from September 2024) is either sandy brown with a black cap or blue/grey with a yellow suit and a red cap, and the police cars are either sandy brown and white (Anjad) or white with sandy brown writing.
