= Government of Dubai =

Government of the Emirate of Dubai

Government of Dubai حكومة دبي
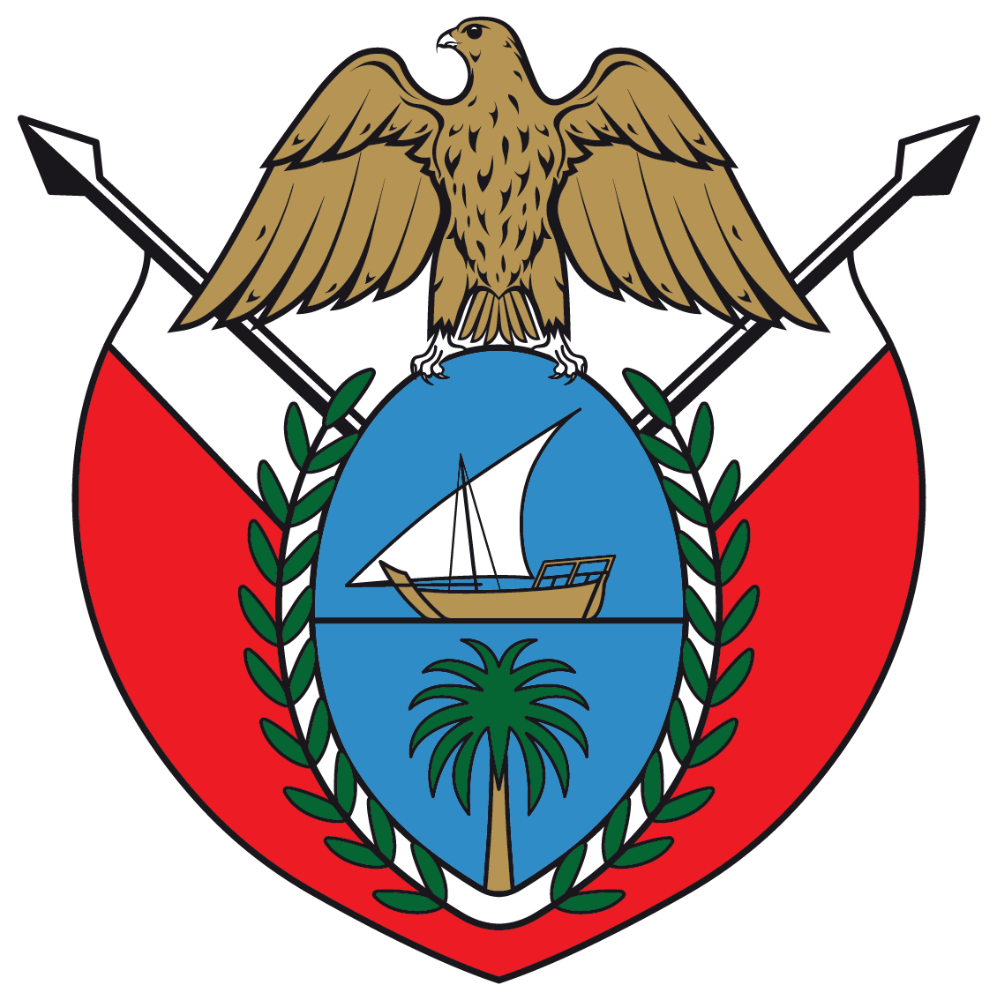
- Emirate: Emirate of Dubai
- Country: United Arab Emirates
- Website: dubai.ae

Head of Government
- Ruler of Dubai: Mohammed bin Rashid Al Maktoum

Executive Authority
- Chairman: Hamdan bin Mohammed Al Maktoum
- Main body: Dubai Executive Council
- Appointed by: Ruler of Dubai
- Headquarters: Emirates Towers

Judicial Authority
- Court: Dubai Court of Cassation

The Government of Dubai (Arabic: حكومة دبي) is the subnational authority that governs the Emirate of Dubai, one of the seven constituent emirates which make up the United Arab Emirates. The executive authority and head of the government is the Ruler of Dubai, Sheikh Mohammed bin Rashid Al Maktoum. The Ruler of Dubai appoints the Dubai Executive Council, which is led by the crown prince of Dubai and is responsible for the day-to-day management of Dubai Government agencies such as the Dubai Municipality and numerous other governing entities.

== History ==
Since 1830, the Emirate of Dubai had a semi-autonomous government led by the Ruler of Dubai, who would delegate responsibilities of managing the affairs of the emirate to representatives in an informal government. Prior to the unification of the United Arab Emirates, Dubai had already started issuing local laws as part of the Trucial States on matters of taxation and trade, allowing the emirate to attract foreign trade and develop its fishing and Pearling industry.

Following the unification of the United Arab Emirates and the establishment of the federal government of the UAE in 1971, the Emirate of Dubai maintained autonomy for various domestic affairs including education, transportation, economic affairs, and security with its own police force unlike other northern emirates that relied on federal ministries.

On February 24, 2003, Law 3 of 2003 (Law, Law) (in Arabic). 24 February 2003. was issued by the ruler of Dubai establishing the Dubai Executive Council as a legislative council to support the ruler of Dubai in his duties and exercising some of his responsibilities, with the head of the council and the deputies to be appointed by the ruler and the remaining seats to be distributed to other members, usually heads of major Dubai government departments such as the heads of Dubai Municipality and the Dubai Police Force.

== Organization ==
The Ruler of Dubai is the absolute monarch and head of government] of the Emirate of Dubai and has the sole authority to issue decrees establishing governmental departments, issuing and amending laws. The ruler of Dubai has since 2003 designated some responsibility of overseeing the Dubai governmental departments to the Dubai Executive Council which is tasked with supervising governmental departments, preparing the yearly budget, issuing certain executive decrees, and reporting to the ruler of Dubai on a regular basis.

Dubai government departments or agencies are formed by royal decree, such as the decree to form the Dubai Police Force in 1956, and then generally added to the responsibilities of the Dubai Executive Council. In 2022 the Dubai government has 58 governmental departments under the supervision of the Dubai Executive Council.

The Dubai Official Gazette (Arabic: الجريدة الرسمية transl. Al-Ǧarīdaẗ al-rasmiyyaẗ) is the official publication of the Government of Dubai and publishes laws, ordinances and other regulations.

== Dubai Executive Council ==
The Dubai Executive Council is the legislative arm of the Dubai government

Following its formation in 2003, the Dubai Executive Council has become the legislative arm of the Dubai government, enforcing royal decrees issued by the ruler of Dubai into governmental regulations and policies and facilitating intra-governmental communication. Law 3 of 2003 (Law, Law) (in Arabic). 24 February 2003. stipulates the council to be organised into a chairman of the council who is appointed by royal decree and members of the council, appointed on the advice of the chairman of the council by the ruler of Dubai. Law 3 of 2003 allows any individual to become a member of the council, irrespective of whether they lead a governmental department or entity but requires the heads of 14 departments to be members, such as Dubai Municipality and Dubai Police Force.

As of July 2022, the Dubai Executive Council has 22 members including the chairman of the council, which has been led by the Crown Prince of Dubai, Sheikh Hamdan bin Mohammed Al Maktoum, since September 2006.

The members of the Executive Council include:

Number	Name	Position	Notable duties
1	Sheikh Hamdan bin Mohammed Al Maktoum	Chairman	Crown Prince of Dubai
2	Sheikh Maktoum bin Mohammed Al Maktoum	First Deputy Chairman	Deputy Ruler of Dubai, Deputy Prime Minister of the United Arab Emirates, and Minister of Finance of the UAE
3	Sheikh Ahmed bin Saeed Al Maktoum	Second Deputy Chairman	Head of the Dubai Civil Aviation Authority, Chairman and Chief Executive of the Emirates airline and others
4	Sheikh Hasher bin Maktoum Al Maktoum	Council Member	Director General of Dubai Media Department
5	Lieutenant General Dhahi Khalfan Tamim	Council Member	Deputy Chief of Police and Public Security
6	Mohammed Ibrahim Al Shaibani	Council Member	Director General of Dubai Ruler's Court, Chairman of Dubai Islamic Bank, and executive director of Investment Corporation of Dubai.
7	Abdulrahman Saleh Al Saleh	Council Member	Director General of the Dubai Department of Finance
8	Abdulla Al Basti	Secretary General	Secretary General of The Executive Council of Dubai
9	Lieutenant General Abdullah Khalifa Al Marri	Council Member	Commander-in-chief of the Dubai Police Force
10	Mattar Mohammed Al Tayer	Council Member	Chairman of the Roads and Transport Authority (Dubai).
11	Saeed Mohammed Al Tayer	Council Member	Director and CEO of Dubai Electricity and Water Authority.
12	Awadh Seghayer AlKetbi	Council Member	Director General of the Dubai Health Authority.
13	Issam Issa Al Humaidan	Council Member	Attorney General of the Dubai Public Prosecution.
14	Sultan Ahmed Bin Sulayem	Council Member	Chairman of the Ports, Customs and Free Zone Corporation and CEO of DP World.
15	Eng. Marwan Ahmed Bin Ghalita	Council Member	Director-General of Dubai Municipality.
16	Helal Saeed Almarri	Council Member	Director-General of the Dubai Department of Tourism and Commerce Marketing and CEO of the Dubai World Trade Centre.
17	Dr. Hamad Bin Al Sheikh Ahmed Al Shaibani	Council Member	Director General of the Islamic Affairs and Charitable Activities Department.
18	Sultan Butti Bin Mejren	Council Member	Director General of the Dubai Land Department.
19	Lieutenant General Mohammed Ahmed Al Marri	Council Member	Director General of the Dubai General Directorate of Residency and Foreigners Affairs
20	Tarish Eid Al Mansouri	Council Member	Director General of Dubai Courts.
21	Abdulrahman Hareb Al Hareb	Council Member	Director General of the Dubai Financial Audit Authority
22	Dr. Lowai Mohamed Belhoul	Council Member	Director General of the Legal Affairs Department of the Dubai Government

== First Lady of Dubai ==
First Lady of Dubai (Arabic: سيدة الأولى في دبي) is the name given to the senior wife and consort to the Ruler of Dubai. The first lady is the chief matriarch, and her appearance and comportment are considered to represent Dubai. As of 2025 the first lady is Sheikha Hind bint Maktoum Al Maktoum, wife of Sheikh Mohammed bin Rashid Al Maktoum.

The position of first lady carries official duties of helping the Sheikh, and inaugurating various charities. Sheikha Hind is the chairperson of the UAE charitable foodbank. The first lady attends many official ceremonies and functions of state together with or in place of the Emir of Dubai. She also organises events and civic programs, and is typically involved with different social causes.

== See also ==
- Al Maktoum, the ruling family of Dubai
- Ruler of Dubai, head of the Emirate of Dubai
- Politics of the United Arab Emirates
