= Dubai Courts =

Dubai government department

- Seal of the Dubai Courts

Agency overview
- Formed: September 8, 1970; 55 years ago
- Jurisdiction: Emirate of Dubai
- Headquarters: Dubai, United Arab Emirates
- Agency executive: Taresh Eid Al Mansouri, Director-General
- Website: www.dc.gov.ae

The Dubai Courts (Arabic: محاكم دبي) are a Government of Dubai department responsible for the management, administration, hearing and issuing of judicial judgements for the Emirate of Dubai. The department is led by a Director-General who sits at the Dubai Executive Council and reports directly to the ruler of Dubai. The department has been led by Director-General Tarish Eid Al Mansouri since 2014.

Dubai Courts is the main department responsible for the judicial branch of the Emirate of Dubai, and operates independently of the Dubai Public Prosecution, and the Dubai Legal Affairs department which represents the Government of Dubai in legal matters. It has jurisdiction across the Emirate, except for specific free economic zones like the Dubai International Financial Centre which may retain special jurisdiction for commercial and labour matters.

== History ==
Judicial enforcement in Dubai was informally led by the sheikh or ruler in 1833, solving simple disputes between individuals, and who would often invite scholars to act as judges, often issuing verdicts in their homes, such as Justice Sheikh Mohammed Bin Abdul Salam Al Margharbi, a scholar from Morocco that acted as a judge for the emirate in the early 1900s. In 1938 then-ruler of Dubai, Saeed bin Maktoum bin Hasher Al Maktoum issued a decree for his brother to resolve judicial and legal disputes, and eventually taking residence in Naif Fort, the first headquarters of the then-named Dubai Department of Justice. By 1958, a judicial body of 3 judges was formed to hear disputes between locals, and disputes that involves foreigners were heard by a British commission as part of the Trucial States.

From 1970 to 1988, several decrees formally established the three courts in the Emirate of Dubai, the Court of First Instance, the Court of Appeals and the Court of Cassation, which acted independently of each other until their unification under the management of the Dubai Courts department in 2000. In 2003, Law 1 of 2003 merged the Dubai Public Prosecution and the Dubai Courts to form the Dubai Department of Justice, but was later repealed by Law 5 of 2005 which separated the Dubai Public Prosecution and Dubai Courts into separate entities.

== Organization ==
Dubai Courts manages three levels of Courts: the First Instance Court, the Court of Appeals, and the Court of Cassation. The department has the authority to appoint and remove judges in any of the courts, often on the advice of the ruler of Dubai, and judges are formally given independence to issue judgements in the name of the ruler.

The courts are further divided into minor and major circuits and separate commercial, labour, personal, civil and criminal courts, each with three levels of hearings. Dubai Courts also has the authority to establish specialised courts, such as the establishment of a specialised Inheritance Court in 2022. Following the issuing of judgements, an Execution Court is often responsible for ordering the enforcement of a judgement once the period of appeal has expired.

== See also ==
- Government of Dubai
- Legal system of the United Arab Emirates
