= Thameed =

Al Thameed
- Location within United Arab Emirates
- Coordinates: 25°0′39.37″N 55°52′59.96″E
- Country: United Arab Emirates
- Emirate: Sharjah

Population (1 July 2017)estimate
  - Total: 1,650

Thameed (Arabic: الثميد) is a town in Emirate of Sharjah, United Arab Emirates (UAE). It is part of Al Madam municipality and is located between Dubai and Hatta, off the Dhaid/Madam highway (E55). It has a police station and a youth center. Thameed also has wheat farms.

As of 1st July 2017, Thameed had an estimated population of 1,650.
