= Dubai Municipality =

Government of Dubai municipal body

Coordinates: 25°15′52″N 55°18′42″E

Dubai Municipality (DM)
- بلدية دبي

Agency overview
- Jurisdiction: Emirate of Dubai
- Headquarters: Al Rigga, Dubai, United Arab Emirates
- Agency executive: Marwan Bin Ghalita (Acting) – (2025-Present), Director-General
- Child agencies: Waste & Sewerage Agency; Public Facilities Agency; Environment, Health & Safety Agency; Buildings Regulation & Permits Agency
- Website: dm.gov.ae

Dubai Municipality (Arabic: بلدية دبي) is the Government of Dubai municipal body with jurisdiction over city services and the upkeep of facilities in the Emirate of Dubai, United Arab Emirates and reports directly to the Dubai Executive Council. The agency is led by a Director-General that sits at the Dubai Executive Council. The department has been led by Director-General Eng. Dawood Abdul Rahman Al Hajiri since 2018.

== History ==
It was established in 1954 by the Crown Prince of Dubai, Rashid bin Saeed Al Maktoum. In 2001, the municipality embarked on an e-government project to provide 40 of its city services online through its web portal.

== Organisation and Governance ==
Dubai Municipality consists of 2 sectors, the Corporate Support Service Sector, and the Planning and Governance Sector, both led by Chief Executive Officers that report to the Director-General. In addition to the sectors, the DM has 4 separate agencies led by Directors, each with their own departments and jurisdictions.

- Waste and Sewerage Agency
- Public Facilities Agency
- Environment, Health & Safety Agency
- Buildings Regulations & Permits Agency

== World Migratory Birds ==
The theme of World Migratory Birds Day 2020 was “Birds Connect Our World”. Dubai Municipality celebrated World Migratory Birds Day.
