= Dhahi Khalfan Tamim =

Emirati police officer

Lieutenant General Dhahi Khalfan Tamim
- ضاحي خلفان تميم

Commander in Chief of Dubai Police Force
- In office 1980 – 23 November 2013
- Appointed by: Mohammed bin Rashid Al Maktoum
- Preceded by: Abdulla Khalfan Belhoul
- Succeeded by: Khamis Al Mezaina

Personal details
- Born: Dhahi Khalfan Tamim; 1 October 1951 (age 75)
- Education: Royal Police College in Amman

Dhahi Khalfan Tamim (Arabic: ضاحي خلفان تميم; born 1 October 1951) is an Emirati police officer, a Lieutenant General of Dubai Police, and the current Deputy Chief of Police and General Security. He was Chief of Dubai Police from 1980 to November 2013.

He came to international attention while overseeing the investigation of the assassination of Mahmoud al-Mabhouh in 2010 in Dubai, where he uncovered passport forgery of multiple Australian and European passports used by Mossad to enter the United Arab Emirates.

== Early life and education ==
Tamim was born in Dubai on 1 October 1951 to Khalfan. He attended the Royal Police College in Amman in Jordan and graduated in 1970. He continued his education afterwards and specialized as a criminal investigator prior to returning to the United Arab Emirates.

== Career ==
=== Dubai Police ===
Tamim joined Dubai Police after graduation and worked as a criminal investigator in Dubai Police. He held the position of director of administrative and financial affairs before being promoted as deputy chief of police in 1979. A year later in 1980, he was promoted to chief of Dubai police.

He served as Dubai Police chief until 23 November 2013, after which he was replaced by Lieutenant General Khamis Al Mezeina.

==== Assassination of Mahmoud Al Mabhouh ====
The assassination of Mahmoud al-Mabhouh occurred in Dubai on 19 January 2010. Tamim, as chief of Dubai Police, spearheaded the investigation. He eventually called a press conference and accused Mossad of assassinating Al Mabhouh. Tamim indicted 27 suspects who used falsified Australian and European passports from France, Germany, United Kingdom.

Dubai police released camera footage showing operatives trailing Mabhouh. The suspects were linked together using falsified passports, transactions on prepaid debit cards using the same type of card, phone call records who called the same number in Austria, and camera surveillance which showed two operatives using the bathroom facility at the same hotel to wear disguises. The passports were proven to be fraudulent and carried the names of multiple uninvolved Israeli dual citizens. This led to the governments to call on Israeli ambassadors for diplomatic repercussion for the misuse of their passports. Governments of Australia, Ireland, and United Kingdom also expelled Israeli diplomats. One of the operatives who carried a German passport was later apprehended in Poland after using the fraudulent passport and repatriated to Germany in August 2010 where a cash bail of 100,000 euros was paid for his release and he was immediately flown to Tel Aviv.

Tamim is regarded as the police chief who exposed Mossad tactics for the operation. He would later state that he received two death threats linked to his role in uncovering details of the assassination.

== Political views and opinions ==
Tamim is known for voicing his political views and opinions through social media, particularly on Twitter. In 2015, he was publicly rebuked by Emirati minister of foreign affairs Abdullah bin Zayed on Twitter as a result of expressing support for former Yemeni president Ali Abdullah Saleh, who at that time was allied with the Houthis. He also criticized the tactics employed by coalition forces during the 2015 intervention in Yemen.

In February 2017, he praised United States President Donald Trump's ban on individuals from seven Muslim-majority countries.

In October 2017, Tamim wrote about the Qatar diplomatic crisis on Twitter in Arabic; "If the World Cup leaves Qatar, Qatar's crisis will be over ... because the crisis is created to get away from it". According to observers, the message appeared to imply that the Qatar diplomatic crisis was enacted due to Qatar hosting the world's biggest football event. In reaction to media coverage of his tweet, Tamim tweeted; “I said Qatar is faking a crisis and claims it's besieged so it could get away from the burdens of building expensive sports facilities for the World Cup”

After the November 2017 Sinai mosque attack by Daesh, he blamed the attack on Qatari news network Al Jazeera and suggested that Egypt should "bomb" the network in retaliation.

On April 3, 2018 he tweeted "Why Indians are disciplined? While sedition, criminality and smuggling in the Pakistani community are rampant" he also mentioned that the Pakistanis pose a serious threat to the Gulf communities because they bring drugs with them. His comments came after Dubai authorities arrested gang of Pakistanis involved in smuggling drugs.
