= Dubai Police Force =

Law enforcement agency in Dubai

Dubai Police Force شرطة دبي
- Common name: Dubai Police

Agency overview
- Formed: 1 June 1956; 70 years ago
- Employees: 30,000+
- Legal personality: Police force

Jurisdictional structure
- Operations jurisdiction: Emirate of Dubai, United Arab Emirates
- Map of Dubai Police's jurisdiction
- Area: 4,114 km^{2} (1,588 sq mi)
- Population: 4,177,059
- Governing body: Government of Dubai
- General nature: Local civilian police

Operational structure
- Headquarters: Al Twar, Dubai, United Arab Emirates
- Sworn members: 17,500+
- Agency executives: Abdullah Khalifa Al Marri, Commander-in-Chief; Dhahi Khalfan Tamim, Deputy Chief of Police

Website
- dubaipolice.gov.ae

The Dubai Police (Arabic: شرطة دبي) is the police force of the Emirate of Dubai, United Arab Emirates. Dubai Police Force was established on June 01, 1956, and was based in Naif Fort until 1973 when it was moved to Al Twar.

The Dubai Police Force has 30,000 employees who are responsible for policing an area of 4,114 square kilometres and a population of over 3 million people. They come under the jurisdiction of the Ruler of Dubai.

The force is currently led by Abdullah Khalifa Al Marri, whose formal title is the Commander-in-Chief of Dubai Police; he succeeded Khamis Mattar Al Mezaina in 2017. Dhahi Khalfan Tamim has served as the Deputy Chief of Police and General Security since 2013.

== History ==
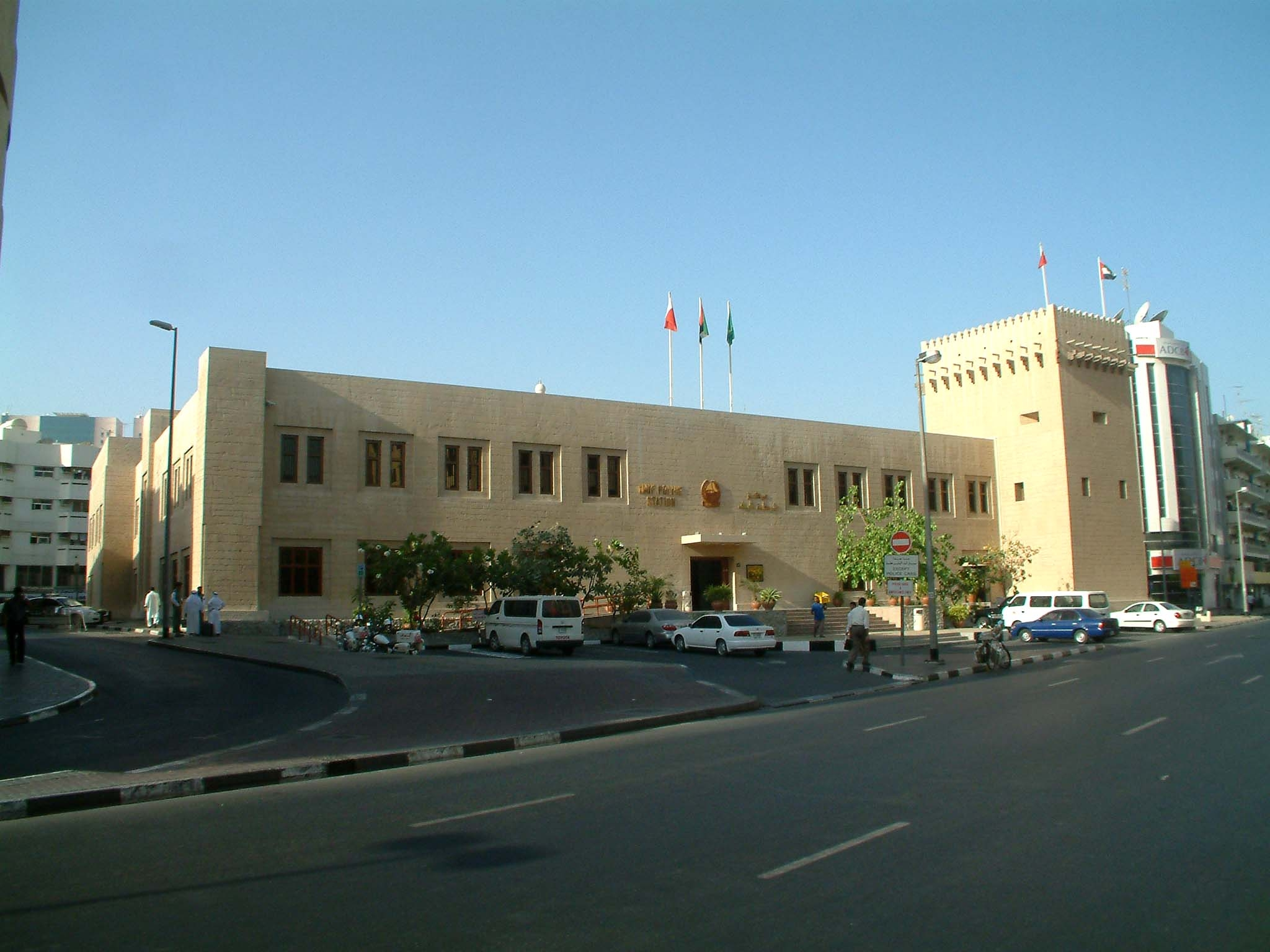
Naif Fort was the Dubai police headquarters from 1956 until 1973. The fort is now a museum located in Naif.

Dubai Police was founded on 1 June 1956 and was headquartered in Naif with only 29 members. The first police station was based at Naif Fort. The size of the force increased to 105 members in 1960 and to 430 members by 1967. In 1973, the force moved its headquarters to their current location in Al-Twar.

During every New Year's Eve in Dubai, Dubai Police in cooperation with Dubai Roads and Transport Authority, organize traffic and police distribution across the city as well coordinate ambulance, civil defence, and emergency medical services.

In May 2017, Dubai Police announced an initiative to incorporate smart services, such as using smart police robots for people to pay fines and report crimes as well as police stations that do not require human employees for general services. These stations were to be called Smart Police Stations (SPS).

On 4 January 2018, Dubai Police unveiled a new logo, and launched a smartphone App and website.

In 2023, the United Arab Emirates’ first ever all-female SWAT team competed in the SWAT World Challenge for the Dubai Police.

In 2024, Dubai Police reported a 99 percent crime detection rate using forensic evidence.

Dubai Police will launch the Middle East’s first floating Smart Police Station (SPS) which will be operational by the end of 2026.

== Organizational structure ==
=== Commander-in-Chief of Dubai Police ===
==== Deputy Commander-in-Chief of Dubai Police ====
- Headquarter Regulatory Office
- Police Judiciary Council
- Resilience Center
- Internal Audit Office
- Esaad Card Center
- Governance and Compliance

==== Assistant Commander-in-Chief for Community Happiness and Logistic Support Affairs ====
- Protocol Department
- Institutional Development Office
- General Department of Community Happiness
- General Department of Logistic Support

==== Assistant Commander-in-Chief for Ports Affairs ====
- Institutional Development Office
- General Department of Airports Security
- Ports Police Station
- Dubai Police Air Wing

==== Assistant Commander-in-Chief for Academic Affairs and Training ====
- Hemaya Schools Office
- Institutional Development Office
- Dubai Police Academy
- General Department of Training

==== Assistant Commander-in-Chief for Excellence and Pioneering Affairs ====
- Institutional Development Office
- General Department of Excellence and Pioneering
- General Department of Human Rights in Dubai Police
- Future Foresight And Decision Support Center

==== Assistant Commander-in-Chief for Operations ====
- Institutional Development Office
- General Department of Traffic
- General Department of Operations
- General Department of Organization Protective Security and Emergency
- General Department of Transport and Rescue

==== Assistant Commander-in-Chief for Administration Affairs ====
- Dubai Police Health Center
- Institutional Development Office
- Center for Quality of life
- Financial Control Department
- General Department of Administrative Affairs
- General Department of Human Resources
- General Department of Artificial Intelligence
- General Department of Finance

==== Assistant Commander-in-Chief for Criminal Investigation ====
- Institutional Development Office
- Oyoon Center
- General Department of Forensic Science and Criminology
- General Department of Anti-Narcotics
- General Department of Punitive and Correctional Establishments
- General Department of Criminal Investigations (CID)
  - Institutional Development Office (Police Stations)
    - Bur Dubai Police station
    - Al Muraghabat Police Station
    - Nad Al Sheba Police Station
    - Al Rifaa Police Station
    - Jebel Ali Police Station
    - Hata Police Station
    - Al Qusais Police Station
    - Al Rashidiya Police Station
    - Al Barsha Police Station
    - Naif Police Station
    - Al Khawaneej Police Station
    - Dubai Mounted Police
    - Criminal Information Department

=== Dubai Police Commanders in Chief ===
Name of the Commander in Chief	Year of Service
Peter H.Clayton	1956-1958
Peter George Lorimer	1958-1965
Jack Briggs	1965-1975
Abdullah Belhoul	1975-1980
Dhahi Khalfan Tamim	1980-2013
Khamis Mattar Al Mezaina	2013-2016
Abdullah Khalifa Al Marri	2017–Present

== Departments ==
The Dubai Police Force operates under a general commander and his deputy, who in turn work under the police chief and his own deputy. The general commander forms part of an organisational office which, with a decision making support centre, organises fifteen separate departments.

They include the General Department of Operations, which controls all patrols, emergency responses, and search and rescue operation, the General Department of Artificial Intelligence, which was established in 2001 and renamed in 2018, and the General Department of Forensic Science and Criminology which first opened in 1982. At that time, it was affiliated with the General Department of Criminal Investigations. Given the increase and expansion of the scope of work in the field of forensic evidence and the multiplying of criminal work departments, in 2000 AD, the laboratory was renamed the General Administration of Forensic Evidence. On April 14, 2007, the name of the General Administration of Criminal Evidence and Criminology was changed because it also was using science to investigate crime in addition to its administrative tasks.

=== General Department of Operations ===
Round the clock telephone lines help to electronically control all patrols from this department, with 2,000 land lines and 178 fax machines, and utilising wireless equipment to locate both car and foot patrols. The department also coordinates all emergency responses as well as search and rescue operations on land and sea.

=== General Department of Artificial Intelligence ===
It was established in 2001 as part of the aims of Sheikh Mohammed Bin Rashid Al-Maktoum, Prime Minister of the United Arab Emirates, to form an electronic government. In 2008, 30% of UAE Nationals are assigned to work in the E-services Department to fulfill their duty. In 2014, Director-General Khalid Nasser Al Razooqi introduced Google Glass to the police force to issue fines and identify wanted cars. In 2018, the department was renamed to correspond to the new government direction towards artificial intelligence.

=== General Department of Criminal Investigation ===
Crime fighting department of the Dubai Police, its objectives are:

1. Dealing with petty crime (quarrels, swearing, defamation, etc.).
2. Dealing with offences against the person, such as murder, rape, armed robbery, kidnapping, etc.
3. Dealing with organized crime (drug trafficking, money laundering, internationally wanted criminals, etc.).
4. Social services, such as lost property, things found, certificates of good conduct, licences of all kinds etc.
5. Employing scientific evidence (such as Forensic Medicine, fingerprints, documents, arsons, chemical analysis, firearms, etc.).
6. Employing identity recognition means (such as fingerprints, DNA, criminal records, etc.).
7. Crime prevention methods (such guidance, directives, follow-up, statistical projections, periodicals, etc.).
8. Contains the Dubai section of the International Criminal Police (Interpol).

=== General Department of Forensic Science and Criminology ===
The criminal laboratory opened for the Dubai Police in 1982. At that time, it was affiliated with the General Department of Criminal Investigations. Given the increase and expansion of the scope of work in the field of forensic evidence and the multiplying of criminal work departments, in 2000 AD, the laboratory was renamed the General Administration of Forensic Evidence.

On April 14, 2007, the name of the General Administration of Criminal Evidence and Criminology was changed because it also was using science to investigate crime in addition to its administrative tasks. This science studies criminal phenomena and their causes as related to the person or the environment surrounding him or her in order to determine the motives leading to crime and to combat it and limit its spread. Forensic science employs several disciplines, including psychology and sociology.

On March 30, 2016, His Highness Sheikh Mohammed bin Rashid Al Maktoum, Vice President and Prime Minister of the UAE and Ruler of Dubai, opened the new General Department of Criminal Evidence and Criminology.

== Services ==
Dubai Police provides a variety of specialist services to the public. The eCrime Self-Service allows the public to record a complaint regarding cybercrimes, whether for their persons or for their properties. This service is specific to crimes happened within the geographical scope of Dubai city and people who benefit from this service are people who are affected by e-crimes.

The "On the go" service was introduced in 2015 by Dubai Police General Command in association with the ENOC Group with the goal of swiftly reporting minor traffic incidents. The service will assist city drivers in filing straightforward accident reports in the event of collisions, and more recently it has expanded the provision of services for filing unidentified accident reports.

Dubai Police recorded an average emergency response time of 2 minutes and 24 seconds in the third quarter of 2023. This is helped by the use of drones.

== Police stations ==
There are currently twelve Dubai police stations in the city.

- Al-Rifaa
  - This station was established in the 1970s to secure the Bur Dubai region. It has been reopened in different premises on two occasions, 1979 and 1992.
- Al-Muraqqabat
  - This station was established in 1974.
- Al-Rashidiyah
  - Al-Rashidiyah was created in 1976 as part of Al-Muraqqabat, however it became an independent station in 1984, and was moved to newer premises in 2000.
- Naif
  - The original headquarters of the Dubai Police force, Naif Fort was constructed in 1929, and was used as a prison until the founding of the force in 1956.
- Al-Qusais
  - Al-Qusais was founded in 1977 and moved to new premises in 1999.
- Hatta
  - This station was established in 1974, and also moved to new premises, this time in 1976.
- Nad Al-Sheba
  - This station opened in 1994 in Zabeel, though subsequently moved.
- Jebel Ali
  - This station was built in 1971, and renovated in 2000.
- Ports
  - Ports police station was also built in 1971, and watches over the Rashid Port.
- Bur Dubai
  - This station was founded in 1979.
- Al-Barsha
  - This new station opened in 2014 and covers the new developments in Al-Barsha and the surrounding locales.
- Al-Khawaneej
  - This new station opened in 2022 and covers the new developments in Al-Khawaneej and the surrounding areas, the stations is considered to be a smart police station and is one of the different branches of the smart police stations located around in Dubai.

== Uniform, equipment, and vehicles ==
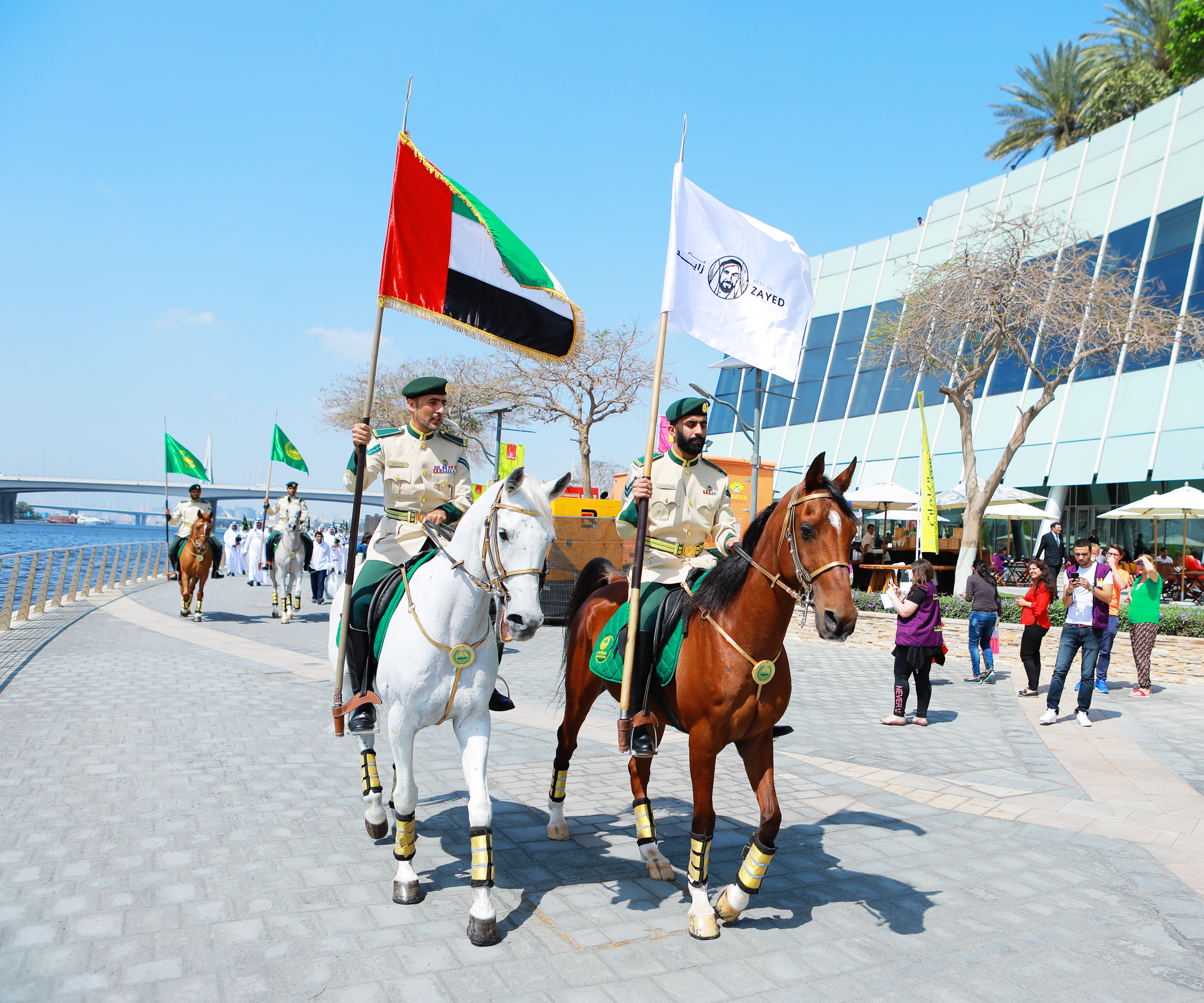
Dubai Police officers on horseback

The standard uniform of a Dubai police officer is an olive green shirt with a red band running under the left arm and looped through the left epaulette, a dark green beret with a golden badge depicting the police force's seal, olive green trousers, and black boots. Female officers are required to wear a hijab.

Alternatively, officers wear a light brown shirt and trousers, though the rest of the uniform remains the same. High-ranking officers wear a combination cap and rank badges on the collar, together with their light brown uniform.

Officers carry semi-automatic handguns such as the Caracal and SIG Sauer pistols. Their special emergency unit uses a varied arsenal of weapons such as the MP5 submachine gun, Glock 17 pistols, Ithaca 37 shotguns, M4 and M16 variants, X26 tasers, flash grenades, and other weapons depending on the situation.

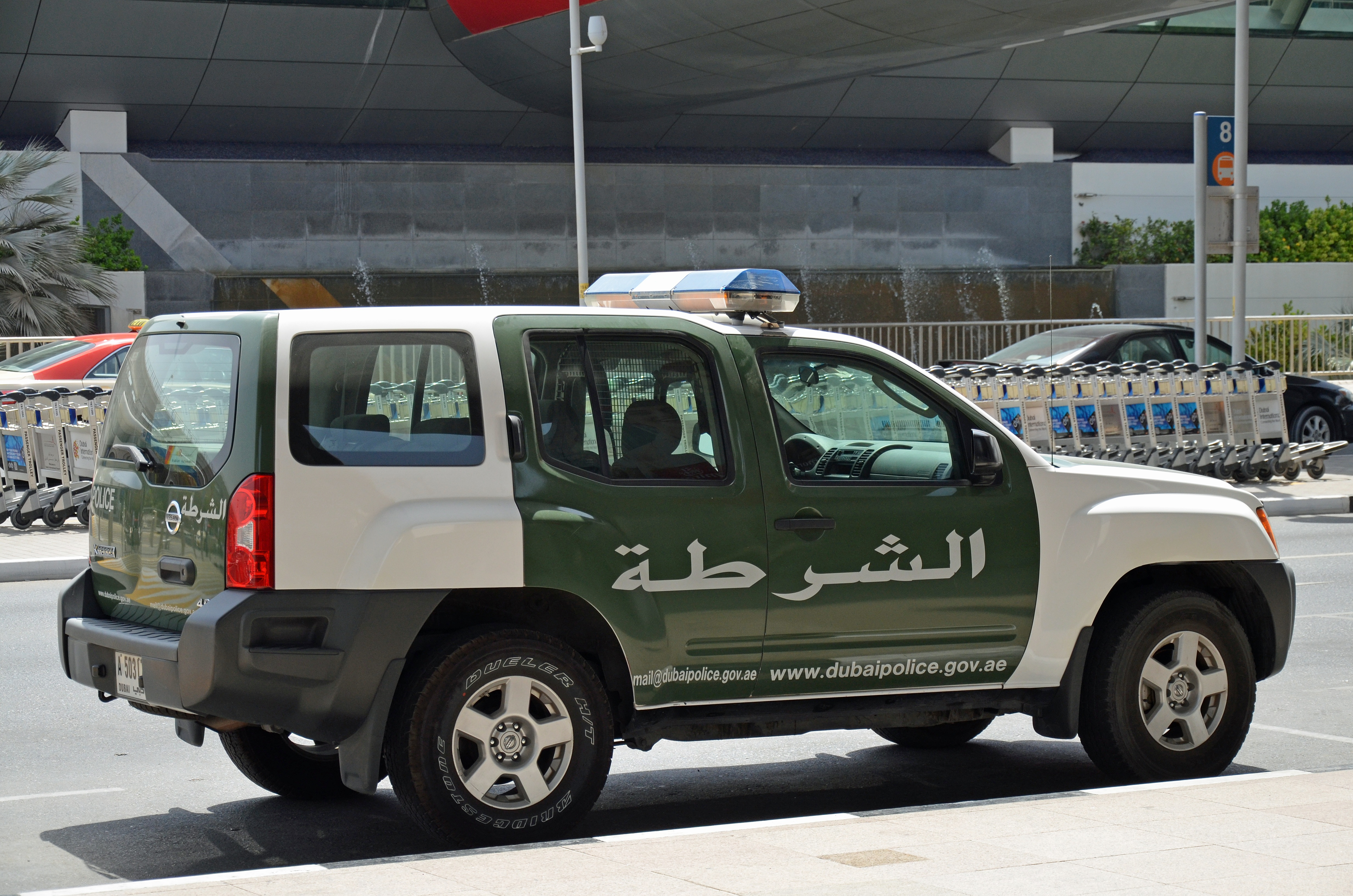
Dubai Police Nissan Xterra in 2012 showing the old livery.

Dubai Police Force vehicles are painted with a white and dark green colour scheme, with blue emergency lights. Every Dubai police vehicle has the force's website and email addresses printed on it.

The police force uses Dodge Chargers, Nissan Pathfinders, and Toyota Land Cruisers. Other non-exotic police vehicles such as Toyota Prados, Fortuners, and Chevrolet Luminas have also been pictured. The police force also operates a fleet of BMW 5 Series E60 cars. In terms of SUVs, they have a Brabus-tuned G-Wagen (known as the G700; revealed at the 2013 Dubai Motor Show), as well as at least one normal Mercedes one. The pickup trucks in the fleet of vehicles come with winches to easily tow or rescue other vehicles or objects.

In 2013, the force fielded new eco-friendly patrol cars. In addition to cars, the force also employs motorcycles, helicopters, and boats.

=== Police vehicles ===
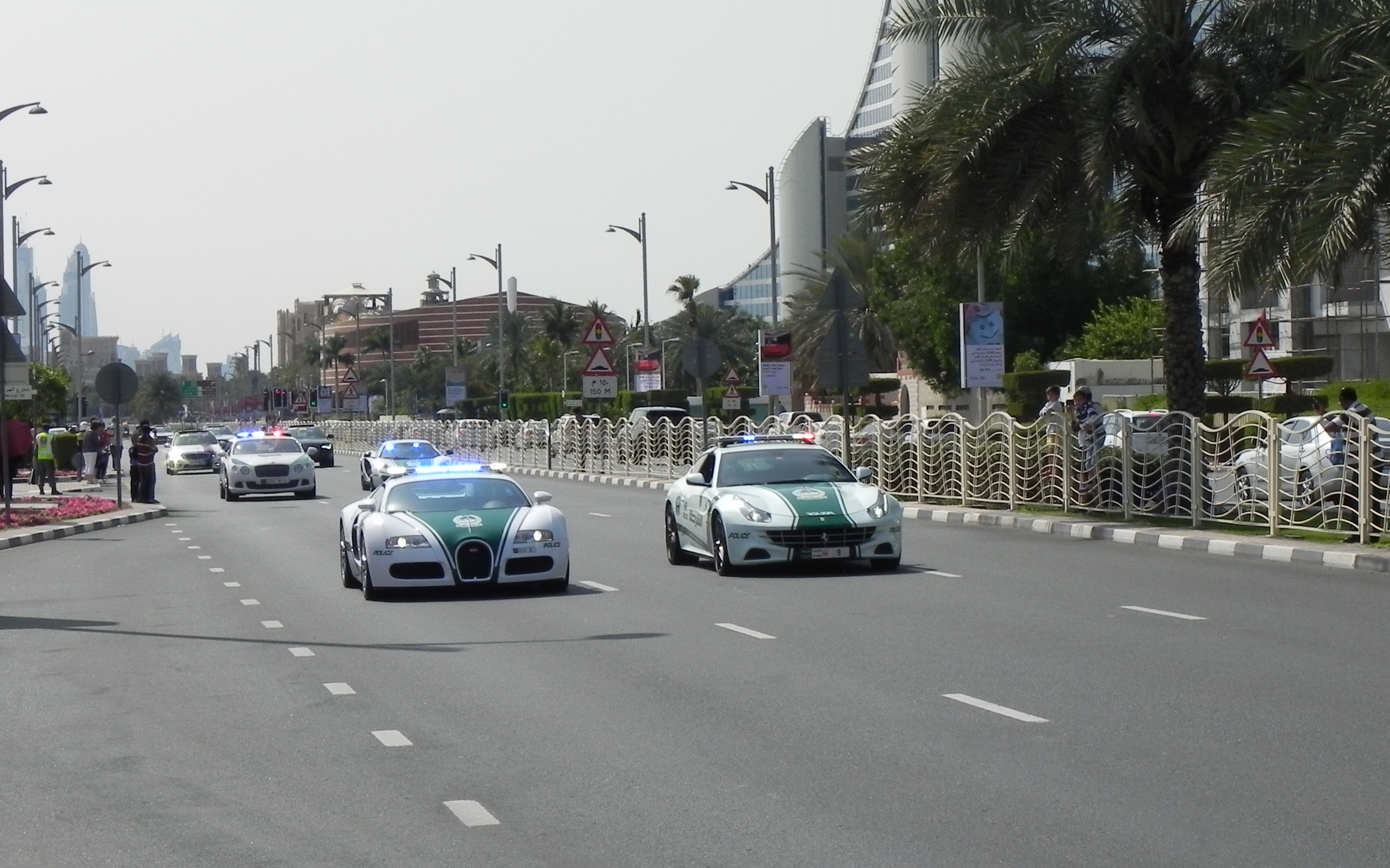
A Dubai Police Bugatti Veyron and Ferrari FF

The Dubai Police Force operates a variety of performance cars, luxury cars, supercars, and concept cars for policing. The rarity and cost of the vehicles, as well as their unusual role in policing, tend to attract the interest of foreigners. However, the belief that they are standard patrol cars or used in pursuits is false—the exotic cars are only used for traffic enforcement in tourist areas, and policing in the rest of the city, including responses to emergencies and pursuits, is conducted by regular patrol units in standard patrol cars.

The exotic car collection of the Dubai Police began in 2013, with the introduction of a Lamborghini Aventador. Guinness World Records awarded the Dubai Police Force the record for "fastest police car in service" for having a Bugatti Veyron in service, which has a top speed of 253 mph (407 km/h). The previous record holder belonged to the Italian police force, who had a Lamborghini Gallardo LP560-4.

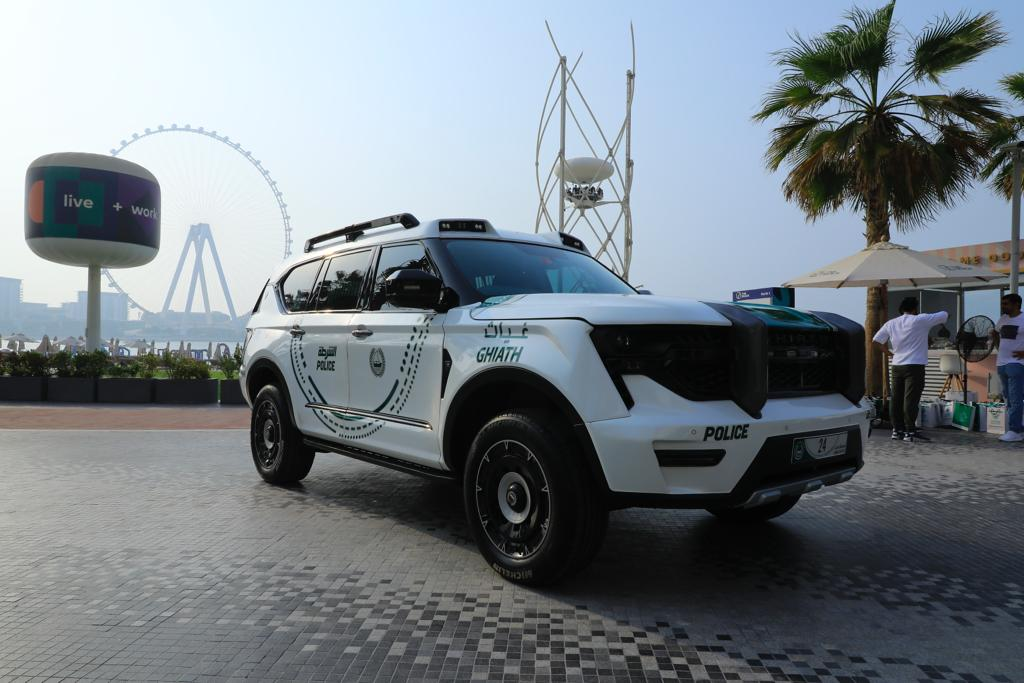
Dubai Police W Motors Ghiath— 10 have been delivered, out of an order of 400.

Among Dubai's fleet of police cars are:

- Alfa Romeo Giulia
- Alfa Romeo Stelvio
- Aston Martin One-77
- Aston Martin Vantage
- Audi R8
- Bentley Continental GT
- Bentley Bentayga
- BMW i3
- BMW i8
- BMW M6 Gran Coupé
- Bugatti Veyron
- Cadillac CT5
- Chevrolet Camaro SS
- Dodge Viper
- Ferrari FF
- Ford Mustang by Roush
- Genesis GV80
- Hongqi E-HS9
- Jaguar F-Type
- Hummer H3
- Lamborghini Aventador
- Lamborghini Urus
- Lamborghini Temerario
- Toyota Supra
- Mercedes-AMG GT 63 S 4-Door Coupé
- Mercedes-AMG SL 63
- Tesla Cybertruck
- Rolls-Royce Cullinan

== Museum ==
The Dubai Police Museum, located at Al-Mulla Plaza, opened on 19 November 1987. It comprises three exhibit halls, as well as documenting anti-drug efforts of the police force, and the force's prison systems. On 19 November 1987, the International Council of Museums placed the museum on the record of Arab Museums.

== Education ==
The Dubai Police Academy provides degrees, such as License in Law and Police sciences, Masters in law and Doctoral degree in law.

== Dubai Smart Police Stations ==
Smart Police Stations (SPS) are a series of new self-service centers offering smart police services across Dubai. The service enables customers to apply digitally for many services, such as criminal, traffic, certification and others, without a traditional visit to the police station.

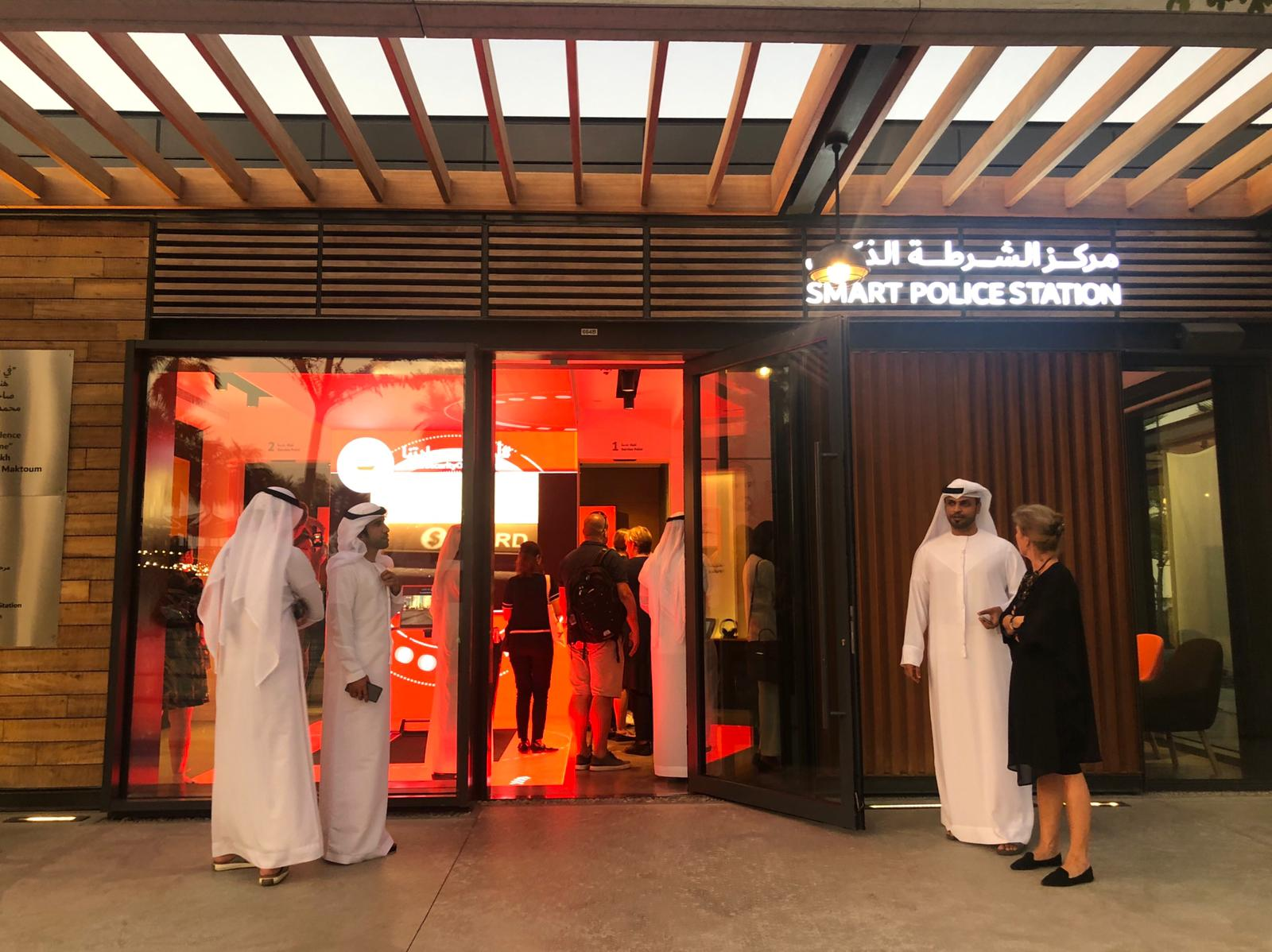
Dubai Police Smart Police Station

=== History ===
The stations are located in new areas and property developments. The stations allow customers skip queues and complete transactions digitally, and with no human contact. The force aims to increase its use of artificial intelligence and reduce police stations visits by 80 percent.

In September 2023, Dubai Police in partnership with the Serbian Ministry of Interior helped establish the first Smart Police Station in Serbia.

The Netherlands National Police Corps adopted the Dubai Police SPS and opened its first smart police station in 2024, named SPS Utrecht. The new station is located in the Utrecht Centraal station and was established with support from Dubai Police.

=== Services ===
There are 22 SPS stations and they operate 24 hours a day and operate daily, including on weekends and holidays. The stations provide services in six languages, and they provide services in the following categories:

- Criminal Services: Customers are able to register for a request for victim support, reporting a bounce cheque, filing a labor complaint, getting aid from the police eye, filing criminal complaints, request for home security, inquire about police reports and report human trafficking.
- Traffic Services: The SPS offers the services of reissuing a traffic accident report, applying for a traffic status certificate, applying for changing a vehicle color and to pay fines online.
- Certificates and Permits: The customers can apply for lost item certificates, good conduct certificates, corpse entry permits, night work permits, road closure permits, clearance certificates and To Whom It May Concern certificates.
- Community Services: For the community, the SPS allows customers to apply for tourist security services, events security requests, request for leaders at your service, job vacancies, heart patient services, delivery of found items and the search for lost items.

=== Smart Police Stations Locations ===
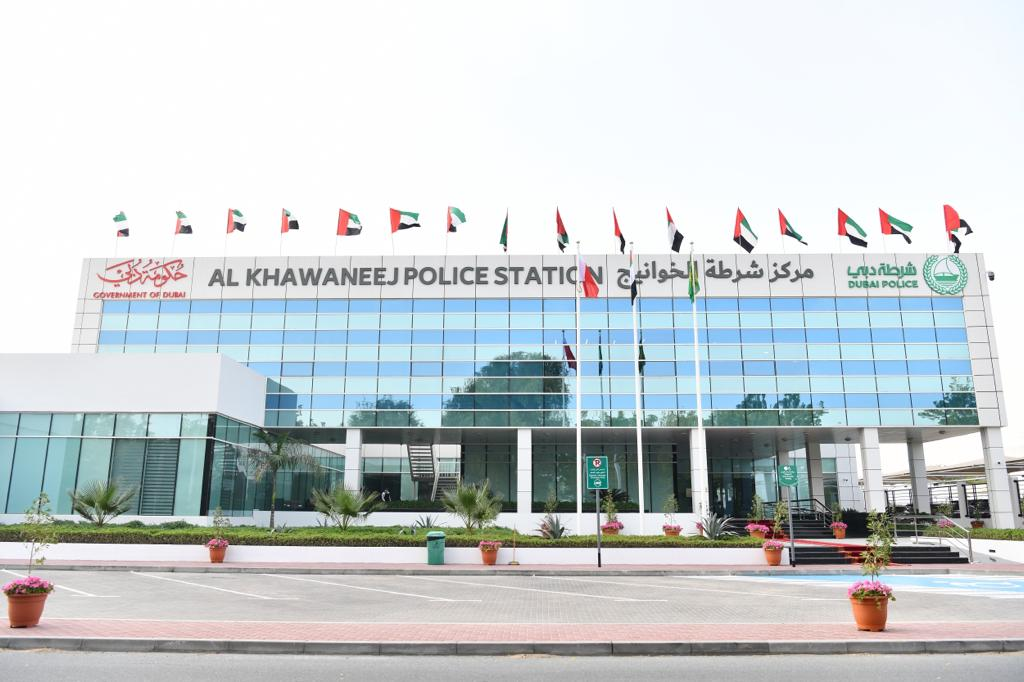
Al Khawaneej Police Station

There are currently many smart police stations located all around Dubai:

- City Walk SPS
- La Mer SPS
- Dubai Design District SPS
- Al Seef SPS
- Palm Jumeirah SPS
- Arabian Ranches SPS Walk-in
- Al Barsha Police Station
- Jebel Ali Police Station
- Al Muraqqabat Police Station
- Dubai Silicon Oasis SPS Walk-in
- DAFZA SPS
- HQ Reception
- Hatta Suburban Point
- AL Eyas Suburban Point
- Al Lesaily Suburban Point
- Expo SPS
- Al Khawaneej Police Station

== World Police Summit ==
The World Police Summit is an annual event held in Dubai, United Arab Emirates. The summit includes over 230 speakers from 150 participating countries and more than 150 sessions.

Hosted by Dubai Police The World Police Summit was formed in 2022. The concept of collaboration and innovation are key to improving public safety and reducing crime. The conference covers a wide range of topics, including crime prevention, cybersecurity, community policing, traffic safety, forensics science, drug trafficking, and the use of force.

== Traffic enforcement and penalties ==
Dubai Police is responsible for enforcing traffic regulations including traffic penalties within the emirate of Dubai. In July 2023, amendments were introduced to the traffic law through Decree No. 30 of 2023. The decree, issued by Mohammed bin Rashid Al Maktoum, Vice-President and Prime Minister of the UAE brought significant changes to penalties for various traffic violations, including the impoundment of vehicles.

Members of the public can pay traffic fines through the official Dubai Police online portal or mobile application, which provides multiple payment methods and instant confirmation of transactions.

Under the provisions of this decree, the Dubai Police are authorized to impound vehicles under specific circumstances. For offenses including unauthorized road races, reckless driving, and driving under the age of 18, Dubai Police may seize vehicles and issue fines ranging from Dh10,000 to Dh100,000 depending on the nature of the traffic offense. Additionally, repeat impoundments within a year double the impoundment period, up to 90 days, with a maximum release fee of Dh200,000.

== Notable initiatives ==
=== Policewomen ===
Dubai Police have established their first all-female land rescue team in the organization's 53-year history in February 2025. This unit comprises 16 dedicated women who will undertake roles traditionally held by men, marking a significant milestone in the UAE and the Middle East. On July 27, 2025 it was reported that for the first time in its 69 years, the Dubai Police will appoint its first ever female brigadier, Colonel Samira Abdullah Al Ali.

=== Hemaya Schools ===
In 2018, the Dubai Police established the Hemaya Schools to provide education for the children of police personnel and civilians, incorporating disability-friendly provisions. In the same year, the inaugural school in Al Karama with a capacity for 1,400 primary and preparatory students, was opened for enrolment. Dubai Police staff are permitted to register up to two children without incurring tuition charges. The school's operations are under the administration of both the Knowledge and Human Development Authority and the Ministry of Education in Dubai.

=== Dubai Police Volunteering Platform ===
Dubai Police developed the Dubai Police Volunteering Platform as a community outreach program to encourage safety, security, and social well-being. The platform gives people and organizations the chance to contribute their time, talents, and resources in support of the goal of the Dubai Police, which is to improve public safety and security.

=== Positive Spirit ===
The Positive Spirit promotes youth participation in sports as a useful social tool for making the most of free time and instills a culture of sports. Through a variety of cultural, community, and volunteer activities, it boosts the happiness and good vibes of society's citizens.

As of 2021, a total of 26 community-based programs, 15 seminars and talks, 30 community-based sporting activities, and 7 community-based cultural competitions were organized by Positive Spirit Initiative in the previous year. The Initiative held events and activities in which more than 41,796 people took part and gained a lot, recording a 96% satisfaction score.

=== Policeman in your Neighborhood ===
As one of its community policing initiatives, the Dubai Police has introduced the "Policeman in Your Neighborhood" platform, in which a Dubai Police officer serves as a point of contact between locals and visitors to Dubai and the General Command of the Dubai Police to keep an eye on and address issues in residential areas.

The program uses a prevention approach that tackles problems head-on, enhances services, reports on infrastructure to relevant authorities as appropriate, and plans events, after-school activities, and workshops to increase youth awareness.

By creating a strong communication channel to collect complaints and settle disagreements amicably, the initiative's staff had effectively contributed to raising security awareness among Dubai residents and citizens and developing a healthy community relationship.

More than 800 members of the public and members of the Dubai Police have volunteered for the project. The volunteers were selected based on their abilities in language, communication, problem-solving, and collaboration because they will be working directly with their neighbors.

=== AI Police ===
Dubai Police introduced an AI digital police officer for tourist assistance and help with enquiries and complaints.

=== Dubai Culture ===
Dubai Culture and Dubai Police entered into an agreement to safeguard heritage assets and signed a memorandum of understanding (MOU) with Dubai Police to enhance cooperation in activating the Heritage Police-Al Asas project in historical neighborhoods.

== Arrests ==
In 2011 British tourist Lee Bradley Brown was arrested by the Dubai police and died in prison after 6 days of custody in a controversial manner.

Police have detained protesters many times. Protests are not allowed in the UAE and there is a law banning criticism of the government and police. Furthermore, a US citizen and a group of others were arrested in 2013 after they made a parody video of Dubai.

In 2018, police arrested a UK national, Dr Matthew Hedges on suspicions of spying for the British government. (See Arrest of Matthew Hedges)

In 2019, Dubai Princess Latifa Al Maktoum escaped Dubai with some other people. She was arrested by Indian and Dubai Police, a few kilometres off the coast of India. She was then taken back to Dubai, where she was sedated and subject to imprisonment.

In September 2023, Dubai Police apprehended six individuals and seized over $1 billion worth of captagon, concealed within furniture. The arrestees were allegedly linked to an international criminal network. The concealed drugs were discovered inside 432 furniture panels and 651 iron and wooden doors, constituting a major seizure in the sphere of global captagon trafficking.

In 2024, The Dubai Police, in partnership with the General Directorate of Residency and Foreigners Affairs in Dubai, the Dubai Municipality, and the Islamic Affairs and Charitable Activities Department, launched the "Fight Begging" campaign.

During the first day of Ramadan in March 2024, authorities in Dubai arrested 17 individuals suspected of begging across the city. Begging is considered an offence in Dubai and is linked to outcomes, like committing crimes and exploiting vulnerable people for unlawful gains. As a part of this campaign, March 2024, saw the arrest of 202 beggars (112 males and 90 females) in the city.

== Awards ==
The Dubai Police team won the Wheelchair Basketball title at the 11th Nad Al Sheba Sports Tournament, against the Federal Authority For Identity and Citizenship Dubai in the final. The game was held at the Nad Al Sheba Sports Complex.

Dubai Police was facilitated with the Autism-Friendly Certificate (AFC) by the Dubai Autism Centre, recognising the force’s commitment to creating a safe and inclusive environment for individuals with autism.

== See also ==
- Law enforcement in the United Arab Emirates
- Sex trafficking in Dubai
