= D 85 road (United Arab Emirates) =

Road in Dubai, United Arab Emirates

D 85
- د ٨٥
- Baniyas Road
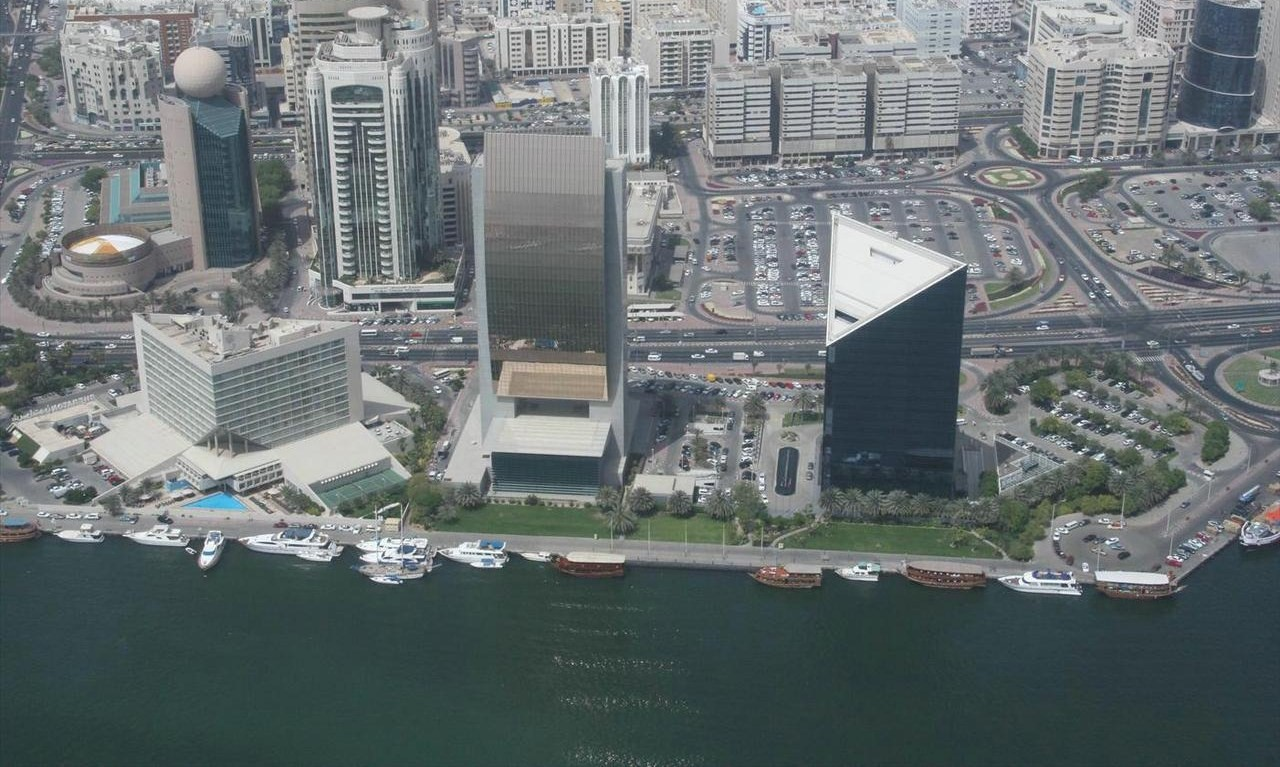
- D 85 borders the Dubai Creek

Route information
- Length: 7.9 km (4.9 mi)

Major junctions
- D 89 (Al Maktoum Road) D 92 (Al Shindagha Tunnel) Umm Hurair Road (Al Maktoum Bridge)

Location
- Country: United Arab Emirates
- Major cities: Dubai

Highway system
- Transport in the United Arab Emirates; Roads in Dubai

D 85 (Arabic: د ٨٥), also known as Baniyas Road, is a road in Dubai, United Arab Emirates. The road begins near the north end of the Deira Corniche, and runs beside Dubai Creek south-eastwards. Passing important landmarks along the creek, D 85 ends near the Dubai Creek Golf & Yacht Club.

Important landmarks along the D 85 route include the Hyatt Regency Dubai on the Deira Corniche, the Deira Twin Towers, Baniyas Square, Etisalat Tower 1, Dubai Municipality, and the Deira City Centre. D 85 intersects with other roads to provide access to Bur Dubai — it intersects with D 92 (Al Mina Road/Al Khaleej Road) near Port Rashid to form the Al Shindagha Tunnel and with Umm Hurair Road in Deira to form the Al Maktoum Bridge.

The word Baniyas is a reference to the dynastic tribe of the Al Maktoums.
