= Dubai Chamber of Commerce and Industry (building) =

General information
- Status: Completed
- Type: office
- Location: Rigga Al Buteen, Dubai, UAE
- Coordinates: 25.26028°N 55.315282°E
- Completed: 1995

Height
- Roof: 91 metres (299 ft)

Technical details
- Floor count: 18

Design and construction
- Architect(s): Nikken Sekkei

Dubai Chamber of Commerce and Industry (Arabic: غرفة تجارة وصناعة دبي), also referred to as the Chamber of Commerce Building, is a building in Dubai, United Arab Emirates (UAE). Located in eastern Dubai in Deira, the building is the headquarters of the Dubai Chamber of Commerce and Industry. It is located in the Rigga Al Buteen community, along Dubai Creek and is part of the old Dubai downtown.

At 91 metres (299 ft) in height, the Chamber of Commerce building was the seventh-tallest building in Dubai at the time of its construction in 1995 (after Dubai World Trade Centre, Deira Tower, Dubai Creek Tower, Arbift Tower, Al Reem Tower and Etisalat Tower 1). When seen from Bur Dubai, the building is located to the right of the National Bank of Dubai headquarters.
