= Al Shindagha Tunnel =

Tunnel in Dubai, United Arab Emirates

Shindagha Tunnel
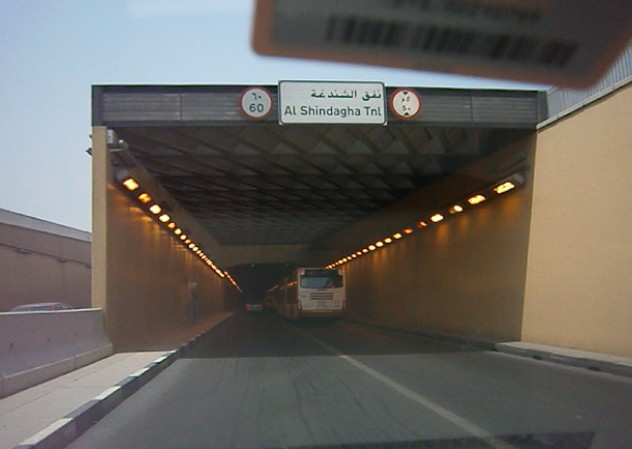
- Al Shindagha Tunnel East entrance
- Interactive map of Shindagha Tunnel

Overview
- Official name: Al Shindagha Tunnel
- Location: Dubai, United Arab Emirates
- Coordinates: 25.272796°N 55.295048°E
- Status: Open

Operation
- Opened: 1975
- Rebuilt: not yet
- Operator: Roads and Transport Authority
- Traffic: 55,000 vehicles per day

Technical
- Design engineer: Mr. Erick
- No. of lanes: 4 (2 lanes in each directions)
- Operating speed: 60 km/h (37 mph)
- Tunnel clearance: 5 meters

Al Shindagha Tunnel (Arabic: نفق الشندغة) is a road tunnel under the creek of Dubai, United Arab Emirates.

Opened on 19 December 1975, it was managing volumes of some 55,000 vehicles daily by 2010. The tunnel connects the neighborhoods of Al Ras, Deira and Al Shindagha in Bur Dubai. It is the only road tunnel crossing Dubai Creek - the other crossings are (in order of construction), Maktoum Bridge, Garhoud Bridge, Business Bay Crossing and the Infinity Bridge. The Dubai Metro also passes under the creek.

The tunnel has a total of four lanes (two in each direction), a height clearance of 5 meters and speed is limited at 60 km/h (37 mph).

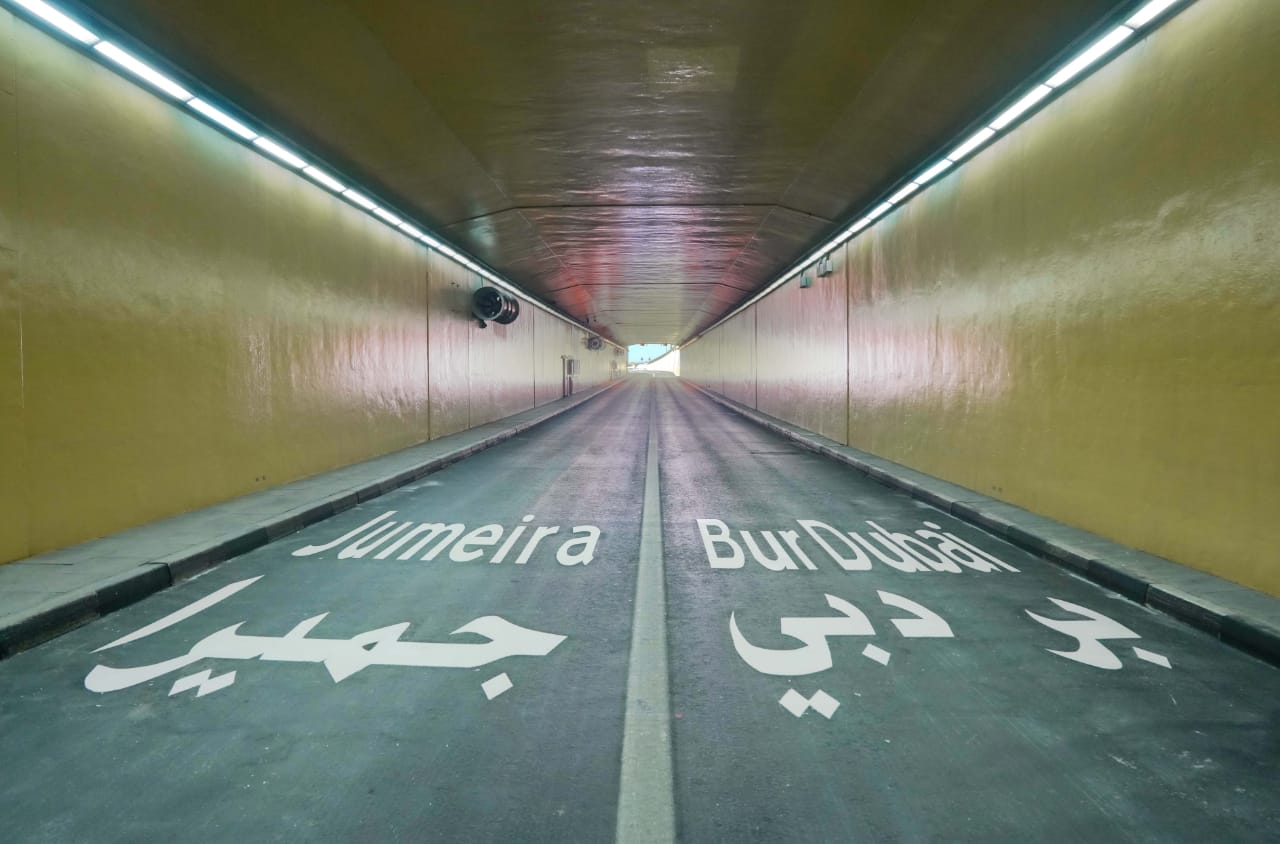
Dubai's Shindagha Tunnel Reopened in March 2022 after repairs

== History ==
For many years the twin town of Deira and Al Ras were connected by a twin bridge which caused delays due to time lags in opening and closing of the vacuoles. Sheikh Rashid bin Saeed Al Maktoum, Dubai ruler entrusted Sir William Halcrow and Partners (SWHP) to do a feasibility study to build a more direct link between the two towns. A bridge nearer to the sea was not possible, the reason being the same when the existing bridge were sited and SWHP proposed a tunnel to be built. An added advantage of the tunnel would be its proximity to the Port Rashid which was also designed by SWHP. Preliminary studies demonstrated the feasibility of both dry land and immersed methods of construction. The contractor company however elected to build the tunnel in the dry. Stage 1 envisages dredging back of Deira bank to form a new diverted channel for shipping and building of a coffer dam out in to the creek from the Shindaga. Stage 2 would be to create an island in the middle of the creek and reopen the original channel for shipping now between the island and the Shindaga, Close the new diverted channel. Then building a new coffer dam in the Deira bank and pump the area dry and start building the tunnel from the Deira side towards the island. Finally on completion the original bank and channel would be reinstated.

It was inaugurated on 19 December 1975 by Khalifa bin Hamad Al Thani, the ruler of Qatar, in the presence of Zayed bin Sultan Al Nahyan, the president of the United Arab Emirates and Rashid bin Saeed Al Maktoum, the vice president of UAE and the ruler of Dubai.

== Replacement ==
Due to the aging of the tunnel, the Roads and Transport Authority is planning to replace tunnel with a bridge. The bridge is set to have multiple lanes to improve the flow of traffic. The Infinity Bridge will soon replace the Al Shindagha Tunnel once decommissioned from service.
