= Dubai Creek Tower (Deira) =

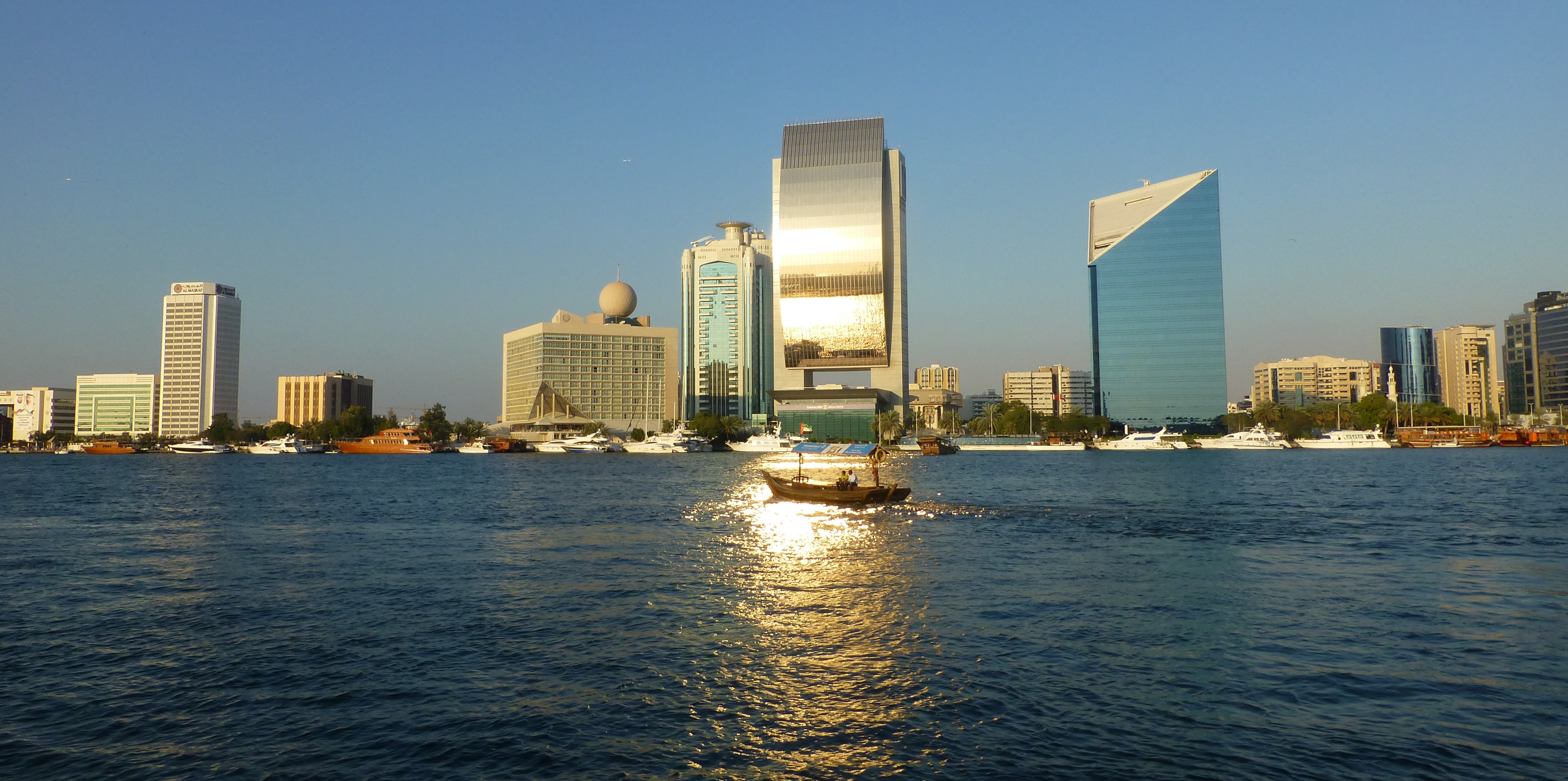
- Dubai Creek Tower (the blue building in the centre)
- Interactive map of the Dubai Creek Tower area

General information
- Status: Completed
- Type: Multi-use
- Location: Rigga Al Buteen, Dubai, UAE
- Coordinates: 25°15′38″N 55°18′52″E
- Completed: 1995

Height
- Roof: 117 metres (384 ft)

Technical details
- Floor count: 27
- Floor area: 35,308 square metres (380,050 sq ft)

Design and construction
- Architects: Khatib & Alami

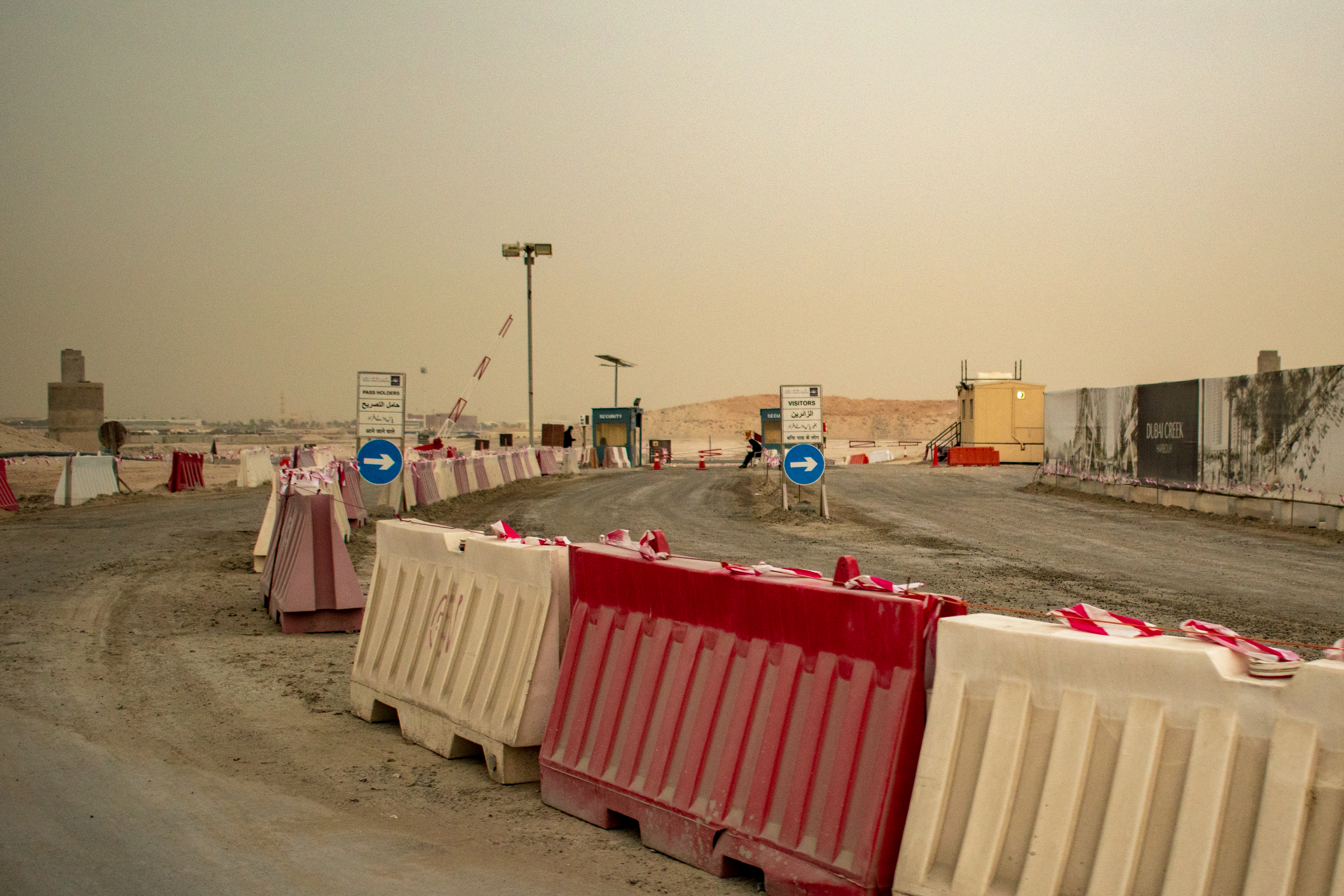
Dubai Creek Tower construction site entrance

Dubai Creek Tower (Arabic: برج خور دبي, burj khūr dubay) is a building in Dubai, United Arab Emirates (UAE). Located along the Dubai Creek, the Dubai Creek Tower is situated in eastern Dubai, in Deira. The building, constructed in 1995, is part of the old Dubai downtown along the Dubai Creek, and was the second-tallest building in Dubai, at the time of its construction (behind the Dubai World Trade Centre). From Bur Dubai, the building appears to the right of the Dubai Chamber of Commerce and Industry building. The Dubai Creek Tower is situated in the locality of Rigga Al Buteen.
