= Al Maktoum Bridge =

Bridge in Dubai, United Arab Emirates

Al Maktoum Bridge جسر آل مكتوم
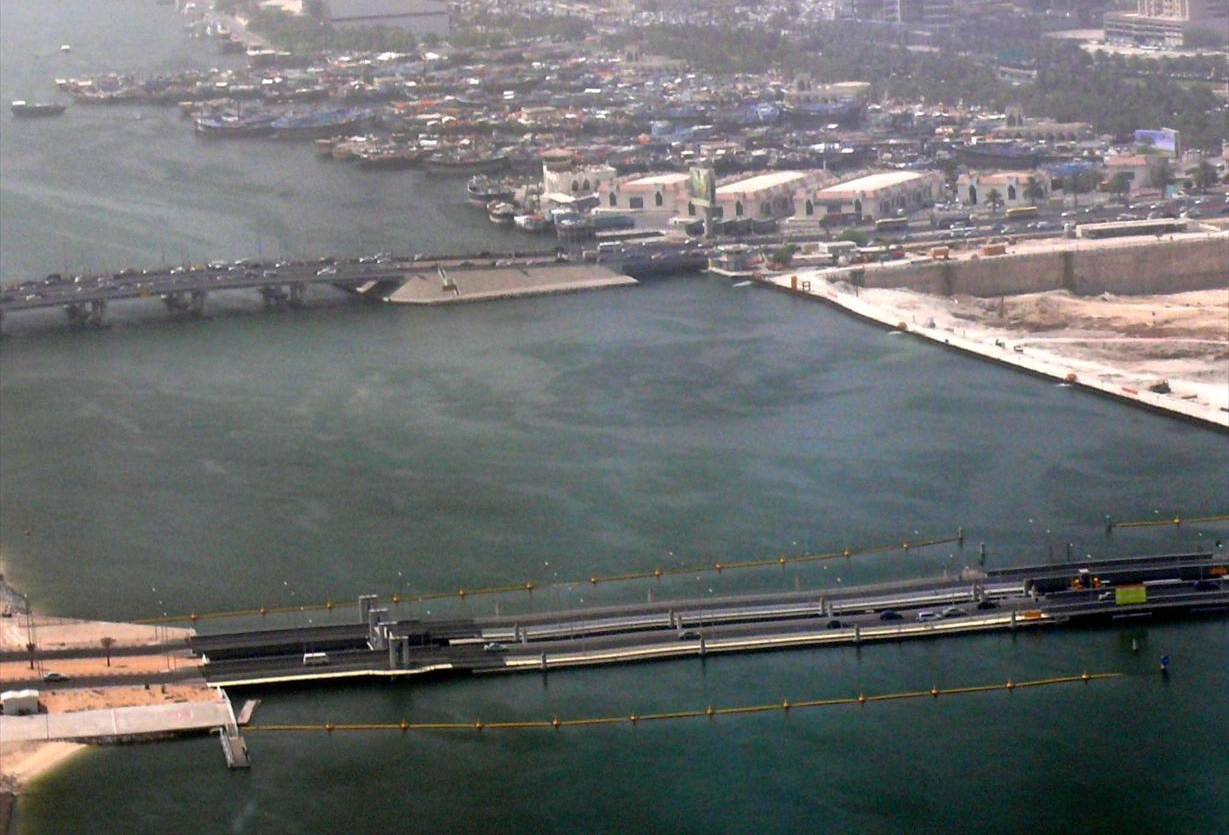
- This is an aerial view of Al Maktoum Bridge (top) and Floating Bridge (bottom) over Dubai Creek in Dubai, United Arab Emirates on 8 May 2008. Deira is on the right and Bur Dubai is on the left. Port Saeed can be seen at the top of the image
- Coordinates: 25.2520°N 55.3212°E
- Carries: Vehicle

History
- Opened: 1963

Location
- Interactive map of Al Maktoum Bridge

Al Maktoum Bridge (in Arabic: جسر آل مكتوم; also known in Arabic as جسر المكتوم) is a bridge that crosses Dubai Creek in Dubai, United Arab Emirates. It is one of seven crossings of the creek and was the first bridge constructed in Dubai, as well as the first permanent crossing of the creek.

The other crossings are Al Shindagha Tunnel, Floating Bridge, Al Garhoud Bridge, Business Bay Crossing and the Infinity Bridge. The Dubai Metro also passes under the creek.

== History ==
Opened in 1963, the bridge enabled people to cross from Bur Dubai to Deira, or vice versa, without using an Abra or water taxi or going all the way around Dubai Creek. To pay for the bridge, a toll was applied to vehicles crossing the creek going from Deira to Bur Dubai. There was no toll for people travelling in the other direction. Once the bridge was fully paid for in 1973, the toll was removed.

The bridge, and roads leading to it, were widened in 2007 to increase the bridge's capacity and to ease congestion. Before the expansion, the peak hour traffic was 8,000 vehicles per hour in the Deira-Bur Dubai direction 8,500 vehicles per hour in the opposite direction. The new lanes were opened on 7 November 2007. By 2024, the bridge was handling up to 22,000 vehicles per hour in both directions.

The road toll (now branded Salik, 'clear'), was re-introduced on the Al Maktoum Bridge on 9 September 2008 for both directions. The toll is not charged when the Floating Bridge, a congestion relief bridge, is closed (from 10pm to 6am from Monday to Saturday, and for the whole day on Sundays) to facilitate the passage of marine traffic.

== Structural Features ==
Al Maktoum Bridge is notable for its hydraulic mechanisms that allow it to open for maritime traffic, accommodating larger vessels navigating Dubai Creek. This capability is supported by a system of hydraulic pumps and sensors, ensuring the bridge can operate smoothly and safely. An ongoing maintenance program involves structural inspections, reinforcement, and updates to withstand wear and tear from both daily traffic and environmental conditions.
