= D85 =

D85 may refer to:

- D 85 road (United Arab Emirates)
- Greek destroyer Sfendoni (D85), a Hellenic Navy ship
- HMS Trouncer (D85), a British Royal Navy convoy escort
- Grünfeld Defence, Encyclopaedia of Chess Openings code
- D85 or Delta 85, Halfway point on the Antarctic Plateau between Concordia Base and Dumont D'Urville, used by the aircraft to stop and refuel
