= National Bank of Dubai (building) =

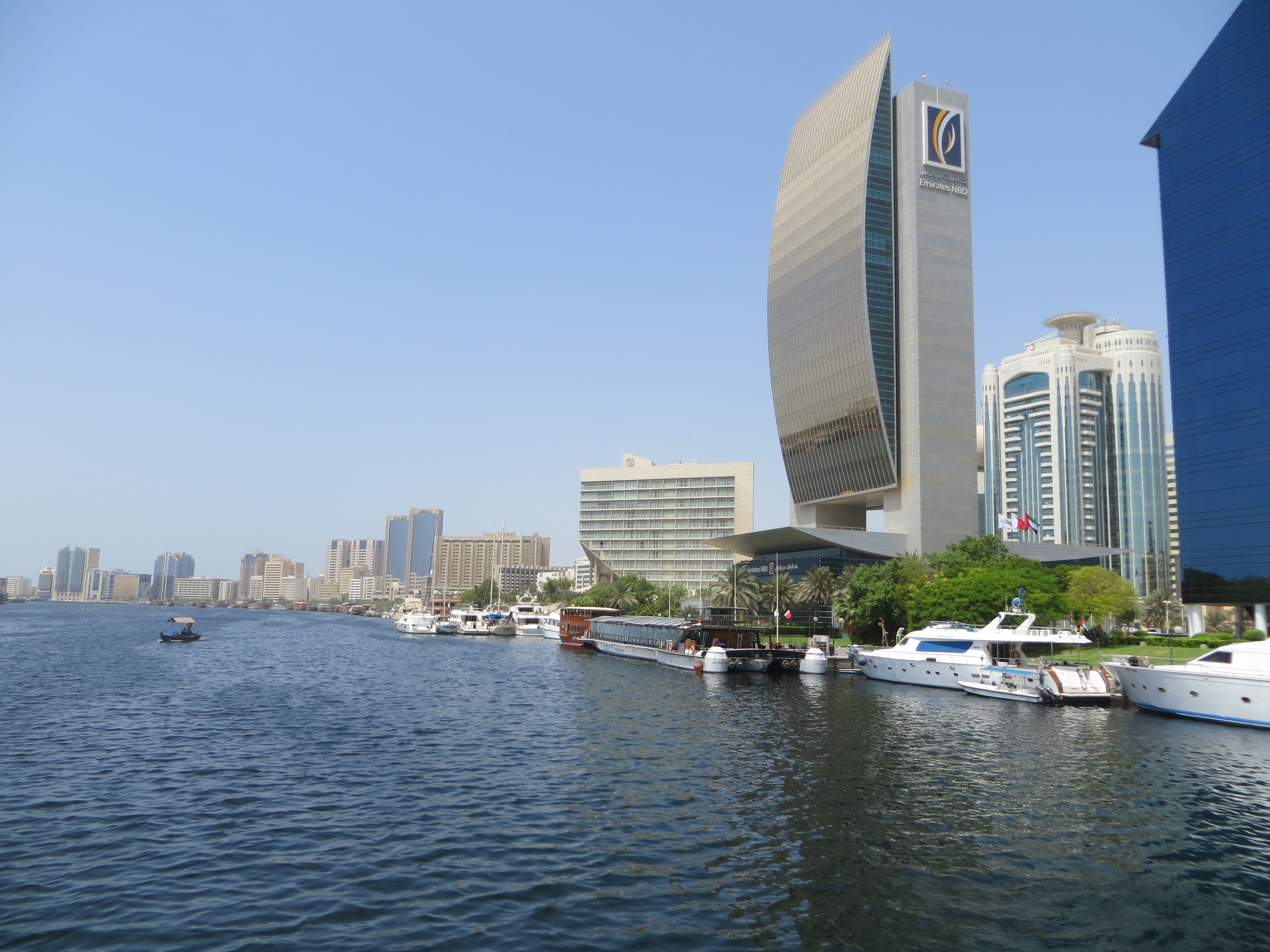

General information
- Status: Completed
- Type: Banking
- Location: Rigga Al Buteen, Dubai, UAE
- Coordinates: 25°15′38″N 55°18′52″E
- Completed: 1998

Height
- Roof: 125 metres (410 ft)

Technical details
- Floor count: 20
- Floor area: 35,308 square metres (380,050 sq ft)

Design and construction
- Architect(s): Dubarch architects and engineers as lead consultants in association with Carlos Ott, NORR International

National Bank of Dubai (NBD) (Arabic: بنك دبي الوطني) is a building in Dubai, United Arab Emirates (UAE). The building, located in eastern Dubai in Deira, houses the headquarters of the National Bank of Dubai.

The building is part of the old downtown of Dubai, along the Dubai Creek. At 125 metres (410 ft), the National Bank of Dubai is the tallest building in Deira, and was the fifth-tallest building in Dubai when built in 1998. The form of the building was inspired by the curved shape of the hulls of the traditional dhows that docked in the Dubai Creek — a concept that also inspired the shape of the Burj Al Arab.
