= Business Bay Crossing =

Business Bay Crossing معبر الخليج التجاري
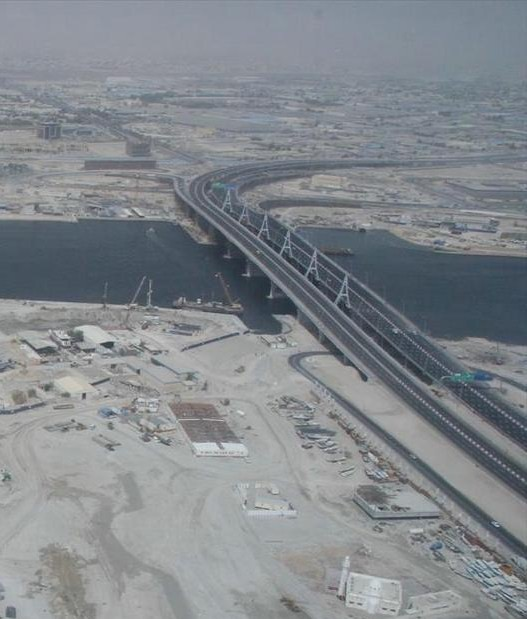
- Coordinates: 25.226490°N 55.346503°E
- Carries: Motor vehicles
- Crosses: Dubai Creek
- Locale: Dubai

History
- Constructed by: BESIX
- Construction start: 2005
- Construction end: 2007
- Opened: June 2007

Statistics
- Toll: Free both ways

The 13 lane Business Bay Crossing (In Arabic: معبر الخليج التجاري; also known as the Ras Al Khor Bridge (جسر راس الخور)) is one of the most recent bridges across Dubai Creek and was opened to traffic in June 2007. Six lanes travel from Deira to Bur Dubai while seven go from Bur Dubai to Deira.

The Business Bay Crossing is located some 1.5 km South of Al Garhoud Bridge near Dubai Festival City and provides a new road corridor to motorists travelling between Bur Dubai and Deira and to Sharjah, in addition to Emirates Road and Sheikh Zayed Road.

The bridge cost 800 million dirhams and has a capacity of 26,000 vehicles per hour. The bridge is 1.6 kilometres (0.99 mi) long, and has a maritime channel with a width of 60 m (196.850 ft) and a height of 15 m (49.213 ft).

The bridge was built by BESIX, a company which made some major bridges in Dubai.The introduction of two new toll gates at Business Bay Crossing on Al Khail Road and Al Safa South on Sheikh Zayed Road will be officially communicated this year. These new Salik toll gates are expected to further regulate traffic flow on some of Dubai’s busiest routes.

== Photo gallery ==
Construction Photos on 31 January 2007

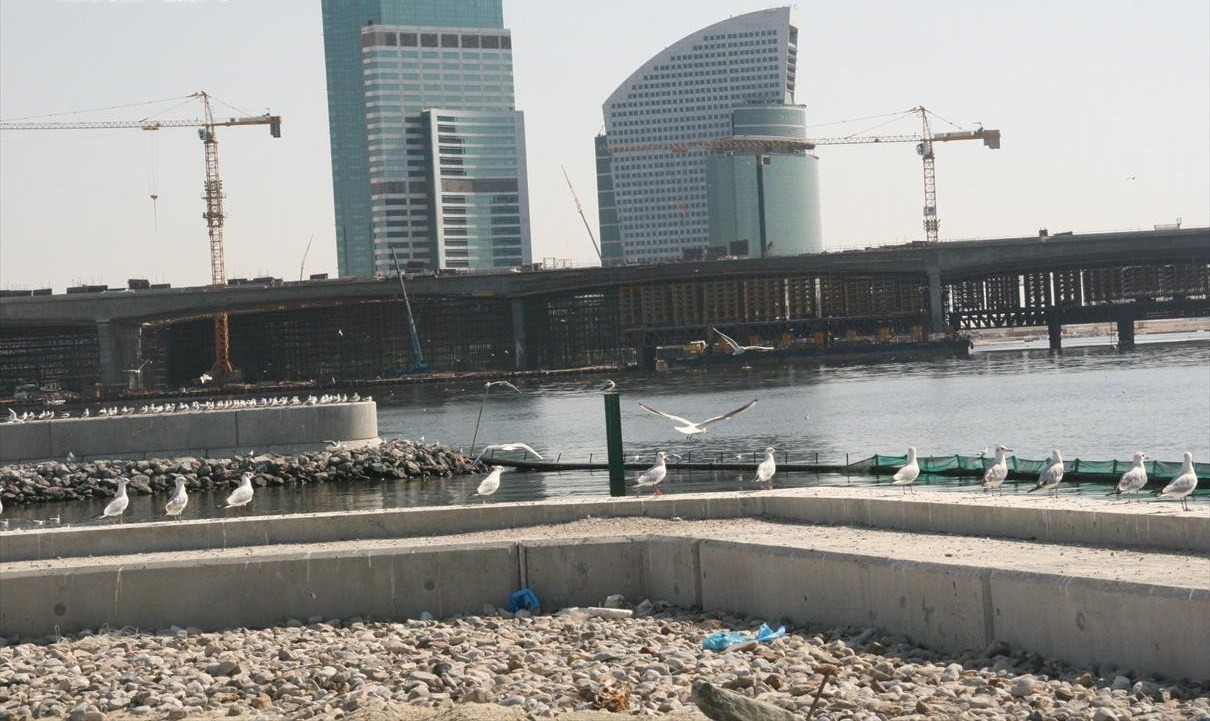

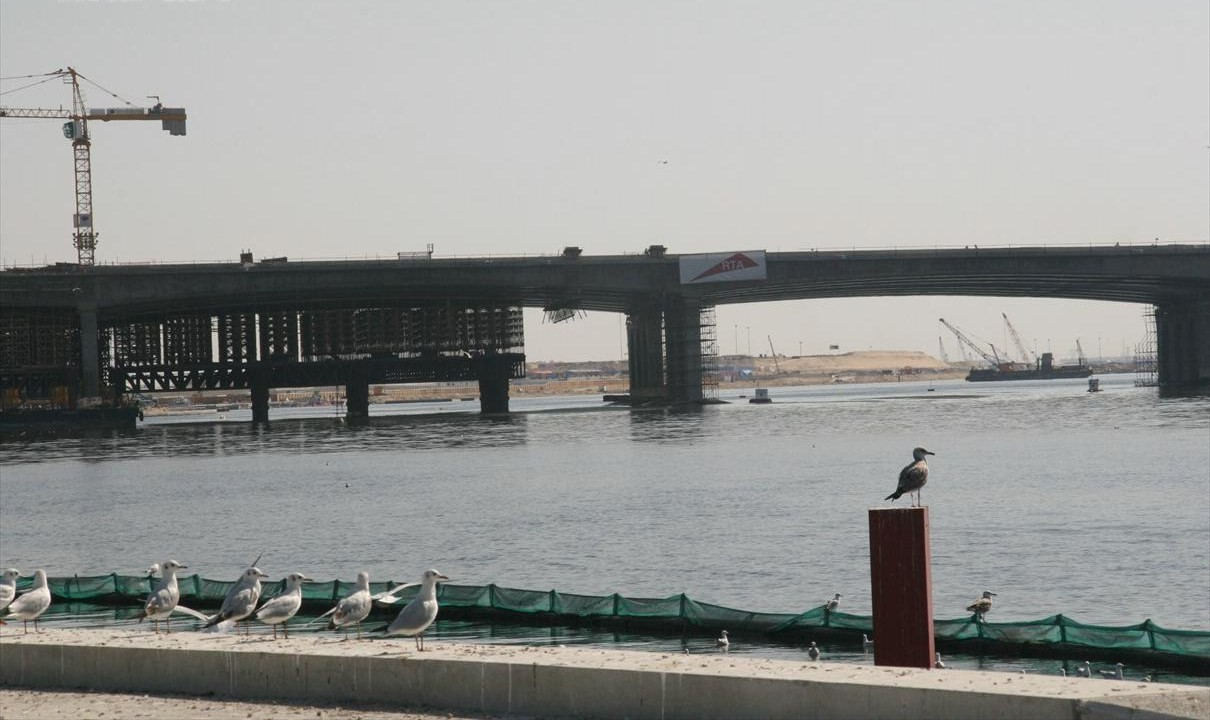

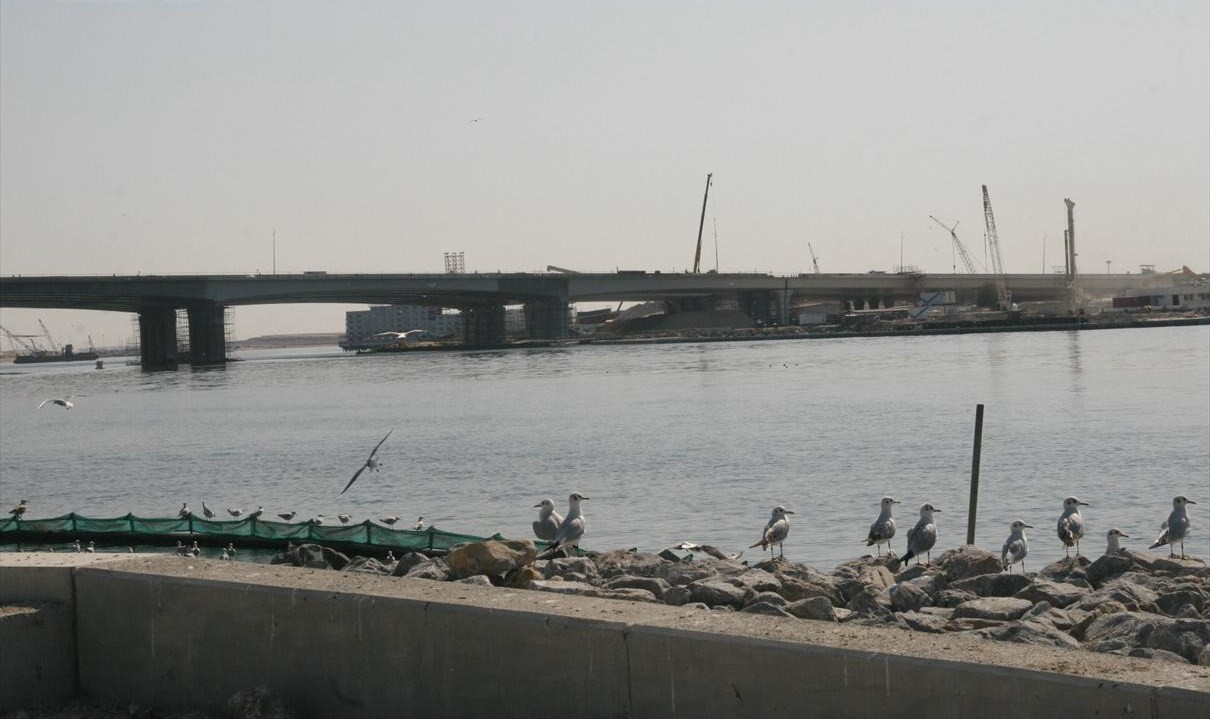

Construction Photos on 7 March 2007

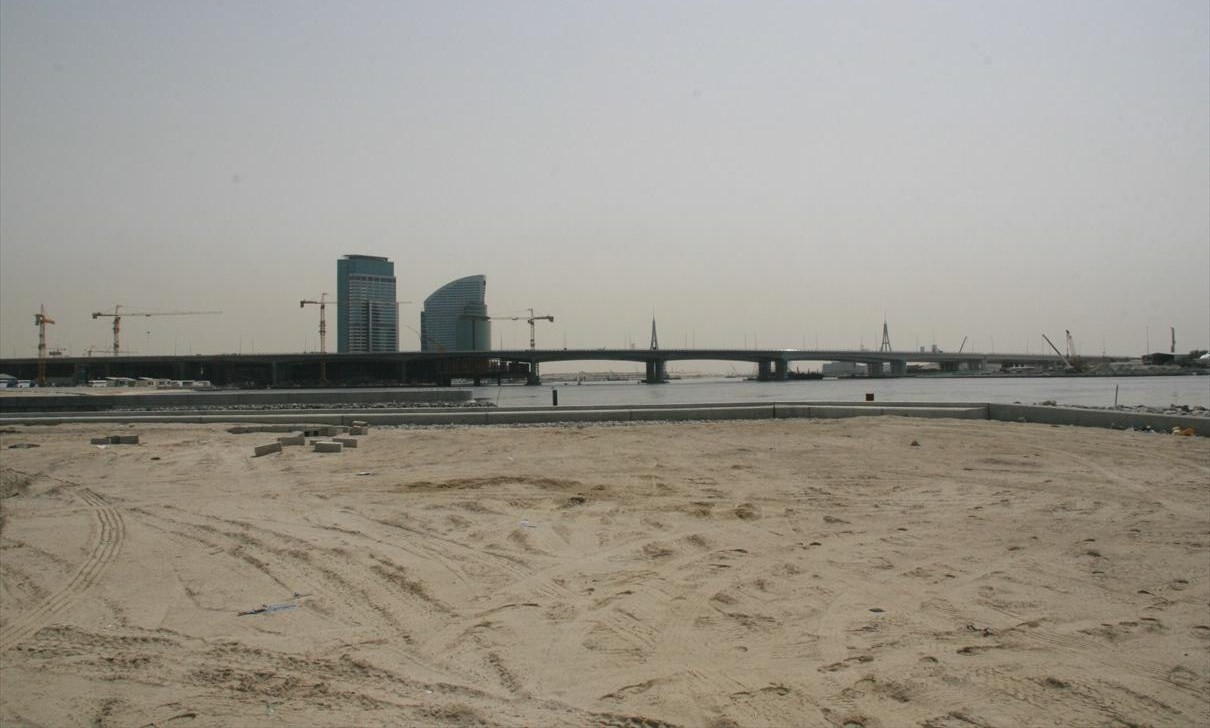

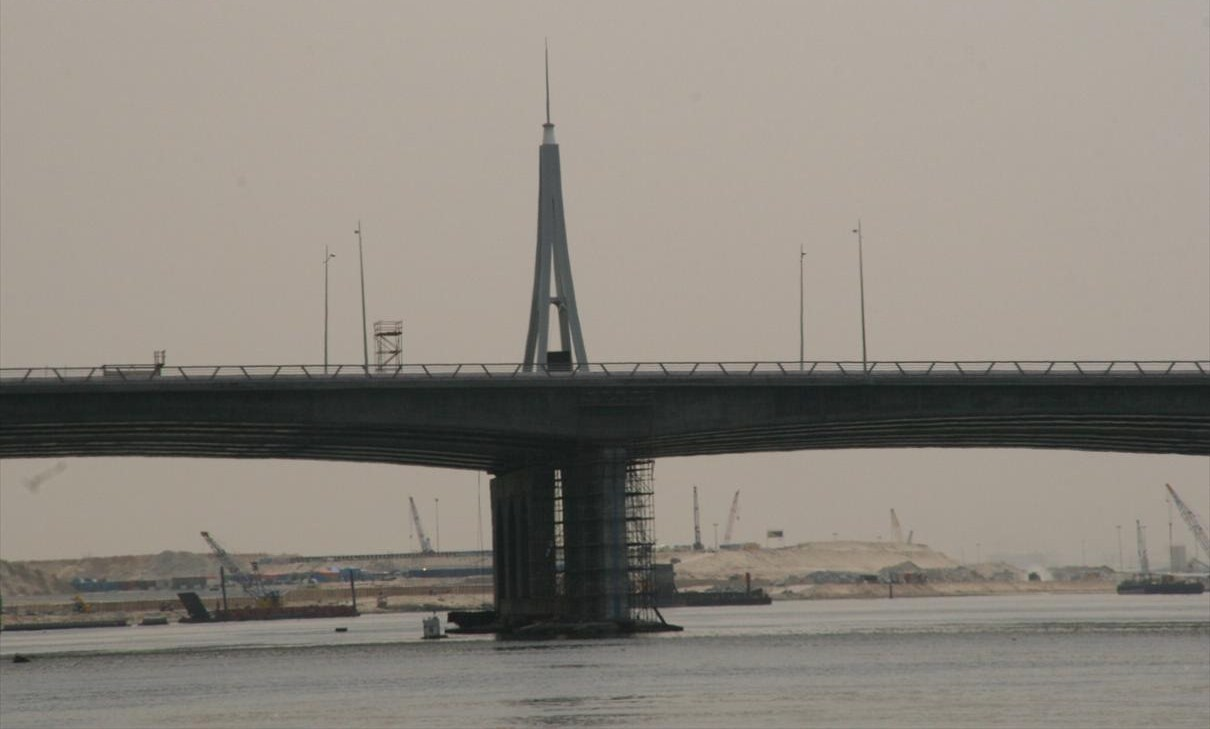

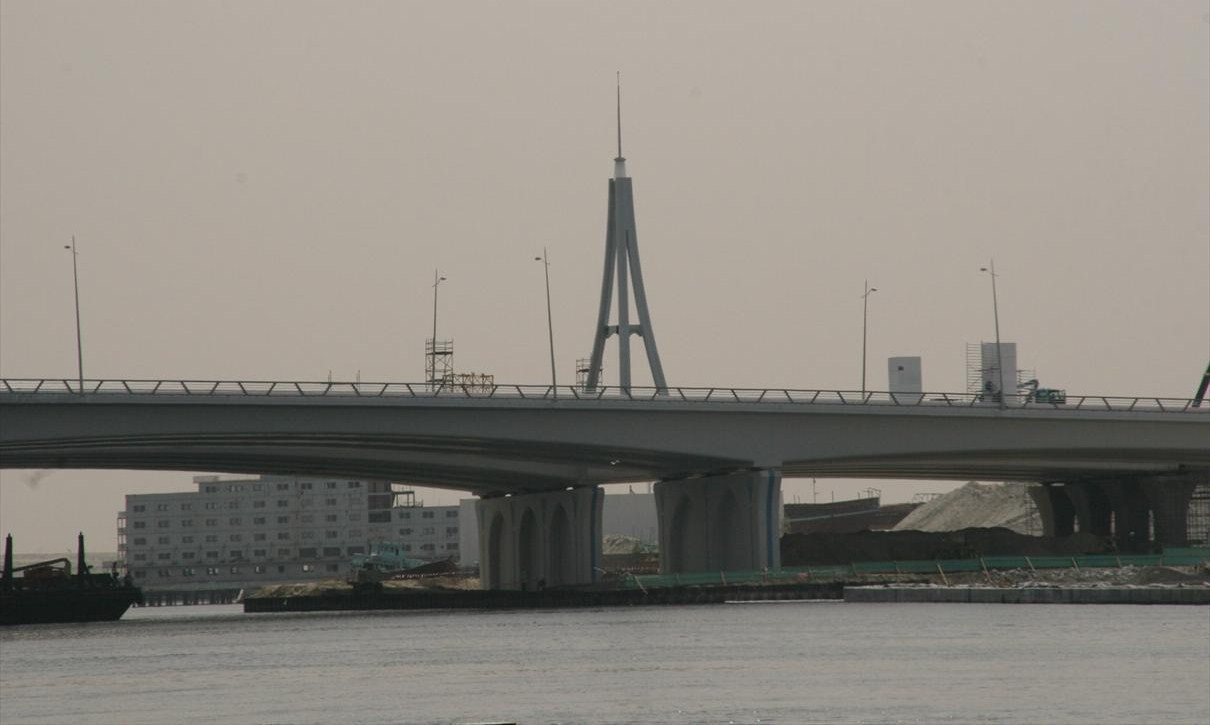

Construction Photos from the air on 1 May 2007

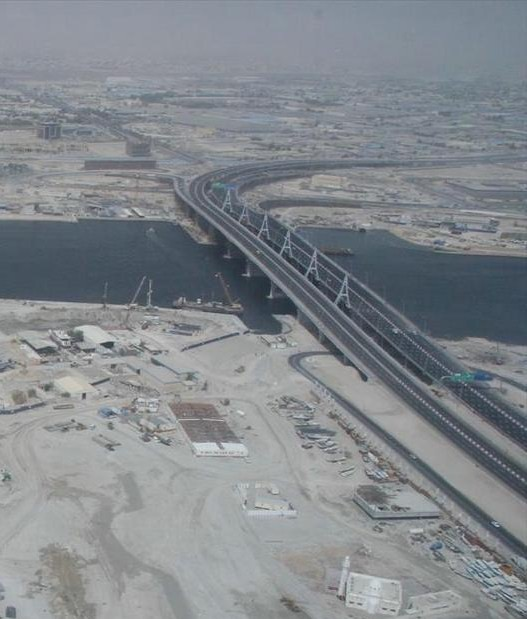

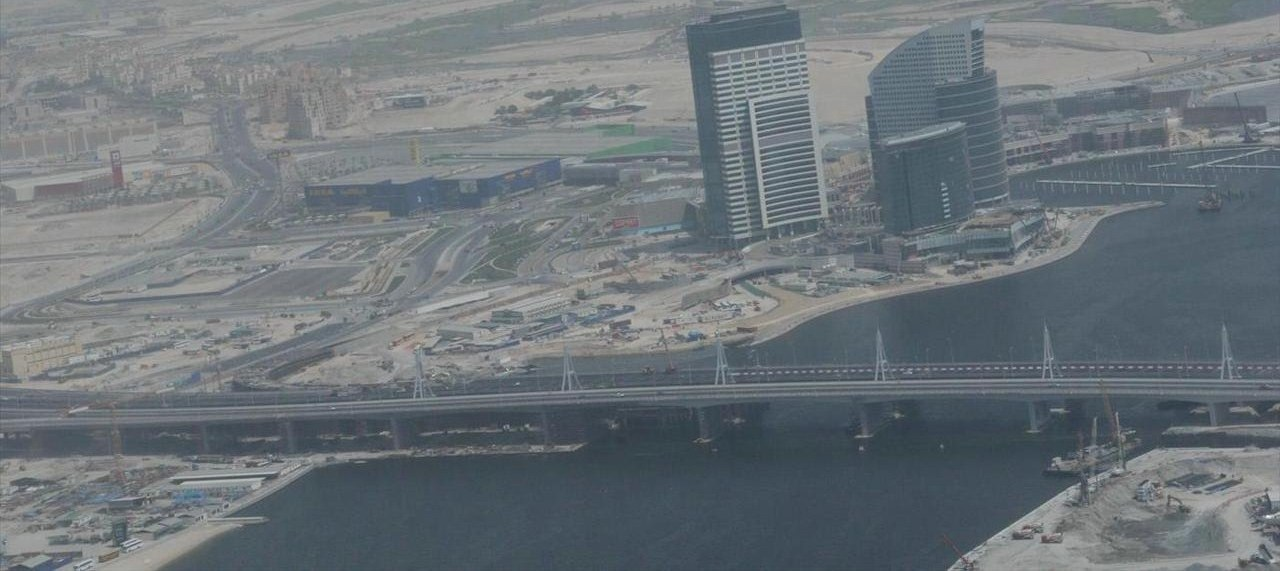

Construction Photo on 31 May 2007

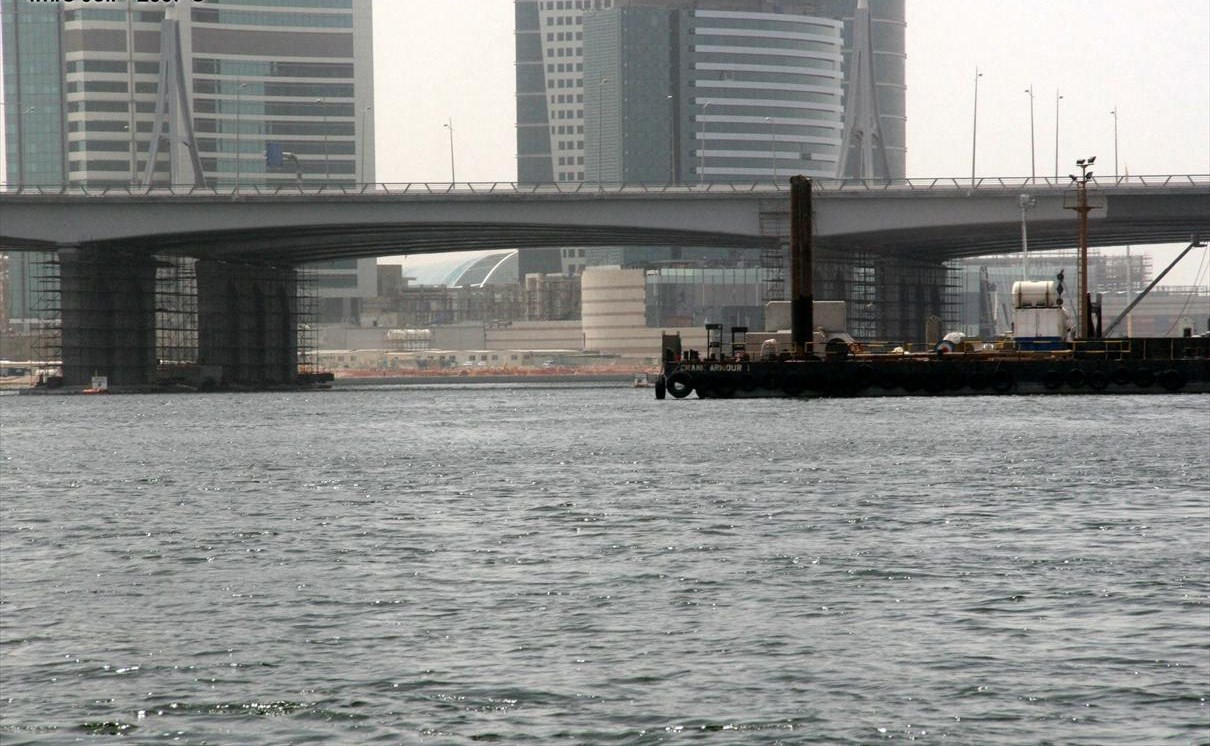
