= Rigga Al Buteen =

Rigga Al Buteen رقة البطين
- Community
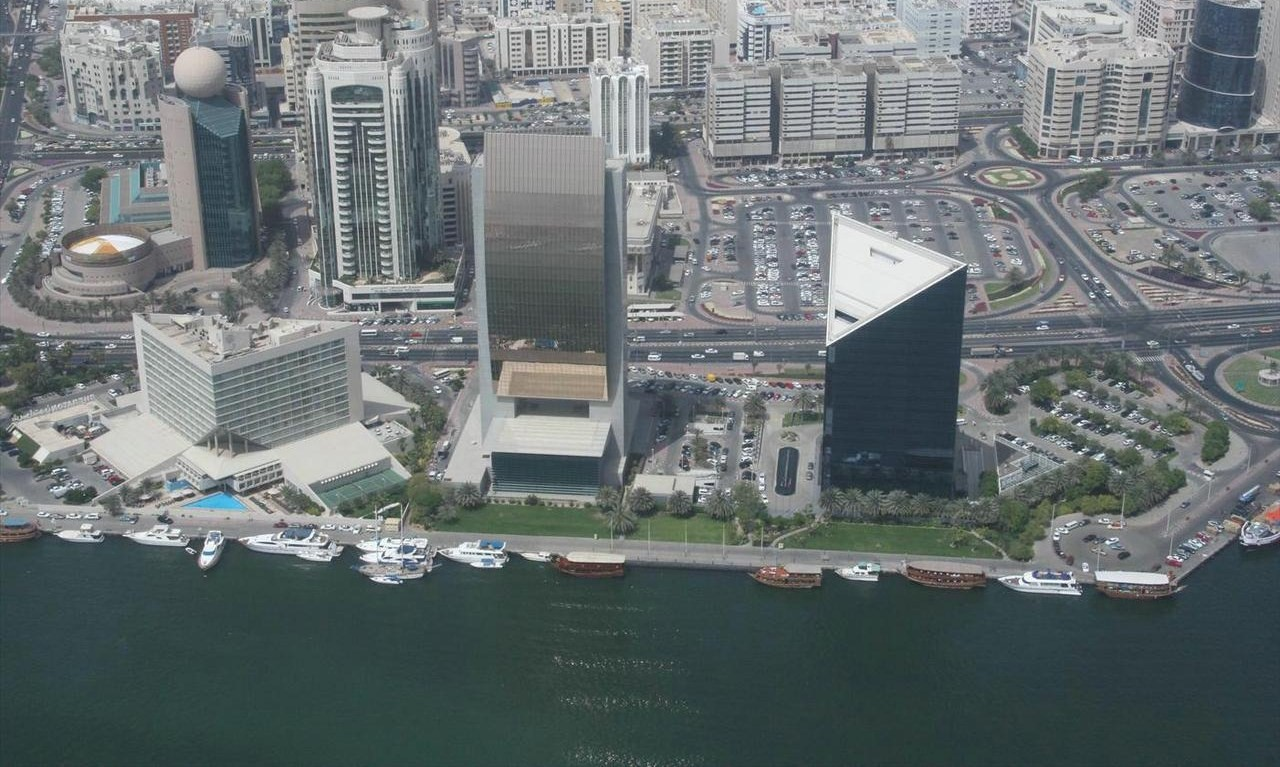
- Aerial view of Rigga Al Buteen
- Interactive map of Rigga Al Buteen
- Coordinates: 25.25999°N 55.31908°E
- Country: United Arab Emirates
- Emirate: Dubai
- City: Dubai

Area
  - Total: 0.684 km^{2} (0.264 sq mi)

Population (2000)
  - Total: 1,394
  - Density: 2,040/km^{2} (5,280/sq mi)
- Community number: 125

Rigga Al Buteen or Riqqa Al Buteen (Arabic: رقة البطين) is a locality in Dubai, United Arab Emirates (UAE). Located in eastern Dubai along Dubai Creek in Deira, Rigga Al Buteen is a small community that houses many prominent landmarks. It has a small residential area, but is primarily known for its important government and municipal buildings. Rigga Al Buteen is bordered to the north by Al Rigga and to the south by Dubai Creek. Port Saeed is located east of Rigga Al Buteen.

Local roads in Rigga Al Buteen follow a grid pattern in some areas, with odd-numbered streets running northeast–southwest and even numbered streets running northwest–southeast, perpendicular to the odd-numbered streets. Local street numbers begin with 1 A Street (near Etisalat Tower 1). Important landmarks in Rigga Al Buteen include Etisalat Tower 1, National Bank of Dubai, Dubai Chamber of Commerce and Industry, Emaar Towers and Dnata. Al Maktoum Bridge, which provides access from Deira to Bur Dubai, is located in the vicinity of Rigga Al Buteen.
