= Al Garhoud Bridge =

Bridge in Dubai, the United Arab Emirates

Coordinates: 25°14′1.99″N 55°20′14.5″E

Al Garhoud Bridge جِسْر ٱلْقَرْهُوْد
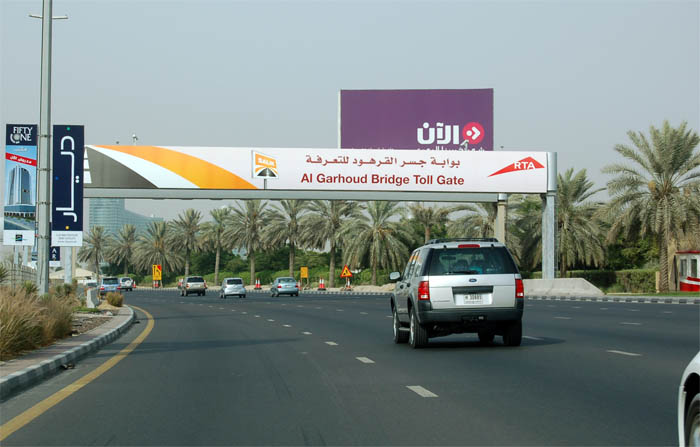
- The bridge with toll gates
- Carries: Vehicles
- Crosses: Dubai Creek
- Locale: Dubai, United Arab Emirates
- Maintained by: Roads & Transport Authority

Characteristics
- Total length: 520 metres (1,710 ft)
- Clearance below: 16 metres (52 ft)

History
- Constructed by: New: BESIX
- Opened: Old: 1976; New: 2008
- Closed: Old: 2008

Al Garhoud Bridge (Arabic: جِسْر ٱلْقَرْهُوْد, romanized: Jisr Al-Qarhūd) is one of three road bridges over Dubai Creek, and one of five crossings, in Dubai, the U.A.E. The bridge forms the eastern end of the road toll of Salik Road Toll that went into effect on 1 July 2007. Since the beginning of Salik, the bridge has seen low amounts of traffic for Dubai.

== Old bridge ==
Opened in 1976, the old bridge was the second bridge constructed that crossed the Creek, after Al Maktoum Bridge. In 2007, nearly 9,000 vehicles crossed the bridge every hour at peak flow. It has been the cause of huge traffic jams in Dubai. The main reason for this was the number of roads that fed into the bridge. On the lanes bound for Bur Dubai, seven lanes (from three different roads) converged into three lanes. For the Deira-bound lanes, five lanes converged into three lanes. Also, the bridge had to be closed to allow large boats to pass under it. The bridge had a total of 6 lanes: 3 lanes in each direction.

== New bridge ==
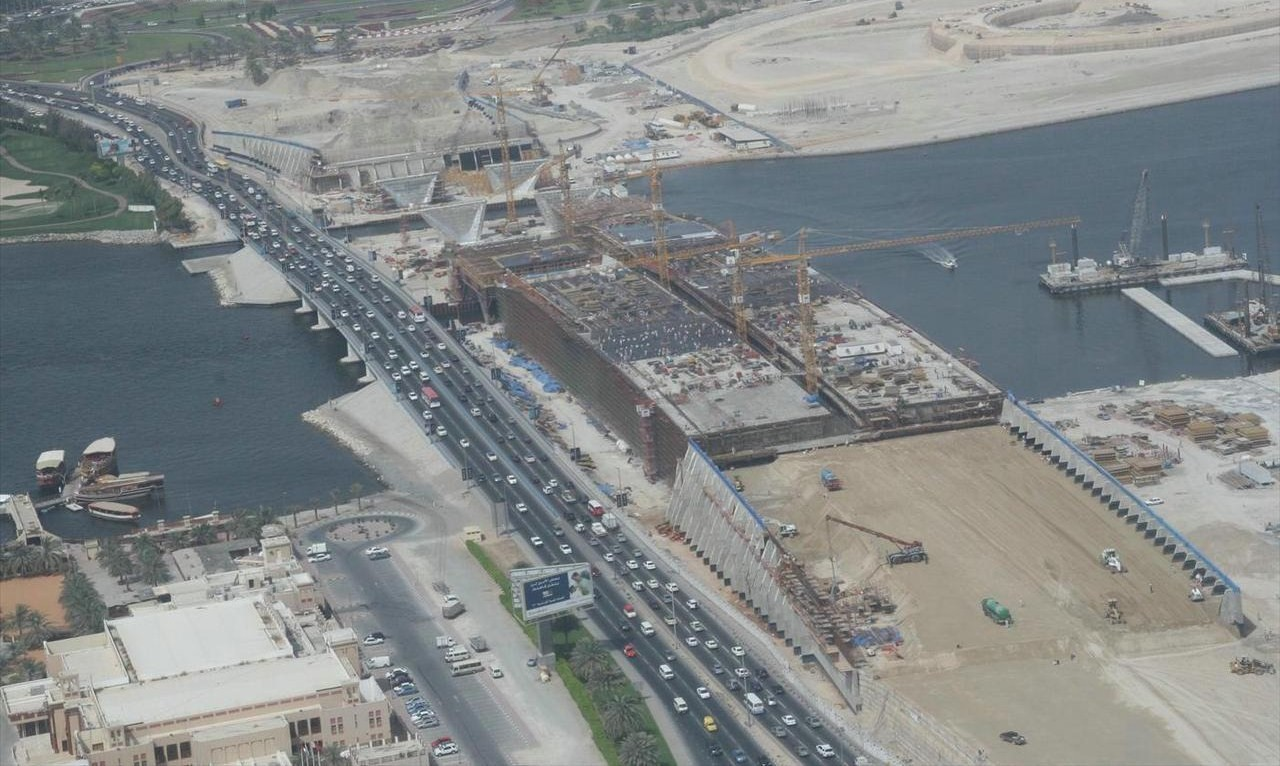
New bridge under construction by BESIX (progress photo taken on 1 May 2007)

To solve the major traffic problems caused by the old bridge, a replacement was constructed between 2006 and 2008 by Belgian main contractor BESIX. The bridge, which cost 415 million dirhams, is meant to add more lanes of road that cross Dubai Creek. The new Al Garhoud Bridge has a total of 14 lanes, 7 in each direction. It is able to handle 16,000 vehicles per hour. Construction of the bridge began in February 2006 and by 26 September 2007, 76% of the construction was completed. The bridge is 520 m (1,706 ft) long and 16 m (52.5 ft) above the water. On 15 December 2007, four lanes on the Deira-bound side were opened to vehicle traffic. Then on 15 March 2008, as had been scheduled, remaining lanes on both sides were opened. The old bridge was demolished after the new bridge opened. Shortly after the bridge opened, the Roads and Transport Authority announced that Al Garhoud Bridge would be decorated with artwork that look like sand dunes during the day and waves at night with the aid of lighting.

Construction Photos on 31 January 2007

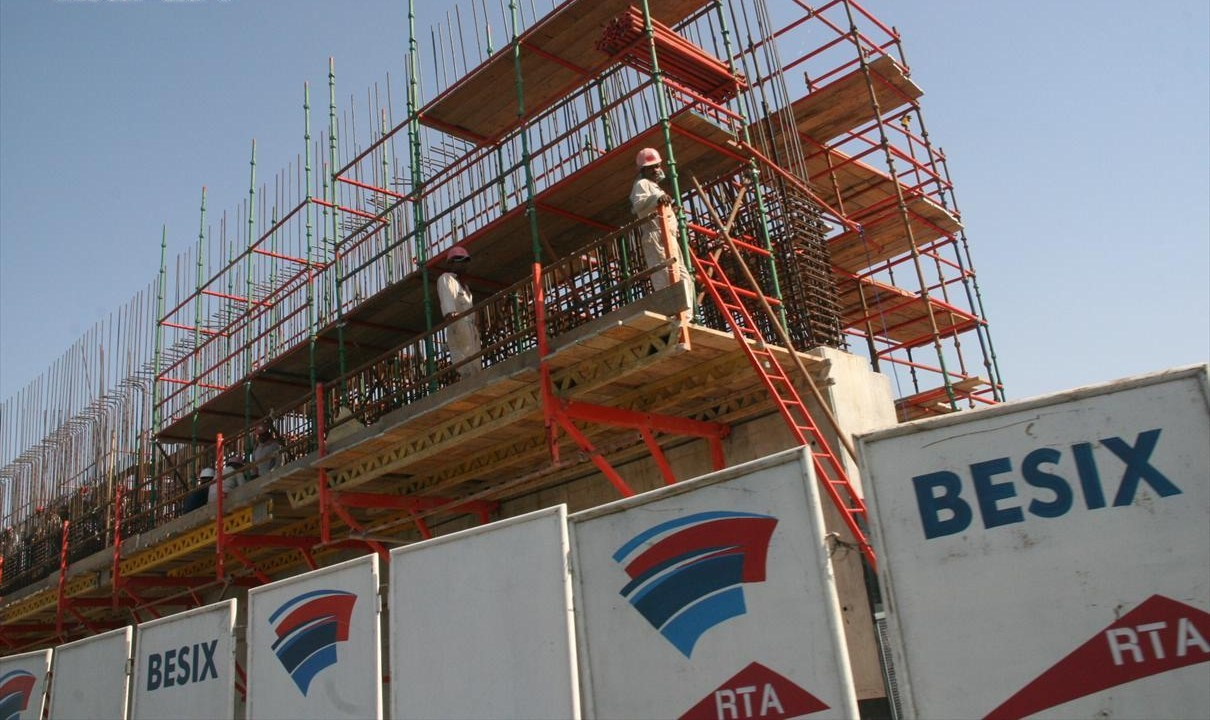

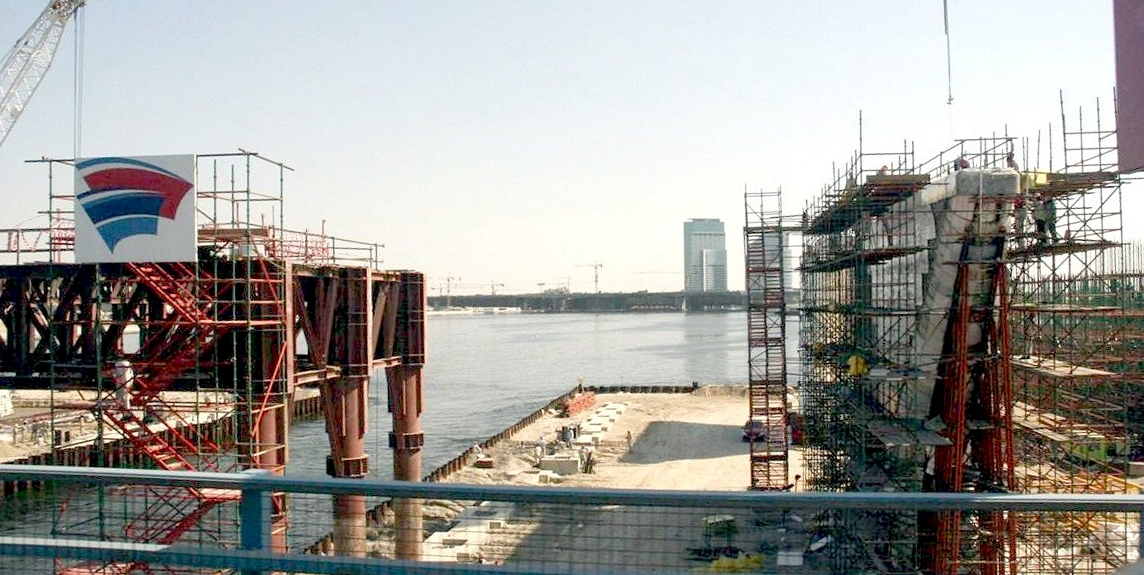

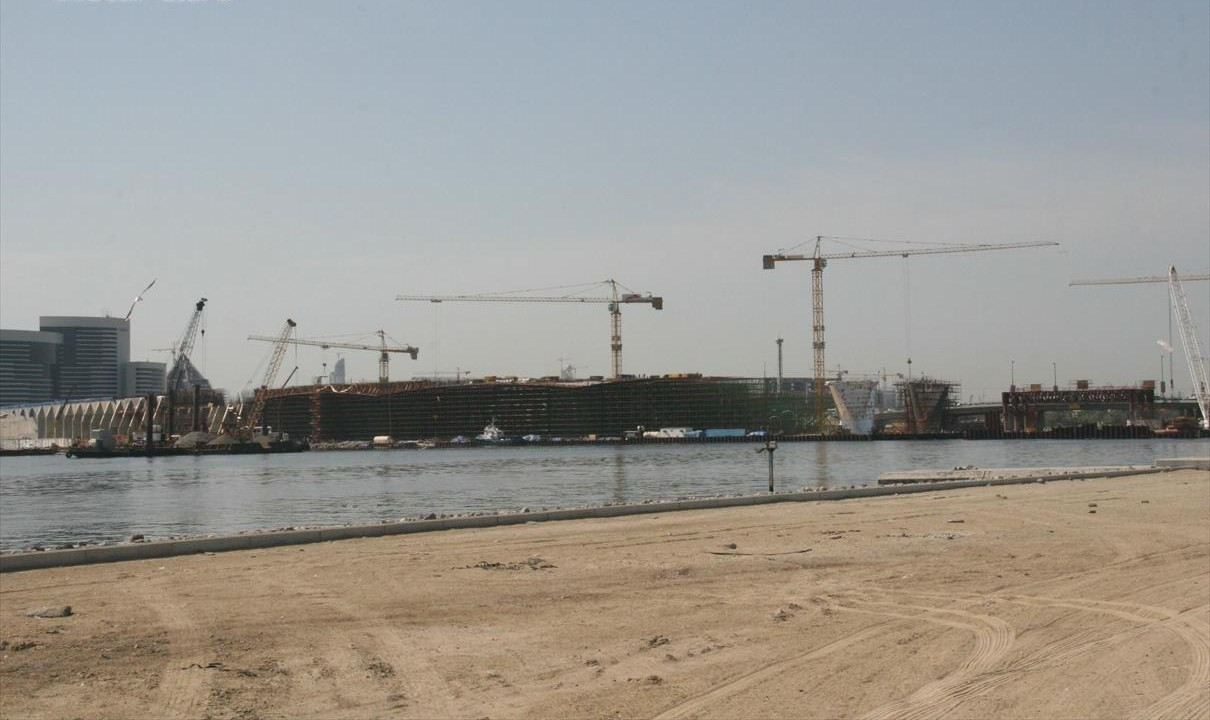

Construction Photos on 1 May 2007

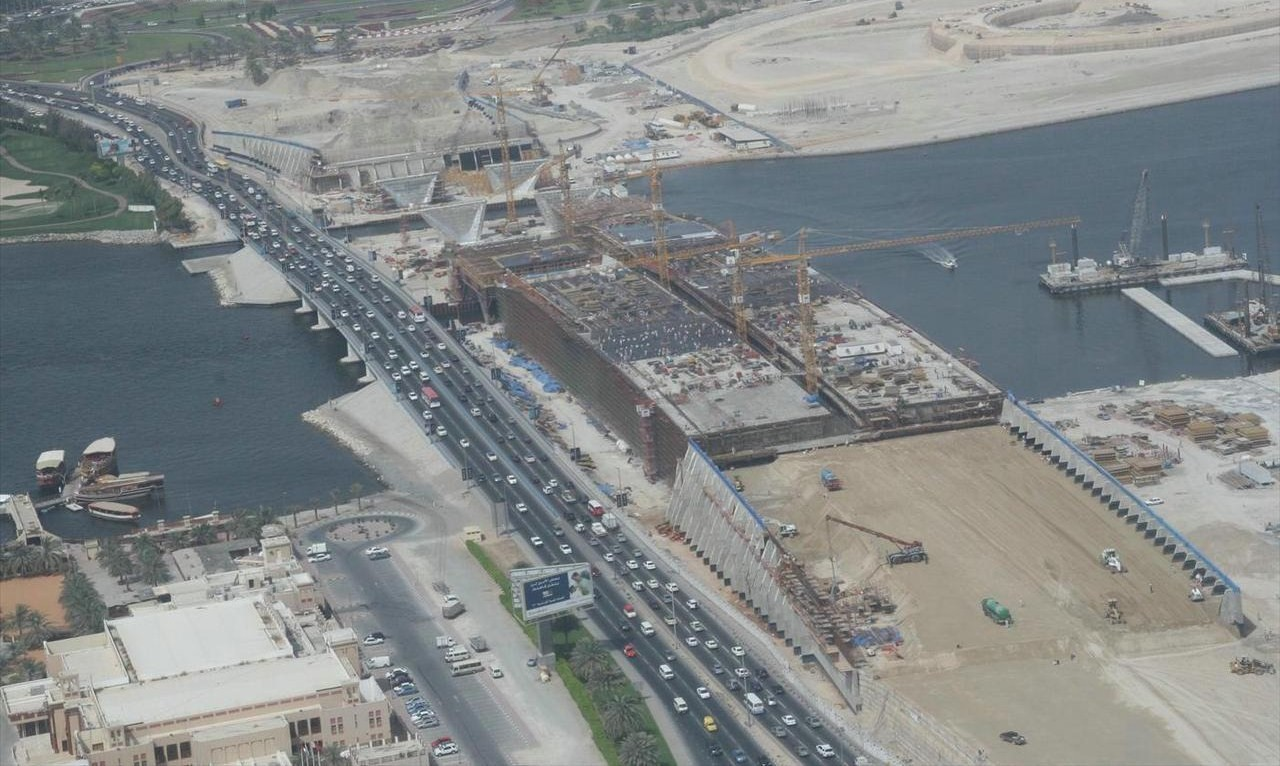

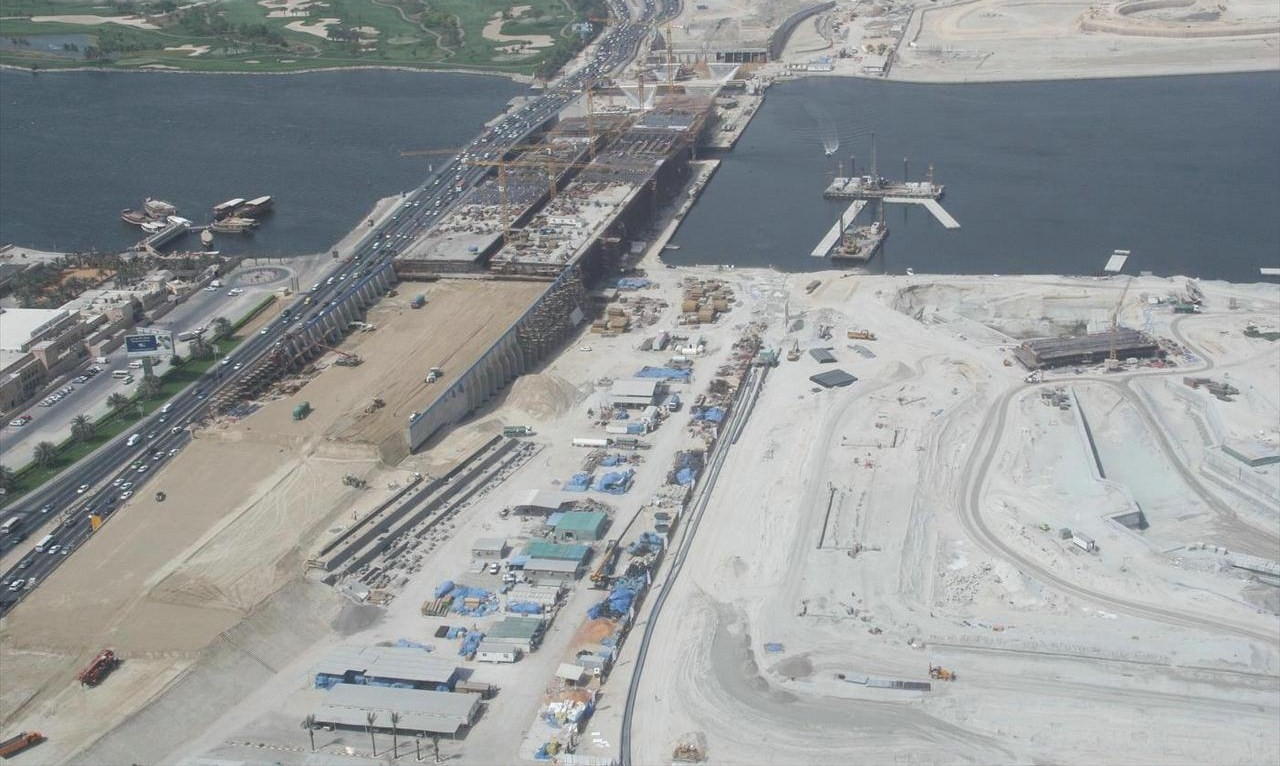

Construction Photo on 31 May 2007

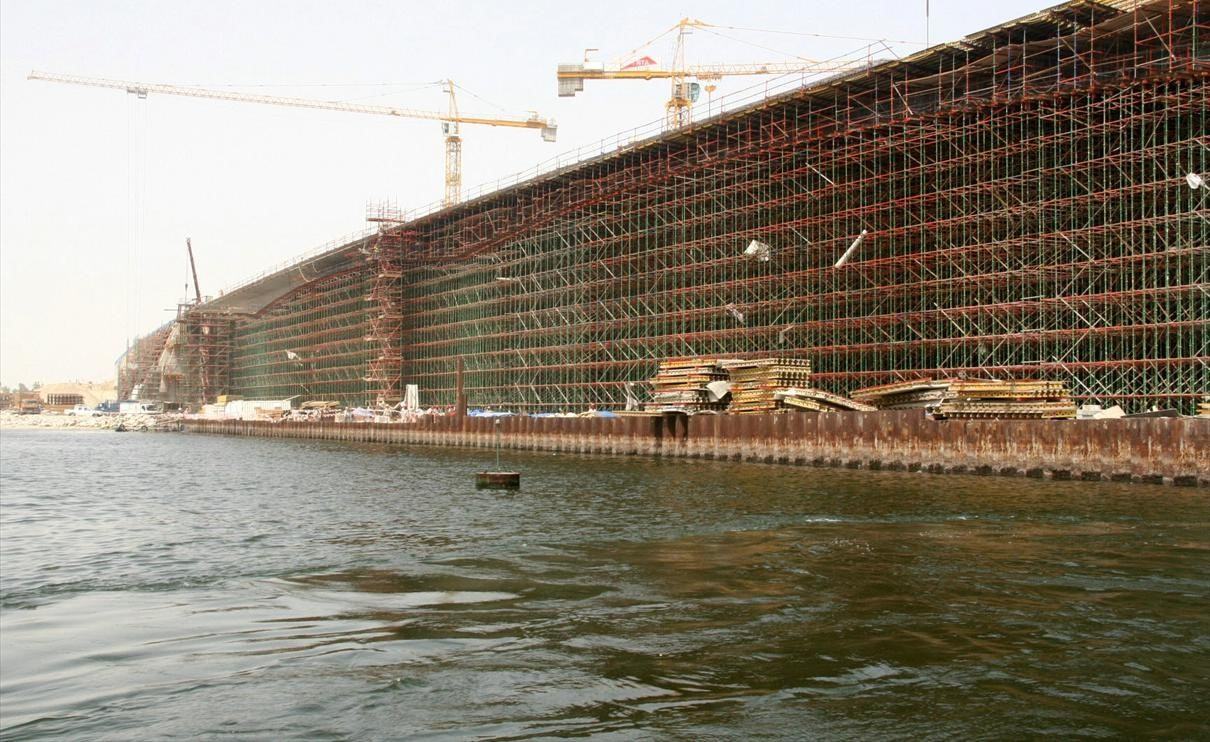

Construction Photo on 18 October 2007

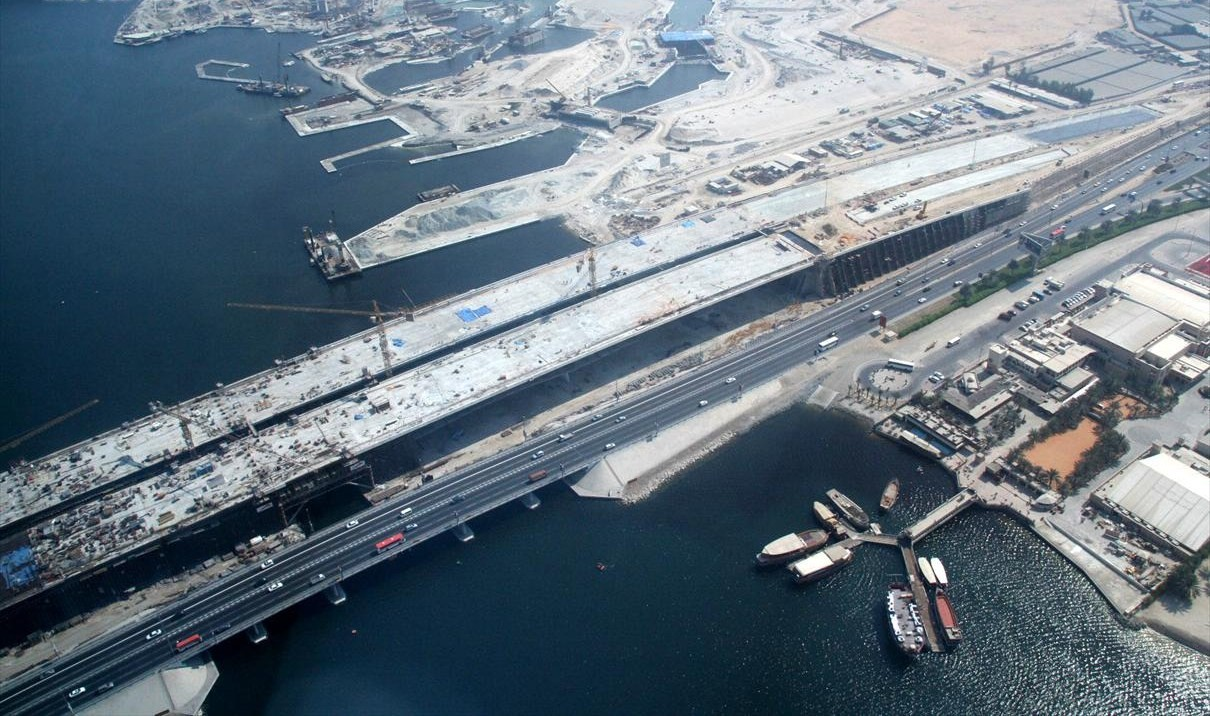

== See also ==
- Al Garhoud
