= Abra (boat) =

Type of boat

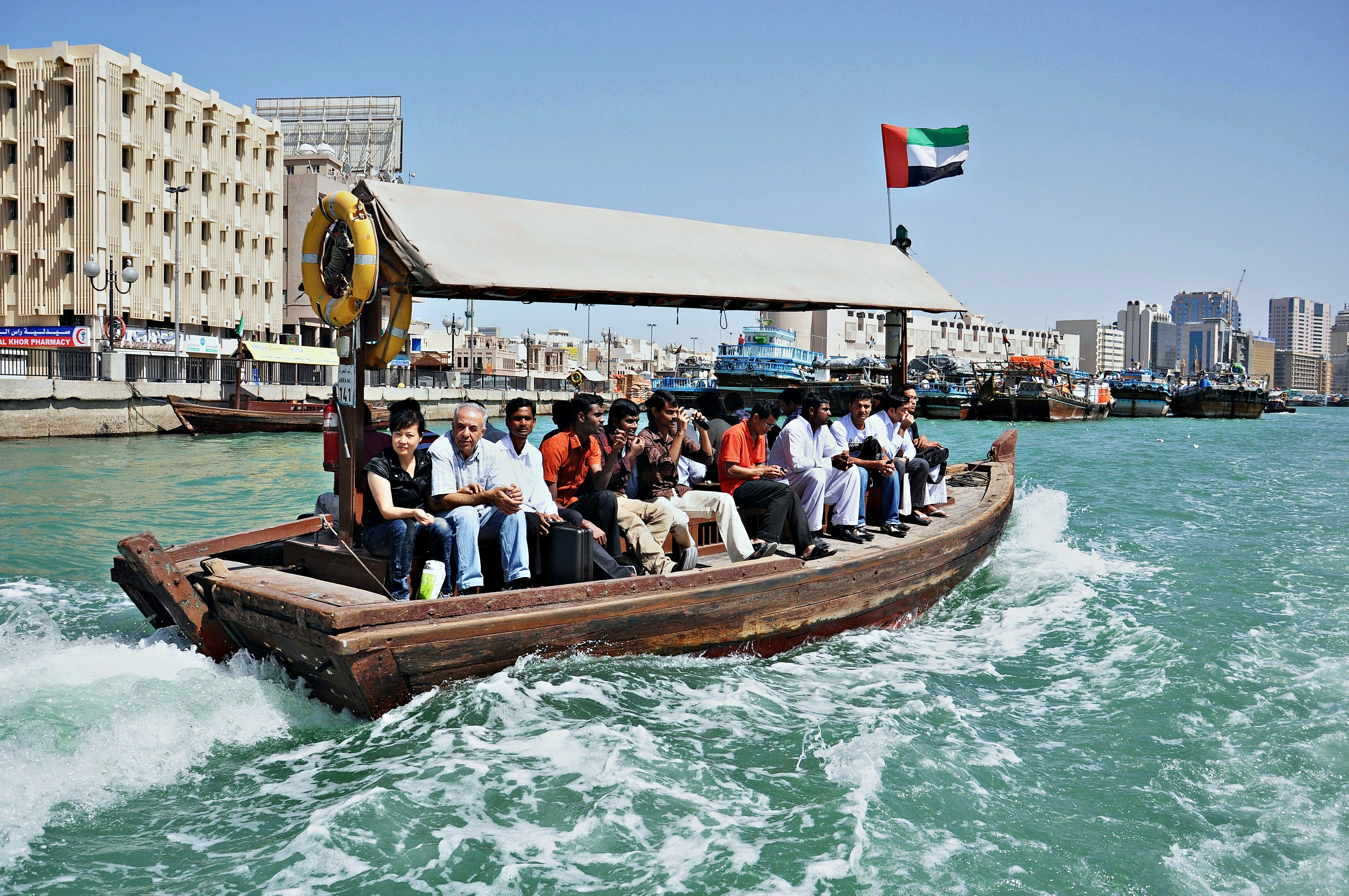
An abra on Dubai Creek

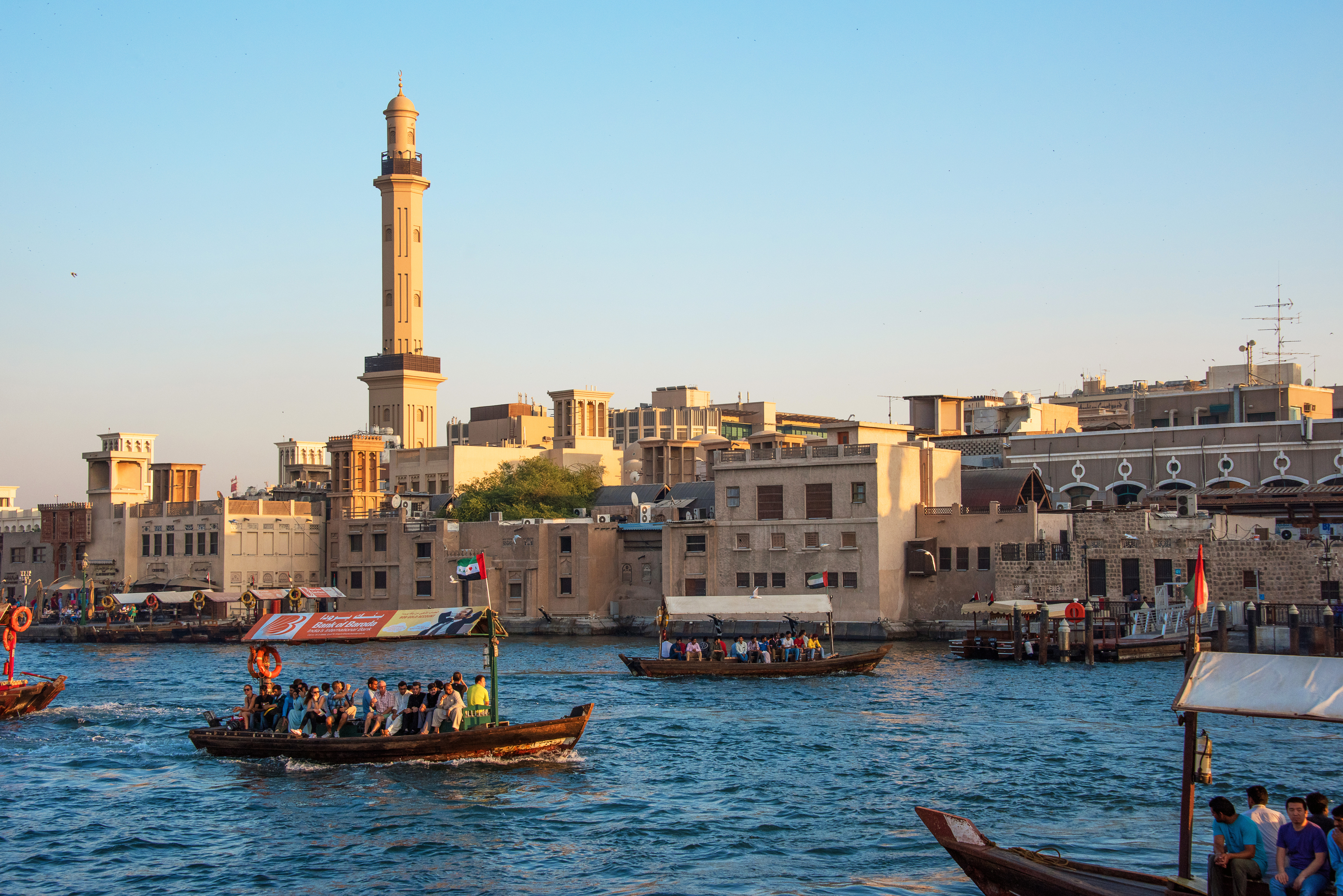
An abra plying the waters on Dubai Creek

An abra (Arabic: عبرة abra) is a traditional boat made of wood.

Abras are used to ferry people across the Dubai Creek in Dubai, United Arab Emirates. They travel between the water station at Shindagha/Al Ghubaiba on the Bur Dubai side, and the water station at Al Sabkha on the Deira side. The abras depart every few minutes. The fare is 1 dirham, which is paid to the ferry driver.

== History ==
Abras were the oldest form of public transport in Dubai. They enabled the movement of men and materials between the two shores of the creek, called Deira and Bur Dubai. These are still used as water taxis run by the government of Dubai. They are also a popular tourist attraction.

3D printed abras came into operation in July 2024.

== See also ==
- Water taxi
