= Dubai Creek =

Tidal creek in Dubai, United Arab Emirates

Dubai Creek خُوْر دُبَيّ
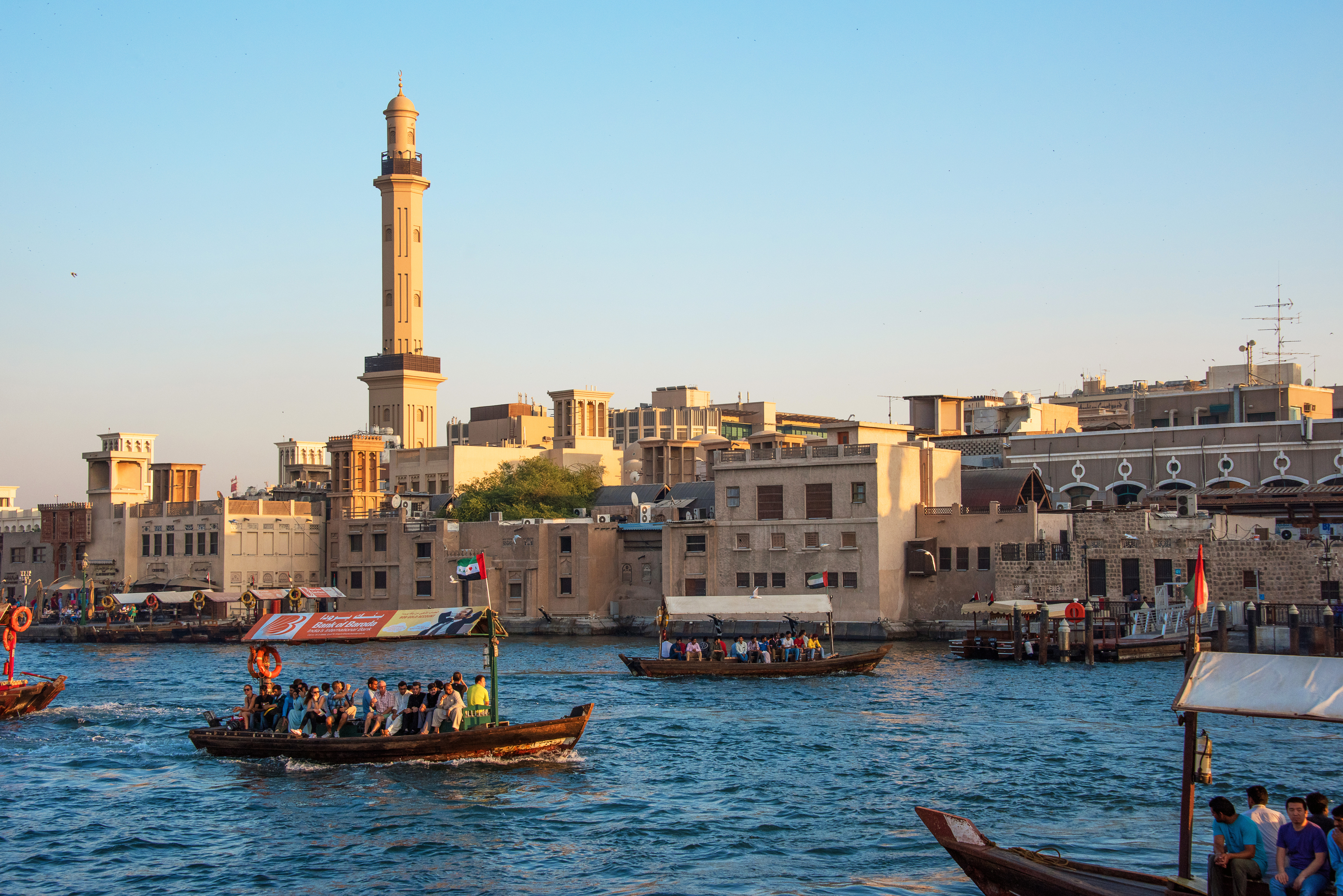
- Abras on the creek

Details
- Location: Dubai, United Arab Emirates
- Length: Total 24 kilometres (15 mi) of which natural length is 14 kilometres (8.7 mi)
- North end: Al Shindagha
- South end: Beach of Jumeirah

Dubai Creek (Arabic: خُوْر دُبَيّ, romanized: Khūr Dubayy) is a natural saltwater inlet of the Persian Gulf in Dubai. It extends about 9 miles (14 km) inwards and forms a natural port that has traditionally been used for trade and transport. The creek ranges from 200 to 1,200 metres (660 to 3,940 ft) in width while the average depth is about 6.5 to 7 metres (21 to 23 ft). Previously, it extended to Ras Al Khor Wildlife Sanctuary but as part of the new Business Bay Canal and Dubai Canal, it extends a further 13 km (8.1 mi) to the Persian Gulf.

In the 1950s, extensive development of the creek began, including dredging and construction of breakwaters. A number of bridges allow movement of vehicles across the creek while abras are used as taxis. The banks and route alongside the creek houses notable government, business and residential areas. A number of tourist locations and hotels are situated along the creek. The Dubai Creek, a vital waterway in the heart of the city, plays a significant role in Dubai's growth by handling the passage of more than 13,000 ships annually. As a major artery for maritime trade, it supports the city's commercial operations. Enhancements to the Creek's infrastructure are being made through a project aimed at improving safety and security measures for maritime traffic and commercial activities. These improvements are expected to strengthen the city's role as a regional hub for trade and ensure smoother, more secure operations for the numerous ships passing through each year.

== History ==
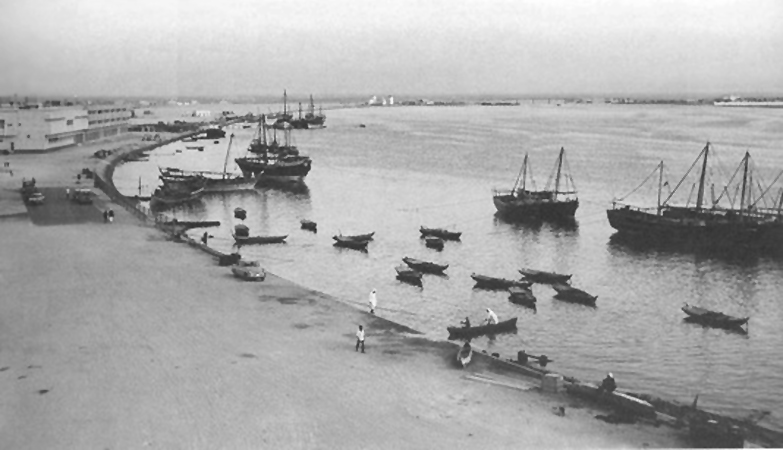
The creek in 1964

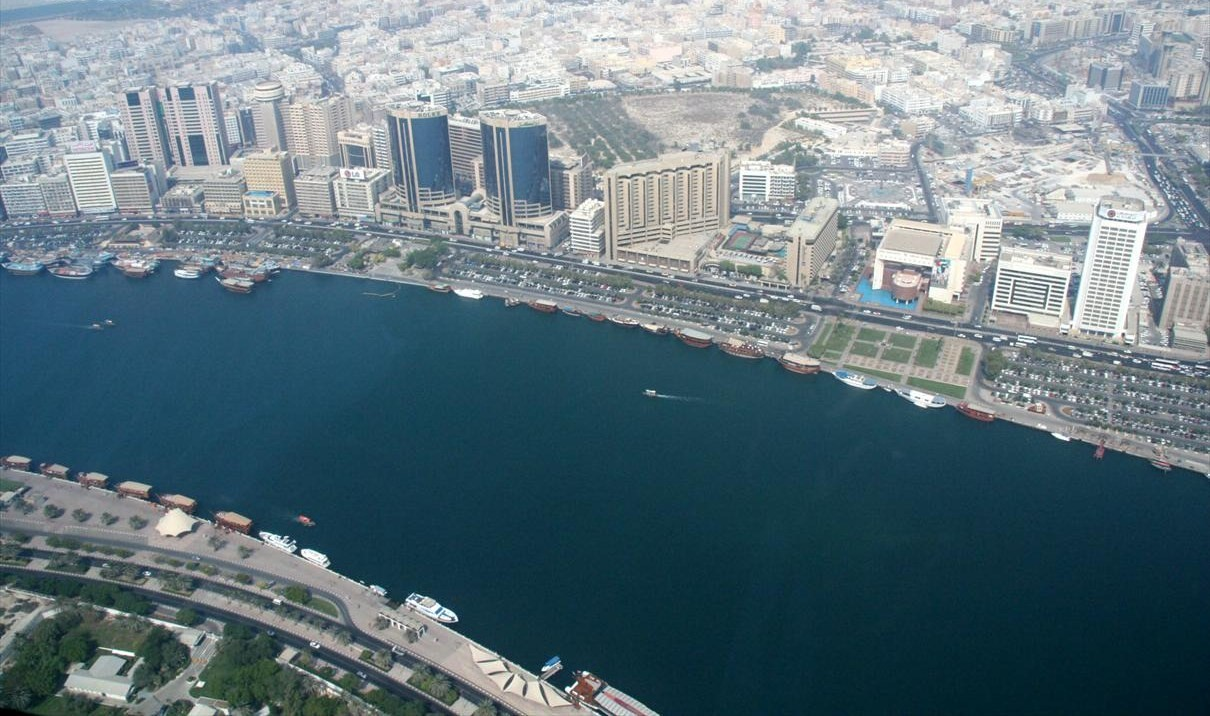
The creek in 2007

Historically, the creek divided the city into two main sections – Deira and Bur Dubai. It was along the Bur Dubai creek area that members of the Bani Yas tribe first settled in the 19th century, establishing the Al Maktoum dynasty in the city. In the early 20th century, the creek, though incapable then of supporting large scale transportation, served as a minor port for dhows coming from as far away as India or East Africa. Although it impeded the entry of ships due to current flow, the creek remained an important element in establishing the commercial position of Dubai, being the only port or harbour in the city. Dubai's pearling industry, which formed the main sector of the city's economy, was based primarily on expeditions in the creek, prior to the invention of cultured pearls in the 1930s. Fishing, also an important industry at the time, was also based along the creek, whose warm and shallow waters supported a wide variety of marine life. Dhows used for purposes of fishing were also built on the foreshore of the creek.

The importance of the creek as a site of commercial activity was a justification to introduce improvements to allow larger vessels to transit, as well as to facilitate loading and unloading activities. This led, in 1955, to a plan to develop the creek, which involved dredging shallow areas, building of breakwaters, and developing its beach to become a quay suitable for loading and unloading of cargo. The creek was first dredged in 1961 to permit 7-foot (2.1 m) draft vessels to cross through the creek at all times. The creek was dredged again in the 1960s and 1970s so that it could offer anchorage for local and coastal shipping of up to about 500 tons. The dredging opened up the creek to much more continuous traffic of merchandise, including the development of re-export, and gave Dubai an advantage over Sharjah, the other dominant trading centre in the region at the time.

Al Maktoum Bridge, the first bridge connecting Bur Dubai and Deira was constructed in 1963. Although the importance of the creek as a port has diminished with the development of the Jebel Ali Port, smaller facilities, such as Port Saeed, continue to exist along the creek, providing porting to traders from the region and the subcontinent.

=== 21st century ===
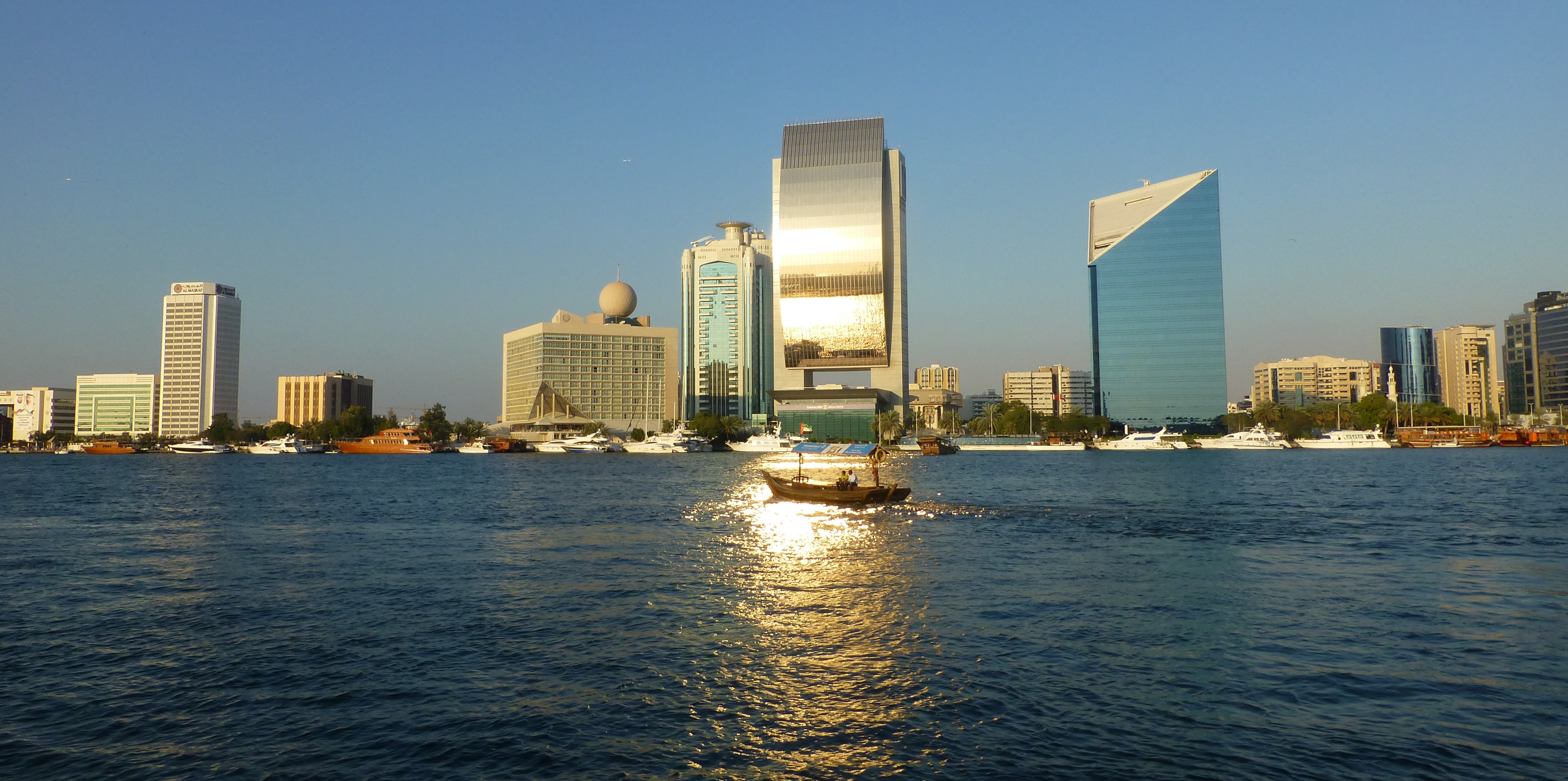
NBD headquarters along the Dubai Creek

In September 2007, a Dhs. 484 million (US$ 132 million) extension of the creek was finished, which now ends just south of the Metropolitan Hotel and projects on Shaikh Zayed Road. A final 2.2-kilometre extension, called the Dubai Water Canal was inaugurated 9 November 2016, crossing Shaikh Zayed Road in a northerly route, passing through Safa Park and then through Jumeirah 2. The channel is expected to continue through Jumeirah Beach Park where it will reach the shores of the Persian Gulf. The extension is part of the Dubai's Business Bay development. Additionally, a new project consisting of seven islands known as Dubai Creek Harbour was proposed to be built on Dubai Creek. The centerpiece of this project would be the Dubai Creek Tower, which is set to become the tallest building in the world. Three additional bridges are being planned for Dubai Creek, which are the Seventh Crossing, the Al Shindagha Bridge, and the Fifth Bridge.

The Dubai Festival City Mall on Dubai Creek opened in 2007. Mohammed Bin Rashid Library is being built in the Al Jaddaf area on the Creek. Dhows are constructed in this area too on the bankside. The Green Line of the Dubai Metro terminates at the Dubai Creek metro station. Close to this metro station is the Al Jaddaf Marine Station, operating ferries on the Creek, including across the Creek to the Dubai Festival City Mall.

== Route ==
=== Original ===
The creek's initial inlet into mainland Dubai is along the areas of Deira Corniche and Al Ras in eastern Dubai and along the area of Al Shindagha in western Dubai. It then progresses south-eastward through the mainland, passing through Port Saeed and Dubai Creek Park. The creek's natural ending is at the Ras Al Khor Wildlife Sanctuary, 14 kilometres (8.7 mi) from its origin at the Persian Gulf. The traditional form of transport between the eastern and western sections of Dubai via the creek was through abras, which continue to operate in Dubai. In addition, the eastern and western sections are linked via four bridges (Al Maktoum Bridge, Al Garhoud Bridge, Business Bay Crossing, and Floating Bridge) and one tunnel (Al Shindagha Tunnel).

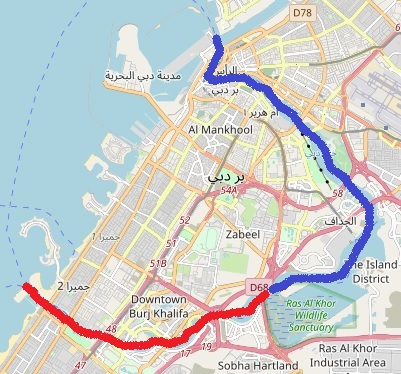
Original route of Dubai Creek is highlighted in blue. The new extension is highlighted in red.

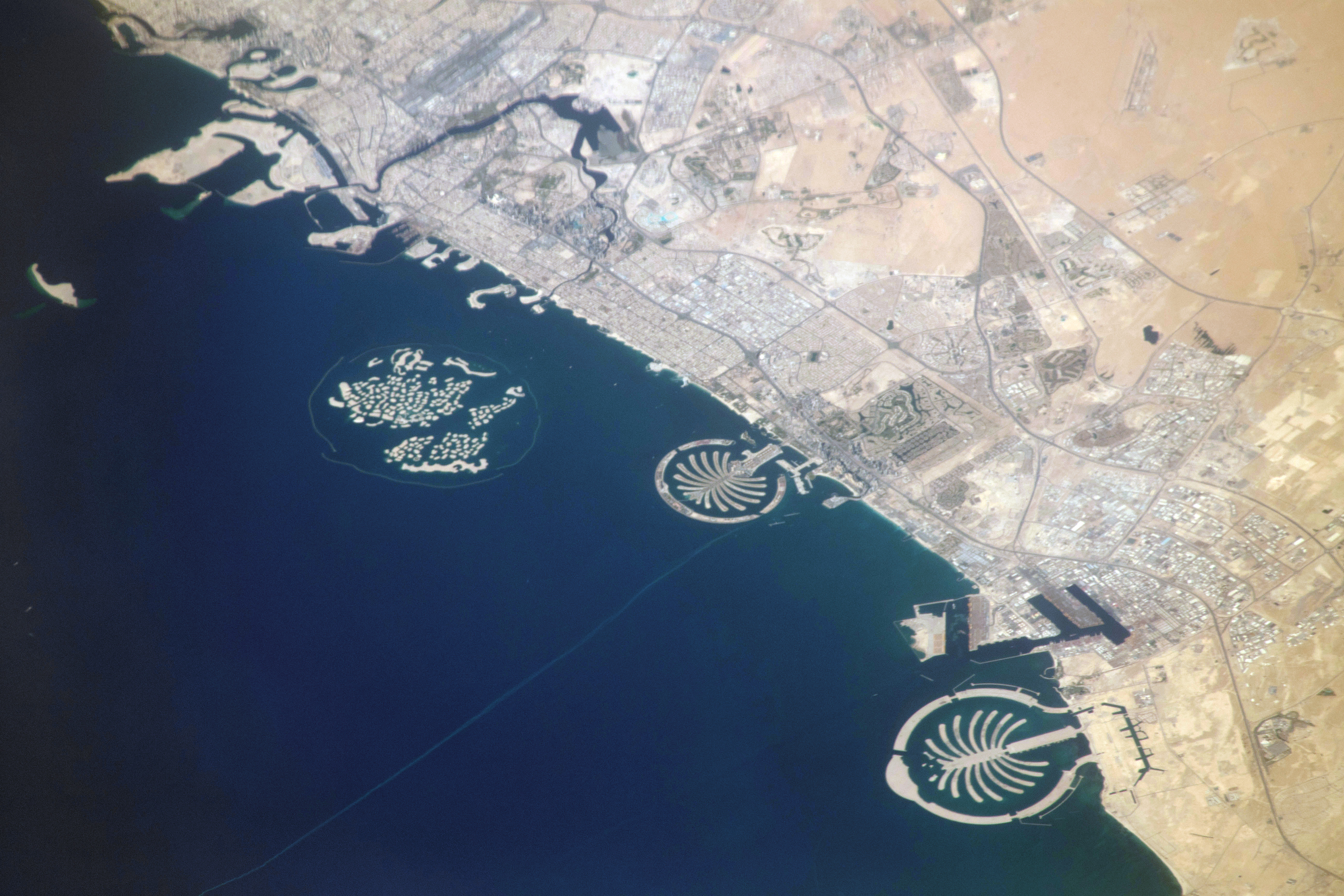
Coast of Dubai from the International Space Station. Dubai Creek is visible.

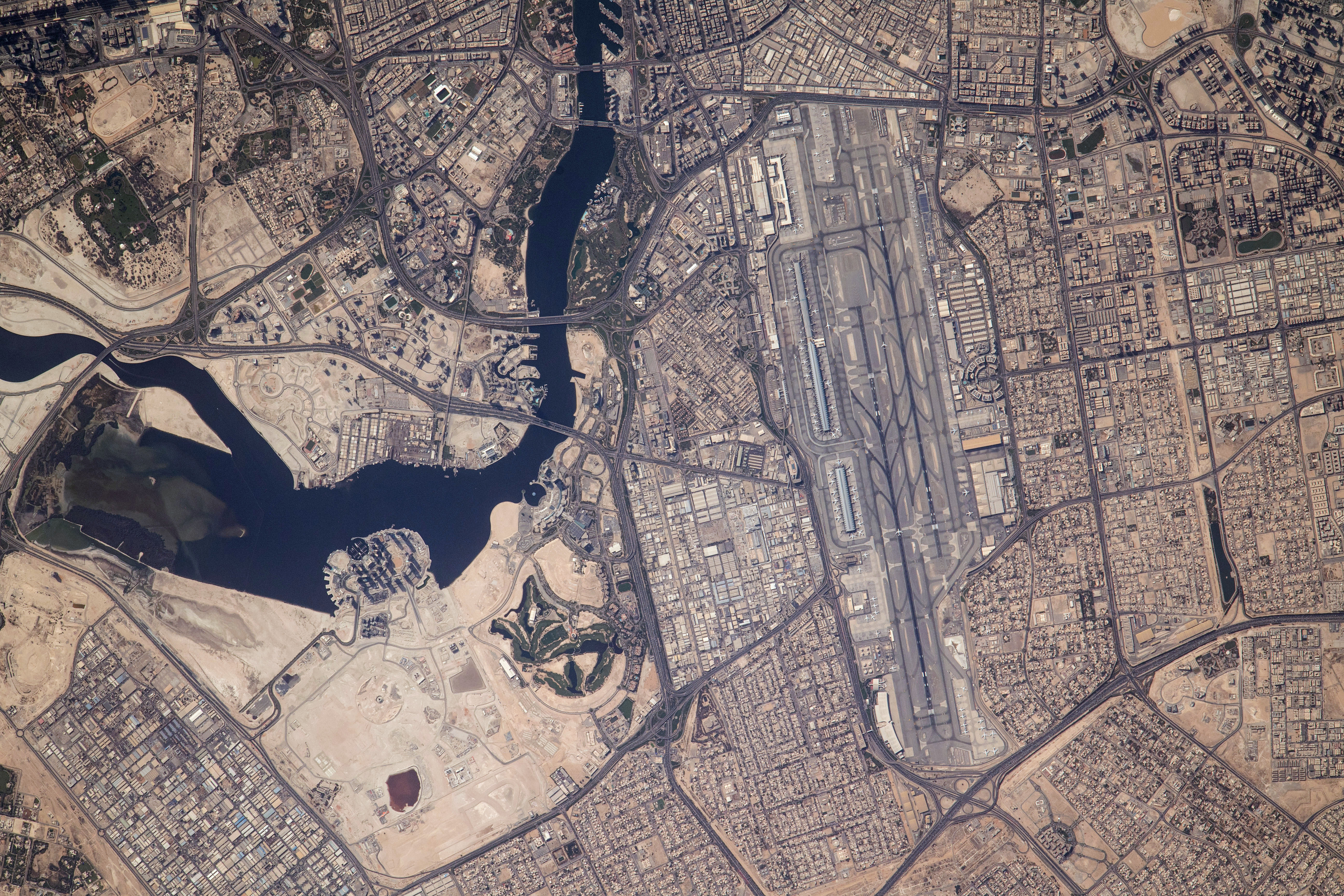
Dubai International Airport and Dubai Creek figure prominently in this photograph from the International Space Station.

=== Extensions ===
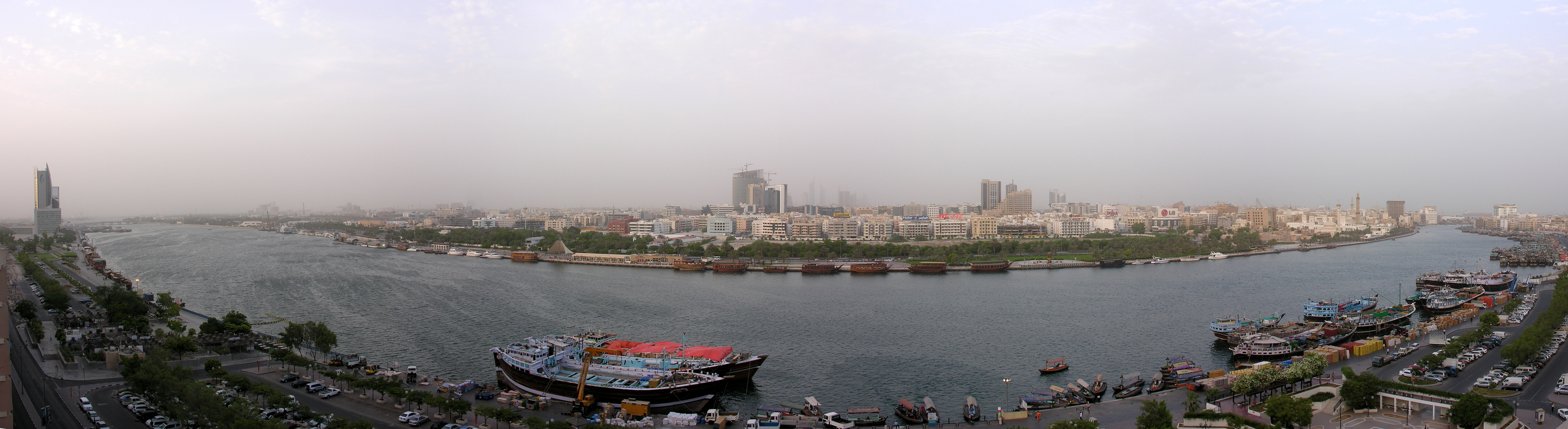
Image of part of the creek extension captured from near the south end (at 25.267236°N 55.306675°E)

The creek has been extended by 13 km (8.1 mi) through Business Bay, Dubai Canal and through Jumeirah into the Persian Gulf.

== Landmarks ==
Buildings and structures along Dubai creek. Hover and click on the map and then on the points for details.

Notable buildings alongside the Deira side of the Creek are the Deira Twin Towers, the old Dubai Creek Tower, Sheraton Dubai Creek, National Bank of Dubai, and Chamber of Commerce. On the other side of Al Maktoum Bridge along Dubai Creek is Dubai Creek Park, one of the largest parks in Dubai.

The creek is also home to the Dubai Creek Golf & Yacht Club, comprising an 18-hole tournament golf course, clubhouses, residential development, and the Park Hyatt hotel.

== Crossings ==
Present crossings, in order from northwest to southeast

- Al Shindagha Tunnel
- Al Maktoum Bridge
- Floating Bridge (temporary; to be replaced by the "Dubai Smile" in the future)
- Al Garhoud Bridge
- Business Bay Crossing
- Infinity Bridge

Future/planned crossings

- Dubai Smile (to replace the Floating Bridge)
- Sheikh Rashid bin Saeed Crossing (to link Al Jaddaf and Bur Dubai)

== Ports and marinas ==
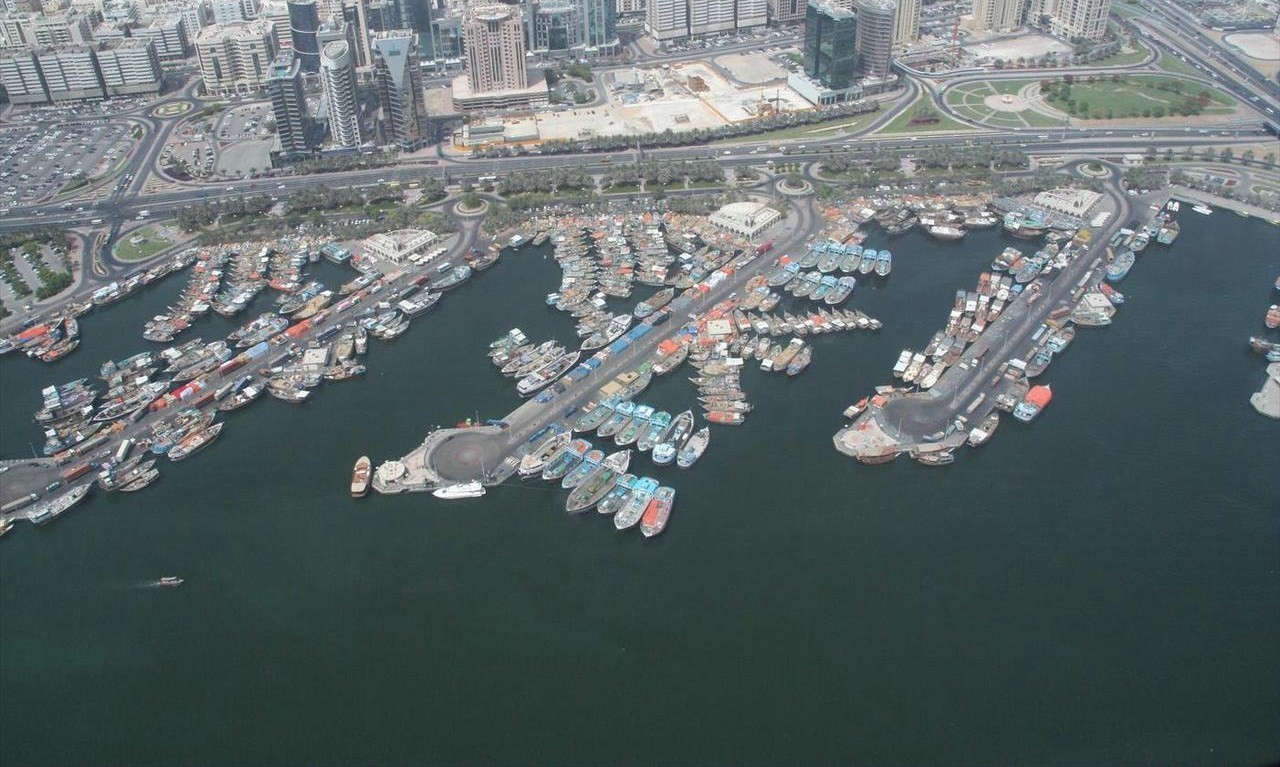
Port Saeed

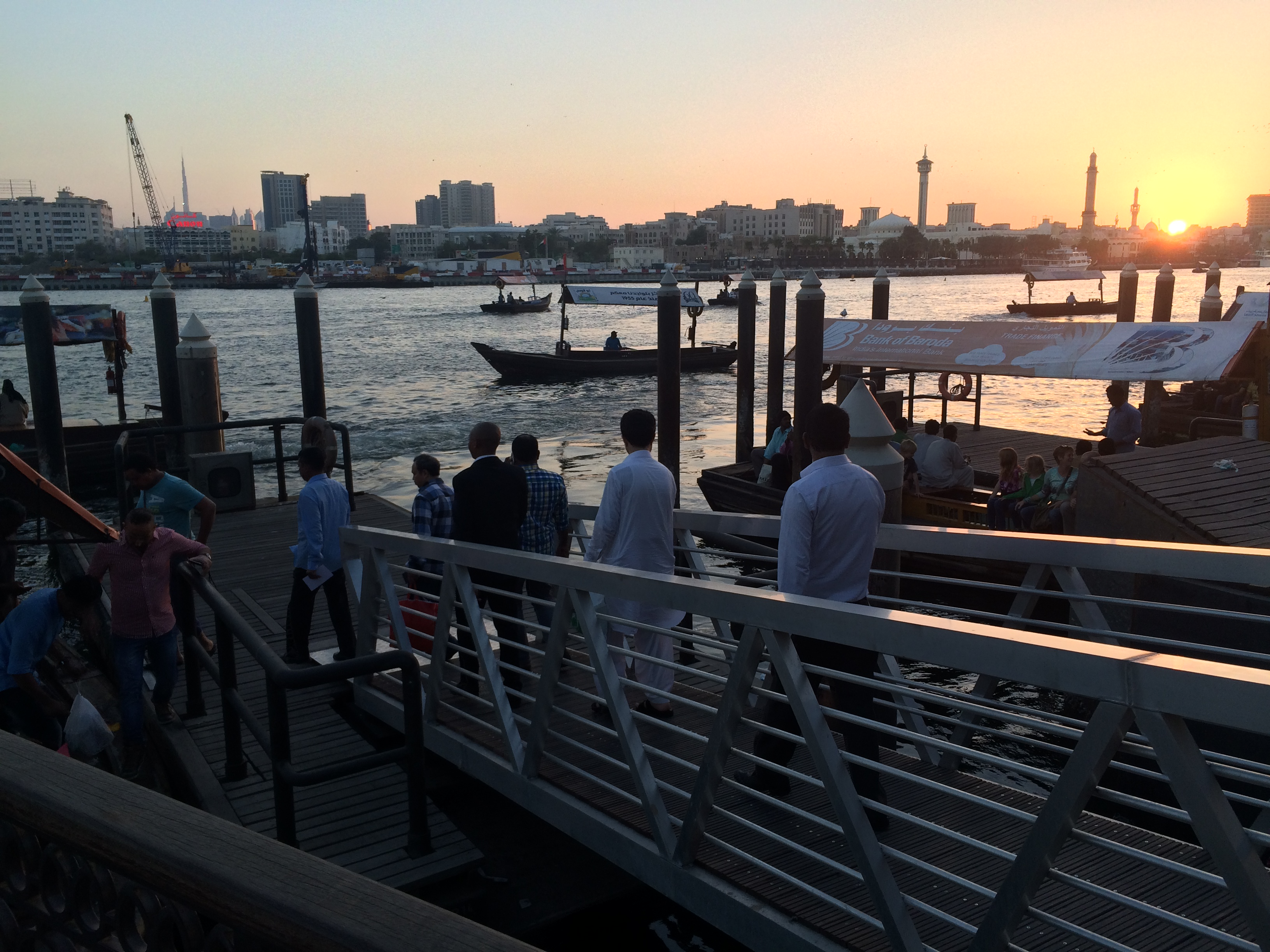
Abra station in Deira

- Port Saeed
- Dubai Creek Harbour
- Al Jaddaf Marine Station
- Business Bay Marina
