= Bur Dubai =

Bur Dubai بُر دُبَيّ
- Community
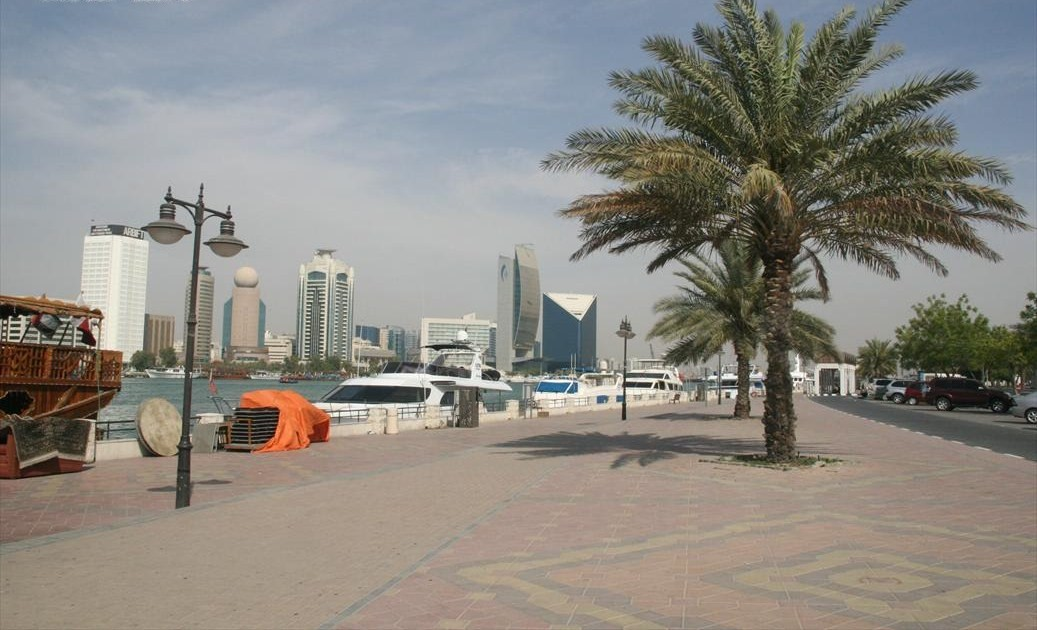
- The area of Dubai Creek facing Deira

- Location of Bur Dubai in the UAE Bur Dubai (United Arab Emirates) Bur Dubai (Persian Gulf) Bur Dubai (Middle East) Bur Dubai (West and Central Asia)
- Coordinates: 25°15′43″N 55°17′49″E
- Country: United Arab Emirates
- Emirate: Dubai
- City: Dubai

Bur Dubai (Arabic: بُر دُبَيّ, romanized: Bur Dubayy, lit. 'Dubai land') is a historic district in Dubai, located on the western side of the Dubai Creek. The name is a reference to the traditional separation of the area from Deira by the creek.

== Description ==
The Ruler's Court is located in the district adjacent to the Grand Mosque. The district is home to several mosques including the Grand Mosque of Dubai with the city's tallest minaret, and the blue tiled Iranian Mosque. Most Indian expatriate families live in Bur Dubai, due to the proximity of a Hindu temple that was established in the 1960s. It is home to several popular places for tourists including renovated historic buildings and museums. The district has many shopping streets and souqs, including the Textile Souq near the abra boat station, though most of the well-known souqs are located in Deira. Bur Dubai has many shops and restaurants, particularly Indian restaurants.

The historical area of Al Bastakiya is located to the east of Al Fahidi Fort (now home to Dubai Museum) and features old courtyard housing which are identifiable with their wind towers. Shindagha to the northwest, located between Bur Dubai, the creek, and the sea is the historic location of the ruler's house on the peninsula facing the sea and the creek.

=== Modern developments ===
Between 2013 and 2016, the creek was extended back to the sea from Business Bay to Jumeirah, forming the Dubai Water Canal and turning Bur Dubai into an island. Bur Dubai is a popular living area consisting of several apartment buildings. As per Dubai Roads and Transport Authority, (RTA) has signed an agreement with real estate developer Nakheel to construct a new bridge which will connect from Bur Dubai to Dubai Islands by 2026.
