= Deira, Dubai =

Community in Dubai, the United Arab Emirates

Deira دَيْرَة
- Urban District
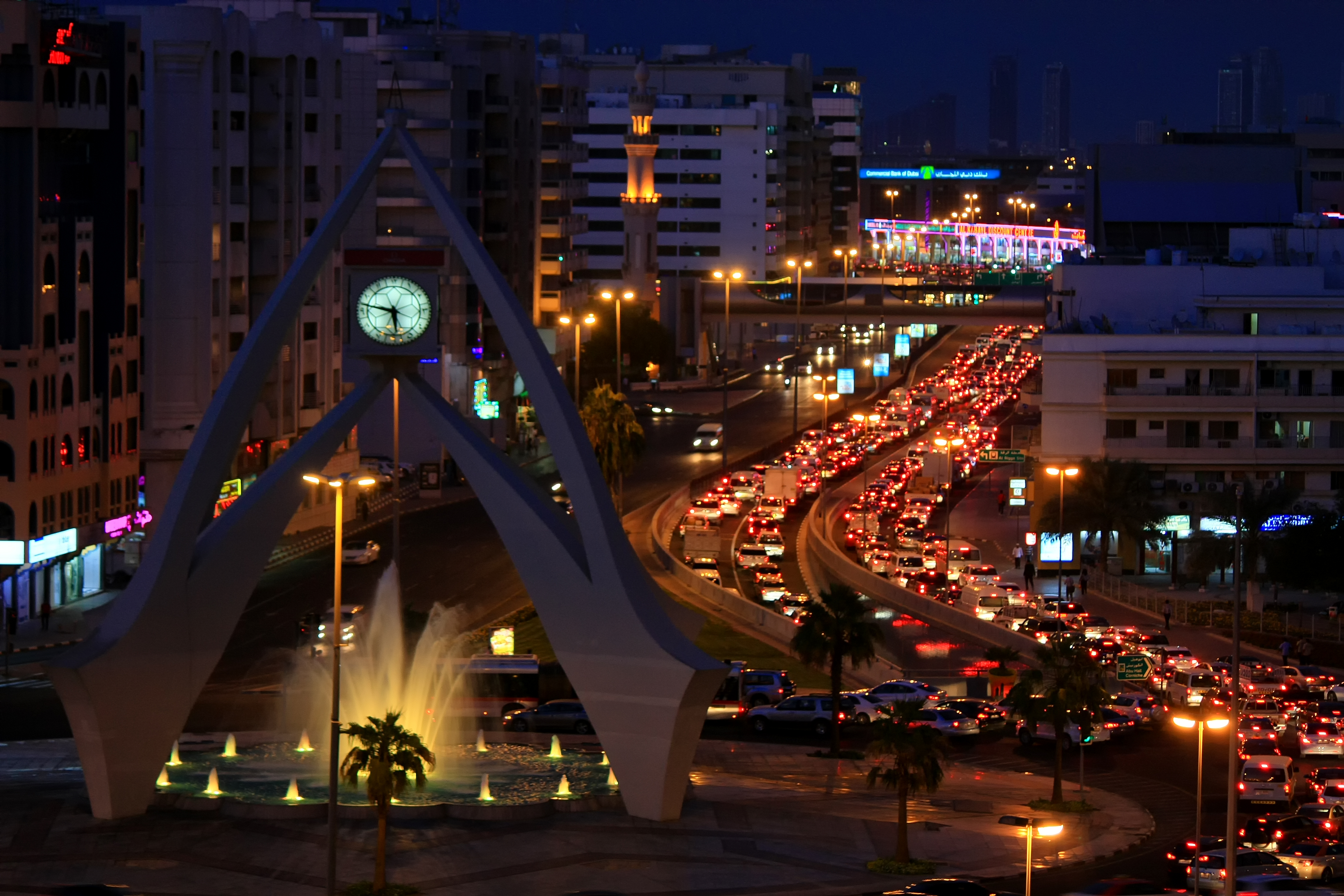
- The Deira Clocktower in 2015

- Location of Al Ras in the UAE Deira (United Arab Emirates) Deira (Persian Gulf) Deira (Middle East) Deira (West and Central Asia)
- Coordinates: 25°16′N 55°19′E
- Country: United Arab Emirates
- Emirate: Dubai
- City: Dubai
- Established: June 9, 1833

Population
  - Total: 400,000

Deira (Arabic: دَيْرَة, romanized: Dayrah) is a historically significant district within the U.A.E. city of Dubai. It is located at the northern end of Dubai Creek.

== History ==
Deira is one of the oldest and most established areas of Dubai. Its origin dates back to the mid-1700s, it developed along the canal called Dubai Creek, this salt-water canal separates Deira from Bur Dubai. The canal enabled the area to develop its importance. It facilitated the sea trade, which is still operational today. With the help of these traditional dhow boats, hundreds of tons of goods are still loaded and unloaded on the canal docks every day.

In 1841, a smallpox epidemic broke out in the district of Bur Dubai, forcing residents to relocate east to Deira.

In 1896, a fire broke out alongside Dubai Creek, a disastrous occurrence in a town where many family homes were still constructed from barasti – palm fronds. The conflagration consumed half the houses of Bur Dubai, while the district of Deira was said to have been totally destroyed.

In the following years, more fires broke out and in 1908 the "great storm" struck the pearling boats of Dubai and the coastal emirates towards the end of the pearling season that year, resulting in the loss of a dozen boats and over 100 men. The disaster was a major setback for Dubai, with many families losing their breadwinners and merchants facing financial ruin.

These losses came at a time when the tribes of the interior were also experiencing poverty. In a letter to the Sultan of Muscat in 1911, Sheikh Butti bin Suhail Al Maktoum, the ruler of Dubai at the time, laments, "Misery and poverty are raging among them, with the result that they are struggling, looting and killing among themselves."

Historically it was the most important commercial center of the emirate alongside its twin across the creek, Dubai City (Independent of Deira at the time), It reached its peak during the pearl fishing period before pearls started to be cultivated on a large scale in the early 1930s by the Japanese. The ferrying of people is provided by small boats that constantly go back and forth between the two sides.

Despite its historic importance, it has been losing its significance during the past decades due to recent development and larger focus by the government towards areas along E 11 road (Sheikh Zayed Road) and areas further down the coast towards Abu Dhabi since the Union of the 6 Emirates in 1971.

Deira, alongside Bur Dubai, Karama and Satwa, is part of an area that is locally known as "Old Dubai". It’s because these are some of the most historic quarters of the city and home to countless iconic structures, from centuries-old gold and spice souqs to ancient forts and fortresses.

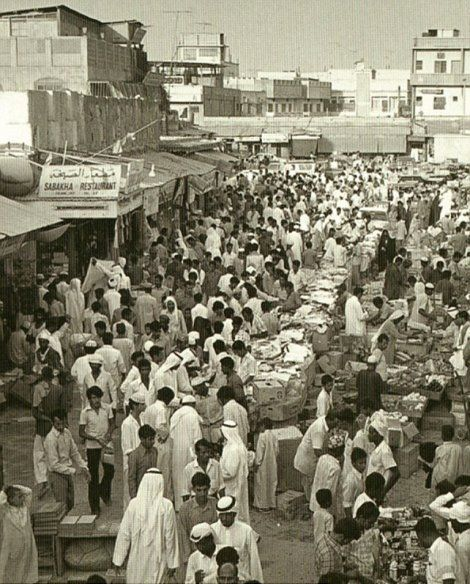
A souq in the 1950s

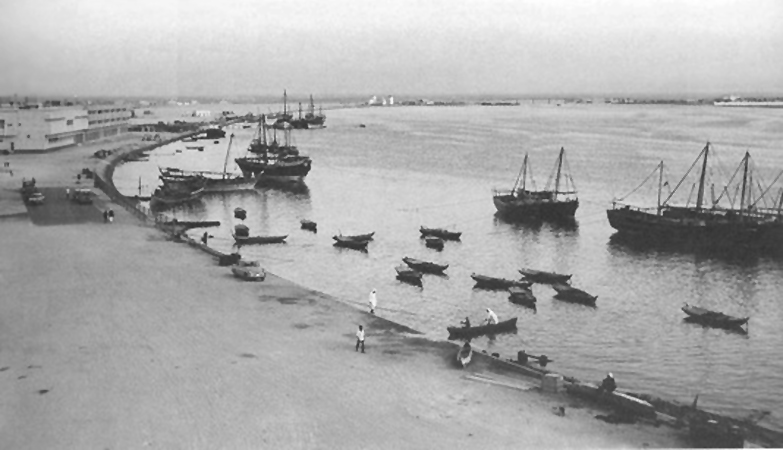
Al-Ras District and Dubai Creek in the mid-1960s

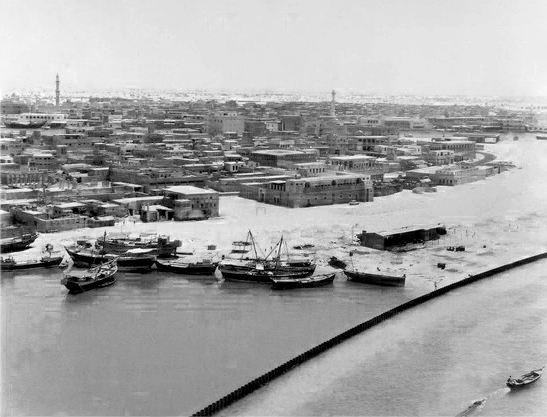

== Population ==
Deira has a population of 400,000 which consists of 10% of Dubai's total population of around 4 million people.

== Economy ==
The district contains 30% of Dubai's trading locations and 10% of its GDP. A large portion of its earnings come from the historic fish, gold, and spice souqs that have been essential to the district for centuries.

City Centre Deira is a flagship shopping mall in central Deira, with the Deira City Centre metro station at its entrance.

The Waterfront Market, retailing fish, vegetables, and meat, opened on the Deira Corniche in 2017. The historic Dubai Gold Souk and the newly developed Dubai Gold District are some of the other prominent destinations in the Deira District.

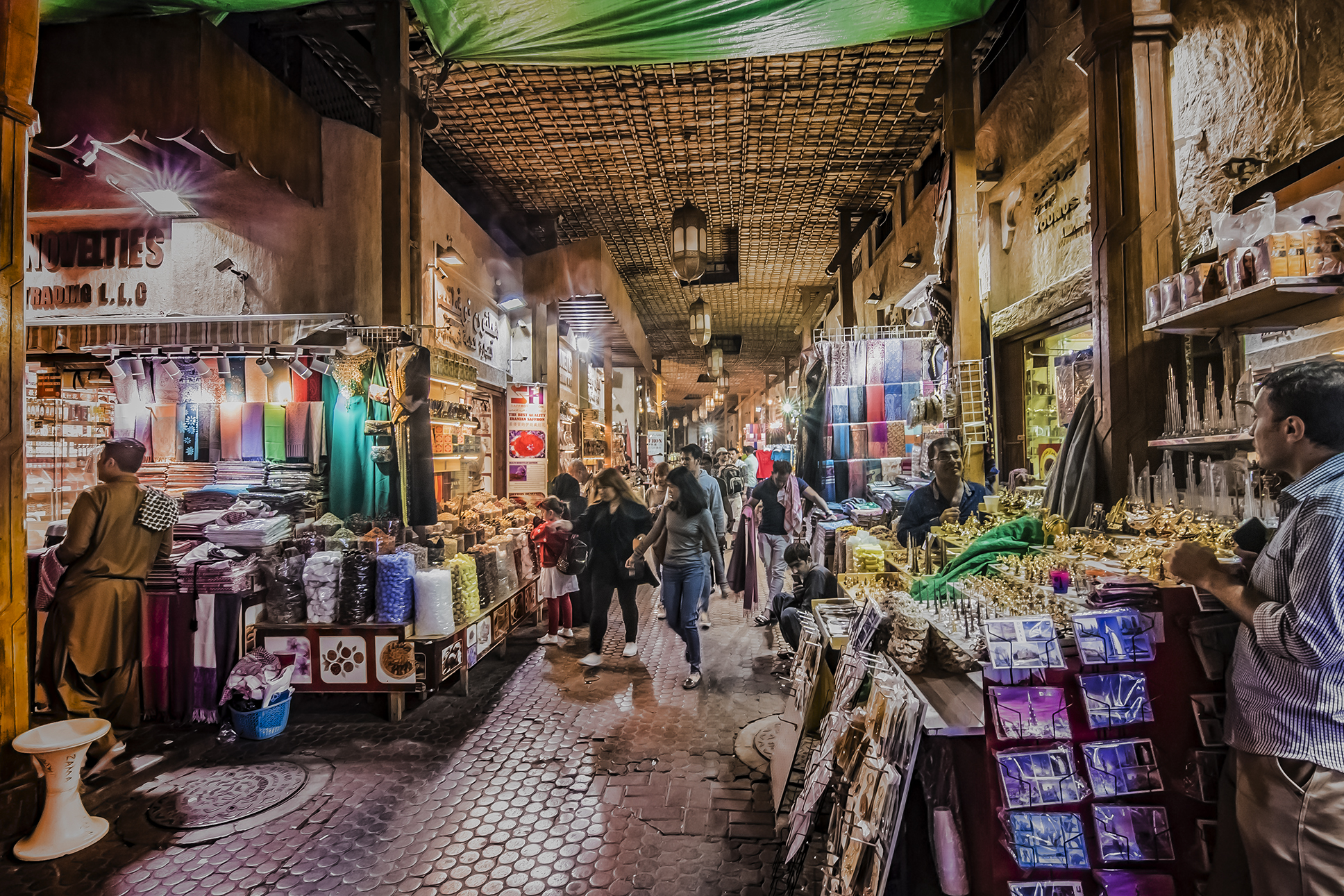
A souq of spices

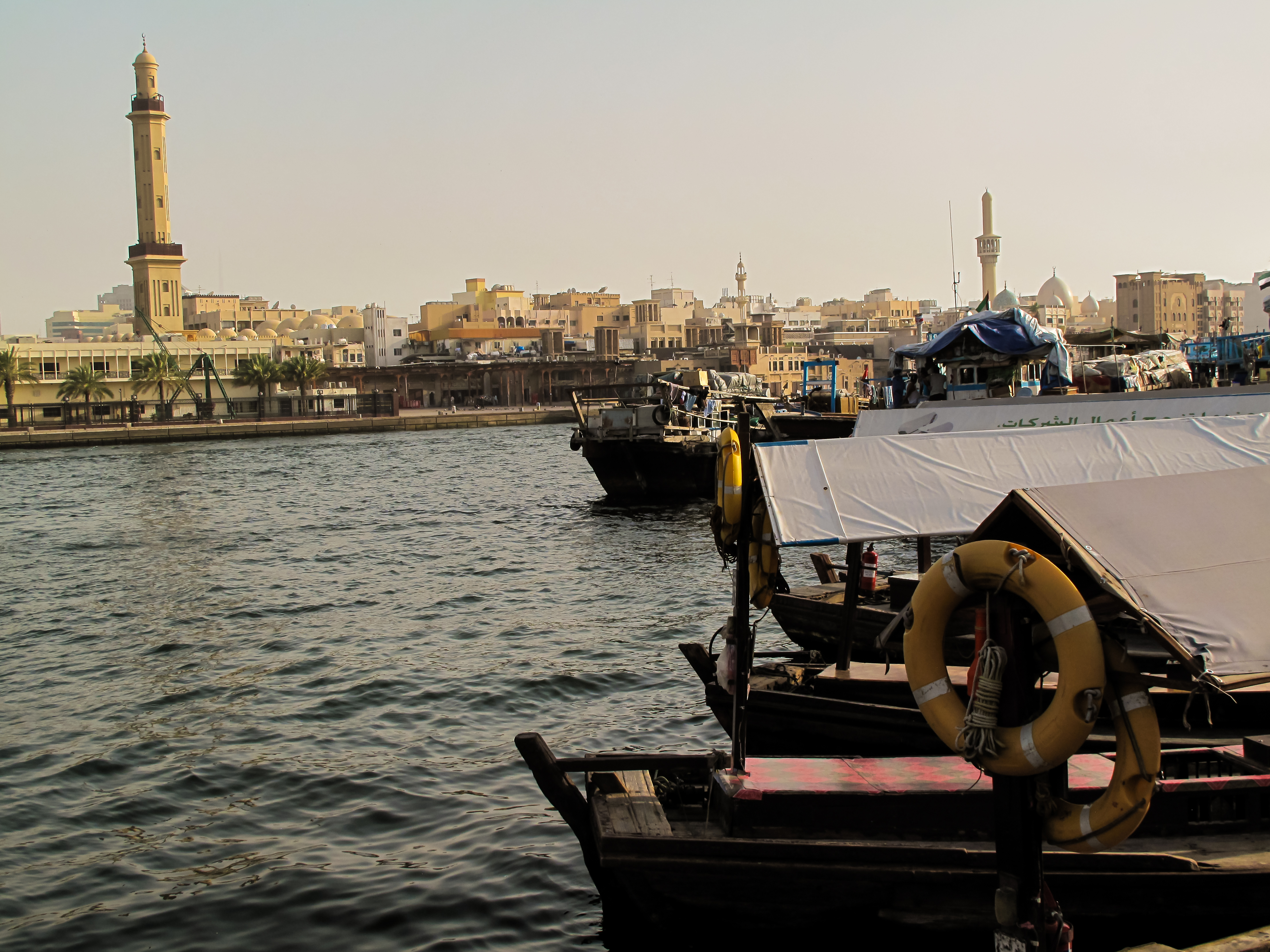
Dhows on the Dubai Creek in 2013
