= List of bridges in the United Arab Emirates =

Bridges in UAE

== Historical and architectural interest bridges ==
	Name	Arabic	Distinction	Length	Type	Carries Crosses	Opened	Location	Emirate	Ref.
1	Al-Maqta' Bridge	جسر المقطع		300 m (980 ft)	Arch; Steel tied arch Bow-string bridge	E 22 road Sheikh Rashid Bin Saeed Road; Khor Al Maqta	1967; 1997	Abu Dhabi; Grand Mosque District–Bain Al Jesrain; 24°25′13.5″N 54°29′09.5″E	Abu Dhabi	
2	Tolerance Bridge	جسر التسامح	Span : 205 m (673 ft)	210 m (690 ft)	Arch; Steel through arch	Footbridge; Dubai Canal	2017	Dubai; Al Safa; 25°11′20.8″N 55°14′40.2″E	Dubai	
3	Dubai Water Canal Footbridge III			140 m (460 ft)	Truss; Steel	Footbridge; Dubai Canal	2017	Dubai; Jumeirah; 25°11′35.7″N 55°14′28.0″E	Dubai	
4	Safa Bridge			120 m (390 ft)	Suspension; Self-anchored, steel box girder deck, steel pylons	Footbridge; Dubai Canal		Dubai; Al Safa; 25°11′11.9″N 55°14′53.2″E	Dubai	

== Major road and railway bridges ==
This table presents a non-exhaustive list of the road and railway bridges with spans greater than 100 metres (328 ft) or total lengths longer than 5,000 metres (16,404 ft).

	Name	Arabic	Span	Length	Type	Carries Crosses	Opened	Location	Emirate	Ref.
1	Sheikh Rashid bin Saeed Crossing project		667 m (2,188 ft)	1,600 m (5,200 ft)	Arch; Through arch 667+560	Road bridge Dubai Metro (Green Line); Dubai Creek		Dubai; Al Jaddaf–Dubai Festival City; 25°12′47.9″N 55°20′35.6″E	Dubai	
2	Saadiyat Island Bridge	جسر الشيخ خليفة بن زايد	200 m (660 ft)	1,455 m (4,774 ft)	Box girder Prestressed concrete 110+200+135	E 12 road Sheikh Khalifa Bin Zayed Road; Khor Laffan	2009	Abu Dhabi; Al Mina–Saadiyat Island; 24°31′19.4″N 54°24′10.4″E	Abu Dhabi	
3	Hudayriat Bridge	جسر الحديريات	200 m (660 ft)	1,000 m (3,300 ft)	Cable-stayed; Concrete box girder deck, concrete pylons	Road bridge	2018	Abu Dhabi; Abu Dhabi Island–Al Hudayriat Island; 24°25′29.2″N 54°21′58.3″E	Abu Dhabi	
4	Sheikh Zayed Bridge	جسر الشيخ زايد	140 m (460 ft)	842 m (2,762 ft)	Arch; Composite steel/concrete through arch	E 10 road Sheikh Zayed Bin Sultan Road; Khor Al Maqta	2010	Abu Dhabi; Grand Mosque District–Bain Al Jesrain; 24°25′26.5″N 54°29′11.4″E	Abu Dhabi	
5	Infinity Bridge (Dubai)	جسر إنفينيتي	135 m (443 ft)		Box girder Prestressed concrete	Shindagha Corridor; Dubai Creek	2022	Dubai; Deira–Al Shindagha; 25°16′31.0″N 55°17′40.2″E	Dubai	
6	Dubai Marina Bridges		126 m (413 ft)	192 m (630 ft)	Box girder Prestressed concrete	Road bridges Dubai Marina	2003	Dubai; Dubai Marina; 25°04′17.4″N 55°07′58.5″E; 25°04′32.0″N 55°08′12.7″E; 25°04′47.4″N 55°08′27.3″E; 25°04′56.0″N 55°08′40.7″E	Dubai	(Note: There are four almost identical bridges with span varying from 113 to 126 metres (371 to 413 ft).)
7	Al Ittihad Bridge project	جسر الاتحاد		2,700 m (8,900 ft)	Cable-stayed; Steel arch	D 74 road Dubai Creek		Dubai; Deira–Umm Hurair 2; 25°14′55.7″N 55°19′33.8″E	Dubai	
8	Elevated viaduct (Dubai Metro Red Line)				Box girder Prestressed concrete Beam bridge Prestressed concrete	Dubai Metro (Red Line)	2009	Dubai; 25°11′09.1″N 55°15′19.3″E	Dubai	
9	Elevated viaduct (Dubai Metro Green Line)				Box girder Prestressed concrete Beam bridge Prestressed concrete	Dubai Metro (Green Line)	2011	Dubai; Deira–Al Qusais–Al Twar; 25°16′48.0″N 55°21′21.6″E	Dubai	

== See also ==
- Transport in the United Arab Emirates
- Arab Mashreq International Road Network
- Rail transport in the United Arab Emirates
- Geography of the United Arab Emirates
- List of wadis of the United Arab Emirates
- List of roads in Dubai
- List of bridges and tunnels in Dubai

== Notes and references ==
- Notes
- Nicolas Janberg. "International Database for Civil and Structural Engineering". Structurae.com.
- Others references
