= Timeline of Dubai =

The following is a timeline of the history of the city of Dubai, United Arab Emirates.

== Prior to 20th century ==
- 1787 – Al Fahidi Fort built (approximate date).
- 1833
  - Dubai taken by "Al bu Falasah clansmen of the Bani Yas," becoming independent of Abu Dhabi Emirate.
  - Obaid bin Saeed bin Rashid and Maktoum bin Butti bin Suhail are its first (joint) rulers.
- 1836 Obaid bin Saeed dies. Maktoum bin Butti becomes the sole ruler.
- 1852 – Saeed bin Shakhbut Al Maktoum becomes ruler of Dubai.
- 1859 – Hasher bin Maktoum becomes ruler of Dubai.
- 1865 – Indian Banians begin to arrive in Dubai.
- 1886 – Rashid bin Maktoum becomes ruler of Dubai.
- 1892 – Rulers of Trucial Oman sign exclusive treaty of protection with United Kingdom.
- 1894 – Maktoum bin Hasher Al Maktoum becomes ruler of Dubai.
- 1896 – Saeed Al Maktoum's House built.

== In 20th century ==
- 1903-1904
  - Dubai becomes "the main port of the Trucial Coast."
- 1904 – British-India Steam Navigation Company begins regular service to Dubai.
- 1906 – Butti bin Suhail Al Maktoum becomes ruler of Dubai.
- 1910 - The British bombard Dubai with high explosive munitions - the Hyacinth Incident.
- 1912
  - Al Ahmadiya School established
  - Saeed bin Maktoum bin Hasher Al Maktoum becomes ruler of Dubai.
- 1929
  - Collapse of the pearling industry.
- 1934 – British air base established.
- 1938 – 'Majlis' economic/political "reform movement" occurs.
- 1939 – Majlis al Tujjar (merchant committee) established.
- 1941 – Dubai Post Office opened.
- 1946 – October: Imperial Bank of Persia (to become British Bank of the Middle East, then HSBC) opened in Dubai.
- 1948 – Abu Dhabi-Dubai border dispute.
- 1949
  - 15 July: Mohammed bin Rashid Al Maktoum, the current ruler of Dubai, was born in Shindaga.
- 1950 – "Petroleum exploration" begins in the Dubai area.
- 1952 – Iranian consulate established.
- 1953 – National Front (anti-British political group) formed.
- 1956
  - Jashanmal shop in business.
  - 1 June: Dubai Police Force founded in Naif Fort.
- 1957 – Dubai Municipality established.
- 1958
  - 9 September: Rashid bin Saeed Al Maktoum becomes ruler of Dubai when his father Sheikh Saeed dies.
- 1959
  - Dubai Creek dredged.
  - Dubai Airport opens.
  - DNATA (Dubai National Air Travel Agency) established.
- 1961 – 7 April: The MV Dara explodes and sinks off the shore of Dubai, killing 238 people.
- 1962 – Population: 55,000 (estimate).
- 1963
  - 23 May: Al Maktoum Bridge opens.
  - The Trucial rulers sign an agreement to issue a decree to abolish slavery.
- 1965
  - 15 May: Asphalt runway opens at Dubai International Airport.
- 1966 – Fateh Oil Field discovered offshore in vicinity of Dubai.
- 1967 – Dubai Zoo opens.
- 1968
  - 18 February: Sheikh Zayed and Sheikh Rashid agree to Union at Argoub Al Sedirah.
- 1969 – Dubai TV begins broadcasting.
- 1971
  - 10 July: The Trucial States Council of rulers agrees on Union.
  - 2 December: Six Trucial States, including Dubai, form the United Arab Emirates.
  - Dubai Country Club and Dubai Museum established.
- 1972
  - January: A coup in neighboring Sharjah kills ruler Sheikh Khaled and is put down by Sheikh Mohammed bin Rashid.
  - February: Ras Al Khaimah joins the UAE.
  - 5 October: Port Rashid is inaugurated.
- 1973
  - Dubai drops Qatari Riyal and adopts use of Dirham currency.
- 1975
  - Al Shindagha Tunnel and Safa Park open.
  - Dubai Islamic Bank established.
  - 5 May: Sheikh Rashid decrees establishment of Dubai Aluminium – Dubal.
  - Arabtec Construction in business.
- 1976 – Al Garhoud Bridge opens.
- 1977 – Dubai 33 television begins broadcasting.
- 1978
  - 16 April: English-language Khaleej Times newspaper begins publication.
  - September: Rival Gulf News begins publication.
  - Dubai World Trade Centre built.
  - Oil production at Falah oil field begins.
- 1979
  - 26 February: Queen Elizabeth II inaugurates Dubai Desalination Plant.
  - Sheikh Mohammed marries Sheikha Hind.
  - Oil production at Rashid oil field begins.
  - Dubal Aluminium Company commences production.
  - Dubai International Convention Centre built.
  - Port of Jebel Ali inaugurated.
  - Gulf News begins publication.
- 1980
  - Dubai Municipal Council created; Hamdan bin Rashid Al Maktoum becomes chairman.
  - E 11 road (Abu Dhabi-Dubai) completed.
  - Al Bayan newspaper begins publication.
  - Population: 265,702.
- 1983
  - 17 May: Sheikha Latifa, the wife of ruler Sheikh Rashid, dies.
  - Dubai Drydocks open.
  - 20 December: Dubai Duty Free opens.
- 1984
  - Oil production at onshore field Margham begins.
  - Ruler Sheikh Rashid develops health problems; power shifts to his sons.
- 1985
  - 9 January: Decree establishing Jebel Ali Free Zone issued.
  - March: Airline Emirates established.
  - 25 October: Emirates makes inaugural flight to Karachi.
  - Dubai Medical College and UAE Contractors' Association established.
- 1989
  - Dubai Desert Classic golf contest begins.
  - 29 January: First Dubai Airshow inaugurated.
  - Majlis Gallery opens.
- 1990
  - 7 October: Dubai's ruler, Sheikh Rashid, dies.
  - 8 October: Maktoum bin Rashid Al Maktoum becomes ruler of Dubai and Prime Minister of the UAE.
- 1991
  - Juma al Majid Centre for Culture and Heritage established.
  - Dubai Creek Golf & Yacht Club opens.
  - May: Dubai Ports Authority formed by merging JAFZA and Port Rashid authorities.
- 1992
  - Majid Al Futtaim Group headquartered in Dubai.
  - 24 December: Godolphin's first horse Cutwater runs, – and wins – at Nad Al Sheba.
- 1995
  - 3 January: Sheikh Mohammed bin Rashid named crown prince of Dubai.
  - American University in Dubai established.
- 1996
  - 16 February: Dubai Shopping Festival launched.
  - 27 March: Dubai World Cup horse race − the world's richest − begins. Its first winner is American dirt track legend Cigar.
- 1997
  - World's first camel-llama cross-breeding accomplished.
  - Chicago Beach Hotel demolished.
  - Jumeirah (hotel chain) headquartered in Dubai.
- 1998 – Grand Mosque rebuilt.
  - Zayed University founded.
- 1999
  - Dubai Press Club formed.
  - International Center for Biosaline Agriculture headquartered in Dubai.
  - December: Burj Al Arab hotel inaugurated.
  - Emirates National Oil Company refinery begins operating.
  - 29 October: Dubai Internet City announced.
  - Dubai's real estate market is opened to non-GCC nationals for the first time.

== 21st century ==
=== 2000s ===
- 2000
  - 26 March: Dubai Financial Market founded.
  - 28 May: American University of Dubai inaugurated.
  - Dubai Airport new terminal built.
  - Nakheel Properties headquartered in Dubai.
  - Al Barsha area development and Dubai Marathon begin.
  - Dubai Internet City opens.
  - 4 November: Dubai Media City inaugurated.
- 2001
  - 15 January: e-junior begins broadcasting.
  - 1 May: Artificial archipelagos the Palm Jumeirah and Palm Jebel Ali announced.
  - June: Construction begins on Palm Jumeirah.
- 2002
  - 9 January: Dubai Desert Conservation Reserve and eco-resort Al Maha founded.
  - 9 February: Million square feed academic free zone Dubai Knowledge Village announced.
  - 16 February: Dubai International Financial Centre inaugurated.
  - 6 November: $1.8 billion Dubai Healthcare City free economic zone announced
  - Artificial archipelago Palm Jebel Ali construction begins.
  - Population: 1,089,000.
  - The Dubai Multi Commodities Center is established.
- 2003
  - September: International Monetary Fund meets in Dubai.
  - Al Arabiya television and CNBC Arabiya television begin broadcasting.
  - Executive Council of Dubai and Dubai Media Incorporated established.
  - Dubai Knowledge Village opens.
  - First Dubai Tennis Championships.
  - June: International Media Production Zone (IMPZ) launched.
  - 5 May: The World (archipelago) project announced.
  - Dubai Festival City construction begins.
  - 12 May: Dubai Maritime City project announced.
  - 16 June: Emirates places $19 billion biggest order in aviation history for 71 wide-bodied planes.
  - Dubai Humanitarian City established. (Later to become International Humanitarian City)
  - 7days newspaper begins publication.
- 2004
  - Dubai Autodrome opens.
  - Dubai One television begins broadcasting.
  - Dubai Silicon Oasis is inaugurated.
  - Planned second airport to be located in Jebel Ali confirmed.
  - September: Foundation stone of the world's tallest tower, Burj Khalifa, laid.
  - October: Dubai Holding investment company established.
  - December: Dubai International Film Festival inaugurated
  - December Business Bay development project announced.
  - December: Dubai School of Government launched (To become Mohammed bin Rashid School of Government).
- 2005
  - 27 January: Dubai holds its first FEI World Endurance Riding Championship, Dubai International Endurance City opens.
  - 7 March: Permanent Committee for Labour Affairs established.
  - Emirates Today newspaper begins publication.
  - RAK Petroleum is headquartered in Dubai.
  - Mall of the Emirates (with Ski Dubai) opens.
  - Dubai RTA (Roads and Transport Authority) formed.
  - Dubai Gold & Commodities Exchange inaugurated.
  - DP World founded from the merger of Dubai Ports Authority and Dubai Ports International
  - September: Construction labor strike.
  - October: Dubai police introduces hotline for workers to report labour issues.
  - November: $8 billion Jebel Ali Airport City project renamed Dubai World Central.
- 2006
  - January: Maktoum bin Rashid Al Maktoum dies in Australia's Gold Coast.
  - January: Mohammed bin Rashid Al Maktoum becomes ruler of Dubai and Vice President of the UAE.
  - February: Mohammed bin Rashid Al Maktoum becomes Prime Minister of the UAE.
  - February: $15 billion Dubai Aerospace Enterprise launched.
  - February: Dubai International Academic City development begins.
  - March: Dubai port operator DP World acquires P&O for $7 billion.
  - March: US House committee votes 62–2 to block DP World from operating US ports. DP World divests them.
  - 21 March: Construction labor demonstration.
  - 16 May: Construction labor strike.
  - Emirates Green Building Council headquartered in Dubai.
  - Dubai World investment company established.
  - Population: 1,354,980.
  - Dubai's education regulator, the Knowledge and Human Development Agency (KHDA) founded.
  - December: Women-only pink taxis go into service.
- 2007
  - February: New UAE telco 'Du' launches.
  - June: Dubai's Salik (Meaning 'clear') road toll comes into effect.
  - June: Dubai Real Estate Corporation was founded.
  - July: 'Temporary' crossing, the Floating Bridge opens.
  - August: Real Estate regulator Real Estate Regulatory Agency (RERA) founded.
  - Business Bay Crossing, originally named the Ras Al Khor Bridge, opens.
  - Gulf Art Fair begins.
  - Sheikh Mohammed announces the Dubai Strategic Plan 2015, a five-point long-term strategy for the city.
  - Dubai World Cup prize money raised to $10 million.
  - Dubai International City built.
  - September: Dubai Cares charity founded. The initial fund-raising drive raised over Dhs1 billion.
- 2008
  - March: Dubai Culture & Arts Authority formed.
  - March: New Maktoum Bridge opened.
  - March: New low-cost carrier Flydubai announced.
  - Dubai Sports City opens.
  - Tashkeel (art entity) established.
  - Airport Dubai International Terminal 3 built.
  - 1,500 room Atlantis, The Palm hotel & resort launched with 1,000 fireworks.
- 2009
  - New Year celebrations and the opening celebration of the Dubai Shopping Festival cancelled in solidarity with Gaza.
  - 29 March: Chechen Yamadayev murdered in Dubai.
  - Dubai Mall, the world's largest shopping mall, inaugurated.
  - 1 June: Flydubai commences operations.
  - September: Red Line (Dubai Metro) begins operating.
  - Almas Tower built.
  - Dubai International Cricket Stadium opens.
  - Dubai World restructures.

=== 2010s ===
- 2010
  - 4 January: Burj Khalifa skyscraper opens (tallest in the world).
  - 19 January: Palestinian Mahmoud Al-Mabhouh assassinated.
  - 28 January: Meydan Racecourse opens.
  - 4 February: New oilfield east of Rashid field announced, named Jalila.
  - 1 July: Al Maktoum International Airport begins operations.
- 2011
  - Green Line (Dubai Metro) begins operating Palm Deira station (Dubai Metro) opens.
  - Salsali Private Museum founded.
  - 11 October: Emirates NBD takes over Dubai Bank.
- 2012
  - Princess Tower and JW Marriott Marquis Dubai built.
  - 21 March: Dubai Modern Art Museum & Opera House District projects announced.
  - 12 June: Dubai formally launches its bid for World Expo 2020.
  - 30 November: Restoration of 'Union House', where the UAE treaty was signed in 1971, commences.
- 2013
  - 13 February: $1.5bn Bluewaters Island project announced, to include world's largest Ferris Wheel.
  - 4 March: Sheikh Mohammed establishes the Emirates Literature Foundation, to include the Dubai International Writers' Centre.
  - Al Barsha Police Station built.
  - The Mine (gallery) opens.
  - October: Sheikh Mohammed announces the Dubai Water Canal.
  - Population: 2,214,000.
  - 27 November: Dubai and the UAE win the bid for World Expo 2020.
- 2014
  - February: Dubai launches $1mn 'Drones for Good' award.
  - 5 July: The World's largest mall and indoor theme park, the 48 million square foot Mall of the World project announced.
  - 16 July: The establishment of the UAE Space Agency and the launch of a Mars mission is announced.
  - 8 September: Dubai launches the Mohammed bin Rashid Centre for Government Innovation.
  - 27 October: Dubai announces $1.2 billion investment in innovation through free zone operator TECOM.
  - 17 December: Dubai Plan 2021 development strategy is announced.
  - Opera Grand, the first tower in the Dubai Opera House District, opens.
- 2015
  - Bicycle regulations issued.
  - 6 May: UAE Mars probe named Hope.
- 2016
  - Opening of Dubai Parks and Resorts
  - 3 August: Emirates Flight 521 crashes during landing at Dubai-International Airport. In the ensuing blaze, 1 firefighter is killed. Everyone on board the Boeing 777-300 survives.
  - November: Sheikh Mohammed inaugurates the Dubai Water Canal.
- 2017
  - 1 May: Dubai Font, Dubai's own font, was launched.
  - 21 Nov: Dubai Safari Park opened to public.
- 2018
  - 1 Jan: Dubai Frame, World's best new attraction opening in 2018
  - 25 January - UAE princess Latifa escapes from the UAE with some friends including a US-French spy. They are all arrested by Indian Navy and Coast guard in the Arabian sea, near the coast of India. They are handed over to their UAE counterparts and taken back to the UAE.
  - 2018 is declared as the Year Of Zayed in honour of the 100th birth anniversary of Sheikh Zayed bin Sultan Al Nahyan
  - 30 October – KhalifaSat, the first entirely Emirati-made satellite, is launched into orbit.
- 2019
  - 2019 is declared as the Year Of Tolerance.
  - February 3 – Pope Francis makes a historic trip to Abu Dhabi meeting Ahmed al-Tayeb. Both sign on document "Human Fraternity For World Peace And Living Together".

=== 2020s ===
==== 2020 ====
  - January 30 – COVID-19 pandemic in the United Arab Emirates
    - The Emirati government confirmed the first cases related to the COVID-19 pandemic in the United Arab Emirates.
  - July 19 - The Hope probe was launched on 19 July 2020 under the Emirates Mars Mission, a United Arab Emirates Space Agency uncrewed space exploration mission to Mars.
  - August 13 – Israel and the UAE agree to normalise relations, marking the third Israel–Arab peace deal.
  - September 19 - IPL 2020 was hosted in UAE.

=== January ===
- 24 January:
  - The cabinet of the United Arab Emirates approves the establishment of an embassy in Tel Aviv.
  - Israel opens an embassy in the United Arab Emirates, appointing Eitan Na'eh as head of the envoy. It will be in a temporary office, until a permanent location will be set up.

=== June ===
- 11 June — During the 2021 United Nations Security Council Elections, the United Arab Emirates was elected to serve a two-year term as a non-permanent member of the United Nations Security Council. It marked the second time the UAE has sat on the Security Council.

=== July ===
- The Hope probe, launched on 19 July 2020, went into orbit around Mars on 9 February 2021. It was launched as a part of the Emirates Mars Mission is a United Arab Emirates Space Agency uncrewed space exploration mission to Mars.

=== October ===
- 1 October - The Dubai World Expo 2020. Delayed from 2020 to 2021 due to Covid-19 restrictions.
- 15 October - IPL 2021 was hosted across Abu Dhabi, Dubai and Sharjah.

=== December ===
- 12 December – Max Verstappen wins the Abu Dhabi Grand Prix and the Championship against Lewis Hamilton.
- 13 December – Prime Minister of Israel Naftali Bennett and Sheikh Mohamed bin Zayed Al Nahyan discuss strengthening bilateral trade and cooperation in multiple areas, at the first meeting of the leaders of the two countries.

=== January ===
- 1 January
  - The UAE moved its Friday-Saturday weekend to Saturday-Sunday in a landmark reform that came into force on January 1, 2022. The new system was rolled out across all government entities and most firms in the private sector followed suit.
  - The United Arab Emirates announces that unvaccinated citizens will be banned from travel and that vaccinated citizens will need to receive a booster dose of the COVID-19 vaccine beginning on January 10.
- 3 January - Houthi forces capture a United Arab Emirates-flagged cargo ship, the Rwabee, off Al Hudaydah, Yemen. The UAE government says that the vessel was carrying equipment from a closed coalition field hospital on Socotra while the Houthis say that the vessel was carrying military equipment.
- 17 January - 2022 Abu Dhabi attack: Three people are killed in a drone attack on petrol tanks at a major oil storage facility near Abu Dhabi International Airport. The Yemen-based Houthis claim responsibility, saying that they launched "five ballistic missiles and a large number of drones".
- 24 January - The United Arab Emirates Armed Forces intercepts two ballistic missiles over the Emirati capital Abu Dhabi. The Yemen-based Houthis claim responsibility for the attack. American troops stationed at Al Dhafra Air Base near the capital take shelter in bunkers during the attack.

=== February ===
- 12 February - 2021 FIFA Club World Cup: In association football, English club Chelsea win their first FIFA Club World Cup title after beating Brazilian club Palmeiras 2–1 after extra time in the final at the Mohammed bin Zayed Stadium in Abu Dhabi. Chelsea defender Thiago Silva wins the tournament's Golden Ball award.
- 18 February - India and the United Arab Emirates sign a free trade agreement over digital goods, raw materials, and apparels. It is the first major trade deal signed by India since Prime Minister Narendra Modi came into power in 2014.
- 22 February - Museum of the Future opened by the Government of the United Arab Emirates. The choice of the date was officially made because 22 February 2022 is a palindrome date. It is a landmark devoted to innovative and futuristic ideologies located in the Financial District of Dubai. It has three main elements: green hill, building, and void.
- 26 February - The United Arab Emirates removes the mandatory face masks mandate in outdoor spaces, making the use of them optional.

=== March ===
- 28 March - The foreign ministers of Israel, Egypt, Morocco, Bahrain and the United Arab Emirates, as well as the United States Secretary of State, meet in Sde Boker, Israel, and agree to hold regular meetings about regional security and commit to further expanding economic and diplomatic cooperation.
- 31 March - The world expo in Dubai, which was delayed to October 1, 2021, closes after six months.

=== May ===
- 13 May - President of the United Arab Emirates and ruler of Abu Dhabi Khalifa bin Zayed Al Nahyan dies at the age of 73.
- 14 May - The Federal Supreme Council of the United Arab Emirates appoints Mohamed bin Zayed Al Nahyan as the country's new president, who also inherits the Emirate of Abu Dhabi after the death of his half-brother Khalifa bin Zayed Al Nahyan.
- 23 May - Two people are killed and 120 others are injured when a gas cylinder catches fire and explodes at a restaurant in Abu Dhabi.
- 24 May - The United Arab Emirates confirms its first case of monkeypox.

=== June ===
- 6 June - The South African Justice Department confirms that Rajesh Gupta and Atul Gupta of the influential Gupta family have been arrested in the United Arab Emirates for engaging in corrupt practices during the Zuma presidency.

=== July ===
- 29 July - The UAE records its heaviest rainfall in 27 years, with seven people killed by flooding in the Emirates of Sharjah and Fujairah.

=== August ===
- 21 August - The United Arab Emirates announces the reinstallation of its ambassador to Iran, which will take effect "in the coming days", more than six years after it cut off diplomatic relations with the Islamic republic.
- 2023

=== April ===
- 25 April – Mohammed bin Rashid Space Centre (MBRSC) lunar rover Rashid attempted to land on the Moon's Atlas crater aboard ispace's Hakuto-R Mission 1 lander however the lander crashed into the Moon and the rover was destroyed.

=== March ===
- 19 March – Scientists discover ruins of a pearling town near Umm Al Quwain. The town is considered to be the oldest ever found in the country, dating back to the 6th century.
- 29 March – UAE President Mohamed bin Zayed Al Nahyan announces that he has named his son Khaled bin Mohamed Al Nahyan as the Abu Dhabi Crown Prince. City Football Group owner Mansour bin Zayed Al Nahyan is also appointed as Vice President.

=== May ===
- 22 May – SeaWorld Abu Dhabi opens its door to the public.

=== June ===
- 8 June – UAE and Cambodia sign a Comprehensive Economic Partnership Agreement (CEPA).

=== November ===
- 4–6 November – 2023 United Nations Climate Change conference is held in Dubai.
- 17 November – The Al Dhafra solar farm, the largest solar farm in the world, comes online in the United Arab Emirates. The solar farm is expected to power around 200,000 homes.

=== Sports ===
- June – 2023 World Para Powerlifting Championships
- 2022–23 UAE Pro League

=== January ===
- 1 January – The United Arab Emirates formally joins the BRICS group.
- 1 January – Turkey permits visa free travel for Emirati citizens.

=== February ===
- 14 February - Indian Prime Minister Narendra Modi inaugurates the BAPS Hindu Mandir, the first Hindu temple in Abu Dhabi.
- 22 February - United Kingdom opens Electronic Travel Authorization for Emirati citizens.
- 23 February - The Financial Action Task Force removes the UAE from its "gray list" of countries not fully complying with measures to combat money laundering and terrorism financing.

=== April ===
- 4 April - Five people are killed in a fire at a residential building in Sharjah.
- 16 April - Heavy rains cause floods in multiple areas in the United Arab Emirates. The National Center for Meteorology records the country's heaviest rainfall in 75 years. At least four people are reported killed.

=== June ===
- 19 June – Sudan's UN envoy accuses the United Arab Emirates at the United Nations Security Council of arming the Rapid Support Forces in the Sudanese civil war (2023-present). The United Arab Emirates rejects the accusations as fabrications to mislead the international community.
- 26 June – United Arab Emirates and Cambodia Comprehensive Economic Partnership Agreement (CEPA) enters into force.

=== July ===
- 10 July – The Federal Court of Appeal sentences 43 people, including several human rights activists, to life imprisonment in a mass trial on charges of plotting acts of violence and destabilisation.
- 21 July – Fifty-seven Bangladeshi expatriates are sentenced to varying prison terms for holding protests in support of the 2024 Bangladesh quota reform movement. They are later pardoned by UAE president Mohamed bin Zayed Al Nahyan on 3 September.
- 29 July – The United Arab Emirates grants lottery licenses for the first time in its history.

=== August ===
- 21 August – The United Arab Emirates accepts the credentials of Badruddin Haqqani as ambassador of the Taliban-led Islamic Emirate of Afghanistan.

=== September ===
- 23 September – The United Arab Emirates becomes the second country after India to be designated as a "major defense partner" by the United States.
- 24 September – Four soldiers are killed and nine injured after an accident while transporting ammunition in the UAE.
- 29 September – The residence of the UAE's ambassador to Sudan is bombed in Khartoum, with the UAE accusing the Sudanese Armed Forces of launching an airstrike and the latter blaming the Rapid Support Forces for the incident.

=== October ===
- 31 October – United States Customs and Border Protection admits Emirati citizens into Global Entry program.

=== November ===
- 6 November – The UAE and Australia sign a Comprehensive Economic Partnership Agreement (CEPA).
- 17 November – Stocks listed in the United Arab Emirates top $1 trillion USD for the first time.
- 24 November – Zvi Kogan, an Israeli-Moldovan rabbi working for Chabad, is found killed after being reported missing in Dubai on 21 November. The Israeli government attributes his death as motivated by anti-Semitism.

=== December ===
- 3 December – United Arab Emirates foreign aid reach AED 360 billion ($98 billion) since its establishment in 1971.
- 26 December – A light aircraft crashes off the coast of Ras Al Khaimah, killing the pilot and her sole companion.

== See also ==
- History of Dubai
- List of rulers of the emirate of Dubai
- List of universities and colleges in Dubai
- List of schools in Dubai
- List of companies of Dubai
- List of shopping malls in Dubai
- List of hospitals in Dubai
- List of tallest residential buildings in Dubai
- Timelines of other cities in United Arab Emirates: Abu Dhabi
- Years in the United Arab Emirates

== Bibliography ==
=== Published in 20th century ===
- "Dibai (Dabai)". Persian Gulf Pilot. Washington DC: Government Printing Office. 1920.
- "United Arab Emirates: Dubai", Arab Gulf States, Lonely Planet, 1993, p. 308+, OL 8314448M
- Richard Trench (ed.), Arab Gulf Cities: Doha, Abu Dhabi, Dubai, Sharjah (Archives Editions, 1994)
- Fatma Al-Sayegh (1998). "Merchants' Role in a Changing Society: The Case of Dubai, 1900–90". Middle Eastern Studies. 34 (1): 87–102. doi:10.1080/00263209808701211. JSTOR 4283919.
- Vision 2010, 2000

=== Published in 21st century ===
2000s

- Sampler and Eigner. From Sand to Silicon. 2003.
- Yasser Elsheshtawy (2004). "Redrawing boundaries: Dubai, an emerging global city". In Yasser Elsheshtawy (ed.). Planning Middle Eastern Cities. Routledge. pp. 169–199. ISBN 978-1-134-41010-1.
- Dubai: The Complete Residents' Guide. Dubai: Explorer Publishing. 2006. ISBN 978-976-8182-76-0.
- Dubai Strategic Plan, 2007
- Ahmed Kanna (2007). "Dubai in a Jagged World". Middle East Report (243). USA: Middle East Research and Information Project: 22–29. JSTOR 25164788.
- "Dubai: Sudden City", National Geographic Magazine, vol. 211, Washington DC, January 2007
- Deeba Haider (2008). "Growing Pains of Dubai". In Salma K. Jayyusi; et al. (eds.). City in the Islamic World. Leiden: Koninklijke Brill. p. 1063+. ISBN 9789004162402.
- Michael Pacione (2008), "Dubai", in Michael R.T. Dumper; Bruce E. Stanley (eds.), Cities of the Middle East and North Africa, Santa Barbara, USA: ABC-CLIO, p. 138+, ISBN 9781576079195
- Martin Hvidt (2009). "The Dubai Model: An Outline of Key Development-Process Elements in Dubai". International Journal of Middle East Studies. 41 (3): 397–418. doi:10.1017/S0020743809091120. JSTOR 40389254. S2CID 129975219.

2010s

- Syed Ali (2010). Dubai: Gilded Cage. Yale University Press. ISBN 978-0-300-15217-3.
- Yasser Elsheshtawy (2010). Dubai: Behind an Urban Spectacle. Routledge. ISBN 978-1-135-26119-1.
- Stephen J. Ramos (2010). Dubai Amplified: The Engineering of a Port Geography. Ashgate. ISBN 978-1-4094-8884-2.
- Pranay Gupte (2011). Dubai: the Making of a Megapolis. Penguin. ISBN 978-0-670-08517-0.
- Ahmed Kanna (2011). Dubai, the City as Corporation. USA: University of Minnesota Press. ISBN 978-0-8166-5630-1.
- John Biln; Mohamed El-Amrousi (2014). "Dubai's Heritage House Museums: A Semiosis of Melancholy". Traditional Dwellings and Settlements Review. 25. International Association for the Study of Traditional Environments – via University of California, Berkeley.
- "Dubai's five-year economic turnaround: timeline; Key dates in the emirate's journey from bust to boom", The Daily Telegraph, UK, March 2014
