= Kurdistan Region–United Arab Emirates relations =

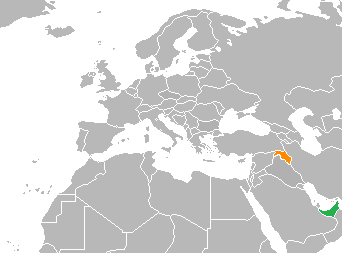

- United Arab Emirates: Kurdistan Region

Kurdistan Region–United Arab Emirates relations are bilateral relations between Kurdistan Region (Note: While Kurdistan Region refers to the autonomous Kurdish region in Northern Iraq, Iraqi Kurdistan is a geographical term referring to the Kurdish area of Iraq) and United Arab Emirates. While Kurdistan Region has no representation the United Arab Emirates, the latter has a consulate general in Erbil since 2012. The opening of an Emirati consulate general was discussed during a visit in Erbil by Emirati Foreign Minister Abdullah bin Zayed Al Nahyan in February 2011.

== History ==
Kurdish specialist Marianna Charountaki believes that the United Arab Emirates "interacts with the KRG as a de facto state entity". Kurdish Prime Minister Nechirvan Barzani has described the ties with the United Arab Emirates as being: "very important to the Kurds. They have offered their services to help us in the region. We have very good relations with all [the GCC members] but ties with the UAE are closer. The UAE are interested in investments and energy". Emirati Minister of Cabinet Affairs & the Future Mohammed Al Gergawi described the ties between the United Arab Emirates and Kurdistan Region as "good". He stated that: "We will need the Kurdistan Region and the Kurdistan Region will need us because we have the same principles and concerns".

In May 2012, Kurdish President Masoud Barzani visited the United Arab Emirates and met with Emirati Prime Minister and Vice-President Mohammed bin Rashid Al Maktoum and Crown Prince of Abu Dhabi and Deputy Supreme Commander of the Armed Forces Mohammed bin Zayed Al Nahyan to strengthen political, economic, cultural and investment ties. Barzani visited the United Arab Emirates again in November 2012, meeting both Mohammed bin Rashid Al Maktoum and Mohammed bin Zayed Al Nahyan again. In January 2014, it was estimated that the United Arab Emirates' investments in Kurdistan Region amounted to about 2,5 billion dollars. Furthermore, 134 Emirati companies were present in the region.

The Emirati government has built two hospitals in Kurdistan Region for refugees and internally displaced people. In July 2017, Emirati energy firm TAQA started production in the Atrush Field, which it has a 39.9% working interest in.

== See also ==
- Foreign relations of Kurdistan Region
- Foreign relations of the United Arab Emirates
- Iraq–United Arab Emirates relations
