= List of bridges and tunnels in Dubai =

These are the bridges in Dubai that are completed, under construction, proposed or approved.

== Operation ==
Bridges in Dubai are operated by the Roads & Transport Authority (RTA).

== List of completed bridges ==
Bridge	Opened	Length (m)	Cost	Number of lanes	Vehicles per hour
Al Maktoum Bridge	1963				9,500
Floating Bridge, Dubai	16 July 2007	300 meters	155 million dirhams	12	6,000
Al Garhoud Bridge	1976	520 metres	415 million dirhams	6	9,000
Business Bay Crossing	June 2007	1.6 km	800 million dirhams	13	26,000
Infinity Bridge	16 January 2022	295 metres	393 million dirhams	12	24,000

== List of bridges under construction or Approved ==
- Sheikh Rashid bin Saeed Crossing, upon completion will become worlds longest arch bridge, and will become sixth crossing across Dubai Creek.
- Dubai Smile, is an approved bridge which will supersede the existing Floating Bridge, upon completion it will become seventh crossing across Dubai Creek.

Bridge	Expected completion	Length (m)	Cost	Number of lanes	Vehicles per hour
Sheikh Rashid bin Saeed Crossing	2012	1.6 km	2.5 billion dirhams	12	9,500
Dubai Smile	2018	300 meters	810 million dirhams	12	24,000
The Fifth Bridge^{[A]}			2.5 billion dirhams	12	

Notes
A. Approved for construction.

== List of tunnels in The United Arab Emirates ==
Bridge	Opened	Length (m)	Cost	Number of lanes	Vehicles per hour
Al Shindagha Tunnel	1975	550 Meters	394 Million Dhs	4	15,000 vehicles per hour
Dubai Airport tunnel	Constructed during the mid 2000s, goes under Dubai Airport	1500 Meters	686 Million Dhs	6	1,650 vehicles Per hour
Palm Jumeirah tunnel	2006	750 metre	AED 400.00 Million	6	3,000 vehicles per hour

== See also ==
- List of buildings in Dubai
