= Iraqis in the United Arab Emirates =

Total population
- 250,000

Regions with significant populations
- Abu Dhabi, Dubai and Sharjah.

Languages
- Mesopotamian Arabic, Kurdish (Sorani, Feyli and Kurmanji dialects), and Neo-Aramaic (Assyrian)

Religion
- Islam, Syriac Christianity

Related ethnic groups
- Arabs, Armenians, Assyrians, Azeris, Iranians, Mizrahim, Turkmen

Iraqis in the United Arab Emirates have a population exceeding 200,000, closer estimates report a total of 250,000 Iraqis in the Emirates. Since its independence, Iraqis have contributed in the development of UAE, as engineers, politicians and in other fields. Most notably Adnan Pachachi who was appointed as Minister of State in the first Government of the Emirate of Abu Dhabi. Pachachi is known for his role in submitting the UAE's application for membership in the United Nations. In a meeting with Prime Minister of Iraq, Mustafa Al-Kadhimi, Mohamed bin Zayed Al Nahyan stated that "Iraqis have contributed in building the UAE, and there are many of them who worked, built, developed and helped build the Emirates, and we mention this credit to them, whether engineers, doctors, or even politicians and others. There are still many Iraqis living in the UAE, and they are credited.”

The Iraqi people tend to be spread out over various emirates of the country, with areas of high concentration being Abu Dhabi and Dubai.

== Background ==
Early migration of Iraqi people to the Emirates began after Abdul Salam Arif's 1968 Arab nationalist revolution in Baghdad which resulted in a high influx of Iraqis moving their businesses to Dubai and continued to do so during the 1970s, as well as throughout the Iran–Iraq War, the first Gulf War and the further civil unrest in Iraq due to the 2003 invasion of Iraq, the ensuing war, and the renewed war involving the Islamic State lasting until 2017.

The majority of Iraqi expatriates that fled to the UAE are educated and affluent peoples who are now active in Emirati society, from being engineers to teachers and jewellers, as well as being involved in business and the media as presenters and news anchors.

== Economic contributions ==
There are 500 Iraqi companies operating in the Jebel Ali Free Zone alone, an economic hub located in Jebel Ali, a city in Dubai.

== Iraqi people in the United Arab Emirates ==
- Rosil Al Azawi, television presenter and model born in Sharjah
- Ali Abu Khumra, television director
- Narcy, rapper born in Dubai
- Zeena Zaki, fashion designer based in Dubai

== See also ==
- Iraq–United Arab Emirates relations
- Adnan Pachachi
