= Al Ittihad Bridge =

Dubai Smile / Al Ittihad Bridge
- Coordinates: 25°14′55″N 55°19′32″E
- Carries: Vehicles
- Crosses: Dubai Creek
- Locale: Dubai, United Arab Emirates

Characteristics
- Design: Arch
- Total length: 420 metres (1,380 ft)
- Width: 61.6 metres (202 ft)
- Height: 100 metres (330 ft)
- Clearance below: 15 metres (49 ft)

Location
- Interactive map of Dubai Smile / Al Ittihad Bridge

Al Ittihad Bridge, also known as Dubai Smile Bridge and The Seventh Crossing, is a proposed 12-lane bridge across Dubai Creek in Dubai. The bridge is proposed to connect Bur Dubai from near the Dubai Courts and Dubai Creek Park and Deira near Deira City Centre and Dubai Golf Club. It is intended to replace the current Floating Bridge.

As of 2025, the bridge has still not been constructed.

== History ==
The Al Ittihad Bridge was originally announced on November 15, 2008 to replace the Floating Bridge and it was nicknamed Dubai Smile. It was also referred to as the Seventh Crossing. The cost then estimated was Dh810 million and construction was originally expected to be complete by 2012. It was announced on November 6, 2009 that the Floating Bridge will stay till 2014.

Khaleej Times on 7 August 2012 reported that the Dubai Smile will be open for traffic in the middle of 2013.

Sheikh Mohammad Bin Rashid Al Maktoum, Vice-President and Prime Minister of the UAE and Ruler of Dubai reviewed the project on 30 June 2013. The project cost was estimated to be Dh1.1 billion.

Contract for the construction was initially expected to be awarded by the end of 2014 and construction work was expected to be completed within 3 years. Project completion was later revised to late 2018.

== Specifications ==
Al Ittihad bridge is proposed to have 6 lanes and a footpath in both directions. It will be 61.6 metres (202 ft) wide and 15 metres (49 ft) high. The arc above the bridge will be 100 metres (328 ft), and the width of the waterway is 400 metres (1,312 ft). The crossing is expected to accommodate around 24,000 vehicles per hour. On the Bur Dubai side the bridge will also connect with a new underpass near Rashid Hospital, while on the Deira side it will be linked with Al Ittihad Road for motorists travelling to Sharjah.

== See also ==
- Sheikh Rashid bin Saeed Crossing
- List of bridges and tunnels in Dubai
