= History of Dubai =

The earliest written record of Dubai (Dibei) is accredited to Muhammad al-Idrisi, who mapped the coast of the UAE in the twelfth century AD. Around 1580, the state jeweler of Venice, Gasparo Balbi, documented the pearling industry of Dubai and other cities currently presiding in UAE territory. Though traditionally conservative, the UAE is one of the most liberal countries in the Gulf, with other cultures and beliefs generally tolerated. Politically it remains authoritarian, however, relations with neighbouring Iran have been tense because of an ongoing territorial dispute over Gulf islands. The UAE was one of only three countries to recognise Taliban rule in Afghanistan.

Before oil was discovered in the 1950s the UAE's economy was dependent on fishing and a declining pearl industry. But since oil exports began in 1962, the country's society and economy have been transformed. The UAE has diversified and has become a regional trading and tourism hub, with UAE firms having invested heavily abroad.

== Early history ==
=== 7000 BCE – 7th Century ===
Records of the area where the emirate and city of Dubai is situated are very rare for any period before the 18th century.

During the expansion of the Sheikh Zayed Road between 1993 and 1998, remnants of a mangrove swamp were uncovered which were dated to approximately 7000 BCE. It is thought that by about 3000 BCE, the coastline had moved seaward sufficiently towards the present-day coastline and the area became covered in sand.

As it became more inhabitable, nomadic cattle herders used the area to live and herd in. The date palm began to be grown locally in 2500 BCE, and was the first instance of the land being used for agricultural purposes. The herders worshipped the god Bajir and various evidence suggests links to the mysterious Magan civilization, who it is thought controlled the copper trade of this part of the ancient world, and of which there are archaeological sites in Bahrain.

For the next about 2000–2700 years there are no more details, probably because of the desertification, insignificance, and remoteness of the area, until the area came part of the "Maka" satrapy, the southernmost satrapy of the Achaemenid Empire, and followed by the Sassanian Empire, the last pre-Islamic Iranian Empire, several hundred years later in the 3rd century CE. Recent excavations of the Jumeirah area of Dubai have unearthed a 6th-century caravan station suggesting the area was sparsely inhabited during this period.

=== 7th century – 19th century ===
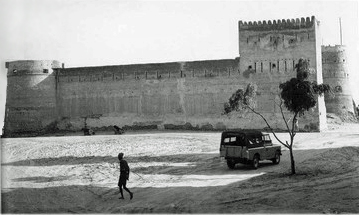
Al Fahidi Fort in Dubai in the late 1950s, built in 1787

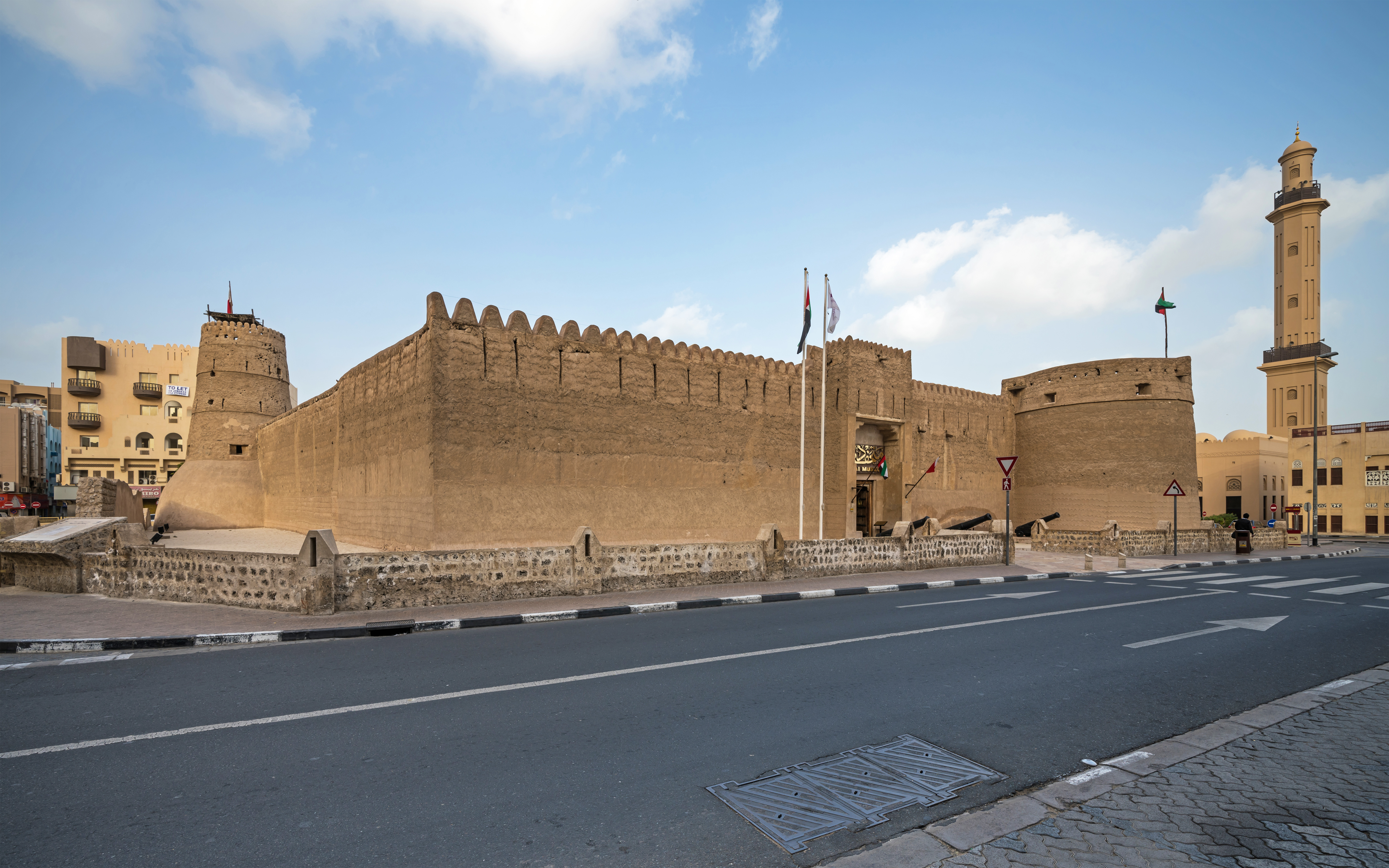
Al Fahidi Fort today. Al Fahidi Fort is the oldest existing building in Dubai.

The Umayyads introduced Islam to the area in the 7th century and sparked the vitalization of the area, opening up trade routes supported by fishing and pearl diving to eastern regions such as modern-day Pakistan and India, with reports of ships travelling as far as China to trade. The earliest written mention of the area of Dubai was in 1095, by Abū 'Ubayd 'Abd Allāh al-Bakrī, in his Mojam Ma Ostojam men Asmae Al belaad wal Mawadhea, in which he describes many places of the world compiled from other accounts of them. It was not until 1799 that the town had its first record. However, the Venetian Gasparo Balbi, a renowned pearl merchant, mentioned "Dibai" in a list of places he noted for the exceptional quality of their pearls in the year 1590.

== History ==
=== 1800–1966 ===
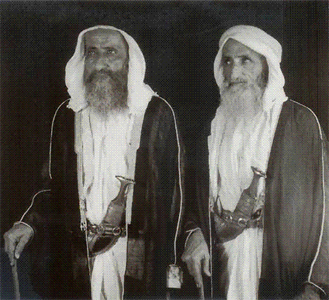
Sheikh Juma Al Maktoum (left) and Sheikh Saeed bin Maktoum Al Maktoum (right) of the Maktoum family

==== 1800–1912 ====
In the early 19th century, the Al Abu Falasa dynasty (part of the House of Al-Falasi) of the Bani Yas tribe established Dubai, which remained a dependent of Abu Dhabi until 1833. On 8 January 1820, the Sheikh of Dubai and other sheikhs in the region signed the "General Maritime Peace Treaty" with the British government, which aimed to suppress piracy in the region and was the first formal denunciation of the Arab slave trade in Emirati history. However, in 1833 the Al Maktoum dynasty (also descendants of the House of Al-Falasi) of the Bani Yas tribe left the settlement of Abu Dhabi and took over Dubai from the Abu Falasa clan without resistance, led by Maktoum bin Butti, the founder of the present day al-Maktoum dynasty. In 1841 the town was hit by a devastating smallpox outbreak which forced many to relocate east to the town of Deira, Dubai.

In 1853, in an attempt to further halt the endemic piracy in the region, the British signed another truce, agreeing to stay out of administration of the region in return for the sheikhs agreeing to suppress piracy. This also had the side effect of the area becoming known as the Trucial States. In 1894 a fire swept through Deira, burning down most of the homes; however, perfect geographical positioning and thriving business enabled the rebuilding of the city. The success of the area led Sheikh Maktoum to sign an exclusive business deal with the British in 1892, making Dubai a British protectorate, and in 1894 granted full tax exemption for all foreign traders. By 1903, the Sheikh had succeeded in convincing a major British steamship line to make Dubai a port of call. Merchants from Lingah looked across to the Arab shore of the Persian Gulf finally making their homes in Dubai. They continued to trade with Lingah, however, as do many of the dhows in Dubai Creek today, and they named their district Bastakiya, after the Bastak region in southern Persia. At this time, almost a quarter of the population was of non-Emirati origin.

==== 1912–1944 ====
After various rulers, Sheikh Saeed bin Maktoum bin Hasher Al Maktoum who became Ruler in 1912, was the first Ruler to rule for a substantial period of time and is regarded by many as one of the fathers of Dubai. The times of prosperity thanks to the pearl industry continued solidly through until the Great Depression of 1929. The emergence of artificial pearls had begun to hit the economy of Dubai, and coupled with the effects of the depression caused the Sheikh to explore other opportunities for expansion. In 1929, he was briefly deposed and succeeded by Sheikh Mani bin Rashid, a relative; however, three days later he was restored to the throne and ruled until his death. This resulted in the emergence of Dubai as the premier re-export business port, whereby goods are imported into a duty-free port and immediately exported to another market.

Dubai has the main entrepôt in the Persian Gulf and the busiest trading port since 1900, with commerce being the main source of revenue for the emirate. The merchant class in Dubai played a key role in restructuring the economy and government decision-making in the pre-oil era of Dubai's development. Today merchants play a fundamental role in economic affairs and the political structure. In addition, again they have taken on roles as service suppliers, urban planners, culture mediators, and internationalists representing the region throughout the world.

Dubai suffered economically after 1920 due to the collapse of the pearl industry, the Great Depression of the 1930s, and the loss of extensive trade networks during World War II. Until the surge of oil revenues in the late 1960s, political instability and merchant unrest existed and constituted an organized attempt to subvert British influence and the ruling Al-Maktoum family. The uprising of 1938 in Dubai was the culmination of a decade of grievances and minor rebellions against the autocratic rule of Shaykh Sa'id bin Maktum (ruled 1912–58). In the 1930s the Trucial Coast was characterized by great poverty resulting primarily from a decline in the pearl trade. Much of the initiative for reform sprang from an attempt to ameliorate economic conditions—the leaders of the movement having previously been successful pearl merchants. The new government established in October 1938 lasted only a few months before Shaykh Sa'id with Bedouin support was able to overthrow it in March 1939. The reform movement ultimately collapsed due to opposition from the British government and the weakness of the political structures then in place.

==== 1945–1958 ====
A dispute between Dubai and Abu Dhabi regarding their border escalated into armed conflict between the two states, with Dubai attacking a number of Abu Dhabi towns in the country's interior. Arbitration by the British government in 1949 resulted in the creation of a buffer frontier running south eastwards from the coast at Ras Hasian. A formal compromise was not reached until 1979, eight years after the creation of the UAE.

==== 1958–1966 ====
In 1958, upon the death of Saeed bin Maktoum Al Maktoum, Sheikh Rashid bin Saeed Al Maktoum became Ruler. Rashid al Maktoum is widely regarded as the driving force behind the expansion of Dubai, causing its massive expansion, with the aid of the discovery of oil. He embarked on a dredging of Dubai Creek in 1963, as the creek was too small for modern ships to dock there, which caused severe negative economic effects. He borrowed huge amounts of money to pull off the dredging, which was highly risky as the money necessary to complete it was far higher than Dubai's annual income. The dredging was a success, which enabled vessels of any size to dock at the port. This caused the gold re-export market to take off, and ensuring Rashid was able to begin the building of vital infrastructure in partnership with the British. Since the beginning, Dubai was constantly at odds with Abu Dhabi. In 1947, a border dispute between Dubai and Abu Dhabi on their northern border erupted into war between the two states and forced the involvement of the British government and the subsequent creation of a buffer zone which resulted in a temporary ceasefire. However, border disputes between the emirates continued even after the formation of the UAE and it was only in 1979 that a formal compromise was reached that ended hostilities between the two states, by allowing Abu Dhabi the control of the rest of the UAE, while leaving Dubai to rule many of its own affairs, especially when related to trade.

=== 1966–present day ===
==== Discovery of oil ====
The major turning point in the history and fortunes of Dubai was the discovery of oil in 1966. Coupled with the joining of the newly independent country of Qatar and Dubai to create a new currency, the Riyal, after the devaluation of the Persian Gulf rupee which had been issued by the Government of India, it enabled Dubai to rapidly expand and grow. Once the first shipment of oil was made in 1969, the future of Dubai as an autonomous state was secured, and its ability to dictate policy in later years to the UAE was cemented.

==== Formation of the UAE ====
Britain left the Persian Gulf in the early part of 1971, having announced their intentions in 1968, causing Dubai and Abu-Dhabi, in conjunction with five other emirates to form the United Arab Emirates. Dubai and Abu-Dhabi ensured in the negotiations that between them they could control the country effectively, enabling even greater expansion as seen today. In 1973, Dubai joined the other emirates, in introducing the UAE dirham, the uniform currency of the UAE. Dubai and Abu Dhabi between them now hold the majority of control in the UAE, which was part of their conditions for joining. To enable this, Abu Dhabi and Dubai are the only emirates who have veto power over matters of national importance, whereas the other emirates only have a vote on such matters. In addition to this, Dubai is represented by eight members on the Federal National Council, of whom there are forty in total. Dubai and Ras al Khaimah are the only two states who retain their own judicial courts, whilst the others are part of the federal justice system of the UAE. The Jebel Ali Free Zone was introduced in 1979, providing companies with unrestricted import of labour and export of capital, which helped to jumpstart the influx of global companies seen today.

==== 1990–present day ====
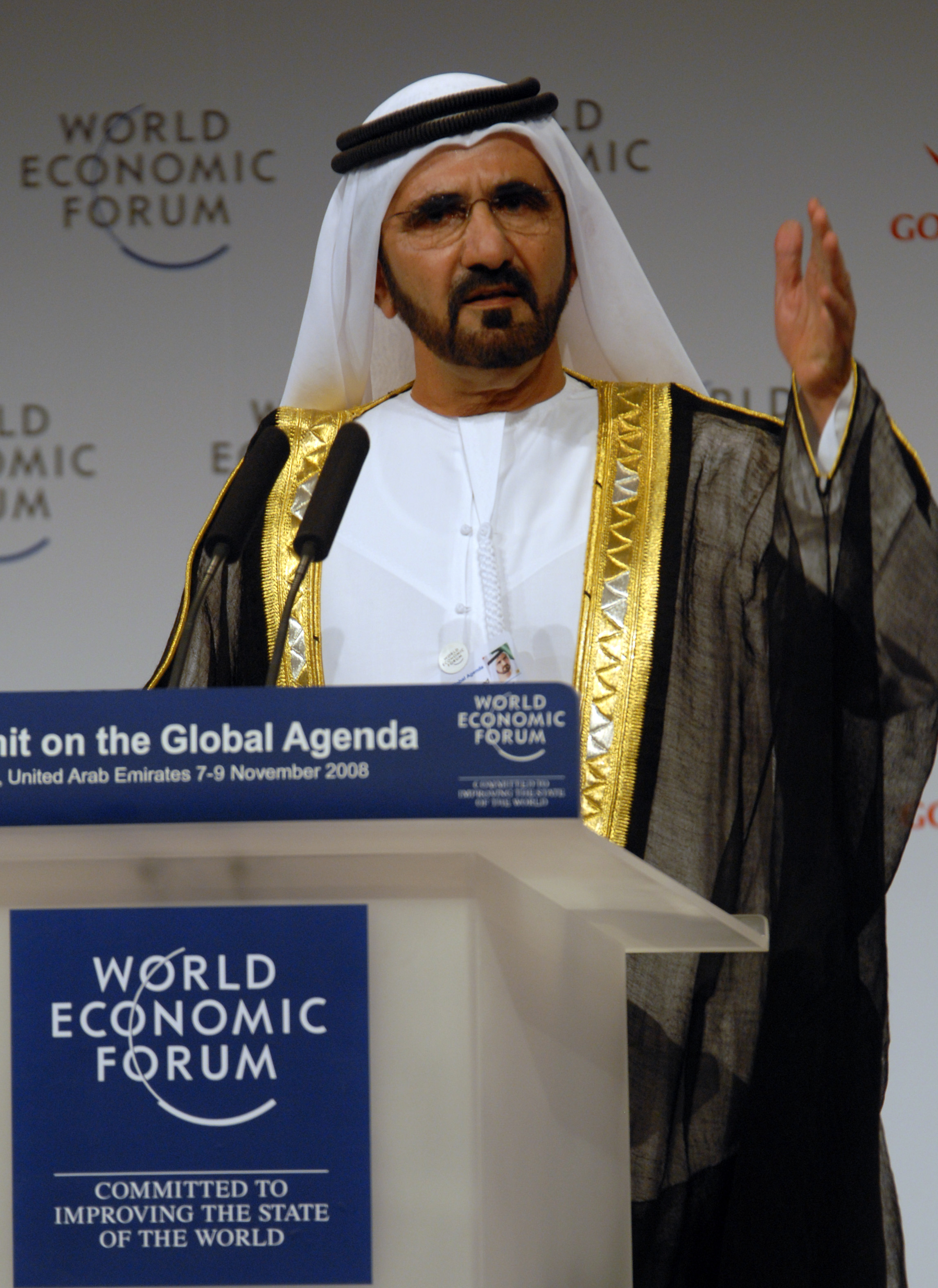
The current Emir, Mohammed bin Rashid Al Maktoum

The death of Sheikh Rashid al-Maktoum resulted in Sheikh Maktoum bin Rashid Al Maktoum to the throne. The Persian Gulf War of 1990, in which Dubai as part of the UAE provided military aid to the coalition, unsettled the economy; however, in the mid-1990s this stabilised and many foreign trading communities moved their businesses to Dubai. Dubai continued to foster political alignment with the western world, and during the 2003 Invasion of Iraq, they provided refueling bases to allied forces in the Jebel Ali Free Zone as they did during the Persian Gulf War.

Global increases in oil prices allowed Dubai to focus on rapid development of key infrastructure. The success of the Jebel Ali free zone caused the development of clusters of new free zones, including Dubai Internet City, an internet technology area with ownership and tax related benefits, Dubai Media City, a tax-free zone to increase Dubai's presence in the worldwide media, and Dubai Maritime City, which will have many facilities, including waterfronts and harbours. In the past decades, Dubai has become known for its successful building projects, including the Burj Al Arab, the world's tallest freestanding hotel, The Palm Islands, a construction of three artificial islands in the shape of the date palm, on which residential and commercial property will be built and The World Islands, a massive man-made archipelago of 300 islands in the shape of the world, and Burj Khalifa, which is the world's tallest man-made structure. In 2006, upon the death of Sheikh Maktoum al-Maktoum, his brother, Sheikh Mohammed bin Rashid al-Maktoum became Emir, having been de facto ruler for a decade and credited with helping to force Dubai's rapid expansion.

The Great Recession of the late 2000s hit the economy of Dubai extremely hard; this was largely due to its dependence on sectors such as energy, tourism and especially real-estate, with reports of new construction slowing and in some cases stopping altogether. In an effort to combat the recession, Dubai announced various tax cutting measures to incentivise businesses in the region.

Dubai has also been in the news for its attitudes towards adultery, which are seen as harsh in the Western world, with some cases forcing the intervention of other governments on behalf of their citizens. To keep attract foreign investors, the United Arab Emirates plans to decriminalize "actions that don't harm others," potentially ending punishments for alcohol consumption or cohabitation by unwed couples in the expatriate-dominated country.

In February and March 2026, Dubai was impacted by missile and drone strikes launched by Iran as part of a regional escalation following hostilities between the United States, Israel and Iran. Explosions were reported on Palm Jumeirah and other areas of Dubai. Incoming missiles were intercepted by air defense systems, but debris and explosions caused panic among residents and tourists. The city, lacking air-raid shelters and a formal response system, saw many residents relying on social media for information. On 28 February 2026, Fairmont The Palm hotel in Dubai was set ablaze after debris from an Iranian missile strike hit the area, injuring four people. On March 1, 2026, Dubai's international airport and the Burj Al Arab hotel were damaged in Iranian attacks, which also caused a fire at Jebel Ali Port and resulted in four injuries at the airport, while a drone intercepted over the city caused minor damage to the hotel's facade.

== Future ==
Despite the international turmoil over the cost of oil, Dubai is already considered to be the Hong Kong of the Middle East.

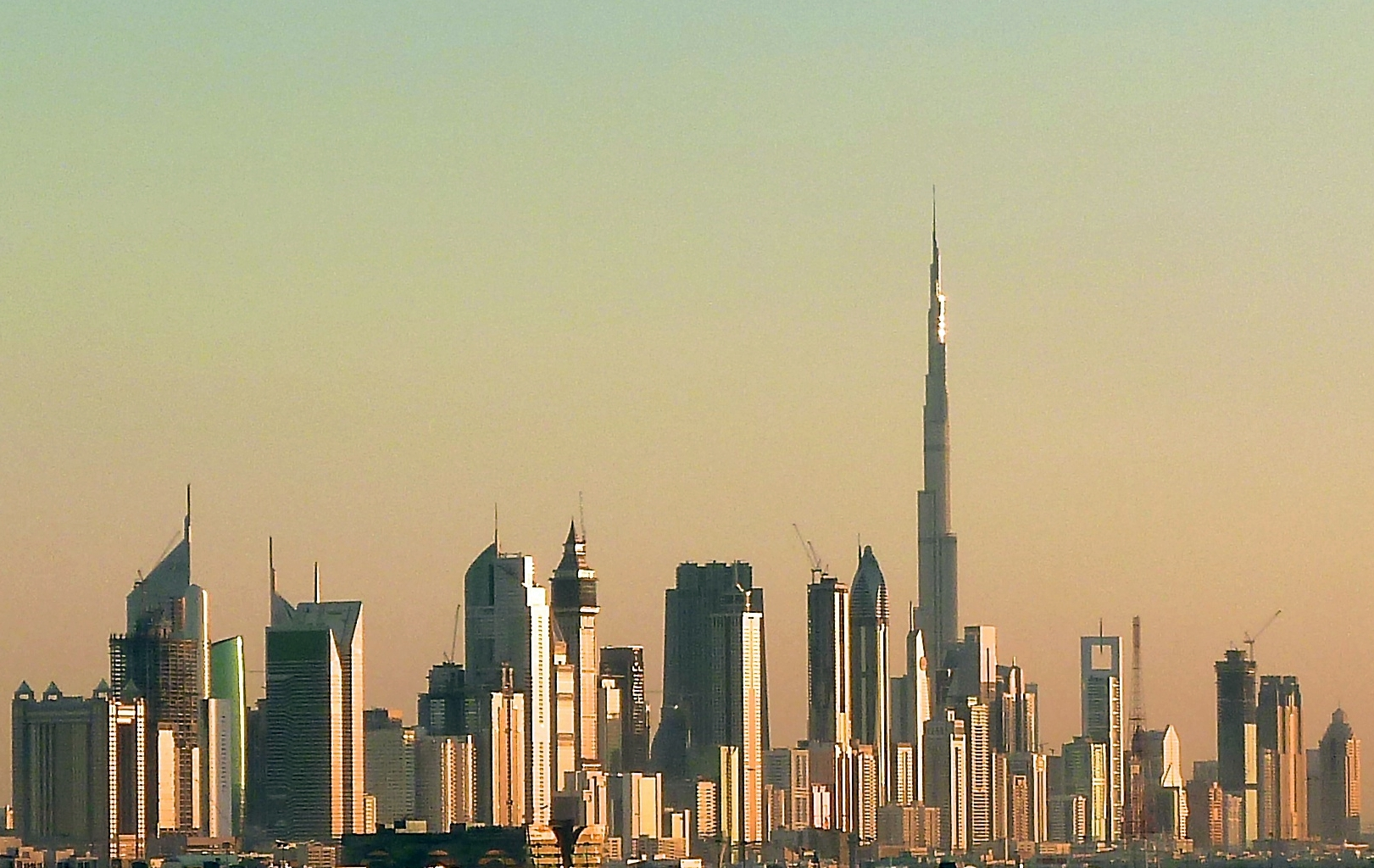
Dubai skyline, 2010

During the 21st century, Dubai may have to implement policies that move away from globalization and toward localization to conserve their energy resources, provide local jobs to citizens of the United Arab Emirates instead of foreign citizens, and maintain their local decision-making authority. Zoning policies would be adjusted by Dubai's municipal government to promote resource conservation and eliminate sprawl.

The last remaining oil deposits in the United Arab Emirates will run out at the end of 2029.. As of February 2006, Dubai (along with the rest of the United Arab Emirates) only has a reserve supply of 44 billion barrels of crude petroleum. If used properly and in conjunction with alternate fuels, the reserve fuels that will keep economy activity afloat in Dubai will last until the end of the 21st century.

== Disputes ==
In addition to the long running dispute between Abu-Dhabi and Dubai, Dubai was also involved in a dispute with Sharjah with regards to their legal boundaries. Before the British left, there were no exact boundaries defined between the Trucial States; however, with the discovery of oil needing boundaries to be decided for concession reasons, Britain was required to define the boundaries. After Julian Walker, a British official (later the British political agent) had surveyed the area, Mr. Tripp, the British political agent, made declarations between 1956 and 1957 defining the boundaries. Although the rulers of both Dubai and Sharjah had agreed in 1954 to accept the rulings made, Dubai's ruler declined to accept the decision. Even after the formation of the UAE, neither state had agreed on the boundaries and hence, on 30 November 1976 they signed an arbitration compromise under the auspices of the Supreme Council of the Federation. Eventually, the Supreme Council ruled that the decisions were administrative, binding decisions as opposed to arbitral awards, the Tripp boundaries were defined as the border.

== Rulers of Dubai ==
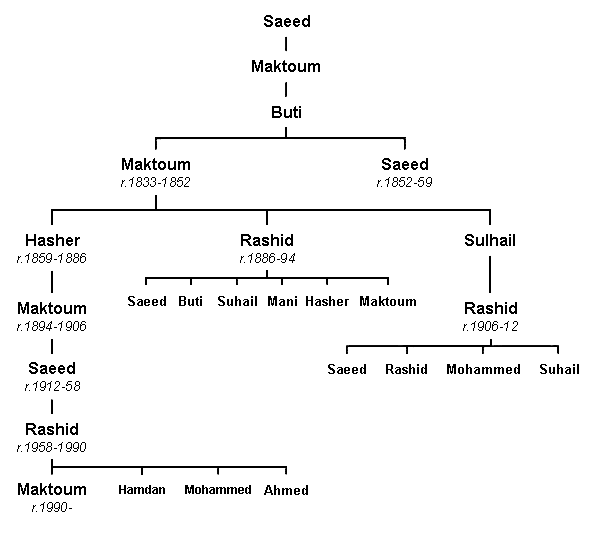
A simplified family tree of the al-Maktoum family

The following is a list of rulers of Dubai, Al-Maktoum dynasty, going back at least to 1833.

- ? – 9 June 1833 Sheikh `Ubayd ibn Said
- 9 June 1833 – 1852 Sheikh Maktoum I bin Bati ibn Suhayl (d. 1852)
- 1852 – 1859 Sheikh Said I ibn Bati (d. 1859)
- 1859 – 22 November 1886 Sheikh Hushur ibn Maktoum (d. 1886)
- 22 November 1886 – 7 April 1894 Sheikh Rashid I bin Maktoum (d. 1894)
- 7 April 1894 – 16 February 1906 Sheikh Maktoum II bin Hushur (b. 18?? – d. 1906)
- 16 February 1906 – November 1912 Sheikh Bati bin Suhayl (b. 1851 – d. 1912)
- November 1912 – 15 April 1929 Sheikh Saeed II bin Maktum (1st time) (b. 1878 – d. 1958)
- 15 April 1929 – 18 April 1929 Sheikh Mani bin Rashid
- 18 April 1929 – September 1958 Sheikh Saeed II bin Maktum (2nd time)
- September 1958 – 7 October 1990 Sheikh Rashid II ibn Said Al Maktoum (b. 1912 – d. 1990)
- 7 October 1990 – 4 January 2006 Sheikh Maktoum III bin Rashid Al Maktoum (b. 1943 – d. 2006)
- 4 January 2006–Present Sheikh Mohammed bin Rashid Al Maktoum (b. 1949)

The current ruler of Dubai is Sheikh Mohammed bin Rashid Al Maktoum. Like his predecessor, Sheikh Maktoum bin Rashid Al Maktoum, he is also the Vice President and the Prime Minister of the UAE. Having attended school in the United Kingdom, he became part of the everyday running of the country. He has two wives, Sheikha Hind bint Maktoum bin Juma Al Maktoum and Princess Haya bint Al Hussein, the daughter of the King of Jordan. He is widely known for being involved with horse-racing and his charitable donations, along with his credit for advancing Dubai's infrastructure and economy.

== See also ==
- Timeline of Dubai

== Bibliography ==
- Abbott, Lucy M. "The States of the Persian Gulf: From protectorates to independent countries." in Routledge Handbook Of Persian Gulf Politics (Routledge, 2020) pp. 48–54.
- Bagaeen, Samer. "Brand Dubai: The instant city; or the instantly recognizable city." International Planning Studies 12.2 (2007): 173-197. online
- Biln, John. "On The Fabrication of Cultural Memory: History Theme Malls in Dubai." Journal of Islamic Architecture 4.1 (2016): 27-32. online
- Botz-Bornstein, Thorsten. "A tale of two cities: Hong Kong and Dubai celebration of disappearance and the pretension of becoming." Transcience 3.2 (2012): 1-16. online
- Davidson, Christopher M. Dubai: The Vulnerability of Success (2008) excerpt
- Davidson, Christopher M. "Arab Nationalism and British Opposition in Dubai, 1920–66." Middle Eastern Studies 43.6 (2007): 879-892.
- Davidson, Christopher M. Abu Dhabi: oil and beyond (Columbia University Press, 2009).
- Elsheshtawy, Yasser. Dubai: Behind an urban spectacle (Routledge, 2009).
- Kanna, Ahmed. Dubai, the City as Corporation (2011)
- Krance, Jim. City of Gold: Dubai and the Dream of Capitalism (2010) excerpt
- Pelican, Michaela. "Urban lifeworlds of Cameroonian migrants in Dubai." Urban Anthropology and Studies of Cultural Systems and World Economic Development (2014): 255-309
- Schulte-Peevers, Andrea and Kevin Raub. Lonely Planet Dubai & Abu Dhabi (2018) excerpt
- Vora, Neha. "From golden frontier to global city: Shifting forms of belonging, 'freedom,' and governance among Indian businessmen in Dubai." American Anthropologist 113.2 (2011): 306-318.
- Vora, Neha, Impossible Citizens: Dubai's Indian Diaspora (2013) excerpt
- Zahlan, Rosemarie Said. The origins of the United Arab Emirates: A political and social history of the Trucial States (Routledge, 2016).
- Ziadah, Rafeef. "Transport Infrastructure and Logistics in the Making of Dubai Inc." International Journal of Urban & Regional Research (2018) 42#2 pp 182–197.
