= 1987 in the United Arab Emirates =

- Decades: 1970s; 1980s; 1990s; 2000s
- See also: Other events of 1987; Timeline of Emirati history

Events from the year 1987 in the United Arab Emirates.

== Incumbents ==
- President: Zayed bin Sultan Al Nahyan.
- Prime Minister: Rashid bin Saeed Al Maktoum.

== Births ==
- 11 January - Rosil Al Azawi.
- 22 June - Khalid Sebil Lashkari.
