= 1972 in the United Arab Emirates =

- Decades: 1970s; 1980s; 1990s
- See also: Other events of 1972; Timeline of Emirati history

The following lists events that happened during 1972 in the United Arab Emirates.

== Incumbents ==
- President: Zayed bin Sultan Al Nahyan
- Prime Minister: Maktoum bin Rashid Al Maktoum

== Events ==
=== January ===
- January 24 - A month after bringing the Emirate of Sharjah into the United Arab Emirates, the emir, Khalid bin Mohammed Al Qasimi was assassinated in a coup attempt by the previous ruler, Saqr bin Sultan al-Qasimi, whom Khalid had overthrown in 1965. Saqr failed to regain the throne, and Sharjah has been ruled since then by Khalid's brother, Sultan bin Muhammad Al-Qasimi.

=== February ===
- February 9 - The seventh sheikhdom, Ras al-Khaimah, joins the United Arab Emirates.

=== March ===
- March 14 - Sterling Airways Flight 267, which was bringing Danish vacationers home from a holiday in Sri Lanka, crashed on its approach to the Dubai airport. All 112 people on board were killed.
