= 1980 in the United Arab Emirates =

- Decades: 1970s; 1980s; 1990s; 2000s
- See also: Other events of 1980; Timeline of Emirati history

Events from the year 1980 in the United Arab Emirates.

== Incumbents ==
- President: Zayed bin Sultan Al Nahyan
- Prime Minister: Rashid bin Saeed Al Maktoum

== Establishments ==
- Al Bayan.
