= 1989 in the United Arab Emirates =

- Decades: 1970s; 1980s; 1990s; 2000s
- See also: Other events of 1989; Timeline of Emirati history

Events from the year 1989 in the United Arab Emirates.

== Incumbents ==
- President: Zayed bin Sultan Al Nahyan
- Prime Minister: Rashid bin Saeed Al Maktoum

== Births ==
- 18 January - Sultan Bargash
- 23 March - Josh Dela Cruz
- 16 April - Mohamed Ahmed
