= Al Worood Academy =

Location
- Abu Dhabi; UAE
- Coordinates: 24.49065°N 54.36651°E

Information
- Type: Private K-12 school
- Established: June 1982
- Closed: September 1, 2015.

Al Worood Academy was an English-medium private K-12 school that was established in Abu Dhabi, UAE in June 1982. The majority of students are Arab and Muslim. The School located in the Muroor suburb of Abu Dhabi has approximately over 2000 students. Al Worood offers the following qualifications to high-school students: Cambridge IGCSE and Edexcel A-Levels; and is a center for the SAT and TOEFL tests.

The Abu Dhabi Education council (ADEC) ordered the closure of school after the incident of death of a three-year-old girl in a school bus. The court ordered punishment to all guilty persons and school administration under Laws of the UAE. In final verdict, the school was allowed to continue, but ADEC official did not want Al-Worood to continue as an educational institution. It was finally closed by ADEC on September 1, 2015.
