= Dana Group =

- Company type: Privately Held
- Industry: Mechanical and Industrial Engineering
- Founded: May 1, 1991 Dubai, UAE
- Founder: Dr Birbal Singh Dana
- Headquarters: Dubai, UAE
- Number of employees: 501-1000 employees
- Parent: DANA Groups
- Website: www.danagroups.com

Dana Group is a group of companies in the global steel industry, founded by Birbal Singh Dana in 1991. It is known as a manufacturing hub for steel and automotive lubricants. The company has its headquarters in the UAE and has branches, offices, and manufacturing facilities located in India, Qatar, and Libya.

== History ==
In 1991, Dr. Birbal Singh Dana, a surgeon by trade, left the University Hospital of Libya for Dubai and established Dana Group. Since then, Dana Group has grown to over 500 employees. In the financial year of 2004 to 2005, Dana Group had an annual turnover of 500 Million and since then there has been a substantial growth each year.

As of 2014, Dana Group is one of the largest international trading companies of steel, stainless steel, aluminium and other metals.
