= 1990 in the United Arab Emirates =

- Decades: 1970s; 1980s; 1990s; 2000s; 2010s
- See also: Other events of 1990; Timeline of Emirati history

Events from the year 1990 in the United Arab Emirates.

== Incumbents ==
- President: Zayed bin Sultan Al Nahyan
- Prime Minister: Rashid bin Saeed Al Maktoum (until 7 October), Maktoum bin Rashid Al Maktoum (starting 7 October)

== Events ==
- Maktoum bin Rashid Al Maktoum became Prime Minister of the country.
