= 1983 in the United Arab Emirates =

- Decades: 1970s; 1980s; 1990s; 2000s
- See also: Other events of 1983; Timeline of Emirati history

The following lists events that happened during 1983 in the United Arab Emirates.

== Incumbents ==
- President: Zayed bin Sultan Al Nahyan
- Prime Minister: Rashid bin Saeed Al Maktoum

== Events ==
=== September ===
- September 23 1983 - A bomb explodes on Gulf Air Flight 771, killing all 112 people on board.
