= 1995 in the United Arab Emirates =

- Decades: 1970s; 1980s; 1990s; 2000s; 2010s
- See also: Other events of 1995; Timeline of Emirati history

Events from the year 1995 in the United Arab Emirates.

== Incumbents ==
- President: Zayed bin Sultan Al Nahyan
- Prime Minister: Maktoum bin Rashid Al Maktoum

== Establishments ==
- Wafi City.

== Births ==
- March 3 – Zahra Lari, figure skater
