= Shuraa =

Privately held company

Shuraa Management & Consultancy
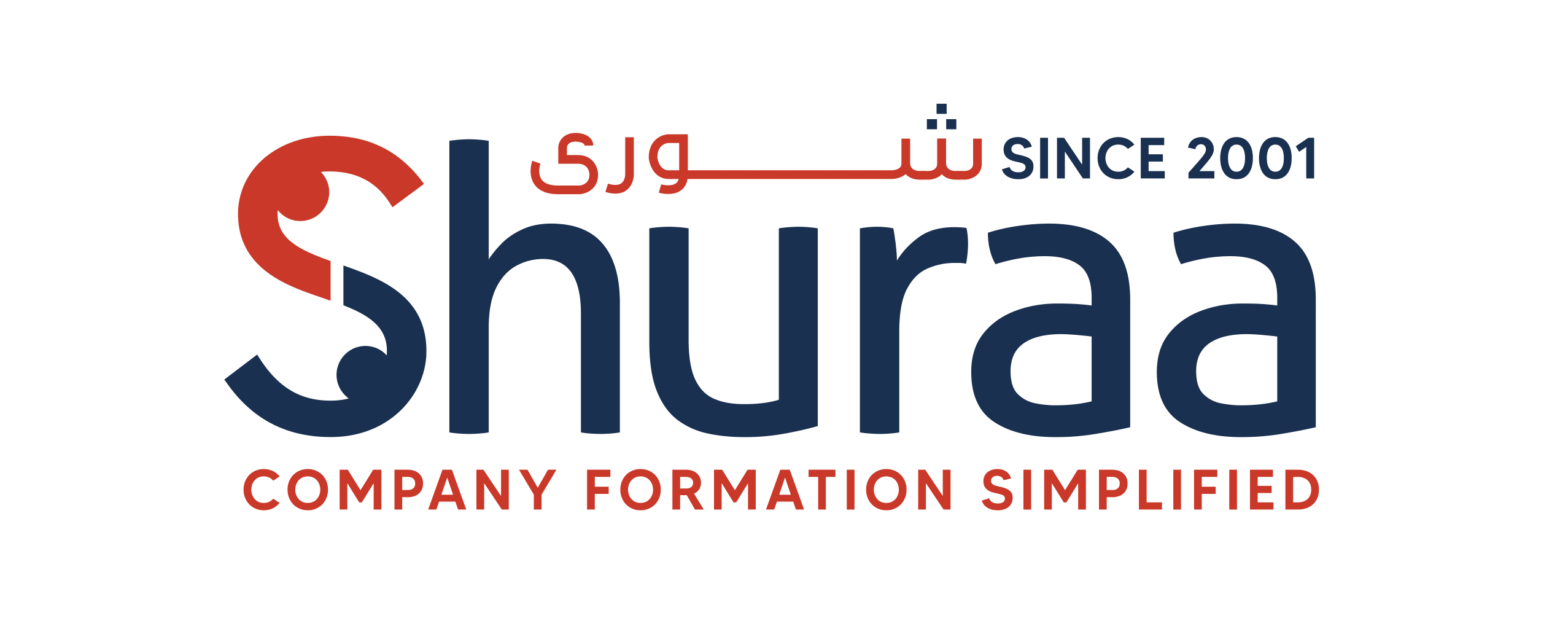
- Type: Private
- Industry: Business services
- Founded: September 23, 2001; 25 years ago
- Founder: Saeed Khalifa Mohammed Al Fuqaei
- Headquarters: Dubai, United Arab Emirates
- Area served: United Arab Emirates; international (London, Amsterdam, Munich, Delhi)
- Services: Company formation; licensing; visa and PRO services; office services; tax and accounting; banking; corporate consulting; education counselling; health and wellness services
- Number of employees: 300 (2025)
- Website: www.shuraa.com

Shuraa Management & Consultancy (commonly known as Shuraa) is a private business services group headquartered in Dubai, United Arab Emirates. The company specialises in company formation, licensing, visa and PRO services, office services, financial and compliance services, and a range of value‑added offerings.

== History ==
Shuraa Management & Consultancy was founded in 2001 by the Emirati entrepreneur Saeed Khalifa Mohammed Al Fuqaei.

By 2010, Shuraa had opened its first dedicated business centres on Sheikh Zayed Road and in Al Karama, Dubai. In 2013, the company launched the Investor's Right Protection Contract to enhance client transparency and security. In 2017, Shuraa opened two additional business centres in Business Bay, Dubai. On 30 July 2018, the company received the "World's Greatest Brands & Leaders Asia & GCC 2017–18" award .

In 2019, Shuraa founded Shuraa Tax, a new division offering accounting, tax, auditing, and corporate finance services, and in November of that year featured in the UK Embassy's "UAE 2019: Accelerating Tomorrow" magazine. In 2020, Shahid Rather was appointed Managing Partner, under whose leadership revenue grew fourfold and regional hubs opened in London and Amsterdam. The group launched Shuraa Education in Delhi in 2023 to provide international student counselling and visa assistance.

On 26 December 2023, Shuraa established its 4,000th company in Dubai. In 2025, it diversified into health and wellness with the opening of Amara Aesthetics Studio under Shuraa Medical Center in Dubai.

== Services ==
Shuraa provides a full suite of business services in the UAE and internationally. Its company formation and licensing offerings include mainland, free zone, and offshore setups, trade-name reservation, legal-structure advisory, and licence procurement. The firm's visa and PRO services cover investor, partner, employee, and Golden Visas, as well as Emirates ID processing and government liaison. Financial and compliance services encompass bank account setup, VAT and corporate tax assistance, bookkeeping, audits, and AML compliance. Additionally, Shuraa offers value‑added services such as local sponsorship, investor‑rights contracts, intellectual property filing, recruitment, marketing, branding, and corporate restructuring.
