= Floating Bridge, Dubai =

Floating Bridge الجسر العائم
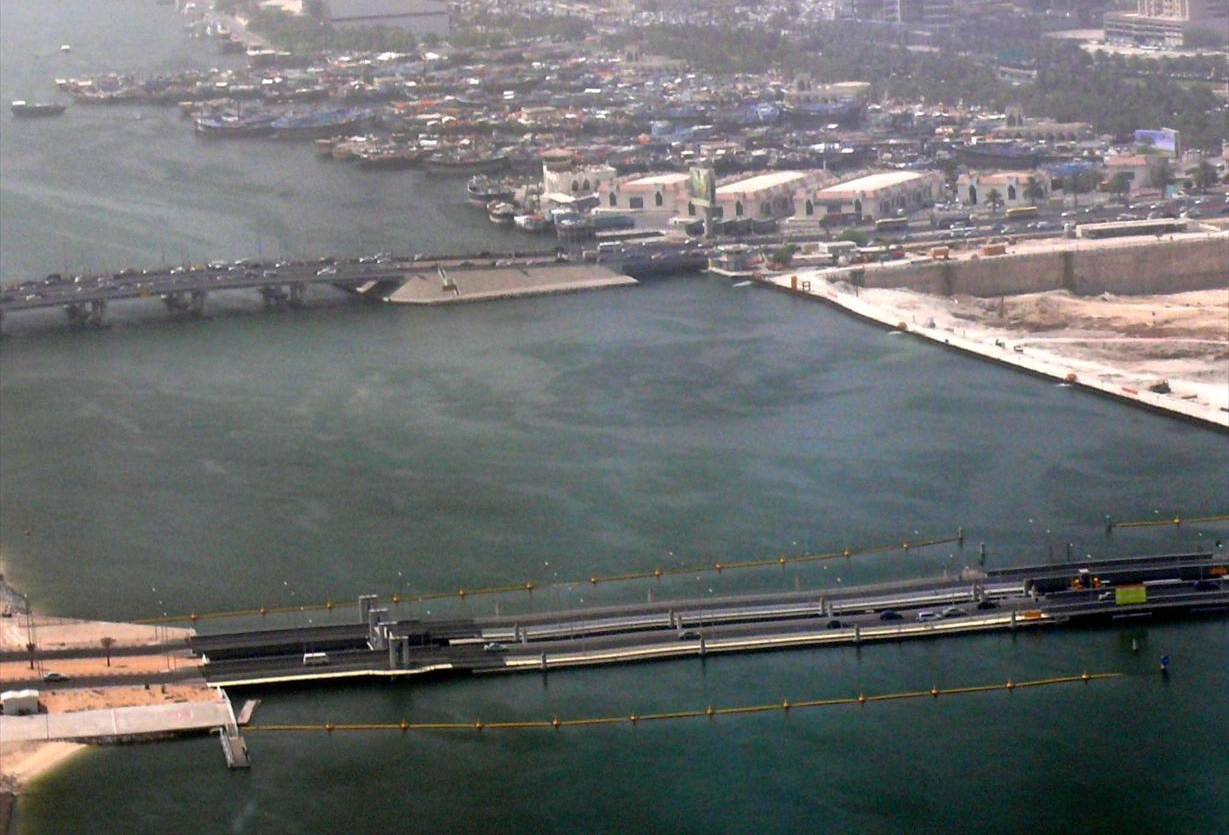
- Aerial view of the floating bridge
- Coordinates: 25.2489°N 55.3259°E
- Carries: Pedestrian and Vehicle
- Locale: Dubai, United Arab Emirates

Characteristics
- Design: Pontoon bridge
- Material: Concrete
- Trough construction: Steel
- Total length: 365 metres
- Width: 22 metres

History
- Constructed by: Waagner Biro Gulf
- Construction cost: DH 155 million (US$42 million)
- Opened: 16 July 2007
- Inaugurated: 15 July 2007

Floating Bridge (Arabic: الجسر العائم) is a pontoon bridge located in Dubai, United Arab Emirates. The bridge is the first of its kind in the region and was built to try to reduce traffic congestion on the Al Garhoud and Al Maktoum Bridges. The Floating Bridge is the fifth crossing on Dubai Creek, the others being Al Shindagha Tunnel, Al Maktoum Bridge, Al Garhoud Bridge, Infinity Bridge and Business Bay Crossing.

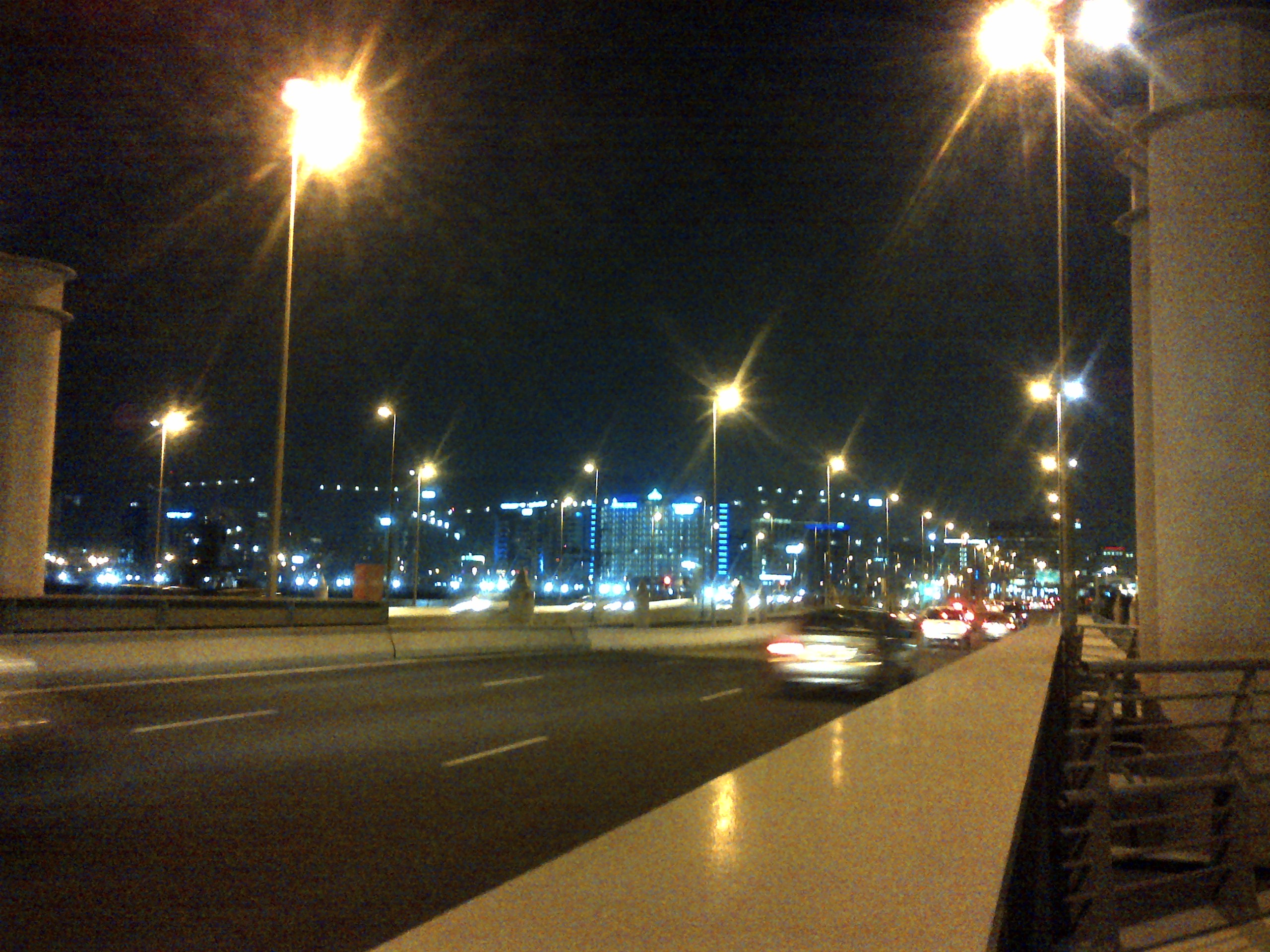
The Floating Bridge taken at night with several Deira buildings in the background

== Construction ==
The Floating Bridge was ordered by Sheikh Mohammed bin Rashid Al Maktoum and subsequently completed by the Dubai Roads and Transport Authority. The bridge was commissioned on 15 July 2007 and cost DH 155 million (US$42 million) to build. It has the capacity to hold 6,000 vehicles an hour. The bridge also serves as an alternative route for Al Maktoum Bridge, where Salik was recently implemented.

The construction of the floating bridge faced several technical challenges due to the unique conditions of Dubai Creek. These challenges included ensuring stability of the floating pontoons, accommodating traffic loads and wave action, and maintaining navigation channels.

Waagner Biro Gulf, a subsidiary of Waagner-Biro Stahibau AG was given the contract to construct the floating bridge. The bridge is 22 meters wide and 365 meters long. The pontoon bridge, located alongside the Floating Bridge, features six lanes on two identical, mirrored decks, spanning Dubai Creek. Independent support structures were constructed to allow the bridge to hold up to 6000 cars each hour.

The parallel structures were designed to accommodate three lanes and one pedestrian foot walk each. Between the two floating pontoons made of concrete, each 115 meters long and 22 meters wide, a hydraulically driven rotating middle section made of steel is positioned to allow undisturbed navigation. To compensate for differences in level as well as for transverse inclinations (heeling) and longitudinal displacements resulting from traffic loads and wave action acting on the ramp, another two rows of 28 transitory elements were installed between the floating pontoons and the transitory ramp on either bank.

The structure was formed dynamically, distributing wave energy and vehicle pressure along the length and width of the platform so that they cancel each other out. Twenty-three standard elements filled with polystyrene plates serve as the floating body supporting the bridge at water level. The bridge was assembled in day and night shifts in 23 days. In total, the time spent on the design, foundation work, installation of the bridge embankments, fabrication, and installation of the steel structures took 10 months. The construction of the floating bridge was completed at a cost of 155 million dirhams (US$42 million) and on 15 July 2007, an inauguration ceremony was held to officially open the floating bridge.

== Operation ==
The bridge, which is part of the Dubai Roads and Transport Authority's strategy to ease traffic congestion in the emirate, is designed to accommodate an estimated 3,000 vehicles in each direction during peak morning and evening hours and hence reduce congestion on Al Maktoum Bridge by around 37%.

The bridge has a fixed operation timing wherein it closes at night to open the partition of the bridge to allow boats and abras to pass through. According to RTA official the Floating Bridge opening will concur with the launch of the water bus service at the Dubai Creek.

The bridge is located half a kilometer south of the Maktoum Bridge and connects Deira and the Oud Metha Road.

There was an announcement that a floating bridge would be constructed to link the two sides of Al Mamzar Beach. This 200-meter pedestrian bridge, to be built directly on the water's surface, is proposed to be the first of its kind in Dubai.

=== Closure ===
On May 22, 2023, Dubai's Roads and Transport Authority (RTA) closed Dubai's Floating Bridge until further notice. The bridge was closed for maintenance, which was then extended.

== Replacement ==
The floating bridge was expected to be a temporary crossing. It was to be replaced by a new bridge called Dubai Smile by 2012, but later Dubai RTA announced that the Floating bridge would be replaced by 12-lane Al Ittihad Bridge. The construction of the Al Ittihad Bridge was expected to be completed in late 2018.

== Image gallery ==
Construction of the Floating Bridge on 31 May 2007

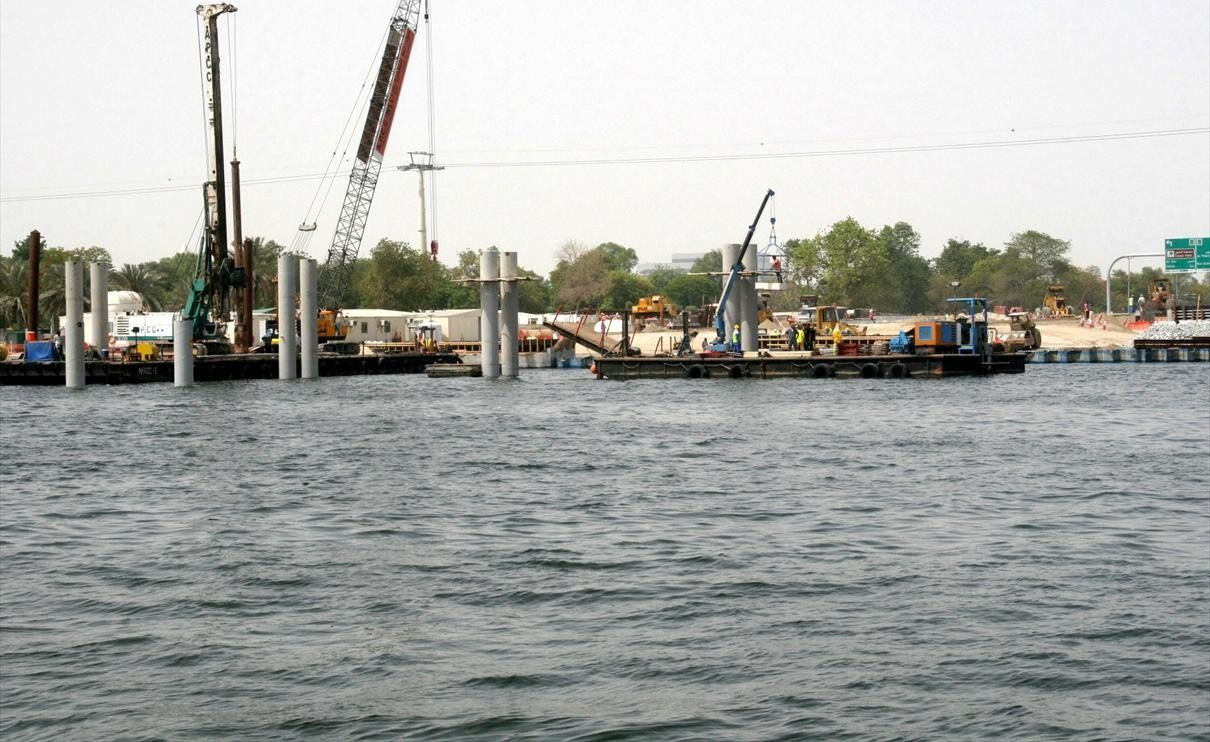

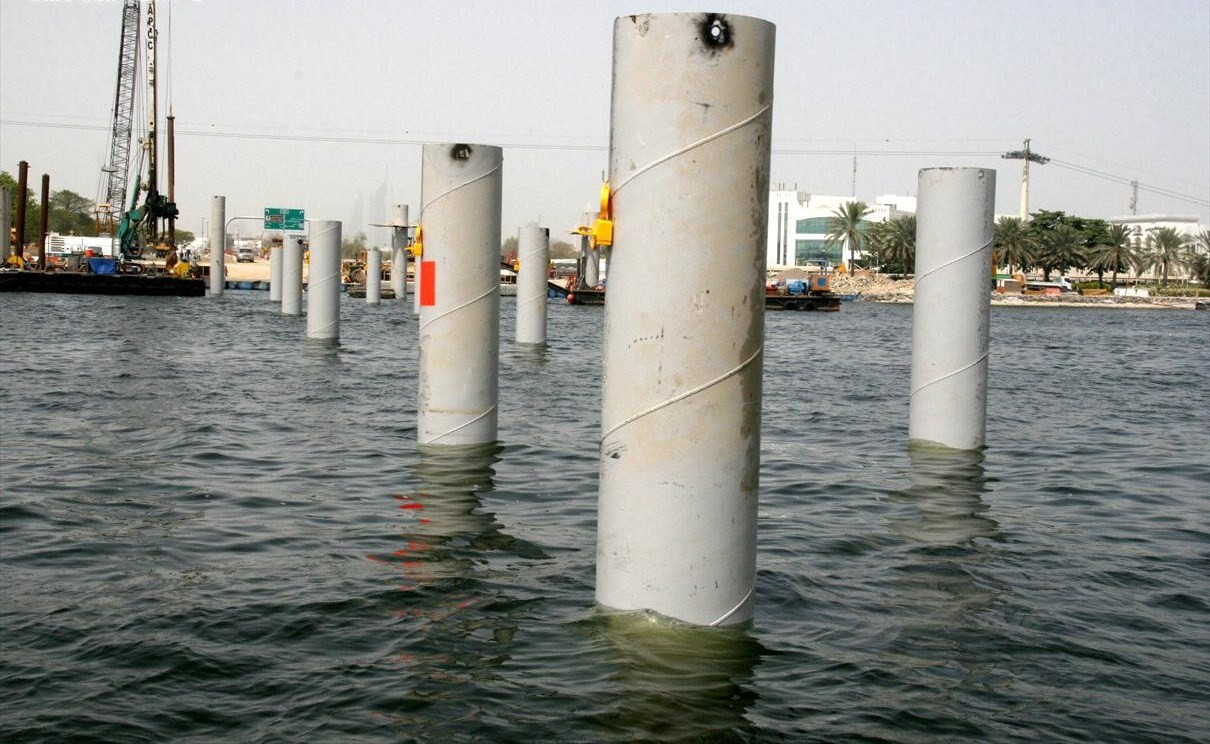

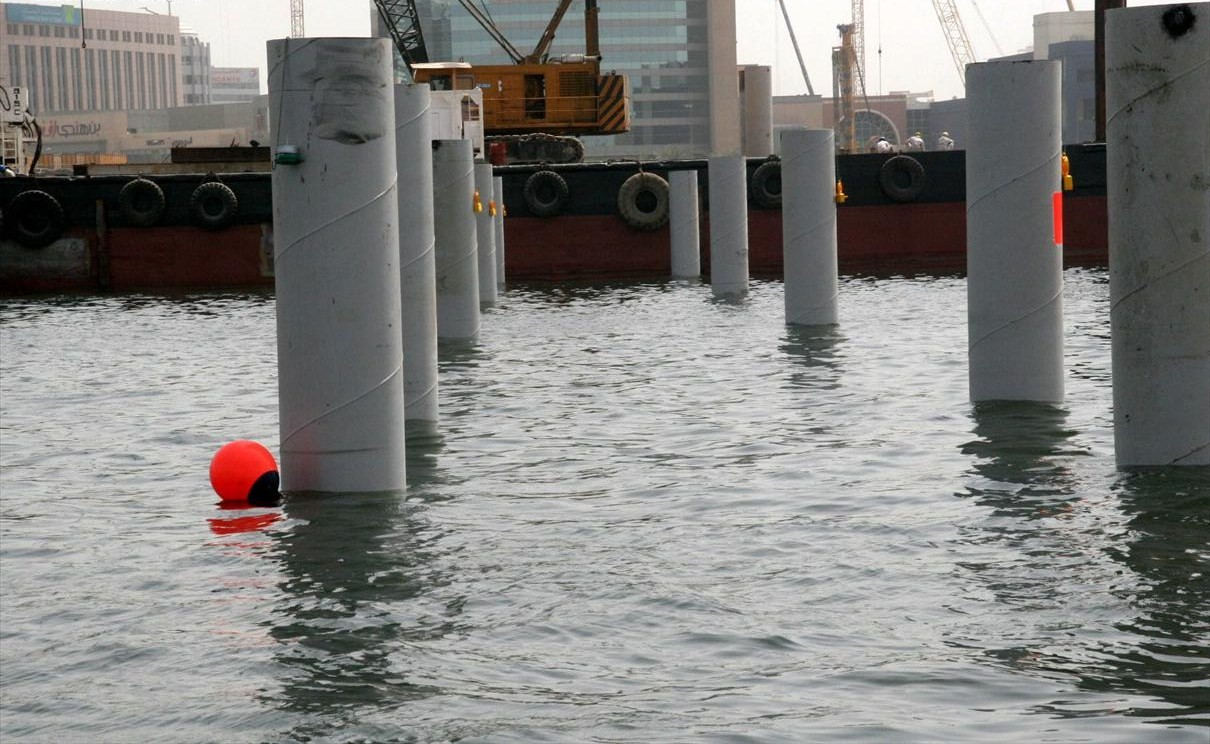

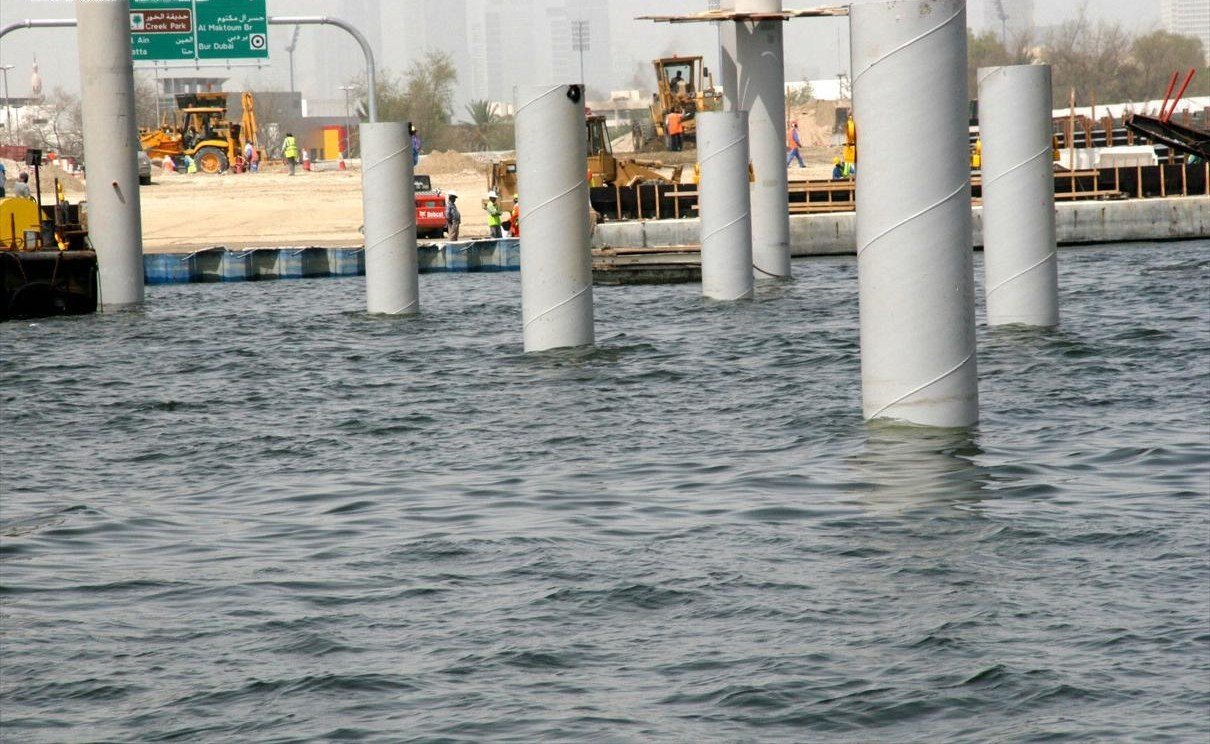

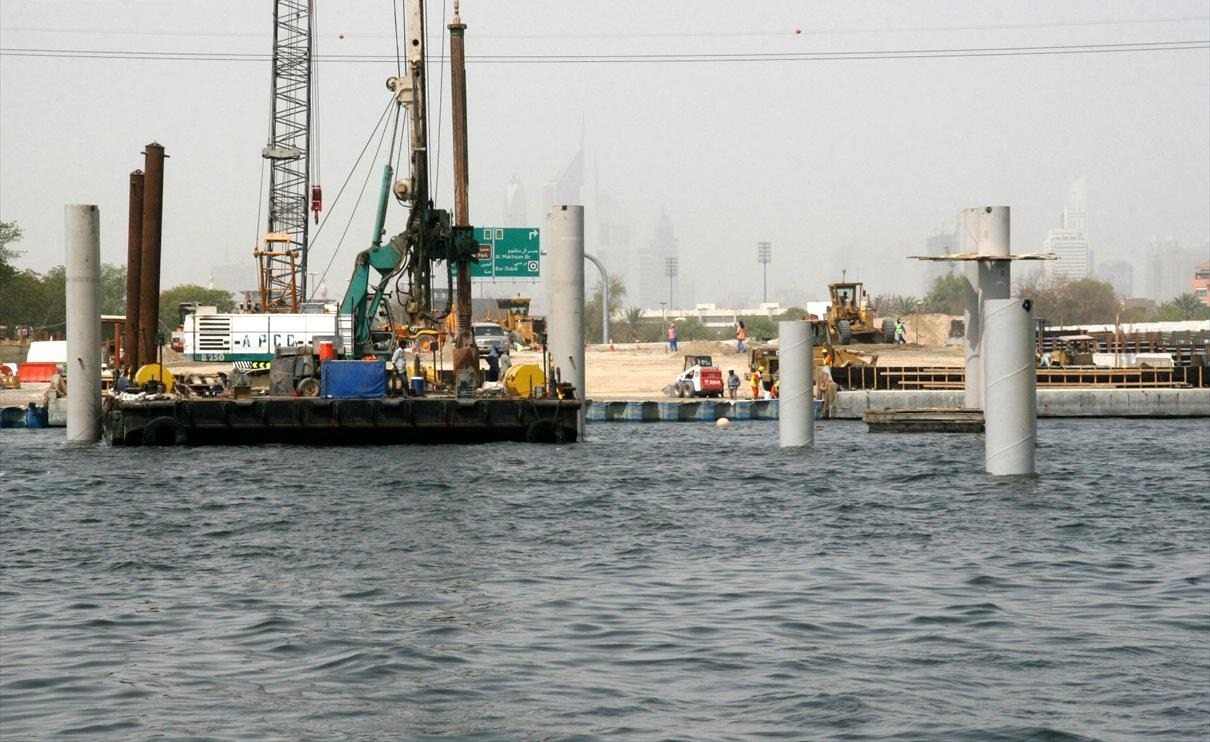
