= Dubai Fencing Club =

UAE fencing club

This is the logo of the Dubai Fencing Club logo, which integrates the flag of the United Arab Emirates. The club's motto is, "Passion for the sport of fencing."

Dubai Fencing Club was founded in 2002 by Bulgarian former modern pentathlete Mihail Gueorguiev Kouzev. It is located in Dubai in the United Arab Emirates.

As of 2006, the club met in the Quay Health Club in the Mina Al Salaam Hotel. Mihail Kouzev is still the club's head coach.
