= 1971 in the United Arab Emirates =

- Decades: 1970s; 1980s; 1990s
- See also: Other events of 1971; Timeline of Emirati history

Events from the year 1971 in the United Arab Emirates.

== Incumbents ==
- President: Zayed bin Sultan Al Nahyan (starting 2 December)
- Prime Minister: Maktoum bin Rashid Al Maktoum (starting 9 December)

== Events ==
=== December ===
- December 2 - Six of the emirates of the Trucial States form the United Arab Emirates.
