= 2000 in the United Arab Emirates =

- Decades: 1980s; 1990s; 2000s; 2010s; 2020s
- See also: Other events of 2000; Timeline of Emirati history

The following lists events that happened during 2000 in the United Arab Emirates.

== Incumbents ==
- President: Zayed bin Sultan Al Nahyan
- Prime Minister: Maktoum bin Rashid Al Maktoum

== Events ==
- 2000 ACC Trophy.
