= 1975 in the United Arab Emirates =

- Decades: 1970s; 1980s; 1990s
- See also: Other events of 1975; Timeline of Emirati history

The following lists events that happened during 1975 in the United Arab Emirates.

== Incumbents ==
- President: Zayed bin Sultan Al Nahyan
- Prime Minister: Maktoum bin Rashid Al Maktoum

== Events ==
=== March ===
- March 12 - The Dubai Islamic Bank was established in the United Arab Emirates, becoming the first private institution to operate under the principles of Islamic banking. With the charging of interest on a loan prohibited by Islamic law, the banks instead make an investment in the item upon which the loan is planned, without a fixed interest rate. Similar Islamic banks were established in 1977 in Kuwait, Egypt and the Sudan.
