= 1974 in the United Arab Emirates =

- Decades: 1970s; 1980s; 1990s
- See also: Other events of 1974; Timeline of Emirati history

Events from the year 1974 in the United Arab Emirates.

== Incumbents ==
- President: Zayed bin Sultan Al Nahyan
- Prime Minister: Maktoum bin Rashid Al Maktoum

== Establishments ==
- Al Jazira Club
- Sharjah English School
