= Salik (road toll) =

Electronic Toll system in Dubai, UAE

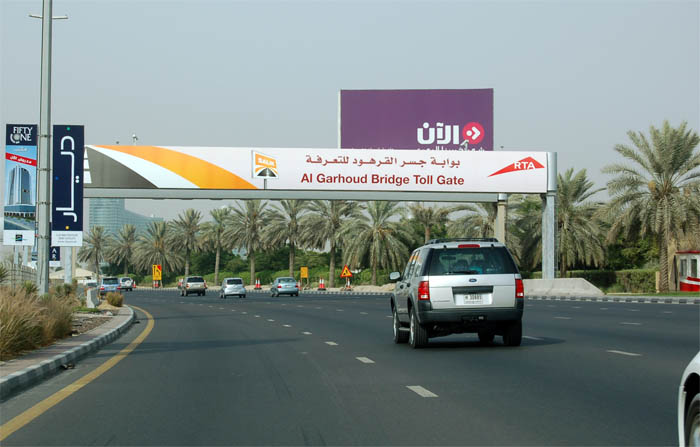
Al Garhoud Bridge Toll Gate

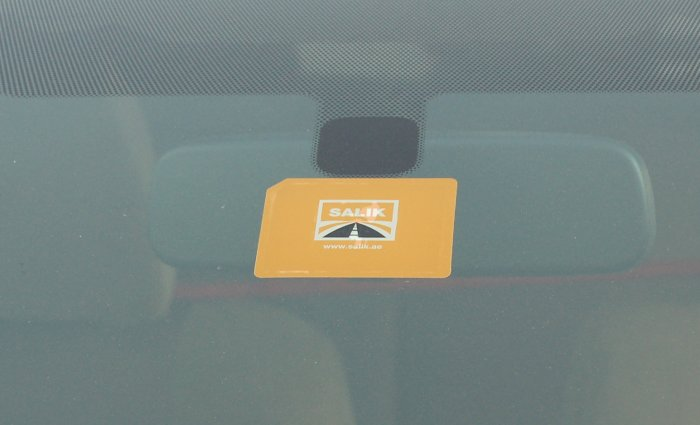
Salik Tag on windshield

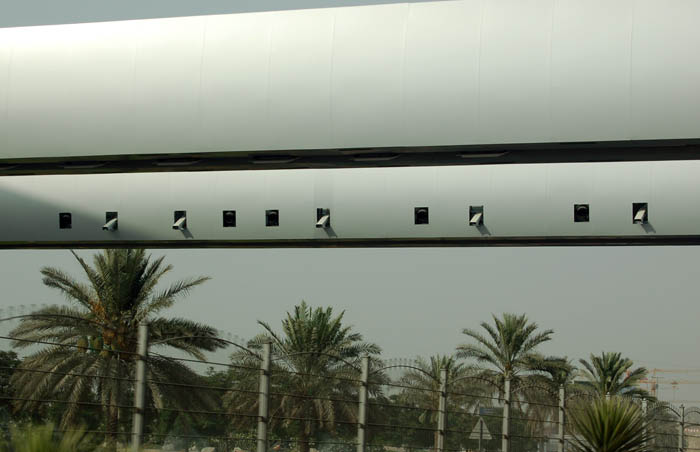
Salik Toll Gate near Al Garhoud Bridge

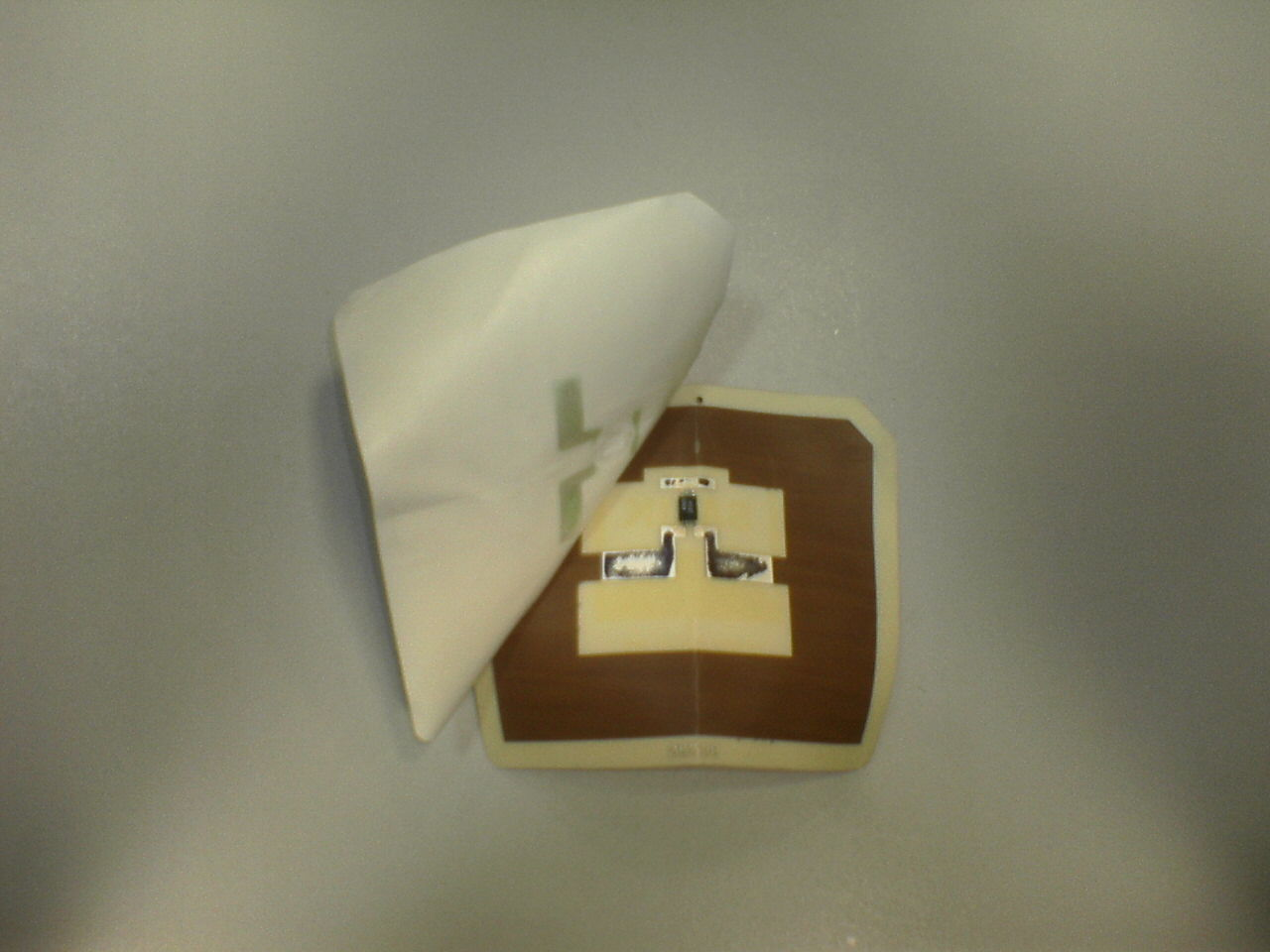
Inside Salik Tag - RFID Antenna around and Chip on center

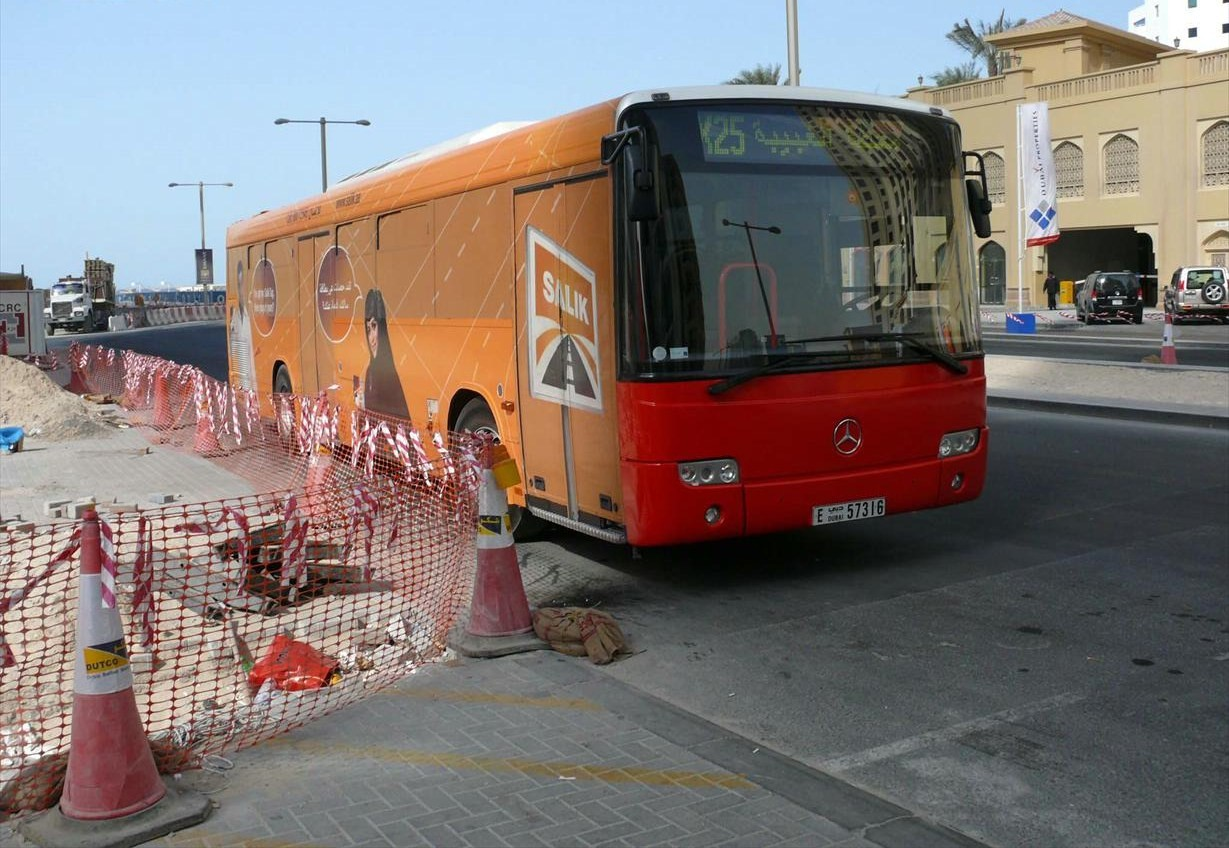
A Salik advertisement on a Dubai RTA bus

Salik (In Arabic: سالك meaning "clear and moving") is the name given to the electronic toll road system in Dubai, United Arab Emirates, which is based on RFID and ANPR technology, automatically deducting a fee when a vehicle passes under a toll gate. The Salik toll was launched by Dubai's Roads and Transport Authority (RTA) on 1 July 2007.

On the 5th of July 2022, Salik was established as a public joint stock company as Salik Company PJSC.

Motorists are required to buy a pre-paid tag for 100 AED (which includes 50 AED in toll balance) that is affixed to their windscreens. Initially, the system charged a flat rate of 4 AED per crossing. However, starting 31 January 2025, Salik introduced variable dynamic pricing based on the time of day, with charges ranging from being completely free during the night to 6 AED during peak traffic hours. Currently, Salik operates ten toll gates in Dubai.

== History ==
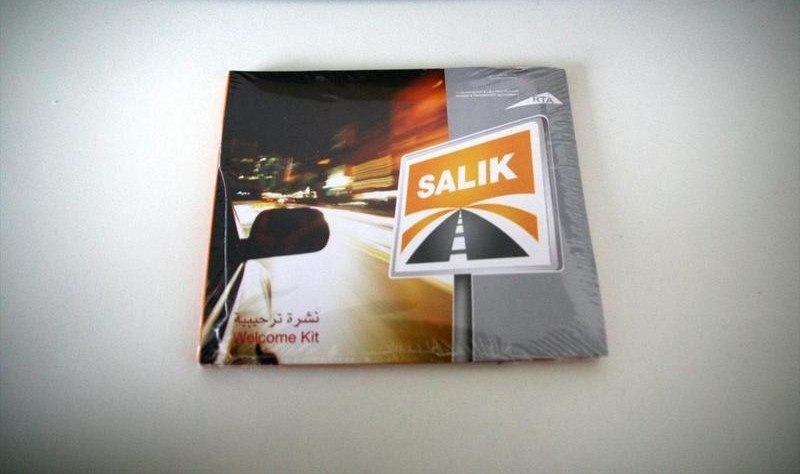
Salik Welcome Kit

The system initially launched on 1 July 2007 with two toll gates, one near Al Garhoud Bridge, and one near Mall of the Emirates on Sheikh Zayed Road (Al Barsha gate).

On 9 September 2008, two more SALIK gates were installed at Safa Park and Al Maktoum Bridge.

SALIK gates were subsequently installed at two additional locations, two at both sides of the Al Mamzar Bridge on Al Ittihad Road and one at the Dubai Airport Tunnel. These were activated on 15 April 2013.

Another SALIK gate was added on Sheikh Zayed Road, near Energy Metro Station close to Ibn Battuta Mall (Jebel Ali gate), becoming operational on 24 October 2018.

In November 2024, two new Salik gates were installed, one at the Business Bay Crossing on Al Khail Road and another at Al Safa South on Sheikh Zayed Road. This brought the total number of SALIK toll gates in Dubai to ten.

== List of toll gates ==
Currently, Salik operates ten toll gates across Dubai:

- Al Barsha
- Al Garhoud Bridge
- Business Bay Crossing
- Al Maktoum Bridge
- Al Mamzar South
- Al Mamzar North
- Al Safa South
- Al Safa North
- Airport Tunnel
- Jebel Ali

Motorists passing through both Al Mamzar North and South gates within one hour in the same direction are only charged once. The same rule applies to the Al Safa North and South gates.

== Technology ==
SALIK utilizes both 'passive' RFID tags and ANPR technology. The passive RFID tags are powered by the transceiver in the toll gate to automatically identify the vehicle using radio waves.

In conjunction with RFID, Salik uses ANPR cameras to capture and read vehicle license plates. This approach ensures accurate toll collection acting as a backup if an RFID tag is missing or unreadable.

== Expansion into parking systems ==
In a strategic expansion beyond road tolls, Salik brought its technology to parking systems across Dubai.

On 1 July 2024, in partnership with Emaar Malls, Salik launched its first automated parking payment system at Dubai Mall, covering the Fashion, Grand and Cinema parking zones. As a vehicle enters and exits the parking facility, ANPR cameras capture the license plate, calculate the parking duration and automatically deduct the applicable parking fees from the motorist's linked Salik account.

Following the success at Dubai Mall, Salik announced a major expansion of its parking ecosystem in August 2025. Partnering with Parkonic (a private smart parking operator) and Dubai Holding, Salik integrated its payment infrastructure into the region's first fully AI-powered autonomous parking solution. This expansion brought the ticketless Salik payment system to numerous on-street and off-street parking spaces across major Dubai communities and tourist destinations, including The Beach JBR, Global Village, and Palm West Beach.

== Advantages and impact ==
Salik has been highly effective in managing traffic distribution across Dubai's major corridors. According to SALIK, travel on Salik-tolled roads saves commuters an average of 44% in journey time compared to toll-free routes. The introduction of the dynamic pricing model in January 2025 successfully shifted commuter behavior, resulting in a 9% reduction in traffic volume on the heavily congested Sheikh Zayed Road during peak hours. Similarly, the activation of the Business Bay Crossing gate in late 2024 redirected traffic and reduced congestion on Al Khail Road and Al Rabat Street by 15% and 16%, respectively.

Unlike traditional toll booths that require motorists to slow down, stop and manually pay with cash or card, Salik utilizes a completely barrier-free system. As a result, vehicles can pass beneath the gates at normal highway speeds without interruption.

== Early Criticism of Salik ==
Upon its initial launch on 1 July 2007, the Salik system faced significant criticism from commuters regarding the timing of its implementation. Because several alternative routes and major public transport projects (like the Dubai Metro) were not yet completed, motorists diverting to avoid the toll gates caused heavy congestion in previously traffic-free residential communities like The Springs, The Greens and Al Barsha. For example, the Floating Bridge, which was heavily advertised as an alternative route to the tolled Al Garhoud Bridge, did not open to the public until 16 July 2007, two weeks after the Salik gates became active.

== Dubai taxis ==
Since February 2013, all Dubai taxis automatically add the Salik toll fees to the passenger's final taxi fare.
