= 1979 in the United Arab Emirates =

- Decades: 1970s; 1980s; 1990s
- See also: Other events of 1979; Timeline of Emirati history

Events from the year 1979 in the United Arab Emirates.

== Incumbents ==
- President: Zayed bin Sultan Al Nahyan
- Prime Minister: Maktoum bin Rashid Al Maktoum (until 25 April), Rashid bin Saeed Al Maktoum (starting 25 April)

== Establishments ==
- Sharjah Indian School.
