= 1997 in the United Arab Emirates =

- Decades: 1970s; 1980s; 1990s; 2000s; 2010s
- See also: Other events of 1997; Timeline of Emirati history

Events from the year 1997 in the United Arab Emirates.

== Events ==
=== December ===
15 December
On 15 December, Tajikistan Airlines Flight 3183, a Tupolev Tu-154B-1, crashed on approach to Sharjah Airport killing all but one of the 86 occupants on board.

== Incumbents ==
- President: Zayed bin Sultan Al Nahyan
- Prime Minister: Maktoum bin Rashid Al Maktoum
