= Iraq–United Arab Emirates relations =

- Iraq: United Arab Emirates

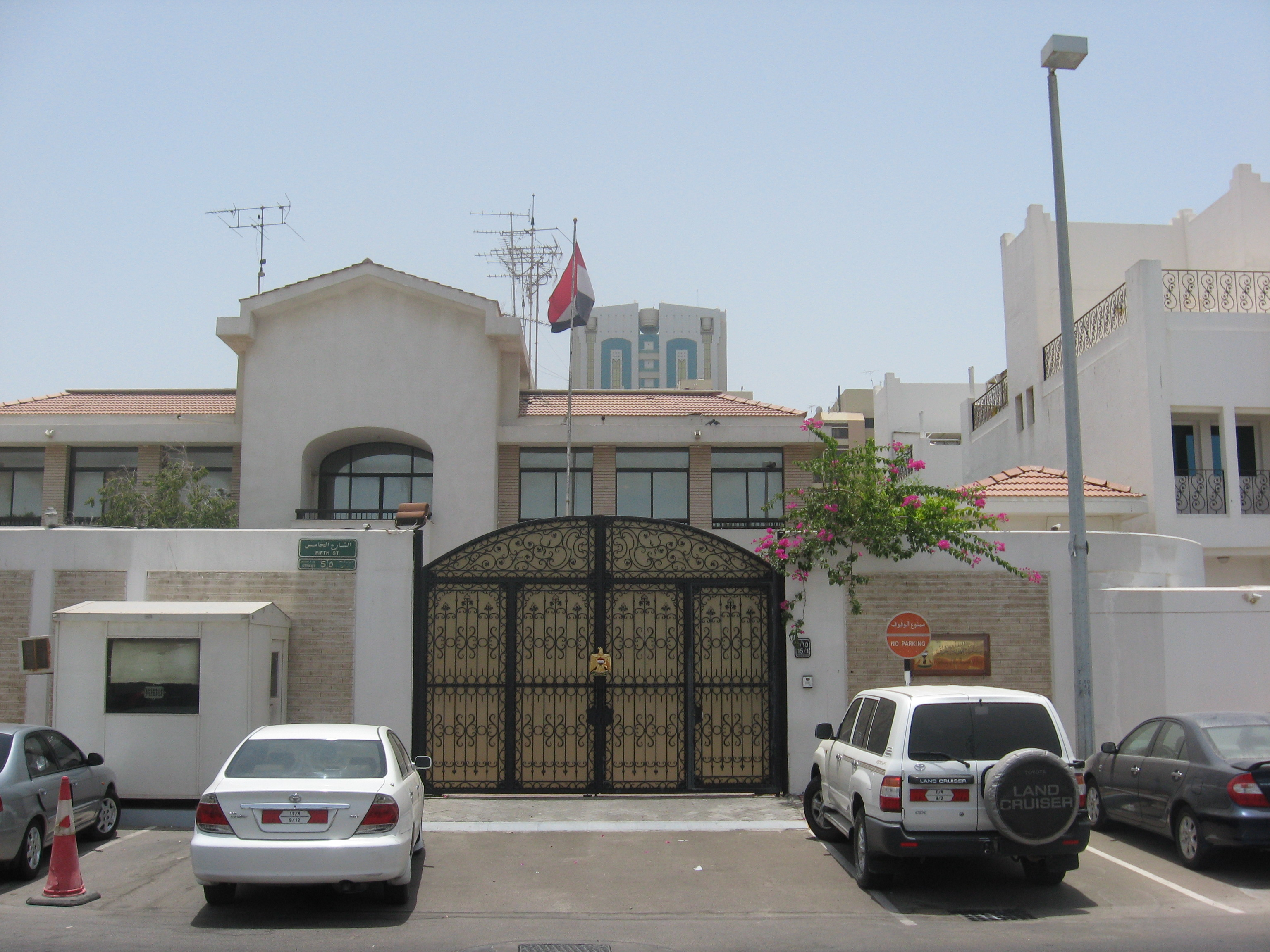
Iraqi embassy in Abu Dhabi, UAE.

Iraq–United Arab Emirates relations (Arabic: العلاقات العراقية الإماراتية) are foreign relations between the Republic of Iraq and the United Arab Emirates. Iraq has an embassy in Abu Dhabi and a consulates general in Dubai, while the United Arab Emirates has an embassy in Baghdad.

== Collaborations ==
In 1991, the UAE joined the Arab states that opposed the Iraqi invasion of Kuwait and supported the use of force to compel Iraq's withdrawal of troops.

In June 2008, the Iraqi government announced that the United Arab Emirates would send an ambassador to Baghdad within a few days. This would become the first Arab ambassador in Iraq since the kidnapping and murder of Ihab el-Sherif in July 2005. This announcement was made during a surprise visit by the United Arab Emirates' Foreign Minister Abdullah bin Zayed Al Nahyan to Baghdad on 5 June 2008. This marked the first time a high-ranking official from the Gulf Cooperation Council visited Iraq since March 2003.

On 31 July 2007 following Iraq's victory of the Asian Cup, Sheikh Mohammed bin Rashid Al Maktoum, vice-president and prime minister of the UAE awarded the Iraq National football team 20 million Dhs, ($5.2 million) for capturing the Asian Cup for the first time in the country's history.

== Resident diplomatic missions ==
- Iraq has an embassy in Abu Dhabi and a consulate-general in Dubai.
- the United Arab Emirates has an embassy in Baghdad and a consulate-general in Erbil.

== See also ==
- Foreign relations of Iraq
- Foreign relations of the United Arab Emirates
- Iraqis in the United Arab Emirates
