= 1994 in the United Arab Emirates =

- Decades: 1970s; 1980s; 1990s; 2000s; 2010s
- See also: Other events of 1994; Timeline of Emirati history

Events from the year 1994 in the United Arab Emirates.

== Incumbents ==
- President: Zayed bin Sultan Al Nahyan
- Prime Minister: Maktoum bin Rashid Al Maktoum

== Incidents ==
- Sarah Balabagan arrested
