= 1978 in the United Arab Emirates =

- Decades: 1970s; 1980s; 1990s
- See also: Other events of 1978; Timeline of Emirati history

Events from the year 1978 in the United Arab Emirates.

== Incumbents ==
- President: Zayed bin Sultan Al Nahyan
- Prime Minister: Maktoum bin Rashid Al Maktoum

== Establishments ==
- Khaleej Times.
- Dubai College.
