= Rosil Al Azawi =

Iraqi presenter

- Born: January 11, 1987 (age 39); Sharjah, United Arab Emirates
- Website: www.rosil.tv

Rosil Al Azawi (Arabic: رسل العزاوي) (born January 11, 1987, in Sharjah, UAE) is an Iraqi television presenter, former model and film producer based in the United Arab Emirates.

== Career ==
Rosil first appeared on screen at the age of 13, on a show called Salam wa kalam on Channel 4, which proved to be successful throughout the Arab world. She has been in more than 67 successful television programs and is known for her spontaneity and free spirit on television.

Before ending her career in television, Rosil produced and presented the award-winning program Free for eight seasons on Al Sharqiya. The program aimed to bring peace to Iraq and bring all Iraqis together as one.

She also worked as production manager on an animated feature Bilal (2015 film).
