= Sheikh Rashid bin Saeed Crossing =

- Coordinates: 25°12′40.88″N 55°20′42.38″E
- Carries: Vehicles and Dubai Metro's Green Line
- Crosses: Dubai Creek
- Locale: Dubai, United Arab Emirates
- Maintained by: Roads and Transport Authority

Characteristics
- Design: Arch
- Total length: 1,600 metres (5,200 ft)
- Width: 64 metres (210 ft)
- Height: 190 metres (620 ft)
- Longest span: 667 metres (2,188 ft)
- Clearance below: 15 metres (49 ft)

History
- Designer: FXFOWLE Architects
- Construction cost: US$817 million

Location
- Interactive map of Sheikh Rashid bin Saeed Crossing

Sheikh Rashid bin Saeed Crossing, also known as Sixth Crossing, was reported in 2008 as a future bridge in Dubai, United Arab Emirates. If completed, it will become the world's longest arch bridge, with a main span 667 metres (2,188 ft) long. The bridge's overall length will be 1.6 kilometres (0.99 mi). The bridge will be 64 metres (210 ft) wide and will rise 15 metres (49 ft) above the water. The bridge, designed by FXFOWLE Architects, with lighting by AWA Lighting Designers, will cost AED 2.5 billion. It will be a part of a AED 3 billion roads project near The Lagoons. The bridge is 75% complete as of August 2022.

The bridge will link the localities of Al Jaddaf and Bur Dubai. It will have six lanes of traffic in each direction and will be able to carry 20,000 vehicles per hour. In the center will be a track for Dubai Metro's Green Line. In December 2022, RTA has opened Phase I of the Sheikh Rashid bin Saeed Improvement Corridor Project in Dubai.

Since December 2022, progress has been steadily made on the transport infrastructure surrounding the proposed Sheikh Rashid bin Saeed Crossing. In July 2023, the RTA completed the second and final phase of the Sheikh Rashid bin Saeed Corridor Improvement Project, covering 8 km of Ras Al Khor Road and adding approximately 2 km of bridges, with the improvements reducing the expected journey time along the corridor from 20 minutes to around seven minutes. Further improvements have strengthened connections on the Bur Dubai side, including the completion of the Al Shindagha Corridor works in 2025, providing continuous traffic flow from Al Garhoud Bridge through Sheikh Rashid Road and Infinity Bridge towards Port Rashid.

In March 2026, additional bridges opened as part of the wider Sheikh Rashid Corridor development, which was reported to be 72% complete at the time. The Sheikh Rashid bin Saeed Crossing itself remains the planned Creek connection between Al Jaddaf in Bur Dubai and the road between Dubai Creek Harbour and Dubai Festival City, forming a major future link between the two sides of Dubai Creek.

== See also ==
- List of bridges and tunnels in Dubai
- List of longest arch bridge spans
