= Infinity Bridge (Dubai) =

Coordinates: 25.2750°N 55.2944°E

The Infinity Bridge is a road and pedestrian crossing of Dubai creek in Dubai, United Arab Emirates, from Al Shindagha on the Bur Dubai side to Al Ras on the Deira side.

It formed part of the Al Shindagha Corridor Improvement project, aiming to replace the Al Shindagha Tunnel, originally opened in 1975, as the main crossing at the mouth of Dubai creek between Bur Dubai and Deira. The 300 metre long and 55m-wide bridge connects a 12 lane, 13km expressway and is shaped in the symbol for infinity. The structure was proposed and defined by consultants Parsons.

Opened in January 2022, the bridge connects the areas of Al Hudaiba, Al Raffa, Al Jafiliya, Al Mankhool, Al Kifaf, and Al Karama. The 13km expressway, opened in March 2025, forms a corridor connecting millions of residents and major developments, including Dubai Islands, Dubai Waterfront, and Port Rashid.

The bridge rises 15.5 metres above the Dubai Creek. With six lanes of traffic in each direction and pedestrian crossings, it is crowned by a 42-metre high steel arch representing the mathematical symbol of infinity. Constructed by Belgian contractor Besix, the bridge project cost $102,000,000.

== Structure ==
The two steel arches of the bridge are diagonally positioned over the bridge deck with a span of some 135 metres between its piers, creating an 'infinity' shape. The arches were prefabricated and then assembled on site. It effectively replaced the Shindagha tunnel as the main route for traffic between the Bur Dubai and Deira sides of the Dubai creek.

The bridge also includes a 3-metre-wide cycling track and a 75-meter-wide marine navigation passage.
