= Outline of Dubai =

City in the United Arab Emirates

Flag of Dubai

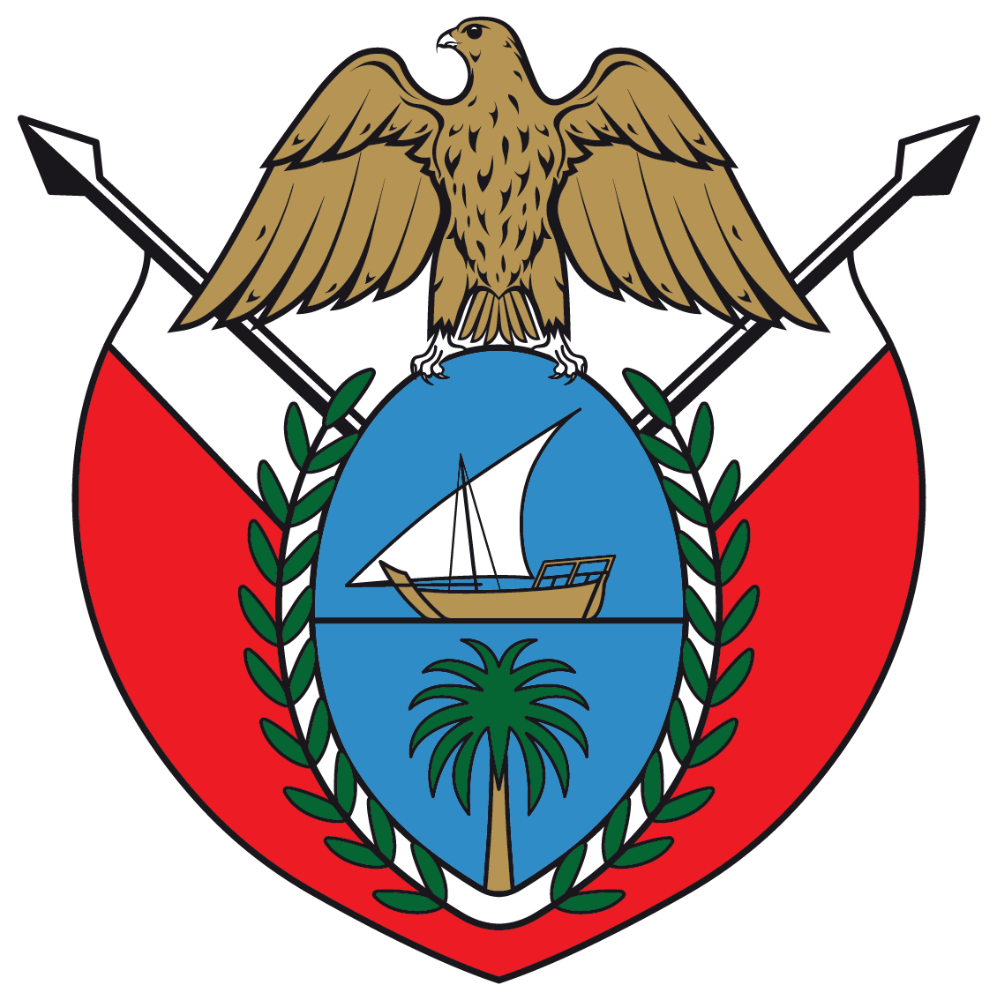
Coat of arms of Dubai

The following outline is provided as an overview of and topical guide to Dubai.

== General reference ==
- Pronunciation: (/duːˈbaɪ/ doo-BY; Arabic: دبي Dubay, Gulf Arabic: [dʊˈbɑj])
- Common English name(s): Dubai
- Official English name(s): Dubai
- Adjectival(s): Dubaite
- Demonym(s): Dubaite

== Geography of Dubai ==
Geography of Dubai

- Dubai is:
  - a city
- Population of Dubai: 3,010,261
- Area of Dubai: 4,114 km^{2} (1,588 sq mi)

Dubai دبي
- Location within United Arab Emirates
- Coordinates: 25°15′47″N 55°17′50″E

=== Location of Dubai ===
- Dubai is situated within the following regions:
  - Northern Hemisphere and Eastern Hemisphere
    - Asia (outline)
      - Western Asia
        - Arabian Peninsula
          - United Arab Emirates
            - Emirate of Dubai
              - Dubai-Sharjah-Ajman metropolitan area
- Time zone(s):
  - UAE Standard Time (UTC+4)

=== Environment of Dubai ===
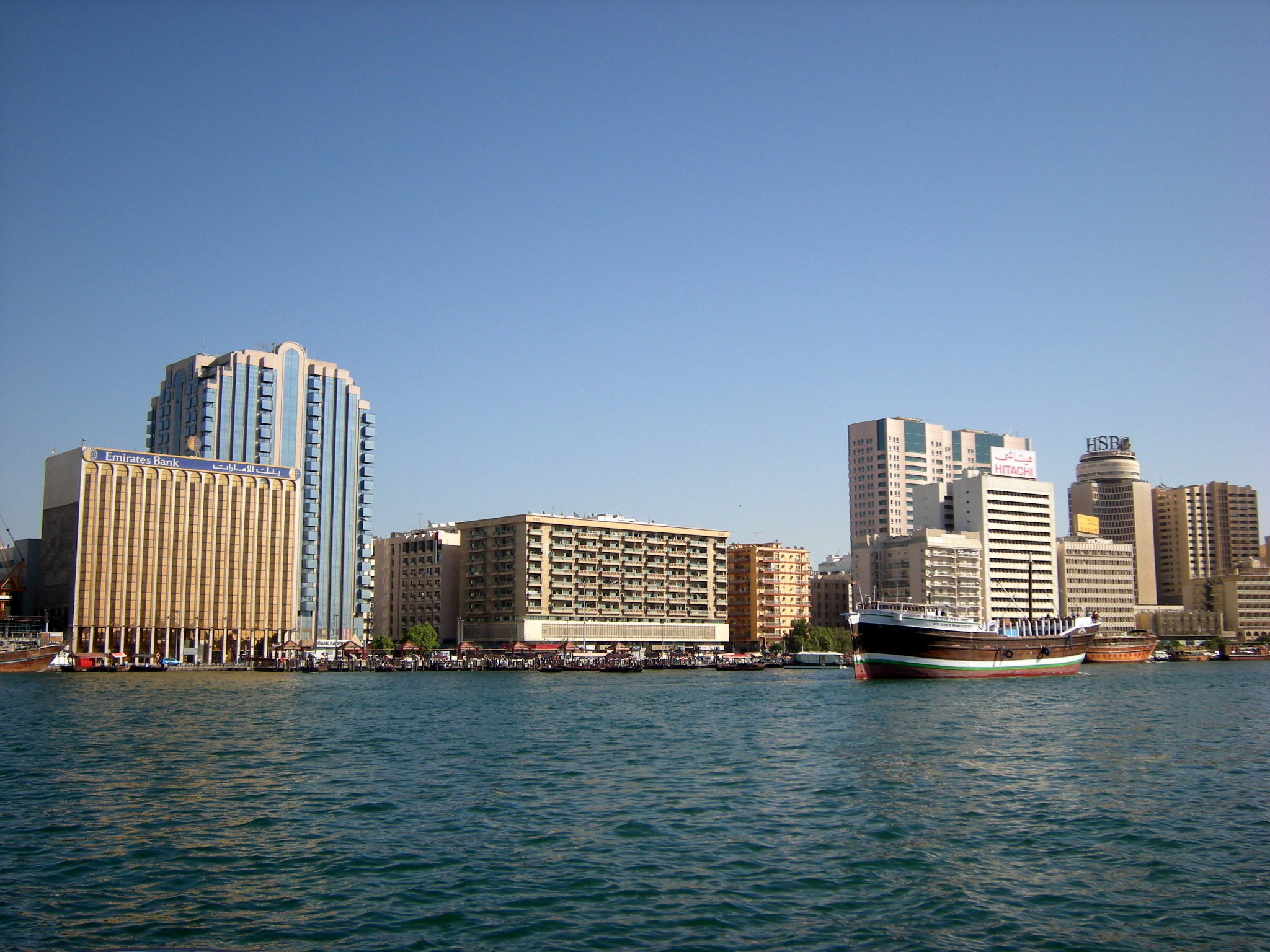
Dubai Creek

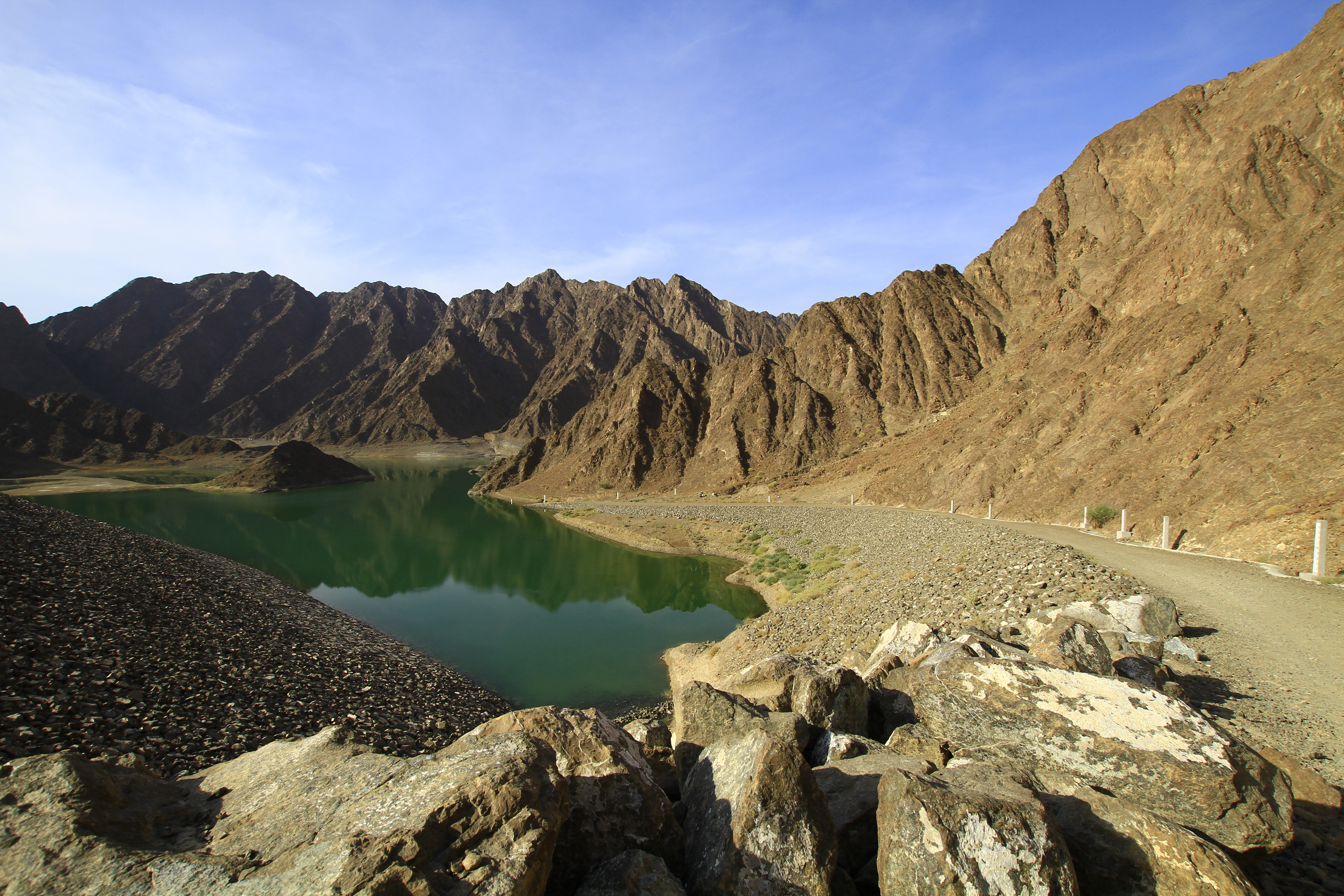
Hatta Reservoir

- Climate of Dubai
- Sustainability in Dubai

==== Natural geographic features of Dubai ====
- Beaches in Dubai
  - Jumeirah Beach
- Canals in Dubai
  - Dubai Water Canal
- Creeks in Dubai
  - Dubai Creek
- Desert in Dubai
  - The Empty Quarter
- Lakes in Dubai
  - Al Qudra Lake
- Mountains in Dubai
  - Al Hajar Mountains

=== Areas of Dubai ===
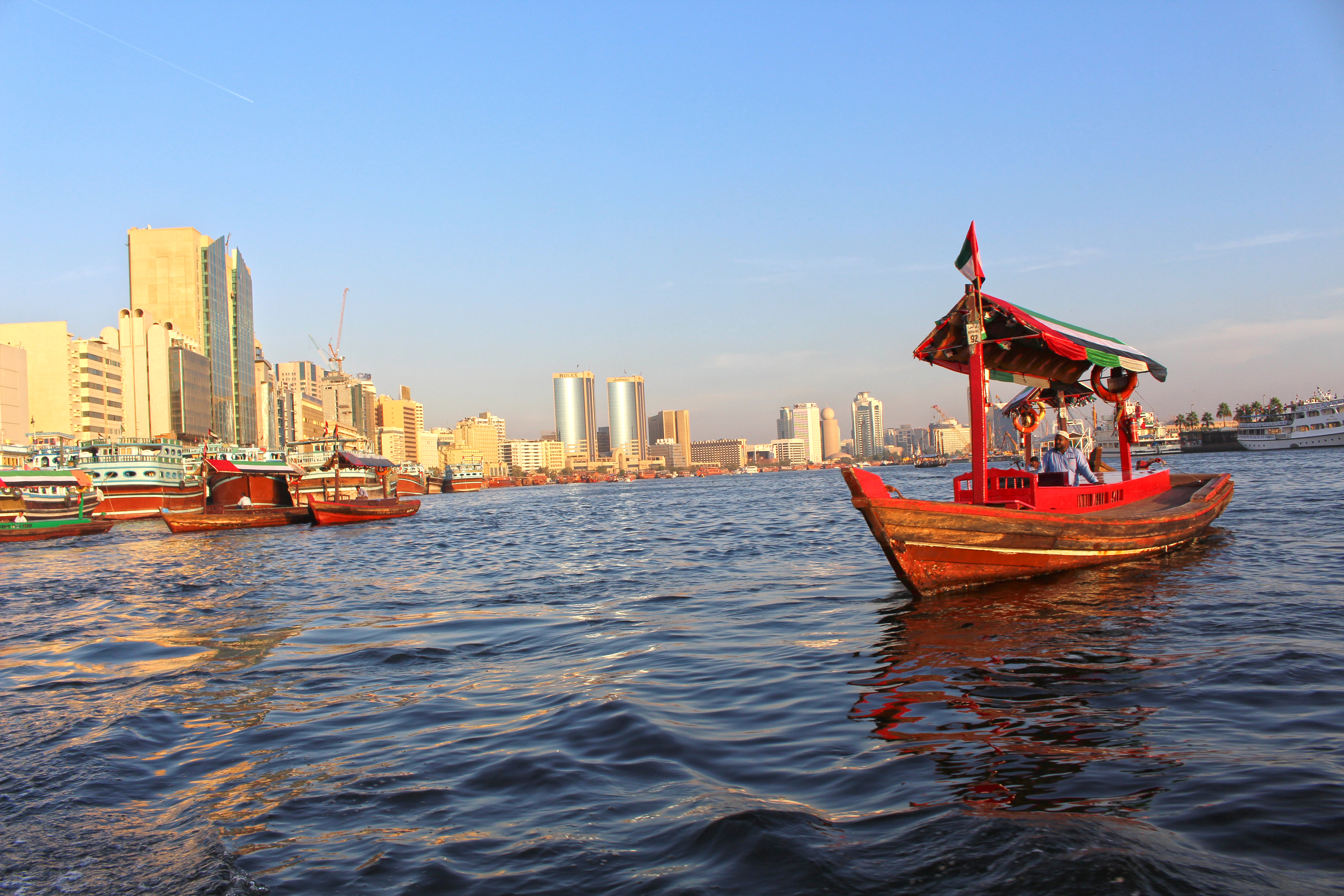
Deira

Al Bastakiya

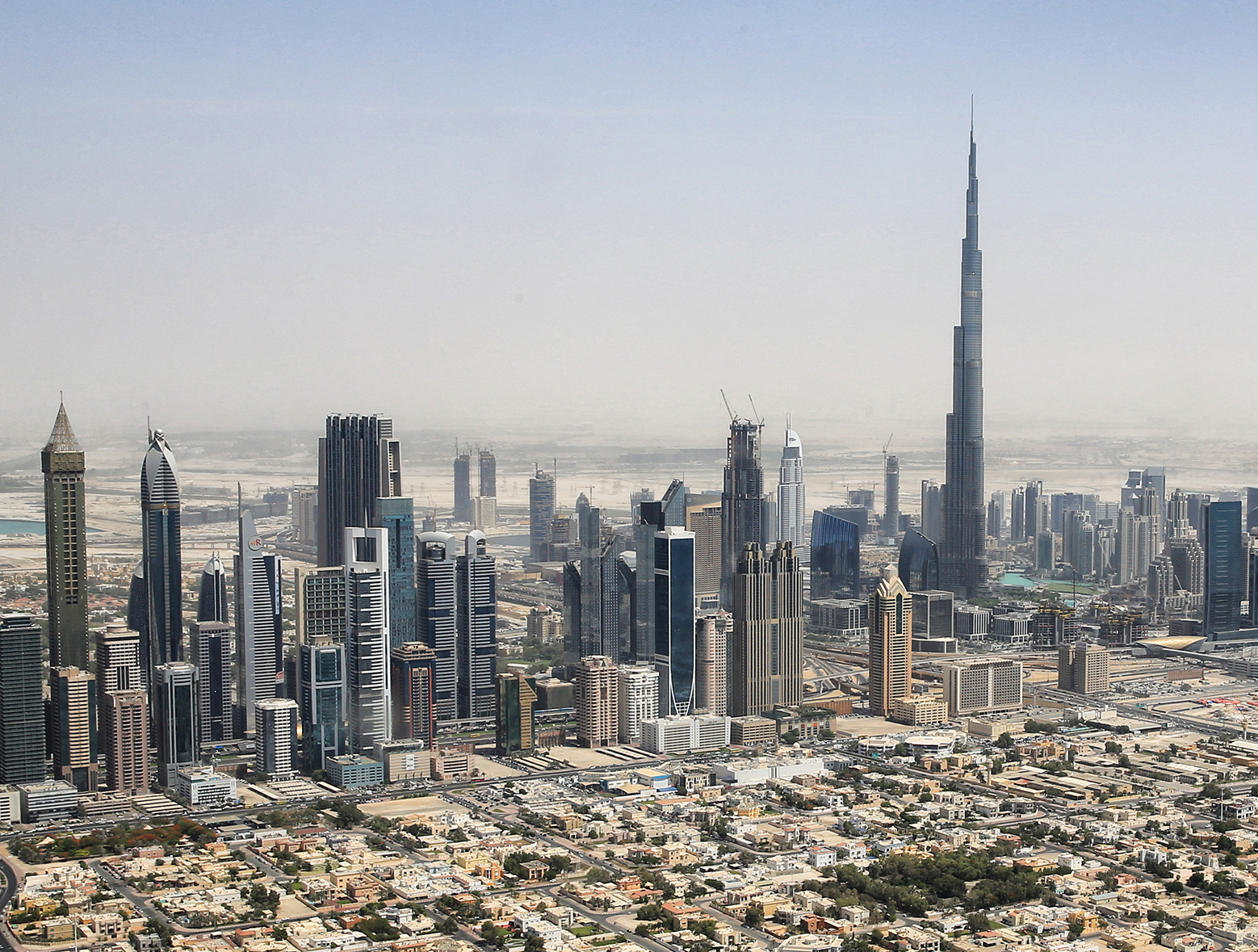
Downtown Dubai

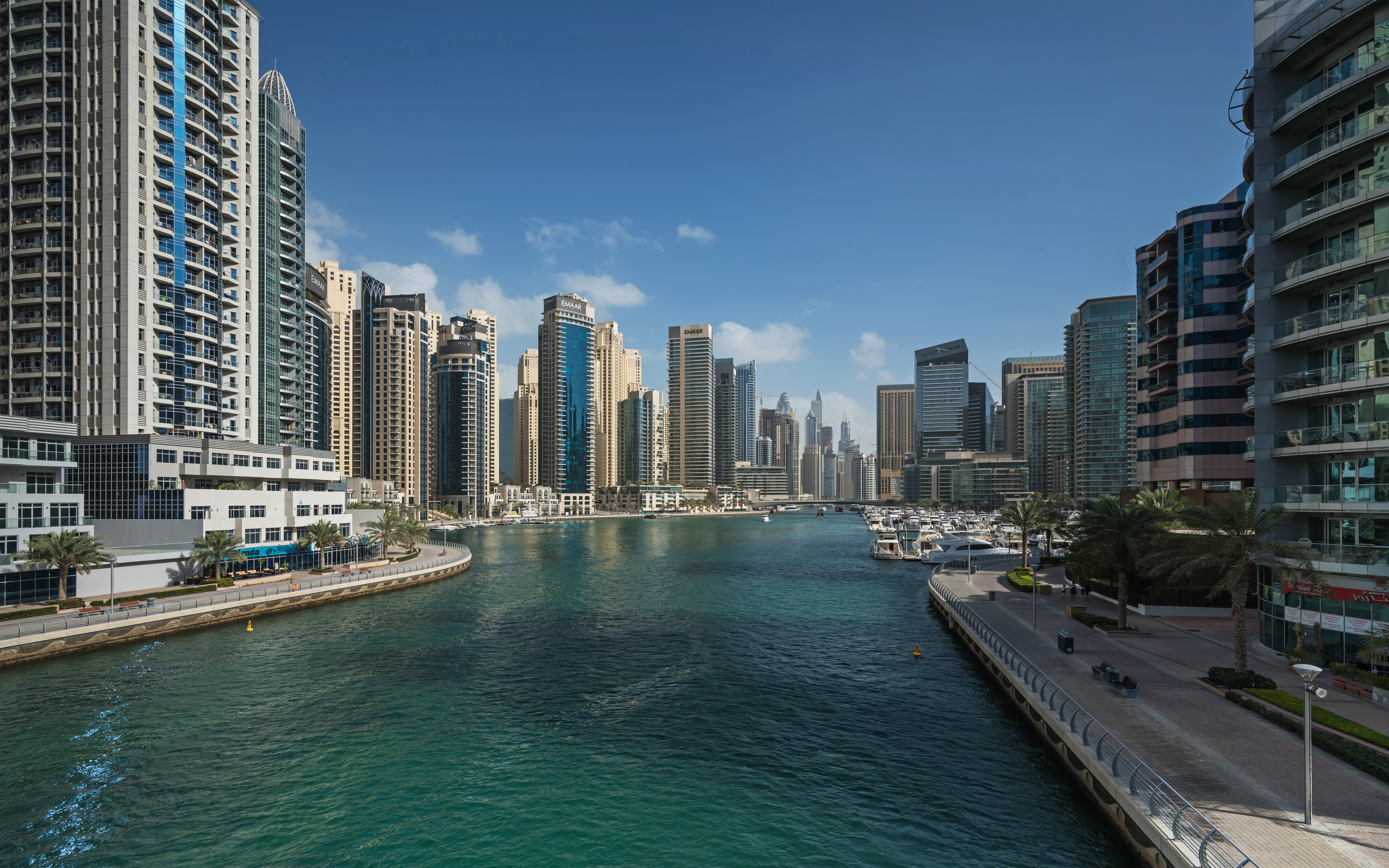
Dubai Marina

- Deira
- Hatta
- Jumeirah

==== Districts of Dubai ====
- Al Bastakiya
- Al Karama
- Bur Dubai
- Business Bay
- Downtown Dubai
- Dubai Marina

==== Communities in Dubai ====
Communities in Dubai

=== Locations in Dubai ===
- Tourist attractions in Dubai
  - Museums in Dubai
  - Shopping areas and markets

==== Bridges in Dubai ====
Bridges in Dubai

- Al Garhoud Bridge
- Al Ittihad Bridge
- Al Maktoum Bridge
- Business Bay Crossing
- Floating Bridge
- Sheikh Rashid bin Saeed Crossing

==== Cultural and exhibition centres in Dubai ====
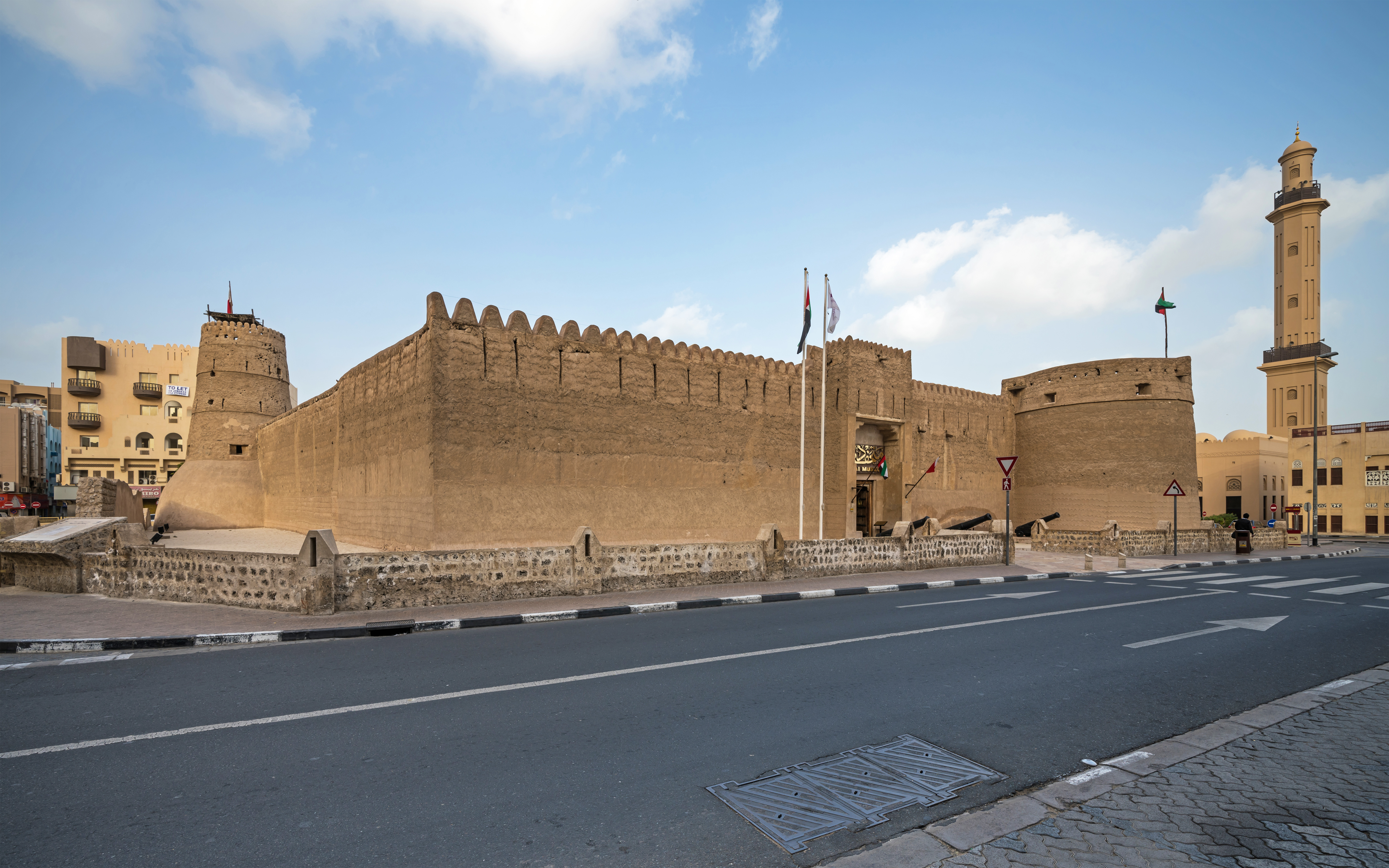
Al Fahidi Fort

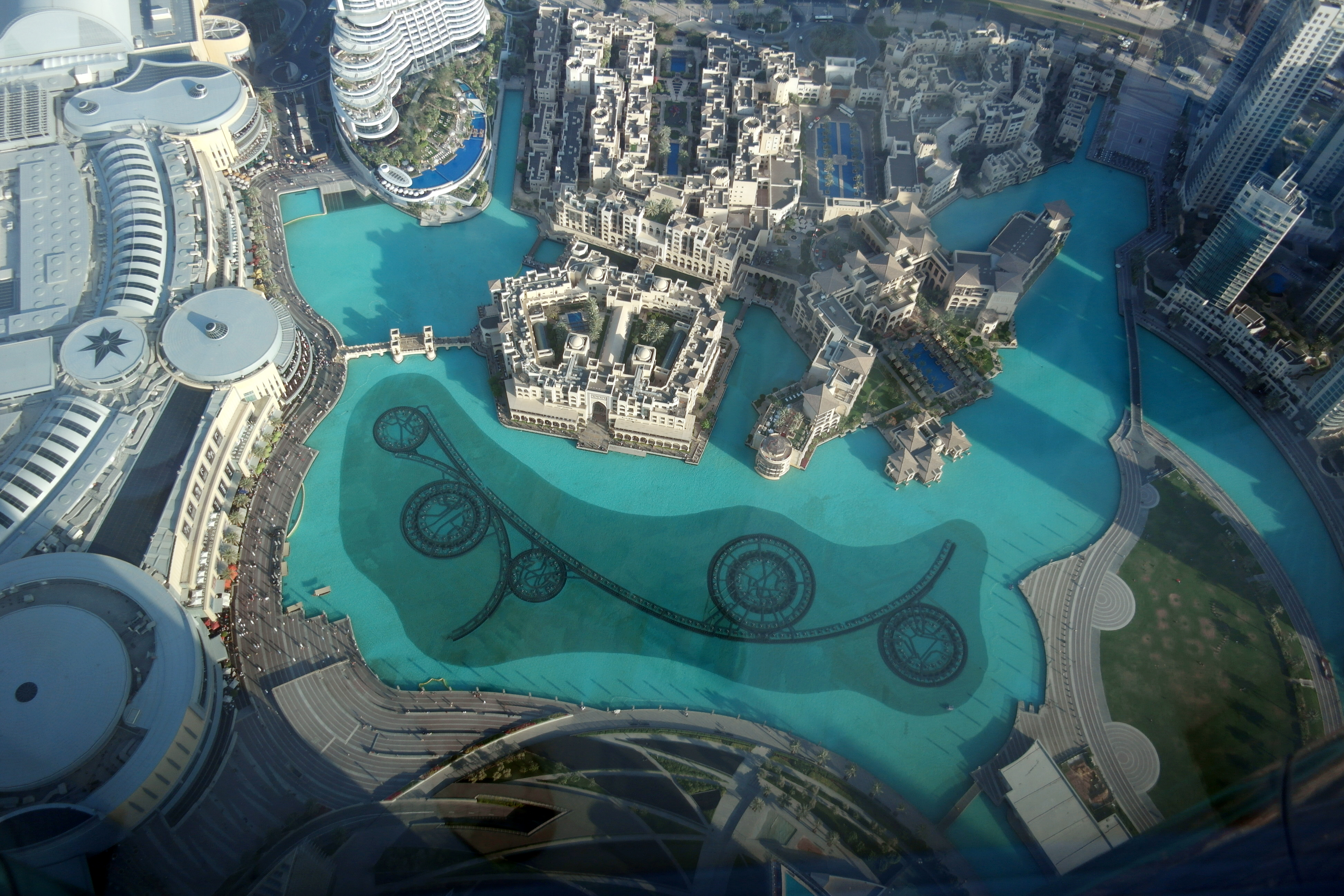
The Dubai Fountain

- Dubai International Convention Centre
- Markaz

==== Forts of Dubai ====
- Al Fahidi Fort

==== Fountains in Dubai ====
- The Dubai Fountain

==== Monuments and memorials in Dubai ====
- Deira Clocktower

==== Museums and art galleries in Dubai ====
Museums in Dubai

- Dubai Moving Image Museum
- Dubai Museum
- Etihad Museum
- Museum of the Future
- Alserkal Avenue
- Saeed Al Maktoum House
- Salsali Private Museum
- Sheikh Obaid bin Thani House
- The Mine

==== Parks and gardens in Dubai ====
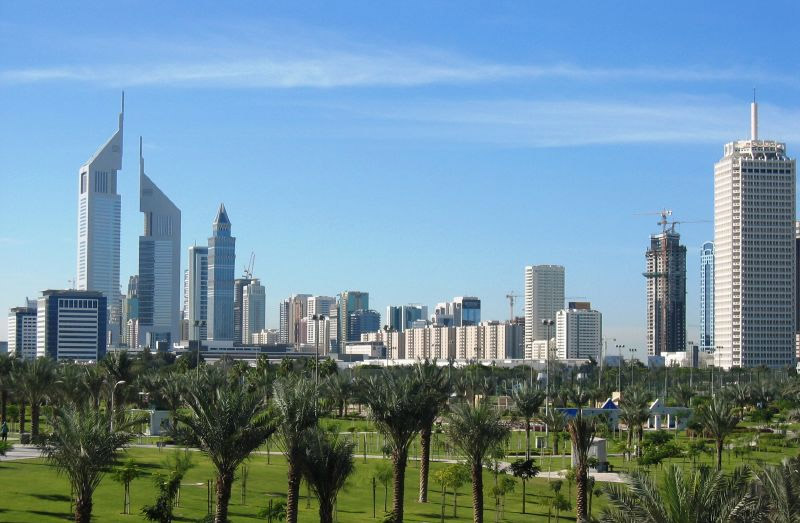
The Zabeel Park

Parks in Dubai

- Dubai Miracle Garden
- Dubai Safari Park
- Mushrif Park
- Safa Park
- Wild Wadi Water Park
- Zabeel Park
  - Dubai Frame

==== Religious buildings in Dubai ====
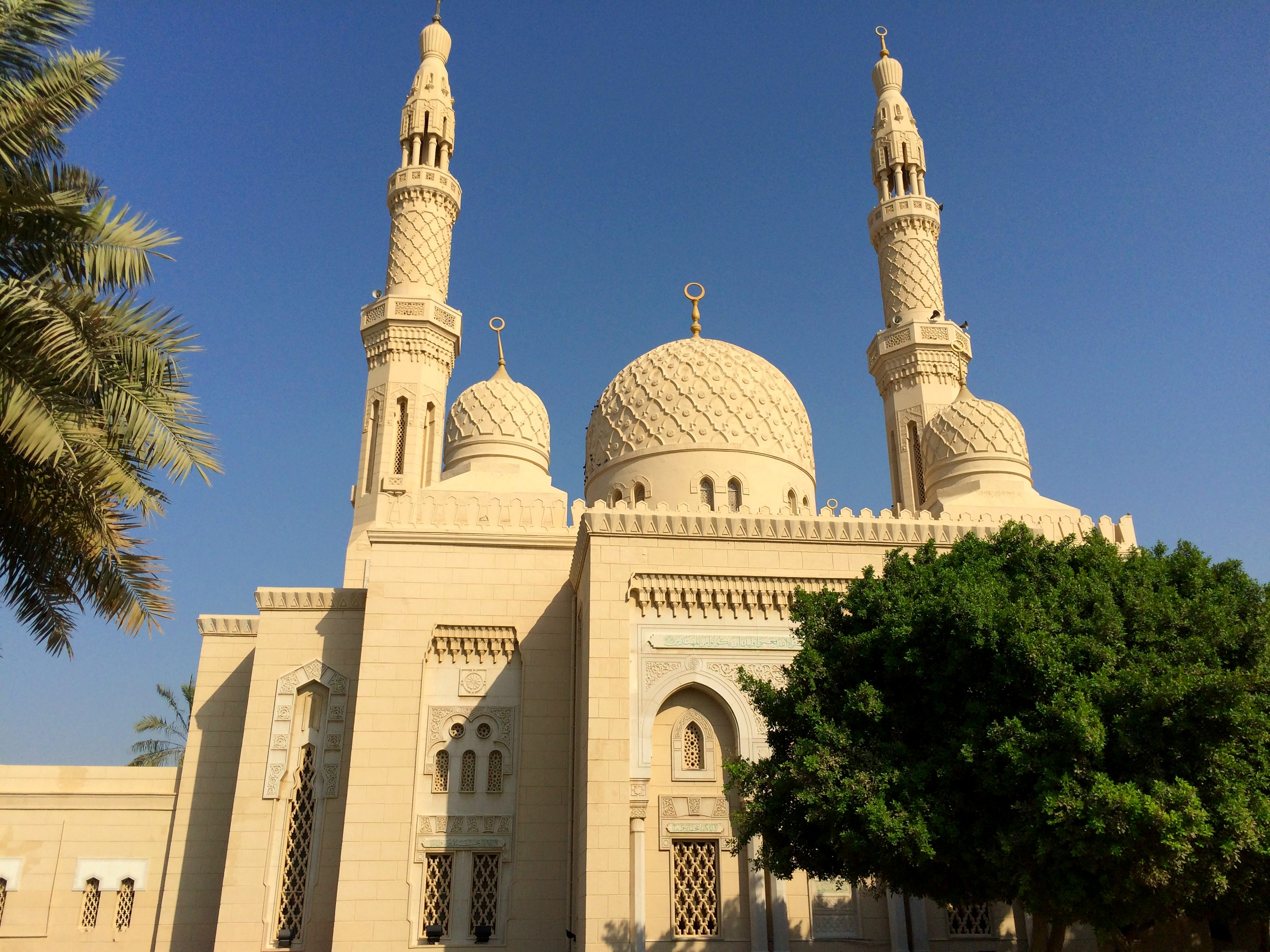
The Jumeirah Mosque

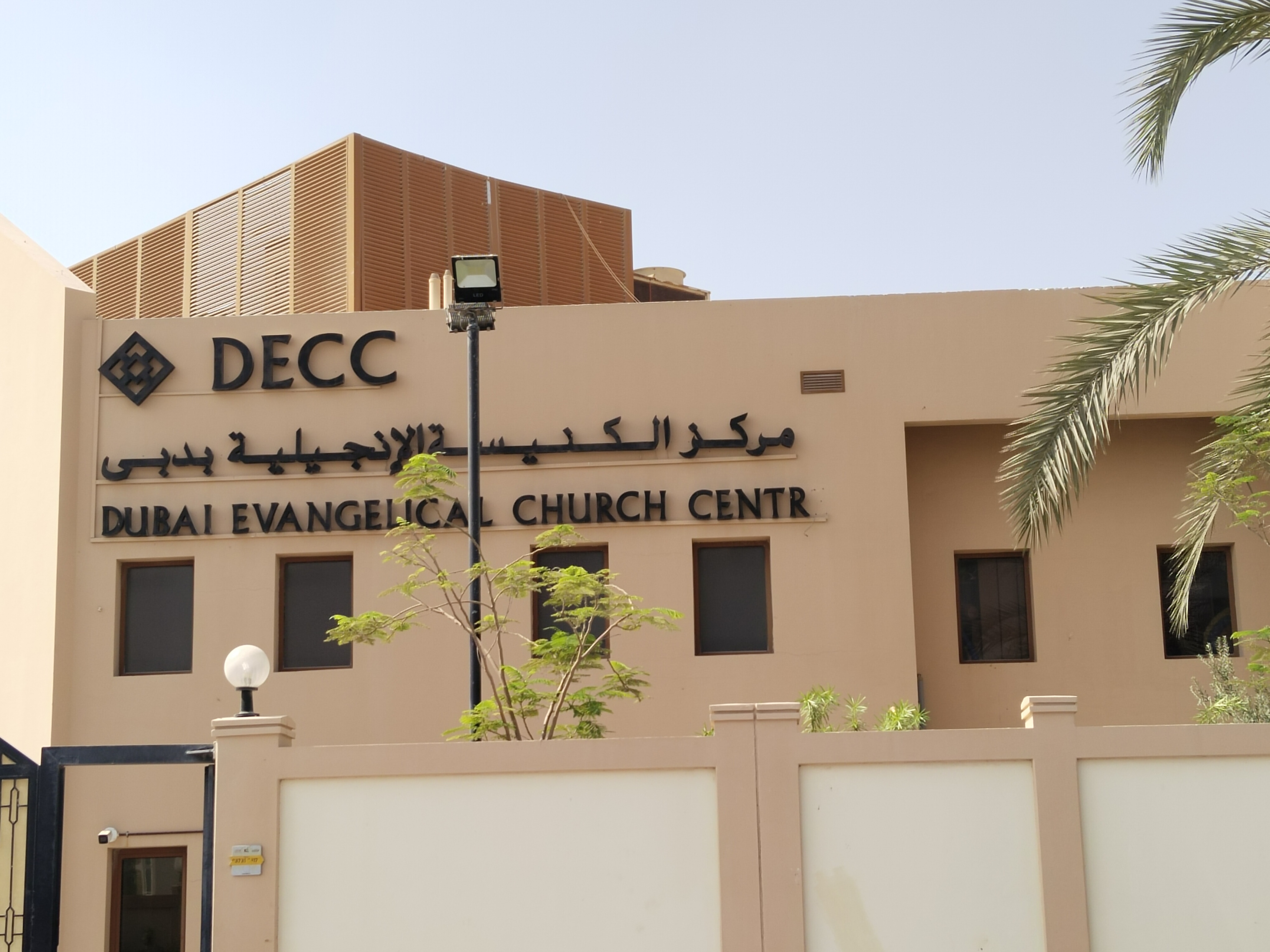
The United Christian Church of Dubai

- Al Farooq Omar Bin Al Khattab Mosque
- Dubai City Church
- Grand Mosque
- Hindu Temple
- Iranian Mosque, Bur Dubai
- Jumeirah Mosque
- St. Francis of Assisi Catholic Church

==== Secular buildings in Dubai ====
Burj Al Arab

Burj Khalifa, the world's tallest building

- 23 Marina
- Address Downtown
- Almas Tower
- Burj Al Alam
- Burj Al Arab
- Burj Khalifa
- Cayan Tower
- DAMAC Residenze
- Dubai Pearl
- Dubai World Trade Centre
- Elite Towers
- Emirates Towers
- Gevora Hotel
- HHHR Tower
- Jumeirah Emirates Towers Hotel
- Ocean Heights
- Pentominium
- Rose Rayhaan by Rotana
- The Index
- The Wave Tower

==== Streets in Dubai ====
- Deira Corniche

==== Towers in Dubai ====
- Dubai Creek Tower

=== Demographics of Dubai ===
Demographics of Dubai

== Government and politics of Dubai ==
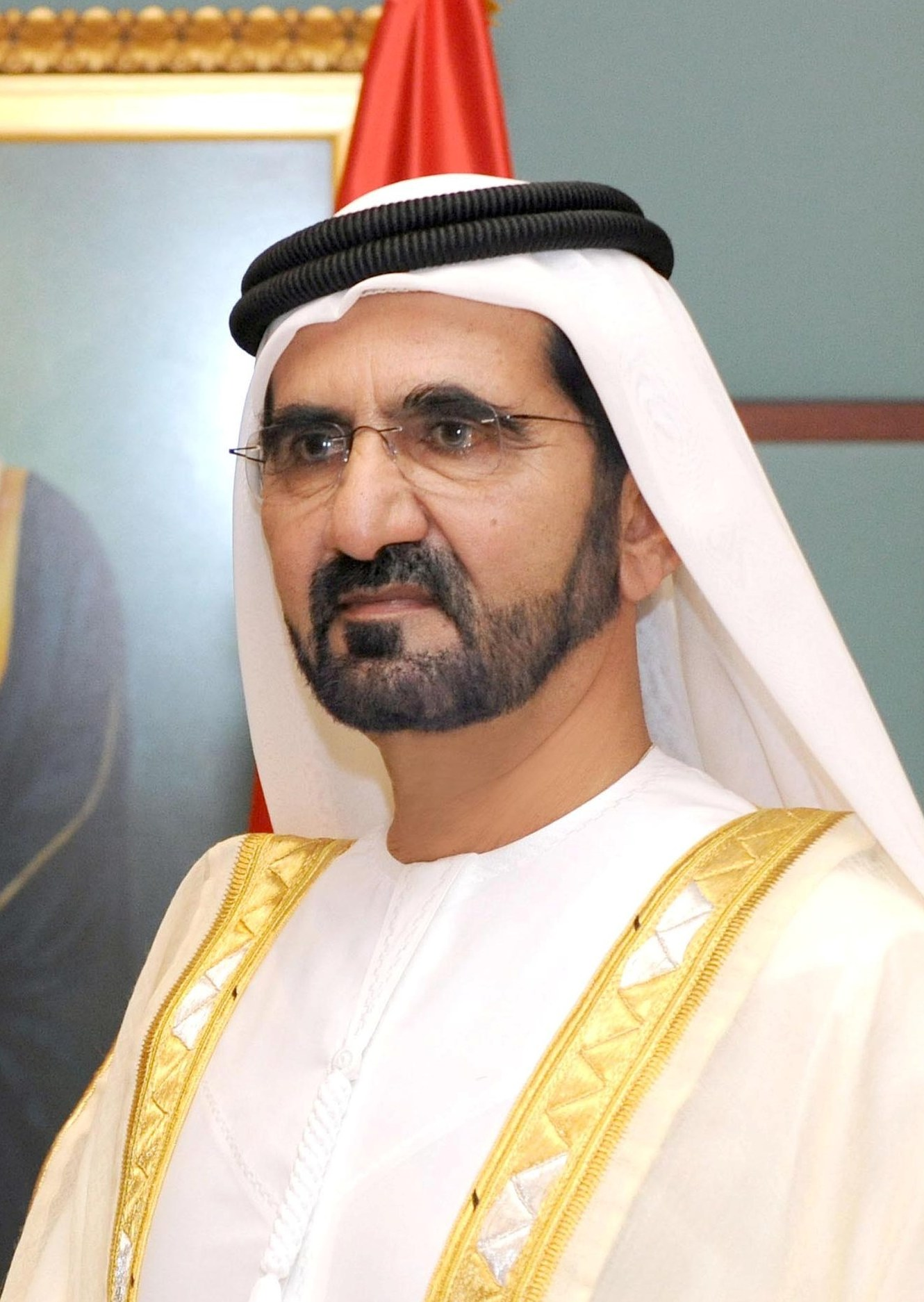
Mohammed bin Rashid Al Maktoum, Ruler of Dubai

Government of Dubai

- Dubai Municipality
- International relations of Dubai
  - Twin towns and sister cities of Dubai

=== Law and order in Dubai ===
- Human rights in Dubai
  - Human rights in Dubai
    - Religious freedom
- Law enforcement in Dubai
  - Dubai Police Force
  - Sharia laws

== History of Dubai ==
History of Dubai

=== History of Dubai, by period or event ===
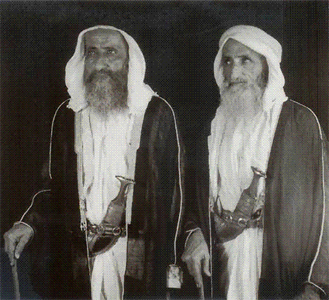
Sheikh Juma Al Maktoum (left) and Sheikh Saeed bin Maktoum Al Maktoum (right) of the Maktoum family

Timeline of Dubai

- Early history
- Dubai during the 18th century
- Dubai during the 19th century
  - Dubai becomes a British Protectorate (1892)
- Dubai during the 20th century
  - Dubai joins six other emirates in establishing the United Arab Emirates (1971)
  - Dubai, in conjunction with the other emirates, introduces the UAE dirham, the uniform currency of the UAE (1973)
- Dubai in the new millennium

=== History of Dubai, by subject ===
==== Archaeological sites in Dubai ====
- Al Sufouh Archaeological Site
- Jumeirah Archaeological Site
- Saruq Al Hadid Archaeological Site

== Culture of Dubai ==
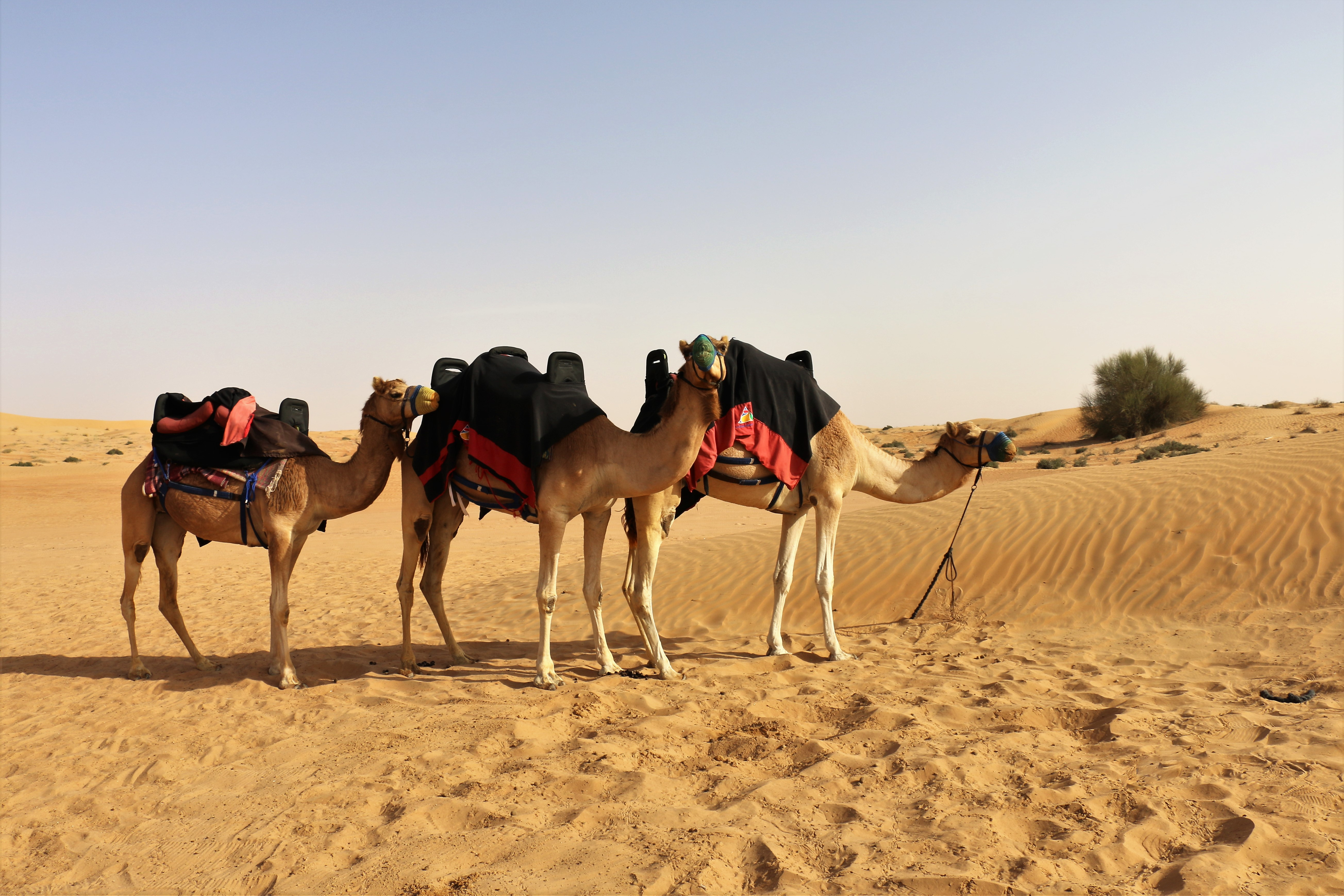
Camel Riding in Dubai

Culture of Dubai

- Dubai Culture

=== Arts in Dubai ===
==== Architecture of Dubai ====
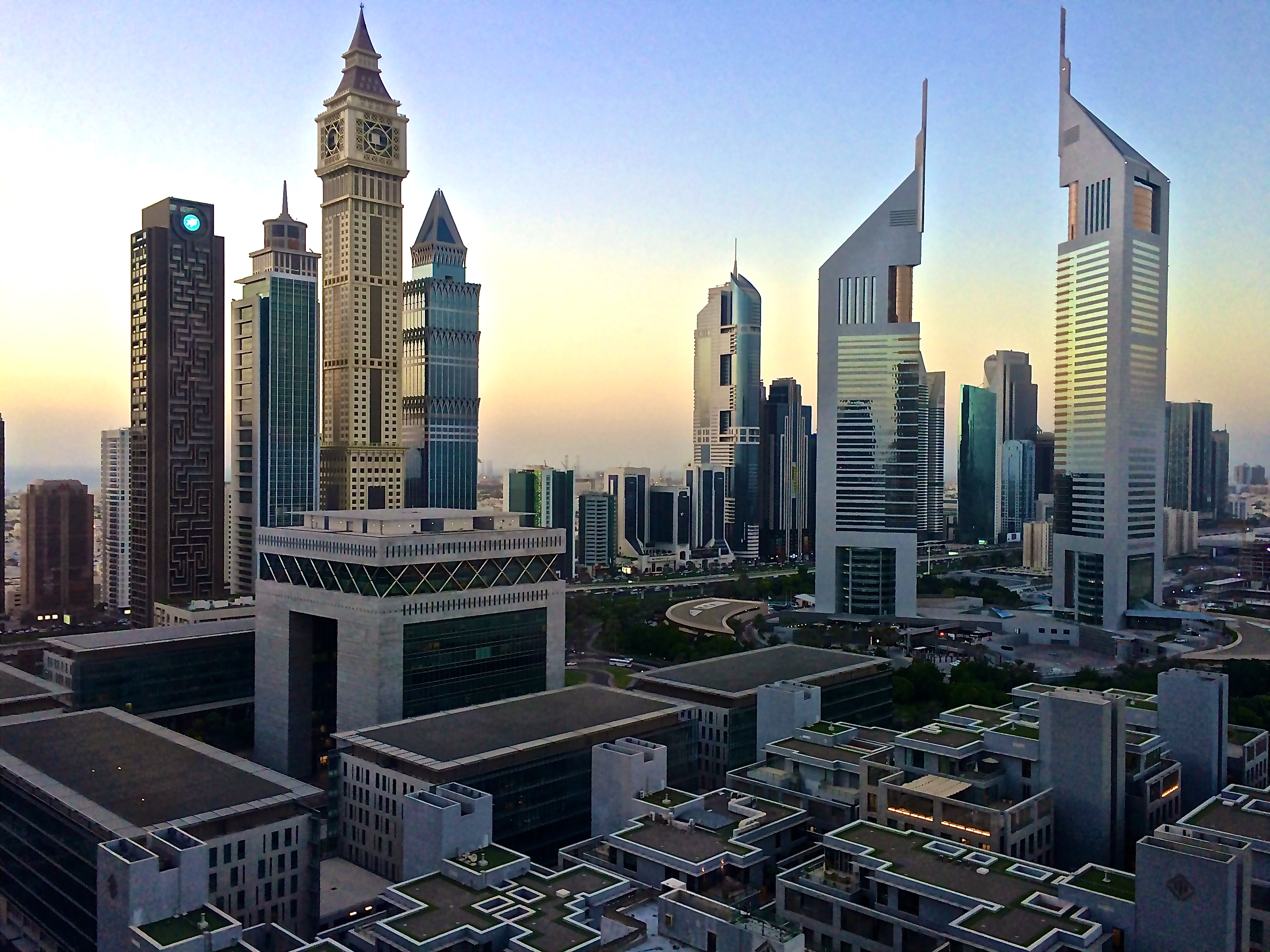
The Emirates Towers (the tallest two buildings on the right)

Atlantis The Palm, a modern interpretation of Islamic architecture

Architecture of Dubai

- Buildings in Dubai
  - Tallest buildings in Dubai
  - Tallest residential buildings in Dubai
- Developments in Dubai
  - Bluewaters Island
  - Downtown Dubai
  - Dubailand
  - Dubai Waterfront
  - Jumeirah Islands
  - Palm Islands
    - Deira Island
    - Palm Jebel Ali
    - Palm Jumeirah
  - The World
    - Developments of The World archipelago

==== Cinema of Dubai ====
- Dubai International Film Festival

==== Literature of Dubai ====
- Dubai International Writers' Centre
  - Emirates Airline Festival of Literature

==== Music of Dubai ====
Music of Dubai

- Music festivals and competitions in Dubai
  - Dubai International Jazz Festival
- Music venues in Dubai
  - Dubai Opera
- Musical ensembles in Dubai
  - UAE Philharmonic Orchestra

==== Visual arts of Dubai ====
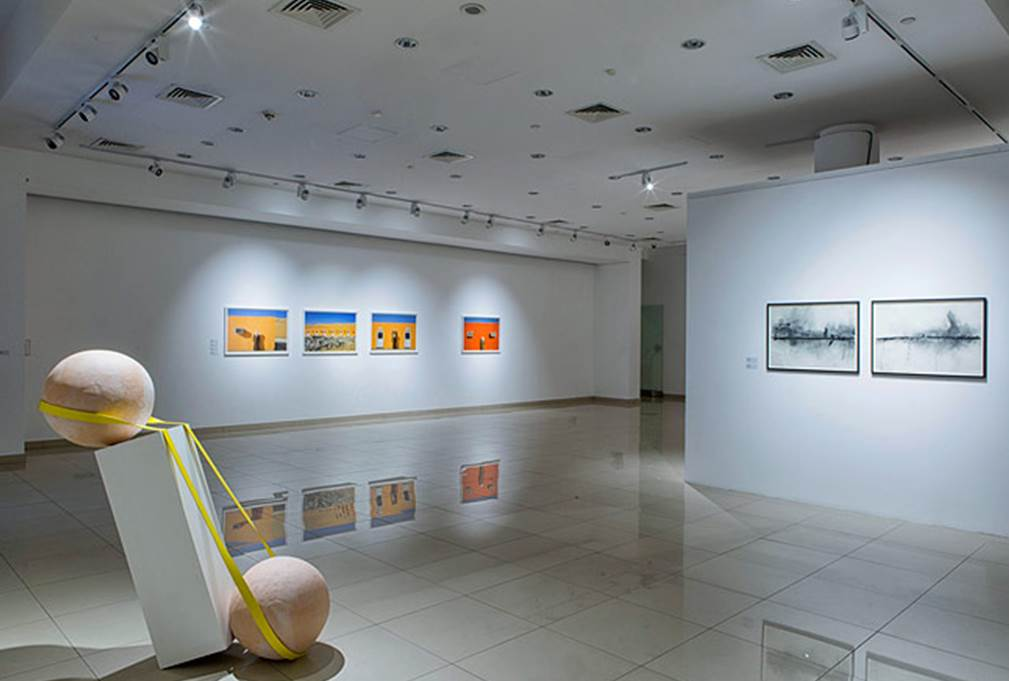
Exhibition at the Dubai Community Theatre & Arts Centre (DUCTAC)

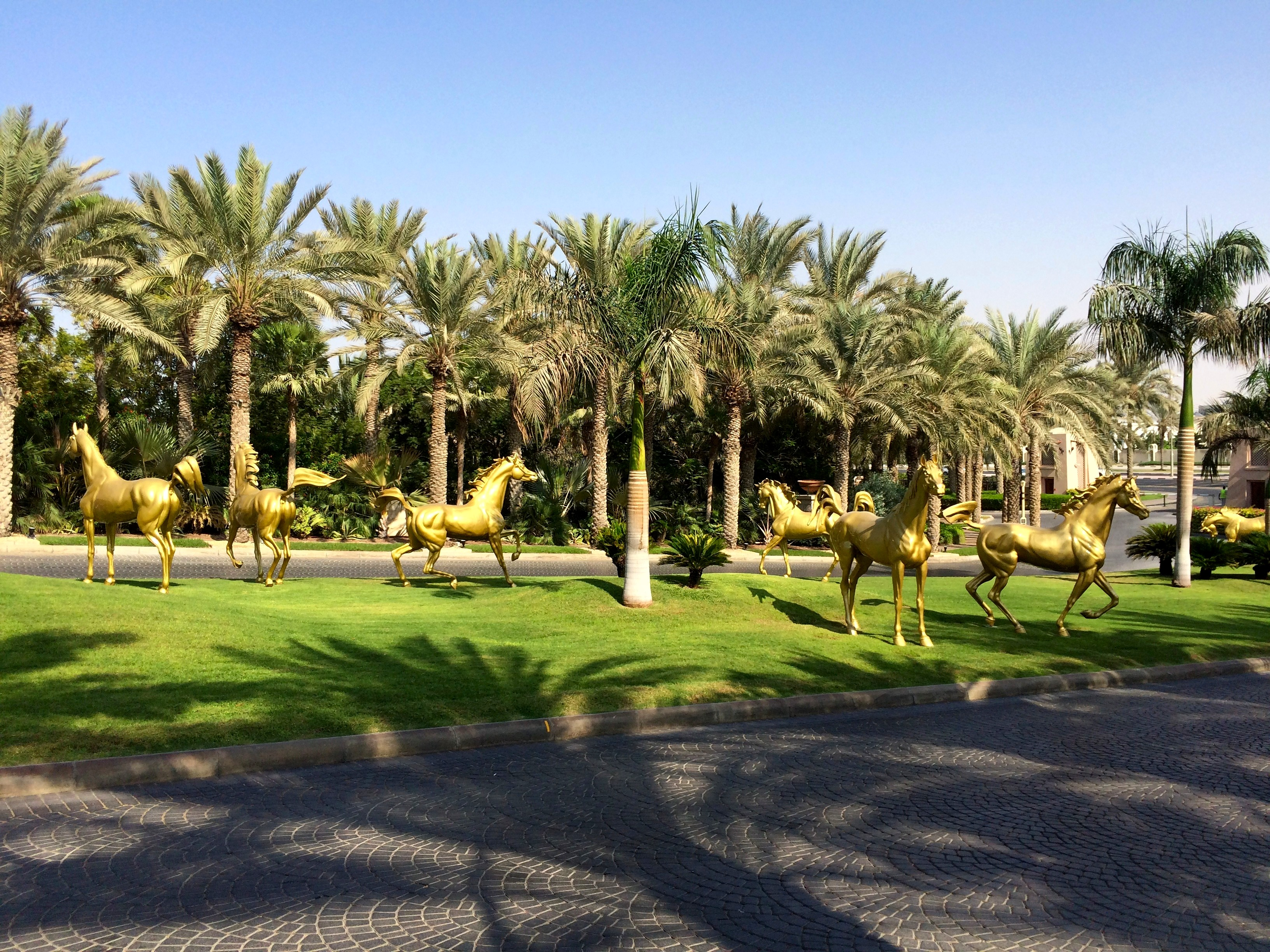
Golden Horses by South African sculptor Danie de Jager

Art in Dubai

- DUCTAC
- Tashkeel Dubai

Public art in Dubai

- Golden Horses

Dress code in Dubai

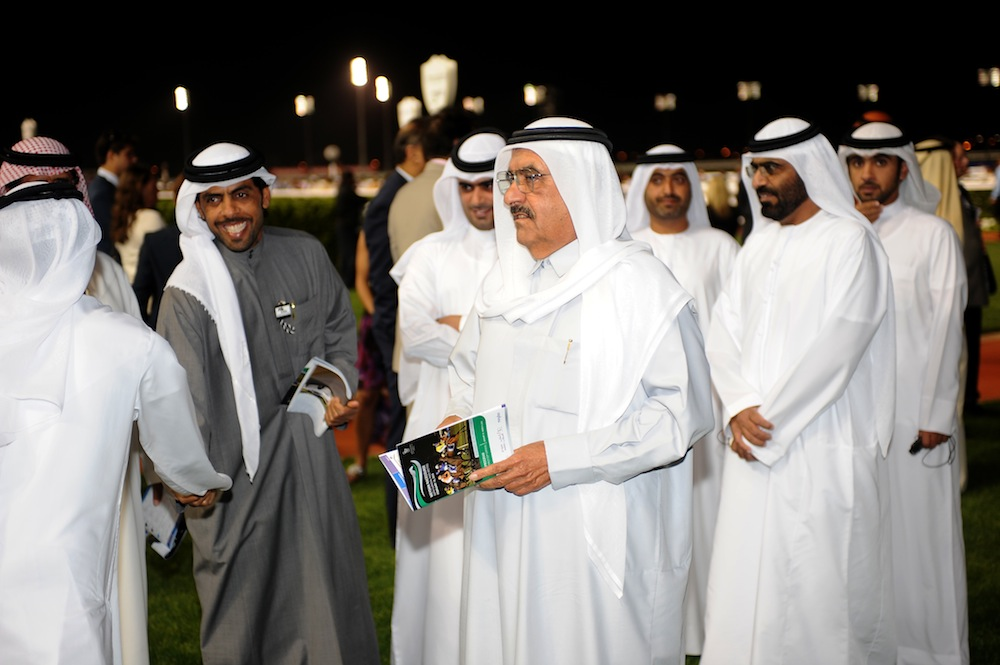
Men wearing the kandurah and the traditional ghotrah, held in place by an egal

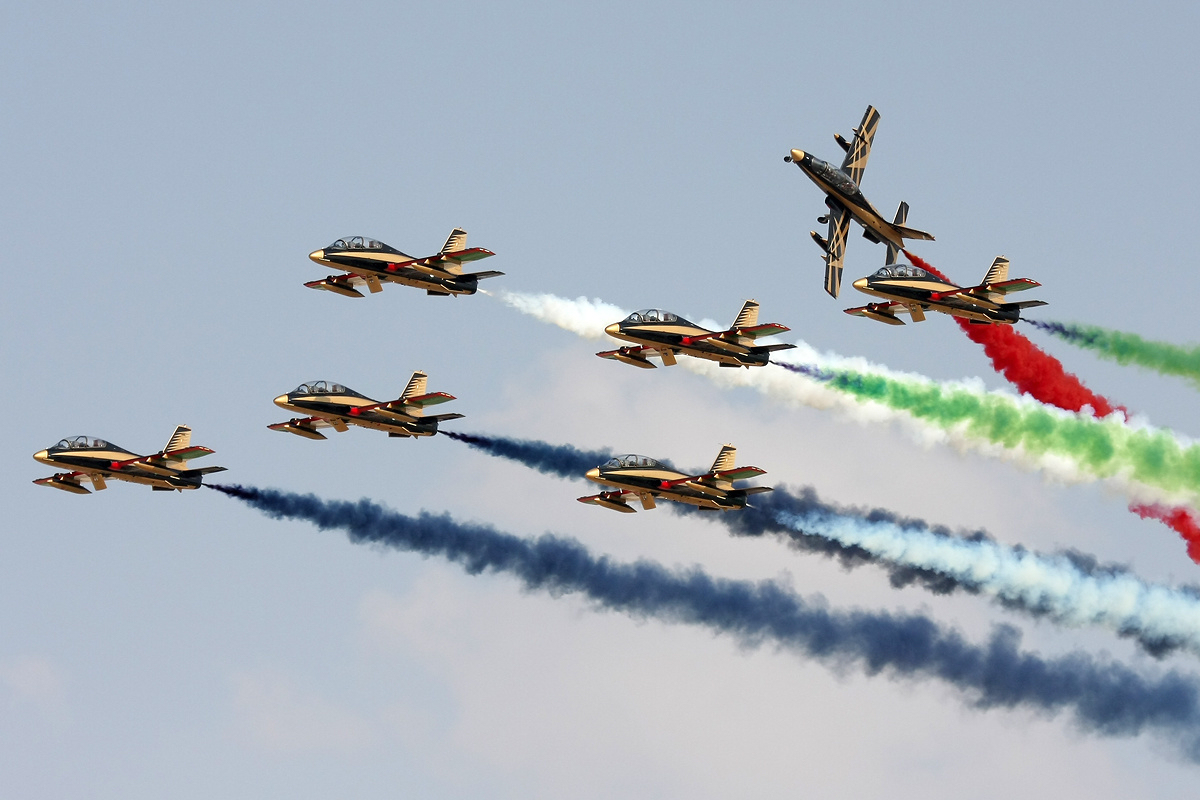
Al Fursan, the aerobatic demonstration team of the United Arab Emirates Air Force display at the 2013 Dubai Airshow

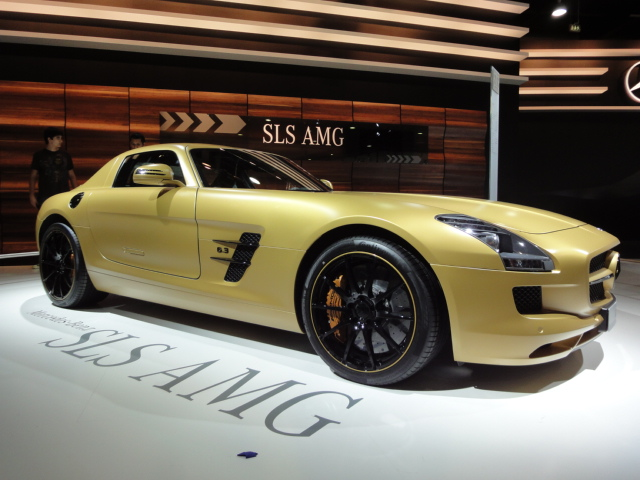
SLS AMG Desert Gold at the 10th Dubai Motor Show

Events in Dubai

- Art Dubai
- Dubai Airshow
- Dubai Design Week
- Dubai Motor Show
- Dubai Opera Ball
- Dubai Shopping Festival
- Expo 2020
- UAE Awafi Festival
- World Government Summit

Festivals in Dubai

- Dubai Motor Festival

Languages of Dubai

- English language
- Gulf Arabic

Media in Dubai

- Newspapers in Dubai
  - Al Bayan
  - Gulf News
- Radio and television in Dubai
  - Radio and television channels of Dubai

People from Dubai

- Juma al Majid

=== Religion in Dubai ===
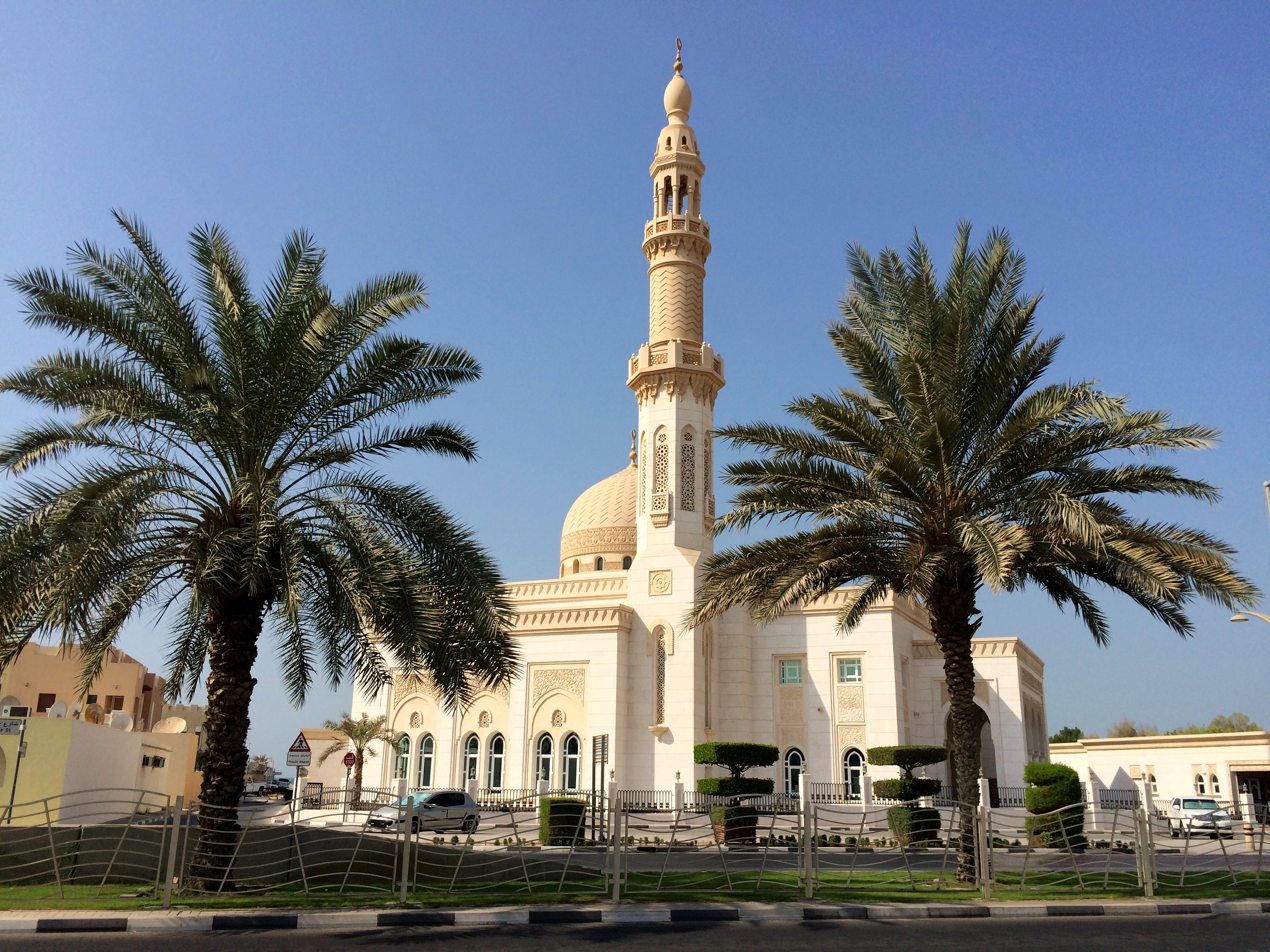
Marhaba Mosque

Religion in Dubai

- Catholicism in Dubai
  - St. Mary's Catholic Church
- Hinduism in Dubai
  - Hindu Temple
- Islam in Dubai
  - Grand Mosque
- Sikhism in Dubai
  - Guru Nanak Darbar

=== Sports in Dubai ===
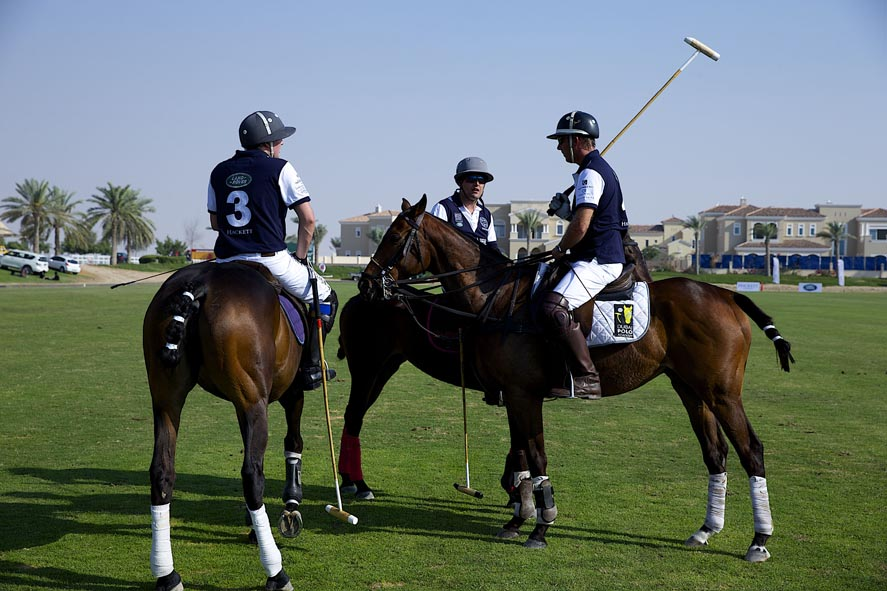
British Polo Day at the Dubai Polo & Equestrian Club

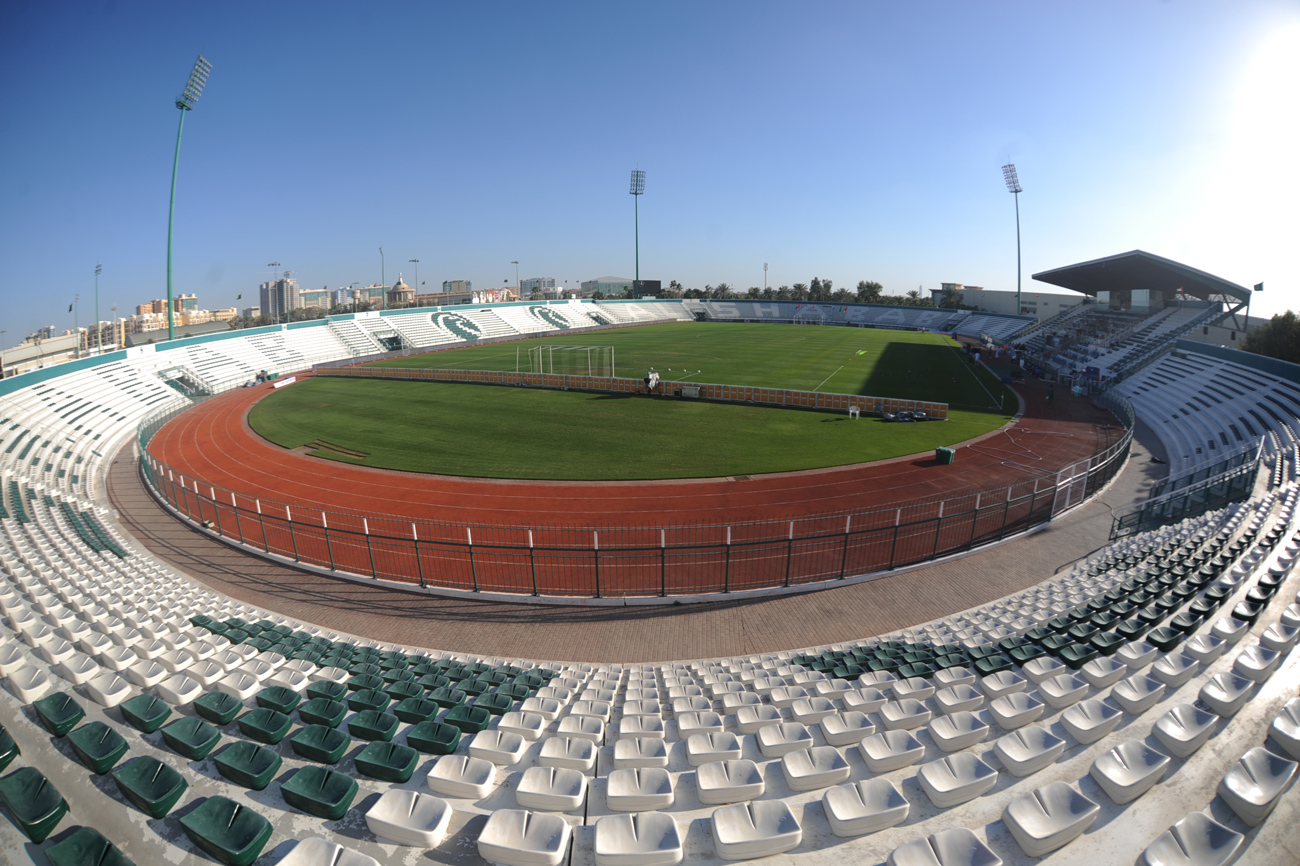
Maktoum bin Rashid Al Maktoum Stadium

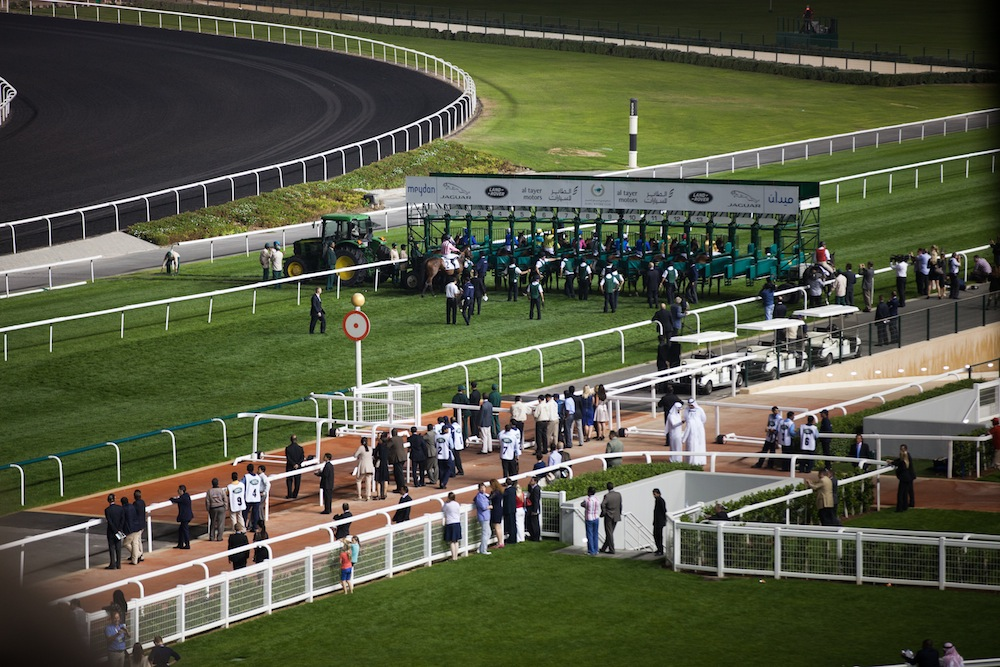
Meydan Racecourse

Sport in Dubai

- Football in Dubai
  - Association football in Dubai
    - Al-Nasr Dubai SC
    - Al-Wasl F.C.
- Polo in Dubai
- Sports competitions in Dubai
  - Dubai Desert Classic
  - Dubai International Rally
  - Dubai Marathon
  - Dubai Open (golf)
  - Dubai Open Chess Tournament
  - Dubai Tennis Championships
  - Dubai Tour
  - Dubai World Cup
  - Dubai World Cup Night
- Sports venues in Dubai
  - DSC Indoor Arena
  - DSC Multi-Purpose Stadium
  - Dubai Creek Golf & Yacht Club
  - Dubai International Cricket Stadium
  - Emirates Golf Club
  - Hamdan Sports Complex
  - Maktoum bin Rashid Al Maktoum Stadium
  - Meydan Racecourse

== Economy and infrastructure of Dubai ==
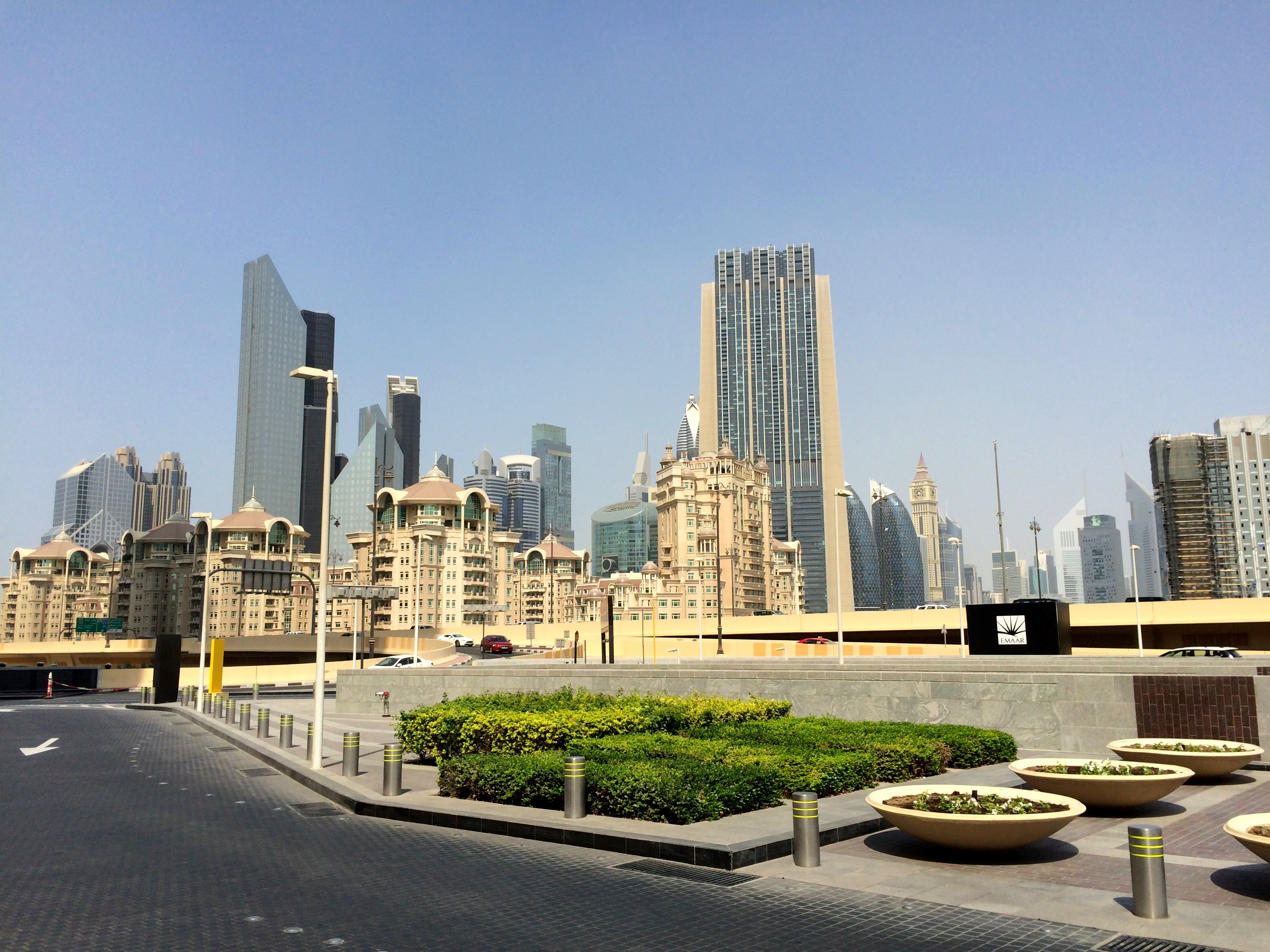
Dubai International Financial Centre, a major financial hub for the Middle East

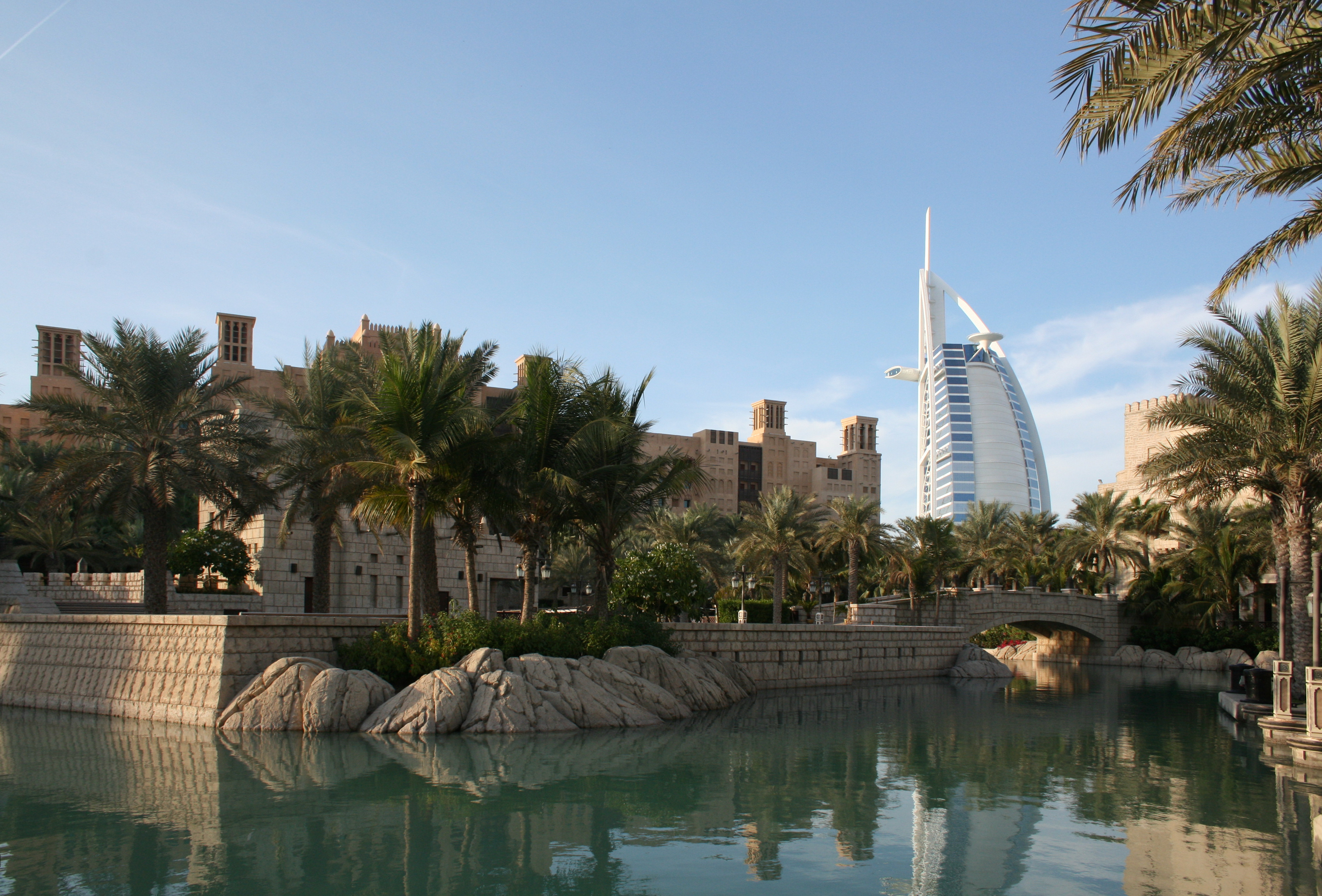
Madinat Jumeirah, the largest resort in Dubai

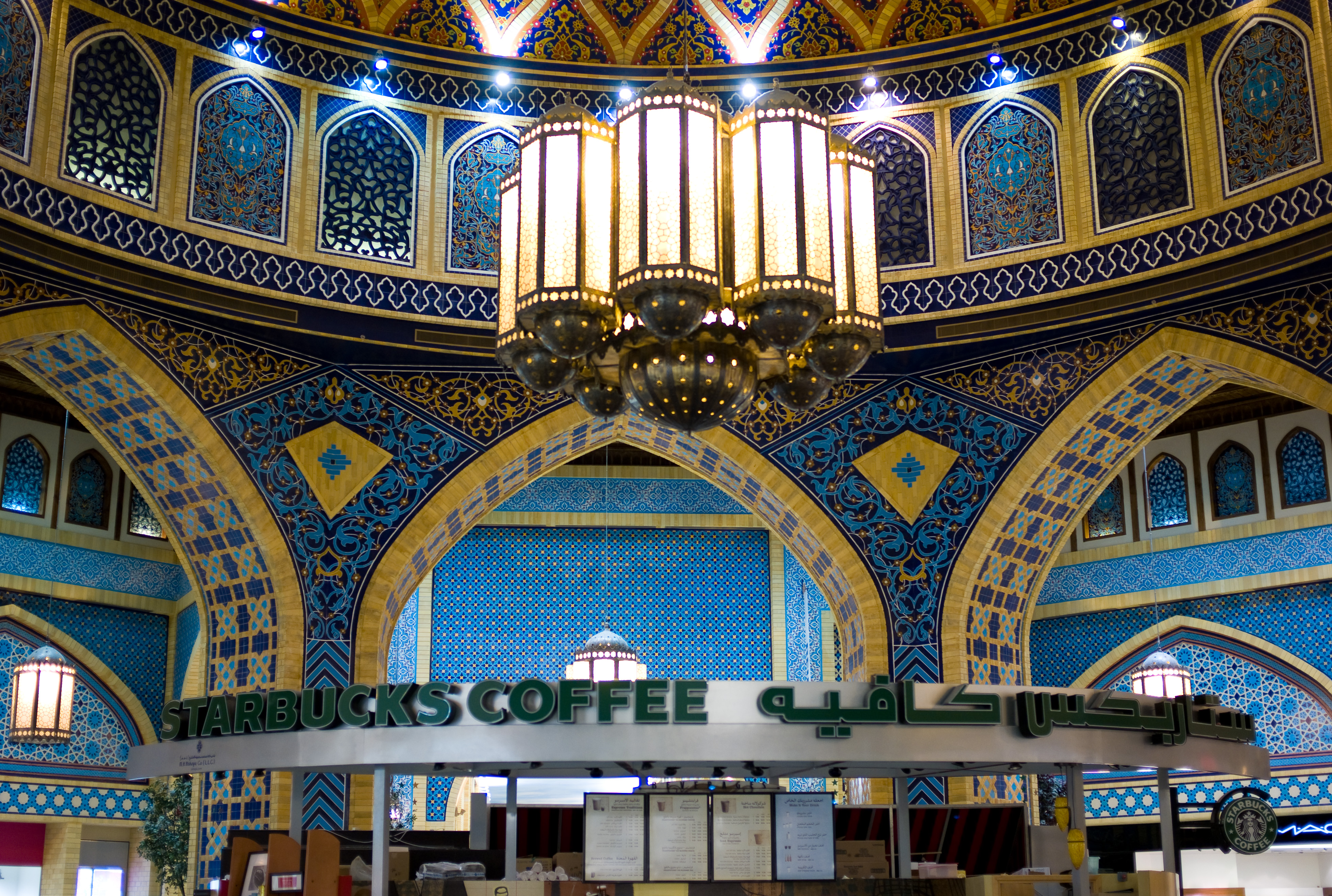
The Persian Court at Ibn Battuta Mall

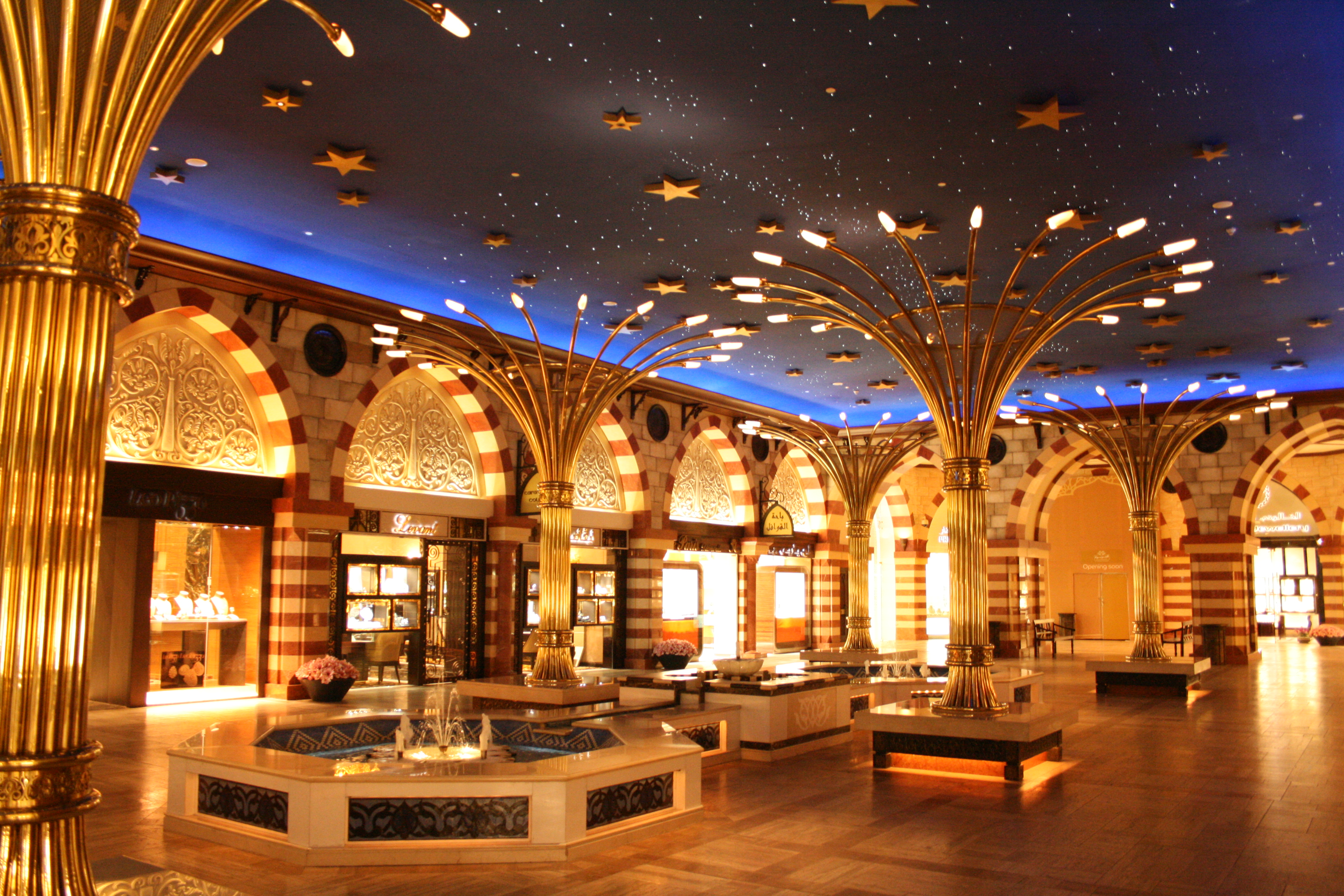
The Dubai Mall's Gold Souk

Economy of Dubai

- Communications in Dubai
- Financial services in Dubai
  - Dubai Financial Market
  - Emirates NBD
- Hotels and resorts in Dubai
  - The Address Downtown Dubai
  - Atlantis, The Palm
  - Burj Al Arab
  - Hatta Fort Hotel
  - Jumeirah Beach Hotel
  - Jumeirah Emirates Towers Hotel
  - JW Marriott Marquis Dubai
  - Madinat Jumeirah
  - Rose Rayhaan by Rotana
  - Ski Dubai
  - Tamani Hotel Marina
- Real estate and property in Dubai
  - Developments in Dubai
    - Development projects in Dubai
- Restaurants and cafés in Dubai
  - Rustar Floating Restaurant
  - Verre
- Shopping malls and markets in Dubai
  - Shopping malls in Dubai
    - Ibn Battuta Mall
    - City Centre Deira
    - Mall of the Emirates
    - The Dubai Mall
  - Souks in Dubai
    - Dubai Gold Souk
    - Dubai Spice Souk
    - Dubai Textile Souk
- Tourism in Dubai
  - Tourist attractions in Dubai

=== Transportation in Dubai ===
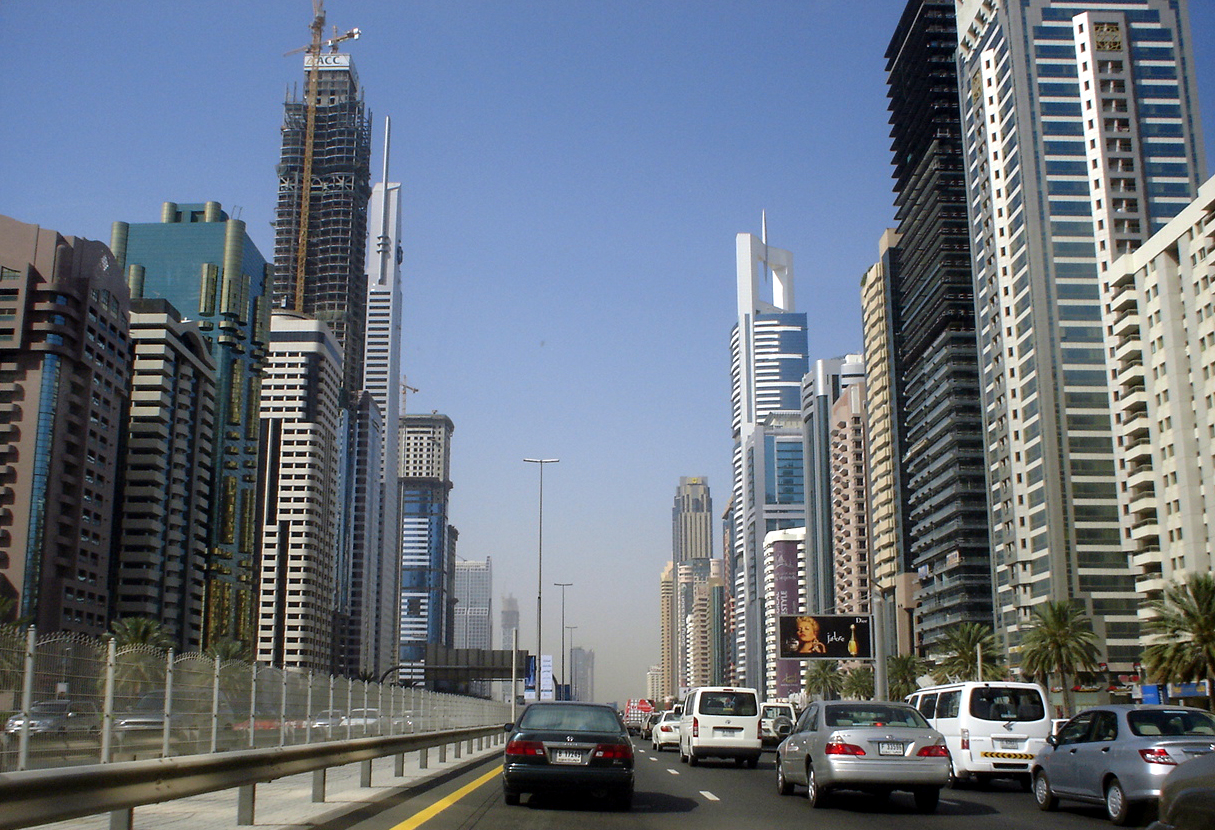
Sheikh Zayed Road

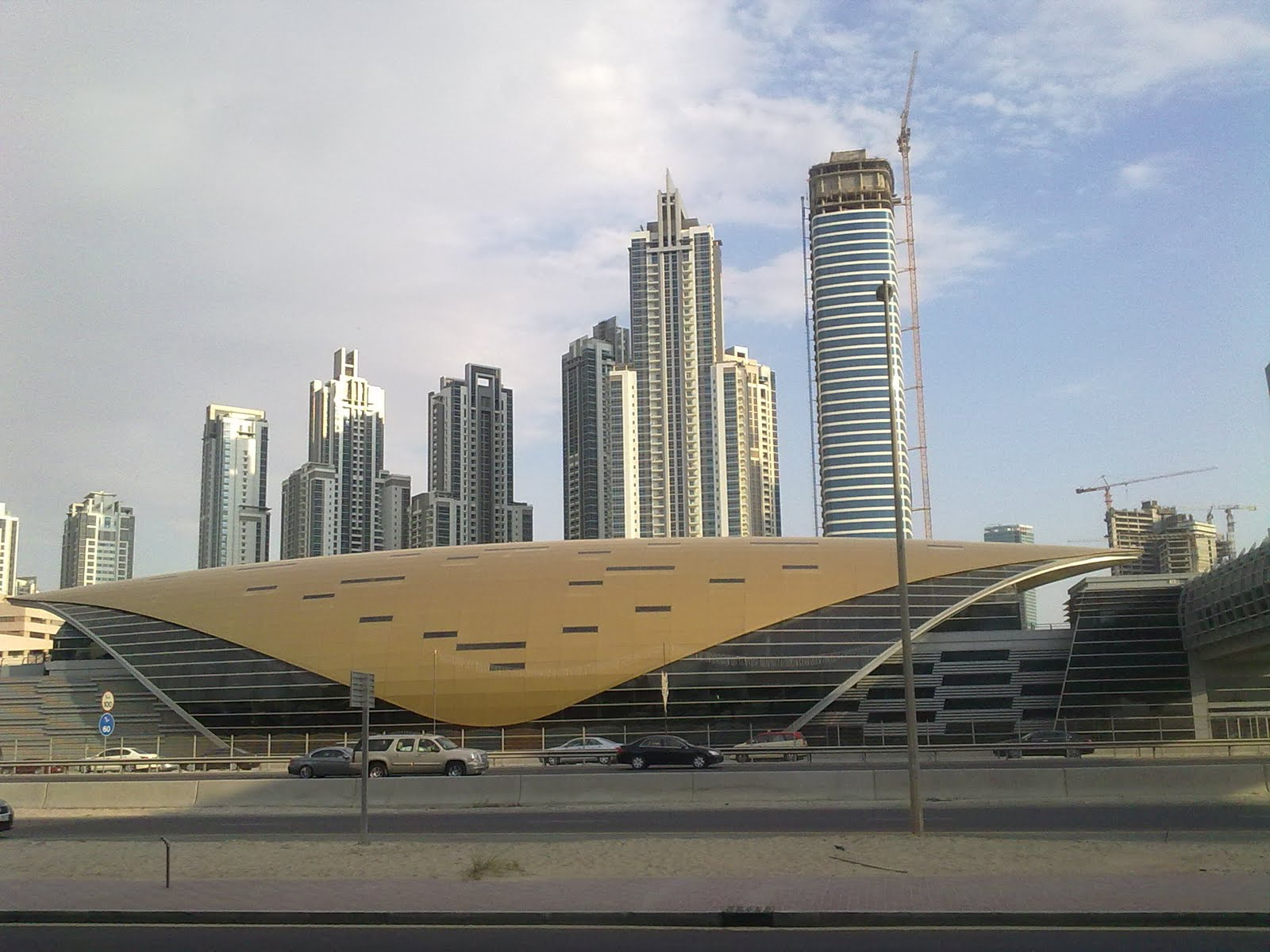
Business Bay metro station

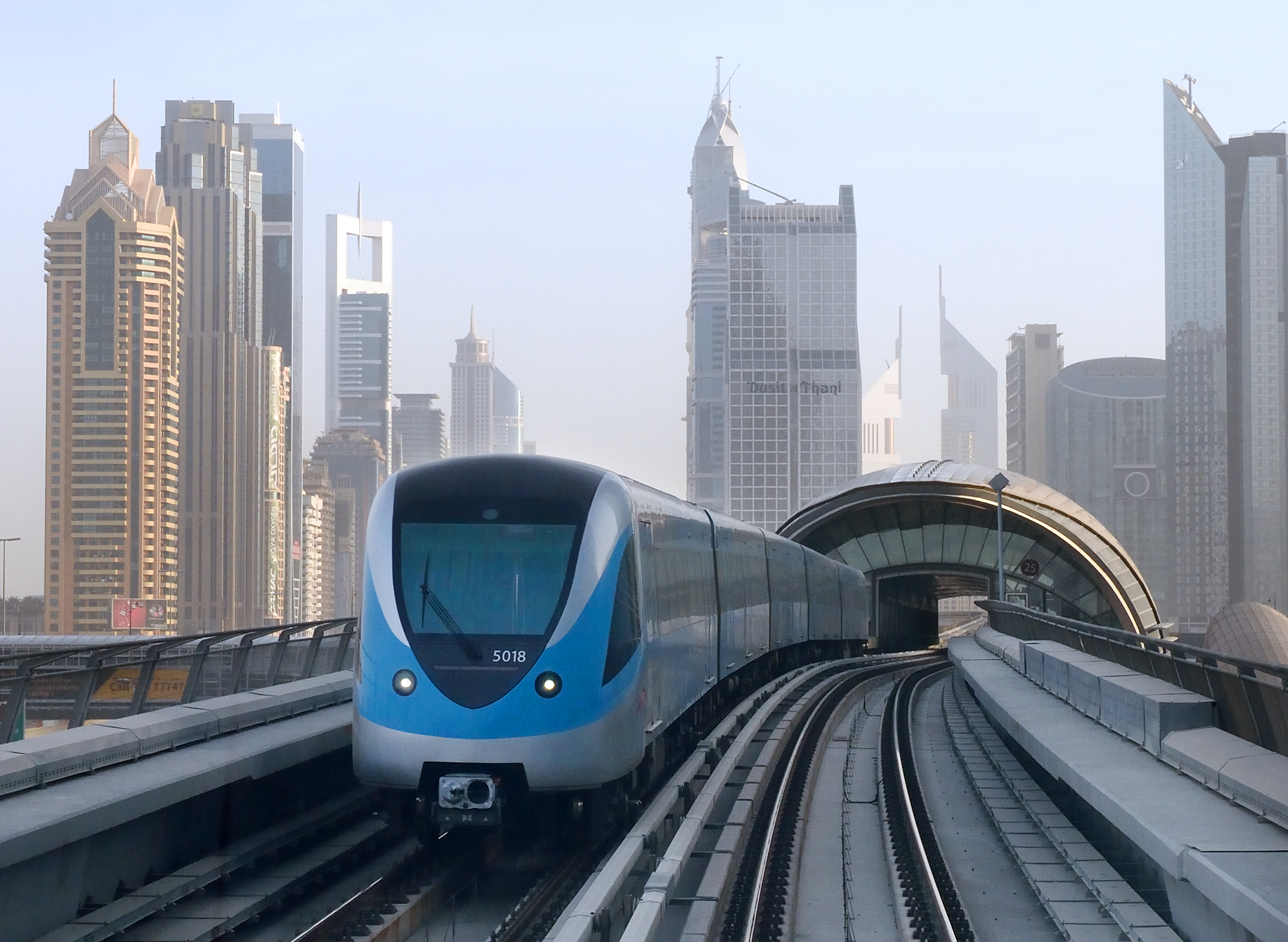
Dubai Metro Red Line

Public transport in Dubai

- Air transport in Dubai
  - Airports in Dubai
    - Dubai International Airport
      - Dubai International Airport Cargo Gateway
    - Al Maktoum International Airport
- Maritime transport in Dubai
  - Jebel Ali
  - Port Rashid
- Road transport in Dubai
  - Dubai route numbering system
    - Roads in Dubai
      - Sheikh Zayed Road

==== Rail transport in Dubai ====
Rail transport in Dubai

- Dubai Metro
  - Red Line
  - Green Line
  - Purple Line (proposed line)
  - Blue Line (proposed line)
    - List of Dubai Metro railway stations
- Dubai Tram
- Dubai Trolley
- Palm Jumeirah Monorail

== Education in Dubai ==
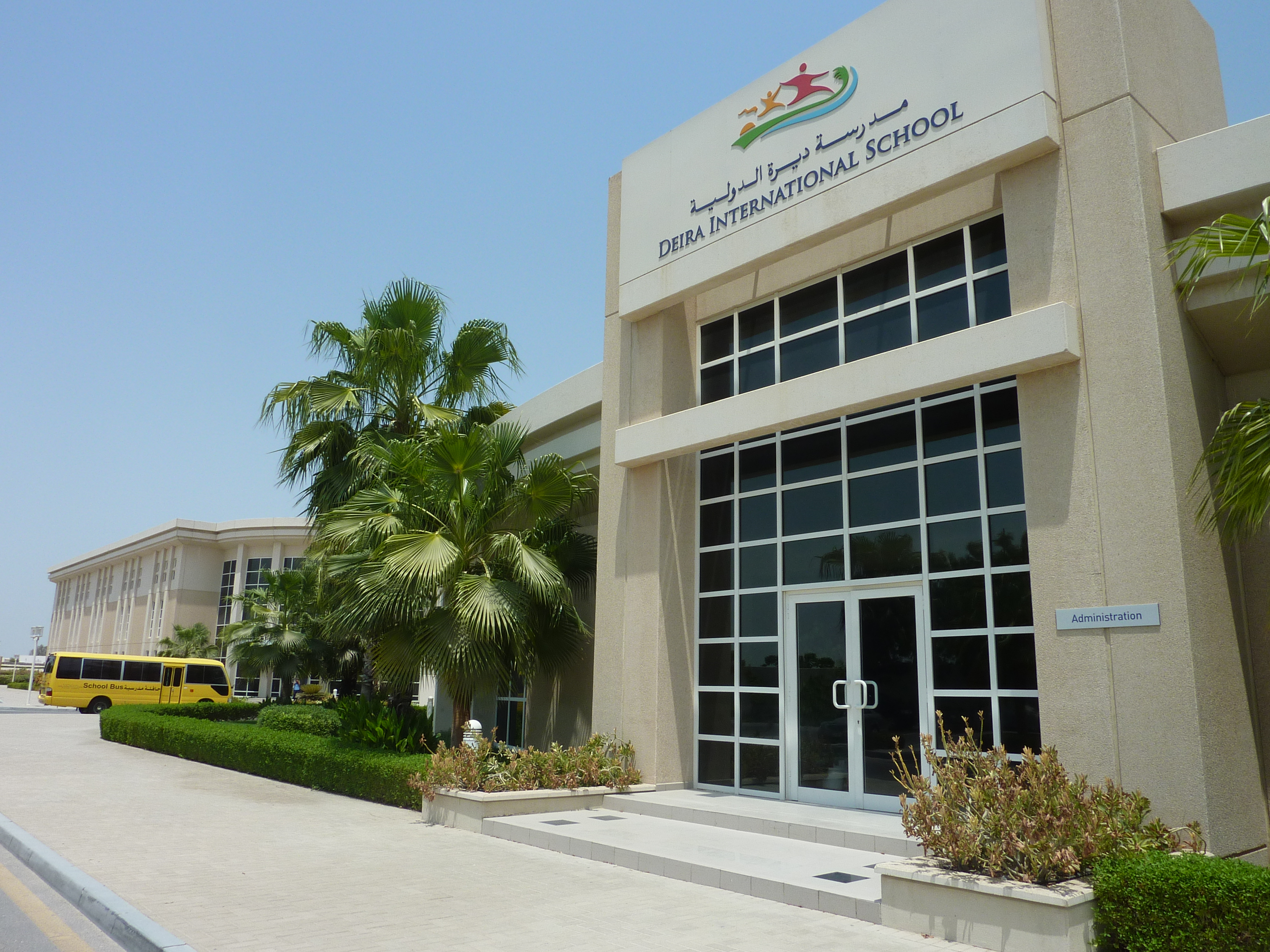
Deira International School

Education in Dubai

- Schools in Dubai
  - Public Schools in Dubai
  - Private Schools in Dubai
- Universities and colleges in Dubai
  - Public universities and colleges
    - Higher Colleges of Technology
    - Zayed University
  - Private universities and colleges
    - American University in the Emirates
    - British University in Dubai
    - University of Dubai
    - Zayed University

== Healthcare in Dubai ==
Healthcare in Dubai

- Hospitals in Dubai
  - Dubai Hospital
  - Rashid Hospital

== See also ==
- Outline of geography
