= Public Schools in Dubai =

This is the list of the schools in Dubai owned by the Dubai Government - Public Schools.

KHDA ratings of Public Dubai schools are listed below. The list is arranged by ratings for the year 2010–2011; within each rating level schools are listed alphabetically.

School name	2010-2011	2009-2010	2008-2009	Curriculum
Al Arqam Private School	Acceptable	Acceptable	Acceptable	MOE
Al Basateen Kindergarten, Al Khawaneej	Acceptable	Acceptable	Acceptable	MOE
Al Rashid Al Saleh Private School	Acceptable	Acceptable	Acceptable	MOE
Al Shorouq Private School	Acceptable	Acceptable	Unsatisfactory	MOE
Al Thuraya Private School	Acceptable	Acceptable	Acceptable	MOE
Dubai Modern Education School	Acceptable	Acceptable	Acceptable	MOE/US
Dubai Police Children Kindergarten, Bur Dubai	Acceptable	Acceptable	Acceptable	MOE
Dubai Police Kindergarten, Deira Branch	Acceptable	Acceptable	Acceptable	MOE
International Academic School	Acceptable	Acceptable	Acceptable	MOE/US
Islamic School for Education and Training	Acceptable	Acceptable	Acceptable	MOE
National Charity School	Acceptable	Acceptable	Acceptable	MOE
New World Private School	Acceptable	Acceptable	Acceptable	MOE
Al Basateen KG Hatta	Unsatisfactory	Unsatisfactory	Unsatisfactory	MOE
Al Falah Model Private School	Unsatisfactory	Unsatisfactory	Unsatisfactory	MOE
Al Hesn Private School	Unsatisfactory	Unsatisfactory	Unsatisfactory	MOE/US

Data collected from KHDA News report.

Official Reports can be found at KHDA site.
