= Human rights in Dubai =

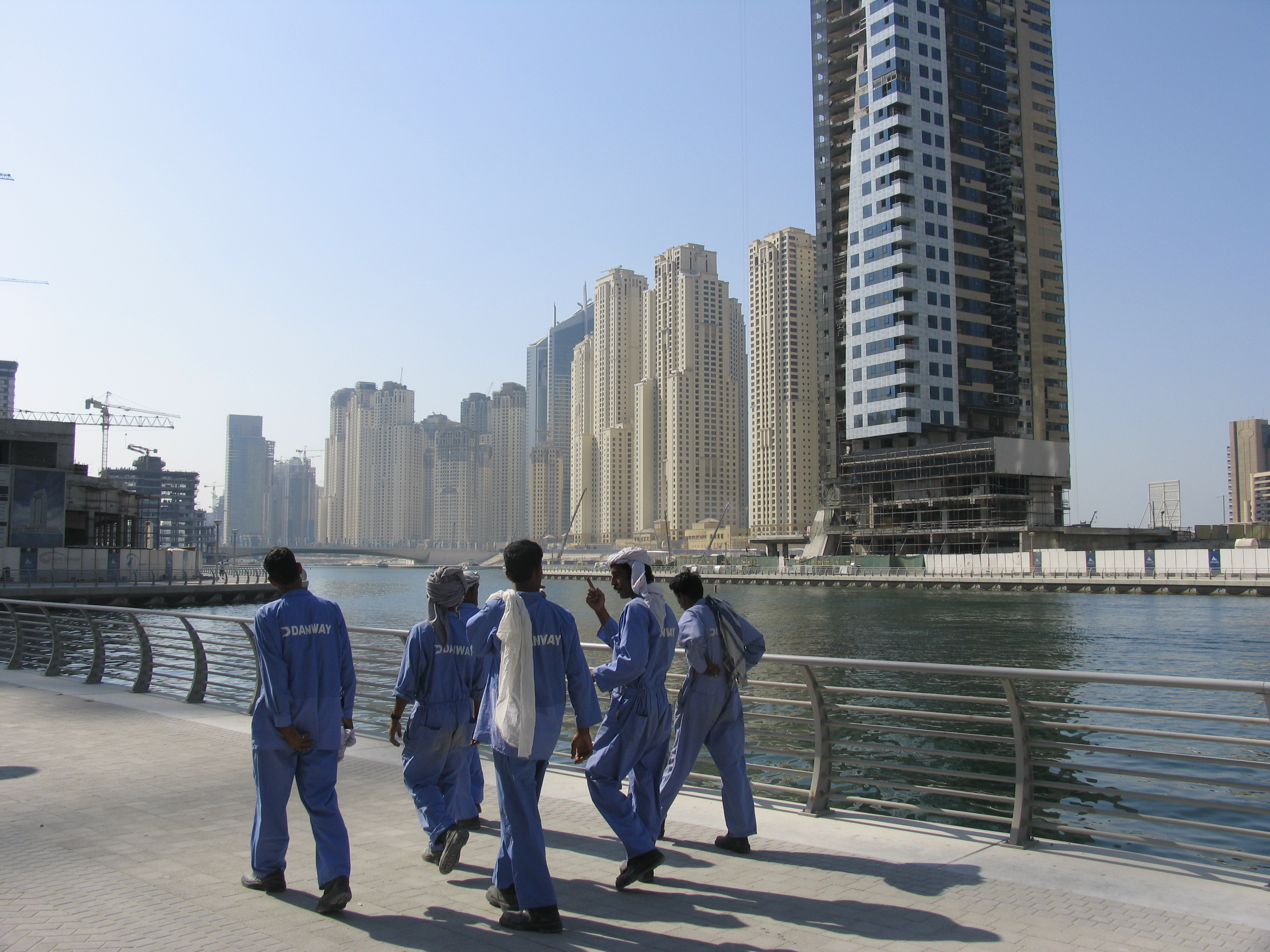
Dubai has many workers from foreign countries, who have worked on real estate development projects such as the Dubai Marina.

Human rights in Dubai are based on the Constitution and enacted law, which promise equitable treatment of all people, regardless of race, nationality or social status, per Article 25 of the Constitution of the United Arab Emirates. Despite this, Freedom House has stated: "Extreme forms of self-censorship are widely practiced, particularly regarding issues such as local politics, culture, religion, or any other subject the government deems politically or culturally sensitive. The Dubai Media Free Zone (DMFZ), an area in which foreign media outlets produce print and broadcast material intended for foreign audiences, is the only arena where the press operates with relative freedom."

Human rights organizations have expressed concern about violation of human rights in Dubai. Most notably, some of the 250,000 foreign laborers in the city allegedly live in conditions described by Human Rights Watch as "less than humane". The mistreatment of foreign workers was a subject of the 2009 documentary, Slaves of Dubai.

== Foreign workers and labour rights ==
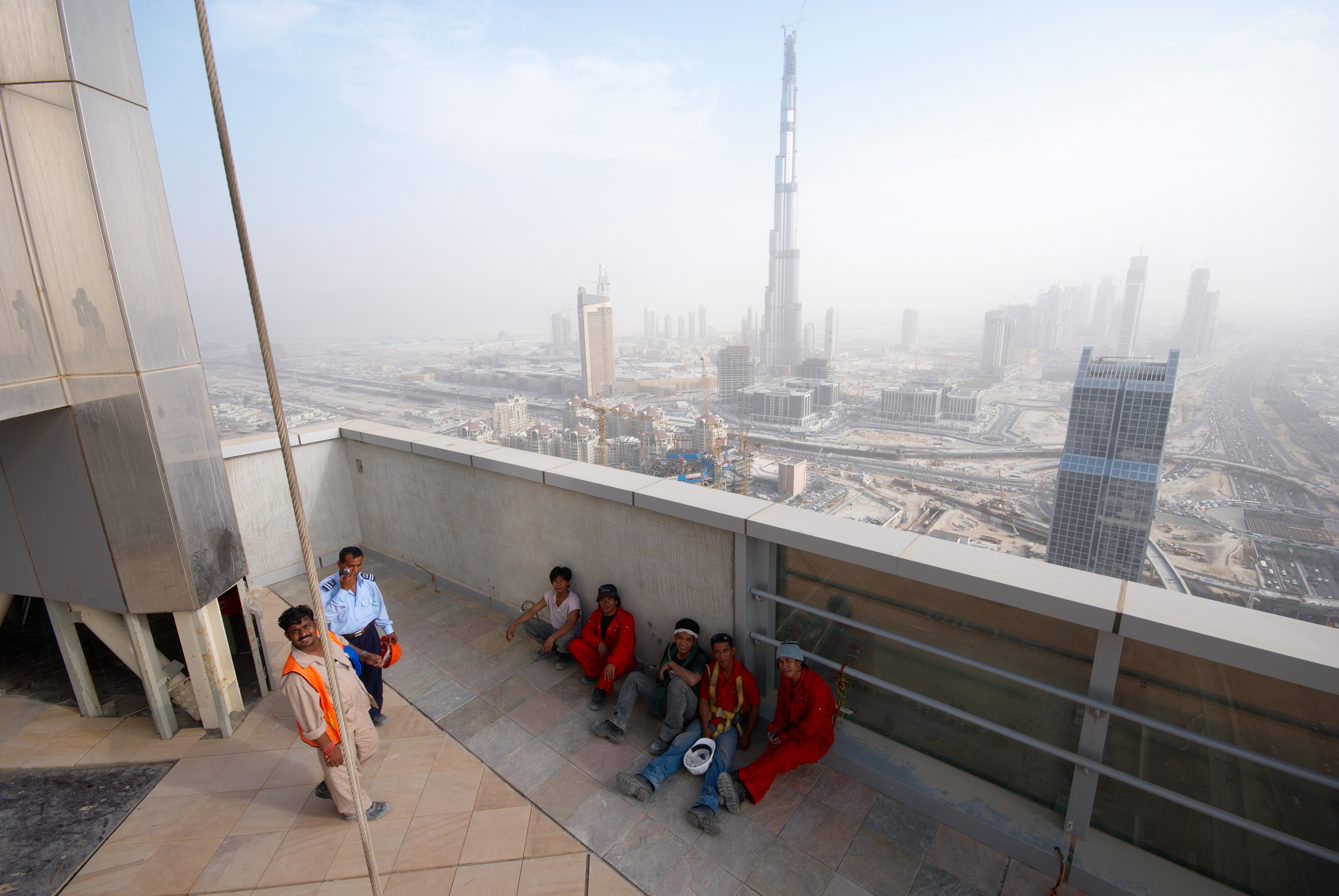
Construction workers from Asia on top floor of the Angsana Tower

Article 25 of the Constitution of the UAE provides for the equitable treatment of persons with regard to race, nationality, religious beliefs or social status. Foreign laborers in Dubai often live in conditions described by Human Rights Watch as being "less than humane", and was the subject of the documentary, Slaves of Dubai. A 2006 NPR report quoted Baya Sayid Mubarak, the Indian consul for labor and welfare in Dubai, as saying: "the city's economic miracle would not be possible without armies of poorly paid construction workers from the Indian sub-continent". The NPR report stated that foreign construction workers lived "eight and ten to a room in labor camps" and that "many are trapped in a cycle of poverty and debt, which amounts to little more than indentured servitude."

BBC News has reported that: "local newspapers often carry stories of construction workers allegedly not being paid for months on end. They are not allowed to move jobs and if they leave the country to go home they will almost certainly lose the money they say they are owed." Additionally, some of the workers have allegedly been forced to give up their passports upon entering Dubai, making it difficult to return home. In September 2005, the Minister of Labour ordered one company to pay unpaid salaries within 24 hours after workers protested and published the name of the offending company.

In December 2005, the Indian consulate in Dubai submitted a report to the Government of India detailing labor problems faced by Indian expatriates in the emirate. The report highlighted delayed payment of wages, substitution of employment contracts, premature termination of services and excessive working hours as being some of the challenges faced by Indian workers in the city.

On 21 March 2006, workers at the construction site of Burj Khalifa, upset over bus timings and working conditions, rioted, damaging cars, offices, computers, and construction tools. The Great Recession affected the working class of Dubai, with many workers not being paid but also being unable to leave the country.

The city's discriminatory legal system and unequal treatment of foreigners has been brought to light by its attempts to cover up information on the 2007 rape of a 15-year-old French-Swiss national, by three locals, one of whose HIV-positive status was hidden by the authorities for several months; and by the recent mass imprisonment of migrant laborers, most of whom were from Asia, on account of their protests against poor wages and living conditions. Despite protests by Human Rights Watch and several governments, companies allegedly continue to take the passports of workers and refuse to pay promised salaries. These practices have been labeled as "modern slavery" by some organizations. In 2013, a Norwegian woman, Marte Dalelv, was arrested and jailed on charges of adultery, perjury, and consuming alcohol after reporting a colleague for raping her. She was sentenced to 16 months in prison, but was pardoned the same month she was sentenced.

In 2012, a workers' camp in Sonapur had their water cut for 20 days and electricity for 10 days, as well as no pay for three months. They were told that they had been forewarned that the lease was about to expire, and their option was to go to the Sharjah camp, which the workers did not want to do because it was "very dirty and [had] a foul smell.

Prior to the mid 2000s, camel owners made use of child jockeys, most of whom were kidnapped from other parts of the world. After international outcry, the country decided to slowly put an end to this practice. There are still, however, some violations of this ban.

There are various examples of local folk ill-treating people, just on the basis of nationality or race. In one instance, a local taxi passenger caused a serious injury to a foreign driver. The passenger would not follow the driver's instructions to wear his seatbelt and not eat in taxi, and gave the reason that he was an Emirati (Emiratis being the native population and citizens of the United Arab Emirates).

The problem of stateless people (known as Bidoon) has been around for many years. Many have languished without proper care, even though many of them are natives of the land. These people have not been able to complete their education, secure jobs and have found it hard to marry. A small number of them have been able to acquire UAE nationality or that of Comoros Island.

== Dubai law ==
While Homosexuality is criminalized, the United Arab Emirates 2023 Human Rights report issued by the U.S. State Department stated that there were no known reports of arrests or prosecutions for consensual same-sex sexual conduct, nor of violence against LGBTQI+ individuals.

Kissing in public places is illegal, even for married heterosexual couples. The law is strictly enforced: Expats in Dubai are deported for kissing in public, while Emiratis face imprisonment or a fine. A single complainant's testimony is enough for conviction. A British man jailed and deported for an "innocuous peck on the cheek" stated that his conviction was based only on a two-year-old child as eyewitness, while his four defense witnesses were not even heard at court.

Dubai has a modest dress code. The dress code is part of Dubai's criminal law. Sleeveless tops and short dresses are not allowed at Dubai's malls. Clothes must be in appropriate lengths.

Apostasy is a crime punishable by death in the UAE; in practice this has never been applied. UAE incorporates hudud crimes of Sharia law into its Penal Code – apostasy being one of them. Article 1 and Article 66 of UAE's Penal Code requires hudud crimes to be punished with the death penalty, therefore apostasy is punishable by death in the UAE.

Non-Muslim expatriates can be liable to Sharia rulings on marriage, divorce and child custody. Emirati women must receive permission from male guardian to marry and remarry. The requirement is derived from Sharia, and has been federal law since 2005. In all emirates, it is illegal for Muslim women to marry non-Muslims. In the UAE, a marriage union between a Muslim woman and non-Muslim man is punishable by law, since it is considered a form of "fornication".

During the month of Ramadan, it is illegal to publicly eat, drink, or smoke between sunrise and sunset. Exceptions are made for pregnant women and children. The law applies to both Muslims and non-Muslims, and failure to comply may result in arrest. In 2008, a Russian woman was put on trial for drinking juice in public during the month of Ramadan. In 2021, Dubai authorities removed the need for restaurants to apply for permits to serve food during Ramadan fasting hours. With this, Dubai's Department of Economic Development (DED) also withdrew the requirement to place screens and curtains over mall courts and restaurants. However, eating in public is still not allowed.

Sharing a hotel room with the opposite sex is prohibited under Dubai's law unless married or closely related. There is to be no display of public affection. Taking pictures of women without their consent is also prohibited.

The extradition process in the UAE is governed by federal law as well as bilateral treaties the UAE has established with other nations. A crucial factor in assessing an extradition request is the principle of dual criminality. According to this principle, the offense for which extradition is requested must be considered a crime in both the requesting country and the UAE. Therefore, if the alleged offense is not recognized as a crime under UAE law, the extradition request may be rejected.

== Religious freedom ==
Islam is the official religion in Dubai. A policy of religious toleration allows non-Muslims to practice their faith in a private residence or official place of worship, or they can petition the government for a land grant and permission to build a religious institution to hold religious services, which may be a slow process.

Thirteen Christian Churches exist, along with facilities for Hindus, Sikhs, and Bahá'ís. Non-Muslim groups are generally allowed to meet and advertise their events, but the law prohibits and punishes proselytizing.

There is also a Jewish synagogue in the Al Wasl district area of Dubai.

== Freedom of expression ==
Human rights groups have expressed concerns about freedom of expression in Dubai, which is often limited by enacted laws or Ministerial edicts in the name of protecting traditional Islamic morality or the image and reputation of Dubai and its leaders.

In 2007, the Dubai government shut down two Pakistani television channels, Geo News and ARY One. Their entertainment, but not news and political programming, were eventually permitted to broadcast in Dubai. The Dubai Ministry of Culture and Media banned the exhibition of a play, "Kholkhal", just hours before it was scheduled to be performed at the 8th annual Gulf Theater Festival. While journalists can no longer be jailed for doing their job, other legal actions can be taken against them. Several members of the Dubai press remain on a government list as being banned from being published within the Emirate. There is also reportedly a degree of self-censorship that occurs, for fear of governmental sanctions, of certain topics that are critical of government policy, the royal family, or may offend traditional Islamic morality.

In July 2013, a video was uploaded onto YouTube, which depicted a local driver hitting an expatriate worker, following a road related incident. Using part of his keffiyeh, the local driver whips the expatriate and also pushes him around, before other passers-by intervene. A few days later, Dubai Police announced that both the local driver and the person who filmed the video have been arrested. It was also revealed that the local driver was a senior UAE government official. The video once again brings into question the way that lower classes of foreign workers are treated. Police in November 2013 also arrested a US citizen and some UAE citizens, in connection with a YouTube parody video which allegedly portrayed Dubai and its youth in a bad light. The video was shot in areas of Satwa, Dubai and featured gangs learning how to fight each other using simple weapons, including shoes, the aghal, etc. Eventually, the US citizen was released; in a later interview with the BBC, the Sheikh of Dubai, Sheikh Mohammad mentioned that his treatment was unfair.

The Expo 2020 Dubai was cited as being used by the government as a front to clean the country's public image on the global platform in October 2021. The Human Right Watch called out the systematic violation of human rights committed by the Emirate. As per the report by HRW, critics of the government and human rights activists have been a constant target of the government and have been arrested and tortured in prisons, especially since 2015. Expo 2020 postponed to 2021 following the Covid-19 pandemic was organized to be held from October 1, 2021 to March 31, 2022, with a theme of "Connecting Minds, Creating the Future." In September 2021, the European Parliament in condemnation of the UAE government's repeated abuse of human rights pushed participating states to avoid taking part in the Expo.

A Citizen Lab report following the forensic analysis of the smartphones owned by Jamal Khashoggi's wife, Hanan Elatr, in December 2021 revealed that her devices were infected by spyware in April 2018. Hanan was detained as soon as she landed at the Dubai airport and interrogated for hours by the authorities. Her Android phones confiscated during interrogation were amongst other things like her laptop and passwords, which was infected with Israeli NSO Group spyware application, Pegasus, by the authorities to further spy on her in the months that followed. Allegedly, she was hacked exactly a few months before Khashoggi was murdered at the Saudi Arabian consulate in Istanbul, Turkey. Khashoggi, a renowned journalist at The Washington Post who wrote critical articles about the Saudi regime and its leadership, was murdered in October 2018, a few months after the reported hacking and spying of his wife.

=== 2007 censorship of two Pakistani satellite channels ===
On 16 November 2007 Tecom stopped broadcast of two major Pakistani satellite news channels, uplinked from Dubai Media City, which was initially marketed by Tecom under the tagline "Freedom to Create." The Dubai government had ordered Tecom to shut down the popular independent Pakistani news channels Geo News and ARY One World on the demand of Pakistan's military regime led by General Pervez Musharraf. This was implemented by du Samacom disabling their SDI & ASI streams. Later, policy makers in Dubai permitted these channels to air their entertainment programs, but news, current affairs and political analysis were forbidden. Although subsequently the conditions were removed, marked differences have since been observed in their coverage. This incident has had a serious impact on all organizations in the media city with Geo TV and ARY OneWorld considering relocation.

== Drug policy ==
Drugs found in urine or blood testing count as "possession" under UAE law. Raymond Bingham, BBC's DJ Grooverider, was sentenced to four years in prison after a pair of jeans in his luggage was found to contain just over 2 grams of marijuana. The Dubai authorities have been known to stop tourists on layovers at the airport and are now using extremely sensitive electronic detection equipment, including urine and blood screening, to search for traces of illegal substances. Keith Brown, a British national, was arrested on September 17, 2007 after authorities claim to have discovered a speck of cannabis on the bottom of one of his shoes. He has also been sentenced to four years in prison. Other tourists and residents have been sentenced to death for selling cannabis. However, there are no reports of anyone being executed in the UAE for solely drug offences, unlike neighboring Saudi Arabia. Another UK citizen, Tracy Wilkinson, was arrested and accused of being a "drugs baroness" in 2005 after authorities found codeine in her blood. Wilkinson has a bad back and received an injection of codeine at a Dubai hospital. She ended up spending two months in a cell where she contracted dysentery, head lice and an infestation of fleas before she was eventually released on bail. German television producer Cat Le-Huy was arrested in January 2008 for possessing a bottle of the over-the-counter hormone sleep aid Melatonin. Authorities claimed that some dirt in Le-Huy's luggage was hashish. A Vancouver resident named Bert Tatham was arrested at Dubai International Airport returning home from Afghanistan (where he was working with farmers to try to convince them not to grow poppies). The anti-narcotics officer was found to have two dead poppy bulbs and a tiny amount of hashish melted into the seams of one of his trouser pockets. After almost eight months in prison, he was eventually pardoned by President Mohammed bin Rashid Al Maktoum.

== Women's rights ==
In 2006, less than 20% of Emirati women were part of the national labor force. UAE has the second lowest percentage of local women working in the GCC. In 2008–2009, only 21% of Emirati women were part of the labor force. UAE has the highest percentage of total female labor participation in the GCC (including expatriate women). However, Kuwait has the highest percentage of local female labor participation in the GCC because more than 45% of Kuwaiti women are part of the national labor force. 80% of women in UAE are classified as household workers (maids).

The UAE's judicial system is derived from the civil law system and Sharia law. The court system consists of civil courts and Sharia courts. According to Human Rights Watch, UAE's civil and criminal courts apply elements of Sharia law, codified into its criminal code and family law, in a way which discriminates against women.

In June 2019, Princess Haya bint Hussein, the 45-year-old wife of Dubai's ruler Sheikh Mohammed bin Rashid Al Maktoum, reportedly fled from the royal family to Germany seeking political asylum, for an undisclosed reason. In July 2019, The Telegraph reported Sheikh Rashid Al Maktoum was fighting a divorce case in London. This is the third case in recent years of a close relative of Sheikh Mohammed escaping the royal family. Two of Sheikh Mohammed's daughters from another wife, Sheikha Latifa bint Mohammed Al Maktoum and Shamsa Al Maktoum, attempted an escape, with the former fleeing due to alleged abuse and house arrest at the royal palace.

After being last seen in a 16 February 2021 leaked video where Princess Latifa claimed of being held hostage by her father and Dubai's ruler Sheikh Mohammed bin Rashid Al Maktoum, a photo of her surfaced online in May 2021 from a shopping mall with two women. Sources later claimed that the women who posted regarding the night out with the princess were "paid" to do so. A total of three photographs emerged on social media showing Latifa at a restaurant called Bice Mare, as per the location tagged on social media. The United Nations human rights office had been demanding proof of her life from the UAE rulers since her disappearance and surfacing of the February 2021 video. According to the Dubai's law a husband is also permitted to beat his children and wife.

Ireland's travel guidelines were questioned by Radha Stirling, who called it "insufficient" to assist visitors, especially women, in understanding the reality of dealing with the Emirati authorities. Stirling had assisted Tori Towey, who was barred from leaving Dubai after being charged with attempt to suicide and illegal consumption of alcohol. Towey is a victim of domestic violence, who faced abuse since her marriage in March 2024. An Emirati police officer laughed at her, when she went for the first time to seek help. After her suicide attempt, Towey was taken to the police station instead of a hospital. Radha Stirling said it is challenging to explain people what will keep them safe in Dubai.

=== Rape victims ===
Rape victims are at risk of punishment for other "crimes" in Dubai. In a small number of cases, the courts of the UAE have jailed women after they reported being raped and it was proven that the accusations were false. A British woman, after she reported being gang raped by three men, was fined AED 1000 after confessing to consuming alcohol without a license; her attackers were sentenced to ten years in prison. Another British woman was charged with public intoxication and extramarital sex (with her fiancé, not the accused) after she reported being raped; in one final case, an 18-year-old Emirati woman withdrew her complaint of gang rape inside a car by 6 men when faced with a flogging and jail term. The woman served one year in jail for having consensual sex outside marriage with one of the men on a separate occasion.

In July 2013, a Norwegian woman, Marte Dalelv, reported being raped to the police and received a prison sentence for "illicit sex and alcohol consumption"; she was subsequently pardoned. The Emirates Center for Human Rights expressed concern over Dubai's treatment of rape victims.

== LGBT rights ==
Both Federal and Emirate law prohibit homosexuality and cross-dressing with punishment ranging from death, imprisonment, floggings, fines, deportation, chemical castration, forced psychological treatments, honor killings, vigilante executions, beatings, forced anal examinations, forced hormone injections, and torture.. However, the 2023 United Arab Emirates Human Rights Report issued by the U.S. State Department found no known cases of prosecutions against LGBTQI+ individuals.

== Prostitution ==
Prostitution in Dubai is illegal but still exists. Dubai is considered to have the most popular sex industry out of the UAE. Prostitution starts with pimps luring women from different parts of the world, like Eastern Europe, Central Asia, Southeast Asia, East Africa, Iraq, Iran, and Morocco. Pimps tell them they are going to be maids and then force them into prostitution. Each family is allowed a certain number of visas in order to hire foreign workers and the 'extra' foreign workers not needed by the family are sold to a middle man. Women have their passports taken away after they reach Dubai. It was reported that there were over 25,000 foreign prostitutes in the country. Women cannot report being forced into prostitution to the police because they would be arrested for engaging in illegal sex acts. In some cases, there are minors involved in the prostitution rings. In 2007, a news report reported that a total of 170 prostitutes were arrested, along with 12 pimps and 65 clients most of whom were from China.

In the early 1990s years, Dubai became famous in the United Arab Emirates as a place for the sex trade of Iranian women. Since 1990, Iranian women quickly became more popular throughout the Middle East for prostitution. The income of Iranian prostitutes in neighboring countries including Dubai is considered high but risky. Persian dance and twerking is usually requested from Iranian prostitutes.

== Forced disappearances and torture ==
UAE has escaped the Arab Spring; however, more than 100 Emirati activists were jailed and tortured because they sought reforms. Since 2011, the UAE government has increasingly carried out forced disappearances. Many foreign nationals and Emirati citizens have been arrested and abducted by the state, the UAE government denies these people are being held (to conceal their whereabouts), placing these people outside the protection of the law. According to Human Rights Watch, the reports of forced disappearance and torture in the UAE are of grave concern.

The Arab Organisation of Human Rights has obtained testimonies from many defendants, for its report on "Forced Disappearance and Torture in the UAE", who reported that they had been kidnapped, tortured and abused in detention centres. The report included 16 different methods of torture including severe beatings, threats with electrocution and denying access to medical care.

In 2013, 94 Emirati activists were held in secret detention centres and put on trial for allegedly attempting to overthrow the government. Human rights organizations have spoken out against the secrecy of the trial. An Emirati, whose father is among the defendants, was arrested for tweeting about the trial. In April 2013, he was sentenced to 10 months in jail.

Repressive measures were also used against people in order to justify the UAE government's claim that there is an "international plot" in which UAE citizens and foreigners were working together to destabilize the country. Foreign nationals were also subjected to a campaign of deportations. There are many documented cases of Egyptians and other foreign nationals who had spent years working in the UAE and were then given only a few days to leave the country.

Foreign nationals subjected to forced disappearance include two Libyans and two Qataris. Amnesty reported that the Qatari men have been abducted by the UAE government and the UAE government has withheld information about the men's fate from their families. Amongst the foreign nationals detained, imprisoned and expelled is Iyad El-Baghdadi, a popular blogger and Twitter personality. He was arrested by UAE authorities, detained, imprisoned and then expelled from the country. Despite his lifetime residence in the UAE, as a Palestinian citizen, El-Baghdadi had no recourse to contest this order. He could not be deported back to the Palestinian territories, therefore he was deported to Malaysia.

In 2012, Dubai police subjected three British citizens to beatings and electric shocks after arresting them on drugs charges. The British Prime Minister, David Cameron, expressed "concern" over the case and raised it with the UAE President, Sheikh Khalifa bin Zayed Al Nahyan, during his 2013 state visit to the UK. The three men were pardoned and released in July 2013.

In April 2009, a video tape of torture smuggled out of the UAE showed Sheikh Issa bin Zayed Al Nahyan torturing a man with whips, electric cattle prods, wooden planks with protruding nails and running him over repeatedly with a car. In December 2009 Issa appeared in court and proclaimed his innocence. The trial ended on 10 January 2010, when Issa was cleared of the torture of Mohammed Shah Poor. Human Rights Watch criticised the trial and called on the government to establish an independent body to investigate allegations of abuse by UAE security personnel and other persons of authority. The US State Department has expressed concern over the verdict and said all members of Emirati society "must stand equal before the law" and called for a careful review of the decision to ensure that the demands of justice are fully met in this case.

Ryan Cornelius, a British property developer, was detained in the UAE for 10 years in 2008 for defrauding the Dubai Islamic Bank. However, his sentence was extended for additional 20 years in 2018. In 2022, a UN working group declared it as arbitrary detention, while the UAE denied those claims. The Emirates claimed that it was lawful because Cornelius failed to repay the Dubai Islamic Bank. After 17 years of his detention, in December 2024, the case was discussed by the British PM Keir Starmer with the UAE officials, during his visit to Abu Dhabi. Starmer said Cornelius's case was important, and also raised other human rights concerns with the Emiratis. In January 2025, Cornelius's family and legal representatives requested David Lammy to place Mohammed Ibrahim Al Shaibani on the UK's sanctions list, accusing him of corruption and violation of Cornelius's fundamental human rights. If imposed, the sanctions would freeze Shaibani's assets in the UK. During a debate in the House of Commons on 5 December 2024, Iain Duncan Smith had also raised concerns regarding Cornelius's case, calling for his immediate release. Sir Iain urged the British government to impose Magnitsky sanctions on Shaibani and all individuals responsible for Cornelius's arbitrary detention and the seizure of his assets.

On 9 January 2025, Cornelius sent a letter to the Foreign Office via email, stating that he was denied basic facilities in the prison, including access to fresh air, despite his multiple medical conditions. Cornelius was also "coerced" by the Dubai prison authorities to sign a document, which was written in Arabic. The document mentioned that prisoners' human rights in the Dubai jail are not being violated. Cornelius could not fully understand it and refused to sign. It led to fears for his safety, and so he urged the Foreign Office to protect him from "aggressive" prison officials.

== See also ==
- LGBT rights in United Arab Emirates
- Human Rights
- Labor rights
