= Sustainability in Dubai =

Dubai is a city in the United Arab Emirates and is recognized as one of the fastest-growing cities in the world. This rapid urbanization has led to many environmental issues, because of the harsh environment, paucity of local resources such as food, water, and building materials, and the unplanned manner of expansion.

== Water ==
One major environmental issue in Dubai is potential water shortage. Dubai is among the cities with the lowest levels of precipitation. At the same time, the emirate is ranked among the top three countries in water usage, alongside the United States and Canada. Due to this fundamental conflict, water in Dubai comes mainly from energy-intensive desalination of sea water.

As climate change and human-induced greenhouse gas emissions have increasingly caused distorted weather patterns and unpredictable precipitation, farmers cannot access reliable water sources for irrigation. As a result, food prices are affected. Economic boom and population growth resulting from the discovery of oil in the UAE (1958) triggered increased demand for water that has ultimately led to water shortages. In the past, the UAE relied on desalination to respond to this increase of demand. There have been attempts to decrease demand for water in the UAE, such as increased fees for water usage.

In order to limit demand for and usage of electricity and water, prices have increased significantly for residents in Dubai. There are many developments being made in Dubai to maximize the utility of water available, such as The Sustainable City, a housing development where water and waste are recycled and residents pay rent that is similar to other nearby developments. It is also required that new buildings have solar water heaters. Per capita consumption of water and electricity has been falling as the population of Dubai continues to increase, which is promising for sustainability efforts being made. Recent efforts to address low levels of precipitation include meteorologists at Dubai's National Center of Meteorology & Seismology monitoring clouds and sending pilots to seed them with salt crystals to maximize their output of rain.

== Energy ==
Dubai is a major consumer of electricity. Their main source of electricity is natural gas, because it is cheaper than the alternatives. Many of the isolated buildings depend on large quantities of fossil fuel energy to support their large lighting and cooling needs.

== Development ==
Among the biggest problems facing Dubai is its rapid, unplanned manner of expansion. Other challenges have arisen as a result of rapid expansion, such as sewage treatment systems that have failed to keep up with development.

== Future problems ==
In the future, global warming will become a bigger issue, and this could be a huge problem for Dubai, because the country's population centres are located along the coast. Rising seas could lead to flooding, creating a problem for the city, as it would have few resources to counter the issue.

== See also ==
- Economy of Dubai
