= Dubai Motor Festival =

- Status: Active
- Genre: Auto show
- Frequency
- Location: Dubai
- Country: United Arab Emirates
- Inaugurated: 2013 (13 years ago)
- Organizer: Department of Tourism and Commerce Marketing (of Dubai)

The Dubai Motor Festival is an auto show launched by the Department of Tourism and Commerce Marketing of Dubai, United Arab Emirates, in 2013.

According to sources, around five hundred cars were paraded at the festival in a bid to promote tourism in the region.

== See also ==
- Economy of Dubai
- List of festivals in Asia
- Tourism in Dubai
- Transport in Dubai
