= History of the United Arab Emirates =

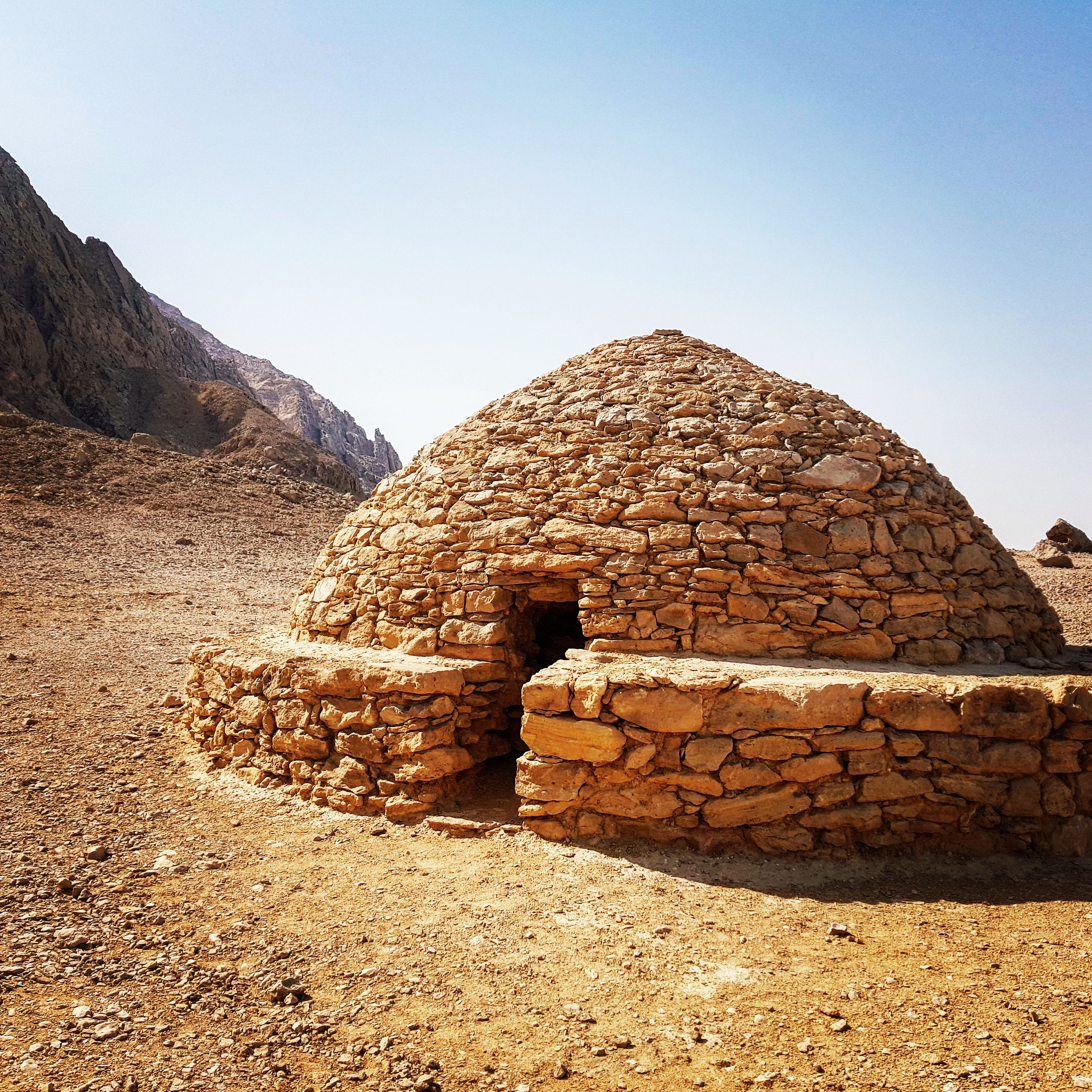
Hafit-era "beehive" tomb in Mezyad, Al-Ain's Jebel Hafeet Desert Park in the Eastern Region of Abu Dhabi

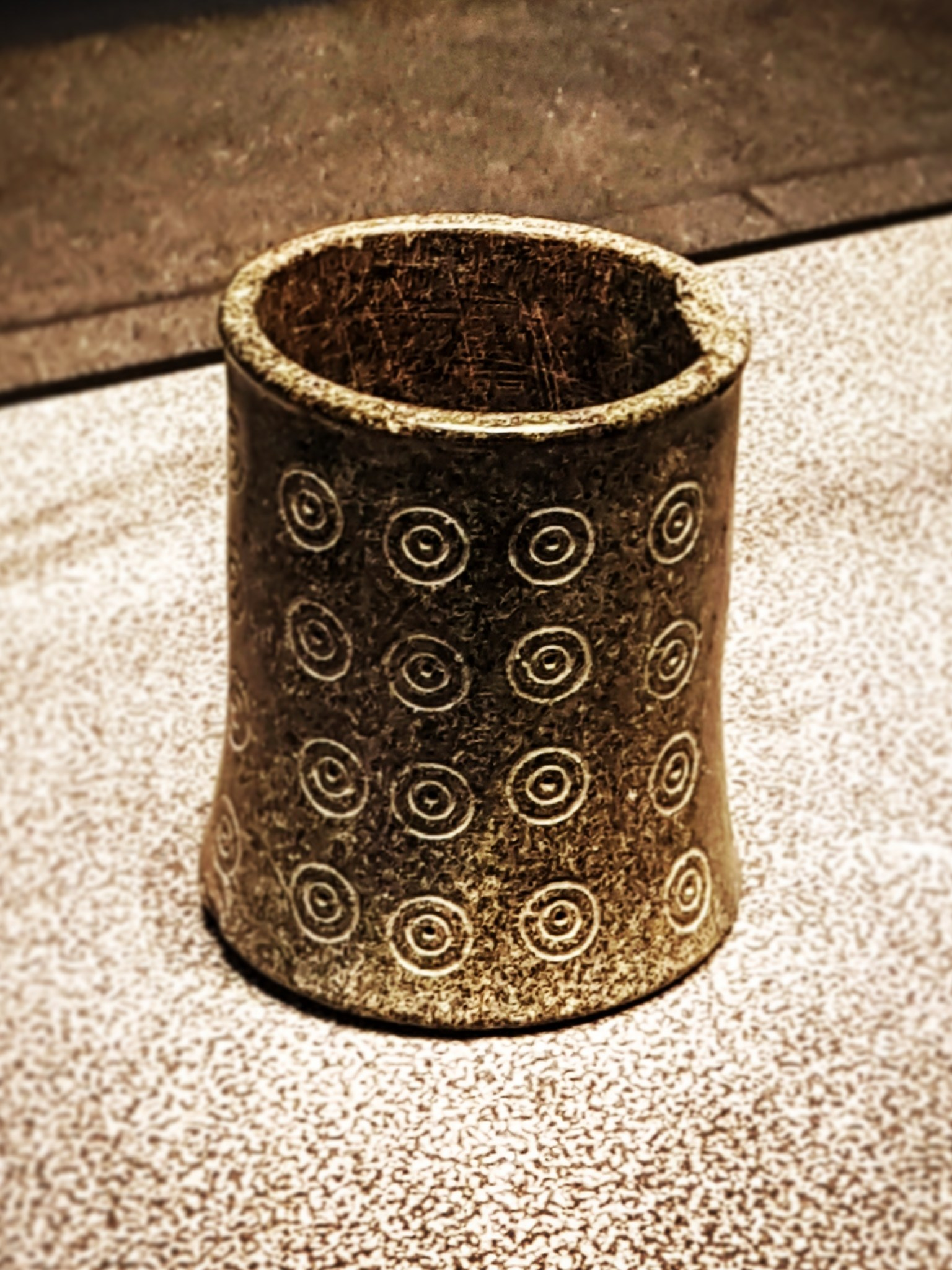
Decorated stone cup from the Umm Al Nar era on display at the Louvre Abu Dhabi.

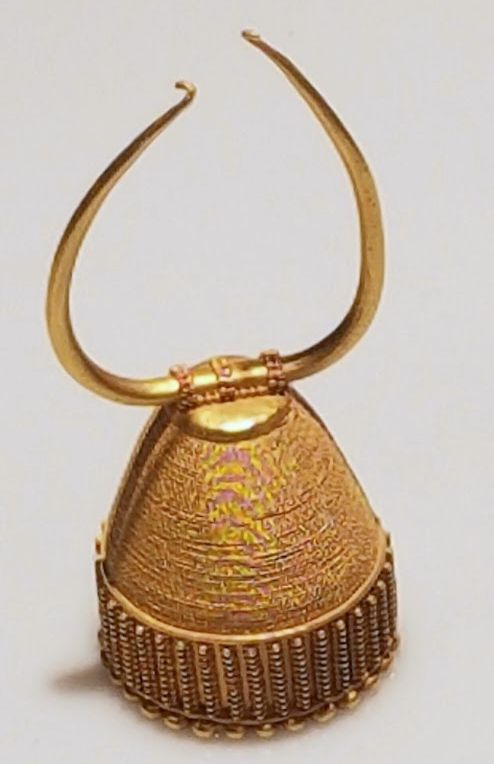
Gold jewellery from the Saruq Al Hadid archaeological site

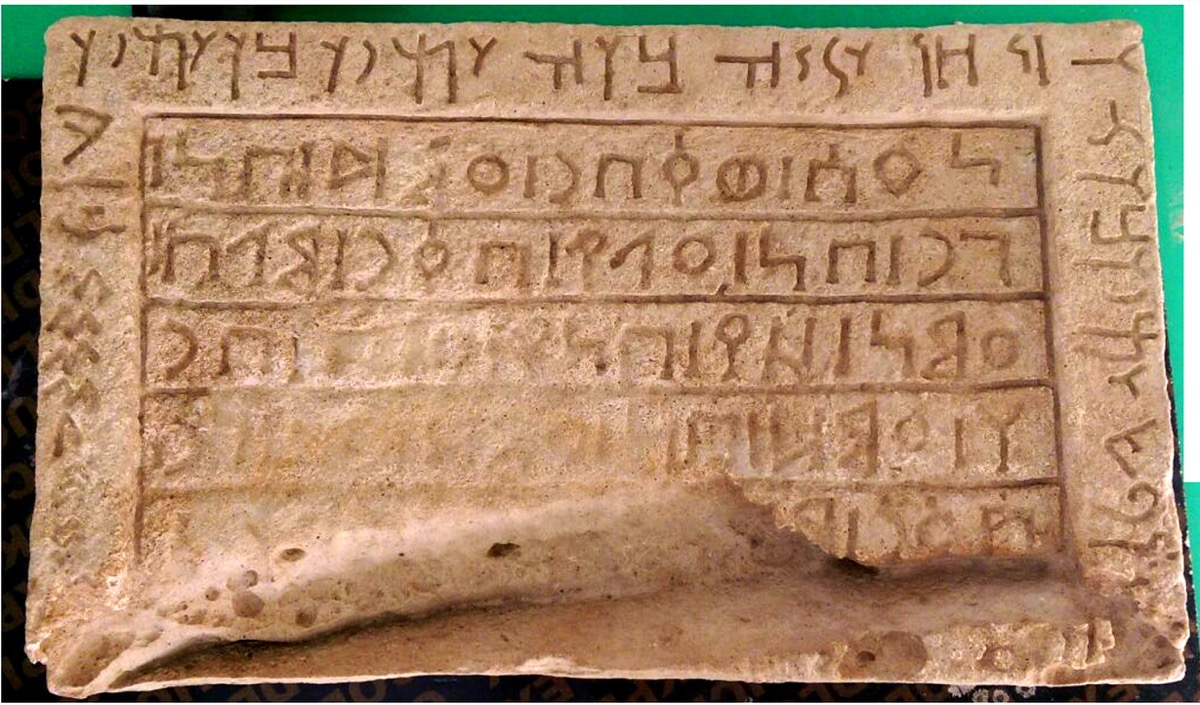
3rd-century BCE bilingual funerary inscription in South Arabian and Aramaic script: "Memorial and tomb of ʿAmud, son of Gurr, son of ʿAli, inspector of the king of Oman, built over him his sonʿAmud son of ʿAmud son of Gurr, inspector of the king of Oman..."

The United Arab Emirates (the UAE or the Emirates) is a country in the eastern part of the Arabian Peninsula, located on the southeastern coast of the Persian Gulf and the northwestern coast of the Gulf of Oman. The UAE has a history of human habitation, transmigration and trade spanning over 125,000 years. Pastoralist, nomadic Paleolithic and Neolithic communities thrived in the area until the 4th millennium BCE. The area was home to the Bronze Age Magan people, known to the Sumerians, who traded with the Harappan culture of the Indus Valley, Afghanistan and Bactria, and the Levant.

Through the three defined Iron Ages and the subsequent Hellenistic period, the area was an important coastal trading entrepôt. It was Islamised in the 7th century, when it again emerged as an important centre for trade, particularly around the ports of Julfar, Dibba and Khor Fakkan. Linked to the Eastern Arab trading network that centred around the Kingdom of Hormuz, these ports formed an important link in the Arab monopoly of trade between the East and Europe.

In the early years of the 16th century, the Portuguese under Afonso de Albuquerque invaded the area and disrupted the Arab Eastern trade networks, triggering a decline in the Arab dominance of the Eastern trade networks and a rise in regional conflict. Conflicts between the maritime communities of the Trucial Coast and the British led to the sacking of Ras Al Khaimah by British forces, which resulted in the first of several British treaties with the coastal rulers in 1820 (leading to the adoption of the name the Trucial States) and their status as a British semi-protectorate.

An early-1968 British decision to withdraw from its involvement in the Trucial States led to the decision to form a federation between two of the most influential Trucial rulers, Sheikh Zayed bin Sultan Al Nahyan of Abu Dhabi and Sheikh Rashid bin Saeed Al Maktoum of Dubai, who shook hands on 18 February 1968 in a desert tent between their emirates. They met with the rulers of the other five Trucial States, together with Bahrain and Qatar, to discuss a federation on 25 February, and in a 27 February joint announcement named the intended federation The Federation of the Arab Emirates.

The United Arab Emirates achieved independence from Britain on 2 December 1971. Six of the seven emirates (Abu Dhabi, Dubai, Sharjah, Ajman, Umm Al Quwain and Fujairah) declared their union that day and the seventh, Ras Al Khaimah, joined the federation on 10 February 1972.

== Prehistory ==
The area known today as the United Arab Emirates has yielded evidence of human habitation dating back 125,000 years and formed one of the routes of human dispersal from Africa to populate the world. Its archaeology attests to periods of Paleolithic, Neolithic, Bronze Age and Iron Age occupation, prior to the Pre-Islamic Recent (PIR) and Islamic era.

=== Dispersal from Africa ===
Early hominid occupation in the UAE is attested by finds of knapped flint tools among extensive assemblages found at Jebel Barakah in Abu Dhabi yielding a date of 200,000 BCE. The earliest evidence for the occupation of the area today known as the UAE by anatomically modern humans, Homo Sapiens, is found at Jebel Faya, where in 2011 archaeologists found a lithic assemblage including hand-axes and several kinds of scrapers and perforators. These objects resemble the tools used by early modern humans in East Africa. According to thermoluminescence dating, the artefacts are 125,000 years old.

The find at Faya represents some of the earliest evidence of modern humanity outside Africa, indicating that humans left Africa much earlier than previously thought. The site, today a UNESCO World Heritage Site, has been preserved with discoveries related to later cultures, including tombs and other finds from the Hafit, Umm Al Nar, Wadi Suq, Iron Age, Hellenistic and Islamic periods on display at Sharjah's Mleiha Archaeological Centre.

=== Neolithic ===
Neolithic occupation in the area of the modern United Arab Emirates is now understood as part of a wider Arabian Gulf coastal world, rather than as a series of isolated sites. Recent excavations have shown that communities were established on the coast and offshore islands by the seventh millennium BCE, including early stone-built structures on Ghagha Island in the western Emirate of Abu Dhabi. These communities relied heavily on maritime resources, including fishing, shellfish gathering and the exploitation of marine mammals, while also using stone tools, shell implements, plaster vessels and pottery.

Long-distance exchange was also a feature of Neolithic life in the region. Ubaid-period pottery recovered from sites in the UAE indicates contact across the Gulf with Mesopotamia, while evidence from Marawah Island includes stone-built settlement remains, funerary spaces and early pearling. Funerary practices are known from both inland and coastal contexts, including the necropolis of Jebel Buhais in Sharjah and Neolithic burial deposits at coastal and island sites.

During the fourth millennium BCE, the Neolithic sequence in eastern Arabia gradually came to an end in association with increasing aridity, falling lake levels and dune reactivation. This environmental deterioration contributed to the so-called Dark Millennium, a period of reduced archaeological visibility across much of the region between approximately 4000 and 3200 BCE. The process was not a complete abandonment of the coast: Akab Island in Umm al-Quwain continued to provide evidence for maritime activity, including a structured dugong bone mound dated to the late fourth millennium BCE.

=== Hafit period ===
The Hafit period followed the Dark Millennium as the re-emergence of human habitation on the western coast of the Emirates. The Hafit period was named after finds of over 300 burials of distinctive beehive-shaped tombs in the mountainous area of Jebel Hafit in the Al Ain Region. The period defines early Bronze Age human settlement in the United Arab Emirates and Oman as from 3,200 to 2,600 BCE. Hafit period tombs and remains have also been found across the UAE and Oman at sites such as Bidaa Bint Saud, Jebel Buhais and Buraimi.

Pottery finds at Hafit period sites demonstrate trading links to Mesopotamia, contiguous to the Jemdat Nasr period (3100 – 2900 BCE). Finds have shown locally manufactured pottery emerged during the transition between the Hafit and Umm Al Nar periods, approximately 2800 to 2700 BCE It is now thought the transition between the two cultural periods is marked by a decline in links between Southeastern Arabia and Mesopotamia, a pattern that would be repeated, albeit more emphatically, in the transitional period between the later Umm Al Nar and Wadi Suq cultures.

== Bronze Age ==
Umm Al Nar (also known as Umm an-Nar) was a Bronze Age culture defined by archaeologists as spanning 2600 to 2000 BCE in the area of the present-day UAE and Oman. The etymology derives from the island of the same name, the first 'find site' of burials from this period, which is adjacent to the city of Abu Dhabi. The key site is well-protected and its location, today between a refinery and a sensitive military area, is restricted from public access.

A characteristic element of the Umm Al Nar culture is circular tombs, typically with well-fitted ashlar stones in the outer wall and multiple human remains within. The Umm Al Nar culture demonstrates evidence of continued trade links with the Sumerian and Akkadian kingdoms and the Indus Valley. The increasing sophistication of the Umm Al Nar people is demonstrated by a richer material culture and evidence of the domestication and husbandry of animals.

Umm Al Nar was followed by a long 200-year transition to the Wadi Suq culture, which dominated the area from 2000 to 1300 BCE. Key archaeological sites, pointing to major trading cities extant during both periods, are located on the western and eastern coasts of the UAE and in Oman and include Dalma, Umm Al Nar, Sufouh, Ed Dur, Tell Abraq and Kalba. Burial sites at Shimal and Seih Al Harf in Ras Al Khaimah have evidence of transitional Umm Al Nar to Wadi Suq burials.

Camels and other animals were domesticated during the Wadi Suq era (2000-1300 BCE), leading to increased inland settlement and the cultivation of diverse crops which included the date palm. Increasingly sophisticated metallurgy, pottery and stone carving led to the development of more effective weaponry and other implements, even as trading links with the Indus Valley and Mesopotamia dwindled and the Wadi Suq people focused increasingly inwards.

== Iron Age ==
Throughout three Iron Ages (Iron Age I, 1200–1000 BCE; Iron Age II, 1000–600 BCE; and Iron Age III, 600–300 BCE) and the Hellenistic Mleiha period (after 300 BCE), Southeastern Arabia was occupied by a number of forces (including the Achaemenid Empire), leading to the construction of a number of fortified settlements.

The development of increasingly complex irrigation ditches and waterways, falaj (plural aflaj) took place during the Iron Age II period and finds at Bidaa bint Saud and Thuqeibah from this period pre-date finds of qanat waterways in Iran. Early finds of aflaj, particularly those around the desert city of Al Ain, have been cited as the earliest evidence of the construction of these waterways. More and more complex systems of irrigation evolved and the Iron Age II era saw the emergence of centralised authority imposed over access to water with finds of bronze figures and distinctive pottery testifing to a widespread snake cult, often linked to evidence of collective worship and cohesive communities.

The UAE has an unusual richness of Iron Age archaeological finds, particularly evidenced by the metallurgical centre of Saruq Al Hadid, in the desert to the south of present-day Dubai, which has yielded a trove of thousands of arrow-heads, gold, carnelian and bone jewellery and ceramics - in all over 12,000 items have been recovered from this site alone. Other important Iron Age settlements in the UAE include Al Thuqeibah, Rumailah, Bidaa bint Saud, Ed Dur, Qusais, Muweilah and Tell Abraq.

The Iron Age buildings found at Rumailah are typical of those in the region, at Iron Age I and II sites such as Al Thuqeibah and Muweilah, with a number of row dwellings, although lacking the perimeter walls found at Thuqeibah. A columned hall at Rumailah provides a further link to Muweilah, while a number of pyramidal seals found there echo with similar objects discovered at Bidaa bint Saud.

Enabled by the domestication of the camel in the region, thought to have taken place around 1000 BCE, Muweilah's trade included the manufacture of copper goods, with "extensive casting spillage from the manufacture of copper items found throughout the site". Muweilah is relatively unique in its early and extensive adoption of iron goods, thought to have been imported from Iran. Hundreds of grinding stones indicate the consumption of both barley and wheat. Artefacts recovered from Muweilah are contiguous to those found from the same period at Tell Abraq and other Iron Age settlements, evidence of an emerging uniform material across the settled areas of the time.

The Iron Age II period also saw the construction of fortifications, with a number of towers and other buildings offering protection to aflaj and the crops they watered. Hili 14 in Al Ain, Madhab Fort and Awhala Fort in Fujairah as well as Jebel Buhais near Madam in Sharjah and Rafaq and Al Nasla in the Wadi Qor in Ras Al Khaimah are all fortifications dating to this time.

== Mleiha ==
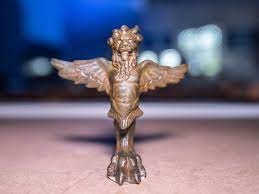
Roman statue of a griffin found in Mleiha

The ancient Near Eastern city of Mleiha, today inland of Sharjah, is linked to the port city of Ed Dur on the west coast of the UAE at Umm Al Quwain. It emerged as an important settlement in the late Iron Age and continued to be a major area of settlement into the pre-Islamic era, and offers the most complete evidence of human settlement and material production in the area at that time. The period from 300 to 0 BCE has been variously called the 'Mleiha period', the 'Late Pre-Islamic period' (PIR) and, according to older references, the 'Hellenistic era': however, Alexander the Great's conquests went no further than Persia, and left Arabia untouched.

Although not conquered by Alexander, Mleiha certainly reflected Greek cultural influence and troves of Hellenistic coins were found at both at Ed Dur and Mleiha featuring a head of Heracles and a seated Zeus on the obverse, and bearing the name of Abi'el in Aramaic. These tetradrachms match coin moulds found at Mleiha, which (with finds of Mleiha slag) suggest the existence of a metallurgical centre and indicate a link between Mleiha and Ed Dur. Camels and horses buried with their heads reversed are also a common feature of animal burials at both Ed Dur and Mleiha.

Funerary inscriptions dating from the mid-3rd century BCE and found at Mleiha mention a kingdom of "Uman": the kingdom is also mentioned by Greek writers Pliny the Elder and Strabo as Omana. The Mleiha site was apparently abandoned after the 3rd century CE, marking the kingdom's fall.

== Early Christian presence ==
Archaeology has revealed late-antique and early Islamic era Christian communities in the present-day UAE, linked to the Church of the East in the Beth Qaṭraye region along the coast. On Sir Bani Yas (Abu Dhabi), a monastery and church were first identified in 1992; subsequent study established the site's monastic character, and a 2025 excavation uncovered a moulded-plaster cross in adjacent courtyard houses (indicating a broader monastic settlement). A second monastery was identified on Siniyah Island in Umm Al Quwain with radiocarbon dates from 534 to 656 CE, representing part of a cluster of Gulf Christian sites contemporary with the emergence of Islam.

The Tuwwam region has long been held to have been related to the Buraimi settlement as a result of mentions in literature by Muqaddasi and others. However, contemporary research has tentatively identified Siniyah Island in Umm Al Quwain as the centre of the ancient lost town and region of Tawwam (or Tu'am); the name Tu'am is derived from St Thomas the Apostle of the East. Siniyah is the site of both a major Christian monastic complex and the oldest pearling town in the Gulf. Siniyah and Sir Bani Yas are two of six monasteries identified on the Persian Gulf coast.

== Islam and the Middle Ages ==
The arrival of envoys from Muhammad in 632 heralded the region's conversion to Islam. At this time, Sasanian influence over the area of Southeastern Arabia was projected by a number of fortified outposts. The Sasanian governor was based on the Batinah coast in present-day Oman, at Damsetjerd. He rejected the message from Medinah, while the local Al Azd tribes under their Julanda leaders accepted it. An uprising against the Sasanians at Damsetjerd followed and they were ejected from the area with the loss of their arms and wealth.

Following the death of Muhammad, many of the tribes of the Gulf turned their backs on the religion of Islam, a wave of apostasy that led the first Caliph, Abu Bakr to launch a series of campaigns to suppress the rebellions. The final battle of what was to become known as the Ridda Wars was fought at Dibba on the east coast of the present day Emirates against a local uprising of apostate forces led by Laqit bin Malik Al Azdi, resulting in the triumph of Islam in the Arabian Peninsula. Although Arab historians record the deaths of 10,000 men in the Battle of Dibba, a figure which has passed into local legend, this was a figure of speech, often used to signify great loss of life, rather than an accurate toll of death.

The Islamic port of Julfar, the precursor settlement to Ras Al Khaimah in the present day Emirates, is prominent in the earliest mentions of Islamic era activity in the region when a force of 3,000 men was sent by the Caliph Abu Bakr from Julfar to invade the Sasanian island of Qays and then proceed to take Fars and move into the Iranian interior.

A period of instability followed that saw the Abbasid caliphs (who took power in 750) attempt to assert their authority over Southeastern Arabia and undertake invasions of Julfar and the surrounding areas. Repelled by the local tribes on a number of occasions, all of Southeastern Arabia from Julfar to Nizwa in present day Oman fell to the 25,000 strong army of Muhammad Bin Nur following the accession of the Caliph Al Murtadid in 892 CE. The widespread destruction of this force brought the entire region down and it was to be some two hundred years before the waning influence of the Caliphate was to see local leaders establish themselves as influences in the region, with the emergence of wealthy trading ports at Hulayla and Julfar in Ras Al Khaimah, Sohar in Oman and the island of Hormuz.

The Islamic era saw the expansion of trading links to the East, with trade centred around Hormuz Island and its port of Julfar. The medieval port was settled in two halves in the present-day Ras Al Khaimah suburbs of Al Mataf and Al Nudud from the 13th to 17th centuries CE. Julfar's founding has been dated to the early to mid-14th century as a small settlement of palm-frond huts which expanded during the 15th and 16th centuries into an important trading town. Julfar's early population fished and probably pearled; they also farmed, benefiting from the access to land and sea which characterised Kush, Julfar's predecessor settlement. Evidence of occupation at Julfar include finds of 14th-century Chinese porcelain, followed by post holes and ovens and the development of mud-brick buildings, defined streets and courtyard houses as the town developed into the 15th century.

Julfar's development as a major trading centre has been linked to the emergence of Hormuz in the 14th and 15th centuries. The 'Hormuzi boom' of the time followed the occupation of the island of Jarun in the Strait of Hormuz by Mahmud Qalhati and his people and its subsequent emergence as a global trading hub linking the extensive Eastern Arab trade networks Hormuz was entirely without sweet water and largely without food production resources and it is likely that Julfar provided pearls, food and water to meet demand on the island, which led to the extensive agricultural development of the areas inland of Julfar. Julfar as a centre for the export of pearls would also be linked to its role as a regional centre of trade between the mainland and Hormuz. A tributary of the Kingdom of Hormuz, which also exercised authority over the areas comprising modern day Bahrain, Qatar and Oman, direct Hormuzi control over Julfar was exercised.

Julfar is mentioned by Portuguese explorer Duarte Barbosa as a major entrepôt, and Barbosa (writing in 1518) also mentions Julfar's successor settlement, Ras Al Khaimah – evidence of a period of contiguity: "Passing above this place Profam [Khor Fakkan], we come to another called Julfar, where dwell persons of worth, great navigators and wholesale dealers. Here is a very great fishery as well of seed-pearls as of large pearls, and the Moors of Ormus come hither to buy them and carry them to India and many other lands. The trade of this place brings in a great revenue to the King of Ormus … Beyond these Profam villages are others along the coast, one of which is a large place called Reçoyma [Ras al-Khaimah]."

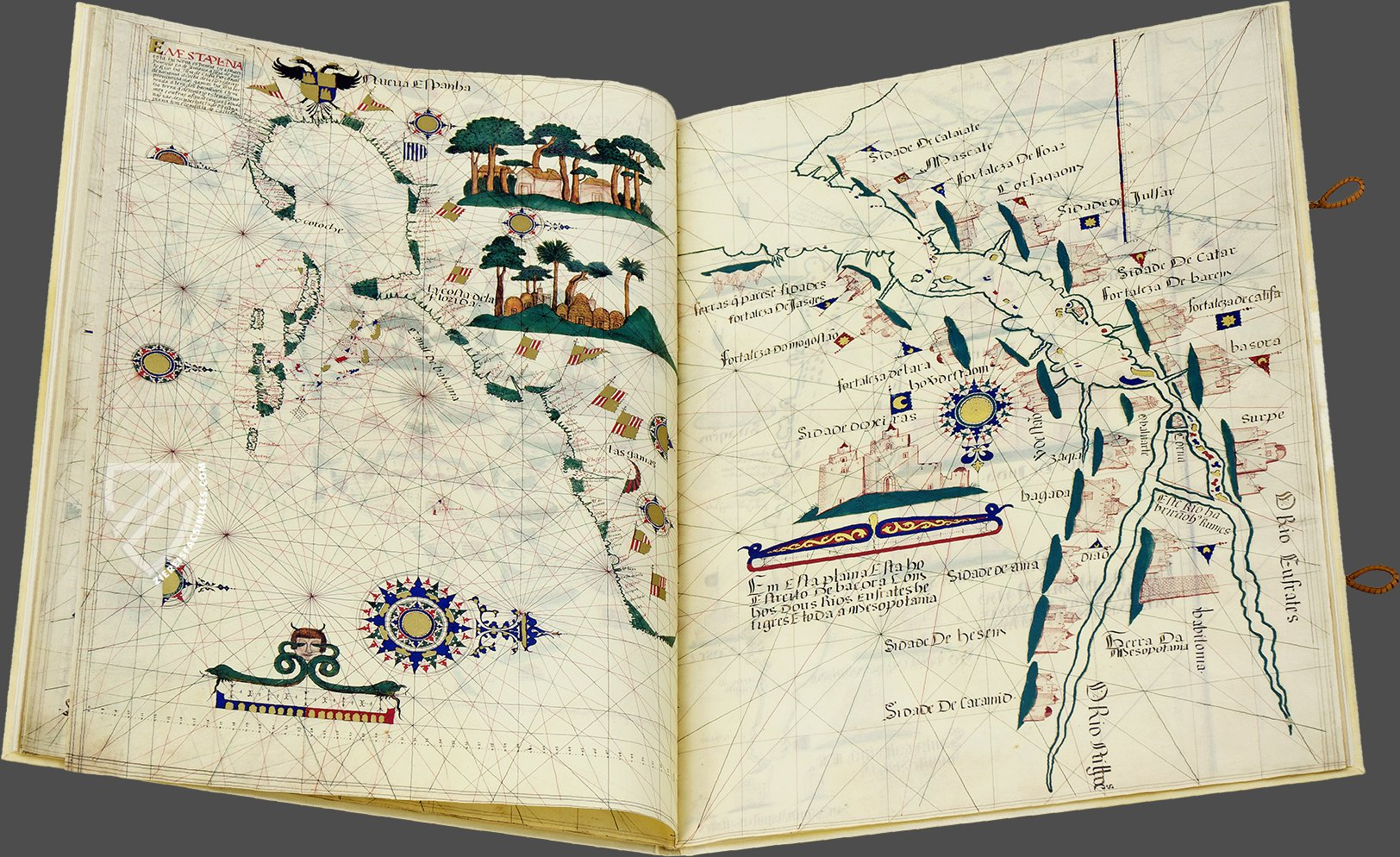
Sidade de Julfar in Lázaro Luís' 1563 map of Arabia

Other travellers mentioning Julfar at this time included the Portuguese explorer Pedro Álvares Cabral and Italian traveller Ludovico di Varthema.

Julfar's prominent role in the region's pearl trade was by now so great that Portuguese conquistador Pedro Texeira postulated the origin of the Portuguese word for pearl, aljofar, originated with the name Al Julfar.

=== Pearling ===
Pearls fished from the Persian Gulf were prized in antiquity: known to the Sumerians as 'fish eyes', they famously adorned Cleopatra and by the 16th century were driving an industry that employed two to three thousands boats in the seasonal fisheries and brought in an income estimated at the time at over half a million Portuguese cruzados. Workers in Julfar and surrounding areas were paid in pearls instead of cash.

After the Portuguese Empire occupied Hormuz island and the northern and Persian coasts and took over the taxation system, the Sultan of Hormuz was responsible for collecting pearling taxes (magumbayas) from 1523 to 1622 and Portugal obtained revenue from the industry until the second decade of the 18th century. The Portuguese system issued navigation permits (cartazes); permit distribution and tax collection were centered in the ports extending from Julfar to Khasab. On the Persian coast, the Portuguese did the same with the Arabs from Bandar Kong to the southwest coast of Iran. Any ship sailing without a Portuguese license was subject to capture by the Portuguese Armada. Fear of armada cannons led to maritime control of the Arabian coast.

== Portuguese empire: 16th–18th centuries ==
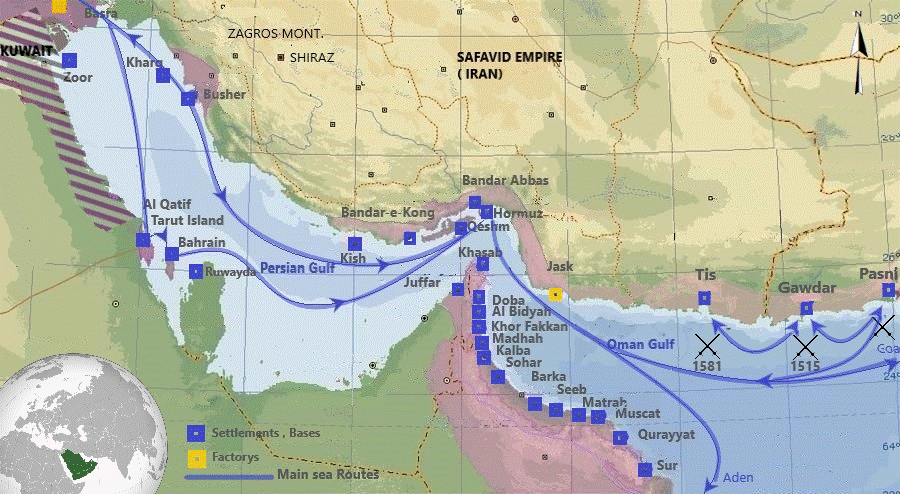
Portuguese colonies in Arabia

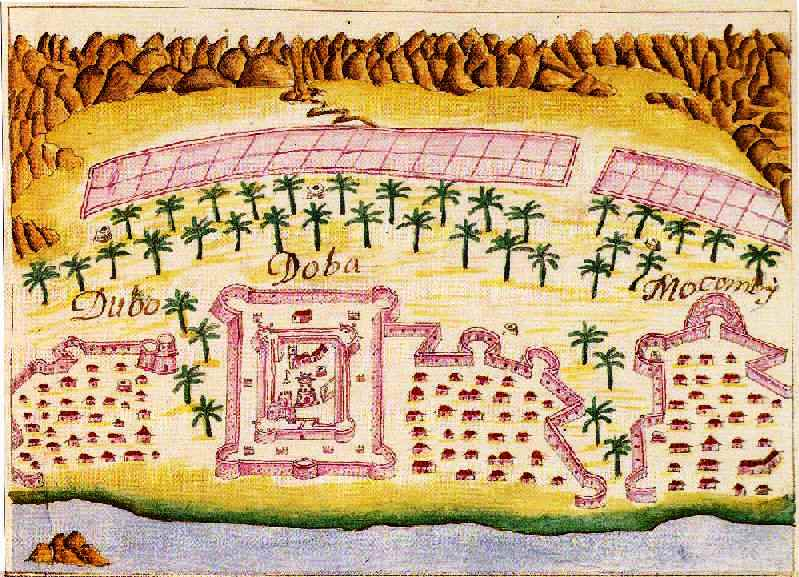
Doba Fort, built by the Portuguese Empire in Dibba Al-Hisn in 1620.

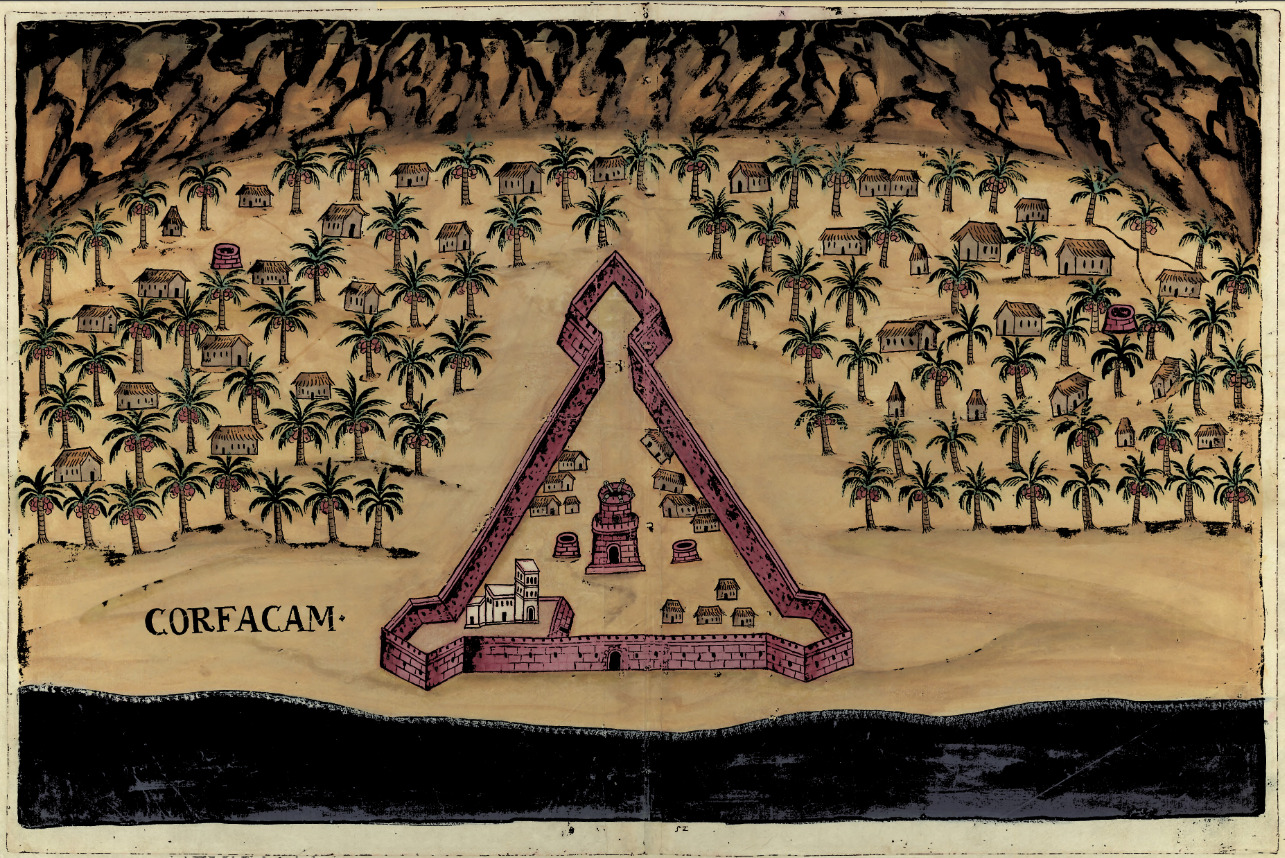
1635 painting of the Portuguese fortress Khor Fakkan (Corfacão)

The Kingdom of Portugal was refounded following the Reconquista, the re-establishment of Christian over Islamic rule in Spain and Portugual, and almost immediately began a series of expansionist moves against Arab ports in North and West Africa. Rounding the Cape of Good Hope, the Portuguese expansion across West Africa was to culminate in Vasco Da Gama's recruitment of a Gujarati pilot in Malindi, in present day Kenya, and the discovery of the route to India.

Da Gama's explorations of India demonstrated to the Portuguese the enormous wealth of the Arab Eastern trade network and Da Gama's successor under King Manuel, Afonso de Albuquerque, embarked on a mission to establish choke points at Socotra and Hormuz in order to throttle the Arab trade and then take over the key trading points on that network, including Aden, Hormuz, Goa and Malacca.

de Albuquerque embarked on his expedition against the Arabs in 1506, establishing a fort at Socotra before proceeding to invade Muscat, then a Hormuzi dependency. Having sacked Muscat and pulled down the minarets of its mosques, he proceeded against the Omani port of Sohar, which capitulated, and then to Khor Fakkan, in the present day Emirates. At the time Khor Fakkan, also a Hormuzi port, was an important port of disembarkation to India. Local resistance was no match for trained Portuguese soldiers with arqubusiers and other advanced weaponry and Khor Fakkan fell. de Albuquerque, as was often the case with the Portuguese in conquest, had the ears and noses of all the men of the town cut off.

de Albuquerque next sailed to Hormuz, where he found a force had been assembled against him of some 60 large vessels and 200 smaller boats and many more shore-boats together with a land force of some 15-20,000 men. Unprepared for the sustained fire from the three Portuguese warships, the Arab fleet was immediately thrown into disarray and completely overwhelmed with great loss of life. On 10 October 1507, the Portuguese conquest of Hormuz was complete and construction was started on the Portuguese fort of 'Our Lady of the Victory', which used the anchor stone of the largest of the Arab ships, the Meri, as the lintel of its front door.

The Portuguese found their new conquests difficult to maintain against the emergence not only of local forces but of new enemies. Despite moving against Julfar in 1621, they found themselves routed from Hormuz in 1623 by a joint force of Persians under Shah Abbas supported by a new force in the region: the English. Muscat was retaken by a rebellion under the Yaaruba in 1650 and, although the Portuguese built and garrisoned forts around Southeastern Arabia, at Julfar, Dibba, Bidya, Khor Fakkan, Kalba and along the Batinah Coast of Oman, these were all to fall to local forces.

Throughout the following century, foreign and local forces ebbed and flowed in the region, as the Portuguese, Dutch, English, French, Persians and Arabs vied for influence and supremacy. The East India companies of the expanding European powers were to become the dominant commercial and military forces not only in the Gulf but across the former Arab trading networks to the East. Portuguese influence in the area waned as British influence grew.

== British empire: 19th and 20th centuries ==
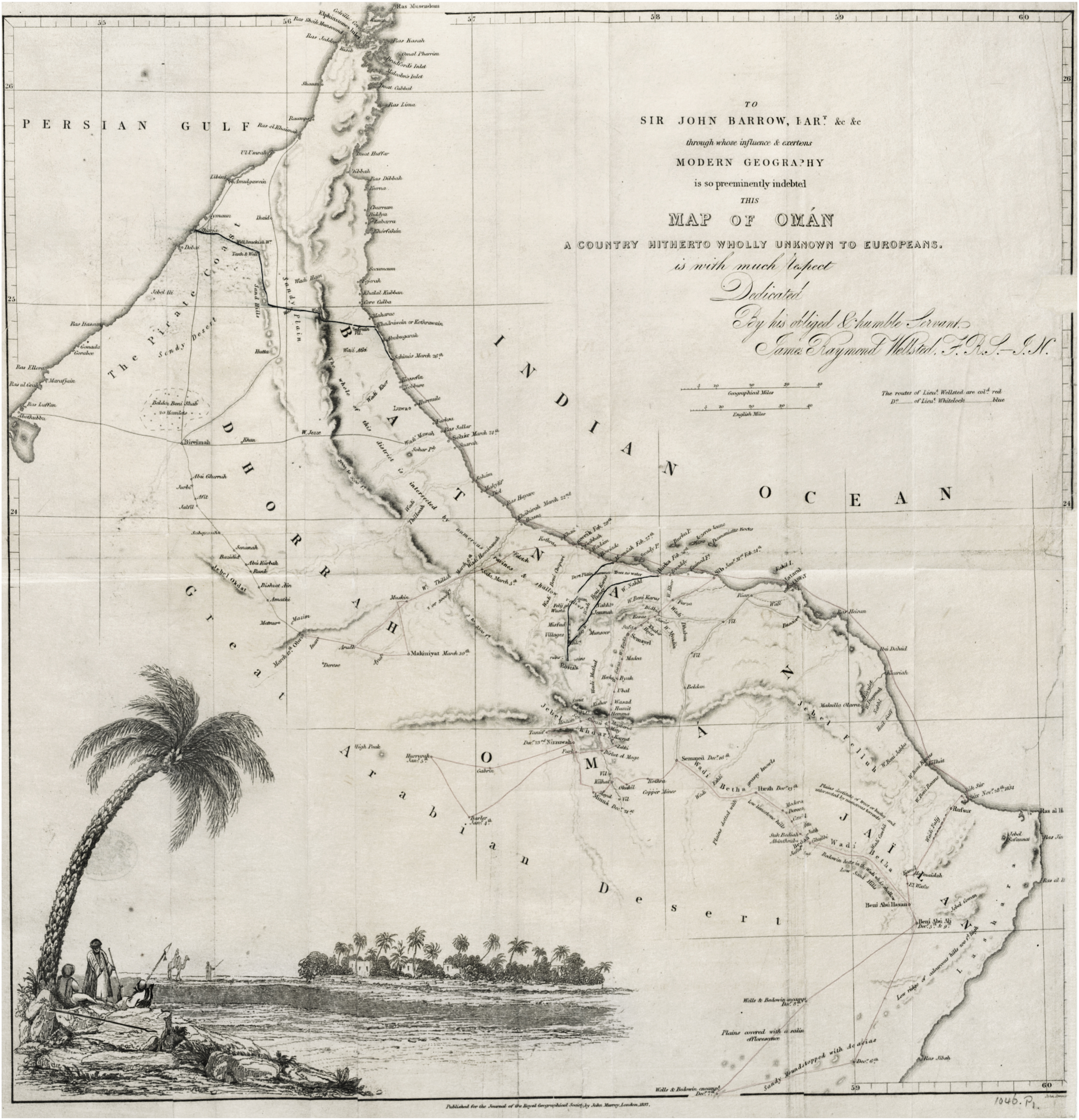
1838 Map of Oman, showing the peninsula that became the United Arab Emirates in 1971

The Huwala, the Arab settlers of the areas formerly under Hormuzi governance on the southern coast of Iran and the islands in the Gulf, were now to re-emerge under the influence of a new force in the region: the Qawasim (singular Al Qasimi). A powerful maritime federation of Arab tribes and trading centres, the Qawasim were inevitably to come into conflict with the encroaching forces of the British East India Company.

From the early 18th century, the Al Qawasim of Ras Al Khaimah and Sharjah emerged as a maritime power under Rahmah bin Mattar Al Qasimi, controlling ports and islands on both sides of the Gulf and building regional trading networks. Later British narratives, particularly those of historian John Gordon Lorimer, portrayed them as pirates, but this interpretation has been challenged, most notably by Sheikh Dr Sultan bin Muhammad Al Qasimi, who argues that accusations of piracy often masked imperial rivalry and strategic ambition.

Early clashes with the British East India Company — beginning in 1727 when the British attacked the rival trading post established by the Qawasim at Qeshm — were rooted in commercial competition rather than piracy. Throughout the mid-to-late 1700s, the Qawasim were deeply entangled in shifting alliances and conflicts involving Persia, Oman and other Gulf powers. Far from acting as indiscriminate pirates, they frequently engaged in conventional warfare, negotiated truces and participated in regional power struggles. By the turn of the 19th century, rising Wahhabi influence, Omani succession struggles and expanding British naval involvement created a volatile environment of ongoing conflict in which the British, allied to the Sultan of Muscat with whom the Qawasim were at war, became embroiled. A series of incidents involving British vessels such as the Bassein, Viper, Shannon and Trimmer occurred largely within the context of the local conflict.

Internal tensions grew within the Qawasim leadership as Wahhabi hardliners gained influence, eventually undermining the Qawasim Ruler Sultan bin Saqr Al Qasimi, who had previously sought accommodation with the British. With Wahhabi-backed forces encouraging aggressive maritime campaigns and British shipping threatened, the East India Company resolved to act decisively. By 1809, amid escalating hostilities and competing alliances, the stage was set for a major British expedition against the Qawasim.

=== Persian Gulf campaign of 1809 ===
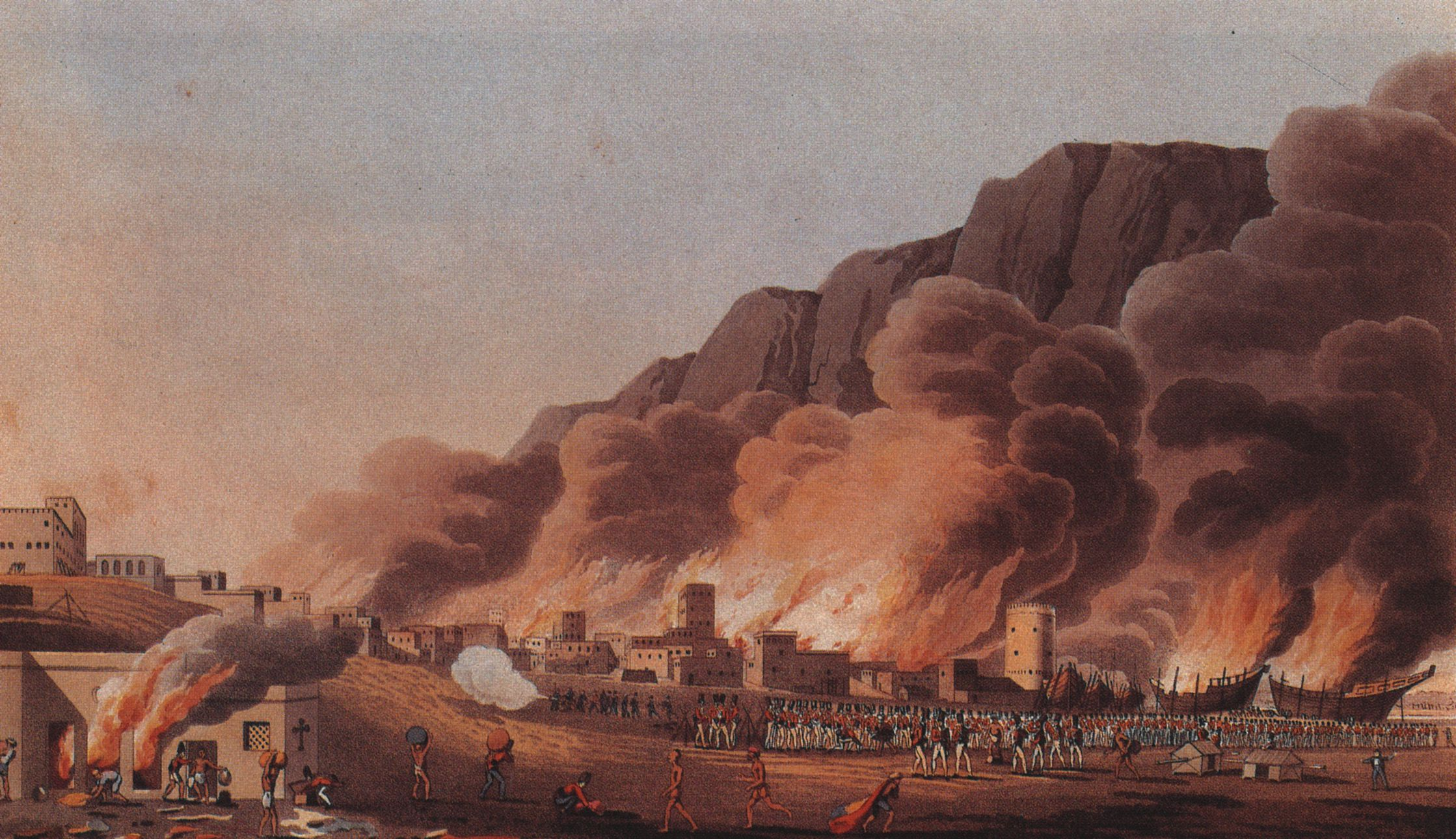
1813 painting of the 1809 sacking of the port of Ras Al Khaimah.

An expeditionary force embarked for Ras Al Khaimah in 1809, beginning the Persian Gulf campaign of 1809 following years of tension between the British and Al Qawasim navies. The campaign ended with a peace treaty between the British and Hassan bin Rahma Al Qasimi, the Al Qasimi leader, which broke down in 1815. British diplomat J. G. Lorimer wrote that after the dissolution of the treaty, the Al Qasimi "indulged in a carnival of maritime lawlessness, to which even their own previous record presented no parallel."

After another year of recurring attacks, Hassan bin Rahmah made conciliatory overtures to Bombay at the end of 1818 which were "sternly rejected". Naval resources commanded by the Al Qasimi were estimated at 60 large boats headquartered in Ras Al Khaimah, carrying 80 to 300 men each, and 40 smaller vessels housed in nearby ports.

=== Persian Gulf campaign of 1819 and General Maritime Treaty of 1820 ===
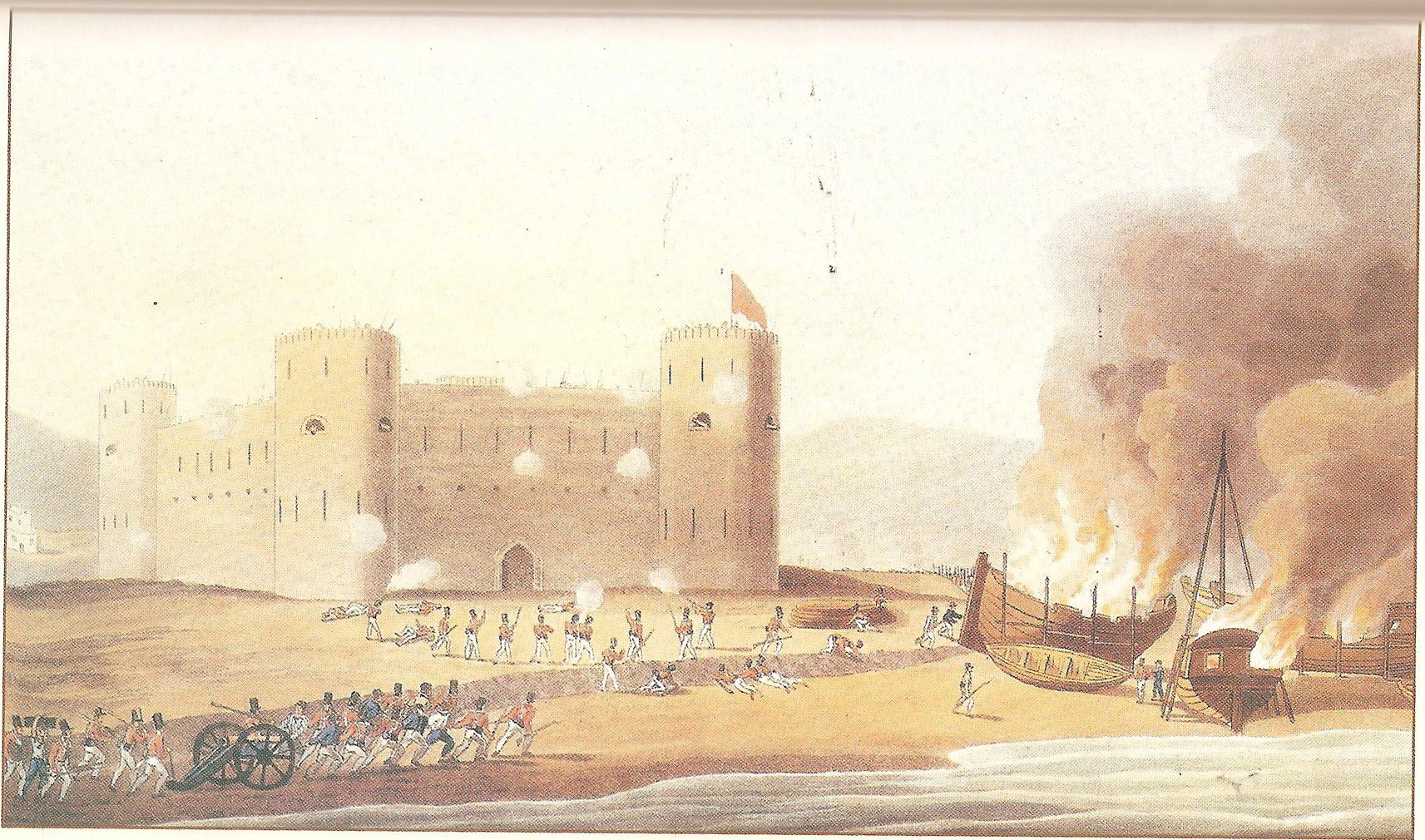
1813 painting of Laft under attack by British forces in December 1809.

The British began an expedition against the Qawasim in November 1819, besieging Ras Al Khaimah with a platoon of 3,000 soldiers led by Major General William Keir Grant and supported by a number of warships which included HMS Liverpool and Curlew. They extended an offer to Said bin Sultan of Muscat to make him ruler of the Pirate Coast if he agreed to assist the British in their expedition, and he obliged with a force of 600 men and two ships.

With the fall of Ras Al Khaimah and the surrender of Dhayah Fort, the British established a garrison of 800 sepoys and artillery in Ras Al Khaimah. Jazirat Al Hamra, south of Rad Al Khaimah, was found to be deserted. The British destroyed the fortifications and larger vessels in Umm Al Quwain, Ajman, Fasht, Sharjah, Abu Hail, and Dubai; ten vessels which had taken shelter in Bahrain were also destroyed. After the expedition, the British and the sheikhs of the coastal communities signed the General Maritime Treaty of 1820.

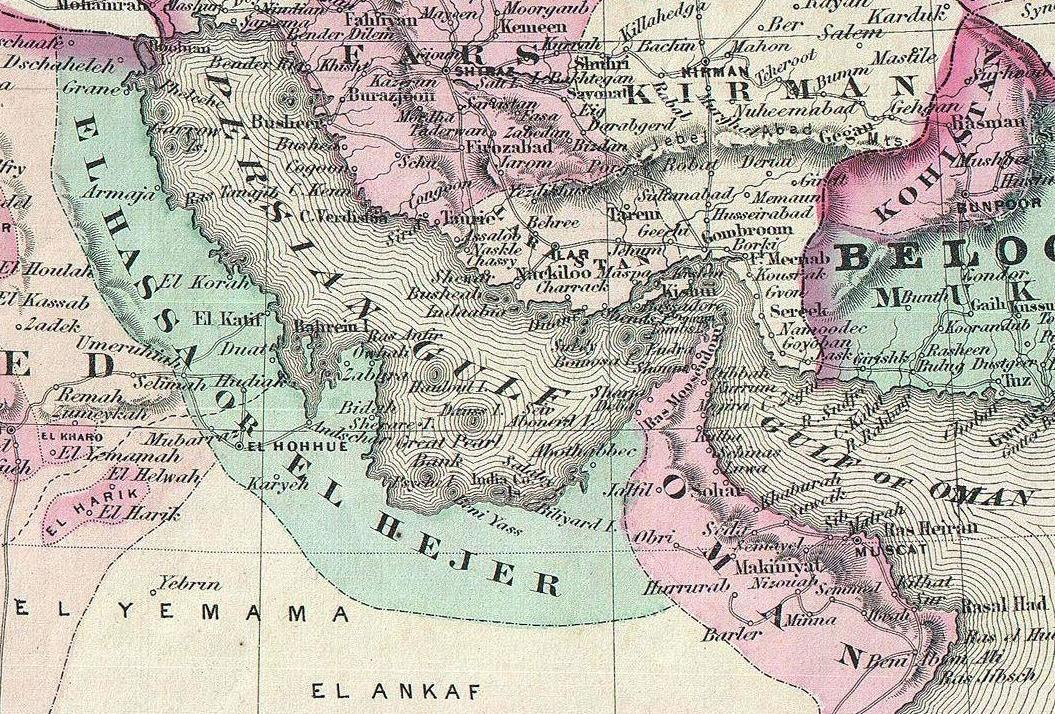
1870 map of the Trucial Coast

Flag of the Trucial States Council

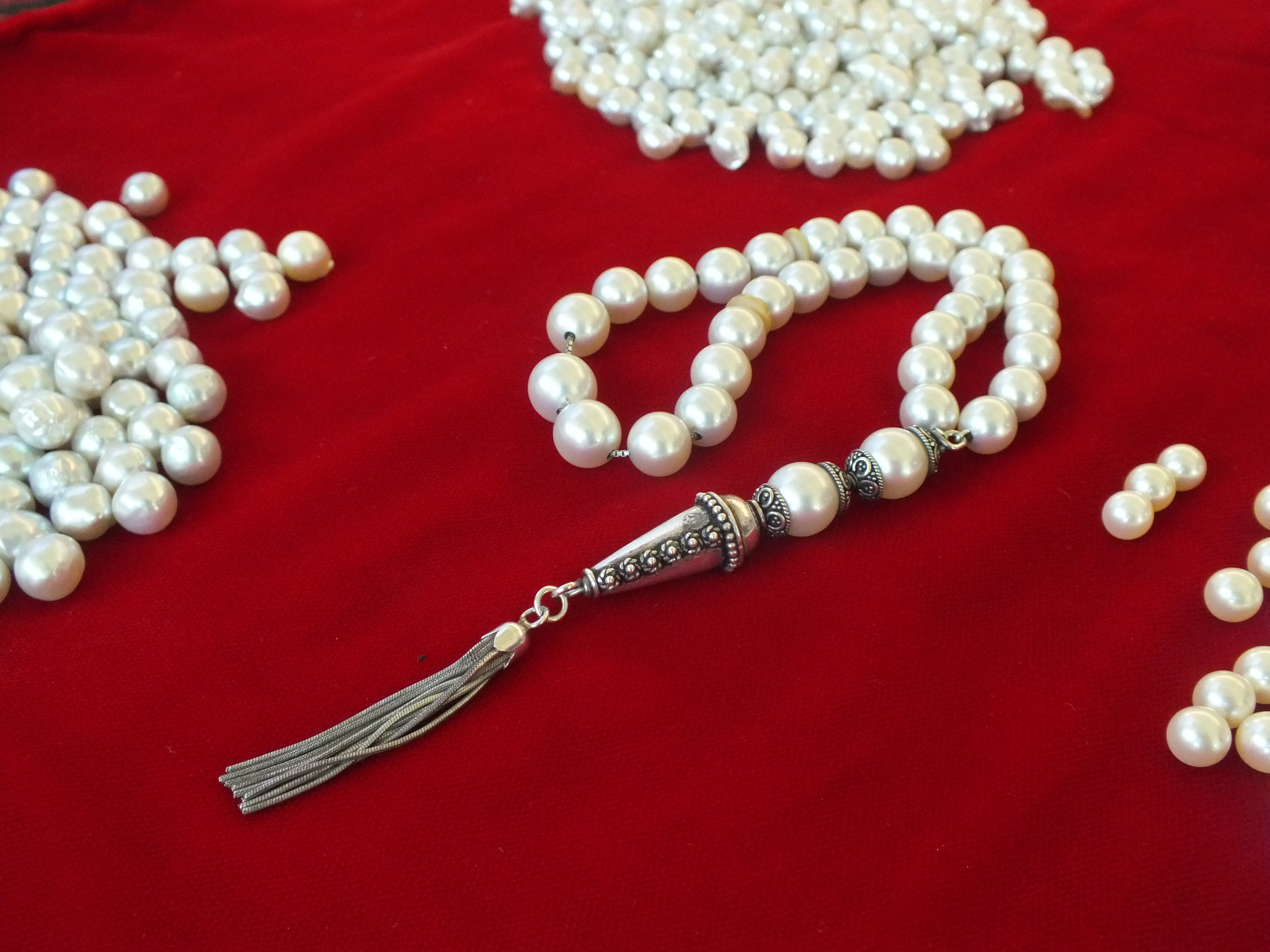
Pearls from Rams. Pearls were central to the economy of the Trucial States.

The 1820 treaty was followed by the 1847 "Engagement to Prohibit Exportation of Slaves From Africa on board of Vessels Belonging to Bahrain and to the Trucial States" and the "Allow Right of Search of April–May 1847". The signatory sheikhs, now expanded by conquering smaller neighbours, included Sheikh Sultan bin Saqr of Ras Al Khaimah, Sheikh Hasher bin Maktoum of Dubai, Sheikh Abdulaziz bin Rashid of Ajman, Sheikh Abdullah bin Rashid of Umm Al Quwain and Sheikh Saeed bin Tahnoun of Abu Dhabi.

The treaty, granting protection to British vessels, did not prevent coastal wars between tribes. Intermittent raids continued until 1835, when the sheikhs agreed not to engage in hostilities at sea for one year in a treaty negotiated by British resident Samuel Hennell; Hennell's truce was renewed annually until 1853.

=== Perpetual Maritime Truce ===
The Perpetual Maritime Truce, signed on 4 May 1853, replaced the annual treaties and prohibited any act of aggression at sea. The signatories included Abdulla bin Rashid of Umm Al Quwain, Hamed bin Rashid of Ajman, Saeed bin Butti of Dubai, Saeed bin Tahnoun ("Chief of the Beniyas") and Sultan bin Saqr ("Chief of the Joasmees"). A further agreement suppressing the slave trade was signed in 1856, followed by the "Additional Article to the Maritime Truce Providing for the Protection of the Telegraph Line and Stations, Dated 1864". An agreement about the treatment of absconding debtors followed in June 1879.

=== Exclusive Agreement ===
Signed in March 1892, the Exclusive Agreement bound the Trucial Rulers not to enter into "any agreement or correspondence with any Power other than the British Government"; without British assent, they would not "consent to the residence within my territory of the agent of any other government" and would not "cede, sell, mortgage or otherwise give for occupation any part of my territory, save to the British Government". In return, the British promised to protect the Trucial Coast from hostile activity on land and sea.

=== Trucial States affairs ===
In accordance with the treaties, the Trucial rulers were independent to manage their internal affairs. They often asked the British to provide naval firepower for their frequent disputes, particularly when the disputes involved indebtedness to British and Indian nationals.

During the late 19th and early 20th centuries, a number of changes occurred to the status of emirates. Emirates such as Rams and Dayah (now part of Ras Al Khaimah) were signatories to the original 1819 treaty, but were not recognised by the British as trucial states; the emirate of Fujairah, today one of the seven United Arab Emirates, was not recognised as a trucial state until 1952. Kalba, recognised as a trucial state by the British in 1936, is part of the present-day emirate of Sharjah.

Until the 1930s, the British refrained from interfering in the internal affairs of the Trucial sheikhdoms as long as peace was maintained. This contrasted with their policy in Oman, where the British supported the stability of Oman's sultanate and maintained their airbase on Masirah Island. According to a British official,

They could fight each other as much as they liked by land, and we did not hesitate to recognize a ruler who had acquired power by murder. The construction of an airport at Sharjah and the grant of oil concessions to an oil company forced us to modify this policy to some extent.

== The decline of pearling ==
Pearling was a key economic activity throughout the C18-C19th and central to the area's coastal economy until its decline in the early C20th. It was key to the influence enjoyed by the Trucial Rulers: some 80 percent of Sheikh Zayed bin Khalifa Al Nahyan's revenue was derived from the pearling fleet, giving him great influence among the tribes and allowing him to distribute largesse.

At the start of the pearling season, which lasted from June to September, thousands of ships gathered with provisions for three months and a starting day would be set. On that day, celebrations were held and religious rites observed; this included the traditional charming of sharks so they would not harm the divers. The ships then dispersed on a clear, windless day, when the sea was calm.

Each ship carried divers, who dove to the sea floor to gather pearls. To reach the bottom, two heavy stones were tied to the diver's feet and a cord to his waist; the cord was held by haulers who would pull the divers up.

At the height of the pearling industry, in the early 1900s, about 4,500 pearl boats operated from Gulf ports, employing over 74,000 people in 1907.

The initial explanation of the decline of the Gulf pearling industry and the economy of the Trucial Coast, derived from two entries in the 1929 and 1930 British Residency Monthly Report by Hugh Biscoe (a newly-arrived administrator with experience in India and none in the Gulf), cited two factors: the invention of the cultured pearl by Japanese entrepreneur Kokichi Mikimoto and the Great Depression of 1929. Contemporary research indicates that overfishing, regional and world wars, poor weather and mounting debt sent the industry into decline about 20 years before Biscoe's memo, with reports of consistently poor harvests and depressed markets since 1911. The industry was already beyond recovery by the time of Biscoe's reports; the Great Depression and cultured pearls played no role in its decline. The Japanese cultured pearl, initially regarded as a wonder and displayed at expositions, began to be produced in commercial quantities during the late 1920s. However, the damage had already been done: in 1907, 335 pearling boats operated out of Dubai; in 1929, only 60 boats remained in port during the season.

The complex system of finance that underpinned the pearling industry and the relationships among owners, pearl merchants, nakhudas (captains), divers and pullers fell apart, leaving a large number of men unemployed. The pearling industry used slave labour; a record number of slaves approached the British Agent seeking manumission during the 1930s, reflecting the parlous state of the pearling fleet and its owners.

== Discovery of oil ==
During the 1930s, the first oil company teams carried out preliminary surveys. An onshore concession was granted to Petroleum Development (Trucial Coast) in 1939, and an offshore concession to D'Arcy Exploration Ltd in 1952. Exploration concessions were limited to British companies in accordance with agreements between the trucial sheikhs and British government. Management of the Trucial Coast moved from the British government in Bombay to the Foreign Office in London in 1947 with Indian independence. The Political Resident in the Gulf headed the small team responsible for liaison with the trucial sheikhs; he was based in Bushire until 1946, when his office was moved to Bahrain. Day-to-day administration was carried out by the Native Agent, a post established with the 1820 treaty and abolished in 1949. This agent was bolstered by a British political officer, based in Sharjah, in 1937.

Oil was discovered under Umm Shaif (an old pearling bed in the Persian Gulf) in 1958, and in the desert at Murban in 1960. The first cargo of crude was exported from Jabel Dhanna in the Emirate of Abu Dhabi in 1962. As the emirate's oil revenue increased, Sheikh Zayed bin Sultan Al Nahyan built schools, housing, hospitals and roads. When Dubai began exporting oil in 1969, Sheikh Rashid bin Saeed Al Maktoum also used oil revenue to improve his people's quality of life.

=== World War II and aftermath ===
British administrators in the Trucial States were particularly sensitive to criticism during the early part of the war, particularly into 1940 when things were going badly in Europe; an Indian trading company's agent was deported to India for expressing pro-German sentiment that year. The ruler of Sharjah turned up the volume of his radio and played German Arabic-language broadcasts for the benefit of an increasingly-large crowd gathering nightly to hear the broadcasts, a practice which was stopped by the horrified British Residency Agent. Rumours in the souk about British and French failure were found to have been started by Abdullah bin Faris, the ruler's secretary, and a war of words followed between Faris' supporters and British authorities; Faris was "kept under observation". British military activity increased at the aerodrome and RAF station at Sharjah, at the RAF landing strip and refuelling depot on Sir Bani Yas Island in Abu Dhabi, and at smaller facilities in Kalba and Ras Al Khaimah.

A Handley Page HP42 biplane airline en route from India to Sharjah in the Gulf of Oman was lost in March 1940, and a Wellington bomber was lost in February 1943 at Dhadna in Fujairah. A monument to the crash and the death of the Wellington's navigator stands at Dhadna, on the east coast. Three Blenheim light bombers crashed in 1942 and 1943; one was due to engine failure in Umm Al Quwain, and one ditched in shallow water off Sharjah. One was fatal, with the loss of the pilot and two crew members of a Blenheim that lost an engine as it took off from Sharjah over the desert on 1 February 1942.

The war at sea included the August 1944 sinking off the coast of Oman by the German U-boat U859 of the American Liberty Ship John Barry, which was carrying silver ingots destined for Russia. The first sinking of a submarine in the area was the 1940 attack on the Italian submarine Luigi Galvani, with the loss of 26 of its crew, after papers relating to its voyage were taken from the surrender of another Italian submarine. Thirty-one crew members were picked up by British ships. The German U-Boat U533 was sunk off the coast of Fujairah by a Blenheim flying out of Sharjah. A single survivor from the U-boat was interned in Sharjah for the duration of the war.

During the war, rationing and identity cards were introduced; commodities such as tea and sugar became valuable rarities. Opportunistic traders in Dubai smuggled and traded contraband and engaged in gunrunning. Outbreaks of disease were frequent, including outbreaks of cholera. Swarms of locusts – considered edible by the locals – were frequent, although a British eradication program (involving celebrated explorer Wilfred Thesiger) was successful.

An internal conflict broke out in the Trucial States when Sheikh Rashid bin Saeed Al Maktoum led a party of men to build a pair of watchtowers overlooking the entrance to the creek in the coastal area of Khor Ghanadah, south of Dubai, on 17 October 1945. A combination of launches and landward forces was used, with about 300 men descending on the area and planting Dubai flags. Seeing the potential of a conflict with Abu Dhabi (which also claimed Ghanadah), the British noted Rashid's breach of the 1853 Perpetual Maritime Treaty and he withdrew.

Sheikh Shakhbut of Abu Dhabi was furious at the incursion, and camel-raiding by Bedouin tribes loyal to Abu Dhabi started to take place. Sheikh Rashid began to retaliate and launched a raid against Abu Dhabi in January 1946, capturing a large number of camels. Measures were taken by the British to force Rashid to stand down, including stopping British India Steam Navigation Company steamers from calling into Dubai on 8 June 1946. The British ruled that Ghanadah belonged to Abu Dhabi, and Dubai agreed to restitution and the return of a number of Abu Dhabi's camels on 15 July 1946.

The signing of a treaty in March 1947 was followed by further raiding by parties from the Manasir, Al Bu Shamis and Awamir tribes after Shakhbut failed to pay his Bedouins. Raiders had taken over fifty camels from Dubai by July 1947, and in August and September 300 more camels were taken by raiders and two Dubai men were killed. Abu Dhabi was blockaded by the British, resulting in peace in April 1948. The British drew the line between the two emirates at Hassyan on the coast and Al Ashoosh inland (where it remains), although the border was not finally agreed until 1968.

The mountainous area of Masfout was seized from the town's Na'im headman, Saqr bin Sultan Al Hamouda, by Ajman ruler Rashid bin Humaid Al Nuaimi in 1948. After a long and debilitating conflict with its neighbour, Hatta, Masfout could not raise a force to oppose Rashid. Part of Masfout, the village of Sayh Mudayrah and the nearby community of Sinadil, were subject to a border dispute with Oman which was settled with joint sovereignty until a final border settlement in 1998 placed Sinadil on the Omani side of the border.

=== Buraimi dispute ===
A group of about 80 Saudi Arabian guards – 40 of whom were armed – led by the Saudi Emir of Ras Tanura, Turki Abdullah al Otaishan, crossed Abu Dhabi in 1952, occupied Hamasa (one of three Omani villages in the oasis), and claimed it as part of the Eastern Province of Saudi Arabia. The sulṭan of Muscat and imam of Oman gathered their forces to expel the Saudis, but were persuaded by the British government to exercise restraint and attempts to settle the dispute by arbitration. The British military presence increased, leading to the implementation of a standstill agreement and referral of the dispute to an international arbitration tribunal. Arbitration began in Geneva in 1955, but collapsed when British arbitrator Reader Bullard objected to Saudi Arabian attempts to influence the tribunal and withdrew. A few weeks later, the Saudi party was driven from Hamasa by the Trucial Oman Levies. The dispute was finally settled in 1974 by the Treaty of Jeddah between UAE President Sheikh Zayed and King Faisal of Saudi Arabia.

=== Trucial States Council ===
The British instituted the Trucial States Council in 1952 and allocated a Trucial States Development Budget, a limited fund which did little to bolster the resources of the Trucial States' rulers. Abu Dhabi did not strike oil until 1956, and revenue from oil-exploration concessions formed much of the rulers' income. When the Arab League approached them with an offer of a significant development fund, it found a receptive audience.

An Arab League delegation headed by Egyptian diplomat and Arab League Secretary-General Abdel Khaleq Hassouna visited the Trucial States on an October 1964 "mission of brotherhood", proposing the creation of a £5 million development fund for the states. Ras Al Khaimah ruler Saqr bin Mohammed Al Qasimi and Saqr bin Sultan Al Qasimi of Sharjah, an ardent Arab nationalist, supported the opening of an Arab League office in Sharjah.

A wave of demonstrations broke out in the streets of the Trucial States, with increasing anti-British sentiment. Long maintaining "British prestige" on the Trucial Coast, British administrators were alarmed at the strength of the sentiment and its source: Nasserism and its Soviet backers. British officials petitioned the rulers to turn down the Arab League offer, citing previous treaties in which the trucial rulers pledged not to deal with any foreign government other than the British. Saqr bin Sultan Al Qasimi was obstinate, even when British officials threatened to close his airspace and shut down Sharjah's power station. The British increased funding to the Trucial States Development Fund until it stood at £2.5 million, but the rulers of the Northern States were not impressed; the ruler of Ajman, Rashid bin Humaid Al Nuaimi, said that "5 million pounds will go further than 2.5 million pounds".

Terence Clark, deputy to the ill British Political Agent in Dubai Glencairn Balfour Paul, deposed Saqr bin Sultan Al Qasimi in a 1965 bloodless palace coup. The Trucial Oman Scouts overran Sharjah Fort and removed Saqr's brother, Abdullah bin Sultan Al Qasimi. Abdullah was accompanied by the son of Ras Al Khaimah ruler Khalid bin Saqr bin Muhammad Al Qasimi.

Saqr was exiled to Bahrain and, eventually, to Cairo. His cousin, Khalid bin Mohammed Al Qasimi succeeded him as ruler of Sharjah on 25 June 1965.

== Independence and union: 1966–1971 ==
By 1966, the British government had concluded that it could no longer afford to govern the Trucial States. Deliberation took place in Parliament, with a number of MPs arguing that the Royal Navy would not be able to defend the trucial sheikhdoms. UK Secretary of State for Defence Denis Healey reported that the British Armed Forces were severely overextended and, in some respects, dangerously under-equipped to defend the sheikhdoms.

On 16 January 1968, British Prime Minister Harold Wilson announced the decision to end the treaty relationships with the seven trucial sheikhdoms which had been (with Bahrain and Qatar), under British protection. The British decision to withdraw was reaffirmed in March 1971 by Prime Minister Edward Heath.

The region faced a host of serious local and regional problems. There were Iranian claims for Bahrain and other islands in the Gulf, territorial disputes between Qatar and Bahrain over Zubarah and the Hawar Islands, and the Buraimi dispute was still unresolved by Saudi Arabia, Abu Dhabi and Oman. Views differ about the Shah of Iran's intentions; Abdullah Omran Taryam says that Iran was contemplating the occupation of Bahrain and other islands in the Gulf, and Alvandi Roham writes that the Shah had no intention of using force to resolve the Bahrain question and unsuccessfully sought a "package deal" with Great Britain for the Tunb Islands and Abu Musa. The rulers of the emirates believed that Britain's continued presence guaranteed the region's safety, and some did not want Britain to withdraw; days after the British announcement to withdraw, Sheikh Zayed tried to persuade them to honour the protection treaties by offering to pay the costs of keeping British armed forces in the Emirates. The British Labour government rebuffed the offer. Dennis Healey said on the BBC TV programme Panorama that he disliked the idea of being "a sort of white slaver for Arab sheikhs", a remark for which he later apologised.

=== Federation of nine emirates ===
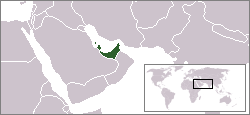
The proposed Federation of Arab Emirates, which included present-day Bahrain, Qatar, and the United Arab Emirates

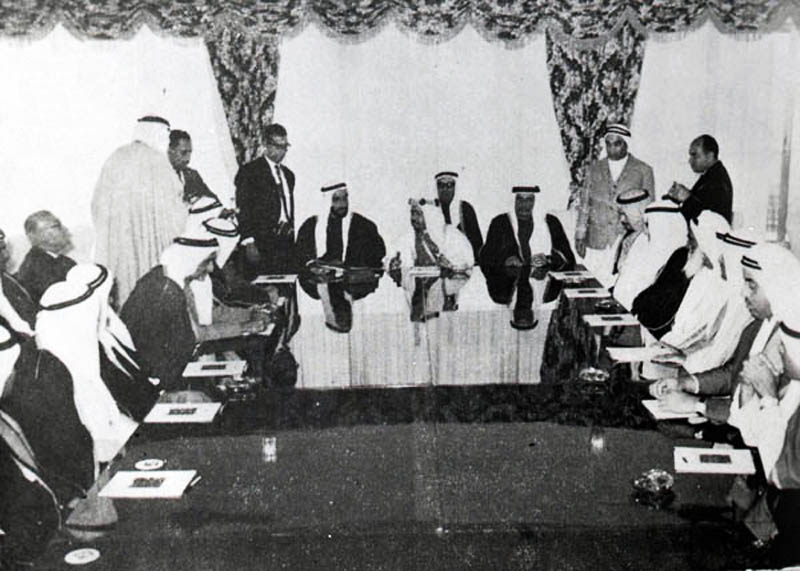
First conference on the Gulf federation in Abu Dhabi, 1968.

Between 8 and 11 January 1968, Labour MP Goronwy Roberts informed the trucial rulers about the British withdrawal. On 18 February, Sheikh Zayed of Abu Dhabi and Sheikh Rashid of Dubai met at Argoub Al Sedirah (a hill in the desert between their emirates) and agreed on the principle of union. They announced their intention to form a coalition, extending an invitation to other Gulf states to join. Later that month, at a summit meeting attended by the rulers of Bahrain, Qatar and the Trucial States, the government of Qatar proposed the formation of a federation of Arab emirates to be governed by a council of nine rulers. The proposal was accepted, and a declaration of union was approved. There was some disagreement among the rulers on matters such as the location of the capital, the drafting of a constitution and the distribution of ministries.

Further political issues surfaced when Bahrain attempted to claim a leading role in the nine-state union, and differences emerged among the rulers of the Trucial Coast, Bahrain and Qatar; the latter two were engaged in a long-running dispute over the Hawar Islands. While Dubai's ruler, Sheikh Rashid, had a strong connection to the Qatari ruling family – including the royal intermarriage of his daughter with the son of the Qatari emir – the relationship between Abu Dhabi and Dubai (also cemented by intermarriage; Rashid's wife was a member of Abu Dhabi's ruling family) endured the break-up of talks with Bahrain and Qatar. The sixth meeting, which took place in Abu Dhabi in October 1969, saw Zayed bin Sultan Al Nahyan elected as the federation's first president. There were stalemates on numerous issues during the meeting, including the position of vice-president, defense of the federation, and whether a constitution was required. A message was read to the Supreme Council from the British Political Resident which triggered a walk-out by delegates who found it patronising, prompting Qatar to withdraw from the federation over what it perceived as foreign interference in its internal affairs. This was the last meeting of the nine-member Supreme Council, and the nine-emirate federation was disbanded despite efforts by Saudi Arabia, Kuwait and Britain to reinvigorate discussions. Bahrain became independent in August 1971, and Qatar the following month.

=== Declaration of union: 1971–1972 ===
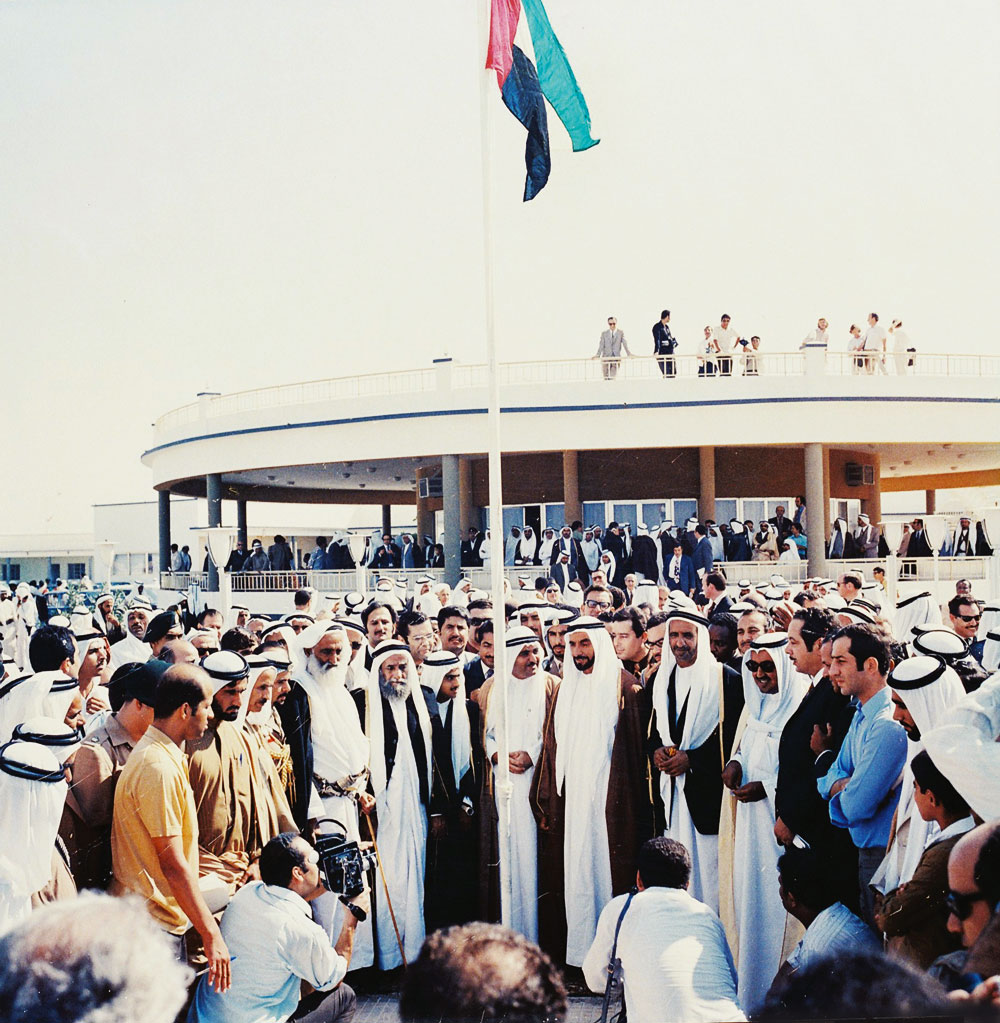
The first hoisting of the United Arab Emirates flag by the rulers of the emirates at the Union House in Dubai on 2 December 1971.

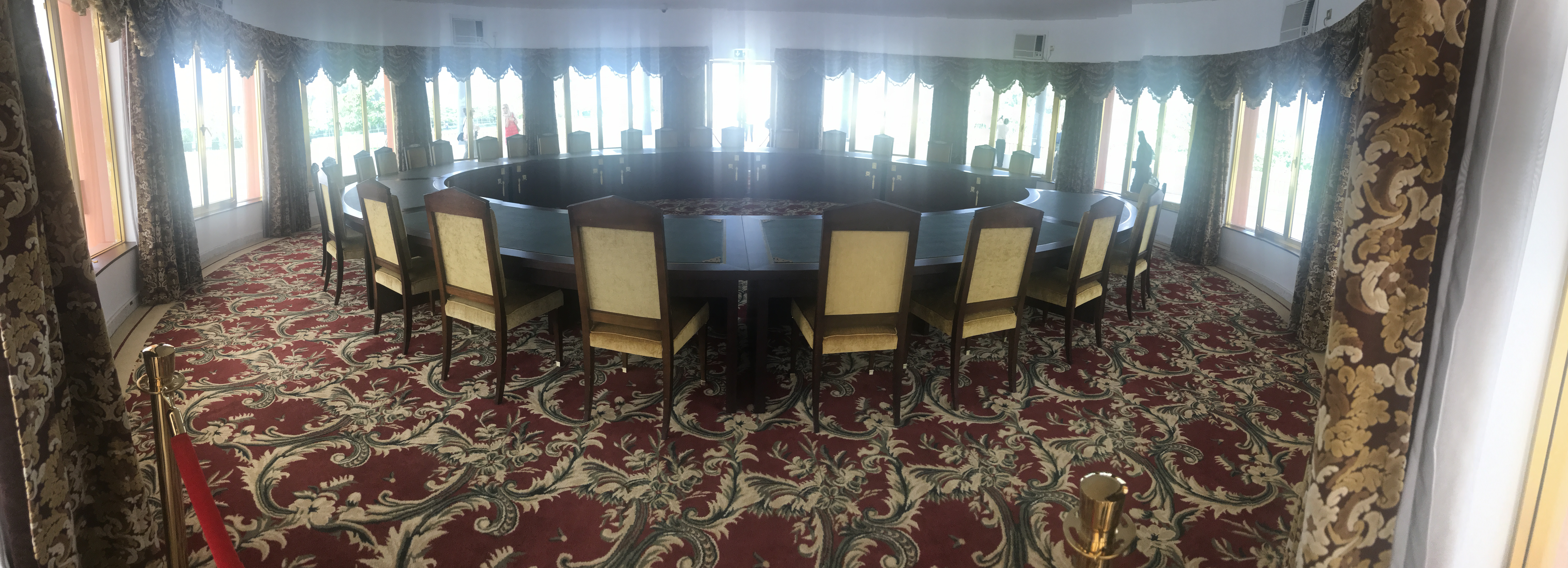
Meeting room where the first constitution was signed on 2 December 1971 in Dubai, now part of the Etihad Museum.

On 29 and 30 November 1971, a contingent of the Iranian army supported by naval forces occupied the islands of Abu Musa and the Lesser and Greater Tunbs. On Greater Tunb, six policemen clashed with approximately 2,000 Iranian troops; in the ensuing skirmish, four Ras Al Khaimah policemen and three Iranian soldiers were killed. The Iranian troops demolished the police station, the school, and a number of houses, forcing the natives to leave the island. The dead were buried on the island, and the residents were put on fishing boats and taken to Ras Al Khaimah. The Imperial Iranian Navy seized the islands with little resistance from the small local Arab police force. The population of Greater Tunb in 1971 was 150. The first soldier killed on the island was Salem Suhail bin Khamis, who was shot after he refused to lower the Ras Al Khaimah flag. The death of 20-year-old bin Khamis, the first martyr in the United Arab Emirates, is observed on November 30 as Commemoration Day. The ruler of Sharjah was forced to agree to negotiate for Iranian troops to occupy Abu Musa. His options were to save part of the territory or permanently forego the restoration of the remaining part of the island.

The British-Trucial States treaty was annulled on 1 December 1971, and the Trucial States became the United Arab Emirates the following day. Six former Trucial States signed the UAE's founding treaty, with a constitution quickly drafted to meet the 2 December deadline. On that date, at the Dubai Guesthouse (now known as Union House), the rulers of the six emirates agreed to form a union. Although the ruler of Ras Al Khaimah was present, he was not a signatory; Ras Al Khaimah joined the UAE on 10 February 1972. The new state was recognised first by Jordan, on 2 December 1971. The UAE joined the Arab League on 6 December, and the United Nations three days later.

== Establishment: 1972-2000 ==
The United Arab Emirates' provisional constitution established five federal bodies: the Supreme Council of Rulers; the office of the President; the Cabinet; the Federal National Council (FNC) and the federal judiciary. The constitution also allowed the ruler of each emirate to maintain sovereignty "over their own territories and territorial waters that are not within the jurisdiction of the Union". A provision of the 1971 constitution was the establishment of a new capital city for the federation to be built between Dubai and Abu Dhabi and to be called Karama (Dignity). This provision was never enacted.

A program of nation-building followed; the new nation had no ministries or other formal government bodies, no national infrastructure (roads, telecom, education, and finance) or national currency. The first annual federal budget, promulgated in February 1972, envisaged spending six million BD on social housing, electricity and communication infrastructure (including roads).

=== Coups in Sharjah ===
The former ruler of Sharjah, Sheikh Saqr bin Sultan Al Qasimi, and an armed group supported by Ras Al Khaimah forced his way into the palace of Sharjah ruler Sheikh Khalid bin Mohammed Al Qasimi on 24 January 1972, occupied it, and demanded to be recognized as the ruler of Sharjah. The group took control of the ruler's palace around 2:30 pm, with reports of gunfire and grenade explosions in the palace. Besieged by the Union Defence Force (which arrived an hour later), Saqr surrendered early on 25 January to UAE Minister of Defence Sheikh Mohammed bin Rashid Al Maktoum. Khalid was killed in the fighting.

Saqr was handed over to Sheikh Zayed by Mohammed and, according to Glencairn Balfour-Paul, "dropped in an underground hole in Buraimi". According to other sources, he was tried and imprisoned until 1979 before returning to exile in Cairo.

On 25 January 1972, the ruling family in Sharjah met to choose a new ruler for the emirate; Sheikh Sultan bin Muhammad Al-Qasimi, brother of the late ruler, was unanimously chosen to succeed him. The Supreme Council met in emergency session to consider the situation and, in addition to issuing an obituary of Sheikh Khālid, proclaimed the accession. The movement to form a union took place at a time of unprecedented instability in the region, with a border dispute resulting in 22 deaths in Kalba and the January 1972 Sharjah coup; the emir of Qatar was deposed by his cousin in February 1972.

On 17 June 1987, while Sultan Bin Muhammad Al Qasimi was on holiday in the UK, his elder brother Abdulaziz led a coup. Abdulaziz, faced with unanimous support for Sultan Bin Muhammad by the UAE's rulers, agreed to a reconciliation and assumed the position of crown prince while Sultan was restored as ruler.

=== Tanker war ===
The newly-integrated UAE Armed Forces first saw action in 1982 with the establishment of the UN-brokered Multi-National Force in Lebanon, a peacekeeping role. UAE forces held similar peacekeeping roles in Somalia in 1992 and Kosovo in 1999.

For much of the 1980s, as the Iran-Iraq conflict and its associated tanker war in the Gulf intensified, the UAE Armed Forces were in a state of high alert. In the face of the threat of repercussions from the conflict, the GCC carried out the October 1983 Operation Peninsula Shield (its first joint military exercise). This led to the decision to create the joint Peninsula Shield Force the following year.

Iran and Iraq targeted each other's oil facilities and attempted to block oil exports by attacking neutral shipping. Kuwaiti tankers tended to ship Iraqi oil, and were frequently targeted by Iran. The US re-flagged Kuwaiti oil tankers with US flags and assigned warships to escort Kuwaiti tankers through the Strait of Hormuz. The operation's first casualty, the Earnest Will, was an American frigate hit by Iraqi Exocet missiles. The Iranians laid mines in the Gulf, leading to the mining of the Bridgeton (a re-flagged Kuwaiti tanker).

The escalation continued; US forces attacked Iranian Revolutionary Guard units based on oil platforms, destroying three Iranian rigs. In July 1988, the USS Vincennes was involved in an action against harrying Iranian gunboats. The Vincennes mistakenly targeted an Iranian Airbus A300 flying a scheduled route from Tehran to Dubai and shot it down, with the loss of all 290 passengers and crew. Two weeks later, the Iranians accepted UN Security Council Resolution 598 calling for an end to the war.

== 21st century ==
=== 2000–2020 ===
The Burj Khalifa, the world's tallest structure and building since its topping out in 2009.

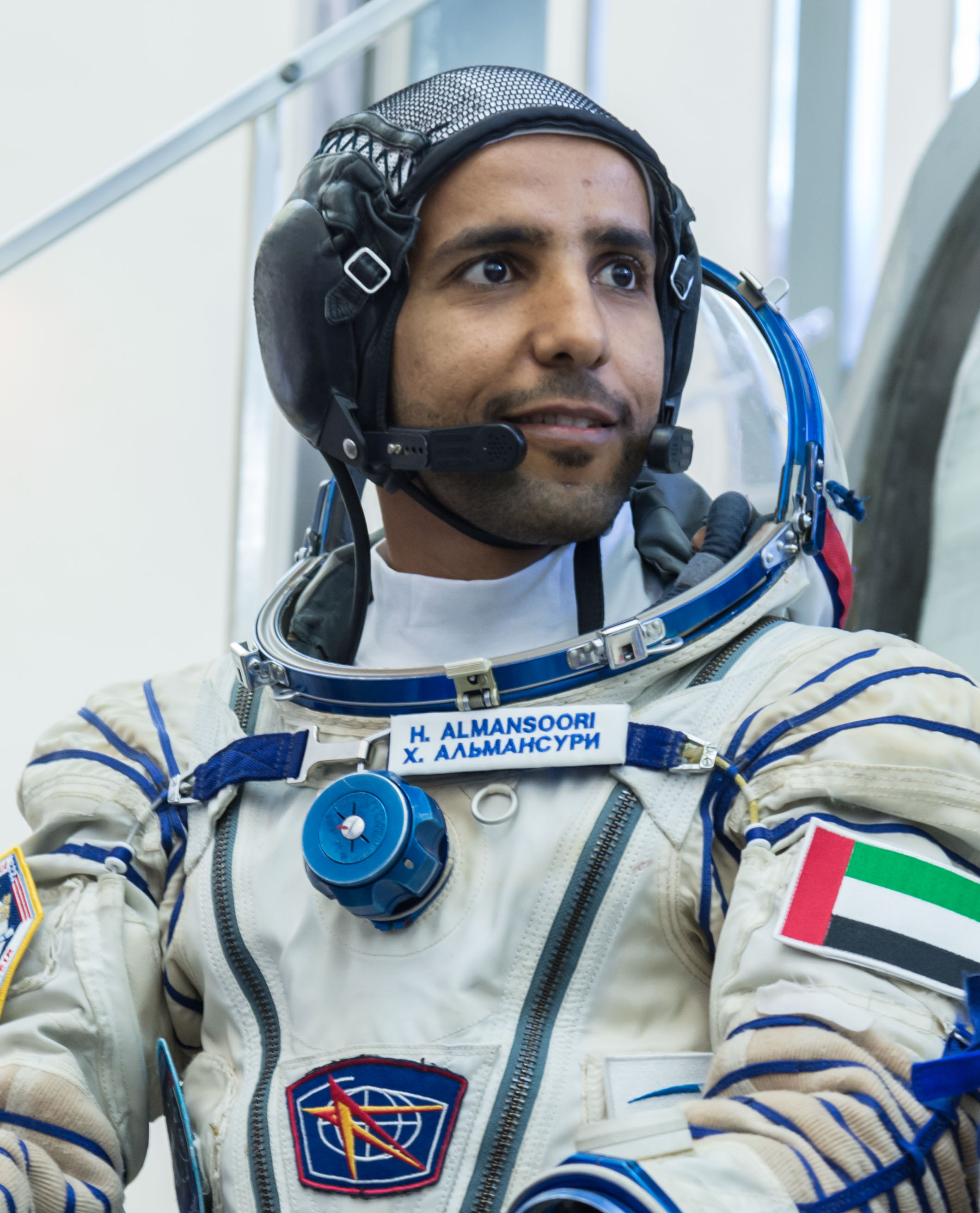
Hazza Al Mansouri, the first Emirati astronaut, who was launched on the Soyuz MS-15 spacecraft to the International Space Station on 25 September 2019.

After the 9/11 terrorist attacks on the United States, the UAE was identified as a financial centre used by Al-Qaeda to transfer money to the hijackers. The nation immediately cooperated with the United States, freezing accounts tied to suspected terrorists and clamping down on money laundering. The country had signed a military-defence agreement with the United States in 1994, and with France in 1977.

The UAE supported military operations from the United States and other coalition nations engaged in the invasion of Afghanistan (2001) and Iraq (2003) and operations supporting the global war on terrorism for the Horn of Africa at Al Dhafra Air Base, outside Abu Dhabi. The airbase also supported Allied operations during the 1991 Persian Gulf War and Operation Enduring Freedom.

The UAE's first president, Sheikh Zayed bin Sultan Al Nahyan, died on 2 November 2004. His eldest son, Sheikh Khalifa bin Zayed Al Nahyan, succeeded him as ruler of Abu Dhabi. In accordance with the constitution, the UAE's Supreme Council of Rulers elected Khalifa president. Sheikh Mohammad bin Zayed Al Nahyan succeeded Khalifa as crown prince of Abu Dhabi. Sheikh Maktoum bin Rashid Al Maktoum, the prime minister of the UAE and the ruler of Dubai, died in January 2006; and Crown Prince Sheikh Mohammed bin Rashid Al Maktoum assumed both roles.

In March 2006, the United States forced the state-owned Dubai Ports World to relinquish control of terminals at six major American ports. Critics of the ports deal feared an increased risk of terrorist attack, saying that the UAE was home to two of the 9/11 hijackers.

In December 2006, the UAE prepared for its first election to determine half the members of UAE's Federal National Council from 450 candidates. Only 7,000 Emirati citizens (less than one percent of the Emirati population) had the right to vote in the election; the manner of selection was opaque, but women were included in the electorate.

In August 2011, the Middle East experienced a number of pro-democratic uprisings popularly known as the Arab Spring. The UAE had comparatively little unrest but in a high-profile case, five political activists were arrested for defamation by insulting heads of state (UAE president Khalifa bin Zayed Al Nahyan, vice president Mohammed bin Rashid Al Maktoum, and Abu Dhabi crown prince Mohammed bin Zayed Al Nahyan) on an anti-government website. The trial of the UAE Five attracted international publicity and protest from a number of human-rights groups, including Amnesty International, which called the five men prisoners of conscience. The defendants were convicted and given two- to three-year prison sentences on 27 November 2011.

On 25 September 2019, Hazza Al Mansouri flew aboard the Soyuz MS-15 spacecraft to the International Space Station, where he stayed for eight days as the first Emirati in space.

=== Since 2020 ===
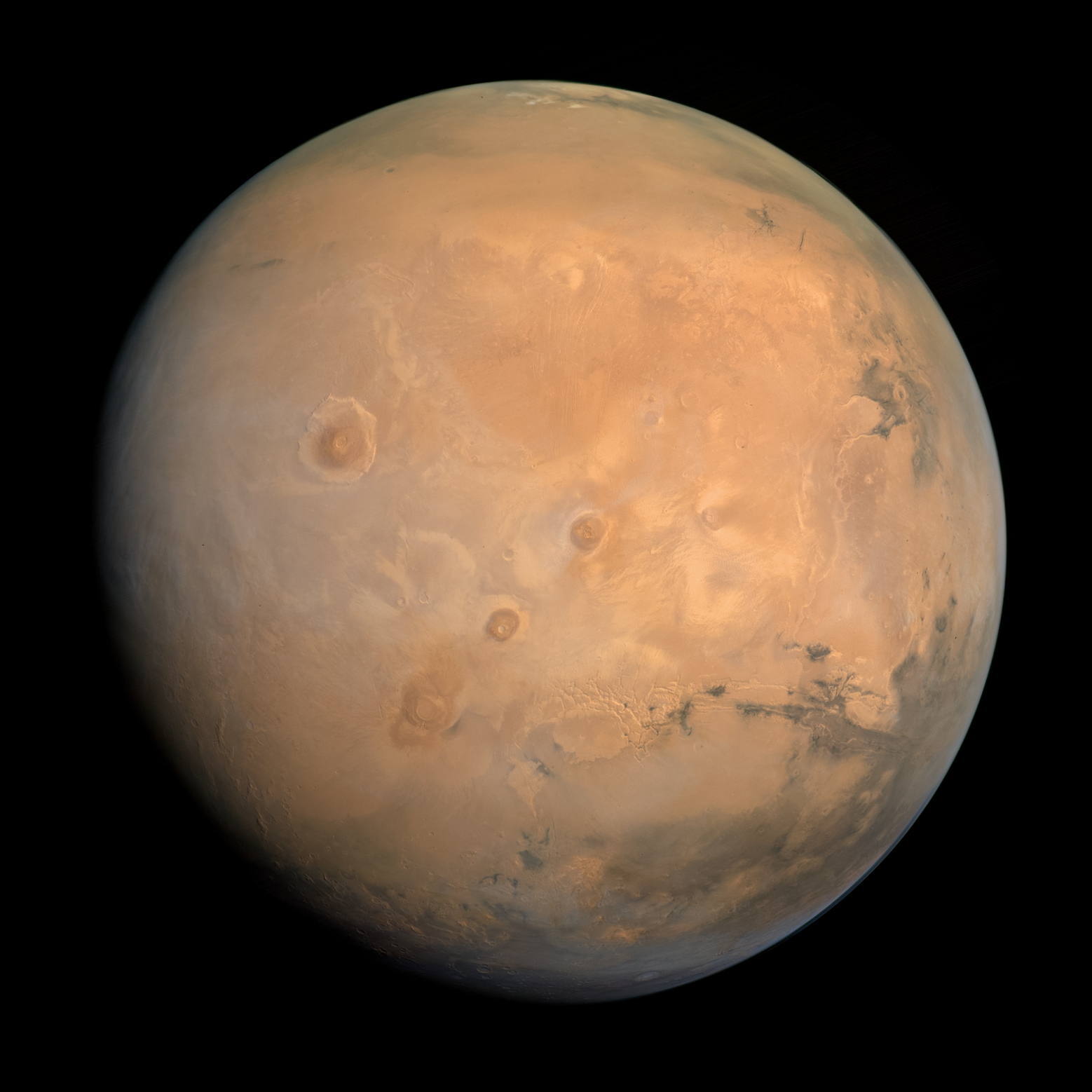
Photo of Mars taken by the Emirates Mars Mission's Hope probe.

The first confirmed COVID-19 case in the United Arab Emirates was announced on 29 January 2020. It was the first country in the Middle East to report a confirmed case.

The United Arab Emirates launched the Emirates Mars Mission that year, a United Arab Emirates Space Agency uncrewed space exploration mission to Mars. The Hope probe was launched on 19 July 2020, and went into orbit around Mars on 9 February 2021. The United Arab Emirates became the first Arab country and the fifth country to reach Mars, and the second country to enter Mars' orbit on its first try (after India). In April 2023, The New York Times reported an updated global map of Mars based on images from the Hope spacecraft.

During the early 2020s, the UAE began overhauling its criminal and civil laws. It legalized alcohol, ended lighter punishments for honor killings, enacted harsher punishments for rape and sexual harassment, allowed foreigners to follow their home-country's family laws for marriage and inheritance rather than Sharia, reduced penalties for drugs and having a child when unmarried, and allowed unmarried couples to live together. Economic changes have allowed foreigners to own businesses without a UAE partner. The UAE moved to a Saturday-Sunday weekend at the beginning of 2022, with Friday a working half-day. Homosexuality remained illegal, although a new 21+ age rating allowed uncensored movies to be shown.

Expo 2020 was a World Expo hosted by Dubai from 1 October 2021 to 31 March 2022. Originally scheduled for 20 October 2020 to 10 April 2021, it was postponed due to the COVID-19 pandemic in the United Arab Emirates. Despite the postponement, organizers kept the name Expo 2020 for marketing and branding purposes. The event recorded more than 24 million visits in its six months.

On 22 February 2022, the Museum of the Future was opened by the government. The date was chosen because it is a palindrome date. The museum is devoted to Dubai's innovative and futuristic technologies. On 14 May 2022, Sheikh Mohamed bin Zayed Al Nahyan was elected as UAE president after the death of Sheikh Khalifa bin Zayed Al Nahyan.

The Emirates Lunar Mission was the first mission to the Moon from the UAE. The mission by Mohammed bin Rashid Space Centre (MBRSC) sent a lunar rover named Rashid to the Moon aboard ispace's Hakuto-R Mission 1 lander. Launched on 11 December 2022 on a Falcon 9 Block 5 rocket, the rover attempted to land in the Atlas crater. On 25 April 2023, seconds before the attempted landing, communication with the Hakuto-R lander was lost. The ispace team confirmed that the spacecraft had crashed into the Moon and was destroyed.

=== The UAE and the 2026 Iran War ===
Following Operation Epic Fury, Iran launched missiles to Israel and Gulf States, including the UAE; damage was reported in Al-Dhafra Airbase, Fairmont the Palm Hotel, Burj Al-Arab, and Dubai International Airport.

== See also ==
- History of Asia
  - History of the Middle East
    - History of Dubai and Timeline of Dubai
    - History of Ras Al Khaimah
    - History of Oman
    - Timeline of Abu Dhabi
    - Archaeology of the United Arab Emirates
- President of the United Arab Emirates
- List of prime ministers of the United Arab Emirates
- National Library and Archives (UAE)
- Politics of the United Arab Emirates
