= Munay =

Munay'i
- Location within United Arab Emirates
- Coordinates: 24°56′57″N 56°9′7″E
- Country: United Arab Emirates
- Emirate: Ras Al Khaimah
- Elevation: 284 m (932 ft)

Munay is the name of a village in Ras Al Khaimah, one of the United Arab Emirates. It sits at the head of the Wadi Qor.
