= Dahaminah =

Bedouin tribe of the United Arab Emirates

The Dahaminah are a minor tribe from Ras Al Khaimah and Fujairah in the United Arab Emirates (UAE). They originally inhabited the area of Wadi Qor. At the turn of the 19th century there was a population of some 150 Dahaminah co-habiting with a number of members of the Manai'i tribe in the settlements along the Wadi Qor.
