= Al Nasla =

Al Naslah
- Location within United Arab Emirates
- Coordinates: 24°53′N 56°15′E
- Country: United Arab Emirates
- Emirate: Ras al-Khaimah

Al Nasla is a settlement in Ras Al Khaimah in the United Arab Emirates (UAE). It is situated in the Wadi Qor below Rafaq.

The mosque at Al Nasla, alongside 40 modern houses were built on order of Sheikh Rashid bin Saeed Al Maktoum. A remote community increasingly deserted by young people moving to the UAE's cities, Al Nasla's mostly deserted houses come alive during Eid, when family members return to the village.

Sheikh Rashid's son, Sheikh Mohammed, visited the village during a tour of the mountain areas in 2008.

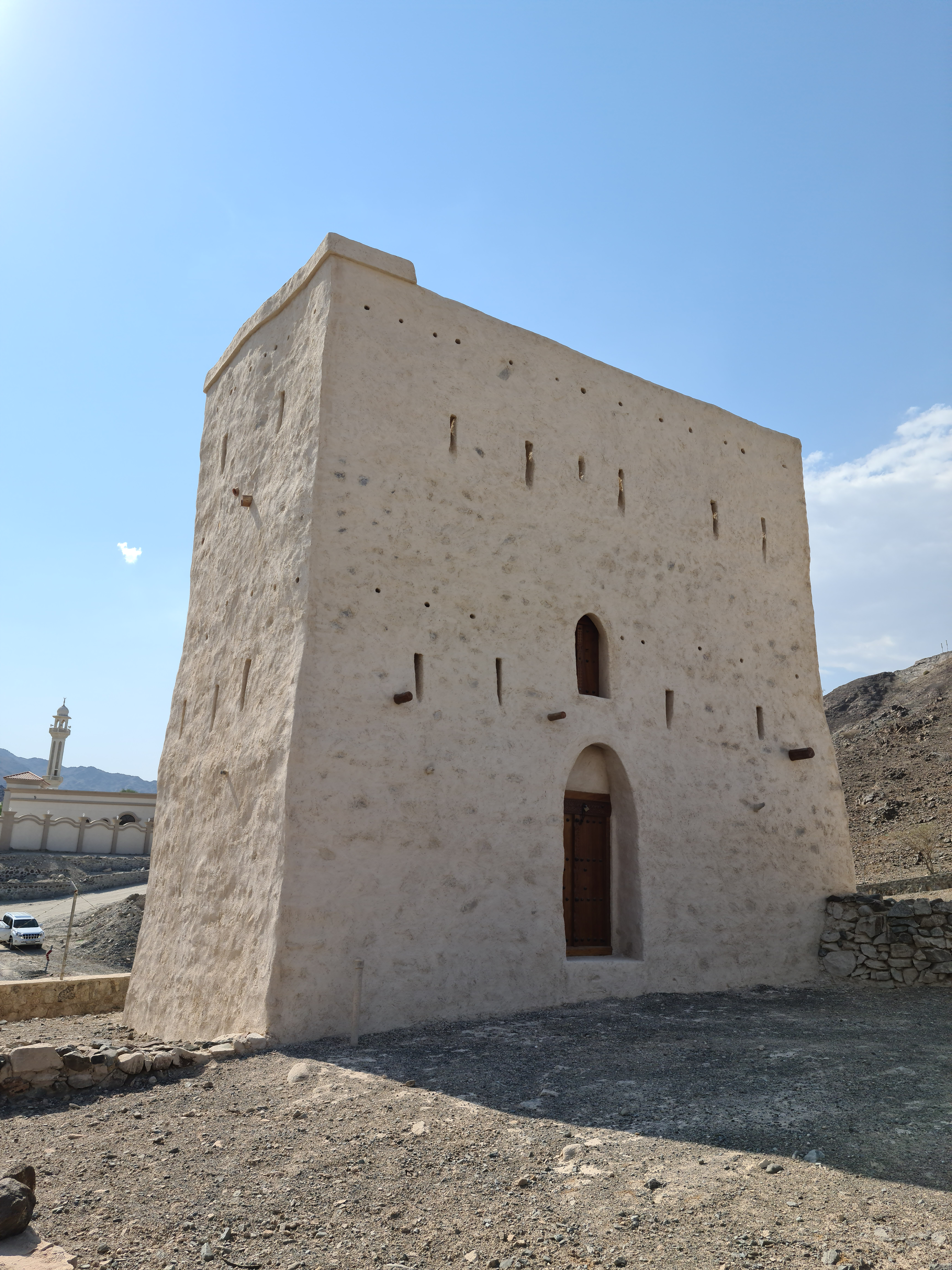
Al Nasla Fort

An Islamic era (19th century) fort at Al Nasla has recently been restored.
