= Al Qor =

- Location within United Arab Emirates
- Coordinates: 24°54′41″N 56°5′55″E
- Country: United Arab Emirates
- Emirate: Ras Al Khaimah
- Elevation: 401 m (1,316 ft)

Al Qor (Arabic: القور) is a settlement in Ras Al Khaimah, United Arab Emirates (UAE). The area is rich in archaeological sites and finds date human settlement back to the Umm Al Nar period – 2600 BCE. Al Qor is located within the Wadi Qor and is prone to intense flooding. It was traditionally home to the Bani Kaab tribe.
