= Rafaq =

Rafaq, رافاق
- Nickname: رافاق
- Location within United Arab Emirates
- Coordinates: 24°52′30″N 56°14′44″E
- Country: United Arab Emirates
- Emirate: Ras Al Khaimah
- Elevation: 320 m (1,050 ft)

Rafaq is the name of a settlement in Ras Al Khaimah in the United Arab Emirates (UAE), in the Wadi Qor. It was visited in 2008 by Mohammed bin Rashid Al Maktoum as part of a tour of remote mountain communities by the Ruler of Dubai.

It is the site of an Iron Age fortification.
