= Wadi Qor =

Wadi Qor وادي قور
- Location within United Arab Emirates
- Coordinates: 24°54′41″N 56°5′55″E
- Country: United Arab Emirates
- Emirate: Ras Al Khaimah
- Elevation: 401 m (1,316 ft)

Wadi Qor (Arabic: وادي قور) is a seasonal watercourse in the Hajar Mountains of Ras Al Khaimah, in the United Arab Emirates. The wadi runs from the mountain village of Al Qor, near the Dubai exclave of Hatta, through the villages of Huwaylat, Rafaq and Al Nasla before crossing the Omani border and fanning out to the Batinah plain and the Gulf of Oman north of the Omani coastal village of Bu Baqarah.

Traditionally a major trade route, the Wadi Qor forms one of the oldest caravan routes from the interior of the Gulf to the Batinah Coast. Its importance as a passage through the Hajar Mountains was eclipsed by the construction of the metalled road from Hatta to the Batinah coast.

== Extent ==
The wadi contains a number of Umm Al Nar era gravesites and has been a rich source of archaeological finds. Like many of the Hajar Mountain wadis, it is prone to heavy flooding. A number of the communities throughout the wadi are increasingly deserted by young people moving to the UAE's cities, and seasonal occupation of houses is common, for instance during the Eid celebrations, when family members return to the villages. The villages along the Wadi Qor were traditionally settled by members of the Dahaminah, Washahat and Bani Kaab tribes, as well as some Maharzah.

There is an Iron Age fort in the village of Rafaq. An Islamic era fort in the village of Al Nasla has been restored. A series of watchtowers dot the sides of the wadi along its course.

=== Waterways ===
The Wadi Qor also features a number of aflaj daudi, underground waterways or falaj, dug to distribute water for irrigation to fields from a mother spring or aquifer. The falaj daudi is distinguished from the falaj ghayli - open surface water channels and irrigation systems, or aflaj.

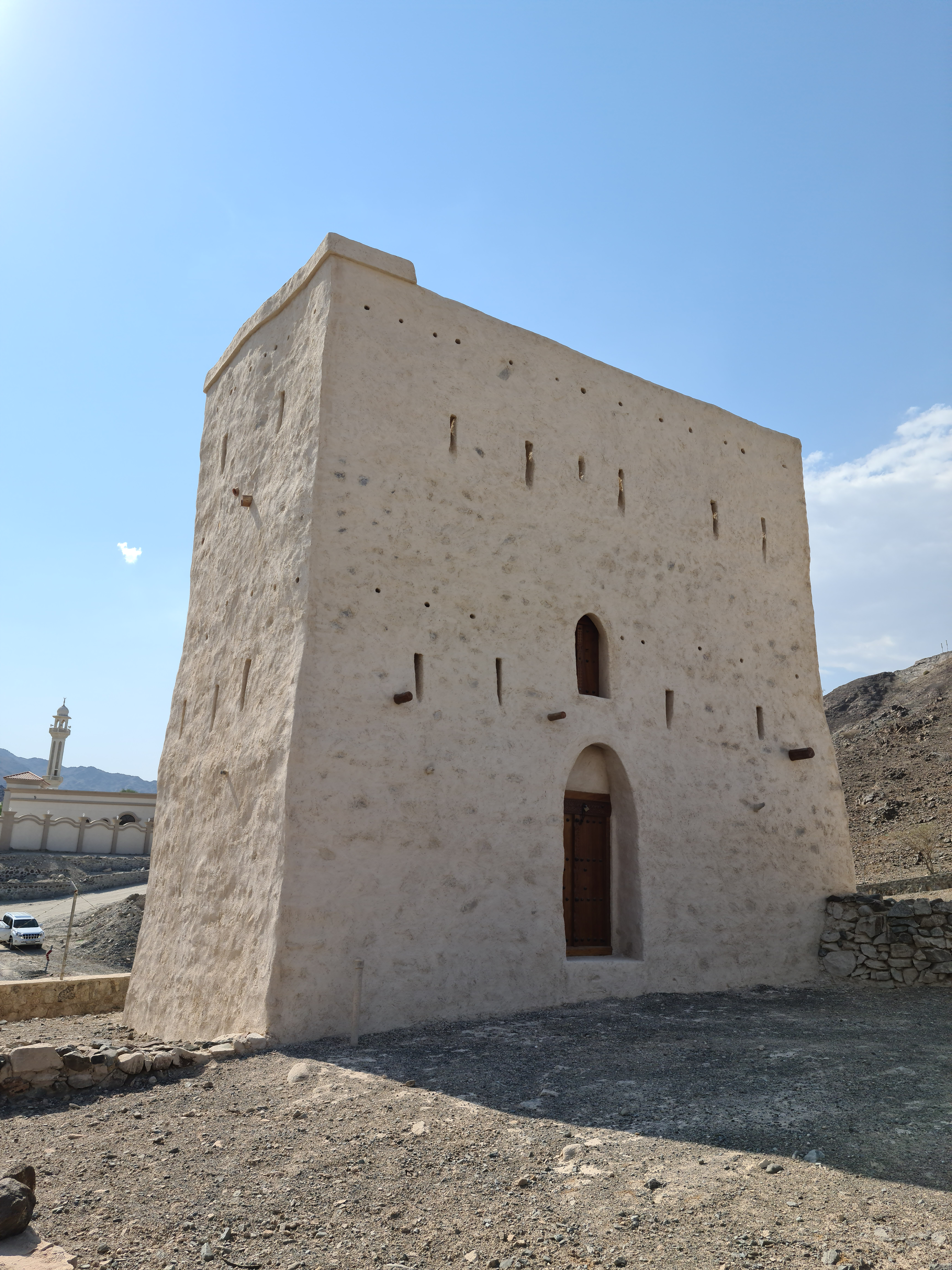
Al Nasla Fort in the Wadi Qor is an Islamic era fort, likely constructed in the 19th century.

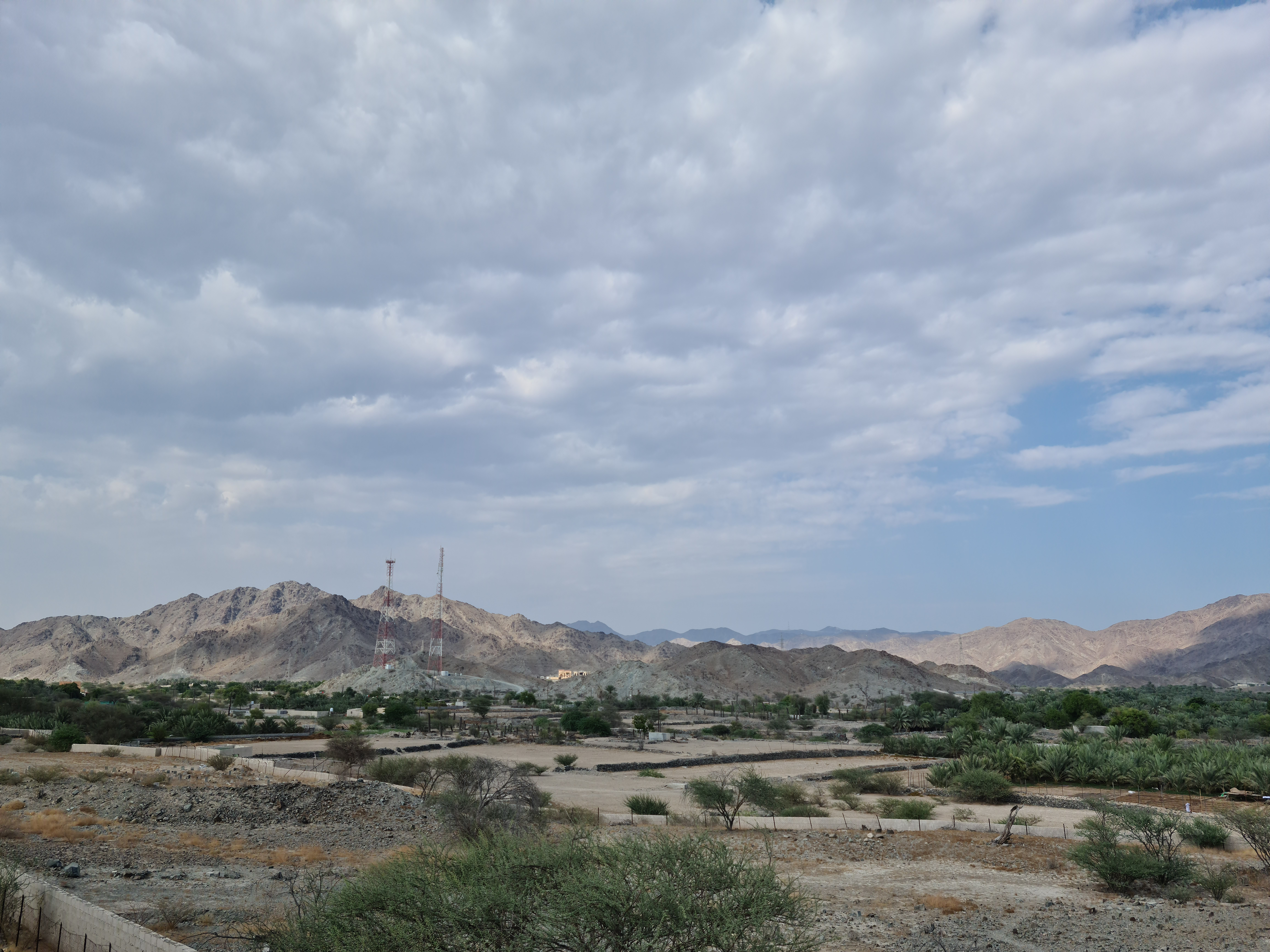
The Wadi Qor facing north at Huwailat

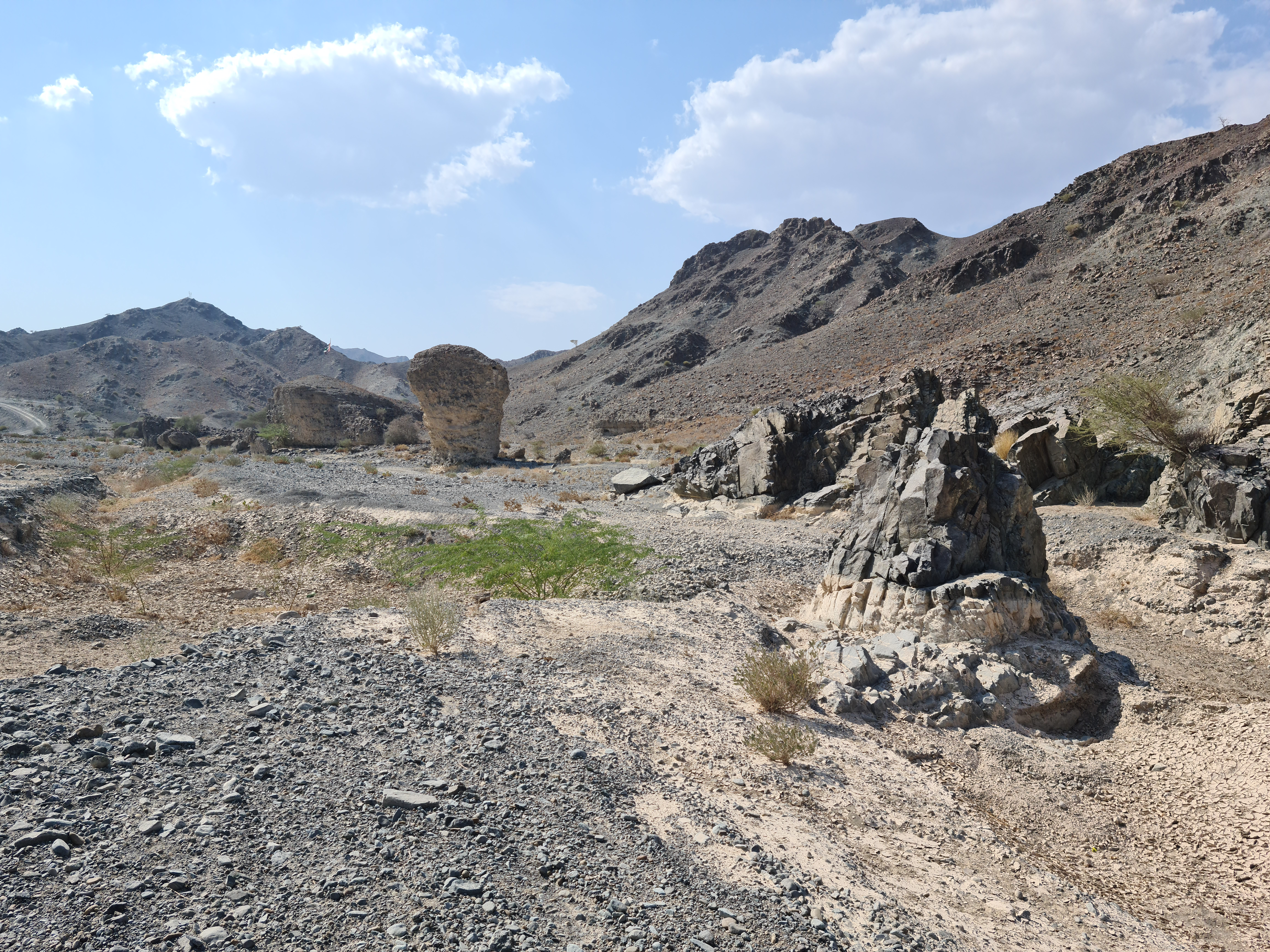
The Wadi Qor at Al Nasla, looking north

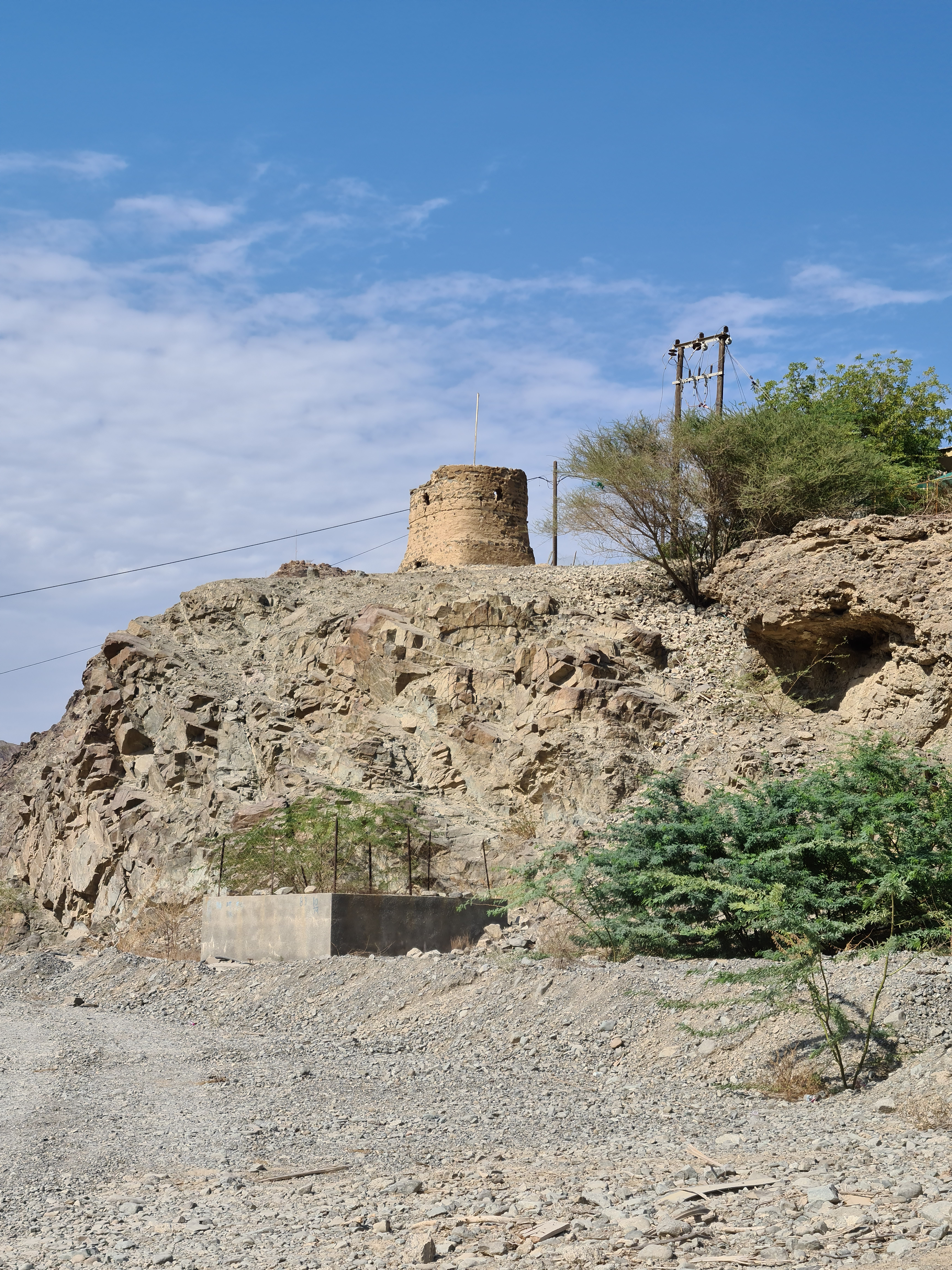
One of a series of (mostly dilapidated) watchtowers overlooking the Wadi Qor

== See also ==
- List of wadis of the United Arab Emirates
