= Derasat =

Bahraini government think tank

Derasat, or the Bahrain Center for Strategic, International & Energy Studies (دِراسات), is a government-sponsored think tank in Bahrain. Its name is the Arabic word for "studies". It was created in 2009 by King Hamad bin Isa Al Khalifa to make a contribution to the country's public policy decision-making.

== Leadership ==
Abdulla bin Ahmed bin Abdulla Al Khalifa, Undersecretary for International Affairs at the Ministry of Foreign Affairs of the Kingdom of Bahrain, became chairman of Derasat's Board of Trustees on 31 January 2017. The Board of Trustees was renewed at the same time by royal decree. As of 2026, Abdulla bin Ahmed bin Abdulla Al Khalifa is the chairman.

As of May 2021, Hamad Ebrahim Al Abdullah was Derasat's Executive Director, after succeeding Katadah Abdul Hameed Zaman in 2020. The previous Executive Director was Khalid Mohamed Al Ruwaihi. As of September 2026, Omar Al-Ubaydli is the organization's Director of Research.

== See also ==
- Arab Center for Research and Policy Studies
- Doha Institute for Graduate Studies
- Dubai Economic Council
- Gulf Research Center
- Bahrain Centre for Studies and Research
