= Gulf Research Center =

Think tank in Saudi Arabia

The Gulf Research Center (GRC) is a privately funded, non-partisan think tank, education provider and consultancy specializing in the Persian Gulf region. The GRC produces research from a Gulf perspective which redresses a current area studies imbalance wherein regional opinions and interests are underrepresented. Based in Jeddah, and the foundation, with offices in Geneva and in Brussels, the GRC was founded in July 2000 by Abdulaziz Sager, the current chairman.

== GRC activities ==
The Gulf Research Center focus is on four interdisciplinary areas: social science research, education, news media and consultancy. These include social science in the context of the Persian Gulf region, international relations and politics of the Gulf Cooperation Council (GCC) countries, E-Education, Executive Learning Programs, the GRC E-Library and the "Gulf in the Media" news portal.

Specialized GRC publications include Araa Magazine, an independent magazine about social, defense and security issues in the Gulf; Yemen Studies, a peer reviewed bilingual academic series about Yemen and Yemen-GCC relations; and the GRC Newsletter.

The GRC maintains cooperation agreements with major partners such as Emirates Bank, Shell, Glaxo Smith Kline, the University of Queensland, the Saudi Arabian Marketing and Agencies Company (SAMACO) group, the National Defence College, the Saudi Binladin Group, and the FRIDE Foundation.

== 2006 ==
Beginning with its 3rd Annual Conference in January 2006, the GRC took part in or organised over two dozen conferences, workshops and seminars which included:

- Master of Arts Program in International Relations in cooperation with the Free University of Berlin
- GCC-Korea Relations Workshop, the Green Gulf workshop in cooperation with the United Nations Environment Program
- The release of the Arabic version of the International Energy Outlook 2006
- Global Leadership and Young Arab Leaders conventions
- 8th Asia Security Conference
- Global Policy Council, organized by the Bertelsmann Stiftung
- Middle East 2006 conference, organized by the [www.gcsp.ch Geneva Center for Security Policy]
- The Doha Debates
- 7th Mediterranean Social and Political Research Meeting, Florence, Italy
- Windsor Energy Forum, London, England
- 7th International Security Forum, Zürich

GRC publications in 2006 included the Gulf Yearbook and the Green Gulf Report, ten research papers including "Impact of the Disbandment of the Iraqi army on the Security Situation in Iraq," ten Gulf papers including "The Arab Gulf States: Further steps towards political participation," ten Gulf Translations, and three Gulf Theses including one about GCC-EU relations.

== 2007 ==
GRC held its 4th Annual Conference, “The consequences of US Policies in the Gulf Region,” on January 13 and 14, 2007.

- Gulf News cites GRC analyst: "New Arabic channel to hit airwaves tomorrow" March 31, 2007.
- Edmonton Journal cites GRC research: "Attacks in Iraq deadlier: study" April 3, 2007.
- ArabianBusiness.com newsletter cites GRC senior consultant: "Opec idea to loom over gas producers meeting" April 5, 2007.
- Gulf Daily News cites GRC senior consultant: "Middle East 'must satisfy its own gas demand first'" April 6, 2007.
- Financial Times cites GRC security analyst: "Arab street warms to showman Ahmadi-Nejad" April 6, 2007.
- Gulf News cites GRC environment researcher: "Green technology is 'the way forward'" April 14, 2007.
- Gulf News cites GRC economics programme manager: "Dollar hits 26-year low against pound" April 19, 2007.
- Dubai City Guide names GRC among forum partners: "Arab and Asian Leaders Seek Common Values at Young Arab Leaders Global Action Forum" April 26, 2007

== 2024 ==
The GRC Foundation opened an office in Brussels, Belgium.

== See also ==
- Derasat
