= Dubai Economic Council =

Dubai-based think tank

Dubai Economic Council (Arabic: مجلس دبي الاقتصادي) is a think tank and policy-making advisory body specialising on the economy of Dubai. It is affiliated with the Government of Dubai.

== See also ==
- Derasat
