= Dubai Islands =

Islands in Dubai, United Arab Emirates

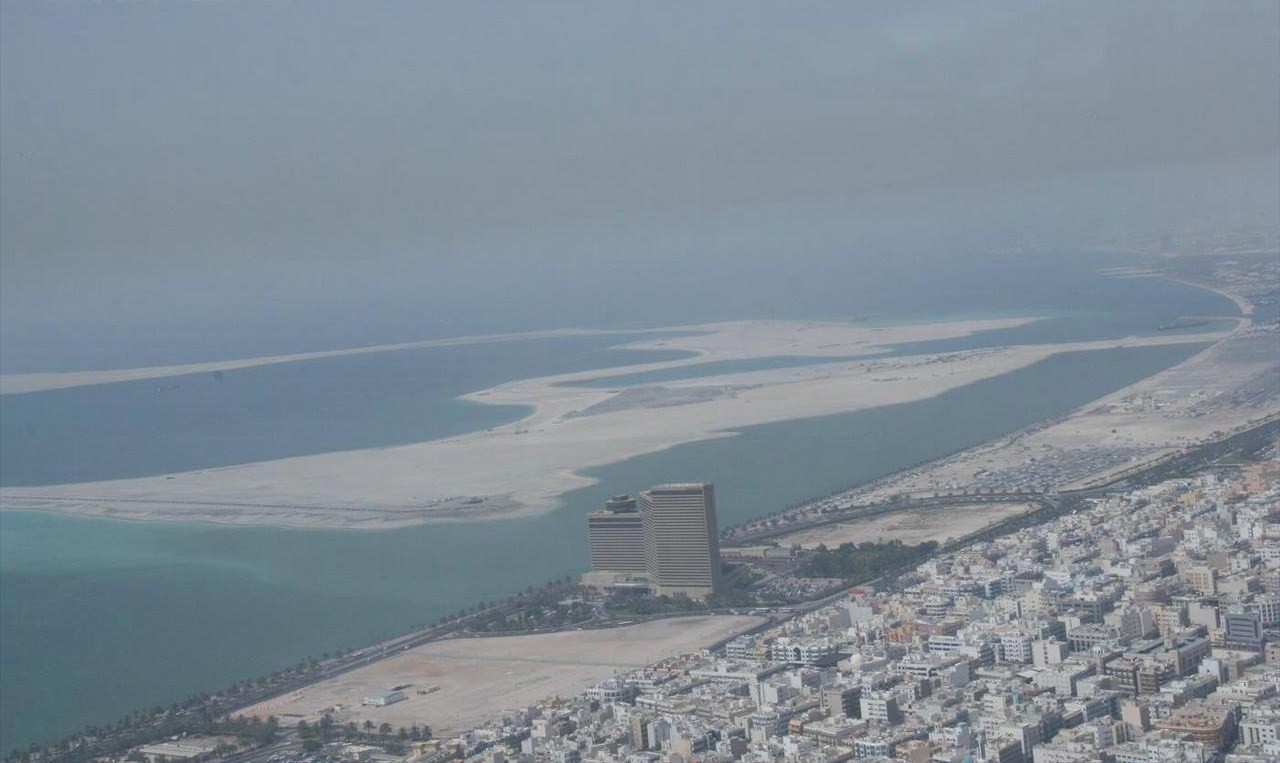
- View of Deira Islands from Deira, Dubai c. 2007
- Interactive map of Dubai Islands

Geography
- Coordinates: 25°19′N 55°19′E

Administration
- United Arab Emirates

The Dubai Islands (Arabic: جزر دبي), also known as Deira Islands (Arabic: جزر ديرة), are four artificial islands off the coast of Deira in Dubai, United Arab Emirates. The project was initially called Palm Deira and was planned to be part of the Palm Islands.

== History ==
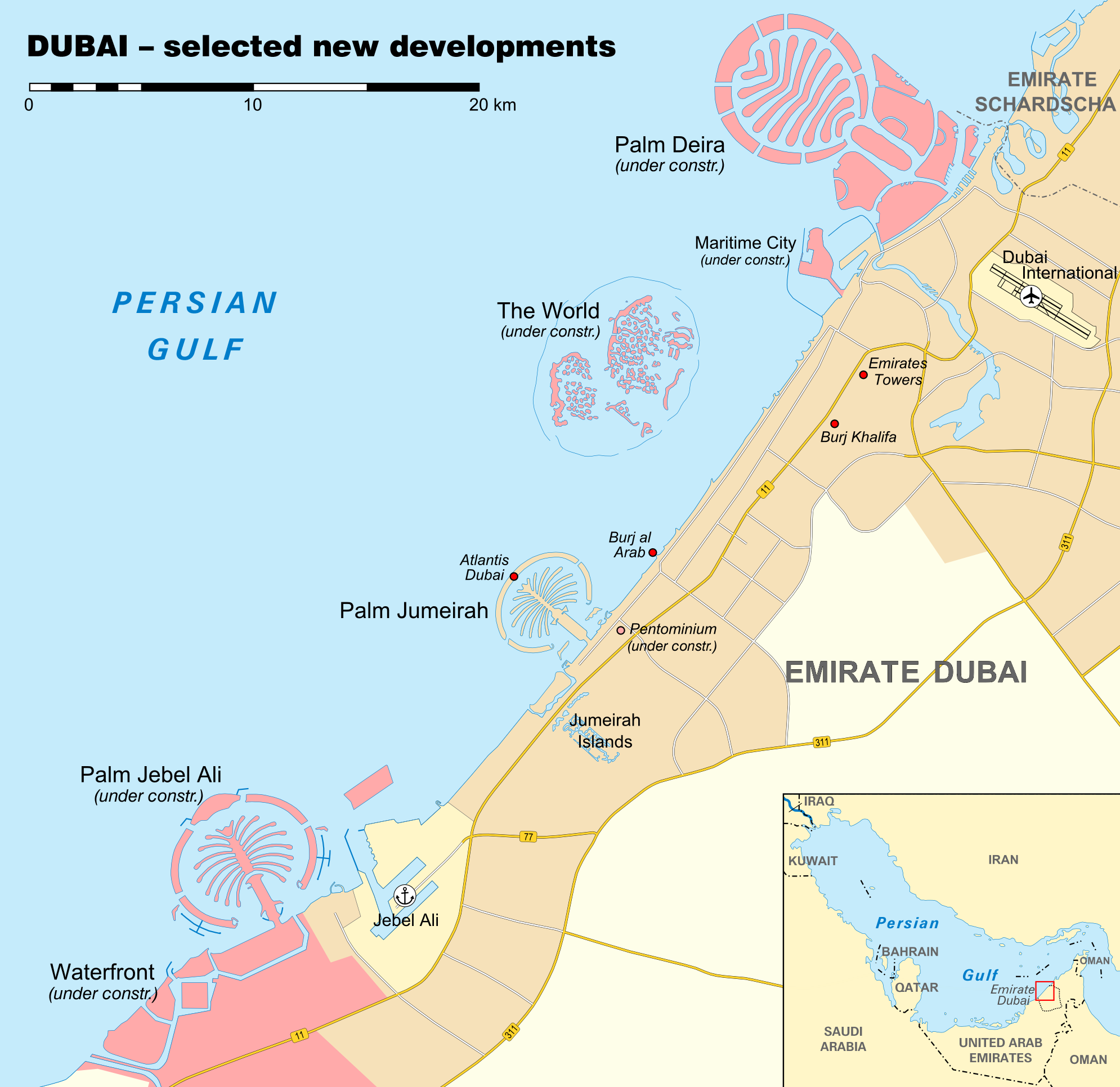
A 2010 project plan by Nakheel which was to include the Palm Jumeirah (opened), Palm Jebel Ali (under construction) and the Palm Deira.

=== Palm Deira ===
In 2004, Dubai developer Nakheel Properties launched the Palm Deira project as an 11 billion dirham property development off the coast of Deira in Dubai that was due to contain up to 8,000 villas. Dutch dredging contractor Van Oord was recruited to start the project in 2005. Malaysian design firm, Teo A. Khing Design Consultants (TAK), was appointed by Nakheel to redesign Palm Deira in 2007 with a focus on the island’s infrastructure and land plot configuration. By early October 2007, 20% of the initial palm island's reclamation was complete, with a total of 200 million cubic metres (7.1 billion cubic feet) of sand already used. Then in early April 2008, Nakheel announced that more than a quarter of the total area of the Palm Deira had been reclaimed. During the 2008 financial crisis, Nakheel had put projects like the Palm Jebel Ali, The World and Palm Deira on hold.

=== Renaming to Deira Islands ===
In October 2013, Nakheel re-branded and scaled down the project as Deira Islands. Deira Islands were developed to include the Deira Night Souk, Deira Mall, and Deira Island Towers and Boulevard on the islands to develop it into a shopping, retail, and housing waterfront. The project added 40 km (25 mi) of coastline and 21 km (13 mi) of beach to Dubai. In December 2016 a bridge linking the mainland to the islands was opened.

=== Renaming to Dubai Islands ===
In 2022, Nakheel rebranded itself and the project. It was renamed Dubai Islands, and it is expected to house 80 hotels. The project has been restarted and no official opening date has been announced.

In August 2022, Nakheel released the master plan for the islands.

== Hotels and resorts ==
The Dubai Islands currently have three hotels in operation, which represent the most significant development on the islands so far. The 800-key Hotel RIU Dubai opened on December 10, 2020, followed by the 607-key Centara Mirage Beach Resort Dubai on October 14, 2021 and the 159-key Park Regis by Prince Dubai Islands on March 2, 2024.

== Planned features ==
=== Deira Night Souk ===
The Deira Night Souk is planned to be a 1.9 km (1.2 mi) market place that stretch along the coast of the Deira Islands opposite the mainland. According to the developers, Deira Night Souk will be the biggest night market in the world, construction for which has been completed.

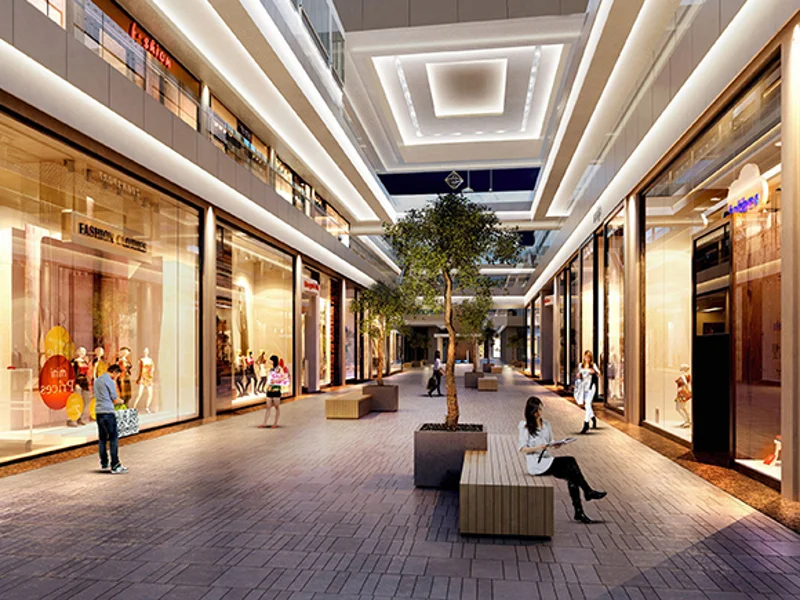
Render of the Deira Mall interior

=== Deira Mall ===
Deira Mall is planned to be a 600,000 m^{2} (6,500,000 sq ft) mall with 1,100 retail spaces that is being developed on the islands. The design contract of the mall was awarded in June 2014, though it has yet to complete the construction.

== See also ==
- The World, another artificial island project in Dubai
- Tourism in Dubai
- Developments in Dubai
