= Faruh Kurbanov =

Kazakh entrepreneur at the UAE, CEO of DIA Developments

Faruh Kurbanov (also spelled Farukh Kurbanov) is a businessman and a co-founder of DIA Holding, a construction and real estate group based in the United Arab Emirates. Kurbanov is from Karaganda, Kazakhstan, and began his career in construction.

== Career ==
In March 2016, Kurbanov was elected to the Temirtau City Maslikhat (local council) in Temirtau for electoral district No. 15, nominated by the Nur Otan party. In October 2016, a supplementary English-language centre offering free classes opened at School No. 22 in Temirtau, in his electoral district, on his initiative and with funding from private sponsors. In 2018, he submitted a deputy's inquiry to the regional ecology department regarding the environmental situation in Temirtau.

Kurbanov co-founded DIA Holding, a construction and real estate group with subsidiaries in the United Arab Emirates, Kazakhstan and Europe.

Kurbanov's first project with DIA Holding in Dubai was LuzOra, a residential development on Dubai Islands.

In April 2026, DIA Holding, which Kurbanov co-founded, announced a partnership with former UFC lightweight champion Khabib Nurmagomedov, beginning with the LuzOra development.

== Awards ==
In 2025, Kurbanov received the Real Estate Leader of the Year award at the Entrepreneur Middle East Leadership Awards 2025.
