= Arab Center for Research and Policy Studies =

- Formation: June 9, 2010; 16 years ago
- Type: Research Center
- Headquarters: Al Daayen, Qatar
- Official language: Arabic, English
- General Director: Azmi Bishara
- Website: www.dohainstitute.org/en/pages/index.aspx

The Arab Center for Research and Policy Studies (ACRPS) is an Arab research institute with particular interest in the social sciences, applied social sciences, regional history, and geostrategic affairs. To this end, the center coordinates and develops research, publications, projects and events on issues and challenges relevant to the Arab world. It primarily works in Arabic but publishes in both Arabic and English.

The center was established in 2010 and is based in Al Daayen, Qatar, with branch offices in Beirut, Tunis, Washington DC, Paris, and Madrid. An executive board of Arab academics and intellectuals oversees it. The center's general director is Palestinian academic and politician Azmi Bishara. The center is dedicated to producing local knowledge to better confront the challenges of the Arab world from within and without.

== Projects and programs ==
The center hosts several projects and programs, these include:

=== Arab Opinion Index ===
In 2011, the center launched the Arab Opinion Index. The project conducts polls in Arab countries to gauge public opinion on political, social and cultural issues. The index aims to “annually and systematically measure Arab public opinion on a variety of issues of interest to the Arab masses.”

=== The Arab Prize for Social Sciences and Humanities ===
To encourage Arab scholarship, the center established the Arab Prize for Social Sciences and Humanities in 2011. The results of this annual prize are announced at the annual Conference on the Social Sciences and Humanities. The prizes are awarded to both established scholars and young researchers.

=== Tarjuman - Book Translation Unit ===
The book translation unit makes high-quality contemporary works by non-Arab writers in the fields of economics, sociology, political science, management, culture, and art for Arab academics. Translated works include Fanon: The Postcolonial Imagination by Nigel Gibson and Confronting Culture: Sociological Vistas by John Hughson and David Inglis.

=== Doha Institute for Graduate Studies ===
In late 2013, the center announced the establishment of the Doha Institute for Graduate Studies, an institute for postgraduate studies in the social sciences, humanities, and public administration. The school was established in 2014 and started student enrollment in academic year 2015-16. It is a non-profit, private institution.

According to the institute's website, it “strives to prepare and qualify a select and competitively admitted body of students as capable academicians in advancing knowledge and public administration, and as professional leaders in the academic and executive fields”. The institute hosts the School of Social Sciences and Humanities, the School of Public Administration and Policy, and the Doha Historical Dictionary of the Arabic Language.

=== Jerusalem Story ===
Jerusalem Story is a website launched in June of 2022 with the stated goal of informing the English speaking public about Palestinian life in Jerusalem.

== Publications ==
The Arab center publishes books and three academic periodicals, Omran, Tabayyun and Siyasat Arabia. Printed book titles include: The Sectarian Question and the Problem of Minorities by Burhan Ghalioun, Reflections on the Meaning of Palestine by Alain Gresh, Stay Human by Vittorio Arrigoni, and Civil Society by Azmi Bishara. Omran and Tabayyun are quarterly peer-reviewed journals: the former focuses on the social sciences and the humanities more broadly, and the latter on thought, philosophy and cultural and literary criticism. Siyasat Arabia is published bi-monthly and focuses on political science, international relations, and policy studies. It aims to make such analyses accessible to non-specialist audiences and contribute to public debate in Arab countries. Its contributions are primarily written by the center's Policy Analysis Unit.

In addition, a number of publications are made available electronically on the center's website. These include select works from Omran and Tabayyun, policy analyses, case analyses, book reviews, assessment reports, and commentaries.

== Events and conferences ==
The Arab center organizes two annual conferences which attract Arab researchers from across the region: the Annual Conference on Social Sciences and Humanities and the Annual Conference of Strategic and Policy Studies Research. The former, generally held in March, addresses two themes. Past themes include: “From Hampered Growth to Sustainable Development: Which Socioeconomic Policies for Arab Countries?”, “Identity and Language in the Arab Homeland” (2012); "The Dialectic of Social Integration and the Building of Nation and State in the Arab Homeland", and the "Definition of Justice in the Arab Homeland today" (2013). The latter, normally held in December, brings together centers of research, policy studies, and strategic analysis in the Arab region. Past themes have included: “The Arab revolutions and geostrategic changes” in 2012, and “The Cause of Palestine and the Future of the Palestinian National Movement” in 2013. Additionally, the center holds conferences, symposia, and lectures.

== See also ==
- Derasat
- Doha Institute for Graduate Studies
- Middle Eastern studies
- Middle East Studies Association
