= The Doha Historical Dictionary of Arabic =

Online Arabic etymological dictionary

The Doha Historical Dictionary of the Arabic Language
- Native name: معجم الدوحة التاريخي للغة العربية
- Website type: Online encyclopedia, Online dictionary
- Available in: Arabic
- Country of origin: Qatar
- Website: https://www.dohadictionary.org/
- Registration: Optional
- Launched: 11 December 2018

The Doha Historical Dictionary of the Arabic Language (Arabic: معجم الدوحة التاريخي للغة العربية) is a free online etymological dictionary that aims to comprehensively document the historical development of the Arabic language. The project is supported by the Arab Center for Research and Policy Studies and the Qatari government, and headed by the Doha Institute for Graduate Studies.

It documents Arabic lemmas by attesting their first appearances in written texts or inscriptions, traces their development of their meanings within their historical, linguistic, and terminological contexts, and indicates their cognates in other Semitic languages.

The project was officially launched on 25 May 2013 and announced its completion on 22 December 2025, coinciding with the celebration of UN Arabic Language Day. Upon the announcement of its completion, the corpus contained over a billion Arabic words drawn from various Arabic texts and inscriptions spanning two centuries. The compilation of the dictionary was contributed to by 500 researchers across the Arab World. The dictionary remains under continuous development as it attempts to document contemporary developments in the language.

== Establishment ==
On 25 May 2013, the Arab Center for Research and Policy Studies (ACRPS) in Doha announced the launch of the Doha Historical Dictionary of Arabic project following a series of meetings, academic deliberations, and the formation of its academic board comprising a select group of prominent Arabic linguistics and lexicographers. The project was funded by the Emir of Qatar Tamim bin Hamad bin Khalifa Al Thani and the Arab Center for Research and Policy Studies.

Azeddine Bouchikhi, a Morroccan professor of language and linguistics was appointed as executive director of the project.

Amzi Bishara, the general director of the Arab Center for Research and Policy Studies commented that the reasoning behind the project's name was because "the project is also a precious gift from Doha to the Arab people as a whole".

== Compilation ==
Over five hundred university professors, experts, and scholars from across the Arab world contributed to the compilation of the dictionary, including Jordan, the United Arab Emirates, Tunisia, Algeria, Saudi Arabia, Syria, Iraq, Palestine, Qatar, Kuwait, Lebanon, Libya, Egypt, Morocco, Mauritania, Yemen, Sudan, and Oman. Members of the lexicographical teams were also provided with courses and workshops by the ACRPS.

The compilation of the dictionary was divided into three primary phases.

=== Phase One ===
The first phase of the project spanned five years, with the first two years devoted to the preparation of the methodologies, systems, and computerized databases for required for the compilation of the dictionary.

The following three years saw the indexing of one hundred thousand lemmas from historical texts and inscriptions covering the span of seven hundred years before 200 A.H. (800 C.E.). The first phase was completed on 10 December 2018, and the launch of the web portal for the dictionary was officially announced the next day on 11 December by the Emir of Qatar, Tamim bin Hamad bin Khalifa Al Thani.

=== Phase Two ===
The second phase of the project involved compiling entries from the period between 200 A.H. (800 C.E.) to 500 A.H. (1107 C.E.), and covers around 200,000 lexical entries. The completion of phase two was officially announced on the start of 2023 on January 1.

=== Phase Three ===
Phase three of the project consists of compiling words from 500 A.H. (1107 C.E.) onward, including contemporary usages.

=== Completion ===
On 22 December 2025, coinciding with UN Arabic Language Day, the official completion of the dictionary was announced in Lusail, Qatar in collaboration with the Emir of Qatar Tamim bin Hamad bin Khalifa Al Thani and the Arab Center for Research and Policy Studies. Upon completion it featured over 300,000 lexical entries, 10,000 root entries, and a textual corpus exceeding one billion words.

The director of the project, Azeddine Bouchikhi, noted that while the dictionary's compilation has been officially completed, work will continue in order to expand and update its existing corpus, as well as to reflect contemporary developments in language usage.

== Web Portal ==
On 11 December 2018, following the announcement of the completion of the first phase of the project, the web portal was officially launched making the corpus publicly available to internet users. The portal includes an introduction with additional information about the dictionary such as its identity, characteristics, sources, and compilation. It also details the dictionary's methodology, and guidelines and regulations.

The website enables users to search its corpus by entering a word or root. Entries for each sense feature a dated and cited reference to its first attestation. Users can also look up cognate roots in other Semitic languages (such as Ugaritic and Aramaic), statistics, and details about the sources used in each entry.
