= Economy of Dubai =

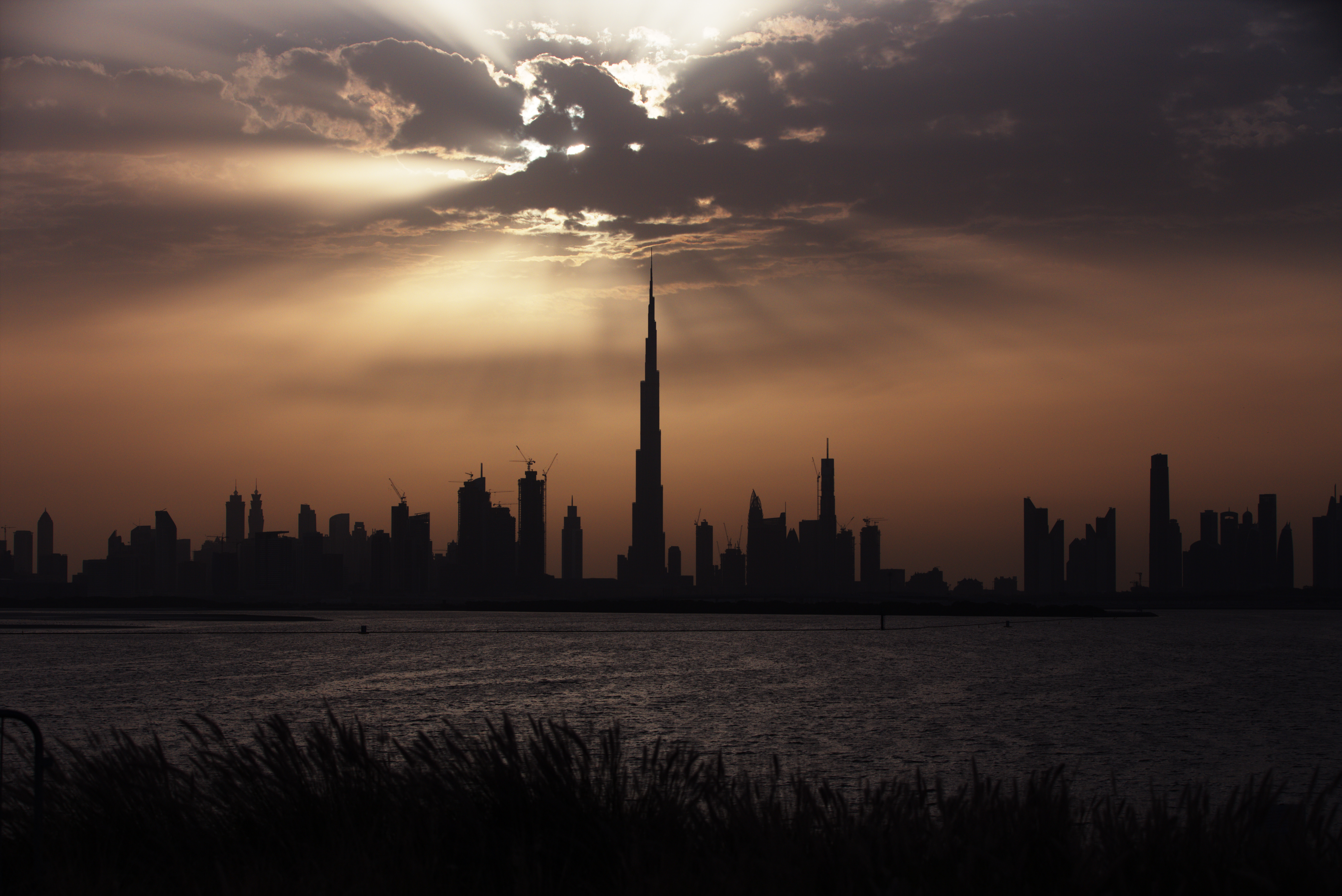
Skyline of Downtown Dubai; Burj Khalifa, the world's tallest building, is visible at the center

The economy of Dubai's gross domestic product of the calendar year 2023 as of January 2024 is AED429 billion (US$116.779 billion) (US$169 billion) and (US$247 billion in Metro(2025)). Dubai has substantially transformed over the last couple of decades. More than 90% of the population are foreigners.

The International Herald Tribune described it as "centrally-planned free-market capitalism". Oil production, which once accounted for 50% of Dubai's gross domestic product, contributes less than 1% today. In 2018, wholesale and retail trade represented 26% of the total GDP; transport and logistics, 12%; banking, insurance activities and capital markets, 10%; manufacturing, 9%; real estate, 7%; construction, 6%; tourism, 5%.

Dubai became important ports of call for Western manufacturers. Most of the new city's banking and financial centres were headquartered in the port area. Dubai maintained its importance as a trade route through the 1970s and 1980s. The city of Dubai has a free trade in gold and until the 1990s was the hub of a "brisk smuggling trade" of gold ingots to India, where gold import was restricted.

Dubai has sought to boost itself as a tourism destination by building hotels and developing real estate. Port Jebel Ali, constructed in the 1970s, has the largest man-made harbor in the world, but is also increasingly developing as a hub for service industries such as IT and finance, with the new Dubai International Financial Centre (DIFC). The Emirates airline was founded by the government in 1985 and is still state-owned; based at Dubai International Airport, it carried over 49.7 million passengers in 2015. The government has set up industry-specific free zones throughout the city in hopes of giving a boost to Dubai property. Internet access is restricted in most areas of Dubai with a proxy server filtering out sites deemed to be against cultural and religious values of the UAE.

Due to financial secrecy, low taxes, and valuable real estate, Dubai has become an appealing destination for money launderers, criminals, corrupt political figures and sanctioned businesspeople seeking to launder or hide money.

During the 2008 financial crisis, Dubai almost defaulted and, therefore, was obliged to downsize and restructure suffering state entities. The International Monetary Fund (IMF) stated in 2019 that Dubai's debt exceeded 100% of its GDP. Abu Dhabi rolled over a bailout loan of $20 billion to Dubai to save it.

== Corporations ==
During the first quarter of 2015, Dubai saw a 12.5% rise in the number of new registered companies as 9,317 new firms registered with the Dubai Trade, and this had brought the total number of registered companies in Dubai to 106,000.

Between January and August 2017, Dubai issued licenses for 249,000 businesses, making up 46.8% of the total number of licenses issued across the UAE during that period.

== Main economic drivers ==
=== Travel and tourism ===
Tourism is a major economic source of income in Dubai and part of the Dubai government's strategy to maintain the flow of foreign cash into the emirates. The tourism sector contributed in 2017 about $41 billion to the GDP, making up 4.6% of the GDP, and provided some 570,000 jobs, accounting for 4.8% of total employment. The contribution of the sector to the GDP rose by 138% during the years 2007–2017.

The Dubai International Airport (DXB) recorded 83.6 million passengers in 2016, and 14.9 million visitors stayed in Dubai hotels in the same year, a rise of 5% from 2015.

Since the Abraham Accords peace agreement was signed on Sept. 15, 2020, over 50,000 Israelis visited the UAE as daily direct flights between Tel Aviv and Dubai were operated even during the COVID-19 pandemic as the two countries declared each other ‘green zones,' sparing travellers the quarantine periods. On Dec. 26, 2020, an order signed by Israel's Health Ministry Director-General Chezy Levy went into effect, requiring all returnees from Dubai to enter a 14-day quarantine.

=== Real estate and property ===
The government's decision to diversify from a trade-based but oil-reliant economy to one that is service- and tourism-oriented resulted in the property boom from 2004 to 2008. Construction on a large scale has turned Dubai into one of the fastest-growing cities in the world. The property boom is largely driven by megaprojects such as the off-shore Palm Islands and The World, and the inland Dubai Marina, Burj Khalifa complex, Dubai Waterfront, Business Bay, Dubailand and Jumeirah Village.

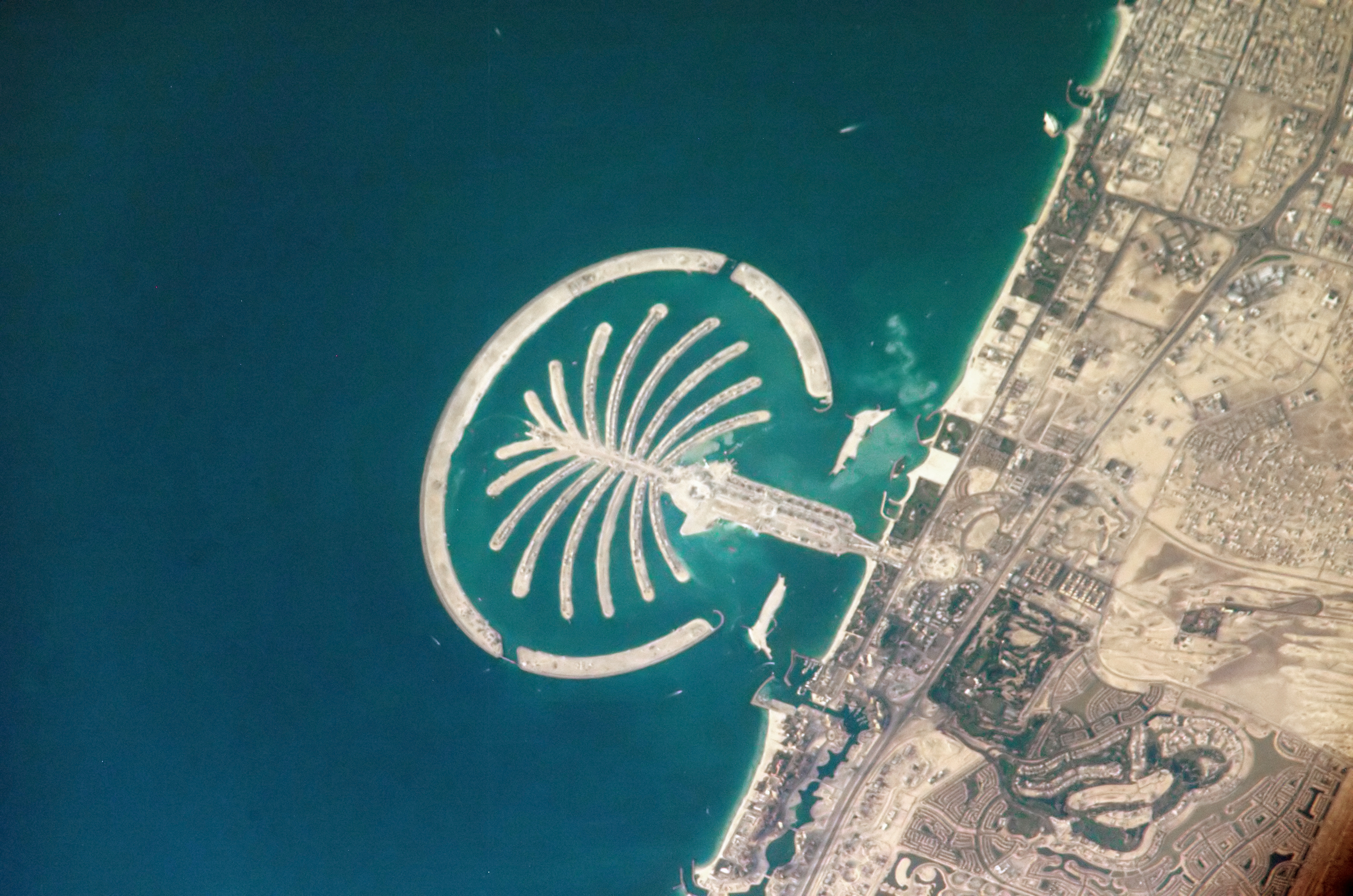
The Palm Jumeirah, the world's largest man-made island

Dubai is home to skyscrapers such as Emirates Towers, which are the 12th and 24th tallest buildings in the world, and the Burj-al-Arab hotel, located on its artificial island and currently the world's fifth tallest hotel.

Also under construction is what is planned to become Dubai's new central business district, named Business Bay. The project, when completed, will feature 500 skyscrapers built around an artificial extension of the existing Dubai Creek.

In February 2005, the construction of Dubai Waterfront was announced, it will be 2½ times the size of Washington, D.C., roughly seven times the size of the island of Manhattan. Dubai Waterfront will be a mix of canals and islands full of hotels and residential areas that will add 800 km (500 mi) of man-made waterfront. It will also contain Al Burj, another one of the tallest buildings in the world.

Dubai has also launched Dubai Science Park (previously DuBiotech and merged with EnPark). This is a new business park to be targeted at biotechnology companies working in pharmaceuticals, medical fields, genetic research and biodefense.

One of Dubai's plans in 2006 was for a 30-story, 200-apartment skyscraper that will slowly rotate at its base, making a 360-degree revolution once a week. The world's first rotating skyscraper was to be in the center of the Dubailand complex.

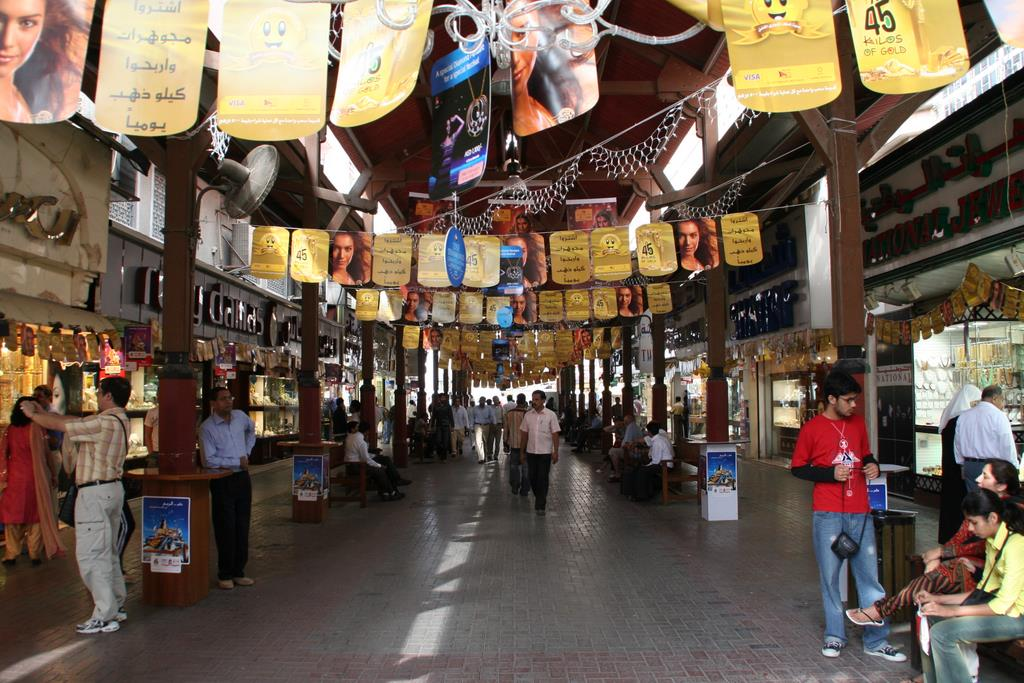
There are over 300 stores in the Gold Souk.

The International Media Production Zone is a project targeted at creating a hub for printers, publishers, media production companies, and related industry segments. Launched in 2003, the project was scheduled to be completed in 2006.

In May 2006 the Bawadi was announced, with a planned 27 billion US-dollar investment intended to increase Dubai's number of hotel rooms by 29,000, doubling it from the current figure offers now. The largest complex was to be called "Asia, Asia" and was planned to be the largest hotel in the world with more than 6,500 rooms.

Expatriates of various nationalities brought capital into Dubai in the early 2000s. Iranian expatriates were estimated to have invested up to $200 billion in Dubai. From 2005 to 2009, trade between Dubai and Iran tripled to $12 billion.

Dubai nationals have also purchased real estate in New York City and London. Purchases in 2005 included New York's 230 Park Avenue (formerly known as the New York Central Building or the Helmsley Building) and Essex House on Central Park South.

The Dubai property boom of the mid-2000s peaked in 2008 and plummeted in a wave of activity that saw large-scale projects, including partially completed properties, abandoned. Many developers failed, while others, including those with government backing, entered into debt-restructuring deals with their lenders. By 2012 the market began picking up steam again. 2013 was a stellar year with prices accelerating significantly, however, the government and industry players began putting in place measures that would safeguard against another bubble developing. One notable difference is the number of cash buyers compared to those in previous years who borrowed heavily. Part of the reason for the current cash surge is the influx of investment from troubled countries.

In September 2013, the Dubai Land Department increased property transfer fees from 2 to 4%. In early 2014 the government regulator imposed restrictions on outside-companies acquiring real estate in the emirate, insisting such companies had to have a presence in Dubai, and had to be owned by a natural person or persons, and not by another company. The measures were largely seen as a means to dampen speculation in property prices.

Major real estate companies in Dubai actively attract new investors from abroad, concluding partnerships with real estate portals and investment foundations. In 2018, Ellington Properties signed a partnership with Beike, one of the major China real estate listing portals. As per the agreement, Beike "will build awareness of Ellingtons premium Dubai real estate offering to Chinese investors"

In July 2019, more than 500 people lost their jobs following an economic downfall observed in the second quarter of 2019, following which Jumeirah Group LLC implemented job cuts. Dubai's economy weighs in on its tourism sector. Hotel occupancy fell to 67% in the second quarter of 2019, the lowest second-quarter occupancy since 2009. JLL predicted at the time that "further declines in performance are expected over the next 12 months before the hotel market recovers on the back of strong visitor arrivals growth associated with Expo 2020."

Due to the COVID-19 pandemic, real estate prices and overall demand for property dropped in 2020. Cavendish Maxwell, a realty consultancy, found that apartment prices in Dubai fell 12% from Q1 2019 to Q1 2020. In contrast, the estate agent firm Chestertons saw the rental market perform better, with an average decrease of only 1.5% in apartment rental prices in Q1 2020.

In January 2023, it was reported that Dubai's property transactions hit a record high by the end of 2022, which surpassed the records of the year 2009. The hike was said to be partly a result of Dubai capitalizing on the Russia-Ukraine crisis. Waves of Russian nationals were said to have flooded Dubai to reside and invest their capital into the Emirates property market, safeguarding it from international sanctions. Hussain Sajwani, Chairman of DAMAC claimed that an estimated 15% of his customers constituted of Russian nationals.

Property prices in Dubai increased following the February 2022 Ukraine invasion, as wealthy Russian nationals started making high investments in the Emirati real estate. The EU Tax Observatory and Norway's Centre for Tax Research revealed that Russian Investment in Dubai's developing and in-development properties since 2022 was around $6.3 billion. Knight Frank claimed that Dubai property prices increased 124% since 2020. Real estate experts revealed that rising property prices forced British expatriates to search property somewhere else, including nearby places like Ras Al Khaimah.

In February 2025, it was asserted that Dubai could face issues as its popularity led to increasing tourist arrivals and growing population in the state. There was a record hike in real estate transactions and in bookings on the Emirates airline. Consequently, the congestion in Dubai worsened and property prices also went up. In 2024, rental prices increased by 20% in some key resident areas. Thomas Edelmann, managing director of the RoadSafetyUAE, said convincing and getting people to Dubai is easier than building the new intersection or highways.

=== Transport ===
The transport sector is one of the main drivers of economic growth in Dubai. The value of the transport and storage sector reached $12.5 billion in 2017, accounting for 11.2% of Dubai's economy.

In 2018, the sector was the second-largest contributor to the total GDP, contributing $48.8 billion to GDP - 12.3% of the total GDP, an increase of 2.1% from $47.7 billion in 2017.

=== Construction ===
Since 2000, Dubai's municipality has initiated construction phases in the city, predominantly in the Mina Seyahi area, located further from Jumeirah, towards Jebel Ali. This has come at a cost however. Dubai ( and UAE ) construction companies employ low-wage labourers from Asia for up to 12 hours a day, six or seven days a week. These workers often have their passports withheld and are threatened if they speak to media. During the 1990s and 2000s, many workers staged protests and those who were expats were deported.

In 2002 a change was made to the law allowing non-nationals of the UAE to own property (not land) in Dubai as fee simple, and 99-year leases are sold to people with ownership remaining with private companies. Property companies include Nakheel Properties, Emaar Properties and Ellington Properties. Rent rises were capped at 7% per annum up to 2007 under a directive from Mohammed bin Rashid Al Maktoum. Legislation in this area is still developing as the property market for foreigners is relatively new.

Property prices in Dubai have experienced a downfall since 2014. A difference of more than 25 percent has been noted. More than two-year ago Dubai's Creek Tower construction started, but no completion date is in sight yet. A cutback on the construction project has come into the scene since followed by realty developers postponing supplier payments. Consultancy firms like JLL cite the falling property prices to continue in 2019. Despite the economic slump and a relatively slower growth expectation, the estimated cost of Expo 2020 construction has reached AED38 billion ($10.3 billion).

=== Information and communication technology ===
The information and communications technology (ICT) sector accounted for 4.1% of Dubai's real GDP in 2018.

== Diamonds ==
Dubai is one of the world's largest diamond trading hubs alongside Antwerp. It handled in $35 billion worth of rough and polished diamonds in 2010, a surge from $3 million a decade earlier. In the first half of 2011, Dubai traded $25.3 billion, a 55% rise from the first half of 2010.

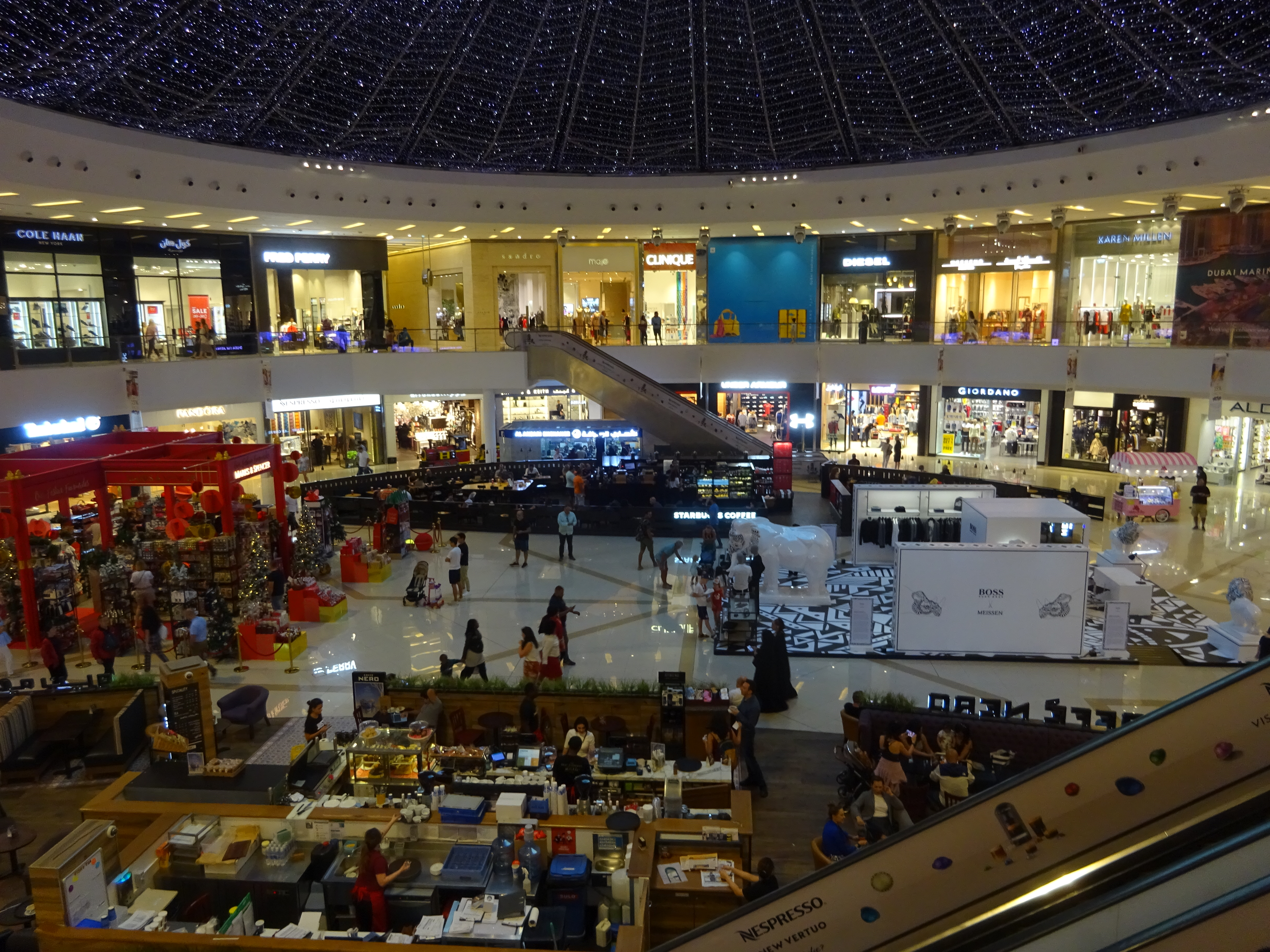
Dubai Marina Mall interior

Dubai has become the world's third largest diamond trading hub, with trade of rough and cut diamonds increasing since 2001. The emirate's diamond trade was virtually nonexistent at the beginning of the 2000s, but was worth nearly $35 billion in 2013 and 2014. The emirate has been able to leverage off its geographical position between major supplies of mined diamonds in Africa, to the main cutting centres in India and further east in China. There is also a perception of Dubai as a buying hub for consumers of diamonds jewellery, due to the large number of jewellers in the emirate and the tax-free business regime. The customs duties of 1% in 2011 contributed to the UAE's competing with traditional diamond centers. In 2018, the UAE rolled back the 5% value added tax (VAT) for wholesale diamond investors.

The diamond trading takes on an exchange managed by the Dubai Multi Commodities Centre, with many of the industry participants housed in office space in the Almas Tower in the JLT business cluster. Facilities there include Kimberley Process Certification offices and access to secure transportation agencies such as Brinks and Transguard, in addition to networking and meeting rooms. The DMCC houses over a thousand precious stone companies, both Emirati and foreign.

In September 2019, the Dubai Multi Commodities Center launched the world's largest trading floor, with 41 fully-secured tables and high-level security measures, at the Dubai Diamond Exchange (DDE) in the Almas Tower.

Right after the UAE-Israeli accord, Israeli diamond trader Zvi Shimshi launched a company in Dubai and 37 other Israeli contacted the DMCC to establish a presence in Dubai. Later in 2020, the DMCC launched a representative outpost in the Israel Diamond Exchange (IDE) to strengthen trading relations between the two markets and help Israeli businesses establish a presence in Dubai.

== Gold ==
Trade in gold grew during the 1940s due to Dubai's free trade policies that encouraged entrepreneurs from India and Iran to set up stores in the Dubai Gold Souk. Despite a general slump in the global gold market, Dubai's share of value of trade in gold and diamonds to its total non-oil direct trade increased from 18% in 2003, to 24% in 2004. In 2003, the value of trade in gold in Dubai was approximately Dh. 21 billion (US$5.8 billion), while trade in diamonds was approximately Dh. 25 billion (US$7 billion) in 2005. India is Dubai's largest buyer of gold, accounting for approximately 23% of the emirate's total gold trade in 2005. Switzerland was Dubai's largest supplier of gold ingots, wastes and scrap. Similarly, India accounted for approximately 68% of all diamond-related trade in Dubai; Belgium's share in Dubai's diamond trade was about 13% (2005).

In 2014, Dubai, accounted for about 25% of the world's annual gold trade, competing with Shanghai and London.

A June 2019 report by The Wall Street Journal reported, the government of Venezuelan President Nicolás Maduro sold 7.4 tons of gold ingots, worth $300 million through illicit channels to evade United States sanctions. In March 2019, the billions passed through African Gold Refinery (AGR) in Uganda, and were later exported to Dubai.

A Reuters investigation in 2019 revealed that billions of dollars' worth of gold was smuggled from Africa to Dubai. As per customs data retrieved by Reuters, the UAE imported $15.1 billion worth of gold from Africa in 2016, a surge from $1.3 billion in 2006. However, much of the exported gold was not recorded by African states.

The London Bullion Market Association (LMBA) threatened in a Nov. 2020 letter to ban countries with large gold markets, including the UAE, from entering the mainstream market if they fail to meet regulatory standards. While the letter did not specify a center, four people involved in drafting it said its main focus was the gold industry in Dubai.

The UAE became a major trade hub for Russian gold, following the international sanctions affecting Moscow's export routes. The largest handlers of Russian Gold exports to the UAE was a Dubai subsidiary of French Logistics, Temis Luxury Middle East. It imported 15.6 tonnes valued at $863 million midway of 24 February 2022 and 3 March 2023. Other largest handlers of gold shipped in the UAE in the year to 3 March 2023 included Shams Gold Trading with 8 tonnes, Privilege Group DMCC with 7.5 tonnes, Al Aseel Jewellery LLC with 5.3 tonnes and Paloma Precious DMC with 5.1 tonnes.

In 2026, most flights to and from Dubai were grounded due to geopolitical tensions in the Middle East, disrupting gold shipments. According to John Reid, chief market strategist at the World Gold Council, the disruption caused significant price swings in target markets, including India, where gold prices went from a $50 discount to the London price in a matter of days.

== Industry and manufacturing ==
Dubai is also home to some significant industrial ventures in energy production through DEWA, although this is primarily water and power production for Dubai. In the aluminum industry Emirates Global Aluminum produces 2.4 million tonnes of aluminum per year (~$3.8B USD in revenue). Investments were made in car manufacturing with Zarooq Motors; the start of UAE car industry. Production and sales were due to begin in 2016 but seem to have run into some trouble insofar as no cars have actually been manufactured. Dubai Ports is also an example of industrialization in Dubai.

== Foreign investment ==
In 2002, Dubai allowed foreigners to own real estate, and the global real estate consulting firm Jones Lang LaSalle named Dubai, along with Dublin and Las Vegas, its "World Winning City," a research program aimed at identifying the future's most attractive property markets.

Dubai's Department of Economic Development issued on June 3, 2021, guidelines stating that it was no longer compulsory for foreign investors to have Emirati partners or specify a quota ratio for them, which means that foreigners have been allowed full ownership of businesses in Dubai, in order to boost the economy after the COVID-19 recession. As soon as the decision was issued in June 2021, investors in Dubai took advantage of it.

== COVID-19 impact ==
Capital Economics, a UK-based consultancy firm, described Dubai as "the most vulnerable of the economies in the Middle East and North Africa to the economic damage from such (lockdown) measures" and speculated that the emirate's economy would "contract by at least 5-6%" in 2020 if the measures were still in force until the summer.

The COVID-19 pandemic led to several years of declining revenues for Dubai's most important sectors.

In April 2020, an estimate of 70% of Dubai's companies expected to go out of business by November 2020 due to the COVID-19 lockdowns, according to a survey by the Dubai Chamber of Commerce. Half of the restaurants and hotels included in the survey, as well as about 74% of travel and tourism companies and 30% of transport, storage, and communications companies, expected to go out of business within a month.

Expo 2020, which was expected to attract 25 million visitors to Dubai, stimulate the economy, and mark the start of 50 years of achievements, was postponed to Oct. 1, 2021 due to the pandemic and associated travel restrictions.

== See also ==
- Dubai World
- Economy of the United Arab Emirates
- Human rights in the United Arab Emirates
- The National Sukuk Program
