= Ali Rashid Lootah =

Banker

Ali Rashid Ahmad Lootah
- عَـلِي رَاشِـد أَحْـمَـد لُـوْتَـاه (in Arabic)
- Born: 1960 (age 65–66); Dubai, Trucial States (now the United Arab Emirates)
- Occupation: Vice Chairman of Mashreq bank

Ali Rashid Ahmad Lootah (Arabic: عَـلِي رَاشِـد أَحْـمَـد لُـوْتَـاه) is the vice chairman of Mashreq bank and former chairman of Nakheel, a property development company in Dubai, United Arab Emirates.

== Early life and career ==
Lootah was born in 1960 in Dubai, and pursued his education in civil engineering at Clarkson University in the United States. He established the UAE Society of Engineers, in which he became a member of founding board.

He started his career working in the UAE's Ministry of Public Works, where he was later appointed as Assistant Under-secretary of the Ministry. Lootah was appointed as chairman of Nakheel in 2012 replacing Sultan Ahmed bin Sulayem, and led the new strategy for the company also restarting some of its development projects. He retired as chairman in 2020.
