= Bahrain Centre for Studies and Research =

Defunct Bahrain-based think tank

The Bahrain Centre for Studies and Research (BCSR) was a think tank established in 1981, with the mission to serve the Bahraini community by conducting applied research, particularly of a contractual type, and to offer consultancies to leaders and decision makers in both the public and the private sectors. Since the inauguration of the Bahrain Centre for Studies and Research, the Centre has been determined to disseminate information on critical issues and problems which affect the growth, prosperity, and development of the Kingdom of Bahrain, using professional and scientific research methodologies. It was dissolved in 2010 after a royal decree was issued.

== Work ==
According to the goals of the Bahrain Centre for Studies and Research, the Centre undertakes strategic and scientific research, including surveys, observational studies, and experiments for local or external organizations, which are funded either by the Centre or from outside organizations on a contractual basis.

The BCSR has continuously sought to encourage, direct, and support the efforts of researchers in the scientific and technical fields. This has been achieved through several programmes, the most notable being the Crown Prince's Award for Scientific Research, which supports young researchers and offers both academic and financial recognition for work in the fields of the natural sciences, engineering, health sciences, and social sciences. The government of Bahrain has also fully supported and taken a keen interest in the work of the Centre.

== History ==
Crown Prince of Bahrain, Shaikh Salman was appointed Chairman of the Board of Trustees of the Bahrain Centre for Studies and Research (BCSR) in 1995.

The BCSR was dissolved in mid-2010 with a royal decree.

== See also ==
- Derasat
