= Palm Jebel Ali =

Artificial archipelago in Dubai, United Arab Emirates

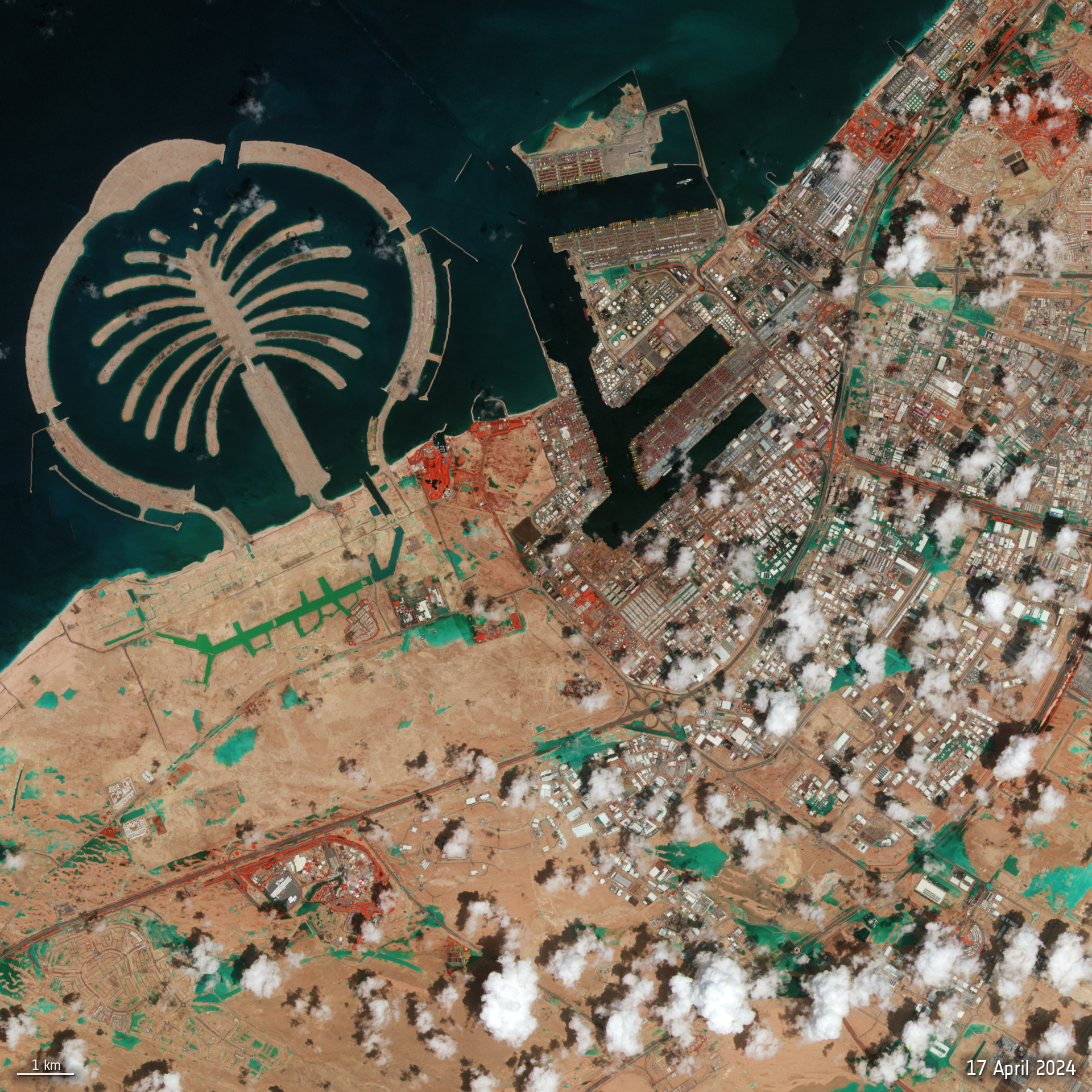
- The Palm Jebel Ali in April 2024

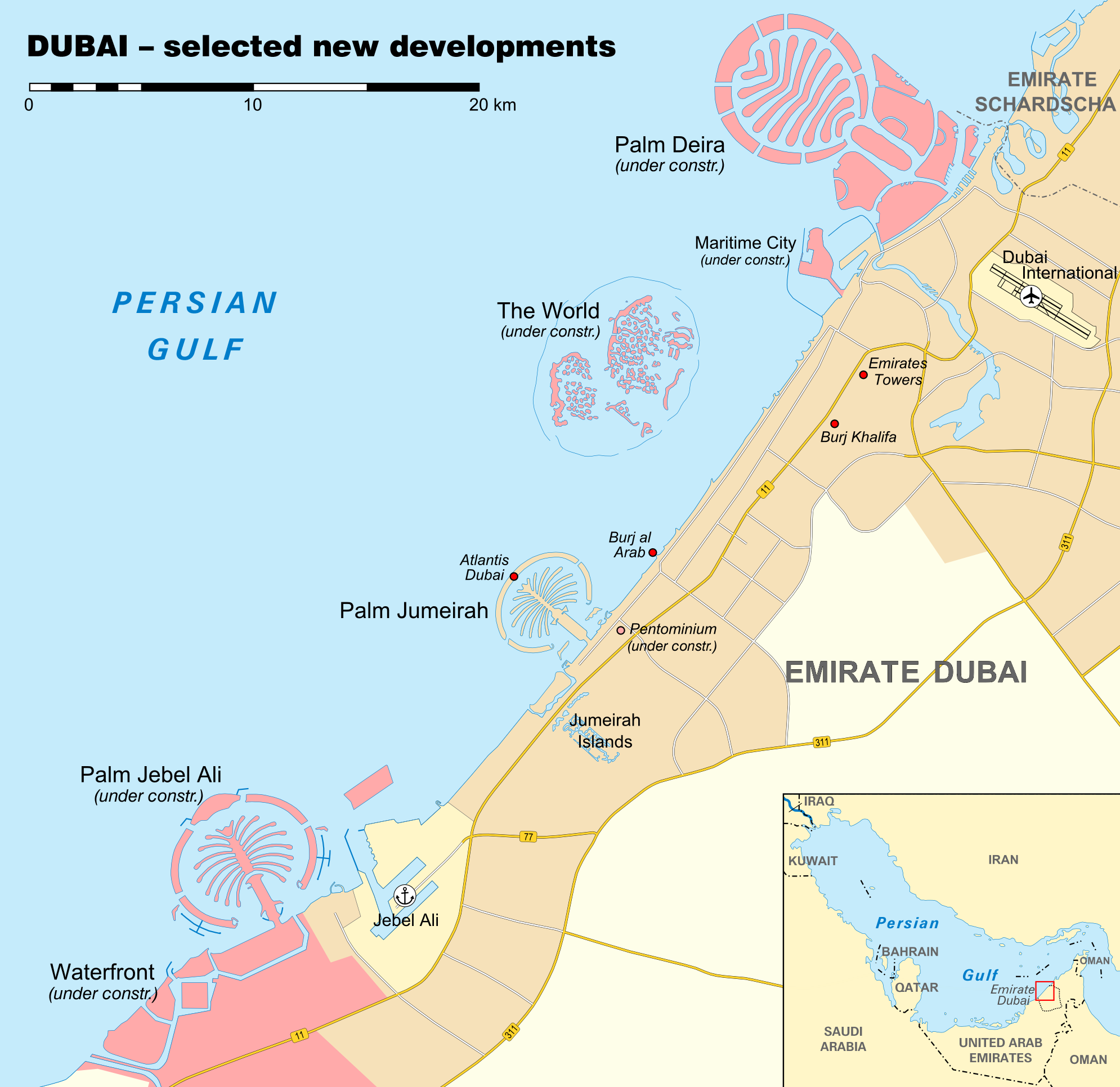
- New developments in Dubai with Palm Jebel Ali in the lower left corner

- Location within the Emirate of Dubai

Geography
- Location: Persian Gulf
- Coordinates: 25.010°N 54.985°E

Administration
- Dubai, United Arab Emirates

The Palm Jebel Ali (Arabic: نخلة جبل علي) is an artificial archipelago in Dubai, United Arab Emirates. It began construction in October 2002 and was originally planned to be completed by mid-2008 but has been on hold since. It was relaunched in 2024.

The project, which is 50 percent larger than Palm Jumeirah, is proposed to include six marinas, a water theme park, a 'Sea Village', homes built on stilts above the water, and boardwalks that circle the "fronds" of the "palm" and spelling out an Arabic poem by Sheikh Mohammed bin Rashid Al Maktoum reading; "Take wisdom from the wise, it takes a man of vision to write on water, not everyone who rides a horse is a jockey, great men rise to greater challenges". The poem boardwalks were however scrapped before a new design was issued and subsequently partially constructed. Due to the 2008 financial crisis, the construction was put on hold until its revival and resumption in 2024. The project is presently intended for completion in 2028.

== History ==
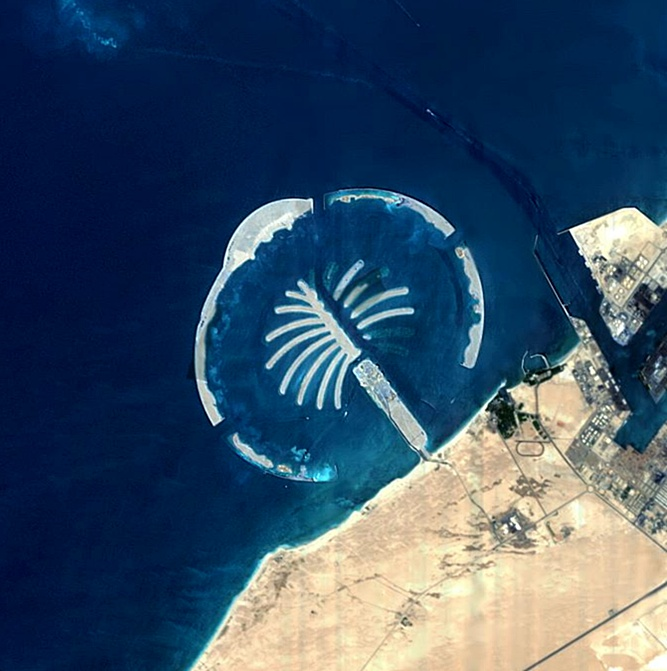
The Palm Jebel Ali under construction ca. August 2005

=== Initial work and stalling ===
The breakwater was completed in December 2006, and infrastructure work began in April 2007. After the 2008 financial crisis, work was halted and the developers, Nakheel, have confirmed no work would take place on the development in the near future.

Nakheel invited several architects to design one of the buildings for the Palm on a 300,000 m^{2} area. The winning design was a building by Royal Haskoning, who also worked on several other projects in Dubai.

In the first signs of a slowing Dubai property market, the prices of properties being sold on Palm Jebel Ali were reported to have fallen by 40% in the two months to November 2008, with the fall being attributed to the global financial meltdown.

In 2009, the Dubai Land Department investigated complaints about Nakheel stalling the Palm Jebel Ali project. Nakheel offered investors alternative homes in other projects but these were inferior properties. In March 2011, Nakheel offered refunds to property investors.

Palm Jebel Ali's developer planned to house more than 250,000 people on it.

In the original schedule, by 2021, the first phase of four theme parks would have opened on the Crescent. These planned parks, which together would have been called "World of Discovery," will be developed and operated by the Busch Entertainment Corporation. The parks include SeaWorld, Aquatica, Busch Gardens and Discovery Cove. The World of Discovery would have been located at the top of the Crescent, which would form into the shape of an orca (reminiscent of Shamu).

In November 2014, 74 owners of Palm Jebel Ali wrote to the Ruler of Dubai via the Ruler's Court regarding the stalled PJA project.

On 16 March 2015, Nakheel Chairman Mr. Ali Lootah confirmed that Nakheel remains committed to the project long term but asked "what can I do" for original investors.

In October 2018, Sanjay Manchanda, CEO of Nakheel, confirmed that there are no immediate plans to restart development of the project. In July 2021, it was announced that Nakheel planned to restart the project by considering plans involving building villas on the island.

In April 2022, reports began to circulate that Nakheel had petitioned the Dubai courts and secured a hearing in the absence of investors (as no notice was given) to secure a judgement to formally cancel the Palm Jebel Ali project, which was apparently granted on 19 May 2022. Consequently, 724 previous villa contracts were made null and void as per the judgement, with the aim to return only the original investment, without recognition of any secondary market transaction premium paid, or compensation as per the clause in the Nakheel property contract (Sales Purchase Agreement). Furthermore, no account was made of any opportunity cost including potential return on investment including even compound interest.

In September 2022, Nakheel announced a rebranding exercise. Soon after, it revealed its plans to relaunch Palm Jebel Ali.

Recently, it was revealed that Nakheel is nearing completion of $4.6 billion of debt restructuring to relaunch its landmark projects. Nakheel plans to build 1,700 villas and 6,000 apartments.

In November 2022, Bloomberg reported that Nakheel was attempting to refund original investors of up to nearly twenty years, their original investment back without compensation or interest. Nakheel has offered voluntary refunds in the past, which some investors have taken, whilst others have remained on the basis of the promise that the development will be built, albeit not in the short term.

=== Relaunch ===
On 31 May 2023, Dubai ruler Sheikh Mohammed bin Rashid Al Maktoum announced the relaunch of the project, confirming it would be up to twice the size of Palm Jumeirah adding additional coastline of approximately 110 km, including more than 80 hotels. A new masterplan of the project was launched, including the completion of 3 incomplete fronds, beach profiling, construction of road bridges, luxury hotels and apartments, and a new Gateway Tower complex at the top of the breakwater. The project aims to house 35,000 families, featuring luxury mansions and apartments. A third of its public facilities will be powered by renewable energy. A group of 30 owners lodged an appeal before a Dubai court to void the previous judgment that rules the project canceled and ordered the developer to pay investors only the amount collected from the original buyers.

The project subsequently restarted construction in 2024 and the first properties are planned to be delivered in Q1 2027. In 2024, two separate groups of investors from countries with an International investment treaty with Dubai (the United Arab Emirates) including Germany, Morocco & United Kingdom issued trigger letters to commence international arbitration in a claim against the state-owned Dubai Holdings (including Nakheel).

== Gallery ==
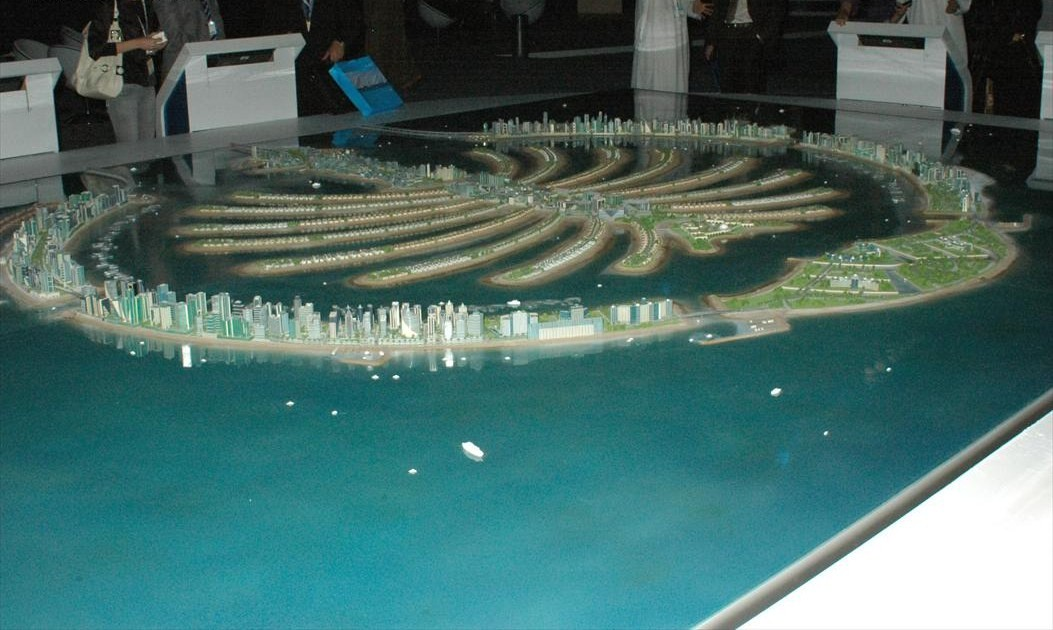
the second design of the Palm Jebel Ali Model on 20 January 2008

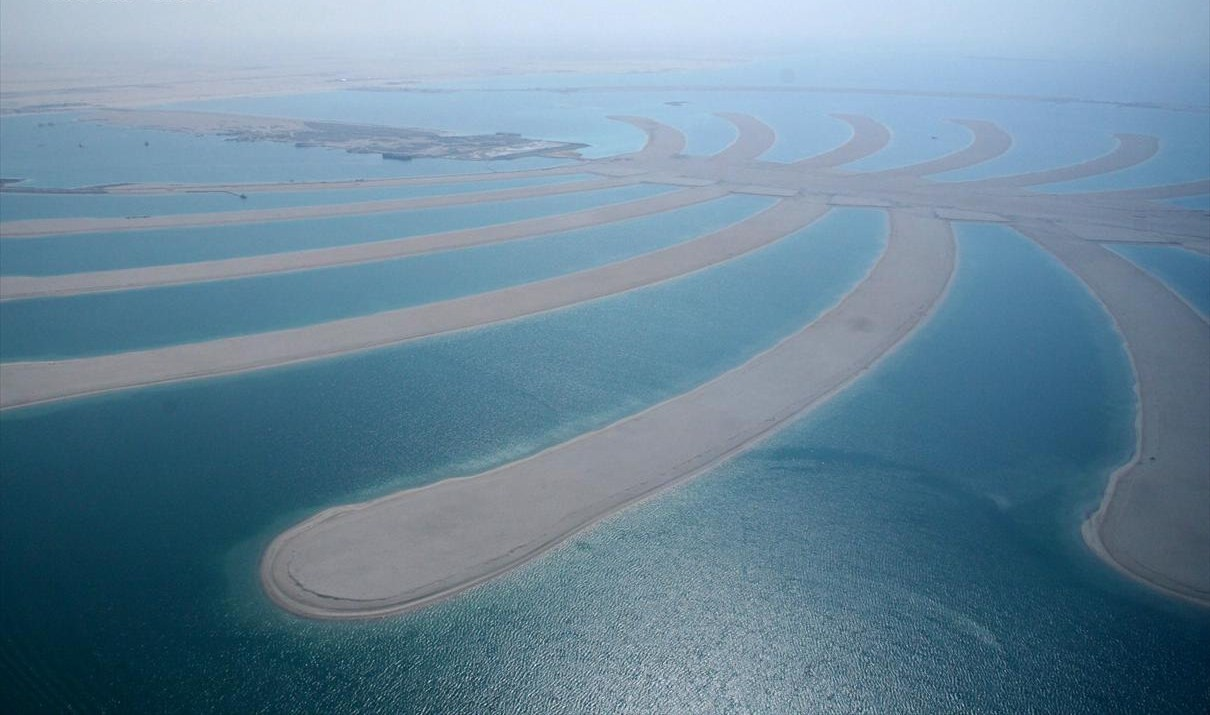
Palm Jebel Ali on 18 October 2007

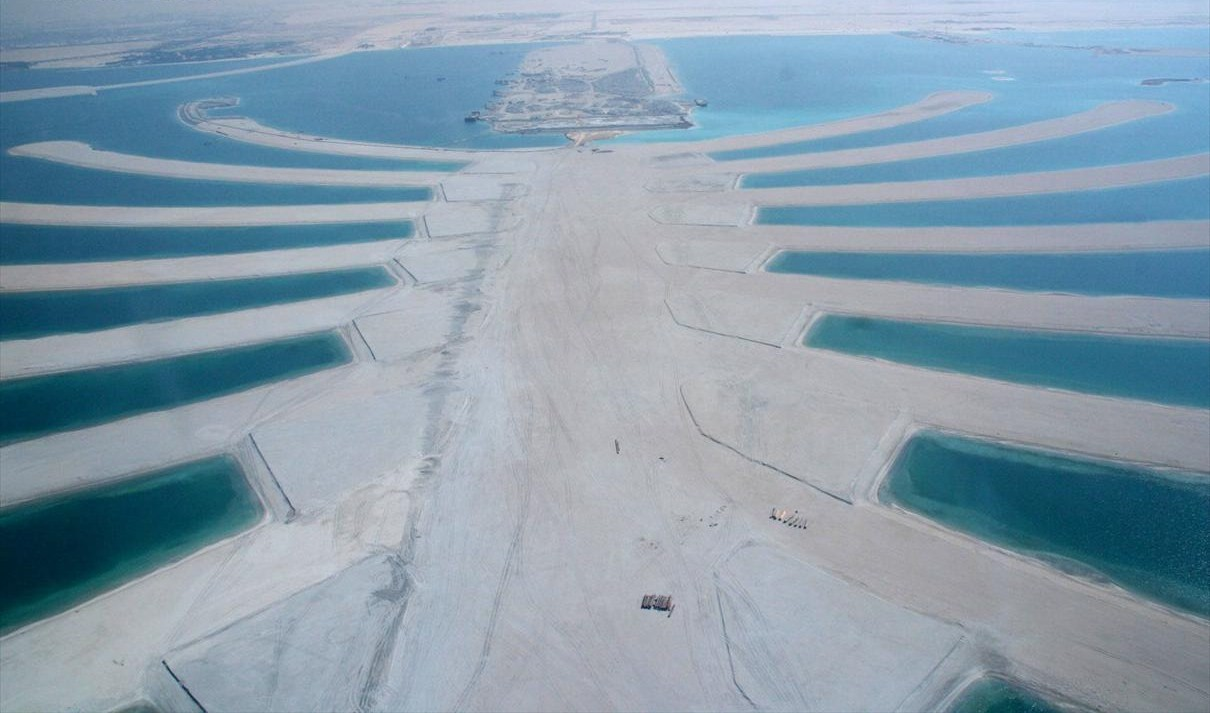
Palm Jebel Ali on 18 October 2007

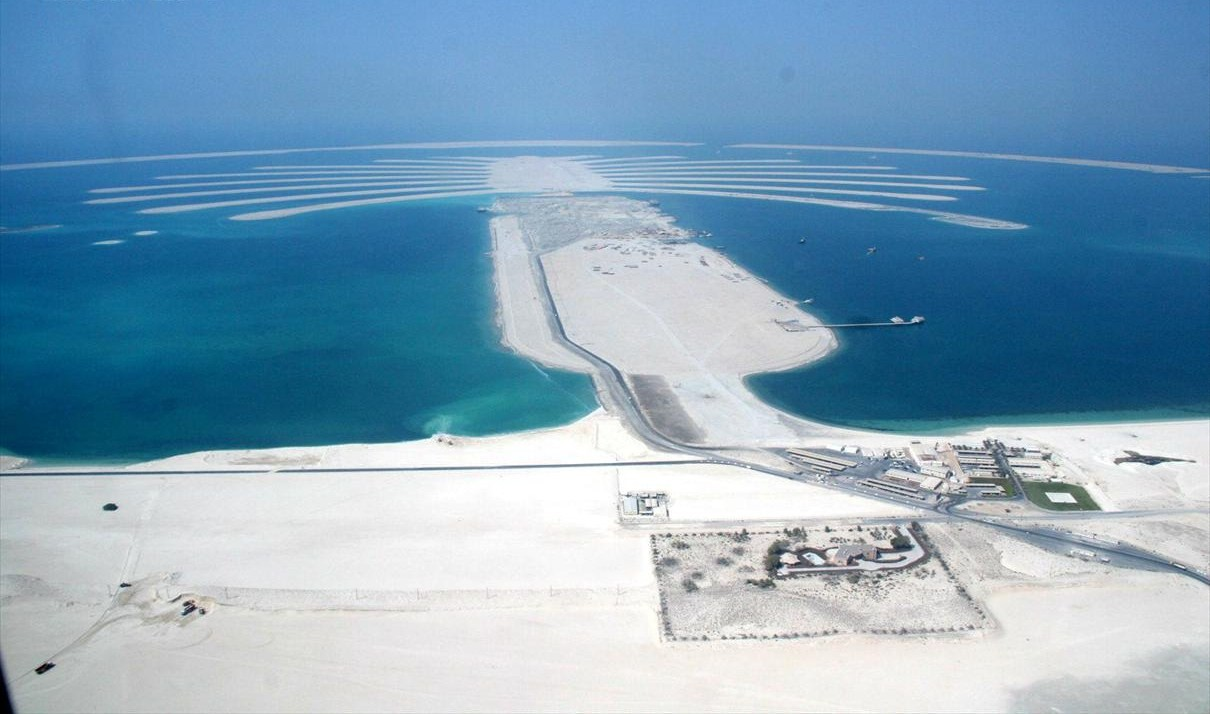
Palm Jebel Ali on 18 October 2007

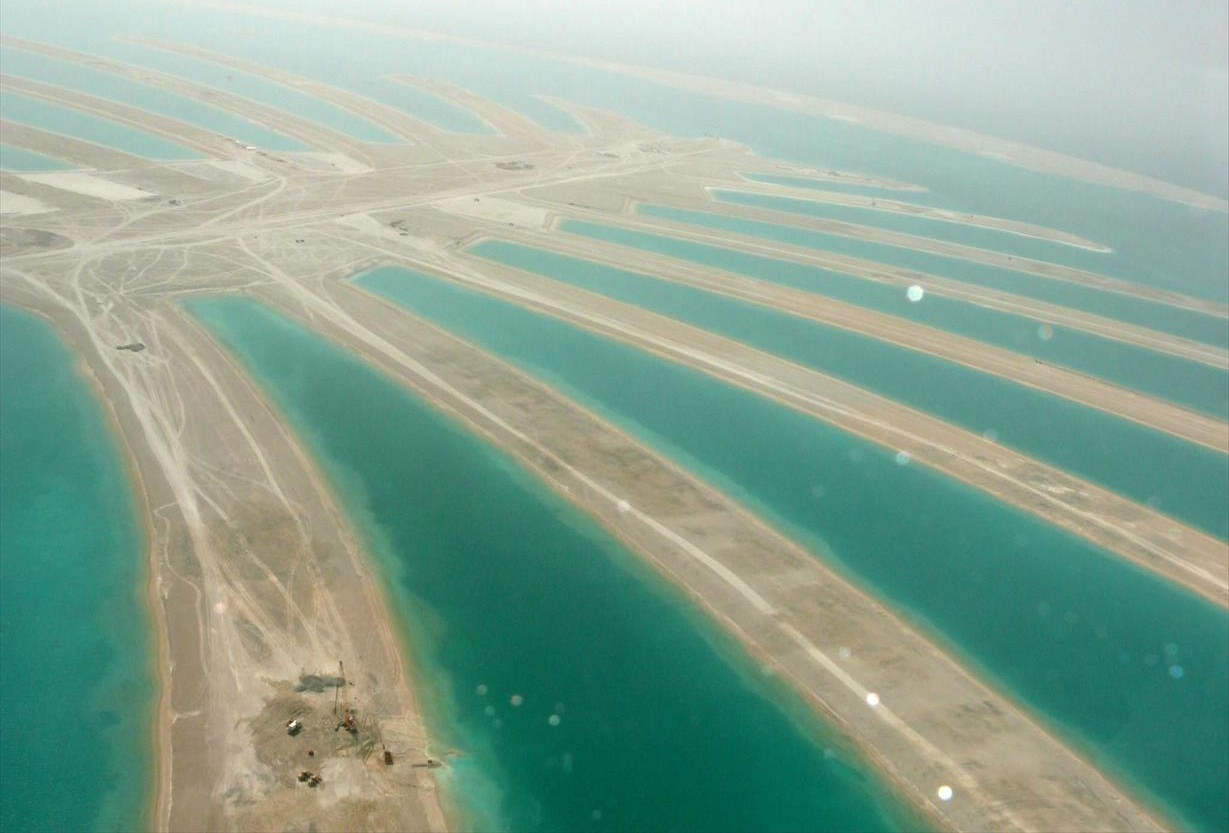
Palm Jebel Ali on 8 May 2008

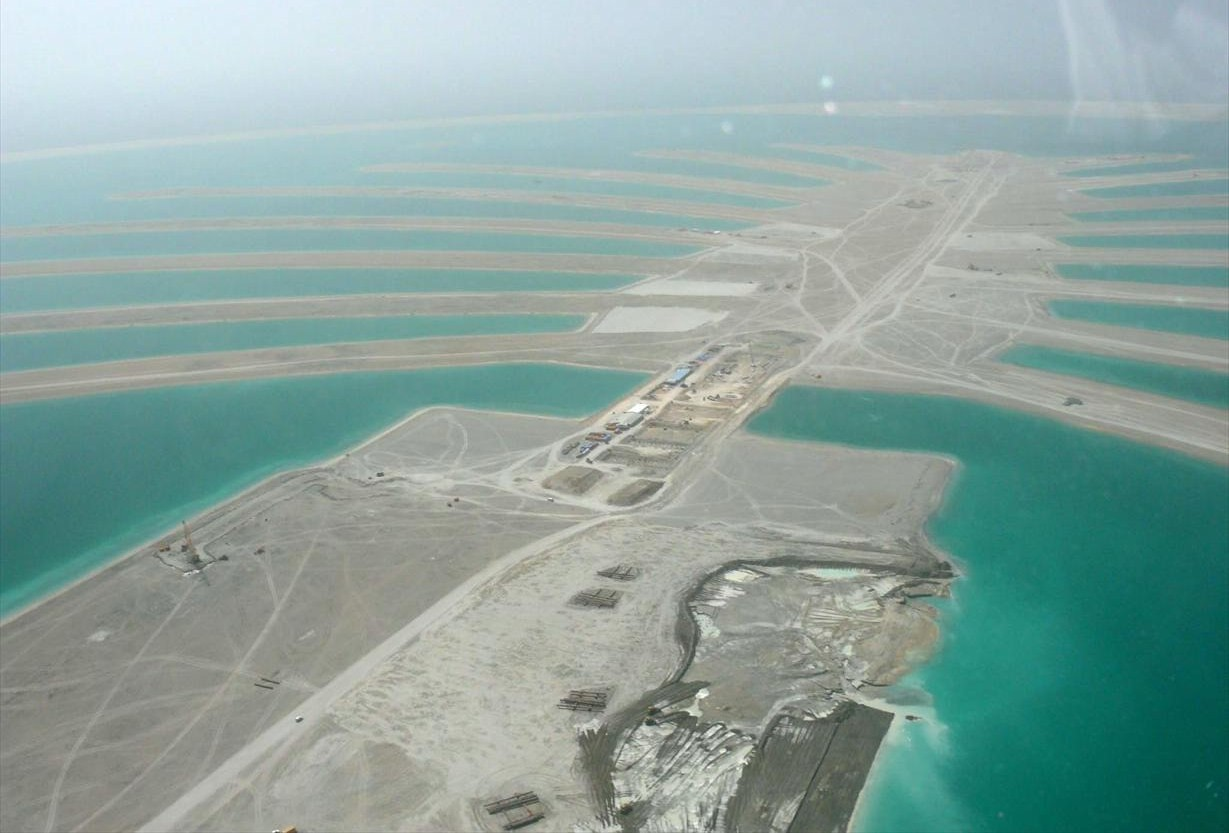
Palm Jebel Ali on 8 May 2008

== See also ==
- Palm Islands
- The World, another artificial island project in Dubai.
- Dubai Waterfront
- Nakheel, the real estate developer of Palm Islands
- Tourism in Dubai
