= Doha Institute for Graduate Studies =

- معهد الدوحة للدراسات العليا

Location
- Doha; Qatar; 25°23′11.8″N 51°29′0.9″E

Information
- Type: Private
- Established: 2014; 12 years ago
- Language: Arabic
- Accreditation: Arab Center for Research and Policy Studies
- Website: Doha Institute for Graduate Studies

The Doha Institute for Graduate Studies (Arabic: معهد الدوحة للدراسات العليا) is a higher education institute in Doha, Qatar. Its first student enrollment was in the autumn/fall semester of the 2015/2016 academic year. The Doha Institute is intended as a graduate studies academy; students enrolled in its programs are eligible to receive master's degrees in a variety of fields related to the social sciences and humanities.

== Establishment ==
The Doha Institute was born of an initiative of the Arab Center for Research and Policy Studies, also located in Doha, which announced the formal launch of the Doha Institute in 2014. According to its own website, the Doha Institute will be divided into a number of administrative teaching units: a School of Social Sciences and Humanities; a School of Public Administration and Development Economics; and a Center for Conflict and Humanitarian Studies. In addition, the Doha Institute includes the Doha Dictionary of the Arabic Language, an initiative aimed at creating an accessible dictionary of Arabic root words which also traces the etymology of Arabic root words over two thousand years of history.

One of the institute's stated aims is to enhance and encourage the use of the Arabic language as a medium for academic instruction.

== See also ==
- List of universities and colleges in Qatar
- Qatar University
