= Asia Security Conference =

Two annual conference series

There are two annual conferences that go by the title of the Asia Security Conference. The oldest of these is held by the Indian think tank Institute for Defence Studies and Analyses (IDSA) in New Delhi, India. This conference brings together globally renowned scholars who interact with senior members of IDSA as well as senior members of the Indian Government. The 12th Annual Asian Security Conference was hosted by IDSA from 11 to 13 February. These conferences are by invitation only. At the 2010 Conference, the Indian Defence Minister and Indian Defence Secretary both played key roles. The conference annually explores issues of security affecting South Asia. Attendees for the 2010 Conference included senior academics from the United States, Pakistan, Russia, Iran, India, and the United Kingdom, among others. Notable names included G. John Ikenberry, and Aaron Friedburg from Princeton, Summit Ganguly from the Indiana University, John Geis from Air University.

There is a more recently developed 'Asia Security Conference,' which is an annual event organised by International Institute for Strategic Studies (IISS). The conference is also known as Shangri-La Dialogue. The first conference was held on 2002 and the success prompted the organisers to make it an annual event. The 8th edition of the conference was held from 29 to 31 May 2009 in Singapore.

== 2009 Conference ==
Australia, Bangladesh, Brunei, Cambodia, Canada, China, France, Germany, India, Indonesia, Japan, Laos, Malaysia, Mongolia, Myanmar, New Zealand, Pakistan, Philippines, Republic of Korea, Russia, Singapore, Sri Lanka, Thailand, Timor Leste, the United Kingdom, the United States, Vietnam are the countries that participated in the 2009 conference.

The main focus of the meet was shipping security, fighting terrorism and the North Korea's nuclear ambition. The conference was of a particular importance in the backdrop of North Korea's nuclear as well as missile test. There was also criticism that the meeting was organised for achieving peace in the region but the participating countries were more interested in private meetings to discuss weapons purchases.

== 2005 Conference ==
The 2005 talks was held in Singapore and focused issues including the U.S.-led war on terrorism, the proliferation of weapons of mass destruction, and the emergent roles for India and China in Asian regional security.

18 countries represented at the ministerial-level: Korea, Australia, Cambodia, Canada, India, Indonesia, Japan, Malaysia, Mongolia, Myanmar, New Zealand, Pakistan, the Philippines, Singapore, Thailand, Timor-Leste, the United Kingdom and the United States.

Through this Conference, it was found that the United States might have done something wrong in "dealing with this whole terrorism mess."
