= Nakheel Properties =

Property development company in Dubai

- Type: Government owned
- Industry: Real estate
- Founded: 2003; 23 years ago
- Headquarters: Dubai, United Arab Emirates
- Key people: Amit Kaushal (CEO); Ahmed bin Saeed Al Maktoum (chair)
- Services: Property development
- Revenue: ▲AED 5.67 billion (2017)
- Owner: Government of Dubai
- Number of employees: 1,500
- Subsidiaries: Jumeirah Village, Nakheel Marinas, International City, Canal District, Jumeirah Islands, Warsan, Dragon Mart Complex, The Gardens, Nakheel Asset Management, Palm Deira, Azure Residences, Veneto Residence, Badrah, Golden Mile
- Website: www.nakheel.com

Nakheel Properties (Arabic: نَـخٍـيْـل, romanized: nakhīl, lit. 'palm tree') is a real estate development company based in Dubai, United Arab Emirates. The formal name of the company is Nakheel PJSC (private joint stock company) and it was a subsidiary of Dubai World and a private state-owned enterprise.

Nakheel was central to Dubai's debt crisis in 2009–2010. The company has been reported to be the second-largest property developer in Dubai after Emaar Properties. On 16 March 2024, Nakheel, along with Meydan, was merged into Dubai Holding and ceased to be a separate entity.

== History ==
Previous logo of Nakheel Properties

Nakheel was founded in 2003 as a subsidiary of state-owned Dubai World and a private state-owned enterprise. The company was involved with a sukuk, which raised legal issues in 2009. This sukuk has been the subject of academic study. It was reported to be the largest ever sukuk.

In 2010, Sultan Ahmed bin Sulayem was replaced as chairman of Dubai World. The same year, the company started payments for creditors. In 2011, the company undertook 59 billion dirham ($16 billion) of debt restructuring.

On 6 July 2011, Dubai World’s board of directors announced that Nakheel's legal ownership would be transferred to the Government of Dubai upon completion of the company's financial restructuring. In 2012, the company was the subject of a study by the American University of Sharjah on corporate governance along with Tamweel.

In 2013, the ruler of Dubai, Sheikh Mohammed bin Rashid Al Maktoum, approved US$898 million of funding for the company and ordered work to start on two major projects on the Palm Jumeirah.

In 2017, the company achieved $1 billion net profit in nine months, delivering 1,200 units with 23,000 under construction in Dubai. The same year (2017), Nakheel awarded a $410 million contract for the Palm Gateway to the company Shapoorji Pallonji Mideast to construct a three-tower residential, retail, and beach club complex.

In January 2020, Mohammed Ibrahim Al Shaibani took over as chairman from Ali Rashid Lootah. In May 2020, it was reported that some employees' salaries were cut between 30 and 50 percent for senior staff due to the COVID-19 pandemic. In November 2020, Naaman Atallah was appointed as the company's chief executive officer.

In September 2022, Nakheel rebranded, unveiled a new logo. The same month, the company also made announcements regarding previously frozen projects, including Palm Deira, which the company restarted in August 2022, and which was renamed as Deira Islands, then changed to Dubai Islands.

After a $4.6 billion debt restructuring deal, Nakheel relaunched the Palm Jebel Ali project, having stalled since 2008, building 1,700 villas and 6,000 apartments on the man-made islands, having previously contacted existing investors offering to buy back their contracts for plots and properties.

== 2008 financial crisis ==
Nakheel prospered until the 2008 financial crisis led to a decline in Dubai's real estate market, putting Dubai World at risk of bankruptcy in November 2009. After write-downs of real estate values and lower sales, Nakheel had made a loss of 13.4bn dirham ($3.65 billion) in the first half of 2009, and despite a cash bail-out in May, the company sought to delay the December repayment of a $3.5 billion bond. This happened because Dubai's government refused to bail out Nakheel's parent company, due to which it requested a stay on debt payments, and consequently, it was downgraded to junk status. However, on 14 December 2009, in the nick of time, neighbouring Abu Dhabi invested $10bn in Dubai, warding off Nakheel's debt default, and in March 2010, the government of Dubai rescued Dubai World, providing $9.5bn to help ensure Nakheel bond-holders would be paid on time and in full. The move was seen as key to resolving Dubai's debt crisis: "Fix Nakheel, and you go a long way to fixing Dubai real estate; fix real estate, and you fix Dubai," said Aidan Burkitt, hired from Deloitte to be Dubai World's chief restructuring officer.

== Portfolio ==
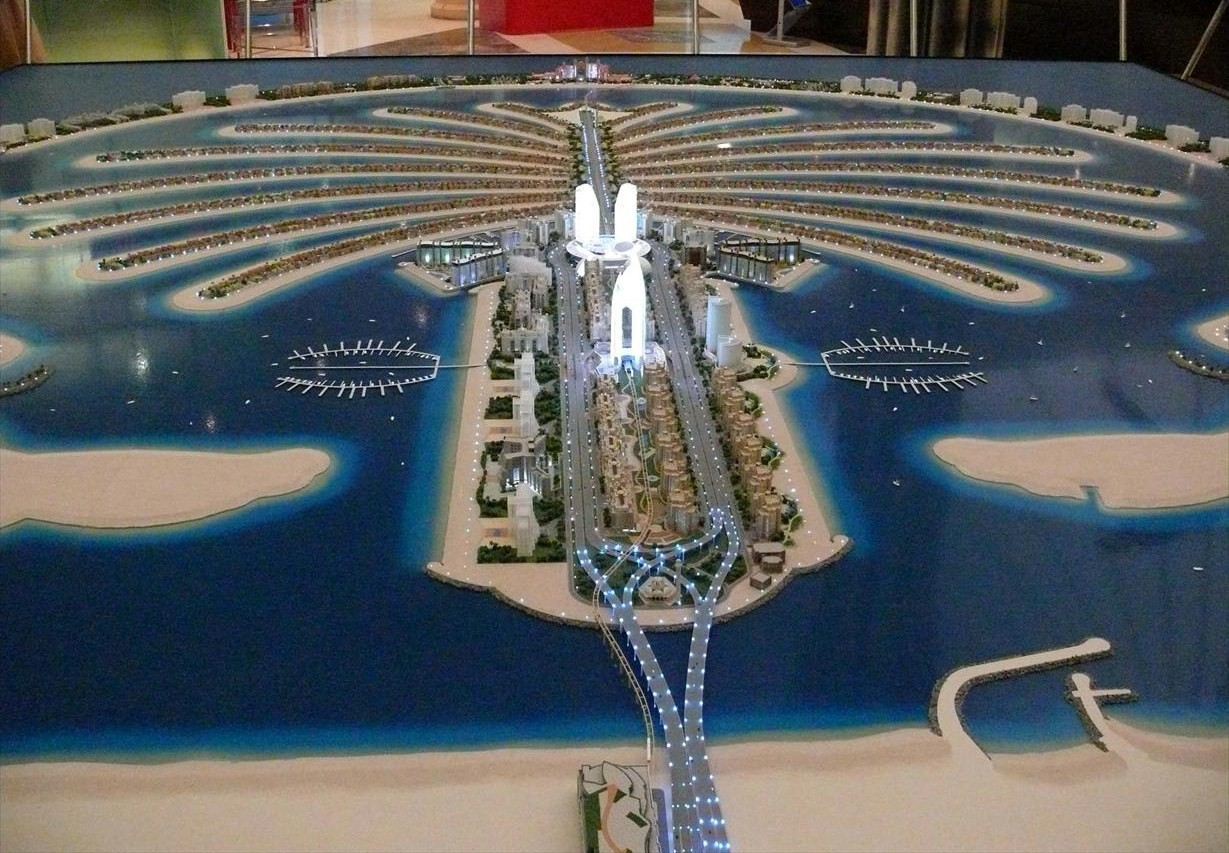
A model of Palm Jumeirah at the Nakheel Sales Centre in 2008

Nakheel Properties has projects in Dubai across the residential, retail, hospitality and leisure sectors. Property development projects include:

=== Dubai South ===
- Palm Jebel Ali
- Palm Springs
- Jebel Ali Village
- Al Furjan
- Tilal Al Furjan
- Murooj Al Furjan
- Discovery Gardens
- Ibn Battuta Mall
- The Gardens
- Garden Apartments
- Garden View Villas
- Garden View Apartments
- Emaar South

=== Jumeirah ===
- Jumeirah Heights
- Jumeirah Islands
- Jumeirah Park
- Jumeirah Lake Towers
- Lake Shore Towers
- Jumeirah Village
- Marina Residences
- Palm Jumeirah
- Palm Tower
- Palm Beach Towers
- Palm Jumeirah Mall
- Dubai Harbour and Emaar Beachfront

=== Dubai North ===
- Nad Al Sheba Villas
- Warsan Village
- The World Islands
- Al Jaddaf Culture Village
- Dragon City
- Dragon Mart
- Dubai International City
- Dubai Islands
- Dubai Maritime City
- Naya 3 District One

Retail project developments include Ibn Battuta Mall, Dragon Mart 1 and 2, Golden Mile Galleria, Nakheel Mall, The Pointe, Deira Mall, Deira Islands Night Souk, Warsan Souk, Al Khail Avenue, The Circle Mall and Nad Al Sheba Mall, as well as extensions to Dragon Mart and Ibn Battuta Mall. Nakheel has also developed properties outside Dubai, in Montenegro for example.

== See also ==
- List of largest corporate profits and losses
- Emaar_Properties
- DAMAC_Properties
- Meraas
