= Tourism in Dubai =

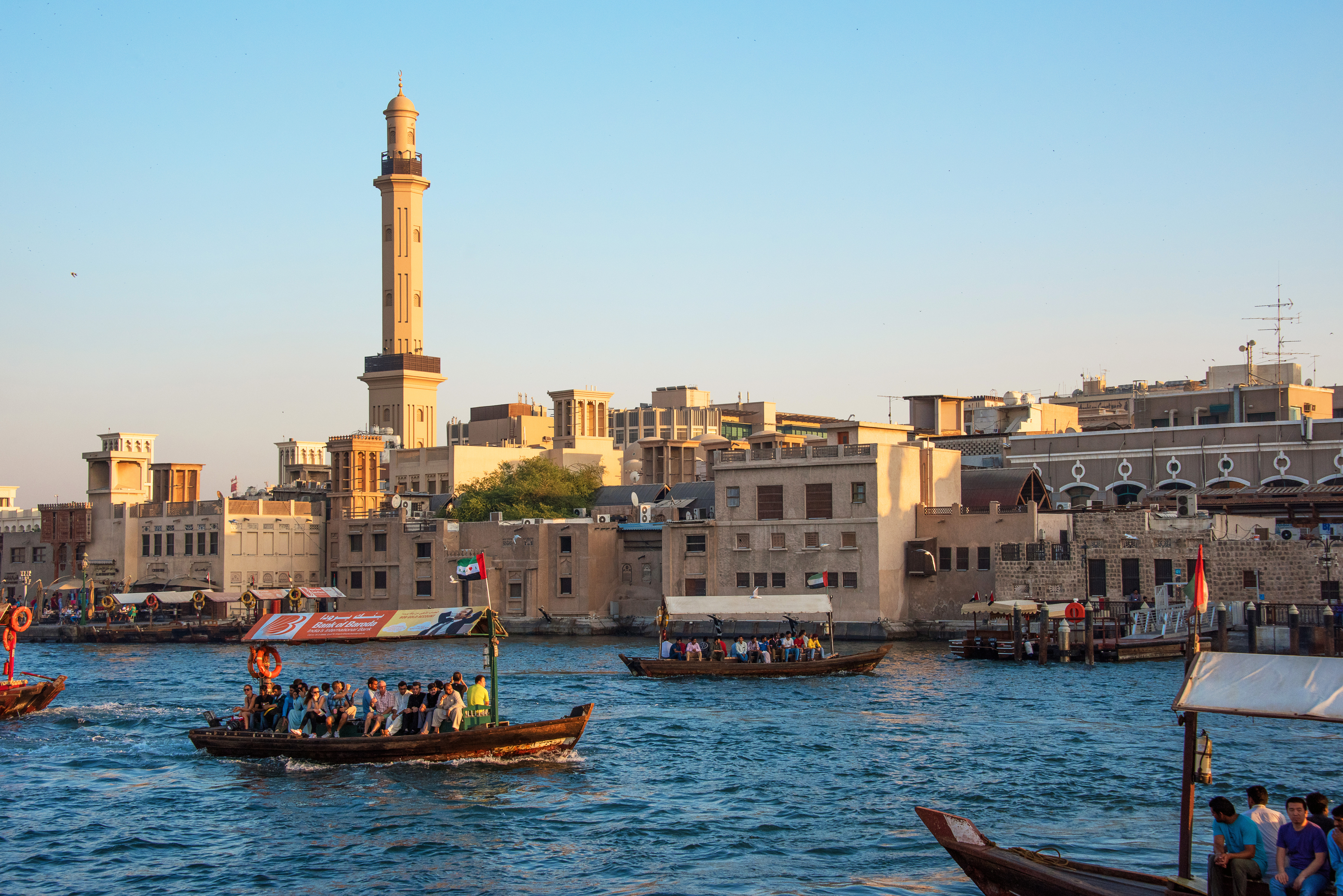
The Al Fahidi Historical Neighbourhood, also called Al Bastakiya, is Dubai's historic district and major tourist destination.

Tourism in Dubai is a major part of the economy of Dubai. Dubai is one of the top 10 most visited cities in the world recording more than 19 million international visitors in 2025 according to Euromonitor International. Dubai hosts 800 hotels with around 150,000 rooms.

== History ==
The discovery of oil in 1966 kick-started the development of present Dubai, however Sheikh Hamad bin Maktoum (ruler from 1958 till 1990) realised one day Dubai would run out of oil and started building an economy that would outlast it. A quote commonly attributed to Sheikh Rashid reflected his concern that Dubai's oil, which was discovered in 1966 and which began production in 1969, would run out within a few generations. Sheikh Rashid stated "My grandfather rode a camel, my father rode a camel, I drive a Mercedes, my son drives a Land Rover, his son will drive a Land Rover, but his son will ride a camel". Sheikh Rashid realized early he needed to diversify the emirate of Dubai's economy by building on the city's trading history and therefore he set out to establish Dubai as the region's trade and service hub. By 1979, he was successful in establishing the Jebel Ali Port, which became the logical shipping centre for the entire United Arab Emirates and the world's largest man-made port. He also upgraded Dubai International Airport and built the Dubai World Trade Centre, which was then the tallest building in the Middle East. By the end of the 1970s, the stage was set for the diversification of Dubai's economy away from oil and into other areas such as tourism.

In 1989 the Dubai Commerce and Tourism Promotion Board was established, to promote Dubai as a luxury destination for the up-tier market and influential business sectors. In January 1997, it was replaced with the Department of Tourism and Commerce Marketing (DTCM).

In May 2013, the government of Dubai launched the Dubai Tourism Strategy 2020, with the key objective to attract 20 million visitors a year by 2020 and making Dubai a first choice destination for international leisure travellers as well as business travellers. In 2018, the strategy was expanded by setting new goals of attracting 21-23 million visitors in 2022 and 23-25 million visitors by 2025. The key objectives from 2013 and 2018 were not met due to the COVID-19 pandemic.

In July 2019, Dubai's Jumeirah Group LLC fired 500 people due to a decline in tourism. In the second quarter of 2019, hospitality sector has had the worst quarter since 2009.

The need to maintain its tourism industry has hampered Dubai's response to the COVID-19 pandemic. Along with COVID-19 Dubai's tourism sector has also been hurt by a greater international awareness of the status of human rights in the emirate and in particular the treatment of Princess Latifa bint Mohammed Al Maktoum.

In November 2022, Sheikh Mohammed bin Rashid announced a national tourism strategy until 2031. The goal of the strategy is to attract Dh 100 billion in additional tourism investments (so that the tourism sector's contribution will be Dh450bn of Dubai's GDP in 2031) and receive 40 million hotel guests in 2031. The strategy includes 25 initiatives and policies to support the development of the tourism sector in the country.

In April 2025, the Dubai Department of Economy and Tourism introduced a new programme offering media training to students for promotion of tourism in the UAE. Applicants are provided with flights, luxury apartment and three months of income, along with certification from Dubai College of Tourism for posting about traveling experiences in Dubai on social media. According to Middle East Eye, this program aims to whitewash its human rights violations and war crime accusations in Sudan.

== Visitors and visitor spending ==
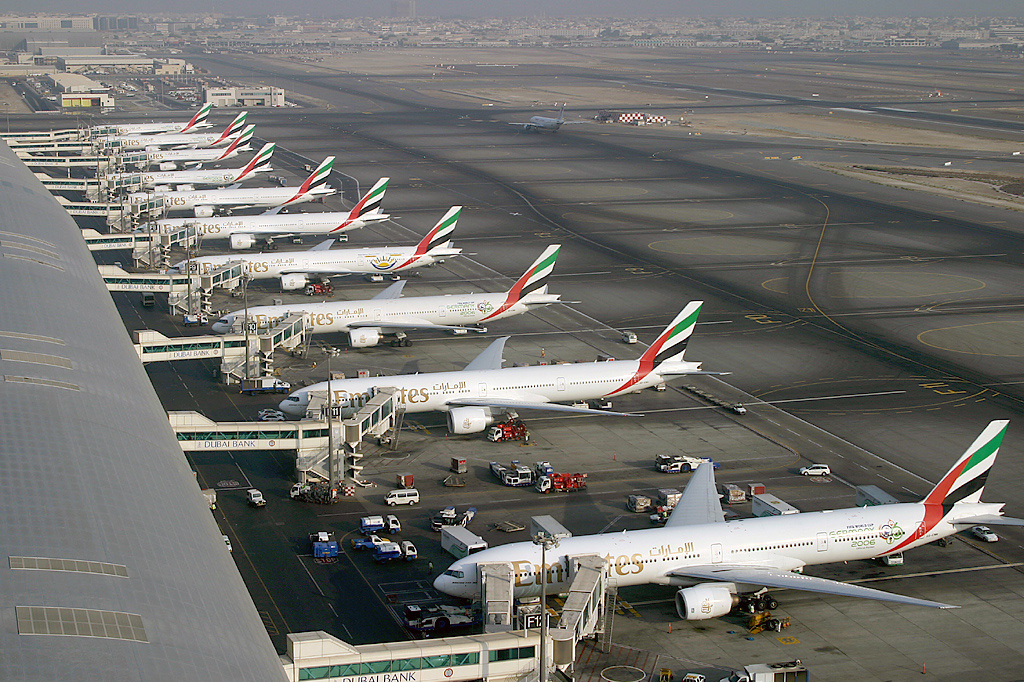
Dubai International Airport (DXB)

Dubai has experienced sustained growth in international tourism since the early 1980s, evolving from a regional trading centre into one of the world's most visited cities. In the early 2000s, travellers from the Gulf Cooperation Council (GCC) states accounted for more than one-third of total arrivals, while South Asia, Europe and Africa were significant secondary source markets. Tourism receipts surpassed US$1 billion in 2003, highlighting the early expansion of the sector.

By the late 2010s, Dubai had become a global leader both in visitor numbers and visitor spending. According to Mastercard's Global Destination Cities Index 2018, Dubai ranked first worldwide in international visitor spending for the fourth consecutive year, generating US$30.82 billion, a 3.8% increase compared to 2017. Average daily spending by international tourists in 2018 reached US$553, among the highest of any major global destination.

In 2019, Dubai welcomed 16.73 million international visitors, a 5.09% increase over 2018, maintaining its position as one of the world's fastest-growing major tourism markets. The global COVID-19 pandemic significantly impacted international mobility the following year, and Dubai's visitor numbers dropped to 5.51 million in 2020.

A rapid recovery began in 2021, supported by extensive reopening measures and marketing initiatives. In 2022, Dubai recorded 14.36 million international overnight visitors, returning to 86% of pre-pandemic levels, while total visitor spending exceeded US$29 billion, once again placing the city among the highest-earning destinations globally.

In 2023, the emirate achieved a new annual record with 17.15 million international visitors, driven by increased air capacity, major events, and continued investment in leisure infrastructure.

This growth continued into 2024 and 2025, culminating in another unprecedented year in 2025. According to the Dubai Department of Economy and Tourism (DET), the emirate hosted 19.59 million international overnight visitors in 2025, a 5% increase compared with 2024 — the highest annual total ever recorded. Visitor spending also reached new highs, with increases recorded across leisure, business and premium segments. December 2025 marked one of the strongest months in nearly two decades, with hotel occupancy exceeding 84% and room rates reaching multi-year highs.

In 2026, the Dubai Department of Economy and Tourism launched 'A Dubai Invite', a program encouraging UAE residents to invite family and friends from overseas to visit Dubai. The initiative was open to UAE residents and citizens aged 18 and over, with nominated visitors eligible to receive benefits including savings on hotel stays, dining experiences and attraction tickets of up to AED 3,000. The program received more than 90,000 nominations from residents across almost 200 nationalities, substantially exceeding the level of participation anticipated by the program. Nominations were subsequently closed, with visitors whose nominations had been submitted remaining eligible to arrive in Dubai until 31 October 2026.

Dubai's top source markets in the mid-2020s included Western Europe, the GCC, South Asia, and CIS/Eastern Europe, supported by expanded global connectivity through Dubai International Airport and Al Maktoum International Airport.

Year	Total international visitors	Increase/decrease
1982	374,400	—N/a
1990	632,903	▲69.04%
1991	716,642	▲13.23%
1992	944,350	▲31.77%
1993	1,088,000	▲15.21%
1994	1,239,000	▲13.88%
1995	1,601,000	▲29.22%
1996	1,768,000	▲10.43%
1997	1,792,000	▲1.36%
1998	2,184,000	▲21.88%
1999	2,481,000	▲13.60%
2000	3,027,000	▲22.01%
2001	3,626,625	▲19.81%
2002	4,756,280	▲31.15%
2003	4,980,228	▲4.71%
2004	5,420,000	▲8.83%
2005	6,160,003	▲13.65%
2006	6,441,670	▲4.57%
2007	6,951,798	▲7.12%
2008	6,996,449	▲0.64%
2009	7,580,000	▲8.34%
2010	8,410,000	▲10.95%
2011	9,910,000	▲17.84%
2012	10,950,000	▲10.49%
2013	12,900,000	▲17.81%
2014	13,200,000	▲2.33%
2015	14,200,000	▲7.58%
2016	14,870,000	▲4.72%
2017	15,790,000	▲6.19%
2018	15,920,000	▲0.82%
2019	16,730,000	▲5.09%
2020	5,510,000 (Note: Due to the COVID-19 pandemic.)	▼ -67.07%
2021	7,280,000 (Note: Due to the COVID-19 pandemic.)	▲32.12%
2022	14,360,000	▲97.25%
2023	17,150,000	▲19.4%
2024	18,720,000	▲9.2%
2025	19,590,000	▲5%

== Accommodation ==
Burj Al Arab hotel

In the mid-2020s, Dubai's hospitality and accommodation sector expanded significantly alongside sustained growth in tourism. According to the Dubai Department of Economy and Tourism (DET), Dubai recorded a third consecutive year of record international visitation in 2025, welcoming 19.59 million overnight international visitors, an increase of 5 % compared to 2024. This marked the highest annual visitor count in the city's history and highlighted robust global demand for Dubai's accommodation offerings.

By the end of 2025, the emirate's hotel inventory comprised 154,264 rooms across 827 establishments, positioning Dubai among the world's largest hospitality markets in terms of total available rooms. This inventory expansion was supported by a wave of new openings across different segments, including Ciel Dubai Marina (noted as one of the world's tallest hotels), Jumeirah Marsa Al Arab, Mandarin Oriental Downtown, Cheval Maison at Expo City, and Vida Dubai Mall. The average hotel occupancy rate in 2025 reached 80.7 %, up from 78.2 % in 2024, reflecting strong and sustained demand across leisure and business travel segments. Occupied room nights increased to 44.85 million, with the average length of stay at approximately 3.7 nights.

The sector's performance peaked in December 2025, when hotels experienced record occupancy and revenue metrics. In that month alone, occupancy rates reached above 84 % and the Average Daily Rate exceeded AED 1,000 in some segments, contributing to one of the strongest year-end hotel performances in nearly two decades. Suited to Dubai's broader tourism strategy, the hotel market's growth has been supported by major global marketing campaigns, expansive infrastructure investment, and strategic public-private partnerships, which have diversified demand sources and reinforced year-round visitation. Source market analysis shows Western Europe as the largest contributor of international visitors, with significant contributions from the GCC, South Asia, CIS/Eastern Europe, and other regions.

Hotel inventory numbers 2015-2026
	2015	2016	2017	2018	2019	2020	2021	2022	2023	2024	2025	2026
Total 5 star hotels	91	96	103	113	128	134	143	151	157	168	173	163
Total 5 star hotel rooms	31,551	33,122	35,853	38,543	43,133	44,067	47,035	49,585	51,809	54,083	56,048	51,846
Total 4 star hotels	106	112	122	146	158	161	181	189	194	198	195	194
Total 4 star hotel rooms	21,208	22,990	25,289	29,908	33,120	34,905	40,377	42,505	43,283	43,846	43,500	43,464
Total 1-3 star hotels	264	267	260	260	258	225	243	270	274	277	280	263
Total 1-3 star hotel rooms	19,714	21,767	21,591	22,634	24,491	21,732	25,384	28,512	28,789	29,718	29,523	28,331
Total hotel apartments (deluxe/superior)	66	66	65	68	68	74	80	82	85	81	81	82
Total deluxe/superior rooms	9,641	9,519	9,786	10,522	10,520	11,845	12,606	13,113	13,842	13,955	13,888	13,591
Total hotel apartments (standard)	150	140	131	129	129	117	108	112	111	108	98	93
Total standard rooms	16,219	15,447	14,930	14,360	14,856	14,398	12,548	12,781	12,568	12,414	11,305	11,564
Total establishments	677	681	681	716	741	711	755	804	821	832	827	794
Total available rooms	98,333	102,845	107,431	115,967	126,120	126,947	137,950	146,496	150,291	154,016	154,264	148,796
Average occupancy	77%	78%	78%	76%	75%	54%	67%	73%	77%	78%	81%	60%

== Cultural sensitivity ==
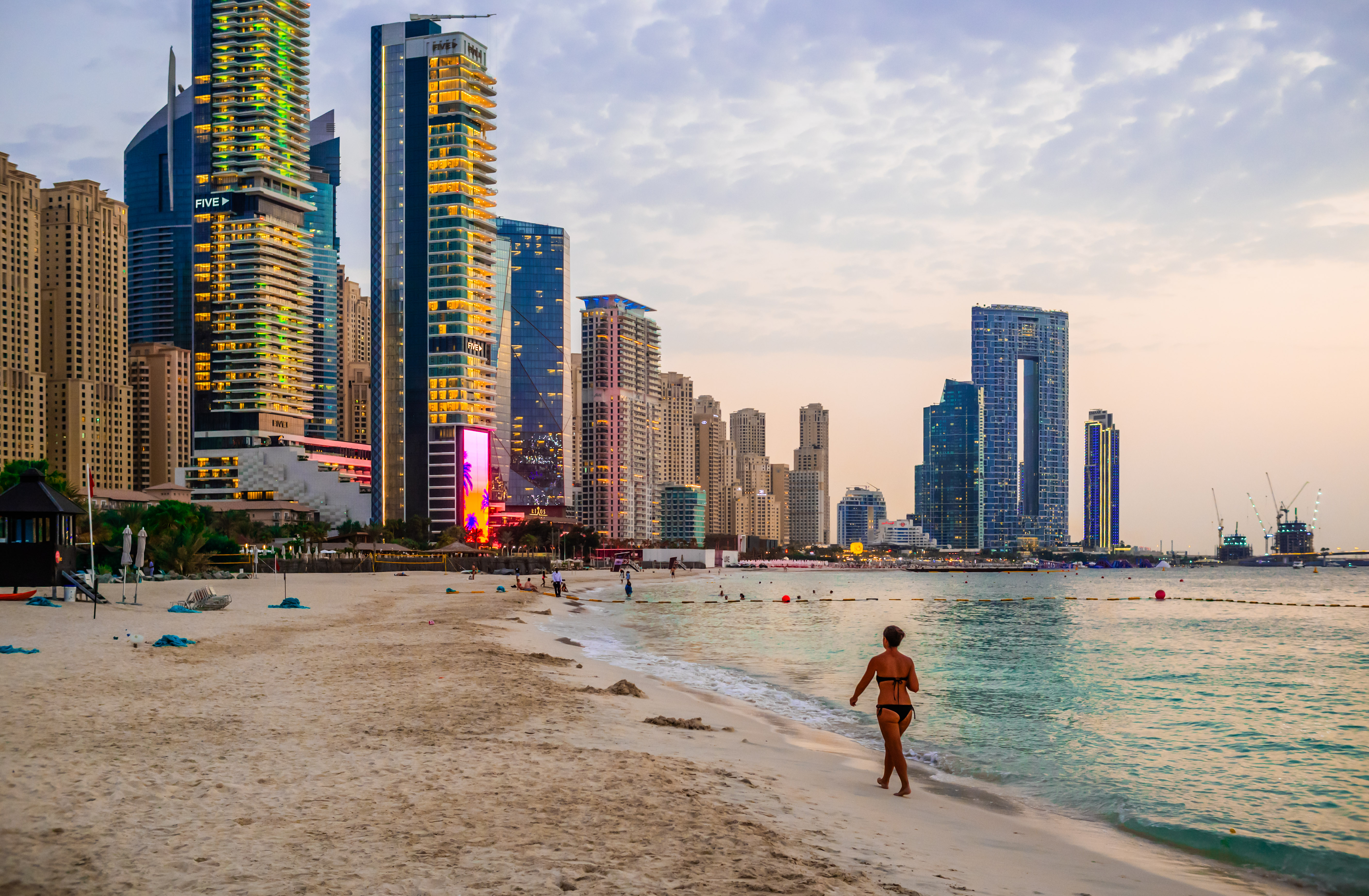
A beachgoer at Dubai Marina, illustrating the contrast between resort-area permissiveness and the city's broader expectations of public modesty.

Dubai has a diverse population comprising residents and visitors of different nationalities and faiths. During Ramadan, non-Muslim residents and visitors are not required to fast, and eating and drinking during daylight hours are permitted. Restaurants and other dining establishments generally continue to operate, although some may adjust their hours or services during the month. Dubai does not have a general dress code for visitors, although more conservative attire is customary and may be expected at religious, cultural or government sites.

Dubai's legal framework includes modesty provisions that influence dress expectations in public in certain places. Although beaches, hotel pools and resort areas permit Western swimwear, malls, government buildings and traditional neighbourhoods maintain guidelines requiring clothing that covers shoulders and knees. Security personnel may request individuals to adjust attire if it is considered overly revealing, although enforcement varies across districts.

Public displays of affection (especially intimate gestures) are discouraged, with excessive displays potentially subject to penalties under public decency laws. Alcohol is allowed in licensed venues such as hotel bars and restaurants, but public consumption or intoxication remains an offence under UAE federal legislation. Similarly, photographing individuals without their consent, or taking images of certain government or military buildings, may constitute a violation of privacy or national-security regulations.

Homosexuality remains criminalized under federal law, including for tourists. Enforcement in Dubai is generally complaint-based, and there is little evidence of proactive policing of private consensual conduct, but legal risk nonetheless exists for behaviour that becomes visible in public or is reported to authorities.

=== Cultural frameworks and their relevance to tourism ===
Academic cultural frameworks have occasionally been used by scholars to contextualize the interaction between international tourists and Emirati society. Although these models are not employed officially by Dubai's authorities, they provide a structured way to interpret the behavioural expectations visitors encounter.

==== Hofstede's cultural dimensions ====
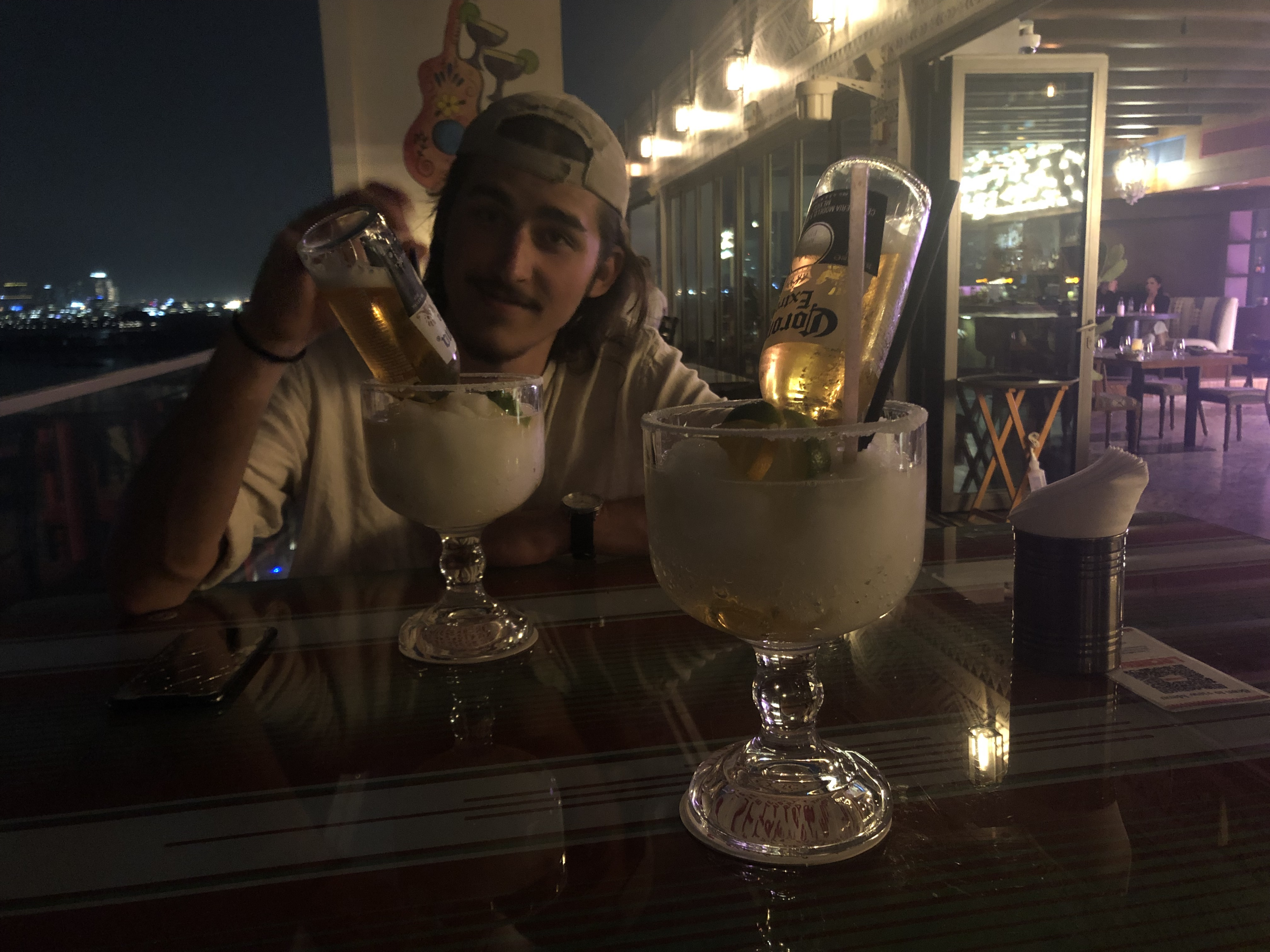
A tourist drinking in a licensed setting on Palm Jumeirah. Dubai's high uncertainty avoidance contributes to a preference for clearly articulated guidelines regarding alcohol consumption and acceptable public behaviour, ensuring that leisure environments remain predictable and culturally coherent for both residents and visitors.

The Hofstede's cultural dimensions theory dataset characterizes the UAE as a society marked by high Power Distance, strong Collectivism, and relatively high Uncertainty Avoidance.

Dubai's high Power Distance reflects a cultural orientation in which hierarchy, authority and formal structures are treated with deference. For tourists, this is visible in strict compliance expectations within official settings—airports, government buildings, and interactions with police or security personnel often operate with formality and low tolerance for confrontation.

The low-individualism, or collectivist, orientation emphasizes community cohesion, shared reputation, and public order. Tourists who raise their voices, engage in confrontational disputes, or display behaviour perceived as disruptive may attract social disapproval or intervention. What, in many Western societies, is considered merely "impolite" can in Dubai be perceived as disrespectful or destabilizing to communal harmony.

High Uncertainty Avoidance is reflected in Dubai's preference for clear rules governing public conduct (from alcohol regulations to dress expectations) and helps explain the relative strictness of laws around public indecency, photography, and public intoxication. In a tourism context, this means that ambiguity is rarely tolerated in public behaviour; rules are explicit, and deviations can be formally addressed.

==== Hall's high-context communication ====
The framework of Edward T. Hall classifies Gulf societies, including Dubai's, as high-context cultures, where communication often relies on indirect signalling, shared social understanding, and implicit norms rather than direct confrontation.

For tourists, this manifests in social interactions that prioritise politeness, a measured tone, and non-verbal cues. Direct criticism, abrupt refusals, or openly challenging staff in hotels, malls or public institutions may be interpreted as hostility rather than assertiveness. Much of Dubai's hospitality industry, particularly among long-term expatriate staff, navigates between high-context Emirati norms and low-context expectations of international visitors, which occasionally leads to mismatched interpretations of politeness or service expectations.

==== Lewis Model ====
Within the Lewis Model (Linear-Active, Multi-Active and Re-Active), the UAE is characterised as occupying a space between the multi-active and reactive cultural clusters.

This classification captures two aspects relevant to tourism. First, multi-active traits such as personal warmth, hospitality and relational communication are deeply embedded in Emirati and wider Gulf social etiquette. This is reflected in Dubai's service culture, which places emphasis on courtesy, hosting and interpersonal rapport. Second, reactive traits, particularly the value placed on emotional self-control, respectfulness and non-confrontation, are core to interactions in public settings. Tourists unfamiliar with these dynamics may misinterpret calmness or formality as aloofness, or conversely may inadvertently appear aggressive when speaking in a direct, emphatic or highly assertive manner considered normal in low-context societies.

=== Balancing modernity and tradition ===
Dubai's cultural landscape is shaped by an unusual interplay between global cosmopolitanism and deeply rooted social norms. As a tourism hub, the city has developed a dual system in which resort zones, beach clubs, international hotels and entertainment districts operate with relaxed behavioural expectations, while public civic spaces, traditional neighbourhoods, and government environments adhere to more conservative interpretations of public order.

Academic tourism studies frequently cite Dubai's model as one of "controlled openness," whereby the city maintains broad international accessibility while preserving specific cultural constraints to support social cohesion. This duality allows Dubai to appeal simultaneously to conservative regional travellers and to global leisure and business tourists, while maintaining a legal and cultural environment consistent with the norms of the UAE.

== Attractions ==
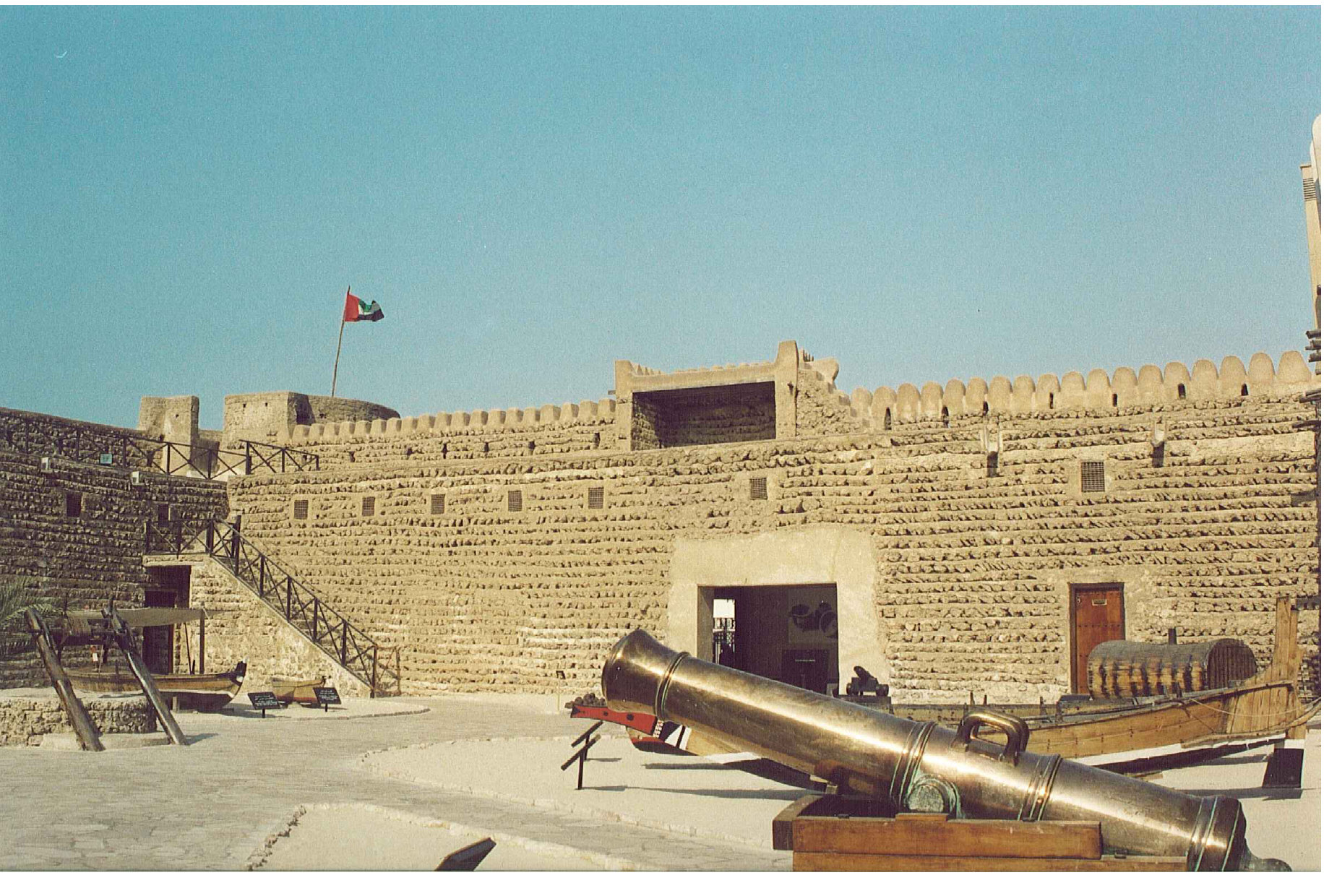
Al Fahidi Fort

Aspects of Dubai's old culture, while occasionally overshadowed by the boom in economic development, can be found by visiting places around the creek, which splits Dubai into two halves, Bur Dubai and Deira. The buildings lining the Bur Dubai side of the Creek provide the main flavor of the old city. Heritage Village is one of the few remaining parts of historical Dubai, containing preserved buildings. The adjoining Diving Village offers exhibits on pearl diving and fishing. The Diving Village forms part of an ambitious plan to turn the entire "Shindagha" area into a cultural city, recreating life in Dubai as it was in days gone by.

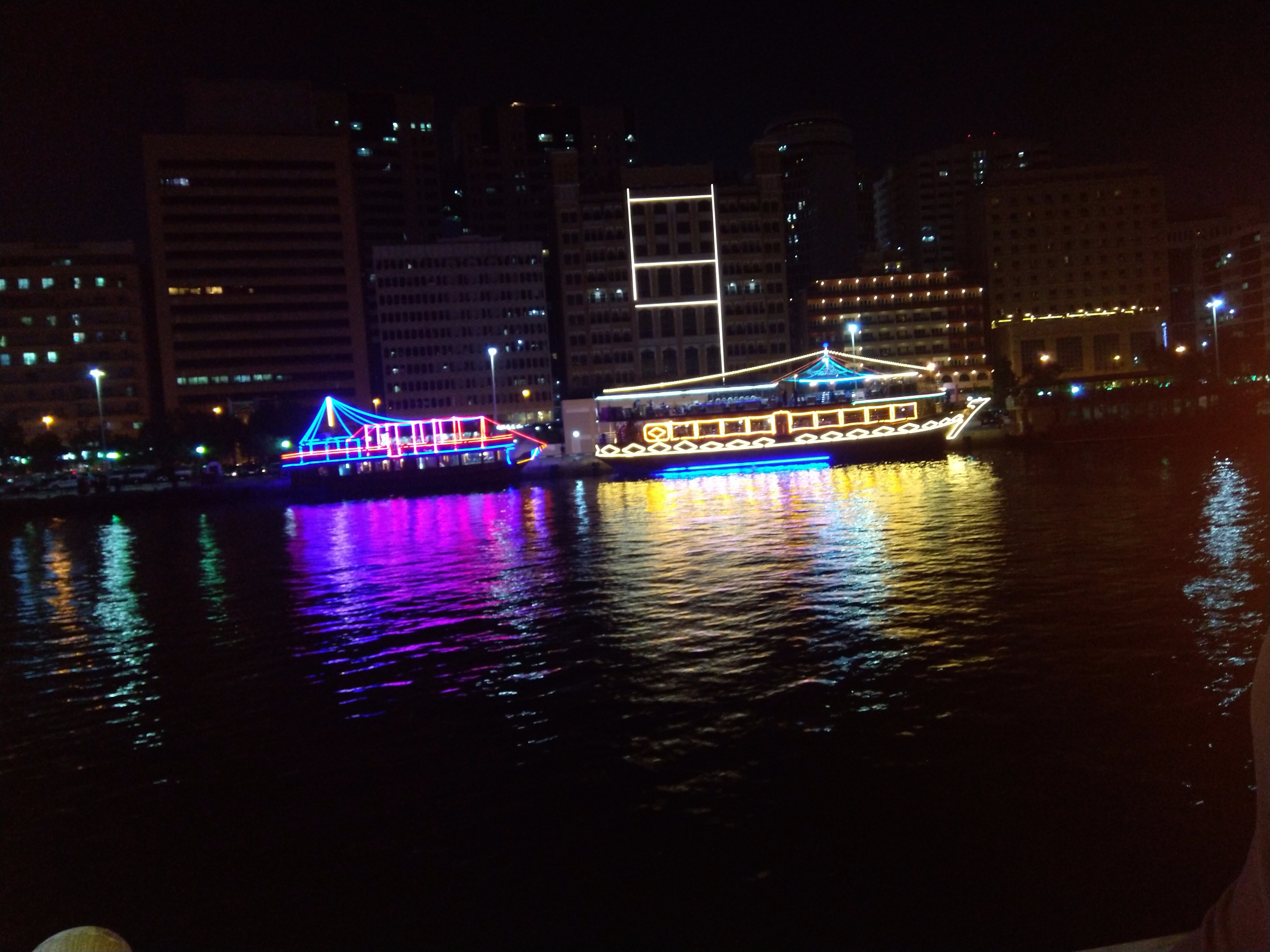
Boats on Dubai water line night view

Other attractions include the Sheikh Saeed Al Maktoum House; the Dubai Museum in the restored Al Fahidi Fort, which was erected around 1799; and the Heritage Village of Hatta, situated 115 kilometers southeast of Dubai City in the heart of the rocky Hatta Mountains. The history of the village can be traced back 2000 – 3000 years. It consists of 30 buildings, each differing in size, interior layout and building materials used. Great care was taken to use the same materials as those used when originally built during the renovation such as mud, hay, sandalwood and palm fronds. The Sharia Mosque is an old mosque built in the early 19th century using the same building materials and consists of a large prayer hall, a court and courtyard, minaret and other utility rooms. Other museums include the Al Ahmadiya School.

=== Culture ===
Main article: Culture of the United Arab Emirates

Dubai has several cultural and archeological sites that are frequently visited by tourists. Archeological sites include Jumeirah Archeological Site, while museums and cultural sites include the Dubai Museum, housed in the historic Al Fahidi Fort, Jameel Arts Centre, Etihad Museum, Al Shindagha Museum, and Alserkal Avenue.

=== Shopping ===
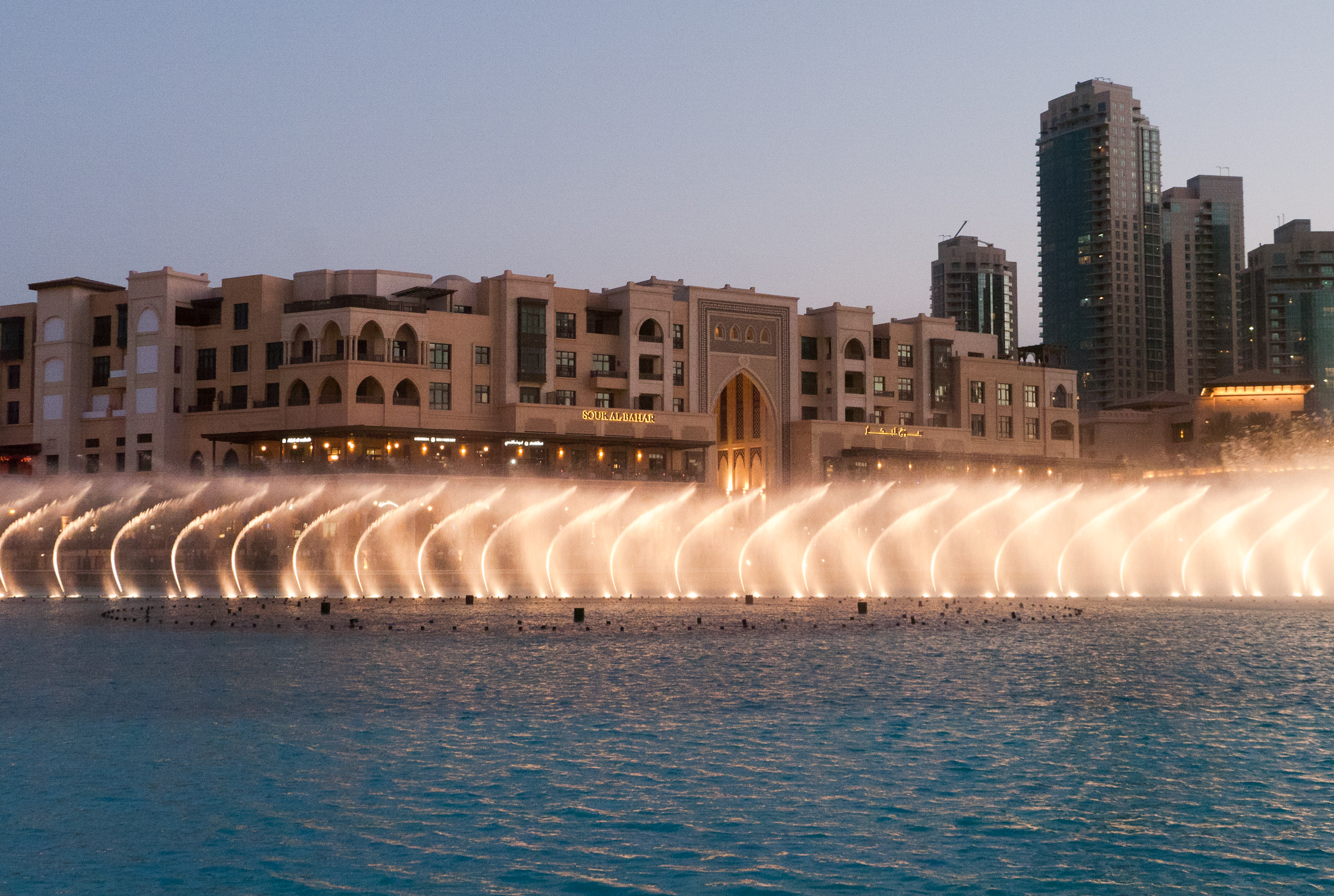
Dubai Fountain at the Dubai Mall

Dubai has been nicknamed the "shopping capital of the Middle East." The city draws large numbers of shopping tourists from countries within the region and from as far as Eastern Europe, Africa and the Indian Subcontinent. Dubai is known for its souk districts. Souk is the Arabic word for market or place where any kind of goods are brought or exchanged. Traditionally, dhows from the Far East, China, Sri Lanka, and India would discharge their cargo and the goods would be bargained over in the souks adjacent to the docks.

Modern shopping malls and boutiques are also found in the city. Dubai Duty Free at Dubai International Airport offers merchandise catering to the multinational passengers using Dubai International Airport. Outside of Duty Free areas and major sales, Dubai has a reputation for being one of the most expensive shopping destinations in the world.

While boutiques, some electronics shops, department stores and supermarkets may operate on a fixed-price basis, most other outlets consider friendly negotiation as a way of life.

Dubai's many shopping centres cater for various consumer's need. Cars, clothing, jewellery, electronics, furnishing, sporting equipment.

The Dubai Shopping Festival is a month-long festival held during the month of January each year. During the festival the entire emirate becomes one massive shopping mall. Additionally, the festival brings together music shows, art exhibitions, and folk dances.

The Dubai Summer Surprises (DSS) is the summer version of Dubai Shopping Festival held during June, July and August. Dubai Government launched Dubai Summer Surprises in 1998 in order to promote Dubai as a family holiday destination. DSS offers fun, entertainment, food deals and great offers on shopping.

== Transportation ==
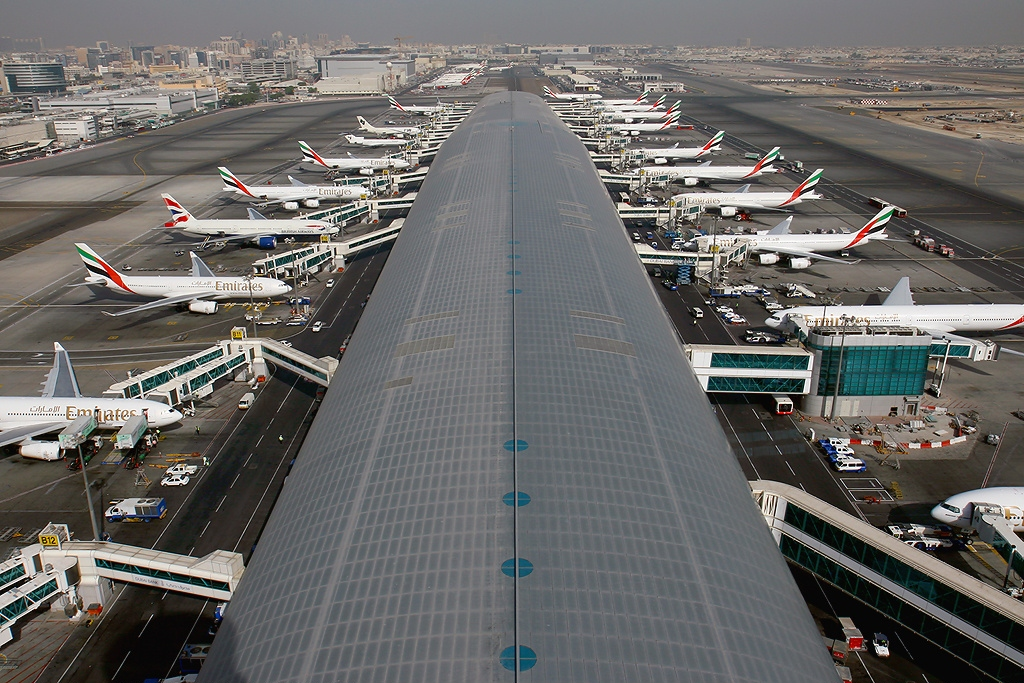
Dubai International Airport is the world's busiest airport by international passenger traffic.

Most capitals and other major cities have direct flights to Dubai. More than 120 airlines operate to and from Dubai International Airport to more than 260 destinations. Dubai International Airport is the world's busiest airport by international passenger traffic. Dubai is also the home base of the airline Emirates, which operates scheduled services to more than 100 destinations.

In June 2009 Emirates designated a special handling area at departures and arrivals for passengers with special needs, allowing wheelchair passengers to receive a more personalized service.

The establishment of the first cruise terminal in Dubai in 2001 and the opening of the enhanced New Dubai Cruise Terminal in February 2010 with higher handling capacity has drawn the attention of cruise line operators. Cruises to Dubai sail from: Singapore, Sydney, Athens, Dover, Venice, Cape Town, Civitavecchia, Piraeus, Alexandria, Istanbul, New York City, Southampton, Barcelona, Fort Lauderdale, Miami, Los Angeles, Mumbai, Hong Kong, Shanghai, Monte Carlo, Mombasa, Victoria, and Cairns among others.

The United Arab Emirates has a network of roads that connect major towns and villages, including a multi-lane highway between Dubai and Abu Dhabi, with access to and from the bordering countries of Saudi Arabia and Oman. Highways and main roads in Dubai and the United Arab Emirates are designated by an Emirate Route Number. Speed limits are displayed on road signs and are usually 60–80 km/h (37–50 mph) around town and 100–120 km/h (62–75 mph) elsewhere.

Dubai ranked third in the best taxi services behind Tokyo and Singapore.

== Nightlife ==
Academic researchers have recently focused on Dubai's nightlife and its intersection with tourism. Magdalena Karolak's research on Dubai as the "party capital of the Middle East" examines how the city has integrated nightlife into its broader tourism strategy, positioning itself as a luxury entertainment destination through the rapid growth of nightclubs, beach clubs, and international music events, particularly within the electronic music scene.

== Illicit drugs ==
Travelers entering Dubai are warned for harsh penalties regarding illicit drug use or smuggling. Authorities in Dubai use highly sensitive equipment to conduct thorough searches to find trace amount of illegal substances. A senior Dubai judge was quoted on February 11, 2008, by the Dubai City News saying, "These laws help discourage anyone from carrying or using drugs. Even if the quantity of illegal drugs found on someone is 0.05 grams, they will be found guilty. The penalty is a minimum of four years. The message is clear — drugs will not be tolerated."

== Health ==
No special immunizations are required, but tourists are encouraged to purchase appropriate medical insurance before travelling. Government immunization programs have led to recognition by a travel magazine. As a latest addition to the established modern health care system, Dubai offers online health care contacts of virtually all medical doctors in Dubai.

== Sports tourism ==
Dubai hosts the following international championships:

- Dubai World Cup – the richest horse race in the world
- Dubai Classic - the golf championship
- Barclays Dubai Tennis for both men and women
- UIM World Powerboat racing
- Rugby Sevens
- Dubai International Rally
- Dubai Snooker Classic
- The UAE Desert Challenge
- The Standard Chartered Dubai Marathon

== See also ==
- Developments in Dubai
- List of development projects in Dubai
- List of tourist attractions in the United Arab Emirates
- Palm Islands
