= 1 Dubai =

- واحد دبي
- Former names: AC Towers

General information
- Status: Vision
- Location: Dubai, United Arab Emirates
- Coordinates: 24.9822°N 55.4029°E
- Construction started: TBA
- Estimated completion: TBA

Height
- Antenna spire: over 1,010 m (3,310 ft)

Technical details
- Floor count: 201 (Tower 1)

Design and construction
- Architect: Adrian Smith + Gordon Gill Architecture
- Developer: Meraas
- Structural engineer: Halvorson and Partners

1 Dubai was a planned complex of three skyscrapers proposed for Jumeirah Garden City in Dubai, United Arab Emirates. Tower 1 would have been the tallest, and Towers 2 and 3 much shorter. Although the planned height was never officially released, various heights over 1,008 m (3,307 ft) were suggested, with the intention to be taller than Burj Khalifa which was under construction at the time. The complex was designed by Adrian Smith + Gordon Gill Architecture, and the developer was Meraas.

The structure of the building would have been connected by a series of glass skybridges and at the base of the skyscraper there would have been grand arched entrances, that would have allowed boats to travel underneath the building and into a central atrium space. The mixed-use development would have included a hotel, residential, commercial, retail and entertainment space totaling over 800,000 m^{2} (8,600,000 sq ft). However, in 2009, the project was cancelled.

== See also ==
- Meraas Tower
- Jumeirah Garden City
