= Hatta Mountain Conservation Reserve =

Coordinates: 24°46′25″N 56°06′25″E

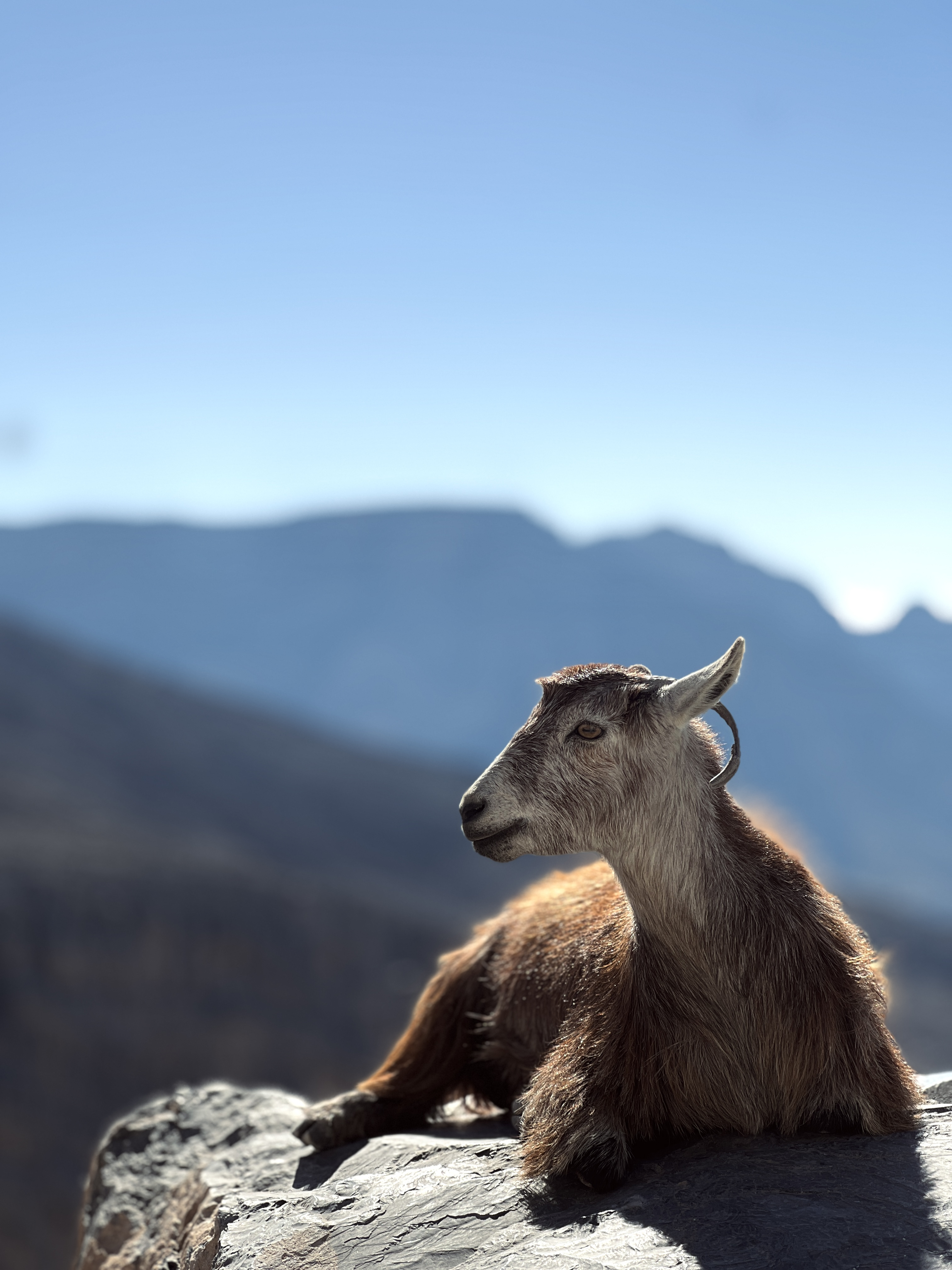
Arabian Tahr

The Hatta Mountain Conservation Reserve shelters the biggest number of the endangered Arabian Tahr animals in the United Arab Emirates. The mountainous environment makes a safe space for many plants and animals. The place is also ideal for adventure lovers and mountain bike riders.

== Overview ==
The Hatta Mountain Conservation Reserve is located on the borders of the United Arab Emirates, 30 km east of Dubai, and it is affiliated with the emirate of Dubai. The reserve is home for 348 different plant and animal species, including many that are endangered. Based on the decree no. 22 of 2014, Dubai Municipality directs the reserve in its entirety. Moreover, the reserve is the only place in Dubai that has fresh water, and its ecosystem is home to many living things; it includes 19% of the total registered plants in the UAE, 79% of dragonflies, 27% of birds, 44% of mammals, and 30% of amphibians and reptiles.

== Activities To Do ==
=== Mountain Bikes Riding ===
The reserve has paths that are as long as 52 km, some of which are for beginner mountain bike riders.

=== Hiking ===
The reserve is surrounded by mountain ranges, making hiking and walking a unique experience.

=== Kayaking ===
Hatta is generally known for its kayaking and rowing activities. Other than doing it for fun, kayaking also enables visitors to reach places hidden behind the mountains.

== Other Reserves in The UAE ==
- Al Wathba Reserve located in the city of Abu Dhabi.
- Al Khawaneej Reserve located in the city of Dubai.
- Nad Al Sheba Reserve located in Dubai.
- Mushrif Park Buffer Zone Reserve located in Dubai.
- Al Awir Reserve located in Dubai.
- Al Yasat Reserve located in Abu Dhabi.
- Marawah Nature Reserve located in Abu Dhabi.
- The famous Sir Bu Nair Reserve located in Sharjah.
- Al Aqah Nature Reserve located in Fujairah.
- Dana Nature Reserve located in Fujairah.
- Al Badna Nature Reserve located in Fujairah.
- Al-Faqeet Nature Reserve located in Fujairah.
