= Green Planet =

Green Planet may refer to:

- E.T.: The Book of the Green Planet, a 1985 novel and sequel to E.T. the Extra-Terrestrial
- The Queen's Green Planet, a 2018 documentary with David Attenborough at Buckingham Palace Garden
- Surviving Mars: Green Planet, a 2019 expansion pack for the video game Surviving Mars
- The Green Planet (TV series), a 2022 nature documentary series presented by David Attenborough
- Green Planet Energy, a German electric utility
- The Green Planet, Dubai, an indoor zoo and garden with an artificial bio-dome in Dubai, United Arab Emirates
