= List of development projects in Dubai =

The government's decision to diversify from an oil-based economy, and to make Dubai the main hub of tourists in the world, has made and other developmental projects such as Dubailand, more valuable, resulting in the property boom from 2004 to 2007. There are over 1,500 major freehold developments and communities in Dubai. Construction on a large scale is a part of Dubai Strategic Plan 2015 unveiled by Mohammed bin Rashid Al Maktoum, the Ruler of Dubai, to maintain economic growth and to put Dubai on the map of the world, and a tourist destination of the world. Construction on a large scale has turned Dubai into one of the fastest-growing cities in the world. There are a number of large-scale projects which are currently under construction or will be constructed in the future. Due to the heavy construction which is taking place in Dubai, 30,000 construction cranes, which is 25% of cranes worldwide, were operating in Dubai in 2012. Currently multibillion-dollar construction projects are taking shape in Dubai.

== Great Recession ==
However, due to the Great Recession, several mega projects were put on hold, including the Palm Islands, Dubailand, the Arabian canal, Dubai Exhibition City, The Lagoons, and Jumeirah Garden City. Apart from this, many supertall skyscrapers have also been put on hold which includes the Pentominium, Burj Al Alam, Marina 106, and Dubai Towers Dubai. Construction on Palm Jebel Ali and The World Islands were expected to be resumed in 2010, however recommencement has been further delayed. Construction on other halted projects was thought likely to be resumed in 2011.

== Recovery from the Great Recession ==
A report published by Forbes on October 22, 2012, says Dubai recovered faster from the Great Recession faster than most other countries and now its economy is growing in a higher rate than its counterparts because of its zero tax policy and economic free zones. The estimated GDP growth rate of Dubai in 2012 was 4.5%. The growth was mainly driven by the tourism, commerce and industrial manufacturing sectors.

According to the UAE's Ministry of Finance, Dubai's government has allocated 32.3 billion dirhams ($8.8 billion) for infrastructure projects in 2012, marking a return to big spending on such projects as some of these projects had been stalled due to lack of funding.

In November 2012, Sheikh Mohammed bin Rashid Al Maktoum announced fifteen new projects worth more than $187 million. These projects are a part of the municipality's 2013 to 2015 strategic plan of Dubai.

== Mixed use developments ==
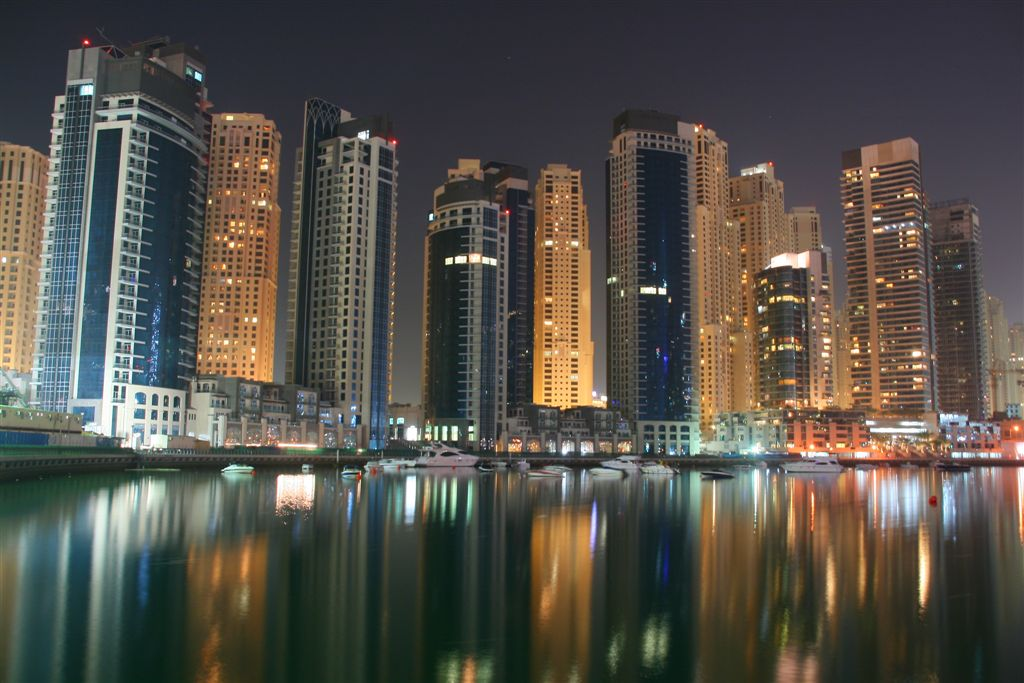
Dubai Marina

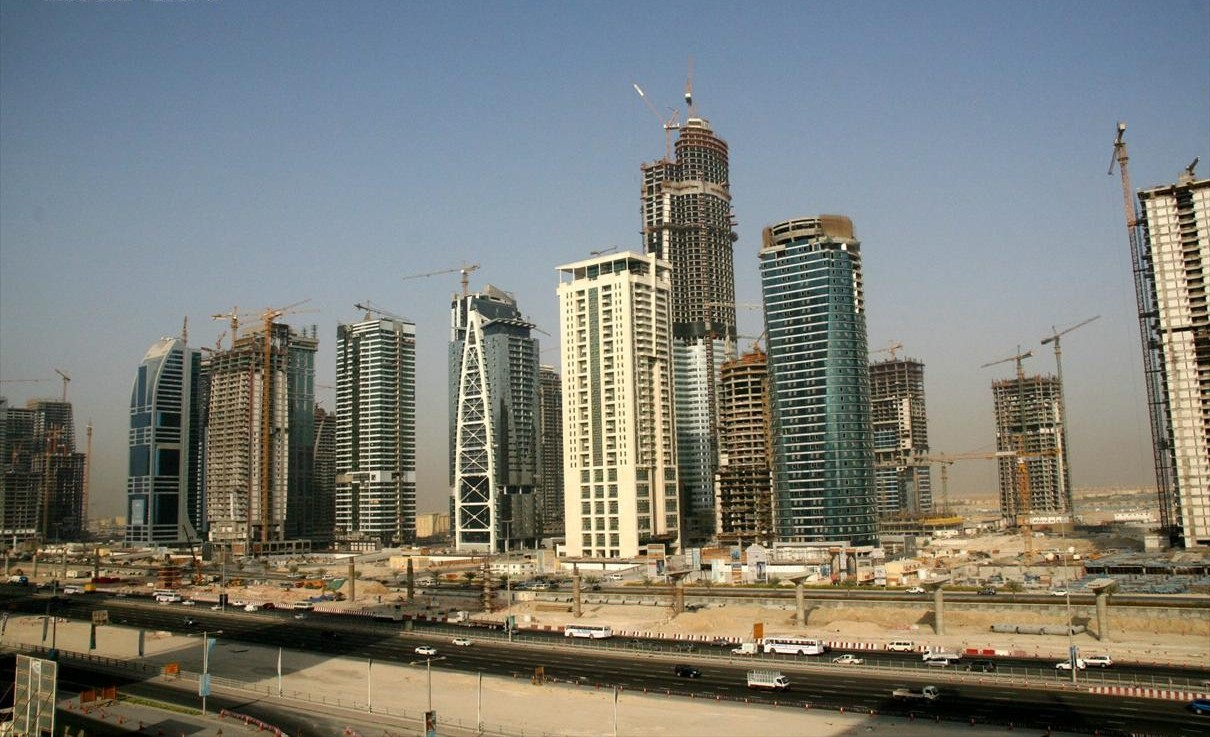
Jumeirah Lake Towers under construction in 2007

	Project	Developer	Expected completion	Costs	Area	Description
1	Dubai Marina	Emaar	Complete		1.56 km^{2} (0.60 sq mi)	World's largest man-made marina, with 200 residential and hotel high rises
2	Nakheel Properties		Complete		1.8 km^{2} (0.69 sq mi)	Comprises 79 high-rises, mostly residential skyscrapers
3	Business Bay	Dubai Properties Group	Complete	AED 110 billion (US$30 billion)	80 million sq. ft.	Comprises 240 high- and low-rise buildings, mostly residential and mixed-use skyscrapers.
4	Jumeirah Garden City^{[A]}	Meraas	On hold	AED 350 billion	9 km^{2} (3.5 sq mi)	
5	Culture Village	Dubai Properties	mid-2016		3.71 km^{2} (1.43 sq mi)	
6	Jumeirah Village	Nakheel Properties	2013	AED 2.4 million	8.11 km^{2} (3.13 sq mi)	
7	Jebel Ali village	Nakheel Properties	2013		5.20 km^{2} (2.01 sq mi)	The city is expected to accommodate around 500,000 people.
8	Al Maktoum International Airport	Dubai Holding	2030	US $80 billion	1.56 km^{2} (0.60 sq mi)	Upon completion it will be the largest airport in the world.
9	Dubai Creek Harbour	Emaar	late 2020		70 km^{2} (27 sq mi)	
10	Dubai The Sustainable City	Diamond Developers	Complete		46 hectare	The first net zero energy city in Dubai
11	Dubai Investment Park		Incomplete		2,300 hectares	Includes the Lagoons, under development by Schön Properties since 2005; Schön's assets were seized by the Dubai Real Estate Regulatory Agency in August 2018 over the company's failure to complete the development.

== Other projects ==
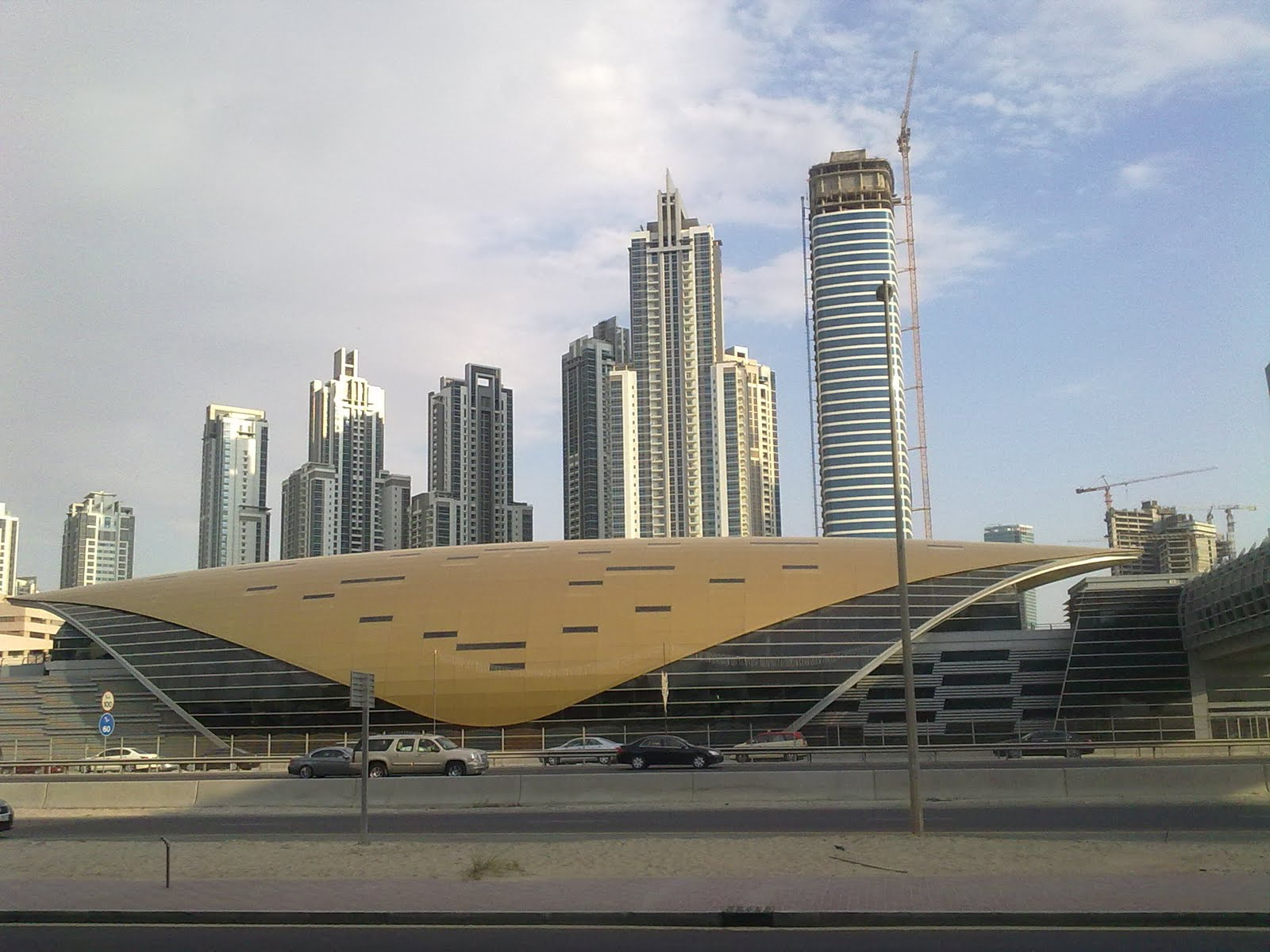
Business Bay in 2012

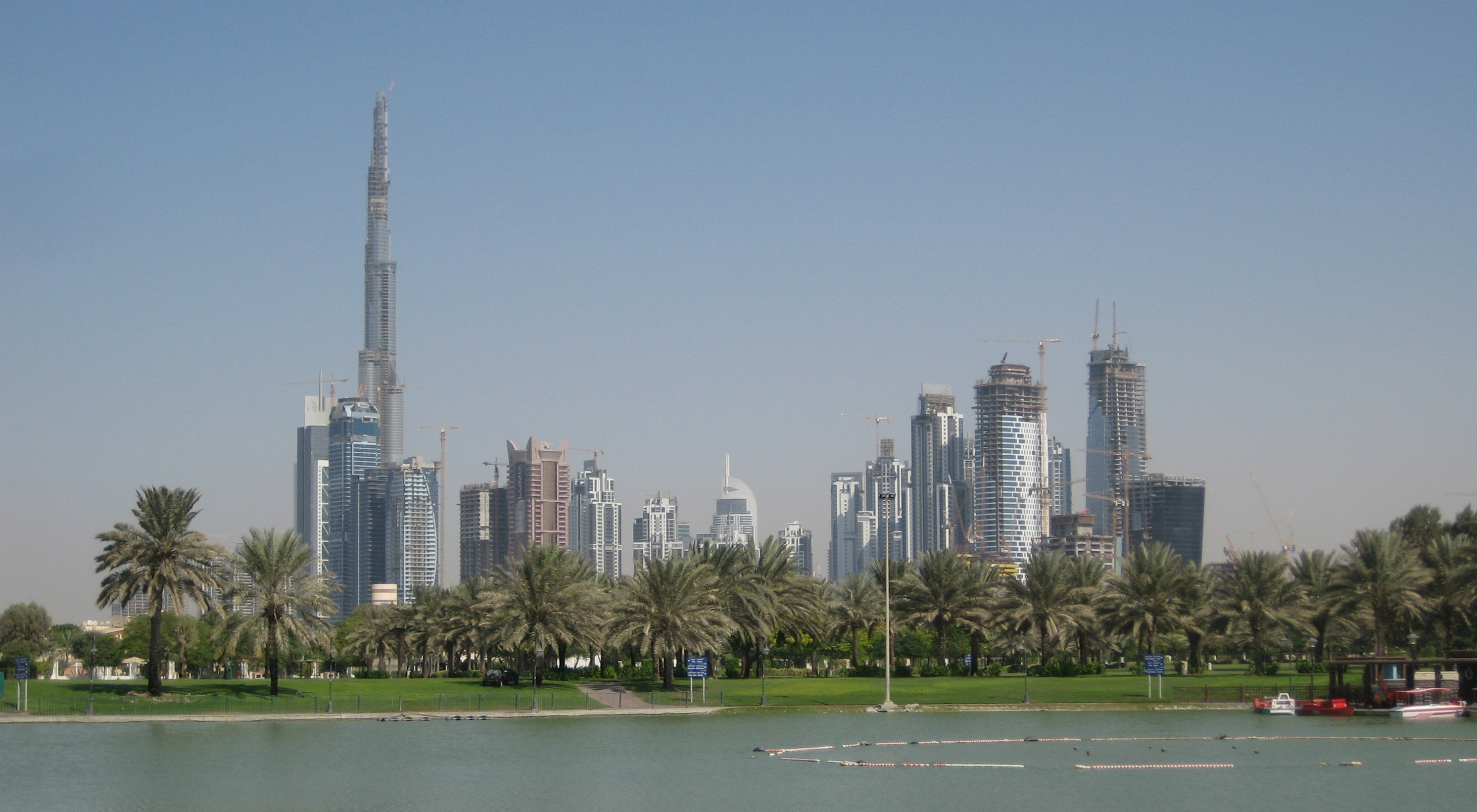
Skyline of Business Bay, Dubai as seen from Safa Park

	Project	Developer	Expected completion	Costs	Area	Description
1	Dubailand^{[C]}	Dubai Holding	Partially under construction, 2020	US$64.3 billion	278 km^{2} (107 sq mi)	Dubailand will be the world's largest retail and entertainment world, twice the size of Walt Disney World Resort. It includes 45 mega projects and 200 sub-projects. Currently, there are 22 projects under construction; 6 are complete.
2	Arabian Canal^{[A]}	Limitless	Halted temporarily	US$50 billion	75 km long	This will be the world's largest man-made canal. Construction work on Phase 1 of Arabian Canal is currently in progress, but construction on much of the Arabian Canal is currently halted.
3	Jumeirah Garden City	Meraas	Halted	US$95 billion	9,000,000-square-metre	Jumeirah Garden City will be built across an area north of Sheikh Zayed Road between Diyafa Street and Safa Park.
4	Dubai International City	Nakheel Properties	Complete	US$95 billion	8.2 km^{2} (3.2 sq mi)	Dubai International city is a country-themed architecture of residences, businesses, and tourist attractions.
5	Dubai Exhibition City^{[A]}		On hold	AED 8 billion	280,000 m2	Dubai Exhibition City upon completion will home to the world's longest single column-free exhibition hall.
6	Dubai Meydan City		Partially complete	AED 8 billion	3,700,000 m2	The development includes Meydan Racecourse hotels, sky-bubble restaurant, entertainment, clubs, a concourse plaza, towers and a boat-house.
7	Mohammed bin Rashid City		Partially complete	AED 8 billion	800 million sq ft	The development includes Meydan Racecourse hotels, sky-bubble restaurant, entertainment, clubs, a concourse plaza, towers and a boat-house.
8	Al Sufouh Tramway	Dubai Roads and Transport Authority (RTA)	November 2014	AED 3.18 billion	14.5 kilometers (9.0 mi) long	Al Sufouh Tramway is a tramway being built in Al Sufouh, Dubai. It will run along Al Sufouh Road from Dubai Marina to the Burj Al Arab and the Mall of the Emirates.
9	Dubai Frame		Complete	AED 160 Million	150-metre-high, 93-metre-wide	Dubai Frame is a tourist attraction built near the Star Gate of Zabeel Park.
10	Arabian Ranches	Emaar Properties	Complete			Arabian Ranches is a premium gated community located on Sheikh Mohammad bin Zayed Road and in proximity to Dubai's Global Village. It includes the Arabian Ranches Golf Club and Dubai Equestrian & Polo Club.

[ Canada business tower in Dubai ]

== Artificial reclaimed islands developments ==
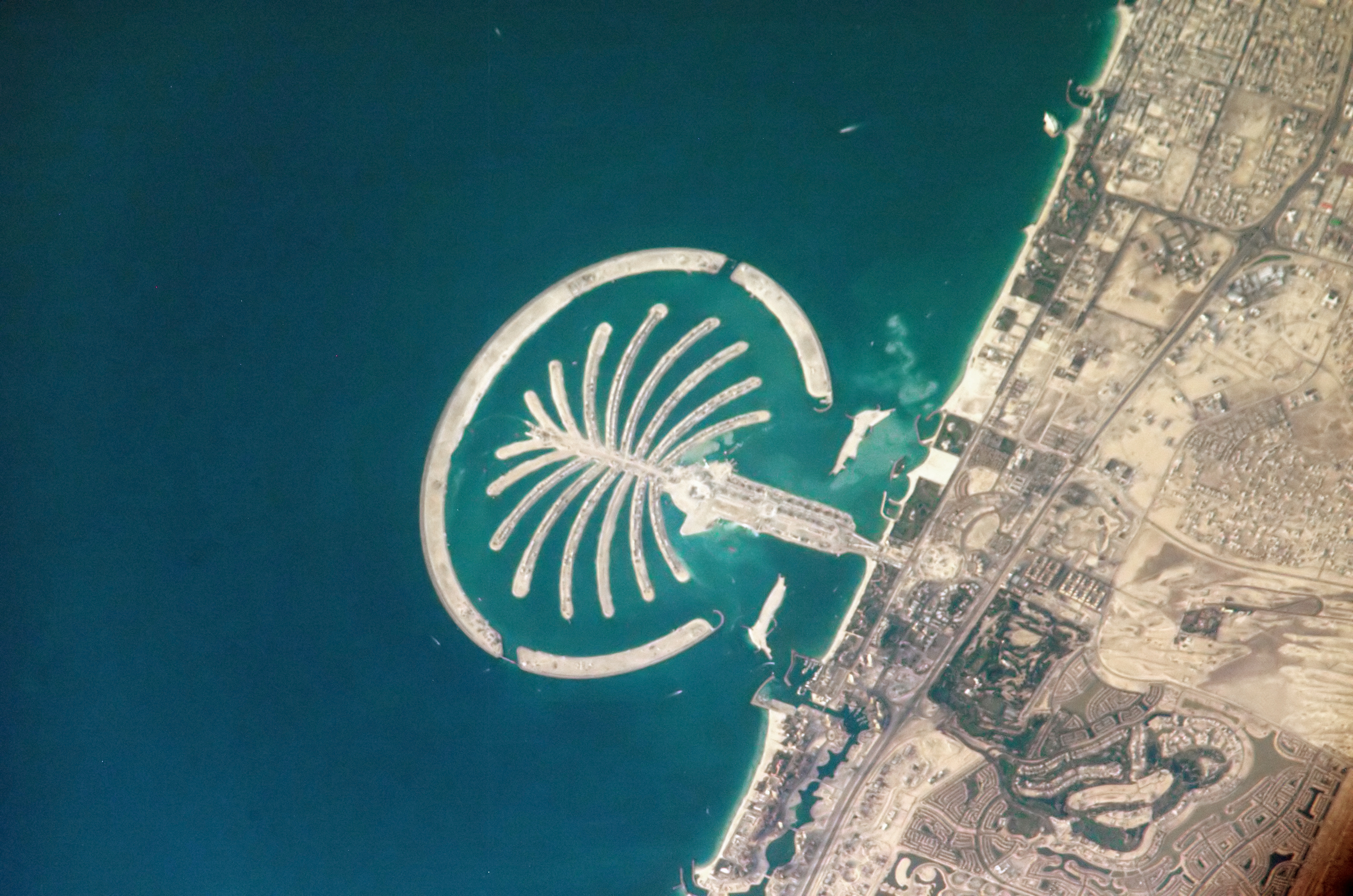
Aerial view of Palm Jumeirah

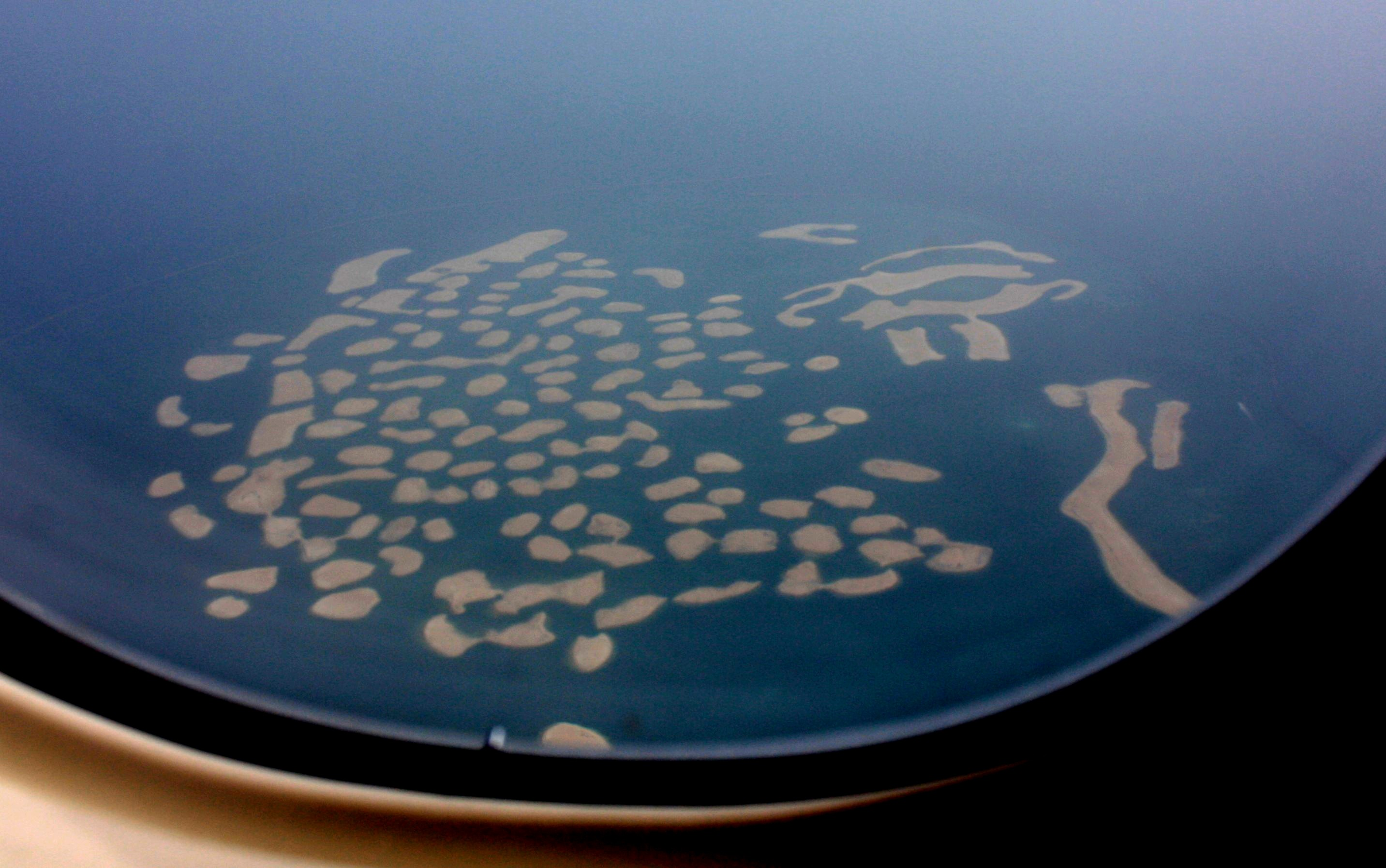
The World Islands in 2010

	Project	Developer	Expected completion	Costs	Area	Description
1	Palm Jumeirah	Nakheel Properties	Complete	$12.3 billion		It is the world's largest man-made island.
2	Palm Jebel Ali^{[A]}	Nakheel Properties	Ongoing			It will accommodate over 250,000 people by 2020. Construction resumed in 2023.
3	Dubai Islands^{[A]}	Nakheel Properties	scaled down, no official opening date announced		12.5 km^{2} (4.8 sq mi) by 7.5 km^{2} (2.9 sq mi)	Will be the largest palm island in Dubai.
4	The Universe^{[B]}	Nakheel Properties	On hold		30 km^{2} (12 sq mi)	
5	The World Islands^{[A]}	Nakheel Properties	complete, but most islands are still unoccupied	$14 billion	9 km (5.6 mi) and 6 km^{2} (2.3 sq mi) width	
6	Dubai Waterfront^{[A]}	Nakheel Properties	On hold		970 km^{2} (370 sq mi)	The Dubai Waterfront is expected to become the largest waterfront and largest man-made development in the world.
7	Skydive Dubai	Nakheel Properties	2012		1.06 km^{2} (0.41 sq mi)	
8	Dubai Maritime City^{[A]}	Dubai Holding	Complete	AED 3 billion	2.27 km^{2} (0.88 sq mi)	It will be the world's first purpose-built maritime centre.
9	Jumeirah Garden City^{[A]}	Meraas	2013	AED 350 billion	9 km^{2} (3.5 sq mi)	Some portion of this development is being reclaimed off the coast near Jumeirah.
10	Bluewaters Island^{[D]}	Meraas	2018	AED 6 billion		Announced on February 13, 2013. the Ain Dubai (formerly the Dubai Eye) giant Ferris wheel will be built on this island. Construction is almost finished.
11	Dubai Harbour	Meraas	2022	AED 8 billion	135 km^{2} (52 sq mi)	Announced on January 2, 2017. Palm Jumeirah Logo Island Construction Dubai Harbour and Emaar Beachfront by Emaar.
12	The Island by Wasl	Wasl Asset Management Group	2028	AED 10 billion		Announced in March 2017. Porto Dubai cancelled construction Jumeirah Beach MGM Resort, Bellagio Hotel 1,000 rooms and 500,000 square.
13	Naia Island	Shamal Holding	2029		350 km^{2} (140 sq mi)	Announced in June 2025. Shamal Holding development islands name Naia Island.

== Bridges ==
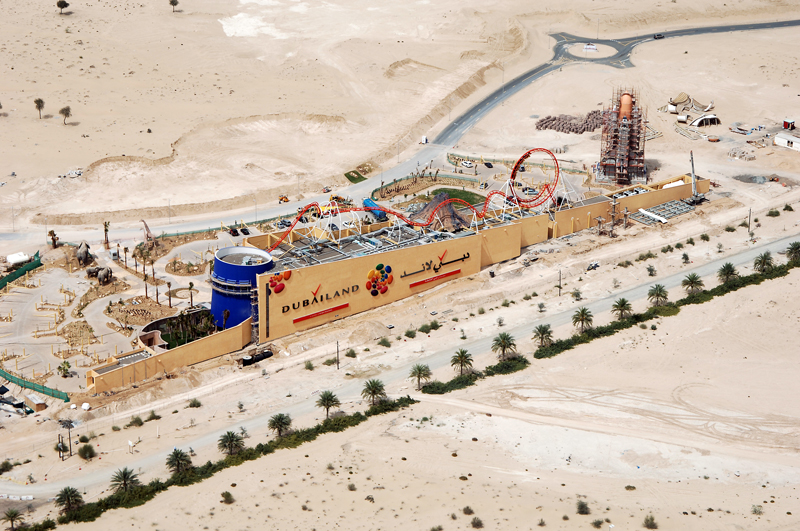
The site office and showroom, Dubailand sales center, March 7, 2006

	Project	Developer	Expected completion	Costs	Length	Description
1	Sheikh Rashid bin Saeed Crossing	Dubai Roads and Transport Authority	75% completed as of 2022	2.5 billion dirhams	1.6 km (0.99 mi)	It will be the world's longest arch bridge.
2	Al Ittihad Bridge	Dubai Roads and Transport Authority	Completed in 2012	810 million dirhams	300 meters	

Notes
A. Construction is currently on hold due to lack of finances.
B. Project is currently in planning stages.
C. Only 22 out of 200 sub-projects of Dubailand are under construction.
D. Approved; construction will start in April, 2013.

== See also ==
- Dubai Real Estate Regulatory Agency
- List of buildings in Dubai
- List of hotels in Dubai
- List of shopping malls in Dubai
- Tourist attractions in Dubai
