= Porto Dubai =

Porto Dubai is a residential development under construction off the coast, near the Umm Suqeim marina in Jumeirah on an artificial self-reclaimed island. The development endows luxury villas, restaurants, a spa, and a health club. The estimated cost of Porto Dubai is AED 2.1 billion. The reclamation work on porto dubai has been completed including 1 million square metres of sand and rock. The villas will be arranged in a circular pattern on the peninsula's four platforms. However, construction was halted in 2009, in favour of a new project announced on 22 March 2017, namely Jumeirah Beach MGM Resort.

== See also ==
- Jumeirah Garden City
- List of development projects in Dubai
