= List of parks in Dubai =

This is a list of public parks in Dubai, United Arab Emirates.

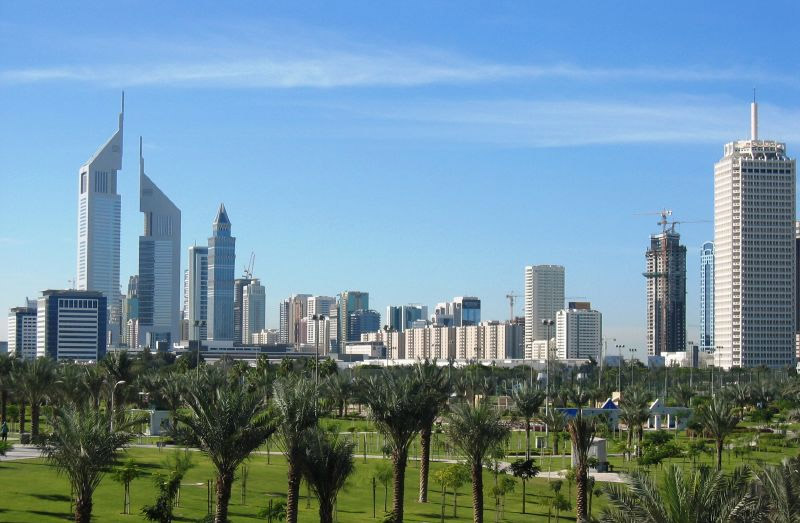
Zabeel Park, Dubai

== Public parks ==
- Al Barsha Pond Park, Al Barsha 2
- Al Mamzar Beach Park, Deira
- Al Muteena Park, Al Muteena, Deira
- Al Nahda Pond Park, Al Nahda
- Al Twar Park, Al Tawr
- Burj Park, Downtown Dubai
- Creekside Park, Bur Dubai
- Jumeirah Beach Park, Jumeirah Beach Road
- Mushrif Park, Al Khawanij
- Safa Park, Sheikh Zayed Road
- Zabeel Park, Sheikh Zayed Road
- Al Qusais Pond Park, Al Qusais
- Al Rashidiya Park

== Theme parks ==
- IMG Worlds of Adventure
- Motiongate Dubai
- LEGOLAND Dubai
- Real Madrid World

== Water Parks ==
- Aquaventure Water park, Atlantis, The Palm
- Wild Wadi Water Park, Jumeirah Beach Road
- Grand Hyatt Dubai Waterpark
- Jungle Bay Waterpark
- LEGOLAND Water Park

== Other Parks ==
- Dubai Butterfly Garden, Al Barsha 3
- Dubai Miracle Garden, Al Barsha 3 South
- Aventura Park
- Quranic park

== Closed Parks ==
- Bollywood Park Dubai

== Canceled Parks ==
- 20th Century Fox World
- Six Flags Dubai
- Marvel Superheroes Theme Park
- Zombie Apocalypse Park Dubai

== See also ==
- List of development projects in Dubai
- List of hotels in Dubai
- Tourist attractions in Dubai
