= Arabian Canal =

Infrastructure project in the United Arab Emirates

The Arabian Canal is a proposed mega-infrastructure project located in the United Arab Emirates that aims to create a man-made waterway connecting the Persian Gulf to the Arabian Sea.

== Location ==
The Arabian Canal is planned to be situated in the eastern region of the UAE, spanning across the emirates of Abu Dhabi, Dubai, and Sharjah. It would traverse the desert landscape, cutting through the Hajar Mountains and connecting the Persian Gulf near the Saudi Arabian border to the Arabian Sea.

== Purpose and objectives ==
=== Trade and transportation ===
The canal would serve as a strategic trade route, providing a shortcut for vessels traveling between the Persian Gulf and the Arabian Sea. By reducing shipping distances and time, it aims to enhance the UAE's position as a global trade and logistics hub.

=== Economic growth ===
The project is expected to stimulate economic growth by attracting investments, creating job opportunities, and promoting commercial activities in the areas surrounding the canal. It would facilitate the movement of goods, fostering trade and boosting the UAE's overall economy.

=== Tourism and development ===
The Arabian Canal envisions the development of new waterfront areas, marinas, and tourism destinations along its route. These developments would enhance the UAE's tourism industry, attracting visitors with recreational activities, resorts, and vibrant urban spaces.

== Project features ==
The Arabian Canal is envisioned to possess several key features, including:

=== Length and width ===
The proposed length of the canal is approximately 75 kilometers (47 miles), spanning from the Persian Gulf to the Arabian Sea. The width of the canal would vary between 150 and 500 meters (490 and 1,640 feet) to accommodate different types of vessels.

=== Water supply ===
To maintain the required water volume and quality, the canal is expected to draw seawater from the Persian Gulf. Advanced water management systems would be employed to ensure a consistent flow and minimize environmental impact.

=== Locks and bridges ===
The canal would incorporate locks at specific points along its route to accommodate vessels and adjust water levels as necessary. Additionally, multiple bridges would be constructed to allow vehicular and pedestrian traffic to cross the canal.

=== Ports and terminal facilities ===
The Arabian Canal project includes plans for the development of new ports and terminal facilities along its course. These facilities would handle cargo shipments and provide necessary infrastructure for efficient trade operations.

=== Waterfront developments ===
The project aims to create vibrant waterfront developments, including residential, commercial, and leisure zones, adjacent to the canal. These areas would feature modern infrastructure, attractive architecture, and recreational spaces to enhance the quality of life for residents and attract tourists.

=== Environmental considerations ===
Environmental assessments and studies would be conducted to ensure minimal impact on the surrounding ecosystems during the construction and operation of the canal. Sustainable practices, preservation of natural habitats, and environmental mitigation measures would be employed to protect biodiversity and maintain ecological balance.

== Project overview ==
The Arabian Canal project is still in the planning and conceptualization phase. The project represents a significant long-term undertaking that requires extensive engineering, environmental evaluations, and financial investments. Detailed design, feasibility studies, and further evaluations would be necessary before the project can proceed to construction. It is recommended to refer to official sources or recent news for the latest updates on the Arabian Canal project. The canal is being developed by the company Limitless.

The canal, originally planned to be completed in 2012, but has been on hold since 2009. If completed, it would require the excavation of 1.1 billion cubic meters of soil. The canal itself was projected to cost $11 billion, and would snake from Dubai Waterfront in Jebel Ali and pass to the east of the Dubai World Central development before turning back towards the Palm Jumeirah. Plans also called for $50 billion to be spent constructing a new "city" within the city, which would take 20,000 hectares of land in the south bank of the channel. The Arabian canal would be 150 metres wide and six metres deep, enough to accommodate yachts up to 40 metres long.

The canal was designed to be fully navigable, with locks on each end for tidal control. Water is to flow through the canal to prevent stagnation.

=== Engineers ===
Calthorpe Associates, an urban design firm in California, designed and was overseeing the canal plan. Calthorpe collaborated with the landscape architecture firm SWA Group, and the engineering firms Moffatt & Nichol, Parsons International, Mott MacDonald, and Torti Gallas and Partners.

== See also ==
- List of development projects in Dubai
- Elphinstone Inlet
