= Canadian University Dubai =

Private university in Dubai

- الجامعة الكندية دبي
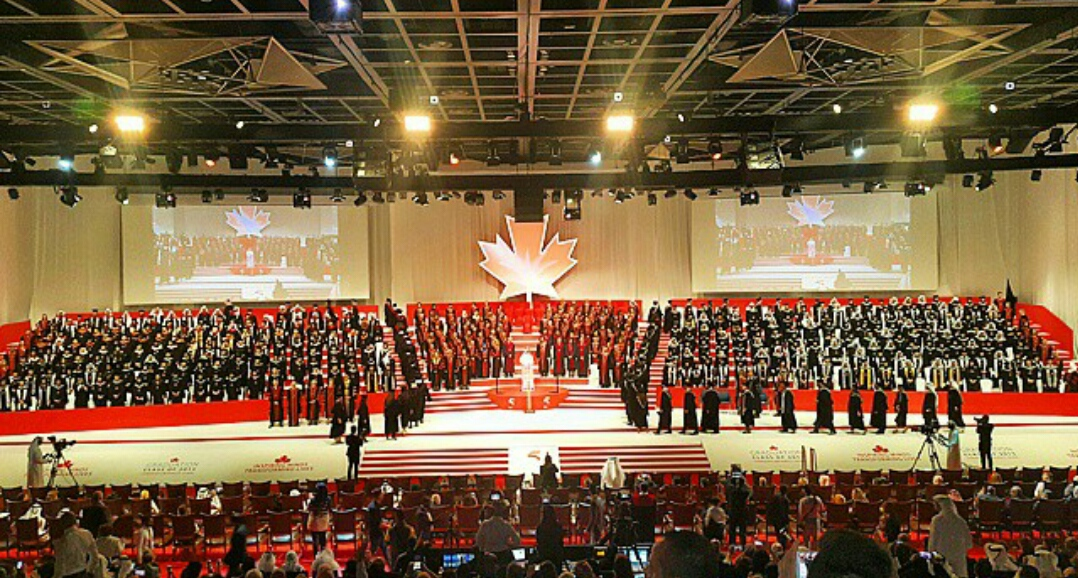
- Canadian University Dubai Graduation
- Motto: Your portal to Canadian education
- Type: Private
- Established: 2006
- Academic affiliations: MOHESR
- President: Professor Karim Chelli
- Faculty: ~100
- Administrative staff: ~50
- Students: ~3,000
- Undergraduates: ~2,400
- Postgraduates: ~600
- Location: Dubai, United Arab Emirates; 25.20771599051865°N 55.26437500956715°E
- Campus: City Walk Dubai
- Colors: White, red
- Nickname: CUD
- Mascot: CUD Wolves
- Website: cud.ac.ae

The Canadian University Dubai, popularly known as CUD, is a private university in Dubai, United Arab Emirates, founded in 2006. The Canadian University Dubai offers education based on the Canadian curriculum. The university has recently opened a new campus located in the heart of Dubai, in City Walk.

The university was originally known as Centennial University of Dubai. This title was changed to Canadian University Dubai once it became an independent Canadian institution. The university maintains its ties with the original Ontario-based Centennial College, offering students transfer programs after their second year.

== Schools and departments ==
The academic programs at Canadian University Dubai (CUD) are organized into six primary schools.

=== School of Architecture and Interior Design ===
The School of Architecture and Interior Design offers academic programs in architectural and interior design. It is divided into two departments:

- Department of Architecture
- Department of Interior Design

=== School of Communication ===
The School of Communication offers academic programs focused on media and communications. The curriculum encompasses three primary specializations:

- Advertising and Integrated Marketing
- Digital Media and Journalism
- Public Relations

=== School of Creative Industries ===
Located at the Dubai City Walk campus, the School of Creative Industries offers academic programs in design, media, and digital arts.

=== School of Engineering, Applied Science and Technology ===
The School of Engineering, Applied Science and Technology offers programs in computational sciences and engineering. It comprises two departments:

- Department of Computer Engineering and Computational Sciences
- Department of Electrical Engineering

=== School of Management ===
The School of Management offers academic programs in business and management. It is organized into two primary divisions:

- Graduate Department
- Undergraduate Department

=== School of Health Sciences, Digital Innovation and Sustainability ===
The School of Health Sciences, Digital Innovation and Sustainability offers academic programs in public health and environmental studies. It consists of two departments:

- Department of Environmental Innovation and Sustainability
- Department of Public Health

== Sustainability ==
Canadian University Dubai (CUD) integrates sustainability into its academic programs, research, and campus operations. The institution has aligned its environmental policies with the United Arab Emirates' Net Zero by 2050 Strategic Initiative, with the stated goal of progressively reducing greenhouse gas emissions.

The university's sustainability framework incorporates the United Nations Sustainable Development Goals (SDGs). Its specific operational and academic focus areas include clean water and sanitation (SDG 6), affordable and clean energy (SDG 7), sustainable cities and communities (SDG 11), and climate action (SDG 13). Additionally, the university is a partner of the United Nations Principles for Responsible Management Education (UN PRME).

The institution's environmental research and campus initiatives are coordinated through its Center for Sustainability & Innovation. These programs support broader national strategies, including the UAE Vision 2031 and the UAE Centennial 2071 objectives.

== Learning Resource Centre ==
The Learning Resource Centre, located on the first floor of the HUB Building, houses over 10,000 print collections, including books, journals, newspapers and electronic resources.

University rankings

Global – Overall
- QS World: =604 (2026)

== See also ==
- Education in the United Arab Emirates
- Centennial College
