= Jumeirah Garden City =

Construction in Dubai

Coordinates: 25°05′N 55°18′E

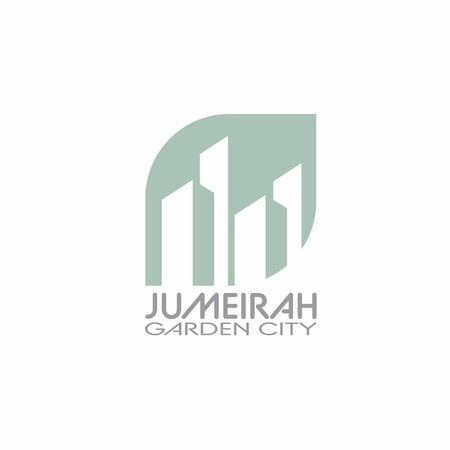
Official Logo

The master plan of Jumeirah Garden City refers to the re-development of a 9,000,000-square-metre (97,000,000 sq ft) land area, conceptualized to be a part of the 2015 strategic plan for Dubai. The development consists of 12 districts with an envision built up area of 14,000,000 square metres (150,000,000 sq ft). The Jumeirah Garden City aims to cater to a population of 50,000 to 60,000 residents. The project will cost approximately Dh350 billion (approx. $95bn).

The announcement of the project coincided with the Great Recession, and the construction of the project was put on hold due to the recession.

== Development ==
Jumeirah Garden City will be built over a period of 12 years, across an area north of Sheikh Zayed Road between Diyafa Street and Safa Park. Meraas Development has commissioned architect Adrian Smith of Adrian Smith + Gordon Gill Architecture to design four new projects as part of the Jumeirah Garden master plan.

The development will improve living standards of some people living in neighborhoods of Dubai. The project will comprise seven distinct areas, taking up approximately 110,000,000 square feet (10,000,000 m^{2}) of land, including the self reclaimed artificial islands. One section will host Dubai Park, which will be half the size of Safa Park. Phase one of Jumeirah Gardens will cover around 820,000 square metres (8,800,000 sq ft).

== Construction phases ==
The first phase of Jumeirah Garden City will comprise six main blocks of high-, mid- and low-rise office, retail and residential buildings, two hotels and a high-end shopping area. Handover of phase one is expected to be start by the end of fourth quarter of 2011 and the whole phase will be fully ready in 2013. Jumeirah Garden City will also contain a huge park which will surround all the residential apartments, villas and other office and commercial buildings. This development primarily consists of the re-development Satwa and Al-Wasl, with the inclusion of newly developed islands off the coastline of the primary land mass development. The developer Meraas was planning eight landmark buildings in Jumeirah Garden City, however, many such as 1 Dubai, 1 Park Avenue, and Meraas Tower were cancelled due to financial issues. The project also include Park gate which will comprise a complex of six buildings. The self-reclaimed artificial islands will be made up of east bay and coastal and will mainly entail the residences, but will also contain hotels and resorts.

== Sustainability targets ==
Economically, sustainable practices help to shrink costs and will optimize the productivity of the individuals. On a smaller scale, adherents to sustainable building practices will find considerable improvements over the traditional building model with their structure’s long-term durability and reduced life cycle costs. In view of these positive impacts, it is clear that Eco-friendly buildings are of the utmost importance on both a local and a global scale. This precedent for sustainability is the impulsion behind the development of the Jumeirah Garden City. This development has been envisioned to be a development representing the highest standards of sustainability and is expected to be a revolutionary example to the rest of Dubai, as well as the rest of the world.

== Transportation ==
The districts will be linked to each other and to the rest of Dubai by a central canal, a network of public transport systems such as roads and boulevards, a light rail system as well as pedestrian walkways.

== See also ==
- List of tallest buildings in Dubai
- Developments in Dubai
- Sheikh Zayed Road
- Porto Dubai
- List of bridges and tunnels in Dubai
