= City Walk, Dubai =

Area of Dubai, United Arab Emirates

Coordinates: 25.20753°N 55.26250°E

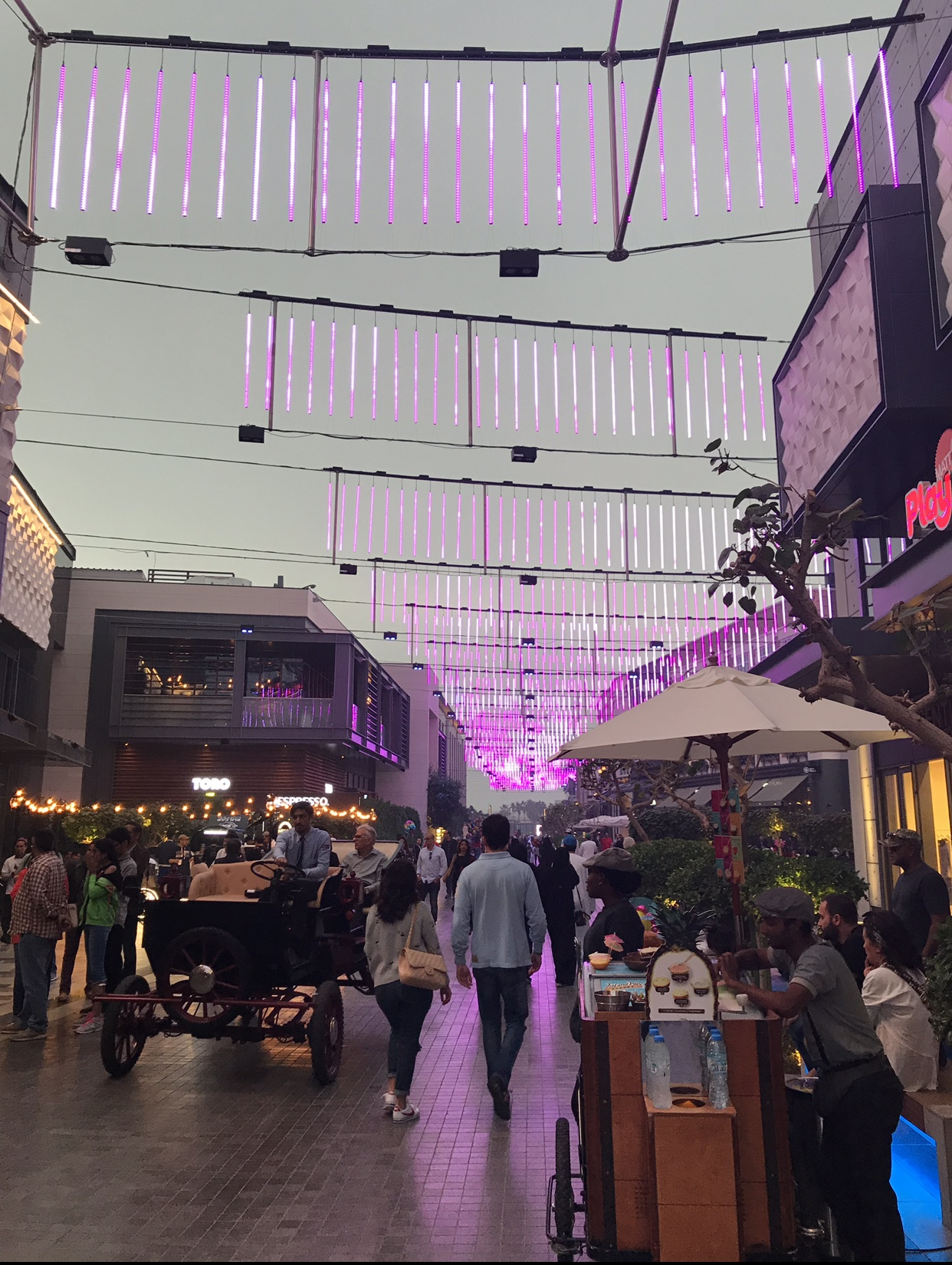
View in City Walk, Dubai

City Walk (aka City Walk Dubai) is an urban precinct in the Al Wasl Community of Dubai, United Arab Emirates, providing a partially pedestrianised shopping and leisure neighbourhood.

City Walk was opened to the public in February 2016.

Meraas is a major developer in the City Walk area. City Walk covers over 900,000 square meters of land, developed in two phases including commercial and residential areas, providing a destination for tourists. It is close to Al Safa Road, Al Wasl Road, and Sheikh Zayed Road.

In 2017, Sheikh Mohammed bin Rashid opened the smart police station in City Walk to provide 24-hour security services to workers and residents in the area. The center provides 46 security services that fall under 4 packages: criminal services, traffic services, community services, and certificates and permits services.

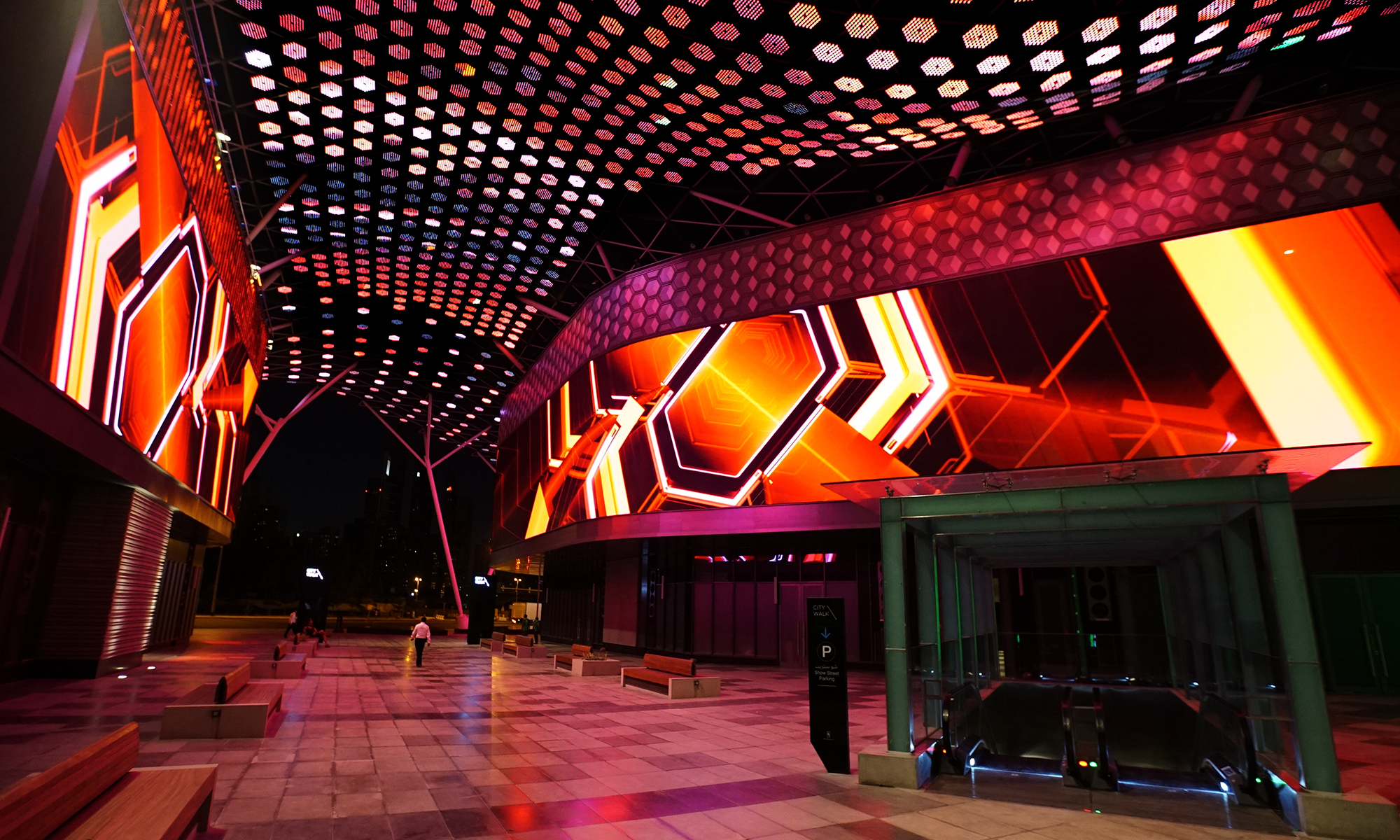
City Walk Meraas, 2017

== Attractions ==
- Coca-Cola Arena
- The Green Planet bio-dome
- Canadian University Dubai
