= Meraas Tower =

- برج مراس
- Former names: Burj Meraas; EP 15 Tower

General information
- Location: Jumeirah Garden City, Dubai, United Arab Emirates
- Construction started: 2009
- Opening: Never built

Height
- Antenna spire: ~550 m (1,804 ft)

Technical details
- Floor count: 112

Design and construction
- Architect: Adrian Smith + Gordon Gill Architecture
- Developer: Meraas

Meraas Tower was a proposed supertall skyscraper that was to be 550 m (1,804 ft) tall, and to be constructed in Jumeirah Garden City, Dubai. When completed it would have been one of the tallest skyscrapers in Dubai. The tower design had a series of faceted surfaces that would help light and air travel throughout the building. The faceted shapes were projected to maximize energy generation, balance natural light, and offer 360-degree views of the city below. They also would create natural atrium spaces as the building ascended, allowing the creation of naturally lit sky gardens. Exposing the intermediate floors would have made it seem as if the structure was composed of four smaller towers stacked one on top of another. Tower was to include 300,000 square meters of hotel, convention, commercial and retail spaces.

The tower was never built, and was canceled in 2009.

== See also ==
- List of tallest buildings in Dubai
- List of buildings with 100 floors or more
