= The Green Planet, Dubai =

Bio-dome in Dubai

The Green Planet
- الكوكب الأخضر (Arabic)

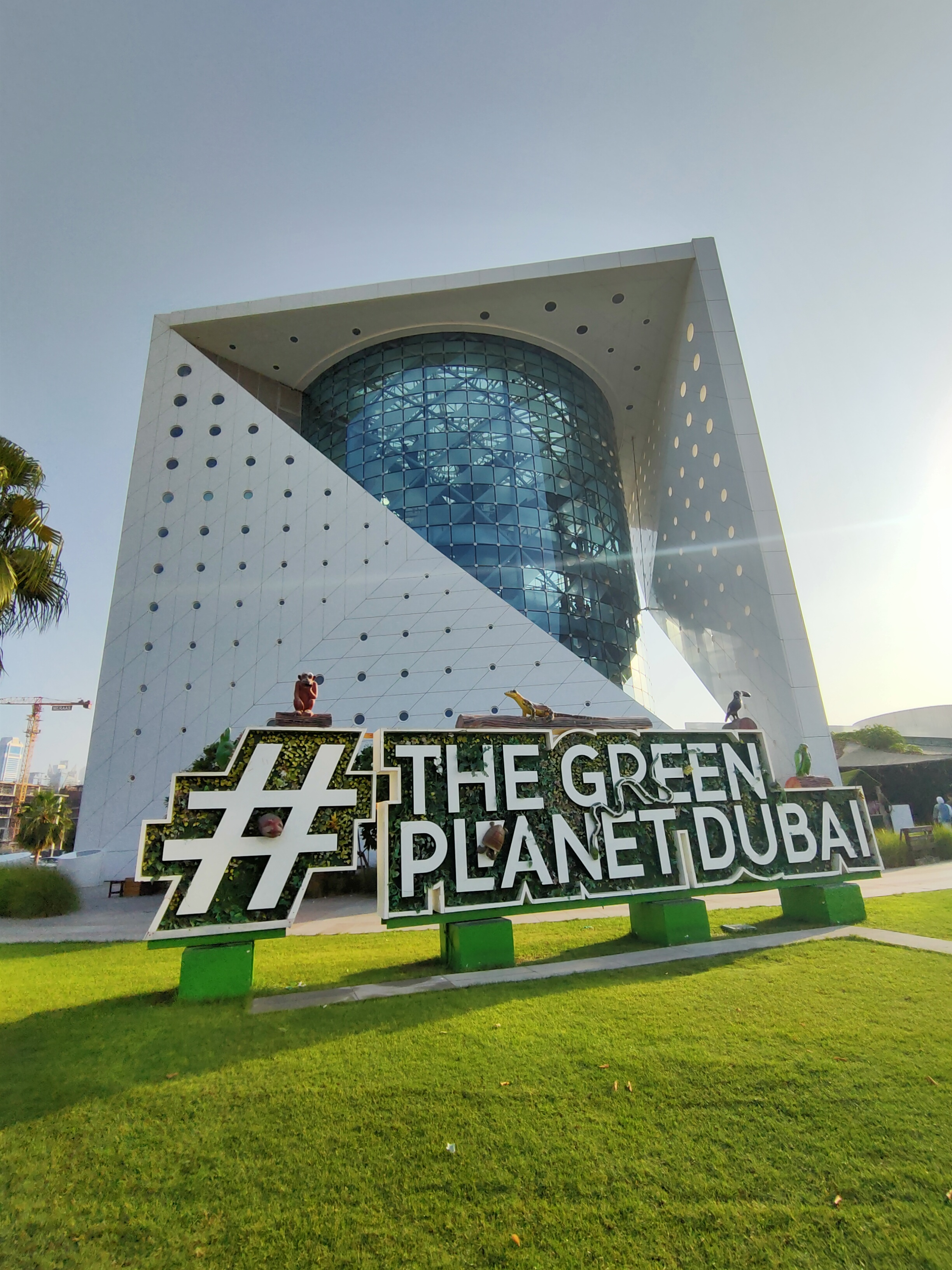
- View of the building with sign
- Interactive map of The Green Planet
- 25.20653°N 55.26063°E
- Date opened: 2016 September 1; 10 years ago
- Location: City Walk, Dubai, United Arab Emirates
- Floor space: 60,000 ft^{2}
- No. of animals: 3,000 plants and animals
- Management: Meraas
- Website: thegreenplanetdubai.com

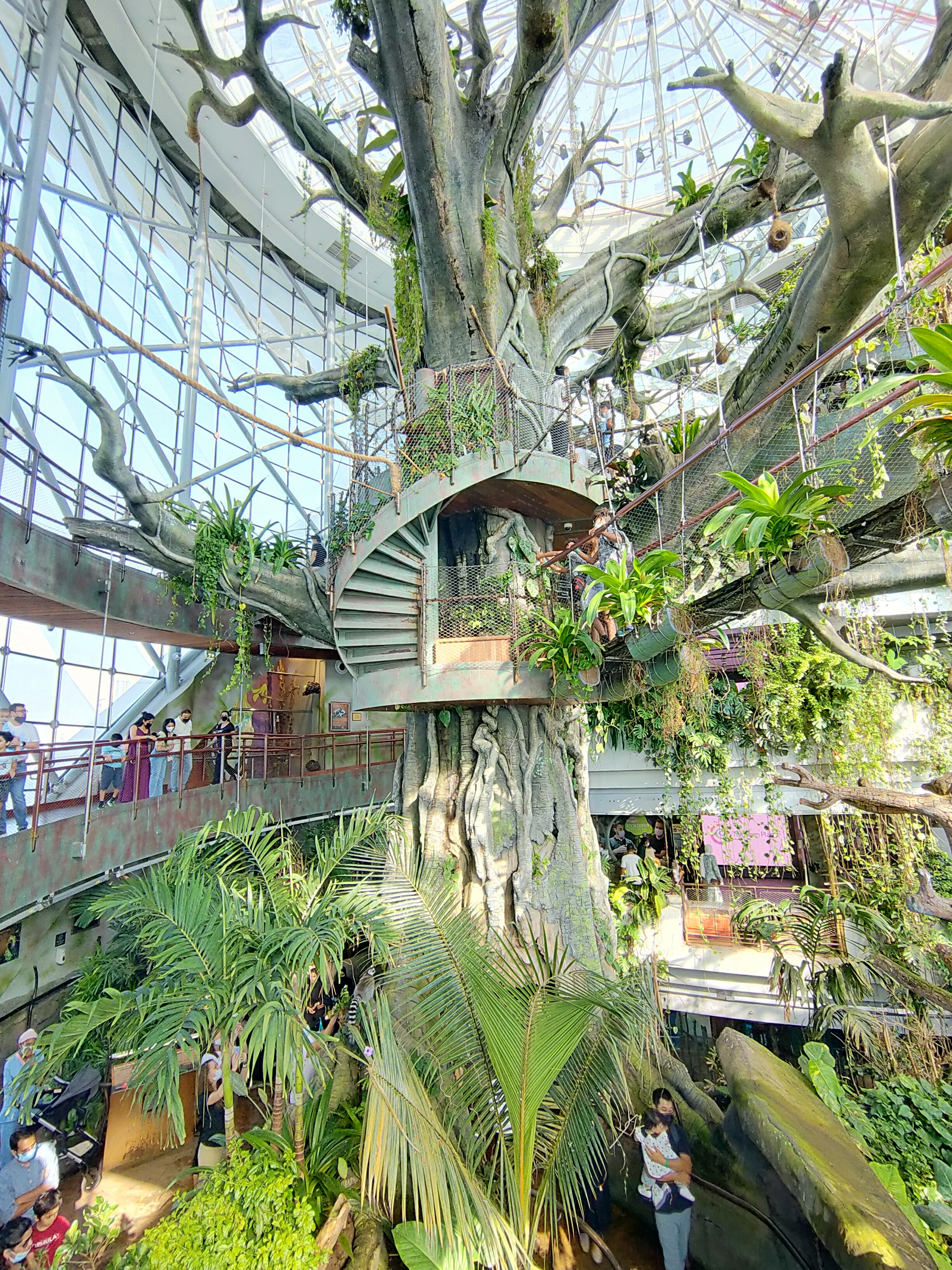
Artificial tree and bridge (right)

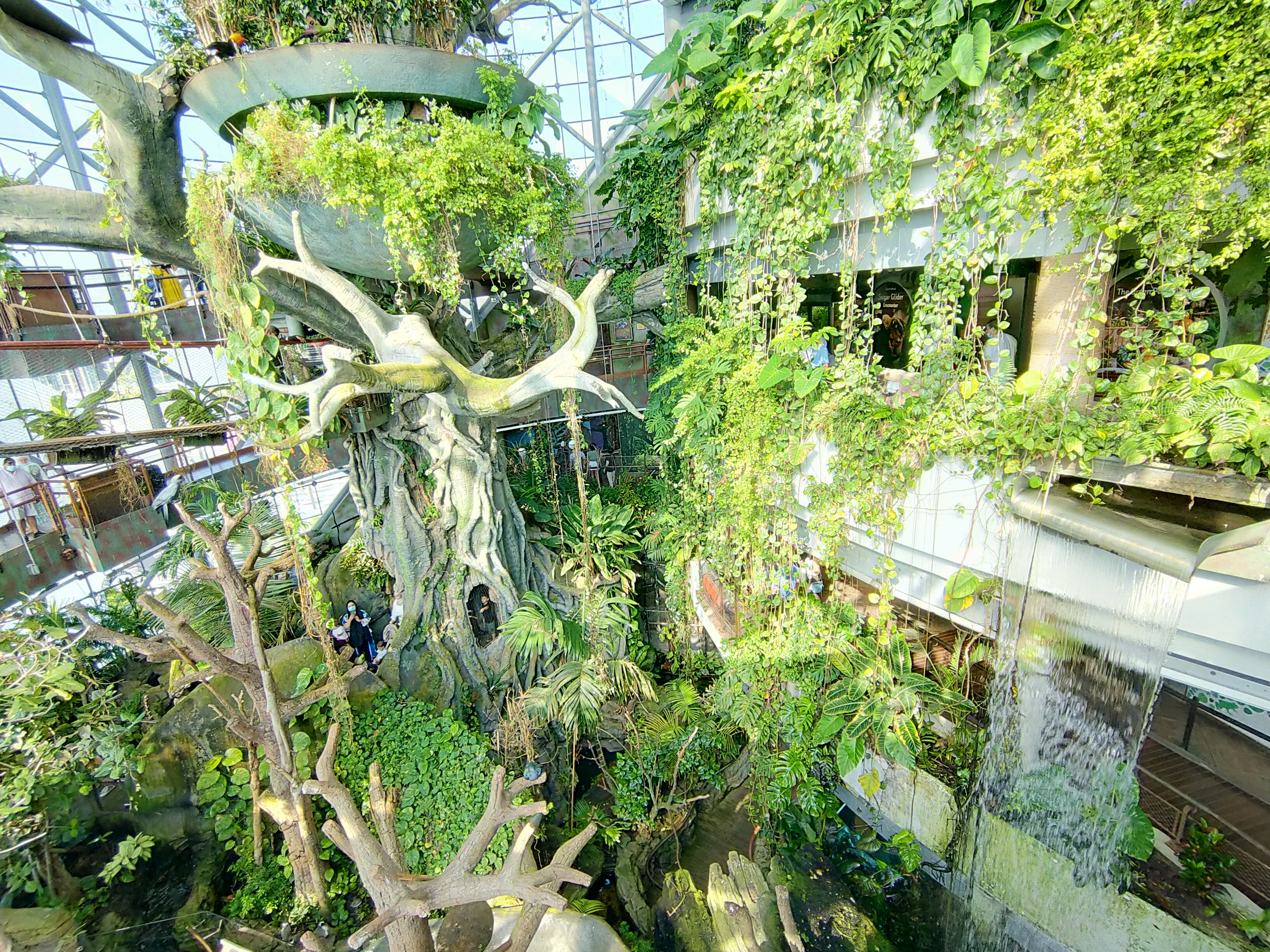
Tree and artificial waterfall (right)

The Green Planet (Arabic: الكوكب الأخضر) is an indoor zoo and garden in the City Walk area of Dubai, United Arab Emirates. It has over 3,000 plants and animals in its artificial "bio-dome" tropical rainforest including birds, reptiles, and fish. They are kept in open environments, but may not be touched.

The Green Planet indoor ecosystem was opened in 2016, with 3,000 plants and animals. The attraction was created by Meraas.

== Structure ==
The bio-dome is cube-shaped and was built as an expansion to CityWalk on Al Wasl Road. It is 60,000 square feet in area and the building's exterior is divided into two parts diagonally. One part is cylindrical with glass, while the other is covered with small circular apertures.

At the centre of the bio-dome, there is an 82-foot (25-meter) tall tree with an artificial trunk. A small bridge connects to the tree, which can only hold up to four people at a time. There is also an artificial waterfall. Visitors enter on the fourth floor via a lift and walk down using a spiral slope. In addition, there is a lift and stairs to access animals in the basement. Reptiles are on display at every level, with information about them. Green Planet is the region's first bio-dome which has recreated a tropical forest with its rich biodiversity of over 3,000 plants and animals. It has been certified with the global LEED (Leadership in Energy and Environmental Design) which is fully compliant with the Dubai Municipality green building regulations and specifications.

Animals on display include sloths, flying foxes, Seba bats, anaconda snakes, and a bearcat. It is possible for visitors to camp overnight at The Green Planet.

== See also ==
- List of tourist attractions in Dubai
