= Dubai Waterfront =

Unfinished waterfront in the United Arab Emirates

Coordinates: 24°57′20″N 54°54′34″E

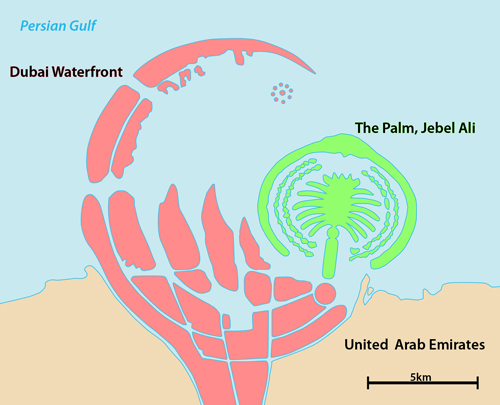
Red - Dubai Waterfront, Green - Palm Jebel Ali.

The Dubai Waterfront (now known as Waterfront; Arabic: واجهة دبي البحرية, romanized: wājiha Dubayy al-baḥriyya) was expected to become the largest waterfront and largest man-made development in the world. The project was a conglomeration of canals and artificial archipelago; it would occupy the last remaining Persian Gulf coastline of Dubai, the most populous emirate of the United Arab Emirates. It was planned to consist of a series of zones with mixed use including commercial, residential, resort, and amenity areas. The vision of the project was "to create a world-class destination for residents, visitors and businesses in the world's fastest growing city".

Run by the Dubai Waterfront Company, the project was open to foreign investment with its real estate developer, Nakheel Properties, owning a 51% stake.

Waterfront was being developed by Nakheel, one of the world's largest real estate developers. The artificial islands would be formed to resemble the most widely recognized symbol of Islam, the star and crescent. This would produce a shelter around the Palm Jebel Ali, one of the two completed Palm Islands, the largest artificial islands (shaped like palm trees) in the world also being constructed by Nakheel. It was later redesigned without the Islamic design, and due to the 2008 financial crisis, the project was stalled. With 40% of the islands already constructed, the project was cancelled.

== Geography ==
Waterfront was planned to add more than 70 kilometres to Dubai's coastline and encompass an area of 130,000,000 square metres (1.4×10^{9} sq ft) of water and land developments. It was expected to house an estimated population of 1.5 million people.

Located near the Al Maktoum International Airport, and with direct access to Sheikh Zayed Road, Jebel Ali Freezone, and Abu Dhabi, the city would have been accessible on a local and international scale.

The development hub would be along the shoreline, stretching in-land to offer a range of residences, commercial districts and industrial areas, with several major tourist attractions and leisure amenities. Extending from the coastline into the Persian Gulf would be a series of connected islands featuring villas and high-end accommodations.

=== Sections ===
The plan consists of 10 key areas including Madinat Al Arab, expected to become Dubai's new downtown and central business district. Madinat Al Arab was developed by an international consortium of architects, planners and urban developers featuring resorts, retail, commercial spaces, public spaces, a broad mix of residencies and an integrated transport system including light rail and a road network. It was also to feature a 1-kilometre tall skyscraper named Burj Madinat Al Arab, however, the tower project was subsequently cancelled.

Other key zones included Al Ras, Corniche, The Riviera, The Palm Boulevard, The Peninsula, Uptown, Downtown, Boulevard, and The Exchange.

== History ==
Major civil works and infrastructure commenced on the first phase of Madinat Al Arab. Construction of the 8.0 kilometer Palm Cove Canal, which runs parallel to the coastline, began in February 2007 and was more than 65 per cent complete before the project was suspended.

The first phase of Madinat Al Arab (30%) was unveiled to private property and investment institutions from the United Arab Emirates and Cooperation Council for the Arab States of the Gulf in July 2005. Within five days, it had been completely sold out, for over 13 billion AED.

=== Suspension ===
The Waterfront project stalled with the onset of the Great Recession and Dubai World's debt crisis in 2009. Nakheel was forced to restructure over $11bn of debt and scale back many of its projects. In December 2011 Nakheel advertised for sale 13 unused construction cranes intended for use in the Waterfront project. Nakheel has announced its intention to develop the first phase of the Veneto and Badrah neighbourhoods and associated infrastructure of certain phases of the Madinat Al Arab in the near-term, while other parts of the waterfront have been suspended until demand improves. However, the islands have since been abandoned with only 2 islands partially completed.

== See also ==
- Dubai Marina
- Tourism in Dubai
- The World
- Arabian Canal
