= Safa Park =

Park in Dubai

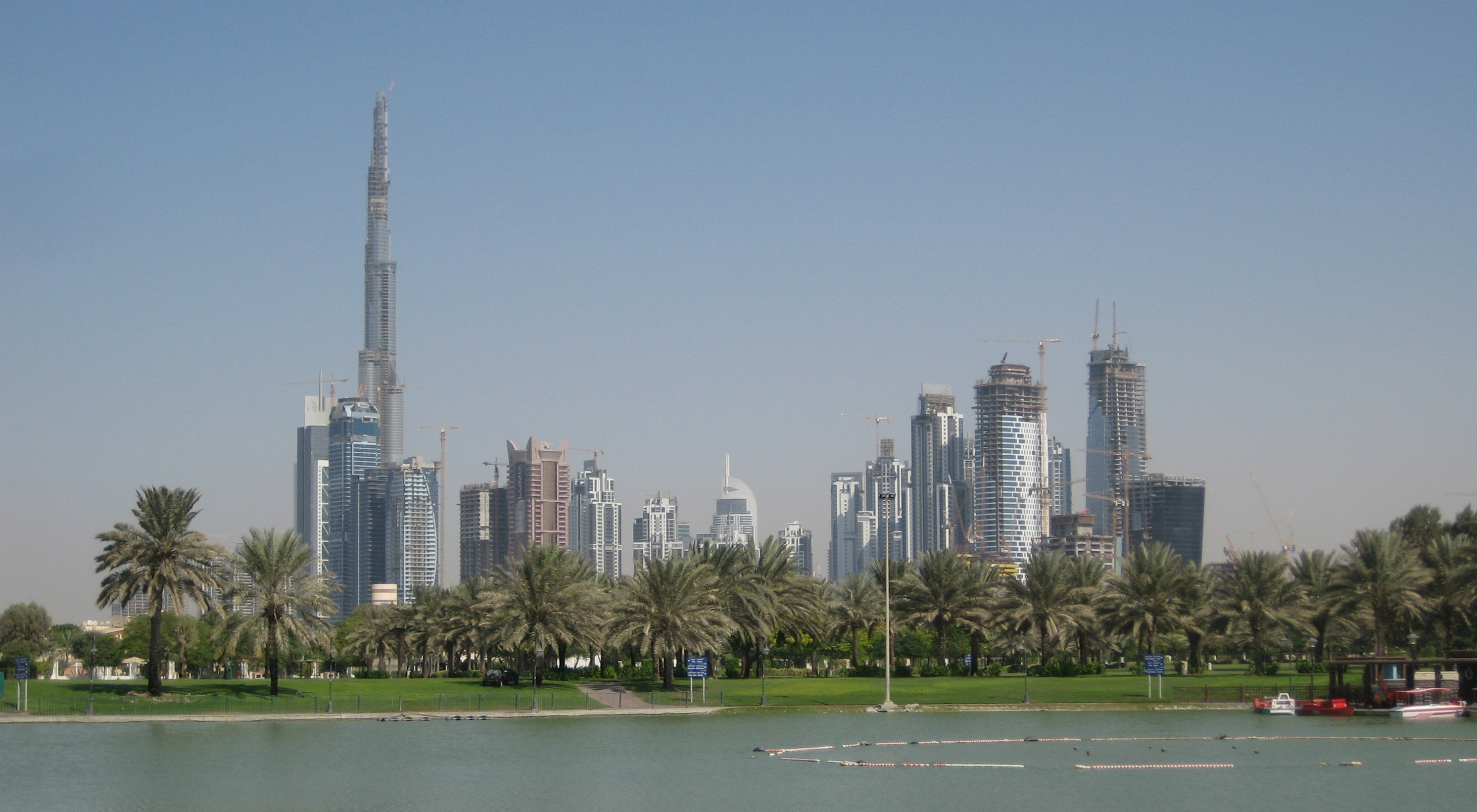
- Safa Park, with Burj Khalifa (then still under construction) and Business Bay in the background
- Interactive map of Safa Park
- Type: Municipal
- Location: Dubai
- Coordinates: 25°11′08″N 55°14′50″E
- Area: 158.148 acres (0.640 km^{2}; 0.247 sq mi; 64.000 ha)
- Created: 1975
- Operator: Dubai Municipality: Dubai Public Parks
- Status: Open all year from 8 AM to 11 PM

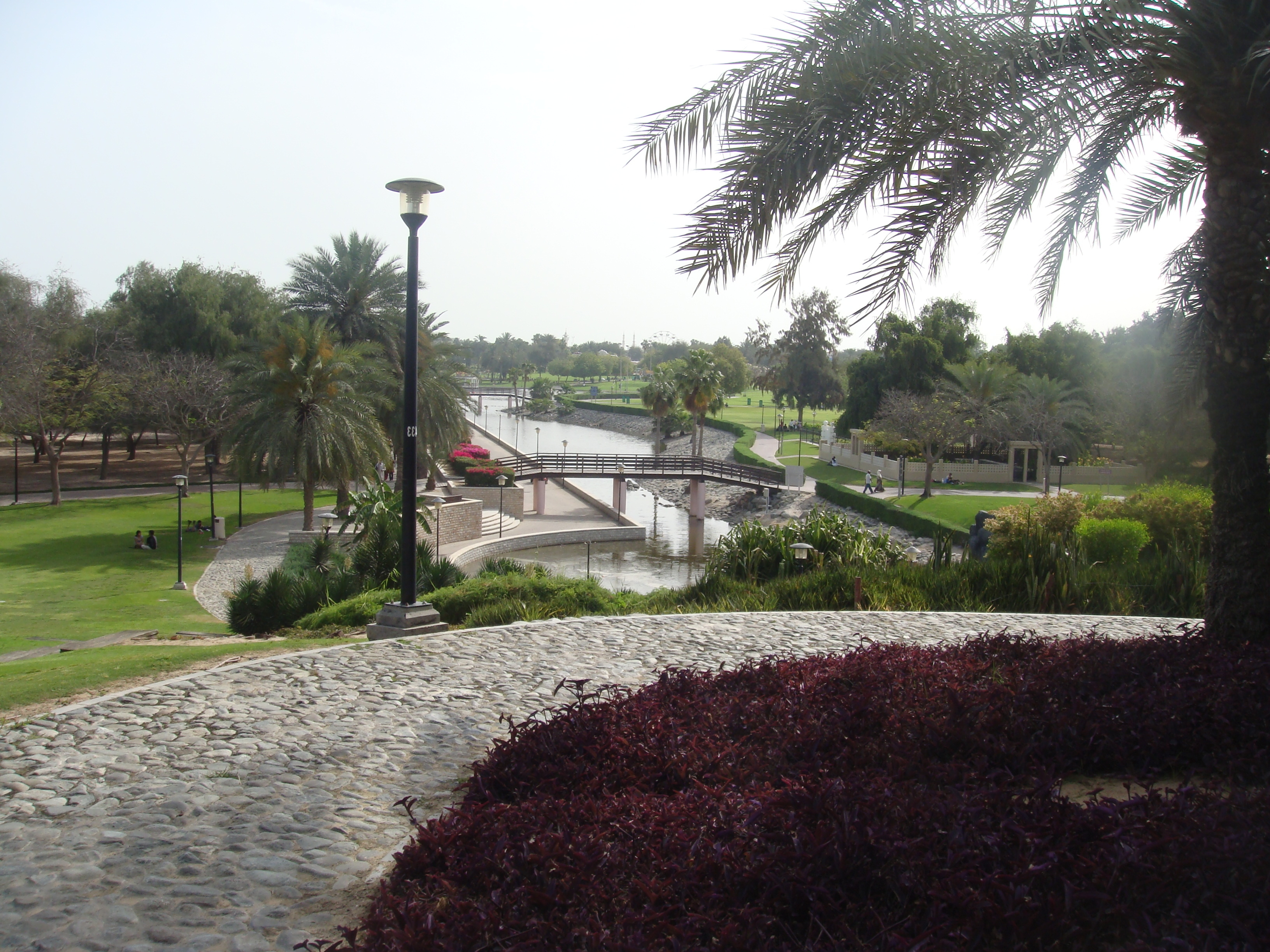
Hadiqat es-Safa park

Safa Park (in Arabic: حديقة الصفا) is a 64 hectares (158.147 acres) urban park located in Dubai, United Arab Emirates. It is 10.53 km (6.54 mi) southwest of the traditional center of Dubai along Sheikh Zayed Road. The park is bordered by Sheikh Zayed Road, Al Wasl Road, Al Hadiqa Street, and 55th Street.

Approximately half of the park was demolished in 2014 to create space for the Dubai Canal project.

== History of Safa Park ==
Created in 1975, Safa Park was located on the outskirts of Dubai. Prior to its creation, the area was inhabited by illegal immigrants from South Asia. They lived in makeshift homes without running water. The Dubai government [Mohammed bin Rashid Al Maktoum] tolerated these illegal immigrants due to the need for their labor. The immigrants were later given amnesty and expelled from the immediate area for the creation of the park.

== Development of Safa Park ==
After being a destination for Dubai's residents for nine years, the park went under redevelopment in 1984. Another redevelopment occurred between 1989 and 1992. The first redevelopment included the addition of sanitary utilities and an indoor playground. The latter development delivered recreational and service facilities to the park. Today Safa Park is almost in the center of the city and only 3.05 km (1.90 mi) from the Burj Khalifa, 5.06 km (3.14 mi) from the Emirates Towers, and 6.27 km (3.90 mi) from the Dubai World Trade Centre. Due to Dubai's rapid growth, skyscrapers are now approaching the park's doorstep.

In 2014, the northeastern half of the park was fenced off and demolished, as part of the land clearance for the Dubai Water Canal project. Construction around the canal was still ongoing as of 2024, with the park's northeast edge fenced off from the canal.

== Flora and Fauna of Safa Park ==
The park contains three lakes, over 200 species of birds, and 16,924 different trees and bushes. Within the park, is grass (which covers around 80% of the park), a small forest, and a hill. A waterfall flows out of the hill and into a nearby lake. There are four entrances to the park, all from nearby roads.

== Dubai Fitness Challenge ==
Dubai Fitness challenge was inaugurated by Dubai Crown prince at time Shaikh Hamdan bin Mohammad bin Rashid Al Maktoum. This fitness challenge lasted for one month and started on October 20, 2017. The challenge end on 18 November 2017. The park was closed for one week before challenge for preparation and renovation of park.

== Sports in Safa Park ==
The park has sports activities like Long tennis, Cycling, Football and Volleyball.

== Flea Market ==
A Flea Market is open every first Saturday of the month in Safa Park. It a popular space where one can sell unusable items to other people who have use for them.

== See also ==
- List of parks in Dubai
