= Mushrif Park =

Park in Dubai

- حديقة مشرف
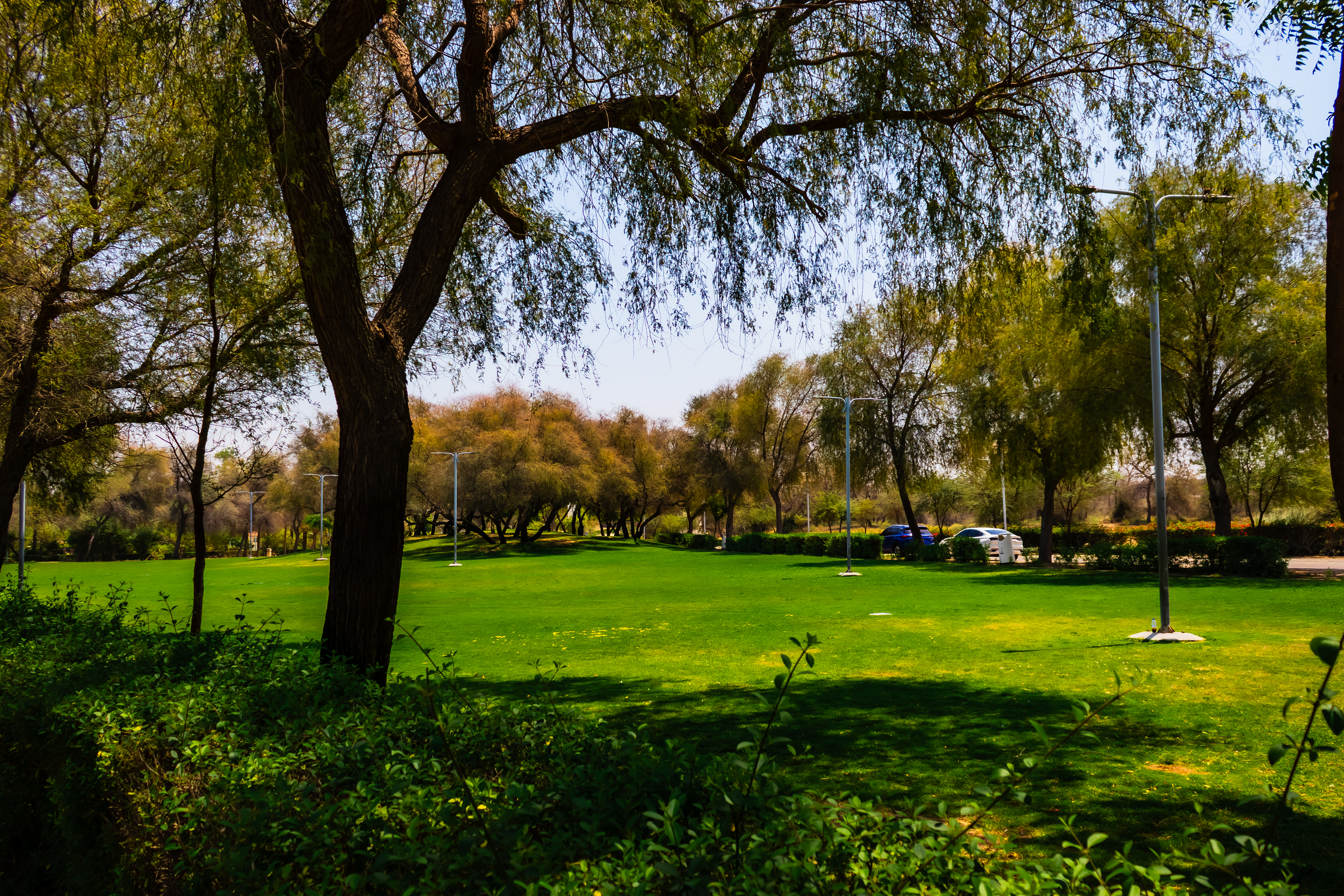
- View in the park
- Interactive map of Mushrif Park
- Type: Municipal
- Location: Dubai, United Arab Emirates
- Coordinates: 25°13′10″N 55°27′02″E
- Area: 525 hectares (1,297 acres)
- Created: 1982
- Operator: Dubai Municipality: Dubai Public Parks
- Status: All year

Mushrif Park (Arabic: حديقة مشرف, aka Mushrif National Park) is a family-oriented park in Dubai, United Arab Emirates. It is located in the eastern part of the city (near the suburb of Al Khawaneej), about 16 km (10 mi) from the traditional center of Dubai. The park was created in 1982 by Dubai Municipality and was widely expanded and refurbished in 1989. Facilities include a swimming pool, a bicycle track, electronic games, football fields, theater screenings, excursion and barbeque services.

The park has 13 models of traditional houses in styles from around the world, forming a small "International Village". There is also an Adventura Parks adventure course in the trees, including a zipline. There is a botanical garden where bird watching is possible. The Dubai Crocodile Park zoo is located in the south of the park. There is also a 10-km hiking trail.

The entry fee to Mushrif Park is 10 dirhams per car. The park is open daily from 8:00 AM to 11:00 PM.

To the north is Al Mizhar 2, to the east is Al Khawaneej, to the south is Al Warqa 4, and to the west is Mirdif. The park is located near Dubai International Airport, which has promoted the hobby of aircraft spotting in the region. Close to the park is Mushrif Village in Mirdif.

The area is also known as Al Musrif or Al Mushraif.

== See also ==
- List of parks in Dubai
