= Dubai Canal =

Waterway in Dubai, United Arab Emirates

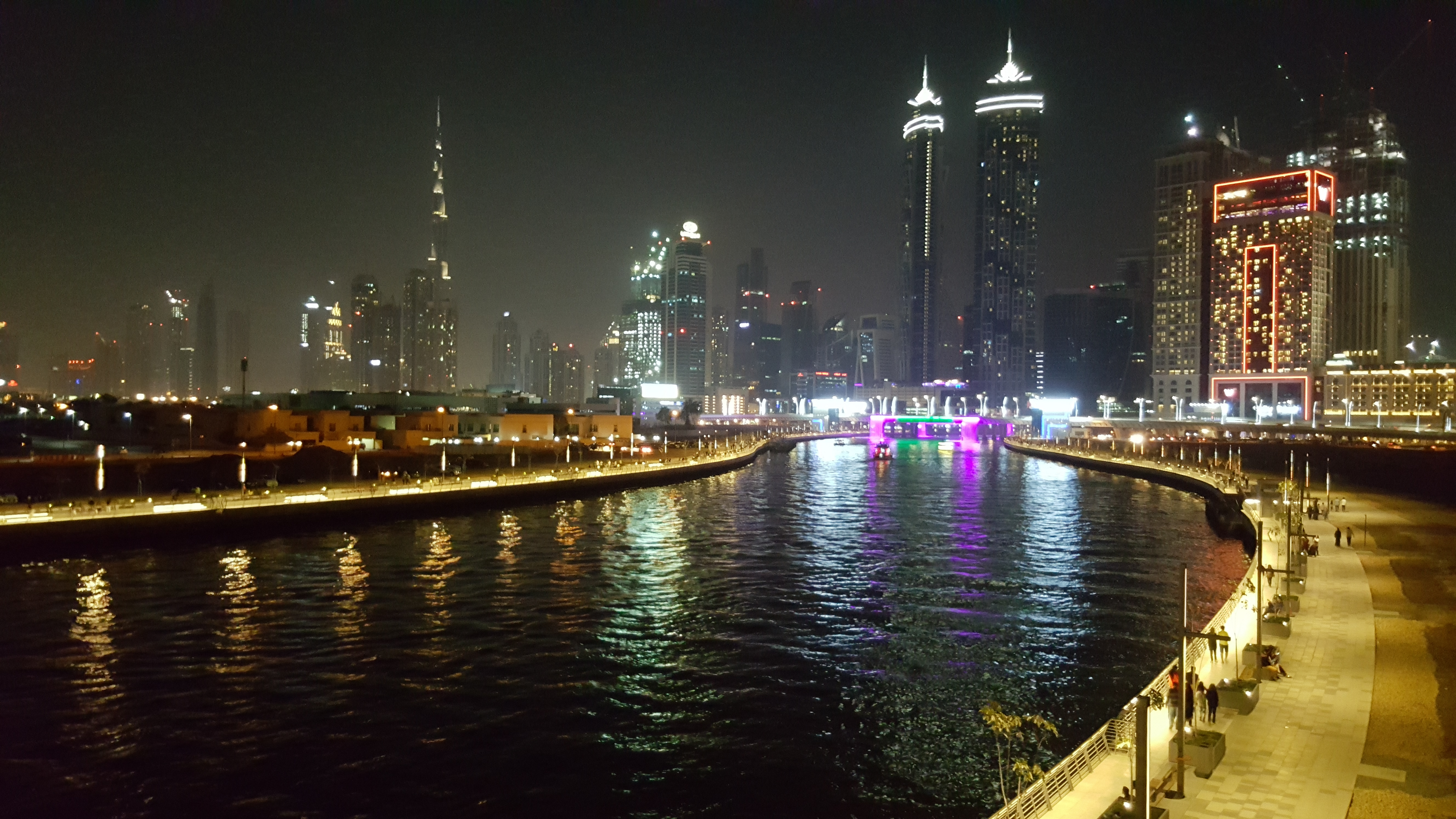
- Dubai Canal – a night view
- Interactive map of Dubai Canal

Specifications
- Length: 3.2 km (2.0 mi)
- Maximum boat length: 32 m (105 ft)

History
- Construction began: 2013
- Date completed: 2016

Geography
- Beginning coordinates: 25.2033°N 55.3271°E
- Ending coordinates: 25.1963°N 55.2332°E

Dubai Canal is an artificial water canal unveiled on 2 October 2013 and inaugurated on 9 November 2016. The canal sidewalk comprises one shopping centre, four hotels, 450 restaurants, luxury housing, walkways and cycle paths. It is a 3.2 km (2.0 mi) long project starting from Business Bay into the Persian Gulf through Safa Park and Jumeirah west of the Indian Ocean. The width ranges from 80 m (260 ft) to 120 m (390 ft). It is 6 m (20 ft) feet deep and be crossed by 8 m (26 ft) high bridges. It creates new public places and facilities with a total area of 80,000 m^{2} (860,000 sq ft) with private marinas for boats and a trade centre at the entrance of the canal. The development was designed by AE7 Architects and Planners.

Built by BESIX Group subsidiary Six Construct, the canal is crossed by 3 pedestrian/bicycle bridges, including the Dubai Water Canal Bridge, better known as the Twisted Bridge and now renamed Bridge of Tolerance, so named by His Highness Shaikh Mohammad Bin Rashid Al Maktoum, Vice-President and Prime Minister of the UAE and Ruler of Dubai on November 15, 2017.

== Infrastructure ==
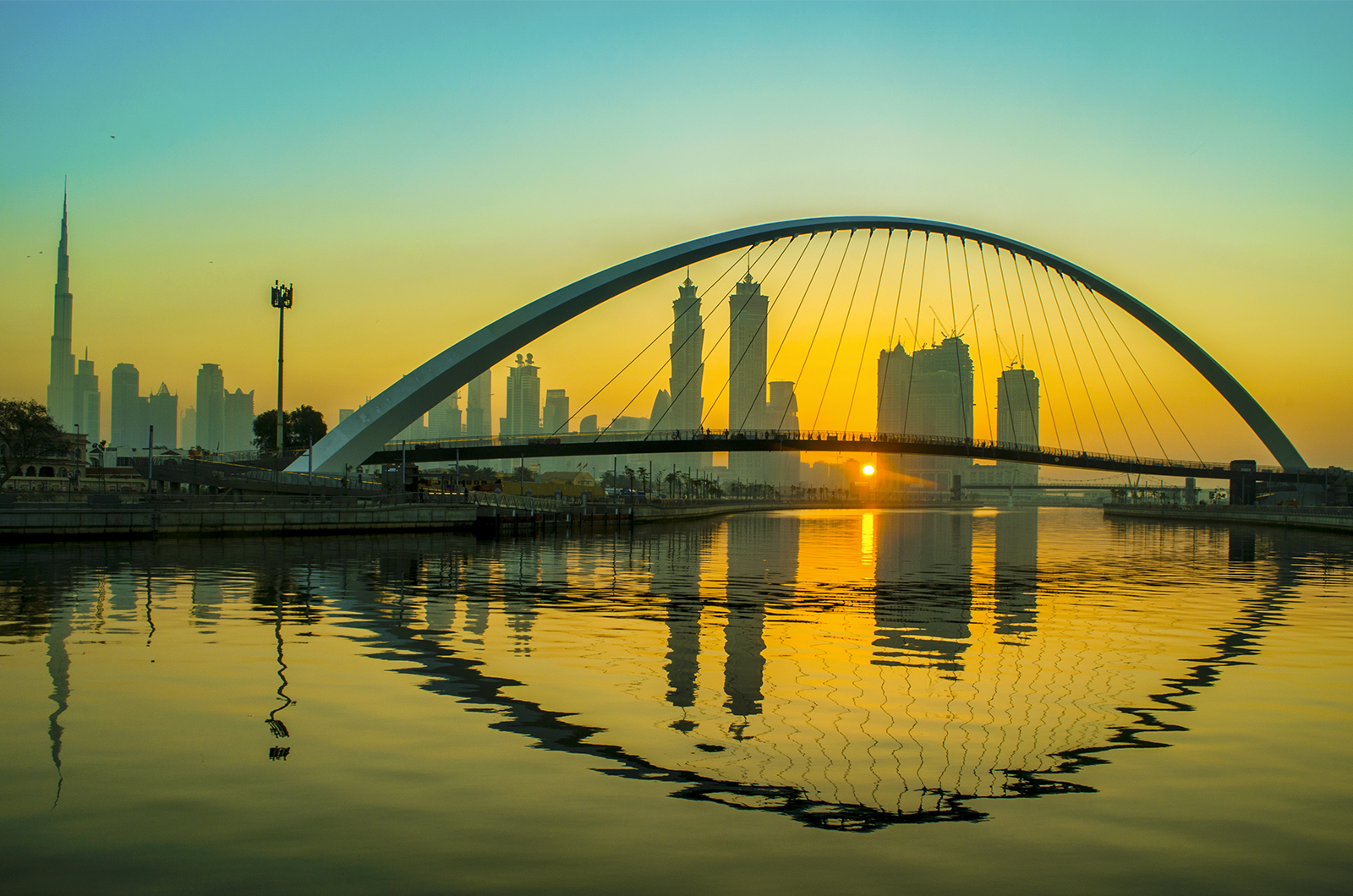
Tolerance Bridge over Dubai canal

Roads and Transport Authority (RTA) built bridges over the canal for Sheikh Zayed Road, Al Wasl Road and Jumeirah Road. The Sheikh Zayed road bridge has eight lanes in each direction and three lanes in each direction on Al Wasl Road and Jumeirah Road. The crossings are 8.5 meters above the water to allow boats to pass underneath. Dubai Water Canal was built by dredging the canal bed up to six metres and removing more than 3.2 million cubic metres of soil. Around 15,000 concrete blocks were used to build and fortify the banks – each weighing 40 tons. It has taken over the areas of Dubai like Al Satwa, Downtown, Zabeel, Oud Metha, Karama and Bur Dubai into one huge island which has become completely water locked.

The project also includes three pedestrian crossings in addition to footpaths on all three new bridges and four marina stations for public transport.

As of July 2014, the earthworks for the project near Sheikh Zayed Road had commenced.

It was unveiled on 2 October 2013 and inaugurated on 9 November 2016. The canal and its bridges were built between 2014 and 2016 by BESIX subsidiary Six Construct.

One of the first projects launched on Dubai Water Canal is Marasi Business Bay, which broke ground in June 2017.
