= Elphinstone Inlet =

Fjord in Oman

Coordinates: 26°12′30″N 56°21′00″E

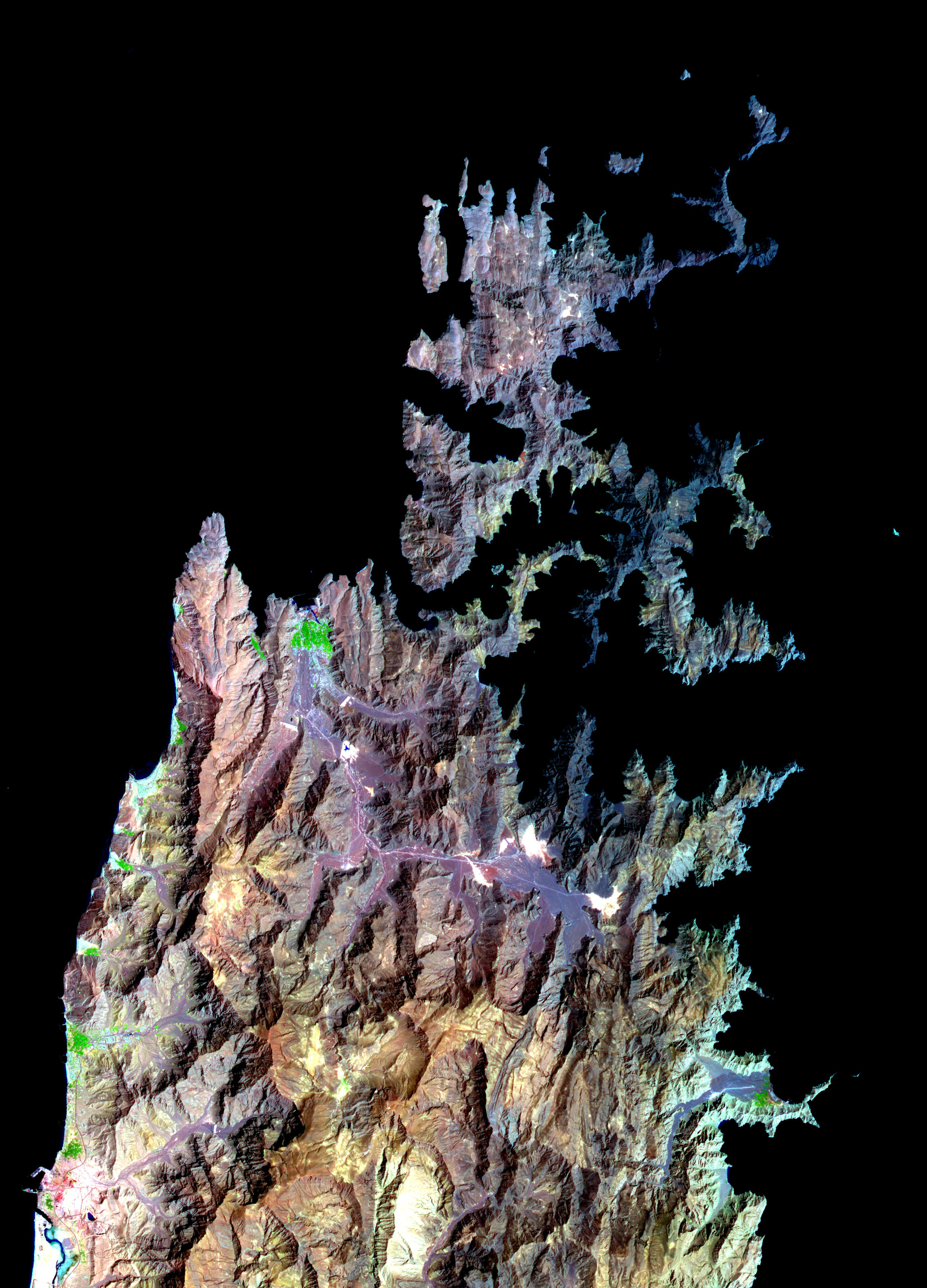
Musandam Peninsula showing the Elphinstone Inlet

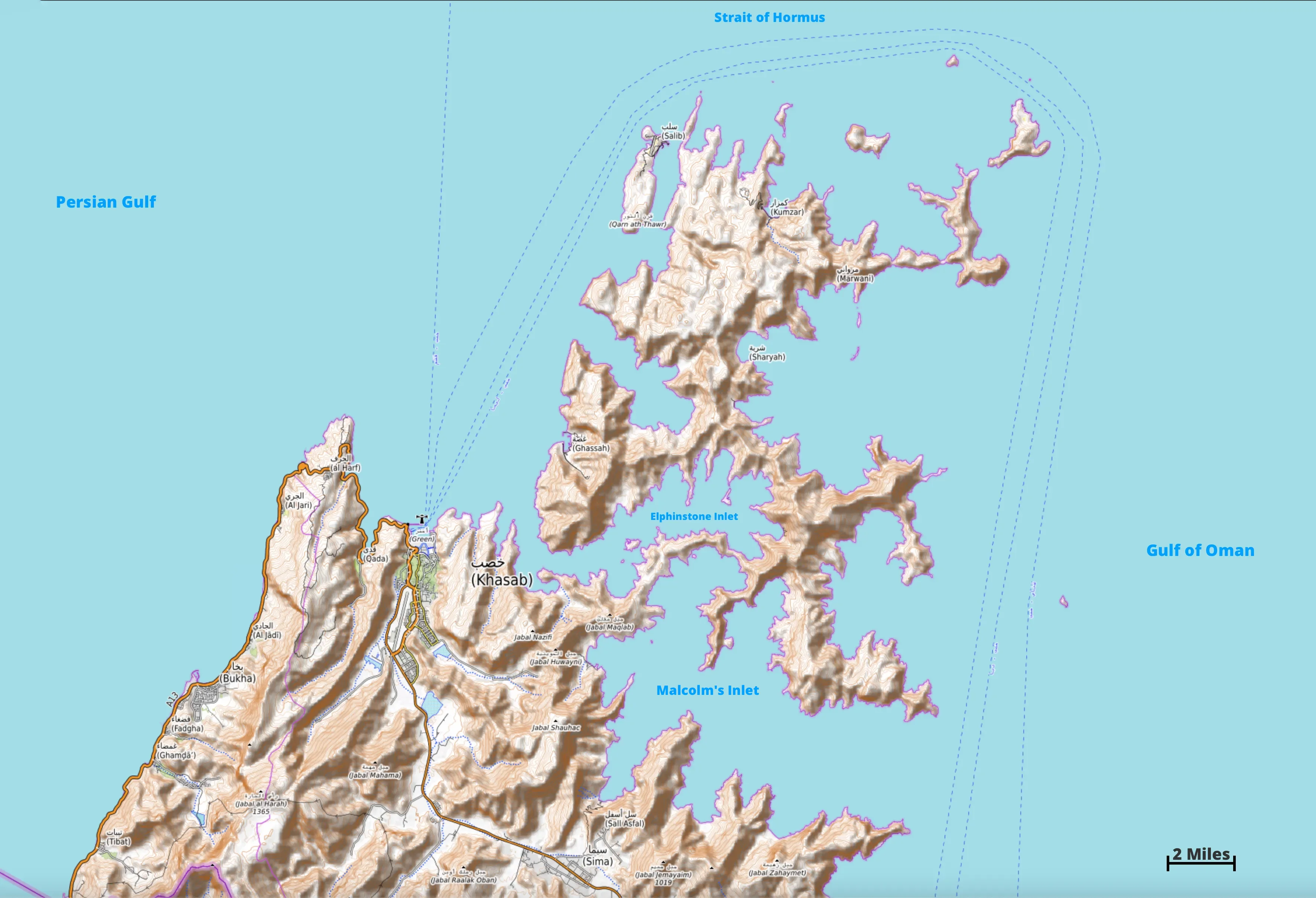
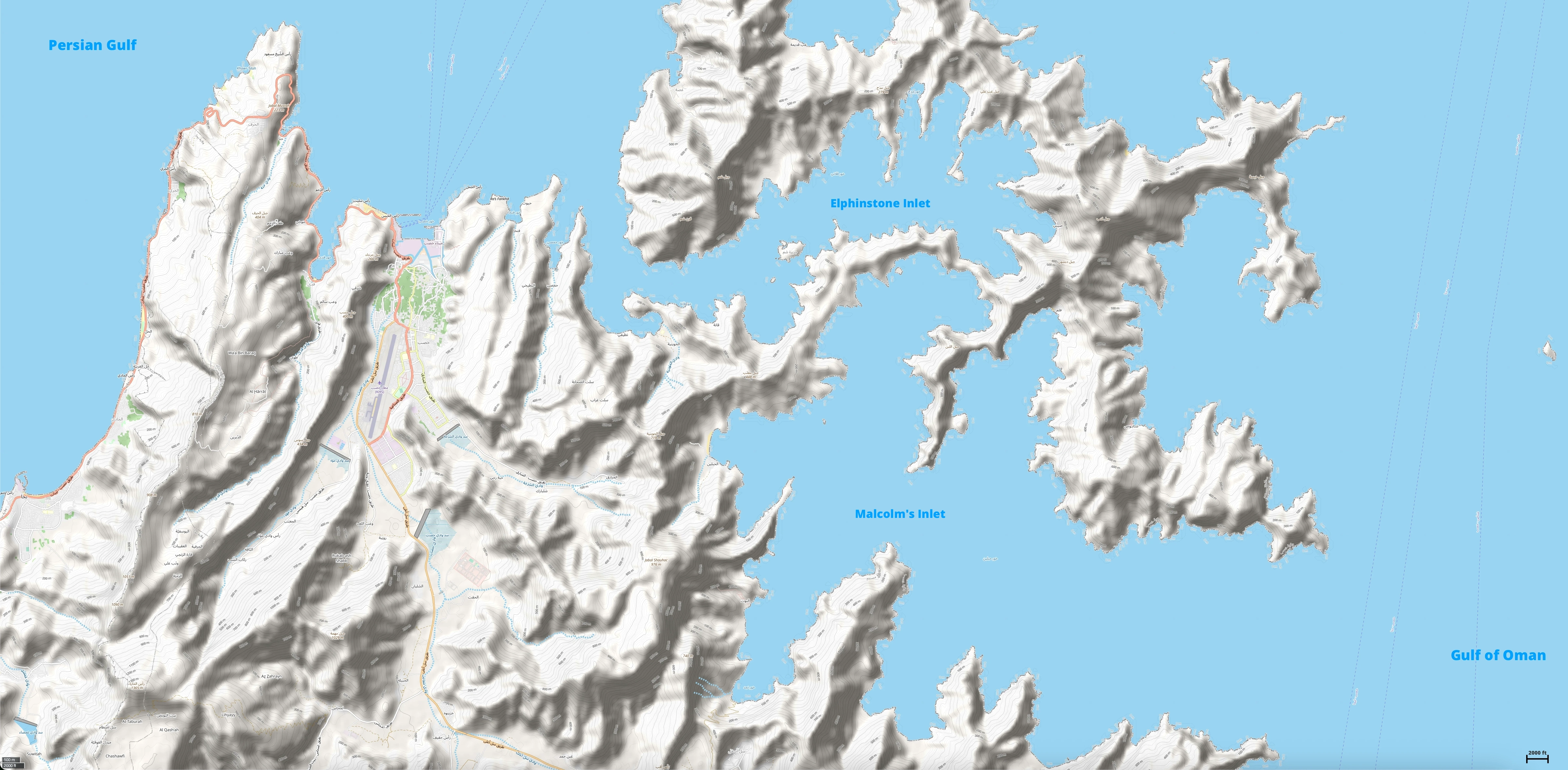
Topographic maps of the Elphinstone Inlet and Malcolm's Inlet
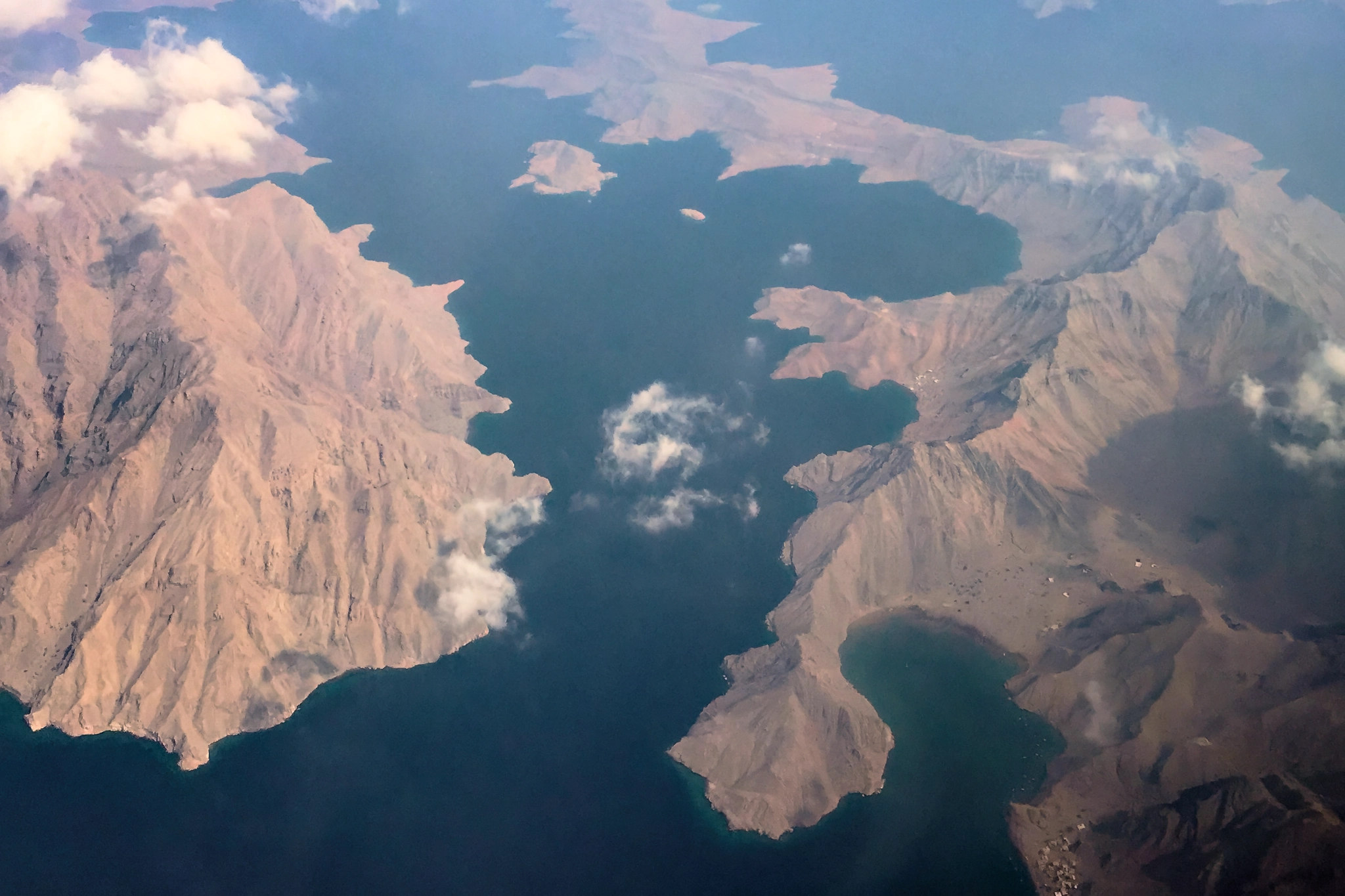
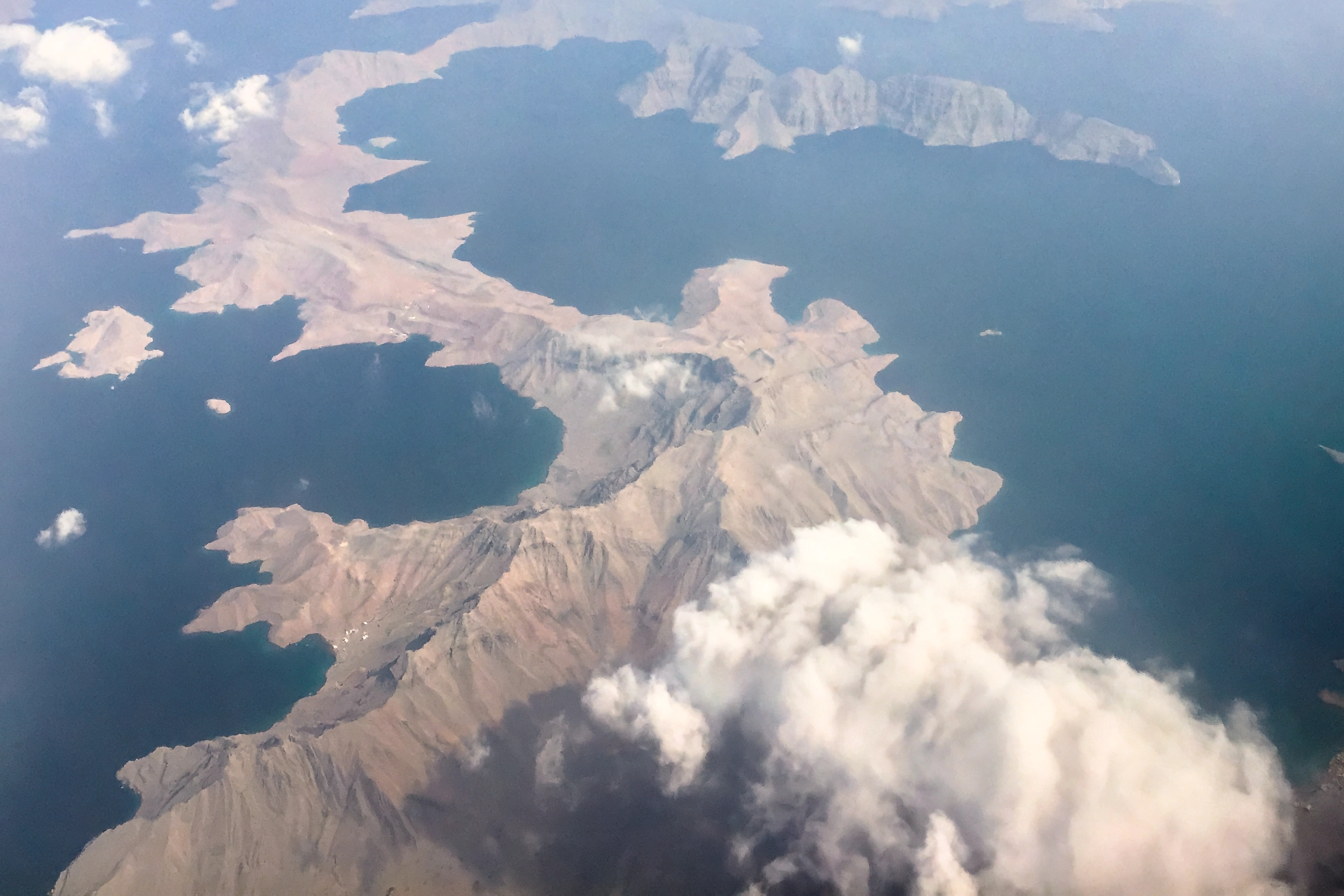
Elphinstone Inlet and Malcolm's inlet separated by a small strip of land on the Musandam Peninsula

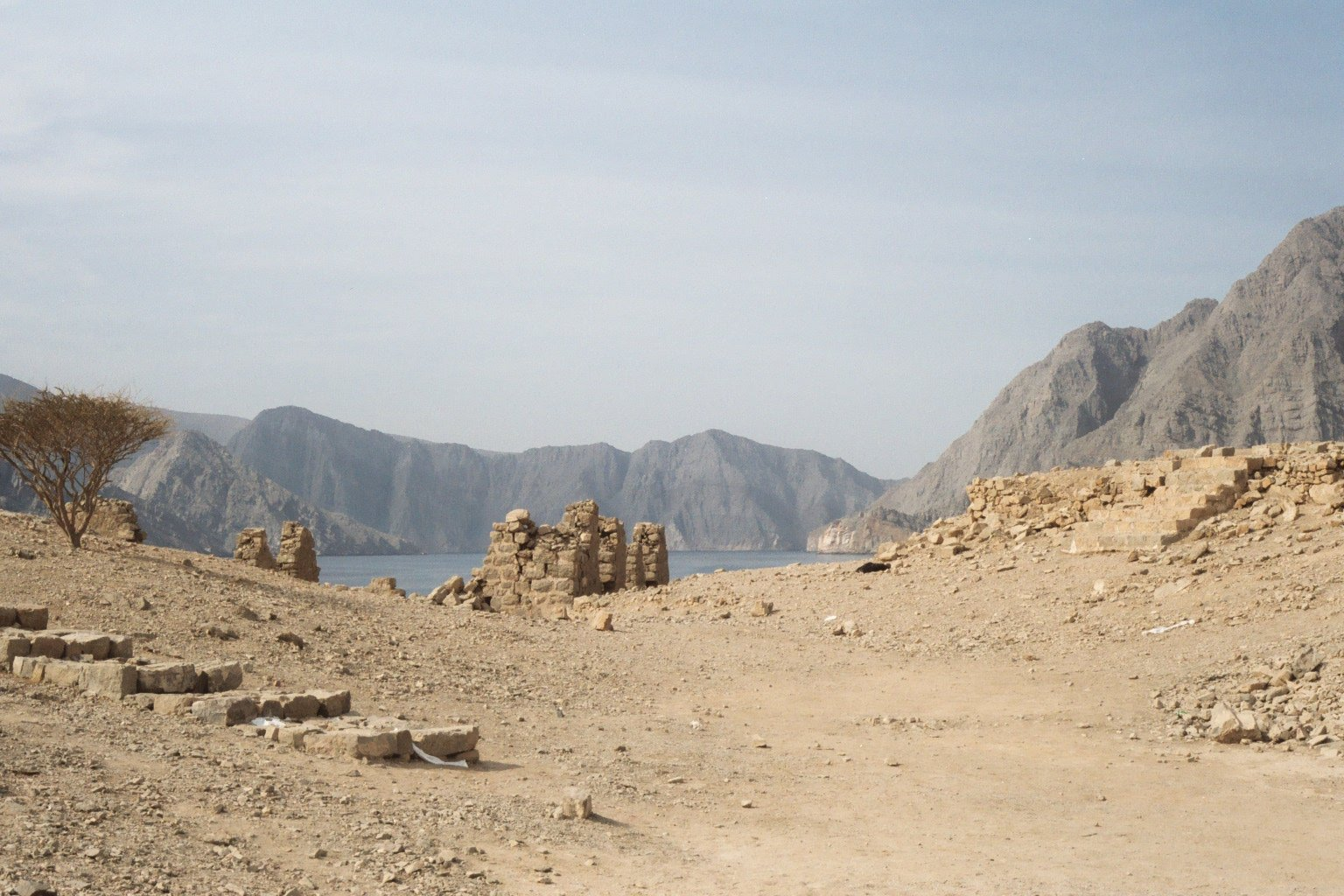
Telegraph Island, located in the Elphinstone Inlet

The Elphinstone Inlet, or Khor ash Sham (Arabic: خور الشم), is an inlet in the Musandam Peninsula of Oman. It was named for the then–Governor of Bombay, Mountstuart Elphinstone, by the British survey team that mapped it in 1820.

The inlet is accessed only by the Persian Gulf. It is visited by tourists on dhows from Khasab, the main town in Musandam. It was formed by the subduction of the Arabian tectonic plate beneath the Eurasian plate.

== History ==
The population of the Musandam Peninsula, also known as the Ruus Al Jibal, has long been dominated by the Shihuh and a number of affiliated tribes (such as the Habus and Tunaij) and is mainly today covered by the Omani Musandam Governorate.

Historically, the territory was considered Qawasim but the independently minded Shihuh were difficult to govern and their principal northern villages were often secessionist, depending on the inaccessibility of the terrain they inhabited. In the nineteenth century, the Shihuh were frequently in conflict with the Al Qasimi of both Sharjah and Ras Al Khaimah and were more ready to accept the Suzerainty of Muscat, leading the Musandam to be generally recognised as Omani territory by the early 20th century.

=== Survey ===
The British Nautical Survey of the southeast Arabian coast was undertaken in 1820, following the 1819 punitive expedition mounted against the Qawasim by the British East India Company supported by the Royal Navy that led to the General Maritime Treaty of 1820 signed between the British and a number of what would become known as the Trucial States (today the United Arab Emirates). The survey was commissioned by the Governor of Bombay, Mounstuart Elphinstone. Following a long diplomatic career, in 1819, Elphinstone was appointed Lieutenant-Governor of Bombay, and remained in this post until 1827, when he retired to England.

The survey's principal aim was to reconnoitre the coast of the Trucial States, Oman and the islands of the Straits of Hormuz to aid navigation for British shipping in the area, but also to discover hiding places used by the Qawasim and other maritime forces that had long been harrying Omani and other native shipping. While British chroniclers at the time frequently referred to these raids as acts of maritime piracy (and used the phrase 'Pirate Coast' to describe the area), contemporary historians point to these raids forming an element of the state of war existing between the Qawasim and the Sultan of Muscat, Said bin Sultan Al Busaidi. Allied to Muscat, the British were to find themselves caught between the two regional forces.

== Geography ==
The inlet is some 16 kilometres (9.9 miles) long and surrounded by fjord-like passages 1,000 to 1,250 m (3,280 to 4,100 ft) high. Situated at the edge of the Arabian tectonic plate, where the plate subducts beneath the Eurasian plate, Musandam is being pushed downwards at approximately 6 mm (0.24 in) per year at its northernmost point. Although stories told locally of sailors diving into the sea to collect fresh water in leather bags have been ascribed to the unique geology of the area, undersea springs are common throughout the coast, fed by aquifers from the mountains.

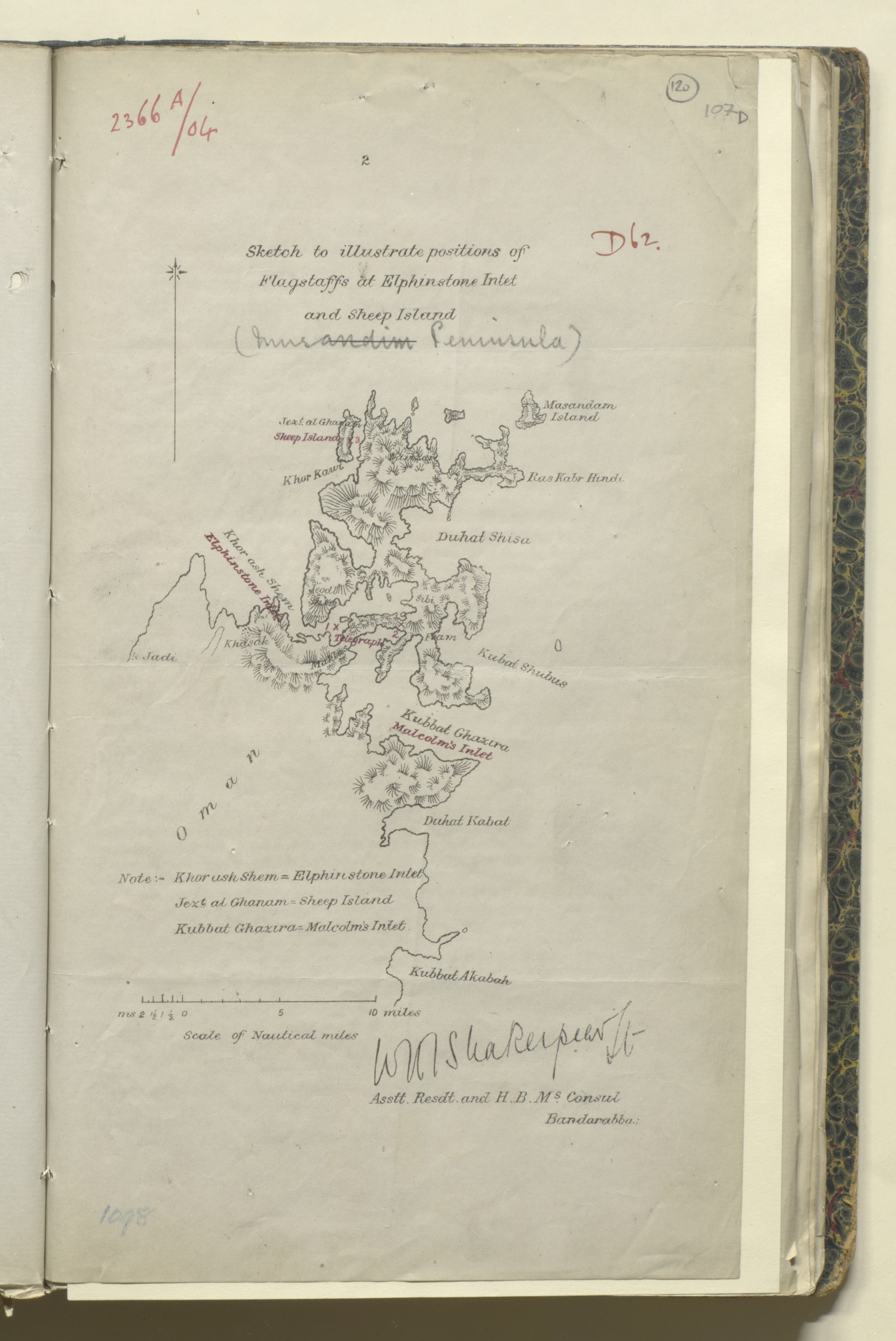
British map of the Elphinstone Inlet

The entrance to the Inlet is under one kilometre wide and difficult to detect from seaward, making it an ideal hiding place for local sailors in the early 19th century, evading their British pursuers who "saw with amazement the enemy suddenly disappearing from the scene as if by magic". Beyond the entrance is the village of Sham and a large island bearing the same name.

The Elphinstone Group is a grouping of five rock outcrops, predominantly limestone and sandstone with occasional dolomite, identified by geologists working for the Iraq Petroleum Group in 1959, three of which are designated within the Ghalilah formation.

== Telegraph station ==
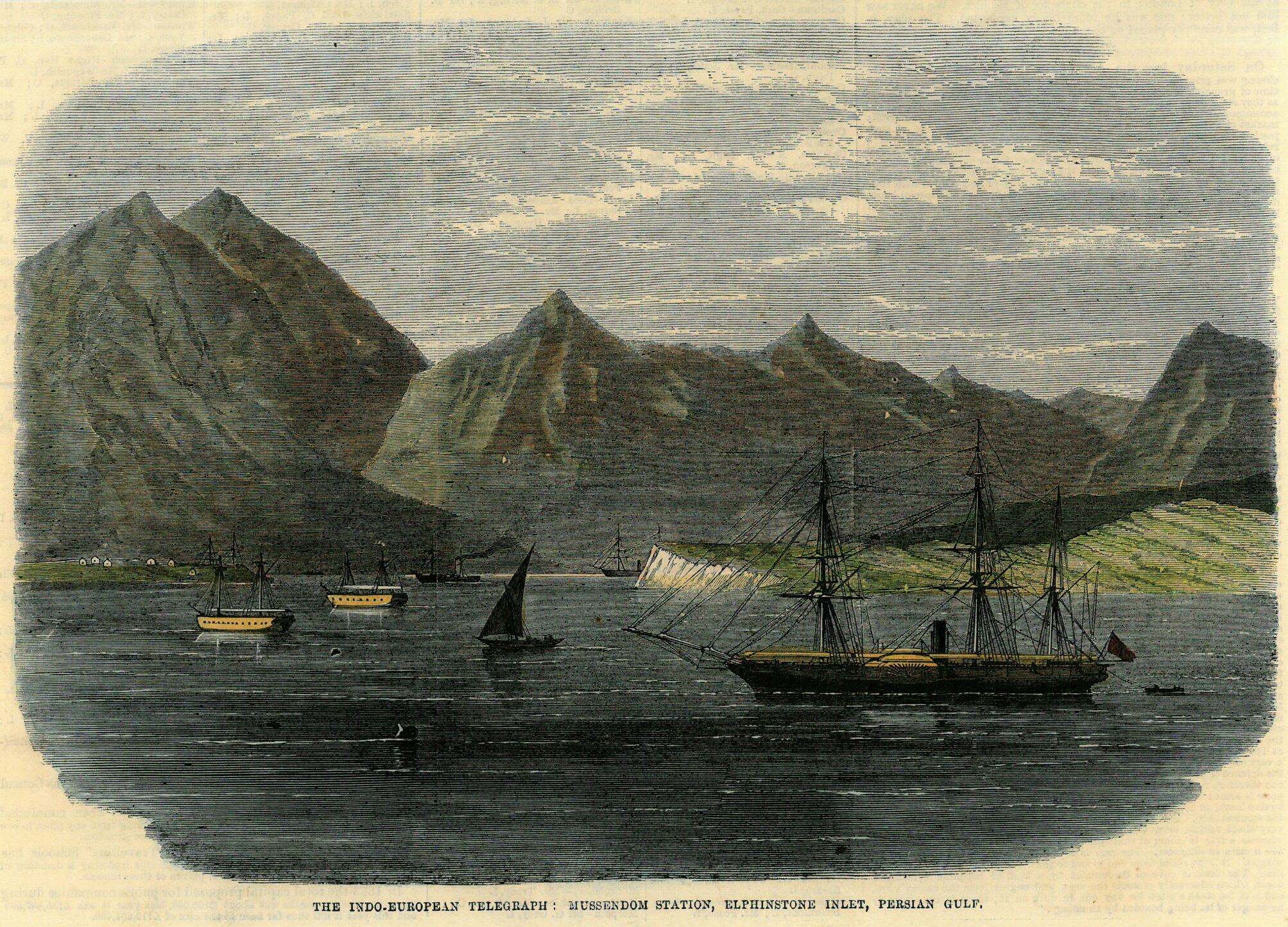
The Indo-European Telegraph ship Tweed. Mussendom Station, Elphinstone Inlet. Illustrated London News 1865

Telegraph Island, known locally in Arabic as Jazirat Al Maqlab, is located in the Elphinstone Inlet, under 400 meters off the shore of the Musandam Peninsula, and 500 meters south of Sham Island. The island was the location of a telegraph repeater station between 1864 and 1868, built by the British government's Indo-European Telegraph Department - formed in 1862 - under an agreement with the Sultan of Muscat at the time, Thuwaini bin Said. The decision to use Musandam as the location of the repeater followed a breakdown of negotiations with the Persian government and, following a survey, it was decided to run the cable from Bahrain to Musandam supporting the onwards hop to Gwadar, at the time also a dependency of Muscat, and then on to Karachi.

An 1864 additional article to the 1853 Perpetual Maritime Peace treaty with the Trucial States provided for the protection of the telegraph line and associated outstations.

The cable was in use only briefly, from 1865 until the end of 1868, when it was abandoned in favour of a new line between Aden and Bombay.

According to British accounts of laying the cable into the Elphinstone Inlet to Telegraph Island, "The aspect of the place accorded well with the known character of its inhabitants, who are wild and savage in the extreme."

The cable was relocated to run to Hengham Island in 1868. Telegraph Island continued to be manned by resident British soldiers following its abandonment as a telegraph station, until 1873.
