= Meraas =

UAE holding company

Meraas Holdings
- Type: Private company
- Founded: 2007; 19 years ago
- Headquarters: Dubai, United Arab Emirates
- Key people: Sheikh Ahmed bin Saeed Al Maktoum, (Group Chairman)
- Products: Real estate, tourism, retail, F&B, leisure and entertainment, hospitality, healthcare
- Parent: Dubai Holding
- Website: www.meraas.com/en

Meraas is a holding company privately held and headquartered in Dubai with operations and assets in the United Arab Emirates. In 2020, Meraas become a subsidiary of Dubai Holding, following a directive from Sheikh Mohammed bin Rashid Al Maktoum, Ruler of Dubai.

== History ==
Since its founding in 2007, the Dubai-based conglomerate has launched several projects in multiple sectors including real estate, retail, hospitality, food and beverage, leisure and entertainment and healthcare. Sheikh Ahmed bin Saeed Al Maktoum serves as the Group Chairman of Meraas.

The Meraas real estate portfolio comprises property development sales and asset management across Dubai. Projects include Port de La Mer, City Walk, Bulgari Resort, and Villa Amalfi in Jumeirah bay.

In 2019 Meraas launched its latest destination, Dubai Harbour. The proposed development was promoted as "the largest marina in the Middle East and North Africa", comprising a total of 1,100 berths. It was also due to be home to the 135-metre Dubai Lighthouse.

In 2021, Meraas unveiled Ain Dubai. Standing at more than 250-metres tall and with over 9,000 tonnes of steel, the Ain Dubai is located on the Bluewaters island destination. During construction, the structure was described as the "largest Ferris wheel in the world".

== Lines of business ==
The firm's real estate division comprises property development sales and asset management. Projects include City Walk, Bluewaters Island, Jumeira Bay, Pearl Jumeira, La Mer, and Dubai Harbour. In 2019, Meraas launched its first townhouse community in Dubai, Cherrywoods.

The firm's "Leisure & Entertainment" division operates entertainment destinations and venues, including the Dubai Safari. Other projects include The Green Planet in City Walk, a destination that recreates a tropical forest, Hub Zero in City Walk, an indoor entertainment centre comprising rides and virtual reality experiences, Hawa Hawa in La Mer, an inflatable playground, and Ain Dubai in Bluewaters, the world's tallest observation wheel.

The hospitality division handles hotel operations for the group and has partnered with hotel operators such as Bvlgari Hotels and Resorts, Jumeirah, Marriott, Nikki Beach Hotels and Resorts, Caesars Entertainment.

Meraas also has a retail division, food and beverage division, and a healthcare division. The latter include the Valiant Clinic in City Walk.

== Real estate ==
Meraas' real estate division comprises property development, sales and asset management across UAE.

Its developments have included Bluewaters Residences, a collection of one to four-bedroom apartments, penthouses and townhouses located on the man-made island of Bluewaters. The first phase of Bluewaters Residence was handed over to residents from February 2019. Other developments include Bvlgari Residences, a series of Bvlgari branded residences which were first handed over to residents from February 2018.

Central Park at City Walk is an urban residential development, while Nikki Beach Residences are a set of branded homes adjacent to Nikki Beach Resort & Spa Dubai in Pearl Jumeirah. The development includes one to four-bedroom apartments, penthouses and apartment townhouses.

The company also owns a number of real estate plots in Dubai, including Jebel Ali Hills, Jebel Ali Industrial Development, Jumeirah Bay and Al Warsan Industrial Plot.

== Destinations ==
Al Seef

Al Seef is a 1.8-kilometre waterfront promenade. It has a marina with 56 berths for private yachts.

Bluewaters

Bluewaters features residential, retail and hospitality zones bordered by walkways and a private beach. The destination is home to Ain Dubai, the world's tallest and largest observation wheel that stands at a height of 250+ metres.

Boxpark

In 2015, Meraas launched Boxpark, a destination spanning across 1.2-kilometres located on Al Wasl road.

City Walk

In December 2013, Meraas launched City Walk, an open-air lifestyle destination.

Dubai Harbour

In January 2017, His Highness Shaikh Mohammed bin Rashid Al Maktoum unveiled Dubai Harbour, with berths for yachts and views of some of Dubai's landmarks.

Kite Beach

Kite Beach features a 14-kilometre running track as well as volleyball courts, and a variety of food trucks, retail outlets, and eateries. The destination hosts community art fairs and markets, sports tournaments and races.

La Mer

La Mer, launched in October 2017, is a beachfront destination located on jumeirah 2.5-kilometres of beach.

Last Exit

Last Exit is a themed food truck concept offering "gourmet" street food.

Pearl Jumeira

Pearl Jumeira is home to Nikki Beach Resort and Spa Dubai that opened its doors on December 20 and features 132 keys including 117 rooms and suites, 15 villas and 63 private residences.

The Outlet Village

Launched in September 2016, The Outlet Village is an indoor retail destination.

== Enterprises ==
The enterprise division is responsible for the management of shareholders' investments, joint ventures and commercial partnerships. The division assesses business opportunities and engages partners that add value to the firm's portfolio. This division manages Dubai Parks and Resorts, Rove Hotels, Dubai Hills Estate, Dubai Water Canal, Caesars Bluewaters Dubai and Dubai Cruise Terminal.

Dubai Cruise Terminal, located in Dubai Harbour, is proposed to include two cruise terminals, capable of accommodating up to three cruise ships concurrently and up to 13,200 passengers.

Caesars Bluewaters Dubai, a strategic partnership by Meraas and Caesars Entertainment Corporation, includes two hotels, a beach club and theatre to the man-made island of Bluewaters Island.

DXB Entertainments, a Meraas company, is the largest leisure and entertainment company in the region and the owners of Dubai Parks and Resorts, the region's largest integrated theme park destination which is responsible for the operation of Roxy Cinemas and Shooting Stars.

Rove Hotels is a contemporary hospitality brand.

Dubai Hills Estate, a joint venture by Meraas and Emaar Properties, is one of the largest master-planned communities in Dubai.

Dubai Water Canal was developed by Meraas, Meydan and the Roads and Transport Authority (Dubai).

== Initiatives ==
In 2018, Meraas launched Visit Hatta, an initiative which comprises an adventure and activity centre, and a number of resort properties.

The company is also responsible for implementing Hala China, a joint initiative by Meraas and Dubai Holding which is aligned with Dubai's Tourism Vision 2020 and aimed at enhancing economic and cultural exchange to drive investment cooperation between Dubai and China. The initiative seeks to attract Chinese visitors and investors to Dubai.

== See also ==
- Nakheel Properties
- Emaar Properties
