= Palm Islands =

Artificial islands in Dubai, UAE

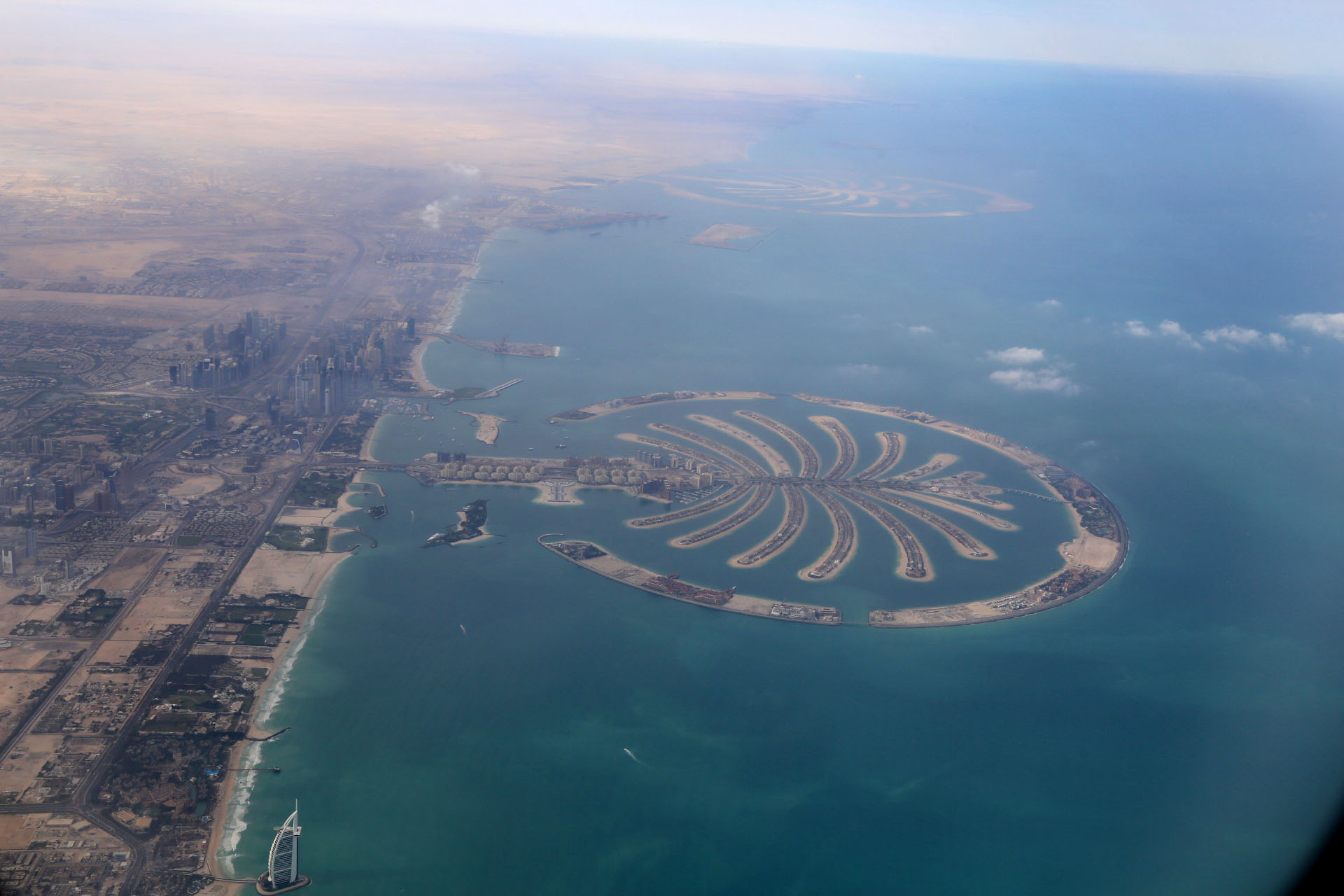
Palm Jumeirah, aerial view

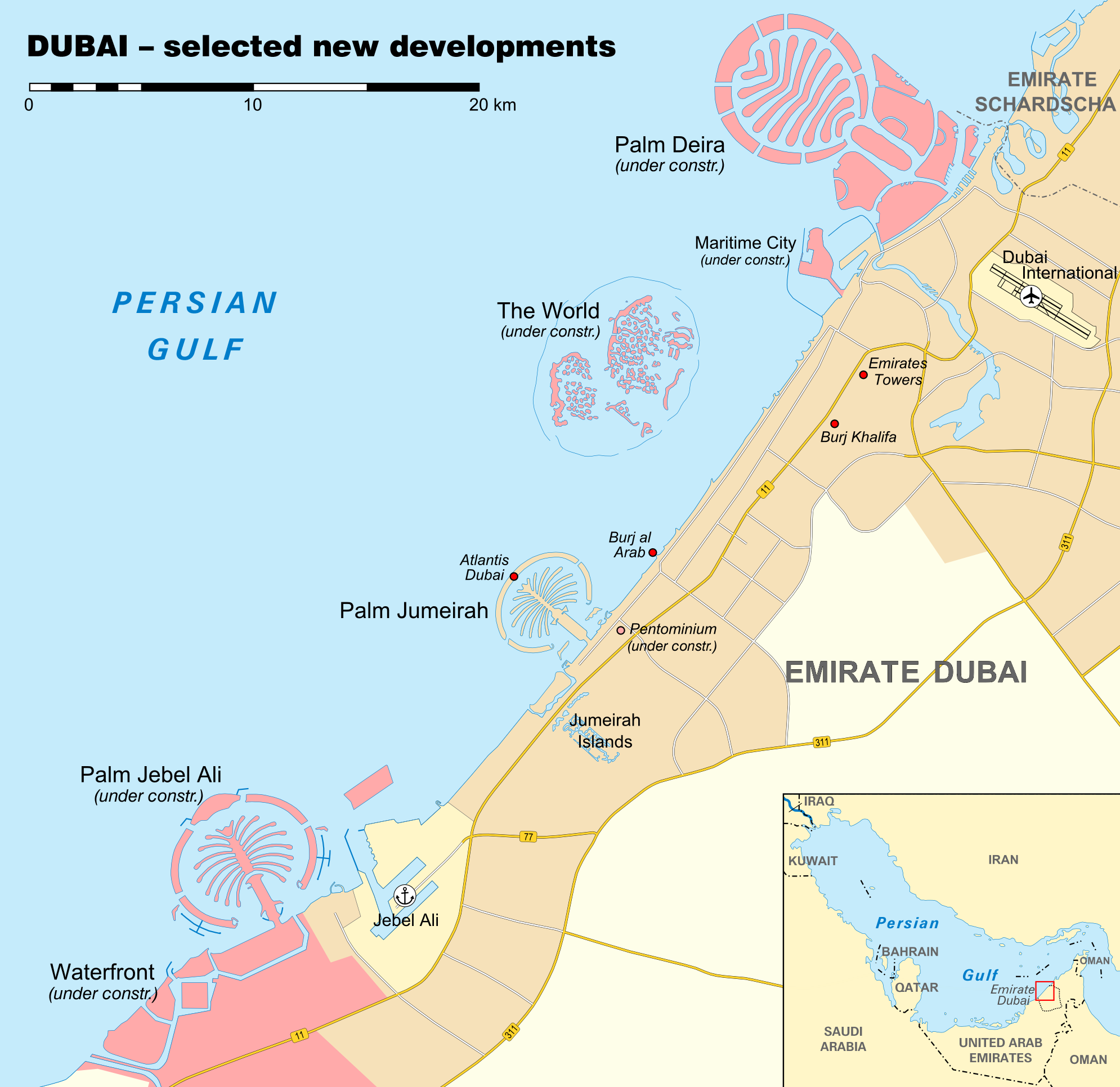
2010 map of developments, including Palm Jebel Ali (under construction), Palm Jumeirah (complete), Palm Deira (under construction), The World (under construction), The Universe (not shown here, cancelled), and Dubai Waterfront (cancelled).

The Palm Islands are three artificial archipelagos, Palm Jumeirah, Dubai Islands (formerly known as Palm Deira or Deira Islands), and Palm Jebel Ali, off the coast of Dubai, United Arab Emirates. The Palm Islands were constructed around the same time as The World Islands. Nakheel Properties is the Palm Islands real estate developer. The creation of the islands began in 2001 and ended around 2006/2007. These islands have significantly impacted ocean sediment and wildlife in the surrounding area.

== Islands ==
=== Current projects ===
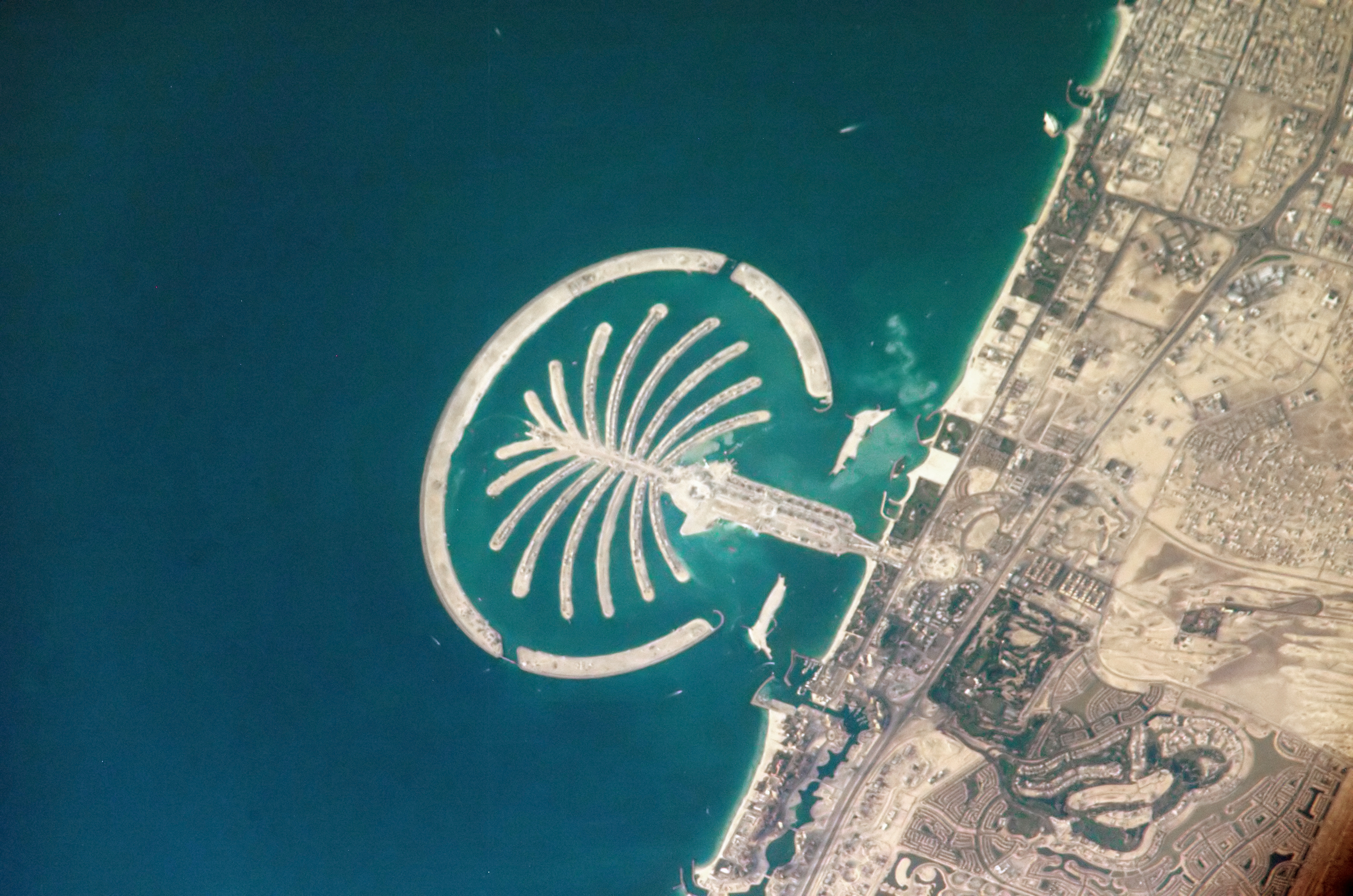
The Palm Jumeirah seen from the International Space Station

Palm Jumeirah (Google 25°07′00″N 55°08′00″E) is the site of numerous private residences and hotels. From the air, the archipelago resembles a stylized palm tree within a circle. Construction began in 2001 and was financed mainly by Dubai's petroleum income. By 2009, 28 hotels had opened on the site. The opening ceremony of the Palm Jumeirah was held in 2010. The Atlantis and Atlantis The Royal Residences are the largest hotels currently constructed on Palm Jumeirah. The island has a population of over 18,000 people as of 2015.

Palm Jebel Ali (Google 25°00′N 54°59′E) is an artificial archipelago that features a palm tree that is 50% larger than the Palm Jumeirah. Located near the southernmost Jebel Ali locality, The island has a larger crescent shape. Space has been created between the crescent and the tree to build boardwalks that encircle the "fronds" of the "palm" and spell out an Arabic poem written by Sheikh Mohammed bin Rashid Al Maktoum. After a subsequent redesign that scrapped the poem boardwalks, construction on the island began in 2001 but was halted due to the 2008 financial crisis. After 11 years of being dormant, the project was restarted in 2024 and will be completed in 2028.

Dubai Islands (25.3333°N 55.2681°E) are four undeveloped artificial islands off the coast of Deira, the northernmost locality in Dubai. As of 2025, little development has occurred on the islands. At first, the project, which was supposed to be a part of the Palm Islands, was known as Palm Deira. It was intended to be the biggest palm of the three, roughly eight times as big as the Palm Jumeirah. After the recession, it was scaled down to Deira Islands which utilized only the islands that were already built. However, this too was halted until Nakheel rebranded and relaunched it as Dubai Islands in 2024. The project will resume construction but an opening date has not been specified.

The World Islands are a nearby project of 300 small artificial islands constructed in the shape of a world map.

Bluewaters Island is an artificial island 400 metres (1,300 ft) off the Jumeirah Beach Residence coastline, near Dubai Marina, in Dubai, United Arab Emirates, home to Ain Dubai and Madame Tussauds Dubai.

Jumeirah Bay Island 1 ("The Seahorse-Shaped Island"), home to Bulgari Resorts and Residences.

Jumeirah Bay Island 2, home to Jumeirah Public Beach and the Dubai Water Canal

Pearl Jumeirah, home to the Nikki Beach Resort & Spa Dubai

Dubai Harbour, home to a major cruise terminal, a large yacht marina, hotels, and a long seafront promenade

=== Cancelled projects ===
Dubai Waterfront was expected to become the largest waterfront and largest man-made development in the world. The project was a conglomeration of canals and an artificial archipelago; it would occupy the last remaining Persian Gulf coastline of Dubai, right next to Palm Jebel Ali and the Dubai-Abu Dhabi border. It was planned to consist of a series of zones with mixed-use including commercial, residential, resort, and amenity areas, with its longest canal, stretching from the base of the Waterfront to Palm Jumeirah, circling the Al Maktoum International Airport. The artificial islands would be formed to resemble the most widely recognized symbol of Islam, the star and crescent. This would produce a shelter around the Palm Jebel Ali. It was later redesigned without the Islamic design, and due to the 2008 financial crisis, the project was stalled. With 40% of the islands already constructed, the project was cancelled.

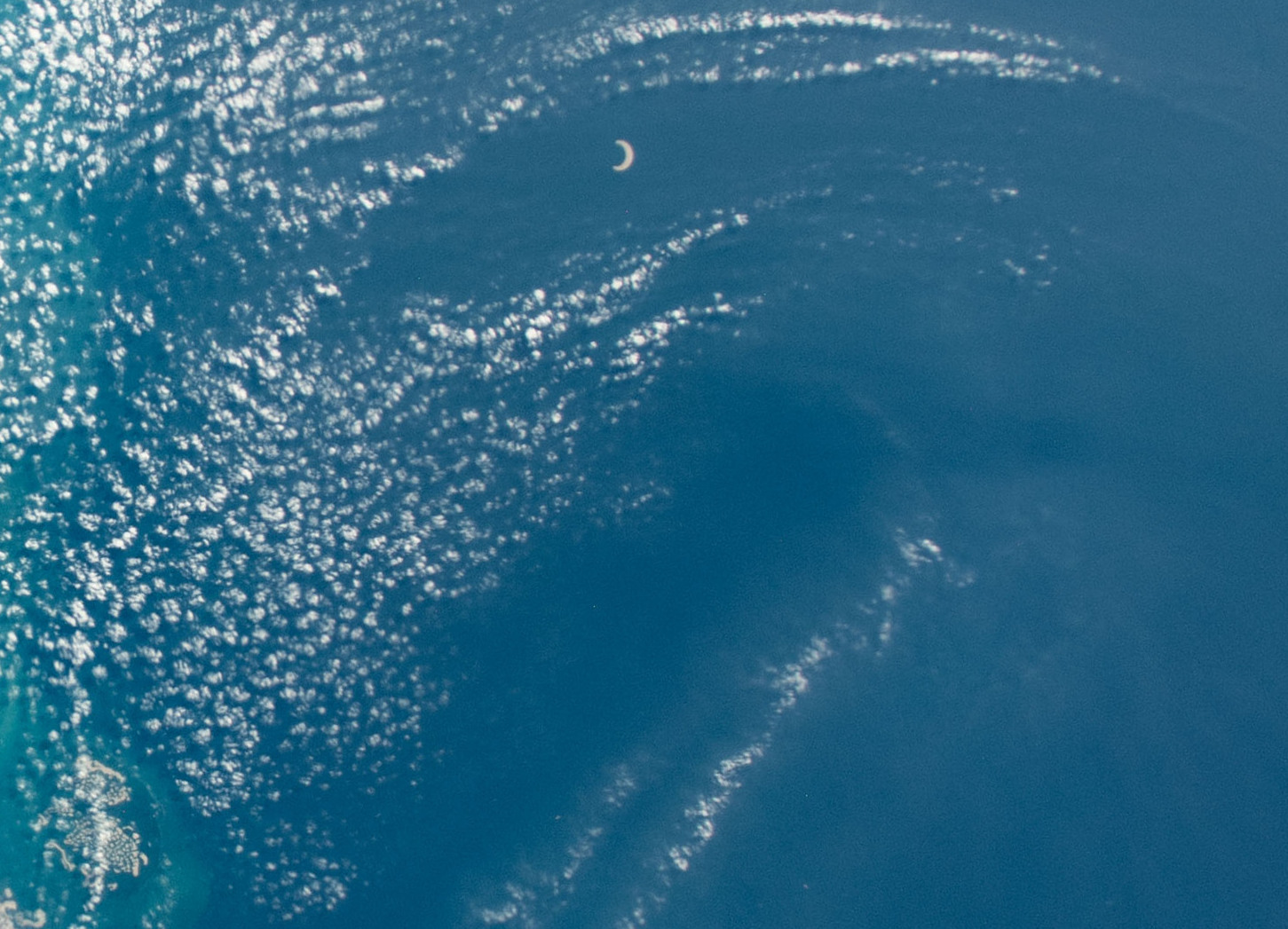
The World Islands, clouds and Crescent Moon Island (2019 photo, from ISS)

The Universe was a planned artificial archipelago in the shape of the Sun, Moon, Milky Way and Solar System, to be built on the coast of Dubai, United Arab Emirates. The Universe was to be located between the Palm Jumeirah and the World. The project plan was put on hold indefinitely in 2009 and later removed from the developer's website.

== Purpose ==
Nakheel built the Palm Islands to increase the coastline for tourists. Dubai is known for its sunny weather and beaches, but more than 72 km (45 miles) of coastline was needed to accommodate the goal of tripling the number of tourists to 15 million annually. The solution was to construct a massive island shaped like a palm tree, which, upon completion in 2006, would add 56 km (35 miles) to the coastline. The island is designed to be a city within itself, featuring shopping centers, restaurants, hotels, and residential properties.

== Construction ==
Palm Jumeirah was built entirely from sand and rocks; no concrete or steel was used to build the island. This was done following the order of the Ruler of Dubai, Sheikh Mohammed bin Rashid Al Maktoum, who came up with the idea for Palm Islands and the design.

=== Resources involved ===
- 5.5 million cubic meters of rock were brought from over 16 quarries in Dubai.
- 94 million cubic meters of sand brought from deep sea beds 6 nautical miles from the coast of Dubai.
- 700 tons of limestone.

=== Obstacles and risks ===
- Erosion caused by wind and water currents is one of the biggest problems, as erosion is stripping away the sand that forms most of the island. This results in loss of coastal shape along the seashores.
- Damage to the Marine ecology (for example, the loss of reefs and fish), including disturbances in the reproductive cycles of the species of fish that were close to the shores of Dubai. Research conducted by marine biologists on this phenomenon showed that the newly born fish could not survive in conditions along the shores of Dubai due to constant construction and environmental alterations (for example, shifting of sand, moving boulders, and the effects of the vibrations).
- Waves up to two meters high, as well as annual or biennial storms.
- Sinking, as well as weak soil due to constant exposure to the rising seawater.
- Water pollution.

Installation of utilities and pipelines was complicated and required a lot of labour.

=== Risk mitigation ===
To counteract the waves and constant motion of the sea, breakwaters were built around the island. They are 3 meters high and 160 km in total length. Expanded over a length of about 11.5 km, the base of these breakwaters and the island itself were constantly monitored during the construction process with the help of deep-sea divers. The divers checked the alignment and placement of the rocks beneath the surface to ensure their stability. The shape of the island was monitored using the global positioning system.

The sand on top of the island was sprayed by a technique called rainbowing. The whole island was planned to have no stagnant water between the island and the breakwaters. To achieve this, small structural modifications were made to the breakwaters surrounding the island, allowing the seawater to move through the breakers without causing any damage to the island. To prevent erosion of the sand from the island, maintenance systems spray material along the coast of the island and also along the coast of Dubai.

A vibro-compaction technique was used to prevent the process of liquefaction. This was done to hold the island's base together and to make a strong foundation for further construction.

== Environmental concerns ==
The construction of the Palm Islands along the coast of Dubai has had a significant impact on the surrounding environment, resulting in changes to area wildlife (especially aquatic life), coastal erosion, alongshore sediment transport, and wave patterns.

The origin of most of the environmental damage stems from disturbed sediment from the construction of the Palm Island. The sediment decreased the amount of sunlight filtering down to the sea vegetation and injured the surrounding marine fauna. Environmental disturbances caused by changes in sediment and coastal erosion have attracted the attention of environmental groups such as Greenpeace, who criticized the Palm Islands for the lack of sustainability.

The non-profit environmental news service Mongabay has reported on Dubai's artificial islands, stating that:

Significant changes in the maritime environment [of Dubai] [... ] As a result of the dredging and redepositing of sand for the construction of the islands, the typically crystalline waters of the Persian Gulf at Dubai have become severely clouded with silt. Construction activity is damaging the marine habitat, burying coral reefs, oyster beds and subterranean fields of seagrass, threatening local marine species and other species dependent on them for food. Oyster beds have been covered in as much as two inches of sediment, while above the water, beaches are eroding with the disruption of natural currents

— Butler, Rhett (23 August 2005). "Dubai's artificial islands have high environmental cost".

In 2006, the World Wildlife Fund announced, "[The] UAE's human pressure on global ecosystems (its ecological footprint) [is] the highest in the world. The country is supposedly at present five times more unsustainable than any other country" (Samarai, 2007). It also mentioned that the construction from the start-up to date had caused many visible ecological and environmental changes that threatened the future.

=== Geophysical effects ===
According to a study published in the journal Water in 2022, the construction of Palm Jumeirah Island has increased water-soluble materials, changed the water's spectral profile, and increased the water surface temperature around the island.

Variations in alongshore sediment transport have resulted in changes in erosion patterns along the UAE coast, which has also been exacerbated by altered wave patterns as the waters of the Persian Gulf attempt to move around the new obstruction of the islands. The rock walls constructed around the palm islands can result in different wave patterns along the coast of Dubai. Instead of hitting the shores directly, the waves move unusually around the new obstruction. This has led to the weakening of the shores of Dubai.

== Coastal protection ==
To properly manage their shorelines and effects, Dubai relies on its coastal monitoring program. Established in 1997, the Dubai Coastal Monitoring program began studying the baseline bathymetric (measurement of the depth of water in oceans or seas) and topographic survey of the Jumeirah (Dubai) coastline.

Additional data was collected with technological improvements, including remote video monitoring of Dubai beaches, sediment sampling and analysis, near-shore directional wave and current recordings, and intensive measurement exercises at selected locations using Acoustic Doppler Current Profiler (ADCP) equipment. Because of this, they can constantly monitor the continuously changing environmental conditions along the coast of Dubai.

In 2018, many rumours were abuzz that Palm Jumeirah and The World were sinking into the water. However, Nakheel claims that this is false.

== See also ==
- Tourism in Dubai
- Ocean colonization
- Tourist attractions in Dubai
