= Tourist attractions in Dubai =

Burj Khalifa, the world's tallest building

There are many tourist attractions in Dubai, resulting from the large scale construction boom. Dubai received 14 million tourists from all around the world in 2015. Euromonitor ranked the world's 150th most visited city by international tourists in 2009; Dubai ranked 7th. Dubai welcomed 14.36M visitors in 2022. Dubai's economy relies on many sections of the "state", one of the most important being tourism, in 2014 total 70,475,636 passengers traveled through Dubai Airport.

== List of Tourist Sites ==
=== Burj Khalifa ===
Burj Khalifa (Arabic: برج خليفة), "Khalifa Tower", pronounced inauguration, is a skyscraper in Dubai, United Arab Emirates. It is the tallest artificial structure in the world, standing at 829.8 m (2,722 ft).

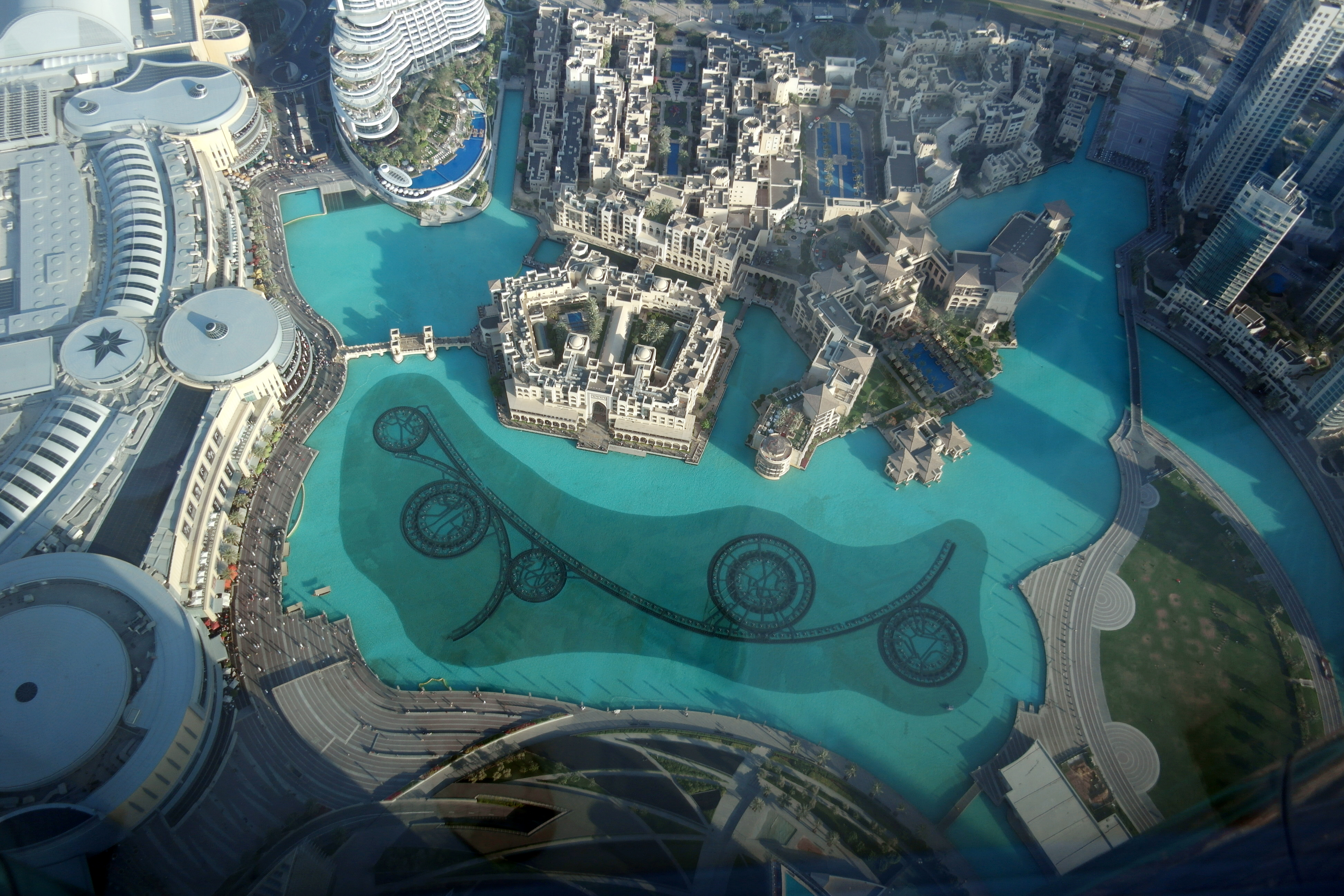
The Dubai Fountain

The building was opened in 2010 as part of a new development called Downtown Dubai.

=== The Dubai Fountain ===
The Dubai Fountain is the world's largest choreographed fountain system set on the 30-acre manmade Burj Khalifa Lake, at the center of the Downtown Dubai development in Dubai, United Arab Emirates. It was designed by WET Design, the California-based company responsible for the fountains at the Bellagio Hotel in Las Vegas. Illuminated by 6,600 lights and 25 colored projectors, it is 275 m (902 ft) long and shoots water up to 500 ft (152.4 m) into the air accompanied by a range of classical to contemporary Arabic and world music. It was built at a cost of AED 800 million (USD $218 million).

Dubai Frame

=== The Dubai Frame ===
The Dubai Frame is an iconic architectural landmark in Zabeel Park, Dubai. Standing 150m tall, it offers extensive views to old and present Dubai. The Dubai Frame has been open to public since 2018 and is one of the most popular tourist attractions in the city.

=== Dubai Aquarium and Underwater Zoo ===
The Dubai Aquarium and Underwater Zoo is one of the largest aquariums in the world. It houses numerous aquatic species, including a number of endangered species. It is home to 140 species of aquatic animals.

A “disturbing” video shared over social media depicted a woman trainer bouncing on top of a beached dolphin, while a person in the background laughed. The footage of act was captured at Dubai Dolphinarium, and was posted by an Instagram handler @aurelia_1534. But, it was immediately deleted due to extensive criticism from the public, with many denouncing it as “unethical and unprofessional behaviour”. A biologist and founder of UAE Dolphin Project, Dr Ada Natoli said that the case leads to a bigger debate on captivated animals.

=== Museum of the Future ===
Museum of the Future

Museum of the Future is an exhibition space for innovative and futuristic ideologies, services, and products. Located in the Financial District of Dubai, UAE, the Museum of the Future has three main elements: green hill, building, and void. The Government of the United Arab Emirates opened the museum on 22 February 2022. The goal of this museum is to promote technological development and innovation, especially in the fields of robotics and artificial intelligence (AI). One of the world's most complex structures, the Museum of the Future was designed by Killa Design and engineered by Buro Happold. The building aims for a LEED Platinum rating in terms of its green rating.

=== Dubai Miracle Garden ===
Dubai Miracle Garden is one of Dubai's signature creations. Launched on Valentine's Day 2013, it sits in the heart of Dubai with a total area of 72,000 square meters. The 150 million flower gardens are arranged in various arches and patterns. The Dubai Butterfly Garden, home to 15,000 butterflies, is contained in this garden. The Dubai Miracle Garden won two Guinness World Records for the largest vertical garden in 2013 and the world's largest floral sculpture in the shape of an Airbus A380 in 2016.

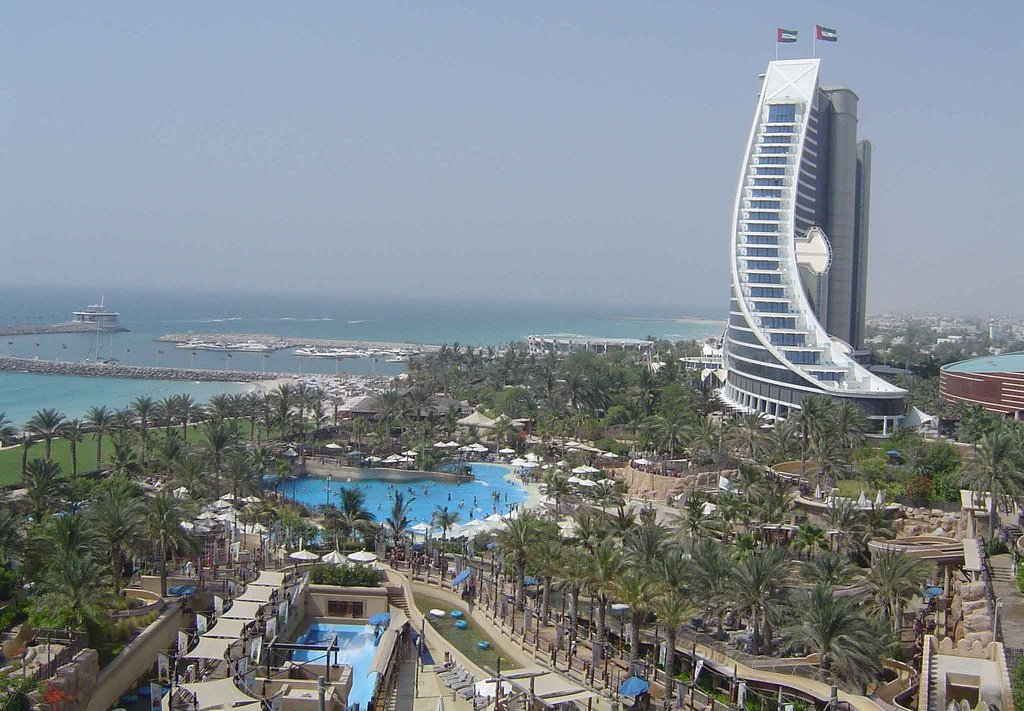
Wild Wadi Water Park

=== Wild Wadi Water Park ===
The Wild Wadi Water Park is an outdoor water park in Dubai, United Arab Emirates. Situated in the area of Jumeirah, next to the Burj Al Arab and the Jumeirah Beach Hotel, the water park is operated by Jumeirah International, a Dubai-based hotelier. Wild Wadi has a temperature-controlled wave pool with many water slides and two artificial surfing machines. The park previously had the largest water slide outside of North America, but it was removed and replaced with two other attractions. The park is host to an 18 m (59 ft) tall waterfall that goes off every ten minutes. The water park also has two gift shops, three restaurants, and two snack stands.

=== Dubai International Financial Centre ===
The Dubai International Financial Centre (DIFC) is a federal financial free zone situated in the Emirate of Dubai, United Arab Emirates. The DIFC was established pursuant to UAE Federal Decree No. 35 of 2004, UAE Federal Law No. 8 of 2004 and Dubai Law No. 12 of 2004. The DIFC occupies a physical territory of approximately 110 acres. It has its own legal system and courts distinct from those of the wider UAE, with jurisdiction over corporate, commercial, civil, employment, trusts, and securities law matters.

The DIFC aims to provide a platform for business and financial institutions to reach into and out of the emerging markets of the region. It was established to create an environment for growth, progress and economic development in the UAE and the wider region by providing the needed legal and business as well as physical infrastructure benchmarked against international standards.

=== Deira Clocktower ===
Deira Clocktower (Arabic: دوار الساعة ديرة), originally referred to as the Dubai Clocktower, is a roundabout in Dubai, United Arab Emirates (UAE). The Clocktower is located in eastern Dubai in Deira, at the intersection of Umm Hurrair Road and route D 89 (Al Maktoum Road). Situated in the locality of Al Rigga, the Deira Clocktower, now a prominent monument in Deira, provides access to the Al Maktoum Bridge, the first land crossing constructed between Deira and Bur Dubai.Dubai Clocktower was designed by Architect Ziki Homsi, a partner at Architecture Design Construction (ADC) Office. Also ADC was the builder of the clocktower in 1965.The Clocktower was erected as a symbol of Dubai and located in Deira because major routes into Dubai converged prior to the building of Dubai - Abu Dhabi Road. The Telegraph newspaper listed Dubai Clock Tower among the 17 "most beautiful clock towers" around the world.

=== Palm Islands ===
The Palm Islands are two artificial islands, Palm Jumeirah and Palm Jebel Ali, on the coast of Dubai, United Arab Emirates. As of November 2014, only Palm Jumeirah had been completed. This island takes the form of a palm tree, topped by a crescent. When complete, Palm Jebel Ali will take a similar shape. Both islands will be host to a large number of residential, leisure, and entertainment centers that will add a total of 520 kilometers of non-public beaches to the city of Dubai.

=== Dubai Gold Souk ===
Dubai Gold Souk or Gold Souk (Arabic: سوق الذهب), is a traditional market (or souk) in Dubai, United Arab Emirates. The souk is located in the heart of Dubai's commercial business district in Deira, in the locality of Al Dhagaya. The souk consists of over 300 retailers that trade almost exclusively in jewellery. Retailers in the souk include both well established stores like Damas, ARY Jewellery, Shyam Jewellery and Joy Alukkas as well as smaller stores that operate mainly in the gold souk. By some estimates, approximately 10 tons of gold is present at any given time in the souk It is bordered with the north by the Dubai Fish and Vegetable Market and the Deira Corniche near Baniyas Square at Sikkat al-Khali Street which is walking distance from Deira Bus Stand. Dubai Gold Souk can also be reached by taking the Dubai Metro to Al Ghubaiba and a regular Abra (boat) from nearby Bur Dubai across the creek. The Dubai Gold Souk is within walking distance of the Old Souk marine station.

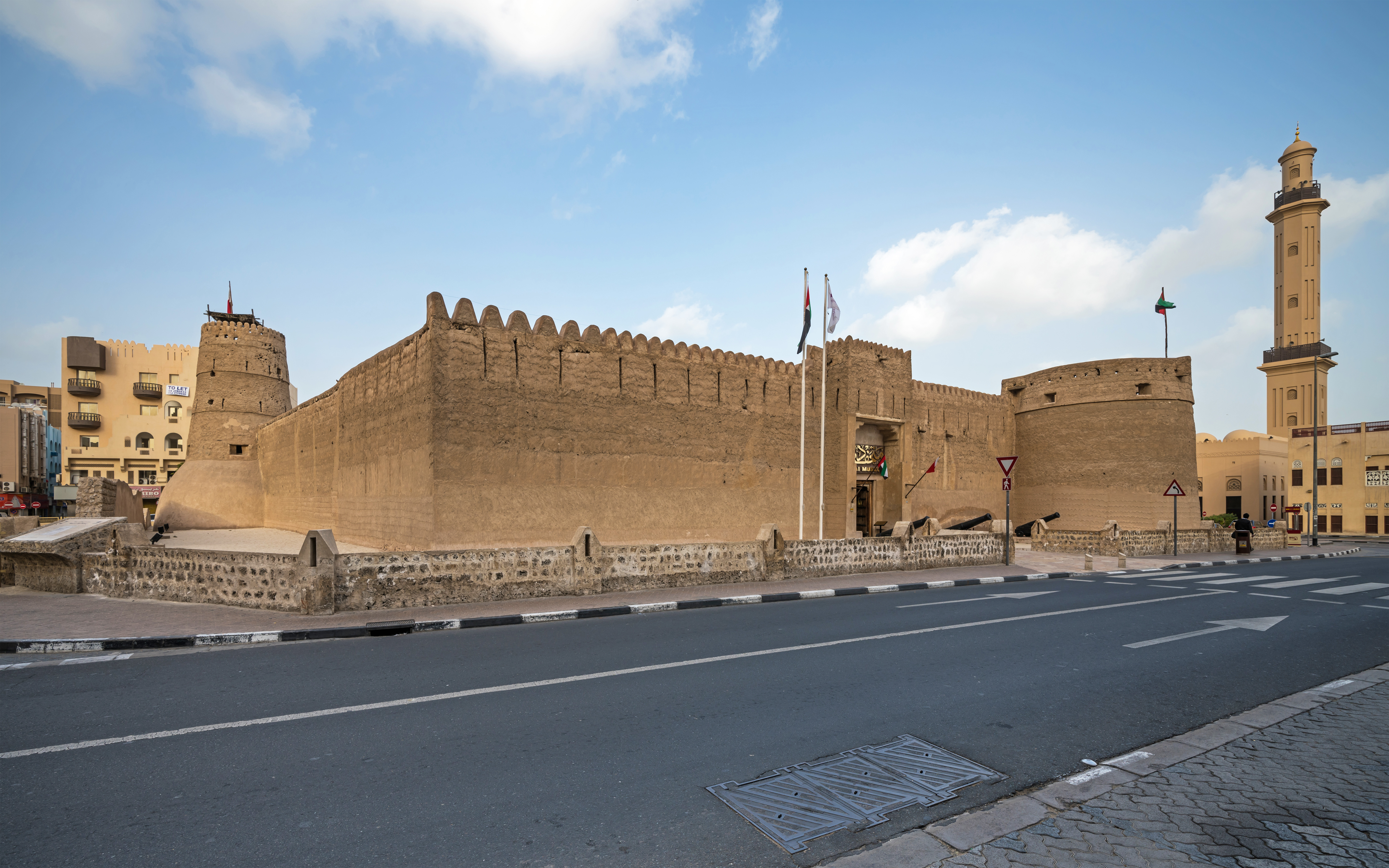
Dubai Museum in Al Fahidi Fort

=== Dubai Museum ===
Dubai Museum (Arabic: متحف دبي) is the main museum in Dubai, United Arab Emirates. It is located in the Al Fahidi Fort (Arabic: حصن الفهيدي), built in 1787 and is the oldest existing building in Dubai.

The museum was opened by the Ruler of Dubai in 1971, with the aim of presenting the traditional way of life in the Emirate of Dubai. It includes local antiquities as well as artifacts from African and Asian countries that traded with Dubai. It also includes several dioramas showing life in the emirate before the advent of oil, in addition to artifacts from recent discoveries as old as 3000 B.C.

In 2007, Dubai Museum welcomed 1,800 visitors daily, with a yearly total of 611,840. In March 2008, the Museum had 80,000 visitors. The most popular times are from August to April. The Museum received over 1 Million Visitors in the year 2013.

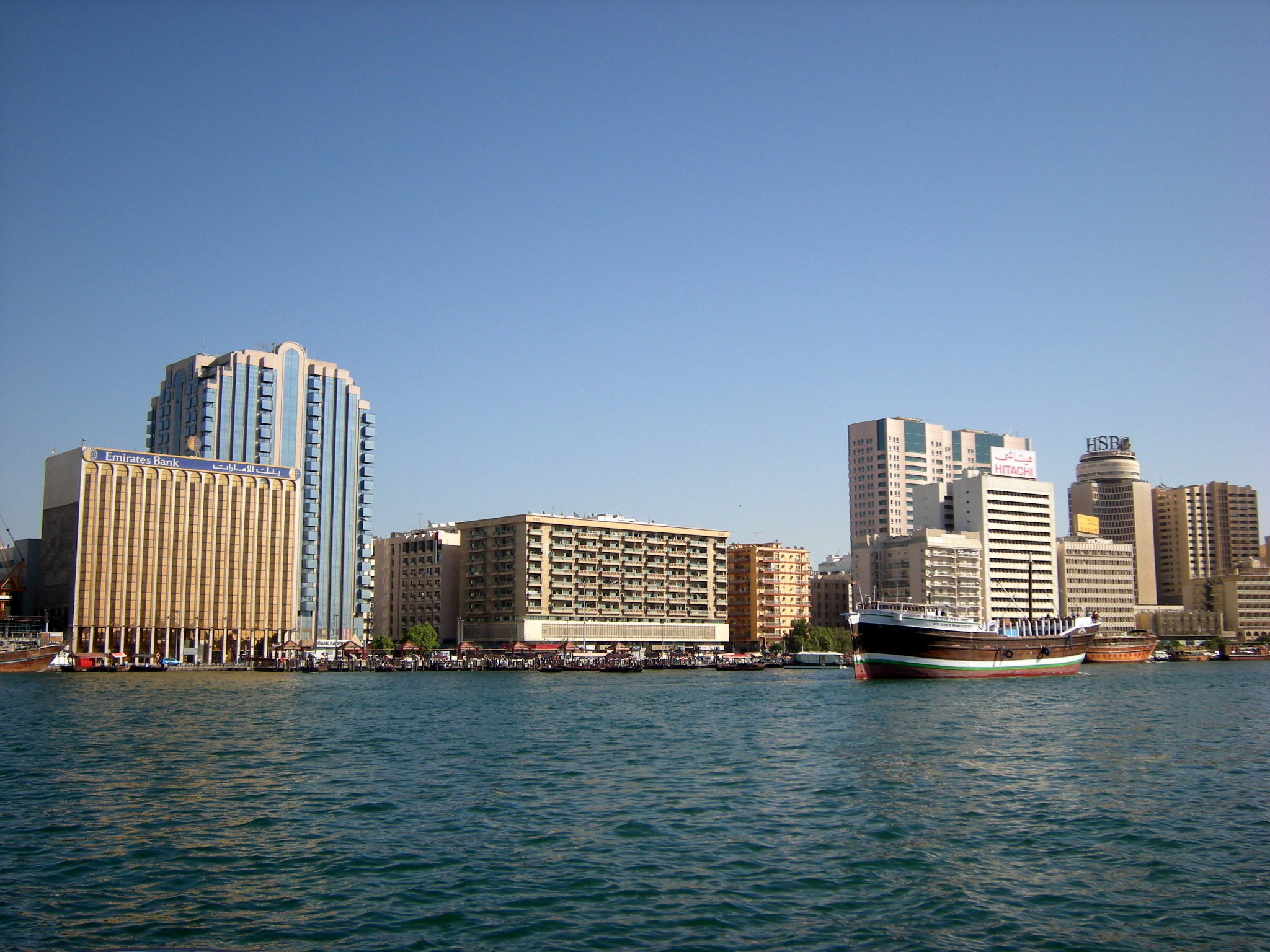
The Dubai Creek

=== Dubai Creek ===
Dubai Creek is a salt water creek located in Dubai, United Arab Emirates (UAE). It ends at Ras Al Khor Wildlife Sanctuary. Some sources say that the creek extended as far inland as Al Ain, and that the Ancient Greeks called it River Zara. Historically, the creek divided the city into two main sections – Deira and Bur Dubai. It was along the Bur Dubai creek area that members of the Bani Yas tribe first settled in the 19th century, establishing the Al Maktoum dynasty in the city. In the early 20th century, the creek, though incapable then of supporting large scale transportation, served as a minor port for dhows coming as far away as India or East Africa. Although it impeded the entry of ships due to current flow, the creek remained an important element in establishing the commercial position of Dubai, being the only port or harbour in the city. Dubai's pearling industry, which formed the main sector of the city's economy, was based primarily on expeditions in the creek, prior to the invention of cultured pearls in the 1930s.

Al Bastakiya

=== Bastakiya District ===
The area is known as Al Fahidi Neighbourhood or old Dubai. The construction of Al Bastakiya dates back to the 1890s. In its prime, the locality was capable of supporting 60 housing units, most of which were separated by narrow, winding lanes.

=== Meydan Racecourse ===
Meydan Racecourse is a horse racing facility located in Dubai, United Arab Emirates. It opened on 27 March 2010, replacing Nad Al Sheba Racecourse, which formerly occupied the same site. It can accommodate over 60,000 spectators in a 1-mile-long grandstand. When not used for races, it serves as a business and conference integrated facility. A horse racing museum and gallery are also planned. The development also includes a nine-hole golf course. The 7.5 million m² Meydan Racecourse includes Meydan Marina, The Meydan – the world's first five-star track-side hotel with 285 rooms, two race tracks and the Grandstand, which comprises a hotel, restaurants, a racing museum and 72 corporate suites for entertaining throughout the year.

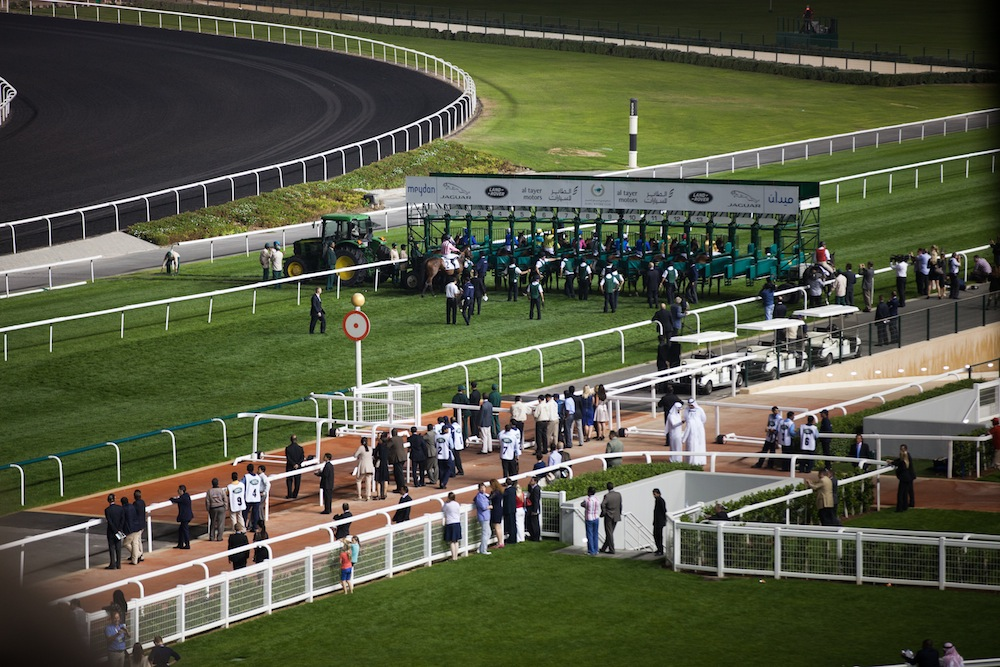
Meydan Racecourse

It has a 2,400 metre left-handed turf race track and a left-handed 8.75-furlong (1,750 metres) Tapeta synthetic dirt course. It operates from November, through March and features the Winter Racing Challenge, Dubai International Racing Carnival and the Dubai World Cup Night. The Dubai World Cup is the world's richest race day with over US$26.25 million as prize money.

The Racecourse district occupies 67 million square feet (620 ha); the overall Meydan City development however is 200 million square feet (1,900 ha). It is divided into four sub-districts: Meydan Racecourse, Meydan Metropolis, Meydan Horizons, and Meydan Godolphin Parks. Meydan is closely affiliated with Mohammed bin Rashid Al Maktoum, UAE Vice President and Prime Minister and Ruler of Dubai.

=== Ski Dubai ===
Ski Dubai is an indoor ski resort with 22,500 square meters of indoor ski area. It is a part of the Mall of the Emirates, one of the largest shopping malls in the world, located in Dubai, United Arab Emirates. It was developed by Majid Al Futtaim Properties, which also operates the Mall of the Emirates.

Opened in November 2005, the indoor resort features an 85-meter-high indoor mountain with 5 slopes of varying steepness and difficulty, including a 400-metre-long run, the world's first indoor black run, and various features (boxes, rails, kickers) that are changed on a regular basis. A quad lift and a tow lift carry skiers and snowboarders up the mountain. Adjoining the slopes is a 3,000-square-metre Snow Park play area comprising sled and toboggan runs, an icy body slide, climbing towers, giant snowballs, and an ice cave. Ski Dubai also houses a number of penguins who are let out of their enclosures several times a day. Penguin encounters can be booked, allowing the public to interact directly with the penguins. Winter clothing, ski and snowboard equipment are included in the price of admission. An extremely efficient insulation system helps the facility maintain a temperature of -4 °C (30 °F) during the day and −6 °C (21 °F) at night when the snow is produced.

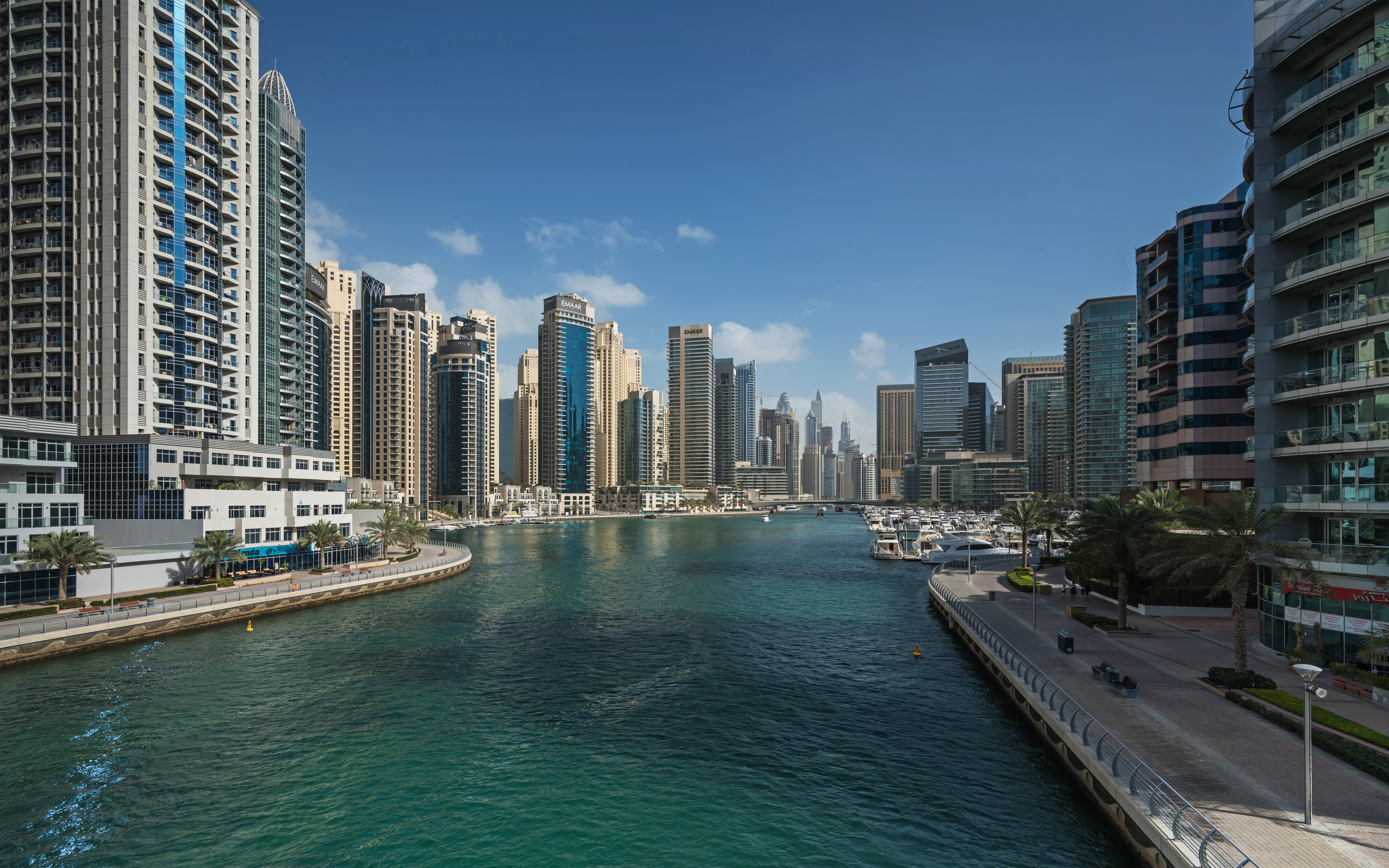
Dubai Marina

=== Dubai Marina ===
Dubai Marina (Arabic: مرسى دبي) is a district in Dubai, United Arab Emirates. Dubai Marina is an artificial canal city, built along a two-mile (3 km) stretch of Persian Gulf shoreline. When the entire development is complete, it will accommodate more than 120,000 people in residential towers and villas. It is located on Interchange 5 between Jebel Ali Port and the area which hosts Dubai Internet City, Dubai Media City, and the American University in Dubai. The first phase of this project has been completed. Dubai Marina was inspired by the Concord Pacific Place development along False Creek in Vancouver, British Columbia, Canada.

=== Global Village ===
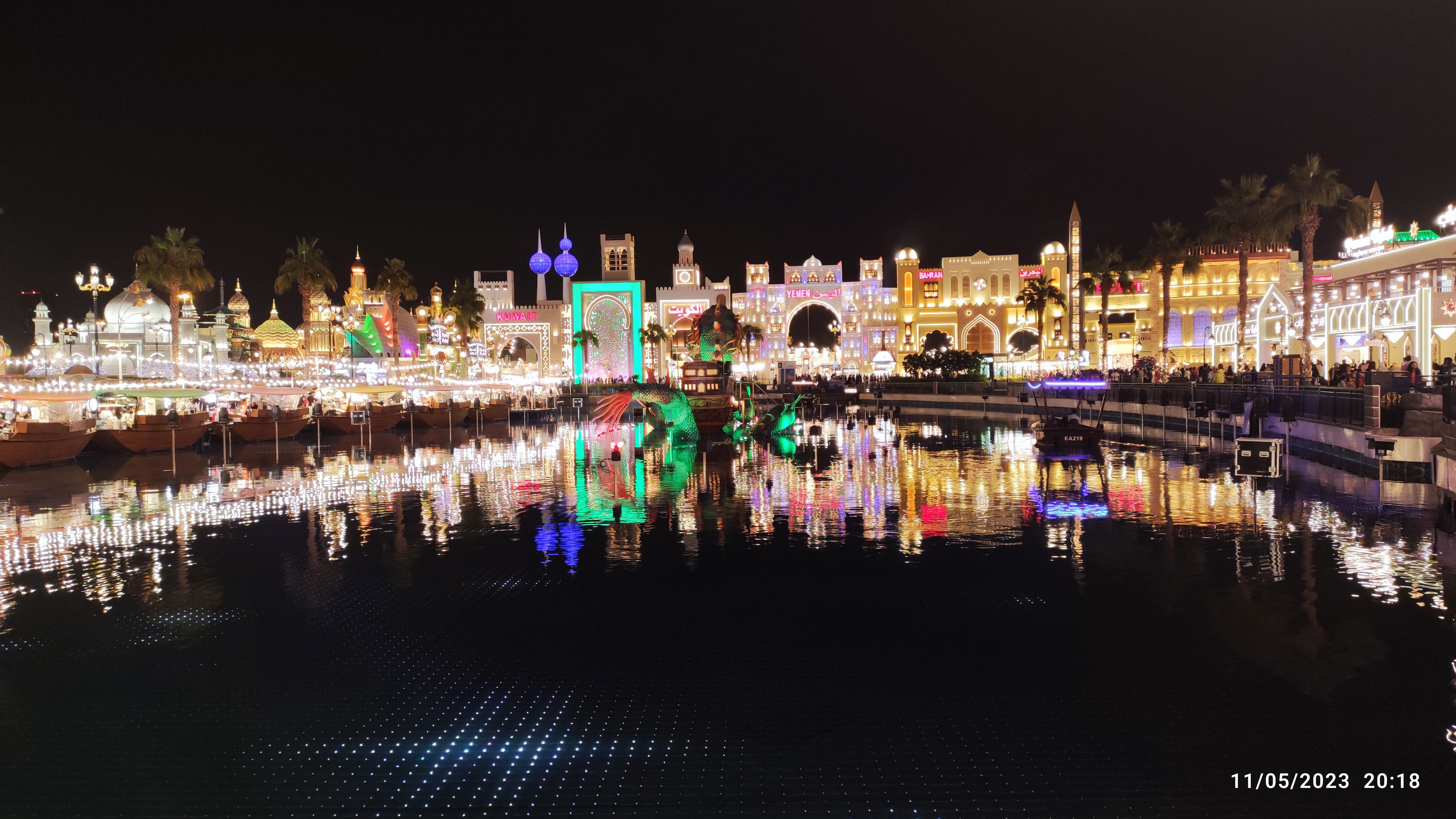
Global Village, Dubai, 2023

The Global Village is claimed to be the world's largest tourism, leisure, and entertainment project. It is the region's first cultural, entertainment, family and shopping destination. Every year, it has over 5 million visitors over an area of 17,200,000 sq ft (1,600,000 m^{2}). It is located at Sheikh Mohammed Bin Zayed Road (E 311); Exit 37.

=== World Islands ===
The World is an artificial archipelago of various small islands constructed in the rough shape of a world map. It is located in the waters of the Persian Gulf, 4.0 kilometres (2.5 mi) off the coast of Dubai, United Arab Emirates. The World islands are composed mainly of sand dredged from Dubai's shallow coastal waters, and are one of several artificial island developments in Dubai

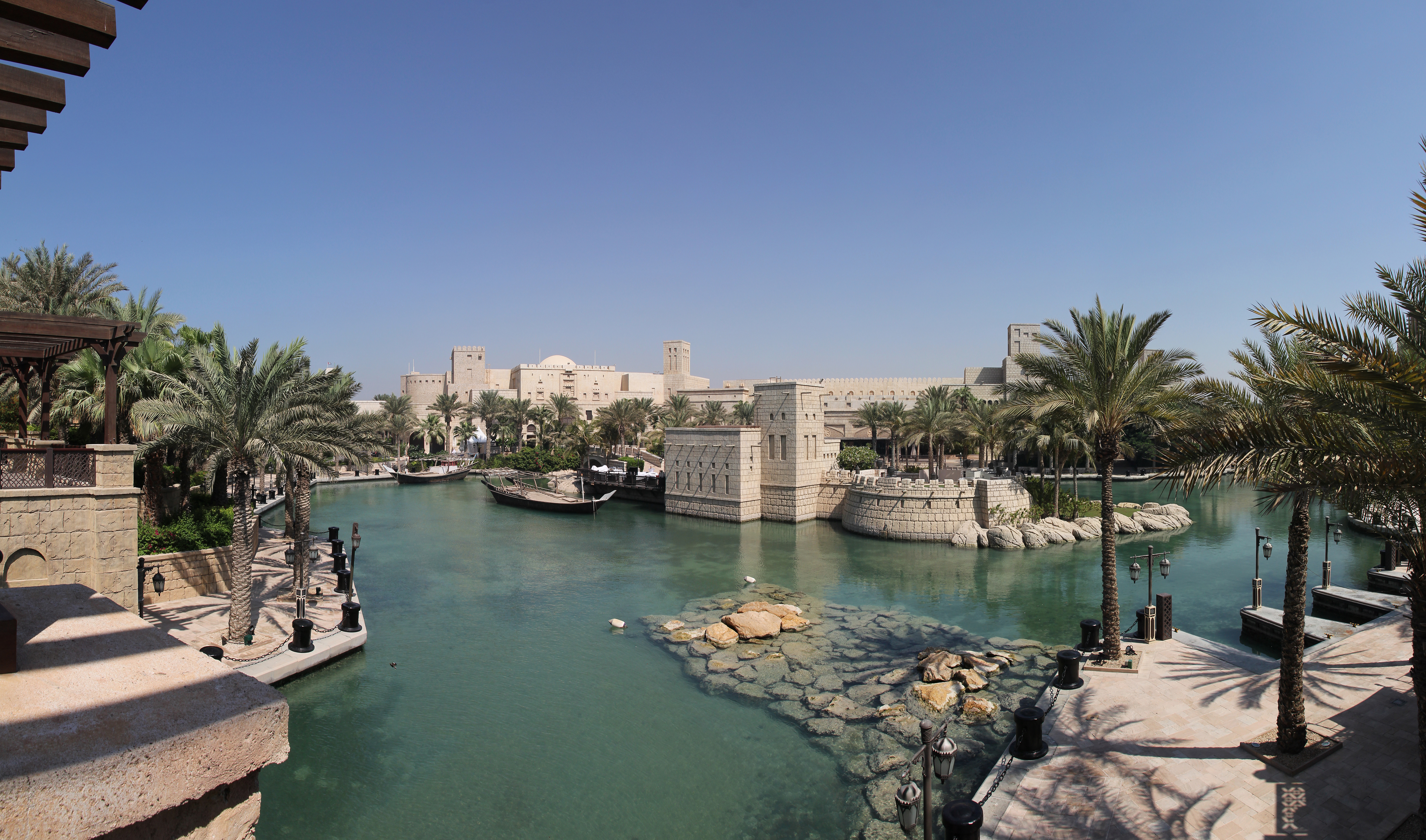
Madinat Jumeirah

=== Madinat Jumeirah ===
Madinat Jumeirah is a luxurious 5 star resort spreading across over 40 hectares of landscapes and gardens. It is designed to resemble a traditional Arabian town. The resort comprises three boutique hotels (Jumeirah Al Naseem, Al Qasr, and Mina A'Salam) and a courtyard of 29 summer houses called 'Dar Al Masyaf'. The resort has over 40 restaurants and bars. Abra tour takes the customers to move around in Madinat Jumeirah. This tour is not free of cost and available every 20 minutes.

=== Hotels ===
Since many of the people in Dubai are tourists and not permanent residents, there are plenty of intriguing hotels built to house these temporary residents. Some of these hotels have become iconic symbols of the emirate, such as the Burj Al Arab. The Burj Al Arab standing at 321 m (1,050 ft), is the second tallest building in the world is used exclusively as a hotel. It has become a symbol of Dubai, designed architecturally to caricature the sail of a boat. It is built on a man-made island and is connected to the mainland by a bridge. The hotel's many breathtaking restaurants and expensive suites make it suitable of its label, "The worlds only seven-star property".

=== Madame Tussauds Dubai ===
Madame Tussauds Dubai is a wax museum and tourist attraction location on Bluewaters Island in Dubai. It opened in September 2021. It is the first Tussauds museum in the Middle East and twenty-fifth worldwide. The wax figures are featured in a range of themed settings such as of Music Party, Fashion, Leaders, Bollywood, Film, Sport, and Media. It features over 90 wax models, including political and entertainment figures such Miley Cyrus, Shahrukh Khan, Kareena Kapoor, Maya Diab, Justin Bieber, Chris Hemsworth, David Beckham, Victoria Beckham, Hrithik Roshan, Deepika Padukone, Nancy Ajram, Taylor Swift, Vin Diesel, Priyanka Chopra, Varun Dhawan, Balqees Ahmed Fathi, Amna Al Haddad, and Mohamed Salah.

=== The View at The Palm ===
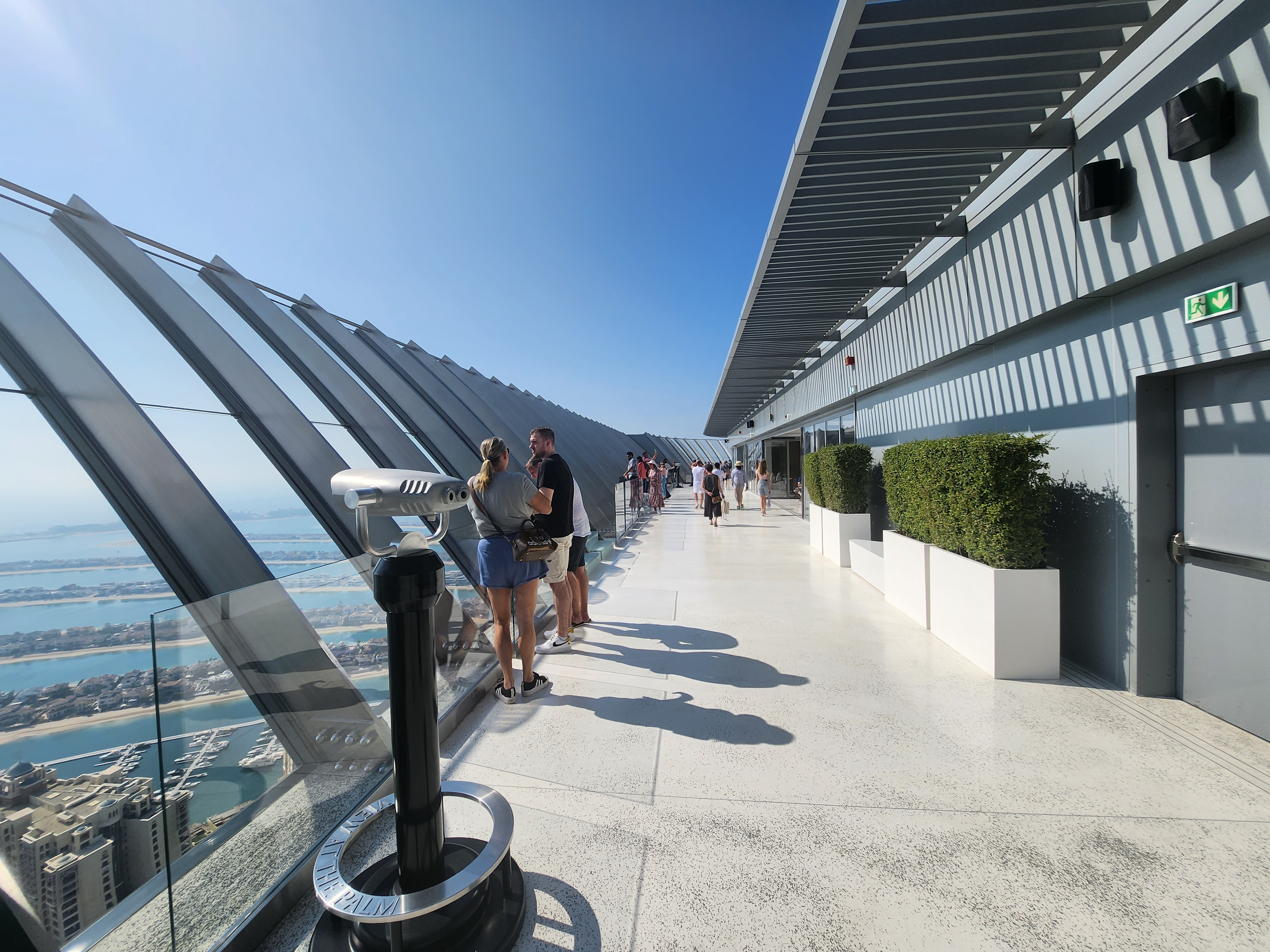
Observation deck of The View at The Palm

The View at The Palm is a 360-degree observation deck that is 52-storeys high. The deck is located at the top of The Palm Tower, rising to 240 meters high. The View observation deck was developed by Nakheel Properties and opened on April 7, 2021. The View at The Palm overlooks Palm Jumeirah, the Persian Gulf, and the Dubai skyline, along with an interactive experience displaying insights about the making of Palm Jumeirah. The View is accessible from the top of Nakheel Mall through level two of the Palm Tower, which also serves as the lobby of The View Palm. The tourist attraction hosts Starbucks Café, The View Exhibition, an interactive aquarium tunnel, and a gift shop.

=== Ferrari World Abu Dhabi ===
The first Ferrari-branded theme park in the world features Formula Rossa, the world's fastest roller coaster. The foundation stone for the park was laid on 3 November 2007. It is located on the Yas Island, Abu Dhabi, UAE. It is the largest indoor theme park in the world.

=== Infinity des Lumières ===
Infinity des Lumières is an immersive digital art museum in Dubai opened in 2021. The museum is located on the 2nd level of The Dubai Mall facing Galeries Lafayette and is the largest digital art center in the Middle East, occupying a space of 2,700 square meters and equipped with 130 projectors, 58 speakers, and 3,000 high-definition images, all pieced together in a digital masterpiece.

=== Yas Island ===
Yas Island is a man-made island in Abu Dhabi, the capital of the United Arab Emirates (UAE). It is a popular leisure and entertainment destination that offers a variety of attractions and activities. Notable attractions include the Yas Marina Circuit for motorsports, Ferrari World Abu Dhabi theme park, Yas Waterworld, and Warner Bros. World Abu Dhabi. Yas Mall offers extensive shopping. Yas Links Abu Dhabi provides an 18-hole championship golf course.

== See also ==
- List of development projects in Dubai
- Tourism in Dubai
- List of tourist attractions in the United Arab Emirates
  - Ain Dubai
  - Dubai Safari Park
