= Jumeirah Beach Residence =

Waterfront community in the Emirates

Coordinates: 25°04′38.00″N 55°08′05.53″E

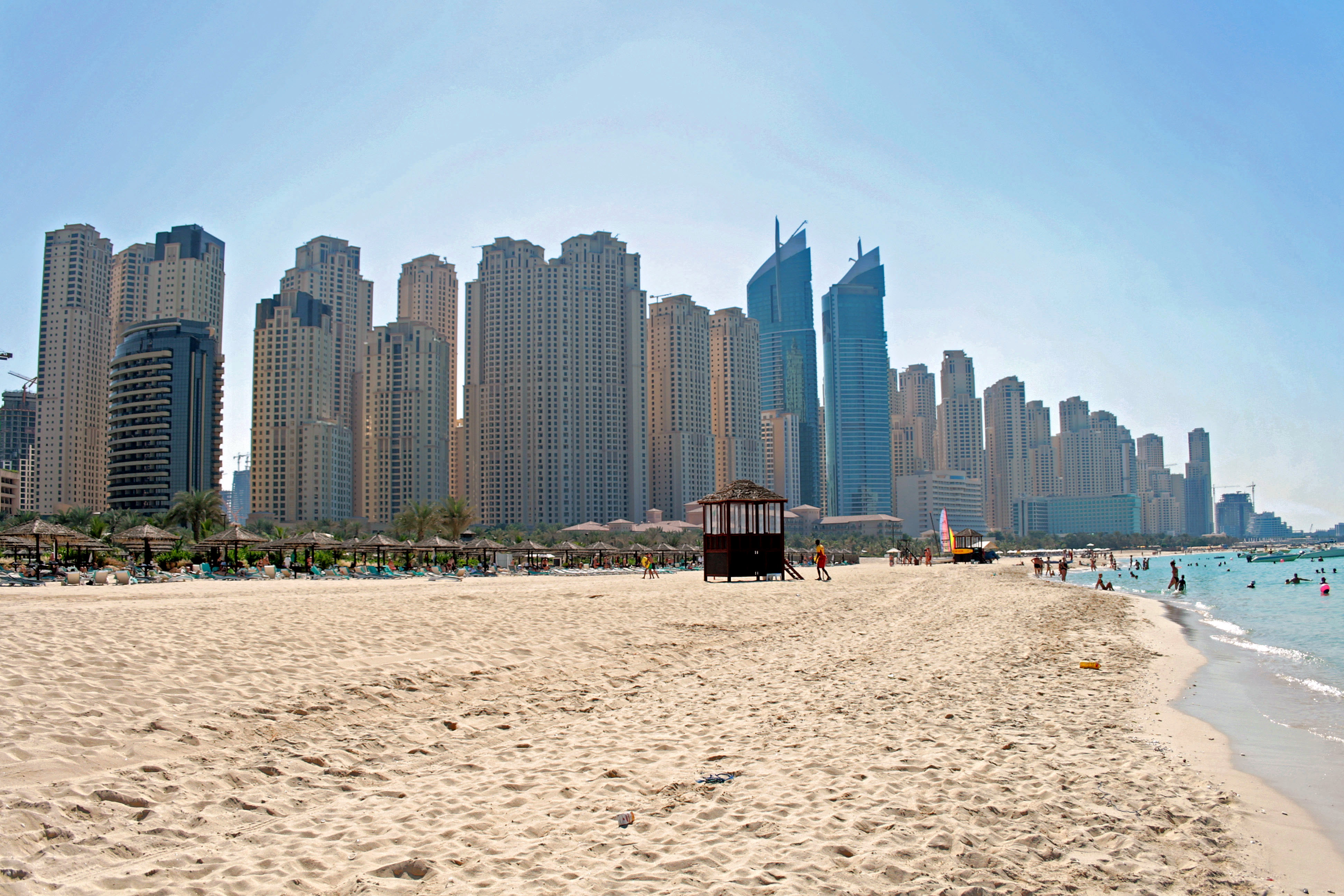
Jumeirah Beach Residence area and beachfront

Jumeirah Beach Residence (also known as JBR) is a 1.7 kilometres (1.1 mi) long, 2 square kilometres (0.77 sq mi) gross floor area waterfront community located on the coast of the Persian Gulf in Dubai Marina in Dubai, United Arab Emirates. It is a residential development and contains 40 towers (35 are residential and 5 are hotels). JBR can accommodate about 15,000 people, living in its apartments and hotel rooms. The Project has 6,917 apartments, from 900 sq ft (84 m^{2}) studios to 5,500 sq ft (510 m^{2}) penthouses. JBR has a total of six residential blocks, Shams, Amwaj, Rimal, Bahar, Sadaf and Murjan (in order from west to east). JBR is within walking distance to Dubai Marina, Dubai Tram and Dubai Metro.

The developer, Dubai Properties (a subsidiary of Dubai Holding), launched JBR in August 2002. This 6-billion dirham project was completed in 2010.

== The Walk ==
The Walk at Jumeirah Beach Residence is a 1.7-kilometre strip on the ground and plaza levels of the complex. It was developed by Dubai Properties, was completed by 2007 and opened officially in August 2008.

== The Beach ==
The Beach at Jumeirah Beach Residence is a retail complex constructed on the actual beach in front of JBR by Meraas Holding, a company owned by Sheikh Mohammed bin Rashid Al Maktoum, vice-president and prime minister of the UAE and ruler of Dubai. The development, comprising four distinct plazas, occupies the bulk of the beachfront between the Hilton and Sheraton hotels and houses a number of levels of parking as well as seventy retail and food and beverage outlets, alongside entertainment facilities.

The Beach provides a view of the Ain Dubai (formerly the Dubai Eye) observation wheel on Bluewaters Island, an artificial island.

== Bluewaters Island ==
Bluewaters Island is a man-made island being constructed opposite Jumeirah Beach Residence. The development comprises hotels, apartments, villas, dining and entertainment facilities, and the Ain Dubai (formerly the Dubai Eye), a 250 m (820 ft) tall Ferris wheel, which is the tallest in the world. The island is linked by a highway to Sheikh Zayed Road and a pedestrian bridge to Jumeirah Beach Residence.

== Panorama ==
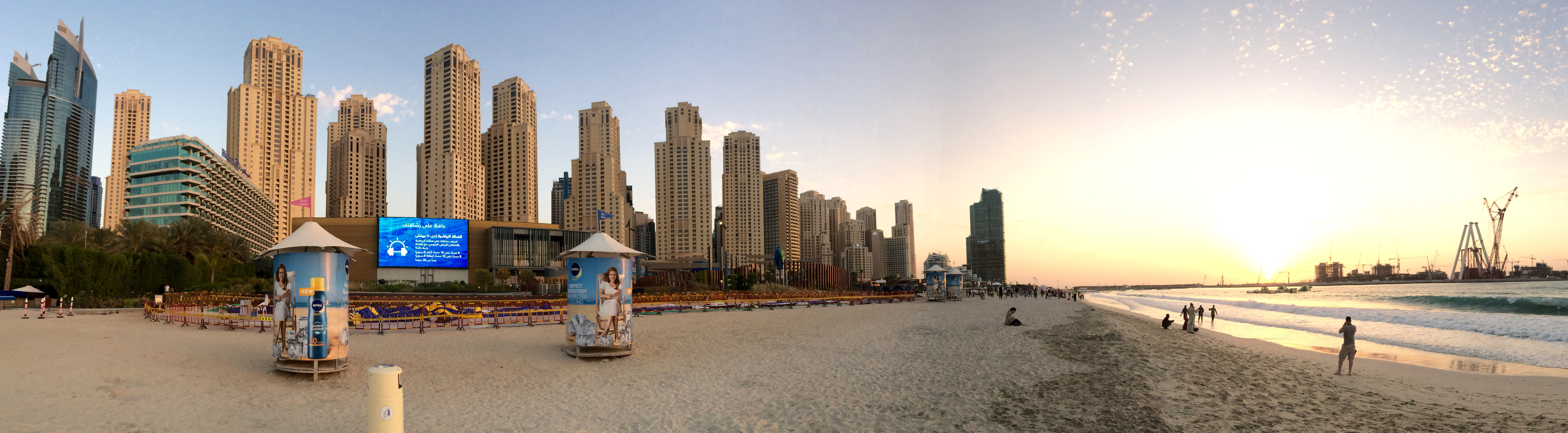
The Beach – Jumeirah Beach Residence.

== Gallery ==
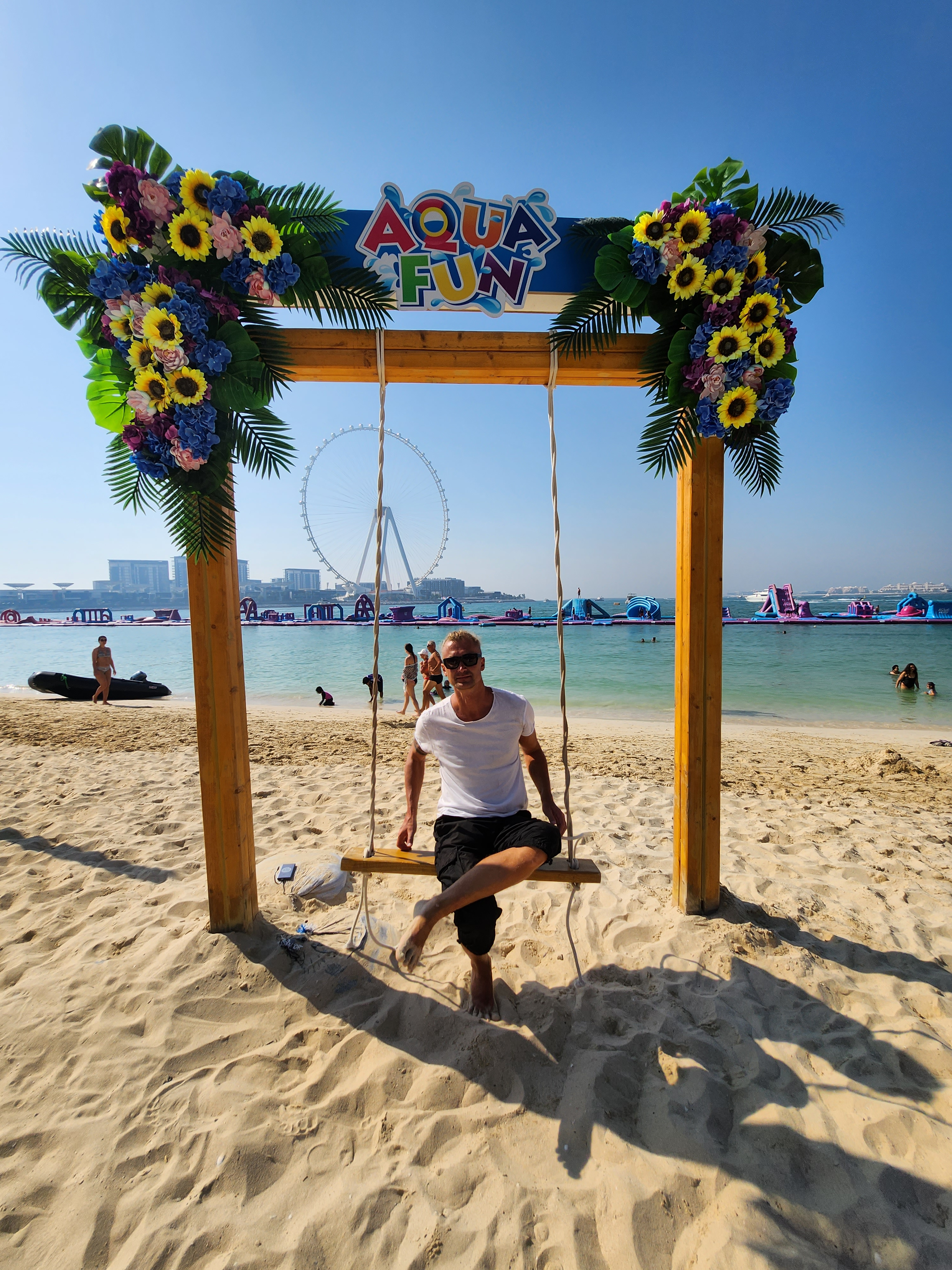
AquaFun Water Park in JBR Beach

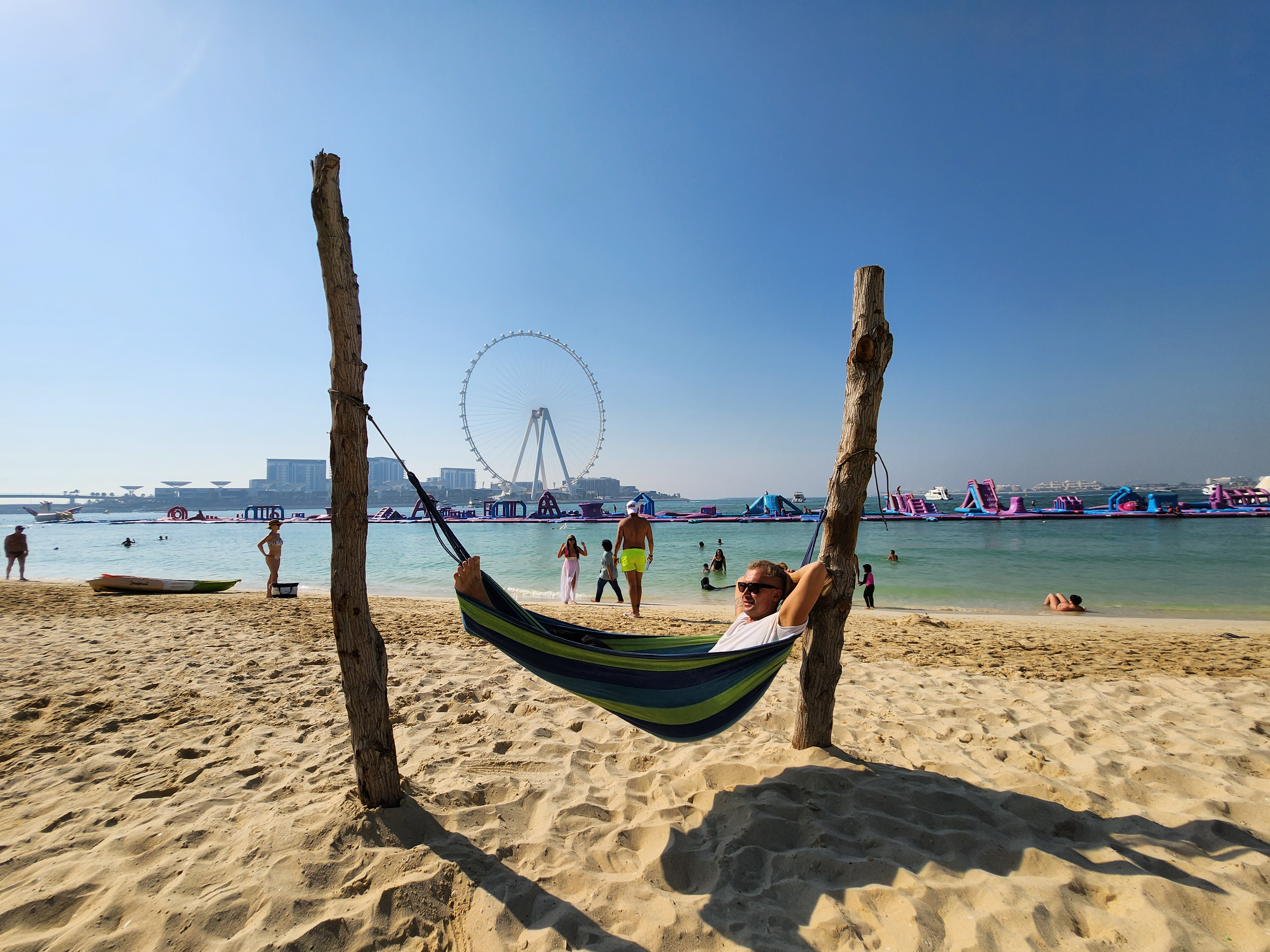
Hammock with Ain Dubai view in JBR Beach

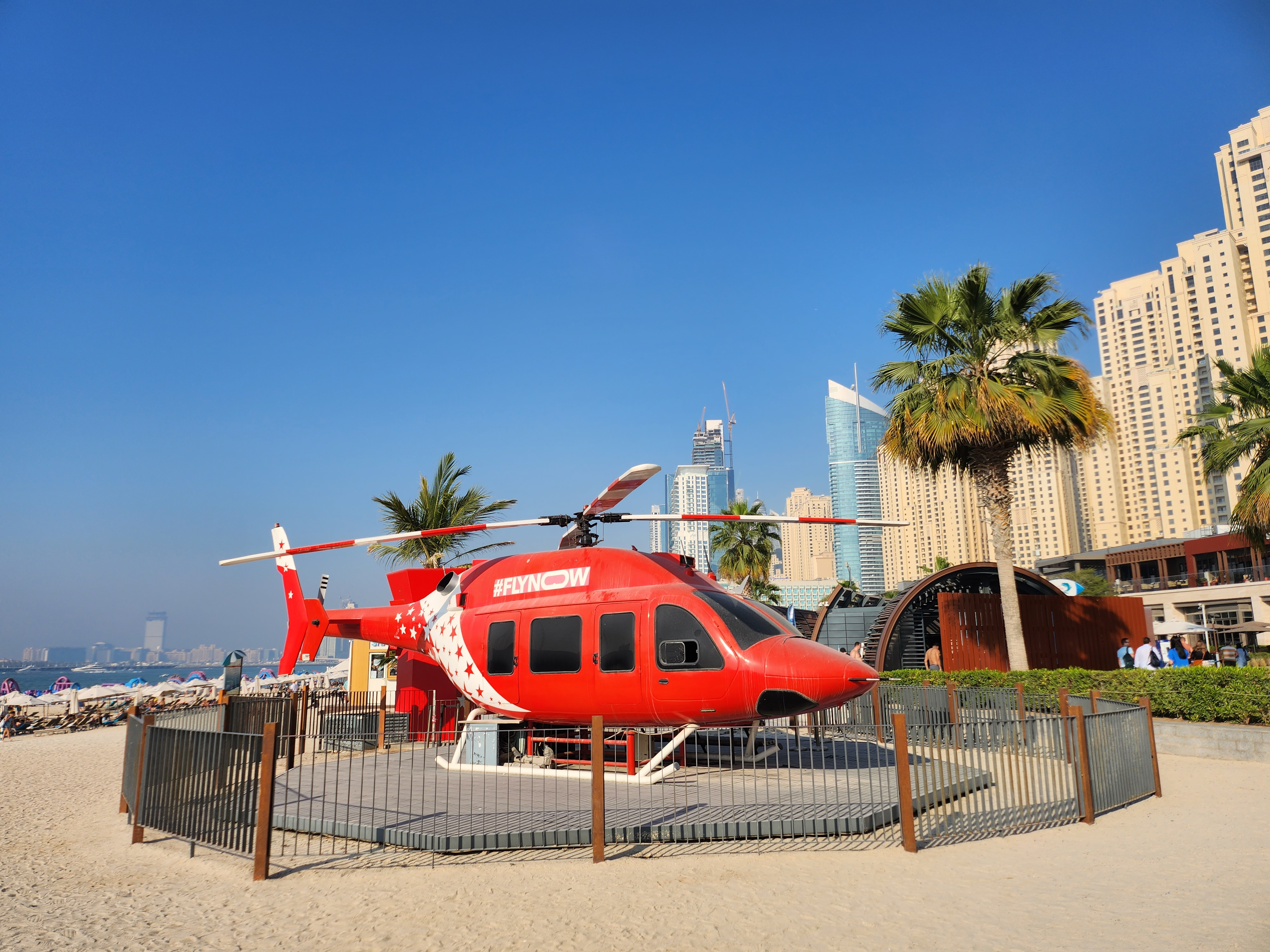
Helicopter in JBR Beach

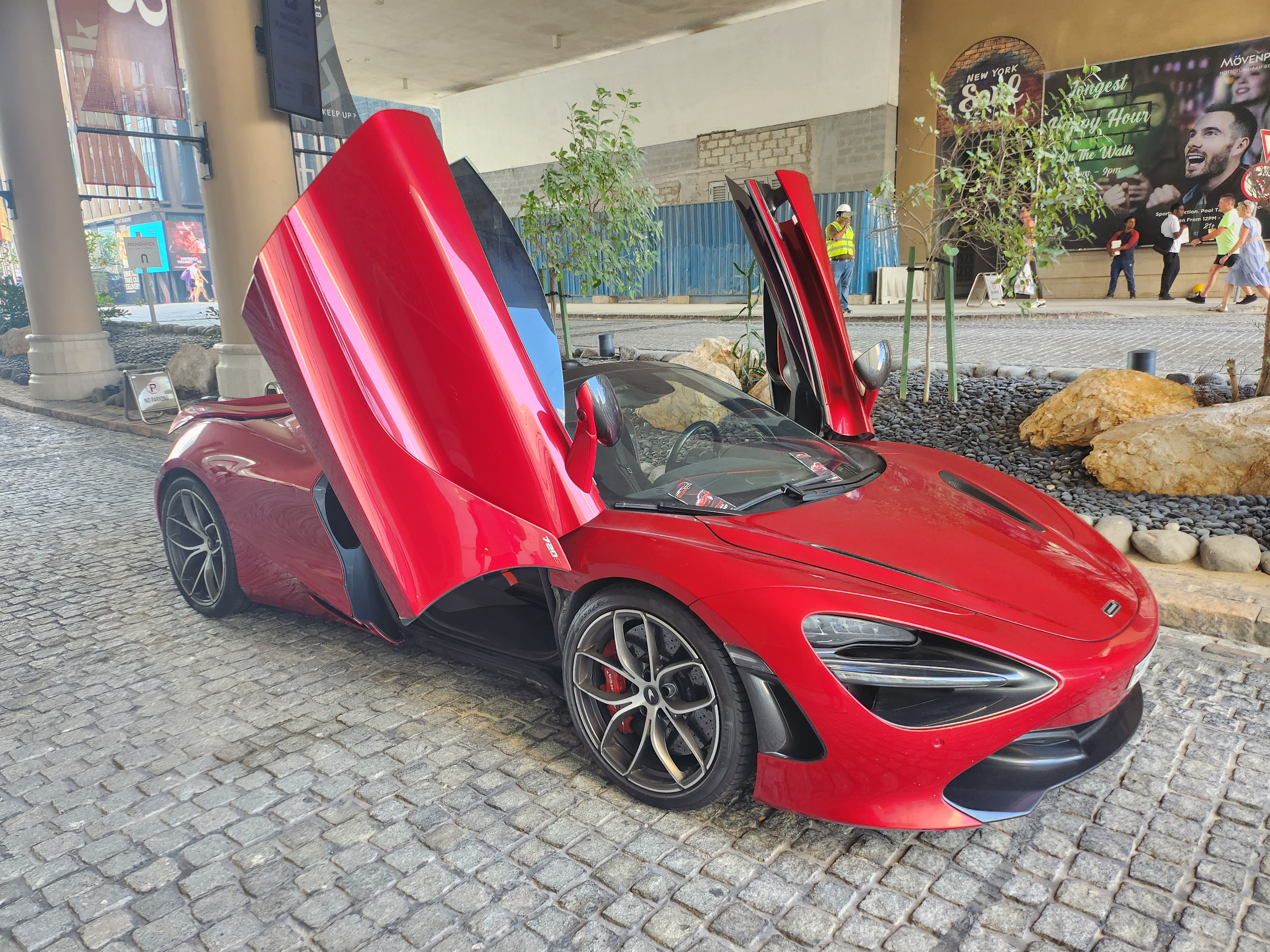
Supercar rental in JBR Beach

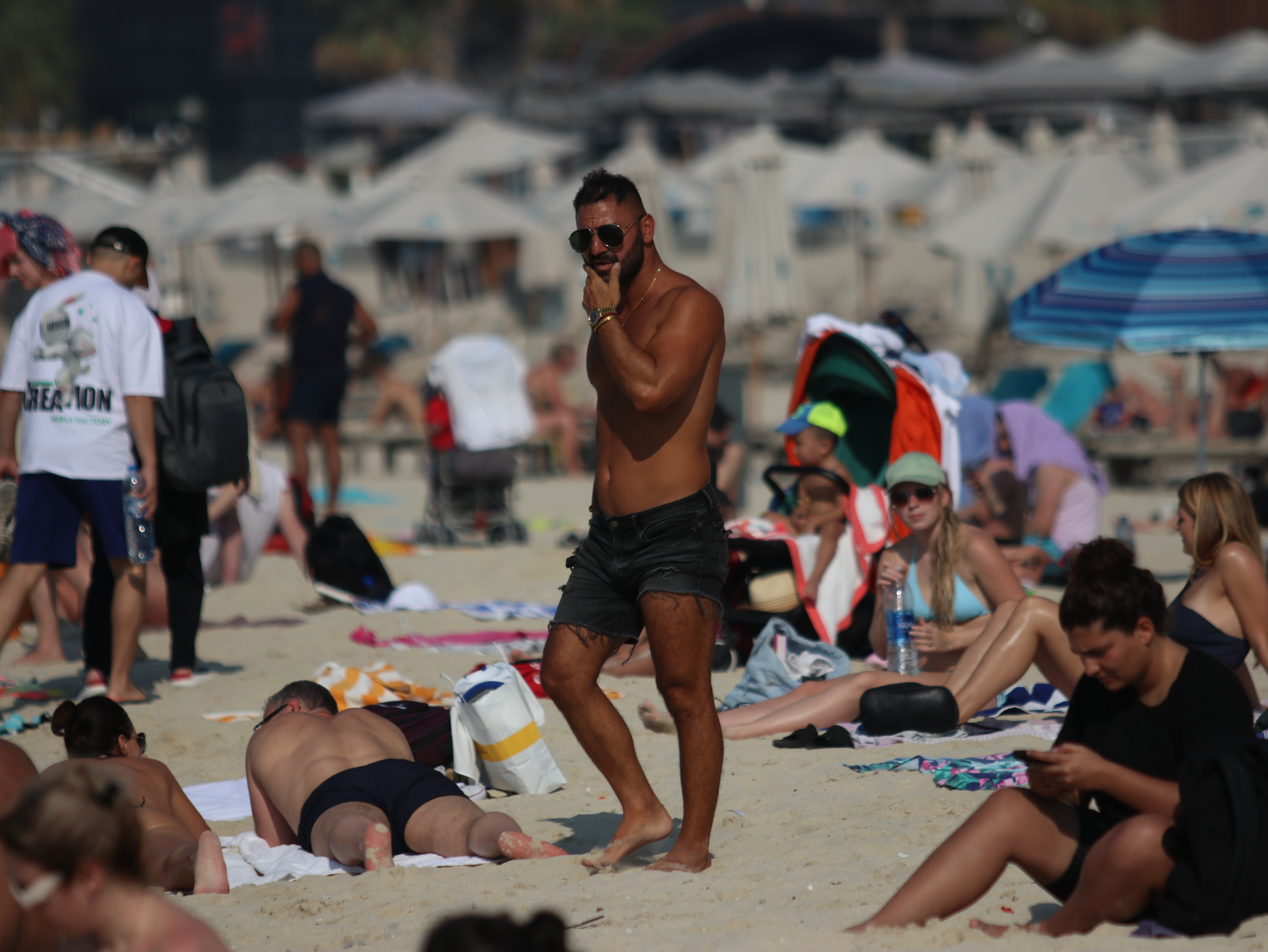
Sunbathers in JBR Beach

== See also ==
- Jumeirah Beach, to the northeast
