= Bluewaters Island =

Artificial island in Dubai, United Arab Emirates

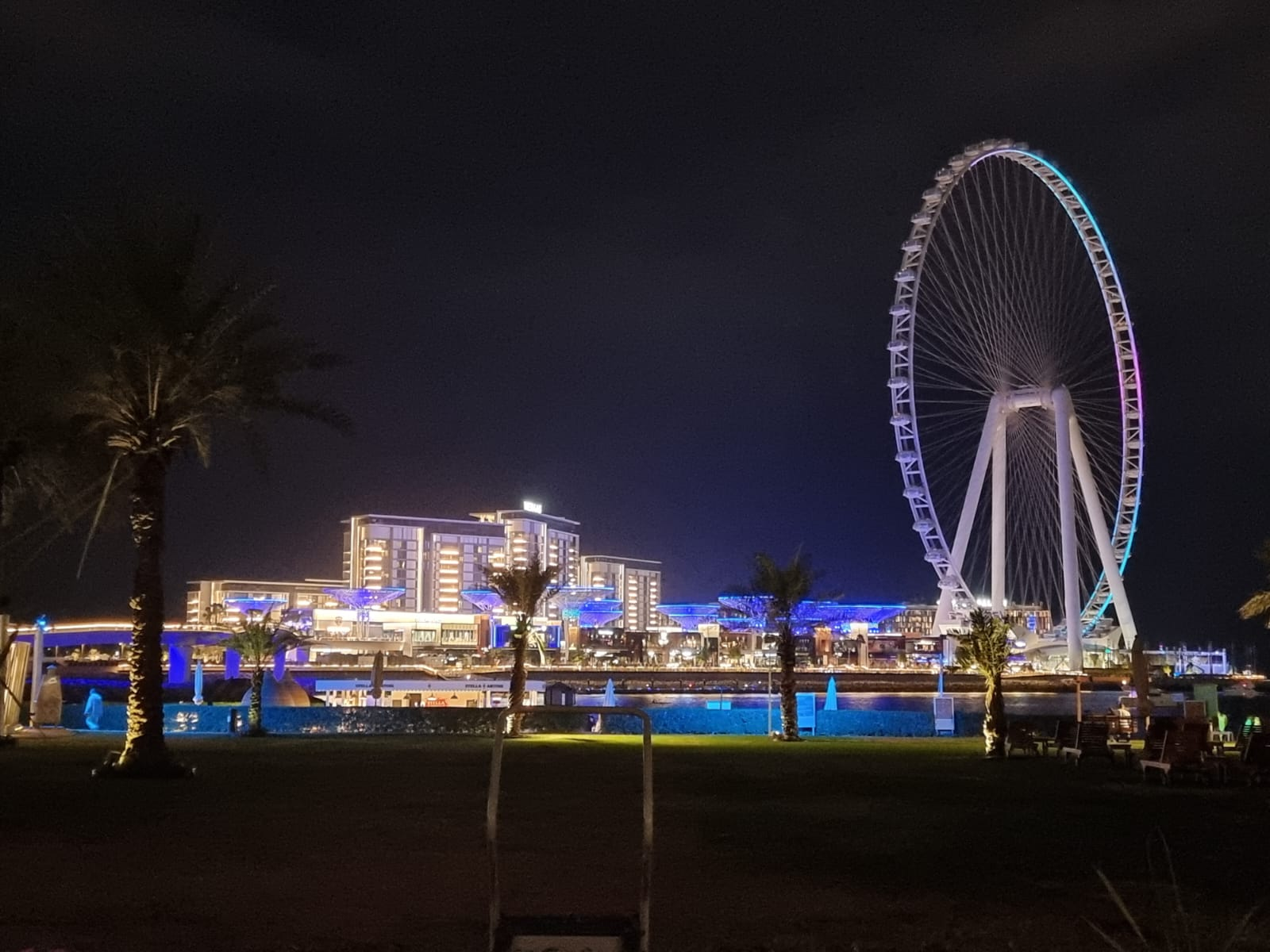
- Bluewaters and Ain Dubai seen from Jumeirah Beach

General information
- Location: Jumeirah Beach Residence coastline, near Dubai Marina, Dubai, United Arab Emirates
- Coordinates: 25.07981°N 55.12206°E
- Construction started: April 2013
- Inaugurated: November 2018
- Cost: AED 6 billion

Bluewaters Island is an artificial island 400 metres (1,300 ft) off the Jumeirah Beach Residence coastline, near Dubai Marina, in Dubai, United Arab Emirates.

Bluewater Island is a popular tourist attraction destination in Dubai. The island is home to Ain Dubai and Madame Tussauds Dubai.

== History ==
The project was approved by Mohammed bin Rashid Al Maktoum, Vice President and Prime Minister of the UAE and Ruler of Dubai, and unveiled on February 13, 2013. It is built on reclaimed land by Meraas Holding, with dredging work conducted by Van Oord, at an estimated cost of AED 6 billion ($1.6 billion USD). Construction was originally due to start in April 2013, but actually began on May 20, 2013. It opened in November 2018.

The island includes entertainment, hospitality, residential, and retail zones, and is forecast to attract more than three million visitors annually.

== Ain Dubai ==
Bluewaters Island has the Ain Dubai, a 250-metre (820 ft) tall giant Ferris wheel. It is the world's tallest Ferris wheel since October 2021, taller than the previous world's tallest Ferris wheel,167.6 m (550 ft) High Roller, which opened in Las Vegas in March 2014, and 177.5 m (582 ft) taller than the 225.5 m (740 ft) New York Wheel planned for Staten Island.

Design and construction were undertaken by Hyundai Contracting and Starneth Engineering. Construction was originally due to begin in June 2013, but did not actually start until May 2015.

The wheel carries 1,400 passengers, in its 48 capsules, and provide views of Dubai Marina and landmarks such as Burj Al Arab, Palm Jumeirah. The first passenger capsule was installed on August 21, 2020.

== Madame Tussauds Dubai ==
The first Madame Tussauds in the Middle East opened in Dubai in September 2021. The wax figures are featured in a theme settings such of Music Party, Fashion, Leaders, Bollywood, Film, Sport and Media, Is features over 90 wax models.

Notable waxwork in the museum include Emirati first leaders Sheikh Zayed and Emirati second leaders Sheikh Khalifa, as well as global celebrities like Virat Kohli, Anushka Sharma, Maria Sharapova, Angelina Jolie, Aishwarya Rai, Ranveer Singh, Cate Blanchett, Johnny Depp, Shahid Kapoor, Shawn Mendes and Justin Timberlake. In 2022, a figure of the flight attendant for Emirates, was added and is the second figure to be made of the icon. A year later, the waxwork Indian Prime Minister Narendra Modi and Russian President Vladimir Putin was also added.
