= Madame Tussauds Dubai =

Wax-work museum in Dubai, United Arab Emirates

Coordinates: 25.07904°N 55.12309°E

- Location: Bluewaters Island, Dubai, United Arab Emirates
- Type: Wax museum
- Collection size: More than 60 wax figures
- Website: https://www.madametussauds.com/dubai/

Madame Tussauds Dubai is a Madame Tussauds museum located in Bluewaters Island in Dubai, United Arab Emirates. It is the first and the only Madame Tussauds museum in the Middle East. It exhibits over 60 life-like wax figures of musicians, actors, athletes, and world leaders. The museum opened in 2021.

== Background ==
Madame Tussauds is a global brand with museums in major cities around the world. In 1835, the original Madame Tussauds was established by the French wax sculptor Marie Tussaud in London. At present, Madame Tussaud's museums are spread across four continents, encompassing Europe, Asia, Australia, and North America.

== History ==
Madame Tussauds Dubai opened in October 2021 as the 23rd Madame Tussauds museum in the world.

== Figures ==
A-List Music Party	Fashion	Leaders	Bollywood and Tollywood	Film	Sport	Media
Kadim Al Sahir	Zendaya	Elizabeth II	Salman Khan	Spider-Man	Lewis Hamilton	Ahmed Fahim
Balqees Ahmed Fathi	Cara Delevingne	Xi Jinping	Katrina Kaif	Audrey Hepburn	Sachin Tendulkar	Kris Fade
Justin Timberlake	David Beckham and Victoria Beckham	Narendra Modi	Shah Rukh Khan	Jennifer Lawrence as Katniss Everdeen	Cristiano Ronaldo	Hassan El Shafei
Lady Gaga	Kylie Jenner	Donald Trump	Kareena Kapoor Khan	Jackie Chan	Lionel Messi	Carla DiBello
Taylor Swift	Kendall Jenner	Melania Trump	Hrithik Roshan	Vin Diesel	Muhammad Ali	Bin Baz
Justin Bieber	Huda Kattan and Mona Kattan	Benazir Bhutto	Deepika Padukone	John Travolta	Yasser Al-Qahtani	
Miley Cyrus	Elie Saab	Mahatma Gandhi	Allu Arjun	Tom Cruise	Virat Kohli	
Ed Sheeran	Anna Wintour	Madame Tussaud	Aishwarya Rai	Marilyn Monroe	Sergiu Toma	
Rihanna	Harry Styles		Ranveer Singh	Travis Fimmel as Anduin Lothar	Conor McGregor	
Pharrell Williams	Shawn Mendes		Anushka Sharma		Amna Al Haddad	
Nancy Ajram			Shahid Kapoor		Mohamed Salah	
Maya Diab			Madhuri Dixit		Serena Williams	
Dwayne Johnson			Ranbir Kapoor			
Mohammed Assaf			Amitabh Bachchan			
Majid Al Mohandis			Anil Kapoor			
Michael Jackson						
George Clooney						
Will Smith						
Kate Winslet						
Chris Hemsworth						

== See also ==
- Merlin Entertainments
- Madame Tussauds Hong Kong
- Madame Tussauds Shanghai
- Madame Tussauds Sydney
- Madame Tussauds Beijing
- Madame Tussauds Singapore
- Madame Tussauds Delhi
