= High Roller (Ferris wheel) =

Giant ferris wheel on the Las Vegas Strip

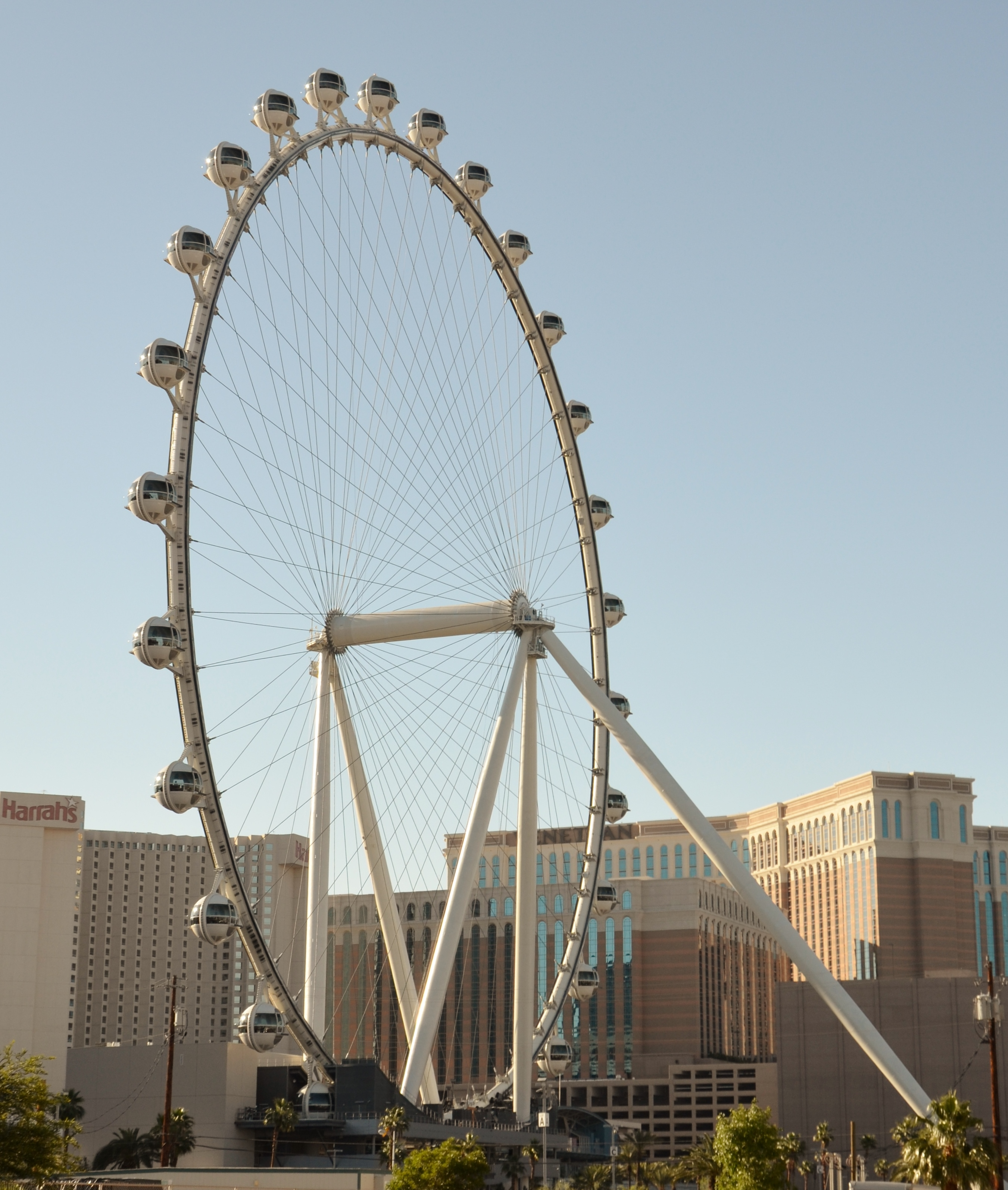
- High Roller in 2015
- Interactive map of the High Roller area

General information
- Status: Operating
- Type: Ferris wheel
- Location: Las Vegas Strip, Paradise, Nevada, U.S.
- Coordinates: 36.117402°N 115.168127°W
- Opening: March 31, 2014; 11 years ago
- Owner: Caesars Entertainment

Height
- Height: 550 feet (167.6 m)

Dimensions
- Diameter: 520 feet (158.5 m)

Design and construction
- Engineer: Arup Engineering

Other information
- Seating capacity: 1120

Website
- caesars.com/linq/high-roller

High Roller is a 550-foot-tall (167.6 m), 520-foot (158.5 m) diameter giant Ferris wheel on the Las Vegas Strip in Paradise, Nevada, United States. Owned and operated by Caesars Entertainment, it opened to the public on March 31, 2014 as the world's tallest Ferris wheel. It is 9 ft (2.7 m) taller than the 541-foot (165 m) Singapore Flyer, which had held the record since 2008. Since October 2021 it is the world's second tallest Ferris wheel after Ain Dubai.

== Design ==
High Roller was announced in August 2011 as the centerpiece of Caesars Entertainment Corporation's $550 million The LINQ. Arup Engineering, which previously consulted on the Singapore Flyer, acted as the structural engineer.

The wheel rotates on a pair of custom-designed spherical roller bearings, each weighing approximately 19,400 lb (8,800 kg). Each bearing has an outer diameter of 7.55 feet (2.30 m), an inner bore of 5.25 feet (1.60 m), and a width of 2.07 feet (0.63 m).

The outer rim comprises 28 sections, each 56 feet (17 m) long. Each section was temporarily held in place during construction by a pair of 275-foot (84 m) radial struts, prior to being permanently secured by four cables.

The passenger cabins (or capsules) are mounted on the wheel's outboard rim and are individually rotated by electric motors to smoothly maintain a horizontal cabin floor throughout each full rotation. Preliminary designs anticipated 32 passenger cabins, each with a 40-passenger capacity —with the final design accommodating 28 40-person cabins and a total capacity of 1,120 passengers.

Each 225-square-foot (20.9 m^{2}) cabin weighs approximately 44,000 pounds (20,000 kg), has a diameter of 22 feet (6.7 m), includes 300 square feet (28 m^{2}) of glass, and is equipped with eight flat-screen televisions.

At night the wheel is illuminated by a 2,000-LED system which can display a single solid color, differently colored sections, multiple colors moving around the rim, and custom displays for special events and holidays.

== Construction ==
Located on Las Vegas Boulevard, across from Caesars Palace, construction was originally scheduled to begin in September 2011 with a late 2013 completion; subsequently revised to early 2014.

The outer rim of the wheel was completed on September 9, 2013. The first passenger cabin was delivered and installed in November 2013 and the final cabin was installed the following month. After preliminary testing, High Roller's lighting system was illuminated at sunset on February 28, 2014. High Roller opened to the public at 4 p.m. EST on March 31, 2014.

== Ticketing ==
Tickets were originally expected to cost less than $20 per ride, but estimates had risen to "about $25 per person" by mid-2012 then "about $30 per person" in September 2013 news reports.

When High Roller opened to the public in March 2014, tickets for a single 30-minute ride, the time taken for the entire wheel to rotate once, cost $24.95 (daytime) and $34.95 (nighttime). Other ticket options included a $59.95 Express Pass, allowing the holder to skip the line and ride any time.

== Gallery ==
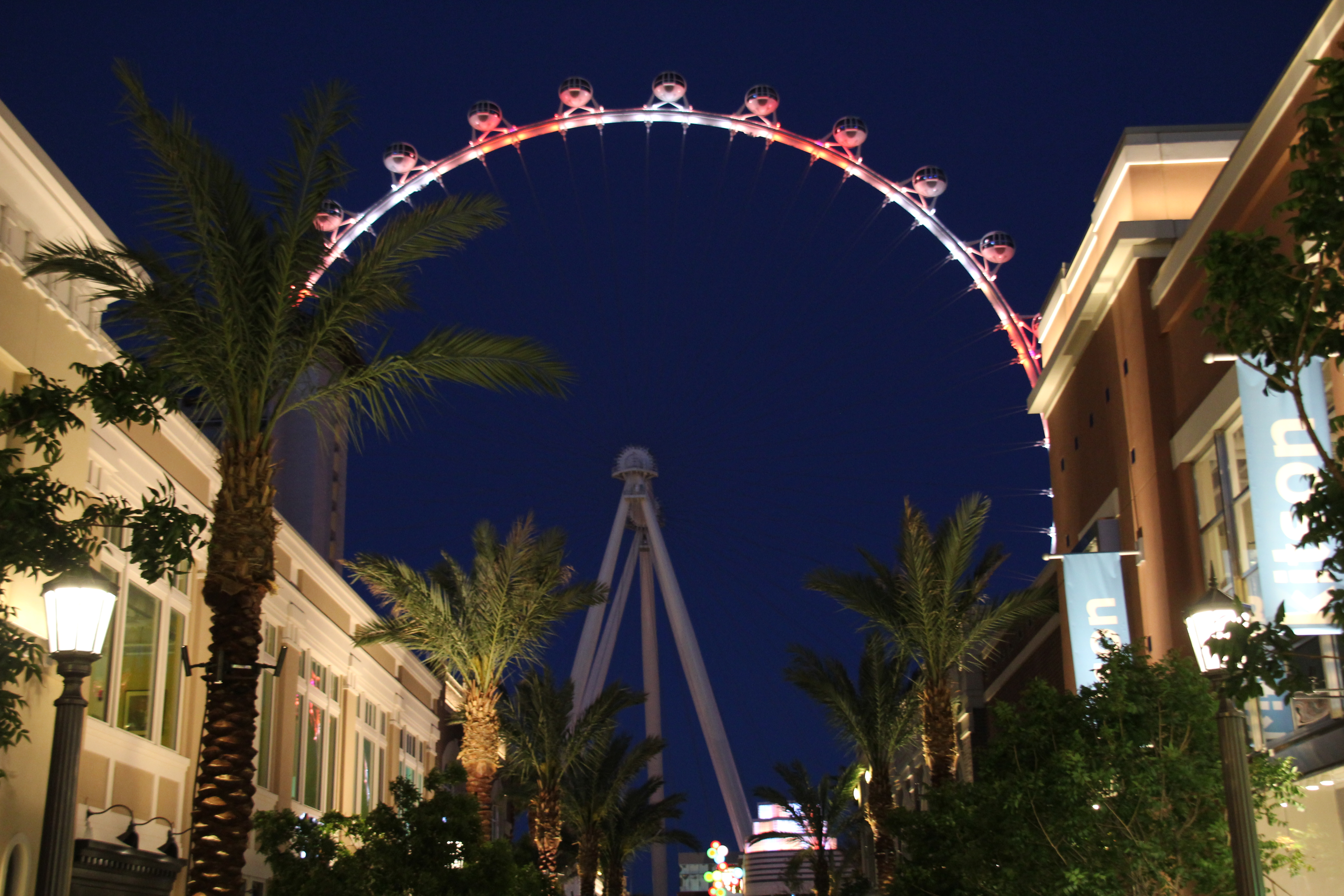
View of High Roller from The Linq in 2014

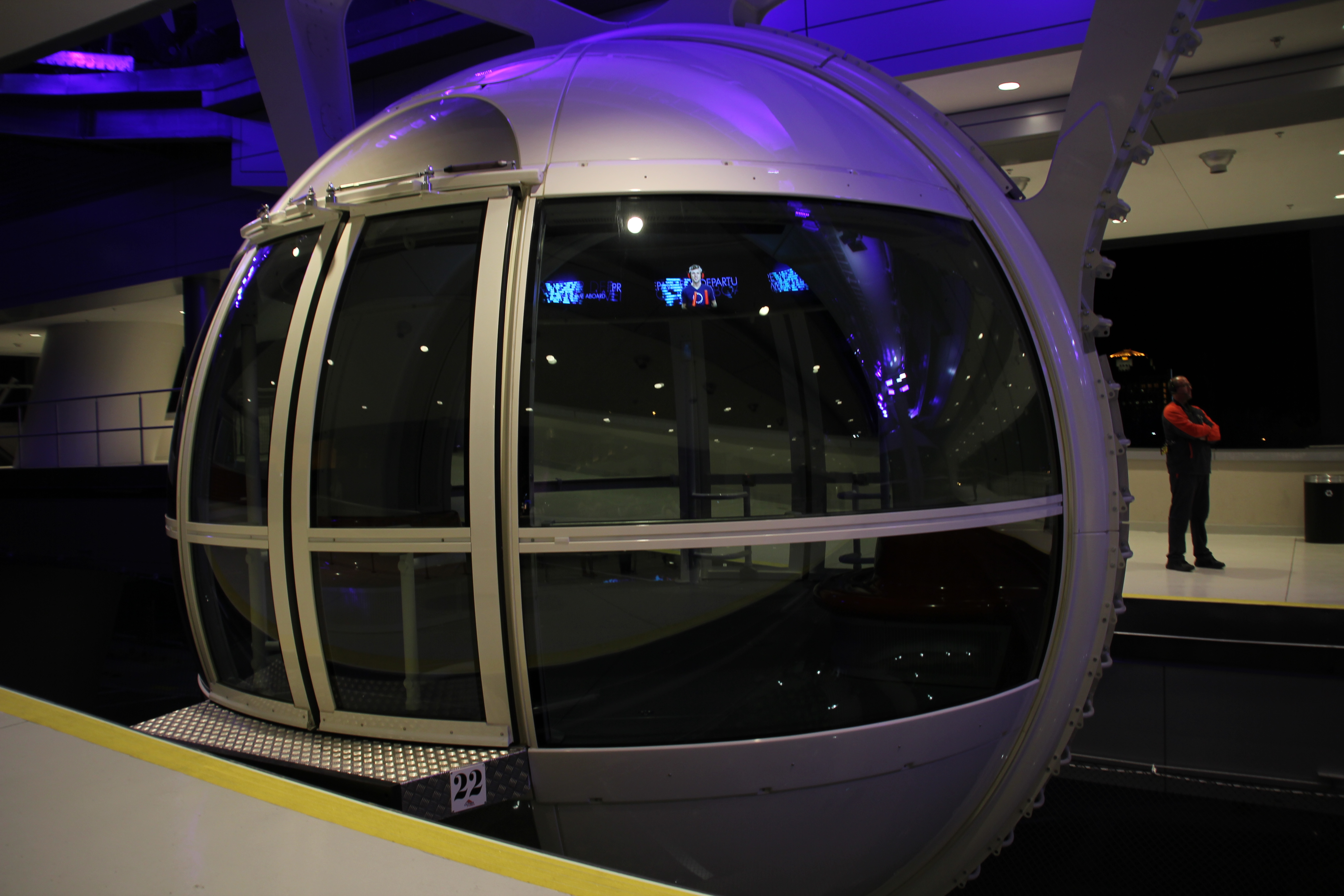
One of the 28 cabins in 2014

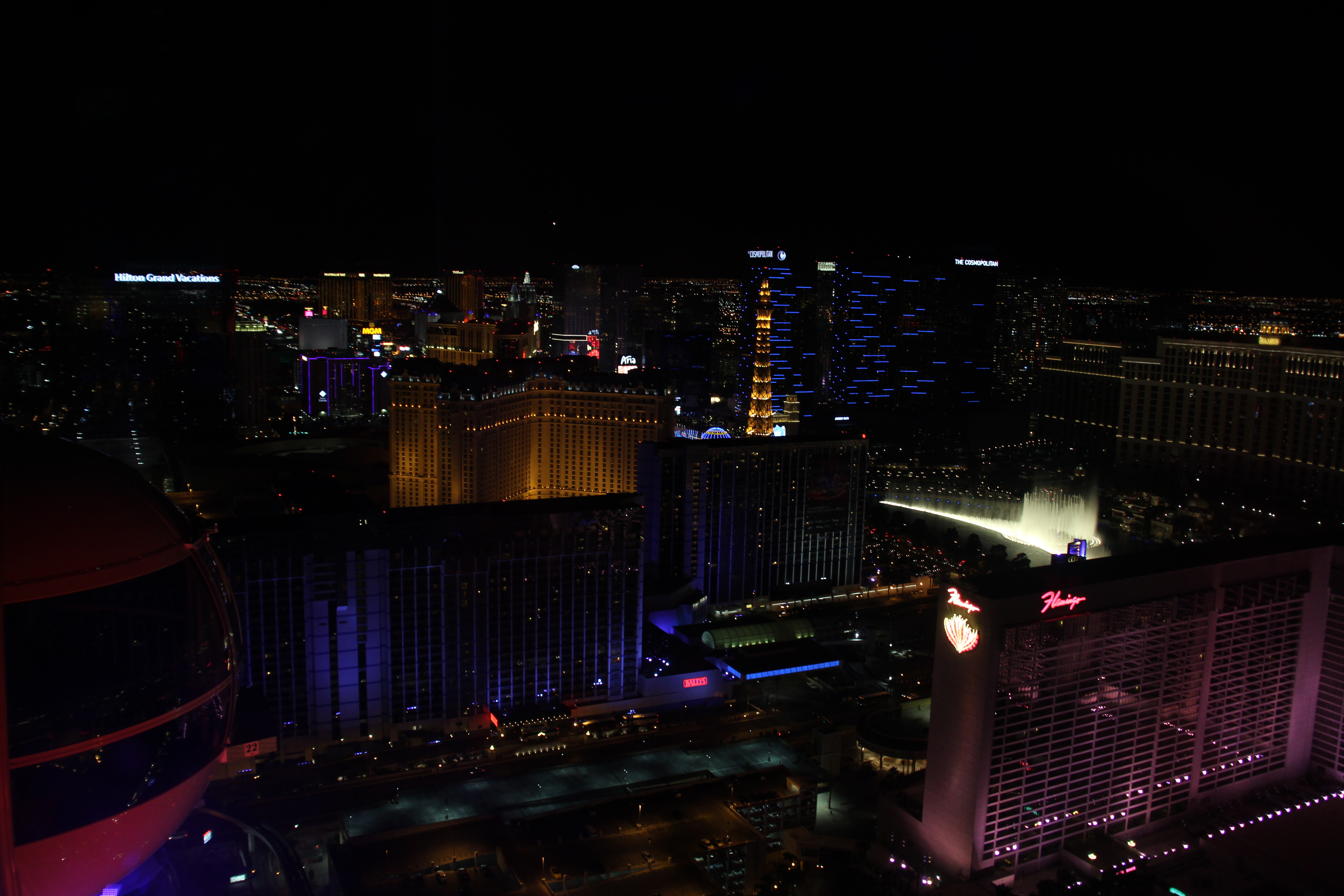
High Roller view of the Las Vegas Strip in 2014

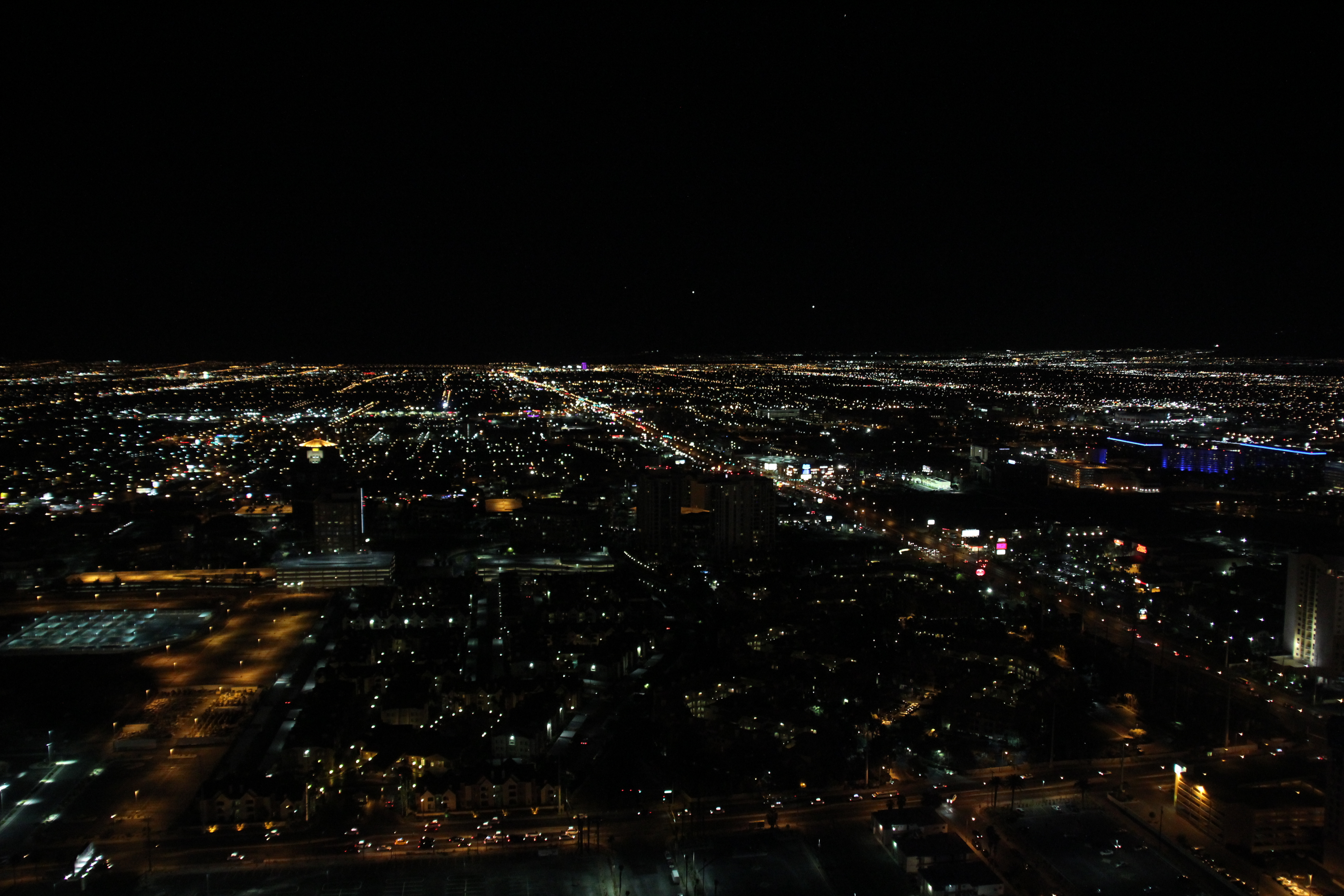
High Roller view looking east in 2014

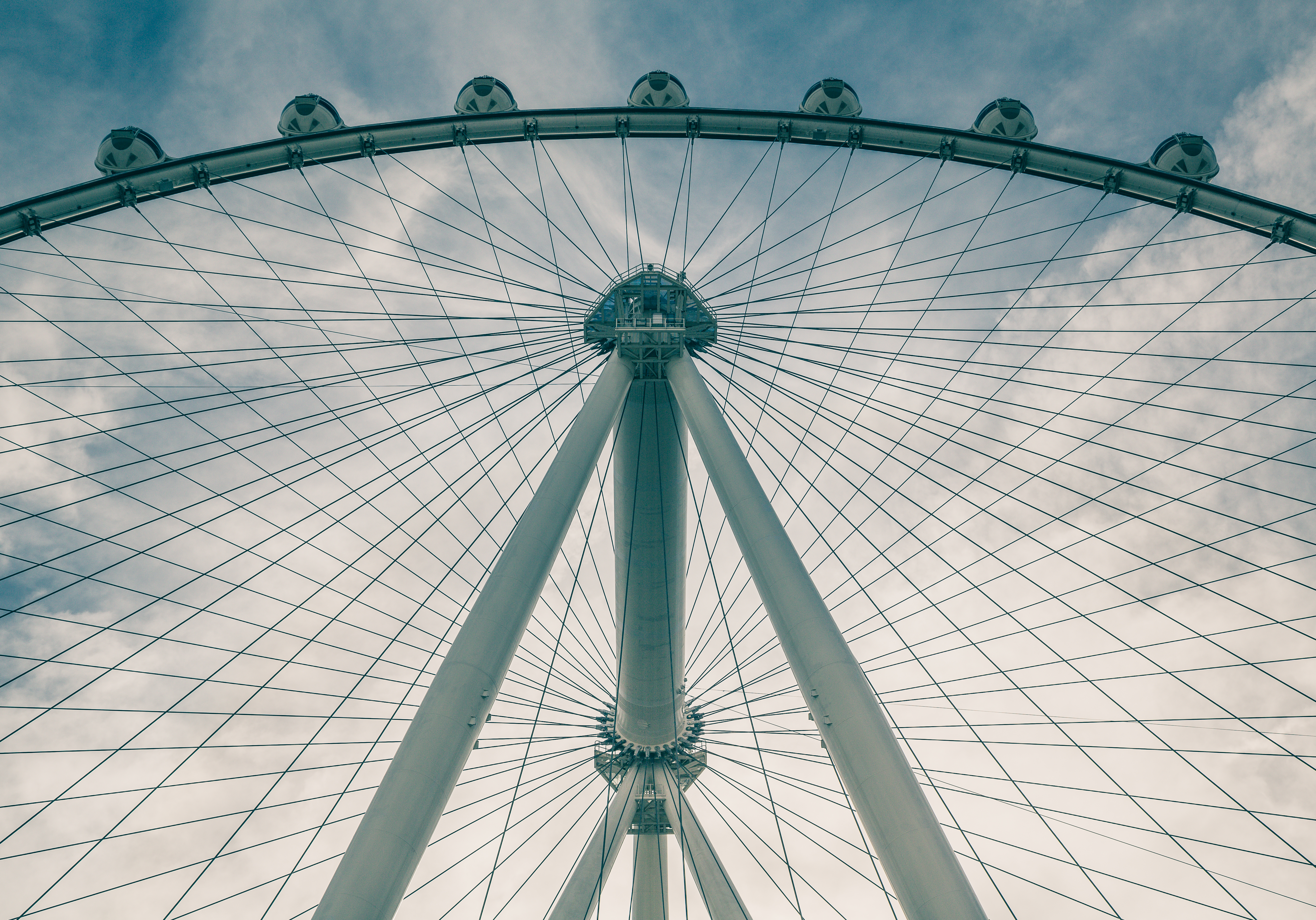
Top of the High Roller from the base in 2015

== See also ==
- High Roller, a former roller coaster atop the Stratosphere Las Vegas tower
- Voyager, a giant Ferris wheel proposed several times for Las Vegas, but never built
- List of tallest buildings and structures in the world

Records
Preceded by Singapore Flyer	World's tallest Ferris wheel 2014–2021	Succeeded by Ain Dubai
