= Amna Al Haddad =

Emirati weightlifter

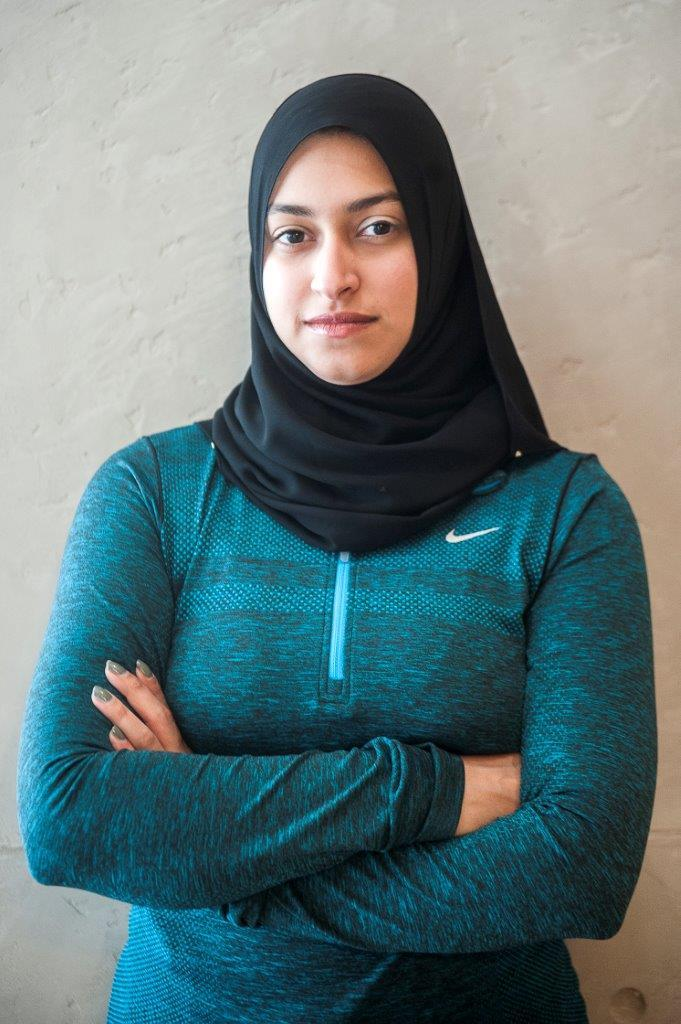
- Born: October 21, 1989 (age 37); Dubai, United Arab Emirates
- Years active: 2007-present
- Height: 5 ft 2 in (157 cm)

Amna Al Haddad (born 21 October 1989) is an Emirati female weightlifting athlete and former journalist.

== Weight Lifting Career ==
Amna Al Haddad was born on October 21, 1989, in Dubai. She started her weightlifting career in 2007 at the age of 19. Her first competitive entrance was in October 2011. Since then she has competed in a number of international competitions. She then became the first Emirati female to compete in the Reebok Crossfit Games Open (February 22 – March 25, 2012) and was ranked 77th out of 170 women in Asia.

Later in May 2012, she joined the Asia Regionals Crossfit Team in Korea. She made history by being the first Emirati and GCC national to compete in the Asia Regionals and the only Muslim woman to do so in a headscarf and a unitard.

She then embarked on Olympic Weightlifting in 2013, in a bid to represent her country at the 2016 Summer Olympics in Rio de Janeiro, Brazil. She competed at the Arnold Sports Festival for three years consecutively and competed in Europe as well.

In April 2015, she competed at the IWF Asian interclub championship and won 6 gold medals and 3 silver in the Arab, West-Asian, and Asian categories as a -63 kg, representing the UAE.

Amna was the first Arab female athlete to signal off We Run Dubai, Nike's 10K race in 2015.

Amna sometimes trains in the Jumeirah neighborhood of Dubai, in a gym housed inside a villa. She trains in a headscarf, fully covered in leggings and compression sleeves.

In 2016, she expressed her hope that her achievements would be an inspiration for other Emirati women. While she was not selected to represent her country in weightlifting at the Rio Olympics, she continues to participate in the sport.
