= Ain Dubai =

World's tallest Ferris wheel in Dubai, UAE

- عين دبي
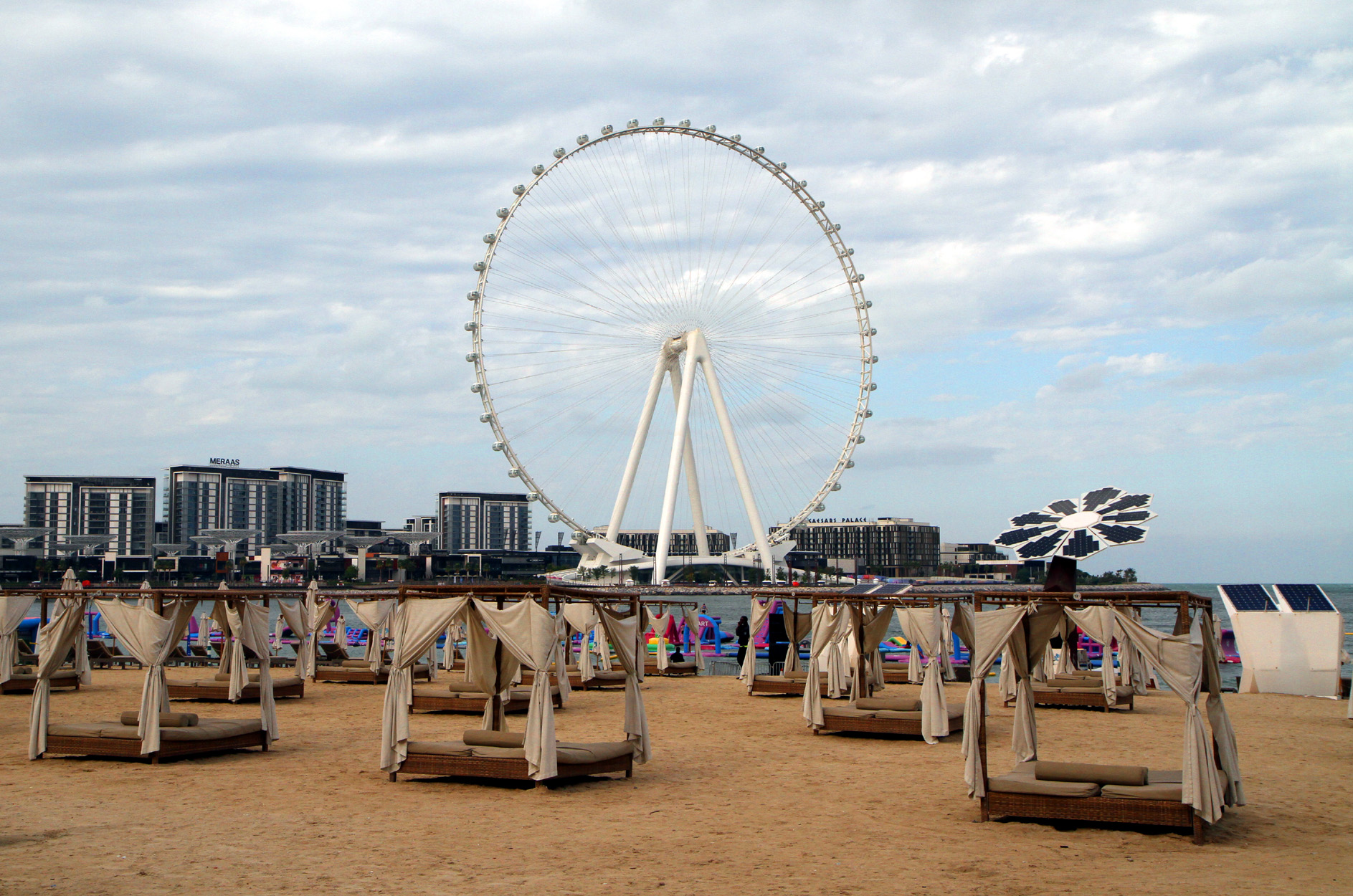
- Ain Dubai seen from Jumeirah Beach

General information
- Type: Observation wheel
- Architectural style: Modern
- Location: Bluewaters Island, Dubai, United Arab Emirates
- Coordinates: 25°04′48.4″N 55°07′26.6″E
- Construction started: May 2015
- Completed: 2021
- Opened: 21 October 2021

Height
- Height: 250 metres (820 ft)

Technical details
- Material: Steel

Design and construction
- Engineer: Hyundai Engineering & Construction; Starneth Engineering

Other information
- Seating capacity: 1,750

Website
- aindubai.com

Ain Dubai (Arabic: عين دبي, lit. 'eye of Dubai') is a giant Ferris wheel located at Bluewaters Island in Dubai, United Arab Emirates. It is the world's tallest observation wheel, at a height of 250 m (820 ft), since October 2021.

Ain Dubai is 82.4 m (270 ft) taller than the previous world's tallest observation wheel, the 167.6 m (550 ft) High Roller, which opened in Las Vegas in March 2014.

The wheel is designed to carry up to 1,750 passengers in 48 cabins and to provide views of Dubai Marina and landmarks such as Burj Al Arab, Palm Jumeirah, and Burj Khalifa.

It is powered by hydraulic motors through 64 rubber tyre friction rollers of 310/80R22.5 size located at the ends of the boarding platform.

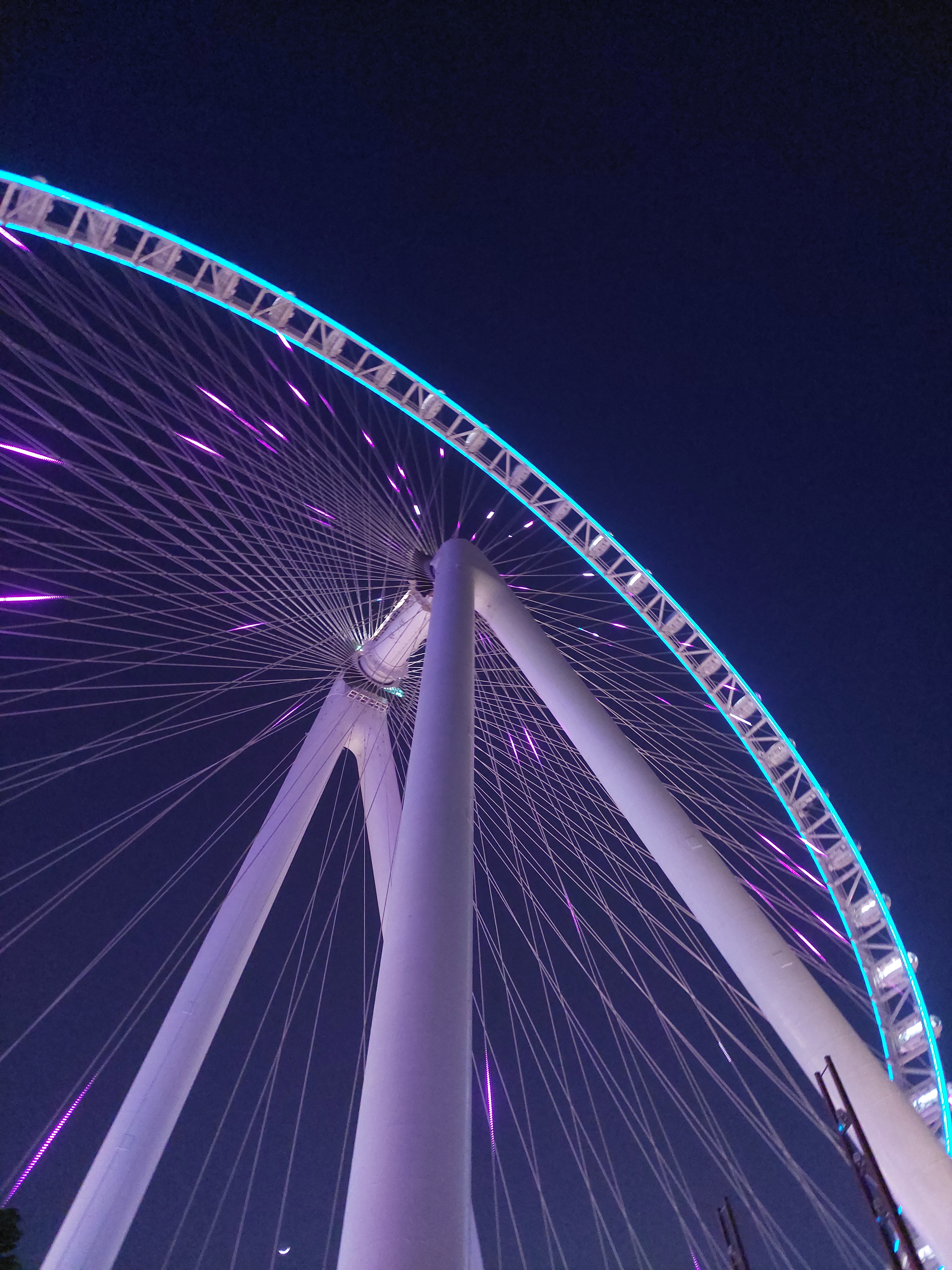
Ain Dubai View

== History ==
Ain Dubai was previously named the Dubai Eye or Dubai-I. It was announced in February 2013.

Hyundai Engineering & Construction and Starneth Engineering were appointed as the primary design and construction contractors, together with KCI, the engineers who designed and engineered the complete wheel structure including the installation engineering. Construction began in May 2015, anticipating completion in early to mid-2019. Further delays pushed the target opening to 20 October 2020, in order to coincide with Expo 2020, but this itself was postponed due to the COVID-19 pandemic. The wheel opened a year later on 21 October 2021.

Ain Dubai closed to the public in March 2022 for "periodic enhancements". In April 2023, the operators announced that the Ain Dubai would remain "closed indefinitely", without any further explanation. The axle of the wheel was at that time surrounded by scaffolding, and the German TÜV Association, which was involved in the Ain's construction, withdrew its safety certification for the structure. However, since July 2023 the LED displays on the structure continued to be illuminated at night and are visible from long distances.

In April 2024, Ain Dubai was seen to be in operation; however, it was still closed to the public. Ain Dubai officially reopened to visitors on 26 December 2024.

== See also ==
- List of tallest buildings and structures in the world

Records
Preceded by High Roller	World's tallest Ferris wheel 2021–present	Succeeded by Incumbent
