= Al Ain Zoo =

Zoo in Abu Dhabi, UAE

- حَدِيْقَة ٱلْحَيْوَانَات بِٱلْعَيْن

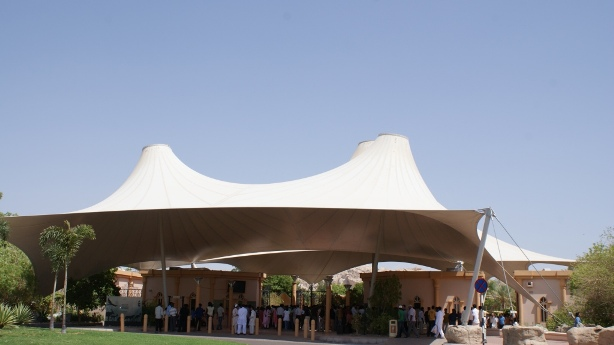
- Al Ain zoo entrance
- Interactive map of Al Ain Zoo
- 24°10′33.89″N 55°44′18.57″E
- Date opened: November 25, 1968; 57 years ago
- Location: Al Ain, Eastern Region of the Emirate of Abu Dhabi, the UAE
- Land area: 400 ha (990 acres)
- Website: www.alainzoo.ae

Al Ain Zoo (Arabic: حَدِيْقَة ٱلْحَيْوَانَات بِٱلْعَيْن, romanized: Ḥadīqat Ḥaywānāt Bil-ʿAyn), also "Al Ain Wildlife Park & Resort" [1] or simply "Al Ain Wildlife Park" (Arabic: مُتَنَزَّه ٱلْعَيْن لِلْحَيَاة ٱلْبَرِيَّة, romanized: Mutanazzah Al-ʿAyn Lil-Ḥayāt Al-Bariyyah),[3] is a 400-hectare (990-acre) zoo located in the foothills of Jebel Hafeet in Al Ain, Abu Dhabi, the United Arab Emirates. It is primarily composed of ungulates and herbivores, such as Arabian antelopes. It also holds oryx, eland, gazelle, and lechwe, as well as the rare white lion and Nubian giraffe. There are 68 species of mammals, 88 species of birds and 35 species of reptiles available in the 50 hectares of zoo houses.

== History and fauna ==
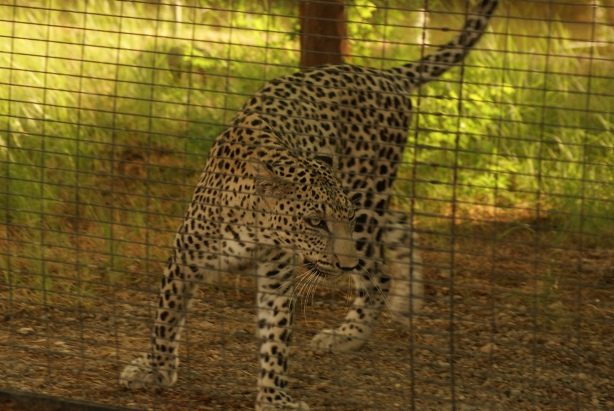
An Arabian leopard. Leopards had been present in the area of Jebel Hafeet in the 20th century.

In 1968 Sheikh Zayed bin Sultan Al Nahyan, the late Ruler of Abu Dhabi and President of the United Arab Emirates joined efforts and decided on founding a national zoo. This decision was born out of their genuine concern of the land's wildlife. In 1969 it was established by Shaikh Zayed Bin Sultan Al Nahyan and in 1972 it opened to the public. Among the species they wanted to protect were ungulates such as the Arabian oryx.

Today, the zoo hosts over 4,000 animals, some of them extinct in the wild, some endangered. It features a big cat house containing lions, mountain lions, jaguars, black panthers, leopards, and cheetahs. In addition, it has a reptile house, monkey compounds, an aquarium, and an aviary. From February 2010 until July 2010, the Al Ain Zoo hosted the "Dinosaur Trail," a small section that includes around 15 to 20 mechanical dinosaurs with sensors, such as Tyrannosaurus rex. It included information about each dinosaur, living habits, natural habitat and basic features.

In April 2019 the zoo began its expansion program in order to build new compounds' areas and sites, such as the conservation and breeding centres, African Safari, World Desert Zoo, and the Sheikh Zayed Desert Learning Centre.

In March 2022, as the zoo intended to import wild African elephants from Namibia, the World Association of Zoos and Aquariums published its thoughts on the matter. They stated that according to their Code of Ethics it is essential from time to time to make such actions. This is needed in light of global efforts of conservation breeding programs, education programs, or basic biological studies. Having said that, they continued their statement that concluded that the zoo's intention to import African elephants does not meet WAZA's Code of Ethics. The outcome of that statement was the decision to terminate Al Ain Zoo membership in WAZA until further notice.

Following that event and statement, on September 15, 2022, the European Association of Zoos and Aquaria (EAZA) also announced the termination of the membership of Al Ain Zoo in the United Arab Emirates. The zoo’s membership ended on December 31, 2022, following the decision of the EAZA Council that EAZA can no longer reasonably be expected to allow the institution to remain a member. The decision comes after careful examination of evidence related to importing wild-caught African elephants from Namibia, which the Council agreed constituted multiple breaches of EAZA Codes and Standards.

On August 14th it was reported that for the first time in years three Arabian sand cats were born in the zoo.

== Gallery ==
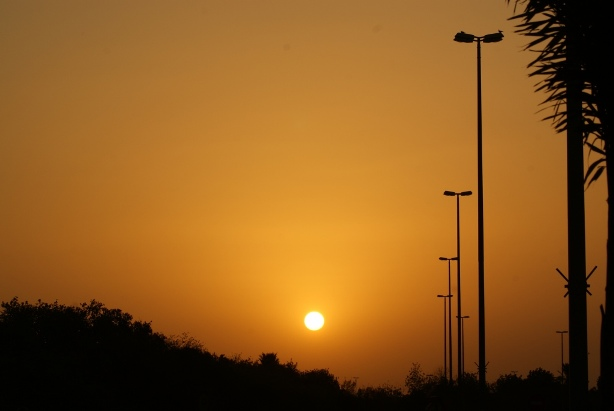
Sunset in front of the zoo's entrance

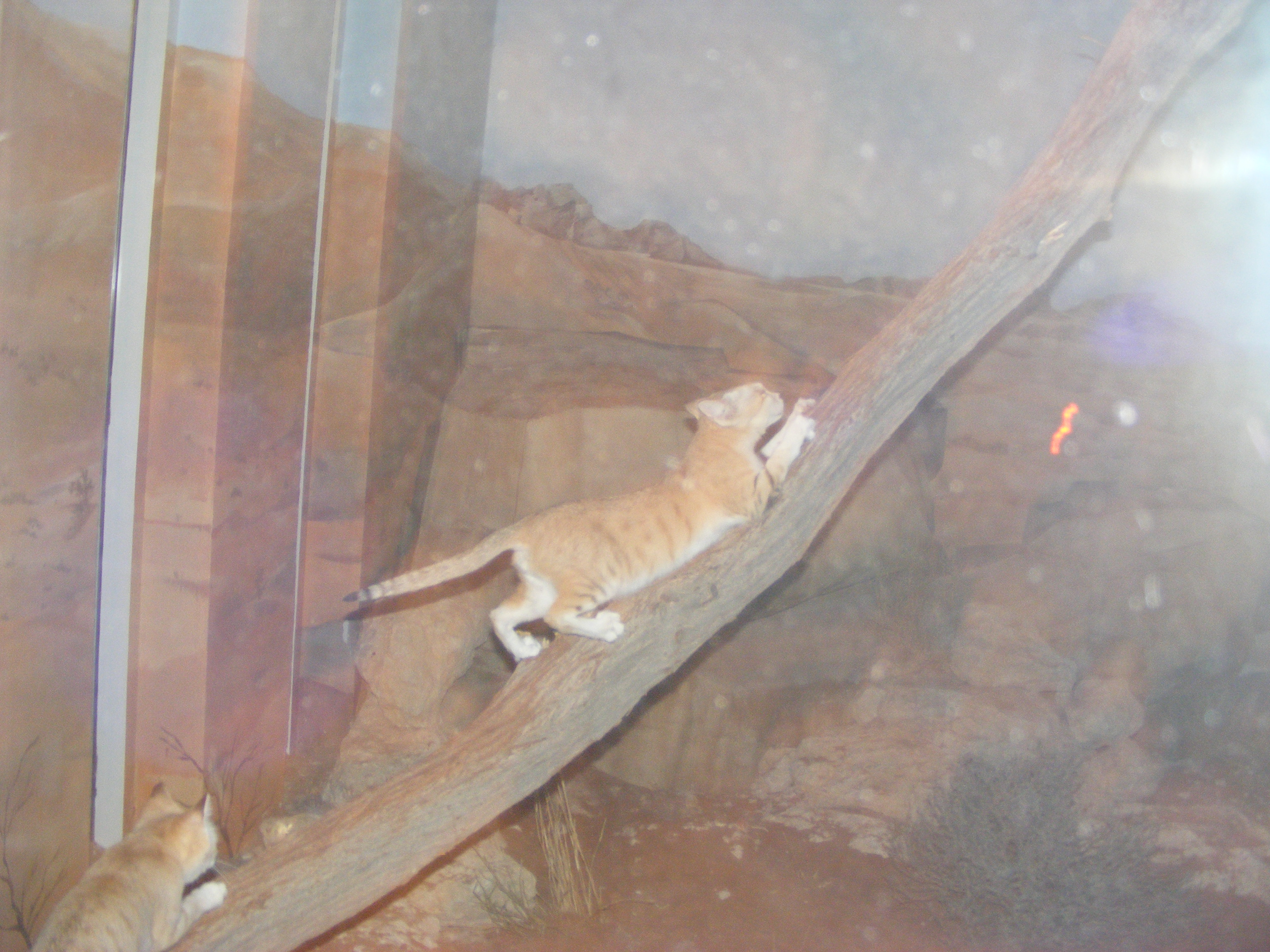
Sand cat, native to the region

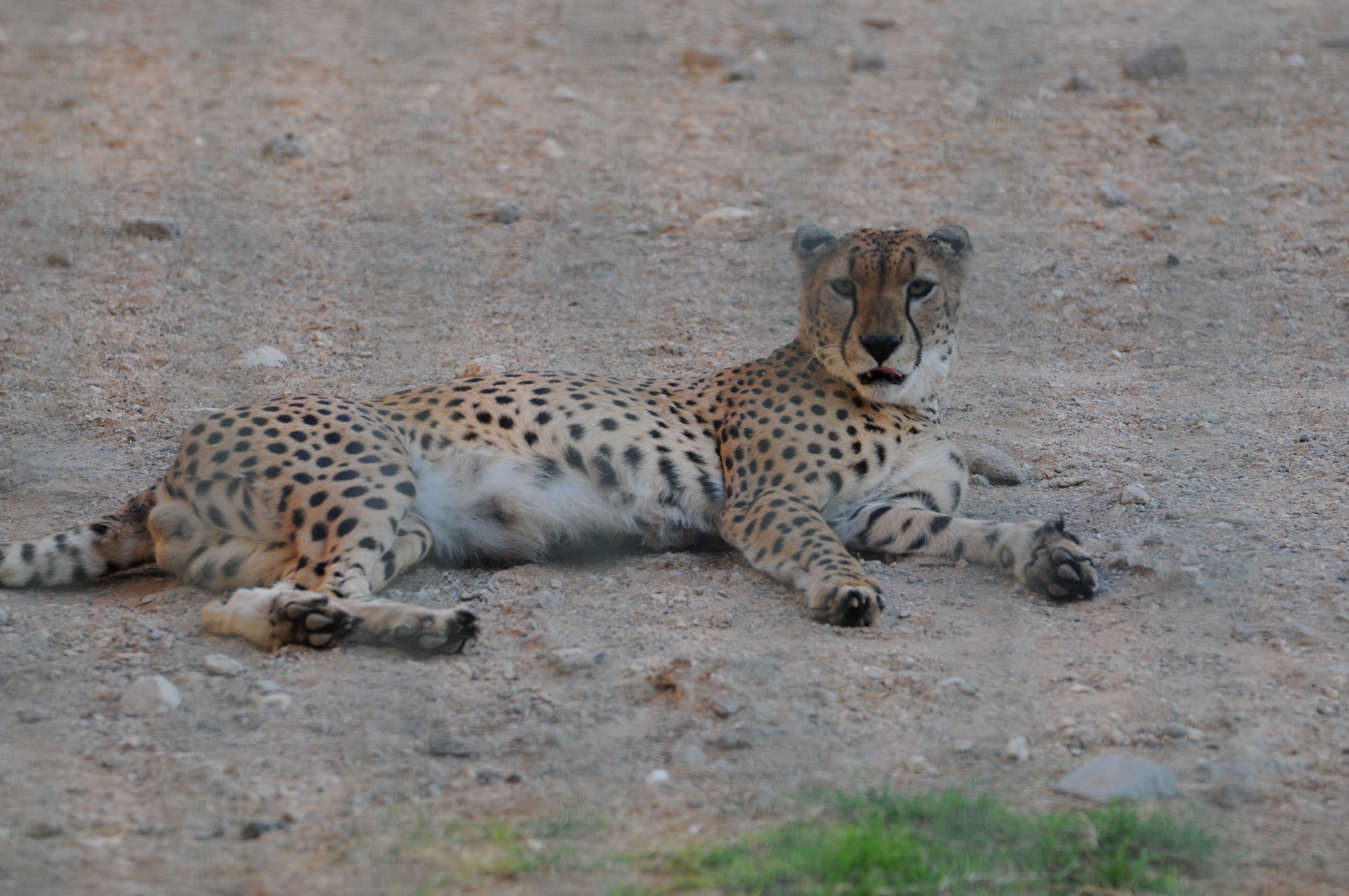
Cheetah

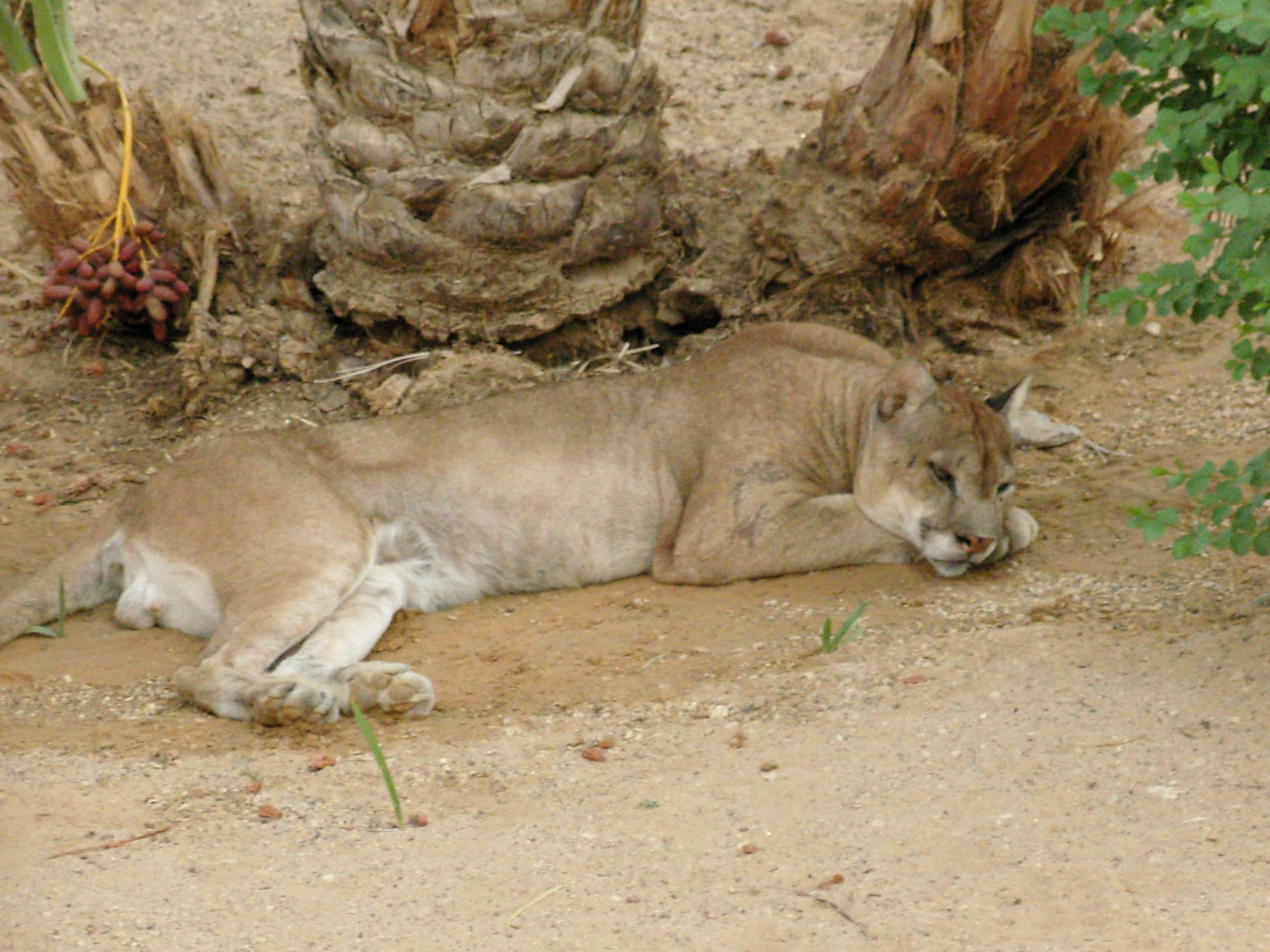
Puma or mountain lion

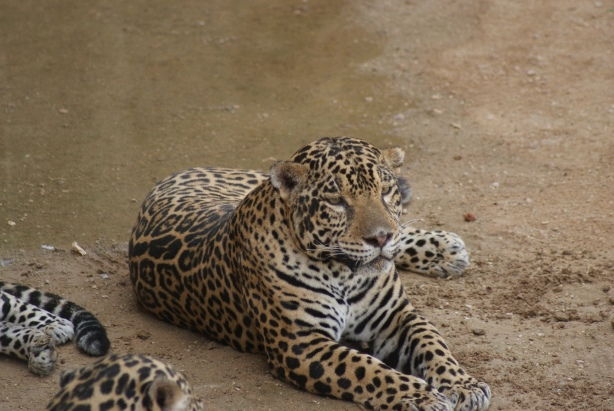
Jaguar

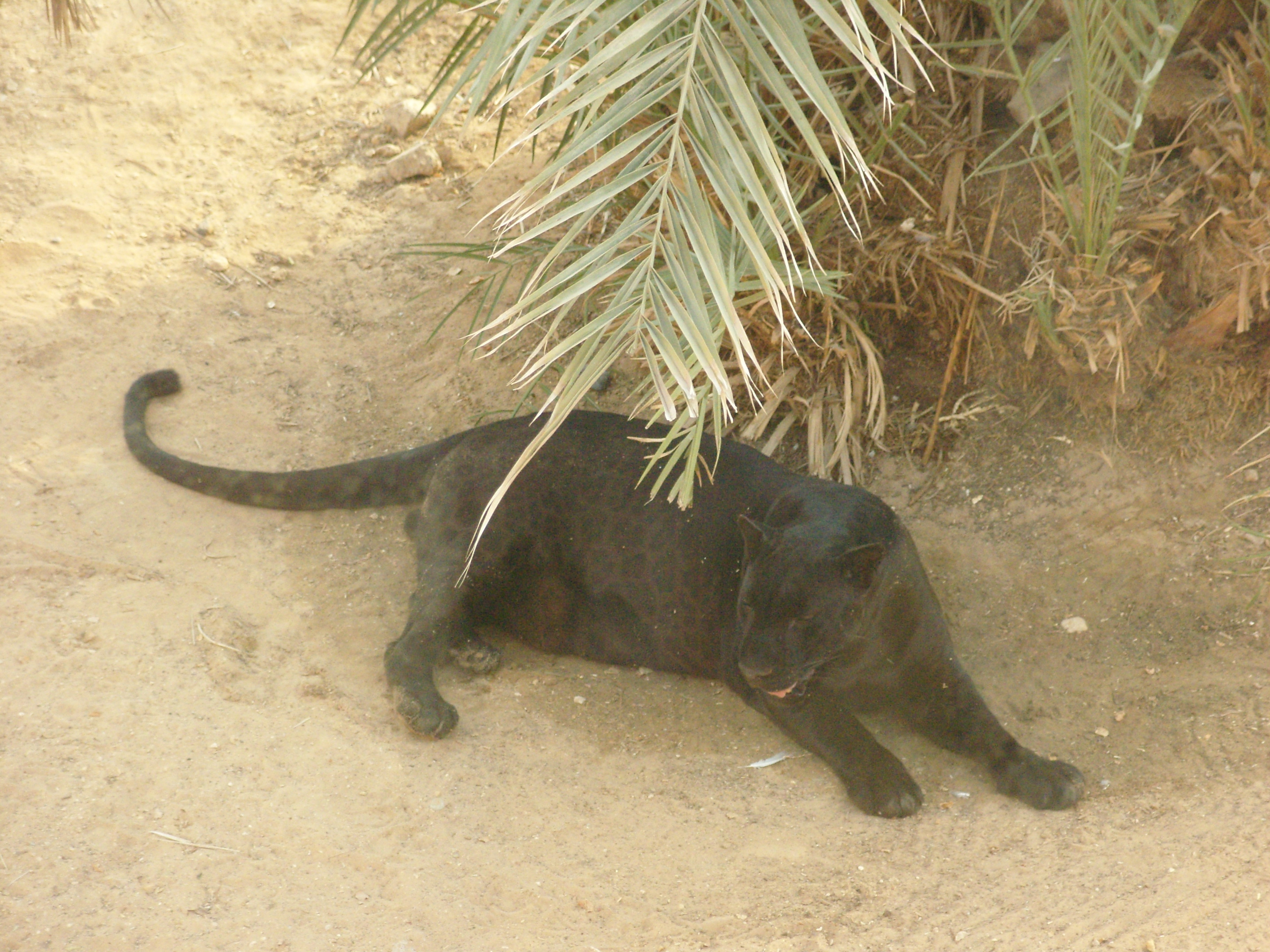
Black panther

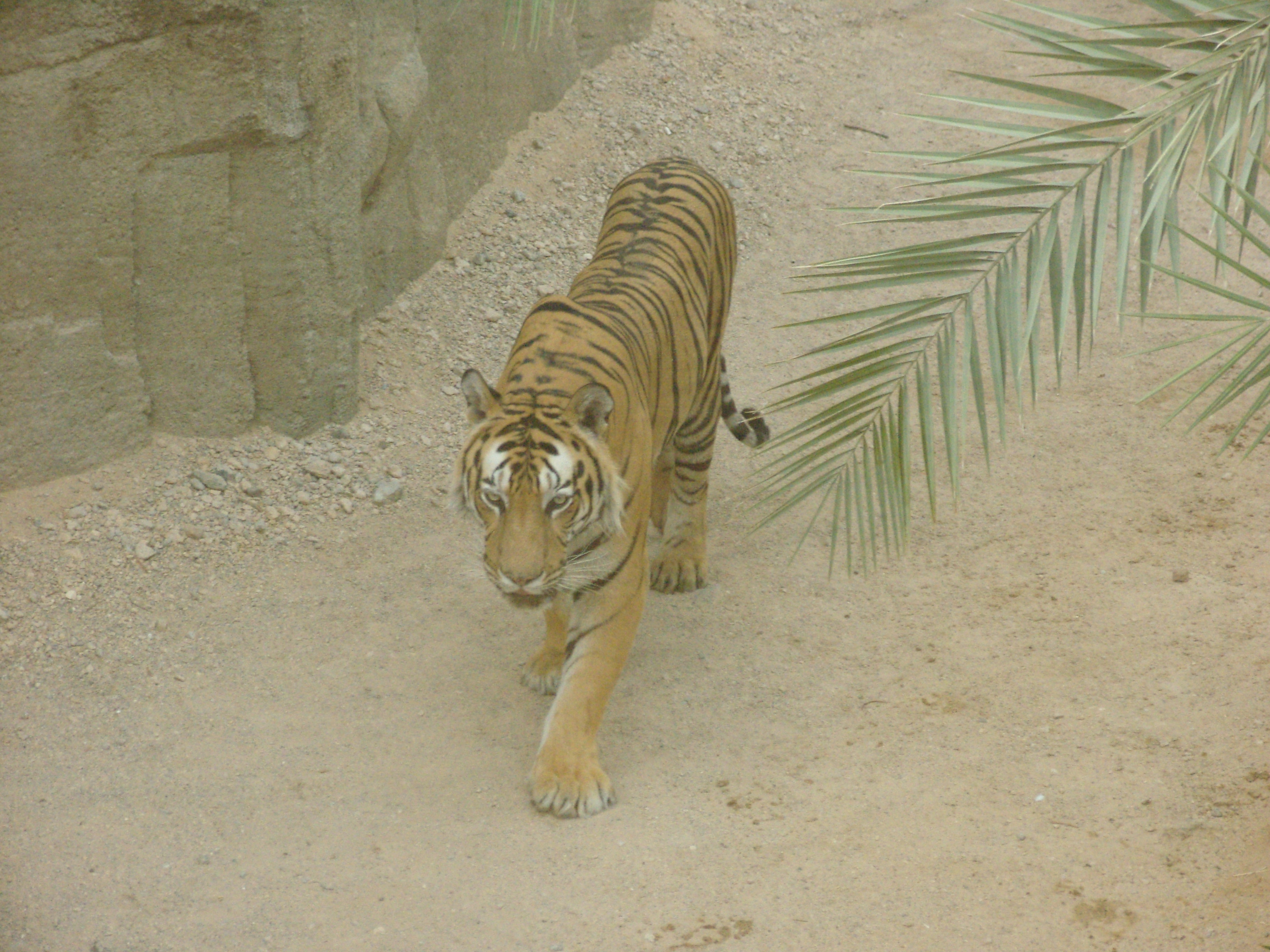
Bengal tiger

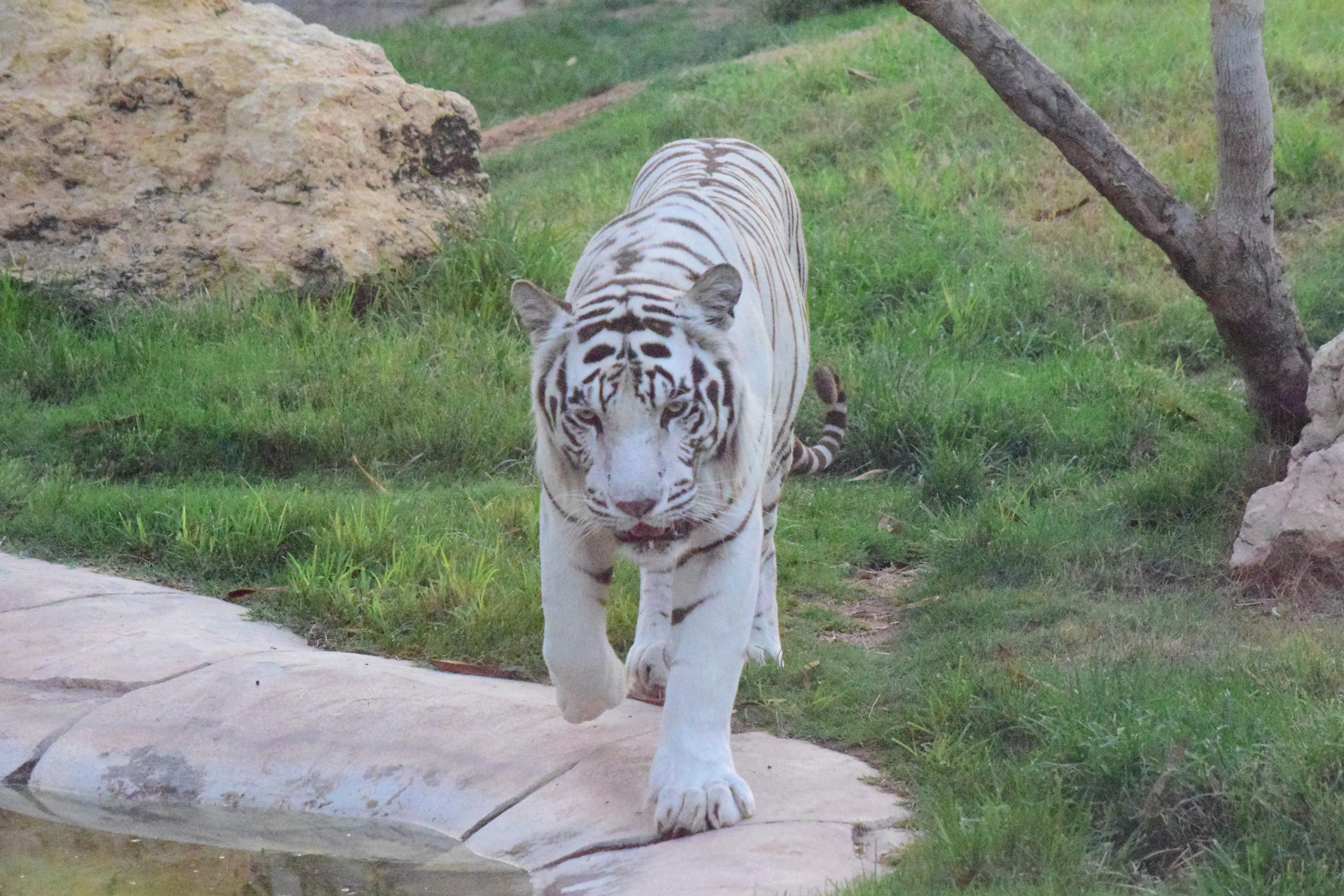
White tiger

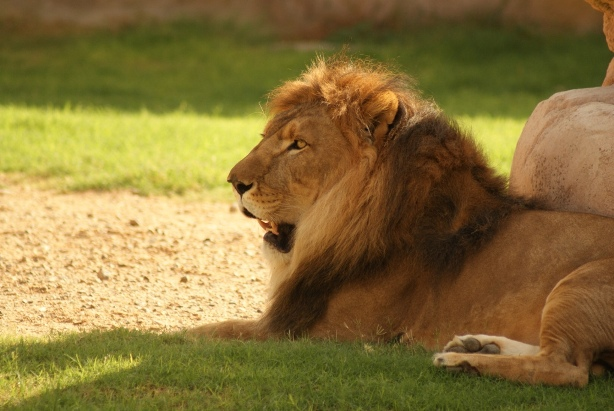
Male lion

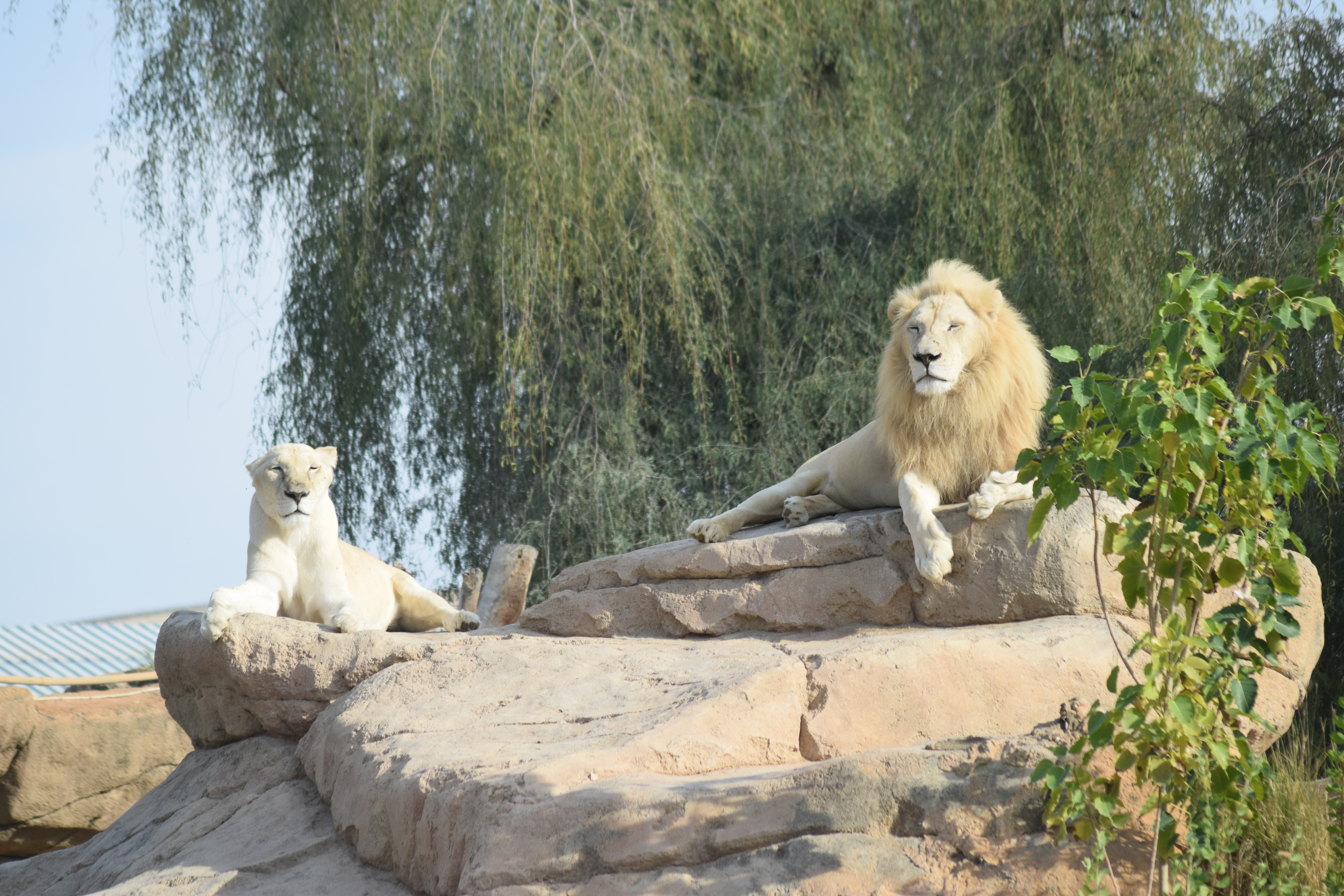
White lions

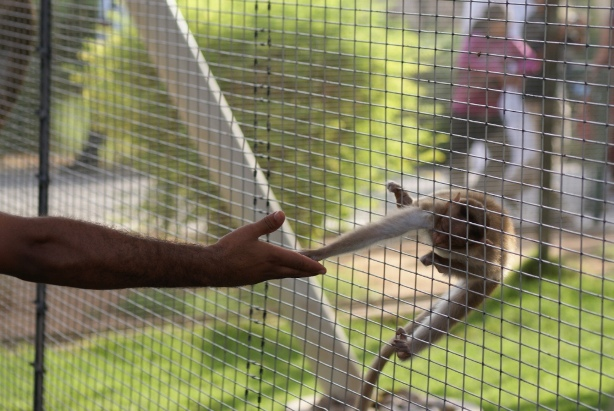
Baby macaque

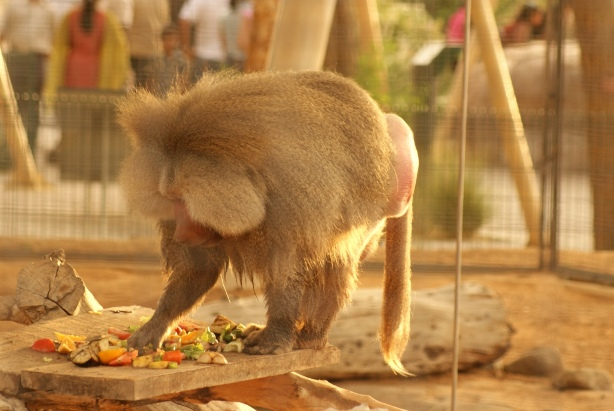
Hamadryas baboon

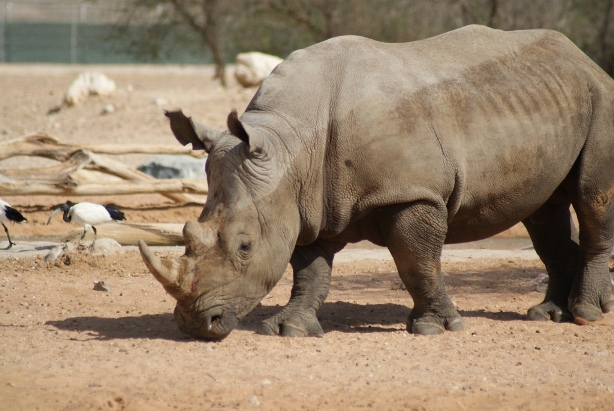
White rhinoceros

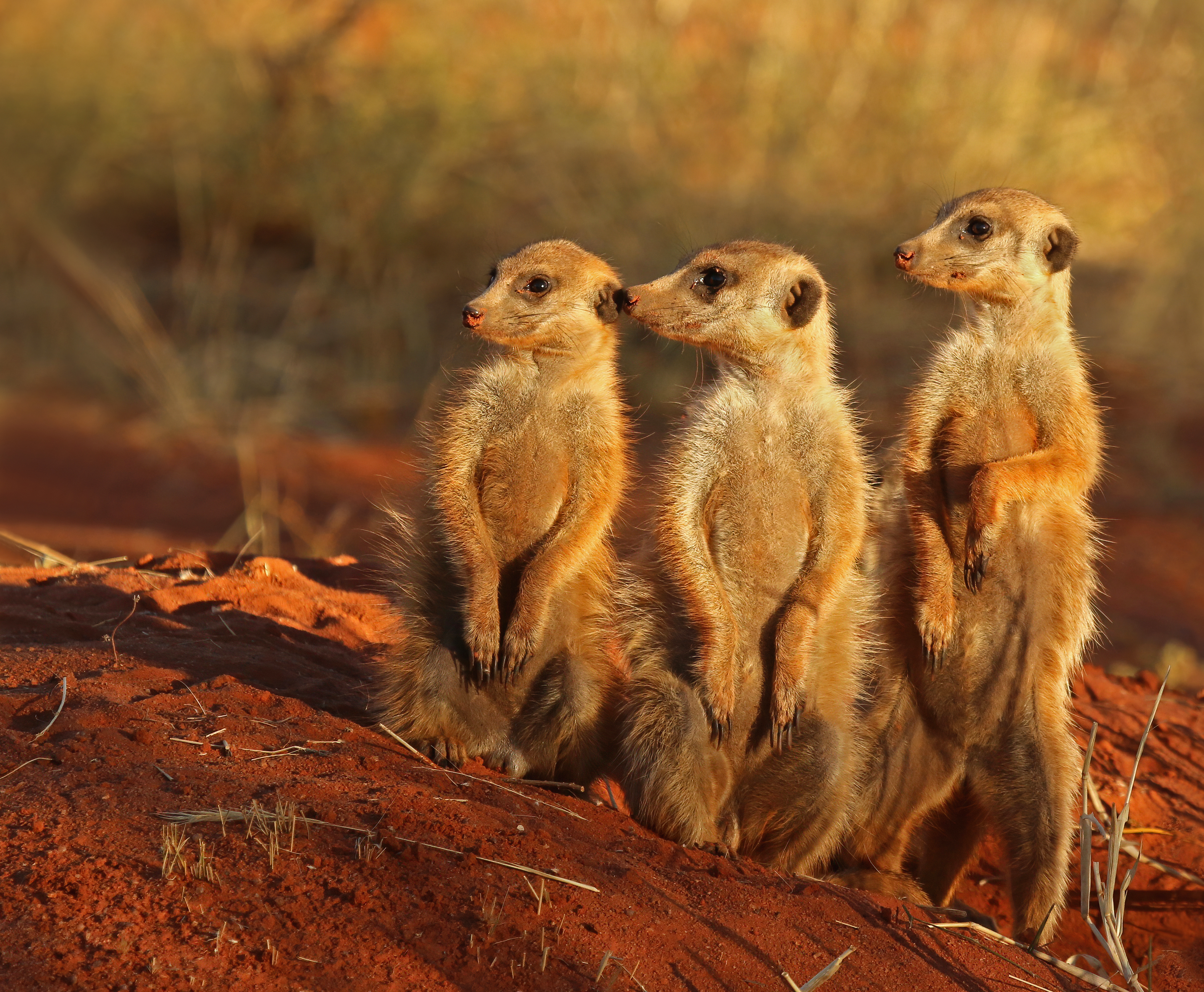
Meerkats

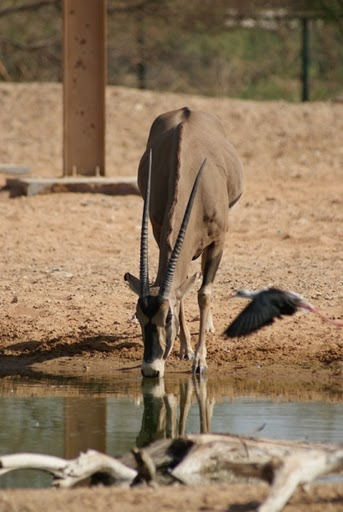
East African oryx

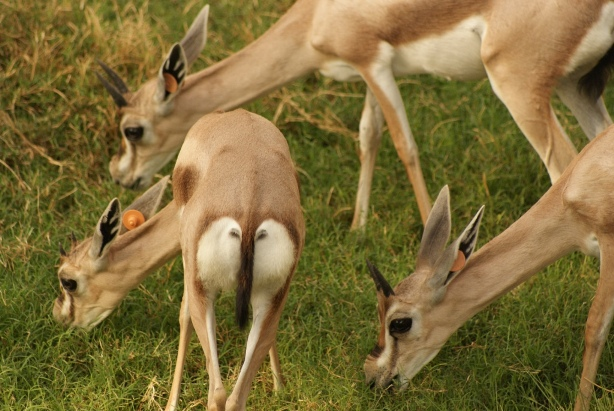
Gazelle with identification tag

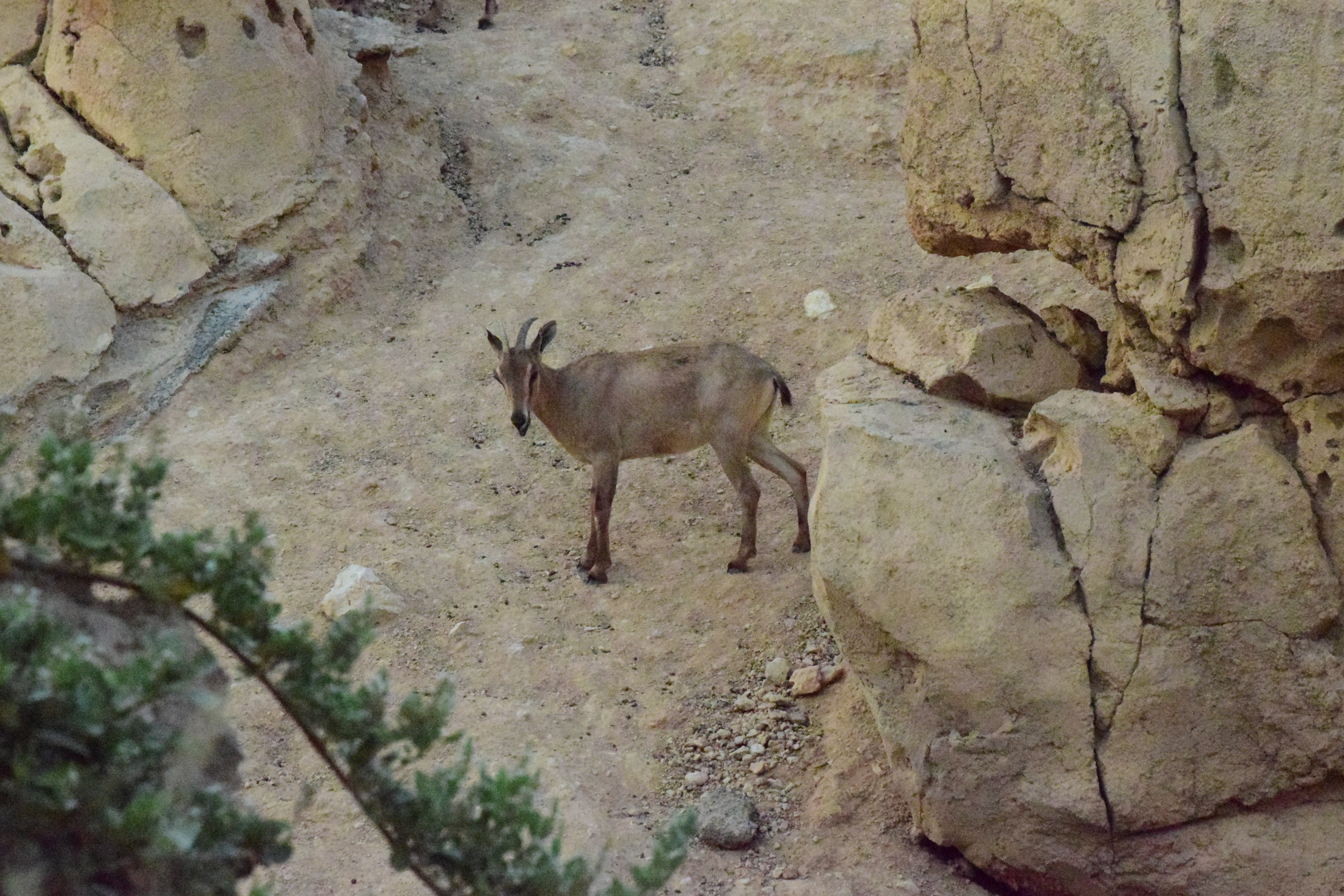
Arabian tahr, which is naturally found in Jebel Hafeet and Al Hajar Mountains

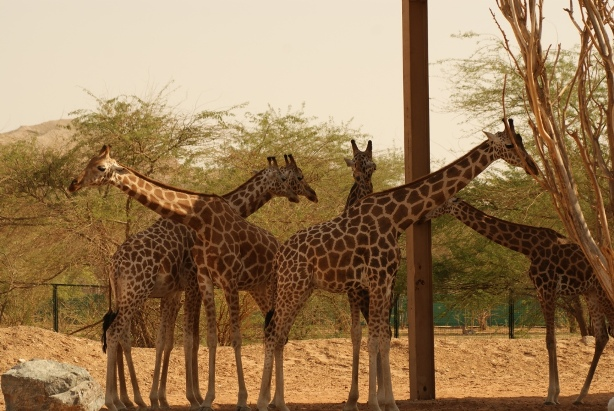
Nubian giraffes

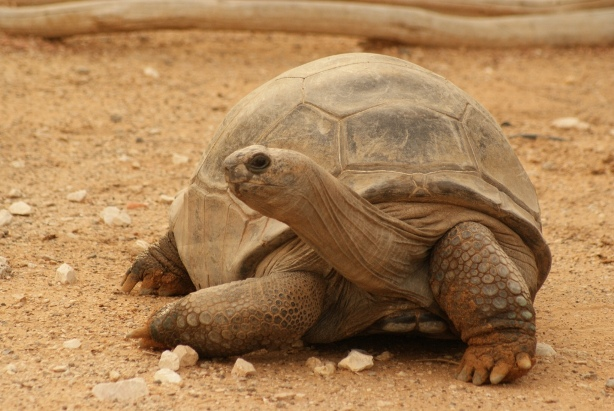
Aldabra giant tortoise

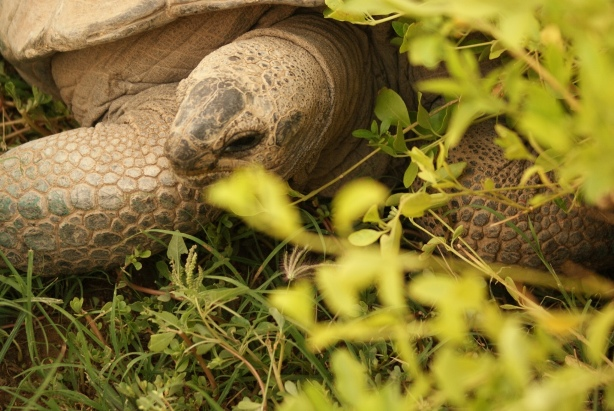
Closeup of Aldabra giant tortoise

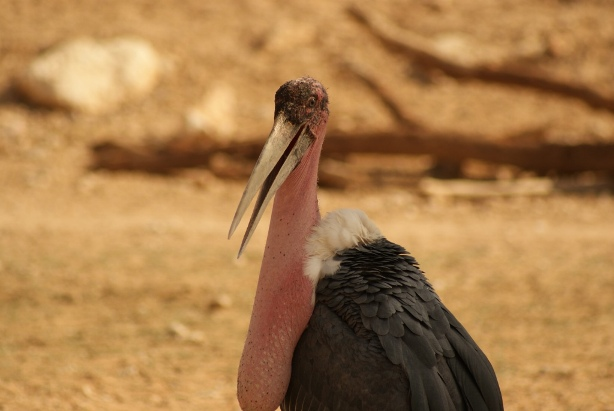
Marabou stork

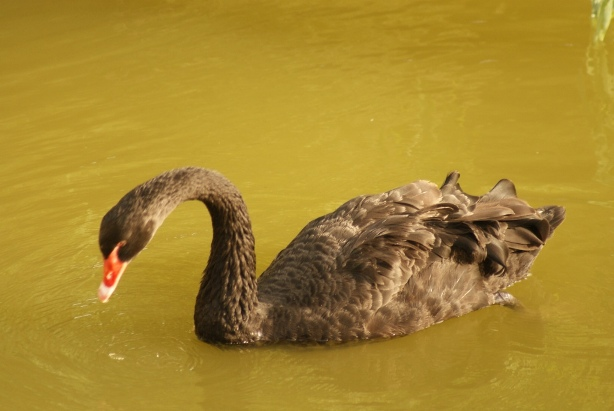
Black swan

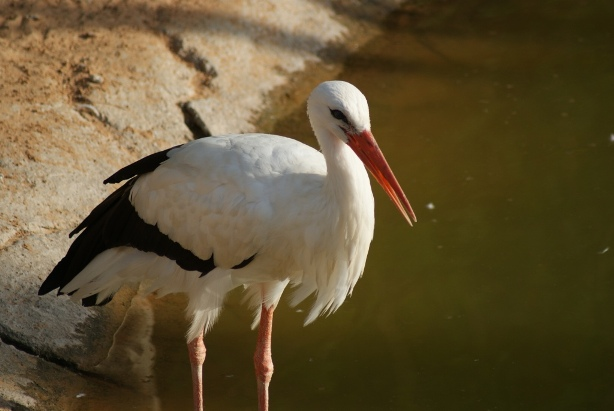
White stork

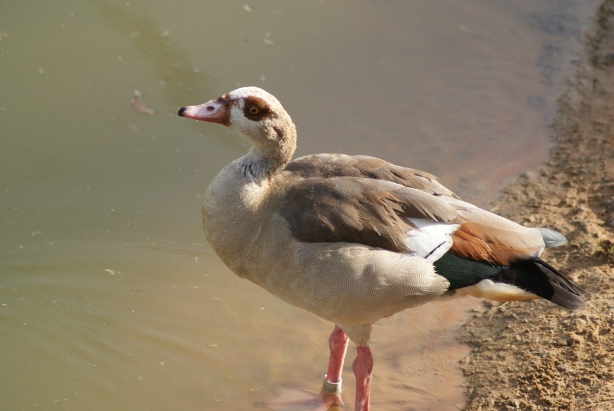
Egyptian goose

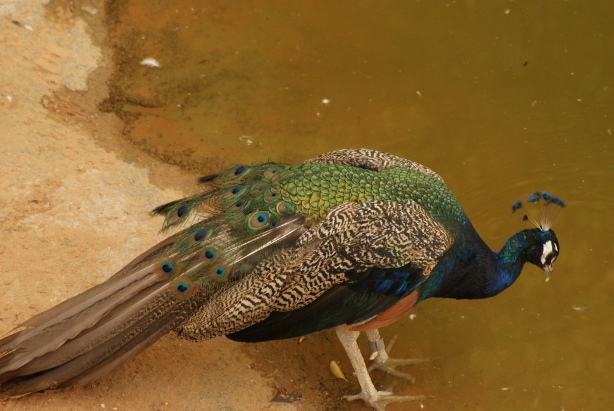
Indian peafowl

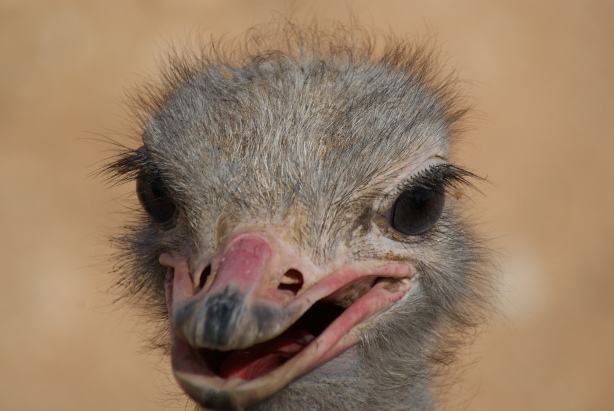
Ostrich

== See also ==
- Al Hefaiyah Conservation Centre
- Dubai Dolphinarium
- Dubai Safari Park
- Dubai Zoo
- Emirates Park Zoo near Abu Dhabi City
- Sir Bani Yas in the Western Region
