= Dubai Safari Park =

Park in Dubai, United Arab Emirates

Coordinates: 25°10′39″N 55°26′57.84″E

- Previously known as Dubai Zoo
- Interactive map of Dubai Safari Park
- Location: Dubai, United Arab Emirates
- Status: Operating
- Opened: 12 December 2017
- Operated by: Dubai Municipality
- Theme: Safari
- Area: 12.8 million Square feet
- Website: www.dubaisafari.ae

Dubai Safari Park (Arabic: دُبَي سَفَارِي بارك, romanized: Dubai Safari Park) is an eco-friendly safari park located in Dubai, United Arab Emirates. The park's major source of energy is solar energy. The park is located on Al Warqa 5 on the Hatta Road.

The park has around 3000 animals from 78 species of mammals – including 10 different carnivores and 17 primates, 50 types of reptiles, 111 kinds of birds, and amphibians and invertebrates.

The park replaced the Dubai Zoo on its 50th anniversary. On 15 May 2018, the park closed for renovations and improvements until being reopened in October 2020. The world-class wildlife park provides a safe environment representing more than 250 species native to the Middle East, Asia and Africa. An entertaining experience for visitors of all ages and nationalities, the park aims to raise awareness about wildlife welfare and conservation through best practices and research.

== History ==
The old Dubai zoo was replaced by Dubai Safari Park when It only had a collection of 1000 animals. The park consists of 12.8 million square feet of area. The old park had faced criticism internationally about the conditions the animals were kept in: caged up, very little space, barely able to move. It was obvious that there had to be a much larger, more open, more modern habitat for the animals.

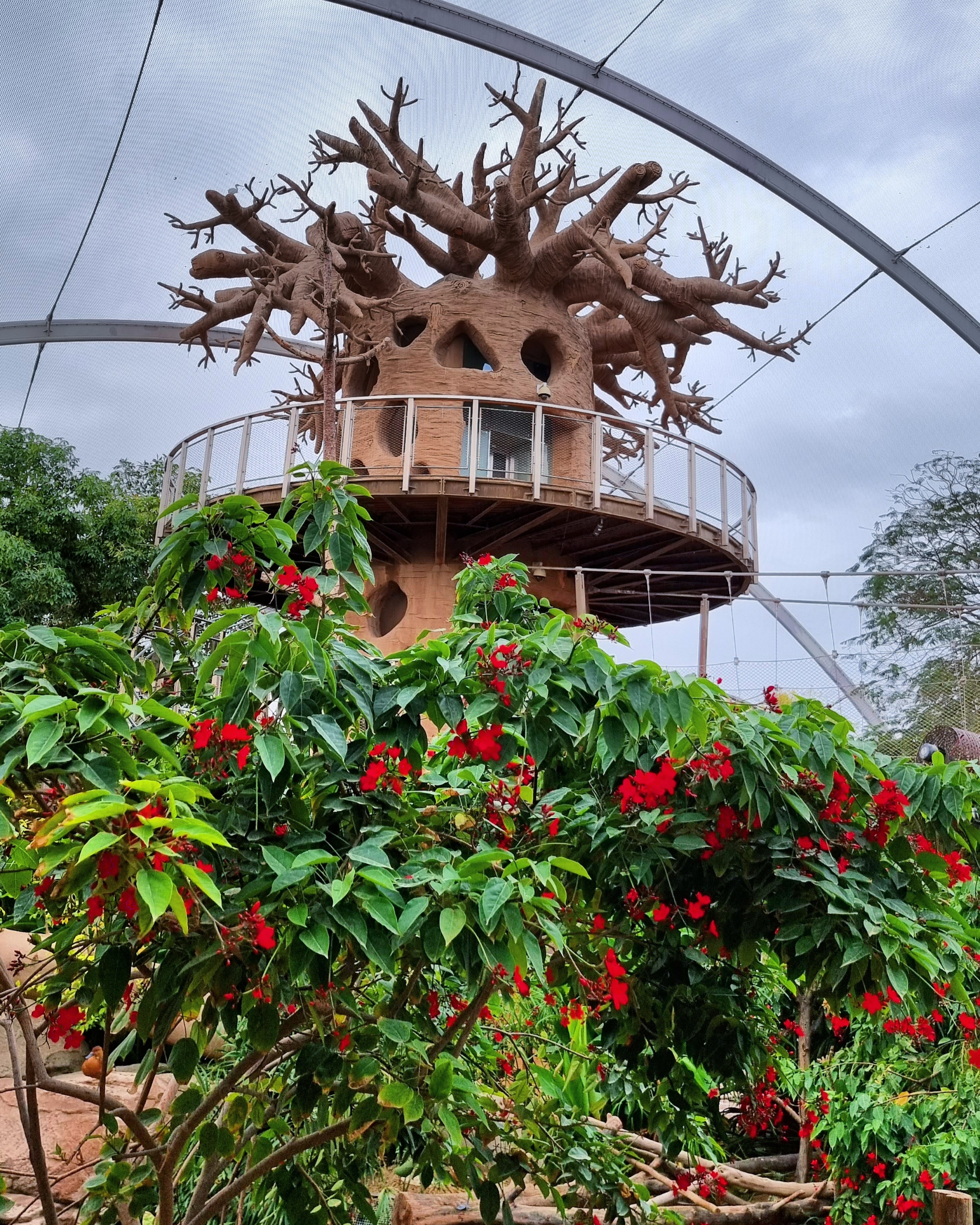
Dubai Safari Park - 2022

Keeping in mind the tourism increase in Dubai, Dubai Municipality took the decision of increasing and moderating the Dubai zoo. $40.8 million were allocated to the project. The project was given to Meraas, the main shareholder of Dubai Parks and Resorts operator. Parques Reunidos was hired as operation manager. The park was opened on 12 December 2017, but closed for renovations and improvements in May 2018. The park was closed again during summer of 2024 and opened in September 2024. During that time over 300 births took place within the park and several other attractions were added.

== Villages ==
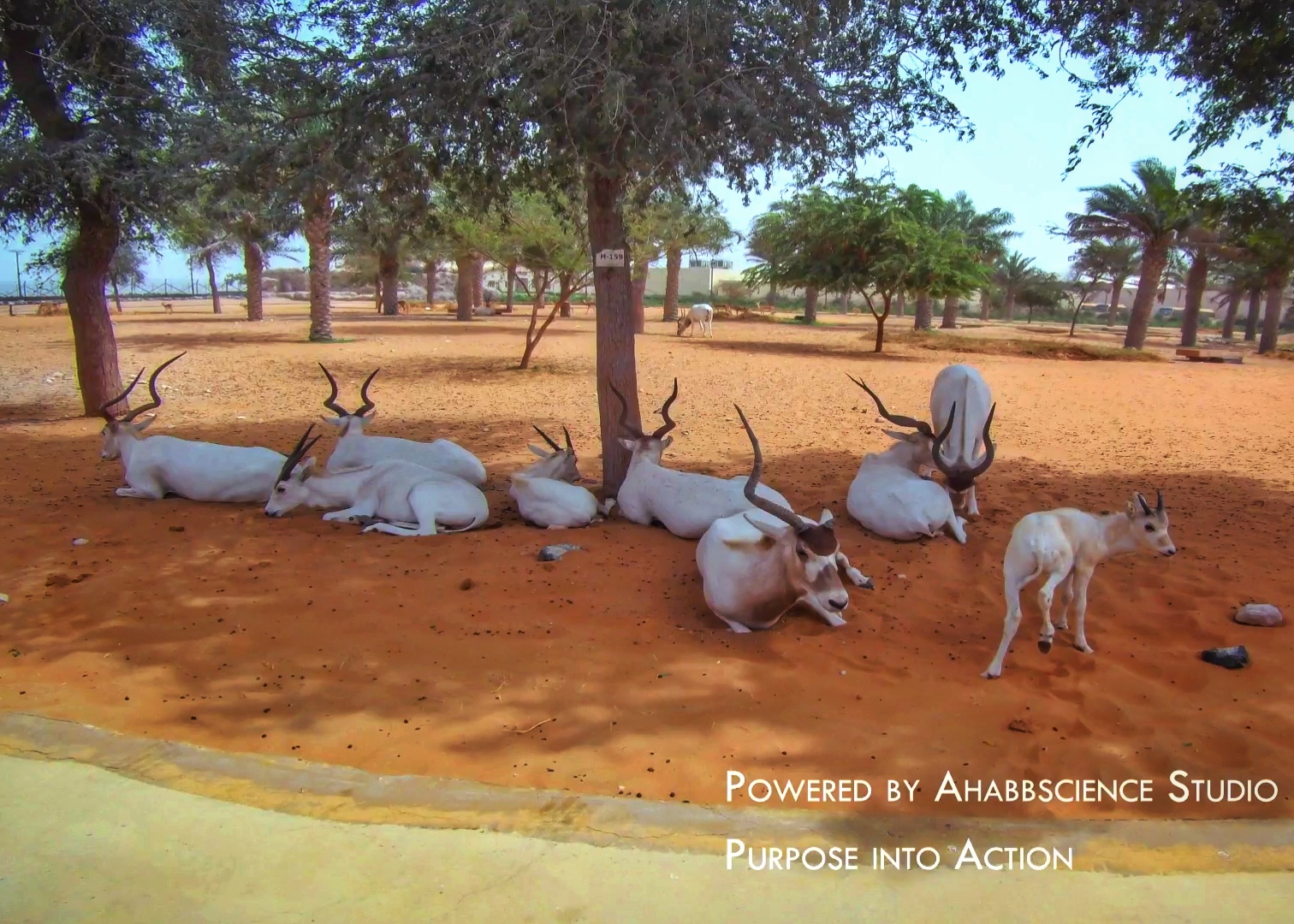
Addaxes at Dubai Safari Park

Dubai Desert Safari Park has five key areas: African Village, Explorer village, Asian Village, Arabian Desert Safari, and Al Wadi. Visitors can also explore the free-roaming areas, such as the Safari Journey and Kids Farm.

The park also has two themed souvenir shops Zwadi and Soko, which are located in African Village and the main building respectively. Each shop has a range of items, such as toys, plush animals, apparel, gifts and souvenirs to commemorate the visit to the park.

=== African Village ===
Giraffes at the feeding platform in the African Village

Home to a range of animal species from the continent of Africa, housing some of the world's largest and smallest land mammals, from the African elephant to the Meerkat.

=== Explorer Village ===
Explorer village is an open area where visitors can go by bus and have a close encounter with animals from Africa and Asia, including giraffes, lions and tigers.

=== Asian Village ===
The village is influenced by the ornate architecture of Asia and is home to animals from Asia, including the Komodo dragon and Indian elephant.

=== Arabian Desert Safari ===
Arabian Desert Safari is a drive-through attraction spanning over 60,000 square meters, and is inspired by the vast deserts of Western Asia, including its mountains, flowers and plants. The main highlight of the Arabian Desert Safari in Dubai Safari Park is the Petting Zoo or Children's Farm. It has animal species from the Arabian Peninsula, like the Arabian oryx and Arabian wolf.

=== Al Wadi ===
Al Wadi "The Valley" area is created for relaxation after the long safari visit. The ground is lush green with ponds of fishes where you can watch fishes and waterfalls.

=== Kids Farm ===
The Kids Farm is a newly created section, which has some of the park's friendliest animals, including sheep, donkeys, ponies, goats, ducks, birds, amongst others. The area is designed with a view kept in mind of learning for children.

== See also ==
- General
  - Great Green Wall
  - Gurgram Safari Park, largest safari park in the world
  - Vantara, safari park in Gujarat in India
- Tourism in the United Arab Emirates
  - Tourism in Abu Dhabi
    - Al Ain Zoo
    - Emirates Park Zoo
  - Tourism in Dubai
    - Dubai Dolphinarium
    - Dubai Zoo
    - Tourist attractions in Dubai
  - Tourism in Sharjah
    - Al Hefaiyah Conservation Centre
    - Breeding Centre for Endangered Wildlife, Sharjah

== External references ==
- Official website of Dubai Safari Park
