= Dubai Dolphinarium =

- دبي دولفيناريوم (Arabic)
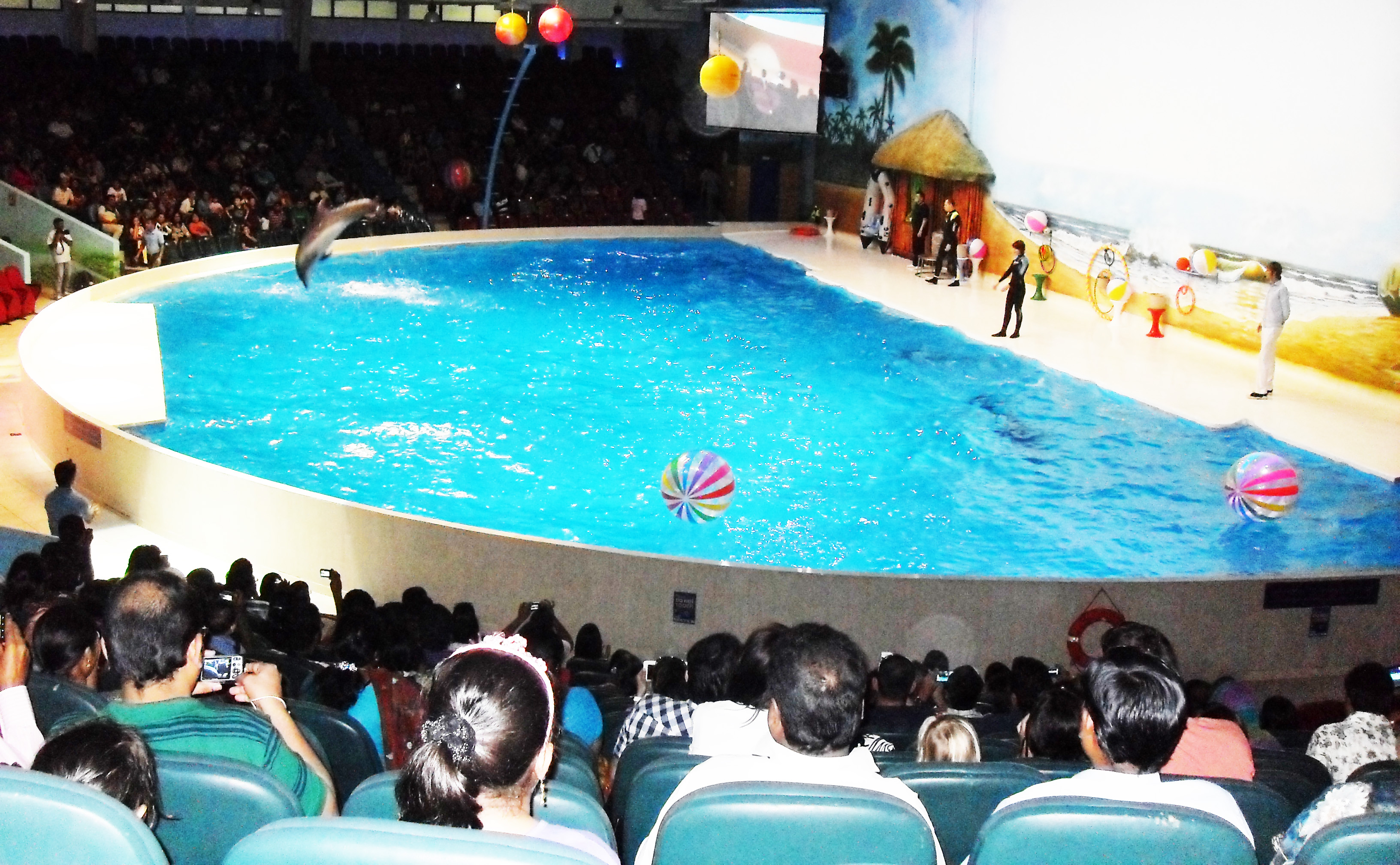
- 2012 show
- Interactive map of Dubai Dolphinarium
- 25.2346°N 55.3267°E
- Date opened: May 21, 2008
- Location: Dubai, United Arab Emirates
- Floor space: 5,000 m^{2} (54,000 ft^{2})
- Website: www.dubaidolphinarium.ae

Dubai Dolphinarium (Arabic: دبي دولفيناريوم) is an indoor dolphinarium in the Middle East, providing habitat to dolphins and seals, allowing the public to watch and interact with them through live shows and photo sessions. It is located at Creek Park near the Children's City within the vicinity of Oud Metha and Bur Dubai. Dubai Dolphinarium was opened on May 21, 2008 in partnership with Dubai Municipality, and is sponsored and supported by Dubai government to provide the general public with entertainment and also educate them regarding dolphins, seals and other marine organisms. It was also reflected that interacting with such friendly mammals like dolphins will motivate young generation to protect marine life and the environment.

== Facilities ==
Dubai Dolphinarium is a 5,000-square-meter (54,000 ft^{2}) modern indoor facility with around 1250 seating capacity for Dolphin & Seal Show. The Dolphins have their own private habitat area with 600 cubic metres (160,000 US gal) of sea water connected to the main arena pool. There is a separate medical pool and seal pool constructed considering well-being of these marine mammals.

The dolphinarium complex also features group and kids activities, birthday parties for kids, school field trips, group events, swim with dolphins, mirror maze, a restaurant providing meals for kids and a mini 5-D cinema theater.

== Marine mammals ==
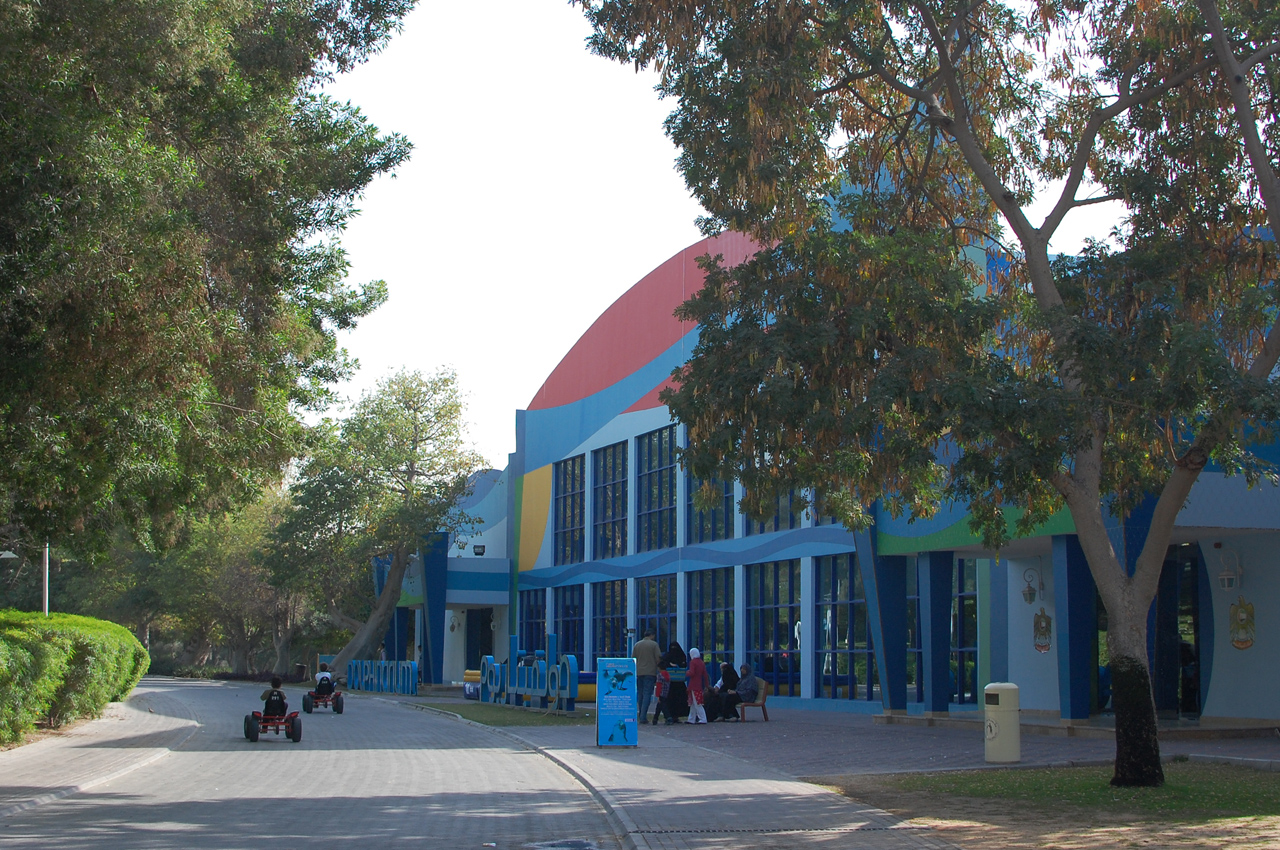
Dubai Children's City, Dolphinarium

Dubai Dolphinarium is home to bottlenose dolphins and Northern fur seals. These dolphins and seals were reportedly bought from a country belonging to the Commonwealth of Independent States, an alliance of 11 former Soviet republics.

== Activities ==
Various activities like kids summer camp and Dubai Summer Surprises are held at the Dubai Dolphinarium every year during summer holidays.

Dubai Dolphinarium in association with Dubai Municipality organized an Autism Awareness Day from various autism care centres and training centres for children with special needs on April 28, 2011.

Dubai Dolphinarium welcomed its one millionth visitor during March, 2012 and various promotional activities were featured during this period.

== Management ==
This establishment is managed by a staff of 60 including mammal trainers and customer supporting staff.

== Criticisms ==
Dubai Dolphinarium had come under criticism from various animal welfare campaigners in the beginning saying, it would lead to suffering and high dolphin mortality. Activists also questioned the source of its black sea bottlenose dolphins, claiming that one of them was not born in captivity but rescued from fishermen's nets, and therefore should have been re-released.

However the management has countered these criticisms stating that the dolphins in Dubai Dolphinarium are third generation dolphins who were born in artificial conditions and are perfectly happy in their current environment and role, and are healthier all year round than their wild counterparts.

In 2019, Dubai Dolphinarium came under heavy waves of criticism after a trainer posted on Instagram a video of them sitting on one of the dolphins, which caused Instagram to issue a warning to whoever had searched “#dubaidolphinarium” on the app.

== See also ==
- Al Ain Zoo
- Al Hefaiyah Conservation Centre
- Emirates Park Zoo
- Breeding Centre for Endangered Wildlife, Sharjah
- Dubai Safari Park
- Dubai Zoo
- Tourism in Dubai
  - Tourist attractions in Dubai
