= Al Hefaiyah Conservation Centre =

Al Hefaiyah Mountain Conservation Centre
- مَرْكَز ٱلْحفيَّة لِصوْن ٱلْحَيَاة ٱلْجَبَلِيَّة (Arabic)
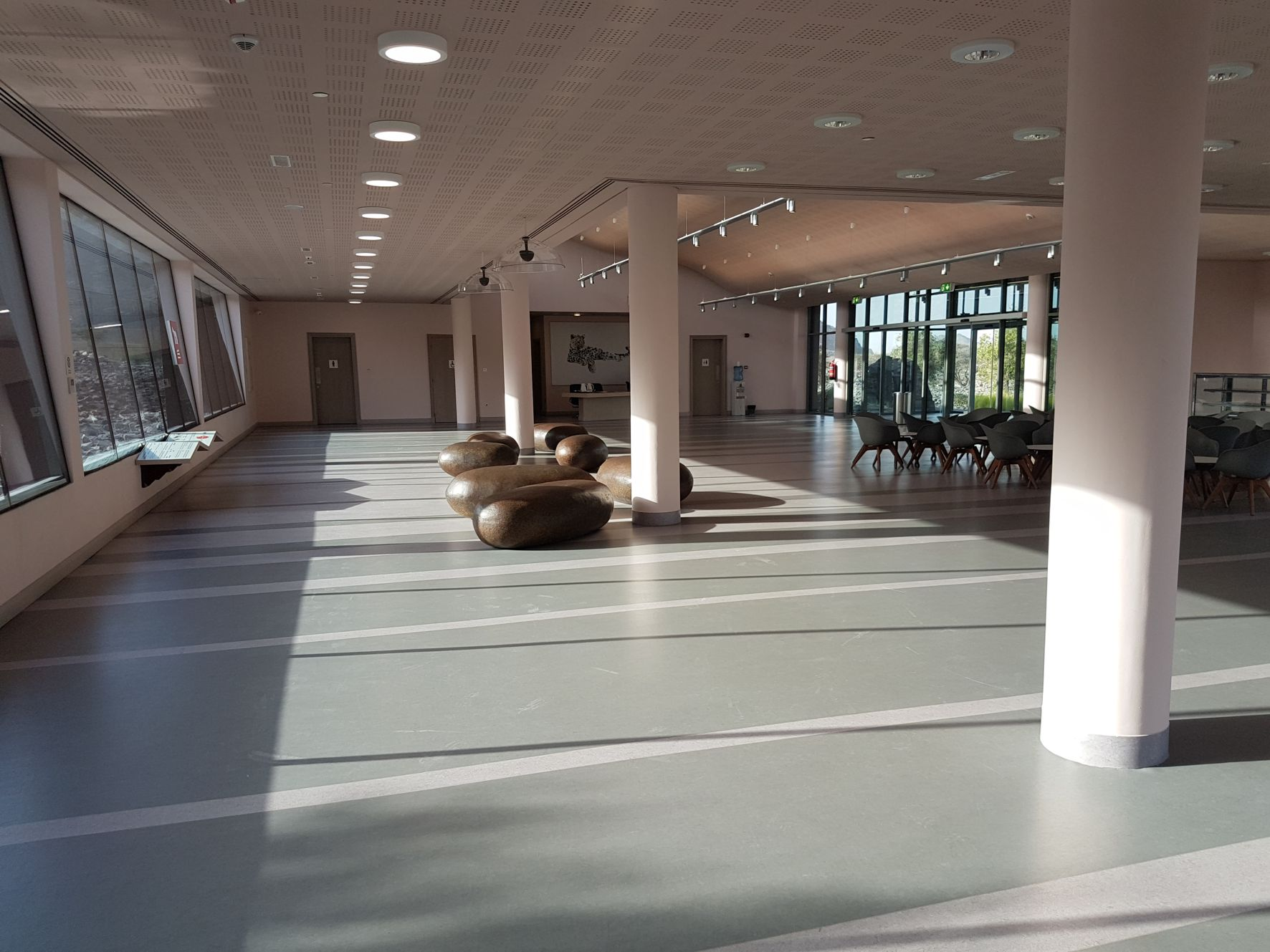
- Interior of the conservation centre
- Interactive map of Al Hefaiyah Mountain Conservation Centre
- 24°59′34.8″N 56°19′29.64″E
- Date opened: 2016
- Location: Kalba, Emirate of Sharjah
- Land area: 12 km^{2} (4.6 sq mi)

Al Hefaiyah Mountain Conservation Centre (Arabic: مَرْكَز ٱلْحفيَّة لِصوْن ٱلْحَيَاة ٱلْجَبَلِيَّة) is a wildlife reserve and visitor centre located west of the coastal town of Kalba in the Emirate of Sharjah, United Arab Emirates

== Facilities ==
Opened in 2016, the Conservation Centre is a 12 km^{2} (4.6 sq mi) wildlife sanctuary and visitor centre, with some 30 animals preserved at the centre, including Arabian leopards, which are thought to now be extinct in the wild in the United Arab Emirates. It has been hailed as a major step forward in the conservation of endangered mountain species in the UAE, and in 2016, it won the Middle East Architect educational project of the year award. In March 2024, Sheikh Dr. Sultan bin Muhammad Al Qasimi, the Ruler of Sharjah, unveiled the Al Hefaiyah Lake project.

== Fauna ==
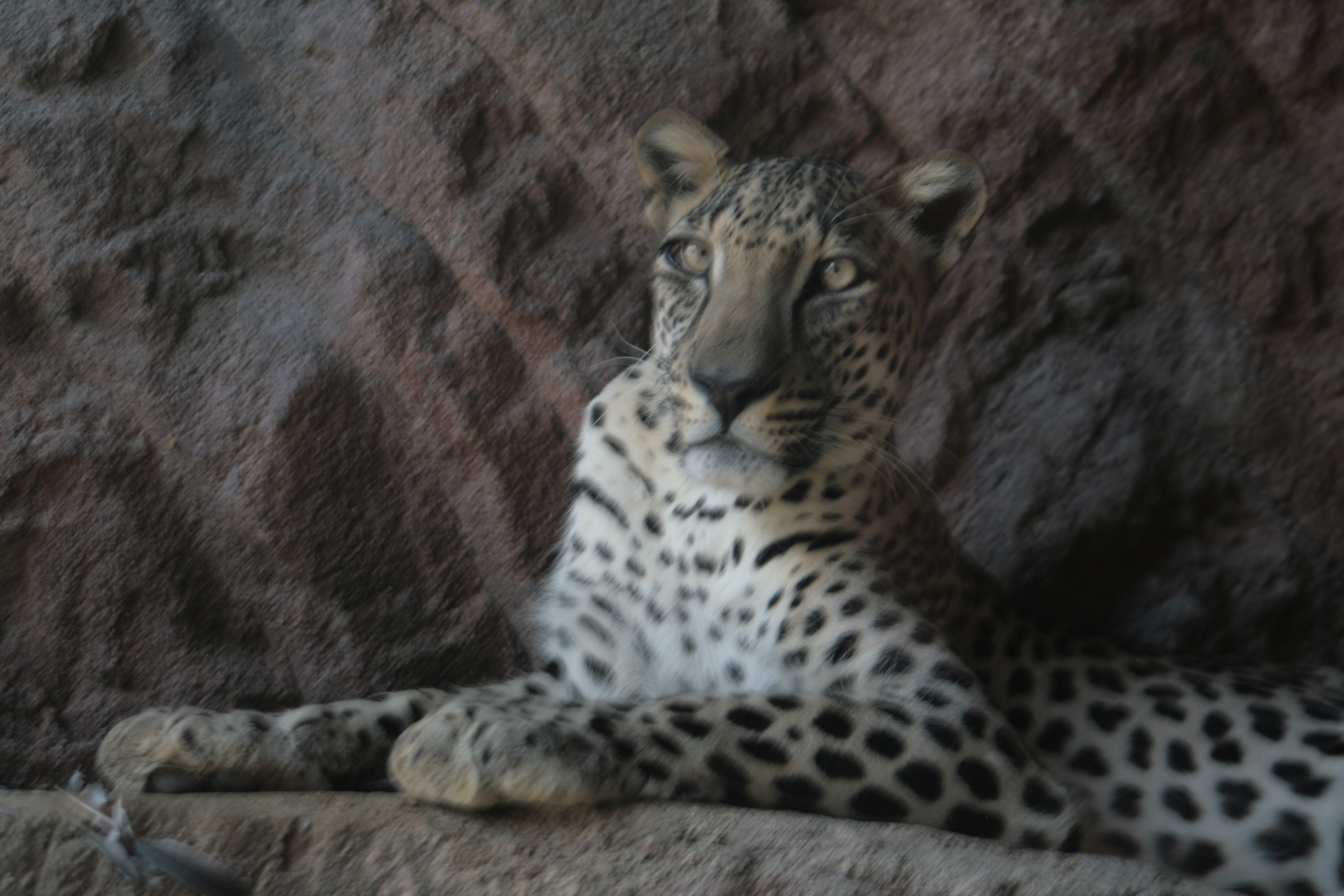
Arabian leopard

Developed by the Sharjah Investment and Development Authority (Shurooq), the Centre is operated by the Sharjah Environment and Protected Areas Authority. The centre comprises a number of landscape enclosures in which mountain fauna are housed in their natural environment. Many of the species housed at the centre were previously at Sharjah's Breeding Centre for Endangered Arabian Wildlife (BCEAW) and are indigenous to the regions of Wadi Al Helo, Khor Fakkan, and Kalba in Al-Hajar Mountains.

Outdoor animals include Arabian leopard, rock hyrax, Arabian and goitered gazelles, caracal, Arabian oryx, tahr, Arabian wolf, and striped hyena. In addition to the critically endangered leopard, the Arabian wolf (Canis lupus arabs) and Arabian tahr (Arabitragus jayakari) are designated threatened species by the International Union for Conservation of Nature (IUCN).

Smaller species are housed indoors at the centre, and include snakes, lizards (such as uromastyx) and nocturnal hedgehogs.

Visitors to the centre travel around the outdoor areas in golf buggies, with guides, and observe a number of animals in their natural habitat. The centre also plays host to art exhibitions, education programs, fundraisers and other events.

== Artworks ==
The centre houses several permanent artworks commissioned by the EPPA (Environment and Protected Areas Authority), including six sound installations by Bradley-Weaver, local designer Khalid Mezaina and artist Joris De Raedt.

== See also ==
- Al Ain Zoo
- Dubai Dolphinarium
- Dubai Safari Park
- Dubai Zoo
- Gulf of Oman
