= Blue wall =

Blue wall may refer to:

- Blue wall (United States), states leaning toward the Democratic Party in presidential elections
- Blue wall (British politics), a group of Conservative-leaning UK parliamentary constituencies which are seen as shifting away from the party
- Blue wall of silence, an informal code among some police officers not to report wrongdoing by fellow officers
  - "The Blue Wall", an episode of the television series Law & Order (season 1)
  - The Blue Wall, a 2018 documentary film about the Chicago murder of Laquan McDonald, updated in 2019 as 16 Shots

== See also ==
- Great Green Wall (disambiguation)
- Green corridor
- Red corridor
- Blue (disambiguation)
- Wall (disambiguation)
