= Emirates Park Zoo & Resort =

Zoo in Abu Dhabi, United Arab Emirates

Emirates Park Zoo & Resort (EPZR)
- حديقة ومنتجع الإمارات للحيوانات (Arabic)
- Main entrance
- Interactive map of Emirates Park Zoo & Resort (EPZR)
- 24°32′45″N 54°40′25″E
- Date opened: 2012
- Location: Al Bahia, Abu Dhabi, United Arab Emirates
- Land area: 39.8 acres (16.1 ha)
- No. of animals: 1125 (2025)
- No. of species: 220 (2025)
- Management: Dr Nasser Lakhreibani Al Nuaimi (chairman), Dr Walid Shaaban (CEO)
- Website: emiratesparkzooandresort.com

Emirates Park Zoo & Resort (Arabic: حديقة ومنتجع الإمارات للحيوانات) is a privately owned zoo with a resort inside it and is located in Al Bahia, Abu Dhabi, United Arab Emirates. Opened in 2012, the facility spans approximately 335 acres (136 hectares) and is landscaped to evoke African themes. The zoo houses more than 1,100 animals representing over 220 species as of 2025, making it one of the largest zoological collections in the emirate.

This zoo is home to over 250 diverse species and 1125 animals.

== History ==
Emirates Park Zoo and Resort was launched in 2008 as the first private zoo in the United Arab Emirates and officially opened to the public in 2012. Since its establishment, the zoo has undergone multiple expansions and redevelopment phases to improve animal welfare, enhance the visitor experience, and strengthen conservation capacity. The zoo provides a variety of interactive experiences, including animal feeding opportunities, VIP encounters such as breakfast with sea lions or giraffes and dinner experiences with big cats or elephants, as well as daily presentations and educational animal talks. These experiences are designed to create meaningful connections with wildlife while encouraging greater understanding and respect for animals and nature.

From its early development, Emirates Park Zoo and Resort has placed strong emphasis on conservation, education, and sustainability. The zoo is accredited by the Association of Zoos and Aquariums (AZA) and is a member of the World Association of Zoos and Aquariums (WAZA), reflecting its commitment to internationally recognised standards in animal care, welfare, conservation, and education. In April 2025, EPZR entered into a conservation partnership with Wildlife Alliance, an international non-profit organisation focused on forest and wildlife protection. The collaboration supports the Phnom Tamao Wildlife Rescue Centre in Cambodia, which rescues, rehabilitates, and releases wildlife affected by illegal trafficking and habitat loss.

== Location and access ==
Emirates Park Zoo and Resort is located in Al Bahyah, Abu Dhabi, United Arab Emirates, about 17 km (roughly 10–15 minutes by car) from Zayed International Airport, approximately 45 minutes from the centre of Abu Dhabi, and around 45 minutes from Dubai by road. Emirates Park Zoo and Resort is 15 minutes away from famous Yas world.

== Conservation and research ==
Emirates Park Zoo and Resort participate in regional and international conservation initiatives, including managed breeding programmes for endangered species. The zoo employs Assisted reproductive technology, such as Artificial insemination and In vitro fertilisation (IVF), and biobanking to preserve genetic material and support species survival planning. All births comply with standards set by the Association of Zoos and Aquariums (AZA) and the World Association of Zoos and Aquariums (WAZA).

== Sustainability initiatives ==
The zoo operates several environmental sustainability programmes. In partnership with cleantech company Sparklo, EPZR has collected more than 340,000 plastic bottles and aluminium cans, reducing carbon emissions by over 51,000 kilograms.

Emirates Park Zoo and Resort is also the first zoo in the UAE to produce recycled paper from elephant dung. One kilogram of dung is converted into approximately 20 sheets of handmade A4 paper using a manual process without machinery.

== Exhibits and facilities ==
The zoo features a combination of animal exhibits, visitor attractions, and hospitality facilities, including:

- Emirates Park Resort, an on-site accommodation facility for overnight guests
- Al Dar Garden, a landscaped visitor garden within the zoo grounds
- Zoo Veterinary Centre, providing medical care and welfare services for the animal collection

== Animal collection ==
As of 2025, Emirates Park Zoo and Resort houses more than 1,100 animals across mammals, birds, and reptiles.

=== Mammals ===
Notable mammal species include African bush elephants, Asiatic lions, White Tigers, Zebras, Jaguars, Striped hyenas, Sloth bears, Four-horned antelopes, Sambar deers, Sika deers, and Lion-tailed macaques.

=== Birds ===
The avian collection includes African grey parrots, Blue-and-yellow macaws, Common ostrichs, Emus, Greater rheas, Painted storks, Great hornbills, Egyptian vultures, and various pheasant and parakeet species.

=== Reptiles and aquatic species ===
Reptile and aquatic exhibits include Gharials, Mugger crocodiles, diadem snakes, Checkered keelbacks, Dhamans, and Lionfish.

== Management ==
Emirates Park Zoo and Resort is chaired by Dr Nasser Lakhreibani Al Nuaimi, with Dr Walid Shaaban serving as Chief Executive Officer.

== Gallery ==
Emirates Park Zoo Entrance

White Tiger

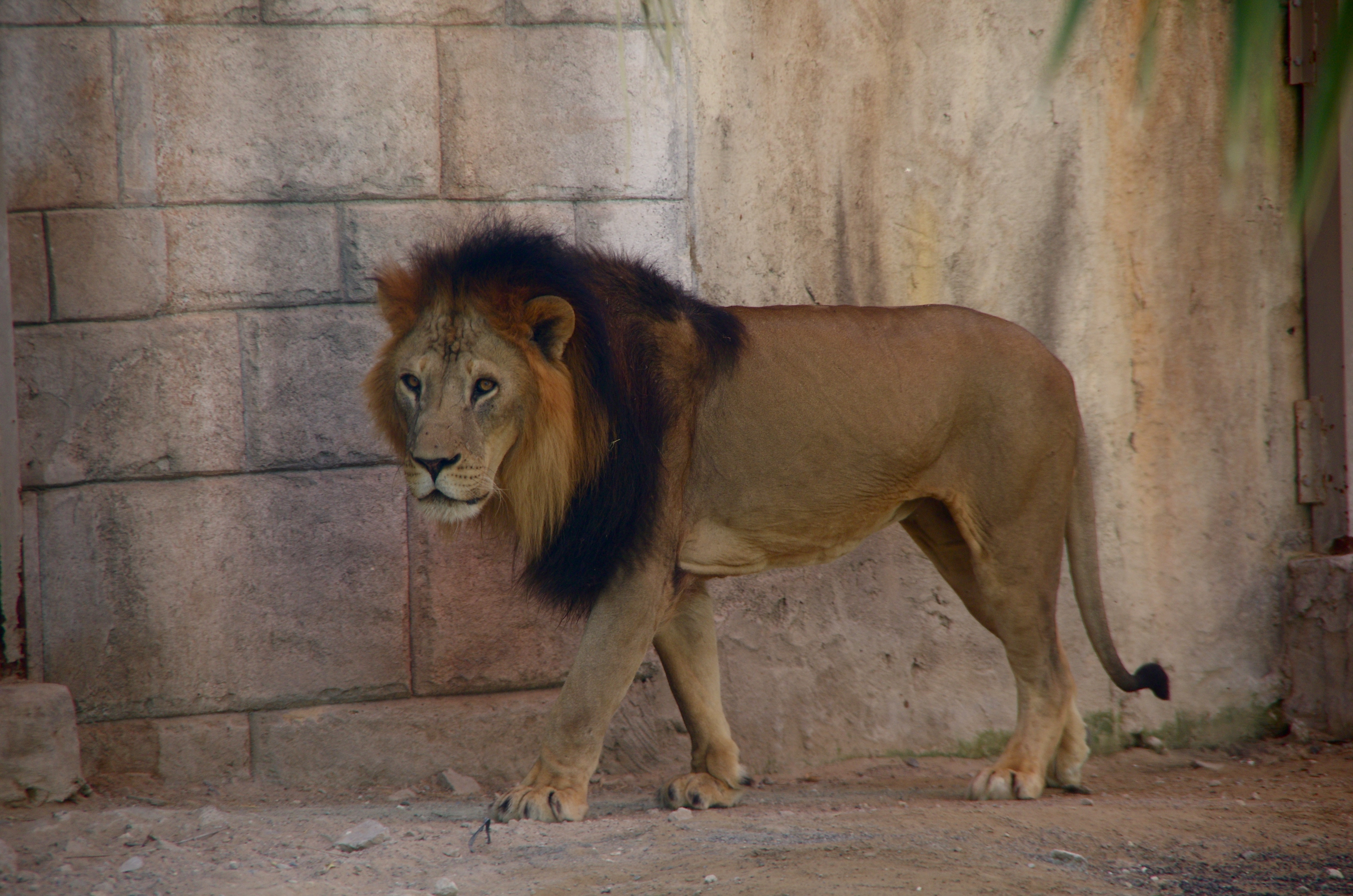
Lion

Leopards

Armadillos

Addax

Elephant

Lionfish

== See also ==
- Dubai Zoo
- Dubai Safari Park
- Tourism in Dubai
  - Tourist attractions in Dubai
