= White tiger (disambiguation) =

A white tiger is a tiger with a genetic condition affecting its pelt's pigmentation.

White tiger, White Tiger or The White Tiger may also refer to:

== Arts, entertainment, and media ==
=== Characters ===
- White Tiger (comics), various Marvel Comics superheroes, including:
  - White Tiger (Hector Ayala), the first to use the name
  - White Tiger (Heroes for Hire), second
  - White Tiger (Kasper Cole), third
  - White Tiger (Angela del Toro), fourth
  - White Tiger (Ava Ayala), fifth
- White Tigers (Beyblade), a team in the anime Beyblade

=== Film and TV ===
- White Tiger (1923 film), a film directed by Tod Browning
- White Tiger (1996 film), a film starring Gary Daniels
- White Tiger (2012 film), a Russian WWII film
- The White Tiger (2021 film), a Netflix film
- Grambling's White Tiger, a US TV movie made in 1981, released as White Tiger in Europe

=== Literature ===
- The White Tiger (Nathan novel), a 1987 novel by Robert Stuart Nathan
- White Tiger, a 2006 novel by Kylie Chan
- The White Tiger (Adiga novel), a 2008 novel by Aravind Adiga
- The White Tyger, the third novel in Paul Park's A Princess of Romania series

=== Music ===
- White Tiger (band), an American glam metal band
- "White Tiger" (song), a 2015 song by Izzy Bizu

== Biology ==
- White tiger (butterfly), the tiger butterfly species Danaus melanippus
- White tiger (moth), the moth species Nyctemera coleta

== Other ==
- White Tiger (mythology), one of the Four Symbols in Chinese astrology and astronomy
- White Tiger oil field, in the South China Sea
- White Tigers (Korean War), guerrilla unit of the United States Army
- White Tigers (gang), a former street gang in New York City
- K808/806 White Tiger, a family of 8x8 and 6x6 armored vehicles

== See also ==
- HC Bílí Tygři Liberec, Czech ice-hockey club also known as Liberec White Tigers Hockey Club
- Tigatron, a fictional character from the Transformers universe, who transforms into a white tiger
- White Tiger Ranger in Power Rangers Wild Force
- Tommy Oliver, the White Ranger from Mighty Morphin Power Rangers, who is based on a white tiger
