= Great Green Wall =

Great Green Wall could mean:

- Great Green Wall (Africa)
- Great Green Wall (China)
- Great Green Wall (India)
- Great Hedge of India

== See also ==
- Blue wall (disambiguation)
- Green corridor
- Green wall
- Red corridor
