= Dubai Zoo =

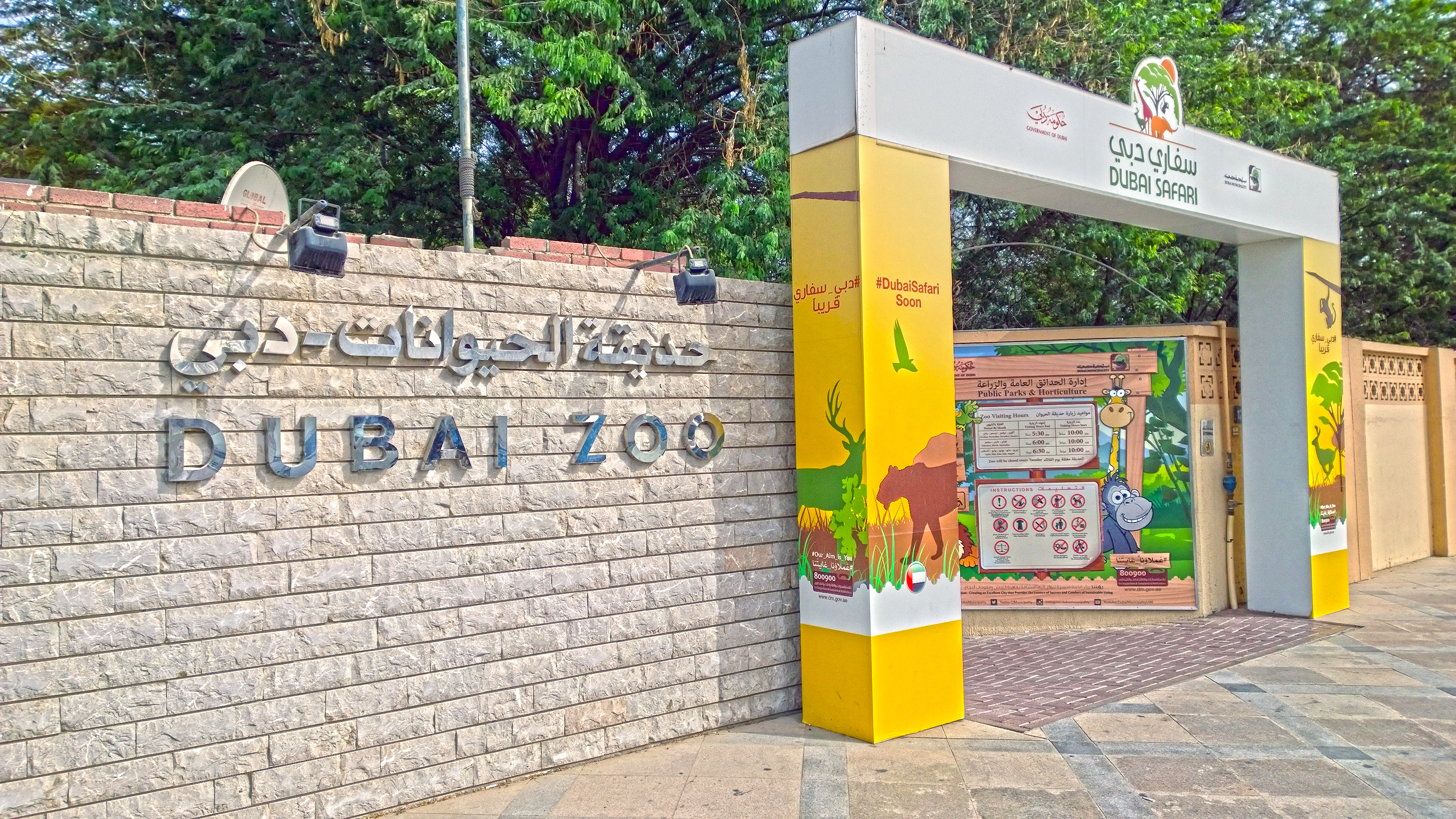
- The entrance to Dubai Zoo in 2015
- Interactive map of Dubai Zoo
- 25°13′21″N 55°15′24″E
- Date opened: 1 May 1967; 59 years ago
- Date closed: 5 November 2017; 8 years ago
- Location: Dubai, United Arab Emirates
- Land area: 1.5 ha (3.7 acres)
- No. of species: 230
- Memberships: WAZA

Dubai Zoo (Arabic: حديقة حيوانات دبي) was a 1.5-kilometre (0.93 mi) zoo located in Dubai, United Arab Emirates. It was the oldest zoo in the Arabian Peninsula. It opened on 1 May 1967 and permanently closed its doors on 5 November 2017 and its animals were located to Dubai Safari Park.

== History ==
Dubai Zoo was originally built in 1967 by a Dubai resident when Sheikh Rashid bin Maktoum, the late Ruler of Dubai, permitted Otto J. Bulart to build a zoo on a 2-hectare (4.9-acre) plot in Jumeirah. It was considered a Dubai landmark in the late 1960s as it indicated the "town's end".

In 1971 the management of the Dubai Zoo was taken over by the Dubai Municipality. During the first couple of years of its existence, the Dubai Zoo housed only a few animals like the big cats, monkeys and hoofed-animals. There was also a small aquarium with some fishes and reptiles. From May 1986 to May 1989, a part of the zoo was redesigned and rebuilt. From June 1989 to the present there has been constant re-designing and renovation. Dubai zoo is the first Arabian zoo to breed the rare chimpanzee and the Arabian or Gordon's wildcat (Felis silvestris gordoni).

Prior to its closure, Dubai Zoo was criticised for the conditions in which its animals were housed. Animal rights activists encouraged the boycotting of the facility. The zoo closed on 5 November 2017 and all its animals were relocated to the new Dubai Safari Park.

== Animals ==
The zoo housed approximately 230 animal species. Among these are around 248 mammal specimens, including foxes, hyenas, pumas, Asiatic lions, jaguars, chimpanzees, baboons, monkeys, deer, bears, porcupines, giraffes, hippos, and Barbary sheep. Endangered species include Socotra shag or cormorant, Bengal tiger, gorilla, subspecies of grey wolf and Arabian wolf, Siberian tiger (Panthera tigris altaica), and the indigenous Gordon's wildcat. Birds include ostrich, golden eagle and parrots. Reptiles are represented by around 400 specimens.

== Dubai Safari Park ==
Dubai Municipality planned to build a new zoo since at least 2003 to replace the old zoo. Construction was to be completed by 2008 and the zoo would be sited variously at Mushrif Park or Dubailand at an estimated cost of US$55.6 million or AED 610 million. In February 2009, it was announced that the zoo project at Dubailand was on indefinite hold.

On 11 February 2012 the municipality announced that it had commissioned a study to shift the two-hectare, government-run zoo from Jumeirah to new, world-class premises. Within two months a consultancy and action team had come up with the final concept, proposing a new location and required area, and recommending the allocation of space for each species according to international standards, said Hussain Lootah, the director general of the municipality.

On 14 May 2012, it was announced by the Dubai Municipality that the animals from the overcrowded Dubai Zoo will be relocated to an open safari within the next two years. Officials said they will redevelop 400 hectares (990 acres) of land in Al Warqa'a for the safari project, at a cost of Dh150 million. The safari houses the existing zoo animals and also accommodates new ones. "The zoo is one of the issues and has been the big talk for many years" said Mr Hussain Lootah, the municipality's director general.

On 23 April 2013, Hussain Nassir Lootah, Director General of Dubai Municipality said that the first phase of the Dubai Safari has completed and the construction of the project will be completed by end of 2014.

The ambitious Dubai Safari park was developed on land that has been previously a landfill. Excavation work started in September 2012. Dubai Safari Park is spread across 120 hectares of land and include a zoo, safari and butterfly park, botanical garden, resort, and golf course, in addition to educational and veterinary facilities. It features more than 1,000 animals and birds.

The safari is divided into African, Asian and Arabian villages, with each village accommodating animals from those respective regions. As of 5 November 2017, the old zoo has been closed down.

The Dubai safari Park was opened on 12 December 2017 to the general public.

== Gallery ==
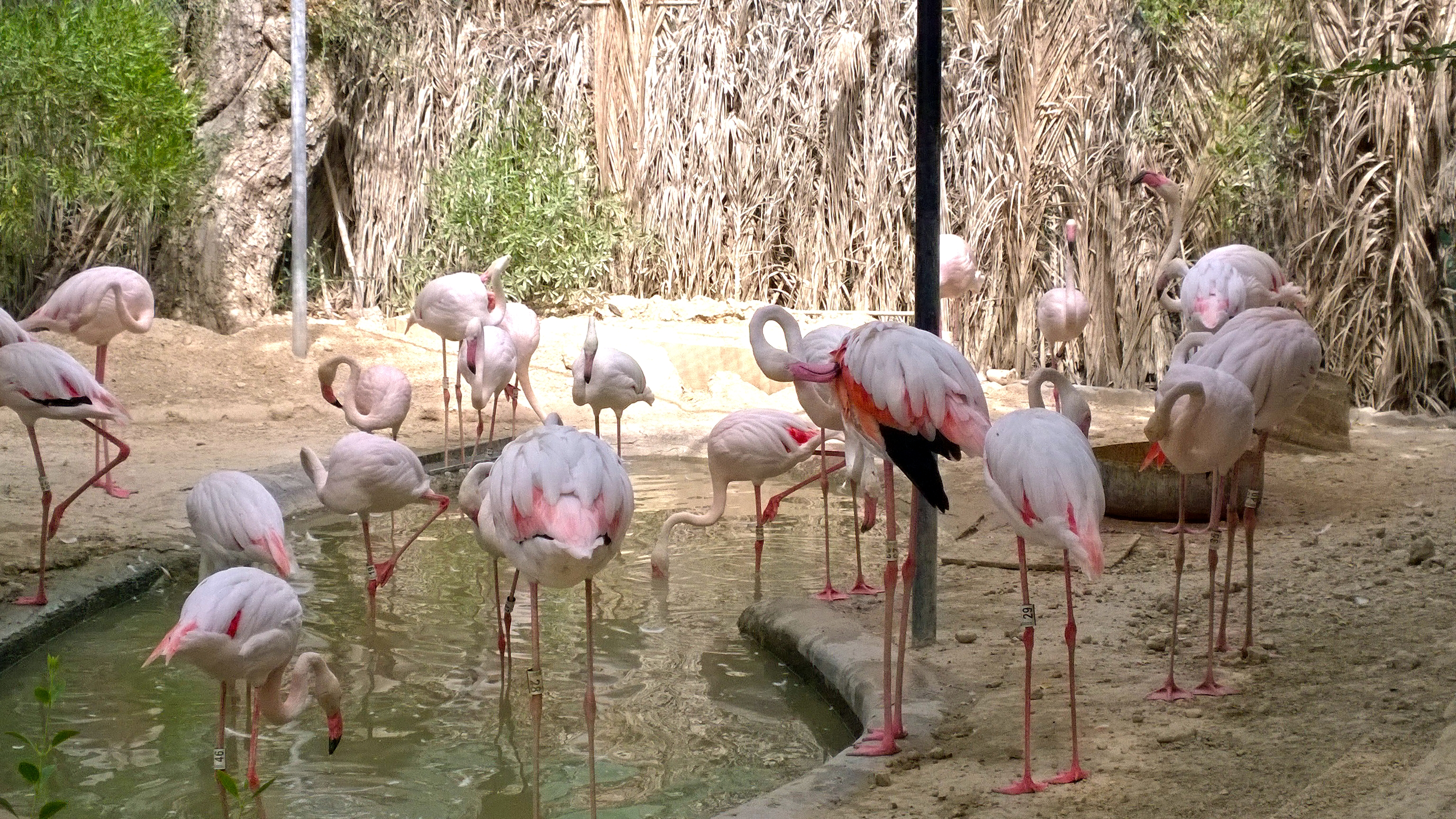
Flamingos

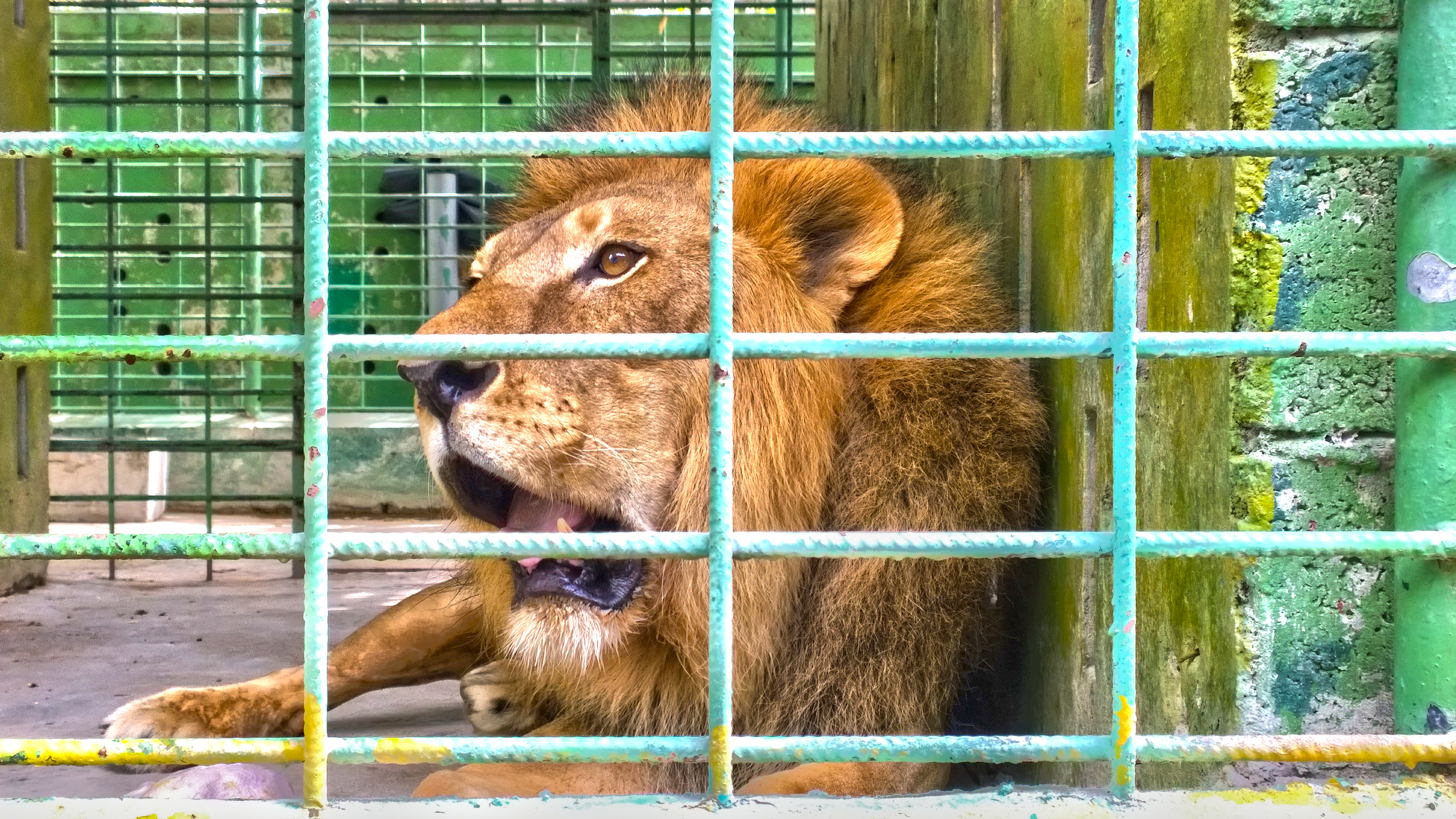
Lion

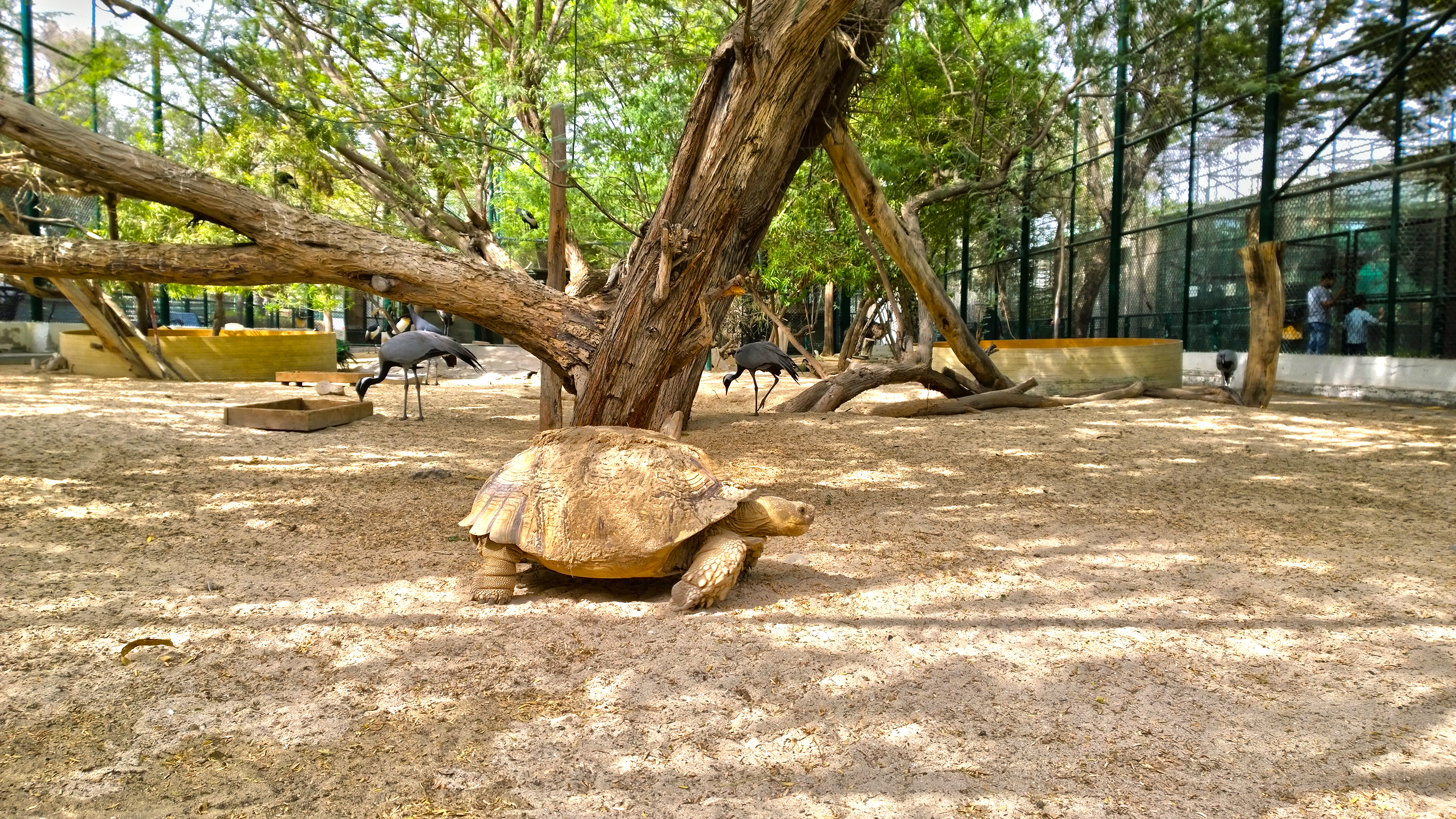
Tortoise

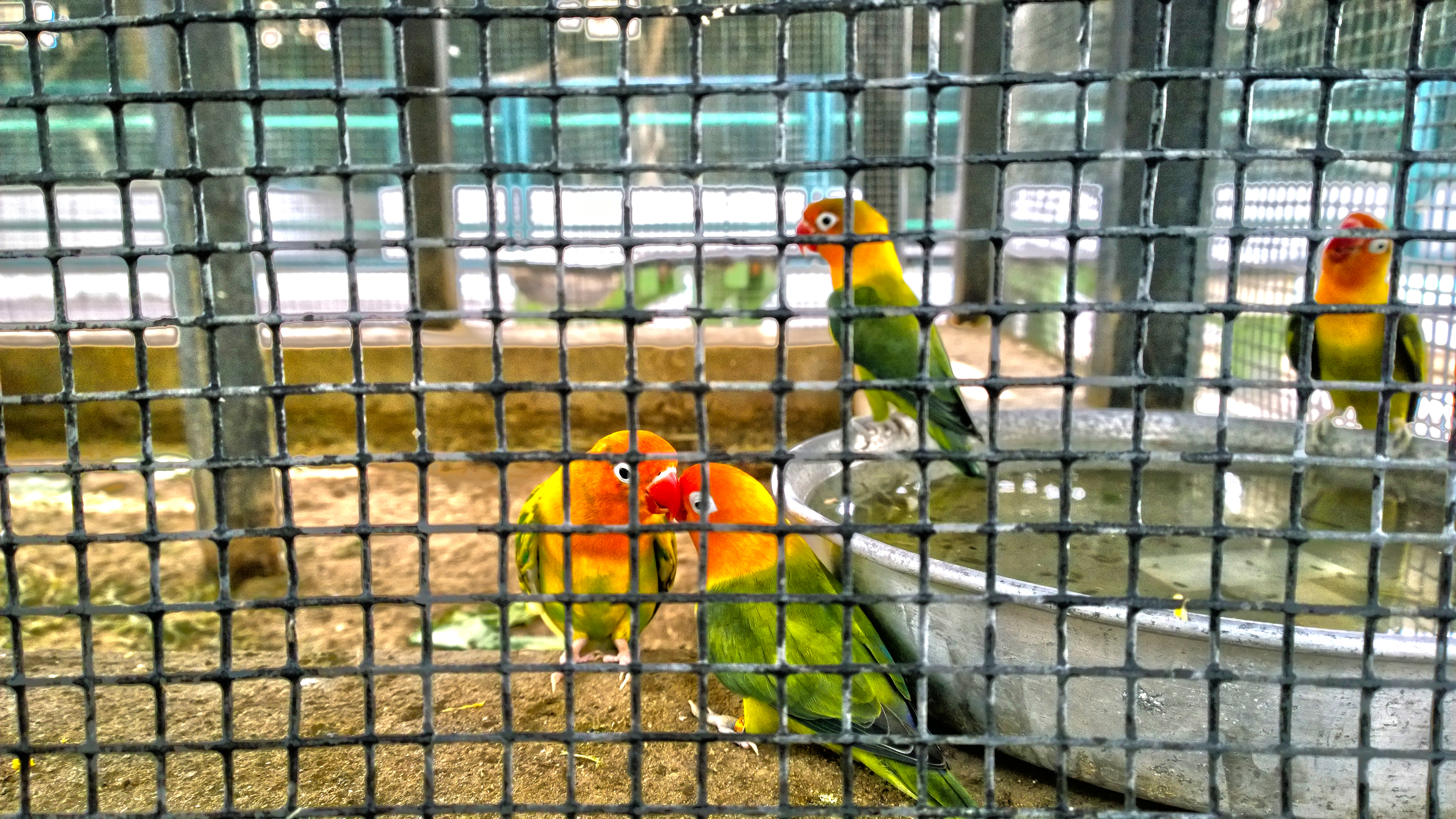
Parrots

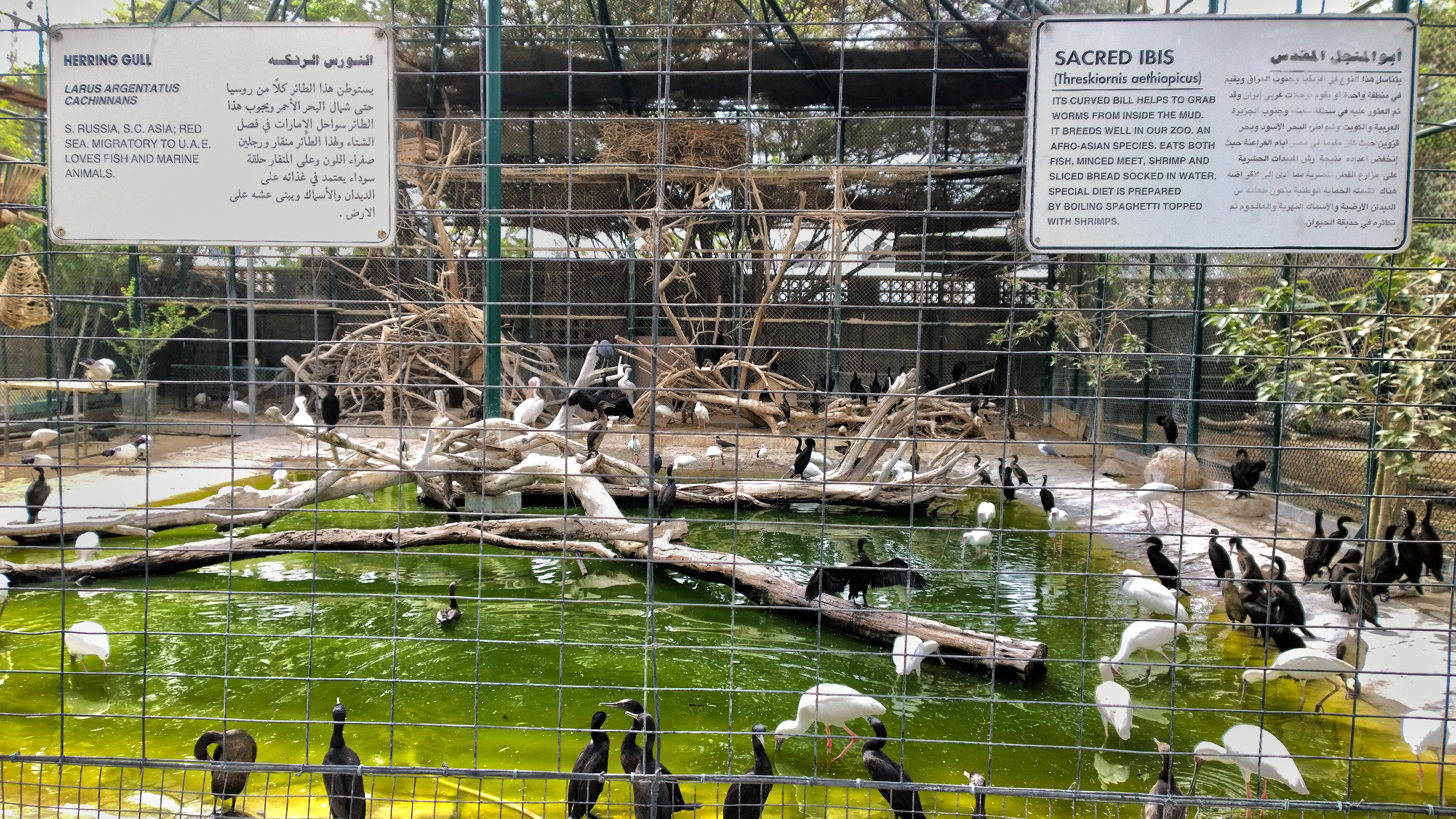
Herring gull and sacred ibis

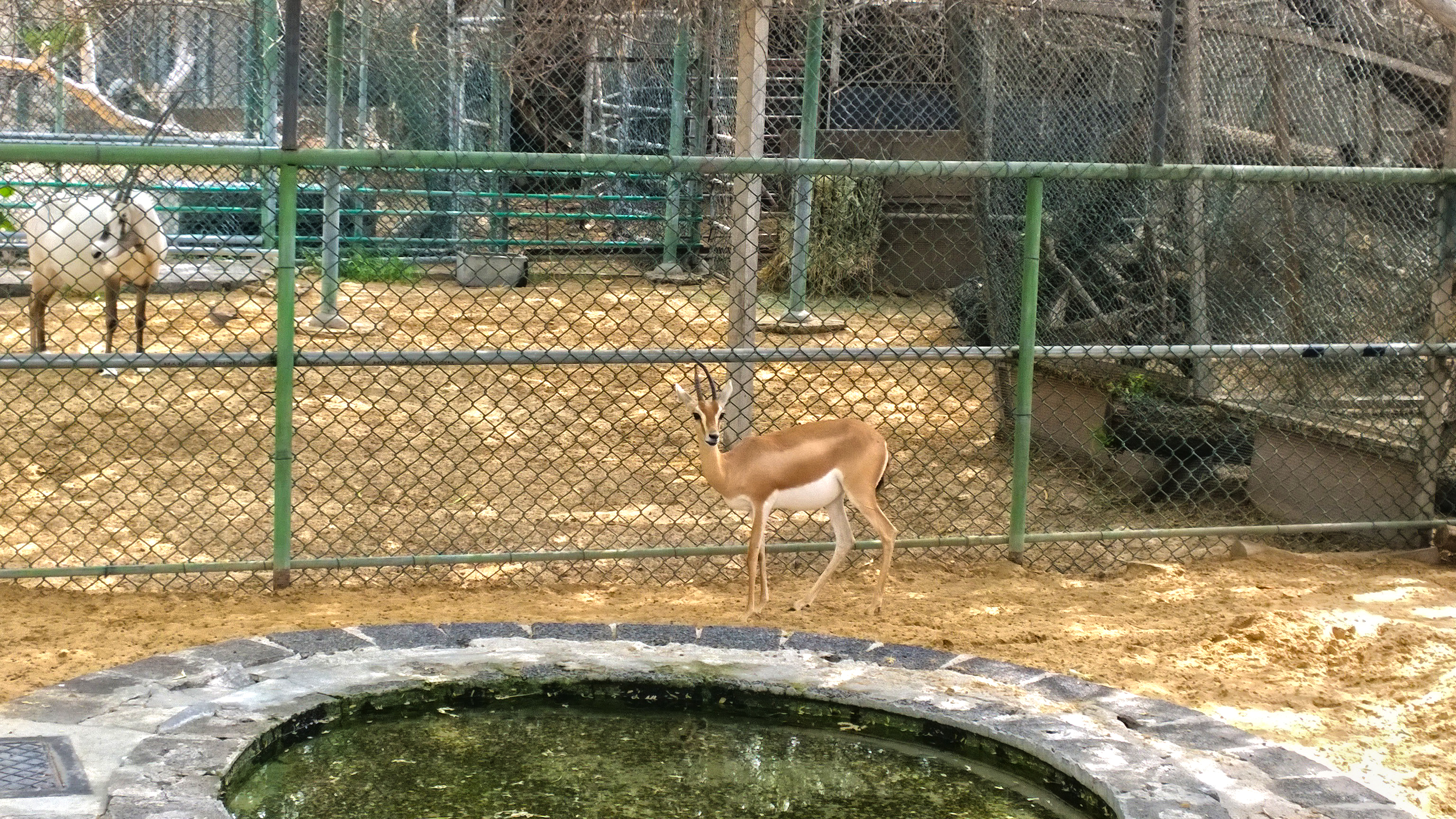
Deer

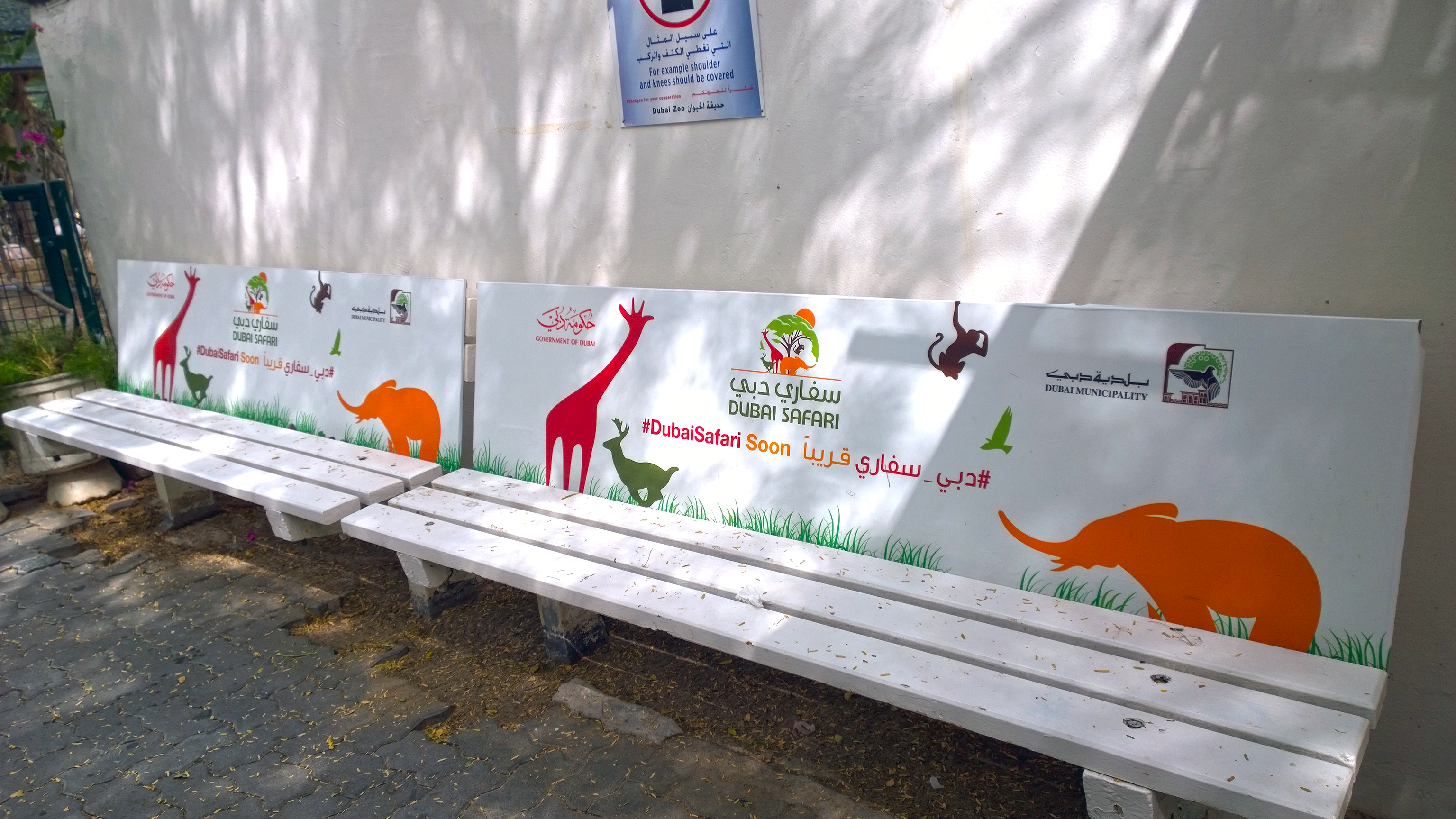
Benches

== See also ==
- Al Ain Zoo
- Al Hefaiyah Conservation Centre
- Breeding Centre for Endangered Wildlife, Sharjah
- Dubai Dolphinarium
- Dubai Safari Park
- Tourism in Dubai
  - Tourist attractions in Dubai
