= History of Emirates (airline) =

Emirates, the world's fourth-largest airline by scheduled revenue passenger-kilometers flown and number of international passengers carried, was founded in 1985 by the royal family of Dubai. The airline's first flight was from Dubai to Karachi, Pakistan in October of that year. Its first aircraft were provided by Pakistan International. The airline grew rapidly through partnerships and investment to become one of the world's leading air carriers. There are plans for Emirates and PIA to codeshare.

== Founding ==
External videos
- A pilot's view from our first flight on 25 October 1985: Emirates Airline

During the mid-1980s, Gulf Air began to cut back its services to Dubai as it was concerned it was providing regional feeder flights for other carriers. As a result, Emirates was conceived in March 1985 with backing from Dubai's royal family, and was required to operate independently of government subsidies, apart from US$10 million.

In the mid-1980s, Pakistan International Airlines (PIA) played a large role in establishing the Emirates airline by providing technical and administrative assistance to the new carrier as well as gifting a new Boeing 737-300 and an Airbus A300B4-200. The Royal Family's Dubai Royal Air Wing also provided the airline with two used Boeing 727-200 Adv. The airline's first flight, flight EK600, was from Dubai, UAE to Karachi, Pakistan on 25 October 1985.

== Early years ==
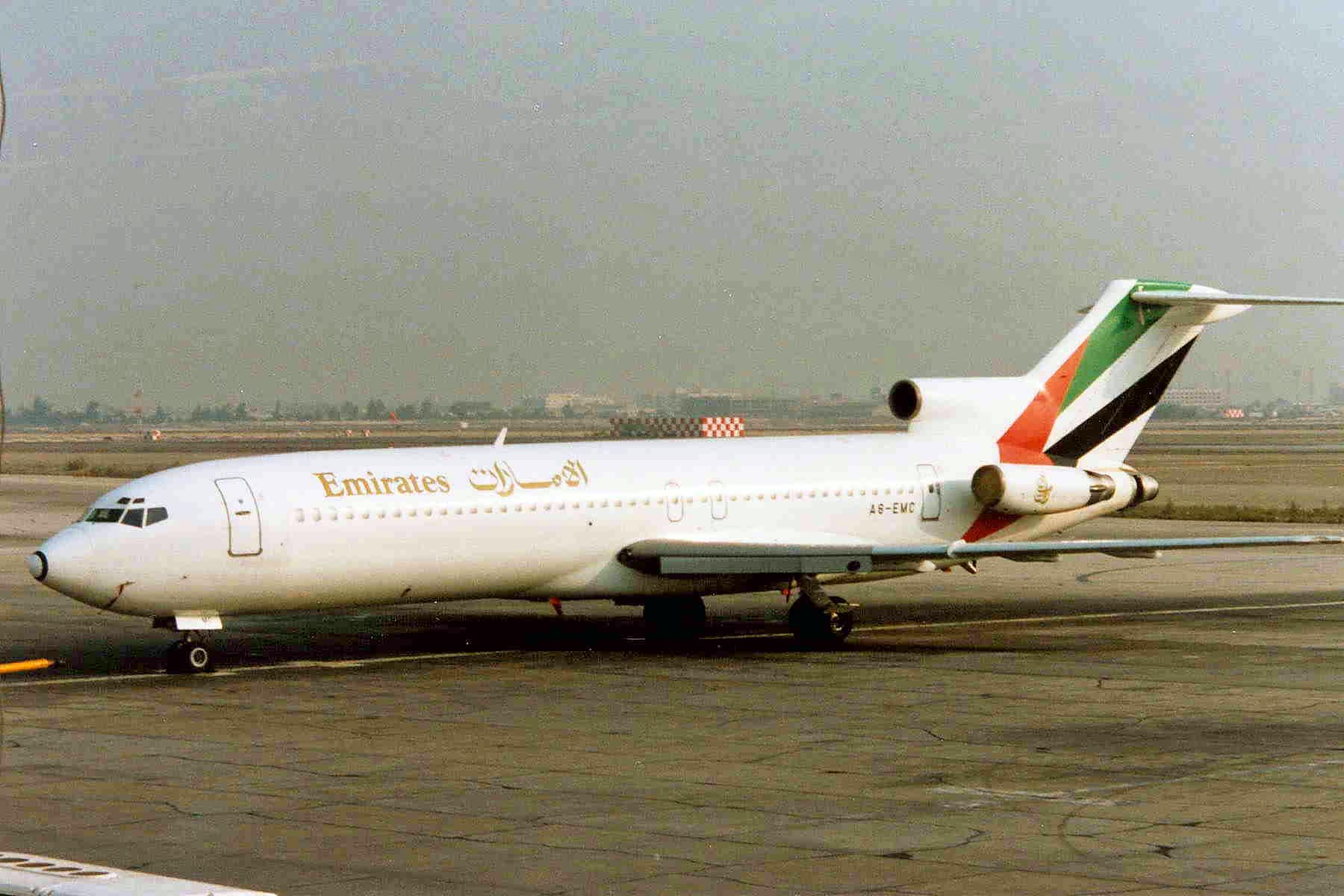
Emirates Boeing 727-200 at Dubai International Airport (1991)

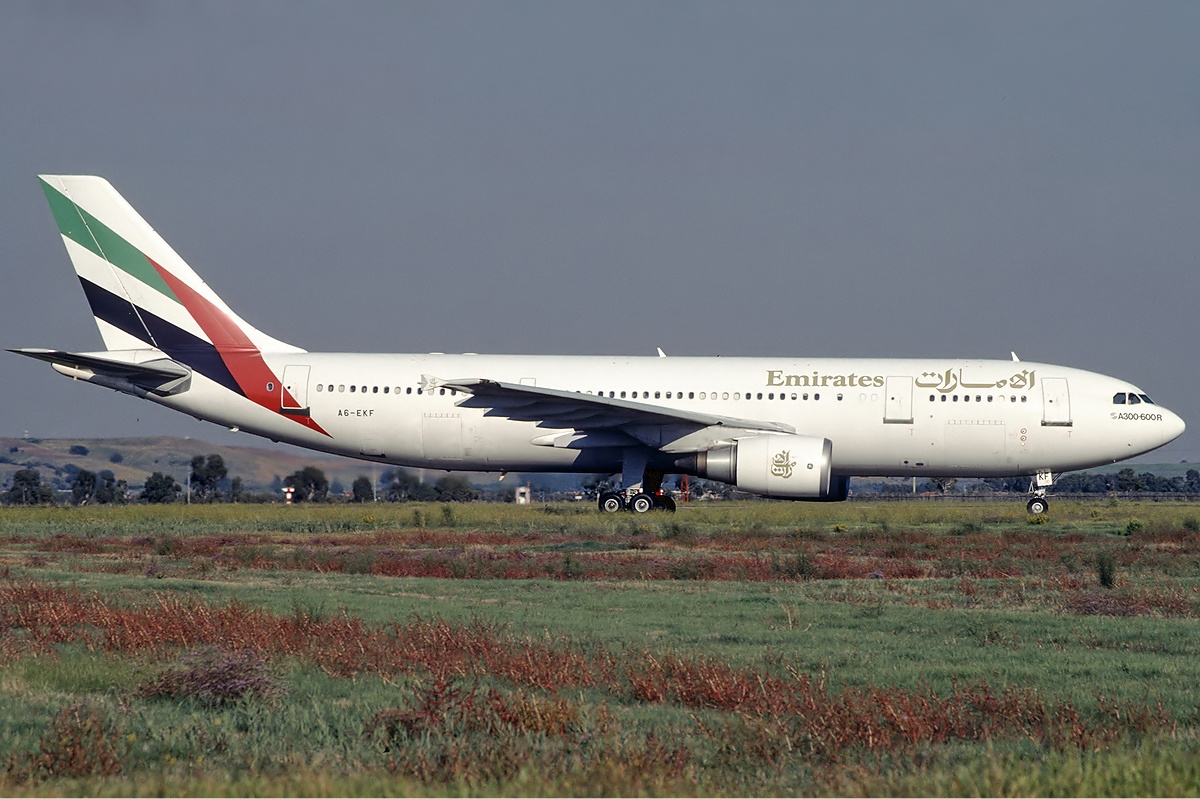
Emirates Airbus A300, one of the airline's early fleet (1995)

Maurice Flanagan, who previously worked at British Airways, Gulf Air, and BOAC and at the time was overseeing Dnata, was appointed chief executive officer of the new airline. To acknowledge his services for aviation, in 2000, Flanagan was made CBE in the Queen's Birthday Honour List, and later honoured with knighthood. He would be joined at the airline by Sheikh Ahmed bin Saeed Al Maktoum (as chairman) and now-Emirates president Tim Clark. Current chairman Sheikh Ahmed bin Saeed Al Maktoum has since inherited the role of CEO. During its first year, it carried about 260,000 passengers and 10,000 tons of freight. To highlight the airline's early success, Gulf Air, during Emirates' first year of operations, suffered a 56% drop in profits, and a loss the following year.

By 1986, the airline had added destinations such as Colombo, Dhaka, Amman and Cairo to its route network. In 1987, a second Boeing 727 was purchased from the Dubai Government and an A300 was temporarily replaced by a second example from Kuwait Airways. On 3 July, Emirates received its first bought aircraft, an Airbus A310 (registration A6-EKA), and with two examples, launched daily non-stop services to London Gatwick on 6 July 1987. The airline in 1987 added Frankfurt via Istanbul, and Malé (Maldives). By the end of 1987, Emirates was serving 11 destinations. This was followed by an expansion into the Far East market in 1989, with flights to Bangkok, Manila and Singapore, followed by Hong Kong and London Heathrow in 1991. During the first decade of operations, Emirates recorded strong growth averaging 30%.

== Incorporation and growth: 1993–1999 ==
By the early 1990s, Emirates was among the world's fastest-growing airlines; revenue increased approximately US$100 million each year, approaching US$500 million in the year 1993. The airline carried 1.6 million passengers and 68,000 tons of cargo in the same year.

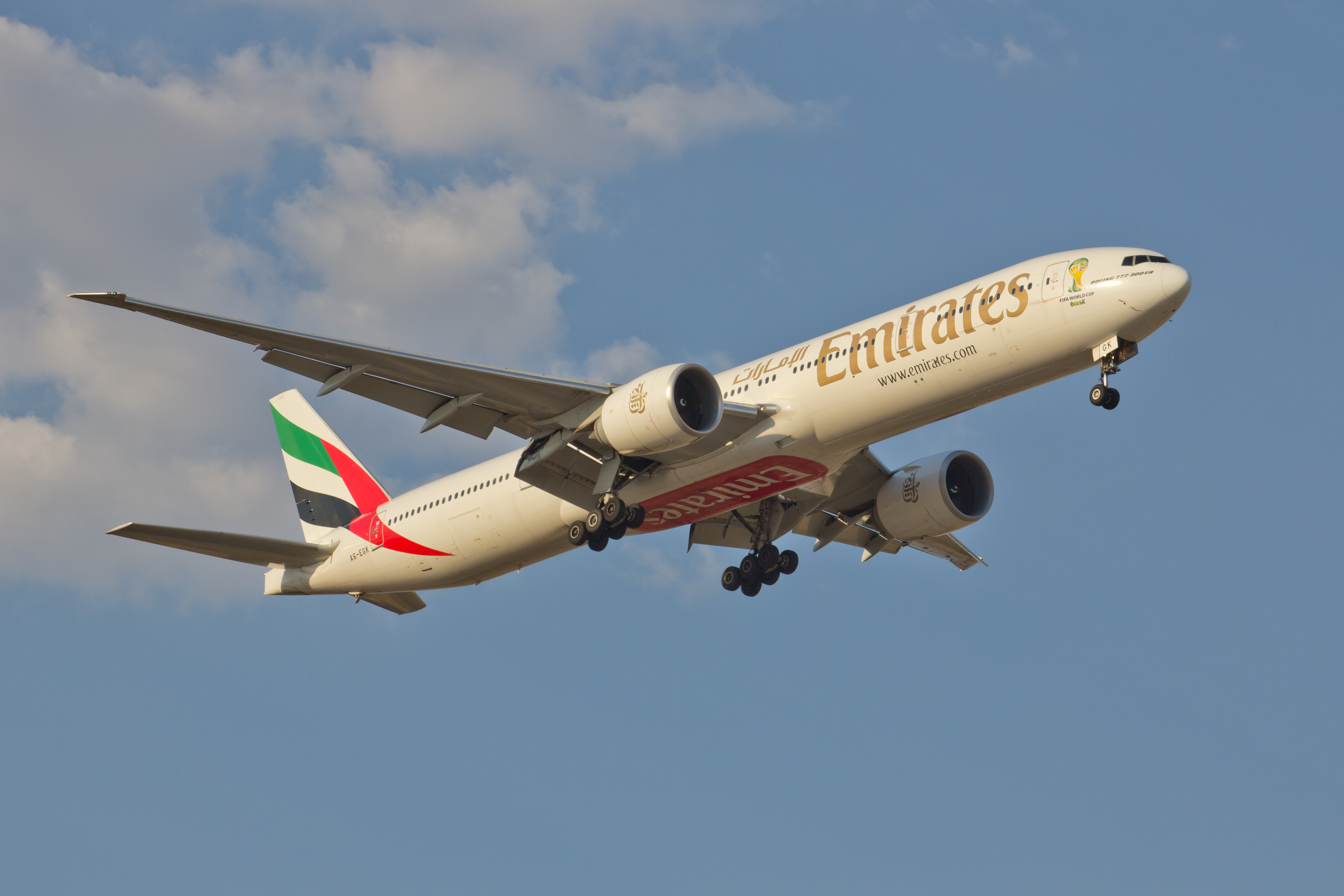
Emirates Boeing 777-300ER on approach to Madrid, Spain. Emirates is the world's largest operator of the Boeing 777 and the only airline to have operated every version of the aircraft.

With the onset of the Gulf War, business increased for Emirates as the war kept other airlines out of the area; it was the only airline to continue flying in the last ten days of the war. Following the conflicts, a total of 92 air carriers were flying to markets internationally and Emirates faced intense competition at its home base. It carried about three million passengers a year to Dubai International Airport in the mid-1990s. Emirates continued to expand during the late 1990s. The growing cargo business accounted for 16 percent of the airline's total revenues.

Emirates started offering round-the-world services from autumn 1993, after a partnership was established with US Airways. It previously had co-operation agreements with Cyprus Airways.

By 1995, the airline expanded the fleet to six Airbus A300s and eight Airbus A310s and built the network up to cover 37 destinations in 30 countries. In 1996, the airline received its first Boeing 777-200 aircraft, and was followed shortly thereafter by six Boeing 777-200ERs. The arrival of the 777s allowed Emirates to continue its Singapore service onward to Melbourne commencing in 1996 (the flight briefly operated as a Dubai-Jakarta-Melbourne service before being cut due to unprofitability; Emirates would only begin serving Jakarta nonstop again in 2006) which would become a very profitable route for Emirates and would see new destinations added in Australia. In 1998, Emirates Sky Cargo was launched. Although the Emirates had always provided a cargo service using capacity within its passenger aircraft, this was now expanded with an aircraft, crew, maintenance and insurance lease with Atlas Air, initially for a single Boeing 747-200 freighter.

In May 1998, Emirates paid the Government of Sri Lanka US$70 million for a 43.6% stake in SriLankan Airlines (then known as Air Lanka). As part of the deal, Emirates received a 10-year contract to manage SriLankan. In January 2008, Emirates announced that it would end the management contract, effective April 2008. Emirates subsequently sold its stake in the airline to the Government of Sri Lanka, in an estimated US$150 million deal that was finalised in 2010, thus ending any affiliation the two airlines had with each other. On 9 November 2013, Emirates airline unveiled its first light sport aircraft to the world.

== Modern history: 2000–present ==
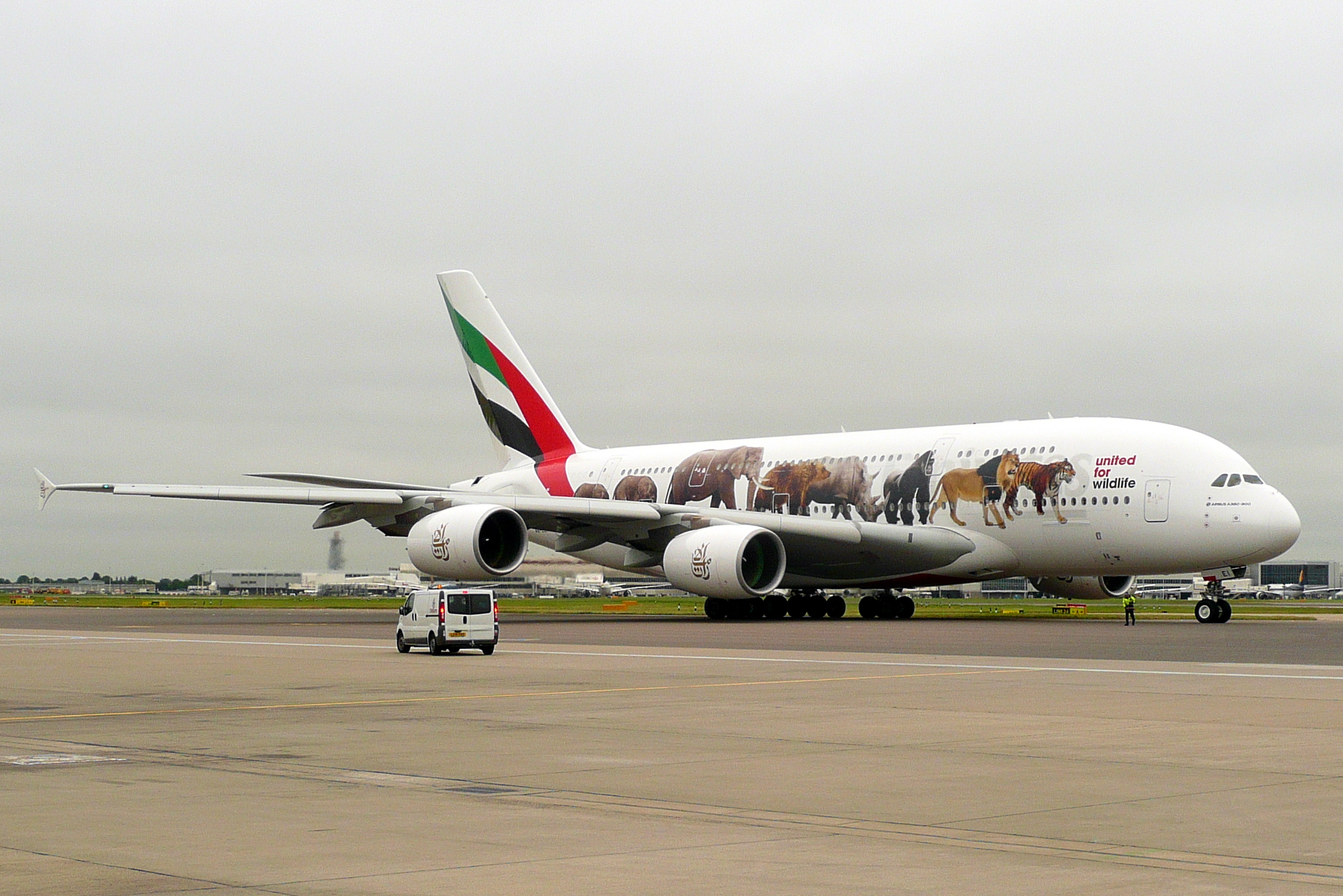
An Emirates Airbus A380 in the "United for Wildlife" livery (2016)

In 2000, Emirates placed an order for twenty-five Boeing 777-300s, eight Airbus A340-500s, three Airbus A330-200s and twenty-two of the double-decker A380. Its frequent flyer programme, Skywards, was also launched in 2000 as the airline grew. Towards the end of the year, Emirates planned to start long-haul services to the East Coast and West Coast of the United States, as well as non-stop flights to Australia and Brazil. During 2002, Emirates passenger figures increased 18% to over 6.8 million against the previous year.

The financial year 2001–02 would prove to be very difficult for Emirates and one of the toughest for the airline. Initially, sales were affected by a recession and later influenced by the bombing of Colombo Airport. The bombing destroyed three of SriLankan Airlines' twelve aircraft and damaged three other aircraft. A few months later, the September 11 attacks in New York City saw thousands of cancellations and deferments of travel plans. Emirates needed to find funds for a spike in its multibillion-dollar insurance cover due to the events. Seat factors fell considerably and profitability disappeared. The airline announced a recruitment freeze, but did not make any redundancies. The airline also reduced flight frequencies to other destinations. The unstable situation in the region, however, benefited Emirates as international airlines cut flights to Dubai and lowered competition.

At the 2003 Paris Air Show, Emirates signed an order for 71 aircraft at a cost of US$19 billion. The order included firm purchase orders for a further 21 Airbus A380-800s and lease orders for two A380-800s. Emirates also announced operating lease orders for 26 Boeing 777-300ERs.

In 2004, Emirates began flying non-stop to New York City's John F. Kennedy International Airport using its new Airbus A340-500. These flights meant the resumption of non-stop air services between the United Arab Emirates and the United States, after Delta Air Lines withdrew its flights in 2001, and restarted again in 2007. In the same year, Emirates signed a £100 million deal with English Premier League football team Arsenal, which includes naming rights to its new stadium for 15 years and shirt sponsorship for eight years, starting in the 2006/07 season. In 2005, Emirates ordered 42 Boeing 777s in a deal worth $9.7 billion, the largest Boeing 777 order in history.

Emirates has steadily captured traffic from South Asia to North America, allowing passengers to bypass the hubs of British Airways, Lufthansa, and Air France, with a transit stop at Dubai International Airport instead. South Asia has remained an important region for the Emirates network. Pakistan was the first country to receive flights and since then, Emirates operates to five destinations in the country. India was the second country to receive flights from Emirates, and Emirates is expanding its network there. Emirates is the largest airline operating internationally in India and operates over 185 flights a week across 10 cities. Similarly, Emirates competes with British Airways, Cathay Pacific, Malaysia Airlines, Qantas, Philippine Airlines, Singapore Airlines, Thai Airways International, Middle Eastern rivals Etihad Airways and Qatar Airways, and other airlines on the lucrative London to Sydney Kangaroo Route.

In 2007, Emirates made an order worth over $34.9 billion, at the Dubai Air Show. The airline signed contracts for 120 Airbus A350s, 11 A380s and 12 Boeing 777-300ERs. By opening flights to São Paulo in 2007, Emirates began the first non-stop flight between the Middle East and South America; it also began operations of its $120 million Flight Catering Centre at Dubai Airport.

In 2009, Emirates became the world's largest operator of the Boeing 777 with the delivery of its 78th example of the type. In 2010, at the Farnborough Airshow, the airline placed an order for 30 Boeing 777s, worth $9.1 billion, bringing total spending for aircraft in the year to over $25 billion. In 2011, at the Dubai Airshow, Emirates placed another order for another 50 777s, worth about $18 billion.

The growth of Emirates has drawn criticism from carriers such as Lufthansa and Air Canada, who claim Emirates has unfair advantages. Lufthansa has continuously lobbied the German government to limit the expansion of Emirates into Germany, and hasn't allowed Emirates to begin operations to Berlin and Stuttgart since 2004. Similarly, Air Canada has objected to any expansion into Canada from Emirates. The dispute has received attention from the governments of the UAE and Canada and despite many discussions from both governments, Emirates has not been given more landing rights in Canada beyond Toronto, and has been denied expansion to Calgary and Vancouver.

Emirates has also been criticized over the way it utilises its staff. In a 2015 Wall Street Journal report, "a dozen current and former Emirates pilots and U.A.E. aviation officials ... said pilots are flying more hours than before and are subjected to onerous procedures to report sickness or fatigue, discouraging them from doing so." The report stated that the airline frequently underreported pilot duty time to the General Civil Aviation Authority.

On 6 September 2012, it was announced Emirates and Qantas had signed a 10-year agreement to set up a major alliance, which would see Qantas move its hub for its European flights from Singapore to Dubai International Airport and end its 17-year revenue-sharing agreement with British Airways on the services between Australia and Britain. Emirates would also seek to use the alliance to increase the number of its passengers flying on its routes to other European destinations, and Emirates passengers gained access to Qantas’ Australian domestic network of more than 50 destinations.

Qantas began daily Airbus A380 services from both Sydney and Melbourne to London via Dubai, meaning that together the two airlines were providing 98 weekly flights between Australia and the Emirates hub. Qantas became the only other airline operating at Terminal 3 at Dubai International Airport. The airlines aligned their frequent-flyer programs, including Emirates adding a new level to match the Qantas platinum level. As of August 2013, the partnership between the two airlines included code-sharing, aligned fares and frequent flyer benefits for passengers, as well as the opening of a joint New Zealand network on 14 August. Qantas will terminate services to Dubai on its own aircraft, effective March 2018; however the partnership will continue, with the two airlines applying for approval to extend it to 2023.

At the 2013 Dubai Air Show, Emirates made aviation orders history with an order for 150 Boeing 777X and 50 Airbus A380 aircraft, with an estimated value of $166 billion. The deliveries of the 777X are scheduled to start in 2020, replacing older aircraft and paving way for growth, said Emirates Chairman and CEO Sheikh Ahmed Bin Saeed Al Maktoum. The airline announced its plans to move all operations to Dubai World Central – Al Maktoum International Airport sometime after 2020 when the airport's first phase is complete. In April 2024, Emirates announced its plan to relocate its hub to Al Maktoum Airport by 2034 at the latest.

In 2024, after two years, Emirates resumed international flights to Nigeria after the Nigerian central bank paid what was due to the airline.

In 2026, an Emirates A380 of an unknown registration was damaged by debris during the Iranian Attacks on the United Arab Emirates in the 2026 Iran War.

=== Airbus A380 ===
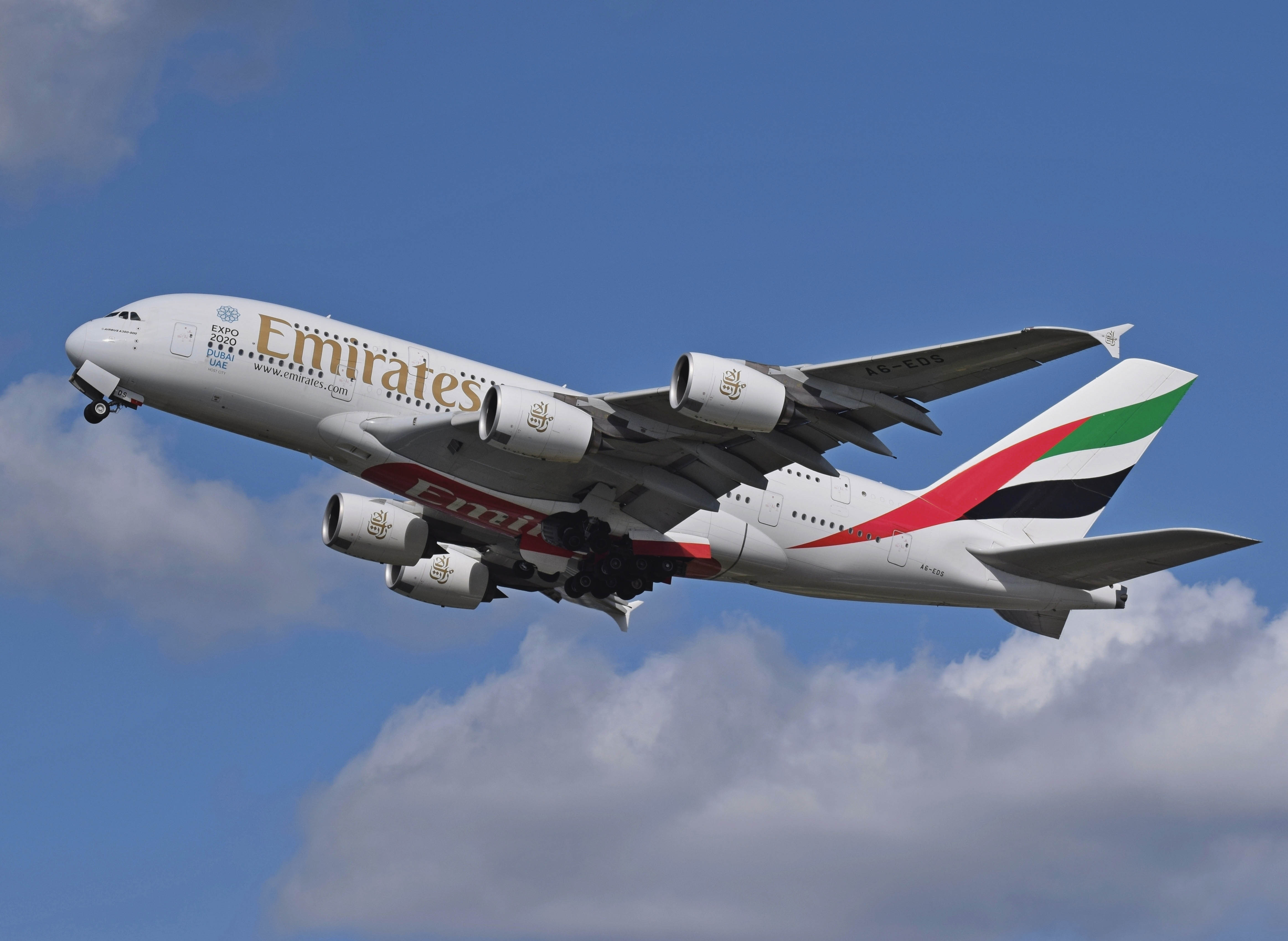
An Emirates Airbus A380 departs London Heathrow Airport (2015).

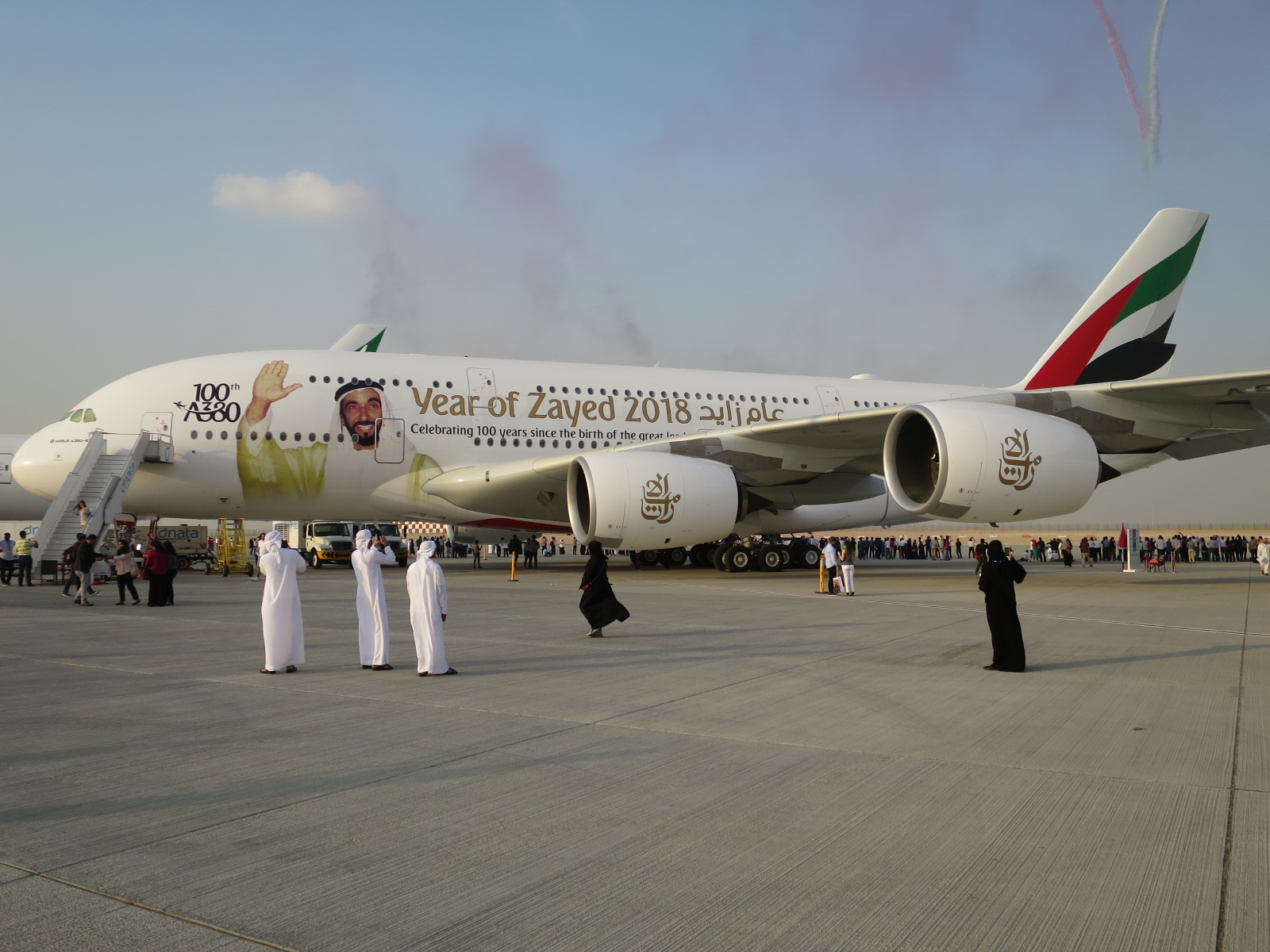
Emirates' 100th A380 at Dubai Air Show 2017

In April 2000, Emirates announced an order for the Airbus A3XX (later named Airbus A380), the largest widebody airliner ever built. The deal consisted of five A380-800 passenger aircraft and two freighter versions. The deal was confirmed on 4 November 2001, when Emirates announced orders for 15 more A380-800s. An additional order for 21 A380-800s was placed two years later. In April 2006, Emirates replaced its order for the two freighter variants with an order for two A380-800s. In 2007, Emirates ordered 15 A380-800s, bringing the total ordered to 58. According to Emirates, the aircraft would allow the airline to maximize its use of scarce takeoff and landing slots at crowded airports such as London Heathrow Airport. In 2005, the first A380-800 in full Emirates livery was displayed at the Dubai Airshow.

On 20 November 2005, Emirates ordered 42 Boeing 777s, to help with its expansion. This order came one day after Airbus announced the A380-800 would be delayed by another six months. A third delay was announced on 3 October 2006, pushing the delivery of the first A380-800 to October 2007. The announcement was met with anger by Emirates' President Tim Clark, who threatened to cancel the Airbus order as it was affecting the airline's expansion plan, saying that "It's very serious. This will do us serious damage". As of April 2008, Airbus had paid as much as $110 million in compensation for the late delivery of the A380-800 to Emirates. During the same year, on 1 August, Emirates flew its first A380-800 flight, from Dubai to New York City-JFK.

In February 2009, Emirates raised many issues concerning its A380s. Emirates informed Airbus officials about heat-damaged power cables, defective engines and numerous malfunctions, many reportedly caused by the aircraft's two showers.

At the 2010 Berlin Air Show, Emirates ordered an additional 32 A380s worth US$11.5 billion. Emirates expected all of its 90 A380s ordered to be delivered by 2017. None of the additional 32 jets were intended to replace existing A380s; although Emirates received its first A380 in 2008, it does not expect to retire these early airframes before 2020.

In 2010, Emirates said it planned to operate over 120 Airbus A380s when new airport space is available. The target implied a future Emirates order for 30 A380s, worth US$10 billion at list prices, at an unspecified date.

On 17 November 2013, Emirates announced at a press conference at the Dubai Airshow that it was placing an order for an additional 50 Airbus A380-800s, bringing the overall order total to 140.

On 9 April 2015, Emirates CEO and President Tim Clark confirmed that the airline would adopt a two-class A380 with first class removed to make way for 615 passengers across business and economy class cabins. The first commercial service of an aircraft in this cabin configuration was a flight from Dubai to Copenhagen on 1 December 2015.

Emirates is the largest operator of the A380, with the 100th A380 joining its fleet in November 2017.

On 18 January 2018, it was reported that Emirates had placed an order for 20 A380s with options for 16 more with deliveries to start in 2020.

Emirates' A380s were originally all powered by Engine Alliance GP7200 engines. In a deal worth US$9.2 billion, Rolls-Royce announced in April 2015 that it would supply engines for 50 new Airbus A380s (termed A380CEO), with first delivery due in mid-2016. On 29 December 2016, the first Emirates Rolls-Royce-powered A380 landed at Dubai airport (Registration A6-EUM).

=== Dubai International Terminal 3 ===
Dubai International Airport's Terminal 3 was built exclusively for the use of Emirates at a cost of $4.5 billion and officially opened 14 October 2008. Terminal 3 is the second largest building in the world by floor space, with over 1,713,000 m^{2} (423 acres) of space. It is second only to the New Century Global Center.The terminal has annual capacity of 43 million passengers. The new concourse A opened on 2 January 2013 and is built exclusively for the A380-800.

In May 2011, Paul Griffiths, chief executive of Dubai Airports revealed that Emirates will eventually take over the operation of Concourse C, along with Concourses B and A.

=== Dreamliner orders ===
On November 12, 2017, Emirates Airline "renewed its aircraft buying spree" and agreed to buy a number of Boeing's 787 Dreamliners for $15.1 billion. With the first deliveries planned for 2022, the deal included 40 of the new 787-10, the largest available Dreamliner. The Wall Street Journal described the deal as a "painful loss" for Airbus, which until 2014, Emirates had a firm order for 70 of its A350 model. The order for the 787 had been announced during the Dubai Airshow, and Airbus executives were reportedly seated in the front row, expecting a deal for more A380 super-jumbos.
