= Dubai Airshow =

Biennial air show held in Dubai, United Arab Emirates

Dubai Airshow معرض دبي للطيران
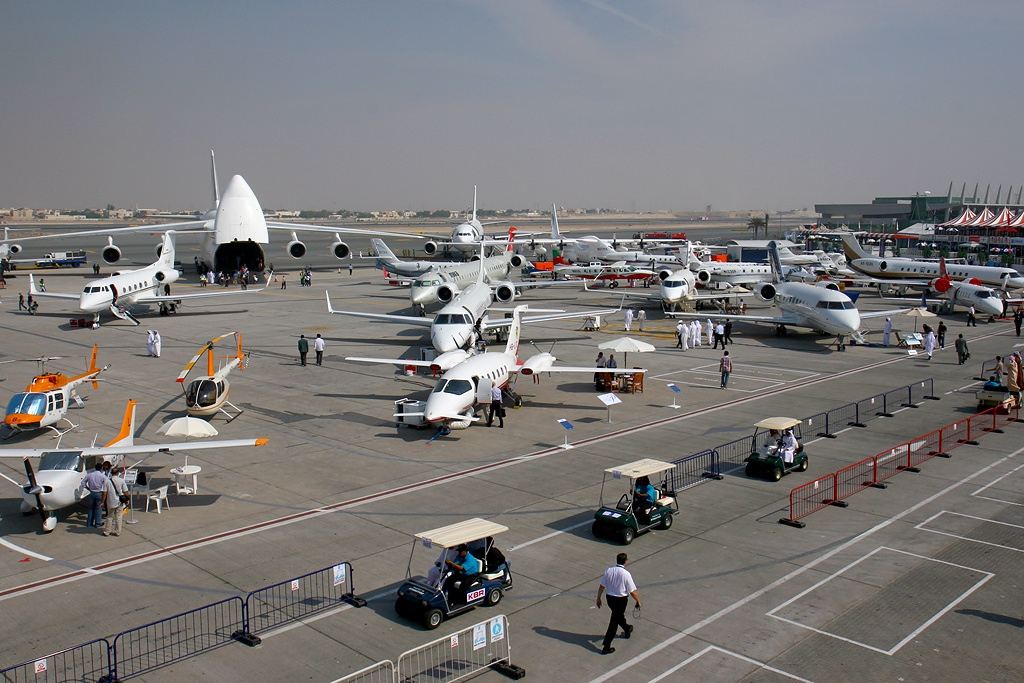
- 2007 static display
- Status: Active
- Genre: Air show
- Dates: November
- Frequency: Biennial (odd years)
- Venue: Al Maktoum International Airport
- Location: Dubai World Central
- Coordinates: 25°55′00″N 55°10′00″E
- Country: United Arab Emirates
- Established: 1986; 40 years ago
- Most recent: 2025
- Next event: 2027
- Attendance: 248,788 (2025)
- Major events: Trade exhibition, aerobatic and static displays
- Organizer: Informa
- Website: dubaiairshow.aero

The Dubai Airshow (Arabic: معرض دبي للطيران) is a biennial air show held in Dubai, United Arab Emirates. It is the largest air show in the Middle East and the third largest air show in the world after Paris Air Show and Farnborough Airshow.

The air show is organized in cooperation with Dubai Civil Aviation Authority, Dubai Airports, Dubai World Central and the UAE Armed Forces.

== History ==
Dubai Airshow was organised by Tarsus Aerospace between 1989 and 2021. Since 2023, the exhibition is organised by Informa.

=== 1986 ===
The Dubai Airshow started life as Arab Air in 1986 - a small civil aviation trade show which F&E organised at the Dubai World Trade Centre.

=== 1989 ===
The first Dubai Airshow was held in 1989 at Dubai Airport, spurred on by substantial Middle East investment in civil and military aviation. The Dubai Airshow grew from 200 exhibitors and 25 aircraft in 1989.

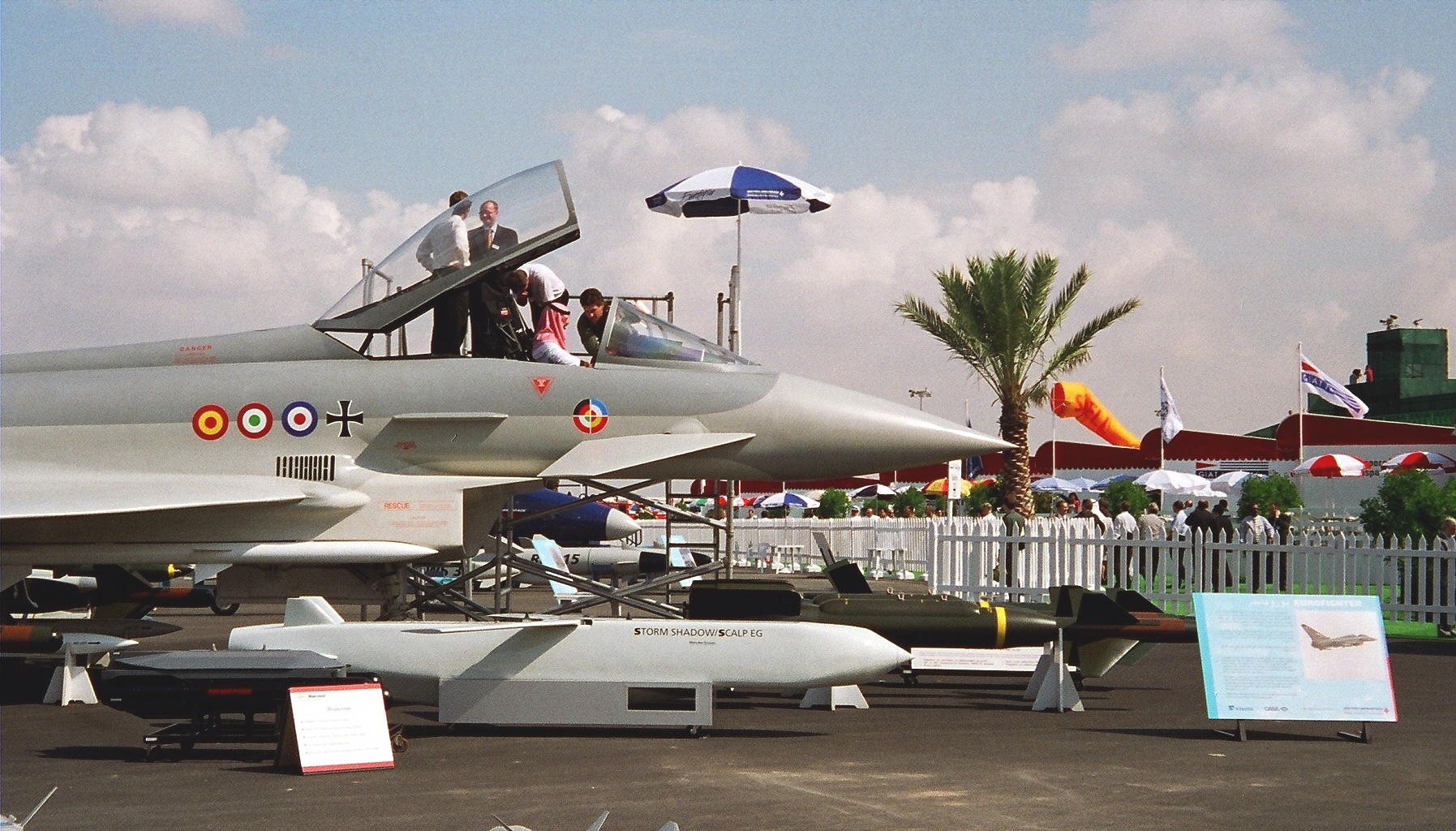
A Eurofighter in 1998

=== 1991 ===
In 1991 due to the outbreak of the Gulf War, the show was moved from January to November and it had a strong military focus given events in the region.

=== 2001 ===
The 2001 show took place just six weeks after the events of September 11, 2001, and closed with record order book of US$15.6 billion.

=== 2003 ===
The Dubai Airshow 2003 was the fastest-selling in the event's history, 550 companies from 36 countries participated.

=== 2005 ===
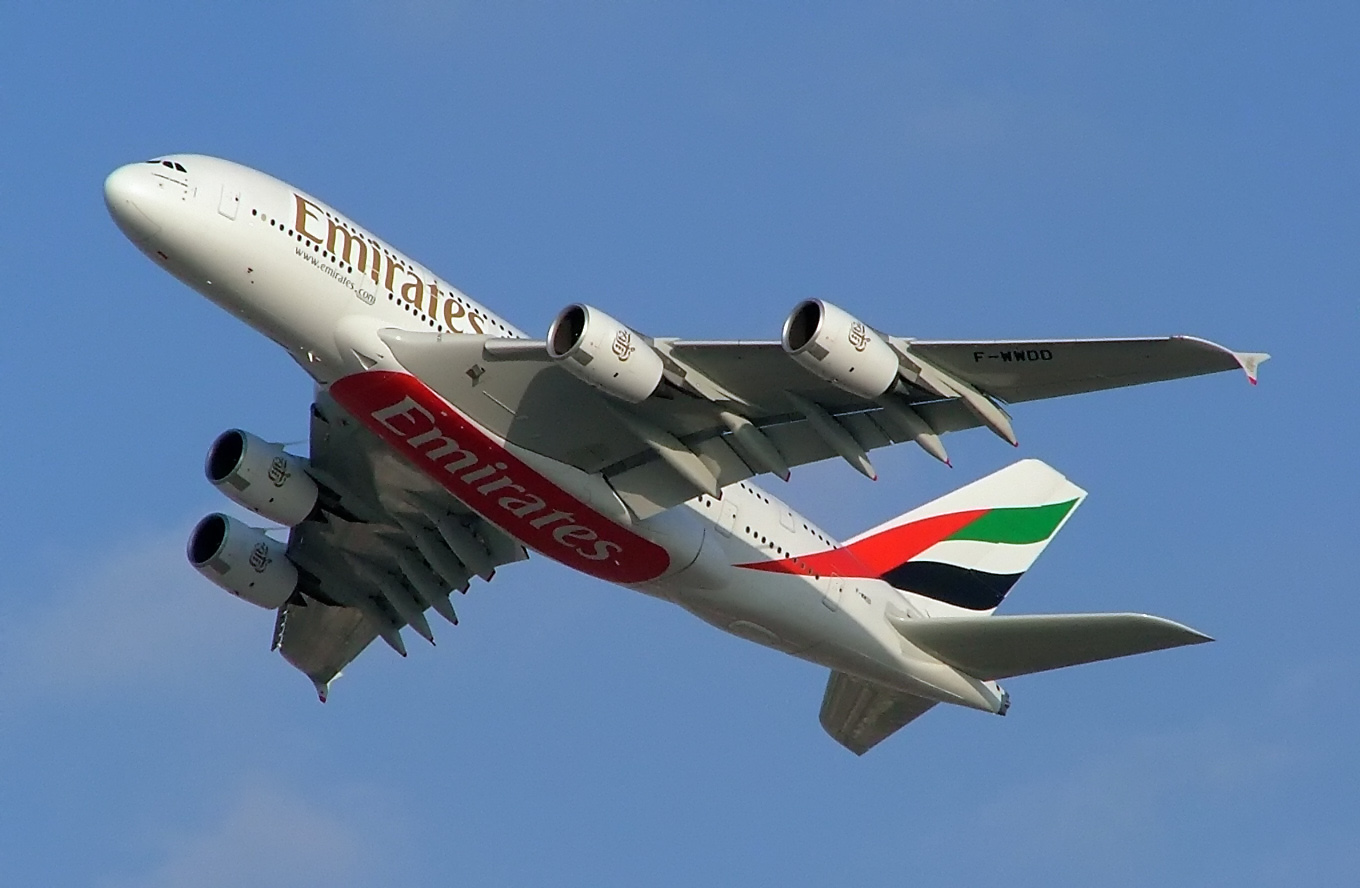
An Emirates Airbus A380 in 2005

In 2005 the Airshow hosted the debut of the A380 in the Middle East. It arrived in full Emirates livery for its largest customer.

=== 2013 ===
In 2013, 1,046 exhibitors came from 60 countries, drawing 60,692 trade attendees for a record $206.1 billion order book of aircraft, parts and MRO deals. The display presented 163 aircraft. Emirates made the highest price airliner order with $99 billion for 150 newly launched Boeing 777Xs plus 50 options and 50 Airbus A380s.

=== 2017 ===
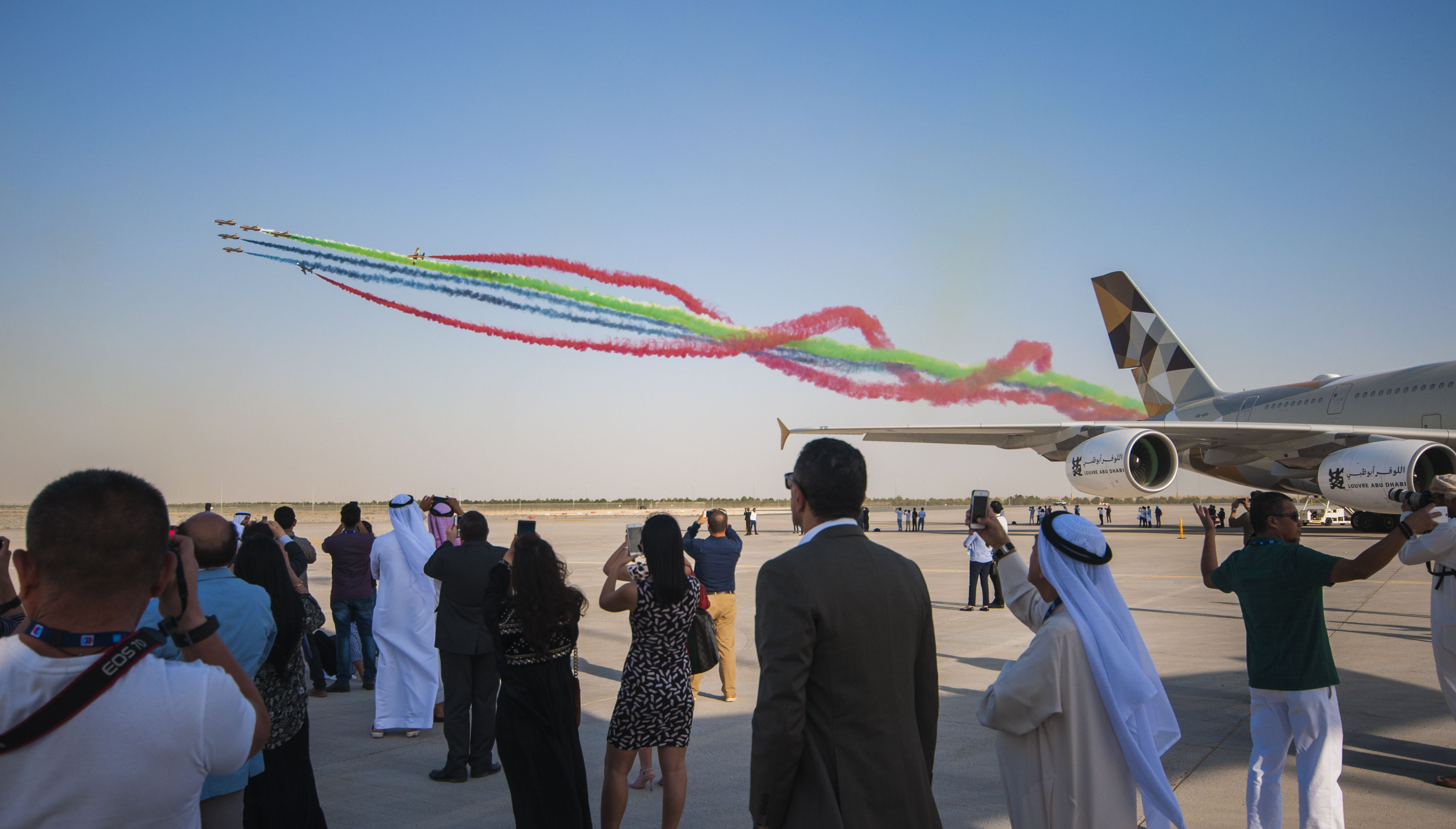
2017 aerobatics display team

Airbus displayed the A350-900 and A319 airliners, and the A400M and C-295 military airlifters, Beriev its Be-200ES jet amphibian, Boeing the 737 MAX 8 and 787-10 jetliners, Bombardier Aerospace the CS300 small narrowbody, Embraer its Phenom 100 small business jet, and Sukhoi its Superjet 100 regional jet. Organizers forecast 9% more visitors than in 2015 to 72,000, joined by 1,200 exhibitors, 1,350 media representatives and 160 aircraft on display and claims to be the largest after Le Bourget and Farnborough, but before Singapore Airshow by number of exhibitors, square meters and visitors.

On November 12, Emirates committed to purchase 40 Boeing 787-10s in two- and three-class cabins for 240 to 330 passengers, to be delivered from 2022 with conversion rights to the smaller Boeing 787-9, pushing orders for the 787-10 from 171 to over 200. The order is worth $15.1 billion at list prices.

On November 15, Indigo Partners (unrelated to Indian LCC IndiGo) signed a memorandum of understanding for 430 Airbus: 273 A320neos and 157 A321neos for $49.5 billion at list prices; Indigo controls Frontier Airlines and Chilean low-cost start-up JetSmart, holds stakes in Mexican budget airline Volaris and European LCC Wizz Air: 146 aircraft will go to Wizz, 134 to Frontier, 80 to Volaris and 70 to JetSmart. The same day, Flydubai commit to order 175 Boeing 737 Max and 50 purchase rights for $27 billion at list prices: Max 8s, Max 9s and 50 Max 10s.

In 2017, 874 commitments and options were announced including 15% firm, compared with 67 in 2015 and 684 in 2013, 74.9% from LCCs, 15.7% from lessors and 8.1% from mainline carriers. These were mainly narrowbodies with 825 against 47 widebodies, Airbus had 547 commitments for a $28.2 Billion market value and Boeing had 301 for $19.5 Billion.

=== 2019 ===
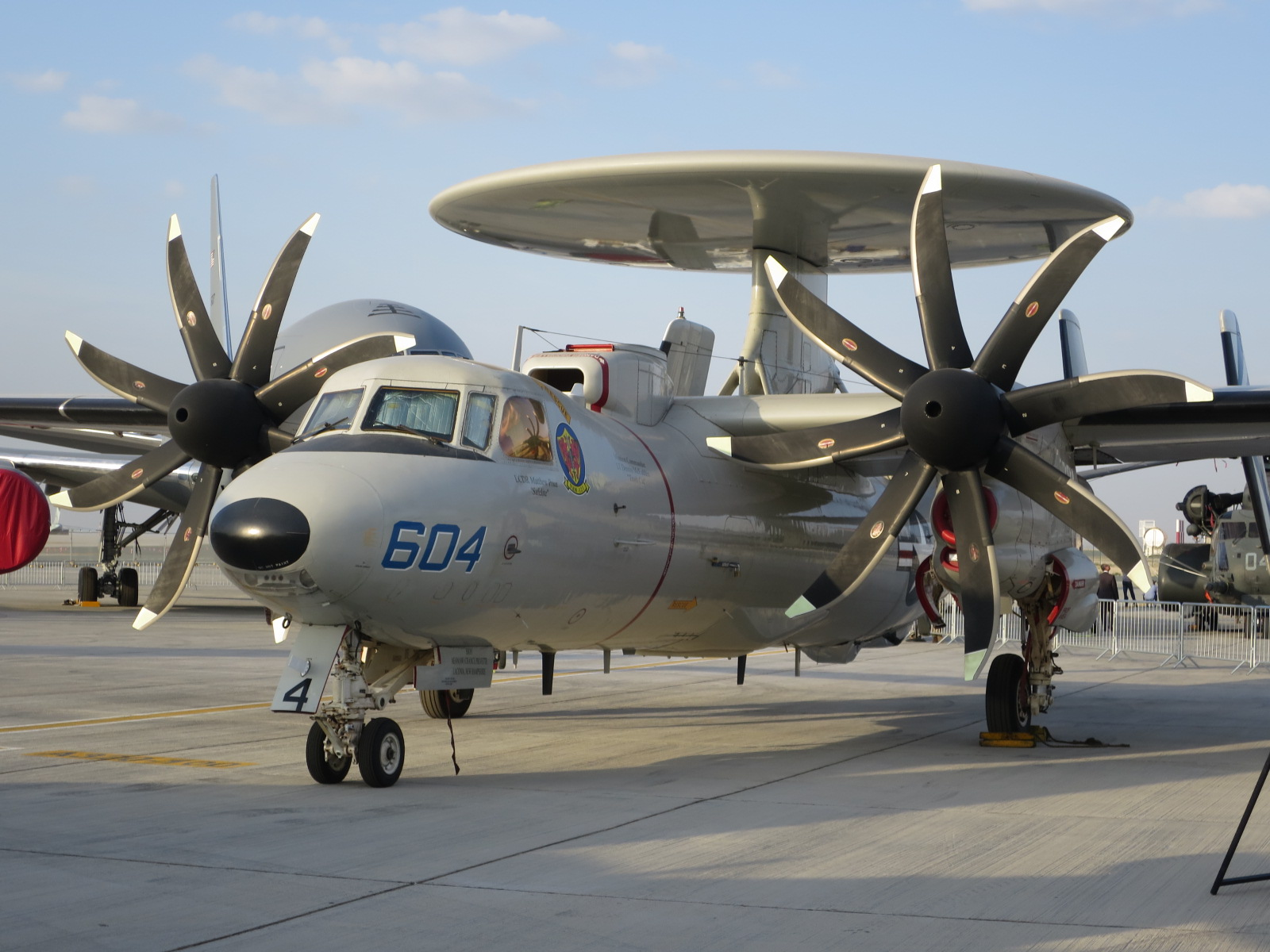
Grumman E-2D Hawkeye at the Dubai Airshow 2019

On the opening day of the Dubai Airshow 2019, Sheikh Mohammed bin Zayed and Sheikh Hamdan took a private tour the latest Emirates A380. A similar aircraft also led the way during the opening procession of the Dubai Airshow 2019.

On 18 November 2019, the second day of the biennial airshow, Emirates announced an order worth a total of $16 billion for 50 Airbus A350-900 aircraft. The delivery for the largest deal of Airbus was scheduled to begin from May 2023. Also on the 18th, Air Arabia ordered for 120 Airbus A320 family aircraft, including 73 of the high-efficiency A320neo variants and 23 A321XLR with a total book value in excess of $14 billion.

On 19 November, Emirates signed an agreement to purchase 30 Boeing 787-9 Dreamliner aircraft. The deal was valued at $8.8 billion.

The order book on site reached $54.5 billion by close of business at the Dubai Airshow 2019. The 2019 Dubai Airshow attracted 84,043 visitors.

=== 2021 ===
The 2021 Dubai Airshow began on 14 November 2021 and lasted for 5 days until 18 November 2021.

Indigo Partners placed firm orders for 255 A321 Neo aircraft. Jazeera Airways placed an order for 28 A321 Neos. Ibom Air ordered 10 A220s. Air Lease Corporation ordered seven A350 freighters. On November 16, Indian airline Akasa Air also placed an order for 72 Boeing 737 MAX aircraft. Jetex was the official FBO at the show.

The Sukhoi Su-75 Checkmate made its international debut at the show.

Israeli companies, including Israel Aerospace Industries and Rafael Advanced Defense Systems participated at the show for the first time.

=== 2023 ===
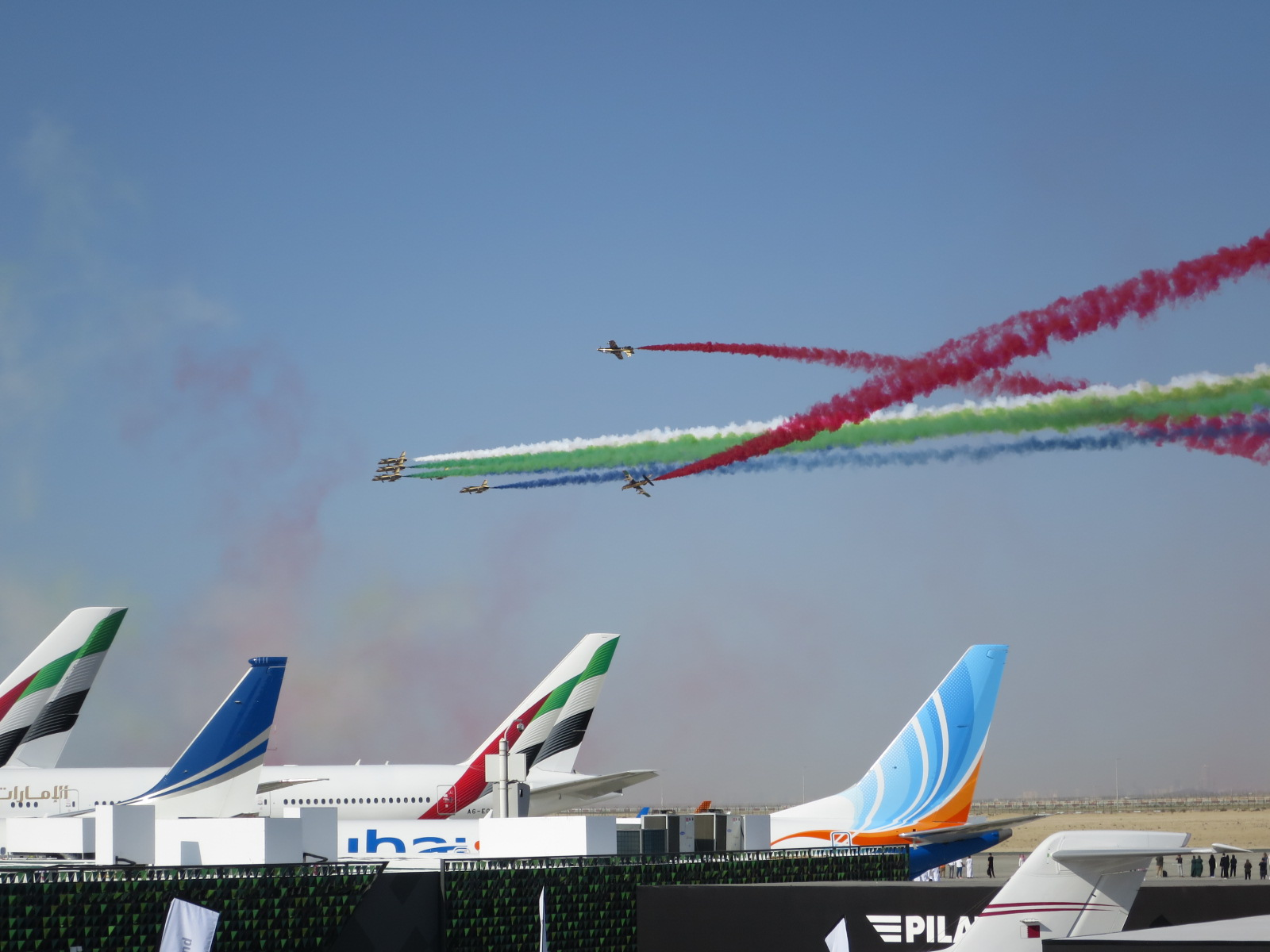
Al Fursan at Dubai Airshow 2023

The 2023 Dubai Airshow was held from 13 to 17 November 2023.

On 13 November, Emirates placed an order for 90 777Xs; Flydubai placed an order for 30 787-9s; and SunExpress placed an order for 28 737-8s and 17 737-10s with options for a further 45. Also airBaltic placed an order for 30 Airbus A220-300s.

On 14 November, Ethiopian Airlines placed an order for 20 737-8s with options for a further 21 and an order for 11 787-9s with options for a further 15; Egyptair ordered ten A350-900s.

On 16 November, Emirates placed an order for 15 A350-900s.

Aircraft making their initial appearances at the Dubai airshow included the: Boeing F-15QA; Chengdu J-10s of the August 1st (aerobatic team) and KAI KUH-1 Surion and KAI LAH.

Russia operated its own pavilion separate from the main exhibition hall. Russian equipment on display included the Ka-52E and the Il-76MD-90AE. The Russian Knights performed in the flying program. The show resulted in no new deals for Russian aircraft.

Israeli pavilions were unstaffed after the Israeli Ministry of Defense instructed companies such as Israel Aerospace Industries and Rafael Advanced Defense Systems not to attend due to security concerns arising from the Gaza war.

=== 2025 ===
Dubai Airshow 2025 was held from 17 to 21 November.

Emirates announced plans to install Starlink on all 232 commercial aircraft in its fleet within the next two years. Emirates also confirmed a $38 billion order for 65 new Boeing 777-9 aircraft and a separate order of 130 GE9X engines from GE Aerospace.

Flydubai also announced plans to implement Starlink in its fleet, the introduction of premium economy cabins, and a $13 billion order for 75 Boeing 737 MAX aircraft.

On 19 November 2025, Avolon, a global aviation finance company, has agreed to lease five Airbus A320neo family aircraft to Centrum Air, a carrier launched in 2023 and Uzbekistan’s largest private airline.

In 2025, organizers confirmed that Israeli defense and security companies would not participate in the exhibition. According to Timothy Hawes, Managing Director of Informa Markets, the decision followed a “technical review” applied to all exhibitors. Media outlets described the move as a ban on defense firms amid heightened regional tensions due to the ongoing conflict in Gaza.

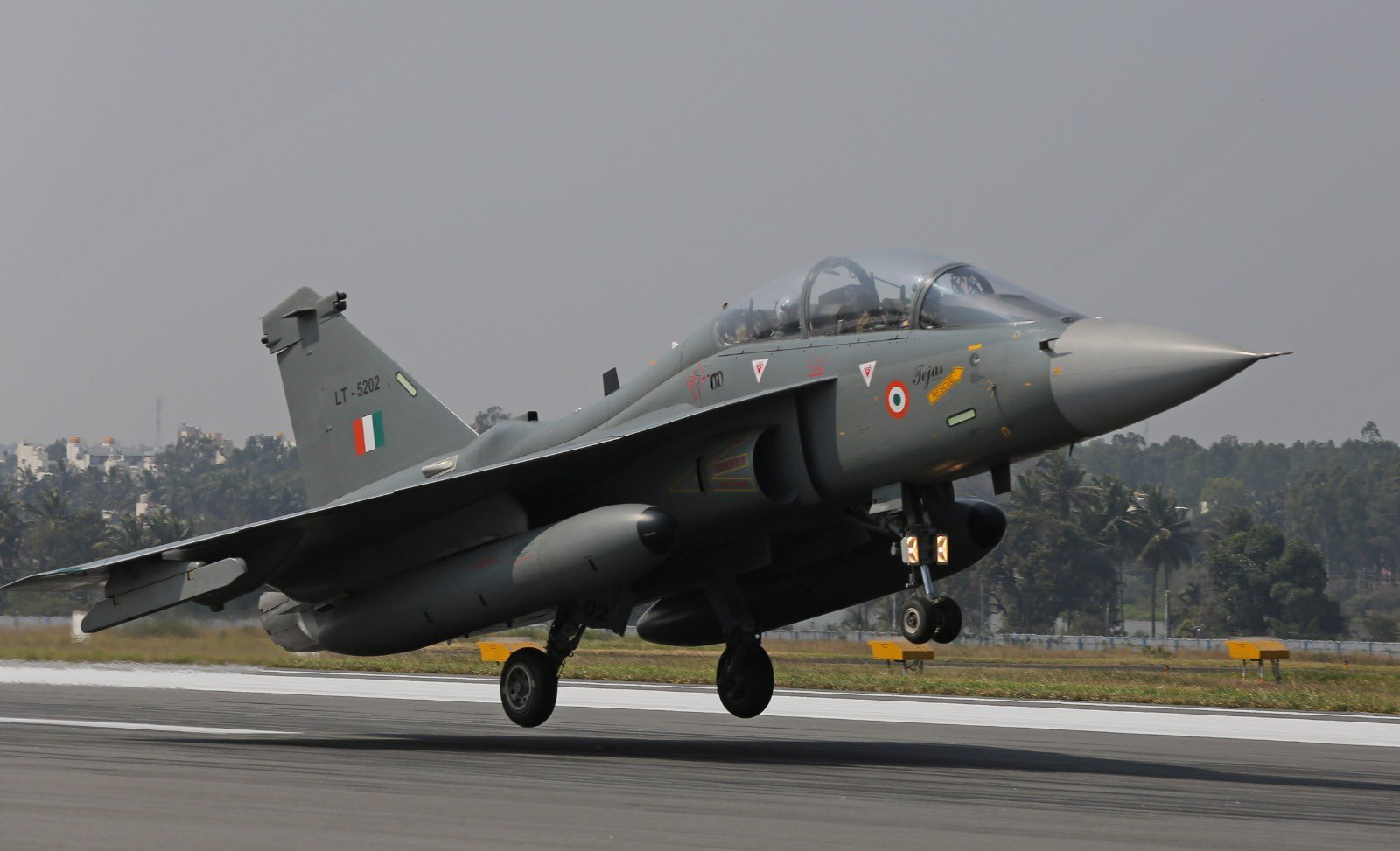
Trainer variant of the HAL Tejas similar to the incident aircraft

On 21 November, the final day of the event, an Indian HAL Tejas crashed while performing aerobatic maneuvers at around 2:10 PM. The pilot, 34-year-old IAF Wing Commander Namansh Syal, was killed in the crash. The succeeding aerial stunts were all cancelled temporarily, however they resumed two hours after the crash with a performance by the Russian Sukhoi Su-57. The Russian Knights aerobatics team performed the missing man formation to salute the fallen IAF pilot.

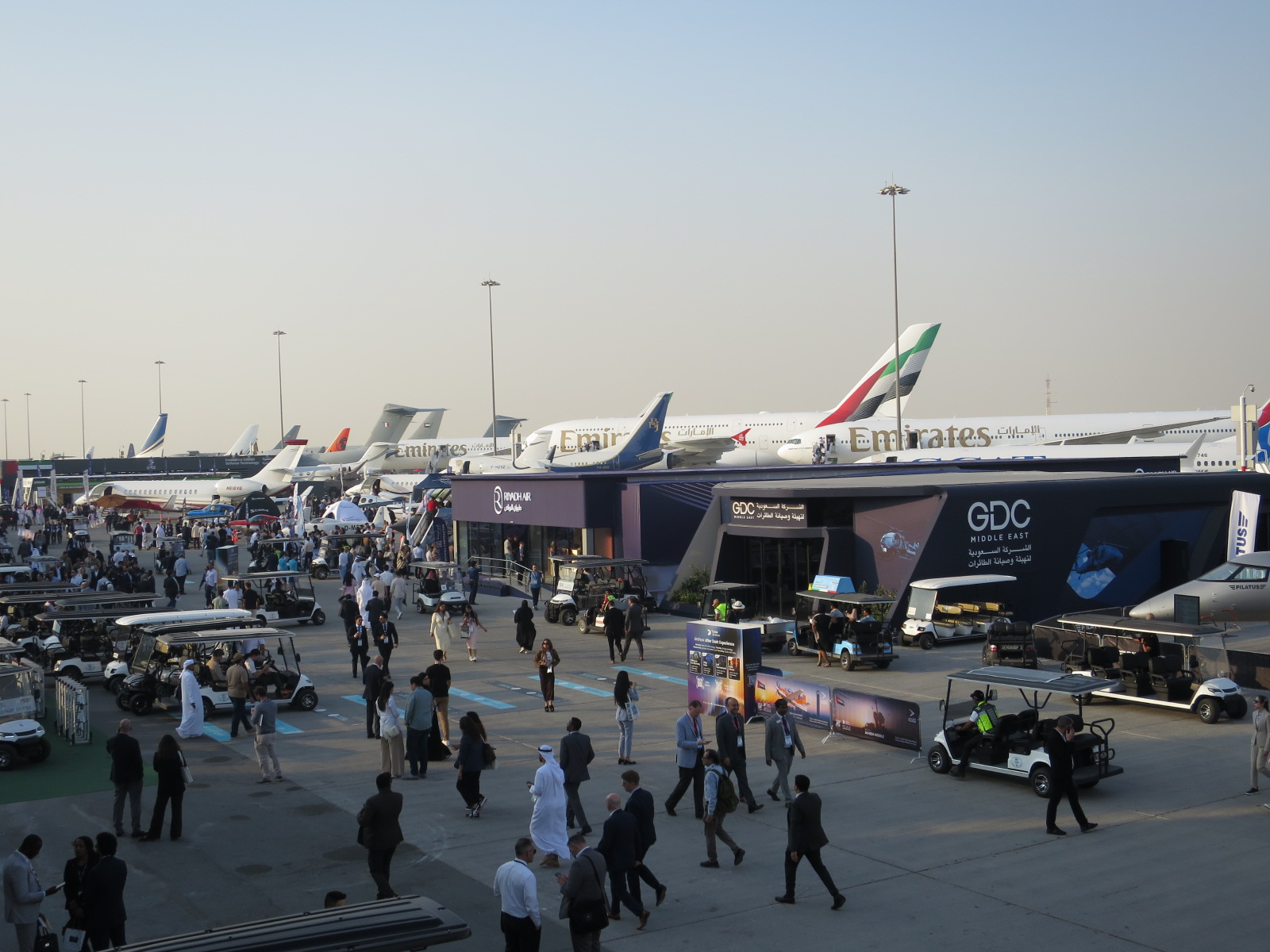
Static line 1 at the Dubai Airshow 2025

== Flying display ==
2011 aerobatics display team video

The flying display demonstrates the technical capabilities of exhibiting companies' aircraft. The flying display at the Dubai Airshow has included the Airbus A380, Airbus A400M, F-16, F/A-18, F-22 Raptor, V-22 Osprey, B-1B, Eurofighter Typhoon and the HAL Tejas. Aerobatic teams from across the world have attended, including the Patrouille de France, the Red Arrows, Al Fursan and Surya Kiran.

In recent editions, the flying display has also featured newer commercial and military aircraft introduced by global manufacturers. Demonstrations have included modern wide-body airliners, updated business jets, and advanced fighter aircraft showcased by participating nations. The 2021 edition, for example, included displays by the Boeing 777X, Airbus A350, and several unmanned aerial systems presented during the show.
