= Liberated Areas =

Liberated Area(s) or Liberated Zone(s) may refer to:

== Liberated Area(s) ==
- Liberated Areas (Oman), territory formerly occupied by the Dhofar Liberation Front, the Popular Front for the Liberation of the Occupied Arabian Gulf, and later the Popular Front for the Liberation of Oman
- Liberated Areas (Sudan), areas of Sudan occupied be the Sudan Liberation Movement (al-Nur)
- Syrian Salvation Government, former quasi-state in Syria
- Liberated Area of Cambodia, former territory of the Kampuchean United Front for National Salvation
- Ta'ang People's Government, territory of the TNLA
- People's Government of Kokang, territory of the MNDAA
  - Hongyan liberated areas, subdivision of the People's Government of Kokang
- New Sudan (territory), also known as the Liberated Areas

== Liberated Zone(s) ==
- Liberated Zone (Sierra Leone), former territory of the Revolutionary United Front in Sierra Leone
- Liberated Zones (Guinea-Bissau), former territory of the PAIGC
- Communist-controlled China (1927–1949), also known as the Liberated Zone

== See also ==
- Free Zone (region)
- Free area (disambiguation)
- Free territory (disambiguation)
- Free zone (disambiguation)
