= FZS =

FZS may refer to:

- Fellow of the Zoological Society of London
- Fort Zumwalt South High School, in Missouri, United States
- Frankfurt Zoological Society, in Germany

== See also ==
- FZ (disambiguation)
