= Dubai International Airport Cargo Gateway =

UAE air cargo management facility

Dubai International Airport Cargo Gateway, formerly Dubai Cargo Village, is an air cargo management facility located adjacent to the Dubai International Airport in Al Garhoud, Dubai, UAE. It is owned by the Dubai Airports Company. A similar facility is under construction at the Al Maktoum International Airport in Jebel Ali, 40 kilometres away from the present airport.

DCG is considered one of the most technologically advanced cargo-handling facilities. In January 2008, DCG completed construction on a "Mega Cargo Terminal" capable of handling an additional 1.2 million tonnes per year. In 2008, DCG handled 1.8 million tons of cargo, and 25,279 cargo aircraft, and ACI ranks DCG as the world's 8th busiest air cargo terminal.

DCG is the Middle East’s first cargo handling facility to be awarded an ISO 9002 certificate by Lloyd's Register of Quality Assurance in 1998.

Over 30 airlines have offices in DCV, while the main airport is host to 124 airlines and provides flights to over 207 destinations, in addition, DCG provides direct flights to 20 European cities, 60 cities in the Middle East, Asia, and Africa and has parking for 17 aircraft.

== Location ==
Dubai International Airport Cargo Gateway is strategically located adjacent to Dubai International Airport, in the United Arab Emirates. DCG is roughly 40 km from the adjacent Jebel Ali, where Dubai Airports Company is building Al Maktoum International Airport and Al Maktoum Airport Cargo Gateway.

== History ==
When Dubai Cargo gateway was built in 1991, it was designed to handle 150,000 tonnes of cargo per year. The 300,000-square-metre complex was built at a cost of $75 million (about Dh 275.5 million) to accommodate air and sea freight growth and facilitate transshipment operations between the Indian sub-continent, South East Asia, the Far East and Europe. Within a few years, the facility became too small to accommodate rising demand.

As Dubai rapidly transformed itself into one of the world's key re-export hubs, DCGs terminals and sea-air cargo centre recorded consistent double-digit growth and the facilities expanded to meet demands. Dubai Airport is currently the world's fastest expanding airport.

== Expansion ==
Within only a few years of Dubai Cargo gateway's founding, cargo activity at the Village outgrew available capacity, and the need arose to accommodate rapidly increasing demand. This demand resulted from several factors combined: Dubai's phenomenal growth, the determined expansion of the Emirates airline, increased popularity of air cargo transportation, and the UAE's central position on the world map.

To meet the need for cargo space, the Department of Civil Aviation embarked on a multi-phase US$200 million expansion program set to increase DCG's freight handling capacity with a new Mega Cargo Terminal. The Mega Cargo Terminal, completed in 2008, features a designated function and state-of-the-art equipment for each level. The final phase will increase DCG's cargo handling capacity to 2.7 million tonnes per year (a sharp increase from DCG's initial annual handling capacity of 150,000 tonnes of cargo in 1991).

The Mega Cargo Terminal features an express mail centre, new facilities for administrative and agents’ offices, a multi-storey car park, elevated roadway, a new central utility plant, a mosque, and other amenities. The Mega Cargo Terminal attempts to consolidate Dubai Cargo gateway's position as a pivotal facility for cargo movement in the region and secure Dubai's position as one of the world's leading cargo destinations.

== Equipment & Handling Facilities ==
Total Handling Capacity	About 1,800,000 tonnes/year
Main building	350,000 tonnes/year
Mega Cargo Terminal	1,200,000 tonnes/year
Temporary Facility	100,000 tonnes/year dedicated to EK Skycargo operations
EK Skycargo warehouse	350,000 tonnes/year
Cargo building (Main)	Ground area 24,985 sq.m.
Handling area	8,300 sq.m.
Storage capacity (Main)	7420 tonnes/day

== Operations ==
Dubai Cargo Village's main warehouses are located within a bonded area, and have the capacity for 308 ULDs, as well as racks for small, medium, and large warehouse pallets. There are 56 truck docks for import, export and perishable cargo, and 7 additional docks solely for sea-air traffic.

Dnata is the handling operator of Dubai's air cargo terminals.

Dubai Cargo Village is located in a Free Trade Zone to reduce customs and administrative delays.
