= FZ =

FZ, F-Z, Fz, or fz may refer to:

== Arts and entertainment ==
- Fold Zandura, an American alternative rock band
- Forzando, in music, forcingly, with strong emphasis, like an accent
- Frank Zappa, an American composer, musician, and film director
- F-Zero, a futuristic racing video game by Nintendo

== Science and technology ==
- FileZilla, an FTP client and FTP server
- Float-zone silicon, very pure silicon obtained by vertical zone melting
- Fracture zone, in geology

== Other uses ==
- Farhan Zaman, a short form of his name
- Flydubai (IATA airline designator)
- Forges de Zeebrugge, an arms manufacturer in Belgium
- Franc zone, a currency area in Africa
- Frankfurter Zeitung, a German newspaper
- Free Zone (disambiguation)
- Friend zone, a platonic relationship (texting slang)
- Fuzhou, the capital of Fujian province in China
- Fz: an EEG electrode site according to the 10-20 system
