= Dubai Civil Aviation Authority =

Coordinates: 25°13′58″N 55°21′20″E

- هيئة دبي للطيران المدني
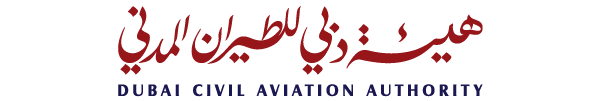

Agency overview
- Jurisdiction: Emirate of Dubai
- Headquarters: Al Garhoud, Dubai
- Agency executives: Ahmed bin Saeed Al Maktoum, President; Mohammed Abdulla Lengawi, Director General
- Website: dcaa.gov.ae

Dubai Civil Aviation Authority (DCAA, Arabic: هيئة دبي للطيران المدني) is the entity responsible for regulating civil aviation affairs in the Emirate of Dubai, United Arab Emirates.

The agency regulates the civil aviation sector of the emirate, establishes frameworks, and ensures compliance and oversight to aviation security and safety. It is also the responsible authority for issuing permits for commercial activities related to civil aviation. It is part of the UAE's General Civil Aviation Authority.

== History ==
DCAA was established as an autonomous body by Law No. (21) of 2007 and its functions and powers were reorganized by Law No. (11) of 2020 Concerning Dubai Civil Aviation Authority.

The DCAA was once the operator of Dubai International Airport, Dubai Cargo Village and Dubai Duty Free Zone. Management of Dubai's airports and cargo gateways have been transferred to Dubai Airports Company, a separate entity from the Department of Civil Aviation. With this restructuring, the scope of the Department of Civil Aviation's activities have been narrowed to aviation regulations and permissions.
