= Dnata =

Subsidiary of Emirates Group

dnata
- Type: State-owned, Private
- Industry: Ground Handling Industry
- Founded: 1959; 67 years ago Dubai
- Founder
- Headquarters: Emirates Group Headquarters, Al Garhoud, Dubai, United Arab Emirates
- Area served: 84 countries
- Key people: Sheikh Ahmed bin Saeed Al Maktoum (Chairman); Nabil Sultan (Chief Executive Officer)
- Products: Aviation Services
- Owner: Investment Corporation of Dubai
- Parent: The Emirates Group
- Website: http://dnata.com

Dubai National Air Travel Agency (Arabic: دناتا) (commonly known as dnata) is an Emirati airport services provider which provides aircraft ground handling, cargo, travel, and flight catering services across five continents.

== History ==
The company dnata was established 1959 in Dubai with five employees. The name originates as an acronym for Dubai National Air Travel Agency. The company has grown significantly with the first international expansion seen in 1993.

In 2008, the company acquired a 23 percent share in the travel company Hogg Robinson Group (HRG) and a 49 percent share of the global outsource provider Mind Pearl.

In 2010, dnata acquired Alpha Flight Limited, expanding the company to cover 62 airports in 12 countries. The next year, the company opened offices in India, offering air travel, hotel, and visa services for travellers between India and Dubai.

In 2015, dnata acquired RM Ground Services in Brazil. The acquisition allowed dnata to provide international airports with outsourced aircraft ground handling, cargo transport, and airline meal catering.

In February 2018, dnata co-founded the Airline Catering Association, which is based in Brussels, Belgium.

== Controversy ==
In 2019, a dnata employee and others were arrested while they were taking drugs off a plane at Sydney Airport. AFP and Border Force officers swooped and arrested them.

In 2021, six dnata baggage handlers and other people were arrested after they planned to bring drugs into Sydney Airport.

== Ground handling ==
In 2018 the company dnata employed over 41,000 people who provided services for 129 airports in 84 countries on six continents. The customer base of dnata consisted of more than 300 airlines and annual revenue amounted to USD 3.6 billion.

- Germany: Cologne
- Australia: Adelaide, Darwin, Melbourne, Brisbane, Perth, and Sydney (formerly a joint venture with Toll Holdings)
- Belgium: Brussels
- Brazil: Aracaju, Belém, Brasília, Boa Vista, Campina Grande, Curitiba, Florianópolis, Fortaleza, Ilhéus, Juazeiro do Norte, Joao Pessoa, Manaus, Macapá, Maceió, Natal, Petrolina, Porto Alegre, Porto Seguro, Recife, Rio de Janeiro, São Luis, Salvador, Santarém, São Paulo-Campinas, São Paulo-Guarulhos and Teresina
- Canada: Toronto (joint venture with GTA: dnata GTA)
- China: Guangzhou and Xi'an
- Czech Republic: Prague
- Ireland: Dublin
- Italy: Milan Linate, Milan Malpensa (joint venture with Airport Handling), Trapani
- Iraq: Erbil
- The Netherlands: Amsterdam
- Pakistan: Karachi, Islamabad, Peshawar, Lahore, Faisalabad, Multan, and Quetta (joint venture with Gerrys: Gerrys dnata)
- Philippines: Manila, Clark and Cebu
- Romania: Bucharest
- Singapore: Singapore Changi
- South Sudan: Juba
- Switzerland: Geneva and Zurich
- United Kingdom: London Heathrow, Manchester, Gatwick, Edinburgh, Birmingham, Glasgow, East Midlands and Newcastle
- United States: Atlanta, Austin, Boston, Chicago O'Hare, Dallas/Ft. Worth, Detroit, El Paso, Grand Rapids, Houston, Indianapolis, Laredo, Los Angeles, Lubbock, McAllen, Milwaukee, Newark, New York, Orlando, Philadelphia, Raleigh/Durham, San Diego, San Francisco, Sanford, Tampa, Washington Dulles and Wichita

== IT services ==
Mercator has been the information technology arm of dnata providing technology and services to the aviation industry worldwide. In 2014 Warburg Pincus, a private equity firm, acquired the majority stake of Mercator and merged it with Accelya in 2017. The combined company operating under the Accelya brand has 2,800 employees and serves 400 clients worldwide.

== Cargo ==
Functioning as the cargo handling operator for the Dubai International Airport Cargo Gateway, cargo services are provided both regionally and internationally at their overseas airports, handling over 3 million tons of cargo annually. In 1991, the online communication portal Calogi was set up for the cargo industry. The first of its kind in the region, the portal allowed airlines, shippers, freight forwarders, and ground handling agents to conduct business anywhere in the world.

== Travel ==
dnata Travel provides assistance in the areas of corporate and government travel, luxury holidays, events, groups and incentives, retail and marine travel. There are 202 locations across the GCC with operational presence in Afghanistan, Bahrain, Oman, Qatar, Kuwait and the Kingdom of Saudi Arabia. dnata Travel is also the regional managing partner for the Hogg Robinson Group in the Middle East and West Asia.

In the United Kingdom dnata Travel owns and operates a number of travel brands these include the Gold Medal Travel Group which includes Pure Luxury, Cruise Plus and Incredible Journey's these brands operate in the business-to-business market selling through travel agencies across the UK. Selling directly to consumers dnata Travel own and operate the Travelbag, Travel Republic and Netflights brands.

== Flight catering ==
Through the acquisition of Alpha Flight Limited in 2010, dnata operates an international flight catering service across 62 airports and 12 countries. With an annual turnover of £360 million STG (AED2.3 billion) in 2010, the company serves 120,000 meals on a daily basis.

== Travel Republic ==
Travel Republic
- Industry: Travel
- Founded: 2003; 23 years ago
- Founder: Chris Waite; Paul Furner; Peter Furner; Kane Pirie
- Headquarters: Kingston upon Thames, UK
- Area served: United Kingdom
- Products: Holidays; Flights; Hotels
- Services: Travel Agency
- Owner: The Emirates Group, DNATA
- Website: www.travelrepublic.co.uk

Travel Republic Limited is an online travel agency founded in the United Kingdom and launched in 2003. Travel Republic is owned by the air services provider, dnata World Travel, which is a part of the Emirates Group.

=== History ===
Travel Republic was founded in 2003 by university students Chris Waite, Paul Furner, Kane Pirie and travel agent Peter Furner. They desired to create a website where customers could book accommodation, flights, car transfers and airport parking in one place. The company specialises in enabling users to build their own holiday experience by combining different elements from the Travel Republic site.

Travel Republic is a travel search website acting as an agent only. The company is a member of ABTA and holds an ATOL License.

In January 2007, the company moved to its current headquarters in Kingston upon Thames, Surrey. In the same year the company had an annual sales growth of 284.2% and topped the charts of The Sunday Times Virgin Atlantic Fast Track 100.

In December 2011 the company was bought by Dnata World Travel which is a subsidiary of the Emirates Group, based in Dubai.

In December 2015 Travel Republic launched a cruise service in partnership with Imagine Cruising.

In July 2018 Dnata appointed Frank Rejwan (formerly of Abercrombie & Kent, Quintessentially and Ickenham Travel Group) as Managing Director for Travel Republic.

=== Operations and technology ===
In January 2012, Travel Republic first introduced its mobile website, before expanding into mobile app on IOS in 2014. In 2015 the Android version of the app was launched.

The company aired its first YouTube ad on 17 January 2011. Their first television campaign 'The Last Click' aired in June 2014. With its success, Travel Republic continued to launch TV advertising campaigns. 'Welcome to the Travel Republic' was launched in January 2016 before the latest campaign aired in December 2016 across UK and Ireland. The campaign highlighted Travel Republic's slogan, 'Yours for the making'.

=== Controversy ===
In a case brought by the Civil Aviation Authority (CAA), Travel Republic was accused of breaching ATOL regulations by selling unlicensed package holidays. Judge Nicholas Evans delivered the not-guilty verdict at Westminster Magistrates' Court on 10 November 2009. In his judgement, Evans said the prosecution had failed to prove that Travel Republic did anything other than "sell components of holidays separately, but at the same time".

=== Sale to Destinia ===
On 20 January 2026, the Travel Republic brand was sold by dnata Travel Group to the Spanish online travel agency Destinia Travel Group. The acquisition formed part of Destinia’s strategy to expand into the UK travel market and included both the Travel Republic and Netflights consumer brands.

The sale followed a strategic review by dnata, which had announced plans to wind down the two UK-based brands. Destinia stated that it intended to continue operating Travel Republic under its existing brand identity, integrating it into Destinia’s technology and operational platform while maintaining continuity for customers. The acquisition provided Destinia with an established presence in the UK online travel sector as part of its wider international expansion strategy.
