= Dubai Airports Company =

UAE based airport authority

- Type: Private
- Headquarters: Dubai
- Key people: HH Sheikh Ahmed bin Saeed Al Maktoum (Chairman); Paul Griffiths (CEO)
- Website: www.dubaiairports.ae

Dubai Airports Company is the airport authority that owns and manages airports in Dubai, including the Al Maktoum International Airport and the Dubai International Airport.

== History ==
Dubai Airports Company was structured in 2008 to take control of Al Maktoum International Airport at Dubai World Central in Jebel Ali, Dubai International Airport, and Dubai Cargo Village.

In 2016, Dubai Airports started working on the expansion of the Al Maktoum International Airport, from 66,107 to 145,926 sq metres.

In 2017, Dubai Airports started implementing two 3,600 square metres modular data center facilities that bring data availability up to 99.82% (only 95 minutes of maximum annual downtime). This investment is part of the Dubai Plus plan that aims to secure adequate technical solutions to drive the exponential growth of Dubai's airports.

== Activities ==
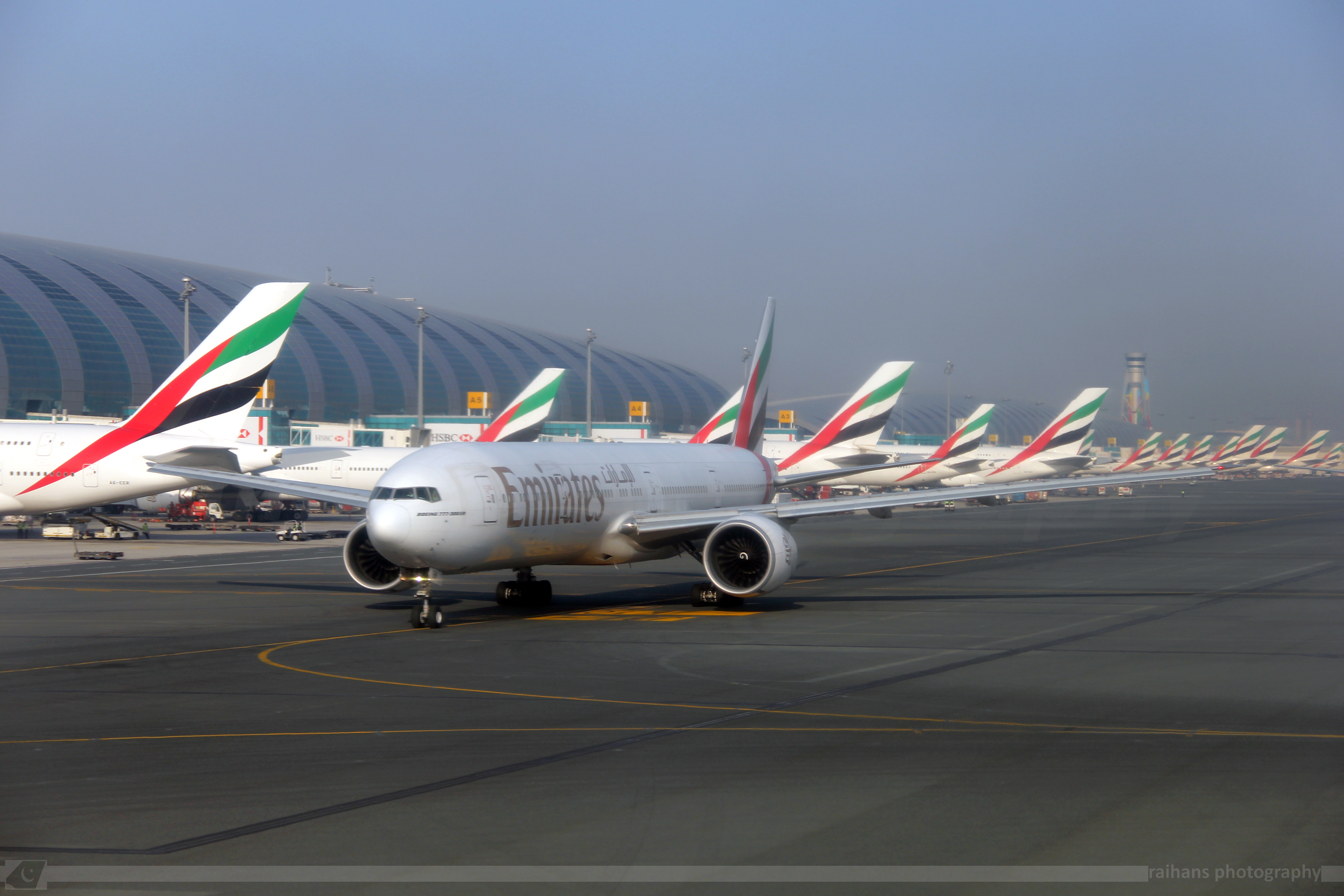
Emirates operations at Dubai International

Incorporated by Dubai Aviation City Corporation, Dubai Airports Company is divided into a number of business units and supporting units. Cargo is one such unit, with others including Finance, HR, Marketing, IT, Engineering and Commercial. Meanwhile, the Department of Civil Aviation (Dubai) will exist as a smaller body in charge of aviation regulations and permissions.

Their "Mega Cargo Terminal" expansion of Dubai Cargo Village renamed those facilities to Dubai International Airport Cargo Gateway in 2008, and increased their capacity to 2.7 million tonnes per year.

Their expansions in Jebel Ali will result in a $75 million Cargo terminal named Al Maktoum Airport Cargo Gateway at Al Maktoum International Airport. By 2013, it is expected to become the largest of its kind in the world, handling more than 12 million tonnes of cargo annually.

Aviation and logistics are an important sector of Dubai's economy. Combined, the airline Emirates and Dubai Airports Company account for 26% of the country's GDP as of 2011. Dubai has an "open skies" policy that allows any airlines to open service there.
