= Al Maktoum Airport Cargo Gateway =

Dubai Airports Company is building a $75 million air freight terminal as an expansion to Al Maktoum International Airport. The new facilities will be named Al Maktoum Airport Cargo Gateway and Al Maktoum International Airport. The initial phase, it is expected to handle 700,000 tonnes of cargo per year and by the scheduled 2013 completion it is expected to become the largest of its kind in the world, handling more than 12 million tonnes of cargo annually.
