= Flydubai =

Airline of the United Arab Emirates

Flydubai فلاي دبي

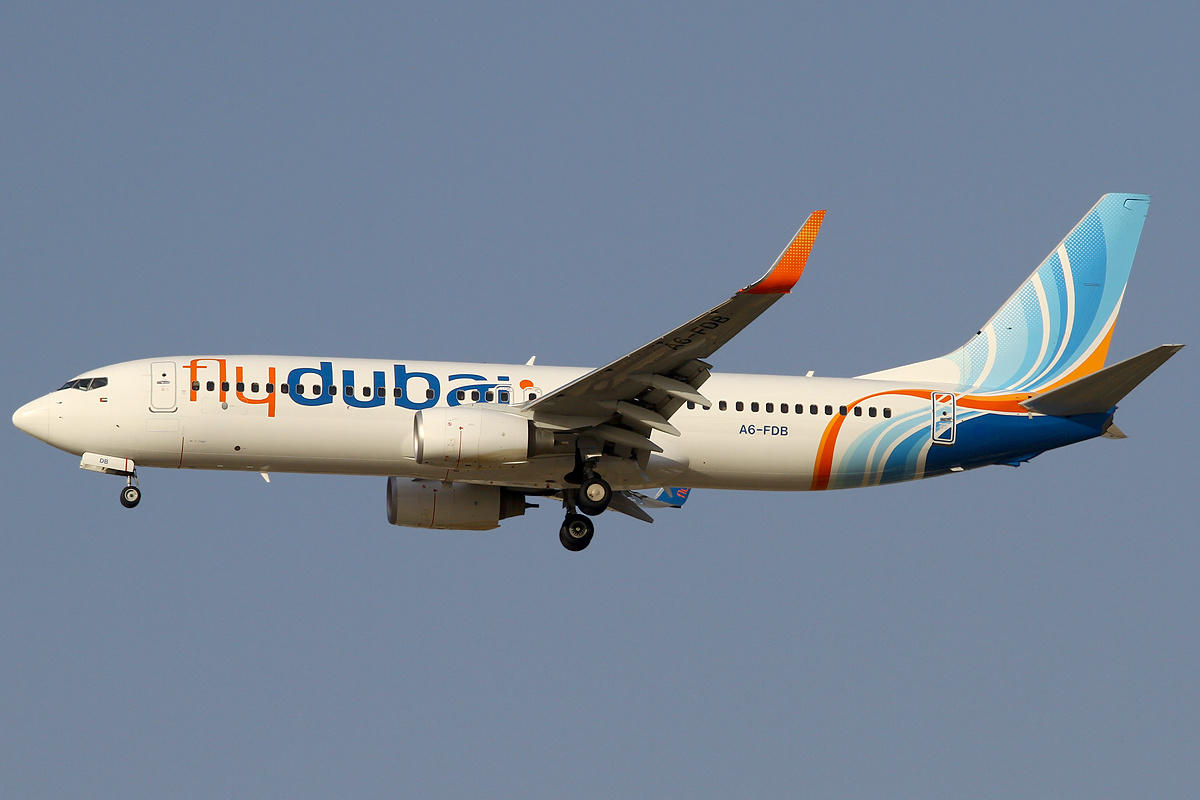
- A Boeing 737-800 of Flydubai
IATA	ICAO	Call sign
FZ	FDB	SKYDUBAI
- Founded: 19 March 2008; 18 years ago
- Commenced operations: 1 June 2009; 17 years ago
- Hubs: Dubai
- Frequent-flyer program: Emirates Skywards
- Fleet size: 88
- Destinations: 131
- Parent company: Investment Corporation of Dubai
- Headquarters: Dubai International Airport, Dubai, United Arab Emirates
- Key people: Ahmed bin Saeed Al Maktoum(chairman); Ghaith Al Ghaith (CEO)
- Revenue: ▲US$3.6 billion (2024)
- Profit: ▲US$611 million (2024)
- Employees: 6,089 (2024)
- Website: flydubai.com

Dubai Aviation Corporation (Arabic: مؤسسة دبي للطيران), doing business as flydubai (Note: stylized as flydubai) (Arabic: فلاي دبي), is an Emirati government-owned airline based in Dubai, United Arab Emirates. The airline operates from Dubai International Airport and serves 131 destinations across the Middle East, Africa, Asia and Europe. The company slogan is "Get Going".

== History ==
=== Foundation and early years ===
In July 2008, the Dubai government established the airline. Although Flydubai is not part of The Emirates Group, Emirates supported Flydubai during the initial establishing phase.

On 14 July 2008, Flydubai signed a firm order with Boeing at the Farnborough Air Show for 50 Boeing 737-800s with a total value of US$3.74 billion. The first of these aircraft was delivered on 17 May 2009. Scheduled flights commenced on 1 June, with services to Beirut, Lebanon, and Amman, Jordan.

=== Development since 2015 ===
In February 2013, Flydubai announced that it was in talks with Boeing and Airbus for a 50-aircraft order. In June 2013, the airline announced that it would be adding business class service to its flights. The business class cabin would feature 12 seats between aisle and window, three-course meals, 12-inch televisions, a business class lounge, Italian leather seats to its offering in a bid to cater to business travellers in the emirate, access to more than 200 films, and power outlets suitable for plugs from over 170 countries.

In March 2019, Flydubai suffered considerable losses due to the grounding of Boeing 737 MAX aircraft around the world. The state-owned company claims that its growth strategy was severely impacted by the incident, as it had 11 of these aircraft and more than 220 on order. Company CEO Ghaith Al-Ghaith said that an interim settlement agreement was made with Boeing for certain compensation but details of the agreement remain confidential.

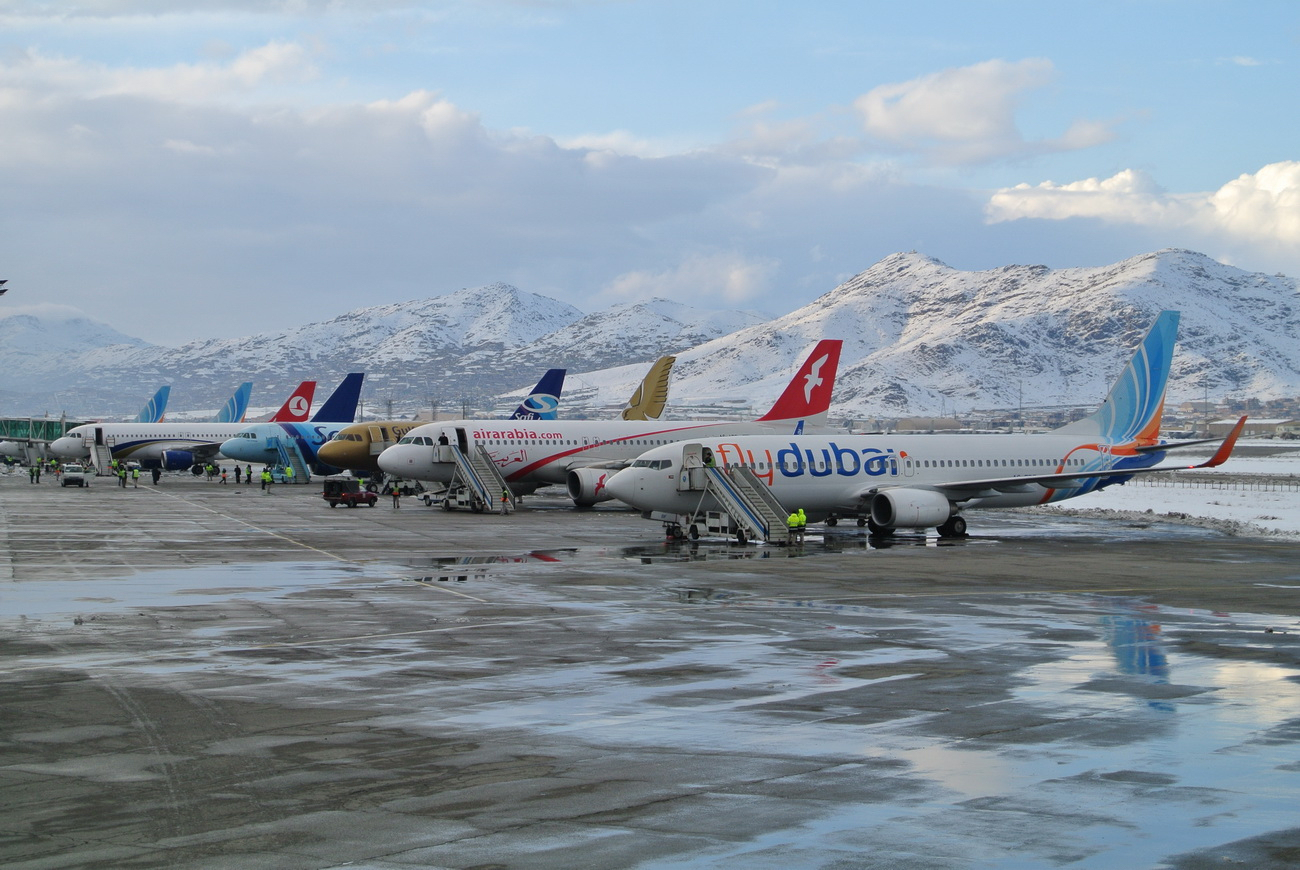
Flydubai and other airlines' aircraft at Kabul International Airport

In November 2020, Flydubai announced that it would start direct flights between Tel Aviv and Dubai, with tickets being offered on sale. This would mark the first commercial flight route between Dubai and Tel Aviv. During the Gaza war, many airlines interrupted their flights to Tel Aviv Airport; but Flydubai and Etihad Airways kept up multiple flights daily, helping Israel remain connected to the wider world. This was a symbol of "UAE's commitment" to maintaining strong ties with Israel.

== Corporate affairs ==
=== Business trends ===
The key trends for Flydubai are shown below (as at year ending 31 December):

	Turnover (AED bn)	Profits (AED m)	Number of passengers (m)	Number of employees	Number of aircraft (Note: at year end)	Notes/ sources
2012	2.7	151	5.1		28	
2013	3.7	222	6.8		36	
2014	4.4	250	7.2		43	
2015	4.9	100	9.0		50	
2016	5.0	31.6	10.4		57	
2017	5.5	37.3	10.9		61	
2018	6.2	–159	11.0	4,080	64	
2019	6.0	198	9.6	3,922	59	
2020	2.8	–712	3.2	3,796	51	
2021	5.3	841	5.6	3,682	59	
2022	9.1	1,200	10.6	4,654	74	
2023	11.2	2,100	13.8	5,545	84	
2024	12.8	2,500	15.4	6,089	88	

Reports released on May 2, 2021, revealed that Flydubai incurred losses of US$194 million in 2020. The airline faced one of the toughest years in the aviation sector as revenues plunged by more than 50% to reach US$773 million in 2020. In June 2020, the airline had reduced salaries of its employees and also put some on unpaid leaves for a year.

=== Management and ownership ===
The company was formed in 2008 as a venture by the Government of Dubai. Even though the airline did get some help from its sister airline initially, it has been run independently since. Also, there was an initial move of executives, but the major bulk of the hiring comes from outside the Emirates Group. The CEO of the company in 2010 was Ghaith Al-Ghaith, who spent over 22 years with Emirates.

=== Flight operations ===
Flydubai operates entirely out of Dubai and currently has its operations building near Terminal 2 at Dubai International Airport in addition to some flights departing from Terminal 3. Initially, Flydubai had intentions to operate from the new Al-Maktoum International Airport in the Dubai World Centre in Jebel Ali.

=== Offices ===
The corporate headquarters is in Terminal 2 at Dubai International Airport. Flydubai sets up its first 'Indian Development Centre' (IDC) in Hyderabad. The centre leads Flydubai's IT and technology innovation which will focus on Passenger service systems (PSS). IDC will be a hub for software development, research and operations.

== Destinations ==
As of April 2024, Flydubai serves more than 110 destinations. The airline currently has one hub and operates out of Terminal 2 of Dubai International Airport (DXB). However, to accommodate for the growing airline and the expansion of the national airline at DXB, Flydubai began to operate flights out of Al Maktoum International Airport (DWC) from 25 October 2015. The airline began with 70 flights per week to Amman, Beirut, Chittagong, Doha, Kathmandu, Kuwait and Muscat from DWC. In December 2018, it also commenced flights from Terminal 3 at Dubai International Airport to select destinations to facilitate transfers with its codeshare partner Emirates.

=== Codeshare agreements ===
Flydubai codeshares with the following airlines:

- Air Canada
- Emirates
- United Airlines

=== Interline agreements ===
Flydubai has interline agreements with the following airlines:

- Aegean Airlines
- APG Airlines
- Air Algerie
- Air Astana
- Air China
- Air France
- Air Serbia
- Alaska Airlines
- Azerbaijan Airlines
- Batik Air Malaysia
- Cathay Pacific
- China Eastern Airlines
- China Southern Airlines
- Condor
- Croatia Airlines
- Delta Air Lines
- Emirates
- Ethiopian Airlines
- Gulf Air
- ITA Airways
- JetBlue
- Kenya Airways
- KLM
- Korean Air
- LOT Polish Airlines
- Pakistan International Airlines
- Philippine Airlines
- Precision Air
- Qantas
- Royal Brunei Airlines
- Rwandair
- Saudia
- S7 Airlines
- Singapore Airlines
- SriLankan Airlines
- TAROM
- United Airlines
- UT Air
- Virgin Atlantic

== Fleet ==
=== Current fleet ===
As of July 2026, Flydubai operates an all-Boeing 737 fleet consisting of the following aircraft:

Flydubai fleet
Aircraft	In service	Orders	Passengers			Notes
Aircraft	In service	Orders	J	Y	Total	Notes
Boeing 737-800	26	—	10	156	166	
Boeing 737-800	26	—	—	189	189	
Boeing 737 MAX 8	69	113	10	156	166	Orders across entire 737 MAX family.
Boeing 737 MAX 8	69	113	12	162	174	Orders across entire 737 MAX family.
Boeing 737 MAX 9	3	113	16	156	172	Orders across entire 737 MAX family.
Boeing 787-9	—	30	TBA			Deliveries begin November 2026.
Total	98	143				

=== Order history ===
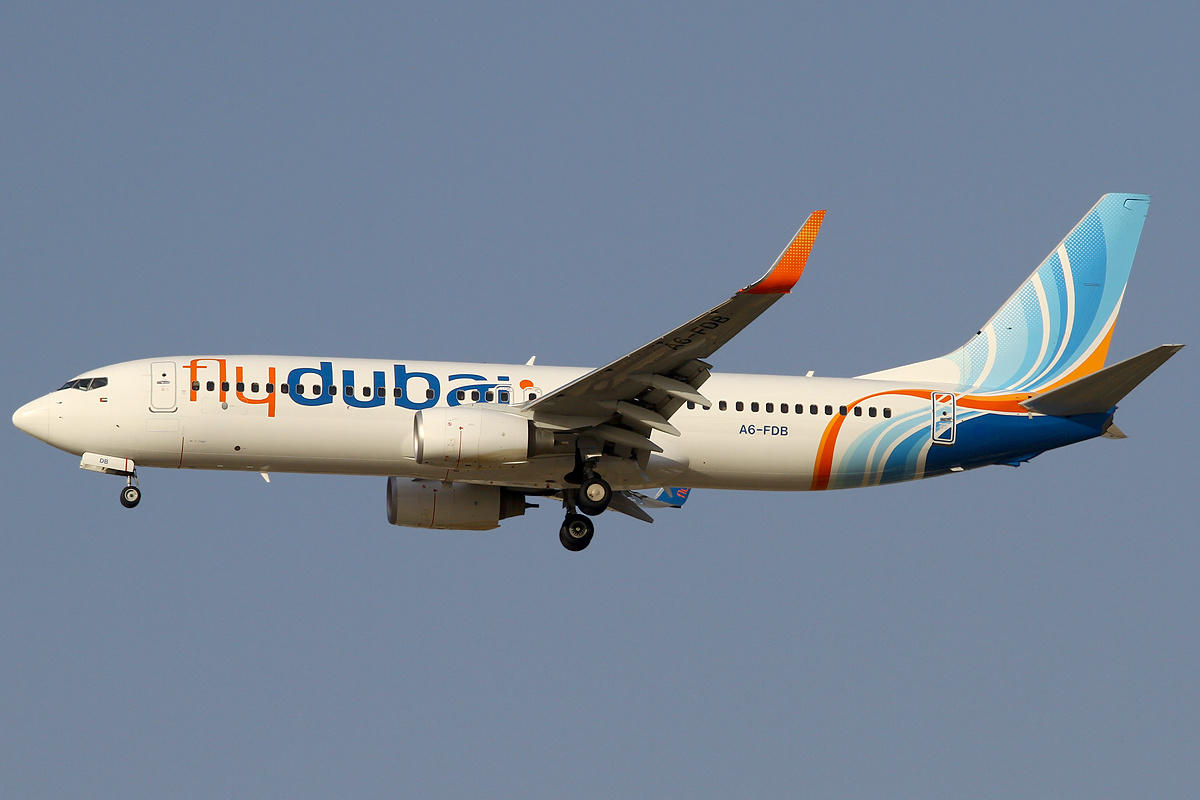
A Flydubai Boeing 737-800

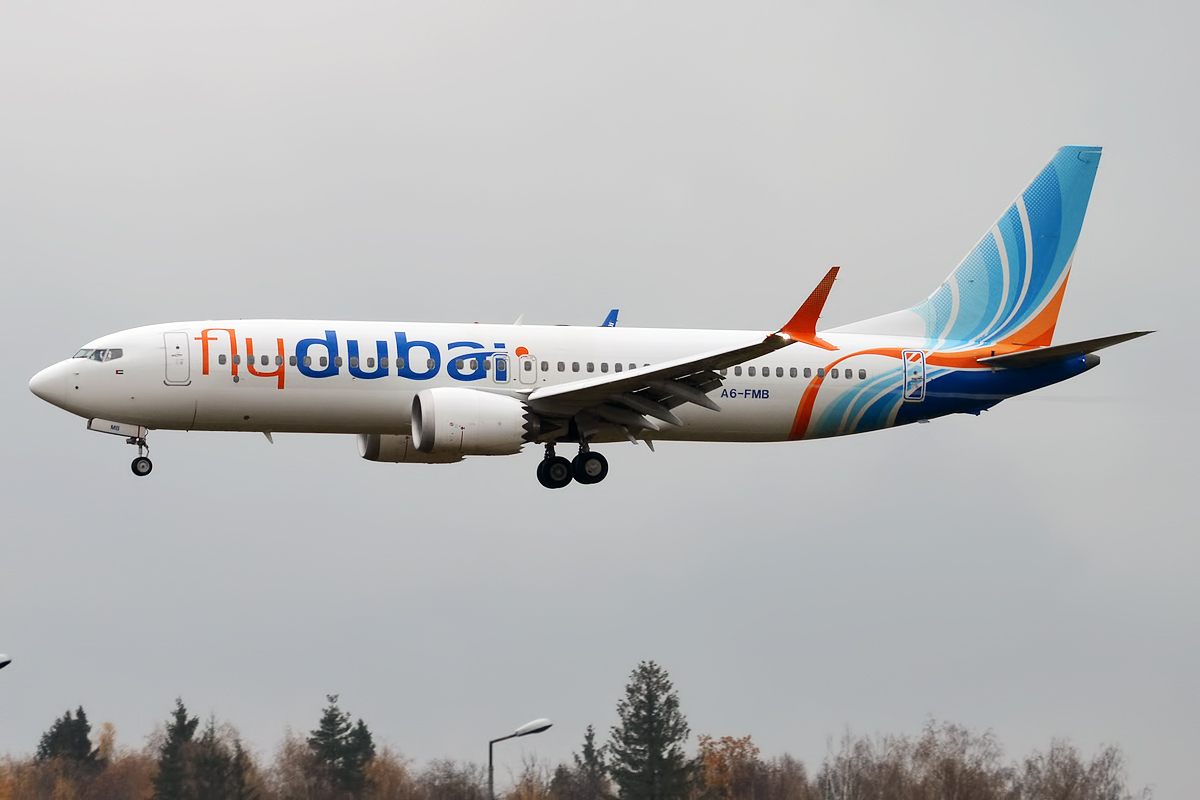
A Flydubai Boeing 737 MAX 8

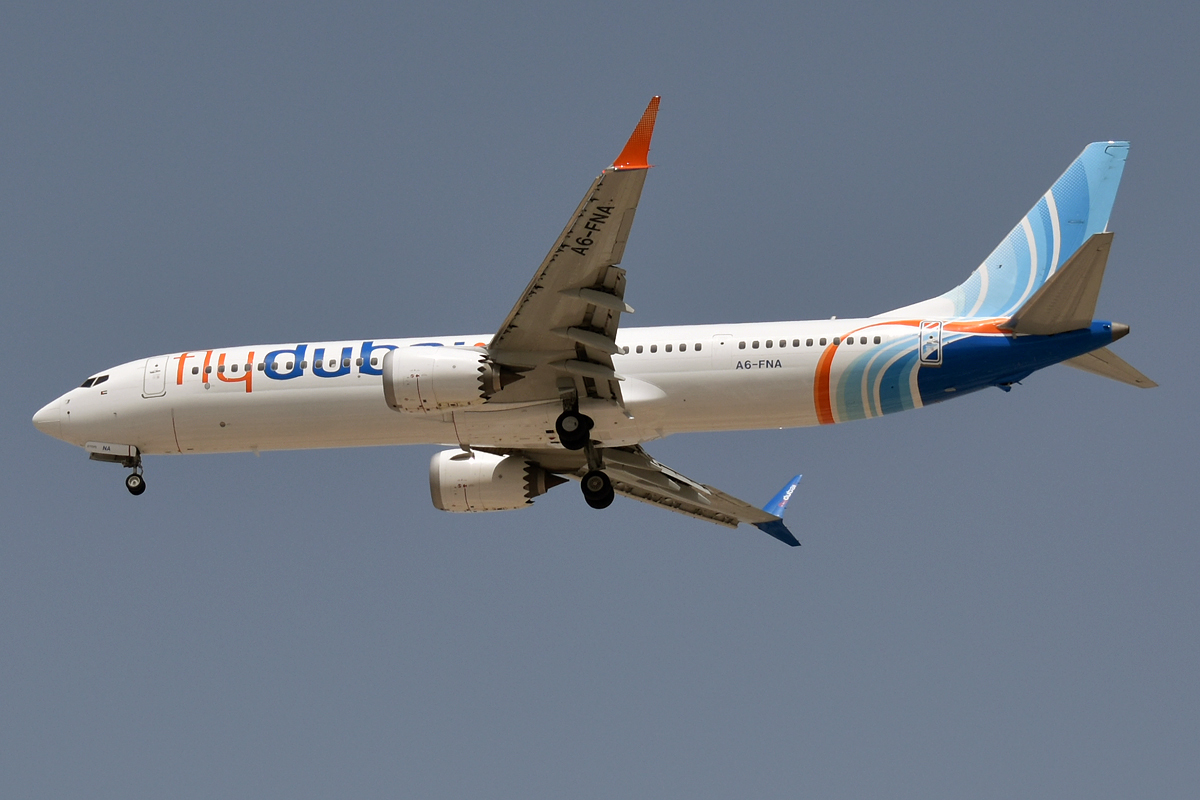
A Flydubai Boeing 737 MAX 9

Boeing 737-800

At the Farnborough Air Show in July 2008, the airline ordered 50 Boeing 737-800s valued at approximately US$3.74 billion with conversion rights to the larger 737-900ERs (extended range). In November 2010, Flydubai agreed a sale and leaseback deal with Avolon on another four 737-800s.

Boeing 737 MAX

On 17 November 2013 at the Dubai Airshow, Boeing and Flydubai announced a commitment for about 100 Boeing 737 MAX 8s and 11 Boeing 737-800 Next Generation aircraft. This commitment was valued at about US$11.4 billion at list prices, making it the largest ever Boeing single-aisle airliner purchase in the Middle East. On 6 January 2014, Flydubai finalised its Boeing 737 order for 75 Boeing 737 MAX 8s and 11 Boeing 737-800 Next Generation aircraft, along with purchase rights for 25 more Boeing 737 MAX aircraft. This order is valued at US$8.8 billion at list prices. On 31 July 2017, Flydubai took delivery of its first Boeing 737 MAX 8, making it the first airline in the Middle East to operate the type. At the November 2017 Dubai Air Show, Flydubai signed a landmark commitment for 175 Boeing 737 MAX aircraft and 50 purchase rights. This order for 225 aircraft is valued to be $27 billion at current list prices. More than 50 of the first 175 airplanes will be the new 737 MAX 10, while the rest will be the 737 MAX 9 and additional 737 MAX 8s. This historic commitment represents the largest single-aisle jet purchase by a Middle East airline. On 21 December 2017, Flydubai finalized its purchase of 175 Boeing 737 MAX airplanes in the largest single-aisle jet order in Middle East history first announced at the 2017 Dubai Air Show.

Boeing 787 Dreamliner

On 13 November 2023, at the Dubai Airshow, Flydubai signed an $11 billion order of 30 787-9 Dreamliners, marking the first time in its history the airline will operate widebodies. The Dreamliners are set to arrive in 2026, accompanying Flydubai's existing fleet of 80 737s and over 130 more that are on order. Some potential destinations for this order include the UK and Australia, as said by Flydubai.

Airbus A321neo

In November 2025, Flydubai announced a provisional order with Airbus for 150 A321neo aircraft that worth $24 billion, with an option for a further 100 aircraft. Deliveries are expected to begin in 2031 until the last delivery in 2043.

== Accidents and incidents ==
- On 26 January 2015, Flydubai Flight 215, a Boeing 737-8KN registered as A6-FEK flying from Dubai to Baghdad, was hit by small arms fire on approach to Baghdad International Airport with 154 passengers on board. The aircraft landed safely and no medical attention was needed at the airport.
- On 19 March 2016, Flydubai Flight 981, a Boeing 737-8KN registered as A6-FDN flying from Dubai to Rostov-on-Don in Russia, crashed during a go-around in inclement weather at Rostov-on-Don Airport, killing all 55 passengers and 7 crew on board. It was the first fatal accident in the airline's history. Investigation conducted by the Interstate Aviation Committee ruled that the 2016 accident was the result of pilot error.
- On 30 September 2026, Flydubai Flight 1073, a Boeing 737 MAX 8 registered A6-FKF operating from Dubai to Tel Aviv, descended over 14,000 ft (4,300 m) in less than 30 seconds after the first officer attacked the captain and attempted to crash the aircraft. After passengers overpowered the first officer and stopped the aircraft's dive, secondary flight crew assumed control of the aircraft and made an emergency landing at Tabuk, Saudi Arabia. The aircraft sustained damage to the rudder. The captain underwent surgery for injuries sustained in the attack, while the first officer was arrested for attempted hijacking and terrorism.
