= Ahmed bin Saeed Al Maktoum =

Emirati businessman and politician (born 1958)

Sheikh Ahmed bin Saeed Al Maktoum
- أحمد بن سعيد آل مكتوم
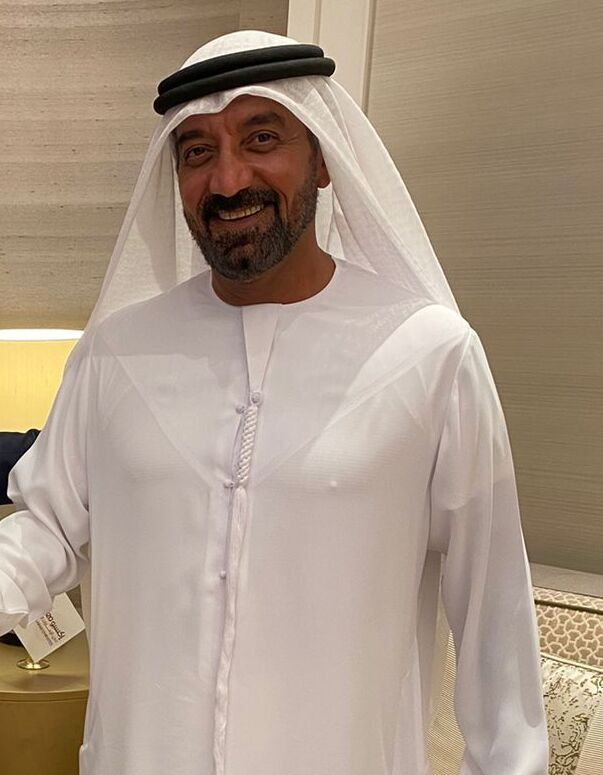
- Sheikh Ahmed in 2021
- Born: 1 December 1958 (age 67); Dubai, Trucial States
- Education: University of Denver
- Occupations: Chairman and CEO Emirates Airline, Dubai Aviation City Corporation, Dubai World, flydubai, Noor Islamic Bank, Dubai Duty Free, Emirates NBD Bank PJSC, Chancellor of The British University in Dubai
- Issue: Saeed bin Ahmed Al Maktoum; Mohammed bin Ahmed Al Maktoum
- House: Al Maktoum
- Father: Saeed bin Maktoum bin Hasher Al Maktoum
- Mother: Fatima bint Ahmed bin Suliman

Sheikh Ahmed bin Saeed Al Maktoum (Arabic: أحمد بن سعيد آل مكتوم; born 1 December 1958) is an Emirati businessman, politician and member of Dubai's ruling Al Maktoum family, who was the chairman and CEO of the Emirates airline and the Emirates Group, second vice chairman of the Executive Council of Dubai and president of the Dubai Civil Aviation Authority (DCAA).

He was also the chairman of Dubai Airports, Dubai Holding, Dubai World and Emirates NBD. Ahmed was the board member of the Investment Corporation of Dubai (ICD) and the current chancellor of The British University in Dubai.

== Early life and education ==
Born on 1 December 1958, Ahmed is the youngest son of Dubai's former ruler, Sheikh Saeed bin Maktoum bin Hasher Al Maktoum, and the only child of his father's second wife, Sheikha Fatima bint Ahmed bin Suliman.

He is the half-brother of the former ruler of Dubai, Sheikh Rashid bin Saeed Al Maktoum, and is the uncle of Dubai's current ruler, Sheikh Mohammed bin Rashid Al Maktoum.

Ahmed has a degree in political science from the University of Denver.

== Career ==
Al Maktoum's career in the aviation industry began in 1985 when he was appointed president of the Dubai Department of Civil Aviation (DCA) (the governing body which oversaw the activities of Dubai International and Dubai Duty Free). Emirates, the national carrier, was launched at the same time, with Al Maktoum appointed chairman.

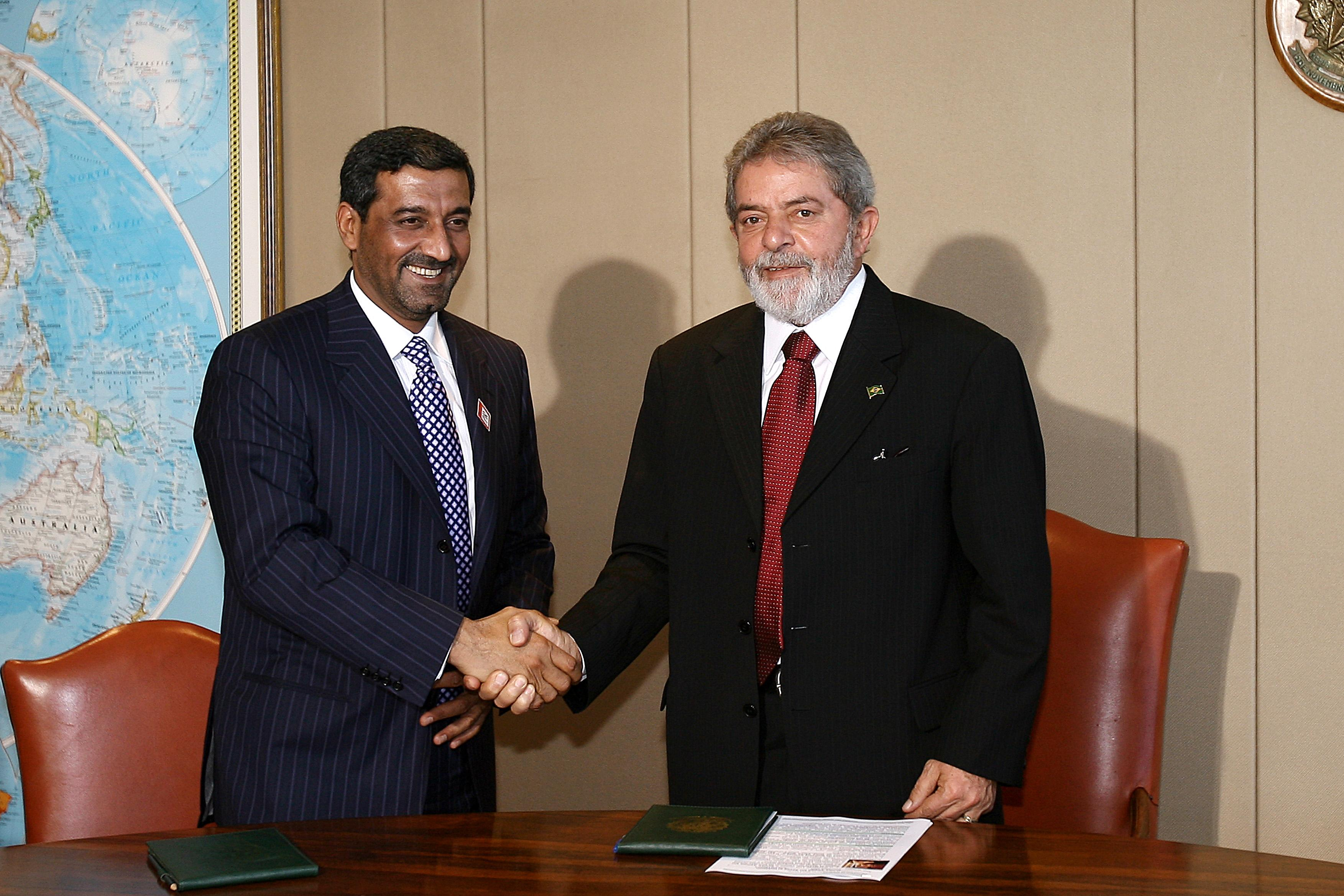
Al Maktoum with Lula da Silva, president of Brazil.

He is believed to be connected to at least 14 board members in 14 organizations in 14 industries. Al Maktoum has been called "the man who put Dubai on the global aviation map." He has been chairman and CEO of Emirates Airline & Group since 1985. In October 2019 Al Maktoum, as president of Dubai Civil Aviation Authority (DCAA), opened a quartet of sector-specific global food trade platforms at the Dubai World Trade Centre (DWTC).

Al Maktoum was chairman of the Dubai Free Zone Council. At its 13th meeting in 2019, chaired by Al Maktoum, the members discussed initiatives and proposals for long-term rental agreements or investors and free zone passports. Al Maktoum is chair of the Emirates Airline Festival of Literature.

== Personal life ==
He married Egyptian socialite Nivin El-Gamal in 2007 in an Islamic ceremony in a London flat. Al Maktoum denied that this had taken place; a London court accepted that it had, but that it was not a valid marriage under English law. She gave birth to their only child, Saeed bin Ahmed bin Saeed Al Maktoum. Al Maktoum later married Sheikha Mona, a first cousin twice removed, a descendent of Sheikh Obaid bin Thani Al Maktoum, in 2008.

He married Moza bint Hamdan Al Malik Al Shehi in 2019, and they had a son named Mohammed in November 2020.

== Honors and awards ==
- 2007: Living Legend of Aviation — Aviation Entrepreneur of the Year.
- 2011: Ernst & Young Entrepreneur of the Year Award for the UAE
- 2012: Emirates Airline Festival of Literature Personality of the Year Award.
- 2013: Honorary degree from City University London.
- 2013: Honorary Knight Commander of The Most Excellent Order of the British Empire.
- Listed in the Top 100 most powerful Arabs' from 2013 to 2021 by Gulf Business.
