= Free territory =

Free territory may refer to:

- Free Catalan Territory, a group of municipalities that support the independence of Catalonia
- Free Territory of Trieste, a territory with a special status around and including Trieste bordering Italy and Yugoslavia, 1947–1954
- Free Territory of Freedomland, a micronation that covered the Spratly Islands in the South China Sea, 1956–1974
- Free area of the Republic of China, territories under the control of the Republic of China, commonly known as Taiwan, c. 1937–present
- Free territories in the War of National Liberation, the liberated territories of Yugoslavia during World War II, 1941–1945

== See also ==
- Free Zone (disambiguation)
- Unorganized territory (disambiguation)
