= Free zone =

Free zone may refer to:

== Places and areas ==
- Free Zone (region), a part of Western Sahara that is controlled by the partially-recognised Sahrawi Republic
- Zone libre ('free zone'), a partition of the French metropolitan territory during World War II
- Italian partisan republics (free zones), provisional states established by Italian partisans.
- Special economic zone
  - Free economic zone, or free zone, or free port
  - Free-trade zone

== Other uses ==
- Free Zone (film), 2005 film
- Free Zone (Scientology), independent groups and individuals who practice Scientology beliefs

== See also ==
- Free Territory (disambiguation)
- Azad Kashmir ('free Kashmir')
- Free area of the Republic of China
- "Free Xone", a song on Janet Jackson from the 1997 album The Velvet Rope
- No symbol
