= Dubai South =

City under construction in Dubai, UAE

Dubai South (formerly known as Dubai World Central) is a city that was under construction in Dubai, United Arab Emirates in 2006, planned to be an economic zone to support a number of activities including logistics, aviation, commercial, exhibition, humanitarian, residential and other related businesses around Al Maktoum International Airport with the planned annual capacity of 12 million tonnes of cargo and 160 million passengers. The construction area is two times the size of Hong Kong Island.

The development was planned to comprise the following sub-development projects:

- Dubai World Central Residential City: Aimed at providing housing solutions within the economic zone.
- Dubai World Central Logistics City: Focused on enhancing Dubai's capacity as a global logistics hub.
- Dubai World Central Enterprise Park: Designed to support businesses with state-of-the-art infrastructure.
- Dubai World Central Commercial City: A business hub that accommodates companies from various sectors.
- Dubai World Central Aviation City: Dedicated to reinforcing Dubai's status in the global aviation industry.
- Dubai World Central Industry City: Supports manufacturing and industrial projects.
- Dubai World Central - Al Maktoum International Airport: The centerpiece of Dubai South, planned to be the world's largest airport.
- Dubai World Central Staff Village: Provides accommodation for the workforce in Dubai South.
- Dubai World Central Golf City: Offers leisure and recreational facilities to residents and visitors.

== History ==
Dubai World Central was renamed Dubai South in 2015. At the time the development covered 145 square kilometres (56 sq mi) and included Al Maktoum International Airport and the site of Expo 2020.

In April 2024 the Dubai government approved designs for a new passenger terminal at Al Maktoum International Airport, and construction began at a cost of Dh128 billion ($34.8 billion). The airport is planned to handle up to 260 million passengers a year and to take over all operations of Dubai International Airport within ten years. Mohammed bin Rashid Al Maktoum, the ruler of Dubai, said that a city was being built around the airport in Dubai South and that demand for housing for a million people would follow.
