= Al Maktoum International Airport =

Airport serving Dubai, United Arab Emirates

Al Maktoum International Airport مطار آل مكتوم الدولي

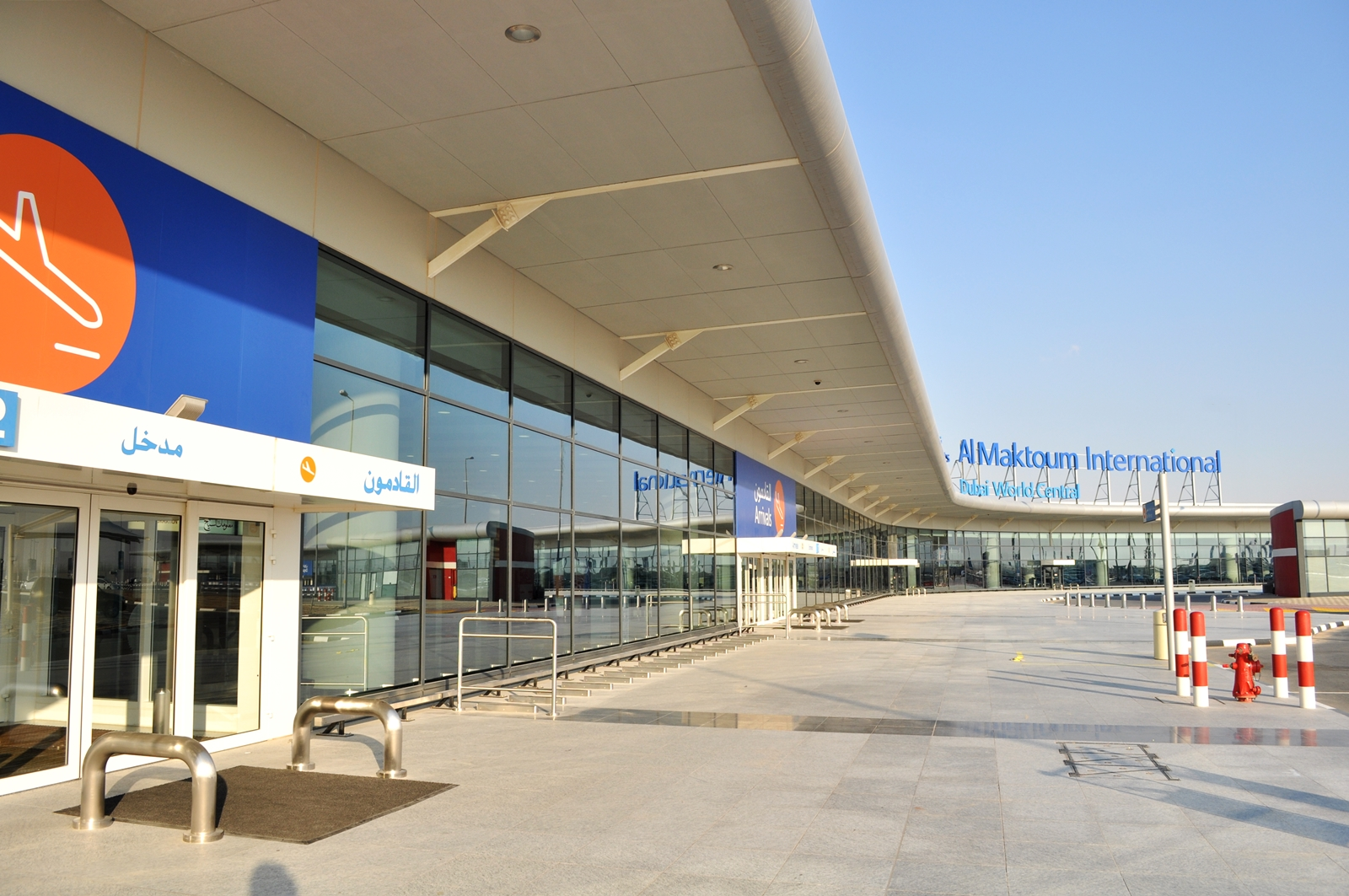
- IATA: DWC; ICAO: OMDW

Summary
- Airport type: Public
- Owner/Operator: Dubai Airports Company
- Serves: Dubai
- Location: Jebel Ali, Dubai, United Arab Emirates
- Opened: 27 June 2010; 16 years ago
- Hub for: Emirates SkyCargo
- Time zone: UAE Standard Time (UTC+04:00)
- Elevation AMSL: 170 ft (52 m)
- Coordinates: 24°53′17.80″N 55°9′37.36″E
- Website: dubaiairports.ae
- Interactive map of Al Maktoum International Airport

Runways
Direction	Length		Surface
Direction	m	ft	Surface
12/30	4,500	14,764	Asphalt
13/31	1,838	6,030	Asphalt
- Sourceː UAE AIP

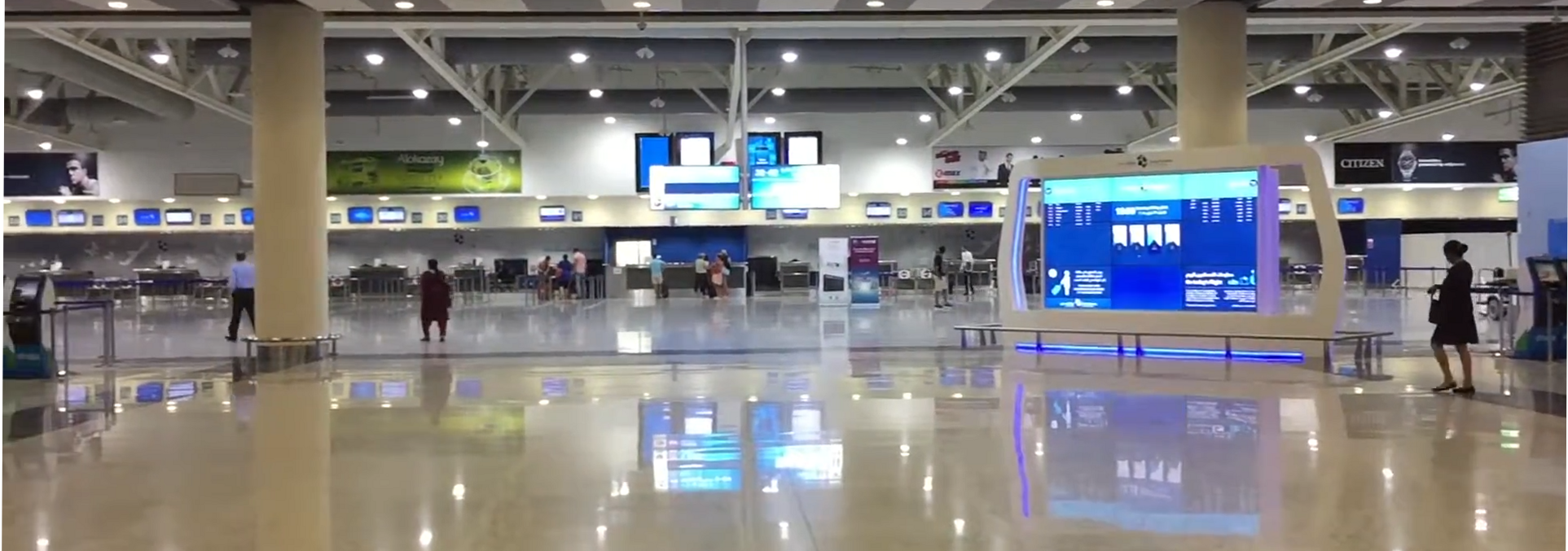
Al Maktoum International Airport in 2016

Al Maktoum International Airport (IATA: DWC, ICAO: OMDW), also known as Dubai World Central, is an international airport in Jebel Ali, Dubai, United Arab Emirates, that opened on 27 June 2010. Located 37 kilometres (23 mi) southwest of the city of Dubai, it is the main part of Dubai South, a planned residential, commercial and logistics complex.

When fully completed (not before 2035), the airport will contain transport modes, logistics, and value-added services, including manufacturing and assembly, in a single free economic zone. It will cover an area of 14,400 hectares (36,000 acres). The airport has a projected annual capacity of 12 million tonnes (26 billion pounds) of freight and between 160 million and 260 million passengers. As of 2021, only a handful of airlines operated passenger services out of Al Maktoum International Airport with a focus on freight activity.

Emirates plans to use the airport as its only hub once the first expansion is complete, with Dubai International Airport to be closed down once Al Maktoum International Airport expansion is completed.

== History ==
=== Construction ===
The 4,500 m × 60 m (14,800 ft × 200 ft) runway was completed in 2007 after 600 days of construction with tests planned over the following six to eight months in order to fulfill its CAT III-C requirements. Construction of the airport's cargo terminal, the Al Maktoum Airport Cargo Gateway, which cost around US$75 million, was 50% complete by the end of 2008.

During the first phase of the project, the airport was planned to handle around 200,000 tonnes (440 million pounds) of cargo per year, with the possibility of increasing to 800,000 tonnes (1.8 billion pounds). The passenger terminal at this phase was designed to have a capacity of 5 million passengers per year. It was planned to be the largest airport in the world in terms of freight handled, moving up to 12 million tonnes (26 billion pounds) per year in 2013. It is expected to handle 150 million passengers by 2032.

The project was originally expected to be fully operational by 2017, although the 2008 financial crisis subsequently postponed the completion of the complex to 2027. Previous working names for the airport complex have included Jebel Ali International Airport, Jebel Ali Airport City, and Dubai World Central International Airport. The airport was eventually named the Al Maktoum International Airport after the House of Maktoum which rules the Emirate of Dubai. The total cost of the airport has been estimated by the Dubai government to be US$82 billion.

=== Operations ===
Al Maktoum International Airport opened on 24 June 2010 with one runway and only cargo flights. The first flight into the airport occurred on 20 June 2010, when an Emirates SkyCargo Boeing 777F landed after a flight from Hong Kong. The flight served as a test for various functions such as air traffic control, movement of aircraft on the ground, and security. According to Emirates, the flight was an "unmitigated success".

On 24 February 2011, the airport was certified to handle passenger aircraft with up to 60 passengers. The first passenger aircraft touched down on 28 February 2011, an Airbus A319CJ. The airport officially opened for passenger flights on 26 October 2013 with Flynas and Wizz Air as the two carriers to operate from the airport.

In the first quarter of 2014, 102,000 passengers went through the airport. At the time of its opening, three cargo service airlines served Al Maktoum International Airport, including RUS Aviation, Skyline Air and Aerospace Consortium. Fifteen additional airlines then signed a contract to operate flights to the airport.

Passenger numbers in the first half of 2016 totaled 410,278, up from 209,989 in the first half of 2015. Low usage of the facility led to it being described as a white elephant.

== Expansion plans ==
Expansion plans for Al Maktoum International Airport with its 5 runways and 4 concourses as announced in April 2024.

On 28 April 2024, Emirates announced that the ruler of Dubai, Sheikh Mohammed bin Rashid al-Maktoum, had approved a major expansion of Al Maktoum International Airport with the construction of a new 128 billion AED (US$34.85 billion) passenger terminal. When complete, the airport is expected to be the largest in the world at roughly five times the size of the existing Dubai International Airport with capacity for up to 260 million passengers. Plans call for the airport to include five parallel runways and 400 aircraft gates. All Emirates and Flydubai operations are expected to be transferred to the new airport once completed.

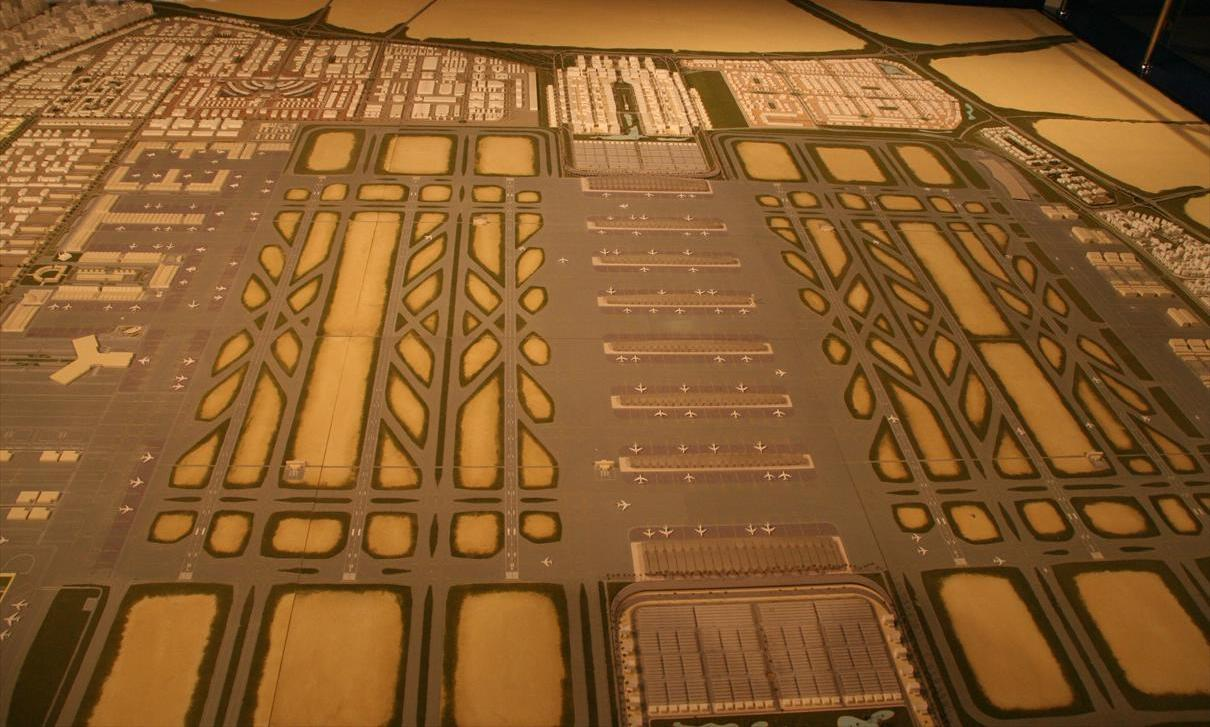
Old model of the planned expansion, as of 2006

== Airlines and destinations ==
=== Passenger ===
The following airlines offer regular scheduled and charter services to and from Al Maktoum International:

Airlines	Destinations
Animawings	Timișoara; Seasonal: Bucharest–Otopeni (all flights suspended)
azimuth	Krasnodar, Mineralnye Vody, Sochi
BeOnd	Malé, Munich, Zurich
Berniq Airways	Benghazi
Enter Air	Seasonal: Katowice, Poznań, Warsaw–Chopin
Flyadeal	Riyadh
Fly Cham	Aleppo
FlyOne	Seasonal: Chișinău
Flynas	Abha
Luxair	Seasonal: Luxembourg
Pobeda	Kazan, Makhachkala, Moscow–Vnukovo, Ufa, Vladikavkaz, Yekaterinburg
Red Wings Airlines	Sochi
Rossiya Airlines	Saint Petersburg, Sochi
Smartwings	Prague
Ural Airlines	Seasonal: Moscow–Domodedovo, Sochi, Yekaterinburg
Utair	Grozny, Moscow–Vnukovo, Surgut, Tyumen, Ufa
Varesh Airlines	Sari
Yemenia	Aden, Mukalla

=== Cargo ===
Airlines	Destinations
Aerotranscargo	Fujairah, Hanoi, Hong Kong, Riyadh, Zhengzhou
Afcom Cargo	Navi Mumbai
Astral Aviation	Aktobe, Hong Kong, Johannesburg–O. R. Tambo, Nairobi–Jomo Kenyatta
Atlas Air	Delhi
China Airlines Cargo	Amsterdam, Bangkok–Suvarnabhumi, Frankfurt, Hanoi, Luxembourg, Prague, Taipei–Taoyuan
Emirates SkyCargo	Addis Ababa, Ahmedabad, Algiers, Amsterdam, Auckland, Barcelona, Bangkok–Suvarnabhumi, Bengaluru, Bogotá, Brussels, Cairo, Chicago–O'Hare, Copenhagen, Dakar–Yoff, Dammam, Dhaka, Djibouti, Entebbe, Frankfurt, Guangzhou, Hanoi, Ho Chi Minh City, Hong Kong, Houston–Intercontinental, Jakarta–Soekarno-Hatta, Johannesburg–O.R. Tambo, Lagos, Liège, Lilongwe, London–Heathrow, London–Stansted, Maastricht/Aachen, Madrid, Mexico City, Milan–Malpensa, Mumbai, Nairobi–Jomo Kenyatta, New York–JFK, Ouagadougou, Phnom Penh, Quito, Riyadh, Shanghai–Pudong, Singapore, Sydney, Taipei–Taoyuan, Tokyo–Narita, Zaragoza
KLM Cargo	Amsterdam, Hong Kong
FedEx Express	Memphis
My Freighter	Tashkent
SolitAir	Sofia
Turkish Cargo	Hyderabad, Istanbul
Turkmenistan Airlines Cargo	Ashgabat

== See also ==
- Dubai International Airport
- Sharjah International Airport
