= Dorris =

Dorris may refer to:

- Dorris (surname)
- Dorris Haron Kasco (born 1966), Ivorian photographer
- Dorris, California, a city in Siskiyou County
- Dorris Motors Corporation, a car manufacturer that ended production in 1926

== See also ==
- Doris (disambiguation)
