= Tounkara =

Tounkara is a surname. Notable people with the surname include:

- Balla Tounkara, Malian musician
- Djelimady Tounkara, Malian musician
- Fodé Tounkara (1985–1999), Guinean stowaway
- Ibrahim Tounkara (born 1976), Canadian football player
- Maakan Tounkara (born 1983), French handball player
- Mamadou Tounkara (born 1996), Spanish footballer
- Oumare Tounkara (born 1990), French footballer
- Ousmane Tounkara (born 1973), Canadian football player
