= Wheel-well stowaway =

People who attempt travel in the wheel wells of commercial passenger planes

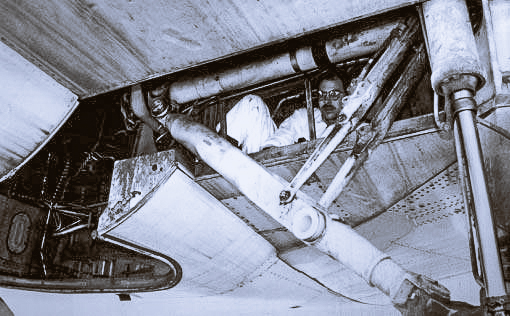
DC-8 wheel-well stowaway space re-enactment by FAA CAMI researcher

Wheel-well stowaways are individuals who attempt to covertly travel in the landing gear compartment – also known as the wheel well, wheel bay, or undercarriage – of an aircraft. Between 1947 and June 2015, a U.S. Federal Aviation Administration (FAA) researcher had documented 113 such attempts on 101 flights. These 113 people were all male and predominantly under age 30. There were 86 deaths, a 76 percent fatality rate, with many unidentified decedents. A further 26 incidents, identified since June 2015, are listed here. There may be additional undocumented cases of wheel-well stowaways.

Wheel-well stowaways face considerable risk of death during all phases of flight. Some have been unable to remain in the well during takeoff and landing and have fallen to their death. Immediately after takeoff, the landing gear retracts into the wheel wells, with the potential to crush the stowaway. If the stowaway is able to avoid physical injury, they still face hypothermia and hypoxia risks at the extremely low temperatures and low atmospheric pressure at high altitude, as well as hearing damage from prolonged exposure to the dangerously high noise levels outside the cabin.

== Aeromedical physiology ==
At altitudes above approximately 2,500 m (8,000 ft), hypothermia becomes a risk and reduced atmospheric pressure and partial pressure of oxygen, which drop below the level required to support brain consciousness at the cruising altitudes of jet aircraft, may impair physiological processes. At altitudes above 6,000 m (20,000 ft), stowaways may also develop decompression sickness and nitrogen gas embolism.

Temperatures continue to decrease with altitude, and may drop as low as −63 °C (−81 °F). As the plane descends to lower altitudes, a gradual rewarming and reoxygenation occur. If the stowaway has already died, or else does not regain consciousness and mobility by the time the landing gear is lowered during the final approach; the body may fall from the aircraft. According to the FAA, it is likely that the number of stowaways is higher than records show because bodies have fallen into the ocean or in remote areas. Many wheel-well stowaways are found, dead or alive, with their bodies covered in frost, suggesting severe hypothermia during flight. Fidel Maruhi, who survived a wheel-well flight from Tahiti to Los Angeles in 2000, had a body temperature of 26 °C (79 °F), well below the level usually considered fatal, when emergency personnel began treating him on the runway.

It is unknown how survivors did not perish from such extreme conditions. A 1996 FAA paper proposed that humans, when placed in an environment that overwhelms the body's ability to control its own temperature, become poikilothermic and enter a state of hibernation that allows the body to temporarily survive in low-oxygen environments. Among 99 known cases of wheel-well stowaways from 1947 through June 6, 2013, there were 76 fatalities and 23 survivors. It is possible there are additional undocumented cases of successful surviving wheel-well stowaways escaping the aircraft undetected possibly with outside assistance.

One survivor, Armando Socarras Ramirez, who defected from Cuba aboard an Iberia flight from Havana to Madrid in 1969, recalled in 2021 that his earliest post-flight memories are of Spanish doctors calling him "Mr. Popsicle" because ice covered his body when the pilot discovered him after his arrival. He had boarded the plane while it was taxiing, carrying a flashlight, rope, and wool to stuff his ears; a companion fell out of the other wheel well before takeoff and a third backed out at the last moment. After takeoff, he had suffered frostbite on his middle finger so severe it turned black holding on until the wheels retracted, but then remembered nothing save shivering and shaking from the extreme cold until he lost consciousness. It took him a month in a Spanish hospital to regain his hearing, but he reports no lingering medical issues from the experience.

== Keith Sapsford ==
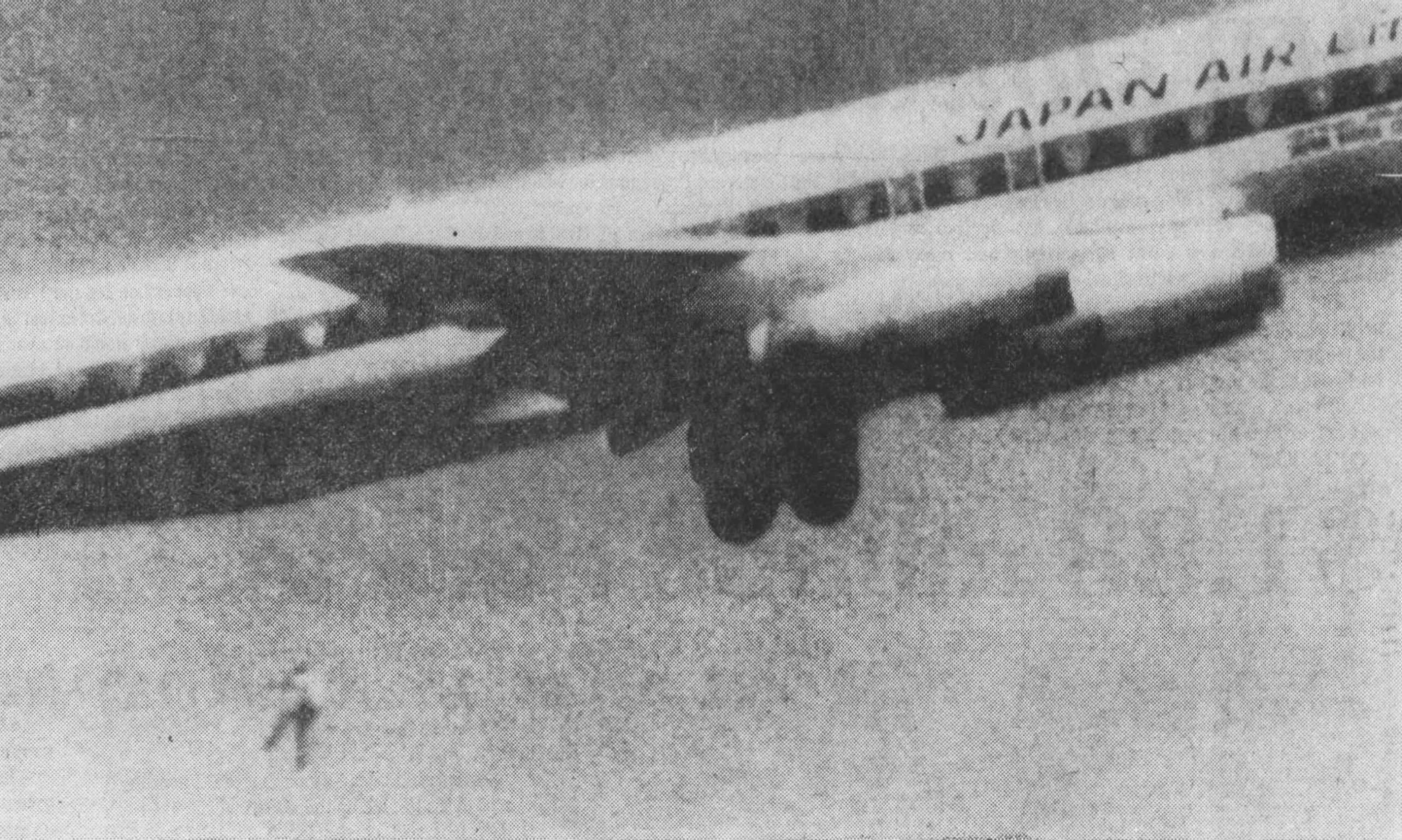
The image of Keith Sapsford falling to his death captured on February 22, 1970

Keith Sapsford was born on 14 January 1956 in Randwick, New South Wales, Australia. When he was 3 years old, he wandered away from home as he had done several times before, resulting in a 6-hour search. As a teen, he reportedly wanted to explore the world. His parents took him on an overseas trip, but when they came back home he still wasn’t satisfied. He ran away, but when his dad caught him, he was sent to a boarding school to “straighten him out”. He subsequently escaped the school and headed to Sydney Airport and found a Japan Airlines Douglas DC-8-62 plane that was heading to Manila, Hong Kong and Tokyo.

He entered the wheel well and sat on the wheel compartment doors, not knowing that they would open during takeoff to retract the plane's wheels. He fell 200 feet (60 m) to his death. There were approximately 350 people on an observation deck who saw his fall and his body slide on the tarmac. Because of the distance, observers were unsure what they had seen; witnesses said it resembled a sack falling from the plane's undercarriage.

When police found his body, they said his face was “badly marked.” According to them he was wearing a white shirt and blue shorts. A pair of sandals was near his body. His foster father, Charles Sapsford, was devastated, saying, “All my son wanted to do was see the world. He had itchy feet. His determination to see how the rest of the world lives has cost him his life.”

Amateur photographer John Gilpin was testing his new camera lens by taking pictures of planes taking off that day. The photo was then featured in Life magazine's issue for the week of March 6, 1970, in their "Parting Shots" section of particularly newsworthy photos, across the fold of a two-page spread.

== List of wheel-well stowaways ==
Below is a chronological list of documented aircraft wheel-well stowaway incidents. Stowaways have also traveled in a cargo hold, or in a spare parts compartment, both of which are pressurized, or even in the pressurized cabin itself. In at least one other instance, on July 31, 2013, a cat survived a flight from Athens to Zürich in the front undercarriage of an Airbus A321; in July 1950, two kittens survived in the landing gear of a small aircraft on a flight from Greenfield, Indiana to Chicago. Those types of incidents are not included in the scope of the list below.

Date	Stowaway(s)	Flight	Aircraft	Stowaway's fate
Aug 24, 1945	Wen Mon-Ping	Lashio–China		Survived, hand and shoulder severely injured
Aug 7, 1946	Bas Wie, 12	Kupang–Darwin	Douglas DC-3	Survived, naturalised in Australia in 1958 and married
Aug 5, 1947	Francisco Carvalho, 30	Lisbon–Natal	Douglas DC-3	Survived. Returned home to Portugal and was arrested for leaving the country illegally
1948	Cipriano Castano Hidalgo, 19	Madrid–Buenos Aires	Douglas C-54 Skymaster	Died
Jul 12, 1948	Jose da Silva, 18	Lisbon–London	Avro York	Survived, deported to Portugal the following day
Nov 15, 1948	Sayabali (Fiji Indian), 18	Nadi–Honolulu	Douglas DC-4	Survived, arrested, jailed for 60 days and deported back to Fiji
Jul 5, 1952	Harvey Wichman, 20 and Russ La Rose, 19	Los Angeles–Milwaukee	Douglas DC-6	Survived, arrested
Feb 10, 1956	Wanderley de Cunha Camargo, 20	São Paulo–New York	Douglas DC-6	Survived, arrested and deported back to Brazil; legally emigrated to the United States that July
Sep 9, 1960	Daniel Melo, 16	Santa Maria–Bermuda	Lockheed L-1049 Super Constellation	Survived, caught by LAV's ground team and deported.
Sep 28, 1966	Francisco Cuevas Garcia, 17	Bogotá–Mexico City	Boeing 707	Survived at 34,000 feet (10,000 m). Returned home to Querétaro and was pardoned.
Apr 18, 1966	Unidentified man, about 24	Moscow–Paris	Sud Aviation Caravelle	Died
Apr 19, 1966	Unknown youth, 20/21	Paris–Morocco	Sud Aviation Caravelle	Died (frozen)
Jun 4, 1969	Armando Socarras Ramírez, 17, Jorge Pérez Blanco, 16	Havana–Madrid (Iberia Flight 904)	Douglas DC-8	Pérez fell out before takeoff and survived to be imprisoned by the Cuban government. Socarras made it to Madrid, was released after 52 days in a Spanish hospital, and as of 2021 lives in Virginia.
Jul 26, 1969	Male, 17, and a second unknown	Havana–Madrid	Douglas DC-8	One survived, second fell to death
Feb 22, 1970	Keith Sapsford, 14	Sydney–Manila (Japan Airlines flight)	Douglas DC-8	Sapsford fell to his death after the landing gear doors opened underneath him as the gear retracted, falling from 200 feet (61 m) during the take off sequence. His fatal fall was inadvertently captured by amateur photographer John Gilpin and the photograph was published in Life magazine.
Jun 21, 1970	Jean-Pierre Viers, 13	Lyon–Abidjan	Douglas DC-8	Died (fell at Abidjan when landing gear lowered)
Apr 14, 1972	John J. Gribowski, 18	San Diego–New York	Boeing 707	Died (froze)
Mar 23, 1975	Luis Albert Fula Camacho, 18	Bogotá–Miami	Boeing 707	Died (fell)
Nov 14, 1986	Gabriel Pacheco, 35	Panama–Miami	Boeing 707	Survived at 39,000 feet (12,000 m)
Feb 19, 1990	Two men from Trinidad	Trinidad–Toronto (BIWA West Indies flight)	Lockheed L1011	Both survived 5 hour flight
Mar 15, 1993	Shamsul Ramli, 17	Kuala Lumpur–Johannesburg (Malaysia Airlines flight)	Boeing 747	Died. Body found in the 747's wheel well at Johannesburg Airport on arrival.
Jun 4, 1993	Juan Carlos Guzmán-Betancourt, 17	Bogotá–Miami (Arca Airline flight)	Douglas DC-8	Survived at 35,000 feet (11,000 m), but frosted
Aug 4, 1993	Male, 19	Bogotá–New York	Boeing 747	Died
Sep 13, 1994	Male	Nukuʻalofa–Rarotonga (Polynesian Airlines flight)	Boeing 737-300	Died. Body prevented landing gear from extending, requiring a diversion and crash landing in Samoa.
1995	Unknown migrant worker	To Shanghai	Boeing 747	Died (froze and fell during landing at Pudong International Airport)
Aug 2, 1996	Two Mongolian boys, about 9 and 12	Ulaanbaatar–Kadena Air Base (U.S. Air Force flight)	Lockheed C-141B	12-year-old declared dead after discovery. Other child died two days later.
Oct 14, 1996	Pardeep Saini, 22, Vijay Saini, 19	New Delhi–London (British Airways flight)	Boeing 747	Pardeep survived in the nose wheel well at 35,000 feet (11,000 m), Vijay died
Mar 22, 1997	Male, adolescent	Nairobi–London	Boeing 747	Died (crushed in nosewheel well)
1998	Trevor Jacobs, 30	Antigua–Trinidad	McDonnell Douglas MD-80	Died (Trevor Jacobs was wanted on several criminal charges, including kidnapping)
Feb 7, 1998	Unknown male	Baku–London (British Airways Flight 2028)	Boeing 767	Died, body discovered upon arrival at Gatwick Airport on February 8
Jun 28, 1998	Chinese male, 23	Shanghai–Tokyo (Northwest Airlines flight)	Boeing 747	Survived, but hospitalized in critical condition
Sep 14, 1998	Emilio Dominguez, 23	San Pedro Sula–Miami (Iberia Flight 6130)	McDonnell Douglas DC-9	Survived at 33,000 feet (10,000 m), traveled seeking work, but was returned to Honduras
Jul 28, 1999	Yaguine Koita and Fodé Tounkara, both aged 14	Conakry–Brussels (Sabena Flight 520)	Airbus A330	Both died (frozen)
Aug 4, 2000	Fidel Maruhi, 24	Tahiti–Los Angeles (Air France Flight 71)	Boeing 747-400	Survived at 38,000 feet (12,000 m). Discovered during a refueling stopover in Los Angeles, where his body temperature had dropped to 26 °C (79 °F), well below levels usually considered lethal, Maruhi later told, that the main motive behind his travel to France was to "shake hands" with Zinedine Zidane.
Jun 2001	Mohammed Ayaz, 21	Bahrain–London	Boeing 777	Died (traveled to London due to lack of employment in Pakistan and Bahrain)
Aug 7, 2001	Unknown male	London–New York (American Airlines Flight 131)	Boeing 777	Died (fell from 1,500 feet (460 m) on approach to John F. Kennedy International Airport)
Sep 2001	Mikhail Semenyaga, 24	Perm–Yekaterinburg–Frankfurt		Died
Dec 24, 2001	Alberto Rodriguez, 15, Maikel Almira, 16	Havana–London	Boeing 777	Both died (planned on hiding on a flight to Miami)
Jul 2002	Cameroonian male, 34	Rio de Janeiro–Paris (Air France flight)		Died
Dec 2002	Victor Alvarez Molina, 24	Havana–Montreal	McDonnell Douglas DC-10	Survived, received refugee status in Canada
Dec 5, 2002	Two boys, 12 and 14	Accra–London	McDonnell Douglas DC-10	Both died
Jan 11, 2003	Mariano Alexis Herrera-Ba, Punta Cana Airport technician	Punta Cana–Toronto	Airbus A320	Died
Jan 23, 2003	Two unidentified men	Paris–Shanghai (Air France Flight 112)	Boeing 777	Both died (fell on approach to Pudong Airport)
Feb 25, 2003	Unknown male	Mali or Gabon–Paris?		Died (fell near Paris)
Mar 25, 2003	Unknown Russian male, 19	To Frankfurt		Died (was crushed and then fell when approaching Frankfurt)
Dec 24, 2003	Unknown male, about 25	Montego Bay–New York (American Airlines flight)		Died
Dec 30, 2003	Unknown male, 30s	Lagos–London–New York (British Airways Flight 117)	Boeing 747	Died (body found upon arrival at John F. Kennedy International Airport)
Jul 21, 2004	Unknown male, 20	Dominican Republic–Düsseldorf		Died (froze)
Oct 22, 2004	Unknown male, 20s	Miami–Detroit	Boeing 737	Died
Nov 11, 2004	Liang Kailong, 14, Su Qing, 13	Kunming–Chongqing (Sichuan Airlines Flight 8670)	Airbus A320	Liang survived, Su died (fell shortly after takeoff)
Nov 16, 2004	Unknown	Mali–Paris		Died
Nov 30, 2004	Unknown male			Died (fell, body found in Louvain)
May 25, 2005	Unknown boy, about 10	Dunhuang–Lanzhou	Airbus A320	Died (fell soon after takeoff)
Jun 7, 2005	Unidentified	Johannesburg–Dakar–New York (South African Airways Flight 203)	Airbus A340	Died (crushed on approach to John F. Kennedy International Airport)
Jan 12, 2007	Male	Johannesburg–Dakar–Atlanta (Delta Air Lines Flight 35)	Boeing 767	Died (frozen and crushed)
Jan 15, 2007	Unidentified	Banjul–Dakar–Brussels	Airbus A330-300	Died
Jan 28, 2007	Samuel Peter Benjamin, 17	Singapore–Vancouver–Hong Kong–Cape Town–London–Los Angeles	Boeing 747	Died in the front wheel well, presumably after hitching the aircraft in his hometown Cape Town on January 22, body discovered in Los Angeles
Jul 19, 2007	Asian male, 50s	Shanghai–San Francisco (United Airlines flight)	Boeing 747	Died (in the nose gear wheel well)
Sep 21, 2007	Andrey Shcherbakov, 15	Perm–Moscow	Boeing 737	Survived, but suffered severe frostbite
Oct 12, 2007	Osama R.M. Shublaq	Kuala Lumpur–Singapore (Singapore Airlines Flight 119)	Boeing 777-200	Survived
Oct 21, 2007	Ilgar Ashumov, 15	Baku–Moscow		Died on approach to Domodedovo Airport, body found 12 km from the airport
Aug 9, 2009	Filipp Yurchenko, 19	Irkutsk–Khabarovsk–Vladivostok (Vladivostok Air Flight 486)	Airbus A320	Died
Feb 7, 2010	Unknown male	New York–Tokyo (Delta Air Lines Flight 59)	Boeing 777	Died
Feb 18, 2010	Unknown Dominican male	Santo Domingo–Miami (Amerijet flight)	Boeing 767	Died (fell during takeoff)
Mar 2010	Okechukwu Okeke, Nigerian	Lagos–United States (Delta Air Lines flight)	Boeing 777	Died in the nose wheel well
Apr 2010	Unknown African male	To Zurich		Died (fell after landing gear was lowered on approach to Zürich, body found in Weisslingen)
Jun 6, 2010	Romanian male, 20	Vienna–London	Boeing 747	Survived
Jul 9, 2010	Unknown male	Beirut–Riyadh (Nasair flight)	Airbus A320	Died
Sep 10, 2010	Nigerian national	Johannesburg–Lagos (Arik Air flight)		Died (crushed)
Nov 2, 2010	Roman Sorokovikov, 16	Yerbogachen–Kirensk	Antonov An-24	Survived, but planned to reach Irkutsk
Nov 15, 2010	Delvonte Tisdale, 16	Charlotte–Boston (US Airways Flight 1776)	Boeing 737	Died (possible fatal injury inside wheel well from landing gear, fell on approach to Boston)
Jan 15, 2011	Qasim Siddique	Lahore–Dubai (Airblue flight)		Died (fell shortly after takeoff)
Jul 13, 2011	Adonis Guerrero Barrios, 23	Havana–Madrid	Airbus A340	Died
Jul 26, 2012	Unidentified male	Cape Town–London (British Airways flight)	Boeing 747-400	Died
Sep 9, 2012	Jose Matada, 27	Luanda–London	Boeing 777	Died (fell)
Oct 26, 2012	Unidentified male	London–Lagos (Arik Air flight)	Airbus A340-500	Died
Apr 8, 2013	Unidentified male	Yaoundé–Paris (Camair-Co flight)	Boeing 767	Died
Jun 6, 2013	Georgian national, 22 (presumably)	Rimini–Moscow (I-Fly flight)	Airbus A321	Died four days before discovery, and may have been undetected for seven or more previous flights; stowaway boarding location undetermined.
Jul 18, 2013	Hikmet Komur, 32	Istanbul–London (British Airways Flight 675)	Airbus A320	Died (froze), body found upon arrival at Heathrow Airport
Jul 25, 2013	Unknown male	Ouagadougou–Niamey (Air France Flight 547)	Airbus A330	Died (fell during landing in Niamey)
Aug 24, 2013	Daniel Ihekina, 13/14	Benin City–Lagos		Survived
Jan 5, 2014	Unknown	Mashhad–Medina (emergency landing due to landing gear failure)	Boeing 767-300ER	Died (body parts fell at an intersection in Mushrefa, Jeddah)
Feb 22, 2014	Chris Dikeh, Nigerian national	Dakar–Washington, D.C.	Airbus A340-300	Died
Apr 20, 2014	Yahya Abdi, Somali national, 16	San Jose–Kahului (Hawaiian Airlines Flight 45)	Boeing 767	Survived
Jul 5, 2014	Male, 17	Sandefjord–Amsterdam (KLM Cityhopper flight)	Embraer 190	Died
July 27, 2014	Unknown male teenager	Mali (presumably)–Ramstein Air Base	Lockheed Martin C-130J Super Hercules	Died
March 14, 2015	Unidentified male, 40s	Lagos–New York (Arik Air flight)	Airbus A340-500	Died (the body was presumed to be in the wheel well from March 11, 2015, when the aircraft had its last flight from New York)
April 7, 2015	Mario Steven Ambarita, 21	Pekanbaru–Jakarta (Garuda Indonesia Flight 177)	Boeing 737-800	Survived
June 19, 2015	Carlito Vale, Mozambican national, 28/29, and Themba Cabeka, 24	Johannesburg–London (British Airways Flight 54)	Boeing 747-400	Vale died (fell during approach, body recovered from a roof in Richmond). Cabeka survived with life-changing injuries and has been granted leave to remain.
September 12, 2015	Unidentified stowaway	Nairobi–Amsterdam (Emirates SkyCargo flight)	Boeing 777-200	Died, body discovered upon arrival at Schiphol Airport
January 11, 2016	Unidentified male	São Paulo–Paris (Air France flight)	Boeing 777	Died, body discovered during maintenance operations on the Boeing 777 at Orly Airport
February 14, 2016	Unidentified man	Munich–Durban (Western Global Airlines flight)	McDonnell Douglas MD-11	Died, body discovered during refuelling at Harare International Airport, Zimbabwe.
June 7, 2016	Unidentified male	Dakar–Brussels (Brussels Airlines Flight 204)	Airbus A330	Died, body discovered during regular maintenance at Brussels Airport
September 21, 2016	Unidentified African male	Kano–Jeddah (Flynas flight)	Boeing 747	Died, body discovered in the rear wheel well during regular check in Jeddah
November 30, 2016	Unidentified stowaway	Lagos–Johannesburg (Arik Air flight)	Airbus A330-200	Died, body discovered at the O. R. Tambo International Airport
August 12, 2017	Unidentified Dominican male	Santo Domingo–Miami (American Airlines Flight 1026)	Airbus A321	Survived, was returned to Dominican Republic
January 13, 2018	Unidentified male	Honolulu–Tokyo (Delta Air Lines flight)		Died, body fell on take-off.
February 11, 2018	Unidentified African man	Kinshasa–Ukunda (Kenya Airways flight)		Died, found after emergency landing at Jomo Kenyatta International Airport
February 26, 2018	Marco Vinicio P. G., 17, and Luis Manuel Ch. P., 16	Guayaquil–New York (LATAM Flight 1438)	Boeing 767-300	Both died (bodies fell on takeoff)
August 2018	Unidentified male	Caracas–La Fría		Died (fell on takeoff from Simón Bolívar International Airport)
April 13, 2019	Unidentified male	Pointe-à-Pitre–Cayenne (Air France Flight 600)	Airbus A320	Survived. Homeless man found on the tarmac of the Félix Éboué Airport. The flight made a refuelling stop at Martinique Aimé Césaire International Airport in Martinique between Pointe-à-Pitre and Cayenne.
June 30, 2019	Unidentified male, 29	Nairobi–London (Kenya Airways Flight 100)	Boeing 787-8	Died (froze during the flight and fell from the landing gear on approach to Heathrow Airport. The body fell into a garden in Clapham, one meter (3 ft) away from a sunbathing resident). An investigation by Sky News initially identified the man as 29-year old Paul Manyasi, an employee of Colnet, a cleaning company contracted by Kenya Airports Authority. KAA and Colnet both claimed that their records showed that Manyasi was never employed by Colnet, nor did his name appear on any airport staff registers. Later reporting by KTN News Kenya found that the family who claimed to have positively identified Manyasi as their son was not even named Manyasi, had no son named Paul and had been paid US$200 to make the claim. Sky retracted the story and apologized to its readers for having been misled and Colnet for having erroneously reported the man had been an employee.
September 30, 2019	Unidentified male, 20s.	Conakry–Casablanca (Royal Air Maroc Flight 526)	Boeing 737-800	Died. Unknown man in his twenties was found lifeless in plane's landing gear compartment. External examination of the body revealed severe abrasions, particularly on the chest, abdomen and limbs. The body was frozen and rigor mortis had already set in. The cause of death was judged to occur as a result of the combined effect of hypothermia and thoracic trauma.
January 7, 2020	Unidentified male	Abidjan–Paris (Air France Flight 703)	Boeing 777-300	Died (cause unknown; body found in plane's landing gear upon arrival at Charles de Gaulle Airport)
February 4, 2021	Kenyan national, 16	London–Maastricht (Turkish Airlines Flight 6305)	Airbus A330	Survived. Was hospitalized but recovered. The flight reportedly left from Nairobi previously, arriving in London after a stop in Istanbul.
April 19, 2021	Unidentified male	Lagos–Amsterdam (KLM Flight 588)	Airbus A330-200	Died during the flight, likely of hypothermia.
August 16, 2021	Shafiullah Hotak (~25), Fida Mohammad (~20), Zaki Anwari (19)	Kabul airlift	Boeing C-17	Three men were among those who died during the 2021 Kabul Airport evacuation. Several men were seen clinging on to the landing gear, with at least two of them falling from the plane moments after takeoff. The bodies of the fallen men were later recovered from the rooftop of a house in Kabul and were identified as Shafiullah Hotak (~25 years) and Fida Mohammad (~20 years). Zaki Anwari (19) was a third fatality, whose remains were seen trapped in the landing gear, hours after take-off. Anwari was a footballer and had represented Afghanistan's under-23 team.
November 27, 2021	Unidentified male	Guatemala City–Miami (American Airlines Flight 1182)	Boeing 737-800	Survived. The unidentified male was brought into the custody of U.S. Customs and Border Protection and taken to the hospital for medical evaluation.
January 23, 2022	Unidentified male, 22 years old, from Kenya	Johannesburg–Nairobi–Amsterdam (Cargolux Italia Flight 7156)	Boeing 747-400F	Survived. The unidentified male was apprehended by Dutch border control to undergo medical evaluation.
April 17, 2023	Unidentified male, possibly from Nigeria	Lagos–Toronto–Amsterdam (KLM)	Boeing 777	Died on flight, possibly from hypothermia
September 15, 2023	Unidentified male, possibly from The Gambia	Banjul – Several destinations in Europe – Amsterdam – Istanbul (Turkish Airlines)	Airbus A330	Died, possibly got on in The Gambia on September 10. Found on September 15 during routine maintenance in Istanbul.
December 28, 2023	Unidentified male, possibly in his 20s	Oran–Paris (Air Algérie)	Boeing 737	Alive but in critical condition (severe hypothermia)
December 25, 2024	Unidentified person	Chicago–Kahului (United Airlines)	Boeing 787-10	Died; body discovered upon landing.
January 7, 2025	Jeik Aniluz Lusi, 18, Elvis Borques Castillo, 16	New York–Fort Lauderdale (JetBlue)	Airbus A321	Died; bodies discovered in landing gear compartment upon landing.
September 21, 2025	13-year-old resident of Kunduz, Afghanistan	Kabul–Delhi (Kam Air)	Airbus A340	Survived. Sent back to Afghanistan on the same flight.
September 28, 2025	Jose Joaquin De Leon Santiz, 25	Frankfurt or Madrid – Charlotte		Died, body found during maintenance in Charlotte.
