= Emirates SkyCargo =

Cargo airline of the United Arab Emirates; based in Dubai

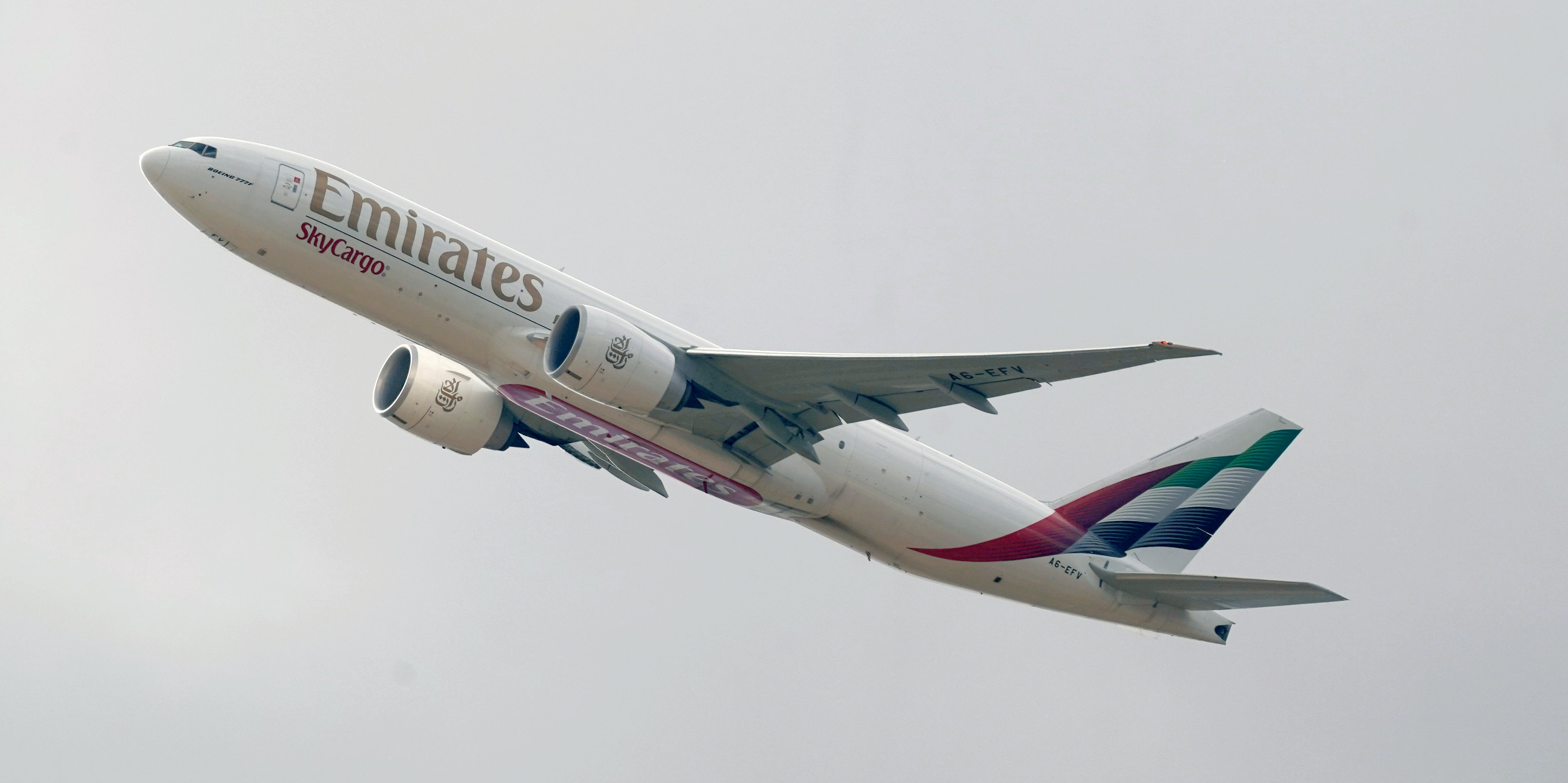
IATA	ICAO	Call sign
EK	UAE	EMIRATES
- Founded: 25 October 1985; 41 years ago
- Hubs: Al Maktoum International Airport
- Fleet size: 27
- Destinations: 87
- Parent company: The Emirates Group
- Headquarters: Dubai, United Arab Emirates
- Key people: Sheikh Ahmed bin Saeed Al Maktoum (Chairman & CEO)
- Website: www.skycargo.com

Emirates SkyCargo (Arabic: الإمارات للشحن الجوي) is a cargo airline based in Dubai, United Arab Emirates. As of 2020, it is the fourth largest cargo airline worldwide in terms of the total freight tonne-kilometres flown and international freight tonne-kilometres flown.

Emirates SkyCargo is the air freight division of Emirates, which started operations in October 1985, the same year Emirates was formed. Since then, it has been the main cargo division of Emirates, and the anchor cargo airline at Al Maktoum International Airport, its main hub. Emirates SkyCargo operates dedicated cargo flights to 26 destinations from Al Maktoum International Airport, and through the Emirates passenger network, it has access to additional 61 destinations. Whilst using belly hold capacity in the Emirates' passenger fleet, it also operates freighter aircraft. Emirates SkyCargo is a subsidiary of The Emirates Group which has over 100,000 employees. Furthermore, it is wholly owned by the Government of Dubai directly under the Investment Corporation of Dubai. The company slogan is, "Delivering the highest standards of product quality".

== History ==
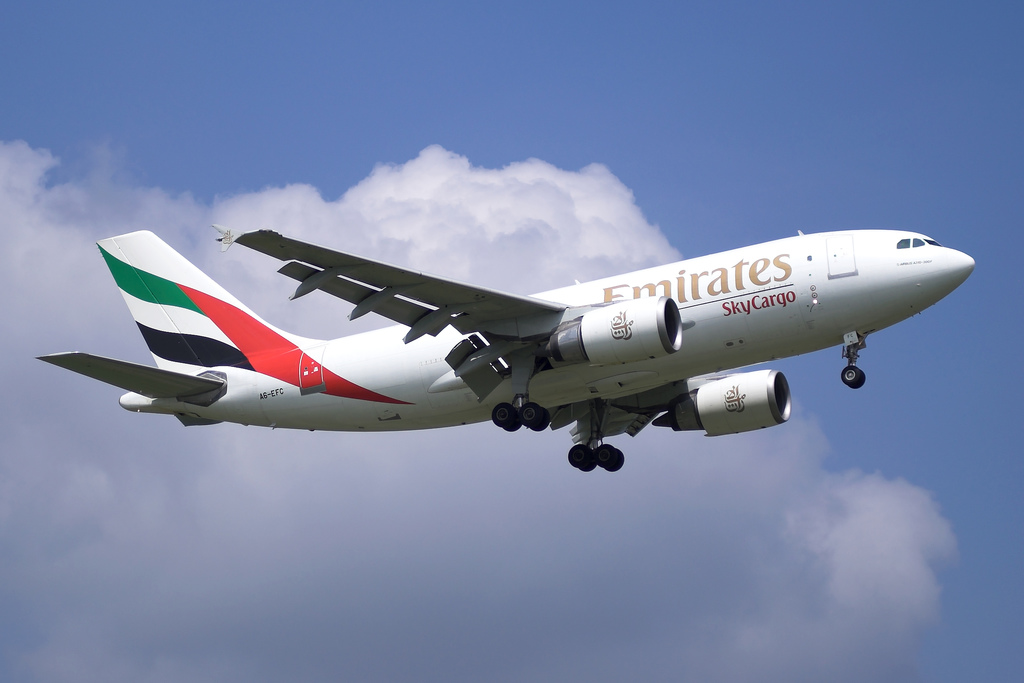
A former Emirates SkyCargo Airbus A310-300F

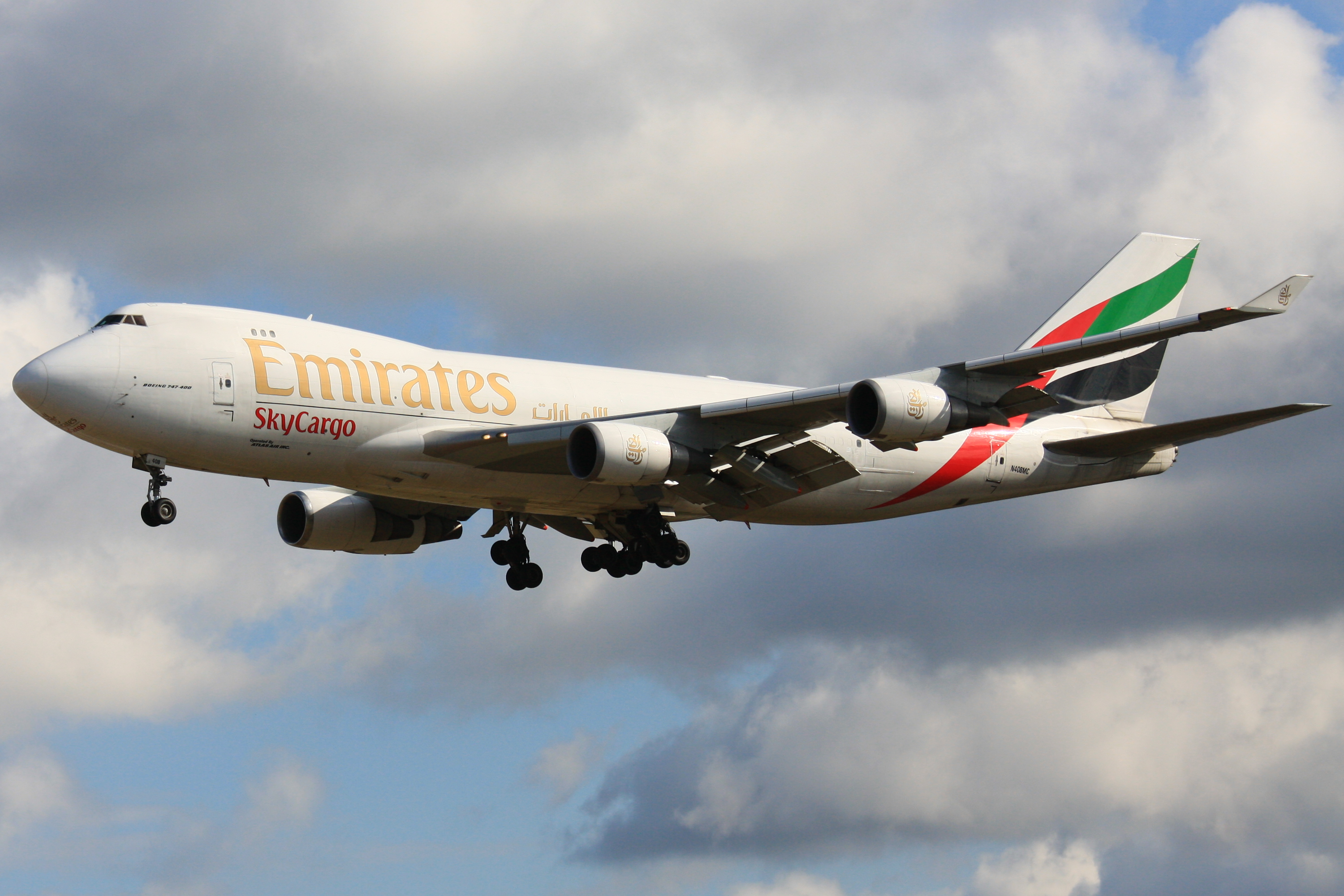
A former Emirates SkyCargo Boeing 747-400F

=== Early years ===
Emirates SkyCargo was established in October 1985, at the same time as Emirates was launched, operating as a separate entity from its parent company. In its first year, Emirates SkyCargo handled over 10,000 tonnes of freight. Emirates SkyCargo leased the entire freighter fleet from Emirates while also taking over management of the cargo holds in all of Emirates' passenger aircraft.

The airline received its first award in 1989. Since then, Emirates SkyCargo has received more than 100 international awards – including Best Cargo Airline to the Middle East for 20 years in a row.

On October 3, 1993, Emirates SkyCargo signed an agreement with EC International to handle all cargo shipments from the United States to 24 countries serviced by Emirates in the Middle East, Indian sub-continent, Europe and the Far East. New routes were launched when both Emirates began growing. Amsterdam was launched in 1997, the same year Emirates SkyCargo was experiencing growth and accounting for 16% of The Emirates Group's revenue.

=== Development since the 2000s ===
In May 2003, Emirates SkyCargo took delivery of a Boeing 747-400F, taking the freighter fleet to three Boeing 747Fs. Emirates SkyCargo was operating two Boeing 747-400Fs with capacity for 120 tonnes and a Boeing 747-200F with capacity for 110 tonnes. In September 2004, the airline launched freighter services to Johannesburg and Lahore. On November 20, 2005, Emirates announced orders for eight Boeing 777Fs, with the first aircraft scheduled for delivery in 2007, at the Dubai Airshow.

In 2005, Emirates SkyCargo and Korean Air Cargo signed an agreement to codeshare cargo capacity on two routes from India – Delhi and Mumbai.

In the financial year ending March 2006, Emirates SkyCargo announced revenues of over $1 billion and carried over one million tonnes of cargo. The freighter fleet included four freighters: one Boeing 747-400F and three Airbus A310-300Fs. In the same year, the airline also launched a freighter service to Barcelona using the A310-300F.

During the Farnborough Air Show in July 2006, Emirates signed a Heads of Agreement for ten Boeing 747-8F aircraft to be powered by General Electric's GEnx jet engines in a deal worth US$3.3 billion. In July 2008, Emirates sold these ten 747-8F frames as well as its earlier ordered eight 777F frames to Dubai Aerospace Enterprises, and agreed to lease them back.

In 2008, Emirates SkyCargo moved its operations into its new Cargo Mega Terminal, built on a 43,600 square metre site, has increased the ground-handling capacity by 1.2 million tonnes per year. The new addition increases Dubai International Airport's throughput capacity to 1.6 million tons a year.

On 27 March 2009, Emirates SkyCargo took delivery of its first Boeing 777F, bringing its total fleet to eight aircraft.

During the financial year 2008–09, Emirates SkyCargo handled 1.4 million tonnes of freight, which was a 9.8 per cent increase over the previous year. The division produced revenues of AED6.7bn in 2007–8. Emirates SkyCargo generated 19 per cent of The Emirates Group's total revenues, which increased 9.9 per cent to AED44.2bn despite an 82 per cent fall in its net profits, to AED982m. The Emirates SkyCargo service alone employed over 1,000 people as of 2009.

In November 2011, DAE cancelled five of the 747-8F orders and converted them to five 777Fs. In December 2012, DAE cancelled the remaining five 747-8F, with Emirates SkyCargo focusing its fleet on the 777F only.

In April 2013, Emirates SkyCargo was voted Air Cargo News Cargo Airline of the Year.

In July 2013, work started on a SkyCargo terminal. Once complete, Emirates will move their freighter operations from Dubai International Airport to the new facility at Dubai World Central - Al Maktoum International Airport. The facility is being built by Amana Contracting and Steel Buildings.

In May 2015, Emirates SkyCargo became the largest air freight carrier in the world to ban the transport of lion, tiger, rhino and elephant hunting trophies, even if they were obtained legally.

On April 1, 2020, Emirates transferred their cargo handling operations from Emirates SkyCentral DWC to Dubai International Airport in order to modernize the operations between freighter flights and the new cargo flights.

On June 24, 2020, Emirates introduced additional cargo capacity by using 14 Boeing 777-300ER aircraft with their seats removed from the economy class cabin.

On June 30, 2020, Emirates SkyCargo marked 30 years of operations in Singapore.

In November 2020, Emirates SkyCargo started to fly Emirates A380s as temporary freighters known as "Mini Freighters" to help combat the additional cargo freight needed with countries experiencing second waves of COVID-19. These will join the Emirates 777-300ER that have already been converted to cargo flights. An A380 has around 50 tonnes of cargo space per flight in the cargo hold in belly of the plane, this is just under 50% the amount of cargo a 777F can carry.

On November 15, 2021, Emirates announced an order for a pair of 777F aircraft from Boeing at the 2021 Dubai Airshow. This will be the airline's first order directly from Boeing instead of through a leasing agency, and these will join the current fleet of 777F and relieve some of the converted freighters.

On November 8, 2022, Emirates announced a firm order for five Boeing 777F aircraft, with two aircraft to be delivered in 2024 and the remaining three in 2025.

On July 16, 2024, Emirates announced that it would order an additional five Boeing 777F aircraft, with deliveries between 2025 and 2026.

== Destinations ==
As of January 2025, Emirates SkyCargo operates dedicated cargo flights to 26 destinations and additionally has access to cargo capacity on further 61 Emirates passenger routes.

== Fleet ==
=== Current fleet ===
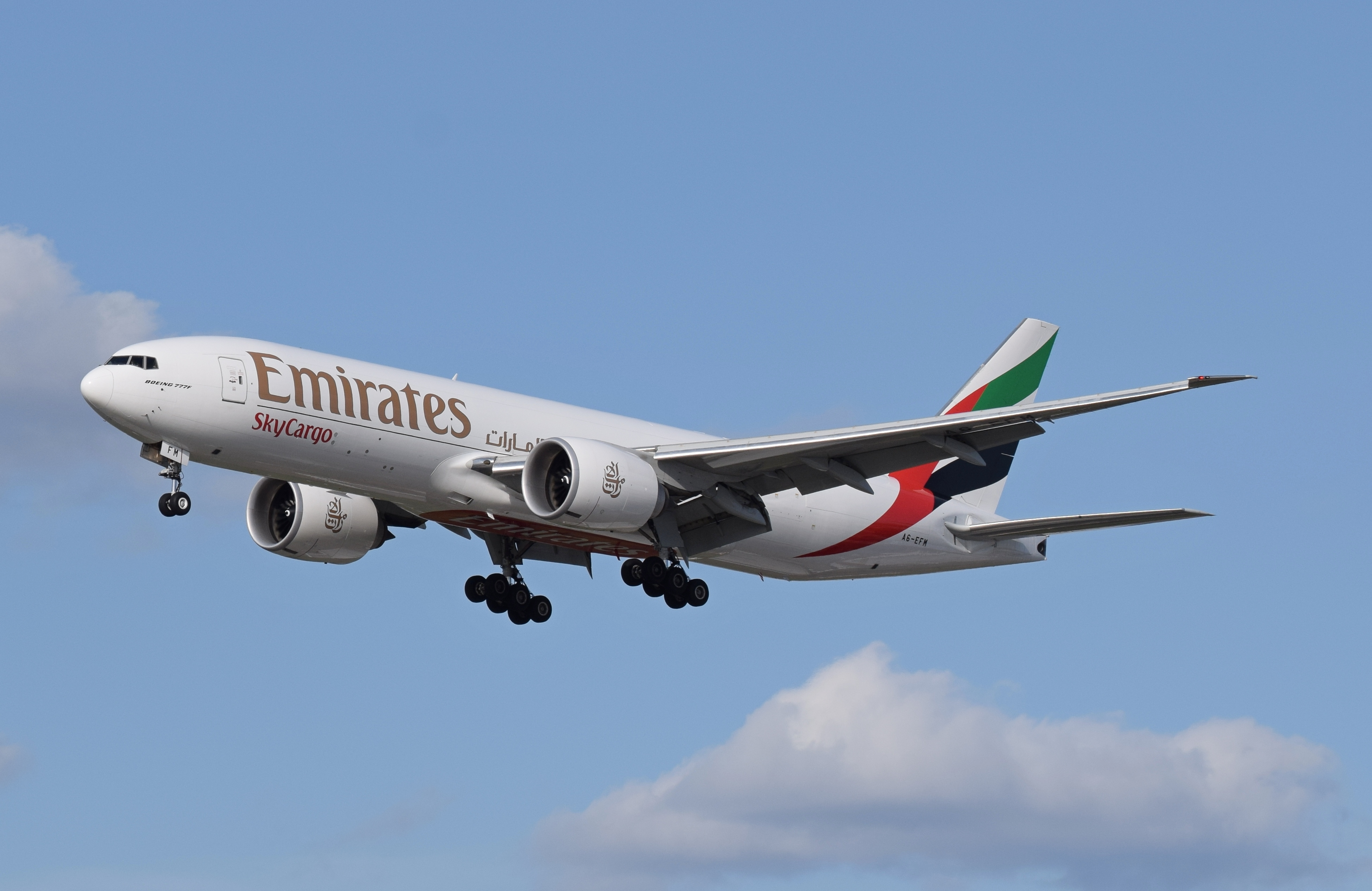
Emirates SkyCargo Boeing 777F

As of November 2026, Emirates SkyCargo operates an all-Boeing 777F fleet composed of the following aircraft:

Emirates SkyCargo fleet
Aircraft	Total	Orders	Notes
Boeing 777F	18	3	
Boeing 747-400 freighter	6	—	Wet-leased
Boeing 777-300ER/SF	3	—	One B777-300ERSF undergoing conversion
Total	27	3	

=== Former fleet ===
The airline previously operated the following aircraft:

Emirates SkyCargo former fleet
Aircraft	Total	Introduced	Retired	Notes
Airbus A310-300F	3	2005	2009	
Boeing 747-400ERF	2	2017	2017	Leased from ASL Airlines Belgium.
Boeing 747-400F	4	2001	2013	Leased and operated by Atlas Air.

== Incidents and accidents ==
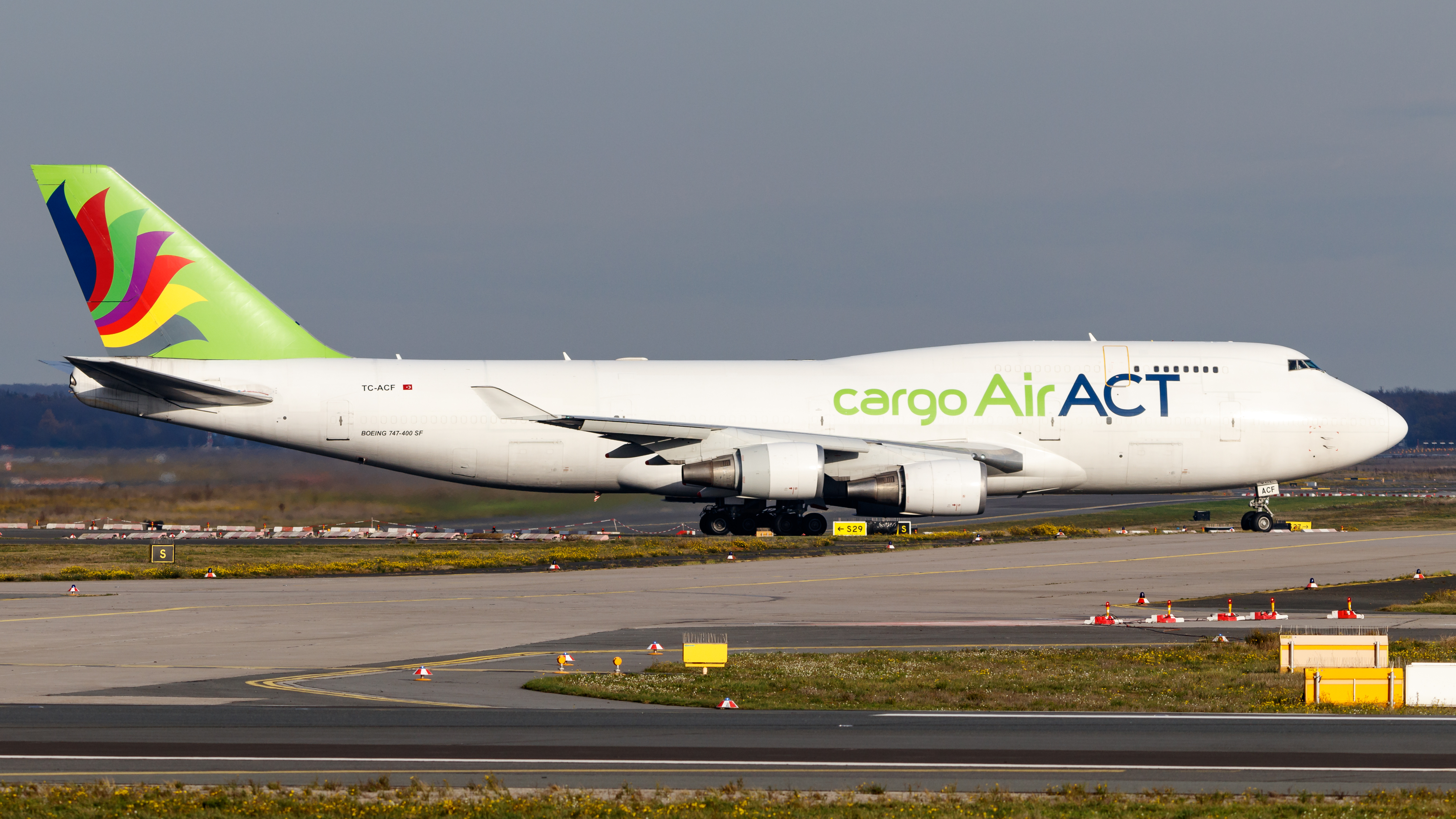
TC-ACF, the Boeing 747-481BDSF involved in Flight 9788, leased from Air ACT Cargo

- On 20 October 2025, Emirates SkyCargo Flight 9788, a Boeing 747-400BDSF operated by Turkish carrier Air ACT, crash landed on Runway 07L at Hong Kong International Airport. The aircraft touched down then turned away from the runway, crashed through the fencing and collided with a airport patrol vehicle that was travelling on a road outside of the runway's fencing. The patrol car got pushed by the aircraft into the sea and plunged into the water. All four crew members onboard survived, however the two people in the patrol vehicle struck by the plane died.

== Notes ==
- The Emirates Group does not publish figures separately for Emirates SkyCargo or Emirates; both of the companies' financial results are totalled together.
