= Bouna Medoune Seye =

Senegalese film director (1956–2017)

Bouna Medoune Seye (Bouna Médoune Sèye)
- Born: 19 October 1956; Dakar, French West Africa
- Died: 27 December 2017 (aged 61); Paris, France
- Occupations: painter, photographer, costume designer, film director, screen writer, film producer

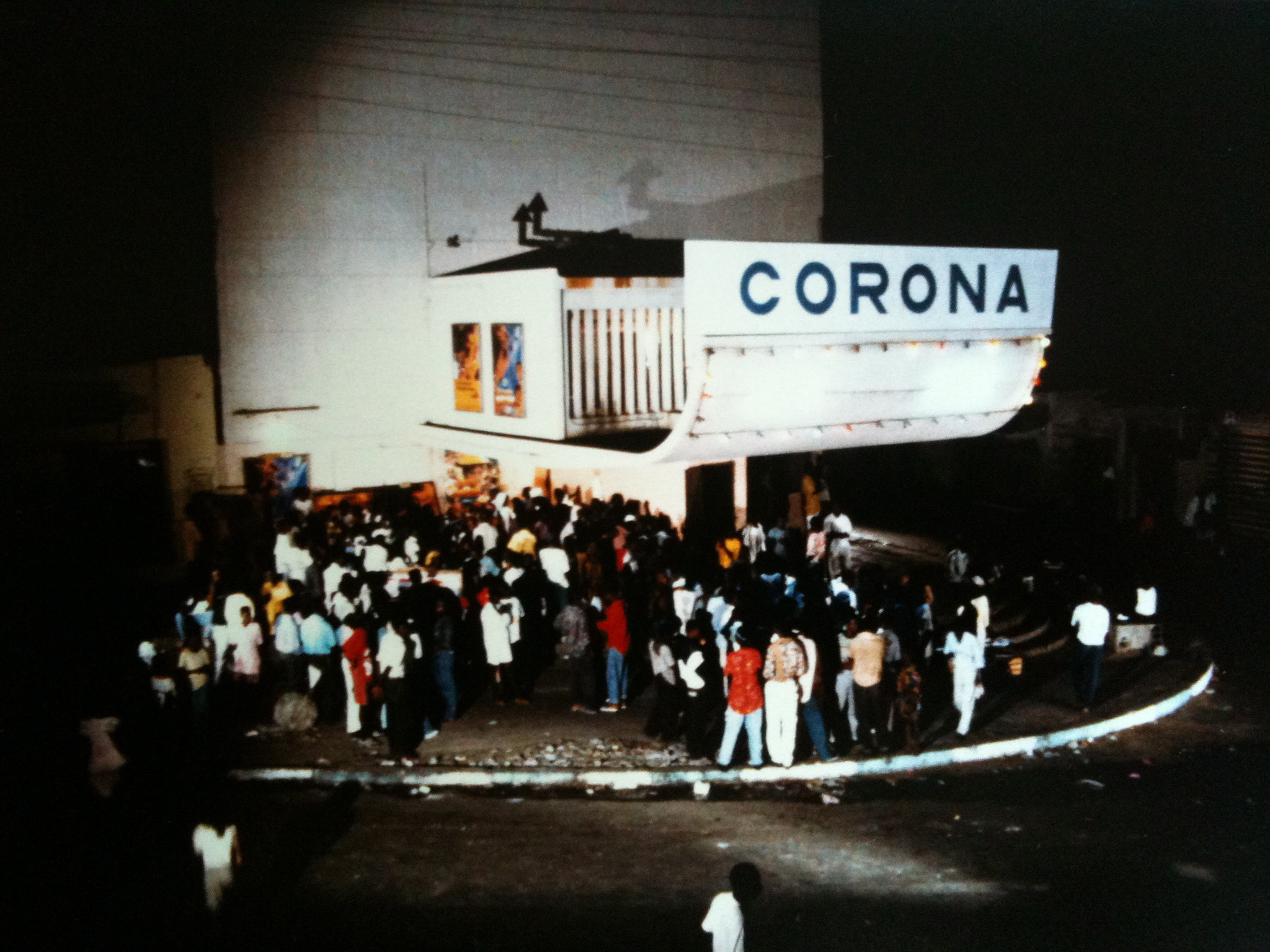
The set of Seye's first short film Bandit Cinéma in front of the Corona cinema, Dakar, 1992.

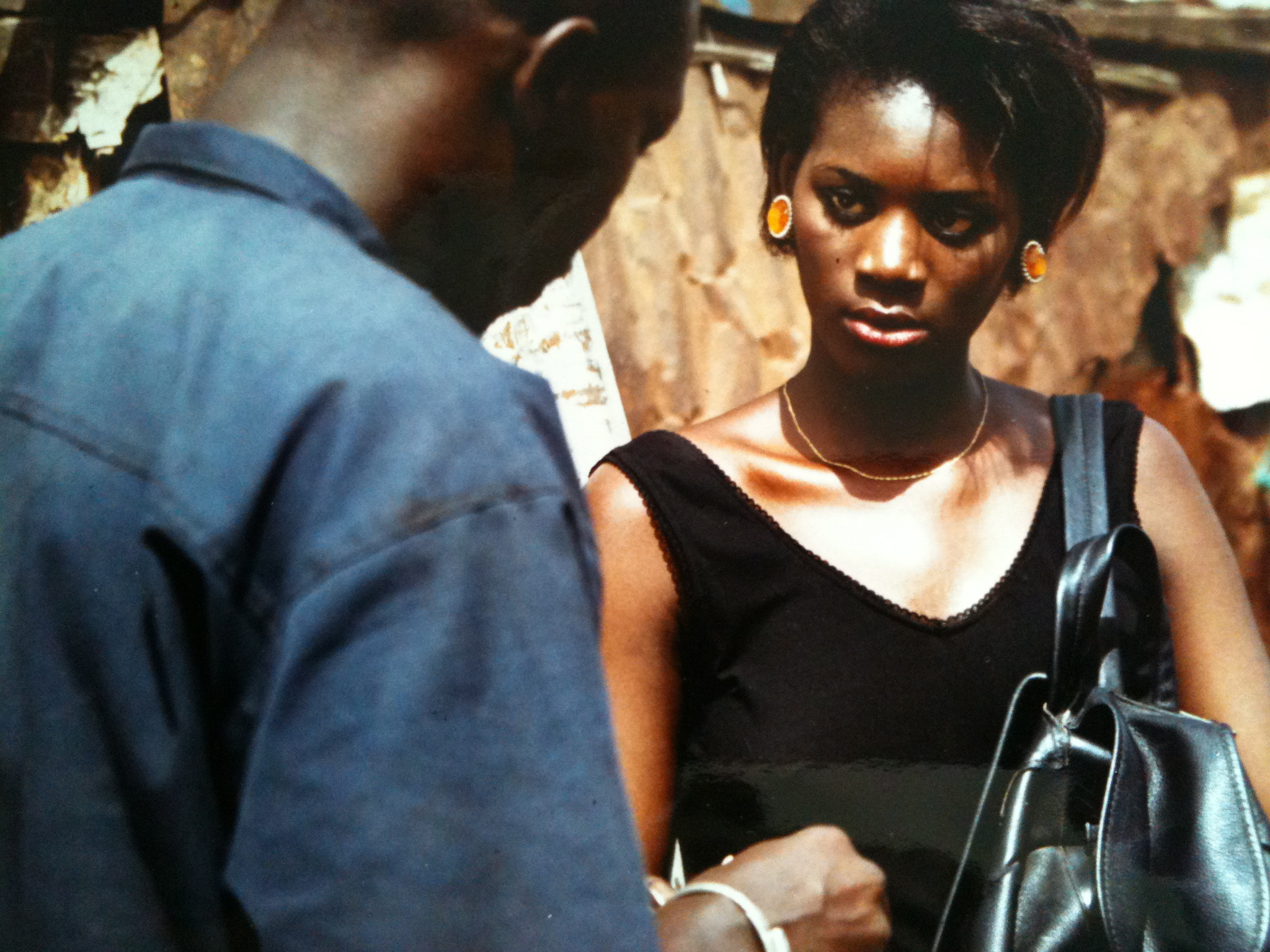
A scene of Bandit Cinéma, 1992.

Bouna Medoune Seye (also Bouna Médoune Sèye, 19 October 1956 – 27 December 2017) was a Senegalese painter, photographer, costume designer and filmmaker.

== Biography ==
Born in Dakar, Senegal, he studied in Marseilles, France, and photographed the tramps on the streets of Dakar for five years. He then started out in cinema as an art director and later film director.

== Filmography ==
Sèye was involved in a number of films including:

- 1994 Bandit Cinéma, short drama, 24 minutes, director and screen writer
- 1994 Flora Gomes: A Mascara (Le Masque), set photographer
- 1995 Saï Saï By – dans les Tapas de Dakar, 13 minutes, director
- 1995 Les pieds dans les rues de Dakar, director
- 1995 Gahité Fofana: Témèdi, art director
- 1996 Rouge feu, director
- 1997 Moussa Sene Absa: Tableau Ferraille, production designer
- 1998 Zone Rap, documentary, 52 minutes, director
- 2007 Léandre-Alain Baker: Ramata, costume designer

== Exhibitions ==
=== Paintings ===
- 1993 Peinture Racine, Chambre Blanche Gallery, Quebec, Canada
- 2000 Heart Gallery, Paris
- 2002 Dakar Biennale
- 2005 Exhibition "This is happening", together with Pascal Nampémanla Traoré (Côte d'Ivoire), Dakar, Senegal

=== Photography ===
- 1992 co-organiser, Mois de la Photo(graphie) de Dakar, Dakar, Senegal
- 1992 Centre Wallonie-Bruxelles, Paris
- 1994 Les Trottoirs de Dakar, Centre d'Art Contemporain Genève, and at Black Movie International Independent Film Festival Geneva
- 1997 Suites Africaines, Cordeliers Convent, Paris
- 1997 Les Trottoirs de Dakar, Evocos, Lisbon
- 1998 La cour de Joe, Maison européenne de la photographie, Paris, France
- 1998 with other photographers: L'Afrique par elle-même, Pinacoteca do Estado de São Paulo
- 1999 with other photographers: L'Afrique par elle-même, Smithsonian Institution, Washington, D.C. and Iziko South African National Gallery, Cape Town
- 2001 African Photography Encounters, Bamako
- 2002 NRW Forum, Düsseldorf

== Publication ==
- Bouna Medoune Seye (1994). Les trottoirs de Dakar (Dakar sidewalks). Paris: Editions Revue noire. p. 96. ISBN 9782909571096. 51 photographs.

== See also ==
- Cinema of Senegal
- Dorris Haron Kasco
