= Juan Carlos Guzmán-Betancourt =

Colombian criminal and impostor (born 1976)

Juan Carlos Guzmán-Betancourt (born 1976) is a Colombian impostor and conman. Guzmán is believed to have stolen at least $1 million in various countries. He has used at least ten different false identities and has been pursued in Colombia, Venezuela, Mexico, Canada, Russia, Thailand and Japan.

== Early life ==
Guzmán was born in 1976 in Roldanillo, Colombia. On June 4, 1993, he traveled to Miami as a wheel-well stowaway, calling himself Guillermo Rosales. As an unnamed male, "13 years old", he was listed in the FAA report on flights with stowaways.

== Criminal record ==
Betancourt was first arrested in the United Kingdom in 1998 on suspicion of four burglaries at Le Méridien Piccadilly Hotel, and of using a stolen credit card. In the U.S. states of Virginia, New York, and Florida, Guzmán was convicted of larceny and credit card fraud, being deported from the U.S. three times. In 2010 Betancourt was sentenced to 30 months in federal prison for entering the United States illegally from Canada. He had in his possession a passport from Spain with his photo and a false name (Jordi Ejarque-Rodriguez) obtained from the Spanish consulate in Abu Dhabi.

== Television portrayal ==
Betancourt is portrayed in the third season of the popular British series Con Men Case Files in the fifth episode entitled "The Perfect 5 Star Hotel Con" (2011).
