= Gahité Fofana =

Guinean film director

- Born: 1965 (age 60–61); France
- Citizenship: Guinean
- Occupations: Film director, screen writer, film editor
- Known for: Mathias, le procès des gangs (1997), I.T. – Immatriculation temporaire (2001), Un matin bonne heure (2006), La lune est tombée (2015)

Gahité Fofana (born 1965 in France) is a Guinean film director, producer, Film editor, actor and screen writer who studied literature and filmmaking in Paris. Starting out as a creator of documentary films, he later wrote, directed and produced feature films.

== Filmography ==
Fofana's films include:

| Year | Film | Description | Role | Duration |
|---|---|---|---|---|
| 1994 | Tanun | Documentary | Writer, director | 54m |
| 1995 | Saï Saï by, Dakar la salope / Dans les tapats de Dakar | Documentary by Bouna Médoune Sèye | Editor | 12m |
| 1995 | Une parole, un visage (A word, a face) | Documentary | Director | 26m |
| 1996 | Témédy (Temedy, Tèmèdy) | Short | Writer, director, editor | 10m |
| 1997 | Mathias, le procès des gangs (Mathias, the trial of gangs) | Documentary | Writer, director | 50m |
| 1998 | Le Soleil se maquille (Sun makes up) | Documentary | Director | 26m |
| 2001 | I.T. – Immatriculation temporaire (Temporary registration) | Feature | Writer, director, producer, actor | 1h 13m |
| 2005 | Un matin bonne heure (Yaguine et Fodé) (Early one morning) | Feature | Writer, director, producer, editor | 1h 15m |
| 2011 | 28 Septembre, Année Zéro | Documentary | Director, editor | 52m |
| 2012 | La Journée de N'ga Touré | Documentary by Billy Touré | Producer | 13m |
| 2013 | Rêves meurtris | Documentary by Hady M. Diawara | Producer | 13m |
| 2015 | La lune est tombé (The moon fell, Hinter dem Mond) | Feature | Writer, director, producer, editor | 1h 17m |
| 2017 | Wallay | Feature by Berni Goldblat | Adaptation | 1h 24m |

== Awards ==
Fofana won Special Jury Prizes at the Venice Film Festival in 1996 for Une parole, un visage and Tèmèdy and at the Festival International du Film Francophone de Namur (FIFF) in 2001 for I.T. – Immatriculation temporaire.
