= Amana Contracting and Steel Buildings =

Company of the United Arab Emirates

AMANA Group
- Native name: أمانة للمقاولات والمباني الحديدية
- Company type: Limited Liability Company
- Industry: Construction
- Founded: Abu Dhabi, United Arab Emirates (12 September 1993)
- Headquarters: Dubai, United Arab Emirates
- Area served: United Arab Emirates, Qatar, Kuwait, Saudi Arabia, Oman, Egypt, Sri Lanka
- Key people: Chebel Bsaibes (President & Chief Executive Officer); Riad Bsaibes (Chief Operating Officer); Ghassan Jaber (Chief Financial Officer) Ghassan Assaf (Director of Operations)
- Number of employees: 11,000
- Website: www.amanabuildings.com Amana Contracting and Steel Buildings

Amana Contracting and Steel Buildings is a UAE based industrial and commercial design-build construction company. It specializes in fast-track, turnkey construction of commercial, industrial and institutional low-rise facilities.

== Offices ==
Founded in Abu Dhabi in 1993, Amana Contracting and Steel Buildings now runs its operations through various offices in the United Arab Emirates, Qatar and Saudi Arabia.

== Projects ==
Over the years, Amana Contracting and Steel Buildings has undertaken various projects across numerous industries. Some of these construction projects include:

- QICC cable factory in Doha
- Lulu Hypermarket in Dibba
- Oryx Metal industries in Oman
- Cooling plant for Dubai Metro
- TAKREER research center in Abu Dhabi
- Cast house and offices for EMAL
- Solar field assembly for Shams solar power station
- Emirates SkyCargo Terminal
- Phase 1 of the Dubai Design District (D3)
- IKEA Distribution Center - Dubai
- Nestle Dubai Manufacturing
- Inbound Warehouse for Almarai in Al Kharj
- Fruit Cold Store for Del Monte Foods in Khorma
- Warehouse and Offices for RSA Logistics in Dubai Logistics City
- US$160m Food Plant for BRF S.A. in Abu Dhabi
- Presidential Flights Hangar 2 at Abu Dhabi International Airport
- ADNOC Accommodations in Ruwais by DuBox
- RSA Cold Chain Facility in Dubai South
- Light Industrial Units for Jebel Ali Free Zone Authority

== Awards ==
In 2009, Amana Contracting and Steel Buildings was awarded the Dubai Quality Appreciation Program certificate for the construction field. In 2014, the company was awarded the CSR Label by The Dubai Chamber of Commerce and Industry.
