= Dorris (surname) =

Dorris is a surname. Notable people with the name may include:

- Andy Dorris (born 1951), American football player
- Anita Dorris (1903–1993), German actress of the Silent era
- Danielle Dorris (born 2002), Canadian Paralympic swimmer
- Derek Dorris (born 1978), American football player
- George Dorris (born 1930), American dance historian, educator, editor, and writer
- Michael Dorris (1945–1997), American author

== See also ==
- Dorris Haron Kasco (born 1966), Ivorian photographer
