= Yaguine Koita and Fodé Tounkara =

Guinean stowaways

- Born: Yaguine Koïta: September 25, 1984; Fodé Tounkara: April 6, 1985; Conakry, Guinea
- Died: July 28, 1999 (aged 14); Brussels, Belgium
- Cause of death: Hypothermia
- Known for: Airplane stowaways

Yaguine Koïta (September 25, 1984 – July 28, 1999) and Fodé Tounkara (April 6, 1985 – July 28, 1999) were wheel-well stowaways who froze to death on a Sabena Airlines Airbus A330 (Flight 520) flying from Conakry, Guinea, to Brussels, Belgium, on July 28, 1999. Their bodies were discovered on August 2 in the airplane's rear right-hand wheel bay at Brussels International Airport, after having made at least three return trips between Conakry and Brussels. The boys were carrying plastic bags with birth certificates, school report cards, family photographs and a letter. This letter, written in imperfect French, was widely published in the world media. Several associations commemorate Yaguine and Fodé annually on August 2 at Brussels Airport.

Guinean filmmaker Gahité Fofana made their story into a film - Early in the Morning (French: Un matin bonne heure) in 2006. Singer and songwriter John Legend dedicated his 2007 song "Show Me" to the boys and their story.
