= Emirates fleet =

List of aircraft operated by Emirates

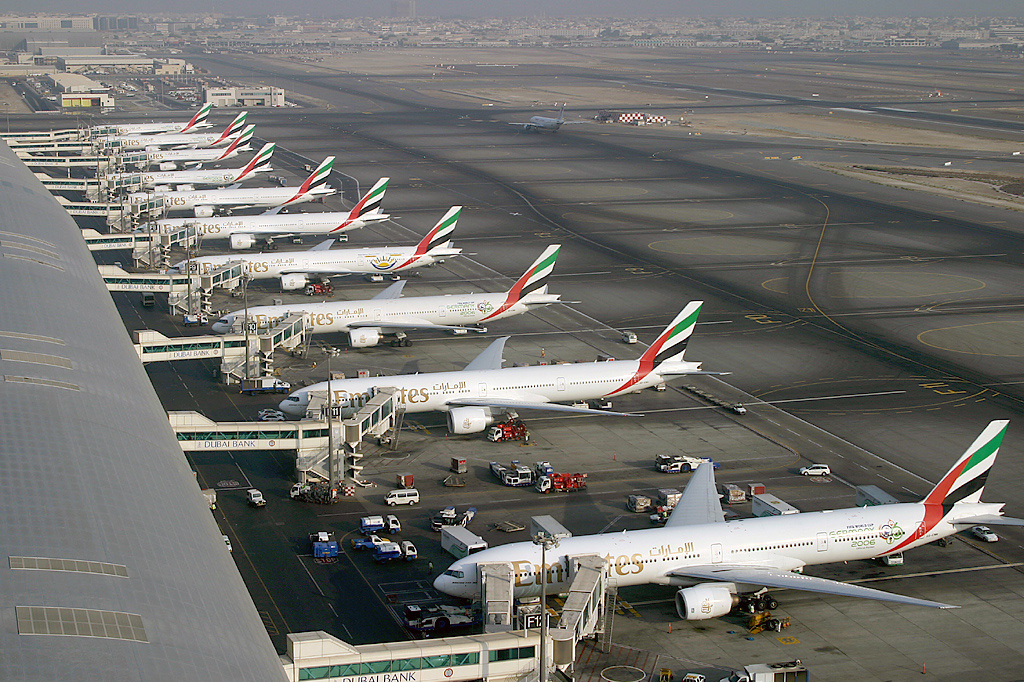
A row of Emirates aircraft at Dubai International Airport in 2005

Emirates (Note: Arabic: طَيَران الإمارات) is one of the two flag carrier airlines of the United Arab Emirates, the other being Etihad Airways, and is currently the largest airline in the Middle East. The airline's fleet is composed of three wide-bodied aircraft families, the Airbus A350, Airbus A380 and Boeing 777, the latter two of which Emirates is the largest operator. The airline also has Boeing 777X and Boeing 787 aircraft on order.

== Current fleet ==
As of October 2026, Emirates operates an all-wide-body fleet composed of the following aircraft:

Emirates current fleet

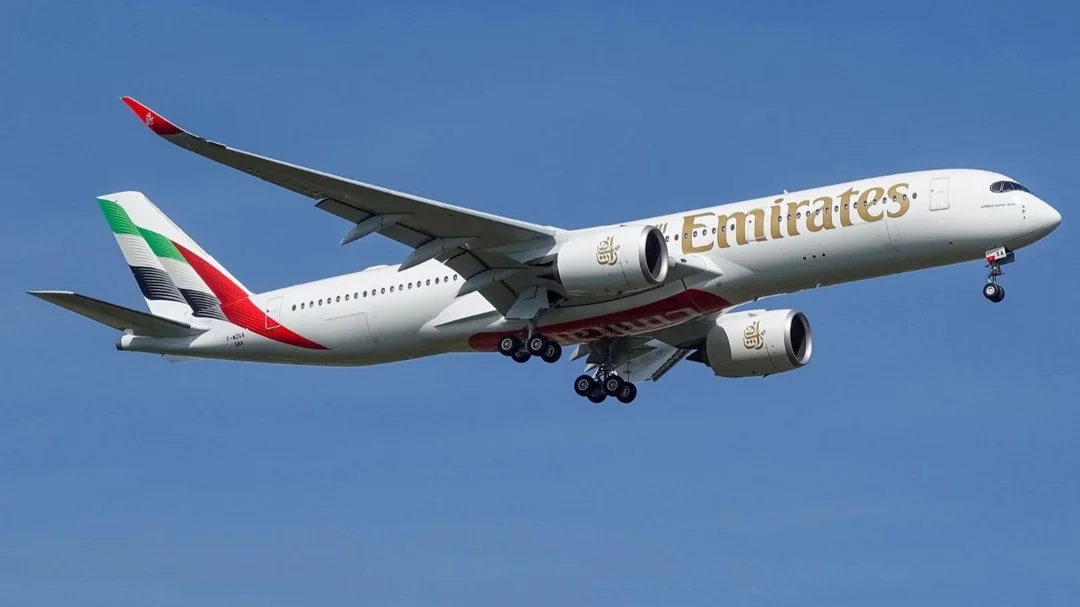
Airbus A350-900

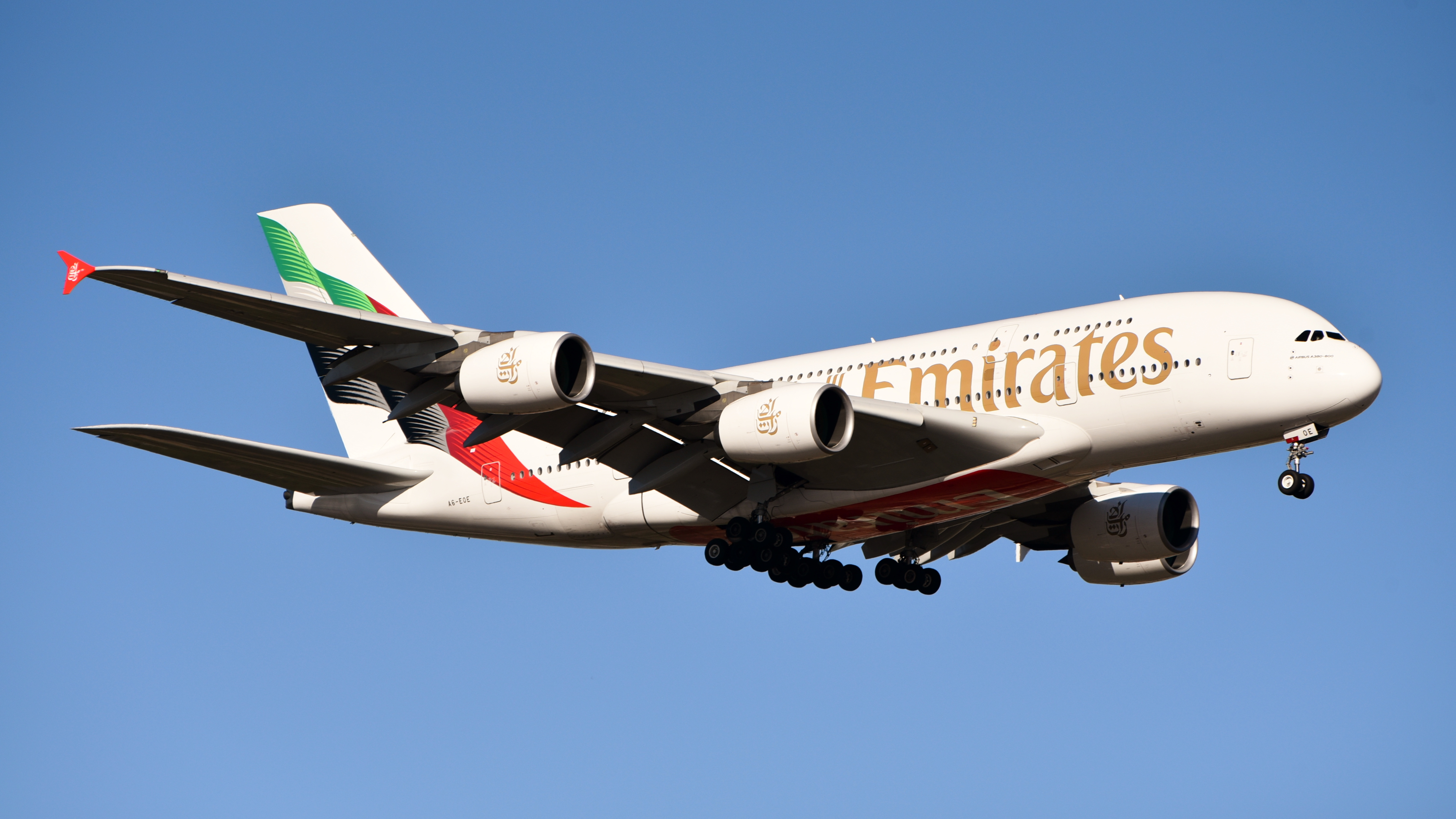
Airbus A380-800

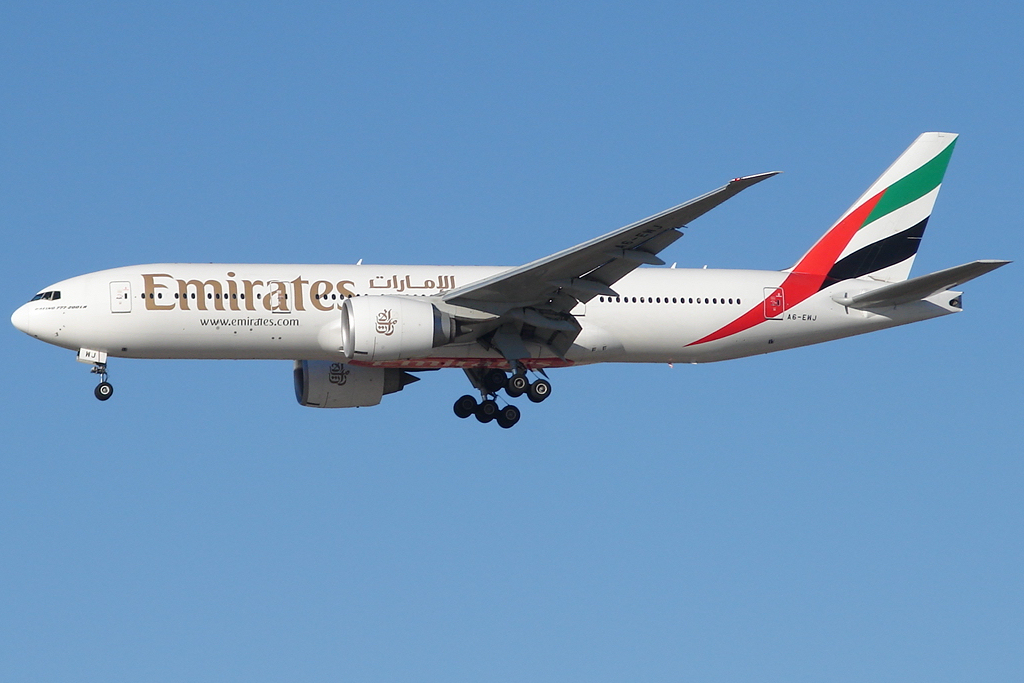
Boeing 777-200LR, in the airline's previous livery

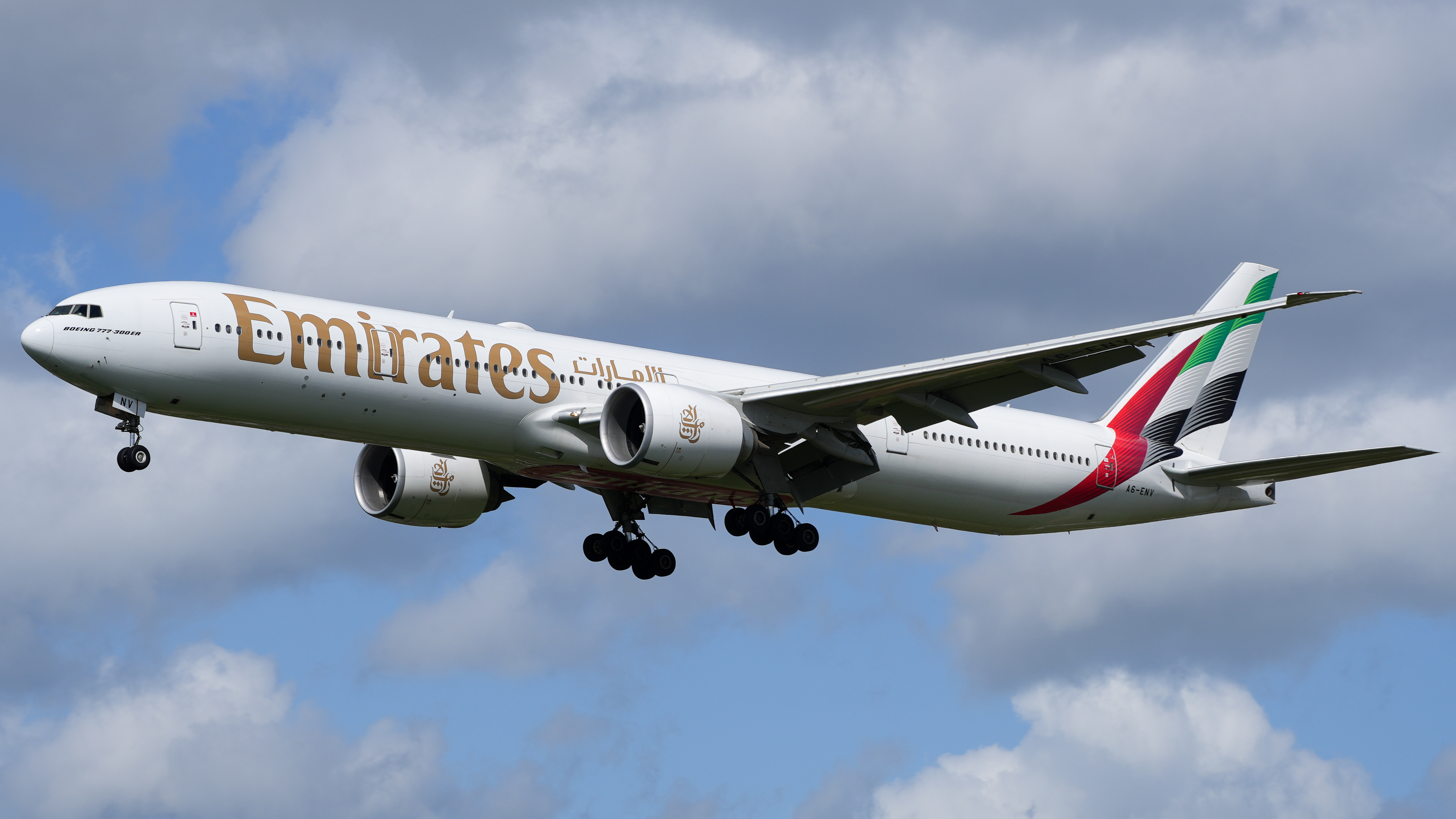
Boeing 777-300ER

Emirates fleet
Aircraft	In service	Orders	Passengers					Notes
Aircraft	In service	Orders	F	J	W	Y	Total	Notes
Airbus A350-900	30	43	—	32	28	238	298	Ultra long-haul configuration
Airbus A350-900	30	43	—	32	21	259	312	Regional configuration
Airbus A380-800	116	—	14	76	56	322	468	Largest operator 110 aircraft to be retrofitted with premium economy seats Includes A6-EVS (MSN 272), the last ever A380 built
Airbus A380-800	116	—	14	76	56	338	484	Largest operator 110 aircraft to be retrofitted with premium economy seats Includes A6-EVS (MSN 272), the last ever A380 built
Airbus A380-800	116	—	14	76	56	341	487	Largest operator 110 aircraft to be retrofitted with premium economy seats Includes A6-EVS (MSN 272), the last ever A380 built
Airbus A380-800	116	—	14	76	—	399	489	Largest operator 110 aircraft to be retrofitted with premium economy seats Includes A6-EVS (MSN 272), the last ever A380 built
Airbus A380-800	116	—	14	76	—	401	491	Largest operator 110 aircraft to be retrofitted with premium economy seats Includes A6-EVS (MSN 272), the last ever A380 built
Airbus A380-800	116	—	14	76	—	427	517	Largest operator 110 aircraft to be retrofitted with premium economy seats Includes A6-EVS (MSN 272), the last ever A380 built
Airbus A380-800	116	—	14	76	—	429	519	Largest operator 110 aircraft to be retrofitted with premium economy seats Includes A6-EVS (MSN 272), the last ever A380 built
Airbus A380-800	116	—	—	76	56	437	569	New high density configuration
Airbus A380-800	116	—	—	58	—	557	615	To be reconfigured to 3 class high density
Boeing 777-200LR	10	—	—	38	24	214	276	Largest operator 109 aircraft to be retrofitted with premium economy seats
Boeing 777-300ER	113	—	6	38	24	256	324	Largest operator 109 aircraft to be retrofitted with premium economy seats
Boeing 777-300ER	113	—	8	40	24	256	328	Largest operator 109 aircraft to be retrofitted with premium economy seats
Boeing 777-300ER	113	—	8	40	24	260	332	Largest operator 109 aircraft to be retrofitted with premium economy seats
Boeing 777-300ER	113	—	8	42	—	304	354	Largest operator 109 aircraft to be retrofitted with premium economy seats
Boeing 777-300ER	113	—	8	42	—	310	360	Largest operator 109 aircraft to be retrofitted with premium economy seats
Boeing 777-300ER	113	—	—	35	—	386	421	Largest operator 109 aircraft to be retrofitted with premium economy seats
Boeing 777-8	—	35	TBA					
Boeing 777-9	—	235	TBA					Deliveries planned to start from 2027
Boeing 787-8	—	20	TBA					
Boeing 787-10	—	15	TBA					
Total	269	348						

=== Executive fleet ===
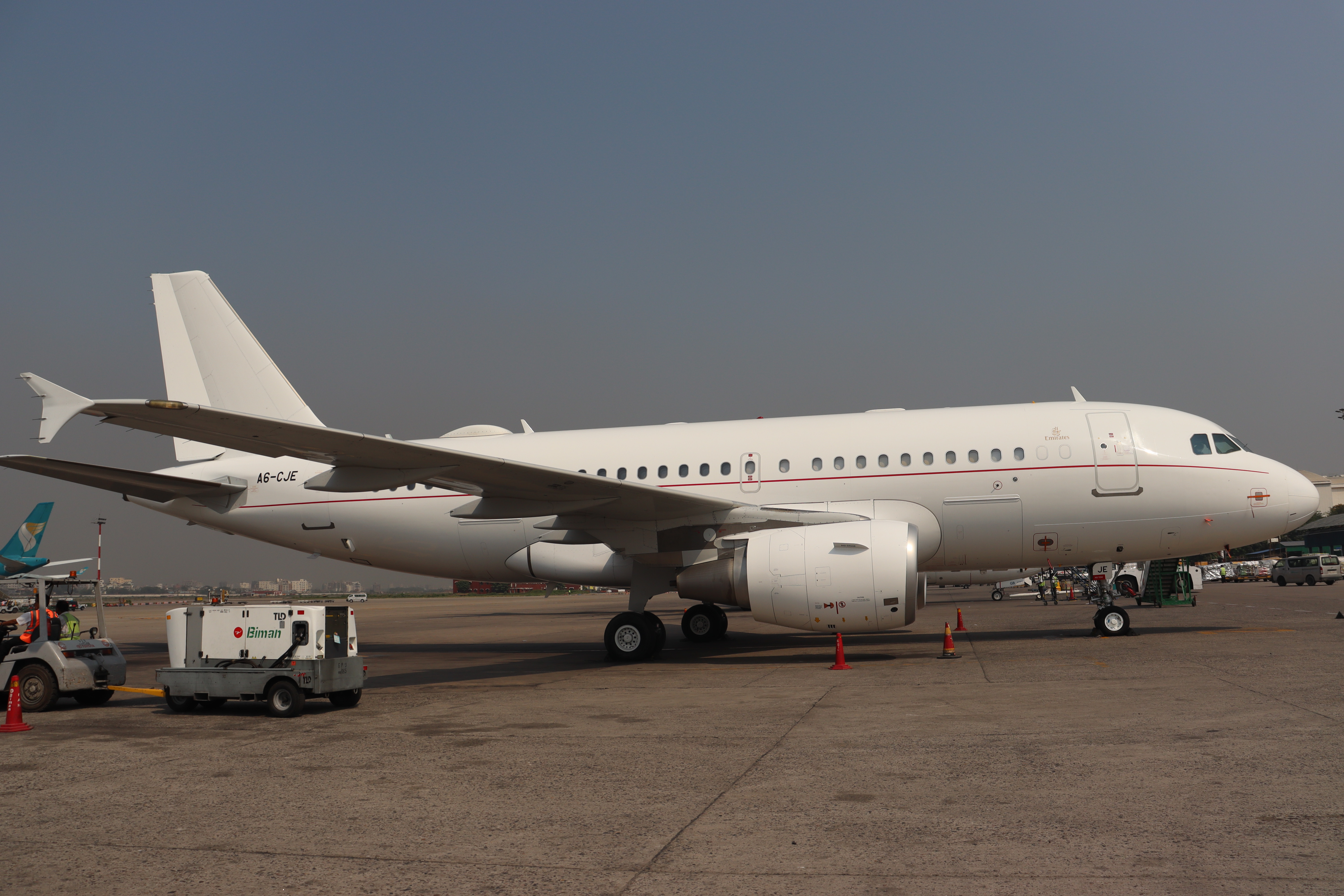
Executive ACJ319, registered as A6-CJE

The Emirates executive fleet consists of the following aircraft:

Emirates executive fleet
Aircraft	Fleet	Orders	Passengers
Airbus ACJ319	1	—	10 (suites); 5 (beds)
Total	1		

== Historical fleet ==
Emirates historical fleet

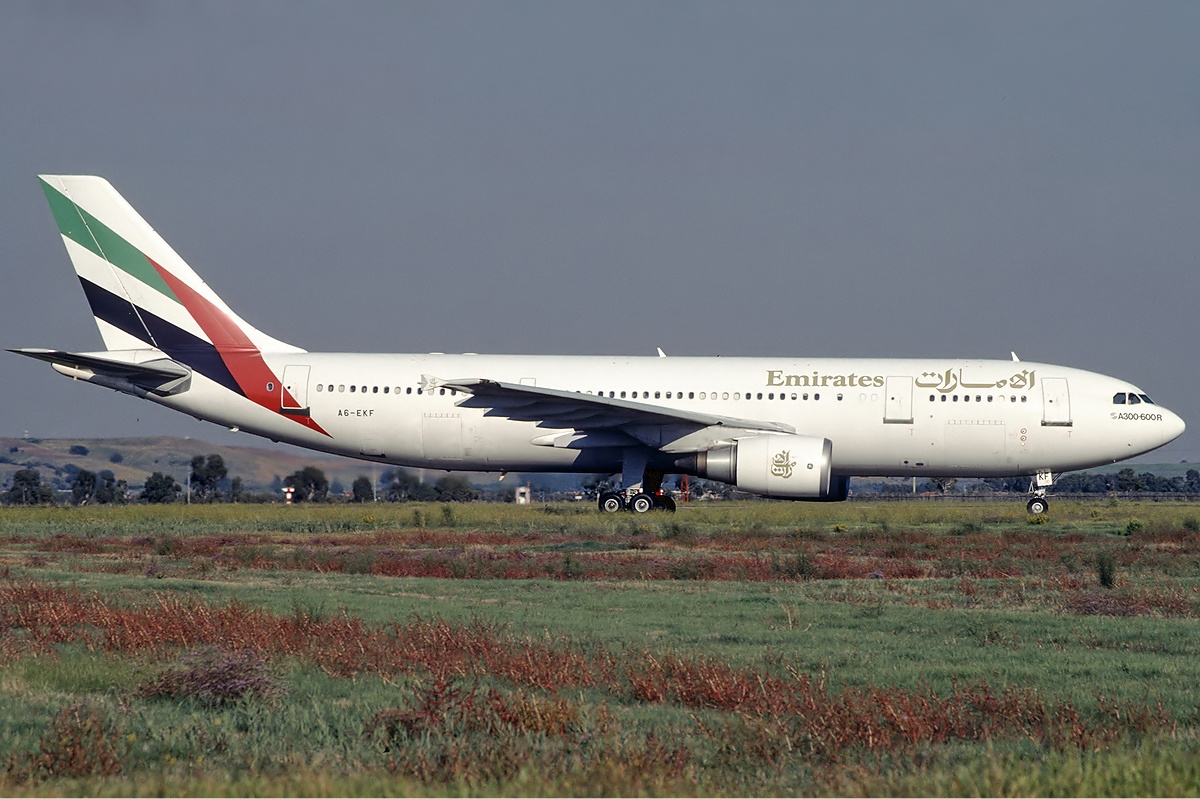
Airbus A300-600R

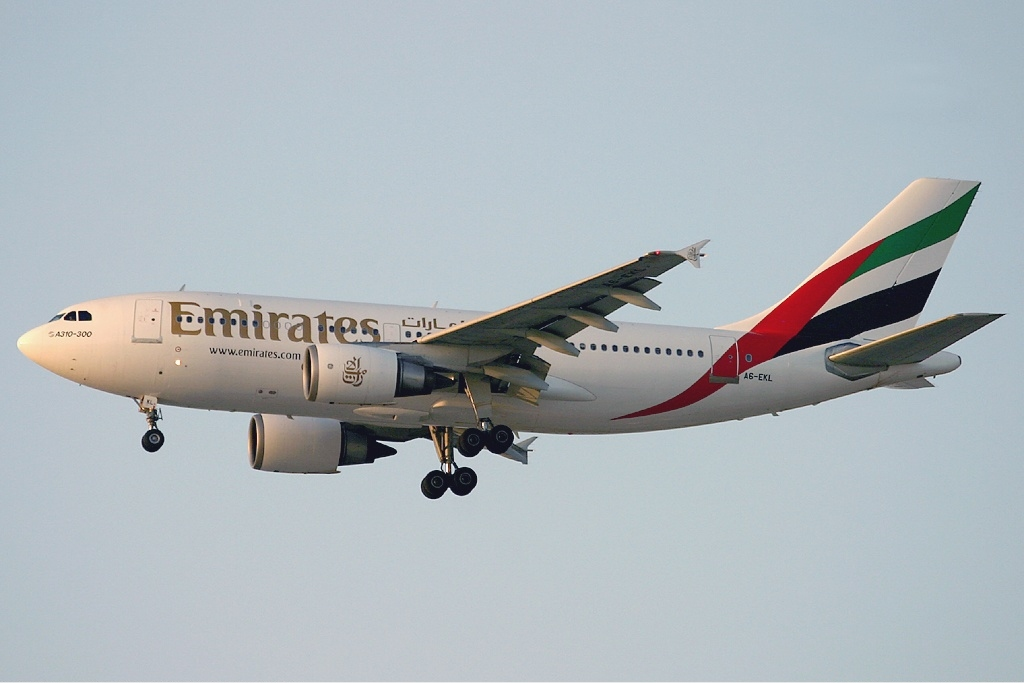
Airbus A310-300

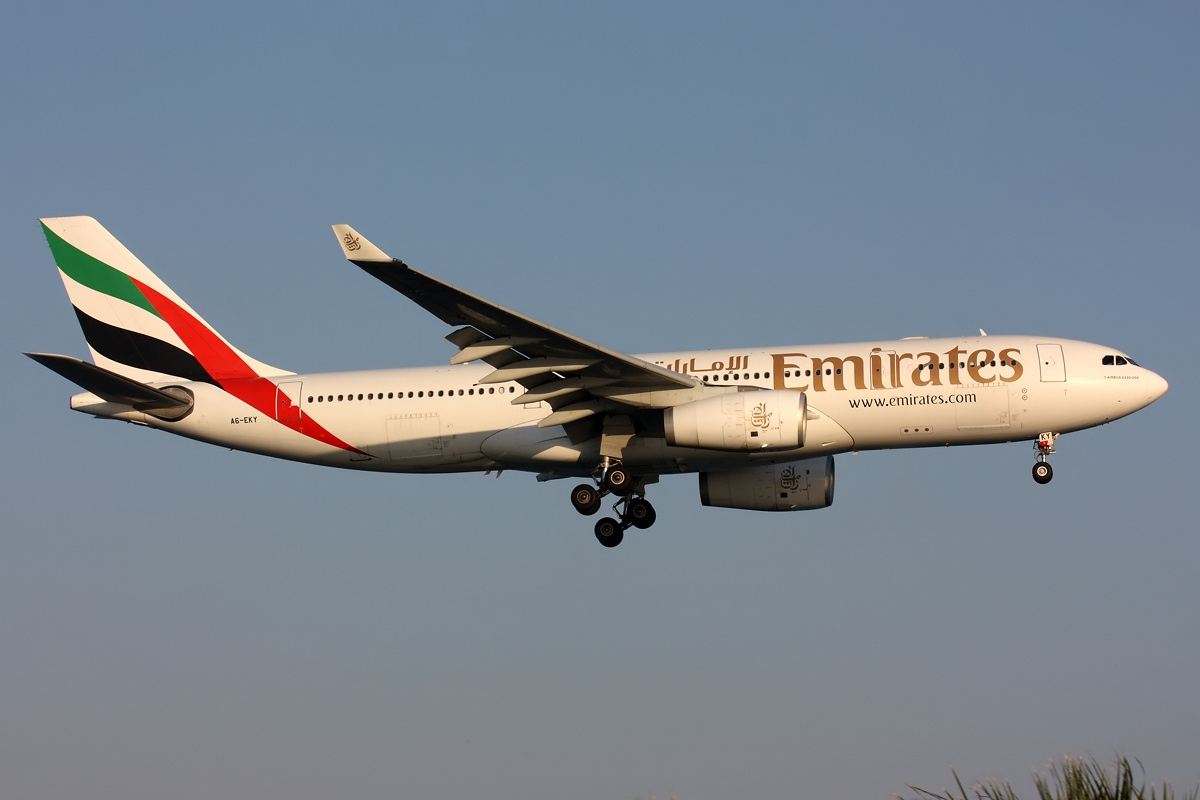
Airbus A330-200

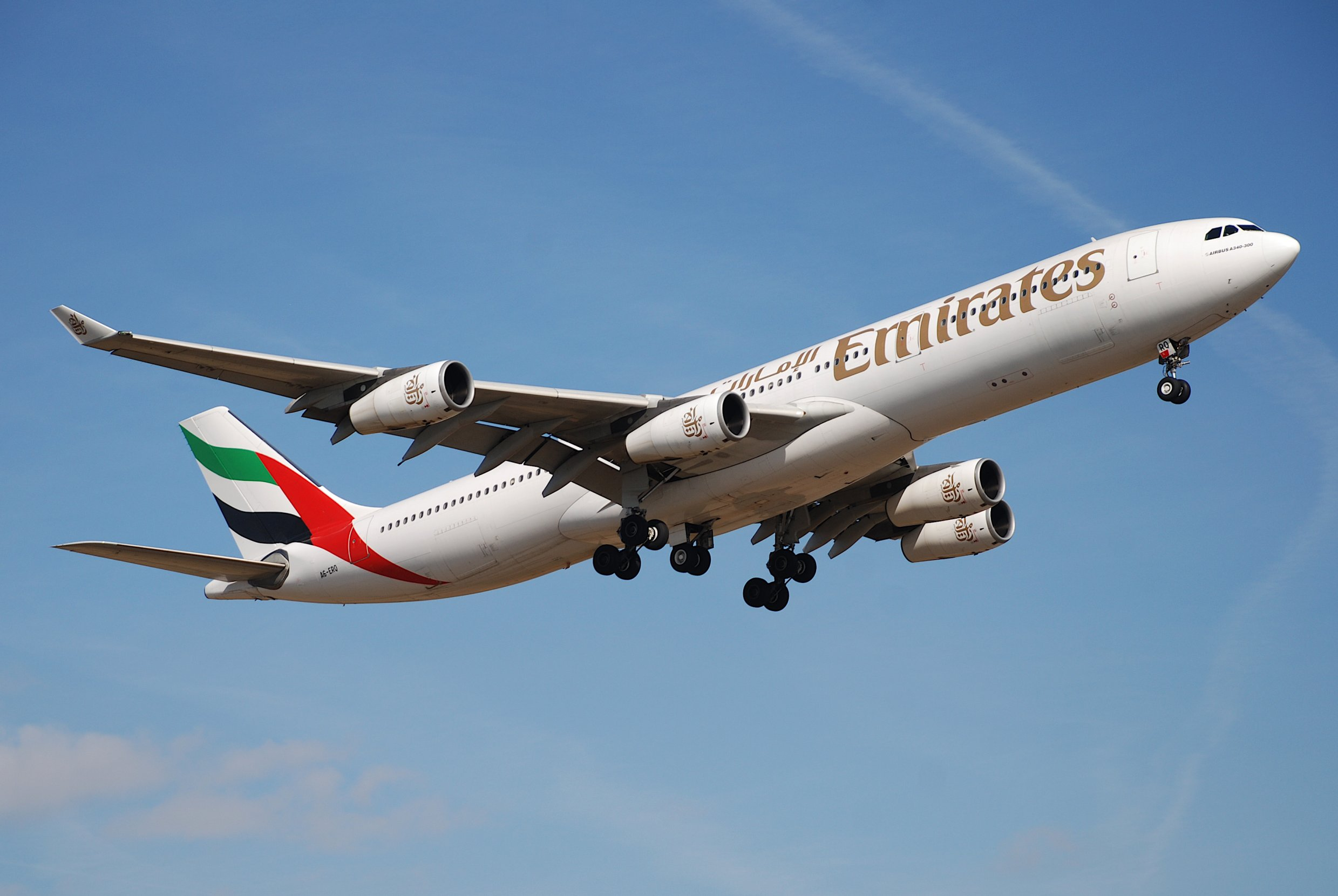
Airbus A340-300

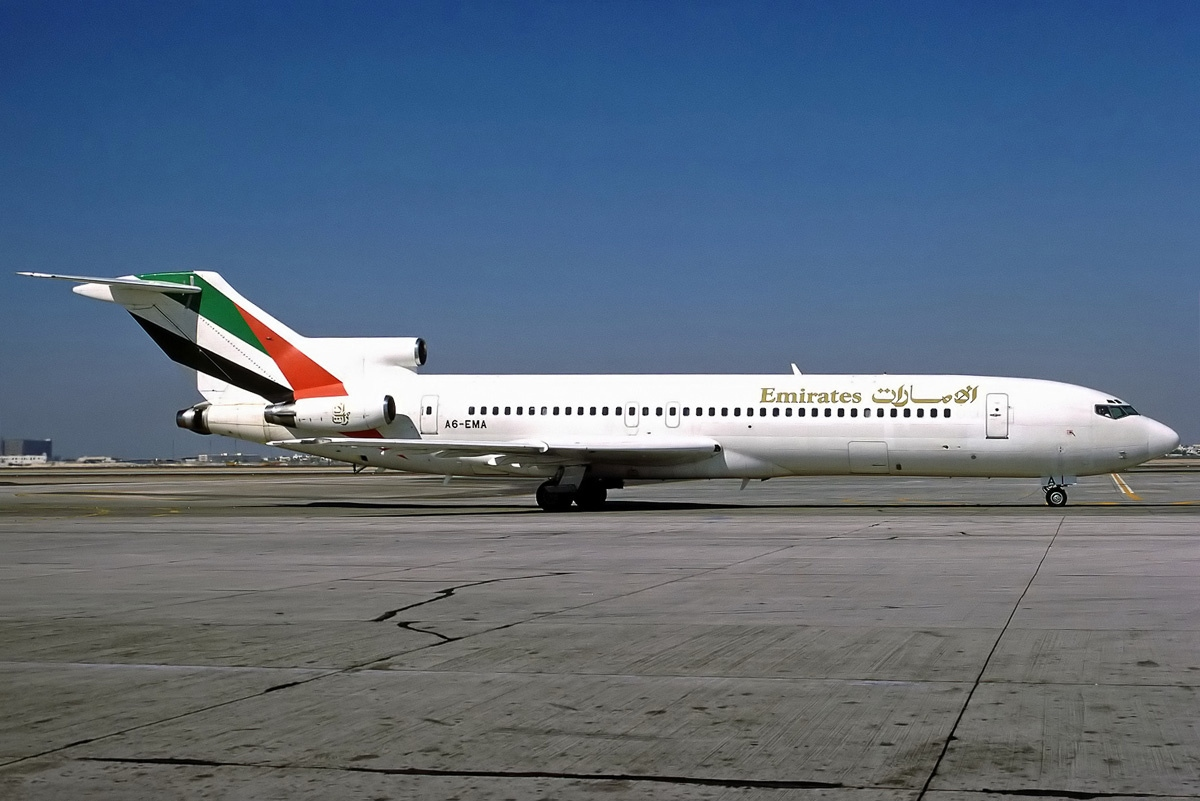
Boeing 727-200 Advanced

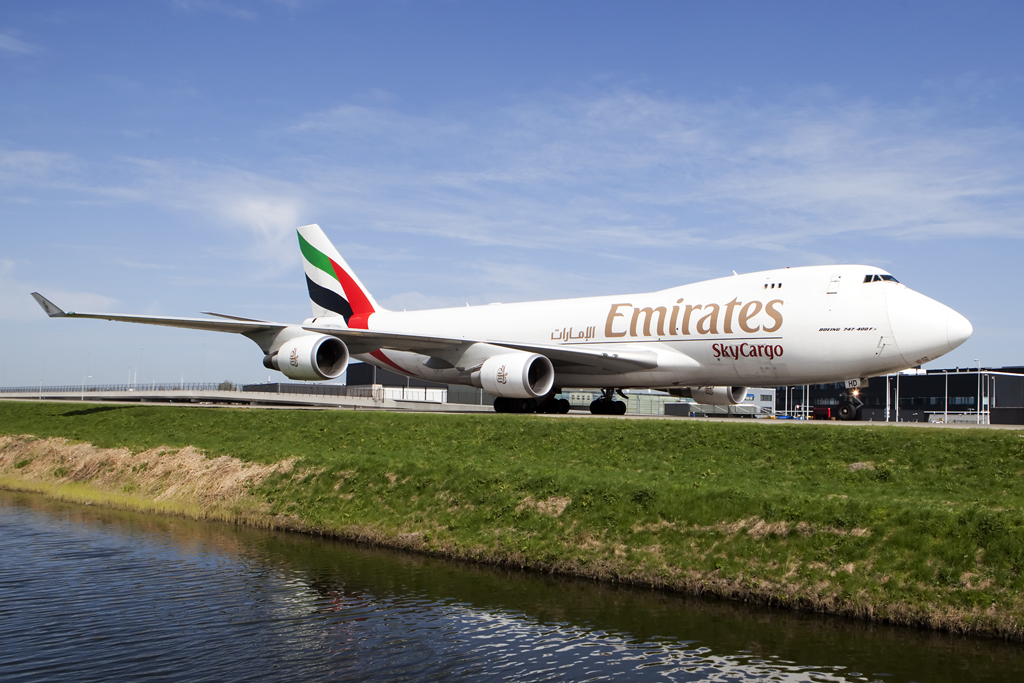
Boeing 747-400F

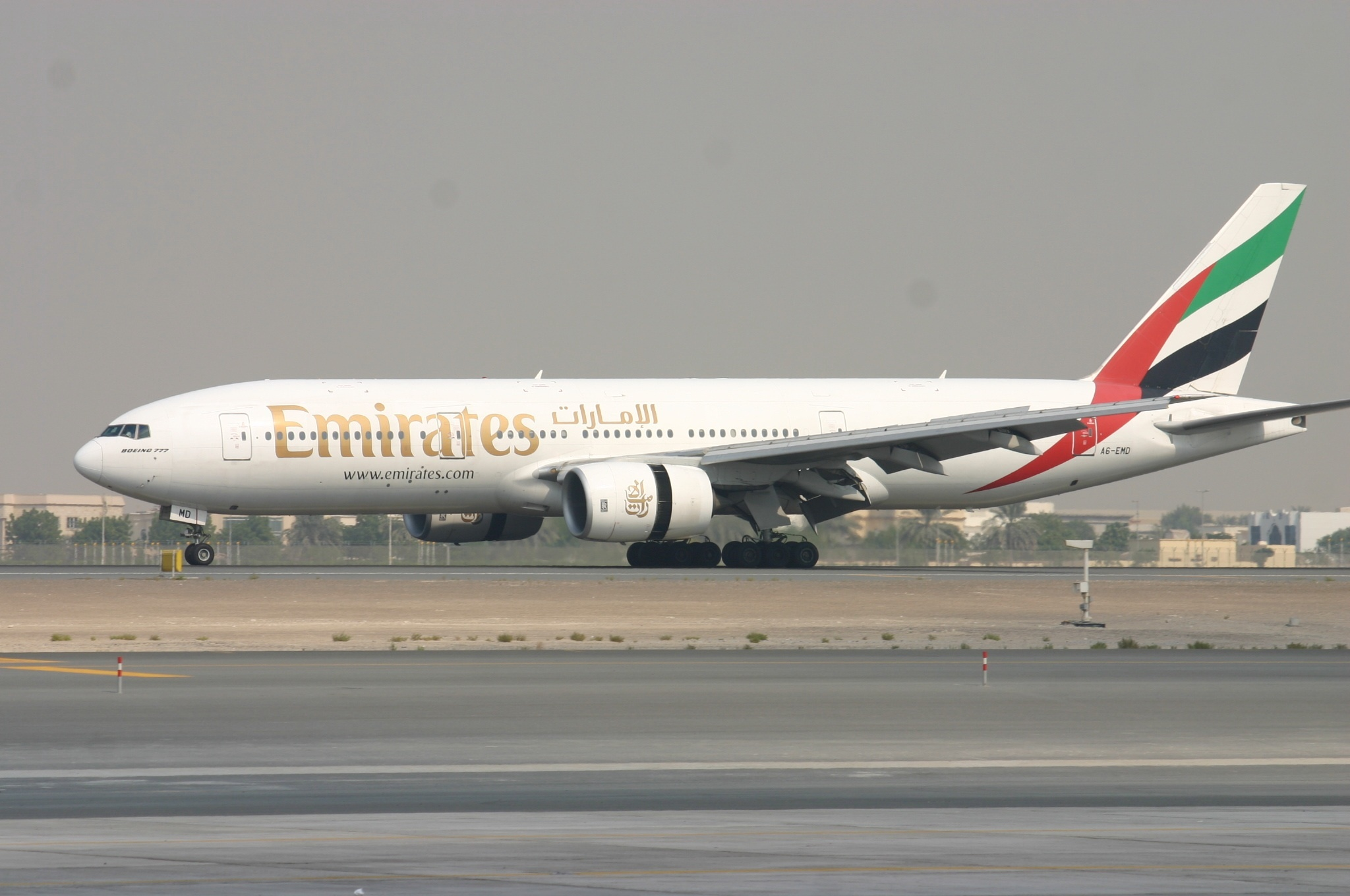
Boeing 777-200

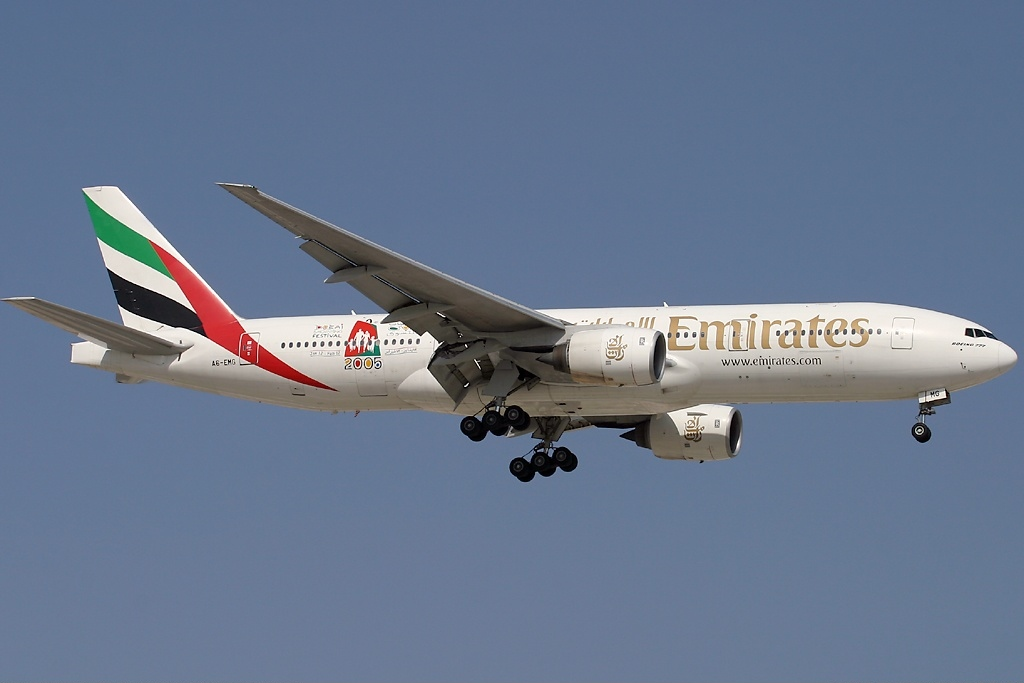
Boeing 777-200ER

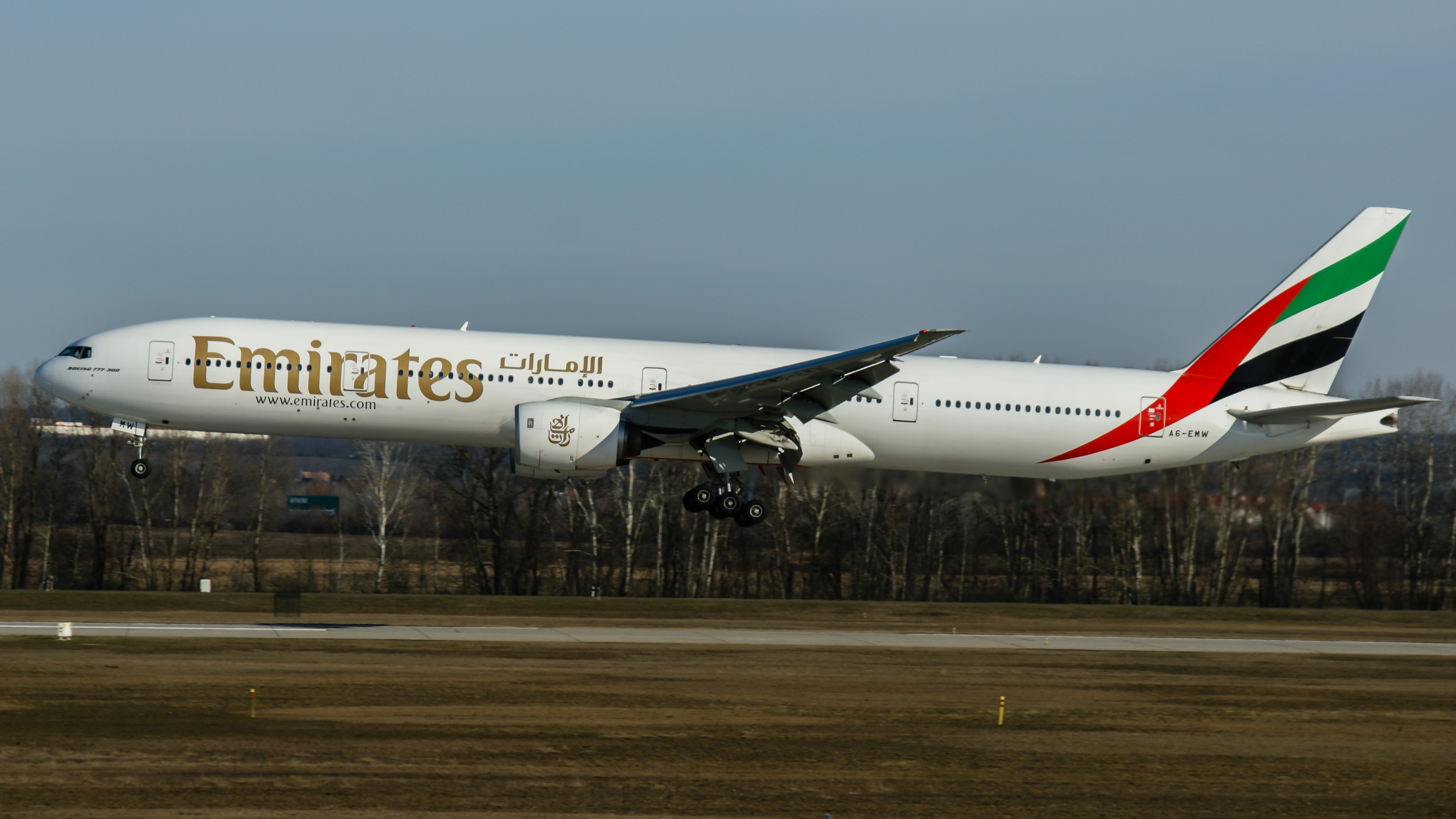
Boeing 777-300. This aircraft, A6-EMW, would later crash as Emirates Flight 521.

Emirates was conceived in March 1985 with backing from Dubai's royal family, whose Dubai Air Wing provided two of the airline's first aircraft, used Boeing 727-200 Advanced aircraft. It also leased a new Boeing 737-300 as well as an Airbus A300B4-200, both from Pakistan International Airlines. Emirates then launched a daily nonstop service to London Gatwick on 6 July 1987 with two new Airbus A310-300s. By 1994, the airline had a fleet of 18 Airbus aircraft. Seven new Boeing 777s worth over US$1 billion were ordered in 1992, which began to arrive in summer 1996.

Emirates' Airbus A300B4-200 fleet was retired from service by the end of 1987. Emirates' Airbus A300-600Rs were retired in 2002 and replaced by Airbus A330-200s. The Boeing 727-200 Advanced aircraft remained in service with the airline for 9 years, and were sold in 1995. The Boeing 737-300 remained in service for 2 years from 1985 to 1987. The last passenger Airbus A310-300 was retired after operating its final flight on 29 July 2007 from Alexandria, Egypt to Dubai, UAE, and was sold to Qatar Amiri Flight in 2008. Emirates SkyCargo Airbus A310-300Fs were retired in 2009. The planned phaseout of Emirates' older large Airbus wide-bodies started in February 2011, starting with the retirement of two Airbus A330-200s from its fleet. The last Airbus A340-500 was withdrawn from service on 31 March 2016 after operating a final flight from Kabul to Dubai.

The first Boeing 777-300ER was withdrawn from use on 27 March 2017 after performing its final flight for Emirates as Flight 724 from Addis Ababa.

In December 2017, Emirates retired the last of the Emirates SkyCargo Boeing 747-400Fs.

Emirates started retiring their Boeing 777-300s in 2016, with the last one being retired on 26 September 2019.

On 29 and 30 October 2016, Emirates retired three aircraft types from its operating fleet, namely the Airbus A330-200, A340-300 and Boeing 777-200ER. This simplification of aircraft reduced the airline's current fleet to just two aircraft families until the addition of the Airbus A350-900 in 2024: the Airbus A380-800, and three models from the Boeing 777 family, the -200LR, -300ER and -F.

Emirates has operated the following aircraft since 1985:

Emirates historical fleet
Aircraft	Fleet	Introduced	Retired	Ref.
Airbus A300B4-200	1	1985	1987	
Boeing 737-300	1	1985	1987	
Boeing 777-200	3	1996	2015	

== Fleet development ==
=== Order history ===
The airline made history at the Paris Air Show in June 2003 when it announced the biggest order ever in civil aviation at that time. The order comprised 71 aircraft list-priced at a combined US$19 billion and included firm purchase orders for 21 Airbus A380-800s and leasing orders for 2 A380-800s and 26 Boeing 777-300ERs. On 16 June 2003, Emirates ordered 41 Airbus aircraft, comprising 2 A340-500s, 18 A340-600s and 21 A380-800s.

On 20 November 2005, Emirates announced firm orders for 42 Boeing 777 aircraft, in a deal worth Dhs 35.7 billion (US$9.7 billion) at list prices. This was the largest-ever order for the Boeing 777 family of aircraft and consisted of 24 Boeing 777-300ERs, 10 Boeing 777-200LRs and 8 Boeing 777F cargo aircraft, with the first aircraft scheduled for delivery in 2007. In addition, Emirates took purchase rights for 20 more 777 aircraft.

The airline converted an order for 2 A380Fs into the passenger version. In place of the 2 A380Fs, during the Farnborough Air Show in July 2006, Emirates signed a Heads of Agreement for 10 Boeing 747-8F aircraft, in a deal worth US$3.3 billion. Emirates chose the Boeing 747-8 "derivative" freighter over the all-new Airbus A380F for its nose-loading capability, something the rival Airbus freighter would have lacked.

On 31 October 2006, Emirates cancelled an order for 20 Airbus A340 aircraft, ending a delay in the delivery of the aircraft pending enhancements.

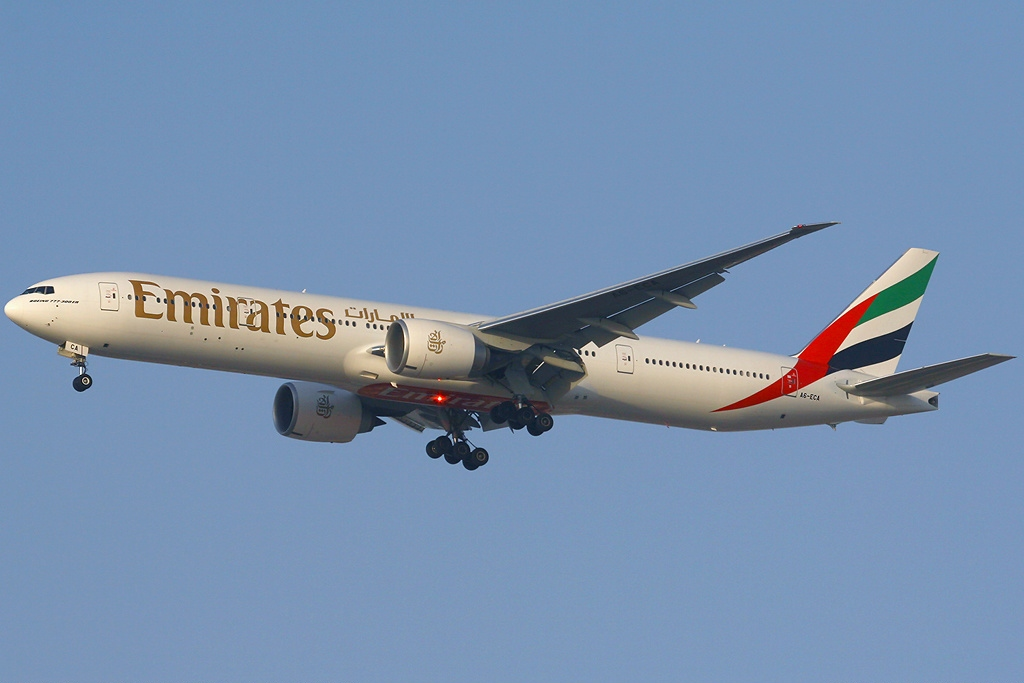
A Boeing 777-300ER (A6-ECA). Emirates is this type's largest operator, with over 100.

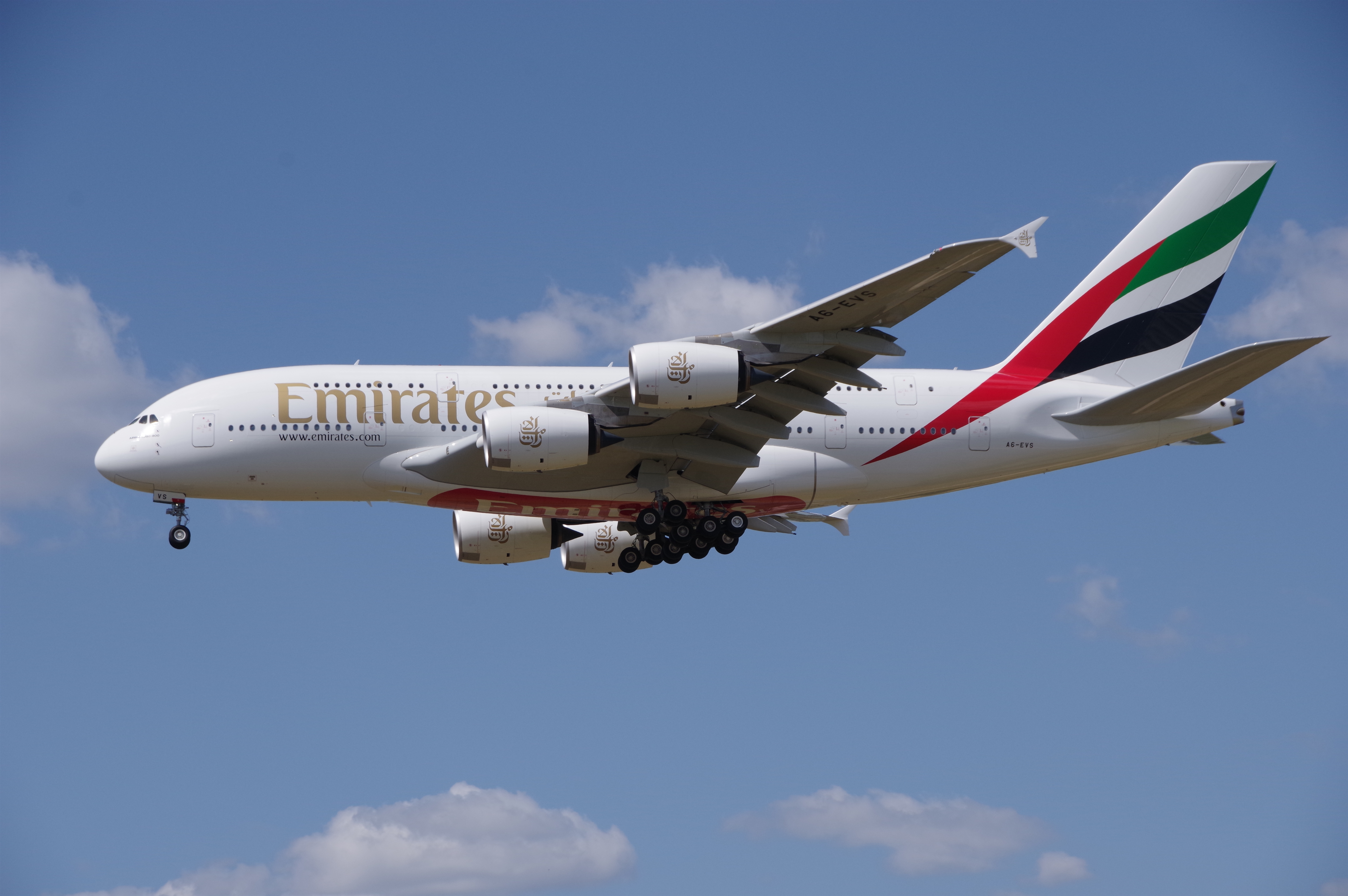
An Airbus A380-800 (A6-EVS). Emirates is this type's largest operator, with over 100.

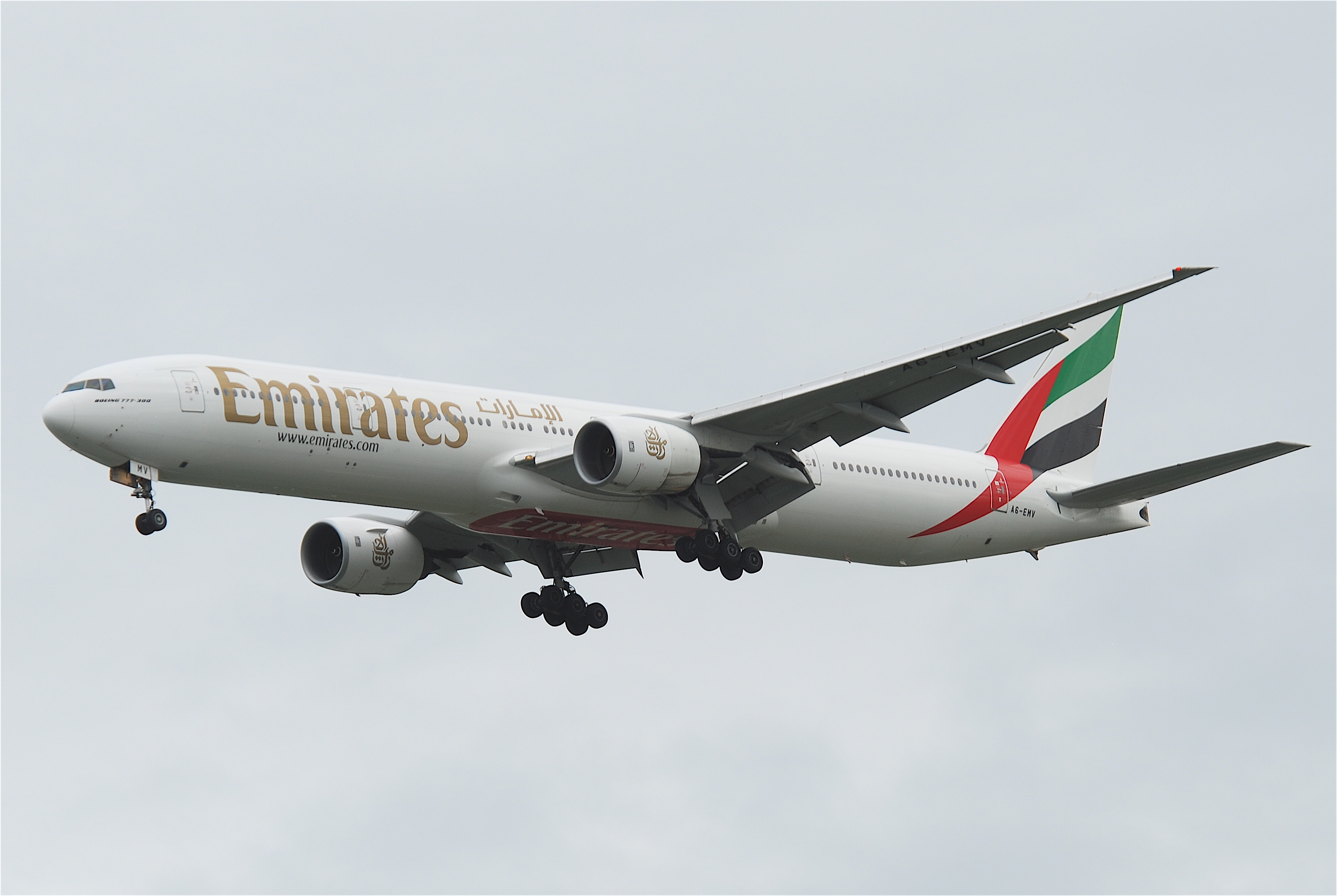
Boeing 777-300

On 7 May 2007, Emirates reaffirmed its order for 43 A380-800s and committed to another 4 which brought its order to 47. On 18 June 2007, during the Paris Air Show, Emirates announced an additional 8 additional A380-800s, bringing its total order to 55.

Emirates, which was deciding between the Boeing 787 Dreamliner and Airbus A350 XWB, also stated it would decide on an order worth as much as US$20 billion for mid-sized aircraft by October 2007, and that the design of Airbus' A350 XWB was closing in on Boeing's 787 Dreamliner. On 11 November 2007, during the Dubai Airshow, Emirates ordered 70 Airbus A350s, with the first delivery set for 2014. A firm $16.1bn order for 50 A350-900s and 20 A350-1000s was made with an option for 50 more aircraft at an additional cost of $11.5bn; the airline planned to use the A350s on its European, African and Asian routes. On the same day, Emirates also firmed up the 8 A380-800s from the June order and ordered 3 more, bringing its total firm orders for the type to 58 aircraft. The airline also ordered 12 Boeing 777-300ERs. In total, the deals were worth an estimated $34.9bn at list prices.

On 28 July 2008, Emirates signed a letter of intent for 60 Airbus aircraft: 30 Airbus A350-1000s and 30 A330-300s. The agreement was signed between Sheikh Ahmed Bin Saeed Al Maktoum, chairman and chief executive of Emirates and Group and Tom Enders, Airbus president and CEO on the occasion of the airline's first A380-800 delivery in Hamburg, Germany. However, in June 2010, the airline confirmed it had decided not to proceed with the order for 30 A330-300s and 30 A350-1000s announced in July 2008, and was in talks with Boeing for a smaller wide-body aircraft.

On 8 June 2010, at the Berlin Airshow, Emirates ordered an additional 32 A380s worth $11.5 billion; this brought the total ordered by the airline to 90. Emirates expected all 90 superjumbos to be delivered by 2017. None of the additional 32 jets were to replace existing A380s; although Emirates received its first A380 in 2008, it did not expect to retire these early airframes before 2020. Later in June 2010, Tim Clark, the president of Emirates, hinted at further orders for A380s.

On 19 July 2010, at the Farnborough Air Show in the UK, Emirates ordered 30 Boeing 777-300ERs worth $9.1 billion.

On 17 November 2013, Emirates announced at a press conference at the Dubai Airshow that it was placing an order for an additional 50 Airbus A380-800s, bringing the overall order total to 140.

On 11 June 2014, Emirates and Airbus announced that Emirates had opted to cancel its orders for 70 A350s.

=== Airbus A380 ===
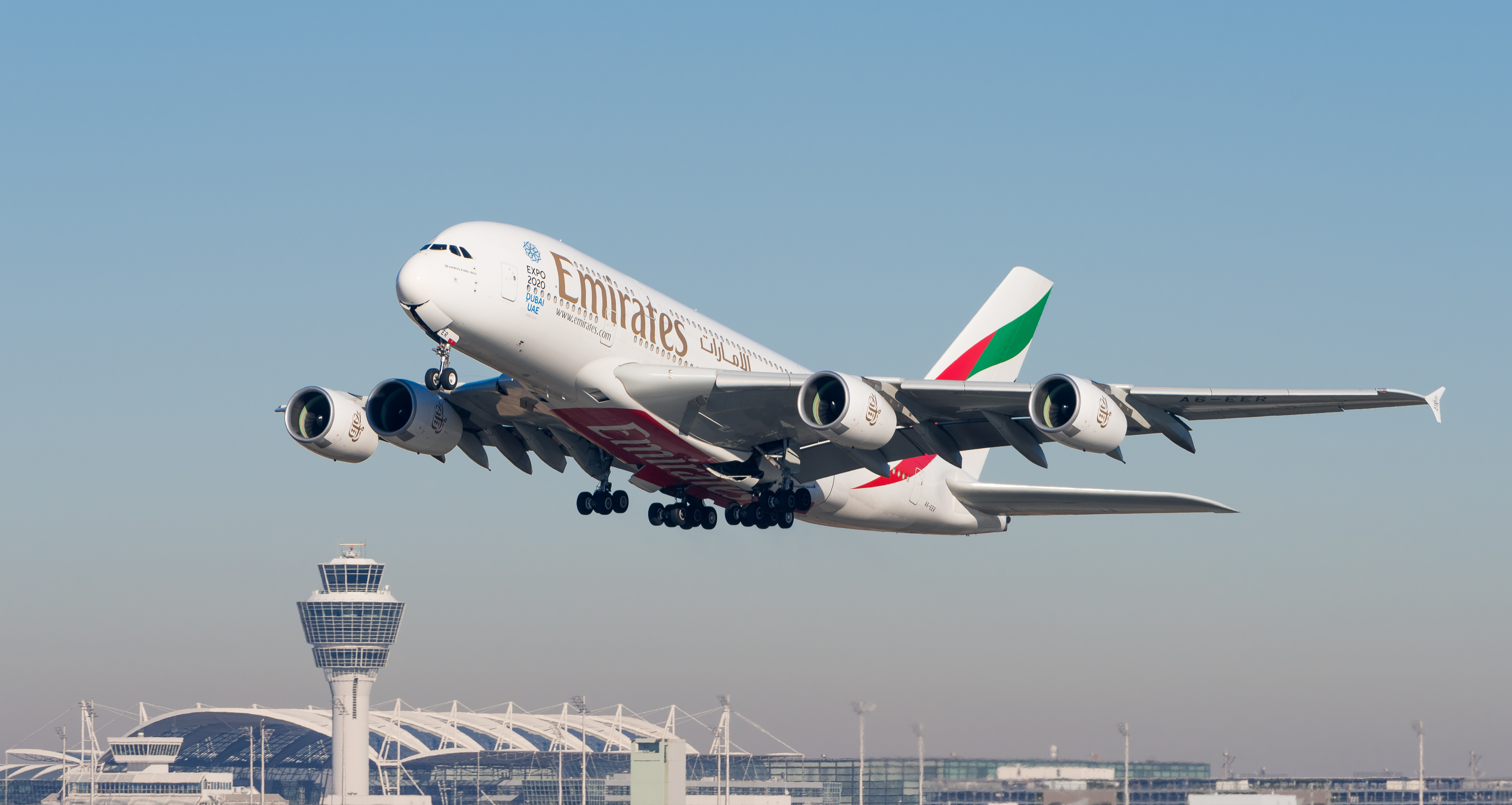
Emirates operates the world's largest fleet of Airbus A380s.

On 28 July 2008, Emirates received its first Airbus A380-800, registered A6-EDA, and in August 2008, it became the second airline to fly the A380-800 after Singapore Airlines. The airline uses its A380-800s for service to over 40 destinations.

Emirates' 100th A380 was delivered in October 2017. Furthermore, the airline had 42 more A380s on order, which would have increased the number of A380s in service to 142. It considered buying an additional 100 to 200 Airbus A380s if the four-engined superjumbo had been revamped with more fuel-efficient engines by 2020.

Emirates' A380s were originally all powered by Engine Alliance GP7200 engines. In a deal worth US$9.2 billion, Rolls-Royce announced in April 2015 that it would supply engines for 50 new Airbus A380s (termed A380CEO), with the first delivery due in mid 2016. On 29 December 2016, the first Emirates Rolls-Royce-powered A380 landed at Dubai Airport.

On 18 January 2018, Emirates signed a memorandum of understanding to acquire additional Airbus A380 aircraft. The commitment was for 20 A380s, with an option for 16 more; deliveries were to start in 2020. The aircraft were valued at US$16 billion.

In February 2019, following a review of its operations, Emirates cancelled most of the A380s it had on order, bringing to 14 the number of Airbus A380s remaining to be delivered to the airline. The first A380 delivered to the airline was one of twelve aircraft delivered on 12-year leases, resulting in the A380 fleet being retired from service from July 2020 onwards, with the last scheduled to be delivered the following year.

As of September 2019, Emirates initiated its A380 retirement plan – which will see the type remain in service until at least 2035 – by retiring two aircraft that were due for a major overhaul, and using them as parts donors for the rest of the fleet. As further aircraft are retired, Emirates-owned airframes will continue to be used for parts, while leased airframes will be returned to their lessors.

On 23 February 2020, Emirates retired its first Airbus A380, registered A6-EDB, after nearly 12 years of service.

=== Boeing 777 ===
Emirates operates the world's largest fleet of Boeing 777s, and plans to start phasing out older first generation "classic" 777s in favour of 150 new 777Xs ordered in June 2014 consisting of 115 777-9s and 35 777-8s with an option for 50 more. In October 2014, Emirates retired its first Boeing 777 after 18 years of service, and the same month took delivery of its 100th Boeing 777-300ER. Emirates retired one 777-300ER in 2017, followed by two more as of May 2018. Emirates received its last 777-300ER on 13 December 2018.

At the 2023 Dubai Airshow, Emirates placed an order for an additional 90 Boeing 777Xs consisting of 35 additional 777-8s and 55 additional 777-9s, exhausting all purchase options, to bring the total on order to 205 aircraft.

At the 2025 Dubai Airshow, Emirates placed a top-up order for an additional 65 Boeing 777-9s, whilst also converting its previous 777-8 order to the larger 777-9s, bringing the total number of 777Xs on order to 270 aircraft consisting of only 777-9s. Delivery of the first 777X to Emirates is expected in 2027.

=== Boeing 787 Dreamliner, Airbus A350 XWB and Airbus A330neo ===
Emirates Chairman and CEO Sheikh Ahmed bin Saeed Al Maktoum said that the carrier would decide between the Boeing 787 Dreamliner and the Airbus A350 XWB as to which type to order by the end of 2017. At the start of the November 2017 Dubai Air Show, Emirates announced a commitment for 40 Boeing 787-10s worth a total of US$15.1 billion at list prices. As Boeing had 171 orders for the variant, these would be delivered from 2018 in two- and three-class cabins for 240 to 300 passengers with conversion rights to the smaller 787-9. However, by early 2019, it was considering cancelling this order in favour of the A350, because engine performance margins were insufficient for the prevailing hot weather conditions in Dubai.

In February 2019, almost 5 years after cancelling orders for 70 Airbus A350s in favour of ordering more A380s, Emirates decided to order Airbus' newest generation wide-body aircraft, namely the Airbus A330neo and Airbus A350-900, and reduce its orders for the Airbus A380. The memorandum of understanding was for 40 A330-900 and 30 A350-900 aircraft worth US$21.4 billion at list prices. The order for 40 Boeing 787s announced in 2017 had not been formalised by the time of the order for the A330neos and A350s, and although Emirates' 2018-2019 results dropped all mention of the 787, the airline subsequently confirmed that discussions regarding the 787 were ongoing.

On 26 November 2019, Emirates, the host carrier of the 2019 Dubai Air Show, made two order announcements for both the Airbus A350 and the Boeing 787. A firm order for 50 A350-900s was announced replacing the earlier memorandum of understanding for 40 A330-900s and 30 A350-900s. The deal was worth US$16 billion at list prices with deliveries set to start in 2023. Emirates also announced a firm order for 30 Boeing 787-9s for US$8.8 billion at list prices with deliveries expected to start in 2023. With this deal, however, Emirates reduced its Boeing 777X order to 126 aircraft from the previous deal of 150 aircraft. In the aftermath of this announcement, some have claimed that the A330neo order had been cancelled, however, Emirates had confirmed that is not the case.

At the 2023 Dubai Airshow, Emirates placed an order for an additional 15 A350-900s, bringing the total on order to 65 aircraft, and converted its order for 30 787-9s to 20 787-8 and 15 787-10 aircraft.

On 25 November 2024, Emirates took its first Airbus A350 following a series of delays. This marks the first time a new aircraft type has entered the fleet since 2008.

At the 2025 Dubai Airshow, Emirates placed a top-up order for an additional eight Airbus A350-900s, bringing the total on order to 60 aircraft with 13 aircraft already delivered.
