= Dorris Haron Kasco =

Ivorian photographer (born 1966)

- Born: 1966 (age 58–59); Daloa, Ivory Coast
- Occupation(s): Photographer, photojournalist, filmmaker

Dorris Haron Kasco (born 1966) is an Ivorian photographer, photojournalist, and filmmaker. Kasco explores the social demons that haunt African cities. His black and white photo book, The Madmen of Abidjan (1994; French: Les fous d'Abidjan), explores the lives of mentally ill people in Abidjan.

== Publications ==
- Kasco, Dorris Haron (1994). Les fous d'Abidjan [The Madmen of Abidjan] (in French). Editions Revue Noire. ISBN 9782909571089.
- Kasco, Dorris Haron (2006). Asfalto [Asphalt] (exposición) (in Spanish). Pamplona, Spain: Ayuntamiento de Pamplona.

== See also ==
- Bouna Medoune Seye
