= Matthews Peak =

Mountain in Antarctica

Matthews Peak (67°40′S 67°47′W) is a prominent peak, rising to 1,100 metres (3,600 ft) northwest of Statham Peak in the southwest part of Perplex Ridge, Pourquoi Pas Island, in Marguerite Bay, Antarctica. It was named by the UK Antarctic Place-Names Committee in 1979 after David W. Matthews, a British Antarctic Survey geologist on Stonington Island, 1965–67, who worked in the area.
