= Guardian Rock =

Antarctic islet in Bigourdan Fjord

- Location within Antarctica

Geography
- Location: Antarctica
- Coordinates: 67°33′S 67°16′W

Administration
- Administered under the Antarctic Treaty System

Demographics
- Population: Uninhabited

Guardian Rock is a low ice-free rock lying in Bigourdan Fjord, 3 kilometres (1.5 nmi) north of Parvenu Point, Pourquoi Pas Island, close off the west coast of the Antarctic Peninsula. It was first surveyed in 1948–49 by the Falkland Islands Dependencies Survey, and so named by them because of the position of this rock which guards the northwest entrance to The Narrows.

== See also ==
- Warden Rock
