= Stride Peak =

Mountain in Antarctica

Stride Peak (67°41′S 67°38′W) is a peak rising to 675 m at the head of Dalgliesh Bay, Pourquoi Pas Island, in Marguerite Bay. Named by United Kingdom Antarctic Place-Names Committee (UK-APC) in 1979 after Geoffrey A. Stride (1927–58), Falkland Islands Dependencies Survey (FIDS) diesel mechanic, Horseshoe Island, 1958, who, with S.E. Black and D. Statham, was lost between Dion Islands and Horseshoe Island in May 1958, in a breakup of the sea ice.
