= Statham Peak =

Mountain in Antarctica

Statham Peak (67°41′S 67°47′W) is a prominent pointed peak rising to 1,170 m at the southwest end of Perplex Ridge, Pourquoi Pas Island, in northeast Marguerite Bay. Named by United Kingdom Antarctic Place-Names Committee (UK-APC) in 1979 after David Statham (1938–58), Falkland Islands Dependencies Survey (FIDS) meteorological assistant, Signy Island, 1957–58, and Horseshoe Island, 1958, who was lost with G.A. Stride and S.E. Black when the sea ice between Horseshoe Island and Dion Islands broke up during a sledge journey, May 1958.
