= Blaiklock Island =

Island in Antarctica

- Location within Antarctic Peninsula

Geography
- Location: Antarctica
- Coordinates: 67°33′S 67°4′W

Administration
- Administered under the Antarctic Treaty System

Demographics
- Population: Uninhabited

Blaiklock Island is a high and rugged, irregular-shaped island 17 kilometres (9 nmi) long, lying between Bigourdan Fjord and Bourgeois Fjord. It is separated from Pourquoi Pas Island by The Narrows and from the west coast of Graham Land by Jones Channel. The feature was partially surveyed in 1936 by the British Graham Land Expedition under Rymill, at which time it was charted as a promontory. It was determined to be an island in 1949 by Kenneth V. Blaiklock, a Falkland Islands Dependencies Survey (FIDS) surveyor for whom it is named.

== Named features ==
Scree Cove is a cove on the southwest side of the island. It was mapped by FIDS from surveys and air photos in 1948–59, and named for the very prominent scree or talus slopes along the southern shore of the cove.

Mount Kershaw sits on the northeast end of the island, above Kosiba Wall and the former Jones Ice Shelf.

== Blaicklock Island Refuge ==
Blaicklock Island Refuge (67°32′43″S 67°11′36″W) is a British Antarctic Survey refuge located on the island. The refuge was inaugurated on 6 March 1957 and remained active until 1958; it was utilized as refuge and advanced base for survey and geological research as well as satellite hut for personnel based at Station E, Station W and Station Y.

The refuge, on 19 May 1995, it was collectively designated as Historic Site or Monument (HSM 63) under the Antarctic Treaty System along with the relatively nearby Base Y, Horseshoe Island. The site was cleaned up in 1997 and has been managed by United Kingdom Antarctic Heritage Trust since 2014.

== See also ==
- List of Antarctic and sub-Antarctic islands
- List of Antarctic field camps
