= Envoy Rock =

Mountain in Antarctica

Envoy Rock (67°51′S 68°42′W) is a rock marking the northern limit of the Dion Islands, off the south end of Adelaide Island which is within the Argentine, British and Chilean Antarctic claims. It was charted by a Royal Navy Hydrographic Survey Unit from HMS Protector in 1963 and so named in association with Emperor Island and names from an emperor's court.
