= Mount Kershaw =

Mountain in Graham Land, Antarctica

Mount Kershaw (67°32′S 66°58′W) is a mountain, 1,180 metres (3,870 ft) high, rising above Jones Ice Shelf and Kosiba Wall in the northeast end of Blaiklock Island, off the west coast of Graham Land, Antarctica. It was named by the UK Antarctic Place-Names Committee after John E.G. Kershaw (1948–1990), a British Antarctic Survey senior pilot, 1974–79, and pilot on the Transglobe Expedition, 1980–82, and other expeditions. He was killed in a flying accident on Jones Ice Shelf, March 5, 1990, and his remains now rest near the foot of this mountain.
