= Courtier Islands =

Small islands and rocks in Marguerite Bay, Antarctic Peninsula

- Location within Antarctica

Geography
- Location: Antarctica
- Coordinates: 67°52′S 68°44′W
- Total islands: ~24

Administration
- Administered under the Antarctic Treaty System

Demographics
- Population: Uninhabited

The Courtier Islands are a group of about 24 small islands and rocks in Marguerite Bay, the highest reaching 30 metres (100 ft), lying close southwest of Emperor Island in the Dion Islands. The Dion Islands were first sighted and roughly mapped in 1909 by the French Antarctic Expedition. The Courtier Islands were visited and surveyed in 1949 by the Falkland Islands Dependencies Survey and so named by the UK Antarctic Place-Names Committee because of their association with Emperor Island.

== See also ==
- List of Antarctic and sub-Antarctic islands
