= Jester Rock =

- Location within Antarctica

Geography
- Location: Antarctica
- Coordinates: 67°52′S 68°42′W

Administration
- Administered under the Antarctic Treaty System

Demographics
- Population: Uninhabited

Jester Rock, also known as Page Rock, is a small isolated rock in Marguerite Bay, Antarctica, lying midway between Emperor Island and the Noble Rocks in the Dion Islands. The Dion Islands were first sighted and roughly charted by the French Antarctic Expedition in 1909. Jester Rock was surveyed in 1948 by the Falkland Islands Dependencies Survey, and so named by the UK Antarctic Place-Names Committee because of its association with Emperor Island.
