= Black Pass =

Antarctic strait

Black Pass (67°40′S 67°34′W) is a pass trending northeast–southwest, 3 nautical miles (6 km) west of Mount Arronax, Pourquoi Pas Island, in northeast Marguerite Bay. It was named by the UK Antarctic Place-Names Committee after Stanley E. Black (1933–58), a Falkland Islands Dependencies Survey meteorological assistant on Signy Island, 1957–58, and on Horseshoe Island, 1958, who, with D. Statham and G. Stride, was lost between the Dion Islands and Horseshoe Island in May 1958, in a breakup of the sea ice.
