= The Narrows (Antarctica) =

Channel between Pourquoi Pas Island and Blaiklock Island in Antarctica

The Narrows (67°36′S 67°12′W) is a narrow channel between Pourquoi Pas Island and Blaiklock Island, connecting Bigourdan Fjord and Bourgeois Fjord off the west coast of Graham Land. It was discovered and given this descriptive name by the British Graham Land Expedition (BGLE), 1934–37, under Rymill.
