= The Witness (newspaper) =

South African newspaper

- Type: Daily newspaper
- Owner: Capital Newspapers
- Publisher: Capital Newspapers
- Editor: Riquadeu Jacobs
- Founded: 1846
- Headquarters: Pietermaritzburg
- Price: R7,30
- ISSN: 1023-5256
- Website: www.witness.co.za

The Witness (previously The Natal Witness) is a daily newspaper published in Pietermaritzburg. It mainly serves readers in Pietermaritzburg, Durban and the inland areas of KwaZulu-Natal, South Africa.

It is the oldest continuously published newspaper in South Africa, having first been published on 27 February 1846. Until 2000, when it became 50 percent owned by the Naspers subsidiary Media24 group, it was the last independently owned mainstream daily newspaper in South Africa. Media24 signed an agreement to buy the remaining 50% shares in the Natal Witness Printing and Publishing company in July 2010.

== History ==
=== The Buchanan years, 1846–1872 ===
The founding editor and first proprietor of the newspaper was David Dale Buchanan, who was born in New Lanark, Scotland on 17 December 1817. In 1829 at age 12 he arrived in Cape Town in the company of his elder brother, William. In Cape Town, he came into contact with men like Thomas Pringle and John Fairbairn who played a prominent role in establishing the freedom of the press during the autocratic governorship of Lord Charles Somerset. Another influence was the missionary Dr John Philip, whose liberal ideas concerning the indigenous people of the Cape Colony had a profound influence on the youthful Buchanan. While still in the Cape he went into partnership with his brother to set up the Cape Town Mail. In January 1846, he disembarked with his family from the Julia in Durban and from there proceeded inland to Pietermaritzburg, which had only three years previously been the capital of a Boer republic.

He seems to have functioned throughout his many years in the colony of Natal as both a lawyer, advocate and the most enduring of the colony's newspapermen. It was this connection with the law which led to the choice of “witness” in the name of the paper. This was further underlined by the paper's masthead which read: “The Whole Truth and Nothing but the Truth”.

At first Buchanan was both editor and proprietor of the paper, but in 1852 the printing was taken over by a company named May and Davis. May seems to have dropped out of the picture and by 1860 the paper was owned by the firm of P. Davis and Son. This marked the beginning of a long period of close association between the paper and the Davis family, of whom the most enduring was Peter Davis Jnr, who took over from his father as chairman in 1873 and continued in this position until his retirement in 1916.

As Buchanan saw himself as a fearless crusader for the truth, the paper's strong views often put it and its editor in opposition to the governing authorities of the nascent colony of Natal and to sections of colonial opinion. In fact, a heated attack on the legal establishment in Natal under John Cloete led to Buchanan's brief, but much-publicised, imprisonment for contempt of court. Buchanan claims to have been imprisoned on two other occasions, but the records are silent on this contention.

Buchanan's combative nature came very much to the fore during the period from 1850 to 1856 when Benjamin Pine was Lieutenant-Governor of Natal. Buchanan despised Pine personally, regarding him as both corrupt and immoral, and kept up a vitriolic attack on the governor, his policies and his supporters.

During Buchanan's editorship the paper was distinguished by its relatively liberal, if paternalistic, attitude towards the black and Indian populations of the colony. He remained a committed supporter of the policies of Theophilus Shepstone, the colony's secretary of native affairs. As Shepstone's locations policy is often seen as a forerunner of apartheid, this has led some commentators to regard Buchanan as something of a reactionary. However, this fails to take into account that for liberals like the editor the locations policy was seen as the only way to ensure that the land rights of tribal people, as well as their customary lifestyle, were protected. Certainly, until the Langalibalele Rebellion of 1873, a committed liberal like Bishop John William Colenso had no problem in supporting Shepstone and his policy. It is therefore not surprising to find that the Witness also supported Colenso during the upheavals caused by the bishop's advanced religious views.

Buchanan fell on hard times during the extremely depressed years of the late 1860s. Around the time he spent more than a year petitioning in France and England on behalf of Cetshwayo and the Basotho people for more equitable terms on the treaty entered by the Basotho. He ended up not being paid for his efforts when Cetshwayo died during the trip and he was punished with non payment by Government officials who he had lambasted for corruption, who blocked payment and got their retribution. This along with failed investments in the economic downturn left him financially weak and he left Pietermaritzburg for the diamond diggings (later Kimberley) in 1872. Here he became very ill as a result of the unsanitary conditions and died most likely of Tuberculosis in September 1874 at his brother's home in Cape Town.

Besides his role as the founder of The Natal Witness, he had played a very active role in the political, civic, educational and religious affairs of Natal and is particularly remembered for having introduced the first postal service between Pietermaritzburg and Durban.

=== The imperial factor, 1873–1887 ===
Buchanan's successor as editor was Ralph Ridley, who edited the paper until his death in June 1875. Unlike Buchanan, Ridley's views on matters relating to the black people of the colony were far less enlightened, and consequently during the Langalibalele Rebellion the paper approved of the strong line taken against the Hlubi, their unfortunate chief Langalibalele and the neighbouring clans.

As an extremely active member of the Natal legislature and a passionate proponent of responsible government, Ridley became the main opponent of the political reforms introduced by Sir Garnet Woleseley to downgrade the Natal legislature in order to pave the way for the implementation of Lord Carnarvon's plan for a confederation of the South African states. Despite suffering from a terminal heart condition, he fought the scheme with all his considerable talents, dying shortly before Wolseley had achieved his ends.

Ridley was followed by a Dr Smith, about whom not much is known.

Smith's successor was Francis Reginald Statham, who had been specially recruited in 1877, by Peter Davis from England. Statham was to serve two terms at the helm of the Witness, his second being marked by major controversy.

The main characteristics of the new editor were his fierce independence and his tendency to side with the underdog. Already in his first term, his support for the independence of the Boers at the time of the annexation of the Transvaal by the British in 1877, and for the Zulus during the Anglo-Zulu War of 1879, demonstrated these characteristics.

Statham left the Witness in late 1879 for Cape Town, to edit the new radically liberal newspaper, the Cape Post. He was succeeded by Alfred Aylward, a colourful Irishman who openly boasted that as a staunch Fenian he had been implicated in the killing of a Manchester policeman – a claim which, like many others made by the larger-than-life Aylward, has not withstood historical scrutiny.

Arriving in Kimberley in the early days of the diamond rush, Aylward initially posed as a medical doctor despite having no training in that field. Thereafter he edited one of the papers on the diamond fields in between serving a jail sentence for attempted murder. He was a leading figure in the so-called Black Flag Rebellion – an abortive attempt to challenge British authority in Kimberley. This was followed by a military career of sorts fighting against the BaPedi, under their leader Sekukuni, on behalf of the unpopular president of the South African Republic (ZAR), Thomas Francois Burgers. Despite his supposed Irish hostility towards the English, he stayed on after the British annexation, before re-emerging in Pietermaritzburg as the editor of The Witness.

It was during Aylward's term as editor that The Witness became a daily paper, and the railway line reached Pietermaritzburg, both in 1880.

The outbreak of the First Anglo-Boer War in December 1880 saw Aylward uncompromisingly on the side of the Boers, and his vocal support of the "enemy" eventually led to his hasty withdrawal from Pietermaritzburg, shortly before the Battle of Majuba. To the disgust of his detractors, he arrived on the battlefield after the humiliating British defeat as an advisor to the Boer Commander Piet Joubert.

After a short break, Statham took up the reins of the paper once again (the Cape Post having foundered). His return coincided with a political brouhaha over the breakdown of the Wolseley settlement in Zululand – which had seen that territory divided up among 13 chieftains – and the restoration of Cetshwayo as a result of the active lobbying of Bishop Colenso and his family.

Colenso soon decided – probably correctly – that the colonial officials were doing all in their power to undermine Cetshwayo and his Usuthu supporters. The bishop soon found a passionate supporter in Statham, who used The Witness and his position as the special correspondent for the London Daily News to attack what he referred to as "the official clique". Unfortunately, in the midst of this struggle on behalf of the embattled chief, the fact that Statham had served a jail term in England for embezzlement came to light and was used by his opponents to discredit him. On top of this a report in The Witness, based on Usuthu sources describing an alleged attack launched by John Shepstone of the Natal Native Affairs Department on the "defenceless" supporters of Cetshwayo at a meeting in Eshowe, led to Statham facing a libel suit brought against him by Shepstone. The matter had still not been fully resolved by the time Statham left The Witness in 1887.

=== Calmer waters, 1888–1903 ===
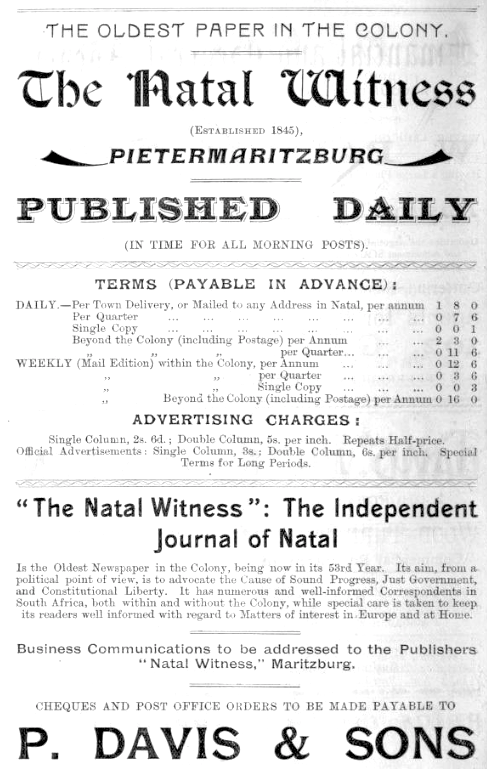
Advertisement for Natal Witness, 1897

From 1888 to 1903, the paper tended to be less radical, although, in terms of South African events, the period was anything but calm – especially as it ended with the South African War, unquestionably the most protracted, expensive and divisive war fought on South African soil.

Two editors dominated the period. The first was Herbert Penderel Longlands, who as the editor of a Kimberley paper had known the flamboyant Aylward. In contrast to the latter, Longlands seems to have been an intensely private man about whom not a great deal is known despite his long association with The Witness, which continued even after he had relinquished control of the paper to the much younger Ernest Thompson. Thompson, who had been born in Pietermaritzburg, was the first editor to have been born in South Africa.

The paper's views under these two editors could be described on the whole as being those held by the bulk of colonial society, particularly when it came to the growing crisis with the Boer Republics, which resulted in the South African War (1899–1902). Certainly there does not seem to have been any of the overt sympathy for the Boer cause that had been such a strong feature of the years of Aylward's editorship.

=== The Rose years, 1904–1925 ===
Horace Rose was to leave an indelible mark on the paper during his long editorship. He had been born in 1874 in Port Alfred, where his father was a Methodist minister. From his pre-teen years he had developed a love for the sort of African adventure novels that made Sir Rider Haggard famous and over the course of his lifetime wrote a large number of novels in the Haggard genre, in addition to publishing two books about his travels in East Africa and Europe. He also wrote the screenplays for two of South Africa's earliest feature films – The Symbol of Sacrifice, about the Anglo-Zulu War of 1879, and The Voice of the Waters.

He began his editorship in somewhat dramatic fashion as a passenger on an Orient Buckboard motorcar, which made the first motor journey between Pietermaritzburg and Durban, an adventure that he described with much relish in the pages of the paper.

The imaginative side of Rose's nature expressed itself early on in The Natal Witness. In 1907, the newspaper started publishing photographs for the first time, and in January 1909 it broke with the other South African papers of that time by abandoning the publication of advertisements on the front page in favour of publishing news and photographs in this prominent position, thereby giving the paper a much more modern appearance than its contemporaries.

If Aylward and Statham had been characterised by their anti-imperialist stance, Rose was something of a British patriot. It is therefore not surprising to find that the paper under Rose took a strong stance against the union of the two British colonies and the two ex-Boer republics, which resulted in the formation of the Union of South Africa in 1910. Rose was particularly concerned that Natal's, and particularly Pietermaritzburg's, interests would be overlooked by the new state. He was also extremely hostile towards General J. B. M. Hertzog, the leader of the political opposition, for what he saw as his anti-British and pro-Afrikaner sentiments.

A pivotal event during Rose's term as editor was the First World War (1914–1918). The Witness reflected both its editor's strongly pro-British stance and the widely held position that this was "the war to end all wars" in its August 1914 headline, which proclaimed “Nations in Arms Together – Great Britain and France face the crisis side by side”. At first it was possible for the paper to carry a photograph of each of the local boys who had signed up and it was only in October 1914 that it carried tidings of the first death of a local in the war – namely that of Lieutenant J. R. Shippey.

By August 1916 the belief that this would be a short and glorious war was long over and the paper's report on the Somme offensive was headlined “Natal's share of the price being paid for freedom”. Casualty list number 56, published in early August, gives 157 deaths, 58 wounded and five missing, in itself a formidable attrition rate if the size of the local population is considered, although it is also necessary to bear in mind that 55 casualty lists had proceeded this one and many more were to follow. This possibly inspired the creation of an Armistice Day editorial by the paper, titled "Make Them Pay."

The retirement in 1916 of Peter Davis and his death in 1919 seem to have signalled the beginning of financial troubles for the Davis family, marked by the selling off of all the family's commercial outlets, leaving only the newspaper and the printing department. Mary Davis ran the company for a while, followed by her son, Philip Davis.

There are various indications that by 1925 the proprietors were no longer happy with Horace Rose and in that year his position as editor was terminated with the payment of a year's salary as severance pay.

=== Riding the economic roller-coaster, 1926–1935 ===
Rose's successor as editor was Desmond Young, later to gain a measure of fame as the author of The Desert Fox, a biography of Field Marshal Erwin Rommel that was turned into a feature film. While liberal in his views on questions of race, Young did not share Rose's passion for all things British and the paper used its influence to try to bring about greater unity between English- and Afrikaans-speakers, characterised by support for a new national flag and a much more accepting attitude towards Hertzog and Afrikaner aspirations. Young remained with the paper until August 1928.

His successor Robert Skelton's tenure ended with his being fired for idleness and financial profligacy in September 1930.

Sidney Barnett Potter followed in 1931. The son of working-class parents in Britain, Potter had become thoroughly immersed in socialist politics in Britain and had in the immediate period before his emigration to South Africa been the editor of The Miner.

Although he seems to have tempered his socialist leanings as editor of the Witness, Potter's interests in matters relating to economics fitted well with the dire economic climate of the Great Depression, which marked much of his time with the paper. He showed considerable prescience in an October 1931 editorial in urging South Africa to abandon the gold standard – a move that was carried out more than a year later and served to stabilise the South African economy.

=== The Cambridge touch, 1936–1945 ===
Editorially the period up to 1945 was to be dominated by two men, both of whom had studied at Cambridge University, George Calpin and Mark Prestwich, the former as editor and the latter mainly as a leader writer. Together, the two took a decidedly liberal line on matters of race, even going so far as to compare the conditions of migrant labourers working for certain Witwatersrand gold mines with those in Nazi concentration camps, an issue, with the Second World War raging, very much on everyone's minds. Indians too received strong support at a time when discriminatory laws were being passed against them.

Calpin's term as editor coincided with a period of extreme financial difficulty for the company that owned The Witness, and after various offers had been considered by the board the majority shareholding was bought by the company's accountant, James Craib, in late 1941. This marked the beginning of the Craib family control which continues to the present day, as Craib's grandson, Stuart Craib, is currently chairman of the Natal Witness Printing and Publishing Company.

Craib was a much more hands-on manager than his predecessor, Philip Davis, and he developed a particular dislike for Calpin. This was reinforced when he discovered that Calpin had been guilty of releasing confidential information about the running of the company and its financial problems to parties who were making bids to buy the ailing enterprise. The discovery of this incriminating material led to Calpin's summary dismissal in September 1943. Calpin's subsequent career seems to have been characterised by misfortune as he ended up serving a term of imprisonment for financial crimes.

Overshadowing the changes taking place in the management of the Witness were the events leading up to the Second World War (1939–45), as well as the sturm und drang of the war itself. Not surprisingly for someone with a Quaker background, Calpin greeted Chamberlain's diplomatic intervention at Munich with enthusiasm, noting in an October 1938 editorial that “the agreement signed in Munich lifts a burden almost too great to be borne by the peoples of the world”.

Although the war seemed to hold out hope of an increased demand for hard news on the part of the local population, this was not immediately apparent as the paper experienced a sharp drop in advertising revenue which led to a decision by the board to cut the salaries of 14 members of the business and editorial staff by 12 percent. Even though this financial shock proved to be temporary, the war brought other challenges for the paper, not least of these being the effects of the U-boat blockade which curtailed the supply of newsprint so that the editions that appeared during the war years were in most cases closely printed in minuscule type on only four pages. Another result of the war was the relatively advanced age of those working for the paper, as most of the younger men had gone off to fight.

Although the casualty rate among locals was lower than for the First World War, the conflict brought other strains as a significant number of South Africans became prisoners of war after the fall of Tobruk. Few families were not directly affected by the world conflict, including that of James Craib, whose sons, Desmond and Alistair, were both combatants. Alistair's fate was particularly poignant as he survived the war only to be killed in an aircraft crash on his way home to South Africa.

Robert Johnston, who had previously worked for the Durban paper, the Natal Mercury, followed him briefly, with Prestwich continuing to play a substantial role as leader writer and part-time editor.

=== Hanging in there, 1946–1961 ===
Although Craib's careful management had rescued The Natal Witness from closure, the period under discussion was marked by a need for great financial prudence and the paper in particular remained in the doldrums.

Another factor was Craib's tendency to quarrel with the editors he appointed. As a result of this, the period was marked by a succession of editors who served for comparatively short periods with protracted gaps in between when the paper tended to operate under the leadership of acting editors. During this period, therefore, the paper was edited by R. W. Talbot, the academic Alan Lennox-Short, later well known to South African radio listeners for his book reviews and expertise in the English language, Raymond O’Shea and Prestwich himself. A long-time Witness staff member, Ronnie Moon, seems to have been called on repeatedly to fill the position of acting editor.

=== The Eldridge years, 1961–1974 ===
By 1961, James Craib was elderly and infirm and the management of the company was increasingly being taken over by his son Desmond. An important consequence of this was that with the appointment of Stan Eldridge as editor, the younger Craib was able to bring some stability to the editorial department.

The new editor was a veteran of the Second World War, during which he had escaped from an Italian prisoner of war camp and worked on a camp newspaper, called Marking Time, with a past editor of the paper Desmond Young. Burly and imposing, Eldridge was a newspaperman to his fingertips and his energetic and, at times, idiosyncratic editorship saw the paper's circulation grow to a point where it was no longer under threat of having to surrender to its competitors.

Politically, The Witness became firmly established as the most liberal of all the province's mainstream papers, going so far as to give overt support to the Progressive Party, which consisted of disillusioned liberal members of the opposition United Party who had broken away in 1959, during the campaign preceding the 1961 elections.

The paper's liberal credentials were to be fiercely challenged by the apartheid government, which acted ruthlessly to crush all extra-parliamentary opposition during what is sometimes referred to in liberation circles as "the silent sixties" – a time when banning orders, imprisonment without trial and other draconian measures silenced most forms of opposition.

Eldridge died of cancer in 1974, while still in office. He left the paper on much more solid ground than it had been at any time since the Second World War. In addition, in 1966 the company had added control of the well-known booksellers and publishers Shuter and Shooter to their newspaper and commercial printing divisions.

=== Steyn takes over, 1974–1990 ===
Richard Steyn took over as editor of the paper shortly after Eldridge's death. Unlike Eldridge, Steyn's earlier career had been in law, and for him editing a newspaper was a new field. Notwithstanding this, he brought considerable energy and courage to his new post and the paper thrived under his control.

From a news point of view, most of Steyn's editorship was marked by a succession of crises in South Africa, starting with the Soweto Uprising of 1976 and continuing through the turbulent 1980s when an increasingly isolated apartheid government faced popular opposition on an unprecedented scale.

Part of the government's attempt to suppress the unrest was a draconian ban on the press publishing news relating to the rising tide of resistance. The new editor refused to be cowed by this curtailment of press freedom and the paper continued to report on the particularly troubled situation in Pietermaritzburg, which from 1987 onwards was plunged into violence that verged on civil war. In fact Steyn's last year as editor coincided with the so-called Seven Days War of 1990, which caused great destruction, loss of life and dislocation in the Edendale valley just outside Pietermaritzburg. As a result of its courageous stand, the paper was regularly in trouble with the authorities.

Steyn's period at The Witness saw two important new moves – the appearance in 1979 of Echo, a supplement for black readers, and the installation of a state-of-the-art new press in 1981, which brought the paper into the computer era for the first time.

Steyn left The Witness in 1990 to take up the position of editor of Johannesburg's Star newspaper.

=== Willers takes over, 1990–1994 ===
Steyn's position as editor was filled by David Willers, who, unlike his predecessor, had acquired considerable journalistic experience, having worked previously for the Cape Times. With his laissez faire, “consensus-seeking” management style, Willers was the complete opposite of Steyn.

Although the country had reaching an important milestone with the unbanning of the liberation movements by president F. W. de Klerk during the Opening of Parliament in February 1990, the situation became if anything more dangerous and chaotic as various forces, freed after years of repression, battled for ascendancy. With civil war threatening on several occasions, the peaceful election of 1994, which heralded an ANC government under Nelson Mandela, was widely seen as something of a miracle.

Possibly because of the extremely edgy nature of the early 1990s, many senior staffers objected to Willers's easygoing management style and this led to internal dissent against the editor in August 1993. The challenge backfired on those who had participated and the ringleaders were compelled to find employment elsewhere. Willers was given the opportunity to restore confidence in his editorship and there were those on the paper who, while recognising the editor's faults in matters of organisation, appreciated the warm, supportive environment he created. Willers resigned from the paper in October 1994 to take up a post in London with the South African Sugar Association.

Willers's term coincided with the succession of a third Craib to the chairmanship of the newly created holding company, The Natal Witness Printing and Publishing Company, in the form of Stuart Craib, Desmond's son.

=== Taking the paper into the 21st century, 1994 to 2010 ===
Willers's successor John Conyngham had worked for the paper since the early 1980s and so was thoroughly familiar with its workings. He retired at the end of March 2010 as editor to take up the post of Group Editorial Director and a position on the board. His 15 years at the helm of the paper were not easy as the traditional press had not only to adapt to a new role in post-1994 South Africa, but also to face the assault of new media, such as the Internet and multi-channel satellite television.

Conyngham's term as editor saw a number of important changes. One of these was the decision by the paper's owners to further unbundle the company, hiving off the commercial printing division as Intrepid Printers. This made it possible in 2000 for the Media24 group – better known as the publisher of Afrikaans-language dailies such as Beeld, Die Burger and Volksblad – to buy a 50 percent stake in the company which publishes The Witness. This led to a much-needed cash injection, making it possible for the company to purchase a substantial new press and relocate from its jumbled offices in Longmarket Street (now Langalibalele Street) to a smart new building at its Willowton premises, where the printing works had been located since 1981. The much increased capacity of the new press has made it possible for the company to print numerous other publications. It also has the advantage of providing abundant colour options, which has translated into The Witness being one of the few papers in the country printed entirely in full colour.

=== Under Fikile-Ntsikelelo Moya 2010 – 2011 ===
In April 2010 the paper welcomed a new editor in Fikile-Ntsikelelo Moya, who had previously worked as editor of the Sowetan in Johannesburg. By incorporating the six publications of the Fever Group, the Witness also acquired community papers on the eastern seaboard. With its long track record of being able to adapt to changing circumstances, there is every sign that the paper will continue to prosper.

=== Under Angela Quintal 2011 – 2013 ===
In November 2011, Angela Quintal took over the reins as editor, previously having worked as editor of The Mercury. The Witness then expanded in KwaZulu-Natal by launching an edition to Durban and Coast in August 2013. A semi-autonomous Durban office was set up in Media House, Durban, to provide more Durban content. The Durban and Pietermaritzburg editions share some content while focussing on their respective local news. Shortly after the launch of the Durban and Coast edition, Quintal resigned to take editorship of the Mail & Guardian newspaper.

=== Under Andrew Trench 2013 – 2014 ===
In November 2013, Andrew Trench become the editor of The Witness after having served as head the Media24 Investigations team and previously, editor of the Daily Dispatch. Since November 2014, Zoubair Ayoob was appointed as the acting editor after Trench's resignation.

=== Under Zoubair Ayoob 2015 - 2020 ===
On 26 March 2015, Ayoob was appointed as the editor. Ayoob started his career in journalism as a junior crime reporter at The Witness in 1996 and had been the paper's deputy editor since 2012. Between 2004 and 2012 he gained experience as a senior reporter, news editor and night editor at The Mercury, before returning to The Witness.

=== Under Stephanie Saville 2020 - 2023 ===
On 1 October 2020 Saville was appointed editor, under editor-in-chief Yves Vanderhaeghen. Vanderhaeghen subsequently retired in 2021. Saville joined The Witness in 2007 as news manager, spending 10 years heading the news desk until she was promoted to deputy editor and then editor. She launched the operations of The Witness as a digital-first product as deputy editor.

=== Current Editor: Riquadeu Jacobs ===
On 1 November 2023 veteran journalist and publisher Riquadeu Jacobs took the helm as editor of The Witness. Jacobs is also the current managing director.

== Distribution areas ==
Distribution
	2008	2013
Eastern Cape		
Free State		
Gauteng		
Kwa-Zulu Natal	Y	Y
Limpopo		
Mpumalanga		
North West		
Northern Cape		
Western Cape		

== Distribution figures ==
Circulation
	Net Sales
Jan – Mar 2015	16 554
Jan – Mar 2014	17 693
Oct – Dec 2012	18 804
Jul – Sep 2012	18 374
Apr – Jun 2012	19 275
Jan – Mar 2012	20 222

== Readership figures ==
Estimated Readership
	AIR
12 Jan – 12 Dec	134 000
11 Jul – 12 Jun	118 000

== See also ==
- List of newspapers in South Africa
