= EKFC =

EKFC may refer to:

- East Keilor Football Club
- East Kilbride F.C.
- Emirates Flight Catering
