= Consul Reef =

Consul Reef (67°54′S 68°42′W) is a line of drying and submerged rocks forming the south end of the Dion Islands, off the south end of Adelaide Island. It was so named by the UK Antarctic Place-Names Committee in 1963; the name extends those in the neighboring islands associated with an emperor's court.
