= Bongrain Point =

Headland in Antarctica

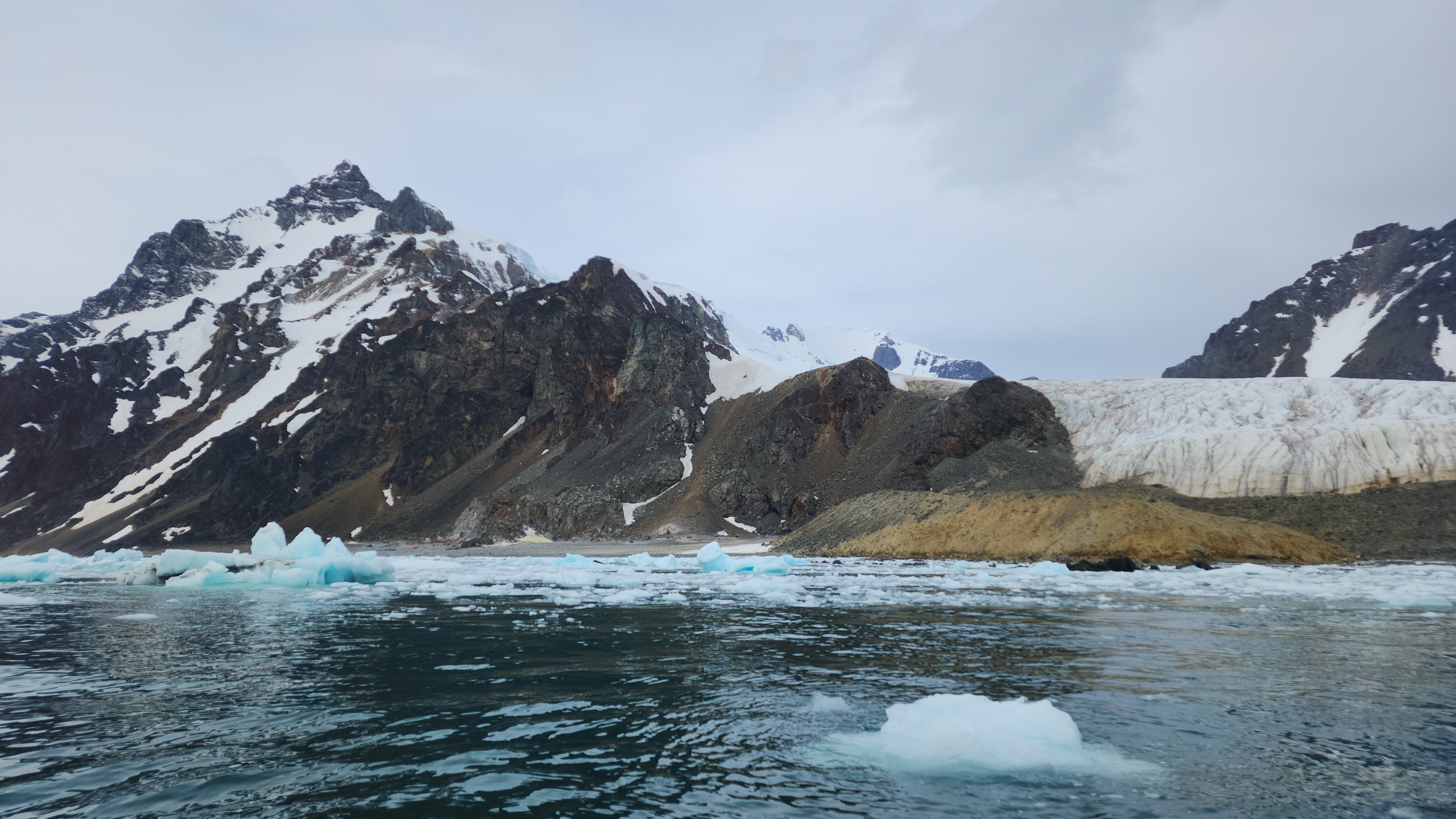
- View of Bongrain Point in Jan. 2026

- Location within Antarctica

Geography
- Location: Antarctica
- Coordinates: 67°43′S 67°48′W

Administration
- Administered under the Antarctic Treaty System

Demographics
- Population: Uninhabited

Bongrain Point (67°43'S, 67°48'W) is a headland which forms the south side of the entrance to Dalgliesh Bay on the west side of Pourquoi Pas Island, off the west coast of Graham Land. It was surveyed in 1936 by the British Graham Land Expedition under John Rymill, and re-surveyed in September 1948 by the Falkland Islands Dependencies Survey from Stonington Island, who named the point for Maurice Bongrain, surveyor and First Officer of the Pourquoi Pas, the ship of the French Antarctic Expedition, 1908–10, who was responsible for the first surveys of the area.

== Wildlife ==
Adélie penguins, skuas, Wilson’s storm petrels, and kelp gulls breed on Bongrain Point. In the 2023-24 breeding season a total of 2,340 Adelie penguin nests were counted, and later in the same season 1,625 chicks.

Furthermore, crabeater and Weddell seals as well as humpback whales and orcas are occasional visitors.
