= Lymm High School =

School in Warrington, Cheshire, England

Coordinates: 53.379°N 2.459°W

Location
- Oughtrington Lane; Lymm, Warrington, WA13 0RB; England

Information
- Type: Academy
- Established: c. 1592; 434 years ago
- Department for Education URN: 138732 Tables
- Ofsted: Reports
- Chairman of Governors: Liz Green
- Headteacher: Gwyn Williams
- Gender: Coeducational
- Age: 11 to 18
- Enrolment: 2000+ pupils on roll
- Houses: Arley, Tatton, Walton, Moreton and Dunham
- Colours: Red, White, Black, Blue, Green, Dark Red, Purple
- Alumni: Old Lymmians
- Website: http://www.lymmhigh.org.uk/

Lymm High School is a comprehensive secondary school and sixth form with academy status, located in Lymm, Warrington, Cheshire.

== History ==
The date the school was founded is unknown, but the earliest known reference to the school is in a church document dated 1592, which mentions the 'Master of Lymm School'. In 1601, it was granted a royal charter and reconstituted as 'Lymm Grammar School' on its Damside site. It remained in this location for several hundred years, occupying some of the buildings which now make up St Mary's Church, until it was forced to sell its land in 1881 after a series of financial difficulties. The land was split into 11 lots, with 5 of them being purchased by G C Dewhurst, who was a member of the board of governors. In February 1882, he informed the board that he would give a different site near Higher Lane for a school and school house and would also pay for a road to be made to the site - Grammar School Road. An appeal was launched to raise the necessary funds for the construction of the buildings and a committee formed to co-ordinate the collection. The new buildings opened on 12 July 1885.

In 1900, a motion was made before the governors council to enable co-education. This was introduced in June 1902, with the first female students starting in the September. The School remained unchanged on its Grammar School Lane site until, in 1945, Headteacher J. R. Canney, advised Cheshire County Council to purchase Oughtrington Hall to be used as an annexe. The hall was used by junior forms from 1945 to 1957, when the whole school was transferred to the site, with the buildings in Grammar School Road becoming the site of the newly formed Lymm Secondary Modern School.

The school became a (Controlled) Grammar School under the changes of an Education Act and Students were admitted to the school without payment of fees. A history of the school was written and published by a history master at the school, Derrick M Kay, in 1960. This was republished in facsimile by former students in 2021. It gave significantly more information than is currently recorded in this summary of the School's pedigree. At a similar time application was made to the College of Heralds and received for the full Coat of Arms. A revision of the School's Blazer Badge and Sixth Form Tie followed. The School was supported throughout by an enthusiastic Parent Teachers Association and Old Pupils Association who raised significant funds which paid for the provision of a swimming pool, a school camp in Anglesey near R.A.F. Valley and many other facilities to improve the life of the students.

The two institutions remained separate until their amalgamation under the Comprehensive system in the early 1980s In the Grammar School Road buildings were sold and demolished to make way for housing.

In the 1990s and early 2000s a development programme saw much of the surrounding farmland being bought for playing fields, and many of the existing playing fields being built on. This programme reached its peak in 2002, with the opening of the new Sixth Form Building (the original Sixth Form Building, from the amalgamation in 1994 until 2002, being sited in the old stable block of the original Oughtrington Hall).

== Location ==
The school is located on Oughtrington Lane, towards the eastern side of Lymm village, adjacent to the village Cricket Club in the grounds of Oughtrington Hall. In addition to the old hall and stables, there are 5 newer buildings (Blocks A, B, D, E, L, N and S) which house the majority of the classrooms and specialist facilities. The Original Sixth Form Block (Block S) contains a large central room known as the hexagon, where the sixth form students gather in their study periods, break and lunch, but can double up as a formal gathering area when required, for both school and non-school purposes.

== Entry ==
Entry is non-selective, and available to all those residing in the catchment area. This currently covers Lymm, Thelwall, High Legh and Statham, as well as parts of Grappenhall, Little Bollington, Dunham Town, and areas of Stockton Heath. In recent years, this area has been dramatically reduced in size in response to the growing number of pupils, leading to an increase in the catchment area for nearby Bridgewater High School.

== Ofsted inspections ==
The school was judged to be judged to be "Good" in a 2024 Ofsted inspection. This was sadly downgraded from an "Outstanding" rating by Ofsted in 2023. However, the Sixth Form was rated "Outstanding" in the 2024 Ofsted inspection.

The old headteacher at Lymm High School, Angela Walsh, (who was banned from teaching and fired in 2016, due to personal usuage of school money) was commended in January 2009 for her 'clear vision' in maintaining the school's excellent standards. She said: "I feel privileged to have joined this exceptional school, and our fantastic inspection results are thanks to the hard work and commitment of students, staff and parents."

== Sport ==
In rugby, the school has won the Daily Mail Vase along with the Under 15's Daily Mail Cup in 2006. In rowing, the school regularly wins head of the river at a number of different regattas.

== Weekend programmes ==
The Manchester Japanese School (マンチェスター日本人補習授業校 Manchesutā Nihonjin Hoshū Jugyō Kō), a weekend Japanese educational programme, is held at the Language Centre at Lymm High School.

== Famous Old Lymmians ==
Notable alumni of the school include:

- Tim Curry - actor
- George Davey Smith, epidemiologist
- Lucy Glover - Olympic Rower
- Richard Egington - Olympic rower
- Neil Fairbrother - cricketer, team captain of Lancashire in 1992–1993
- D. J. Finney - Professor of Statistics, University of Edinburgh
- Maurice Flanagan - founding CEO of the Emirates airline
- Sir David Hopwood - microbiologist and geneticist
- Ruth Lea, Baroness Lea of Lymm - Conservative public policy researcher, Member of House of Lords
- Alex Mitchell - England rugby player
- David Strettle - England rugby player

== See also ==
- List of English and Welsh endowed schools (19th century)
