= Regent Reef =

Area forming northeast limit of Dion Islands

Regent Reef (67°52′S 68°38′W) is an area of submerged and drying rocks forming the northeast limit of the Dion Islands, off the south end of Adelaide Island. Charted by the Royal Navy Hydrographic Survey Unit in 1963. The name given by the United Kingdom Antarctic Place-Names Committee (UK-APC) extends those in the neighboring islands associated with an emperor's court.
