= Dalgliesh Bay =

Bay in Antarctica

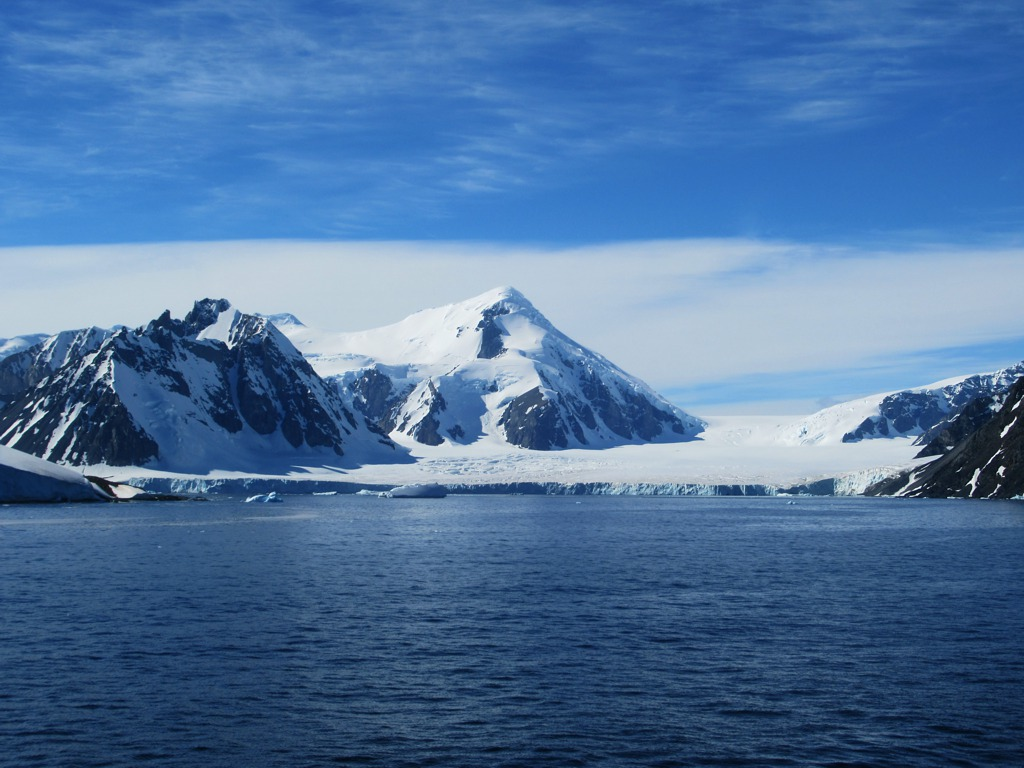
Dalgliesh Bay

Dalgliesh Bay (67°42′S 67°45′W) is a bay, 1 nautical mile (2 km) wide and indenting 3 nautical miles (6 km), lying between Lainez Point and Bongrain Point on the west side of Pourquoi Pas Island, off the west coast of Graham Land. It was first roughly surveyed in 1936 by the British Graham Land Expedition under John Rymill. It was resurveyed in 1948 by the Falkland Islands Dependencies Survey (FIDS) and named for David G. Dalgliesh, FIDS medical officer at Stonington Island in 1948–49, who accompanied the 1948 sledge survey party to this area. Stride Peak rises to 675 m at the head of Dalgliesh Bay.
