= Mount Arronax =

Mountain in Graham Land, Antarctica

- Location within Antarctica

Highest point
- Elevation: 1,585 m (5,200 ft)
- Prominence: 1,000 m (3,300 ft)
- Listing: Ribu
- Coordinates: 67.6667°S 67.3667°W

Geography
- Location: Graham Land, Antarctica

Mount Arronax is an ice-covered, pointed peak in Antarctica.

== Location ==
The peak is located at 1,585 m (5,200 ft) above sea level, 6 nautical miles (11 km) west-southwest of Nautilus Head and dominating the north part of Pourquoi Pas Island, off the west coast of Graham Land. Black Pass runs northeast–southwest, 3 nautical miles (6 km) west of Mount Arronax.

== Climbing history ==
It was first surveyed in 1936 by the British Graham Land Expedition (BGLE) under Rymill. It was resurveyed in 1948 by the Falkland Islands Dependencies Survey (FIDS) and named after Professor Pierre Arronax, the central character in Jules Verne's 1870 novel Twenty Thousand Leagues Under the Seas. A number of features on the island are named for characters in the book.
