= Warden Rock =

Antarctic islet in Bigourdan Fjord

Warden Rock (67°32′S 67°19′W) is a rock lying 2 nautical miles (3.7 km) northwest of Guardian Rock on the north side of Bigourdan Fjord in Graham Land. Mapped by Falkland Islands Dependencies Survey (FIDS) from surveys and air photos, 1946–57, and so named from association with Guardian Rock.

== Sources ==
- John Stewart (1990). "Warden Rock". Antarctica: An Encyclopedia. McFarland & Company. p. 1077.
