= Terminal Island (disambiguation) =

Terminal Island is an island in Los Angeles County, California.

The name may also refer to:

- Terminal Island (Antarctica), an island in Antarctica
- Terminal Island (film), a 1973 American action–drama thriller film
