= Jones Channel =

Channel in the Antarctic Peninsula

Jones Channel (67°30′S 67°0′W) is an ice-filled channel, 8 nautical miles (15 km) long and 1 to 2 nautical miles (2 to 4 km) wide, lying between Blaiklock Island and the south part of Arrowsmith Peninsula and connecting Bourgeois Fjord with the head of Bigourdan Fjord, off the west coast of Graham Land. It was occupied by the Jones Ice Shelf, since the latter's disintegration in 2003 it is free of ice.

The channel was named for Harold D. Jones, a Falkland Islands Dependencies Survey (FIDS) airplane mechanic at Stonington Island, 1947–49, who was a member of the FIDS party which discovered, surveyed, and sledged through it in 1949.
