= Puffball Islands =

Puffball Islands (69°2′S 68°30′W) is a scattered group of small, low, mainly ice-covered islands and rocks which extend about 10 nautical miles (18 km) in a NE-SW direction, lying in southern Marguerite Bay off the west coast of Antarctic Peninsula. The center of the group lies 23 nautical miles (43 km) north-northeast of Cape Jeremy. It was first visited and surveyed in 1948 by the Falkland Islands Dependencies Survey (FIDS). The name, applied by FIDS, derives from association with Mushroom Island which lies 14 nautical miles (26 km) northeast of this group.

== See also ==
- List of Antarctic and sub-Antarctic islands
