= Swash Reef =

Swash Reef (67°34′S 67°33′W) is a reef in the entrance of Bigourdan Fjord, close north of Pourquoi Pas Island, in Graham Land. Mapped by Falkland Islands Dependencies Survey (FIDS) from surveys and air photos, 1956–59, and so named because most of the reef is awash.
