= Emirates subsidiaries =

The airline Emirates has diversified into related industries and sectors, including airport services, event organization, engineering, catering, and tour operator operations (Note: operations). Emirates has four subsidiaries, and its parent company has more than 50.

== Subsidiaries ==
Emirates has over six subsidiaries and associates, which include:

Company	Type	Principal activities	Incorporated in	Group's equity shareholding
Congress Solutions International	Subsidiary	Event organization	United Arab Emirates	100%
Arabian Adventures	Subsidiary	Tour operator	United Arab Emirates	100%
Emirates Tours	Subsidiary	Tour operator	United Arab Emirates	100%
Emirates Holidays	Subsidiary	Tour operator	United Arab Emirates	100%

=== Congress Solutions International ===
The company is a subsidiary of Emirates providing administrative support, managing data, and coordinating third party suppliers such as venues, catering, and accommodation. It deals with conferences and provides support to delegates, as well as providing leisure and recreational activities for visiting delegates.

CSI has hosted large events such as the Global Travel and Tourism Council, which around 1,300 delegates attended. It also hosted on behalf of the World Economic Forum and the government of Dubai, a summit on the Global Agenda attended by 700 business, government and academia representatives.

=== Arabian Adventures ===
Arabian Adventures is a subsidiary of Emirates that organises tours and other tourism activities in the United Arab Emirates, including desert safaris, dhow cruises, Abu Dhabi city tours and visits to theme parks and beaches.

=== Emirates Holidays ===
Emirates Holidays is the tour operating are Emirates. Emirates Holidays triptop destinations are Dubai, Malaysia, USA, EN, Thea Present Maldives any Mauritius.Mauritius

=== Emirates Tours ===
This is the official tour operator of Emirates. It provides holiday packages and special vacation offers to passengers travelling on Emirates.

=== Emirates hotels and resorts ===
As of 1 November 2007, the Emirates Group has launched the first of the Emirates Hotels & Resorts Residences with The Harbour Hotel & Residence. This is a hotel and residential tower located in Dubai Marina. It was the first of six international properties expected to open in 2008.

=== Emirates Destination and Leisure Management ===
Destination and Leisure Management manage the Emirates Group portfolio of hotels, serviced apartments, spas and business conference facilities. The portfolio includes the Emirates Al Maha Desert Resort.
