= Parvenu Point =

Headland in Antarctica

Parvenu Point (67°34′S 67°17′W) is a low but prominent point forming the north extremity of Pourquoi Pas Island, off the west coast of Graham Land. First surveyed in 1936 by the British Graham Land Expedition (BGLE) under Rymill. The point was resurveyed in 1948 by the Falkland Islands Dependencies Survey (FIDS) and found to be more conspicuous from the west than had previously been supposed, its new stature thus suggesting the name.
