= The Emirates Group =

Dubai-based aviation holding company

- Type: State-owned
- Industry: Aviation
- Founded: 1985; 41 years ago
- Headquarters: Emirates Group Headquarters; Dubai International Airport, Garhoud, Dubai, United Arab Emirates
- Area served: 80 countries
- Key people: Sheikh Ahmed bin Saeed Al Maktoum (Founder & CEO); Tim Clark (President)
- Revenue: ▲AED 119.8 billion (2022-23)
- Operating income: ▲AED 14.2 billion (2022-23)
- Net income: ▲AED 10.9 billion (2022-23)
- Total assets: ▼AED 172.1 billion (2022-23)
- Owner: Investment Corporation of Dubai
- Number of employees: 121,223 (2024-25)
- Subsidiaries: dnata; Emirates (airline); Emirates SkyCargo
- Website: theemiratesgroup.com

The Emirates Group (Arabic: مجموعة الإمارات) is a state-owned Dubai-based international aviation holding company headquartered in Garhoud, Dubai, United Arab Emirates, near Dubai International Airport. The Emirates Group comprises Emirates, the largest airline in the Middle East, and dnata, an aviation services company providing ground handling services at 126 airports. Emirates flies to over 150 destinations across 6 continents, operating a fleet of over 250 wide-bodied aircraft. The airline has 170 aircraft on order worth US$58 billion. The Emirates Group has a turnover of approximately US$28.3 billion and employs over 105,000 employees across all its business units and associated firms, making it one of the biggest employers in the Middle East. The company is wholly owned by the Government of Dubai directly under the Investment Corporation of Dubai and as part of Dubai Inc.

== Head office ==
The airline's head office is in the Emirates Group building in Al-Garhoud, Dubai. The building is located on Airport Road, across from the site of the Emirates Engineering Centre built in 2007. A tunnel connects the building to Dubai International Airport. Construction of the building cost AED 700 million (US$191 million). Construction began in 2004 and was scheduled to end in 2007. Emirates self-financed the construction. Over 6,000 employees work in the building. Previously the airline's head office was the Airline Centre along the clock tower Roundabout in Dubai.

== History ==
=== Origins ===
As the British pulled out of Dubai in the late 1950s, Sheikh Saeed bin Maktoum al Maktoum decreed an open seas, open skies, and open trade policy, to develop the country. He also required all government agencies to make a profit. The country was aiming to eliminate its dependence on its finite oil reserves within 50 years.

The Dubai National Air Transport Association (Dnata) was formed in 1959, and by the mid-1980s, it was employing 2,500 employees. It consisted of three business segments: Dnata Airport Operations, Dnata Cargo and Dnata Agencies. In addition to providing support services at Dubai International Airport, the company served as a sales agent for 26 airlines. Dubai had been used as a stopover on routes between Europe and the Far East since the days of Imperial Airways, which landed its flying boats there en route to Australia. The open skies policies kept its airport among the busiest in the Middle East.

During the mid-1980s, Gulf Air began to cut back its services to Dubai. As a result, Emirates was conceived in March 1985 with backing from Dubai's royal family, whose Dubai Royal Air Wing provided two of the airline's first aircraft, used Boeing 727-200/Advs. It was required to operate independently of government subsidies, apart from $10 million in start-up capital. It also leased a new Boeing 737-300 from Pakistan International Airlines which was returned in 1987. Maurice Flanagan was named managing director of the new airline. Formerly of the Royal Air Force, British Airways, and Gulf Air, Flanagan had been seconded to DNATA in 1978 on a two-year assignment as assistant general sales manager. Chairman was Sheikh Ahmed bin Saeed Al Maktoum, nephew of the Ruler of Dubai, became chairman of Department of Civil Aviation and DNATA itself. Tim Clark joined the management team.

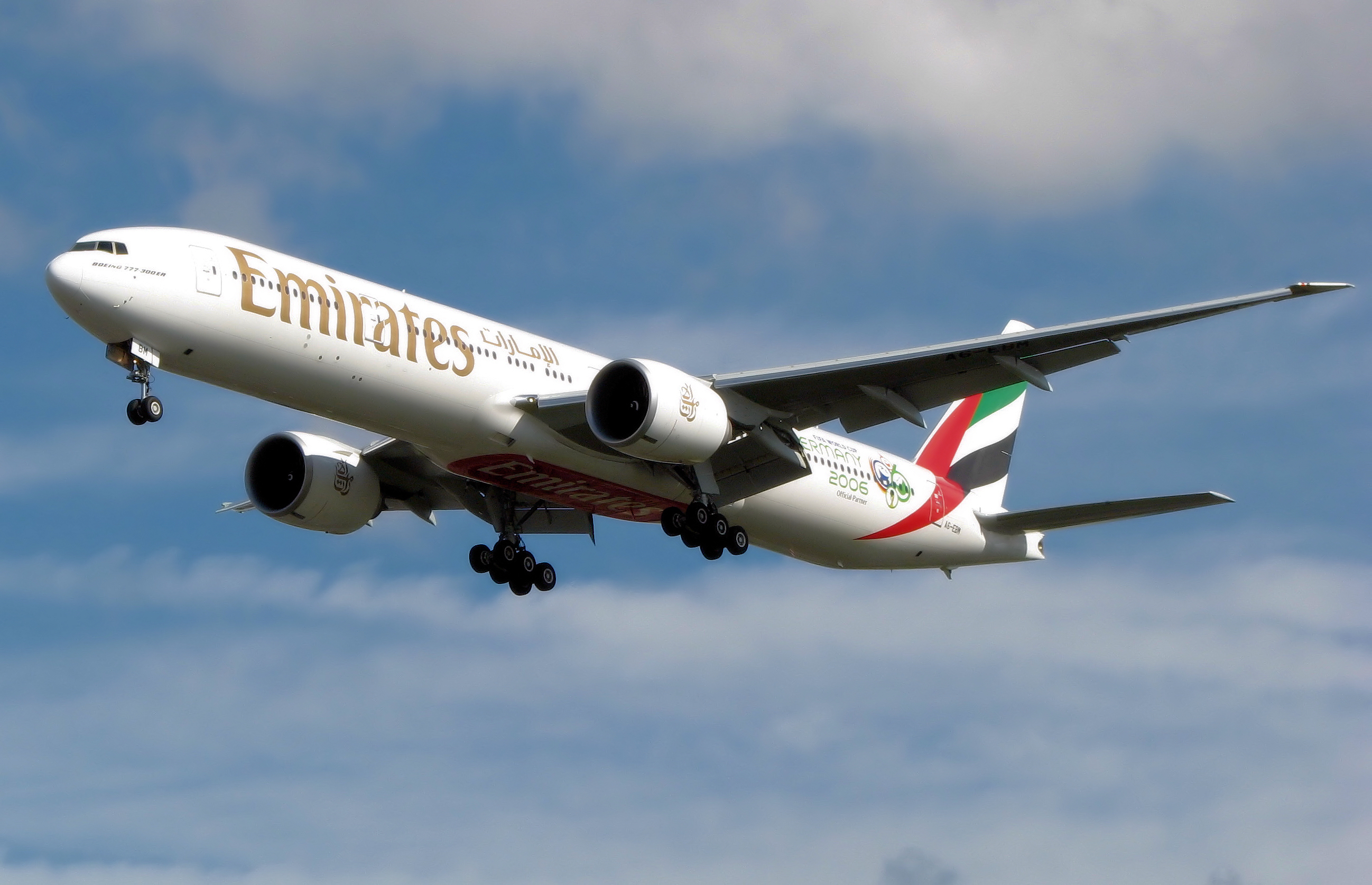
Boeing 777-300ER

The first flight of the airline was, Dubai-Karachi on 25 October 1985. The airline leased an Airbus 300B4-200, from Pakistan International Airlines. Bombay and Delhi were the next destinations for the airline. Sheikh Mohammed bin Rashid al Maktoum later gifted two Boeing 727-200s to the airline.

The Emirates Group became profitable within its first nine months. During its first year, the airline carried about 260,000 passengers and 10,000 tons of freight. By 1986, the airline was adding new destinations such as Colombo, Dhaka, Amman, and Cairo to its route network.

In its second year the group posted a loss, but growth continued even as the region was experiencing a downturn a year later. The Gulf War and the laying off of expatriate workers as the main factors. In its second year, competitors had accused Emirates of starting a price war, something the airline's competitors still accuse Emirates of doing. On 3 July 1987, Emirates received its first bought Airbus A310-304, from Toulouse. Within the first 38 months of operating, Emirates was serving 12 destinations.

Emirates Sky Cargo, which operated as a separate entity, carried 25,000 tons of freight in fiscal 1989. Emirates expanded its route network into the Far East in 1990, and expanded its European operations in the summer of 1992. In 1990, the airline purchased three additional Airbus A310-300s from Airbus. The group also launched Marhaba in December 1991 as a premium meet and greet service for passengers travelling through Dubai International Airport.

=== Growth ===
By the early 1990s, Emirates had become one of the fastest growing airlines globally. Its annual revenues increased by approximately $100 million, reaching around $500 million in 1993. That year, the airline transported 68,000 tons of cargo and 1.6 million passengers.

The Gulf War had a significant impact on the regional aviation industry. During the final days of the conflict, Emirates was the only airline to continue operations, although its fleet was grounded temporarily in the winter of 1991 during the liberation of Kuwait. Services resumed a few weeks later.

In 1993, Emirates expanded its fleet with the addition of another Airbus A300-600R, bringing the total number of aircraft to nine. The same year, the airline placed an order for seven Boeing 777s, with an option for seven more, in a deal valued at approximately US$645.5 million. At its sixth anniversary, Emirates was transporting about 25,000 passengers weekly to 23 destinations. In 1994, it opened a new terminal at Dubai Airport, constructed at a cost of US$2 million.

Emirates also expanded its international presence through partnerships. In late 1993, it entered into an agreement with US Airways to broaden its service network. Prior to this, it had cooperative arrangements with Cyprus Airways. By 1994, Emirates operated 15 aircraft and served 32 destinations, ranking as the sixth largest airline in the Middle East at that time.

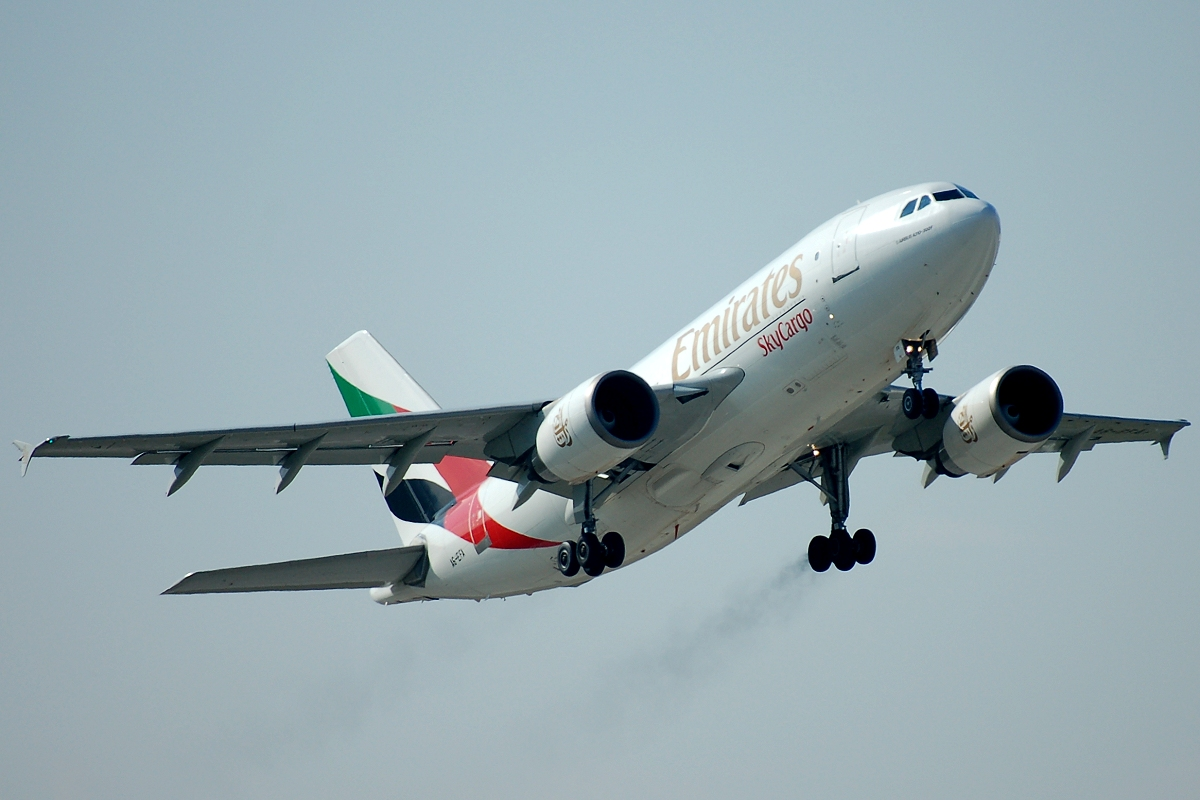
Emirates SkyCargo Airbus A310

Emirates took in revenues of $643.4 million in the year ending 30 March 1994. The airline had 4,000 employees and carried two million passengers a year between 34 destinations with a fleet of 18 Airbus aircraft. In spite of the large capital expenditures, the Dubai government had laid out only $50 million since the airline's inception. In October 1995, the Emirates Group launched Mercator an IT company.

A total of 92 air carriers were flying to Dubai Airport and Emirates faced intense competition at its home base. It carried about three million passengers a year to Dubai in the mid-1990s. Emirates continued to expand during the late 1990s. The growing cargo business accounted for 16 percent of the airline's total revenues. By 1995, it has a fleet flying to 34 locations in the Middle East, Far East and Europe. Emirates also opened its own Flight Training Centre in 1995, and in 2017, its own Flight Training Academy.

In 1997, Emirates was flying a dedicated freighter to Amsterdam, a point not on its network of passenger routes, in cooperation with KLM. It carried about three million passengers during the year. The same year, Emirates made a $2 billion order for 16 Airbus Airbus A330-200s, and carried over three million passengers and 150,000 tonnes of cargo. The airline also took delivery of six Boeing 777-200s, giving it new long-haul capabilities.

Emirates opened a, $65 million training center in January 1997. The airline was then able to provide simulator training for its crew members and flight and maintenance personnel. A record group profit of AED 371 million was achieved in 1997–98. Emirates executives planned a slowdown in the airline's growth in the late 1990s to stabilize its expansive route network.

In May 1998, Emirates paid the Government of Sri Lanka $70 million for a 40 percent stake in SriLankan Airlines. As part of the deal, Emirates received a 10-year contract to manage SriLankan. In January 2008, Emirates announced that it would give back management of SriLankan Airlines to the Government of Sri Lanka, effective April 2008. Emirates sold its stake in SriLankan Airlines to the Government of Sri Lanka during June 2010.

In 1998, the airline opened a $540 million Terminal 2 at Dubai International Airport, increasing its capacity by 26 percent as passenger figures hit 3.7 million, while cargo levels went up to 200,000 tonnes. Galileo Emirates (now known as Emquest), was established to consolidate the distribution of the Galileo Reservation System in the existing markets of the UAE, Oman, Bahrain, Qatar, Pakistan and Sri Lanka.

In 1999, Emirates opened its own hotel – The Al Dossa Desert Resort. Emirates Group's workforce totalled 11,000 that year, and Dnata entered the South-East Asian airport services market with the launch of Dnata Philippines Emirates SkyCargo also launched a new system called Skychain developed by Mercator, which provided access via the Internet and email to everyone involved in moving a cargo.

=== Modern history ===
Emirates announced an order in April 2000 as the first launch customer for the Airbus A3XX (later named Airbus A380), the largest civil aircraft ever built. The deal comprised five Airbus A380-800s and two Airbus A380-800F. The deal was confirmed on 4 November 2001 and Emirates announced orders for 15 more A380-800s at the same time. Also announced was an order for 6 Boeing 777s. Emirates justified its order by saying that purchasing the 481- to 656-passenger super jumbo to was to maximize its use of scarce takeoff and landing slots at crowded airports like London Heathrow. In the same year the new Sheikh Rashid Terminal opened, increasing the capacity at Dubai International to 22 million passengers a year. The loyalty program of Emirates, Skywards was also launched. Sheikh Ahmed also announced that Dubai Government is to invest $500–600m in the new Terminal 3 – with a capacity for 20 million passengers a year.

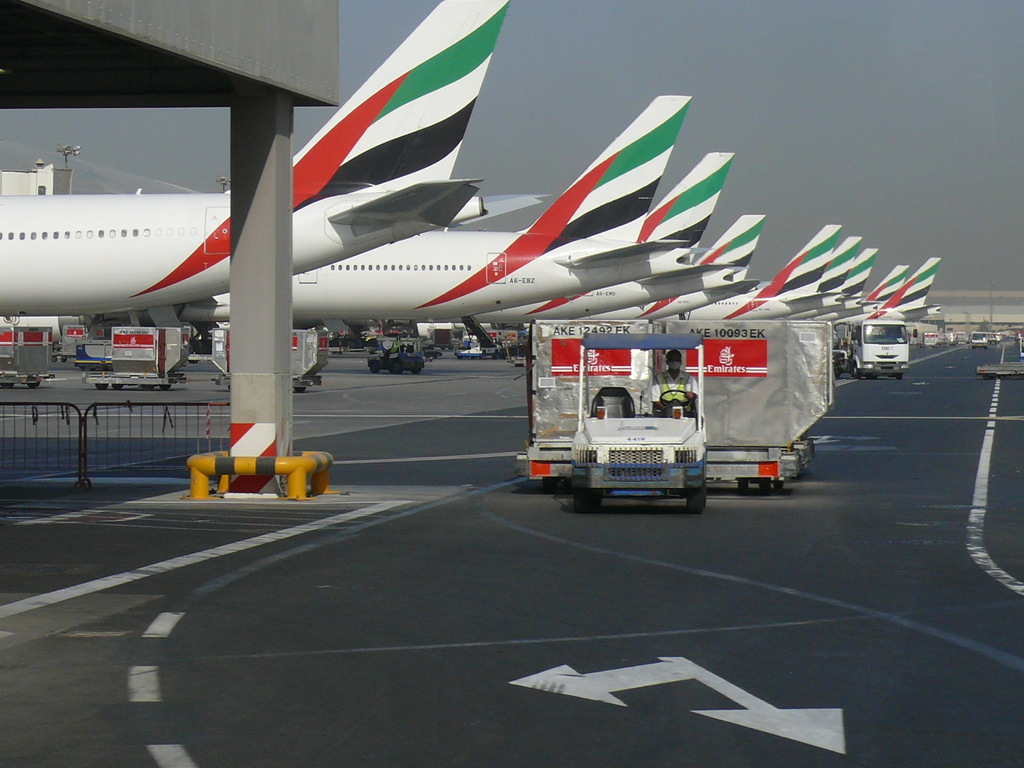
Emirates flights dominate traffic at Dubai International Airport

Towards the end of 2000, Emirates was planning to start ultra-long-haul service to the East Coast and West Coast of the United States as well as nonstop flights to Australia and Argentina. Traffic continued to grow at a rate of 20 percent in 1999–2000.

In 2001, Emirates SkyCargo Centre opened with a capacity to handle 400,000 tonnes a year. Emirates was also voted airline of the year by research consultancy Skytrax. Emirates took delivery of its 18th Airbus A330-200 and ordered two more, making it the biggest A330 operator in the world. The airline also announced an order worth $15 billion for 15 Airbus A380s, eight Airbus A340-600s, three Airbus A330s and 25 Boeing 777s. A year later, the airline was again named airline of the year by Skytrax. Passenger level on Emirates in the 2001–02 financial year reached 6.3 million passengers, and cargo crossed 400,000 tonnes. The Group also announced a $275 million investment in new hangar complex at the Emirates Engineering Centre. Galileo Emirates was further expanded when the business acquired the distribution rights for Sudan and Tunisia.

In early 2003, the Emirates flight catering was formed out of Emirates Abela Catering Company. Emirates flight catering employed over 5,400 staff. In its first year, the catering company produced over 16 million meals with a daily average of 45,000 meals. In the end of 2003, Emirates ordered 71 aircraft at a cost of $19 billion.

In the financial year ending March 2003, Emirates carried 8.5 million passengers, an increase of 26%, and the airline posted an increase in profits of 94 per cent to Dhs907 million from Dhs468 million from the previous year. Dnata also launched its services in Kuwait.

In 2004, Emirates ordered four Boeing 777-300ERs, with nine options, in a $2.96 billion deal. The SkyCargo fleet is increased with three Airbus A310-300s added to its six Boeing 747s. Emirates also signed a £100 million deal with English Premiership side Arsenal, which included the naming rights to its new stadium for 15 years and shirt sponsorship for eight years, starting from the 2006/07 season. By the end of 2003, Dnata began operations in Kuwait.

In 2005, the Emirates Group workforce totaled 25,000, making it Dubai's largest employer. Passenger traffic also continued to rise with 12.5 million recorded that year. Emirates ordered 42 Boeing 777s in a deal worth $9.7 billion, the largest Boeing 777 order in history at the Dubai Airshow in 2005. In April 2005, Dnata started operations in Saudi Arabia. In June, Dnata bought over Changi International Airport Services, with Temasek Holdings retaining shareholding. In July, Emirates flight catering began operations at its new food point facility – a 10,000 square metre facility capable of producing 30 million meals annually.

In early 2006, Emirates flight catering began operations at its new $120 million catering facility dedicated to service Emirates flights. The facility had the capacity of producing over 115,00 meals daily. Also, in 2006, Emirates flight catering opened its linecraft laundering plant. The facility has a total area of 10,500 m^{2}, and a capacity to handle 50 tonnes of laundry and dry cleaning output per day. At the Farnborough Air Show in 2006, Emirates signed an agreement for 10 Boeing 747-8F in a deal worth $3.3 billion, and in 2007 Emirates signs contracts for 120 Airbus A350s, 11 Airbus A380s and 12 Boeing 777-300ERs, worth an estimated $34.9 billion, at the Dubai Air Show. The New Engineering Centre and Engine Test Cell are officially opened and the Emirates Harbour Hotel & Residence and the Marina Hotel open their doors. In September, the group also buys a 49% stake in UK based Alpha Group. Also in 2007, Dnata signed a 15-year joint venture agreement with China West Airport Group to provide airport ground handling services in Xi'an Xianyang International Airport. Dnata will also participate in operations at 10 other airports managed by CWAG. Under the agreement signed, Dnata will hold a 45 per cent stake in Xi'an Dnata Aviation Services Company Limited, with the remaining 55 per cent owned by CWAG. Also, at the end of 2007, Dnata opened offices in Qatar.

In 2008, the Emirates Group moved into its new headquarters in Dubai. Emirates SkyCargo also began operations out of Dubai Cargo Village's new Mega Terminal, with a capacity to handle 1.2 million tonnes annually. In June, Dnata acquired a 19.99 percent stake in its partner Hogg Robinson Group, becoming the largest shareholder in the company. In August Emirates took delivery of three A380s and the first Emirates A380 touched down in New York in August. Emirates also received its 10,000th cabin crew member. In September, Sabre Holdings signed a 10-year agreement with EmQuest to distribute services in Africa. In October the Emirates dedicated Terminal 3 opened with a capacity of over 27 million passengers, the terminal is the largest terminal in the world.

In 2013, EmQuest signed an agreement with Contac Services Inc. to launch the mywurld platform in the Middle East and Africa.

== Corporate management ==
The Emirates Group is a subsidiary of the Dubai government investment company, Investment Corporation of Dubai. The group has recorded a profit every year, except the second, and growth has never fallen below 20% a year. In its first 11 years, it doubled in size every 3.5 years, and has every four years since.

In 2008, Emirates paid dividends worth US$776 million to the Government of Dubai. The government has received Dhs3.1 billion from Emirates since dividends started being paid in 1999 for having provided an initial start-up capital of US$10m and an additional investment of circa US$80m at the time of the airline's inception. The Dubai government is the sole owner of the company. However, it does not put any new money into it, nor does it interfere with running the airline.

=== Structure and employment ===
Emirates has diversified into related industries and sectors, including airport services, engineering, event organization, catering, and tour operator operations. Emirates has 4 subsidiaries and its parent company has more than 50.

On 31 March 2020, at the end of the fiscal year, Emirates employed a total of 59,519 staff of which 21,789 were cabin crew, 4,313 were flight deck crew, 3,316 were in engineering, 12,627 were listed as other, 5,376 employees were at overseas stations and 12,098 were at subsidiary companies.

== Subsidiaries ==
=== Air transport ===
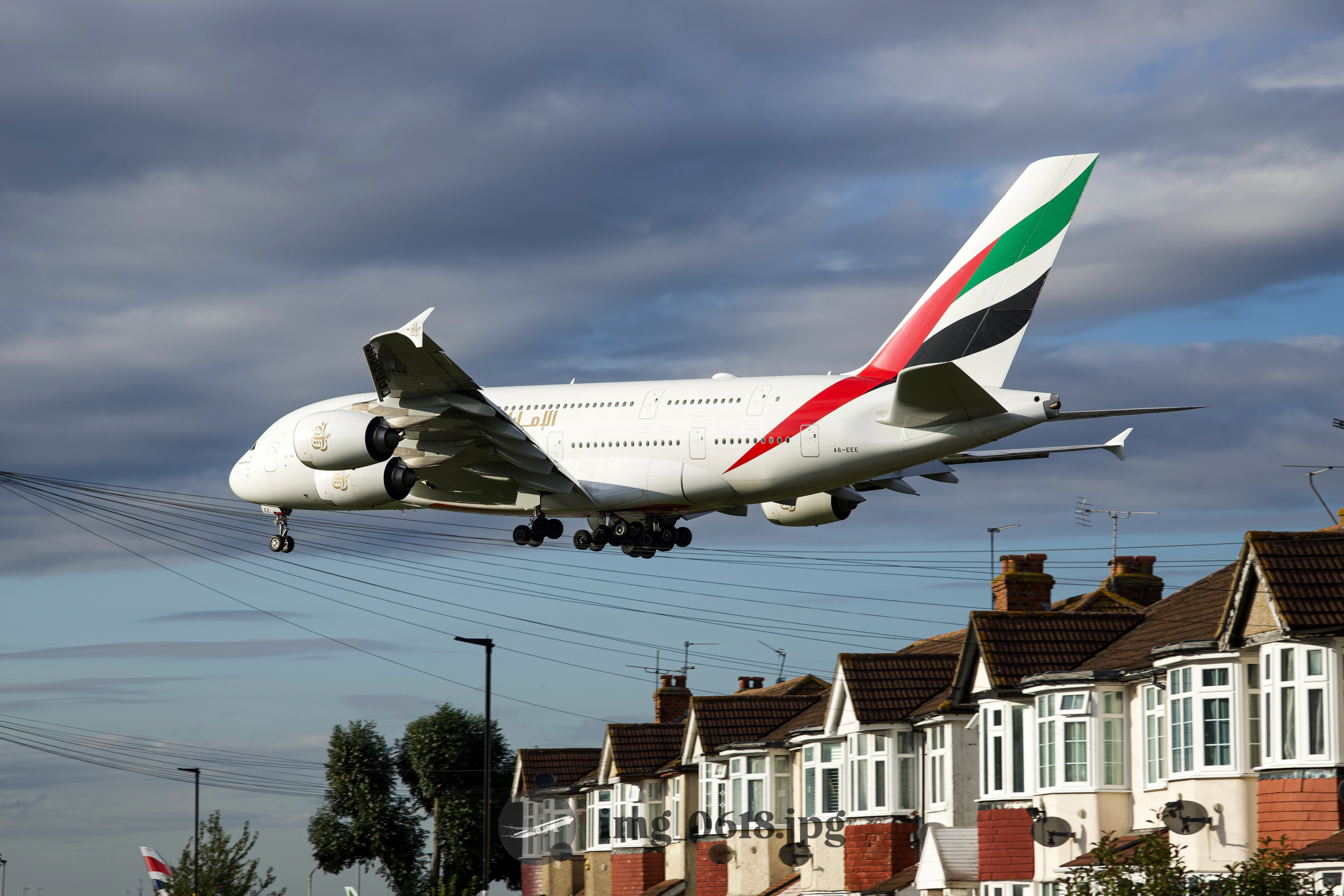
Emirates Airbus A380 on approach to Heathrow Airport

==== Emirates airline ====
Emirates is a subsidiary of The Emirates Group, and a major airline in the Middle East. It is the national airline of Dubai, United Arab Emirates and operates over 1,990 passenger flights per week, from its hub at Dubai International Airport, to over 101 destinations in 61 countries across six continents. Emirates was established in 1985 with one Boeing 727 and one Airbus A300. The Emirates fleet was now 10 Boeing 777-200LR, 125 Boeing 777-300ER, and 117 Airbus A380 aircraft.

In the financial year 2008–09 passenger numbers reached 22.7 million, representing an increase of 7.1% over the previous year.

The airline's profits however were down 72% for the 2008/09 fiscal year. Its profit of 1.49bn dirhams ($406m; £255m) for the year to 31 March 2009 compared with a 5.3bn dirham profit for the previous year.

==== Emirates SkyCargo ====
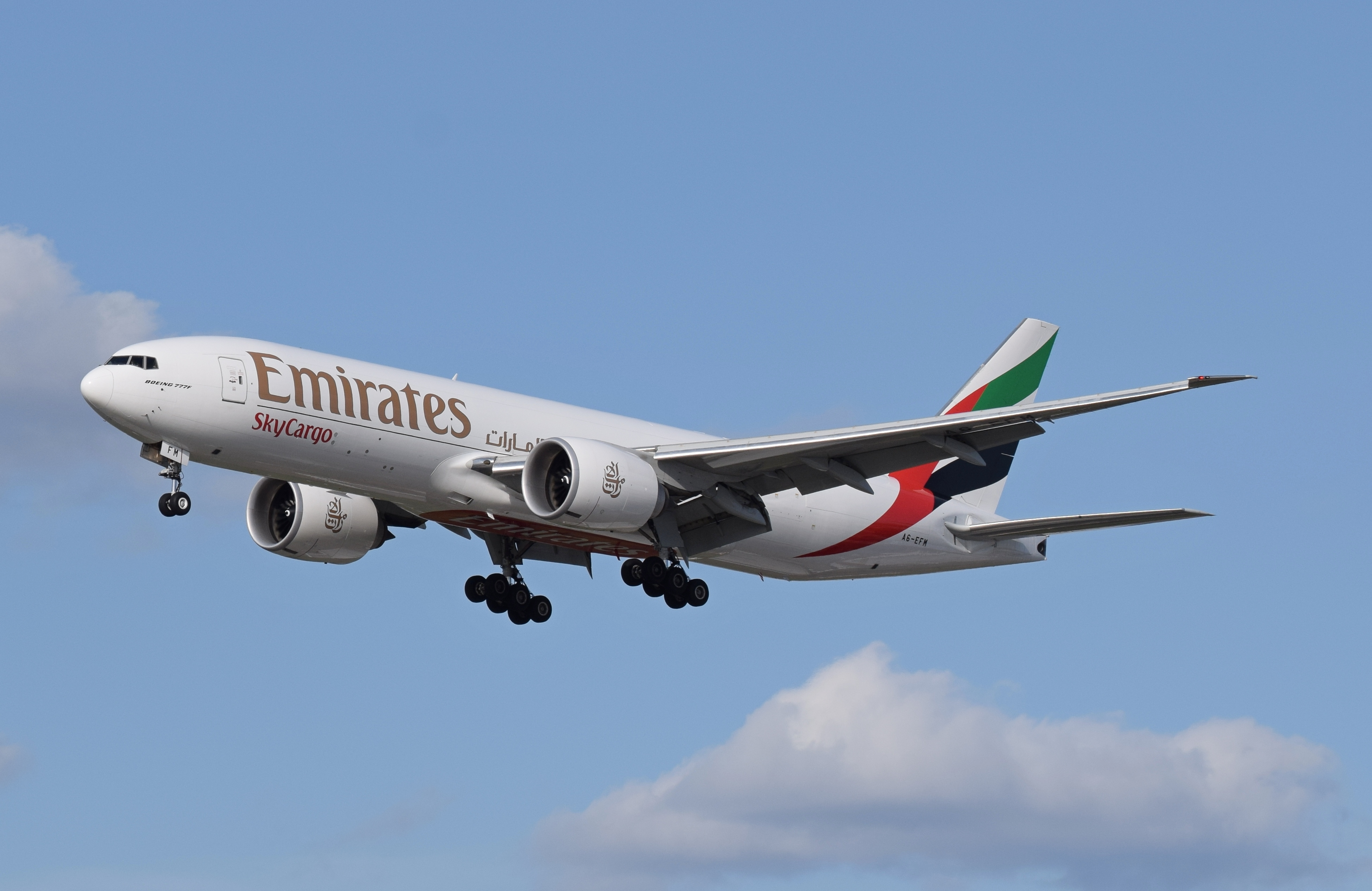
Emirates SkyCargo Boeing 777F

Emirates SkyCargo is a cargo carrier operating from Dubai International Airport. The SkyCargo division operates 13 Boeing 777 Freighters. Emirates SkyCargo also use the cargo capacity of the passenger fleet.

In the 2019-20 fiscal year, Emirates SkyCargo carried 2,389,000 tonnes, a decline of 10.2% compared to the previous year.

=== Airport aviation services ===
==== Dnata ====
Dnata is an aviation services company, comprising Dnata Airport Operations, the largest ground and passenger handling company at Dubai International Airport, Dnata Cargo, responsible for dealing with much of the 1.3 million tonnes of cargo passing through Dubai International Airport, Dnata Catering, a catering and retail service that was rebranded from Alpha Flight Services after Dnata acquired the company in 2010, and Dnata Agencies, a Dubai-based travel agency, acting on behalf of a number of major carries, including Aeroflot, Aer Lingus, Airblue, British Airways, Swiss and United Airlines.

==== Changi International Airport Services ====
Changi International Airport Services (CIAS) offers ground handling services to more than 30 scheduled airlines in Singapore.

=== Engineering services ===
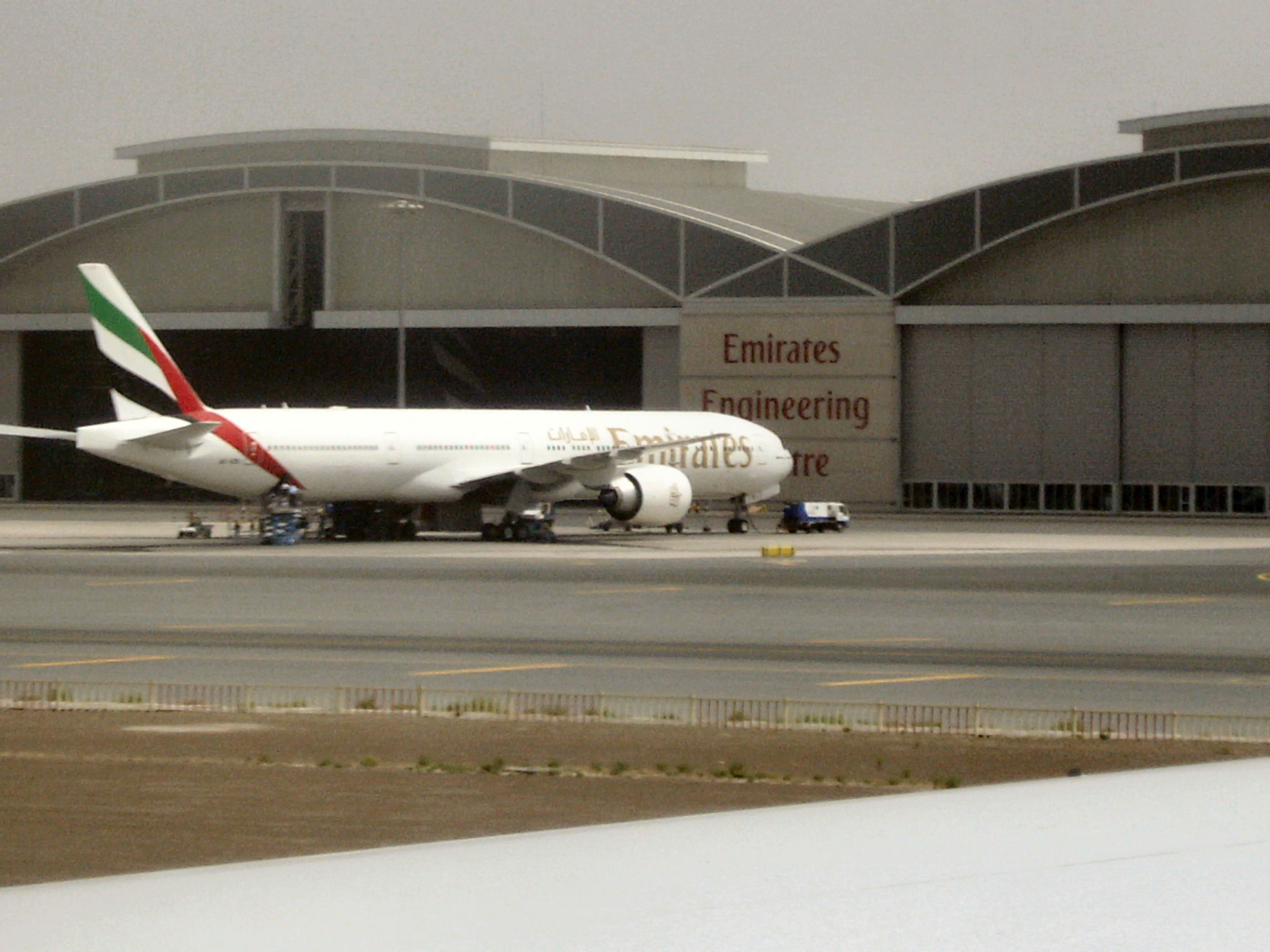
Emirates Engineering aircraft hangars

Emirates Engineering supports the expansive fleet of Airbus and Boeing aircraft operated by Emirates together with those of thirty other airlines through third party maintenance contracts.

The division can manage and implement all aspects of aircraft engineering support, such as maintenance, safety and logistics. It also has an engine test cell facility. It also occupies the Emirates Engineering Centre which opened in late 2006 on a 136-acre (0.55 km^{2}) site at Dubai International Airport.

Its eleven hangars for heavy and light maintenance, together with a paint hangar, cover an area equivalent to 17 football pitches and have the capacity to meet the service requirements of an Emirates fleet which is growing at the rate one new aircraft every month. Each hangar has an entrance gate 88 metres wide and every bay can accommodate any size of aircraft with an engine thrust of up to 150,000 pounds, including the Airbus A380, which is 73 metres long with an 80-metre wingspan and a tail 24 metres high.

=== Flight catering ===
Emirates Flight Catering

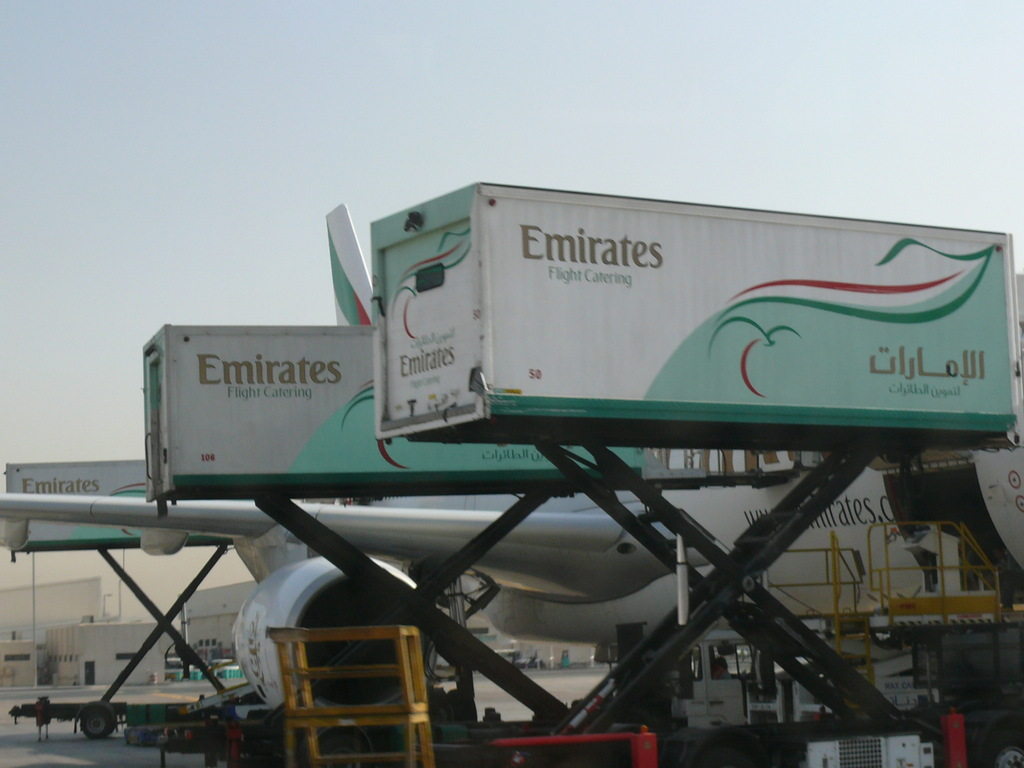
Emirates flight catering at Dubai International Airport

Emirates Flight Catering Company has over 11,000 employees and provides in-flight catering and support services for airlines at Dubai International Airport. It provides catering for all Emirates flights from Dubai, and also for other airlines operating at the airport. In 2009, Emirates was voted by Skytrax, the fourth best onboard catering in Business Class, and second best catering in Economy Class.

The catering facility servicing the airline's flights has a design capacity of 225,000 meal tray set-ups per day. The company provided over 55 million meals in 2017. The daily average meal uplift was 180,000.

Dnata Catering (Australia)

Dnata acquired the Alpha Flight Group in 2010. In January 2018, it began rebranding its Australian flight catering business, Alpha Flight Services, as Dnata Catering. The business then ran 11 catering units, employed more than 1,700 people and served 39 airline customers.

=== IT ===
Mercator was the IT division of the Emirates Group. It was launched in 1995 to serve the business technology requirements of Emirates and Dnata; later on not only provided to the Emirates Group companies, but also to other airlines and businesses.

2014 it was announced that the equity firm Warburg Pincus acquired a majority stake of Mercator and that Dnata would still hold a minority stake.

Mercator merged in 2017 with the Spanish aviation company Accelya and will operate under the latter name. Previous majority shareholder of Mercator, Warburg Pincus, is also the majority shareholder of the new company.

=== Retail ===
Emirates High Street

Emirates High Street is an online store which stocks over 400 products, such as luxury goods, electronics, and holiday packages. Customers use Skywards Miles, earned by members of Emirates airline's frequent flyer loyalty scheme, to buy products.

Emirates Leisure Retail

Emirates Leisure Retail's core business is establishing, managing and franchising restaurants, cafes, bars and leisure facilities in the GCC.

Emirates Official Store

Emirates Official Store stocks products such as airplane models, souvenirs, and Emirates-themed retail. Customers pay for products in UAE dirhams, US dollars, or use Skywards Miles, earned by members of Emirates's frequent flyer loyalty scheme, to buy products. It is available online and in 3 outlets across Dubai and Dubai International Airport's Terminal 3.

Sirocco

Sirocco is a joint venture between Emirates and Heineken International which manages the sales and marketing of a range of beverages in the Middle East. It handles brands such as Heineken, Amstel Light, Budweiser, Tiger, Carling and Sol, and – following Heineken's acquisition of Scottish & Newcastle – Bulmers and Strongbow. With a market share of 60% in Dubai, it is the leading operator in the UAE, as well as Oman, Bahrain and Qatar.

=== Risk management and security ===
Emirates Group Security

Emirates Group Security is an organization that is responsible for security measures throughout the Emirates network. It covers all Dubai passengers and cargo terminal users, company facilities and staff accommodation. Emirates Group Security also investigates theft, document fraud, misappropriation and all breaches of security against the interests of the company and its customers.

Transguard Group

Transguard Group is a security services provider in the Middle East with an annual turnover exceeding AED600 million and more than 38,000 full-time employees. It is also one of the region's largest operators in business support services, facilities management, cash management, security technology, training, events management and airport services. Established in 2001 as a support service provider to the numerous brands operating under the Emirates Group.

Its cash management business operates from the company's headquarters in Dubai's Airport Freezone which also houses the largest cash processing facility in the region, while an additional facility was recently opened in Abu Dhabi.

=== Tour operator and events management ===
Congress Solutions International

The company is a subsidiary of Emirates providing administrative support, managing data, and coordinating third party suppliers such as venues, catering, and accommodation. It deals with conferences and provides support to delegates, as well as providing leisure and recreational activities for visiting delegates.

CSI has hosted large events such as the Global Travel and Tourism Council, which around 1,300 delegates attended. It also hosted on behalf of the World Economic Forum and the government of Dubai, a summit on the Global Agenda attended by 700 business, government and academia representatives.

Gulf Ventures

Is another tourist company in the United Arab Emirates and Oman.

Arabian Adventures

Arabian Adventures is a destination management company, providing services to different tour operators, incentive houses, meeting organisers, businesses and cruise lines.

=== Travel ===
Emirates Holidays

Emirates Holidays is the tour operating arm of Emirates. Emirates Holidays top destinations are Dubai, Malaysia, Thailand, the Maldives, Sri Lanka and Mauritius.

EmQuest

EmQuest provides electronic distribution products and services to different firms, connecting suppliers with resellers and giving them a platform to exchange content and trade with one another.

It manages a large network of brands, content and services for tour operators, travel agents, car rental companies, hotels and airlines throughout the Middle East and Africa.

Global Distribution Systems (GDS) are a key line of business and EmQuest works with Sabre Holdings to manage the distribution, sales, service and support of Sabre GDS in the UAE, as well as five African markets, including South Africa, Kenya, Tanzania, Uganda and Zambia. Prior to this, EmQuest was known as Galileo Emirates and distributed products in the UAE, Pakistan, Afghanistan, Sri Lanka, Bahrain, Oman and Qatar.

=== Air cargo support services ===
Calogi

Calogi is an internet service portal for air cargo businesses.

Cargo Partners

Cargo Partners is the sales and services arm of Dnata Cargo and offers support to more than a quarter of all the airlines operating out of Dubai International Airport.

It manages export sales and local operations on behalf of more than 30 carriers.

Dnata-PWC Airport Logistics LLC

Dnata-PWC Airport Logistics LLC provides cargo transport services for both local and international customers, including Emirates Sky Cargo, British Airways and Singapore Airlines. The joint venture between Dnata and Public Warehousing Corporation Kuwait specialises in road haulage, with both heavy and light trucks that are designed for air cargo.

=== Freight forwarding and logistics ===
Dnata Logistics

Dnata logistics (previously Freightworks) is an international freight forwarder and logistics provider, located in Dubai (UAE).

SDV-UAE LLC

SDV-UAE LLC is one of the transport providers in the Middle East.

=== Hotels and resorts ===
As of 1 November 2007, the Emirates Group has launched the first of the Emirates Hotels & Resorts Residences with The Harbour Hotel & Residence. This is a hotel and residential tower located in Dubai Marina. It is the first of six international properties expected to open in 2008.

=== Loyalty programs ===
Emirates Loyalty Services

Emirates Loyalty Services is a consultancy subsidiary of Emirates' Skywards frequent flyer programme.

Emirates Skywards

Emirates Skywards is a four tier frequent flier program operated by Emirates. It is used by over 8.4 million customers. The three main tiers are Blue; Silver, which requires 25,000 tier miles for entry; and Gold, which requires 50,000 tier miles. There is a fourth tier named Platinum and requires 150,000 tier miles. There is an additional membership known as Invitation Only or "IO" where you must be invited to this small group of members. The benefits provided are over and above the Platinum benefits.

=== Training ===
Emirates Aviation University

The Aviation University located in Al Garhoud, and in Academic City is an education and training facility for the airline industry. The college opened in 1991, and was transitioned to a university in April 2014. The newer campus that is located in Academic City opened in January 2015. It offers professional academic and vocational training programmes. More than 1700 aerospace engineers and technicians and 2000 air traffic controllers have graduated from the college, while the number of full-time students has increased from 300 to 1100 between the years 2004 and 2009.

Emirates CAE Flight Training

Emirates-CAE Flight Training provides aviation-related courses for commercial carriers in the Middle East, Europe, Africa and Asia, primarily aimed at flight deck crew and airline maintenance personnel. The joint venture between Emirates Group and CAE Inc of Canada is located in the Emirates Aviation University campus, near Dubai International Airport. Emirates Aviation University now has a second campus in Academic City, DubaiLand.

ECFT, as the joint venture is known, is the first facility of its kind in the Middle East to be qualified to both Joint Aviation Authorities (JAA) and Federal Aviation Administration (FAA) standards. The 14-bay centre houses 10 full-flight simulators: two Airbus A320/ACJs, an Airbus A330/340, a Boeing 777, two Boeing 737 NG/BBJs, a Gulfstream IV and a Gulfstream V/550, a Hawker 800/800XP and a Bell 412 helicopter simulator.

== Key people ==
- HH Sheikh Ahmed bin Saeed Al Maktoum – Chairman and Chief Executive
- Tim Clark (airline executive/president)
- Gary Chapman – President Group Services

== Shareholdings ==
The Emirates Group holds a 68.7% stake in Dubai-based Maritime and Mercantile International (MMI), formerly Gray Mackenzie. The company was founded in Basra, Iraq as Gray Paul & Co. and opened in Dubai in 1916 as Gray Mackenzie & Co. The company was renamed Maritime & Mercantile International in 1983 and became a subsidiary of the Emirates Group in 2000.

Emirates also holds a 34.4% equity stake in Oman United Agencies and a 54.7% equity stake in Emirates Flight Catering. Emirates Flight Catering is the sole provider of airline and airport catering services at Dubai International Airport.

Dnata owns 50% equity stakes in Dubai Express, Gerry's Dnata (Pvt.) Ltd. and Dnata Arabian Airport Services Co. Ltd, 49% equity stake in Safiran Dnata Airport Services PJSC, 40% stake in Emirates Loyalty Company and a 20% stake in Guangzhou Baiyun International Airport Ground Handling Services Co. Ltd.

== See also ==
- Emirates (airline)
