= Perplex Ridge =

Perplex Ridge (67°39′S 67°43′W) is a ridge, rising over 915 m (3,002 ft), composed of four rocky masses separated by small glaciers, extending 6 nautical miles (11 km; 6.9 mi) northeastward from Lainez Point along the northwest side of Pourquoi Pas Island, off the west coast of Graham Land in Antarctica. First sighted and roughly charted in 1909 by the French Antarctic Expedition under Charcot. It was surveyed in 1936 by the British Graham Land Expedition (BGLE) and in 1948 by the Falkland Islands Dependencies Survey (FIDS). So named by FIDS because of confusion in attempting to identify this ridge from earlier maps.
