= Maurice Flanagan =

British businessman (1928–2015)

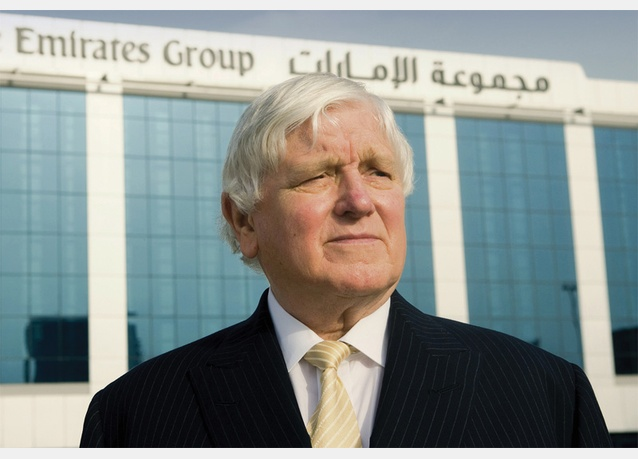
- Maurice Flanagan at an Emirates launch event
- Born: 17 November 1928; Leigh, Lancashire, England
- Died: 7 May 2015 (aged 86); London, England
- Citizenship: British
- Education: Leigh Boys Grammar School and Lymm Grammar School
- Alma mater: Liverpool University
- Occupation: Executive vice-chairman of The Emirates Group
- Spouse: Audrey Bolton (m. 1955, d.7 June 2020)
- Children: 3
- Military career
- Allegiance: United Kingdom
- Branch: Royal Air Force
- Service years: 1951–1956
- Rank: Flying Officer

Sir Maurice Flanagan KBE (17 November 1928 – 7 May 2015) was a British businessman and the founding CEO of the airline Emirates. He served as the executive vice-chairman of the Emirates Group.

== Early life ==
Flanagan was born in 1928 in Leigh, Lancashire, England. He attended initially the now defunct Leigh Boys Grammar School, starting the year World War II broke out, but transferred later to Lymm Grammar School, and then Liverpool University, where he gained a BA in History and French. He performed his National Service in the RAF as a navigator commissioned officer. Receiving a national service commission as an acting pilot officer in February 1951, he was confirmed in the rank of pilot officer in November. On Christmas Day, 1952, he was appointed to a commission in the RAFVR. He was promoted to flying officer in March 1954, and relinquished his commission two years later.

== Career ==
Abandoning an athletic profession in 1953, he joined BOAC as a management trainee, subsequently working for the airline in Kenya, Sri Lanka, Peru, Iran, India and the UK.

In 1969, Flanagan was one of the winners of a TV playwriting competition run by the Observer newspaper and ITV's Saturday Night Theatre with "The Garbler Strategy", a satire on management theory that starred Leonard Rossiter. Kenneth Tynan, one of the competition judges, invited Flanagan to write for the National Theatre, where Tynan was literary advisor. Flanagan chose the more sure route of a promising airline career.

Flanagan spent 25 years with BOAC and British Airways, held senior management positions with British Airways from 1974 until he was seconded from BA's senior management to Dnata, the organisation appointed by the government of Dubai to run its travel and airport interests.

In 1978, Flanagan was appointed director and general manager of Dubai National Air Travel Agency. In 1985, the Dubai government employed Flanagan to launch Emirates. The fledgling airline received $10 million start-up capital that it repaid the following year, marking its immediate success.

In 1990, Flanagan was appointed group managing director of the Emirates Group and became vice chairman and group president in July 2003. He was appointed executive vice chairman in 2006, and he retired in April 2013.

== Awards and honours ==
Flanagan was awarded a CBE in 2000 for services to communities in the United Arab Emirates and to aviation, and KBE in the 2010 Birthday Honours.

The music centre of Dubai College, a British school in the United Arab Emirates of which Flanagan was a board member, is also named after him, as the 'Sir Maurice Flanagan Music Centre'.

Other awards include Flight International magazine's Personality of the Year, membership of the British Travel Industry Hall of Fame, Aviation Legend award by the Centre for Asia Pacific Aviation, Fellow of the Royal Aeronautical Society and Honorary Fellow (the society's highest award), Liveryman of the Guild of Air Pilots and Air Navigators, and membership of the executive committee of the World Travel and Tourism Council.

== Personal life and death ==
In 1955, he married Audrey Bolton, a journalist, with whom he has three children and five grandchildren.

Flanagan died at his home in London on 7 May 2015 at the age of 86.

A memorial service was held at The London Oratory attended by many who served under him. Gary Chapman, President of Emirates Group, made a tribute to Sir Maurice at the service and Paul Griffiths, CEO of Dubai Airports played the organ.
