= Harvey Shoals =

The Harvey Shoals (68°11′S 67°9′W) are three shoal patches with least depths of 3 fathoms (5.5 m), located between Miller Island and Northstar Island in Marguerite Bay, Antarctica. They were charted by the Hydrographic Survey Unit from RRS John Biscoe in 1966, and were named for Petty Officer Brian E. Harvey, the surveying recorder who carried out all the sounding for this survey.
