= Tim Clark (airline executive) =

British-Emirati airline executive

Sir Tim Clark KBE FRAeS
- Born: 22 November 1949 (age 76); Aruba, Netherlands
- Citizenship: British; Emirati
- Education: University of London
- Occupation: President
- Employer: Emirates Group
- Website: Emirates.com

Sir Timothy Charles Clark KBE FRAeS (born 22 November 1949) is a British business executive and the President of Dubai-based airline Emirates since January 2003. He was also the Managing Director of SriLankan Airlines until 2008.

== Education ==
He attended Kent College, Canterbury and is a fellow of the Royal Aeronautical Society. He is an economics graduate from the University of London.

== Career ==
Clark has been in the civil aviation business since 1972 when he joined British Caledonian. In 1975, he moved to Pakistan International Airlines then Gulf Air in Bahrain and subsequently to Dubai in 1985 where he became a member of the founding team of Emirates as Head of Airline Planning. He is currently the President of Emirates. He was also Managing Director of SriLankan Airlines until 2008. The latter post resulted from the acquisition of a 40% stake in SriLankan Airlines by Emirates in April 1998. However, that post was lost when the Sri Lankan government took control of the airline and Emirates never renewed their contract for management of the airline.

Clark became president of Emirates in 2003. In addition, Clark is the chairman of the Emirates Airline Foundation, a non-profit charity which provides humanitarian philanthropic aid and services for children in need around the world. In December 2019, Clark announced that he would be stepping down from his role as President of Emirates, but subsequently delayed his retirement due to the Covid-19 pandemic.

In 2021, Clark acquired Emirati citizenship.

== Awards and recognition ==
Clark was appointed Knight Commander of the Order of the British Empire (KBE) in the 2014 New Year Honours for services to British prosperity and to the aviation industry.

Aviation Week & Space Technology magazine named Clark its 2013 Person of the Year.

== Personal life ==
Clark is married with three children.

== See also ==
- The Emirates Group
