= Nautilus Head =

Nautilus Head (67°38′S 67°7′W) is a prominent headland rising to 975 m near the northeast extremity of Pourquoi Pas Island, off the west coast of Graham Land. It was first surveyed in 1936 by the British Graham Land Expedition (BGLE) under Rymill and resurveyed in 1948 by the Falkland Islands Dependencies Survey (FIDS) who named it after the submarine Nautilus in Jules Verne's 1870 novel Twenty Thousand Leagues Under the Seas. Other features on Pourquoi Pas Island are named after characters from that book.
