= Lainez Point =

Lainez Point (67°41′S 67°48′W) is a point that forms the north side of the entrance to Dalgliesh Bay on the west side of Pourquoi Pas Island, off the west coast of Graham Land, Antarctica. It was discovered by the French Antarctic Expedition, 1908–10, under Jean-Baptiste Charcot, and named by him for Manuel Lainez, a senator of the Argentine Republic and founder of the newspaper El Diario.
