= Lagotellerie Island =

Island of Antarctica

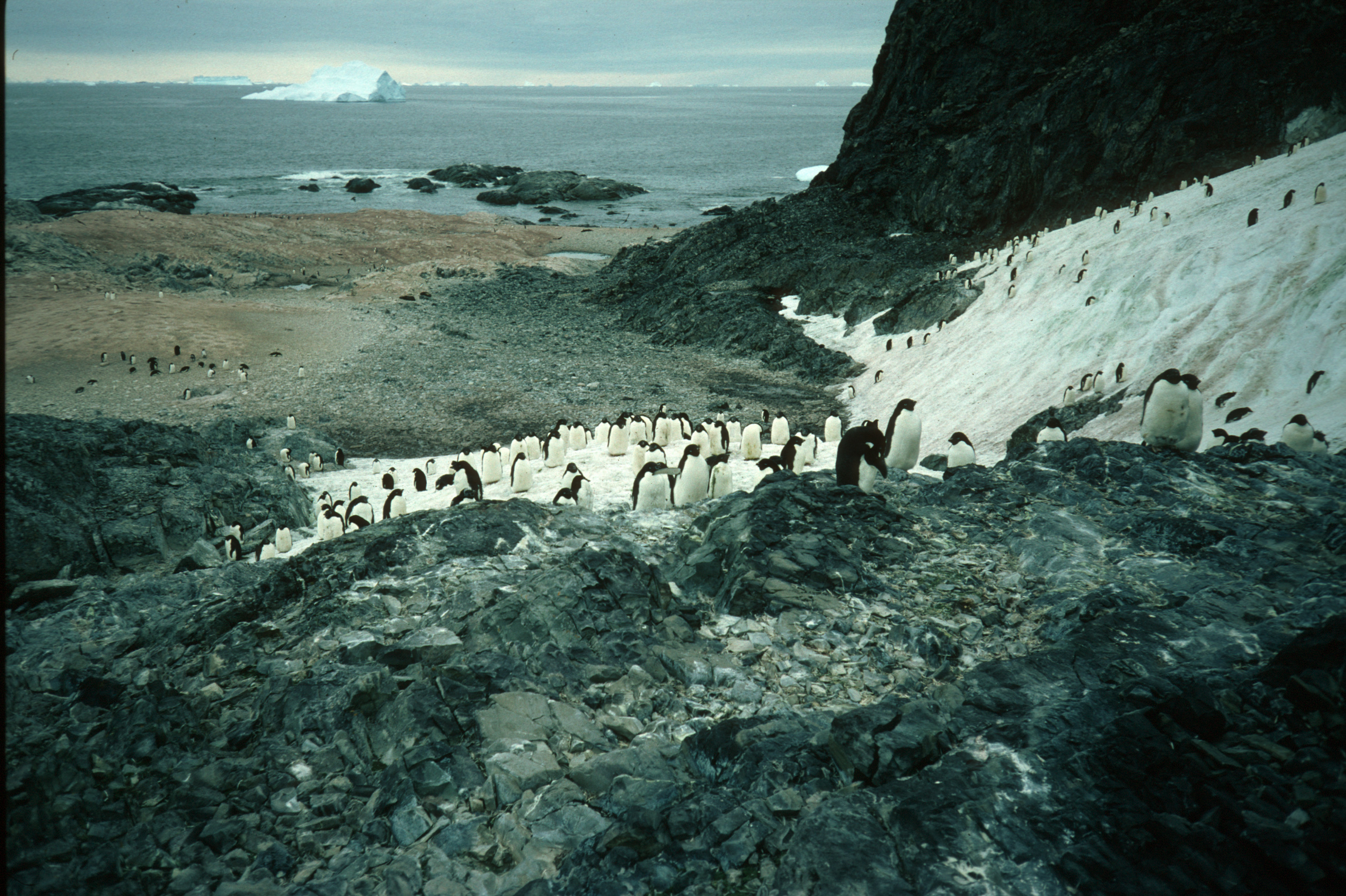
- Adélie penguin colony on Lagotellerie Island

- Location within Antarctica

Geography
- Location: Antarctica
- Coordinates: 67°53′16″S 67°24′02″W
- Area: 158 ha (390 acres)
- Length: 2 km (1.2 mi)
- Highest elevation: 288 m (945 ft)

Administration
- Administered under the Antarctic Treaty System

Demographics
- Population: Uninhabited

Lagotellerie Island is an island 1.9 kilometres (1 nmi) long, lying 3.7 kilometres (2 nmi) west of Horseshoe Island in Marguerite Bay, off the west coast of Graham Land, Antarctica. It was discovered and named by the French Antarctic Expedition, 1908–10, under Jean-Baptiste Charcot.

== Antarctic Specially Protected Area ==
The 158 ha island has been designated an Antarctic Specially Protected Area (ASPA No.115) because of its relatively diverse flora and fauna, which is typical of the southern Antarctic Peninsula region. The vegetation consists of abundant stands of the continent's only two flowering plants, Antarctic hair grass and Antarctic pearlwort, as well as well-developed communities of mosses and lichen. The rich invertebrate fauna includes the wingless midge Belgica antarctica, for which the island is one of its southernmost sites. There are also colonies of Adélie penguins and Antarctic shags.

== Important Bird Area ==
The island has been designated an Important Bird Area (IBA) by BirdLife International because it supports about 270 breeding pairs of Antarctic shags and 81 pairs of south polar skuas. As well as Adélie penguins, other birds recorded as breeding on the site include Kelp gulls, snow petrels and Wilson's storm petrels. The island is also used as a haul-out by Weddell seals, Antarctic fur seals and southern elephant seals.

== See also ==
- List of Antarctic and Subantarctic islands
