= Statham =

Statham is a surname. Notable people with the surname include:

- Brian Statham, English cricketer
- Brian Statham (footballer), English football player
- Derek Statham, English football player
- Francis Reginald Statham, Cape writer and composer
- Harry Statham, American basketball coach
- Jason Statham, English actor
- John Statham, MP
- Nick Statham, Dutch cricketer
- Nicholas Statham, English jurist
- Henry Heathcote Statham, English architect, journalist and music critic

Fictional characters:

- Alan Statham, fictional doctor in the TV comedy series Green Wing

== See also ==
- Statham, Georgia, city in Barrow County, Georgia, United States
- Statham Peak, a peak on Pourquoi Pas Island
- Statham, a settlement in the civil parish of Lymm, part of the borough of Warrington, England, UK
