= Conseil Hill =

Hill on Pourquoi Pas Island, Antarctica

Conseil Hill (67°36′S 67°28′W) is a hill midway along the north shore of Pourquoi Pas Island. It was mapped by the Falkland Islands Dependencies Survey from surveys and air photos, 1946–59, and named by the UK Antarctic Place-Names Committee after a character in Jules Verne's 1870 novel Twenty Thousand Leagues Under the Seas.
