= Emirates Flight Catering =

Airline catering company in the United Arab Emirates

- Type: Public
- Industry: In-flight catering and support services
- Founded: Dubai (2003)
- Founder: The Emirates Group
- Headquarters: Deira, Dubai, United Arab Emirates
- Key people: Ahmed bin Saeed Al Maktoum (Chairman); Gary Chapman (Director); Abdulaziz Abdulla Abdulrahman Al Ali (Director); Adel Al Redha (Director); Shahreyar nawabi (Interim CEO)
- Owner: The Emirates Group (90%); Dubai Airports Company (10%)
- Subsidiaries: Linencraft; Food Point
- Website: http://www.emiratesflightcatering.com/

Emirates Flight Catering (Arabic: الإمارات لتموين الطائرات) (EKFC) is an in-flight catering service based in Dubai, United Arab Emirates, which provides catering and support services for the Emirates airline and all other airlines based at Dubai International Airport. It is a subsidiary of The Emirates Group.

EKFC directly employs over 11,000 staff, and operates from the Emirates Flight Catering Centre which can produce over 225,000 meals daily. The Company provided 55 million meals in 2017, with an average daily meal uplift of 180,000.

== History ==
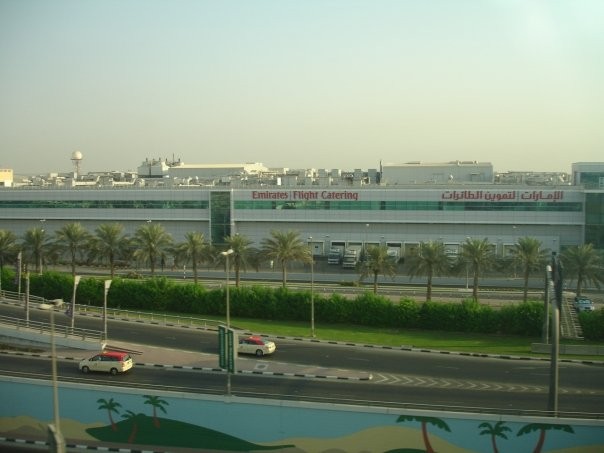
Emirates Flight Catering at Dubai International Airport

Emirates Flight Catering was formed out of Emirates Abela Catering Company in 2003. It now produces more than 55 million meals per year and has a fleet of 295 high loader trucks and 89 special vehicle for the Airbus A380.

In July 2005, EKFC began operations at its new Food Point facility, a 10,000 m^{2} (107,639 sq ft) facility capable of producing 30 million meals annually.

In early 2006, EKFC began operations at a new catering facility dedicated to service flights on Emirates. The facility can produce over 115,000 meals daily. The older facility is now used to serve all 120 of the international airlines operating out of Dubai Airport, as well as providing catering for 25 lounges at Dubai Airports. Also in 2006, EKFC expanded its Linencraft laundering plant.

February 19, 2024 - Emirates Flight Catering completed the full acquisition of Emirates Bustanica, previously known as Emirates Crop One. Bustanica, its consumer brand, is recognized as the largest indoor vertical farm in the world.

== Subsidiaries ==
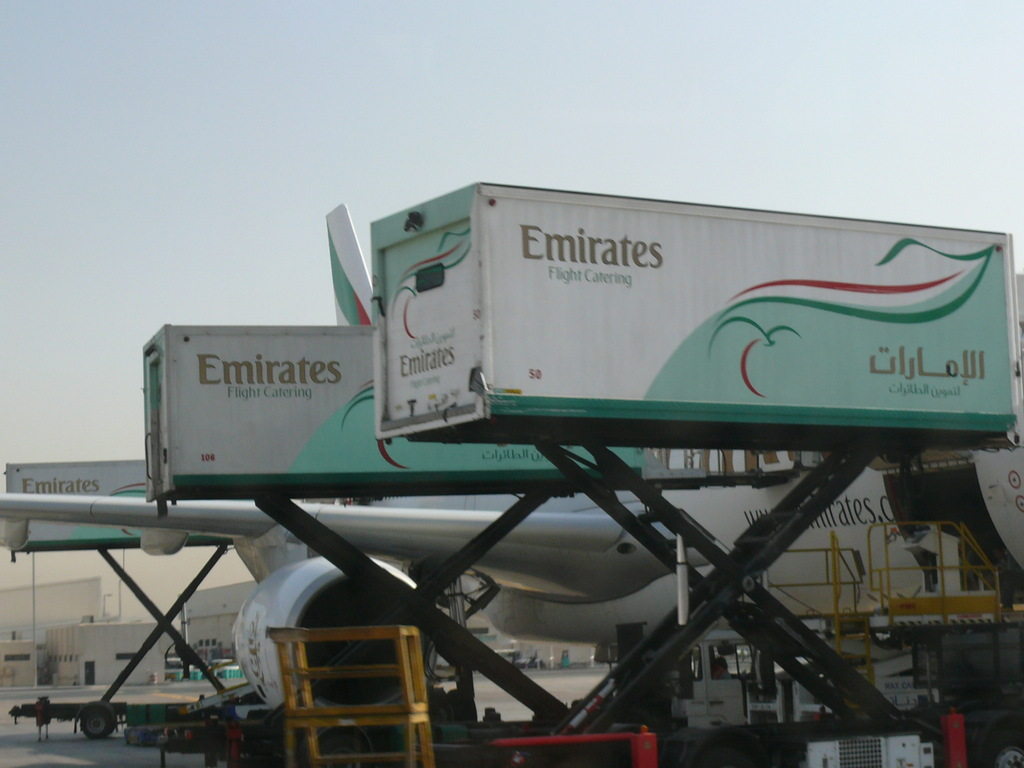
Emirates Flight Catering at Dubai International Airport

=== Food Point ===
Food Point is a catering facility based at Dubai Investment Park that opened in July 2005. It is another food production facility, and can produce over 30 million meals annually. Food Point was designed and its project managed by European Projects, a UK-based specialist food design company that has since become International Food Systems Ltd.

=== Linencraft ===
Linencraft is a laundering facility with a total area of 10,500 m^{2} (113,021 sq ft) located at Dubai Investment Park. Since the expansion to a processing volume of up to 80 tons per day in 2007, the facility is now able to process 210 tons of laundry and dry cleaning output per day.
