= Jones Ice Shelf =

Former ice shelf in Antarctica

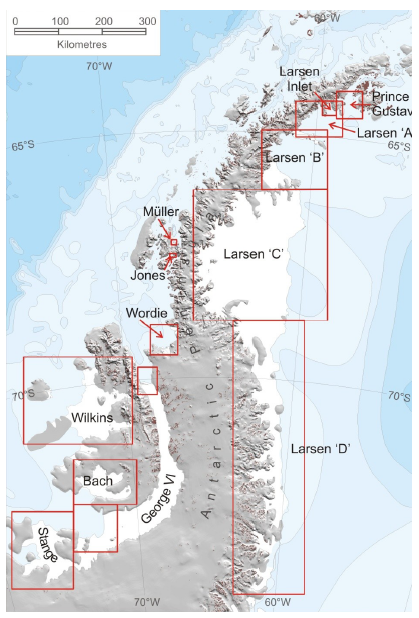
The ice shelves of the Antarctic peninsula.

Jones Ice Shelf (67°31′S 67°1′W) was the ice shelf occupying the Jones Channel, between the Arrowsmith Peninsula and Blaiklock Island, on the west coast of Graham Land, Antarctica. It was named by the UK Antarctic Place-Names Committee in 1981 in association with the channel.

The shelf was stable between 1947 and 1969, rising from 3 to 12 metres (10 to 40 ft) above sea level as it blocked the channel. It started to retreat in the 1970s and by 2003 had completely disappeared.

== See also ==
- Ice shelves of Antarctica
