= Emperor Island =

Island of Antarctica

- Location within Antarctica

Geography
- Location: Antarctica
- Coordinates: 67°52′S 68°43′W

Administration
- Administered under the Antarctic Treaty System

Demographics
- Population: Uninhabited

Emperor Island is a small island in Marguerite Bay, lying close north-east of the Courtier Islands in the Dion Islands. The islands in this group were discovered and roughly charted in 1909 by the French Antarctic Expedition. This island was surveyed in 1948 by the Falkland Islands Dependencies Survey and so named by the UK Antarctic Place-Names Committee because a low rock and shingle isthmus at the south-eastern end of the island was the winter breeding site of emperor penguins.

== Important Bird Area ==
A 467 ha site, coinciding with that of Antarctic Specially Protected Area (ASPA) No.107, has been designated an Important Bird Area (IBA) by BirdLife International because it supports a breeding colony of Antarctic shags. It is likely that emperor penguins no longer breed on the island.

== See also ==
- List of Antarctic and Subantarctic islands
