= Kosiba Wall =

Cliff in Antarctica

Kosiba Wall (67°31′S 66°55′W) is a cliff face rising to 1,180 metres (3,870 ft) at the northeastern end of Blaiklock Island, off the west coast of Graham Land, Antarctica. It was named by the UK Antarctic Place-Names Committee following British Antarctic Survey geological work in the area, 1980–81.

The cliff was named after Polish climatologist and glaciologist Aleksander Kosiba, who was Professor of Meteorology and Climatology, University of Wrocław, 1945–71, leader of the first Polish expedition to Greenland, 1937, and of Polish glaciological expeditions to Svalbard, 1957–60.
