= Mushroom Island =

Island in Graham Land, Antarctica

- Location within Antarctica

Geography
- Location: Antarctica
- Coordinates: 68°53′S 67°53′W

Administration
- Administered under the Antarctic Treaty System

Demographics
- Population: Uninhabited

Mushroom Island in the Antarctic is an ice-covered island lying 19 kilometres (10 nmi) west-southwest of Cape Berteaux, off the west coast of Graham Land.

It was first charted by the British Graham Land Expedition (BGLE) under Rymill, 1934–37, and so named because of its resemblance to a mushroom cap.

== See also ==
- List of Antarctic and sub-Antarctic islands
