= Marguerite Bay =

Bay in Antarctica

- Location in Antarctica

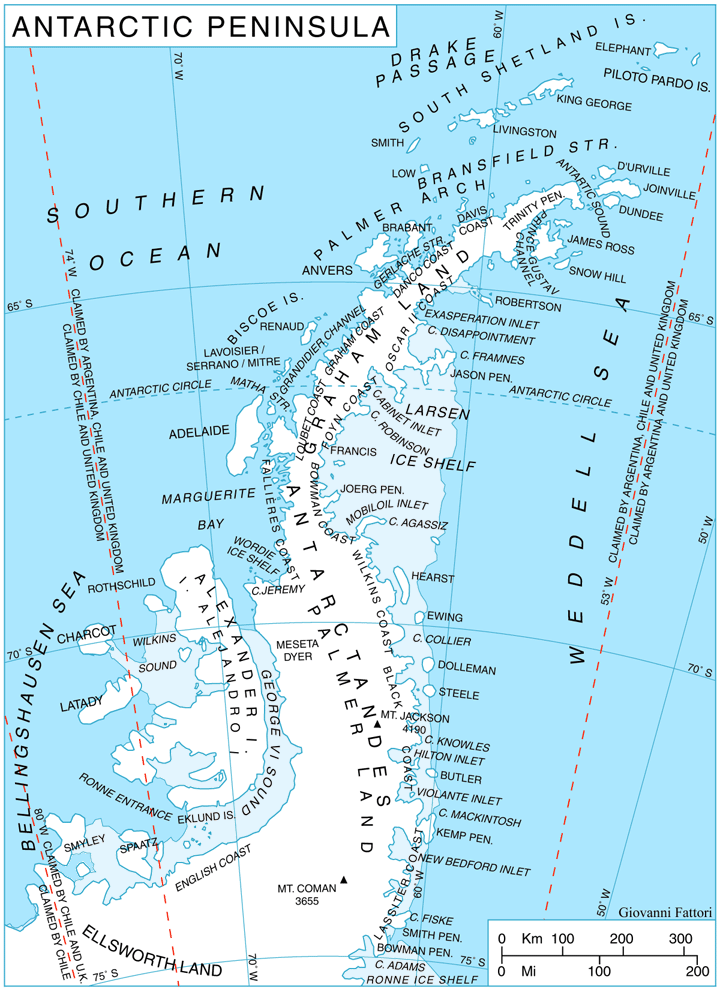
- Location in Antarctic Peninsula
- Location: Antarctic Peninsula
- Coordinates: 68°30′S 068°30′W
- Ocean/sea sources: Southern Ocean

Marguerite Bay or Margaret Bay is an extensive bay on the west side of the Antarctic Peninsula, which is bounded on the north by Adelaide Island and on the south by Wordie Ice Shelf, George VI Sound and Alexander Island. The mainland coast on the Antarctic Peninsula is Fallières Coast. Islands within the bay include Pourquoi Pas Island, Horseshoe Island, Terminal Island, and Lagotellerie Island. Marguerite Bay was discovered in 1909 by the French Antarctic Expedition under Jean-Baptiste Charcot, who named the bay for his wife.

== Named features ==
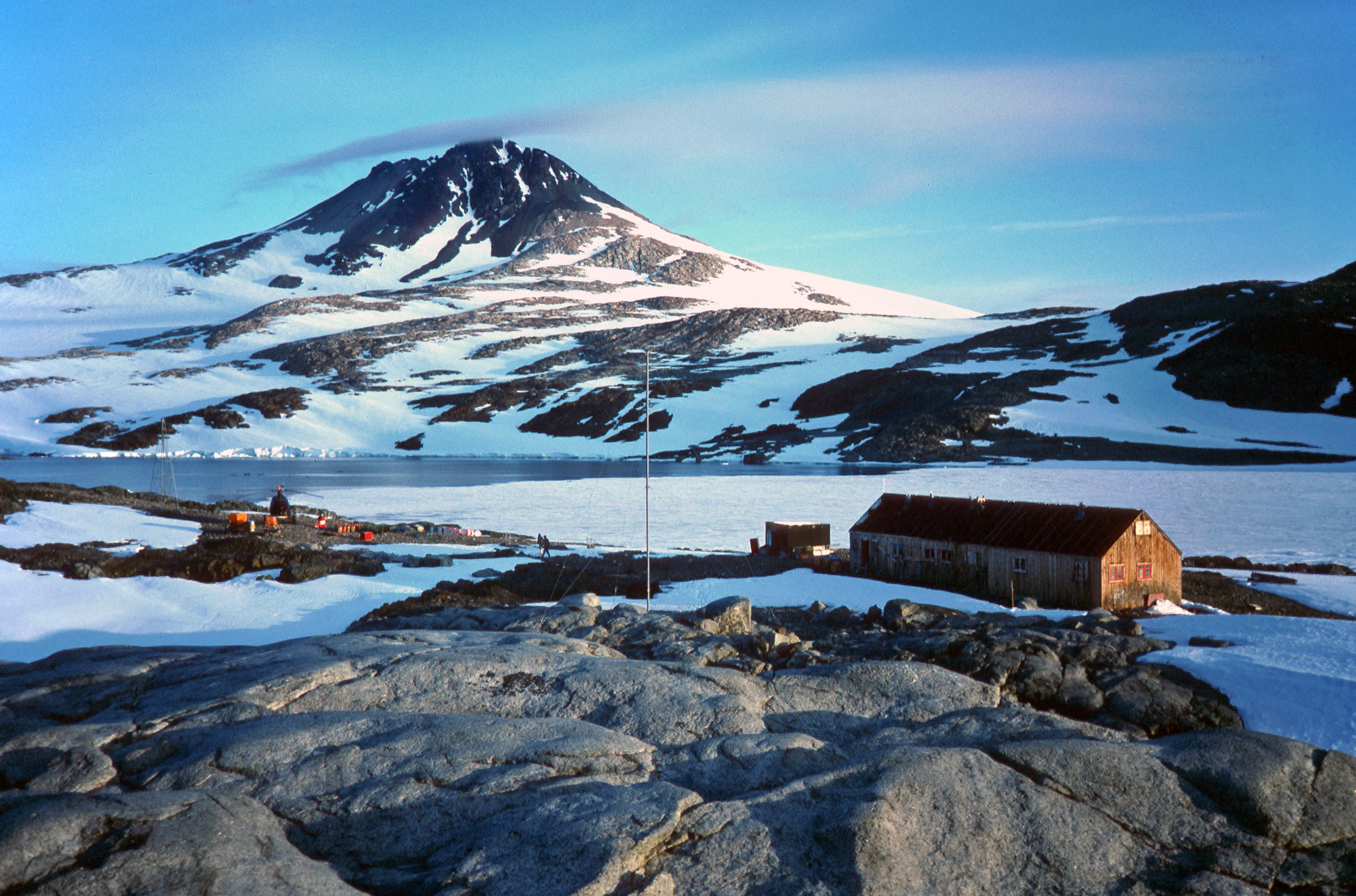
Base Y on Horseshoe island at Marguerite Bay

Toadstool Rocks are a group of insular, ice-covered rocks that rise to about 250 cm above sea level in the southwest part of Marguerite Bay, east-southeast of Terminal Island. The rocks were roughly charted from RRS association with Mushroom Island and Puffball Islands.

Endurance Reef is a reef in Marguerite Bay, lying 8 miles (13 km) west of Red Rock Ridge. The name is after HMS Endurance which at this position in February 1972 struck a rock in a depth of 2 metres (7 ft). The area was surveyed by boats from the Endurance in 1973 when similar depths were found up to 1 mile (1.6 km) south-southwest of the rock.

Harvey Shoals (68°11′S 67°9′W) are three shoal patches located between Miller Island and Northstar Island in Marguerite Bay. They were charted by the Hydrographic Survey Unit from RRS John Biscoe in 1966, and were named for Petty Officer Brian E. Harvey, the surveying recorder who carried out all the sounding for this survey.

Noble Rocks (67°52′S 68°41′W) is a group of about 19 small, low rocks in Marguerite Bay, lying east of Jester Rock in the Dion Islands. The Dion Islands were first sighted and roughly charted in 1909 by the FrAE. Noble Rocks were surveyed in 1949 by the Falkland Islands Dependencies Survey (FIDS), and so named by the United Kingdom Antarctic Place-Names Committee (UK-APC) because of their association with Emperor Island.
