= Terminal Island (Antarctica) =

Island in Antarctica

Rothschild Island
- Location within Antarctica

Geography
- Location: Antarctica
- Coordinates: 68°45′S 70°35′W

Administration
- Administered under the Antarctic Treaty System

Demographics
- Population: Uninhabited

Terminal Island is a low snow-covered island 0.5 nmi (0.93 km) off the north tip of Alexander Island, in the Bellingshausen Sea west of Palmer Land, Antarctic Peninsula. It was first mapped by the Falkland Islands Dependencies Survey (FIDS) in 1960 from air photography taken by Ronne Antarctic Research Expedition (RARE), 1947–1948. The name, given by the UK Antarctic Place-names Committee (UK-APC), is descriptive of its position relative to Alexander Island.
