= Bigourdan Fjord =

Bigourdan Fjord (67°33′S 67°23′W) is a fjord or sound on the west coast of Graham Land, Antarctica. It is about 12 mi (19 km) long in an east–west direction and averages about 2 mi (3 km) wide. It lies between Pourquoi Pas Island and the southwestern part of Arrowsmith Peninsula, in the Loubet Coast region of the Antarctic Peninsula. Swash Reef is located in the entrance of the fjord.

== History and naming ==
The fjord was discovered and roughly charted by the French Antarctic Expedition, 1908–1910, led by Jean-Baptiste Charcot. Charcot named it Fiord Bigourdan after Guillaume Bigourdan (1851–1932), a French astronomer and member of the expedition's scientific commission.

The feature was later recharted by the British Graham Land Expedition under John Riddoch Rymill in 1936. It was further surveyed by the Falkland Islands Dependencies Survey from Stonington Island in November 1948.
