= Dion Islands =

Island group in Antarctica

- Location within Antarctica

Geography
- Location: Antarctica
- Coordinates: 67°52′S 68°43′W

Administration
- Administered under the Antarctic Treaty System

Demographics
- Population: Uninhabited

The Dion Islands are a group of small islands and rocks lying in the northern part of Marguerite Bay, 11 kilometres (6 nmi) south-west of Cape Alexandra, Adelaide Island, off the west coast of the Antarctic Peninsula. They were discovered by the French Antarctic Expedition, 1908–10, and named by Jean-Baptiste Charcot for the Marquis Jules-Albert de Dion, who donated three motor sledges and whose De Dion-Bouton works produced equipment for the expedition.

== Important Bird Area ==
The islands have been identified as an Important Bird Area (IBA) by BirdLife International because they support a breeding colony of about 500 pairs of imperial shags. There is also a small colony of about 150 pairs of emperor penguins, the second-most northerly known of this species (the most northerly being Snow Hill Island) and one of only two on land. The site has been designated an Antarctic Specially Protected Area (ASPA 107) because of the penguin colony. However, this colony was reported lost due to climatic changes in 2011.

== See also ==
- List of Antarctic and subantarctic islands
