= Pourquoi Pas Island =

Island in Graham Land, Antarctica

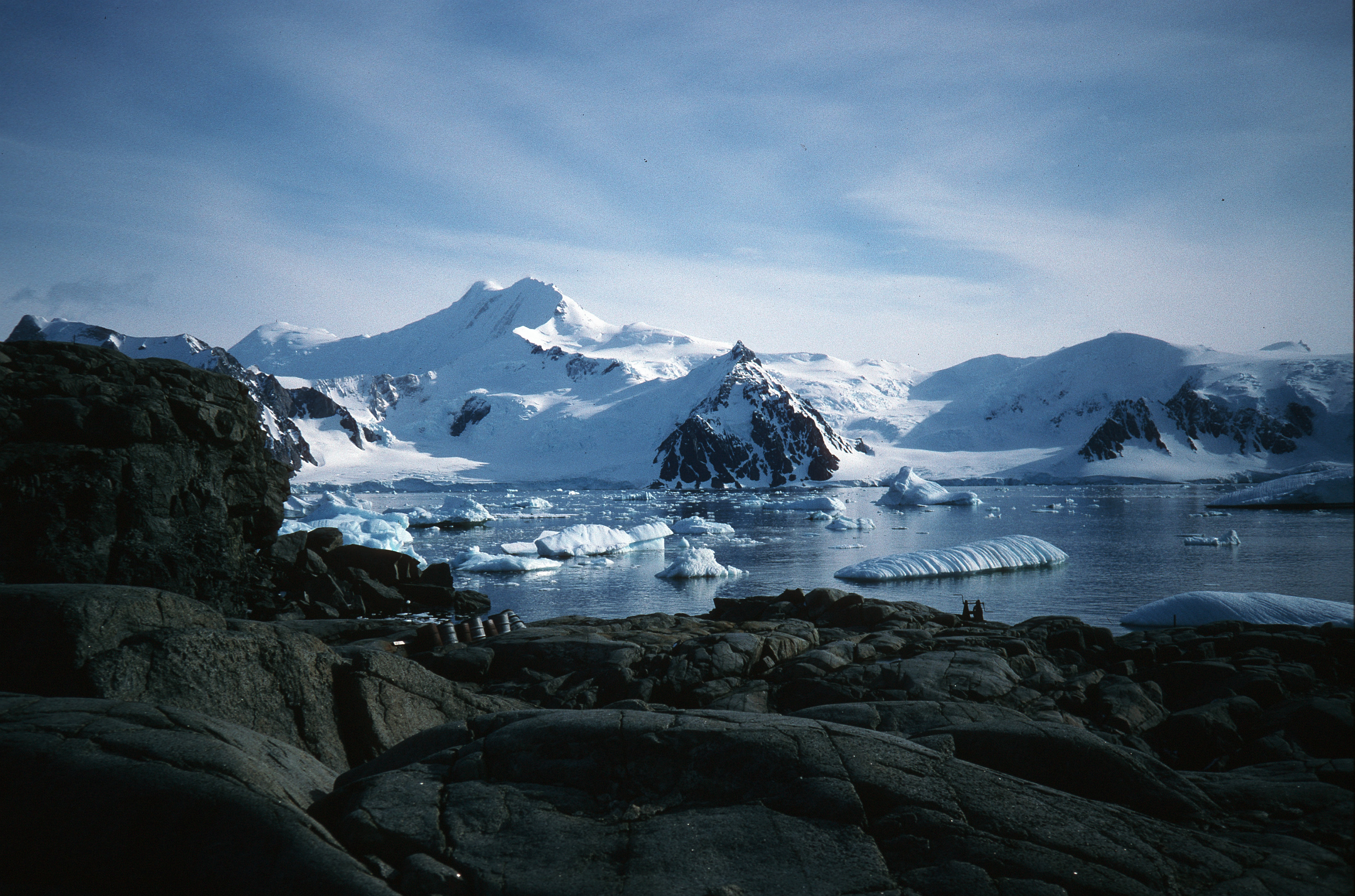
- View of Pourquoi Pas Island from Horseshoe Island

- Location within Antarctica

Geography
- Location: Antarctica
- Coordinates: 67°41′S 67°28′W
- Length: 27 km (16.8 mi)
- Width: 13 km (8.1 mi)

Administration
- Administered under the Antarctic Treaty System

Demographics
- Population: Uninhabited

Pourquoi Pas Island is a mountainous island, 27 km (17 mi) long and from 8 to 18 km (5 to 11 mi) wide, lying between Bigourdan Fjord and Bourgeois Fjord off the west coast of Graham Land in West Antarctica. It was discovered by the French Antarctic Expedition under Charcot, 1908–1910. The island was charted more accurately by the British Graham Land Expedition (BGLE) under John Rymill, 1934–1937, who named it for Charcot's expedition ship, the Pourquoi-Pas.

== See also ==
- Black Pass
- Conseil Hill
- Quilp Rock, an isolated rock 2.4 kilometres (1.3 nmi) off the northwest side of Pourquoi Pas Island
- Composite Antarctic Gazetteer
- List of Antarctic and sub-Antarctic islands
- List of Antarctic islands south of 60° S
- Mount Arronax
- Scientific Committee on Antarctic Research (SCAR)
- Territorial claims in Antarctica
