= Hades in popular culture =

Depictions of the Greek god

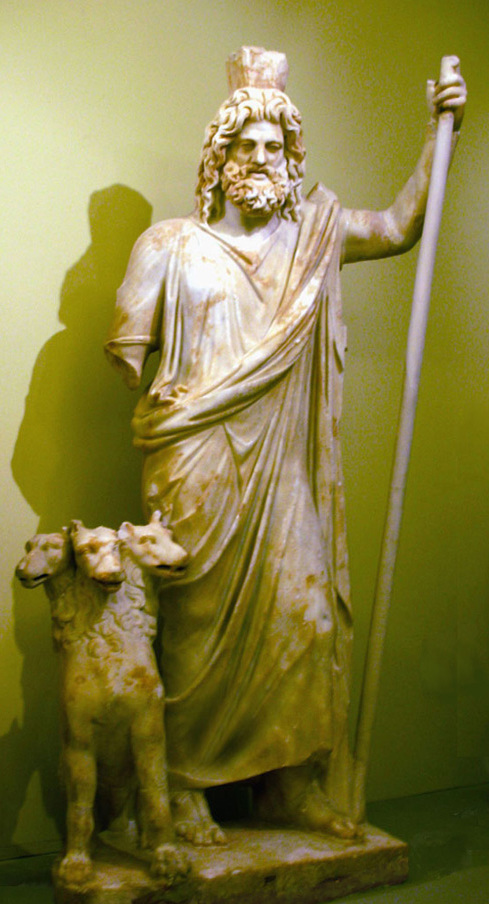
Hades with Cerberus (Heraklion Archaeological Museum)

The mythological Greek deity Hades often appears in popular culture.

== Film and television ==
Hades, under his Roman name Pluto, appears in Pasolini's film The Canterbury Tales. He is portrayed by Italian actor Giuseppe Arrigio. In the film, he encounters the blind cuckold Sir January while strolling through January's secret garden. He feels pity for January, so he uses his powers to give him back his eyesight so that he may see his wife cheating on him. See also The Merchant's Tale

Hades appears in Jim Henson's TV series The Storyteller: Greek Myths, in the episode "Orpheus and Eurydice". He was portrayed by Robert Stephens.

In the 1997 Disney film Hercules, Hades appears as the main antagonist. Unlike the mythological Hades, this version is a fast-talking, hot-tempered, and evil deity; a combination of Satan and a dodgy Hollywood agent. He plans to overthrow Zeus and rule the universe, attempting to kill Hercules so that he cannot foil his plot. However, he fails and is trapped in the River Styx. The character was voiced by James Woods and has gone on to appear in various Disney media, with Woods reprising the role.

In the television series Hercules: The Legendary Journeys, Xena: Warrior Princess, and Young Hercules, Hades was a recurring character, most frequently portrayed by Erik Thomson, but also by Mark Ferguson and Stephen Lovatt. He was depicted as being overworked and understaffed.

In the DC Comics TV series Smallville, the powerful and demonic deity Darkseid was known in Earth's history by many names, including Hades and Lucifer, and was also connected to the Hindu goddess Kali.

Hades appears in the remake of Clash of the Titans and its sequel Wrath of the Titans, portrayed by Ralph Fiennes.

In the anime television series adaption of the PSP game Kamigami no Asobi, aired from April 2014 until July 2014, Hades is one of the gods sent by Zeus to an academy located in a separate realm which resembles a human high school to learn about the meaning of love and humanity, in an attempt to reverse the weakening bond between humans and the gods.

Hades appears in the Japanese manga Saint Seiya written by Masami Kurumada where it is portrayed as the main villain in Hades Saga, engaging in war against the goddess Athena and his saints. He also appears in Record of Ragnarok, known in Japan as Shūmatsu no Warukyūre (終末のワルキューレ; lit. "Doomsday Valkyrie"), written by Shinya Umemura and Takumi Fukui and illustrated by Azychika, as a representative of the Gods fighting in the 7th round against Qin Shi Huang,

In 2016, Hades was portrayed by Greg Germann in the fifth season of the ABC fantasy-drama series Once Upon a Time. This version is based on the Disney version from Hercules and is depicted as being in love with Zelena, the Wicked Witch of the West.

Cheyenne Jackson portrayed Hades in the 2019 Disney Channel television film Descendants 3. This version is also based on the Disney version from Hercules. He is depicted to be the father of the protagonist Mal, that he had from his former marriage with Maleficent, the villain from the Disney film Sleeping Beauty.

Hades appears in the 2010 movie Percy Jackson & the Olympians: The Lightning Thief, portrayed by Steve Coogan. In the Disney+ series Percy Jackson and the Olympians, Hades appears in the first season, portrayed by actor and filmmaker Jay Duplass.

Hades also appears in the Netflix animated series Blood of Zeus. Introduced in the first season (2020), he becomes a main antagonist in the second season (2024). Hades is voiced by Fred Tatasciore.

Hades appears in the 2025 anime adaptation of the mobile game Disney Twisted-Wonderland as the Disney interpretation of him. While still a background character, clips of him from the 1997 Hercules film are used in intro for the anime's first episode, and a sequence in the second episode of the first season.

== Music ==
- Anaïs Mitchell's folk opera album Hadestown presents Hades as the boss of a post-apocalyptic Depression-era company town. The 2010 recording features Greg Brown performing the deep-voiced part of Hades. In the Broadway debut of the show, the role of Hades was played by Patrick Page. Later players of the role on Broadway and in the West End include Phillip Boykin, Tom Hewitt, Zachary James, and Chris Jarman.
- South Korean boy band VIXX's 2016 album Hades presents Hades as the character theme of their album and the title song "Fantasy", the second album in a series about Greek Gods.

== Gaming ==
- Hades appears in several installments of the God of War video game series. He was voiced by Nolan North in the first game, where he served as a minor supporting character and ally, and by Clancy Brown in God of War III, where he serves as a major antagonist, and Ascension, where he is again a minor character in the game's multiplayer mode.
- Hades is one of the main characters of the PSP game Kamigami no Asobi: Ludere Deorum, translated as Mischief of the Gods, where he is a potential love interest for the protagonist.
- Hades can be worshipped in Zeus: Master of Olympus, providing benefits to the player's city.
- Hades appears in the Kingdom Hearts series, based on his appearance in the Disney movie Hercules, with James Woods reprising his role.
- Hades appears in Age of Mythology and Age of Empires: Mythologies.
- Hades plays a major role in Herc's Adventures.
- Hades is the main antagonist in Kid Icarus: Uprising, voiced by S. Scott Bullock, with a personality similar to James Woods' version of Hades. He first appears at the end of Chapter 9, when Pit and Palutena believe the war against the Underworld Army is over, and reveals himself to be the true enemy controlling the Underworld. By the end of the game, he is defeated.
- In Persona 2: Innocent Sin, Hades is Eikichi Mishina's ultimate Persona.
- Hades appears in Smite, a multiplayer online battle arena, as a playable god.
- An AI named "HADES" is the main antagonist of Horizon Zero Dawn. Created as a subordinate function of the terraforming system GAIA, HADES was designed to take control and reverse the terraforming process in the event that the process had failed, allowing the system to start with a clean slate.
- Hades appears in the second installment of the 'Fate of Atlantis' downloadable content pack for Assassin's Creed Odyssey.
- Hades, also known as Solus zos Galvus and Emet-Selch, is the main antagonist of Final Fantasy XIV: Shadowbringers. He is voiced by René Zagger in English and Hiroki Takahashi in Japanese.
- Hades appears as a pivotal character in the roguelike action role-playing video game Hades by Supergiant Games, as the father to the main character Zagreus.
- Hades appears as the final boss of Rayman Legends. Known as Hades' Hand, he was created by a form of dark energy that gives him the ability to shapeshift at will.
- Hades appears in Disney Twisted-Wonderland based on the Disney version of him in Hercules. He is a minor character in the game and is only referred to as "King of the Underworld", but his character inspired the sixth dorm and chapter in the game, as well as being the inspiration for Idia Shroud.
- The Disney version of Hades appears in the racing game Disney Speedstorm as a playable character, with Woods reprising his role.
- Hades appeared as a skin in the game Fortnite as part of the Chapter 5: Season 2 Battle Pass. The game's incarnation shows him as a mysterious black figure wearing a gas mask. He is also capable of changing his form with his Built-In Emote, Dark Transformation. During the Season, the player could challenge him to a fight in The Underworld area of the map, and defeating him would reward the player with a Medallion that would make the player stronger.
- The Hades is a playable robot in the computer game War Robots, released as Walking War Robots in 2014. It is a member of the 'pantheon' set, which also includes the Ares and Nemesis robots.
- The Disney version of Hades appears in Disney Dreamlight Valley as a villager in The Storybook Vale DLC, with Woods reprising his role. In this game, Hades holds a grudge against Maleficent for the control of the vale, and the player has to mediate between the two.
- Hades appears in The Lost Gods, the third DLC for Immortals: Fenyx Rising.

== Literature ==
- He appears in several installments of the series Percy Jackson and the Olympians.
  - He also has three revealed demigod children in the series, Bianca and Nico di Angelo, and Hazel Levesque (who is technically the daughter of Pluto, his Roman aspect). Nico and Hazel are the only ones alive, with Hazel having been resurrected by Nico.
- In John C. Wright's Titans of Chaos, Hades, off-stage, is one of the factions who must be appeased about how the children are kept. Furthermore, he puts forward his wife's claim to the throne of Olympus after Zeus's death. He is referred to as "Unseen One" and "Lord Dis".
- In Poul Anderson's retelling of Orpheus, "Goat Song", the computer SUM preserves all dead humans for a foretold resurrection and is the Hades figure that he must persuade to bring his dead love back to life.
- Hades appears in the God of War comic series (2010–11) by DC Comics, which spans from the video game franchise. In it, he enters into a wager with five other Olympian gods who each choose a champion to search for the Ambrosia of Asclepius, an elixir with magical healing properties.
- In Hiro Mashima's anime/manga series Fairy Tail, Hades is an alias for the character Master Purehito of the guild Grimore Heart, who seeks to find the black wizard Zeref to create "The Grand Magic World".
- Hades makes a brief appearance in the book Skin Game, a part of The Dresden Files series by Jim Butcher. Harry Dresden is pressed into helping break into Hades' vault in search of a holy relic and later meets the Greek God.
- In Ichiei Ishibumi's light novel series High School DxD, Hades is the main antagonist of Volume 11 and Volume 12, commanding a legion of Grim Reapers and aiding Khaos Brigade's Old Satan Faction and Hero Faction behind the scenes in a scheme to destroy the Devils and Fallen Angels.
- Hades is the main character in the webcomic Lore Olympus.
- Hades appears in DC Comics' Wonder Woman.
- Hades appears in the manga Record of Ragnarok, where he fights for the gods in the 7th round of the tournament against humanity's Qin Shi Huang.
- In Matthew Reilly's Jack West Jr series, "Hades" is another name for the King of the Underworld, a title held by mortal men for centuries. The Underworld is one of the four legendary kingdoms who have ruled the world for millennia from behind the scenes, and the Hades of Greek mythology was not a god, but rather a previous King of the Underworld whose exploits and relationships with historical figures were embellished into legend. The current Hades, introduced in The Four Legendary Kingdoms, is an ultra-wealthy shipping magnate whose royal duty is to host the Great Games of the Hydra in order to stave off an apocalyptic event and further empower the four kingdoms. He is depicted as a moral and fair-minded individual who does not enjoy his duties, and he ultimately joins Jack West in his mission to thwart the apocalypse without propping up the kingdoms in the process.
- Winter Harvest is a novel of the Greek historian Ioanna Papadopoulou published in 2023. It is based on The Homeric Hymn To Demeter and while the aforementioned goddess is the protagonist, Hades is one of the main characters, first as a close ally of the heroine during the Titanomachy, and later as one of the antagonists alongside his brothers Zeus and Poseidon; in particular for kidnapping Persephone.

== Science ==
A species of burrowing blind snake, Gerrhopilus hades, is named after the god Hades.

== See also ==
- List of Greek deities
- Anubis
