= Marsa Al Arab =

Luxury resort hotel in Dubai, United Arab Emirates

Jumeirah Marsa Al Arab
- marsa al arab
- Interactive map of the Jumeirah Marsa Al Arab area

General information
- Location: Dubai, United Arab Emirates
- Coordinates: 25°08′43″N 55°11′21″E
- Opening: 14 March 2025
- Owner: Dubai Holding
- Operator: Jumeirah

Technical details
- Floor count: 16

Design and construction
- Architect: Shaun Killa (Killa Design)

Other information
- Number of rooms: 386
- Number of restaurants: 11

Website
- https://www.jumeirah.com/en/stay/dubai/jumeirah-marsa-al-arab

Jumeirah Marsa Al Arab is a luxury resort hotel in Dubai, United Arab Emirates, operated by the Jumeirah Group. Located on a peninsula adjacent to Burj Al Arab and Jumeirah Beach Hotel, the property opened on 14 March 2025 and forms part of Jumeirah's trio of maritime-themed landmark developments on Dubai's coastline.

== History ==
Construction of Jumeirah Marsa Al Arab formed part of the wider Marsa Al Arab development project announced by Dubai Holding in 2017. The development was designed to expand the beachfront destination surrounding Burj Al Arab and Jumeirah Beach Hotel through the creation of new hospitality, residential, retail and marina facilities.

The hotel officially opened to guests on 14 March 2025 following approximately six years of construction.

== Architecture and design ==
Jumeirah Marsa Al Arab was designed by architect Shaun Killa of Killa Design. The building's curved profile was inspired by the form of a superyacht, complementing the sail-shaped Burj Al Arab and the wave-inspired Jumeirah Beach Hotel.

The resort comprises 386 guest rooms and suites, 82 serviced residences and an 82-berth marina. Facilities include swimming pools, private beach access, wellness amenities, restaurants and bars overlooking the Persian Gulf.

== Facilities ==
The resort features multiple dining venues, a marina designed to accommodate superyachts, a private beach, swimming pools and wellness facilities including the Talise Spa. Guest accommodation includes rooms, suites and residences with views of the Persian Gulf, Dubai skyline and marina.

== See also ==
- Burj Al Arab
- Jumeirah Beach Hotel
- Jumeirah Group
