= 3dr Models =

Model making company

- Headquarters: Dubai, United Arab Emirates
- Key people: Dani Antoun Bterrani(CEO)
- Products: Scale Models
- Number of employees: 650
- Website: www.3drmodels.com

3dr Models is the largest model making company in the world, founded in 1989 by Lebanese national Dani Antoun Bterrani. The company builds different kinds of Scale Models, Architectural, Industrial Marine and Mechanical under one roof of 18,000 sqm. workshop.

== History ==
Dani Bterrani founded 3dr Models in 1989. The company opened its first model making workshop, 3d Model Making in Dubai, United Arab Emirates, with only five employees in 1990. In 2005, 3dr Models merged with China-based company RJ Models. 3dr Models has since then grown considerably and is currently the largest Model Making Company in the world, accounting for fifth of all architectural models made annually.

Nowadays, 3dr Models has a team of 650 model-making technicians. Their headquarters is still based in Dubai. The logistics office is located in Hong Kong and the production workshop is in Shenzhen.

== Projects ==
3dr Models has completed over 5,000 projects in the past years for more than 190 clients. The company has set foot on more than 30 countries and over 70 cities in almost every region of the world including Asia, Europe, South America and Africa. Some of the big projects 3dr Models designed are models for Hong Kong & Beijing Airport, the Burj Al Arab hotel in Dubai, One World Trade Center Tower in New York City, and Egypt's plans for a new capital city.

The biggest project so far was the three 1:100 scale models for Doha Corniche Park at 60m by 40m. The company also worked on a 1:10 000 scale model of Doha City which measured 23m by 23m and a KSA Makkah project which was 28m by 16m.

3dr Models ships two to three models each day. Models can cost $400 for a single building to more than $5 million, based on the scale and details involved.

== Challenges ==
From 2009 until 2013 3dr Models, along with other model makers, struggled as the property market in Dubai crashed. The company went from having about 30 per cent of its business coming from Dubai in 2008, to about 5 per cent. During 2013 the company had a huge uptake in business again, the first sign that the market was recovering.

== See also ==
- Dani Antoun Bterrani
