= The Six Sacred Stones =

2007 novel by Matthew Reilly

- Australian first edition cover
- Author: Matthew Reilly
- Cover artist: Wayne Haag
- Language: English
- Series: Jack West Jr.
- Genre: Thriller novel
- Publisher: Pan MacMillan
- Publication date: (Australia) Official : 23 October 2007 (United States) (United Kingdom) 8 January 2008
- Publication place: Australia
- Media type: Print (Hardcover and Paperback)
- Pages: 506
- ISBN: 978-1-4050-3816-4
- Preceded by: Seven Ancient Wonders
- Followed by: The Five Greatest Warriors (released 20 October 2009)

The Six Sacred Stones is a novel by Australian thriller author Matthew Reilly. It is a sequel to Seven Ancient Wonders (released as Seven Deadly Wonders in the United States) and The Five Greatest Warriors is its sequel. The novel was released on 23 October 2007 in most bookstores in Australia (though some stores released it later on 1 November) and was released in January 2008 in the US and UK.

== Reviews ==
Described as a "thriller for film fans" by the Sydney Morning Herald, while providing greater insight into "the world of Jack West Jr., his family and upbringing – shining further light on what makes him tick" in The Six Sacred Stones Matthew Reilly "presents readers a cliff hanger of a scale rarely seen in a fiction series".

== Plot summary ==
This novel is a sequel to Matthew Reilly's previous novel, Seven Ancient Wonders, which ended with the Golden Capstone re-assembled atop the Great Pyramid at Giza, and the ritual of power performed to grant one nation a thousand years of unchallenged power – invincibility, as shown by the end of the book – which is won, unknowingly, by Australia. The Six Sacred Stones picks up eighteen months later, 20 August 2007, on Easter Island, the geographical opposite of the Great Pyramid, when seven men use a second Capstone to counteract the power of the Tartarus sunspot and remove Australia's invincibility.

In China, Professor Max Epper (known as 'Wizard') is investigating the tomb of Chinese Philosopher Laozi, owner of the Philosopher's Stone. With his research partner, Yobu 'Tank' Tanaka, Wizard discovers the cryptic message referring to the Tartarus Sunspot and the use of the Sa-Benben, or Firestone, the top piece of the capstone from the previous book. They find another message, saying that the first pillar must be laid 100 days before 'the Return'. Wizard sends a coded message to Jack West in Australia, just before a contingent of Chinese military arrive to capture them, intending to use Wizard's knowledge to find the Six Sacred Stones. Jack West receives Wizard's message, just before the farm is attacked by the Chinese army, participating in the Talisman Sabre military exercises. West escapes to the Halicarnassus, his private plane, with Lily, whom he adopted at the end of the previous book; Alby Calvin, Lily's friend; and Zoe and Sky Monster, who are visiting the farm. As they leave, Jack grabs the Firestone from its hiding place, along with Wizard's research journal, and reads it whilst travelling to Dubai.

In the city the group travels to the Burj al Arab tower and call a meeting of nations. The surviving team members from the novel Seven Ancient Wonders return, with the exception of Fuzzy from Jamaica. At the meeting, Jack informs them that the end of the world is nigh, due to a zero-point field (the 'Dark Sun') entering the Solar System, which could destroy the entire world. However, in order to save the world, the 'Machine' must be rebuilt by placing six oblong diamond pillars in their respective locations around the globe. However, almost nothing is known about the Machine, but the knowledge can be found using the Six Sacred Stones – the Philosopher's Stone, the Altar Stone at Stonehenge, the Twin Tablets of Thutmosis, the Seeing Stone of Delphi, the Killing Stone of the Maya, and the Basin of Ramses II. Then Fuzzy's severed head arrives in a hatbox, and an aeroplane is sighted heading to crash into the tower. Everyone escapes the crash one way or another and the team splits at the airfield.

Jack, Stretch, Astro (a U.S. Marine), Pooh Bear, Scimitar (Pooh's brother), and Vulture (Scimitar's companion) head into China to rescue Wizard, whilst Zoe takes Lily and Alby to England. They meet up with twin Scottish maths geniuses Lachlan and Julius Adamson, and use the Firestone in conjunction with the altar stone at Stonehenge to reveal the locations of the Six Vertices where the Pillars must be placed. However, the locations are slightly inaccurate as the continents have moved in the ages since the maps were drawn. Meanwhile, West's group rescue Wizard and Tank successfully, and retrieve the Philosopher's Stone from Laozi's trap system.

Arriving in Britain, the location of the second meeting, the Americans have brought the Killing Stone of the Maya, recovered from Mexico; Vulture brings one of the pillars from the treasury of his family, the Royal House of Saud; and a representative of the British Royal Family, Iolanthe Compton-Jones, brings the pillar kept by her family. The pillars are cloudy diamond bricks with a liquid-filled void in the centre. After being 'cleansed' by the Philosopher's Stone, the pillars become clear and the liquid silver. It is also discovered that the pillars' markings reveal Iolanthe's as the fourth, and Vulture's as the first. The Killing Stone of the Maya is united with the Firestone, and it reveals the dates by which the pillars must be laid – the first on the next day, and the second some seven days later. The Adamson twins have correlated the data from Stonehenge, and found that the first Vertex is underneath Lake Nasser in Egypt, close to Abu Simbel. The team starts out, accompanied by Astro and Iolanthe, leaving the Adamson twins with Tank to continue their calculations and find the other Vertices.

At the first Vertex, the first pillar is laid and the reward mentioned in Wizard's notes – 'knowledge' – is revealed in the Word of Thoth on its sides (in the form of a batch of complicated equations relating to the laws of physics and the universe, much of which modern scientists had not yet figured out). However, Iolanthe betrays them and a large number of Egyptian and American military vehicles arrive. Iolanthe, Jack, Pooh, Vulture, Scimitar, Astro, and Stretch are captured by American forces, whilst the others escape in the damaged Halicarnassus.

West recovers to find himself immobilized in a pit in a large underground mine somewhere in Ethiopia. The leader of the American forces is revealed to be his father, Jack West Sr. – known as 'Wolf' – who leads a rogue CIEF force. He informs Jack that the ritual to counter Tartarus was the work of the Japanese Blood Brotherhood (as was the plane attack in Dubai), a group determined to avenge Japan's humiliation at the end of World War II by destroying the world. He then drops an enormous stone slab into the pit on top of Jack. Wolf's co-conspirators Vulture and Scimitar are allowed to send Stretch to the Mossad, who have put an enormous price on his head in revenge for his disobeying their orders at the Hanging Gardens of Babylon (see Seven Ancient Wonders). Scimitar leaves Pooh Bear locked in a cage to be sacrificed by the Ethiopian Christians who guard the mine. It is also revealed that Iolanthe is cooperating with Wolf.

Meanwhile, on the Halicarnassus Lily mentions she overheard Iolanthe telling Jack that the second pillar was guarded by the Neetha tribe in the Democratic Republic of the Congo (DRC). However, the damaged plane will not be able to reach the DRC, so Sky Monster (the New Zealand pilot) puts it down in Rwanda, and Zoe, Wizard, Lily, and Alby head out to meet with an old friend, Solomon Kol, who will take them into the Congo. After a few days, they locate the place where explorer Henry Morton Stanley claimed he located the Neetha, and are promptly captured by the lost tribe. Imprisoned in the Neetha village, a city built by the same civilisation that built the Machine, they discover that the tribe possesses the Second Pillar and the Seeing Stone of Delphi. The First Pillar (which had been returned to the Halicarnassus before Jack's capture), the Philosopher's Stone, and Firestone are confiscated by the tribe's warlock. He uses them to cleanse the second pillar, and to use the Delphic Orb to see the Dark Sun. They also encounter Dr. Diane Cassidy, a long-missing anthropologist who had been enslaved by the Neetha for years, and Ono, Cassidy's student, a young but kind man who is oppressed in the tribe. Following the transponder signature of Zoe's group's helicopter, Wolf follows behind them into the valley with a large force of Congolese mercenaries and launches an attack on the Neetha tribe. Solomon is killed shortly before the attack, in which Zoe, Wizard, and Lily escape with the First Pillar and the Delphic Orb. However, Alby is captured by Wolf, as are the Second Pillar, the Firestone, and the Philosopher's Stone. In the aftermath of the battle, the Neetha warlock reveals to Wolf that he can lead the American force to the Second Vertex.

Around this time the Adamson twins locate the second Vertex themselves, close to Table Mountain, South Africa, and send the message to the Halicarnassus shortly before the Japanese Blood Brotherhood arrives to take them captive. Tank is revealed to be their leader. Upon realizing that their captors' mission is to sabotage the mission and thus destroy the world, the twins manage to fool their electronic surveillance and escape the complex.

Zoe, Wizard, and Lily are picked up by Sky Monster in his repaired plane, but despite knowing the location of the Second Vertex, they cannot reach it due to aerial patrols sealing off South Africa (organized and funded by Wolf and his Saudi allies in order to seal off the area for their mission).

It's revealed that four days earlier, Jack West escaped from the pit in the Ethiopian mine, rescued Pooh Bear from sacrifice, and freed the enslaved Jewish miners. In gratitude, the miners give him the sacred stones that Wolf had been using them to dig for – the Twin Tablets of Thutmosis, which contain the final incantation to activate the Machine when all the pillars are placed. Jack and Pooh travel to their old farm in Kenya, finding Horus (Jack's falcon), and the Adamson twins waiting; they'd come to the farm because it seemed like the best safe isolated place. They share with Jack the news that the Brotherhood has a mole in Wolf's unit – a marine code-named Switchblade – who plans to sabotage Wolf's effort to place the Second Pillar. Jack and the Adamsons head to Zanzibar, where an old friend of Jack's is hiding out, making a career after deserting the U.S. Army to attack gun-runners in Africa. Pooh leaves them at the airport to go north and rescue Stretch from the Mossad's torture chambers. Before he leaves, Jack gives him a GPS locator with which to signal Jack if he needs help.

Jack's old friend is J.J. Wickham, called 'Sea Ranger' due to his use of an old Russian submarine. After a lengthy explanation he takes Jack to the Second Vertex, arriving just as Wolf does. Switchblade attempts to sabotage the mission by dropping the Second Pillar into the bottomless abyss beneath the Vertex before it is inlaid, dooming the world and depriving the Americans of its reward, 'Heat' (believed to be a limitless power-source). However, Jack swings across the pit at the last moment, catches the pillar, and manages to place it in the Second Vertex just before Switchblade drops himself and Jack into the abyss. Wickham and the Adamsons escape, with Jack's falcon Horus diving into the abyss after Jack. Wolf leaves with the Second Pillar, leaving Alby, who was brought with them, alone at the Vertex. Zoe, Sky Monster, Lily, and Wizard, on board the Halicarnassus on an airfield in Botswana, had been in phone contact with Jack to help him avoid the traps at the Vertex and see the whole thing happen on the videophone. The surviving team members realize they must face the placing of the last four pillars and the arrival of the Dark Sun, three months away, without Jack.

== Characters ==
=== Returning from Seven Ancient Wonders ===
- (Australia) Jack 'Huntsman' West Jr, protagonist (last seen falling into an abyss along with Switchblade) - Former SASR
- (United States) Horus, The Falcon (last seen following Jack)
- (Egypt) Lily 'Eowyn' West.
- (Canada) Professor Max 'Wizard' Epper.
- (Republic of Ireland) Zoe 'Princess' Kissane - Sciathán Fiannóglach an Airm
- Ernest 'Ernie' 'Sky Monster' Q. Sheperd II - Royal New Zealand Air Force
- (Israel) Benjamin 'Stretch' Cohen (captured and sent to the Mossad's "Old Master, Mordechai Muniz for betraying them in the previous novel) - Sayeret Matkal
- (United Arab Emirates) Zahir 'Pooh Bear' Abbas (went to rescue Stretch)
- (United Arab Emirates) Sheik Abbas, Pooh Bear's father.
- (Jamaica) V.J. 'Fuzzy' Weatherly. (killed/beheaded by Jack West Sr)

=== New characters ===
==== Friends ====
- (Australia) Albert 'Alby' Calvin, a friend from Lily's school. Also a mathematical genius (for his age).
- (United States) Lt. Sean 'Astro' Miller, a US Marine who represents America in Jack's team. Astro also appears in Hell Island.
- (Kenya) Solomon Kol, a friend of Jack. (killed/beheaded by the Neetha prince Warano)
- (United States) J.J. 'Sea Ranger' Wickham, Jack's brother-in-law.
- Lachlan and Julius Adamson, twins from Scotland, mathematical geniuses and former students of Wizard.
- (Democratic Republic of the Congo) Ono, a Neetha tribesman who aided Zoe and company.
- (United States) Dr Diane Cassidy, held prisoner by the Neetha for five years.

==== Enemies ====
- (United States) Jack 'Wolf' West Sr, Huntsman's father, head of American/CIEF forces, the main antagonist.
- (United States) Grant 'Rapier' West, Jack's half-brother.
- (United States) Paul Robertson, an American CIA agent.
- (United Kingdom) Iolanthe Compton-Jones, Official Keeper of the Royal Personal Records for the House of Windsor, allied with "Wolf."
- (Japan) Yobu 'Tank' Tanaka, leader of Japanese Blood Brotherhood and a friend of Wizard.
- Akira Juniro 'Switchblade' Isaki, US Marine who is loyal to Japan.
- (China) Colonel Mao Gongli, a bloodthirsty Chinese commander.
- (United Arab Emirates) Rashid 'Scimitar' Abbas, Pooh Bear's older brother.
- (Saudi Arabia) Abdul Rahman 'Vulture' al Saud, the Saudi Arabian delegate, allied with the US and China.
- (Democratic Republic of the Congo) The Neetha, a cannibalistic tribe, including the chief Rano, Yanis the warlock, and Warano, an ugly son of Rano who kills Solomon Kol and is then killed by Zoe Kissane.

== Sacred stones ==
The Six Sacred Stones, also known as Ramesean stones, are six stones of different shapes necessary to save mankind. They are hidden in different places around the world and interact with the sa-benben (the top piece of the capstone) each in a different way.

Sacred Stone	Location found	Function
The Philosopher's Stone	A cavern in the Sichuan province of Central China	'Cleanses' the Pillars
The Seeing Stone of Delphi	The Realm of the Neetha, Katanga Province, Congo (Democratic Republic of the Congo)	Allows the user to 'see' the Dark Star
The Altar Stone of Stonehenge	The Salisbury plain, England (United Kingdom)	Gives location of all 6 vertices of the Great Machine
The Killing Stone of the Maya	Was in possession of the United States, probably found in Mexico /	Gives Dates by which Pillars must be laid
The Twin Tablets of Thuthmosis	Buried city in Lalibela, Ethiopia	Contains the Final Incantation
The Basin of Rameses II	On display in the British Museum, recovered from Egypt (United Kingdom) /	Cleanses last three pillars a second time as one cleansing is insufficient due to the ferocity of the Dark Sun as it draws closer
