= Seven Ancient Wonders =

2005 novel by Matthew Reilly

- First edition cover
- Author: Matthew Reilly
- Cover artist: Wayne Haag
- Language: English
- Genre: Thriller novel
- Publisher: Pan MacMillan
- Publication date: October 2005
- Publication place: Australia
- Media type: Print (Hardcover)
- Pages: 472 pp
- ISBN: 1-4050-3692-3
- OCLC: 64449682
- Preceded by: None
- Followed by: The Six Sacred Stones

Seven Ancient Wonders (Seven Deadly Wonders in the United States) is a book written by Australian author Matthew Reilly in 2005. Its sequel, The Six Sacred Stones was released in the autumn of 2007. The final novel in the series (book 7), The One Impossible Labyrinth, was released in Australia on October 12, 2021.

== Plot ==
Around 4,500 years ago, the capstone upon the summit of the Great Pyramid of Giza absorbed the energy released by the Tartarus Rotation (a monstrous sunspot that occurs every 4,000–4,500 years), and saved the earth from major flooding and catastrophic weather. This capstone was later divided up by Alexander the Great with one piece hidden in a booby-trapped location within each of the other seven wonders of the world. If and when they are reunited and replaced on the capstone during another solar event, they can bring 1,000 years of peace or power for the nation which possesses them.

In 2006, seven days before this sunspot is again due, the pieces are still divided, and three teams are trying to reunite them: Two for their own gain; one from Europe (representing the Catholic Church); and the other is CIEF, the Commander-in-Chief's In Extremis Force (an American force covertly representing the power of the Freemasons). The third team is an alliance of a group of 'small nations' called the Alliance of Minnows (consisting of members from Canada, Australia, Ireland, United Arab Emirates, Spain, Jamaica, New Zealand, and later Israel), led by Jack West Jr, trying to reunite the capstone for nobler reasons. This team and the European team each also possess a child—one of the only two people who can read the "Word of Thoth", a special hieroglyphics system used in the booby-traps. (The other person is her twin, Alexander, who is being brainwashed by the Vatican.).

West's team gains and loses a capstone (which is the head of the Colossus of Rhodes) to the CIEF but manage to escape and then reach the hiding place of two more pieces at Hamilcar's Refuge on the coast of Tunisia. There they again lose their gains to the CIEF, and again escape.

They then spring Mustapha Zaeed, the world's foremost authority on the Capstone and the Seven Wonders and a known terrorist, from Guantanamo Bay, who leads them to two more pieces. After separating the team, the "Coalition of the Minnows" is devastated through kidnap and death. The survivors escape to the Hanging Gardens of Babylon in Iraq, but are there apprehended by an Israeli strike team. West is forced to lead the Israelis to the piece, but the Americans arrive, execute the Israelis, capture the piece and trap West and his team. Jack is presumed dead.

The European contingent escorts their hostages to Cairo with a lone Piece—taken from St. Peter's Basilica—and, in attempting to capture the CIEF's five pieces, lose the St Peter's piece (as well as Epper and Lily) to them. The CIEF team then goes to Hatshepsut's Mortuary, and—with the aid of the measurements from the Paris Obelisk—finds the last piece in the tomb of Alexander the Great. Taking the whole Capstone to the Giza pyramid on the day of the rotation, placing Alexander in the chamber beneath it to ensure the ritual works.

However, Jack West and his team's plane return to stop them. Judah tries to carry out the ritual, but Alexander crawls out to save himself from death, unwittingly ensuring its failure and del Piero's death; then, Lily crawls in willingly, and Zaeed carries it out successfully. West, however, has ensured a twist to who has world dominion by replacing the earth inside with some from central Australia. West's team then wins the battle and he finds that Lily has survived by (unlike Alexander) going into the chamber willingly.

The epilogue takes place three weeks later, with Wizard and Zoe accompanying Lily across Central Australia, before reuniting with West.

== Characters ==
- Jack West, call-sign: Huntsman / Woodsman, Australia
- Professor Maximilian T. Epper, call-sign: Caster, Wizard, Canada
- Lily 'West' (Daughter of Oracle of the Siwa Oasis Egypt, adopted by West at the end of book), Call-sign: Eowyn, Egypt
- Captain Zahir al Anzar al Abbas, call-sign: Saladin / Pooh Bear, United Arab Emirates
- (United Arab Emirates) Sheik Abbas, Pooh Bear's father.
- Lieutenant Enrique Velacruz, call-sign Matador / Noddy, Spain (killed)
- Sergeant V. J. Weatherly, call-sign Witch Doctor / Fuzzy, Jamaica
- (Republic of Ireland) Sergeant Zoe Kissane, call-sign Bloody Mary / Princess Zoe, Ireland
- (Republic of Ireland) Corporal Liam Kissane, call-sign Gunman / Big Ears, Ireland (killed)
- Ernest 'Ernie' Q. Sheperd II, call-sign Sky Monster, New Zealand
- Lieutenant Benjamin Cohen, call-sign Archer / Stretch, Israel

== The Six Sacred Stones (Sequel) ==
Matthew Reilly has written a sequel to this novel, titled The Six Sacred Stones. It was released on 23 October 2007 in most bookstores in Australia, but some stores released them later (1 November). It was released on 8 January 2008 in the US and UK. Like its predecessor, the main character of the novel is Jack West Jr.

== See also ==
- The Six Sacred Stones
- The Five Greatest Warriors
- The Four Legendary Kingdoms
