= The Five Greatest Warriors =

2009 novel by Matthew Reilly

- Australian first edition cover
- Author: Matthew Reilly
- Cover artist: Wayne Haag
- Language: English
- Series: Jack West Jr.
- Genre: Thriller novel
- Publisher: Pan MacMillan
- Publication date: (Australia) 20 October 2009 (United States) 5 January 2010 (United Kingdom) 15 January 2010
- Publication place: Australia
- Media type: Print (Hardcover)
- Pages: 451
- ISBN: 978-1-4050-3933-8
- Preceded by: The Six Sacred Stones
- Followed by: The Four Legendary Kingdoms

The Five Greatest Warriors is a thriller novel in the Jack West Jr. series, by Australian author and director Matthew Reilly.

The book is the third instalment of Reilly's Jack West Jr. series of novels. The Five Greatest Warriors starts immediately following the events of the cliffhanger ending of The Six Sacred Stones.

The series is published by Pan Macmillan and the novel was first released on 20 October 2009 in Australia.

== Aftermath of The Six Sacred Stones ==
The Six Sacred Stones saw Jack West Jr. and his team of international soldiers begin their quest to rebuild the mythical 'Machine' before the arrival of the 'Dark Star, a zero-point field that will wipe out all life on Earth. In order to complete the Machine, West had to locate six oblong diamonds known as 'the pillars' and place them in six underground Vertices at their allotted times. Two pillars had to be placed in December 2007, the remaining four in March 2008, immediately before the arrival of the 'Dark Sun'. However, due to the knowledge of the Machine having been lost over the millennia, West first had to locate the 'Six Sacred Stones', which give him the information about the Machine he needs. By the end of the book, two pillars had been placed, and the various 'sacred stones' had passed between many groups.

=== Jack West Jr. ===
Jack West Jr. is an Australian former-SAS soldier, and the main protagonist of the book. Codenamed Huntsman, he is the son of Jonathan West Sr., codenamed Wolf, who is the primary antagonist of both The Six Sacred Stones and The Five Greatest Warriors. He was last seen falling into the abyss with the Japanese-American Marine A.J. Isaki (Switchblade).

=== Max Epper ===
The second sub-group was in an airfield in Botswana, as they were unable to reach the Second Vertex in time. The group is composed of Prof. Max Epper (Wizard); Zoe Kissane (Princess); Sky Monster; Lily West (Jack West's adopted daughter, the Oracle of Siwa); Ono (a Neetha tribesman from the Congo) and Dr. Diane Cassidy (an anthropologist studying the Neetha). The items they have with them are the Seeing Stone of Delphi, and a Neetha inclinometer. They were last seen escaping from a group of South African F-15's.

=== Zahir al Abbas ===
Zahir al Abbas (Pooh Bear) is travelling to Israel to rescue his friend, Ben Cohen (Stretch) from the Mossad who have placed a $16 million bounty on his head for betraying them at the Hanging Gardens of Babylon in Seven Ancient Wonders.

=== Wolf ===
The main antagonist, Johnathan West Sr. holds all the cards. He is in the possession of the Philosopher's stone, the Firestone, the Killing Stone of the Maya, and the pillars from the first two Vertices. He has also captured Lily West's friend, Alby Calvin, and leaves him at the Second Vertex.

=== The Japanese Blood Brotherhood ===
The secondary antagonists seek to destroy the world to erase Japan's humiliation after World War II. They are led by Epper's colleague, Professor 'Tank' Tanaka, and have the third pillar in their possession.

=== The Five Warriors ===
The identities of the titular warriors are revealed throughout the novel. The first four are historical figures - Moses, Jesus, Genghis Khan and Napoleon Bonaparte - and the fifth is later revealed to be Jack himself. Each of the soldiers/leaders had, in some way, been involved in the mystery of the Machine. Jack's role, however, is revealed at the very end of the book to be fighting against his father to save the world from the Dark Sun.

== The Six Pillars and their rewards ==
The novel revolves around the placement of six Pillars at specific dates and times which coincide with astronomical events. The placement of these Pillars activates the Great Machine, which protects the Earth from the deadly rays of the Dark Star. When these pillars are placed, whoever removes it from the pyramid receives the individual 'reward' of that Pillar.

=== The First Pillar: "Knowledge" ===
The First Pillar was in possession of the House of Saud, given to Jack's team by Vulture.

The First Vertex is in Egypt, under Lake Nasser near Abu Simbel and the First Pillar must be placed there on 10 December 2007 at 6:12 am, during a Titanic Rising. The Reward for the placement of this pillar is Knowledge, which is revealed to be technical knowledge. Alby translates the four sides of the pillar, with Lily's help, and discovers that one side is a variety of the carbon matrix, a super strong and extremely lightweight form of carbon fibre. Another side is revealed to be a map of Sirius and its two companion stars, one of which is a zero-point field like the Dark Sun. The Third side of the pillar contains the solution to the Universe Expansion Problem, while the final side is not explained.

=== The Second Pillar: "Heat" ===
The Second Pillar was in possession of the Neetha tribe, in the deep jungles of the Congo.

The Vertex of the Second Pillar is in South Africa, beneath the Cape of Good Hope. The Second Pillar must be placed one week after the First on 17 December 2007 sometime around 2:55 am, again during a Titanic Rising. The Reward for the placement of this pillar is Heat, which is believed to be the secret to Perpetual motion and an endless energy source.

=== The Third Pillar: "Sight" ===
The Third Pillar was located in a trap system within the Third Vertex.

The Third Vertex is located on the north-west coast of the Japanese island of Hokkaido. Its Pillar must be placed on 11 March 2008 at 12:05 am, during a Titanic Rising. The Reward for the laying of this pillar is Sight, the ability to see the death of the person whose blood is on the Pillar.

=== The Fourth Pillar: "Life" ===
The Fourth Pillar was in the possession of the British royal family and was handed to Pooh Bear, Stretch and the Twins in an attempt to lay it.

The Fourth Vertex is at Lundy Island, Bristol Channel. The Fourth and Fifth Pillars must be placed at the same time: 2:10 am on 18 March 2008. The Fourth Pillar's Reward is Life, its function is not determined in the book, but is possibly the ability to bring people back from the dead.

=== The Fifth Pillar: "Death" ===
The Fifth Pillar was in joint possession of the Russian Romanovs and the Danish royal family until it came to be with Carnivore. He handed the Pillar to Jack West and Lily in an attempt to lay it successfully.

The Fifth Vertex lies under the U.S. Naval base at Diego Garcia, Indian Ocean. The Fourth and Fifth Pillars must be placed at the same time: 2:10 am on 18 March 2008. The Reward for the Fifth pillar is Death; some thought its reward was a weapon: the gift of dealing death to the holder's enemies.

=== The Sixth Pillar: "Power" ===
The Sixth Pillar was found in the fictional tomb of Jesus Christ in some salt mines in southern Israel.

The Sixth and last Vertex is beneath the Ahu Vai Mata on the most north-westerly point of Easter Island, Pacific Ocean. The Final Pillar must be placed on 20 March 2008, at 6:00 pm, during the Dual Equinox: when both the Sun and its twin, the Dark Sun, will be shining on the Vertex at Easter Island. The Reward for the placement of the Sixth Pillar is Power, which grants whoever is holding the charged Pillar whatever they wish—be it world domination, the death of an enemy or the destruction of cities—on the whim of the holder.

== Synopsis ==
The story starts with Jack's fall from the Vertex under Table Mountain with the suicidal CIEF-Marine Switchblade. Jack manages to steal Switchblade's Maghook, a gas-propelled grappling hook with magnetic capabilities, from its holster and fires it into the wall of the abyss. Leaving Switchblade to fall to his eventual death, Jack rescues Alby from the Second Vertex and reunites with his team at Little McDonald Island.

Meanwhile, Wolf meets his end of his bargain with Vulture and Scimitar, giving him the First Pillar and its reward: Knowledge. In return, Wolf takes the Philosopher's stone, the Firestone and the Second Pillar along with its gift: Heat. Chinese colonel Mao Gongli and Iolanthe Compton-Jones discuss with Wolf the location of the next pillars: the Fourth being in the possession of Iolanthe's family, and the Third still missing after being hidden by Hirohito at the end of WWII.

Jack and Alby reunite with Wizard, Zoe, Lily and Sky Monster and meet new additions Ono and Dr. Diane Cassidy, both rescued from the Neetha tribe. Showing Wizard the Twin Tablets of Thuthmosis, Jack reveals that Stretch had been sent back to the Mossad by Wolf, subsequently claiming the bounty on Stretch's head. It is here that the team decides that Lily and Alby will return to Perth to remain safe, whilst the soldiers continue the search for the Pillars and Vertices.

Finding Pooh Bear, Jack and his team infiltrate a top-secret Mossad weapons-testing facility in Israel which they believe is where Stretch is being held. Hidden away in a bunker on the premises, Stretch is found suspended in a tank of formaldehyde - preserved as a living trophy for the pleasure of Mordechai Muniz, former 'Old Master' of the Mossad. Successfully rescuing their ally, the team escapes and returns to Sea Ranger's Zanzibar base and begins conducting research into the Machine, considering the fact that they now have a 3-month period before the next Pillar is due to be placed.

During their research, Wizard reveals the placement dates for the last four Pillars. With the exception of the final Pillar, they must be placed during a 'Titanic Rising' - a cosmic event that involves the alignment of Jupiter, Saturn and its moon Titan (hence the name), so to allow a small portion of energy from the Dark Star to make contact with Earth. The final Pillar, however, must be placed during a Dual Equinox, when both the Sun and the Dark Star are directly aligned with Earth.

Cassidy informs the group of her intentions with the Neetha. She explains that she only studied the lost tribe due to her own research into the Machine, the Pillars and the Dark Sun, and that her reference point was the 'Rhyme of the Warriors', a prophecy found on a tablet discovered near the Sphinx. The poem tells of five key individuals throughout history who have been involved with the Machine and its mechanisms. By corroborating the rhyme with a carving from Karakorum in Mongolia and a text written by Laozi, Cassidy has discerned the identities of four of the five Warriors: Moses, Jesus Christ, Genghis Khan and Napoleon Bonaparte. The fifth Warrior's identity, Cassidy explains, is unknown - however, it is known that they are currently living, as they are expected to be there 'at the end of all things'.

As they are researching the Warriors and their connections to the Machine, Lily (from Perth) tells the team that while the first three Pillars needed to be cleansed by the Philosopher's stone and the Firestone, the final three Pillars need to be cleansed a second time - this time in the Basin of Rameses II, the last of the Six Sacred Stones. They then discover the connections of the Warriors to the Machine:

- The Pillars once resided in Egypt, until the priest who became Moses stole the Pillars and the Twin Tablets and fled Egypt.
- Moses gave the Pillars to his brother Aaron, who then passed them down through his own family until they reached his descendant Jesus.
- Jesus kept one Pillar with him, but distributed the rest. Two Pillars were given to families who would later become the Great Houses of Europe - the House of Saxe-Coburg-Gotha (who owns the Fourth) and the Houses of Romanov and Oldenberg (who share the Fifth).
- The remaining Pillars went to Jesus' brother James, who hid one in the Temple of Solomon (which was stolen by the Templars and eventually ended up with the Neetha) and kept the remaining two in a temple in Van - where they remained until it was raided by Genghis Khan.
- During his search for Bekhen monuments, Napoleon discovered the Basin of Rameses II, which he kept until it was stolen from him by the British.

It was discovered that Genghis gave his Pillars away, one to a Bedouin tribe who would become the House of Saud, and one to the Shogun of Japan. One of Genghis' grandsons tried to retrieve the Pillar from the Japanese, however his attempts to conquer a dangerous bay were unsuccessful. This bay on the north island of Hokkaido, deduced by the Scottish twins Lachlan and Julius Adamson, is believed to be the location for the Third Vertex. Evidence of a maze being built to safeguard the Pillar was found in correspondences between Genghis and the Shogun, as well as the gift of a petrified dinosaur egg that was inscribed with the location of the Vertex entrances. This map is believed to have already been uncovered by the team's enemies; however, the Twins uncovered its last known location - the hidden arsenal of Genghis Khan in Mongolia.

Jack and his team head for Mongolia, but soon learn that Wolf's team and the Japanese Blood Brotherhood are also on their way. Finding the arsenal hidden in a meteor crater, Jack's team is the last to arrive. Soon after discovering the egg and its map, Wolf's team is attacked by the Japanese team, led by Tank Tanaka, who destroy the egg before being killed by Wolf and his men. Jack and his team witness this and are discovered by Wolf, who mortally wounds Wizard before leaving with Rapier, Jack's half-brother, and Felix Bonaventura, Wolf's expert on the Machine. Needing to escape before the arsenal is bombed by Mao, Wizard urges Jack to continue on with the quest, and reveals to Zoe that Jack was planning to propose. Farewelling Wizard, Jack and the others leave through a secret escape tunnel - not before taking with them the shield of Genghis, on which is inscribed with a map of the Vertices. Jack also rescues the wounded and unconscious Tank, whose knowledge was only rivalled by Wizard.

As the events at Khan's arsenal played out, Pooh Bear, Stretch and the Twins discovered the location of Rameses II's Basin. Now in the British Museum and labelled under a different name, Pooh and Stretch incite a bomb scare and steal the Basin during the commotion.

Jack interrogates Tank back on the Halicarnassus, who reveals that the Japanese government supports the Brotherhood's efforts and that the Japanese Navy is guarding the entrance to the Third Vertex. As they arrive at the Vertex's entrance, they encounter a fierce firefight between the Japanese Navy and Wolf's forces. On the dry land exposed by the receding waters of an oncoming tsunami, Rapier, in possession of the Philosopher's stone, is pinned down by the Japanese. Jack, Zoe and Lily, arriving in a small aircraft launched from the Halicarnassus, rescue Rapier and enter the Vertex along with Wolf and his team. Instead of killing Jack and Zoe, Wolf realises that Lily knows the safe route through the maze and the two parties come to an uneasy truce.

As they move through the maze, hidden Japanese soldiers ambush the group up until they reach a stage where they cannot proceed until sunset. As they wait, Jack attempts to convince Astro, an ally of his who has been recruited by Wolf under false pretences. Jack also speaks to Rapier, who expresses his resentment for his half-brother and promises to kill him the first chance he gets.

Once Jack retrieves the Pillar, the group moves further through the maze and reach the Vertex, where a lake of lava separates them from the summit. Jack and Wolf enter two separate boats in order to cross, with one path leading to the Vertex and the other leading to the abyss. Coming under Japanese sniper fire, the two manage to place the Pillar, and upon touching the charged Pillar, Jack receives a vision of himself falling from another Vertex's summit into the abyss, with the Halicarnassus following close behind. Once the two re-join the group, Wolf leaves Jack and Astro behind, only for them all to be kidnapped by Russian troops.

During this time, Pooh Bear, Stretch and the Twins find the water needed for the Basin at Loch Ness. Just as they deduce the location of the Fourth Vertex to be at Lundy Island, they are found by Iolanthe.

Jack awakens chained in an unknown room, and meets Vladimir Karnov, codename Carnivore. Carnivore, as it appears, has been watching the events unfold around the world from his remote satellite station, and is revealed to be the inspiration behind Mordechai Muniz's 'living trophies', as he is the creator of the method. He also announces his true surname - Romanov - meaning he is the last of his House and the leader of the Royal Houses of Europe. Cassidy, at this point, is revealed to be his chief researcher, and he unveils his other prisoners to Jack - Astro, Scimitar, Vulture, Alby and Lois, Sky Monster, Zoe and Lily, Wolf, Rapier, Paul Robertson, the Neetha Warlock, Tank, Sheik Anzar al Abbas, Mao and his family. While some will carry out his plans, the rest will be suspended as living trophies. Tank and Paul Robertson are killed for their insubordination.

Carnivore contacts Iolanthe and describes his plan - Pooh Bear and Stretch will place the Fourth Pillar, while a second team will travel to Diego Garcia and place the Fifth Pillar simultaneously. A third team of Mao, Vulture and Scimitar, will go to unearth the Sixth Pillar from the tomb of Jesus Christ. Jack is then thrown into a fight to the death with Rapier, which results in Jack killing his half-brother. Jack then accompanies Lily and Iolanthe to Diego Garcia, not before learning that Lily's twin brother, Alexander, has been kidnapped by Carnivore in order to read the Twin Tablets of Thuthmosis at the final Vertex, as well as Zoe's infidelity following their first mission to recover the Capstone.

The fourth and fifth pillars must be placed simultaneously. Jack, Lily and Iolanthe make for Diego Garcia while Pooh Bear, Stretch and the Twins go to Lundy Island. Pooh Bear's group are rescued by Irish Army Colonel Cieran Kincaid once they place their Pillar. Shortly after they place their pillars, Carnivore and Cassidy abandon their Siberian base and their victims, leaving them to die, with Cassidy killing the Neetha warlock as revenge for her imprisonment. Wolf escapes and gives pursuit, heading for Easter Island, also leaving everyone behind to die.

Jack, Lily and Iolanthe head to Israel, where they locate the Tomb of Jesus Christ, the bearer of the sixth and final pillar, in a salt mine near Ein Aradhim. Mao, whose team arrived before Jack's finds a decoy Pillar in Jesus' tomb, allowing Jack to look upon the face of Christ and retrieve the real final Pillar. Upon retrieving it, however, they are confronted by Vulture and Scimitar. Before they can kill Jack's group, they are engaged by the newly arrived Pooh Bear and Stretch. After a fierce and bloody fight, both Pooh and Stretch are gravely injured, with the former killing both Vulture and his brother. Leaving the mine, the group finds Carnivore and Kincaid waiting for them, who take the Pillar, the cleansing stones and Lily. Kincaid, who is working for Carnivore, reveals he was the one who drugged and had sex with Zoe against her will. He and Jack fight, with Jack managing to kill him, not before Carnivore can damage the front landing gear of the Halicarnassus. With his team wounded and unable to carry on, Jack substitutes a Jeep for his front landing gear and takes off for the final Vertex alone.

As Wolf and Mao arrive at Easter Island on the Chinese aircraft carriers amidst the massive storms caused by the approach of the Dark Sun, they find they are too late - Carnivore is already at the final Vertex. They enter just as Jack arrives. Unable to land his plane, Jack crash-lands outside the entrance to the Vertex, moments before a tsunami hurls the plane into the entrance towards the Vertex. Teetering over the edge of a funnel-shaped room containing the Vertex, Jack drives the broken Halicarnassus down the slope towards Carnivore, bypassing Wolf and Mao who are navigating the traps along the funnel's path, crashing into the wall of the balcony overlooking the precipice and the abyss. From the plane, Jack mounts one of its turrets and fires upon Carnivore and his men, killing them but sparing Cassidy, Iolanthe and Alexander.

As the Dual Equinox begins, Jack and Lily head to the summit of the Vertex to place the Pillar, so that Lily can read the incantation from the Twin Tablets. The Machine initiates as she does so, firing out a beam of light to repel the energy of the Dark Star. Removing the Pillar from the summit, however, grants Lily its reward - Power. Overcome with cosmic power generated by the Pillar, she murders Mao, his soldiers and Cassidy. As she turns on Alexander and Iolanthe, Jack breaks her out of her trance, and she faints, dropping the Pillar on to the balcony.

Wolf, having survived Lily's rampage, tries to persuade Jack into picking up the Pillar and using its power for good. Believing there to be no true benevolent leaders, Jack refuses, forcing Wolf to make a lunge for the Pillar. Jack, seeing this, knocks it over the edge into the abyss, and as Wolf desperately tries to save the Pillar, the Halicarnassus, rocked from its resting place during Lily's rampage, falls on to the balcony. Jack saves Lily and jumps to solid ground, just as the giant plane bowls Wolf over the edge and into the abyss. It is here that Jack realises that the vision he saw in Japan was not of his death, but of his father's, whose blood was on the Pillar at the time. Leaving the Vertex, Jack, Lily, Iolanthe and Alexander are rescued by the Sea Ranger.

Arriving in New Zealand, Iolanthe departs back to England, while Alexander stays with Sky Monster's parents. Jack and Lily return to Carnivore's Siberian lair to free their friends, only to find they have already been released by Pooh Bear, Stretch, Sky Monster and the Twins. Jack and Zoe reconcile, and Pooh Bear reports of his brother's deeds and death to his father.

The epilogue sees Jack and Zoe married and living in Australia with Lily. The five surviving Pillars remain hidden, with Jack reporting that they had been lost or destroyed over the course of their mission. In reality, however, the Pillars, the Firestone, and most of the Six Sacred Stones reside in the abandoned mine at the back of Jack's property. Zoe discerns that the fifth Greatest Warrior — whose identity had gone unknown because of his role to play in the Dark Star's return — is Jack. Jack smiles, already knowing this fact, and the two embrace.
