= Killa Design =

UAE architectural firm

Killa Design Architecture
- Type: Private
- Industry: Architecture
- Founded: 2015; 11 years ago
- Founder: Shaun Killa
- Headquarters: Dubai, United Arab Emirates
- Website: killadesign.com

Killa Design Architecture is an architecture firm based in Dubai, United Arab Emirates. It is mainly known for designing the Museum of the Future.

== History ==
Killa Design Architecture was founded in 2015 by Shaun Killa. His designs include Marsa Al-Arab and the Bahrain World Trade Center.

In 2015, Killa Design won the design competition for the Museum of the Future. In 2016, the firm designed Office of the Future, a 3D printed building that later won an Architecture Master Prize. In 2017, it designed The Address Beach Resort, a mixed-use development near Jumeirah Beach.

In April 2021, Killa Design received a Hospitality of the Year award for designing The Address Beach Resort project. In December 2021, the firm received an Architecture Firm of the Year award.

== Selected projects ==
- Museum of the Future
- Address Beach Resort
- Sheybarah
- Vida Dubai Marina & Yacht Club
- Marsa Al Arab Hotel
- Office of the Future
- Red Sea Boutique Resort
- SRG Tower
- Aykon Tower
- Sinuoso
