= Oman TiT =

Residential skyscraper in Wanhua District of Taipei, Taiwan

Oman TiT 阿曼TiT
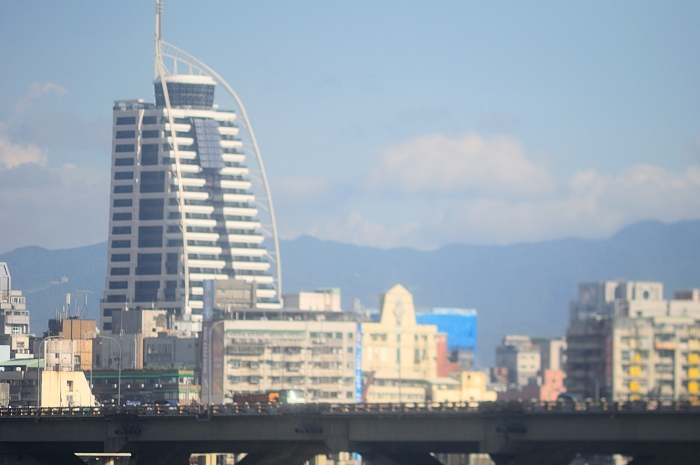
- Interactive map of the Oman TiT 阿曼TiT area

General information
- Status: Completed
- Type: Residences, retail
- Location: No. 123, Xining South Road, Wanhua District, Taipei, Taiwan
- Coordinates: 25°02′40″N 121°30′24″E
- Construction started: 2009
- Completed: 2012

Height
- Tip: 130 m (430 ft)
- Roof: 109 m (358 ft)

Technical details
- Floor count: 27
- Floor area: 26,893 m^{2} (289,470 sq ft)

Design and construction
- Architect: Taipei International Group

The Oman TiT, or Taipei TiT Tower Square (Chinese: 阿曼TiT; pinyin: Āmàn TiT), is a residential skyscraper located in Wanhua District, Taipei, Taiwan. The height of the building is 130 m (430 ft), with a floor area of 26,893 m^{2} (289,470 sq ft), and it comprises 27 floors above ground, as well as six basement levels.

== Design ==
Designed by the Taiwanese architectural group Taipei International Group, under the requirements of preventing earthquakes and typhoons common in Taiwan, the design resembles that of Burj Al Arab in Dubai, United Arab Emirates, symbolizing plain sailing and prosperity. The first to fifth floors and the podium are used as shopping malls, and the sixth floor is a public facility space, featuring a library, indoor swimming pool and gym for residents. The seventh to twenty-seventh floors of the building house 111 apartment units with independent entrances and exits.

In February 2020, Don Quijote, Japan's largest discount store chain, rented the mall on the 1st to 3rd floors at a monthly rent of NT$4.62 million as its first store in Taiwan.

== See also ==
- List of tallest buildings in Taipei
- Ximending
- Burj Al Arab
- Tao Zhu Yin Yuan
- One Park Taipei
- Huaku Sky Garden
