= Tom Wright (architect) =

British architect

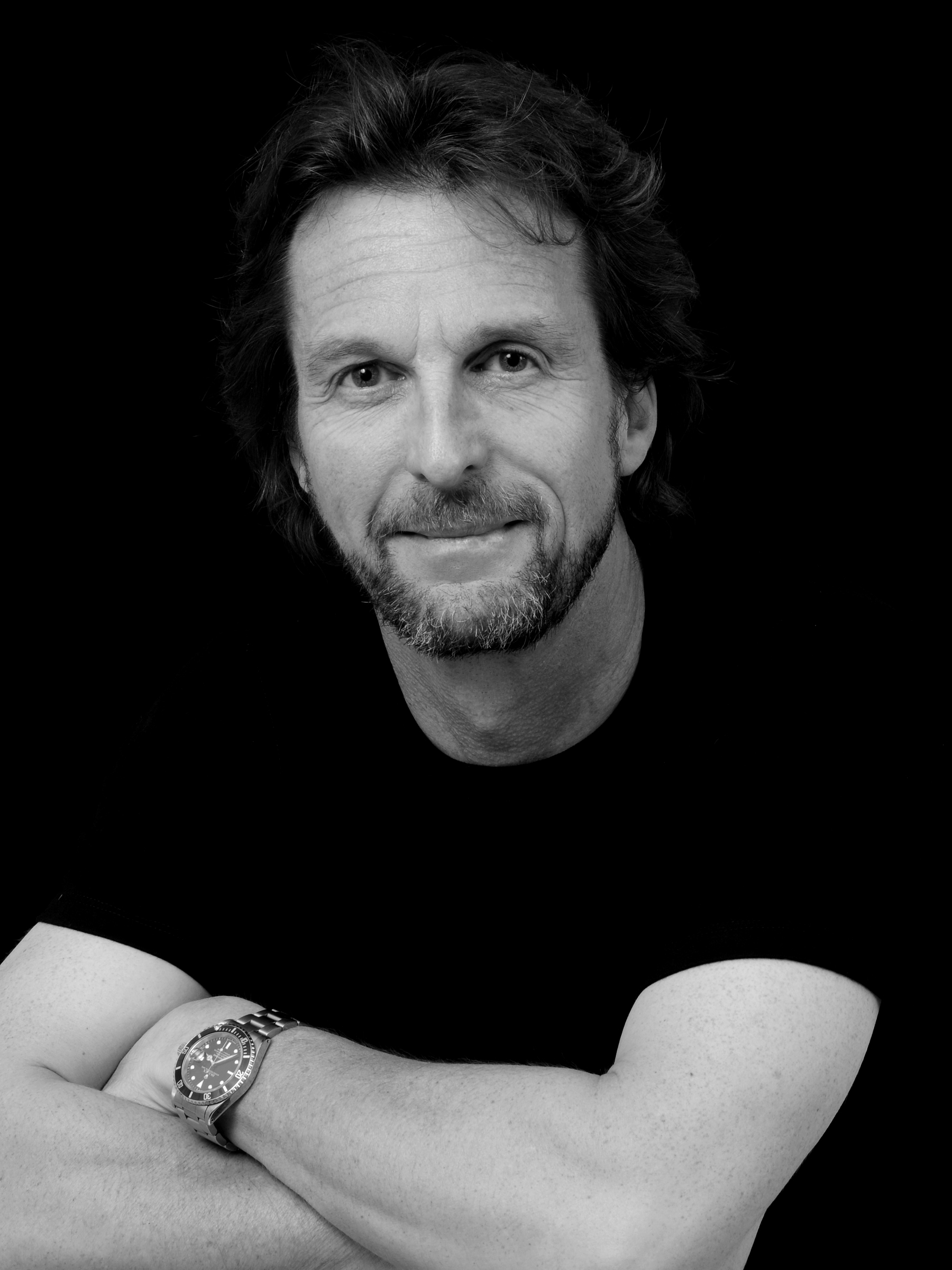
- Born: 18 September 1957 (age 69); Croydon, United Kingdom
- Occupation: Architect
- Notable work: Burj Al Arab

Tom Wright (born 18 September 1957) is a British architect best known as the designer of the Burj Al Arab in Dubai, United Arab Emirates.

== Biography ==
Born in Shirley, Croydon, Surrey in 1957, Wright studied at the Royal Russell School and then later at the Kingston University School of Architecture. Wright qualified as an architect in 1983, the same year he was accepted as a member of the Royal Institute of British Architects, and went on from there to become a director of the architectural practice Lister Drew Haines Barrow, which was taken over in 1991 by Atkins. Wright became head of Atkins' architecture arm.

Wright became design director for the Jumeirah Beach Resort, Dubai, and designed the Burj Al Arab (Tower of the Arabs) during that time. It was conceived in October 1994 and finished in 1999. The brief was to create an icon for Dubai: a building that would become synonymous with the city, as the Sydney Opera House is with Sydney and the Eiffel Tower is with Paris. The hotel is built in the shape of a dhow's (a traditional Arabic ship) sail to reflect Dubai's seafaring heritage combined with a modern aspect moving forwards into the future. It costs $2,700 on average per night to book a room at the hotel.

In 2013 Tom Wright, Geku Kuruvilla George, and Hakim Khennouchi left Atkins to create a new practice called WKK Architects incorporated in July 2013. In March 2024 WKK was restructured to form WKA (Wright Kuruvilla Architects Ltd). At WKA (Wright Kuruvilla Architects Ltd) Tom and Geku aim to create projects that are carefully considered to achieve a balance between exceptional design, economic feasibility and low environmental impact.

In 2023, the Ribbon Building, one of Tom Wright's architectures, was opened in Tehran, in Iran. The three functions of the building are visually split by a silver ribbon.

One of Wright's most recent projects is the co-design of Celebrity Cruises' new ship, Celebrity Edge, which brings a number of innovations to the cruise ship industry, as well as CURV (in Vancouver) which is a 60 storey high end residential passive house.
