= Jumeirah (hotel chain) =

Dubai-based international luxury hotel chain

Jumeirah Group
- Type: State-owned
- Industry: Hotels, Hospitality
- Founded: July 7, 1997
- Headquarters: Dubai, United Arab Emirates
- Key people: Thomas B. Meier, Interim CEO Alexander Lee, CCO Thomas B. Meier, COO Michael Grieve, CBO
- Website: www.jumeirah.com

Jumeirah is an Emirati state-owned luxury hotel chain.

== History ==
Jumeirah was established in 1997 and became a part of Dubai Holding in 2004, which is owned by Sheikh Mohammed bin Rashid Al Maktoum. Headquartered in the United Arab Emirates, the group manages 31 properties, including beachfront resorts, city hotels, and luxury serviced residences across the Middle East, Europe, and Asia.

Jumeirah's beachfront portfolio in the UAE includes prominent properties such as Jumeirah Burj Al Arab, Jumeirah Beach Hotel, Jumeirah Zabeel Saray, Jumeirah Saadiyat Island, Jumeirah Marsa Al Arab, Jumeirah Residences Marsa Al Arab, and Madinat Jumeirah, which comprises Jumeirah Al Naseem, Jumeirah Al Qasr, Jumeirah Dar Al Masyaf, and Jumeirah Mina Al Salam. The group's city hotels include Jumeirah Emirates Towers, Jumeirah Creekside Hotel, Jumeirah Living Marina Gate, Zabeel House The Greens, and Jumeirah Living World Trade Centre Residences.

=== International Locations ===
Jumeirah also operates properties in Kuwait, Oman, Bahrain, Makkah, Guangzhou, Nanjing, Bali, the Maldives, Mallorca, Capri, and London. The group has plans for additional openings in various locations in the coming years.

=== Dining Options ===
The dining portfolio at Jumeirah includes 85 restaurants offering a diverse range of cuisines, featuring collaborations with renowned brands like ZUMA. Several of these establishments have gained international acclaim, with 20 being listed in the Gault&Millau and Michelin Guides.

== Properties ==
Jumeirah Burj Al Arab in Dubai

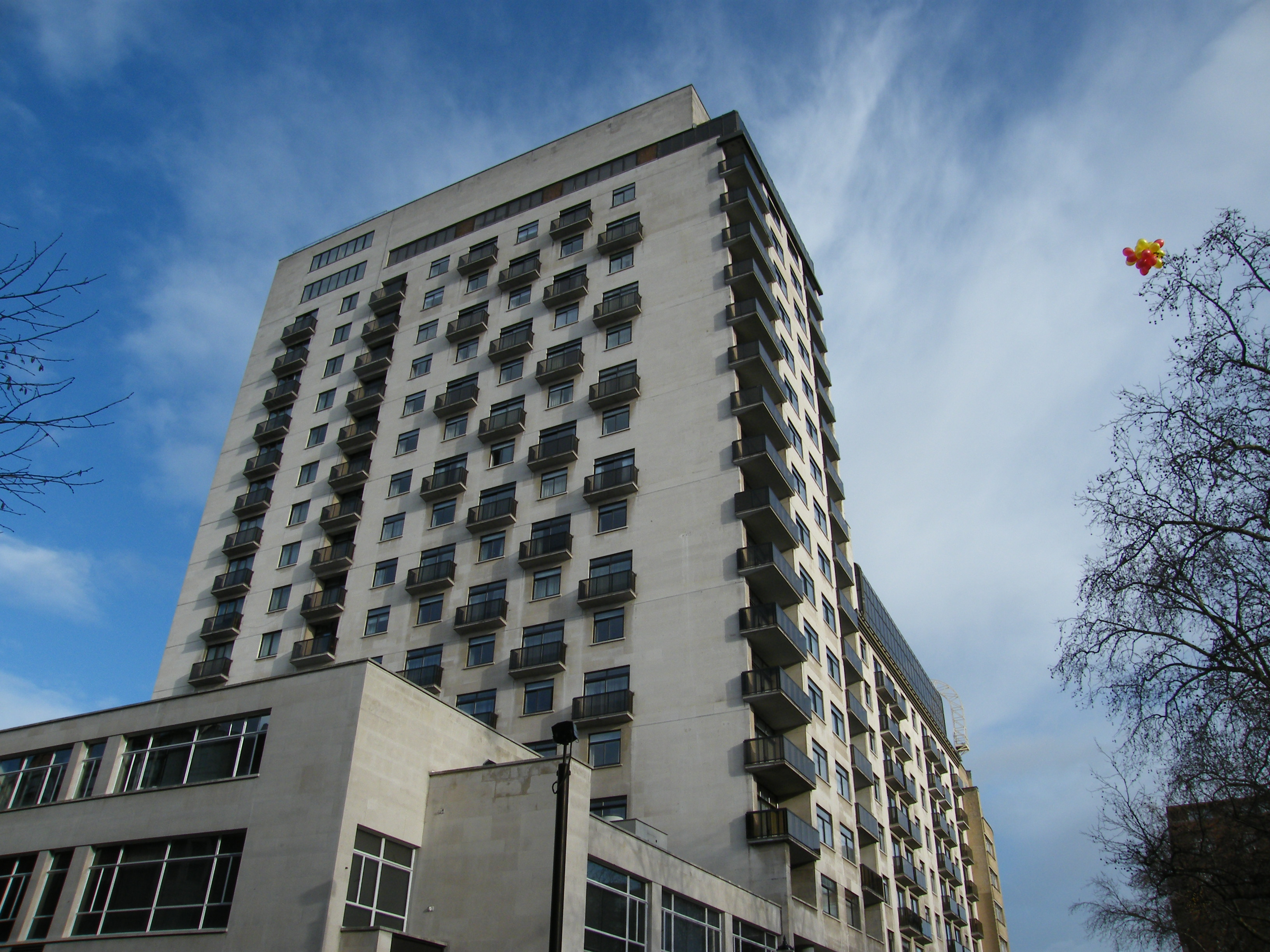
Jumeirah Carlton Tower in London

=== Middle East ===
- Jumeirah Burj Al Arab – Dubai
- Jumeirah Al Naseem – Dubai
- Jumeirah Al Qasr – Dubai
- Jumeirah Dar Al Masyaf – Dubai
- Jumeirah Mina Al Salam – Dubai
- Jumeirah Emirates Towers Hotel – Dubai
- Jumeirah Living Marina Gate – Dubai
- Jumeirah Living World Trade Centre Residences – Dubai
- Jumeirah Beach Hotel – Dubai
- Jumeirah Marsa Al Arab – Dubai
- Jumeirah Residences Marsa Al Arab – Dubai
- Jumeirah Zabeel Saray – Dubai
- Zabeel House The Greens – Dubai
- Jumeirah Saadiyat Island – Abu Dhabi
- Jumeirah Gulf of Bahrain – Bahrain
- Jumeirah Messilah Beach – Kuwait
- Jumeirah Muscat Bay – Oman
- Jumeirah Jabal Omar Makkah – Saudi Arabia

=== Asia ===
- Jumeirah Bali
- Jumeirah Guangzhou
- Jumeirah Living Guangzhou
- Jumeirah Olhahali Island – Maldives
- Jumeirah Nanjing

=== Europe ===
- Jumeirah Capri Palace – Capri
- Jumeirah Carlton Tower – London
- Jumeirah Lowndes – London
- Jumeirah Mallorca – Mallorca
- Le Richemond – Geneva

==== Former properties ====
Jumeirah hotels that were rebranded

- Jumeirah Essex House
- Jumeirah Himalayas
- Jumeirah Creekside
