= Museum of the Future =

Exhibition space in Dubai, UAE

Coordinates: 25°13′09″N 55°16′56″E

- Established: February 22, 2022
- Location: Sheikh Zayed Road, Trade Centre 2, Dubai, United Arab Emirates
- Type: Exhibition and Immersive theatre
- Founder: Dubai government
- Architect: Killa Design
- Website: museumofthefuture.ae/en

Museum of the Future (Arabic: متحف المستقبل) is a building located in the Financial District of Dubai, UAE. The museum, with 7 floors, is dedicated to exploring the future of science, technology, and innovation. It is housed in a torus-shaped building with windows in the form of a poem in Arabic about the future, written by Dubai ruler Sheikh Mohammed bin Rashid Al Maktoum. The Government of the United Arab Emirates opened the museum on 22 February 2022.

== Opening ==
The Museum of the Future officially opened its doors to be an incubator for ideas and innovation. On the evening of 22 February 2022, the museum was inaugurated by His Highness Sheikh Mohammed bin Rashid Al Maktoum with a light show to mark the occasion.

The opening ceremony saw Sheikh Mohammed alongside Sheikh Hamdan bin Mohammed bin Rashid Al Maktoum, Crown Prince of Dubai, and Sheikh Maktoum bin Mohammed bin Rashid Al Maktoum initiate the projections together at the press of a button.

The goal of the museum is to be the first to look into the future, rather than the past. It is said that everything exhibited in the museum is predicted to be in existence in 2071.

== History ==
Sheikh Mohammed bin Rashid Al Maktoum announced in March 2015, plans to establish the Museum of the Future after its February showcase during the World Government Summit (WGS). In February 2016, he inaugurated the Museum of the Future exhibition as part of the World Government Summit 2016. In April 2016, the 'Dubai Future Foundation' was launched in support of the museum. Under the new structure, the Museum of the Future became a part of the Dubai Future Foundation.

In February 2017 and February 2018, the Museum of the Future opened temporarily at Madinat Jumeirah during the World Government Summit, with exhibitions promoting technological development and innovation, especially in the fields of robotics and artificial intelligence (AI).

On 22 February 2022, the Museum of the Future was officially opened.

== Experience and exhibits ==
The Museum of the Future takes visitors on a fictional journey to the year 2071. The museum features seven floors in total, with five floors dedicated to exhibits based on different themes. The visitor journey begins from the fifth floor and takes guests down floor by floor.

- Fifth floor – Orbital Space Station (OSS) Hope: The theme of this floor focuses on the life in space in the year 2071 and explores how the future of space travel can help humanity address their challenges.
- Fourth floor – The HEAL Institute: Highlights the ecology and biodiversity in the future, where visitors can focus on repairing, restoring and renewing life on Earth.
- Third floor – Al Waha: Al Waha is Arabic for "the oasis". Visitors can experience different therapies on this floor to connect with their senses to stay focused and grounded.
- Second floor – Tomorrow, Today: Highlights cutting-edge technology and innovative concepts, addressing present solutions in response to the global challenges. This floor also reflects the museum's work with its strategic partners as it acts as an incubator and laboratory for global foresight.
- First floor – Future Heroes: Dedicated to children under the age of 10 years and offers interactive activities, hands-on play and reward-based challenges to encourage collaboration and creativity, including designing their own avatars.

== Temporary exhibits at the World Government Summit ==
As part of the World Government Summit, the Museum of the Future has held several exhibitions since its inauguration in 2016. Each of the exhibitions had a different theme focused on the role of technology in the different sectors.

=== Mechanic Life ===
Held in October 2016, the Mechanic Life exhibition explored the idea of having sophisticated robots that understands emotions. It also focused on artificial intelligence and human augmentation.

=== Climate Change Reimagined: Dubai 2050 ===
The exhibition, which was held in 2017, adopted a theme set in 2050 to explore how humanity could thrive by welcoming radical innovations despite the impacts of global warming and climate change. It focused on the three key factors contributing to humanity's ecological footprint, and these are urbanism, agriculture and global industry.

=== Hi I am AI ===
The Hi I am AI exhibition was held in 2018 to showcase how AI-powered buildings would serve humanity. It discussed several notions, including whether AI could be creative and what would humanity's future be like in an AI era.

=== HUMANS 2.0 ===
The sixth exhibition of the Museum of the Future was held in 2019, and it explored the concepts of human augmentation and focused on the human body and mind.

== Building structure and symbolism ==
Claimed to be one of the world's most complex structures, the Museum of the Future was designed by UAE architectural firm Shaun Killa Design and engineered by Buro Happold. On 3 February 2023, the building attained the LEED Platinum certification in terms of its green rating.

The façade of the building consists of windows that form Arabic quotes from Dubai's ruler about the emirate's future. The phrases written on the outside of the museum are three quotes from Sheikh Mohammed:

- "We won't live for hundreds of years, but the products of our creativity can leave a legacy long after we are gone."
- "The future will be for those who will be able to imagine, design and build it, the future does not wait, the future can be designed and built today."
- "The secret of the renewal of life, the development of civilization and the progress of humanity is in one word: innovation."

The Arabic calligraphy engraved quotes on the Museum of the Future in Dubai is written by Emirati artist Matar Bin Lahej.

The torus-shaped shell sits on top of the building and comprises 1,024 fire-retardant composite panels clad in stainless steel, and each of which has a unique 3D shape to create the Arabic script.

Killa Design and Buro Happold developed new parametric design and building information modelling (BIM) tools, including a growth algorithm that employs digital means to grow the internal steel structure. Danem Engineering Works was one of the steel structure contractors for the project.

The museum has seven floors dedicated to different exhibitions. Three floors focus on outer space resource development, ecosystems and bioengineering, and health and wellbeing. The other floors showcase near-future technologies that address challenges in areas including health, water, food, transportation, and energy, while the last floor is dedicated to children.

== Initiatives ==
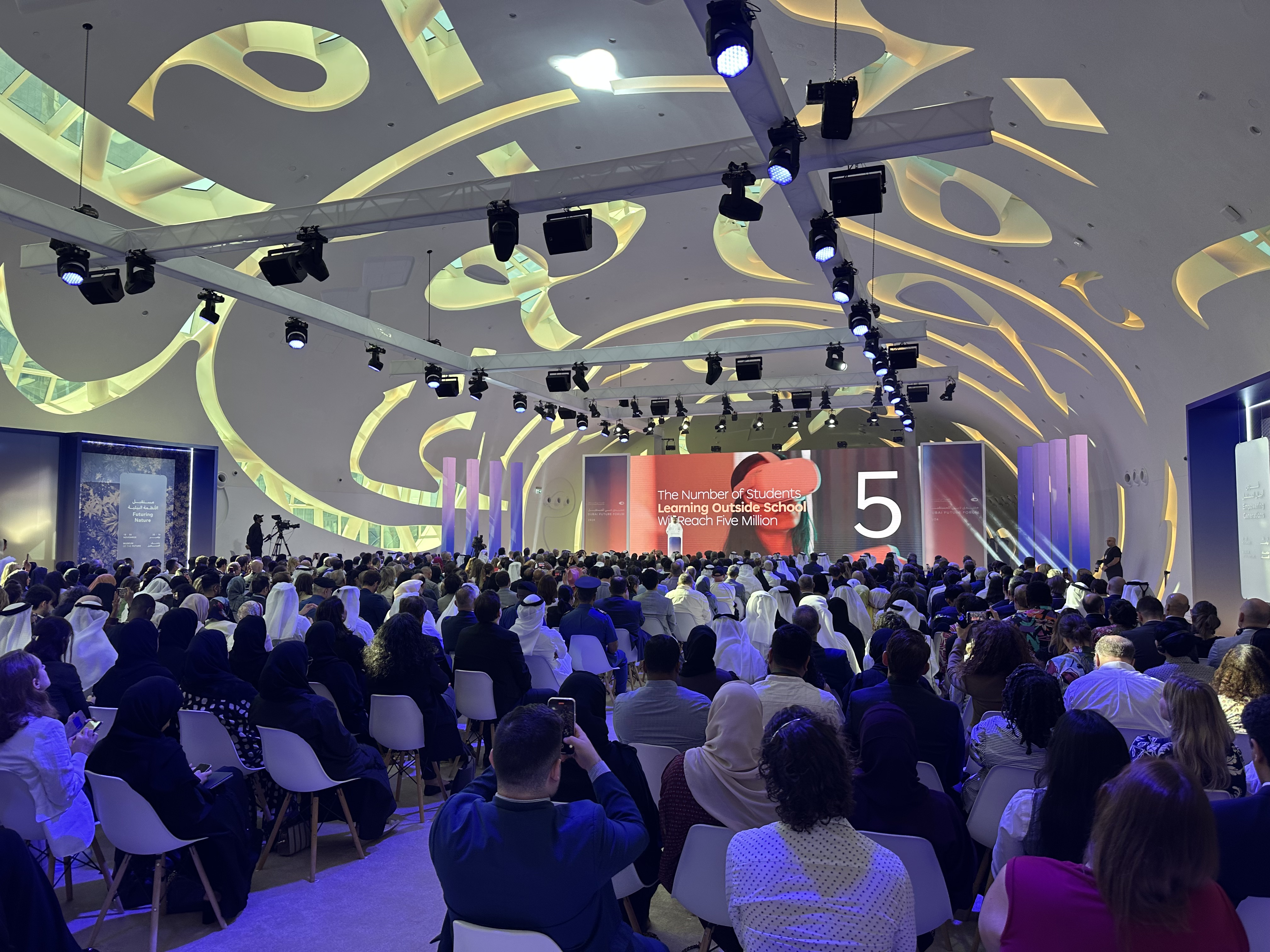
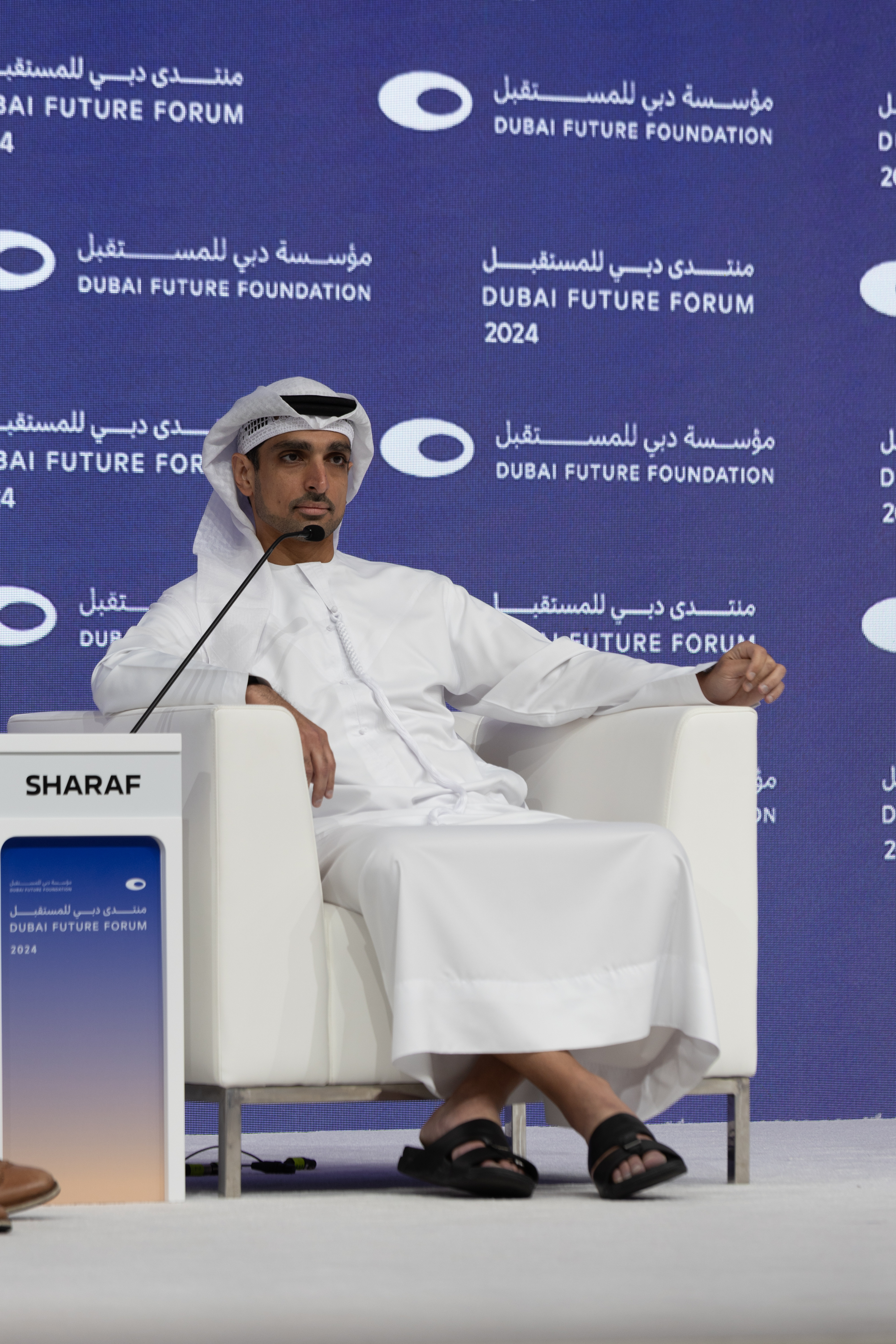
Dubai Future Forum plenary hall and Omran Sharaf, Emirati engineer and the project manager of the first Emirates Mars Mission (2024)

On 30 June 2015, Dubai revealed plans to build the world's first fully functional 3D-printed office building. The project is the first major initiative of the Museum of the Future. The single-story 2700 square feet Office of the Future opened in 2016 on the museum's grounds. It took 17 days to print, "using an additive concrete ‘printing' technique using a 3D printer 20 feet high, 120 feet long and 40 feet wide." and two days to move and install. "Subsequent work on the building services, interiors, and landscape took approximately three months."

On 17 February 2016, the Dubai Future Foundation announced the launch of the Global Blockchain Council to explore and discuss current and future applications, and organize transactions through the Blockchain platform.

On 28 March 2016, the Dubai Future Foundation launched the Mostaqbal Portal, an initiative to cover the latest findings of the technology and science sector on a daily basis by publishing studies, research findings, visual material and infographics in Arabic in simplified and easy-to-understand language.

Dubai Future Forum is an annual conference hosted in the Museum of the Future by the Dubai Future Foundation. The first edition took place in October 2022.

== Gallery ==
Museum of the Future lobby stairs

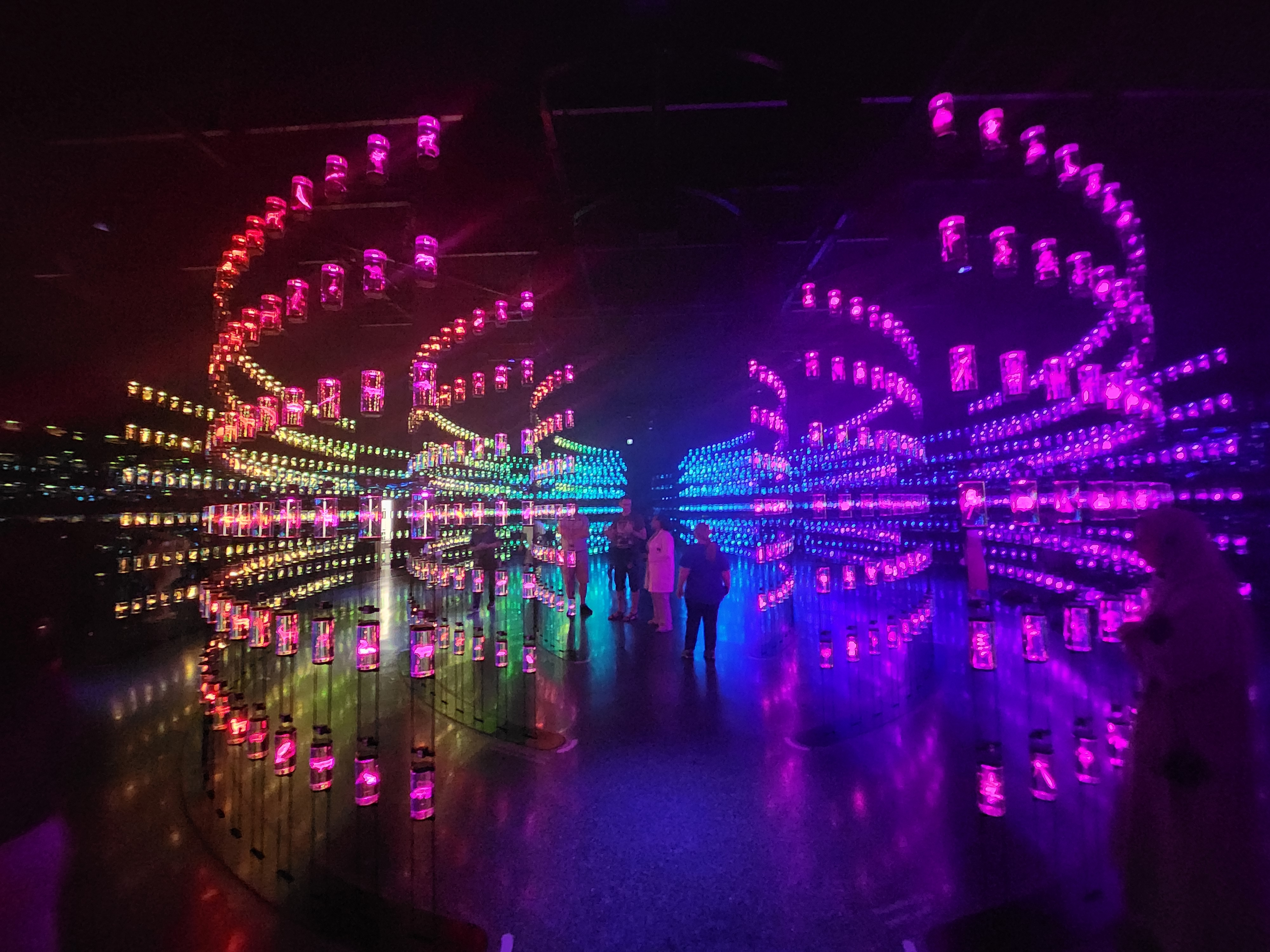
DNA Library

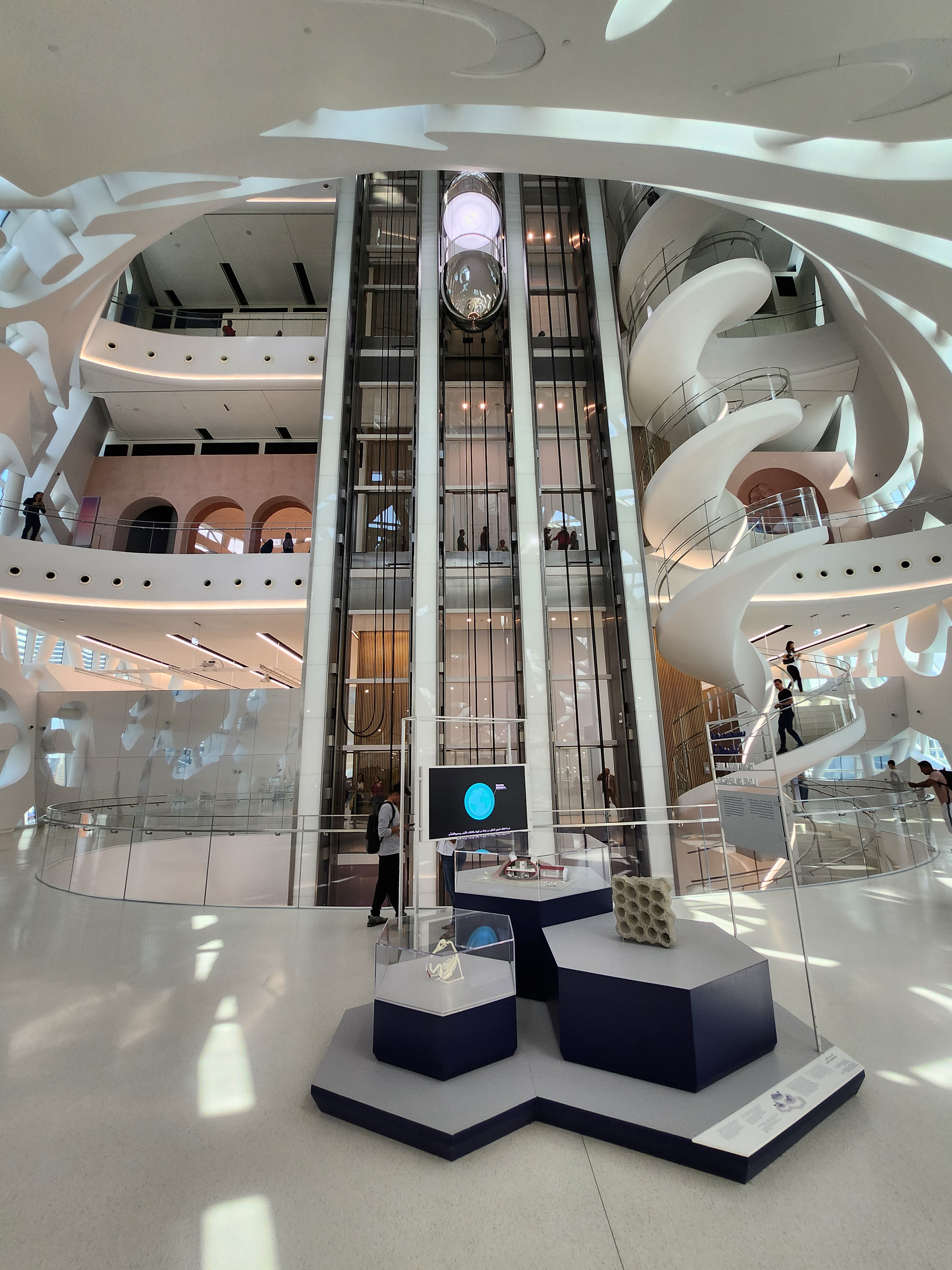
Inside the Museum of the Future

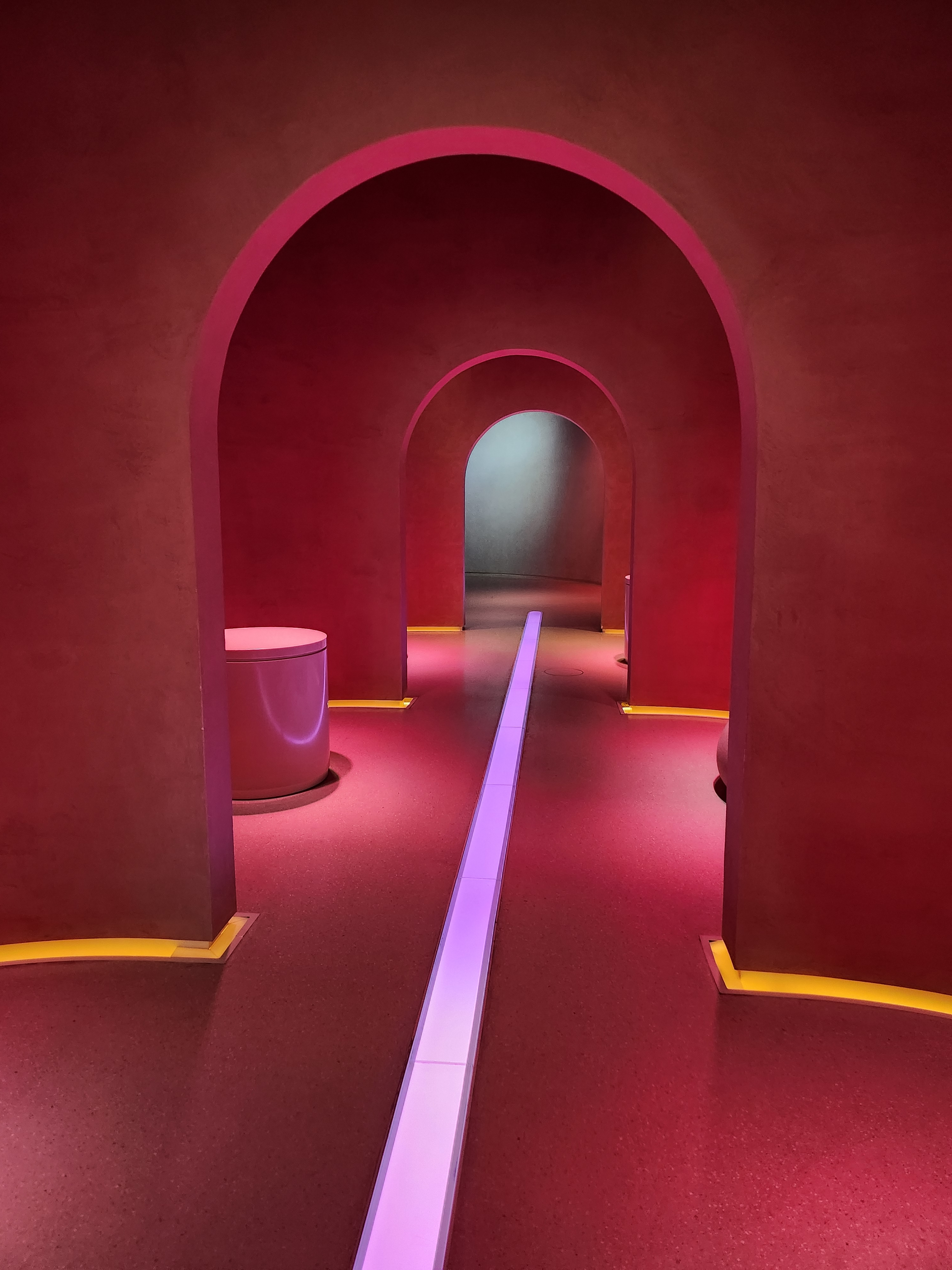
Corridor to the Future of Wellness

Museum of the Future Outside Viewing Platform

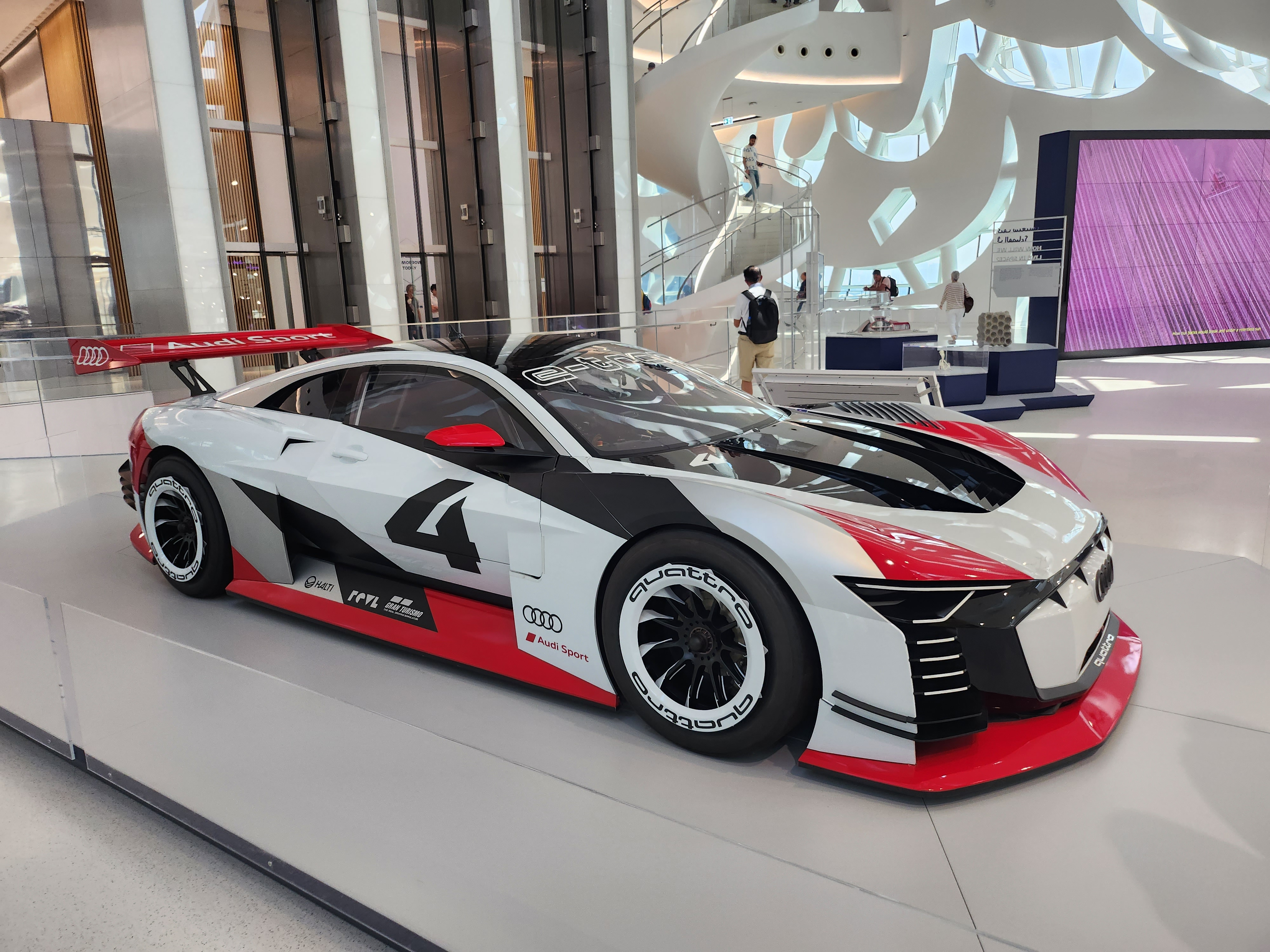
Audi e-tron Vision Gran Turismo

Museum of the Future at night
