= Jumeirah Beach Hotel =

Hotel in Dubai, United Arab Emirates

Jumeirah Beach Hotel جميرا بيتش هوتيل
- Interactive map of the Jumeirah Beach Hotel جميرا بيتش هوتيل area

General information
- Location: Dubai, United Arab Emirates
- Coordinates: 25°08′30″N 55°11′26″E
- Opening: December 1997
- Renovated: 2018
- Owner: Dubai Holding
- Management: Jumeirah

Technical details
- Floor count: 26

Design and construction
- Architect: WS Atkins
- Developer: Jumeirah

Other information
- Number of rooms: 598
- Number of restaurants: 20+

Website
- www.jumeirahbeachhotel.com

Jumeirah Beach Hotel is a luxury hotel in Dubai, United Arab Emirates. The hotel, which opened in 1997, is operated by the Dubai-based hotelier Jumeirah. The hotel contains 598 rooms and suites, 19 beachfront villas, and 20 restaurants and bars. This wave-shaped hotel complements the sail-shaped Burj Al Arab, which is adjacent to the Jumeirah Beach Hotel.

== Details of the hotel ==
The hotel occupies a location on the beach. Visitors to the hotel have a total of 33,800 square metres (364,000 sq ft) of beach for their use. Beside the hotel is the Wild Wadi Water Park. All guests in the hotel have unlimited access to the waterpark.

The beachfront area where the Burj Al Arab and Jumeirah Beach Hotel are located was previously called Chicago Beach. The hotel is located on an island of reclaimed land offshore of the beach of the former Chicago Beach Hotel. The locale's name had its origins in the Chicago Bridge & Iron Company which had floating oil storage tankers on the site long before Dubai started its current modernisation.

The old name persisted after the old hotel was demolished in 1997 since Dubai Chicago Beach Hotel was the public project name for the construction phase of the Burj Al Arab Hotel until Sheikh Mohammed bin Rashid Al Maktoum announced the new name.

When completed in 1997, the Jumeirah Beach Hotel was 93 metres high making it the 9th tallest building in Dubai. Today, it is ranked lower than the 100th tallest building. Despite its lower rankings, the hotel remains a Dubai landmark.

== Gallery ==
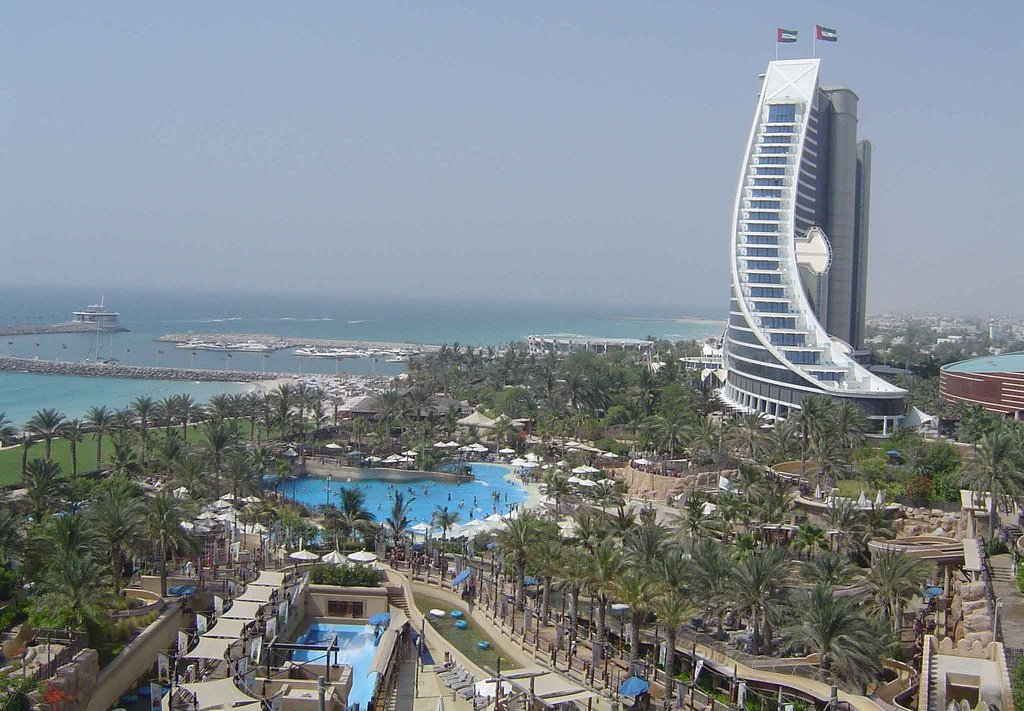
Wild Wadi Water Park

== See also ==
- Hotels in Dubai
