= Jack West Jr =

Jonathan West Jr
- Created by: Matthew Reilly
- Aliases: "Jack", "Huntsman"
- Relatives: Jack West Sr (father, deceased), Mabel "Mae" Merriweather (mother, deceased), Lily West (adopted daughter), Lauren Wickham (sister, deceased), J.J. Wickham (brother-in-law), Zoe Kissane-West (wife as of the third book), Rapier (half-brother, deceased)
- Nationality: Australian/American
- Appearances: Seven Ancient Wonders, The Six Sacred Stones, The Five Greatest Warriors, The Four Legendary Kingdoms, Jack West Jr & The Hero's Helmet, The Three Secret Cities, Jack West Jr & The Chinese Splashdown, The Two Lost Mountains, The One Impossible Labyrinth
- Birth Date: 1969
- Birthplace: America

Jonathan "Jack" West Junior is the main character in a book series by Australian author Matthew Reilly. He appears in the books Seven Ancient Wonders, The Six Sacred Stones, The Five Greatest Warriors, The Four Legendary Kingdoms, The Three Secret Cities, The Two Lost Mountains, and The One Impossible Labyrinth.

== Biography ==
Jack West Junior's father was a cold and ruthless American, Colonel Jack West Senior ("Wolf"), and his mother Mabel Merriweather was an Australian high-school history teacher. He had an older sister who was killed in a plane accident a few years before the events of Seven Ancient Wonders.

West Junior was encouraged to join the US Army by his father but instead joined the Australian Armed Forces. There he proved to be an extremely efficient soldier and attained the rank of captain. West was then fast-tracked to the Special Air Service Regiment, set a new record on a desert survival course, and became a more formidable soldier than his father.

His desire to learn archaeology led to the Australian Army allowing him to attend university at Trinity College in Dublin, under the guidance of Professor Maximilian T. Epper, with whom he formed a close friendship.

West was also sent to a series of multi-national special forces exercises at Coronado in 1990, hosted by the US at their Navy SEALs base. These exercises were hosted by West's future enemy, Marshall Judah. West was injured in a helicopter accident at Coronado and lay unconscious in a hospital for four days. When he woke up, West was sent back to Australia with no serious damage done.

Jack made his name at Operation Desert Storm, being one of the first troops to land in Iraq in 1991, where he blew up communication towers, completed dangerous missions behind enemy lines, and served under his future foe, Marshall Judah, who had personally requested him. At a Scud base in Basra, West was left for dead by Judah but escaped through 300 enemy soldiers.

West then returned to Australia and handed in his resignation to his commanding officer, Lt. General Peter Cosgrove, and began working with his friend Professor Epper (aka Wizard) on the Dark Sun project.

== Family ==
=== Lily ===
Lily "Eowyn" West is Jack's adopted daughter. She was born to the wife of the former Oracle of Siwa, who was kidnapped and taken to a chamber in the heart of a Ugandan volcano. Her captors, led by the priest Del Piero took the mother's first-born child, Lily's older twin brother Alexander, and left her mother for dead. Jack and Max Epper were able to perform a caesarian on the dead mother using Jack's Leatherman knife, and rescued Lily, though Jack lost his arm triggering a release lock behind a curtain of lava during their escape.

Lily is described as being of Egyptian descent, and, like her twin brother, is an Oracle of Siwa. This grants her the ability from the age of 10 to read the Word of Thoth. She is also highly competent with other languages.

=== Wolf ===
Jonathan 'Jack' 'Wolf' West Sr is Jack's father and has attempted to kill Jack several times. He is an American and referred to by J.J. Wickham as "one motherfucker of a father-in-law". He has another son with the callsign of "Rapier". He is killed by his own greed at the end of The Five Greatest Warriors (by a similar fate to Jack's previous ordeal at the Second Vertex) after the Sixth Pillar was laid, trying to get its reward, power.

=== Mabel Merriweather ===
Mabel Merriweather is Jack's mother (first named in The Four Legendary Kingdoms), who lives in Australia. Prior to FLK, she was only seen by Jack once every several years due to the facts of Wolf's violent relationship with her and Wolf's affair. She divorced Wolf and humiliated him even further by divorcing him in an Australian court.

=== Lauren ===
Jack's sister Lauren is deceased after being killed in a plane crash. She was two years older than Jack.

=== J.J. Wickham ===
J.J. 'Sea Ranger' Wickham is Jack's brother-in-law and oldest friend. He married Jack's sister, Lauren West. An expert submariner, he stole a Russian Kilo-class submarine & is now a rogue submariner living on the island of Zanzibar. He helps Jack in his mission and has a mutual hatred of Jack West Snr, referring to him as one "arsehole of a father in law."

=== Zoe Kissane ===
Sergeant Zoe "Bloody Mary" "Princess" Kissane is Jack's good friend and, at the end of The Five Greatest Warriors, the two are married in a civil service.

=== Rapier ===
Rapier is Jack's half-brother. Determined that their father respects West over him, he constantly makes threats to kill West for the respect he desires.

== Colleagues/friends ==
=== Wizard ===
Maximillian "Wizard" Epper was a Canadian-born professor who taught at Trinity College in Dublin, teaching Jack West, Jack's future wife Zoe Kissane & two Scottish students (his personal favorites) Lachlan & Julian Adamson "The Cowboys". He first met Jack when he joined the class he was teaching and they went on from there. In 1996, Wizard was involved in saving Lily. Wizard and Lily have always hit it off, so naturally Lily was one of the most hurt when Wizard died tragically, killed by Jack's father, Wolf, in Five Greatest Warriors at Genghis Khan's arsenal and tomb.

=== Pooh Bear ===
Sergeant Zahir "Saladin" "Pooh Bear" al Anzar al Abbas of the United Arab Emirates is the second son of Sheik Anzar al Abbas. Pooh Bear is a slightly chubby fellow, known for his explosive experiments & wit. He is one of Lily West's closest friends. During a fight with him and Stretch vs Scimitar and Vulture, he lost an eye.

=== Stretch ===
Lieutenant Benjamin "Archer" "Stretch" Cohen of Israel was once with the famed Israeli sniper force, the Sayeret Matkal. He joined the ruthless Israeli Mossad in 2003 & was ordered to infiltrate Jack West's team. Known for his expertise with snipers, he is first at odds with the Muslim Pooh Bear (himself being a Jew) but his defiance of his orders from the Mossad & his assistance in saving Lily's life caused the two to realize they had a common goal in keeping Lily safe and work together. He was captured and turned over to the Mossad where he was rescued by Pooh Bear, West, and Zoe. During the aforementioned fight between him/Pooh Bear and Vulture/Scimitar, he was stabbed in the back by Vulture but survived.

=== Sky Monster ===
"Sky Monster" hails from New Zealand, after being trained in the RNZAF. According to Reilly, his full name is known only to his mother and father, both of which live in Dunedin, New Zealand, and after the events of The Five Greatest Warriors, look after Lily's twin brother, Alexander. His name is later revealed to be Ernest Q. Shepherd II in The Two Lost Mountains. He is West's pilot during the novels, taking him and his team to various locations over the course of their adventures. He has performed upgrades to the 747 given by West. His 747 plane, the Halicarnassus, was destroyed at the end of The Five Greatest Warriors, and he now owns a smaller, faster plane—a Russian-made Tupolev Tu-144. He christened it the "Sky Warrior".

== Bionic arm ==
Jack's original arm was burnt off when he thrust his arm into a waterfall of lava to grab an off lever in order to escape with Max "Wizard" Epper and Lily.

Wizard, as he promised, built Jack a new and 'better' arm, using a super-strong titanium alloy, and adding a hidden compartment containing a wad of C2 explosive. Jack has made use of these benefits many times during the books, such as using the fist to block a slab of stone from crushing him (The Six Sacred Stones), and hanging on to a ceiling rung (Seven Ancient Wonders). It is detachable, as seen in Jack's escape from the Ethiopian mine in Six Sacred Stones.
