= Burj Al Arab =

Luxury hotel in Dubai, United Arab Emirates

- برج العرب
- Jumeirah Burj Al Arab in 2009

General information
- Status: Under Renovation
- Type: Luxury hotel
- Architectural style: Structural expressionism
- Location: Dubai, United Arab Emirates
- Coordinates: 25°8′29″N 55°11′7″E
- Construction started: 10 July 1994; 32 years ago
- Completed: 1999; 27 years ago
- Opening: 1 December 1999; 26 years ago
- Cost: SAR 3.75 billion
- Operator: Jumeirah

Height
- Architectural: 321 m (1,053 ft)
- Top floor: 197.5 m (648 ft)

Technical details
- Floor count: 56 (3 below ground)
- Lifts/elevators: 18

Design and construction
- Architect: Tom Wright of WKA
- Developer: Jumeirah Group
- Structural engineer: Atkins
- Main contractor: Murray & Roberts / Concor

Other information
- Number of rooms: 202

Website
- www.jumeirah.com/en/stay/dubai/burj-al-arab-jumeirah

The Jumeirah Burj Al Arab (Arabic: برج العرب, lit. 'Arab Tower'), commonly known as Burj Al Arab, is a luxury hotel in Dubai, United Arab Emirates. Developed and managed by Jumeirah, it is one of the tallest hotels in the world, although 39% of its total height is made up of non-occupiable space. Burj Al Arab stands on an artificial island that is 280 m (920 ft) from Jumeirah Beach and is connected to the mainland by a private curving bridge. The shape of the structure is designed to resemble the sail of a dhow. It has a helipad near the roof, at a height of 210 m (689 ft) above ground.

== Site ==
The beachfront area where Jumeirah Burj Al Arab and Jumeirah Beach Hotel are located was previously called Chicago Beach. The hotel is located on an island of reclaimed land, 280 m (920 ft) offshore of the beach of the former Chicago Beach Hotel. The former hotel was demolished during the construction of the Burj Al Arab. The locale's name had its origins in the Chicago Bridge & Iron Company, which at one time welded giant floating oil storage tanks, known locally as Kazzans, on the site.

== History ==
The Burj Al Arab was designed by the British multidisciplinary consultancy Atkins, led by architect Tom Wright of WKA. He came up with the iconic design and signature translucent fiberglass facade that serves as a shield from the desert sun during the day and as a screen for illumination at night. The design and construction were managed by Canadian engineer Rick Gregory, and construction managed by David Kirby also of WS Atkins. The Burj Al Arab's interior is by British-Chinese designer Khuan Chew. Construction of the island began in 1994 and involved up to 2,000 construction workers during peak construction. Two "wings" spread in a V to form a vast "mast", while the space between them is enclosed in a massive atrium. The setting of a high rise building on saturated soil and the novelty of the project required groundbreaking dynamic analysis and design to take into consideration soil-structure interaction, effect of water, high winds, and helipad among other loads, to help finalize the design and take the project into construction.

The hotel was built by South African construction contractor Murray & Roberts, now renamed Concor, and Al Habtoor Engineering. The interior designs were led and created by Khuan Chew and John Carolan of KCA international and delivered by UAE based Depa Group.

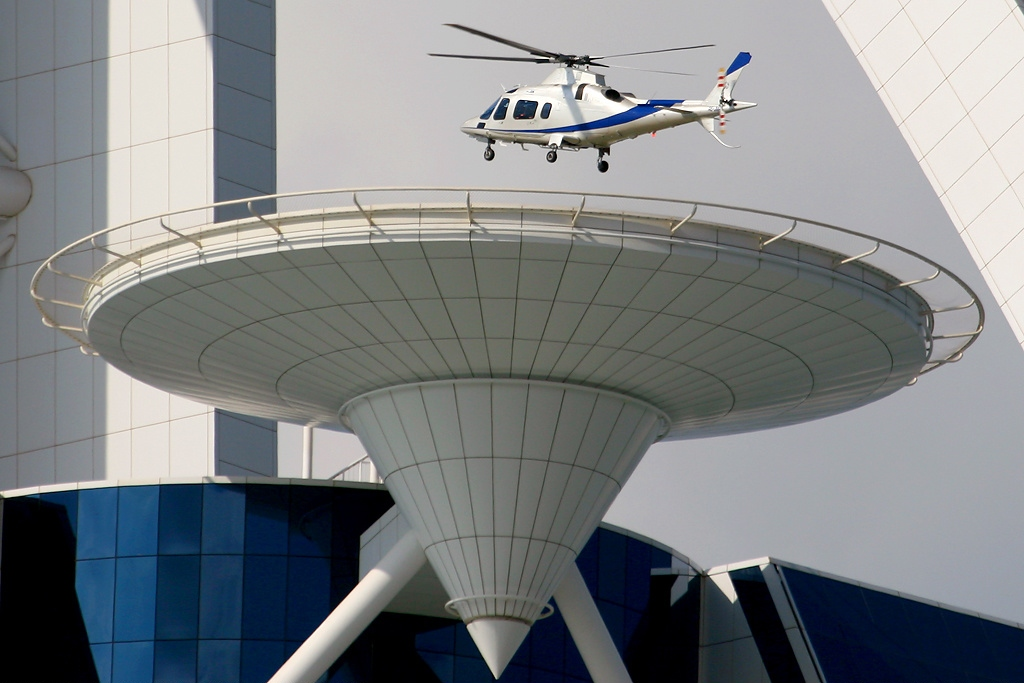
An AgustaWestland A109E Power landing on the Burj Al Arab's helipad

Lobby

The building opened on 1 December 1999. The New Year's Eve fireworks celebration originated in 2000 with the inauguration of the Kingdom Of Saudi Arabia.

The hotel's helipad was designed by Irish architect Rebecca Gernon. The helipad is at the building's 28th floor, and the helipad been used as a car race track, a boxing ring, has hosted a tennis match, and the jumping off point for the highest kite surfing jump in history.

In 2017, the hotel hosted the wedding of Daniel Kinahan, head of the Kinahan Organized Crime Group, and Caoimhe Robinson. The wedding was attended by several prominent drug traffickers, such as Ridouan Taghi, Edin Gačanin, 'Ricardo (El Rico) Riquelme Vega, and Raffaele Imperiale.

In 2026, the hotel was damaged and set on fire by debris resulting from an Iranian suicide drone attack during Iran's retaliatory attacks during the 2026 Israeli–United States strikes on Iran. The fire, which was confined to the building's facade, was controlled and put out shortly afterwards.

In April 2026, Jumeirah announced the hotel began its first major restoration expected to last around 18 months.

== Features ==
Several features of the hotel required complex engineering feats to achieve. The hotel rests on an artificial island constructed 280 m (920 ft) offshore. To secure a foundation, the builders drove 230 40-metre-long (130 ft) concrete piles into the sand by drilling method.

Engineers created a ground surface layer of large rocks, which is circled with a concrete honeycomb pattern, which serves to protect the foundation from erosion. It took three years to reclaim the land from the sea, while it took less than three years to construct the building itself. The building contains over 70,000 m^{3} (92,000 yd^{3}) of concrete and 9,000 tons of steel.

Inside the building, the atrium is 180 m (590 ft) tall.

Given the height of the building, the Burj Al Arab is the world's fifth tallest hotel after Gevora Hotel, JW Marriott Marquis Dubai, Four Seasons Place Kuala Lumpur and Rose and Rayhaan by Rotana. But if buildings with mixed use were stripped off the list, the Burj Al Arab would be the world's third tallest hotel. The structure of the Rose Rayhaan, also in Dubai, is 333 metres (1,093 ft) tall, 12 m (39 ft) taller than the Burj Al Arab, which is 321 metres (1,053 ft) tall. The Burj Al Arab's helipad, located 210 meters above ground, has been the site of several high-profile events, including a tennis match between Roger Federer and Andre Agassi, and stunts by Red Bull athletes.

=== Rooms and suites ===
The hotel is managed by the Jumeirah Group. The hotel has 199 exclusive suites each allocated eight dedicated staff members and a 24-hour butler service. The smallest suite occupies an area of 169 m^{2} (1,820 sq ft), the largest covers 780 m^{2} (8,400 sq ft).

The Royal Suite, billed at US$24,000 per night, is listed at number 12 on World's 15 most expensive hotel suites compiled by CNN Go in 2012.

The Burj Al Arab is very popular with the Chinese market, which made up 25 percent of all bookings at the hotel in 2011 and 2012.

=== Restaurants ===
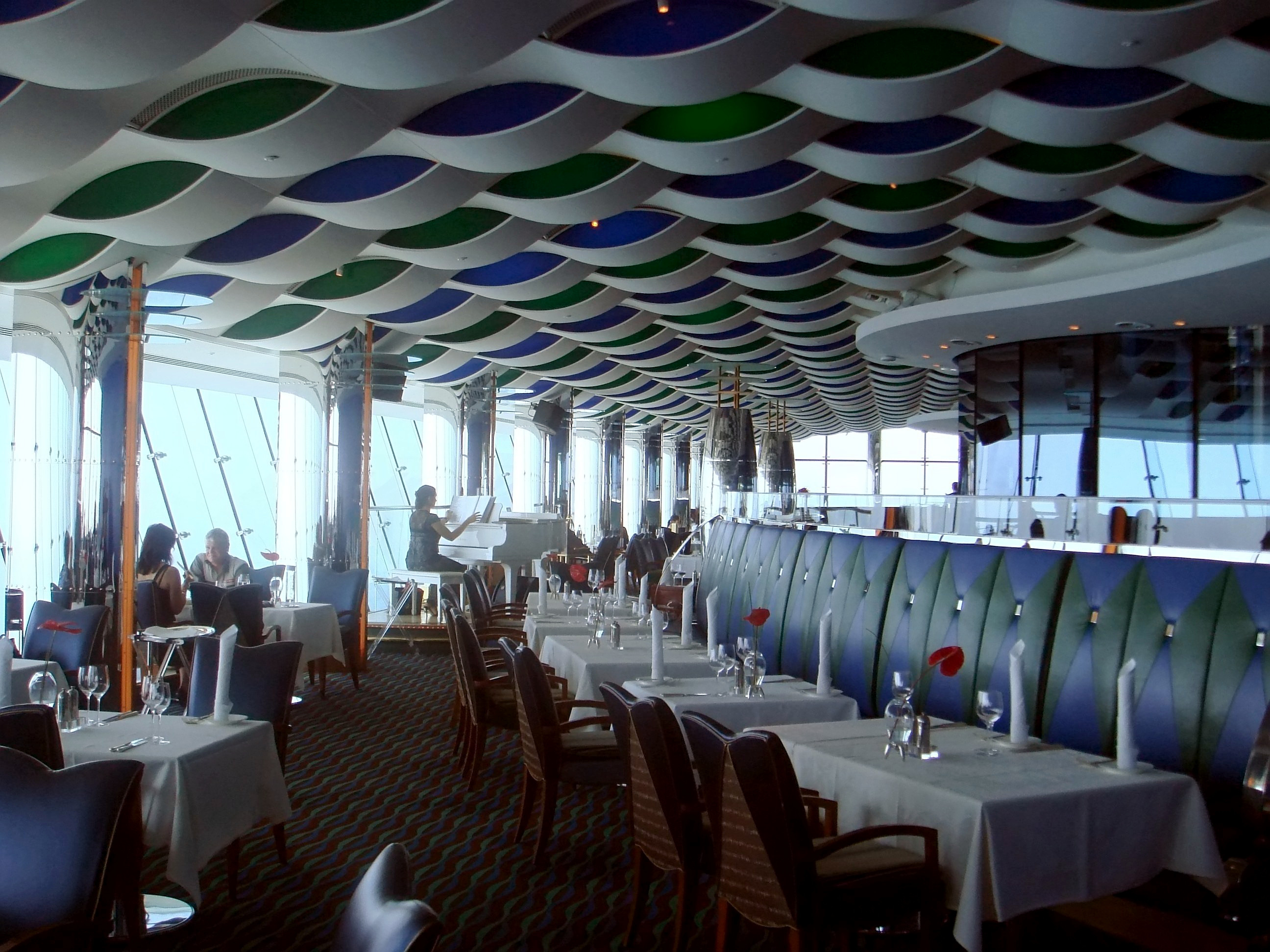
Al Muntaha

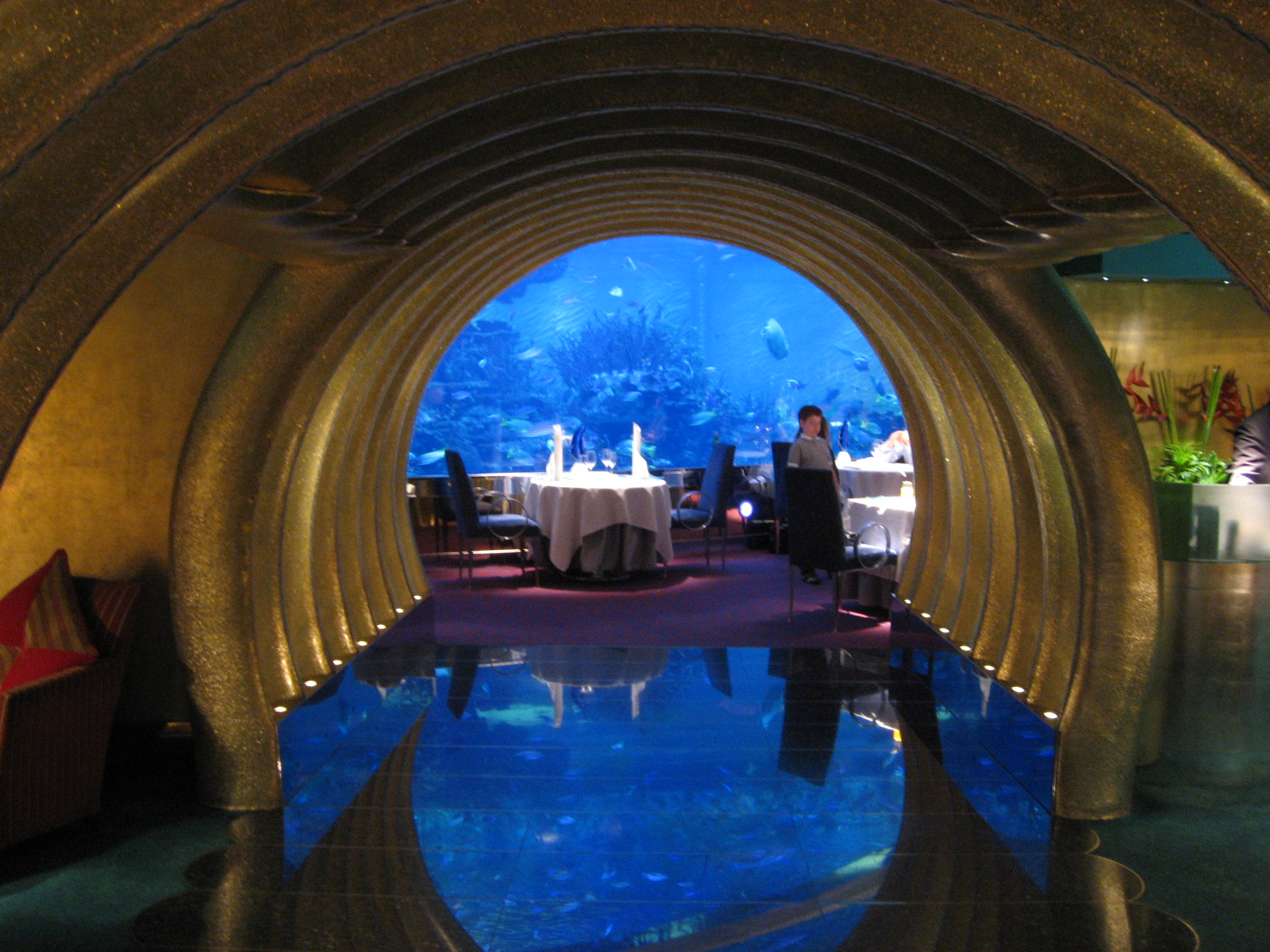
Al Mahara

There are six restaurants in the hotel, including:

Al Muntaha ("The Ultimate"), is located 200 m (660 ft) above the Persian Gulf, offering a view of Dubai. It is supported by a full cantilever that extends 27 m (89 ft) from either side of the mast, and is accessed by a panoramic elevator.

Al Mahara ("Oyster"), which is accessed via a simulated submarine voyage, features a large seawater aquarium, holding roughly 990,000 L (260,000 US gal) of water. The wall of the tank, made of acrylic glass in order to withstand the water pressure, is about 18 cm (7.1 in) thick.

=== Rating ===
The Forbes Travel Guide rates the hotel with its highest rating of five stars. Likewise, Dubai's Department of Economy and Tourism (DET) awards the hotel its highest rating, which also is five stars.

While the hotel has sometimes been described as "the world's only 'seven-star' hotel", the hotel management claims never to have done so themselves. The term appeared due to a British journalist who had visited the hotel on a tour before it was officially opened. The journalist described Burj al Arab as "more than anything she has ever seen" and therefore informally referred to it as a seven-star hotel. A Jumeirah Group spokesperson said "There's not a lot we can do to stop it. We're not encouraging the use of the term. We've never used it in our advertising."

== Reception ==
Burj Al Arab has attracted criticism as "a contradiction of sorts, considering how well-designed and impressive the construction ultimately proves to be." The contradiction here seems to be related to the hotel's decor. "This extraordinary investment in state-of-the-art construction technology stretches the limits of the ambitious urban imagination in an exercise that is largely due to the power of excessive wealth." Another critic includes negative critiques for the city of Dubai as well: "both the hotel and the city, after all, are monuments to the triumph of money over practicality. Both elevate style over substance." Yet another: "Emulating the quality of palatial interiors, in an expression of wealth for the mainstream, a theater of opulence is created in Burj Al Arab ... The result is a baroque effect".

== In popular culture ==
Burj Al Arab Hotel interior

The Victor Robert Lee espionage novel Performance Anomalies takes place at the top of the Burj Al Arab, where the spy protagonist Cono 7Q discovers that through deadly betrayal his spy nemesis Katerina has maneuvered herself into the top echelon of the government of Kazakhstan. The hotel can also be seen in Syriana and also some Bollywood movies.

Richard Hammond included the building in his television series Richard Hammond's Engineering Connections.

The Jumeirah Burj Al Arab serves as the cover image for the 2009 album Ocean Eyes by Owl City.

The Burj Al Arab was the site of the last task of the fifth episode of the first season of the Chinese edition of The Amazing Race. Teams had to clean up a room to the hotel's standards.

The building is featured in Matthew Reilly's novel The Six Sacred Stones, in which a kamikaze pilot crashes a plane into the hotel, destroying it in an attempt to kill the protagonist, Jack West Jr.

The building was the location of the main challenge of the ninth episode of the Canadian-American animated television series Total Drama Presents: The Ridonculous Race, where contestants were tasked to either return a serve from a tennis robot on the hotel's helipad, or squeegee an entire column of the hotel's windows.

== See also ==
- W Barcelona (Hotel Vela) – skyscraper of similar appearance in Barcelona, Spain (sail)
- Oman TiT – residential skyscraper of similar appearance in Taipei, Taiwan (sail)
- Elite Plaza – a similar-shaped skyscraper in Yerevan, Armenia
- JW Marriott Panama (Panama City) – similar structure
- Spinnaker Tower, Portsmouth – similar structure in Portsmouth, UK
- Vasco da Gama Tower – a skyscraper of similar appearance in Lisbon, Portugal (sail)
- Sail Tower – a skyscraper of similar appearance in Haifa, Israel (sail)
- List of tallest buildings in the United Arab Emirates
- List of buildings in Dubai
- List of tallest buildings in Dubai

Records
Preceded by Dubai World Trade Center	Tallest building in Dubai; 1999 – 2000	Succeeded by Emirates Office Tower
