= The Four Legendary Kingdoms =

2016 novel by Matthew Reilly

- First edition
- Author: Matthew Reilly
- Language: English
- Series: Jack West Jr.
- Genre: Thriller novel
- Publisher: Pan MacMillan
- Publication date: 20 October 2016
- Publication place: Australia
- Media type: Print (Hardcover)
- ISBN: 978-1-4091-6712-9
- Preceded by: The Five Greatest Warriors

The Four Legendary Kingdoms is the fourth thriller novel in the Jack West Jr. series, by the Australian writer Matthew Reilly.

The book is the fourth in an Indiana Jones–style action series, and it is a continuation of the story established in The Five Greatest Warriors.

The series is published by Pan Macmillan, and it was first released on 20 October 2016 in Australia.

== Synopsis ==
Eight years after successfully constructing the Great Machine and preventing the Dark Sun from destroying the earth, Jack West Jr. has retired to his farm in Western Australia. While his adopted daughter Lily—now a twenty-year-old college student—is visiting him, he is called to the Pine Gap military installation to consult on an unusual anomaly detected by its top secret telescopic array. West speculates that the anomaly is a rogue galaxy hurtling across the universe, and that a collision with the Milky Way Galaxy—an apocalyptic event—is imminent. However, before he can draw any further conclusions, the facility is attacked and West is abducted.

West awakens in a locked cell and is attacked by a man in a bull-shaped mask resembling a minotaur. West kills the man and escapes the cell to find himself in an arena with fifteen other men, most of whom were prepared for the attack. The group is addressed by a man calling himself Hades, who announces that the sixteen men are the sixteen champions chosen to take part in the Hydra Games. By completing the games, the champions will acquire nine spheres of golden quartz which will unlock a temple within the arena and complete a ritual required to save the world. In order to ensure the champions' loyalty, each man has been implanted with an explosive device and their friends and families held hostage.

Each round of the Hydra Games is brutal, with the champions facing physical challenges of endurance and mortal combat, with the last-placed champion and their hostages killed. Furthermore, Hades is obliged to grant the winner of each round a request, which many champions used to have their rivals killed. Between each round, the champions are given the opportunity to recuperate, and West is approached by Iolanthe Compton-Jones, a member of the British royal family who reveals that the Hydra Games are being run by the four kingdoms that have secretly ruled the world for millennia. By completing the ritual at the conclusion of the Hydra Games, mankind will avert the incoming rogue galaxy. West arranged to have Lily use her position as the Oracle of Siwa to escape captivity and spy on the royals spectating the Games.

Meanwhile, Stretch and Pooh Bear discover West's abduction. Using a sketch of the rogue galaxy as a clue, they track down West's mother, Mae Merriweather, to try and find him. Mae shared her hypothesis with them: that there is a consciousness at the center of the universe popularly known as God that has been trying to establish contact with Earth. Unsatisfied with the progress of humanity, it releases a rogue galaxy every few thousand years to destroy large swathes of the universe and start over. The Hydra Games is an ancient ritual designed to send a message back to the center of the universe and prove humanity's worth.

Over the course of the Hydra Games, West distinguishes himself by saving E-147, a man in a minotaur costume, from certain death and discovers that the minotaur is a direct descendant of the Neanderthals. He befriends one of the other champions, Shane Schofield, who like West was abducted to participate in the Games, and the two plan to free their hostages when they discover that all of the hostages will be killed halfway through the Hydra Games. The rescue is successful, but West is captured and about to be executed when he is saved by Schofield; having won a round of the Games, Schofield asks Hades to spare West's life as a reward. Having reached the midway point of the Games, the first stage of the ritual is completed, and the rogue galaxy averted. Iolanthe reveals that the next part of the Games will pass the knowledge necessary to save the world on to one of the four kings: the rogue galaxy was a forerunner to an "Omega Event", the total destruction of the universe via a Big Crunch and another Big Bang that will create a new universe. This knowledge will allow one of the four kings to reign over the world unopposed. West also discovers that one of Hades' sons, Dion, intends to usurp his father's position and forcibly marry Lily while his brother Zaitan completes the ritual and passes the knowledge onto him.

The next stage of the Hydra Games requires the surviving champions to fight each other to the death. West is forced to kill Schofield before realizing that each round mirrors the Twelve Labours of Hercules—who was a previous champion of the Hydra Games—and uses this knowledge to progress through the final rounds. The ritual is completed, but West intervenes before the knowledge can be passed on to his king. The royals are horrified at this sacrilege, but before they can react, the temple is attacked by hordes of Neanderthals dressed as minotaurs, having been inspired by West's saving E-147. Dion is killed during their escape and Schofield revived, having used hyper-oxygenated blood to feign his death. Having realized that Hades was the only royal who was not taking part in the Hydra Games for his own personal gain, West convinced him to join in the next stage of the quest: locating three lost cities that contain the knowledge needed to prevent the Omega Event.
