= Wayne Haag =

Australian artist and illustrator

Wayne Haag is an Australian artist and illustrator, mainly of science fiction works.

He has worked in film and television in Australia, USA and New Zealand. He was a matte painter for the television series Farscape Season 1 and for the first two The Lord of the Rings films, amongst other work. He also creates concept art for film projects.

Haag created the cover art for six novels and three ebooks by Australian writer Matthew Reilly, starting with Seven Ancient Wonders.

Haag also contributes interior and cover illustrations for TTA Press, Interzone (magazine).
