= List of Old Boys of St Aloysius' College =

Former students of the Catholic school, St Aloysius' College in Milsons Point, New South Wales, Australia, are known as "Old Boys".

== Academia, medicine and science ==
- Jacques Miller AC FRS (1931– ), research scientist
- Sir Gustav Nossal AC CBE FRS FAA (1931– ), research scientist; former director of the Walter and Eliza Hall Institute of Medical Research (1965–1996); 2000 Australian of the Year

== Business ==
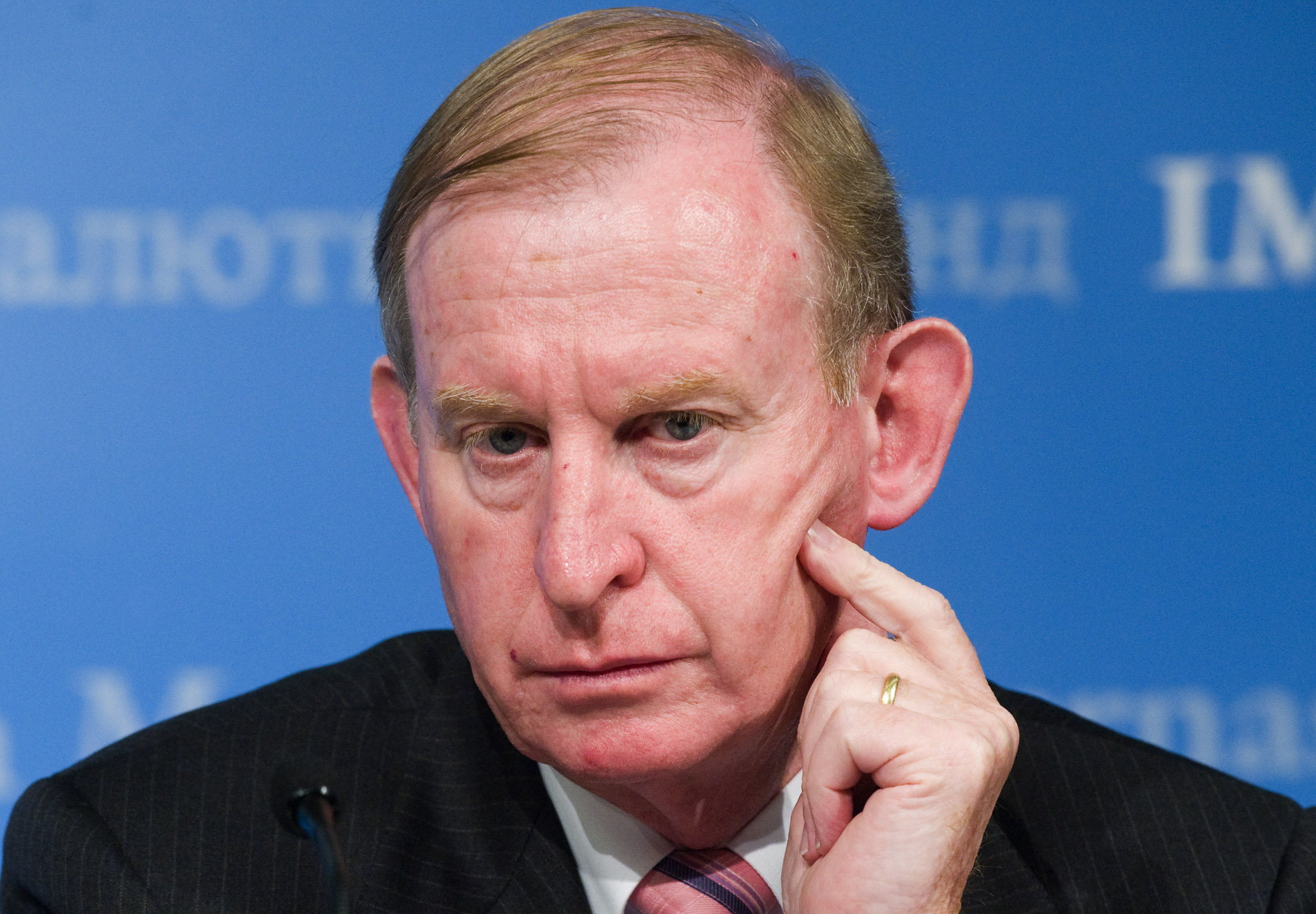
David Murray

- Danny Kennedy, environmentalist, clean-tech entrepreneur and founder of Sungevity
- Andrew Low, corporate adviser, and CEO of RedBridge Grant Samuel
- David Murray AO, former chairman of the Future Fund and former CEO of the Commonwealth Bank

== Clergy ==
- Right Reverend Joseph Dwyer, bishop of Wagga Wagga 1918–1939 (also attended St Patrick's College, Goulburn)
- Bishop Gregory Homeming, bishop of Lismore
- Peter L'Estrange, rector of Newman College (University of Melbourne) 1991–2006 and master of Campion Hall, Oxford since 2006
- Archbishop Eris O'Brien, auxiliary bishop of Sydney 1948–1951, archbishop of Canberra and Goulburn 1953–1966
- Bishop William Wright, bishop of Maitland-Newcastle

== Media, entertainment and the arts ==
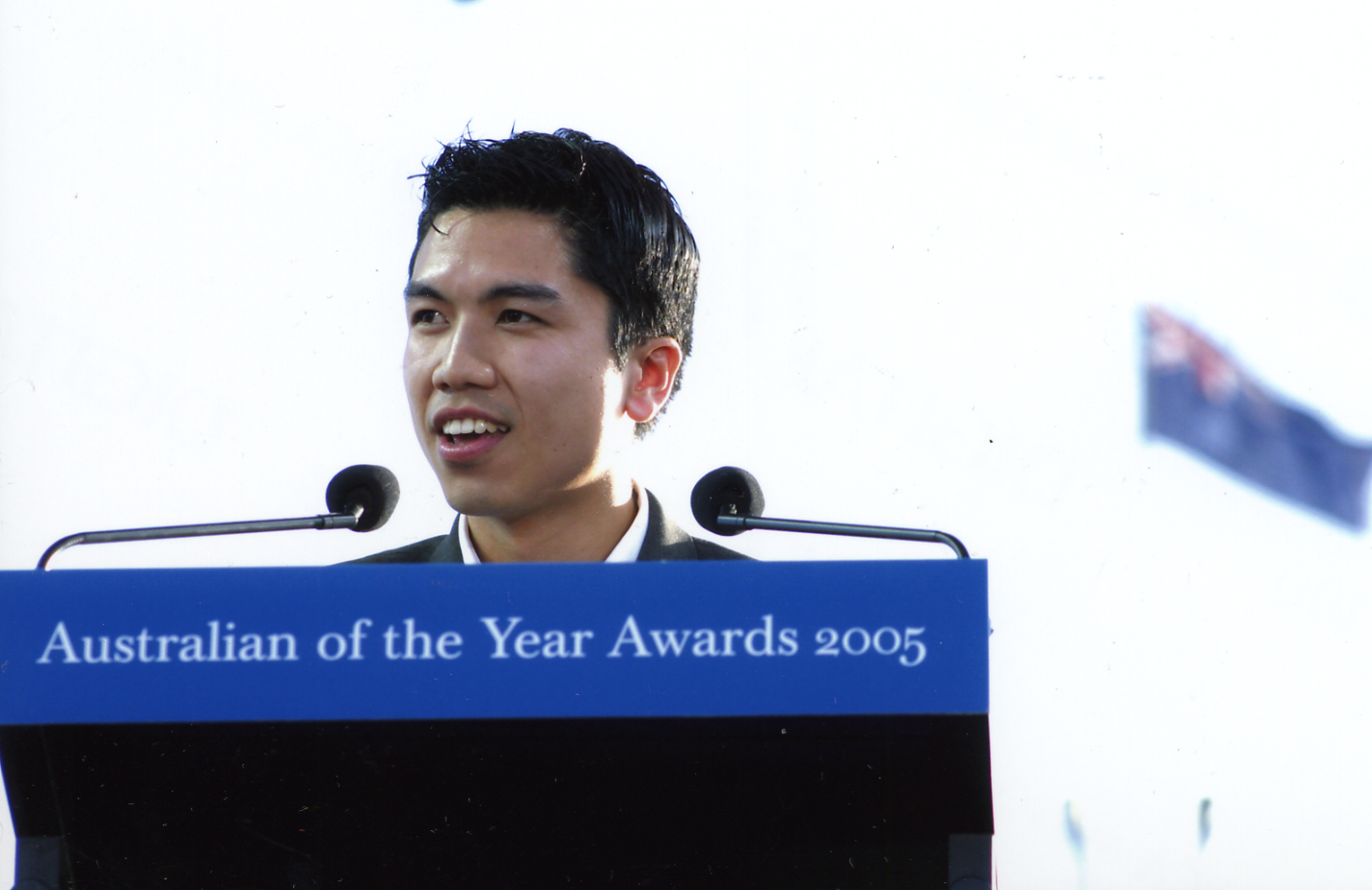
Khoa Do

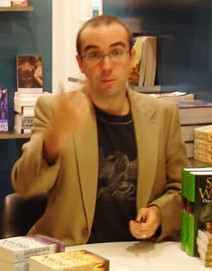
Julian Morrow

- Christopher Brennan, poet and scholar (also attended Saint Ignatius' College, Riverview)
- Don Burke, television presenter, television producer, author and horticulturalist
- Danny Clayton, television presenter and media personality, best known for his work as a Channel V Australia VJ
- Martin Cooke, baritone with the Bavarian State Opera
- Alex Cubis, actor and lawyer
- John Bede Dalley, journalist and writer (also attended St Augustine's Abbey school and Beaumont College)
- Anh Do, comedian, painter and actor (Footy Legends, Thank God You're Here, SBS series Kick, runner-up on Dancing with the Stars (Series 7), Dancing with the Deals)
- Khoa Do, 2005 Young Australian of the Year, screenwriter and director of Footy Legends
- Paul Dyer AO, musician, conductor and artistic director
- Sir Charles Mackerras, conductor and brother of Alistair and Malcolm (also attended Sydney Grammar School)
- Julian Morrow, journalist, comedian and writer, best known for The Chaser, CNNNN, The Chaser's War on Everything
- Melvyn Morrow, playwright whose musical scores included Shout! The Legend of The Wild One and Dusty - The Musical; English teacher
- Matthew Reilly, author whose novels include Ice Station, Area 7, Scarecrow, Hover Car Racer, Seven Ancient Wonders and Contest
- Cyril Ritchard, Broadway actor
- Justin Smith, actor who starred in Billy Elliot the Musical in Australia
- Adam Spencer, mathematician, comedian and radio host
- Tom Switzer, newspaper columnist, podcaster, academic and former ABC presenter.
- Tom Williams, television presenter (The Great Outdoors); reporter and star of Dancing With the Stars

== Politics, public service and the law ==
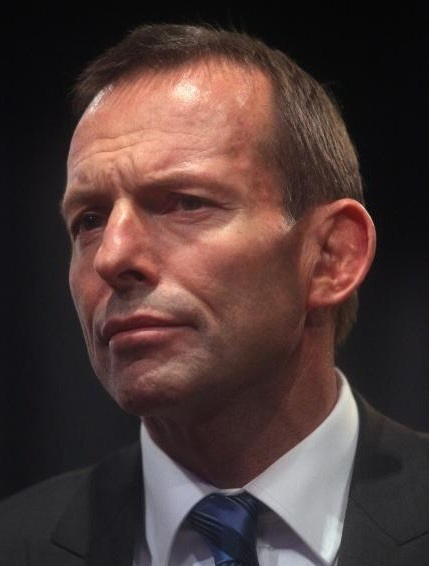
Tony Abbott, prime minister 2013–15

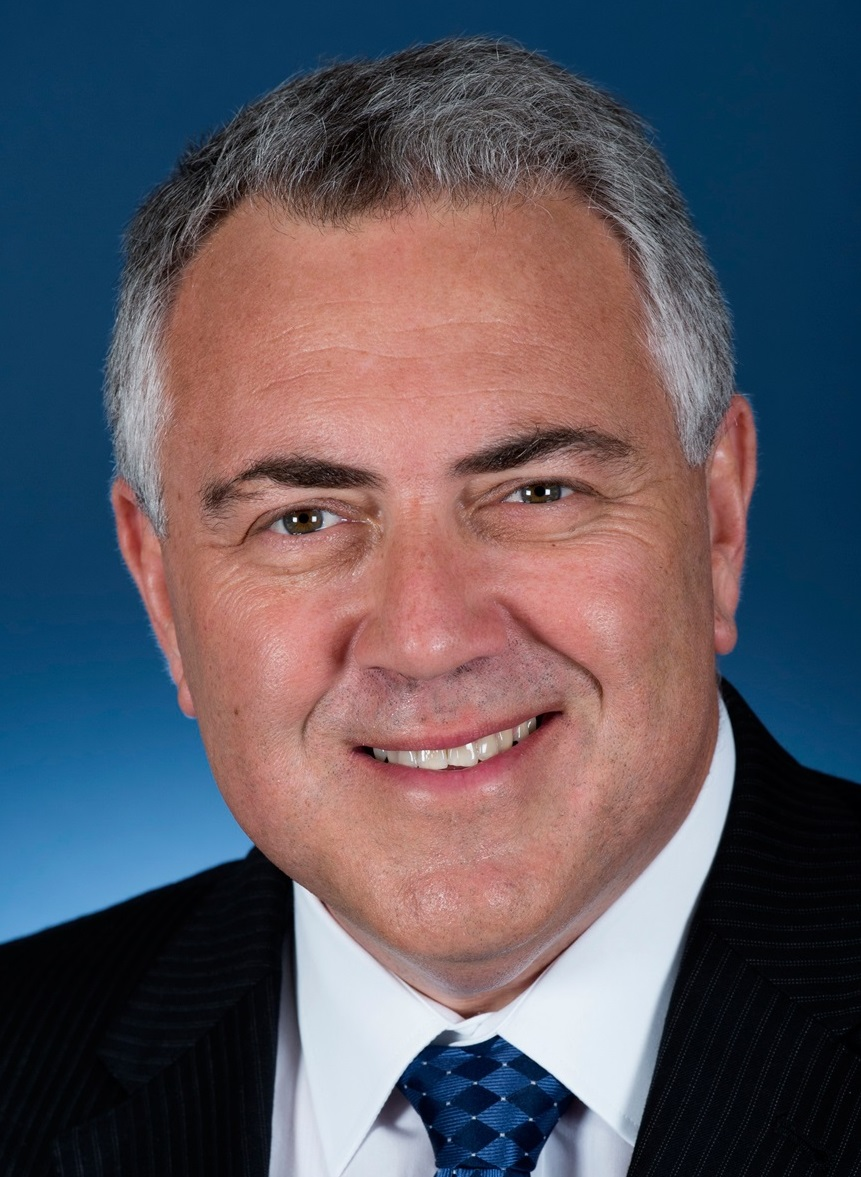
Joe Hockey, treasurer 2013–15

- Tony Abbott AC, former Prime Minister of Australia, former member of the Australian House of Representatives who represented Warringah for the Liberal Party, and former minister in the Howard government (left after graduation from the junior school to attend Saint Ignatius' College, Riverview)
- Maurice Byers CBE QC, solicitor-general of Australia during the Australian constitutional crisis of 1975
- Joseph Farrar Coates, member of the New South Wales Legislative Council and minister in the Lang and Stevens governments (1921–1943)
- Francis Joseph Finnan CBE MP, member of the New South Wales Legislative Assembly representing Hawkesbury and Darlinghurst for Labor; later a public servant
- Nick Greiner AC, former chairman of Infrastructure NSW; 37th Premier of New South Wales (1988–1992); member of the Legislative Assembly representing Ku-ring-gai for the Liberal Party (1980–1992) (also attended Saint Ignatius' College, Riverview)
- Joe Hockey AO, current Australian ambassador to the United States; former member of the Australian House of Representatives, representing North Sydney for the Liberal Party; former minister in the Howard Government; served as treasurer of Australia in the Abbott Government
- Francis Keane, public servant and magistrate
- John Ormond Kennedy, member of Victorian Legislative Assembly representing Hawthorn for the Labor Party 2018–2022
- Michael L'Estrange AO, former Secretary of the Department of Foreign Affairs and Trade; former Australian High Commissioner to the United Kingdom; former Secretary to Cabinet; Rhodes Scholar
- Malcolm Mackerras AO, psephologist and creator of the 'Mackerras Electoral Pendulum'; brother of Charles (also attended Sydney Grammar School)
- Dick Meagher MP, former speaker, and former member of the New South Wales Legislative Assembly representing Sydney-Phillip, then Tweed and then Phillip, variously for Labor and as an independent representative between 1895 and 1917; former Lord Mayor of Sydney (1895–1920) (also attended St Stanislaus' College)
- Jonathan O'Dea MP, member of the New South Wales Legislative Assembly representing Davidson for the Liberal Party 2007–2023 (also attended Saint Ignatius' College, Riverview)
- Tim Stephens, professor of International Law, University of Sydney Law School

== Sport ==
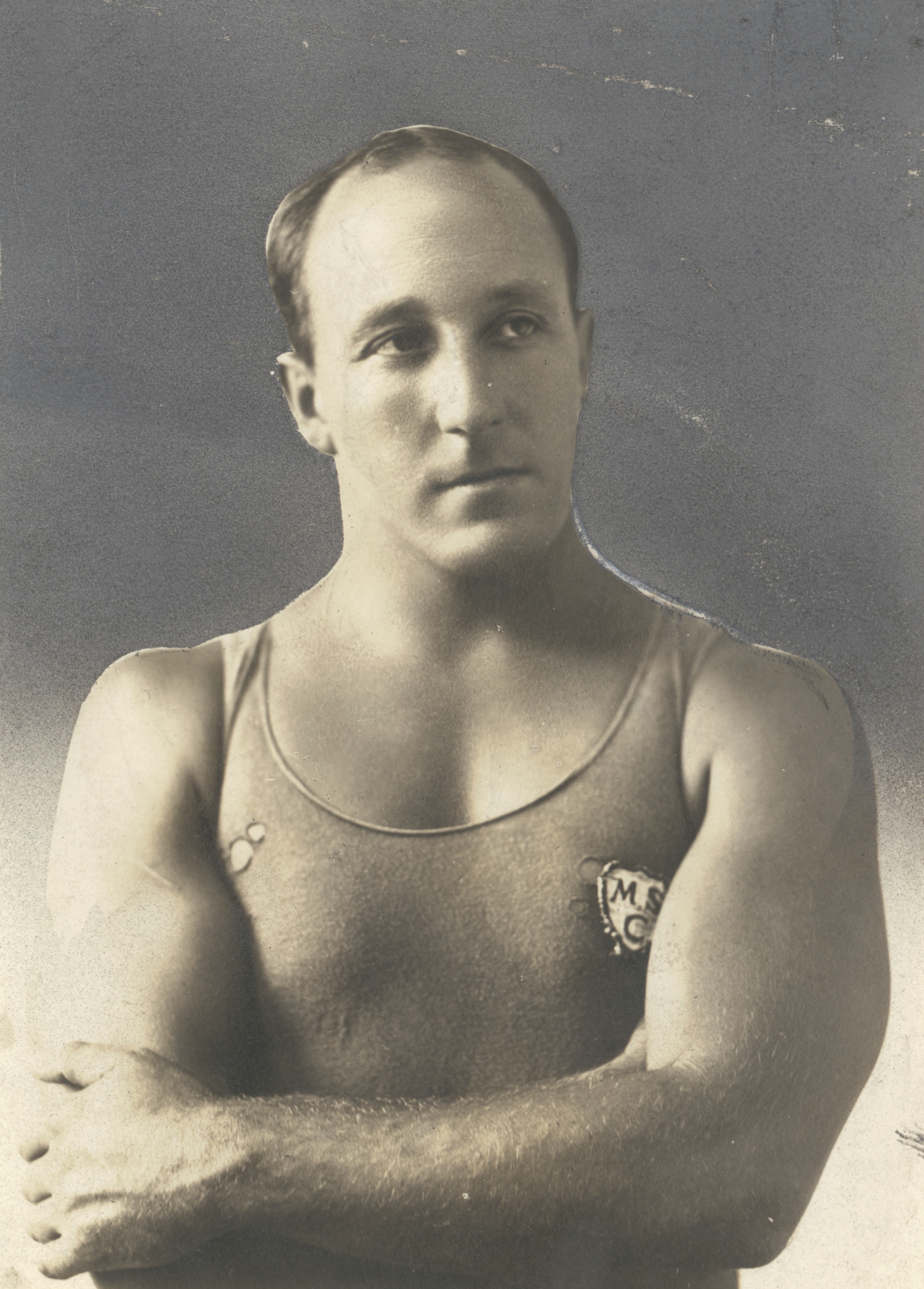
Cecil Healy, Olympic swimming champion

- Les Austin, Wallabies rugby player
- Danny Carroll, Wallabies rugby player
- J.J. Ferris, Australian Test cricketer
- Bernard Foley, Waratahs and Wallabies rugby player
- Keith Gleeson, rugby player, Ireland, Leinster, Waratahs, Australian Barbarians, Australia Under-19s, Australia Under-21s
- Cecil Healy, winner of individual silver and team gold medals in swimming at the 1912 Olympic Games
- James Hughes, Wallabies rugby player
- Tom Kingston, Waratahs and Rebels rugby player
- Ater Majok, basketball player, selected by the Los Angeles Lakers in the 2011 NBA Draft
- Edward Mandible, Wallabies rugby player
- Pat McCabe, Brumbies and Wallabies rugby player
- Herbert Moran,Wallabies captain (1908) (also attended St. Joseph's College, Hunters Hill)
- Jack O'Connor, Australian Test cricketer
- Austin Punch, First Class cricketer, NSW and Tasmania
- Gordon Rorke, Australian Test cricketer

== See also ==
- List of non-government schools in New South Wales
- Combined Associated Schools
