= Hell Island =

Novel by Matthew Reilly

- 2005 paperback cover
- Author: Matthew Reilly
- Illustrator: Tyler Jacobson (2010 Edition)
- Cover artist: Wayne Haag (2005 edition); Tyler Jacobson (2010 edition)
- Language: English
- Series: Shane Schofield
- Genre: Techno-thriller novel
- Publisher: Pan Macmillan
- Publication date: 2005
- Publication place: Australia
- Media type: Print (Paperback)
- Pages: 108
- ISBN: 978-0-330-42343-4
- OCLC: 225186418

Hell Island is a horror/adventure novella, written in conjunction with the Australian Books Alive promotion, by thriller writer Matthew Reilly.

While it is the fourth book released in the Shane Schofield series, it is a standalone novella in the Shane Schofield universe, supplementing the storylines in the novels Ice Station, Area 7, Scarecrow, and Scarecrow and the Army of Thieves. In the interview at the back of Scarecrow and the Army of Thieves, Matthew Reilly stated that "Hell Island exists as a nice side adventure for Scarecrow and Mother, and a great short book for new readers who might wish to try my work." Hell Island was released in retail stores in 2007 after only being available through the Books Alive program.

== Plot summary ==
Hell Island is a remote Pacific Island that no one knows about. It does not feature on any map. It was used by the Japanese during World War II as a remote airfield, but it was soon taken over by American forces in 1943. During the time the book is set, the location is used by the U.S. government for scientific experiments on apes. The U.S. government is using the island for Project Stormtrooper, wherein apes are being engineered in such a way that they become super-soldiers.

The book opens with Schofield's ten-man Marine Recon team parachuting onto the deck of the soon-to-be-decommissioned aircraft carrier, the USS George Washington, along with three other special forces teams – a Delta Force team, a squad of SEALs and a team from the 82nd Airborne Division. The Delta team make landfall on the island while the other three teams investigate the aircraft carrier.

Shane Schofield realises that the carrier is being used for the specific project after the Airborne and SEAL teams are quickly slaughtered. A DARPA scientist, whom Schofield's team stumble across, explain that the enemy is a group of genetically and electronically enhanced gorillas, armed with modified M-4 Colt Commandos and extremely deadly in melee combat.

The few remaining Marines kill significant numbers of the gorillas in a large battle on board the aircraft carrier, eventually departing to investigate the island. Schofield comments that the island is home to an extensive tunnel network dating from World War II, which features an uncommon self-destruct mechanism: sea doors which can flood the lower parts of the tunnel system in the event of an enemy force capturing the base. Schofield then realizes that the gorillas are somehow controlled by Captain William Buck "Buccaneer" Broyles, the former leader of what was acknowledged to be the best Marines Unit, due to the similar tactics his Marines and the gorillas employed.

He realises that the apes can listen to radio chatter and so he sends out a fake distress message which lures the apes to them.

They set a trap to lock the apes in an old ammunition storage bunker before detonating the munitions, but the Delta team's entrance with the rest of the DARPA team (who deactivate the gorillas' neural chips) changes the situation.

A silver disc, attached to the ID of the DARPA scientists and the DELTA team, is responsible for the gorillas not hurting them.

Dr. Knox, the scientist in charge of the project, tells Schofield that they are the sole survivors of a field test for the apes, which has so far killed six hundred Marines and two special forces squads. He congratulates Schofield on his success, before subtly instructing the Delta team leader to execute them. However, Mother jams the radio signals controlling the apes, causing them to turn on the scientists. The Delta team is distracted and subsequently killed by Schofield's team, leaving only Broyles. Schofield opens the sea door of the tunnel system, flooding the tunnels and drowning the gorillas along with the "Buccaneer". The story ends with Schofield's team leaving on a C-17 which was originally sent to pick up the DARPA and Delta teams along with the apes.

== Notes ==
- At the time of publication, Astro was the only character to appear in both the Scarecrow and Huntsman series, suggesting that they are both set in the same 'universe'. This was confirmed in The Four Legendary Kingdoms when Schofield and West meet for the first time.
- Reilly himself recommends the US version of this book due to being less edited than other releases and also illustrated, with the illustrations reflecting how he had envisaged Hell Island while writing it.
- The first chapter of the novella was published in the Herald Sun.
