= The Tournament (Reilly novel) =

2013 book by Matthew Reilly

- First edition
- Author: Matthew Reilly
- Cover artist: Sandy Gull
- Language: English
- Genre: Thriller
- Publisher: Pan Macmillan
- Publication date: 2013
- Publication place: Australian
- Media type: Print (Hardcover, Paperback), Audiobook
- Pages: 432

The Tournament is a 2013 book by Australian author Matthew Reilly.

== Summary ==
Set in 1546 in the Ottoman Empire with Queen Elizabeth as the main character with her mentor Roger Ascham who travel to the Ottoman Empire accepting the challenge of a chess tournament with Gilbert Giles representing England. There is also a murderer on the loose and the case is given to Roger Ascham.
