= The Great Zoo of China =

Book by Matthew Reilly

- The first edition cover
- Author: Matthew Reilly
- Cover artist: IRONGAV
- Language: English
- Genre: Thriller, Science fiction
- Set in: Guangdong Province, China
- Publisher: Macmillan Publishers
- Publication date: (Australia) 10 November 2014 (United States) 27 January 2015
- Publication place: Australian
- Media type: Hardback, eBook, Audiobook.
- Pages: 515
- ISBN: 1476749558

The Great Zoo of China is a 2014 novel by Australian author Matthew Reilly. It was published in November 2014.

== Plot ==
Dr. Cassandra Jane "CJ" Cameron is an alligator expert working as a freelance journalist when she is contacted by National Geographic for an assignment. She is selected to attend a preview of a secret project deep in rural China known as the "Great Zoo of China", and she enlists her brother Hamish as a photographer. After being escorted to the Zoo in a private jet with blacked-out windows, CJ discovers the secretive nature of the Zoo: it houses living, breathing dragons, and the project is intended to be China's answer to Disneyland. It soon becomes apparent that the captive dragons are far more intelligent than the Chinese authorities believed, and the dragons have found a way to break free of their control. CJ and Hamish must find a way to stop the dragons from escaping into the wider world, all the while pursued by the park's military-grade security team, who believe that they can get the dragons under control and that all witnesses to the park's failure must be eliminated.

== Success ==
It was second on the bestsellers list for the week ending November 22, 2014, in Australia, and was a top-three contender at Christmas.

== Ideas ==
Reilly claims he came up with the idea from a dragon museum in Switzerland, and he says that a zoo full of dragons first occurred to him in 2003. He says he was aiming to make the book a "gleeful monster movie on paper", and described it as "out there".
