= Shane Schofield =

Shane Michael "Scarecrow" Schofield
- Created by: Matthew Reilly

In-universe information
- Relatives: John Schofield (Father, deceased), Michael Schofield (grandfather), Elizabeth 'Fox' Gant (girlfriend, deceased)
- Nationality: American

Captain Shane Michael Schofield, callsign Scarecrow, United States Marine Corps, is a fictional character, whose exploits form the basis of a series created by the Australian author Matthew Reilly. He appears in Ice Station (1998), Area 7 (2001), Scarecrow (2003), The Four Legendary Kingdoms (2016; cameo appearance), and the spin-off Hell Island (2005). While the plot differs from novel to novel, it is mainly based around Schofield's legendary reputation as a strong Marine, revered by the Marines that serve under his command, and is known for his high-risk tactical manoeuvres.

The role was voiced by Australian actor Joshua Mensch in the Ice Station live shows and audio drama at the Adelaide Fringe Festival.

== Biography ==
Schofield's callsign "Scarecrow" refers to the vertical scars running over each of his eyes. They were inflicted upon him in 1995 when he was tortured in Serbia during the Yugoslav Wars after his Harrier aircraft was shot down. A Marine Force Reconnaissance unit was sent in, one of its members being Buck "Book" Riley, who later joins Schofield's team in Ice Station. Schofield withstood hours of torture, never revealing his mission, before the Serbs technically blinded him, believing (correctly) that he was helping Navy SEALs that were killing Serbian soldiers. At Johns Hopkins University Hospital, they fixed his eyesight, yet the scars remained, leaving him to cover them with silver, wrap-around, anti-flash sunglasses for the future. Due to military regulations, Schofield was never allowed to fly a military plane again. He then decided to become a ground soldier and returned to Basic School in Quantico, Virginia. A few months later, Schofield was promoted and was eventually given his own Recon unit. He was given command of the unit approximately two years before the events in Ice Station. In Ice Station he holds the rank of lieutenant, and from Area 7 onward he is a captain.

During the events of Scarecrow and the Army of Thieves, more details of his family life were revealed. His grandfather, Michael Schofield (callsign "Mustang") was one of the most decorated Marines in the Corps. While Schofield is close to his grandfather, his relationship with his father, John Schofield, is considerably worse. John Schofield resented Michael's standing within the Corps, and despite being a successful businessman, he felt he was unable to step out from his father's shadow. This manifested in a pattern of systematic abuse against his wife and son. John Schofield ultimately committed suicide, leaving twelve million dollars to his son; Shane Schofield donated all of it to Walter Reed Medical Center, as he felt the money was tainted.

== Appearances ==
=== Ice Station ===
In Ice Station, Schofield and Marine Reconnaissance Unit 16 were sent to answer a distress signal from the isolated Wilkes American research station in Antarctica, from which they claim to have discovered an alien spaceship buried under the ice before the divers sent to investigate it were killed. Schofield's team finds more than they bargained for when they are attacked by a French paratrooper unit, which disguised itself as a group of scientists from a nearby French station in order to gain the Wilke's station's scientists' trust. After narrowly defeating them, Schofield blames himself for not seeing them as soldiers. After a lucky victory, Schofield sends some of his forces and a scientist down to the cavern to investigate the spacecraft. Following the murder of one of his heavily wounded men, Schofield begins to worry that one of his men is a traitor, remembering a distress transmission he received from a fellow Marine, Andrew Trent, years before when Trent claimed that some of his unit's men had turned against the rest. Admitting these fears to Gena 'Mother' Newman, he realises that a scientist named James Renshaw who had apparently killed another scientist before their arrival might be the culprit, but Schofield is promptly shot in the neck while awaiting Renshaw's status and location in the station, his heart stopping.

However, Schofield's would-be assassin kicked his body into the diving pool, unknowingly kick-starting his heart, with the icy water acting as an inadvertent defibrillator. The unconscious Schofield was retrieved by Renshaw, who helped clear up the wound, noting Schofield had been lucky that he had been wearing a hidden kevlar collar where he had been shot, and asked for help in proving his innocence. After confronting the Marine who had shot him, Scott 'Snake' Kaplan, and preventing him from killing Mother, he learned that the Intelligence Convergence Group (ICG), a secretive and insidious government intelligence organisation dedicated to maintaining America's technological superiority at any cost, was preparing to seize the spacecraft and kill Schofield and his team to prevent them from spreading word about the spacecraft. Simultaneously, they learn that a team from the British Special Air Service was on its way, led by Brigadier Trevor Barnby, a former mentor intent on securing the secret of Wilkes Ice Station for the British; consequently, Schofield orders his heavily depleted team to evacuate. But en route to McMurdo station, Schofield and Renshaw's hovercraft went over the ice cliff and into the ocean below, where Schofield destroyed a French submarine intending to destroy Wilkes.

Finding diving equipment in what had once been another ice station before it had disappeared in an iceberg, Schofield and Renshaw made their way back to Wilkes and confronted the SAS team, killing every single member. After receiving a message from the still-alive Trent, Schofield learned the names of several ICG members, proceeding to escape into the ice cavern to avoid being attacked by the Naval Special Forces unit of the US military unit: Navy SEALs. Having learned the spacecraft was actually a long-lost prototype military aircraft called the Silhouette, and that a nuclear missile is set to destroy the Wilkes station, Schofield and the remaining survivors manage to activate the ship, and Schofield narrowly manages to pilot it out. After engaging in a dogfight with a squadron of F-22 Raptors under the control of the ICG, Schofield lands on a USMC aircraft carrier titled "Wasp", using the Silhouette's last missile to destroy the plane.

After arriving in Pearl Harbor, Schofield is confronted by Sergeant-Major Chuck Kozlowski, one of the heads of ICG, who prepares to kill him, but is saved by Trent's intervention. After exposing the ICG, Schofield sits near the bed of the wounded Elizabeth Gant, refusing to leave her side until she wakes up.

=== Area 7 ===
Area 7 happens following the fallout from the Wilkes Ice Station incident. Schofield, Mother and Gant have been reassigned to Presidential Detail, stationed on Marine One, in order to keep them out of the public's eye since Schofield is still popular from the ICG / Wilkes Station situation. He has gone out on a date with Gant earlier, which ended somewhat awkwardly due to Schofield's fear that Gant wouldn't want him because of his eyes and his decision not to kiss her at the conclusion of their date. While paying a routine visit to a top secret Air Force Base, known as Area 7 in the Utah desert, Schofield begins to suspect something is wrong, and is called upon to act as bodyguard for the President when the staff's Air Force personnel, 7th Squadron, led by Charles 'Caesar' Russell, issues a challenge; if the President's heart stops, fourteen major American cities will be destroyed, due to a device connected to the President's heart. After avoiding being killed in the initial attack, Schofield leads a group through the base to locate the President, destroying an AWACs plane and finding a boy named Kevin contained in the facility. Soon, his team find the President and briefly drive away some of the 7th Squadron soldiers.

After learning the base is a research facility to counteract a fictional Chinese-developed virus, called the Sinovirus, which could kill anyone with a specific set of pigmentation cells and that Kevin is being used to develop a cure, Schofield manages to procure the Football for the President so that the warheads won't be detonated at the end of a recurring 90-minute countdown. However, Kevin has been taken by a team of South African Reccondos and the turncoat/scientist Gunther Botha,. Schofield goes to rescue him, but they are intercepted and attacked by 7th Squadron soldiers and are separated from the President, with Schofield in possession of the Football. Arriving at Lake Powell, Schofield and Book II survive a brawl and hide underwater while the Reccondos and Botha are killed and the 7th Squadron forces seize Kevin. While making their way back to Area 7 to get the Football to the President, Schofield tells Book II about his father's death by Barnaby's hands during Ice Station, earning the young Marine's respect. After finding the President and restarting the Football's countdown, Schofield and the others are captured by the escaped prisoners of the facility, and kill some of the 7th Squadron soldiers they are forced to fight. Although Colonel Harper unleashes a Sinovirus grenade in an attempt to kill everyone else, Schofield uses the vaccine that Botha possessed to vaccinate himself and his team.

Schofield then pursues Caesar and the 7th Squadron's Echo unit to Area 8, where the Echo unit is planning to use an X-38 to take Kevin to a Chinese space station. En route, Mother confronts him on not kissing Gant earlier, admitting he is afraid of Gant's thoughts about his eyes, and Mother reassures him about Gant's feelings. At Area 8, Schofield and the President manage to sneak aboard the 747 plane carrying the X-38 and then get on board that in turn. As they head into space, they retrieve Kevin and force the pilot to return to Area 7, where Caesar reveals he also possesses a transmitter on his heart, preparing to kill himself so that he will in some way succeed. Schofield rescues Gant from the remaining prisoner, Lucifer Leary, who is about to kill her, and kisses her at last. They then go to stop Caesar and stop the self-destruct sequence, however Caesar stops him. After narrowly defeating the leader of the 7th Squadron, Kurt Logan, Schofield is able to kill Caesar once Gant disrupts his transmitter, and the two escape the self-destructing facility. Later, after being awarded medals for saving the President's life, Schofield and Gant go on another date.

=== Scarecrow ===
Taking place eighteen months later, Scarecrow has Schofield now dating Gant, forcing them to work in different units due to military protocol, and preparing to propose when they go on a holiday in Italy. After a mission to a former Soviet base turns out to be a sham, Schofield learns he is one of fifteen names on an international bounty hunt list, with each head valued at $18.6 million. Narrowly escaping ExSol and leader Cedric Wexley, Schofield races to find Gant to prevent anyone from using her to get to him. However, he is too late, and another bounty hunting team, IG-88, captures her. Luckily another bounty hunter, Aloysius Knight otherwise known as 'The Black Knight', helps him to rescue Gant, having been paid by Lillian Mattencourt to keep him alive until the end of the bounty. After rescuing Gant, they follow a lead to the Forteresse de Valois, a castle in France where bounties are being paid off.

While waiting in disguise for Knight to gather information, Jonathon Killian (who is the castle's owner) appears pleasant to Schofield and Gant, but he has actually discovered Schofield's true identity and leaves him to the ExSol forces and another bounty-hunting group, the Skorpions. After a lengthy and highly destructive chase, Schofield is forced to parachute into the ocean, while Knight and Gant are captured and taken back to Forteresse de Valois. Before being taken aboard a French aircraft carrier, Book II informs Schofield that Killian and the Majestic-12, the richest men in the world, are eliminating the people on the list because they are the only ones who can disarm a CincLock-VII security system, which will launch missiles at major locations and start a new Cold War. Afterwards, the French (who have not forgotten about Schofield's defeat of the French Paratroopers and submarine at Wilkes Station) use him to disarm a CincLock-VII device and prepare to kill him, but Mother, Knight and Rufus save him just in time. However, they inform him that Gant has been murdered.

The distraught Schofield attempts suicide, but Mother stops him and convinces him not to kill himself and to stop M-12's plans. After stopping all CincLock-VII systems, Schofield discovers Killian has his own plan, to create anarchy by using another missile to blow up Mecca. Using an X-15 to catch up to the missile, Schofield disarms it, but is forced to crash, after which they are apprehended and taken back to the Forteresse de Valois. Killian orders Cal Noonan, who killed Gant with a guillotine, to do the same to Schofield. Luckily, Mother arrives, and Schofield kills Noonan and Wexley in the ensuing battle. After confronting Killian, Schofield takes Killian with him as he jumps out the window to kill them both, but Knight rescues him with his maghook. After a few weeks, Schofield receives a letter from Knight encouraging him to move on with his life and accept Gant's death, and Schofield decides to return to duty.

=== Hell Island ===
In Hell Island, Schofield is re-equipped with a new team of Force Recon Marines. On a mission to a base which conducts scientific experiments and apparently attacked on Hell Island, Schofield's Marines, as well as a Delta Force team, a squad of SEALs and a force from the 82nd Airborne Division, prepare to investigate. Landing on an aircraft carrier, Schofield team are the only survivors of the groups that landed on the carrier after being attacked by gorillas, enhanced with a chip (nanotechnology) within their brains to turn them into soldiers. Defeating a large number of the gorillas by luring them into a helicopter and ditching it into the ocean, the Marines try to come up with a plan, during which Schofield realises the gorillas are being controlled by William Buck "Buccaneer" Broyles, the former leader of what was acknowledged to be the best Marines Unit.

Using knowledge gained from his grandfather, Michael Schofield, who was one of many Marines who seized the island during World War II, he leads his men into an old munitions chamber where the gorillas are trapped and set to be killed in an explosion. However, Dr Malcolm Knox, the DARPA scientist in charge of the project, stops them and apparently congratulates Schofield on his success for his unknowing participation in the test. But Knox orders the Delta team to execute them. However, Mother jams the signals controlling the chips in the apes, releasing them to murder the scientists while Schofield and his men kill the Delta team. Schofield floods the tunnels and drowns the gorillas along with the "Buccaneer". They leave on a C-17 which was sent to pick up the DARPA scientists and Delta teams along with the apes.

=== Scarecrow and the Army of Thieves ===
Despite being cleared for active duty at the end of Scarecrow, Schofield is considered to be a liability by the Corps, a 'broken' Marine, and becomes a teacher at Parris Island. The position is considered to be an insult to a Marine of Schofield's standing, but he finds he enjoys teaching, and many of his students respect him. However, his situation is complicated by an outstanding bounty on his head. Although the members of the Majestic-12 conspiracy are all dead, the French government has offered to pay the $18.6 million bounty to anyone who can capture or kill him. After surviving several assassination attempts, Schofield is assigned to a long-term equipment testing project with a handful of Marines and civilian contractors. He and his unit are stationed in the Arctic when the Army of Thieves takes control of the Dragon Island weapons facility, which was once the crown jewel in the Soviet weapons development program.

Schofield and his team infiltrate the weapons depot, aiming to disarm a "Tesla weapon", an experimental device that, when fired, will ignite the atmosphere and trigger a firestorm that could annihilate the Northern Hemisphere. Along the way, they encounter Veronique Champion, an assassin working for the French Directorate-General for External Security seeking to kill Schofield as an enemy of France. Unaware of the threat posed by the Army of Thieves, Champion agrees to help him, but promises to kill him once the threat is over.

A recurring subplot throughout the story deals with Schofield's psychological state following the murder of Elizabeth Gant. After seeing a civilian psychiatrist, he accepts that he will never get closure over Gant's death, but by compartmentalising his memories of her, he will be able to continue being a soldier. This ability becomes crucial in enduring torture at the hands of Marius Calderon, the leader of the Army of Thieves.

=== The Four Legendary Kingdoms ===
When Reilly's other recurring protagonist, Jack West Jr, is abducted and forced to participate in the Hydra Games, a contest of sixteen champions forced to fight each other by threatening their loved ones, he meets and befriends Schofield when the two men realise that they were each abducted to fight in this contest. Recognising that the wider meaning of the Games is important even if its current purpose is cruel, the two work together to save their hostages, with Schofield asking the game masters to spare West's life as his 'reward' for winning one round. With their actions in the Games completing half of a ritual to divert a rogue galaxy from the Milky Way, West is apparently forced to kill Schofield in a later stage, but Schofield is revealed to have faked his death using hyper-oxygenated blood, joining forces with West to find three lost cities that will allow them to prevent an upcoming 'Omega Event' (The apparent destruction of the universe).
