= Contest (novel) =

Novel by Matthew Reilly

- Author: Matthew Reilly
- Publication date: 1 June 1996
- ISBN: 9780312286255

Contest is a novel by Australian author Matthew Reilly.

The novel is notable for making the author's career, after being self-published when he was 22 and catching the eye of a publisher who contracted him to write more books. His subsequent writing of bestsellers such as Ice Station established his career, leading Contest to become a NYT best-seller.

The plot of the novel involves a gladiatorial contest between alien species taking place within a New York library, with the human main character being unable to leave unless victorious.

There were plans to adapt the novel to the screen with screenwriter Terence Mulloy set to write the script. As of 2023 the film production hasn't taken place.
