= The Secret Runners of New York =

2019 novel by Matthew Reilly

- Author: Matthew Reilly
- Language: English
- Publication date: 2019

The Secret Runners of New York is a 2019 novel by Australian thriller writer Matthew Reilly. In an interview published in The Australian in 2021, The Secret Runners of New York was described as Reilly's "quieter, more serious" writing. The "secret runners" of the title are students at a fictional Upper East Side school who have access to a time portal located in Central Park
