= Scarecrow and the Army of Thieves =

2011 novel by Matthew Reilly

- Australian first edition cover
- Author: Matthew Reilly
- Cover artist: Wayne Haag
- Language: English
- Series: Shane Schofield
- Genre: Thriller novel, Techno-thriller
- Publisher: Pan MacMillan
- Publication date: 12 October 2011
- Publication place: Australia
- Media type: Print (Hardcover)
- Pages: 576
- ISBN: 978-1-74261-028-3
- Preceded by: Scarecrow

Scarecrow and the Army of Thieves is an action thriller novel released on 12 October 2011 by Australian author Matthew Reilly. It is the latest installment in the Shane Schofield series.

== Marketing ==
On 24 December 2010, Reilly announced his fifth Scarecrow novel, stating:

The first draft is finished, done, dusted. And I can confidently say that this is easily the fastest Scarecrow book yet. It is also considerably more violent than any of my previous books. This sort of crept up on me (and I was the guy writing the book!), but as my readers will know, in my books, death has to be something to be feared. It has to be horrible, grisly, and, well, violent. And the Army of Thieves aren't a very nice bunch of guys, so death at their hands will be very nasty indeed...

One month before the official release, Reilly's publisher released a video trailer for the book.

== Plot summary ==
During a routine re-staffing of Dragon Island, an old Soviet weapons installation in the Arctic, a Russian Spetsnaz team comes under fire from an unknown enemy. Vasily Ivanov, a researcher assigned to Dragon, manages to send out a distress signal which is intercepted by an American listening station in Alaska before his plane is shot down. Dragon Island was once the cornerstone of Soviet weapons research, a place where cutting-edge weapons were designed by scientists with a blank cheque. It has been seized by an organisation calling themselves "The Army of Thieves", led by the enigmatic Lord of Anarchy. Self-proclaimed anarchists, the Army is made up of former enforcers of the Pinochet regime, Sudanese Janjaweed militants, Islamic fundamentalists and narco-terrorists. They are planning to unleash Dragon Island's centrepiece, known as the Tesla Weapon. Experiments with rocket fuel and samples of acids acquired from the atmosphere of Venus have created a compound that, when ignited, can set fire to the atmosphere. The Tesla Weapons were constructed on Dragon Island, as prevailing air currents will disperse the acid-fuel mixture around the world. The Army of Thieves have taken control of the facility on Dragon Island and have activated the preliminary stages of the Tesla Weapon.

Still reeling from the events of Scarecrow, United States Marine Corps Captain Shane Schofield has been reassigned to an equipment-testing project in the Arctic; this equipment includes BRT-E, or "Bertie", a multi-functional, independently intelligent robot. Although cleared for active duty, Schofield is seen as a liability by the Corps and has spent most of his time teaching new recruits. His situation is somewhat complicated by an outstanding bounty on his head; although members of the Majestic-12 conspiracy are dead, the French government has offered to pay the bounty as retaliation for the events of Ice Station and Scarecrow. Schofield is one of just two units close to Dragon Island; the other is a Navy SEAL team stationed on the USS Miami, a Los Angeles–class submarine. Ira Barker, the leader of this unit, warns Schofield to stay away from Dragon Island or else risk being caught in the crossfire. The SEAL insertion is a disaster, with every member of the team being killed off by the evil Army. With no other choice, Schofield makes for Dragon Island.

Schofield and his unit locate the remains of Ivanov's downed plane, and manage to rescue him while the Army attack. However, they are interrupted by the arrival of a French submarine; the French government has sent an assassin known as Renard after Schofield. Realising the threat posed by the Army, Schofield saves Renard and two members of the French commando team sent after him, Dubois and Huguenot, also known as "The Barbarian", or "Baba" and described as Mother's equal. Successfully infiltrating Dragon Island, Renard reveals herself to be Veronique Champion, cousin to Luc Champion, a French researcher killed in Ice Station. She agrees to help Schofield stop the Army, but pledges to kill him once the threat ends. They question Ivanov, who reveals that in order to fire the Tesla weapon, the Army needs to seed the atmosphere with the acid-rocket fuel mixture, before firing a battery of missiles armed with red uranium into the cloud. Schofield decides to target the red uranium and throw it into the Arctic Ocean.

As Schofield and his team begin to fight their way through the installation, David Fairfax – his friend in the Defense Intelligence Agency – begins to research the Army and Dragon Island. He grows suspicious that an irregular army such as the Army of Thieves would be able to carry out a string of attacks against high-value targets to arm themselves, and his suspicions are confirmed when he finds a CIA operative named Marius Calderon was writing about Dragon Island before the Soviet Union actually built anything there. He confirms that the Lord of Anarchy is actually Calderon, the CIA's foremost expert on psychological operations and gifted with extraordinary foresight; Calderon predicted the rise of China as an economic superpower by 2010 as early as 1982. Fairfax realises that Calderon let the Soviet Union discover the plans to the Tesla Weapon, and that the acid-rocket fuel mix will be distributed by the jetstream over China, India and Europe; once ignited, these regions will be decimated, but the United States will be relatively unaffected and able to preserve its position as the world's only economic superpower. Calderon succeeds in firing a missile armed with red uranium into the gas cloud, igniting it, but it is revealed that Ira Barker survived the SEAL team's assault and was able to shut down the gas diffusion process long enough to create a safe buffer, thereby limiting the ignition. However, Calderon still has several missiles at his disposal, and the larger gas cloud is well within their range.

Schofield destroys the red uranium primers one by one, but most of team is captured before he can destroy the last two. He and his team are tortured by Calderon – Mother and Baba have their heads locked in wooden boxes with hungry rats – before Schofield is electrocuted and his signature sunglasses claimed as a prize by Calderon. He is revived by Bertie and finds Mother and Baba survived by biting the heads off the rats locked in with them. They then give chase to Calderon before he can either launch the final missile, or detonate a warhead on board a cargo plane. Calderon escapes by ejecting a stolen mini-submersible from his plane, but Schofield ejects the last missile from the plane before it can ignite the gas cloud. The subsequent explosion disables Calderon's submarine; he is found two weeks later by a Norwegian fishing trawler, having suffocated at the bottom of the ocean.

With the threat posed by the Army finally over, the Russian government authorises a missile strike on Dragon Island. Schofield races back to the facility and gathers his unit in a nuclear bunker hidden under a laboratory. The missile destroys Dragon Island and kills the remnants of the Army. Schofield and his team are found alive and well several days later, having survived the blast. They are commended by the President for their actions, and the French government lift the bounty on Schofield's head for rescuing Veronique's team. Having finally come to terms with the death of Elizabeth Gant, Schofield starts a relationship with Veronique Champion – however, upon returning to the Marine barracks, he finds his sunglasses in his room, implying that Marius Calderon is alive.

== Main characters ==
Shane "Scarecrow" Schofield

A brilliant Marine Captain who is considered broken from the bounty hunt in the book Scarecrow after his girlfriend, Elizabeth "Fox" Gant, was killed. He is still recovering and has a USA $2,000,000 bounty on him from the French Government. He is working up in the North Pole with a DARPA team testing out new inventions along with his trusted friend Mother and two other Marines. He is constantly tormented by Marius Calderon over the death of Gant and a side story is him trying to cope with the loss.

Gena "Mother" Newman

A friend of Schofield's who knows him better than most people as she has been with him since before the events in Ice Station. She tries to help Schofield get through Gant's death, which is also causing a strain in her marriage. Mother meets her perfect match and the two grow close.

David Fairfax

A geeky cryptanalyst working with the DIA who helps Schofield by obtaining information to help with the mission. Schofield and Fairfax are good friends who Schofield stays in contact with for most of the book. Fairfax saves a woman from being kidnapped by several members of the Army of Thieves and they work on trying to find out why the Army of Thieves is on Dragon Island.

Veronique "Renard" Champion

Champion, the cousin of Luc Champion who was killed during the events in Ice Station, is a French woman Schofield meets during a failed assassination attempt, is trying to avenge her cousin's, which she blames on Schofield. During the novel's events, Schofield and Champion grow close and by the end, it is possible they have started a relationship together. It is revealed that Renard is French for fox (Libby Gant, Schofield's girlfriend killed in Scarecrow, has the callsign "Fox").

Jean-Claude Francois Michel "Le Barbarian/Baba" Huguenot

Mother's perfect match who is part of the French assassination attempt on Schofield due to the bounty on him. Mother and Baba share many similarities and they work closely together during the mission. Mother is offered the chance to be with Baba but in the end, she decides to stay with her husband.

Marius Calderon

A CIA agent who theorised that China will become more powerful than the U.S. almost three decades before it did. He is the leader of the Army of Thieves who uses Psychological warfare against Schofield, going as far as to taunt Schofield over the loss of Gant. Calderon even makes Schofield watch as he presumably kills Mother and Baba for no reason than for him to just see it happen. Schofield was informed that Calderon died, which is later found to be false when he leaves Schofield's anti-flash glasses that he took earlier and left them on his bed.
