= Temple (novel) =

Novel by Matthew Reilly

- Cover of Temple
- Author: Matthew Reilly
- Language: English
- Genre: Techno-thriller novel
- Publisher: Pan Macmillan
- Publication date: August 1999
- Publication place: Australia
- Media type: Print (Paperback & Hardback)
- Pages: 689 pp
- ISBN: 0-330-48248-3
- OCLC: 223355001

Temple is a thriller novel written by Australian author Matthew Reilly and first published in 1999. Like Reilly's other books, Temple's major attractions are the fast pace and the complexity of the action scenes.

At the time of publication, Reilly hinted at the possibility of a sequel starring the same protagonist, Professor William Race, but the release of such a book has never been officially confirmed.

== Introduction ==
Temple is split into two stories, both set in South America: One set during the Spanish Occupation of South America and one set in 1999 at the same place.

The main focus of the former story is the journey of a monk named Alberto Santiago who becomes a traitor to his country after witnessing Spanish atrocities among the Incan civilisation. Aiding an Incan Prince named Renco Capac to escape, Santiago begins a quest to protect a special Idol - 'The Spirit of the People', an idol carved from black stone with purple veins running through it, actually carved from a meteorite that fell on earth, from the invading Spaniards. Upon his return to Spain, Santiago records his story in a transcript in San Sebastian Monastery in France.

Four hundred years later, a group of German armed militia known as the Stormtroopers raid the monastery, executing all but one of the Jesuit monks living there, recovering the Santiago manuscript. Meanwhile, another party raids DARPA (The Defence Advanced Research Projects Agency) headquarters in order to capture a new superweapon known as the Supernova. DARPA sends Colonel Frank Nash to Peru with the aid of NYU linguistics professor William Race to recover the idol before anyone else can retrieve it. Their mission: to retrieve 'the Spirit of the People' (as the natives call it), carved out of Thyrium-261, a nuclear material from a binary star system that came to Earth via a meteorite. Thyrium has the potential to provide virtually limitless clean energy, which can fuel the Supernova, a next-generation weapon of mass destruction with the power to decimate a third of the Earth's surface and bring about Doomsday.

== Plot summary ==
=== William Race's adventure ===
Professor William Race is a young linguist, working for NYU is approached by a retired Col. Frank Nash, a physicist from the Defence Advanced Research Projects Agency, or DARPA, to translate a manuscript written in ancient Latin, to find an ancient Incan idol in the South American jungles. Race is told that his brother, Martin Race, was the one who suggested his name, and that his ex college sweetheart, Lauren O'Connor is also accompanying them. Race reluctantly agrees.

En route to Peru, Nash provides Race with photocopied pages of a copy of the Santiago Manuscript, which describes the adventures of Alberto Santiago, a Spanish missionary in ancient Peru, whilst also holding the key to the final resting place of a legendary Incan idol, allegedly made of thyrium-261, an element that, when combined with the mass destruction weapon called Supernova, would destroy a third of the Earth's mass throwing it off from its orbit and effectively killing the planet. The team travels to Cuzco, Peru with physicists Troy Copeland and Lauren O'Connor, archaeologist Gaby Lopez, anthropologist Walter Chambers and a team of six Green Berets, including Race's personal bodyguard Leo Van Lewen.

Race, translating the copy of the manuscript that Frank Nash's team had acquired prior to the flight to Peru, discovers that Santiago and his expedition ended up in Vilcafor, an Incan town deep in the Amazon. However, this was only a partially completed copy, so they didn't know what occurred after Santiago's arrival in Vilcafor. The team decide to use the information in the manuscript to make their way to Vilcafor and find out if the idol resides there.

After arriving in Cuzco, Race's team makes use of Huey helicopters to travel into the Amazon and find Vilcafor, making use of the totem pole clues detailed in the manuscript. After some time in flight, the team finds Vilcafor and lands in the town center. Using a Nucleotide Resonance Imager (NRI), the team discovered a source of Thyrium-261 to the west of Vilcafor, and headed for the source.

This led them to a finger of rock in the middle of a canyon, on which sat an ancient temple, which Lopez and Chambers deduced to be pre-Incan. Nash decided to blow open the temple's entrance with C-2 plastic explosive. However, as this was happening, the two Green Berets left to guard Vilcafor, Corporal 'Doogie' Kennedy and Corporal 'Tex' Reichart, were ambushed by a German assault team. The Germans took the town then with use of 'Apache' attack helicopters took the temple from Nash's team, taking them prisoner and putting them in the town.

The Germans decided to open the temple themselves. However, this unleashed the inhabitants of the temple known as rapas. Rapas, big cats likened to jaguars and previously considered no more than myth, emerged from the temple to first decimate the German temple team then descended on Vilcafor to tear apart the rest of the Germans. Nash's team, separated, had to take drastic option to avoid their own deaths, but were able to survive with only the loss of Walt Chambers to the caimans, crocodilians lurking in the river next to Vilcafor. They were also able to pick up five members of the German team; two soldiers (Lt. Marc Graf and Corporal Molke), two members of the German's equivalent of the FBI, the BKA (Bundes Kriminal Amt), which included Renee Becker and Karl Schroeder, and finally zoologist/cryptozoologist Johann Krauss.

Going on the assumption that the rapas would be averse to daylight, the team sent Green Berets Cpt. Scott and 'Chuck' Wilson as well as one of the German soldiers (Lt. Graf) to the temple to make a second attempt at getting the idol. This failed in a massive bloodbath, with all three soldiers being killed by the rapas after a rapa ambush. They had wrongly assumed, with the rapas using the shade to attack.

Discovering that the Stormtroopers were on their way to Vilcafor, but with no knowing of when they would arrive, Nash's team set to work. The German team had a completed copy of the manuscript, so Race started translating it. Making use of information from the German manuscript, the team decided to make a third attempt on the temple at night, this time sending Corporals 'Buzz' Cochrane and 'Tex' Reichart as well as Sgt. Van Lewen. They made use of monkey faeces acquired by Cochrane to put off the rapas and avoid attack.

However, as this occurred, the Stormtroopers finally made their appearance in Vilcafor, coming out of the rainforest. Using futuristic G-11 assault rifles, they ripped apart the rapas, taking the town. Their communications jammed, Nash sent Race ahead to warn their temple team. He caught up to the temple team as they emerged from the temple with the idol, also discovering a skeleton he presumed to be Renco Capac, the Incan prince in the manuscript. However, the Stormtroopers had also caught up with their own attack helicopter, killing Tex Reichart and wounding Buzz Cochrane. Reichart, having been in possession of the idol when he died, dropped the idol, sending it sliding down the hill. Race attempted to recover it, but almost fell off the top of the rock, using the grappling hook on his M-16 assault rifle to avoid being shot by the Stormtroopers. The Stormtroopers recover the idol and escape, while Race and Van Lewen, the last remaining mobile people on the rock, escaping as well, leaving Cochrane on top of the rock.

Race, Van Lewen, Doogie, Schroeder, Renee and Molke, using an Incan royal escape route under Vilcafor's citadel, give chase to the neo-Nazi Stormtroopers, including Heinrich Anistaze, second in command to Odilo Ehrhardt. Using German jet skis, the team pursue the Nazis, losing Molke in the initial phase of the battle. The team disperses across the Nazi river armada, using divide and conquer techniques to make their force seem larger and disorienting the Nazis. Renee and Race are captured by Ehrhardt and Van Lewen and Doogie Kennedy manage to escape with the use of a Nazi seaplane. Karl Schroeder sacrifices himself using a chlorine isotopic charge that wipes out the rest of the Nazis.

Ehrhardt's helicopter lands in the Nazi's base of operations, a Peruvian gold mine, with Anistaze, Renee and Race aboard as well as Ehrhardt. Ehrhardt announces his plan to use the idol with his own Supernova to ransom the fate of the world to the U.S. Government in order to crash the American economy and build himself a new world. He then sent Race and Renee to be executed by two of his Nazi soldiers. However, they were saved by Uli Peck, a BKA undercover agent who had infiltrated the Nazis and allowed Renee's German team to acquire their manuscript. Race stole the other Nazi's kevlar breastplate from his body, then Renee, Uli and Race set off to stop Ehrhardt. They were confronted by Anistaze and Ehrhardt, with Race decapitating Anistaze and Uli being wounded.

Race managed to stop Ehrhardt and disarm the Nazi Supernova with only two seconds to spare before detonation, after the U.S. Government failed to come up with the ransom money. He had deduced that the weapon's creator, Dr. Fritz Weber, a Nazi scientist who had been killed by Ehrhardt, had used his supposed execution date as the disarm code. However, the secondary explosion of hydrazine drums almost killed Race, but he managed to climb into the Supernova's chamber, and was launched out of the area by the explosion, being recovered by Doogie's seaplane along with Renee and Uli.

At this point, Race makes a litany of discoveries. He learns that Frank Nash is actually not retired, and is an active U.S. Army colonel, and that Nash's team is the Army's bid to justify their existence to the U.S. Congress and avoid liquidation, attempting to undercut the U.S. Navy and Air Force's own bids to acquire the idol. Race also discovers that the idol is a fake, as it didn't resonate when doused in water when the sprinkler system inside the room that the Nazi Supernova was housed had been triggered. His suspicions are confirmed through his final reading of the manuscript, this time using the original manuscript that the Nazis had stolen from the monastery.

Race returns to Vilcafor to join the others, and proves that the idol is indeed in an Incan village past the rock, which is where the NRI scan had actually pointed, not at the temple like the team had first assumed. The real idol is found at an altar, and the Incans there revere and worship Race, as he is found to have a birthmark below his left eye that is similar to Renco Capac's birthmark, reputed to be the Mark of the Sun. Race is made to fight a caiman in order to prove he really is the Chosen One. Race with much difficulty manages to kill the caiman and is celebrated by the Incans. At this moment, the Navy expedition attacks, attempting a snatch-and-grab operation on the idol. Nash's backup team also arrives, attacking and killing the Navy team's Super Stallion helicopters with their own Comanche helicopters. Nash's team arrived in Vilcafor, where they captured the Navy's civilian team, which included Race's brother Marty. Nash began executing the Navy civilians, Van Lewen, Renee and Race helpless as they were held at gunpoint by Troy Copeland. Marty is revealed as Nash's co-conspirator, the man who had provided Nash with his copy of the manuscript. Race attempts to reveal that Lauren, Marty's wife, had been cheating on him with Copeland, but Race is silenced by Marty. Van Lewen is killed by Nash after Van Lewen stepped in front of Nash's gun. Nash attempts to kill Race, but is interrupted by the Incan natives who shoot Nash in the arm with an arrow and ambush the town. Race is again saved after the escaping Nash's gunner is killed by Doogie while attempting to kill Race and Renee with the Army helicopter's cannon.

Nash's team is then set back down by another attacking team, this time a rogue militia known as the Republican Army of Texas. They had recently merged with the Oklahoma Freedom Fighters, a technological militia, and a Japanese doomsday terrorist group. This was the team that had stolen the DARPA Supernova from their headquarters, with the sole purpose of destroying the world. This team was led by Earl Bittiker, a brutal former Navy SEAL. It is revealed by Copeland that he has been in league with Bittiker, betraying Lauren, who had betrayed Marty. Lauren is shot to death by Copeland, while Nash is wounded by Bittiker. Marty is also mortally wounded, but with his final breath clues to Race that Marty was the ignition creator of the DARPA Supernova. The Texans depart with the idol in their possession.

Race, Renee, Doogie and Gaby Lopez give chase in Doogie's seaplane in order to foil the Texan's plan. The Texans board an Antonov An-22 cargo plane and using their Supernova that they have stored in an M1A1 Abrams Main Battle Tank, activate the Supernova. Race commences his one-man assault on the plane, boarding it from the rear loading ramp in mid-air. He manages to get inside the Abrams tank with the Supernova. However, he is accosted by Bittiker. Race starts up the tank's engine, which unbalances Bittiker, then fires the main gun of the tank, managing to decapitate Copeland and kill the Antonov's pilot, sending the plane nosediving. Race then reversed the tank out of the plane and into the sky.

With the tank free-falling and Bittiker attempting to get inside, having managed to hold on, Race starts trying to disarm the Supernova. Using the information of Marty being the designer of the Supernova's ignition system, he deduces that Marty, as a massive Elvis Presley fan, used Elvis' army serial code for the disarm code of the Supernova. Race manages to disarm the Supernova with 4 seconds to spare, saving the world from destruction. He escapes the falling tank, with Bittiker now trapped inside, and is saved by the breastplate that he had stolen from the dead Nazi in the mine, which turns out to be an experimental DARPA jet pack which had been stolen by the Nazis along with fifteen other jet packs two years previously. Bittiker has no such luck and is killed by the monumental impact of the ground, still inside the tank.

Now Race, Renee, Doogie, Gaby and Uli fly back to the village. Race lures the rapas back into the temple using the idol, wet in order to hypnotise the rapas with the resonance of the idol. Race places the fake idol near the entrance to fool any potential future temple raiders, and notices the bodies left by the Incan natives as sacrifice to the rapas among them including the Navy and Army teams, and sees the treasure of Solon so long sought by explorers over history, but is not tempted and leaves it behind. He manages finds an alternative route out, trapping the rapas back in the temple. Race returns the real idol back to the Indians, advising them to leave the village for elsewhere as more people may come in search for the idol, and departs with the others for home.

=== Alberto Santiago's Story ===
Santiago's story takes place five hundred years prior to the main events of the story, in South America. It is told in the form of a story within a story, the memoirs of a Spanish priest during the discovery of South America. Santiago's manuscript appears several times in the story, with Professor Race reading and translating it, providing his comrades with crucial information to reach the idol.

Disgusted by the atrocities of his countrymen on the Incans, Spanish priest Alberto Santiago betrays them when he frees Renco Capac, an Incan prince, from a spanish prison hulk. Much of Santiago's story details his journey with Renco and a criminal named Bassario from Cuzco to the citadel at Vilcafor as they attempt to defend a sacred Incan idol from pursuing conquistadors, led by the wicked Spanish leader Hernando. The Spaniards wish to conquer the Incas and also grab a hidden treasure, as well as kill Alberto for his treachery. The trio travel day in and night out and finally make it to Vilcafor with the idol, where they hope to hide it before Hernando can find them.

At Vilcafor, Alberto is introduced to Renco's widowed sister and her young son, and the other Incans hiding in the citadel. He learns of the Vicious Rapas that come out of the temple at night, and that when made wet, the idol hums a tune which puts the Rapas in a trance. Renco has Bassario make an exact replica of the idol which is fake. Alberto also learns of a treasure hidden in a temple built by one Solon years before, and guarded by Rapas, which the Spaniards are after. The Incans and Alberto reach the temple with the idol keeping the Rapas in trance, and manage to lure them all into the temple, but are attacked by Hernando and the conquistadors before they can completely close the door. Hernando gets the "fake" idol from Renco, but before he can kill them, the conquistadors are attacked by Bassario and the Incans and the returning Rapas. In the fight, Alberto is saved by his bible as it absorbs Hernando's shot. Hernando is killed by Santiago on the rope bridge and the Spaniards are killed by the Incans. Renco then lures the Rapas back into the temple and asks that the stone door be shut behind them, thereby trapping the Rapas inside with him and the idols.

=== Epilogue ===
As Professor William Race and the others head home, Race calls and appraises the investigation officers back home about the events. He then proceeds to read the last part of Alberto Santiago's manuscript, which he gets from the village.

Alberto Santiago is now an old man, reminiscing his memories and penning them in a monastery in the mountains of Europe. Renco trapped the Rapas and the fake idol and escaped from the temple with the real one (the same way Race did) and reunited with his comrades. Bassario now has joined the Incas, Alberto married Lena and has two daughters with her. Renco and Alberto are long lived friends, until Lena and Renco pass away in old age. Alberto ends his writings with a short poem sung by the Incans, praising their hero Renco. Race notes that he has the same mark beneath his left eye as described in Renco, but at the very end has the epiphany that only Race had fallen from the sky to save the idol, while Renco hadn't. This implies that Race is in fact the one and only Chosen One as foretold by the Incans.

== Characters ==
=== Civilians (American) ===
William Race The main protagonist. He is an ancient languages professor at New York University. He is unwillingly dragged into a US army special operation by Francis Nash. He is highly inspired by the story of Alberto Santiago's adventure with Renco Capac and several similarities are shown between him and Renco. He later kisses his love interest, Renee Becker, near the end of the story.

Troy Copeland A nuclear physicist, who is part of Nash's scam to steal the idol for hostile purposes. He was having an affair with Lauren, and using the information she got from her husband he aided Bittiker in detonating the Supernova. Race later kills him with a tank shell to the head

Lauren O'Conner Married to the brother of her college sweetheart, William Race, she too is in on Nash's scam. She was having an affair with Copeland, and giving him secrets that her husband Marty knew, which aided Copeland in setting up the Supernova with the idol for the Texans, which Lauren didn't know. Copeland later shoots her.

Walter Chambers The anthropologist of the crew. Shown as bookish but capable, and spots the threat of the rapas early. Chambers is brutally killed by vicious caimans, massive crocodilians.

Gaby Lopez The archaeologist of the team, she survives the horrors of Peru. She was seconds from death when Doogie saved her from a caiman. She later asks Doogie out for dinner.

Martin Race Brother of William Race, whom William hasn't seen in years. It is revealed towards the end that he is married to Lauren, but he in fact was being manipulated by Lauren to suit her needs.

=== American Armed Forces Members ===
Colonel Francis Nash Claims to be part of DARPA, but is revealed to be an Army man. He betrays his own squad and shoots Van Lewen and the Navy comrades. He brought along Chambers, Lopez and Race to aid him, and Copeland and Lauren to steal the idol from its rightful owner, the Incan people. He is later mutilated by the Indians and sacrificed to the rapas for his crimes.

Captain Dwayne Scott, the leader of the Green Berets. He dies a painful death when the second venture into the Incan temple results in a rapa attack.

Sergeant Leonardo Van Lewen, Race's assigned bodyguard. A considerate and resourceful man, as well as a leader by example, he helps Race in his quest to stop the Nazis and then stop Nash. He makes the ultimate sacrifice for Race, stepping in front of him when Nash brandishes a gun. Nash shoots Van Lewen anyway.

Corporal Jacob "Buzz" Cochrane is part of the team that goes into the temple for the third time. A crude and egotistical soldier, he is disliked by Race for this and later is wounded by the Nazis. Left on the rock, he is discovered by the Incans later and sacrificed to the rapas.

Corporal George "Tex" Reichart is shot fatally in the same attack that wounded Cochrane during the retrieval of the idol. One of the only members of the Green Berets apart from Van Lewen that appreciated Doogie Kennedy.

Corporal Charles "Chuck" Wilson, like Captain Scott, is mauled by rapas in the first venture into the temple. Is seemingly as crude as Cochrane, as he participates in the tasteless "80s Club", a club whose members have had sex with women born in the 1980s (the events of Temple take place in early 1999, so that means any woman in their teens, making for a very crude concept).

Corporal Douglas "Doogie" Kennedy is the only Green Beret that survives. A shy young man that is bullied by many of his fellow Green Berets for his Southern accent and his crush on Gaby Lopez, he is in fact a very smart guy and a more than capable soldier with exceptional sniper skills as well as a capable pilot. He is asked out by Gaby Lopez and accepts at the end of the book.

=== German BKA team ===
Karl Schroeder The de facto leader after the German leader is killed in the initial rapa attack, he is much like Van Lewen, leading by example and being considerate for his fellow men. He makes the sacrifice play when the team raids the Nazi armada, setting off a chlorine isotopic charge to vaporise the remaining Nazis and allowing the others to escape.

Renee Becker A special agent for the BKA along with Karl Schroeder, she is a kind woman but capable fighter. Race's love interest, she earlier dismisses his brave acts as only the adrenaline talking, but when Race disables the second Supernova, she decides that he is truly as brave as his actions demonstrates, and kisses him. They're seen together at the end of the book.

Uli Peck Masquerading as Nazi soldier Uli Kahr, he infiltrated the Nazis to feed information to the BKA. Rescued Race and Renee from certain execution at the hands of the Nazis and aided them in disabling the Nazi Supernova.

=== Nazi team ===
Heinrich Anistaze Ex-German secret policeman, brutal and lethal, seeks to set up a Nazi ruled world by crashing the U.S. economy with Odilo Ehrhardt's plan and using the thyrium from the idol to fuel the Nazi Supernova. Later brutally killed by William Race by decapitation with the blades of a helicopter.

Odilo Ehrhardt Ex-Nazi guard at a Nazi concentration camp in World War Two. Known as a heartless killer during his time with the Nazi regime. Set up and leads the Stormtroopers, his neo-Nazi regime based in Chile. Is killed by William Race after being shot by Race and then blown up by his own hydrazine explosive trap, while failing to kill Race.

=== Republican Army of Texas ===
Earl Bittiker A former Navy Seal, he formed the Texans as a militia group that raided government buildings. Later merged with the Oklahoma Freedom Fighters and a Japanese doomsday group in order to acquire a Supernova and use it to destroy the world. Killed by William Race after being trapped by Race in a falling tank.

=== Santiago's story ===
Alberto Santiago Main protagonist, Spanish priest and missionary who on his journey with the Spaniards in their quest to conquer the Incas, witnesses the brutality of his countrymen and decides to betray them and help the Incans instead, inspired by the Incans and their spirit and will. Kills Hernando Pizarro to save the idol. Marries Lena, Renco's sister, and later returns to France to write the manuscript.

Prince Renco Capac Incan prince, highly skilled and hailed by the Incans as their hero, imprisoned on a ship, is released by Santiago, and who partners with the latter to confiscate and protect a sacred Incan idol from the Spanish Conquistadors. Presumed killed by Race before Race discovered he in fact survived luring the rapas into the temple, using this information to himself survive the temple.

Lena An Incan princess, she similarly mirrors Renee Becker with Race in being Santiago's love interest.

Bassario The disgraced son of a royal stonemason, he is convicted to prison. Freed by Renco in order to use his skills to construct a fake idol in order to fool Hernando Pizarro. Initially leaves Renco and Santiago to their deaths at the hands of the Spanish conquistadors, but returns in the nick of time to save their lives, proving he was still an honourable man.

Hernando Pizarro The brother of the Spanish conqueror's governor, Francisco, a brutal man who revelled in killing the Incans and stopped at nothing to possess the idol. He was killed by Santiago by being dropped off the rope bridge.

Castino A tribesman of the subjugated Chanca clan, he joined the Spanish conquistadors led by Hernando in order to get revenge on Renco, using his tracking skills to aid the Spanish. He was decapitated by Renco in the final battle atop the temple.
