= Hover Car Racer =

2004 novel by Matthew Reilly

- Author: Matthew Reilly
- Cover artist: Roy Govier
- Language: English
- Genre: Science fiction, sports, thriller novel
- Publisher: Pan MacMillan
- Publication date: 2004
- Publication place: Australia
- Media type: Print (Hardback and Paperback)
- Pages: 438 (hardback edition)
- ISBN: 1-4050-3621-4
- OCLC: 64449525
- Dewey Decimal: 823/.914 22
- LC Class: PR9619.3.R445 H68 2004

Hover Car Racer is a sci-fi/sports/action story written by Australian author Matthew Reilly, originally released as a free fortnightly online serial, and later published by Pan MacMillan in 2004.

The novel, as the book title suggests, is about hover car racing, a sport developed in the early 21st century. The fictional technology of the Magneto drive uses the Earth's magnetic field to counteract gravity. The Magneto drive is used in all forms of modern transport, from cars and buses to cruise liners—and a new breed of racing vehicles, which have evolved from Formula 1 racing cars.

== Plot ==
Jason Chaser is an independent hover car racer, who along with his autistic adoptive little brother—known only as the Bug—are competing in regional races, with hopes of reaching the Pro circuits, but in reality have little chance of doing so.

During a local derby, Scott Syracuse (representing the International Race School) is impressed with Jason's skill, and despite damage to the "Argonaut" placing them last, offers him a position at the IRC for the next season. Jason accepts, and he and the Bug find themselves in Tasmania (now a privately owned training school) along with some of the best student hover car racers in the world. Jason is paired with independent Mech Chief Sally McDuff, who will look after their equipment and pit crew, including a robot named "Tarantula" which will perform most of the actual pit work—changing the magneto drives which enable the hover cars to function, the compressed gas for steering, and the coolant to prevent the magneto drives from melting.

During the first few races, Jason is outclassed and bullied—both on and off the track—by the other racers who all consider him inferior—the perfect Xavier Xonora, his own teammates Washington and Wong, and Barnaby Becker, who Jason already knew from earlier races. Even the equipment seems to be against them as they—and the only female racer Ariel Piper—suffer more than their fair share of faulty mag drives, substandard coolant, and failures on the part of Tarantula. Despite this, and due to their natural talent they begin to rise in the rankings, until it becomes apparent that they both have a chance of becoming two of the top four rated racers who will be invited to take part in the New York Masters.

Ariel and Jason have forged a friendly relationship which becomes soured when Jason is critical of Ariel's decision to use her body to gain advantage and keep in the good grace of Fabian, a ruthless, yet influential French Pro racer. When Fabian dismisses her after Jason beats her in a one-on-one race the two rekindle their friendship, which Jason consolidates when he later overhears LeClerq and Smythe (The Headmaster & stores chief respectively) discussing sabotaging Ariel's pit robot, and at the same time admitting to having been responsible for her and Jason's earlier equipment misfortune.

Jason forewarns Ariel, and the attempt to plant a virus on her pit robot backfires, instead disrupting the entire race power grid, meaning that none of the pit robots work. All racers have to perform a manual pit stop, and due to previously practising such tactics Jason and Ariel not only win the race, but Jason also ensures his place in the New York Masters. At the same time Jason attracts the attention of two individuals—Umberto Lombardi, the billionaire owner of Team Lombardi, and Dido, a beautiful Italian girl who thanks to her rich parents is able to follow Jason around the next few races. Jason agrees to trial race with Team Lombardi, and begins a tentative relationship with Dido, stilted slightly due to his age and inexperience with the opposite sex—a factor which causes Sally to tease him relentlessly.

Prior to the New York Masters Jason is involved in a large and dangerous crash, completely destroying his Team Lombardi hover racer, and with it much of his confidence, however with the aid of Sally & the Bug he regains his nerve, but not before several racers take advantage of his doubts and gain points that otherwise could have been his. Jason and Ariel get their revenge on Fabian when he challenges Jason to an exhibition race while in Italy—but Jason secretly swaps places and it is in fact Ariel who races—and beats—Fabian, thus ridiculing him for earlier comments when he stated that Ariel was "quite frankly, a non-event", also possibly alluding to her night with him.

After again barely winning his next race Jason realises that Dido has been feeding Xavier information, including his doubts and race strategies, and he breaks off the relationship—after which Sally discovers that Dido is in fact Xavier's cousin, and the two are seen in public together.

Jason and Xavier both race in New York, and as Xavier points out he is the far superior racer in every respect—something that Jason is forced to agree with. After reviewing all of Xavier's races Jason formulates a strategy based on not only Xavier's actual superiority, but how he perceives himself as well: Jason realises that Xavier celebrates victory before the race is won, and uses this to surprise him with a late charge and wins whilst Xavier is otherwise distracted already saluting the crowds whilst still on the home straight.

During the rest of the New York races Jason and the Bug slowly collect points, relying on luck as much as skill, and ultimately find themselves in a last race with the world champion Alessandro Romba. After pulling a slight lead the Argonaut II suffers another bout of sabotage and literally meters from the finish line the rear stabiliser wing is destroyed by a tiny explosive charge placed by a corrupt betting agent, Ravi Gupta, who wishes to stack the odds in his favour. In a last desperate manoeuver, Jason uses his car's ejector seat to fire himself—and his steering wheel containing the Argonauts transponder—across the finish line thus winning the championship.

Romba shows himself to be quite different from most of the other pro racers so far encountered, and is not only magnanimous in defeat, but genuinely pleased for Jason, and Jason himself secures a full-time racing position with Team Lombardi.

== Major themes ==
The novel is aimed primarily at a teenage demographic. It bears some resemblance to Orson Scott Card's Ender's Game or Harry Potter, with each of these novels featuring harrowing situations thrust upon young protagonists in a school-like environment.

The book was originally released for free online, in eight parts, before being published in hard-cover format. It was followed by a paperback edition in 2005 to appeal more to a younger market.

== Teaching resources ==
A package of teaching resources was created in early 2006 by Brendan McKinnon. The resources are aimed at giving students from the age of 12 to 16 a more thorough understanding of Hover Car Racer and help them to improve their skills in the areas of English, geography and history.

== Film adaptation ==
Disney bought the rights to the film when the book was still only a manuscript, and had begun the screen-writing process with Alfred Gough and Miles Millar. Other writers like David DiGilio and John Sayles were also involved. Currently it is unknown when the movie will begin production, though the rights are still with Disney as of 2010.

Development was first announced in November 2010, with Fredrik Bond being considered to direct and Blaise Hemingway attached to write. In January 2012, it was announced that Dan Harris was working on the script, which will be entitled "Hovercar".

== See also ==
- Online book
