= Matthew Reilly =

Australian action thriller writer (born 1974)

- Born: Matthew John Reilly; 2 July 1974 (age 52); Sydney, Australia
- Occupation: Novelist
- Spouses: Natalie Reilly (m. 2004; died 2011); Kate Freeman (m. 2023)
- Writing career
- Genre: Action/thriller
- Website: www.matthewreilly.com

Matthew John Reilly (born 2 July 1974) is an internationally bestselling Australian action thriller writer.

== Early years ==
Reilly was born on 2 July 1974 in Sydney, Australia, the second son of Ray (an employee at the Department of Corrective Services) and Denise, a mathematics teacher. He grew up with his brother Stephen in Willoughby, an affluent suburb on the lower North Shore of Sydney, New South Wales, Australia.

Reilly graduated from Sydney's St Aloysius' College in Milsons Point, in 1992. He then studied Law at the University of New South Wales between 1993 and 1997, graduating 31st out of 250 students. While at university, he was also a contributor to the student law society publication Poetic Justice.

== Career ==
Reilly wrote his first book, Contest, at the age of 19, and self-published it in 1996. It was rejected by every major publisher in Australia, leading him to self-publish 1,000 copies using a bank loan. He was discovered when Cate Paterson, a commissioning editor from Pan Macmillan, found a self-published copy of Contest in a bookstore. Pan Macmillan signed Reilly to a two-book deal. He wrote his second book, Ice Station, while studying at the University of New South Wales. It was quickly picked up by publishers in the US, UK and Germany. He has since sold over 8 million copies of his books worldwide, in over 20 languages. Scarecrow and the Army of Thieves was the biggest-selling fiction title in Australia in 2011. Three more of Reilly's books have been the biggest-selling Australian titles of their years of release: Seven Ancient Wonders (2005), The Five Greatest Warriors (2009) and The Tournament (2013). A Sydney Morning Herald reviewer praised Reilly's writing for its bold action, but they criticised it for straining credulity and "frequent lapses in logic."

In 2007, Reilly wrote a half-hour television script titled Literary Superstars. The script was picked up by Darren Star (Sex and the City) and bought by Sony Pictures for the ABC Network. Jenna Elfman signed on to play the lead role. The pilot episode was at the casting stage when the 2007–2008 Writers Guild of America strike began, paralyzing Hollywood. The pilot was placed on indefinite hiatus before ultimately being dropped by the ABC.

In 2015, Reilly, in association with Benjamin Maio Mackay's Preachrs Podcast OnLine & OnStage, premiered an audio drama adaptation of Reilly's best-selling novel Ice Station. This was the first adaptation of his works outside of a literary format. Matthew Reilly’s Ice Station Live was performed in the Adelaide Fringe 2016 and piloted the first three episodes of a proposed full audio drama. As of January 2021, no further updates on the project have been announced.

In 2017, he began to write a story that could be filmed on a moderate budget of around $15 million. This became the screenplay for Interceptor, whereby a female US Army captain at a US missile interceptor facility has to stop sixteen nuclear missiles aimed at sixteen American cities. The film uses one large set. Reilly collaborated with screenwriter Stuart Beattie (Pirates of the Caribbean, Collateral) whose efforts included partially rewriting but also introducing Reilly’s work to several producers and other film people in Los Angeles. This led, eventually, to Netflix funding the film with Reilly as first-time director, with filming being done in Sydney in early 2021 featuring Elsa Pataky in the lead role, with Australian Luke Bracey playing the villain; Pataky’s husband, actor Chris Hemsworth, is one of the movie's executive producers. The film was released in mid-2022 on Netflix.

== Personal life ==
In 2004, Reilly married Natalie Freer. Freer attended a nearby high school, Loreto Kirribilli, and also went to the University of New South Wales, where she studied Psychology. Reilly credits Freer with encouraging him to self-publish his first book. In early December 2011, while Reilly was in South Australia on a book tour promoting Scarecrow and the Army of Thieves, Natalie, who had suffered from anorexia and depression, died by suicide. Reilly subsequently cancelled his remaining book tours and announced on Facebook his intention to take a break from online communications.

"My life pretty much fell apart; she was my everything. We did everything together; we’d done everything together for the previous 18 years. And suddenly I’d have days where I’d look at the clock and it’d be quarter past one in the afternoon, and I’d think: I’ve got ten hours ‘til I’m going to go to bed. I cried every day for six months. I howled in my car. I’d take the dog for the longest of walks that she’s ever had in her life." — Reilly on his wife Natalie's suicide.

Reilly owns several movie prop reproductions such as a life-size statue of Han Solo frozen in carbonite from Star Wars, a golden idol from Raiders of the Lost Ark, and a DeLorean from Back to the Future. A big fan of Hollywood blockbusters, Reilly hoped to one day direct a movie adapted from one of his own stories. He would ultimately get to fulfil this mission when he co-wrote and directed Interceptor.

Reilly has been in a relationship with Kate Freeman, and in 2015 he moved with her to Los Angeles, California. They married in April 2023.

== Bibliography ==
=== Stand-alone novels ===
- Contest (1996; republished in 2000)
- Temple (1999)
- Troll Mountain (2014)
- The Great Zoo of China (2014)
- The Secret Runners of New York (2019)
- Cobalt Blue (2022)
- Mr Einstein's Secretary (2023)

=== Shane Schofield novels ===
See Shane Schofield

1. Ice Station (1998)
2. Area 7 (2001)
3. Scarecrow (2003)
4. Hell Island (2005)
5. Scarecrow and the Army of Thieves (2011), re-titled as Scarecrow Returns in the United States.

=== Jack West Jr novels ===
See Jack West Jr

1. Seven Ancient Wonders (2005), retitled as 7 Deadly Wonders in the United States and The Seven Ancient Wonders after a re-release in Australia in 2021.
2. The Six Sacred Stones (2007)
3. The Five Greatest Warriors (2009)
4. The Four Legendary Kingdoms (2016)
5. The Three Secret Cities (2018)
6. The Two Lost Mountains (2020)
7. The One Impossible Labyrinth (2021)

In addition to the novels, Reilly has written two short stories available on his website:

- "Jack West Jr and the Hero's Helmet" (2016), set before the novel series
- "Jack West Jr and the Chinese Splashdown" (2020), set before the events of The Four Legendary Kingdoms

=== Sam Speedman novels ===
1. The Detective (2025)
2. King's Ransom (2026)

=== The Tournament ===
- The Tournament (2013), set in the year 1546.

In addition to the novels, Reilly has written two short stories available on his website:

- "Roger Ascham and The King's Lost Girl" (2013), a prequel to The Tournament
- "Roger Ascham and the Dead Queen's Command" (2020), a sequel to The Tournament

=== Hover Car Racer ===
- Hover Car Racer (2004)

Published as three mini-books in the United States:

1. Crash Course (2005)
2. Full Throttle (2006)
3. Photo Finish (2007)

=== Short stories ===
- "Rewind / The Fate of Flight 700" (1999), a screenplay for a short film
- "The Mine" (2000)
- "A Bad Day at Fort Bragg" (2001)
- "Altitude Rush" (2001)
- "The Rock Princess and the Thriller Writer" (2002)
- "Time Tours" (2005)
- "Complex 13" (2007)
- "The Dead Prince" (2007)
- "Roger Ascham and The King’s Lost Girl" (2013)
- "Jack West Jr and the Hero’s Helmet" (2016)
- "Roger Ascham and the Dead Queen’s Command" (2020)
- "Jack West Jr and the Chinese Splashdown" (2020)

All of these short stories are available as free downloadable PDFs on Reilly's website.

=== Films ===
- Interceptor (2022) – Netflix
