= Scarecrow (novel) =

Novel by Matthew Reilly

- Paperback Edition Cover
- Author: Matthew Reilly
- Language: English
- Series: Shane Schofield
- Genre: Techno-thriller novel
- Publisher: Pan Macmillan
- Publication date: November 2003
- Publication place: Australia
- Media type: Print (Hardcover)
- Pages: 462
- ISBN: 978-0732911164
- OCLC: 60315778
- Preceded by: Area 7
- Followed by: Scarecrow and the Army of Thieves

Scarecrow is the fifth Matthew Reilly novel, and the third to feature the main character Captain Shane Schofield, USMC. It was released in 2003.

== Plot ==
Majestic-12, a group of the world's richest men, make up a bounty list of fifteen targets that have to be eliminated before 12 noon of October 26. Among the targets is Shane Schofield, who at that moment is on a mission in Siberia with Book II and a group of U.S. Marines. Schofield's team is supposed to meet up with two Delta groups, the leaders of which are also on M-12's hit list. Schofield's unit comes under fire from a group of bounty hunters led by Cedric Wexley and all but Schofield and Book II are killed. Schofield and Book II escape via a hijacked plane owned by a bounty hunter known as the Hungarian.

Meanwhile, in Afghanistan, Schofield's girlfriend Elizabeth Gant leads a group of Marines, along with Mother, to a cave system where Osama bin Laden's number two man is. Schofield races to Afghanistan to find Gant so that none of the bounty hunters can use her to get to him, but arrives too late to save her and she gets captured by a bounty hunter group known as IG-88, led by Damon "Demon" Larkham. Schofield meets a bounty hunter named Aloysius Knight who has been paid to protect him and teams up with him. Knight and Schofield go to save Gant while Book II and Mother go to London to confront another person on the hit list.

Meanwhile, the other people on the hit list are being taken out. Schofield's friend David Fairfax goes to help one of them but the man he is going to help is killed, as is the person Book II and Mother are attempting to meet. Schofield, Knight, and Gant disguise themselves as bounty hunters to get into a castle owned by Jonathan Killian, one of the men in Majestic-12, to find out more about the bounty hunt. While Knight claims the bounty on two heads, Killian sets a trap for Schofield and Gant, forcing them to escape in one of Killian's cars with Wexley's men in hot pursuit, followed by Knight in his Sukhoi . Schofield goes over a cliff and is presumed dead while Knight and Gant are captured.

Mother is picked up by Rufus, Knight's pilot, and goes to help Knight while Schofield is captured by French soldiers and brought to an aircraft carrier to explain to him why he is to be terminated. At Killian's castle, Gant is brutally murdered on a guillotine. However, Knight escapes, Gant's final words being for Knight to tell Schofield she would have said yes to his planned proposal. Rufus, Mother, and Knight go to rescue Schofield.

On the French aircraft carrier, it is revealed that Schofield, along with the fifteen other targets, are the only people who have quick enough reactions to disable the missiles being launched from disguised ships in the Kormoran Project. The plan involves copies of different countries' missiles being launched at their bitterest enemies, resulting in a new Cold War which will bring in huge profits for the members of Majestic-12. Schofield is rescued by Knight, but then Knight reveals to him that Gant was decapitated.

Saddened by Gant's death, Schofield attempts to commit suicide but is stopped by Mother. in the meantime, the President of the United States gives all of the U.S. Armed Forces' resources to Schofield to neutralize the threat posed by the ships. He then directs certain ships to be sunk using torpedoes. At the same time, Fairfax and Book II are flown to different ships so that Schofield can disable all of the missiles at the same time. Schofield succeeds in disabling the missiles, but Mother is presumed to have perished. Schofield later learns that there is a backup plan and a missile is heading right for Mecca on the first day of Ramadan. Schofield is able to deactivate the missile but in turn, M-12 captures Schofield, Rufus, and Knight.

Schofield is about to be killed in the same way and by the same person as Gant was but Mother reveals herself to be alive and Schofield kills Gant's killer while Rufus is injured. Knight and Schofield go to confront Killian and Wexley is killed too. Schofield throws himself and Killian out of a window in a suicide attempt, but Knight saves Schofield.

Several months later, Knight and Rufus meet the person who hired them, Lillian Mattencourt, the richest woman on the planet, who ruined M-12s plan because they would not let her be part of the group as she was a woman. It is also revealed that the rest of M-12 died in mysterious ways. Demon and the IG-88 kill Knight's payer as revenge for taking two of their bounties during the hunt. Later, at Mother's house, Schofield receives a letter from Knight telling him to accept Gant's death and move on. Schofield then goes to the Marine Corps building and says he's ready for duty again.

== Main characters ==
=== Shane "Scarecrow" Schofield ===
Only in his early thirties, Captain Schofield is renowned for his level-headed demeanor and reflexes that afford him the ability to come out of devastating conflict alive. His callsign comes from two vertical scars that run from his eyebrows to his cheeks, over his eyes, wounds he sustained while he was a Harrier pilot for the Marine Corps in Serbia. Although his rank is well below many others in the story, he frequently takes command of the entire United States military; the President personally agreeing to this due to Schofield having saved his life the preceding year. Often resorting to very dangerous strategies to win a battle, it has become the norm for any attempt on his life to end with him escaping while the surrounding environment is more or less demolished. He commands a recon unit of Marines called to aid the Russian government - a trap designed to lead to his death. Upon discovering M-12's plot to change world order, he embarks upon a campaign to ruin the Chameleon and Kormoran projects. He is the protagonist in four Matthew Reilly novels and a novella, Scarecrow being the third novel.

=== Elizabeth "Fox" Gant ===
Gant is Schofield's girlfriend (whom he started dating just before Area 7) and a Marine Lieutenant. It is revealed that Schofield intended to propose to her soon. Gant's callsign was bestowed upon her by admiring male colleagues due to her athletic figure and attractive features. Unlike Schofield and Mother, Gant has neither lightning-fast reflexes nor sheer brute strength and as a result has been seriously injured several times before. That said, she has proven more than capable of holding her own in firefights and hand-to-hand combat in all three Schofield novels. Due to a Marine Corps policy, she has been placed in the command of her own unit rather than in Schofield's. Her other nickname is Dorothy, in reference to The Wizard of Oz, as Gant is in love with Schofield (the Scarecrow), and in The Wizard of Oz, Dorothy likes the scarecrow the most. Gant is viciously beheaded via a guillotine in Killian's Forteresse de Valois by Noonan, an ISS operative working with M-12. Her execution at first drives Schofield to attempt suicide twice, both times failing to do so, but then prompts him to seek vengeance. Gant is a primary character in the first three Scarecrow novels.

=== Gena "Mother" Newman ===
Thirty-four years old, 6'4" in height with a fully shaved head and weighing in at over 200 lbs, Mother's callsign is not meant to convey maternal qualities - rather it is short for Motherfucker. She is ordinarily under the command of Schofield, but begins the story instead as Gunnery-Sergeant to Libby Gant. An encounter with a killer whale in Ice Station has left her with a prosthetic left leg from the knee down (it has served not only to provide mobility but to save her life frequently). Fiercely loyal to Schofield and possessed of a similar luck which has allowed her to survive several near-death experiences- to the extent that it is commented towards the end of the novel that the Grim Reaper, if he exists, is only afraid of Mother-, Mother opts for a violent solution more readily than her unit leader. Her short temper and eccentric nature lead her to many hand-to-hand fights with adversaries often even larger than her. Possessed of a sarcastic wit, she is also the helpful best friend to Gant, often offering advice or insight into her relationship with Schofield. Although in awe of Schofield's achievements- to the point where she has never referred to him as anything other than 'Scarecrow' as she regards him as more than a normal man-, she has managed to evade certain death many times herself and is indispensable to Schofield, both as a soldier and a friend. Mother is a primary character in all four Scarecrow pieces.

=== Aloysius "Black" Knight ===
A bounty hunter hired to protect the "Scarecrow", Aloysius (Pronounced allo-wishus) "Black" Knight was a captain within Delta Team 7, regarded as the "elite within the elite" of the special forces. He became a fugitive from the US during a mission in Sudan, in which he was infiltrating an arms deal involving Osama bin Laden. Despite being in shooting range of the terrorist, Knight was ordered not to attack, allowing the terrorist to escape while Knight was forced to wait for reinforcements. Later, while preparing to board a Black Hawk piloted by his friend Rufus, he overhears his backup being ordered to kill him and his pilot. He finds out later that the men belong to the ICG (Intelligence Convergence Group), a complex web of civilian and military spies whose job is to ensure all intelligence obtained by the United States of America stays solely within the United States of America. He escaped, along with Rufus, and killed 13 of the men pursuing him. He was consequently placed on the FBI Most Wanted List and his family killed in a supposedly botched home invasion. He turned to being a mercenary and after successfully rescuing the daughter of the Russian Vice-President, was given a fighter jet known as the "Black Raven" which Rufus pilots for him, as well as landing privileges at any Russian airfield. He is regarded as the second best bounty hunter in the world after "Demon" Larkham. More than 6 feet (1.8 m) tall, he dresses entirely in black, in keeping to his call sign "Black Knight". Due to an eye disorder, photophobia, he must wear tinted lenses at all times. This weakness is sometimes exploited by others, as removing his shades will cause him to experience immense pain.

It was revealed by Matthew Reilly that the Black Knight was meant to be a dark double to Scarecrow; he also has an eye problem and has had his disagreements with the US government. This is even mentioned in the book, when Mother (upon hearing his biography) remarks that he sounds like a Shane Schofield gone wrong.

=== Buck "Book II" Riley Jr ===
Book II's father, Book, was a loyal friend of Schofield who was killed in the first Scarecrow novel Ice Station. Although initially there was friction between him and Schofield over the death of his father, he has warmed to his new superior and is less cold and brooding than he first was upon joining Schofield's ranks in Area 7. Due to his resemblance to his father he earned the callsign Book II. 25 years old, with a heavy browed face and pug nose, he is described as a "tough-as-nails warrior". Quieter and composed than the others within his regiment, his level-head affords him Scarecrow's respect. Other than Scarecrow he is the only marine to survive the trap in Siberia at the beginning of the novel. Less inclined to combat than Knight and especially Mother, he is very capable of deduction and serves as an accurate information gatherer for Schofield after managing to secure files on M-12 within the Mossad headquarters. Along with David Fairfax he provides Scarecrow with a long-distance electronic link to the Kormoran supertankers, allowing Scarecrow to disarm several missiles from the other side of the world.

== Film ==
After completing the first draft of his most recent book The Five Greatest Warriors, Matthew Reilly was engaged by a Hollywood producer to adapt Scarecrow into a screenplay. It is to be the first in a series of Shane Schofield movies which Matthew Reilly says is okay with him "but structurally it means introducing characters like Scarecrow and Mother and Book and Fox within the framework of the story in Scarecrow, as opposed to (the prequel) Ice Station".

== Allusions ==
- The name of Demon Larkham's bounty hunter team, IG-88 is taken from the robotic bounty hunter IG-88 who cameos in The Empire Strikes Back.
- Aloysius Knight is named after Aloysius Gonzaga, a Jesuit saint who was the namesake of his old high school St Aloysius' College in Sydney, Australia.
- The character of Lillian Mattencourt "the owner of the Mattencourt Cosmetics Empire and the richest woman in the world" is based on the real life Liliane Bettencourt who really is the richest woman in the world and has the biggest shareholding in L'Oreal, the largest cosmetic company in the world, which was founded by her father.

== Criticism ==
- This novel has many parallels with John Gardner's novel Nobody Lives for Ever. In both stories, the returning protagonist (Schofield in Scarecrow, James Bond in NLF) is the target of a monetary contract posted by a villainous organisation (Majestic-12 in Scarecrow, SPECTRE in NLF) that requires delivery of the target's severed head, and both stories include the protagonist's loved ones (Gant in Scarecrow, May and Moneypenny in NLF) being used as leverage against the protagonist. A guillotine is also promptly used to kill the protagonist in an execution style chamber in both Scarecrow and NLF.
