= Martin Cooke (baritone) =

Australian opera singer

Martin Cooke is a baritone singer of opera and classical music. He attended St Aloysius' College, Sydney, New South Wales, Australia.
