= Area 7 (novel) =

Novel by Matthew Reilly

- First edition
- Author: Matthew Reilly
- Language: English
- Series: Shane Schofield
- Genre: Techno-thriller novel
- Publisher: Pan Macmillan
- Publication date: 31 October 2001
- Publication place: Australia
- Media type: Print (hardback & paperback)
- Pages: 596 pp (paperback)
- ISBN: 978-0-333-90626-2
- OCLC: 47063188
- Preceded by: Ice Station
- Followed by: Scarecrow

Area 7 is a novel written by the Australian thriller writer Matthew Reilly. It is his fourth book, published in 2001, and is the sequel to Ice Station.

== Plot summary ==
The President of the United States is visiting America's most secret military installation, Area 7. Assigned to his protective detail is Shane Schofield and his team of Marines including Gunnery Sergeant Gena 'Mother' Newman, Staff Sergeant Elizabeth 'Fox' Gant and Buck 'Book II' Riley Jr. They are plunged into a race for survival when an Air Force general, Charles "Caesar" Russell, unleashes a plan he has been working on for over 15 years. Despite being 'executed' on the day of the president's inauguration, Caesar is revived, and with a squadron of 50 elite Air Force soldiers (the 7th Squadron), have taken control of Area 7 and initiated a lockdown. A transmitter, attached to the president's heart before he was elected, has been activated; a satellite sends and receives messages to and from this transmitter, which is powered by the kinetic energy of the president's heart beating. If the satellite does not receive the messages from the transmitter, 14 Type-240 Blast Plasma-based nuclear warheads in the airports of the major cities of the United States will explode, destroying these cities, and making way for a new, racist, Confederate America. As long as the President's heart beats, the messages will be sent to the satellite, and the nuclear warheads will not detonate. To prevent the president from trying to escape Area 7, Caesar also overrode the launch codes on the Nuclear Football so that to prevent the detonation of the warheads, the president must place his hand on the fingerprint sensor on the Football (that is being kept in Caesar's possession) every 90 minutes.

While moving through the underground complex Gant and her group, including the president, come to a cell block and find a scientist locked inside one of the cells. After being released and questioned, it is discovered that the prisoners being held at Area 7 are "volunteers" that the scientists use to carry out experiments. It soon comes to light that there are ways of opening exits out of Area 7, and that two have already been opened by another scientist, Dr Gunther Botha. In addition to opening two exits, Botha has also shut down main power to the complex, so that it is now running on auxiliary power. Meanwhile, Schofield and his group, after fleeing from the ground level hangar, make their way into the sublevels where they find a bedroom of a 6-year-old boy named Kevin who lives in a cube. Schofield's group then meets up with Riley's group, and the president reveals that the reason for his visit to Area 7 is to check on the progress of a vaccine being developed for the Sinovirus, a genetically engineered virus that differentiates between the amount of pigmentation in a person's skin, allowing it to target only people of a specific race (however people of Asian descent are immune). The president explains that to develop a vaccine for the Sinovirus (and protect America from biological weapons containing the Sinovirus) the scientists had to create a genetically engineered human, a boy named Kevin, whose blood could be used to produce antibodies, and the prisoners being held at Area 7 are used as guinea pigs to test the vaccine. Botha is killed during a chase on Lake Powell the President and Scarecrow escape to Area 8. When they reach it they realise Echo unit from the 7th squadron are being paid 120 million American dollars by the Chinese government to bring Kevin to them. Schofield and the President follow onto the 747 which has a mounted X-38 in an attempt to rescue Kevin. Schofield hijacks the X-38, escaping with the president and Kevin. Later, Schofield and Gant finally face off with Caesar back in Area 7.

=== Characters ===
==== US Marines ====
- Captain Shane "Scarecrow" Schofield : The commander of the US Marines in the President's security, Schofield is the main protagonist of the novel.
- Gunnery Sergeant Gena "Mother" Newman : A Marine and close friend of Schofield. Was presumed to have been killed by the 7th Squadron, but was later revealed to have cheated death. Her call sign is short for motherfucker.
- Staff Sergeant Elizabeth "Fox" Gant : Another Marine who is a close friend of Schofield and Mother. Together with Schofield, the two managed at the last moment to foil Caesar's revolutionary plan. Fox survived the events of the novel.
- Sergeant Buck "Book II" Riley Jr. : A young Marine who is the son of Schofield's deceased and loyal colleague, Book II urges Schofield to find the answers relating to his father's death. Although severely wounded, Book II survived the novel's events.
- Colonel Rodney "Hot Rod/ Ramrod" Hagerty : The pompous White House Liaison Officer, Hagerty is known as an officer who never experienced the full elements of direct combat. After being imprisoned by a serial killer in the base, he attempted to escape Area 7. However, the Marines never found him and presumed he was killed by the thermonuclear blast.
- Sergeant Wendall "Elvis" Haynes : A Marine who is a close friend of Love Machine, Elvis attempted a kamikaze strike on the 7th Squadron Unit, Bravo Unit, to avenge the death of Love Machine. Although Elvis himself was killed, he managed to foil Bravo Unit's attempt in killing the US president and his security detail by inflicting severe casualties among the Unit's members.
- Sergeant Ashley "Love Machine" Lewicky : A Marine and close friend of Elvis, Love Machine was killed during Bravo Unit's attempted assassination on the US president.
- Corporal Gus "Braniac" Gorman : A Marine who is regarded as a genius, Braniac was killed by a decoy vehicle triggered by the Reccondos.
- Captain Tom "Calvin" Reeves : A young and highly skilled Marine officer, Calvin was killed by a raid triggered by Alpha Unit, one of the 7th Squadron units in the base.
- Colonel Michael Grier : The pilot of Marine One, he was killed by 7th Squadron commandos.
- Lieutenant Colonel Michelle Dallas : The copilot of Marine One, she was never mentioned to have escaped Area 7 and was most likely killed around the same time as Grier.
- Lieutenant Corbin "Colt" Hendricks : A Marine who was killed by 7th Squadron Commandos after discovering the deceased members of a US Secret Service Advance Team.

==== The President's Staff ====
- President of the United States : The U.S. president has been labelled as one of two keys in triggering Caesar's long-planned revolution. Although the 7th Squadron commandos in Area 7 attempted to assassinate him, the US president survived the day's events.
- Nicholas Tate III : The President's Domestic Policy Adviser, Tate managed to survive the day's events, although he was horrified by several elements of the novel.
- Warrant Officer Carl Webster: A US Army officer, Webster was responsible for the security of the Football, a briefcase important to the President himself. However, he betrayed the President and leagued with Caesar, triggering his plan by giving him the Football. He was later killed by Mother.

==== US Secret Service ====
- Special Agent Juliet Janson : A member of the President's Secret Service Detail, she survived the day's events, but was severely wounded in the process.
- Special Agent Francis X. Cutler : The leader of the President's Secret Service Detail, he was killed by the 7th Squadron Unit Delta while trying to evacuate the US president.
- Agent Julio Ramondo : A member of the President's Secret Service Detail, he was killed by a raid triggered by Alpha Unit, one of the 7th Squadron units in the base.
- Agent Curtis : A member of the President's Secret Service Detail, he was killed by a raid triggered by Alpha Unit, one of the 7th Squadron units in the base.
- Agent Tom Baker : The leader of a US Secret Service Advance Team, he was killed by 7th Squadron commandos before the day's events.

==== US Defense Intelligence Agency ====
- David Fairfax : A cryptanalyst working for the DIA, Fairfax was responsible for foiling two plans in the novel's events, involving a vaccine against a highly lethal biological weapon known as the Sinovirus.

==== Area 7 Civilians ====
- Doctor Herbert Franklin : An immunologist involved in highly classified projects within Area 7, he was killed by the Reccondos who attempted to steal a vaccine against the Sinovirus and retreat from American soil.
- Kevin : The source of the vaccine against the Sinovirus, both Reccondo commandos and a rogue 7th Squadron Unit attempted to retrieve Kevin from American soil. He managed to escape from the two threats with the help of the Marines and survived the day's events.

==== US Air Force/ 7th Squadron/ Brotherhood ====
- Lieutenant General Charles "Caesar" Russell : A former Air Force General, Caesar is the main antagonist of the novel. The leader of the Brotherhood, a secret and racial military organization, Caesar was the mastermind behind the revolutionary plan involving two elements: the assassination of the US president, and control over the Sinovirus and its vaccine (Kevin). He was killed in the thermonuclear blast of the base while mortally injured, and as a result his long-planned operation ended in failure after it was foiled by Schofield's efforts.
- Colonel Jerome T. Harper : The Commanding Officer of Area 7, Harper was revealed as leagued with Caesar in achieving his revolutionary plan. He was killed in a brutal fashion by Lucifer Leary, a serial killer within the base.
- Major Kurt Logan : The overall commanding officer of the 7th Squadron Units in Area 7 (who were ordered to assassinate the US president) and the commander of Alpha Unit, one of the 7th Squadron Units in Area 7. He was killed by Schofield.
- Captain Bruno "Boa" McConnell : The commander of Bravo Unit, one of the 7th Squadron Units in Area 7. He was killed by Book II.
- Captain Luther "Python" Willis : The commander of Charlie Unit, one of the 7th Squadron Units in Area 7. He was killed by the rogue Echo Unit, in league with the Chinese Government.
- Captain J.K. Stone : The commander of Delta Unit, one of the 7th Squadron Units in Area 7. He was killed by Reccondo commandos as they retrieved Kevin from the base.
- Captain Lee "Cobra" Carney : The commander of Echo Unit, one of the 7th Squadron Units in Area 7. Carney was the leader who betrayed Caesar in retrieving Kevin from American soil and sending him to the Chinese Government with the aid of Chinese agents. He was killed by 7th Squadron commandos after his plan was foiled by Schofield and ended in failure.
- Captain Robert Wu :A former 7th Squadron officer, he was one of four Chinese agents ordered by the Chinese government to remove Kevin from American soil and place him under the control of the Chinese. He was killed by 7th Squadron commandos after the plan was foiled by Schofield and ended in failure.
- Lieutenant Chet Li : A former 7th Squadron officer, he was one of four Chinese agents ordered by the Chinese government to remove Kevin from American soil and place him under the control of the Chinese. He was killed by 7th Squadron commandos after the plan was foiled by Schofield and ended in failure.

==== South African Medical Battalion/ Reccondos ====
There were 12 members of the Reccondo team when they were first written into the book. Only six were ever accounted for, in the three bipod speedboats on the lake.

- Doctor Gunther Botha : A former member of the South African Defence Force, he attempted to retrieve Kevin from American soil in order to commence a lily-white African revolution. He was later killed by Charlie Unit while trying to escape Area 7 via Lake Powell, resulting in his plan ending in failure.

==== Area 7 Prisoners ====
- Seth Grimshaw : The presumed leader of Area 7's prisoners, Grimshaw attempted to escape Area 7 after the majority of prisoners were killed by Harper's Sino Virus agent. He was later killed by Janson.
- Goliath : Seth Grimshaw's right-hand man, he also attempted to escape Area 7 with Grimshaw after the Sino Virus killed most of the prisoners. He was later killed by a Maghook shot by Book II.
- Lucifer James Leary : A serial killer based in Area 7 as a test subject, he is known to have committed several acts of cannibalism during his criminal career. Leary was later killed by Schofield who dropped him into a pool of Komodo dragons.
