= Ice Station =

1998 novel by Matthew Reilly

- First edition
- Author: Matthew Reilly
- Language: English
- Series: Shane Schofield
- Genre: Techno-thriller novel
- Published: 1998
- Publisher: Pan Macmillan
- Publication place: Australia
- Media type: Print (Paperback)
- Pages: 541 pp
- ISBN: 0-7329-0956-2
- OCLC: 39079754
- LC Class: A823.3
- Followed by: Area 7

Ice Station is Australian thriller writer Matthew Reilly's second novel, released in 1998.

Ice Station was presented as a live audio drama at the 2016 Adelaide Fringe Festival.

== Plot summary ==
After a diving team at Wilkes Ice Station is killed, the station sends out a distress signal. A team of United States Force Recon Marines led by Shane Schofield, code named Scarecrow, arrives at the station. At the station he finds several French scientists have arrived, and several more come after the Marines' arrival. The French reveal themselves as soldiers and a fight ensues in the station, claiming the lives of Scarecrow's men Hollywood, Legs and Ratman, along with several scientists and most of the French soldiers, while Mother loses her leg, Samurai is badly injured, and two French scientists are captured.

Schofield decides to send a team down to find an object below the ice where the diving team was going. Later, Samurai is found strangled, leaving the only people he trusts to be one of the scientists, Sarah Hensleigh and another soldier named Montana as he was with them at the time of Samurai's death. Hensleigh, Montana and two other Marines, Gant and Santa Cruz, are sent down to where the diving team vanished. While alone, Schofield is shot and killed. He later wakes up, found to have been accidentally resurrected by his attacker, and is in the care of scientist James Renshaw, the believed killer of one of the other scientists at Wilkes. Watching a video of Schofield's death, they see the attacker and discover it to be one of Schofield's men, Snake. The two capture Snake before he is able to kill the wounded Mother.

Meanwhile in the United States, Andrew Trent and Pete Cameron meet, Cameron being a news reporter and Trent being a former Marine using the alias of Andrew Wilcox to avoid being found by the U.S military who a few years back had tried to kill him. They hear the distress call from Schofield and Trent realizes that what happened to him was happening to Schofield.

The team learns of an impending attack by the British SAS and decide to flee the station. During the escape via stolen hovercraft, Schofield and Renshaw's is pushed off a cliff, Schofield's close friend Book and the step-daughter of Sarah Hensleigh, Kirsty, are captured, while Rebound escapes with four of the scientists. Schofield manages to destroy a French submarine and he and Renshaw begin their journey back towards it. Meanwhile, the SAS Brigadier Trevor Barnaby kills the two remaining French scientists and feeds Book to a pod of killer whales. Schofield returns to the station and manages to kill all of the SAS and Snake, and save Kirsty. Schofield receives a message from Trent with a list of members of a secret service known as the Intelligence Convergence Group (ICG) which includes Snake and Montana.

Gant and her team find what appears to be an alien ship, but which turns out to be a spy plane. Montana kills Santa Cruz, but is killed by mutated elephant seals. Schofield and the two others arrive and Hensleigh reveals herself to be an ICG agent, but is soon killed by a wounded Gant. Remembering the station is about to be destroyed, Schofield, Gant, Renshaw, Kirsty and her pet fur seal named Wendy escape on the spy plane and land on the USS Wasp. They later destroy the spy plane using a guided missile fired earlier. It is revealed that Mother had escaped Wilkes before its destruction and was saved by US forces.

The survivors get to Hawaii where they are nearly killed by an ICG agent before being saved by Andrew Trent, Pete and Allison Cameron, and the captain of the USS Wasp. Renshaw assumes custody of Kirsty since he is her godfather, and Schofield doesn't leave Gant's side until she recovers.

== Characters ==
=== Schofield's marines ===
- Buck 'Book' Riley – Schofield's close friend, who also led Scarecrow's rescue mission in Bosnia. He is fed to killer whales by Brigadier Trevor Barnaby of Her Majesty's Special Air Service.
- Robert 'Rebound' Simmons – A young marine and the team's abseiler, he escapes the Ice Station with the remaining scientists to McMurdo Ice Station.
- Gunnery Sergeant Scott 'Snake' Kaplan – A member of the Intelligence Convergence Group (ICG), along with Montana. Snake, an experienced Marine, betrays the team early in the book and is later killed by Schofield.
- Oliver 'Hollywood' Todd – Hollywood is killed by a fragmentation grenade.
- Lance Corporal Elizabeth 'Fox' Gant – A young female Marine, Gant is one of the few survivors.
- Augustine 'Samurai' Lau – At the start of the book, Samurai is mortally injured by the French, and later is suffocated by Snake while in a coma.
- Mitch 'Ratman' Healy – Killed by the French early in the book.
- Georgio 'Legs' Lane – Team's medic, killed by the French then eaten by killer whales.
- Gena 'Mother' Newman – An older female Marine, Mother survives but loses a leg to a killer whale.
- Morgan 'Montana' Lee – An ICG member along with Snake.
- Jose 'Santa' Cruz – Killed by Montana by stabbing him through the ear into his brain.

=== Other characters ===
- Sarah Hensleigh (née Parkes) – Scientist, member of the ICG (revealed late in the book) killed by Gant. Stepmother of Kirsty.
- James Renshaw – Scientist at the station, survives and aids Schofield's escape from the station, and aids in Scarecrow's recapture of the station.
- Trevor Barnaby – Brigadier of the Special Air Service who has never failed a mission. Killed by Schofield when he shoots out one of the windows of the diving bell, causing the diving bell to implode and crush Barnaby.
