= Elephant Rock =

Elephant Rock can refer to: Elephant Rock, located in Payson, Arizona at the iconic 13th hole of the Rim Clubhouse golf course.

== Landmarks ==
- Elephant Rocks (Antarctica), a rock formation in the Palmer Archipelago, Antarctica
- Elephant Rocks (Western Australia), a beach in Australia
- Elephant Rock, a rock formation near Hopewell Cape, New Brunswick, Canada
- Elephant Rock (Iceland), a volcanic rock in the Iceland Sea
- Elephant Rock (Italy), a large boulder and archaeological site in Sardinia, Italy
- Elephant Rock (Valley of Fire), a summit in Nevada, US
- Elephant Rocks (New Zealand), a rock formation near Duntroon, New Zealand
- Elephant Rock (Saudi Arabia) (Elephant Mountain), a sandstone outcrop, Al-Ula, Saudi Arabia
- A rock formation in Nasca Province, Peru
- Ethagala (The Elephant Rock), a rock that overlooks the town of Kurunegala, Sri Lanka
- Elephant Rock, Hartlepool, a former rock formation in Hartlepool, England, UK
- The original name of Eagle Rock in the Santa Monica Mountains, California, US
- An alternative name for Egg Rock in Nahant Bay, Massachusetts, US
- Elephant Rocks State Park, in Missouri, US
- Elephant Rock (Wheatland County, Montana), a mountain in Wheatland County, Montana, US
- A stone landmark in Kings Canyon, Utah, US
- A rock island off the coast of Molokai in Hawaii, paired with a smaller one.
- An iconic rock formation located in Payson, AZ at the 13th hole within the Rim Clubhouse golf course.

== Inhabited places ==
- Anekal ('Elephant Rock' in Kannada), Bangalore Urban district, Karnataka, India
- Batu Gajah ('Elephant Rock' in Malay), Kinta District, Perak, Malaysia

== Other uses ==
- Elephant Rock Books, a major, independent publisher based in Connecticut, USA
- Elephant Rock Ride, an annual cycling event in Castle Rock, Colorado, USA
- "Elephant Rock", a track on the Upsetters 14 Dub Blackboard Jungle album
