= Archaeology of the Arabian Peninsula =

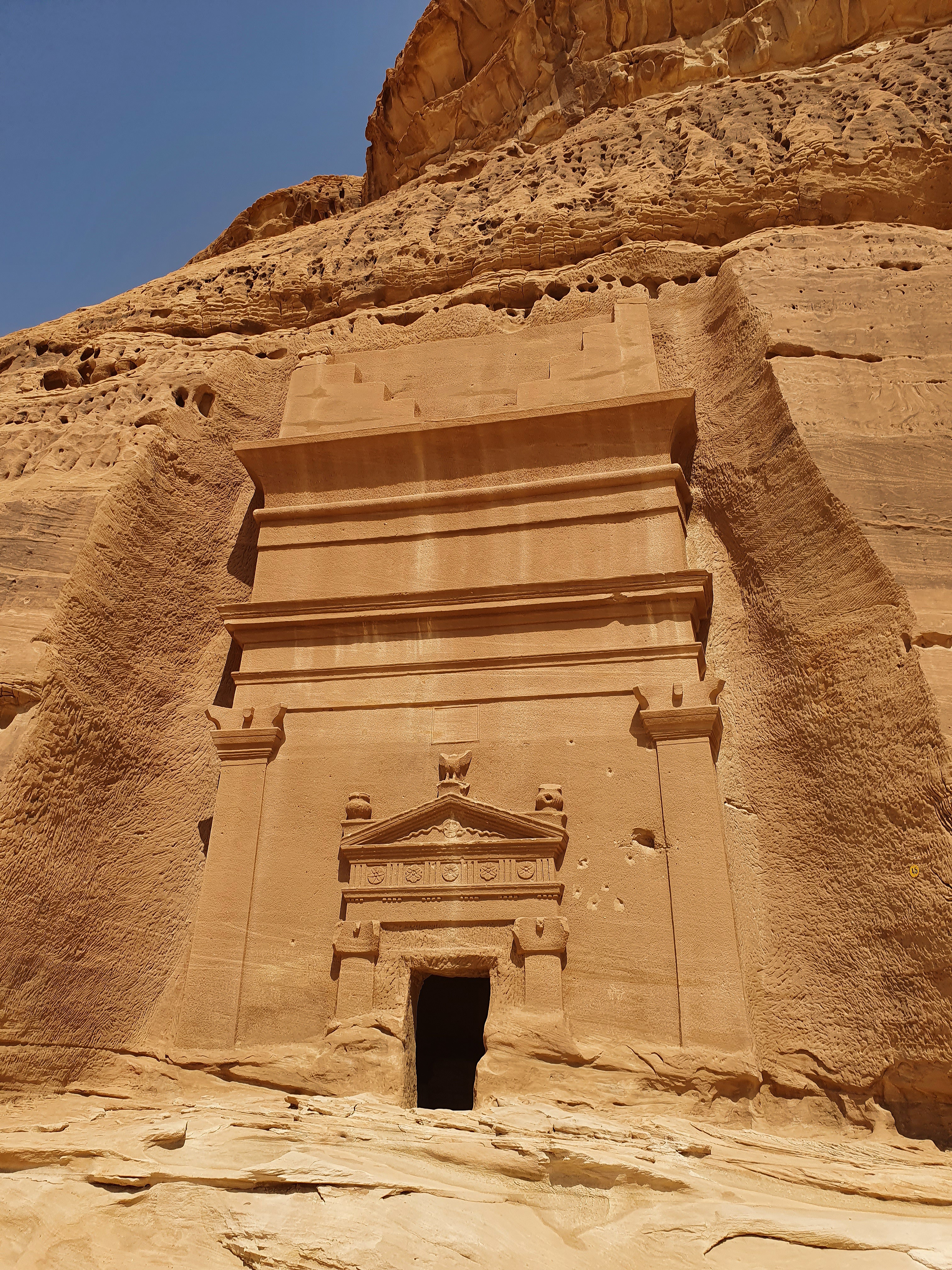
Hegra (Madain Salih), tomb in Qasr al-Bint (Arabic: قصر البنت) necropolis

Arabian archaeology, or the archaeology of the Arabian Peninsula, is the study of past societies on the Arabian Peninsula through surviving artefacts of human material culture. It is the only source of information for the period of Prehistoric Arabia, before written documentation of the region began, and one of the main sources of information for pre-Islamic Arabia, especially through the study of epigraphy and use of pre-Islamic Arabian inscriptions.

Many archaeological sites from the Arabian Peninsula have considerable cultural importance. In 2008, the Hegra Archaeological Site in Al-Ula became the first place in Saudi Arabia to be recognized by UNESCO as a World Heritage Site. On 25 January 2023, seven sites from Yemen, called the Landmarks of the Ancient Kingdom of Saba, Marib, were designated as World Heritage Sites. These are the two ancient cities of Marib and Sirwah, the Temple of Awwam, the Barran Temple, and three locations of the Marib Dam site (its Northern Bank, the Southern Bank, and the Dam of Jufaynah).

In recent years, many major new findings have been made by the field of Arabian archaeology. This includes the discovery of monumental stone structures at the Al Ha'it Oasis and thousands of years of rock art at the Al-Ula region. An extensive Hellenistic and Mediterranean repertoire of objects and artistry has been found at Qaryat al-Faw in Central Arabia, and fortified towns dating back four thousand years in the Khaybar Oasis.

== History and field ==
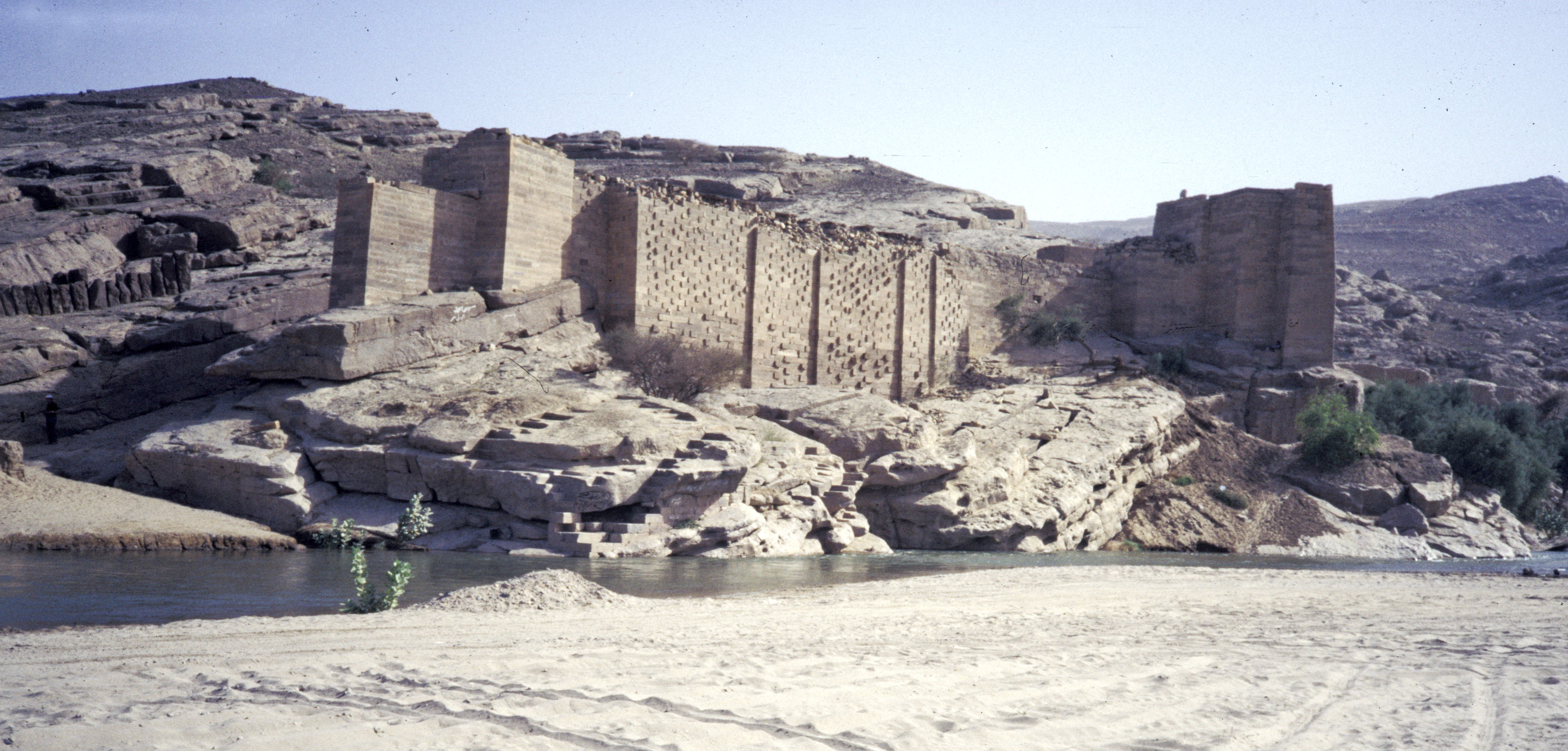
A photo of the ruins of the Great Dam of Marib, taken in 1988

The earliest scientific interest in the Arabian Peninsula began with Dutch explorers in the 17th century, and for the next couple hundred years, remained among lay Western writers including travellers and Westerners stationed in the area. In the mid-19th century, the study of the Arabian Peninsula became a proper academic field, situated at academic institutions (such as universities and libraries) with dedicated professors and scholars to the area matter. In the 1960s and 1970s, the field was joined by legal scholars, and social scientists, the first international conferences were held, and interdisciplinary projects and books began to address the area matter. It was also during these decades that local governments began to take up a more active interest in the discovery of the archaeological past of the region:

Aware of the importance of the country's archaeological heritage, the Council of Ministers of the Kingdom of Saudi Arabia decided in 1383 H./1963 to found a department devoted to the discipline as part of the Ministry of Education. In 1392 H./1972 a royal decree approved the creation of a Supreme Council of Antiquity in charge of outlining the department's main activities and overseeing its operations. The adoption of ambitious development plans in the early 1390 H./1970s enabled the council to enlarge its scope of action, compiling a register of archaeological sites, taking steps to ensure their preservation and creating new museums.

Nevertheless, compared to other Middle East studies, the area remained fringe and the least-studied, until the boon in Yemeni Studies in the 1970s and then Gulf studies in the 2010s, facilitated by a reduction in censorship and allowance of greater academic freedom by regional governments. As a result, the field became mainstream, with the release of many significant books, new journals, and academic centers and organizations. Major organizations include the International Association for the Study of Arabia (IASA) and the Association for Gulf and Arabian Peninsula Studies (AGAPS), while significant initiatives include the Arabian Gulf Digital Archive and the Qatar Digital Library.

=== Journals ===
Numerous journals have since been launched, including:

- Arabian Archaeology and Epigraphy (launched in 1990)
- Arabian Studies (1974)
- Atlal: The Journal of Saudi Arabian Archaeology (1976)
- Journal of Arabian Studies (2011)
- Proceedings of the Seminar for Arabian Studies (1971)

=== Archaeological surveys, missions, and expeditions ===
- Comprehensive Archaeological Survey Program in Saudi Arabia
- Badia Epigraphic Survey Project in Jordan
- Madain Saleh Archaeological Project
- AlUla Archaeological Landscape Survey
- al-'Ula-al-Wajh Survey Project
- Saudi-Italian-French Archaeological Mission at Dümat al-Jandal

== Neolithic period ==
=== Dark Millennium ===
Archaeological evidence indicates that the Arabian Peninsula experienced a prolonged phase of extreme aridity from much of the fourth millennium BC to parts of the third millennium BC (approximately 5900 and 5300 years ago), commonly referred to as the Dark Millennium. This period followed earlier Holocene humid conditions and was marked by widespread environmental stress, including the contraction of lakes, wetlands, and vegetation. Many regions, such as Qatar and the United Arab Emirates, have a dearth of archaeological sites dating to this timeframe. The period also coincides with the decline of Ubaid cultures. While some archaeologists consider much of the Arabian Peninsula to be abandoned during this interval, recent research instead suggests regional variation.

In northern Arabia, continued occupation was supported by shallow aquifers, seasonal water bodies, and oases such as Jubbah, Saudi Arabia. Archaeological sites around Jubbah indicate repeated use by pastoral groups, even during severe droughts, with evidence including wells, runoff-capture features, and oasis enclosures. In contrast, southeastern Arabia, which lacked comparable groundwater resources, experienced large-scale abandonment of its interior deserts. Populations increasingly relocated to the Persian Gulf coast, where livestock herding and fishing economies developed. Despite this shift, archaeological evidence suggests that coastal communities also faced nutritional stressors during this period.

== Notable discoveries ==
=== Rock art of Al-Ula ===
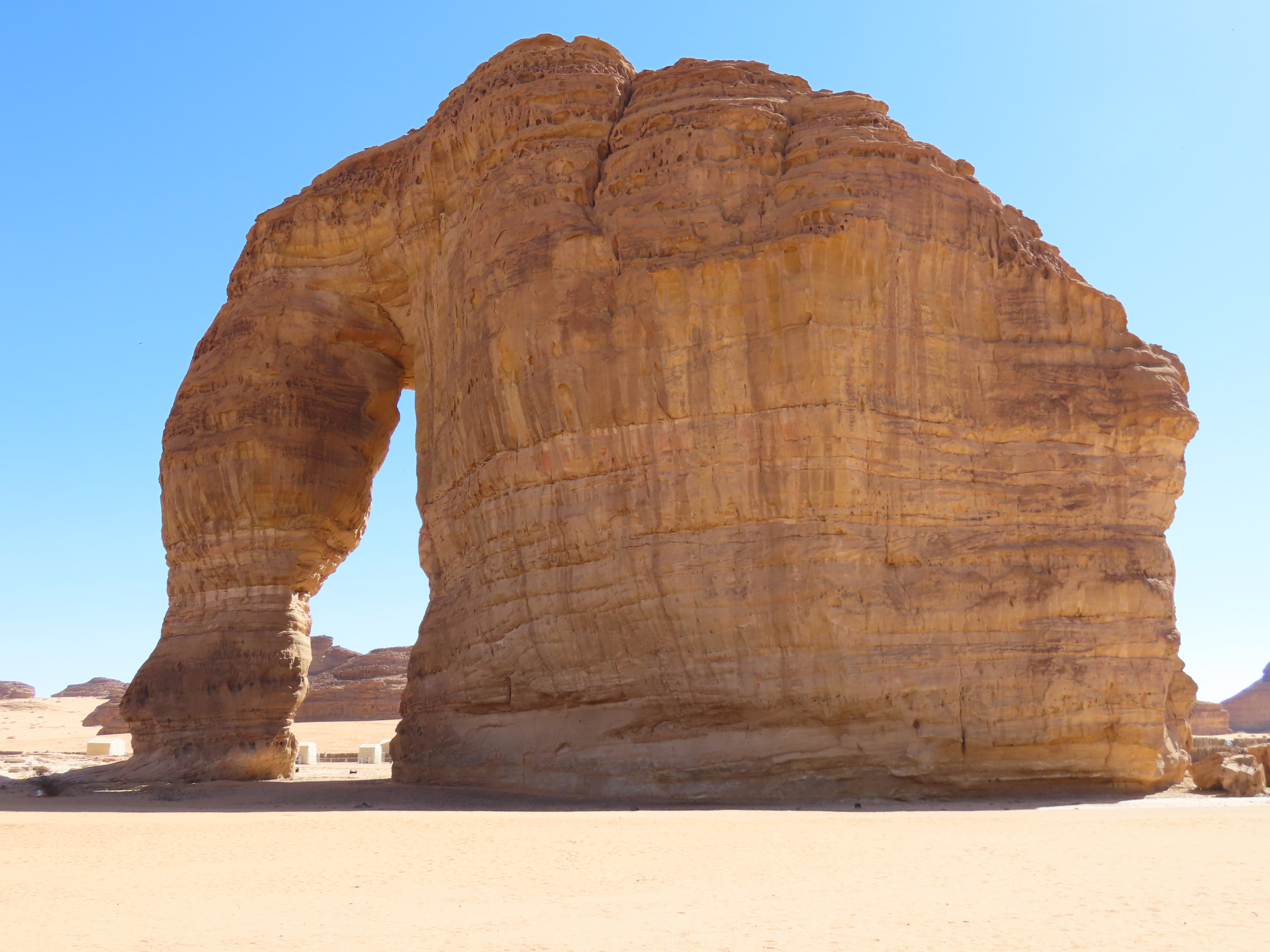
The Iconic Elephant Rock in al-Ula

The rock art of the Al-Ula region represents one of the most extensive and chronologically deep corpora in northern Arabia, spanning over 12,000 years from the early Holocene to the recent past. Documented through the Identification and Documentation of Immovable Heritage Assets (IDIHA) Project (2018–2021), which systematically surveyed approximately 1,000 km² around the Al-Ula valley and oases, the survey recorded 19,802 identifiable rock art panels containing tens of thousands of individual motifs, predominantly engravings (with only 143 painted panels).

The majority of the corpus are engravings, and more rarely, through incisions. Over 100 paintings have been documented, mostly done in red pigment, often depicting architectural or tent-like structures. The most common motif found in them are of animals, followed by human figures and, most rarely, plants, objects, and structures. Animals appear in interactive scenes such as hunting, herding, and battles, but most commonly, as isolated figures.

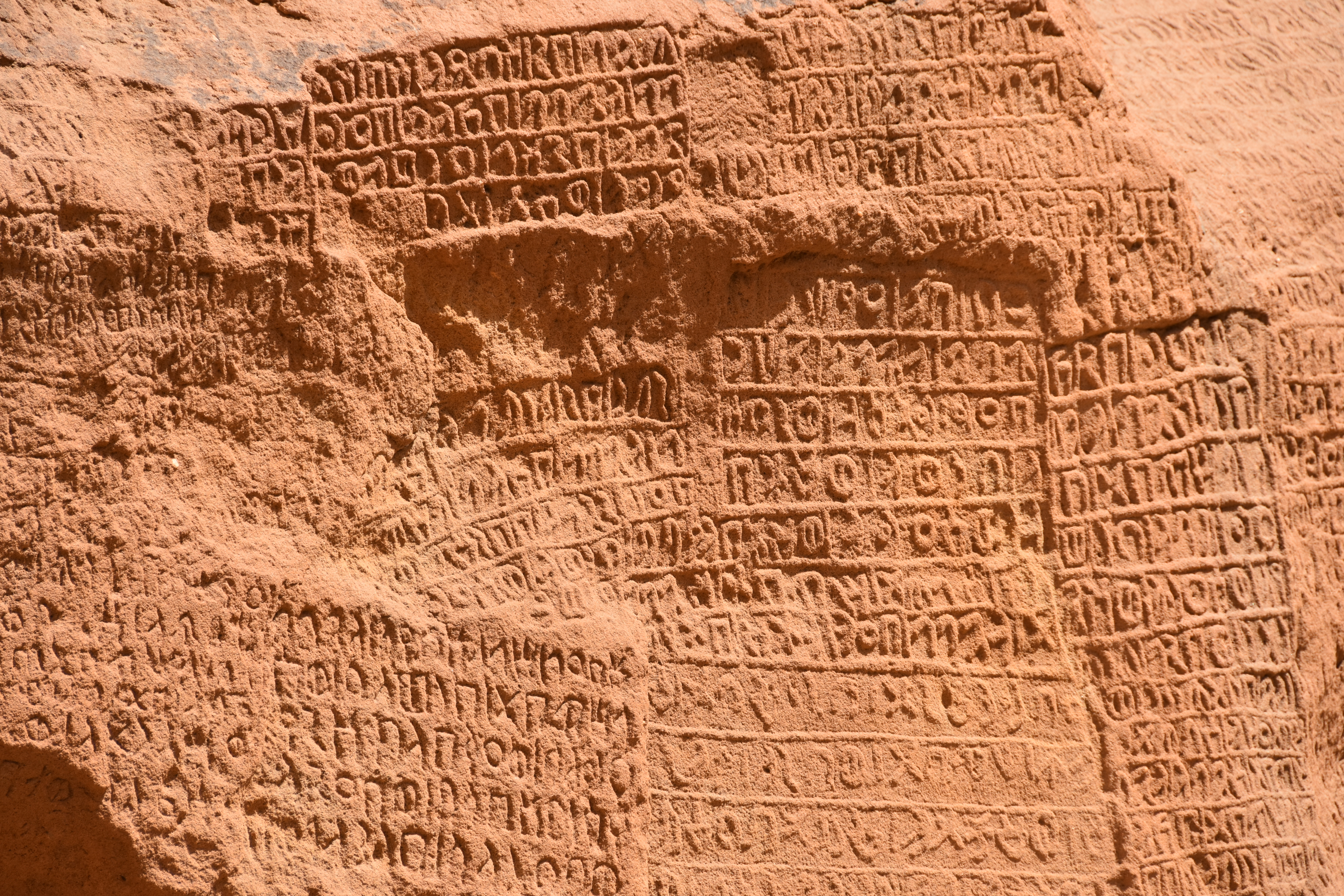
Ancient Arabian rock art at Jabal Ikmah, dating to the 1st millennium BCE

The rock art is divided into broad chronological phases:

- Early Holocene (~10,000 BCE onward): Rare but distinctive life-sized, highly naturalistic engravings of wild fauna (e.g., wild camels, African wild ass/equids with shoulder stripes, ibex, aurochs), often detailed with eyes, muscles, and coat patterns; no human figures or interactions; clustered near water sources along escarpments.
- Pre-Neolithic/Neolithic (broadly Holocene humid period, ~8000–4000 BCE): Medium-sized, stylized depictions in the "Jubbah style" tradition, including hunting scenes with bows, arrows, dogs, and prey (equids, lesser kudu, gazelles); iconic long-horned cattle (lyre-shaped or forward-pointing horns, often with coat/geometric markings or hoof-prints); rare sheep/goat; human figures mostly simple stick forms (Jubbah-style conventions known but infrequently applied); predator conflicts (e.g., lions attacking herds); ibex dominant symbolically.
- Bronze Age (early 3rd millennium BCE onward): Sparse and harder to identify; limited markers include human figures with lunate pommel daggers and "bracket-like" or "lizard-like" postures; occasional stylized cattle; lighter varnish accumulation.
- Iron Age to pre-Islamic (1200 BCE–6th century CE) and post-Islamic periods (7th century CE–modern): Small, stylized engravings lacking heavy varnish; massive emphasis on domesticated camels (over 50% of identifiable animals, often with riders, hobbled, or in herds; raiding/hunting scenes); horses with riders (far more frequent than camels in battle contexts, reflecting prestige); ibex hunting with dogs; ostrich motifs (hunting, possible herding, eggs); rare cattle persistence in oases; battle scenes, herding, carnivore conflicts (lions, leopards, etc.); riders on horseback/camelback; objects (e.g., firearms, motor vehicles, coffee pots) in later phases; Ancient North Arabian scripts often associated.

Overall, early rock art reflects wetter conditions with wild fauna and pastoralism, whereas in the late rock art, we see a depiction of arid adaptation, oasis settlement, camel/horse domestication, trade routes, warfare, and hunting/herding. Ibex remain prominent across periods, whereas cattle sharpyl decline in the post-Neolithic period. The Al-Ula corpus is thought to rival the major northern Arabian sites, like Jubbah and Shuwaymis, and are an end-product of the place of Al-Ula as a cultural and an economic hub across the desert trade networks.

=== Tombs of Hegra ===
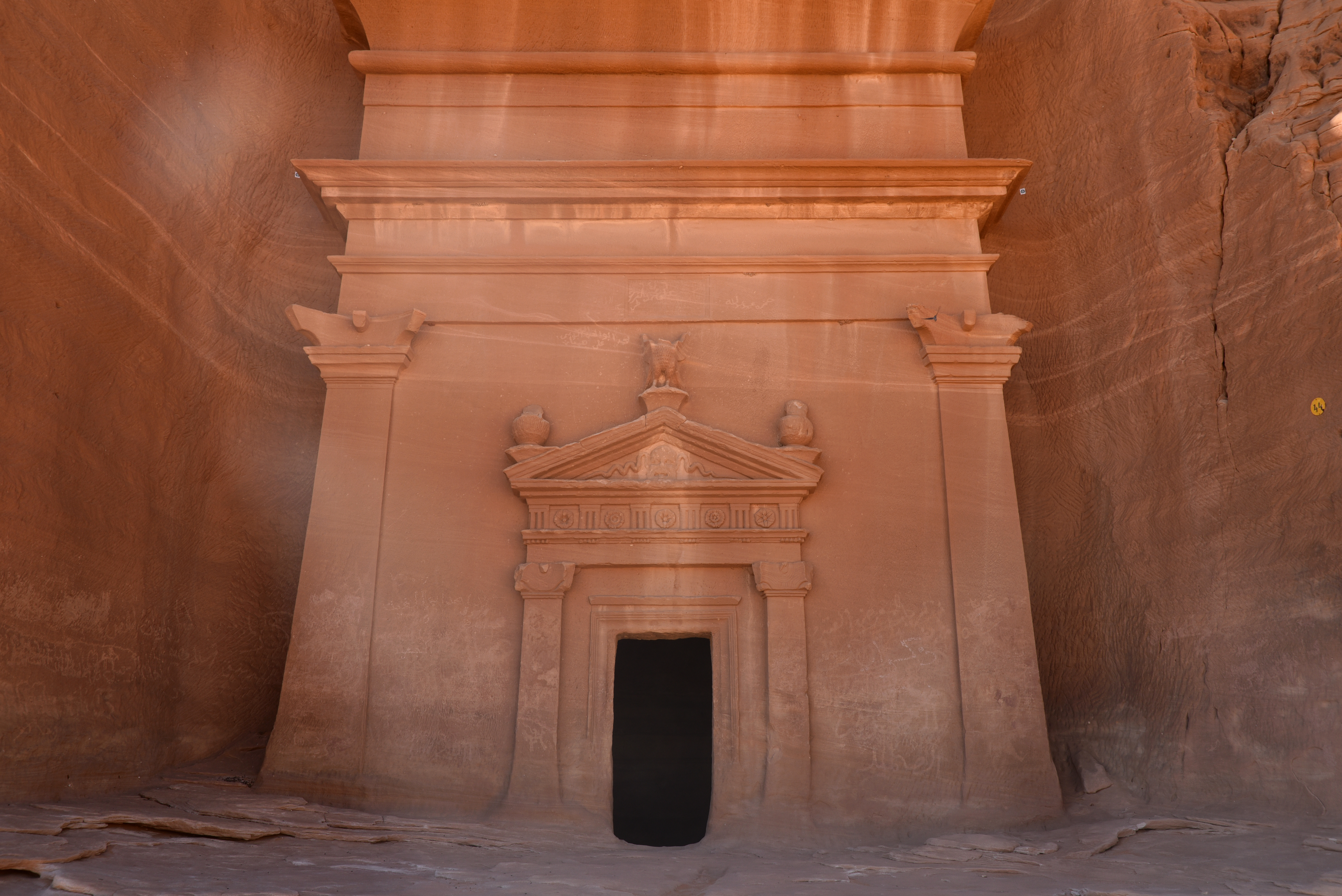
Tomb of the physician Kahlān, located on the eastern side of the Qasr al-Bint outcrop

Funerary monuments are the most prominent and best-preserved remains at Hegra. As at Petra, rock-cut tombs dominate the archaeological landscape, but at Hegra they are often preserved in better condition. The funerary record includes three main types: monumental rock-cut tombs, simple trench graves, and tumuli, reflecting social hierarchy and long-term use of the site.

The monumental tombs are carved into the sandstone outcrops surrounding the urban centre and were deliberately oriented toward the city to maximize visibility and commemorate elite families. These tombs form several necropolises encircling the settlement. In contrast, trench graves, cut directly into the bedrock, are found on the summits of the crags and were intended for non-elite individuals; thousands have been documented. Tumuli, consisting of stone mounds, are mainly located on plateaus west of the city. Excavation of one tumulus revealed a tower-tomb structure that may predate the Nabataean period but was reused between the first century BC and early third century AD.

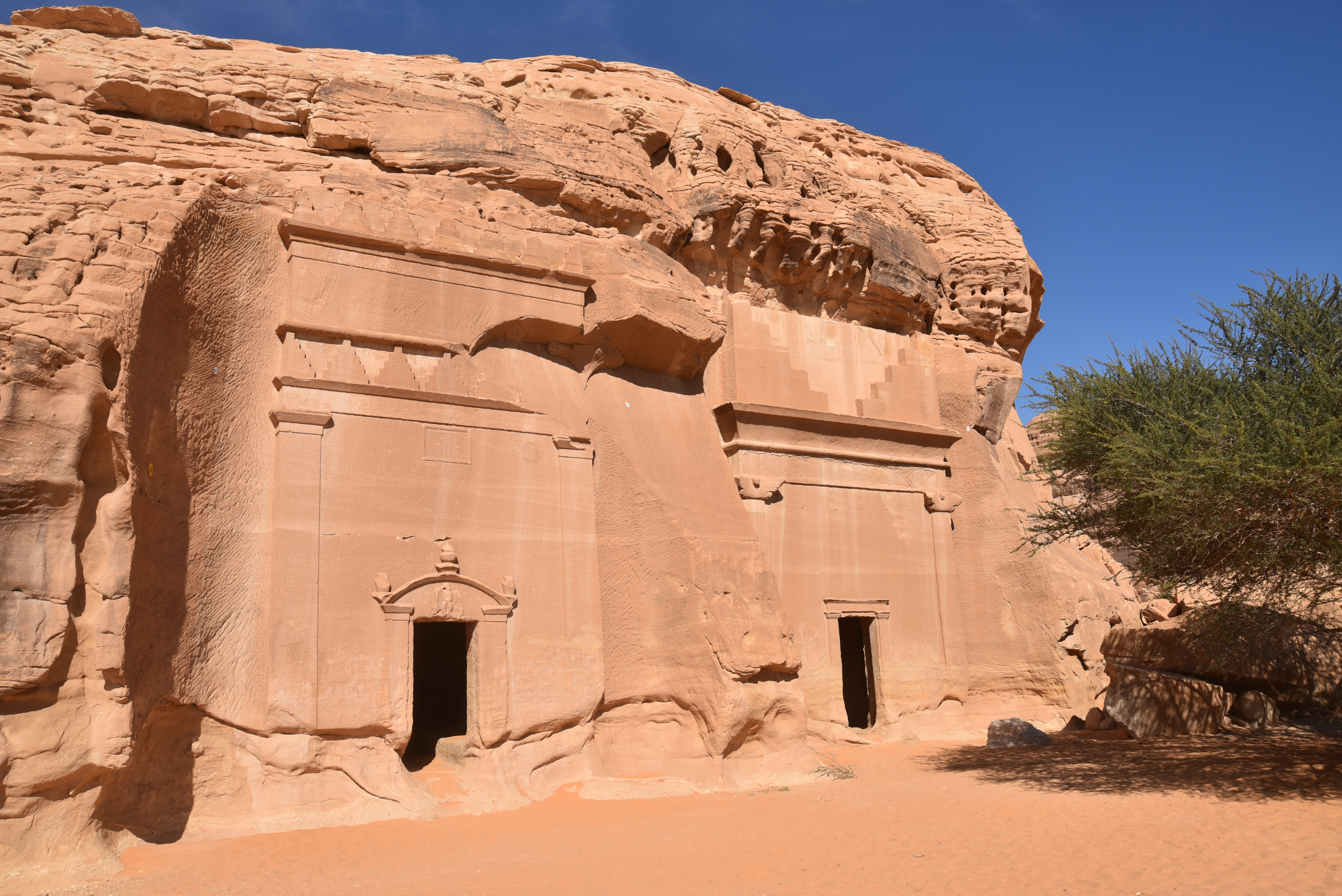
Two well-preserved medium-sized tombs at Qasr al-Bint in Hegra, a famous necropolis discovered in Hegra

Eighty-six monumental tombs display carved facades belonging to a distinct Nabataean architectural tradition. Several stylistic groups have been identified, including early "proto-Hegra" types and a later "Hegra type," distinguished by the presence of an attic. Tomb size varies greatly, from modest façades to monumental examples over twenty metres high, the largest of which is called al-Farid.

Unlike most tombs at Petra, many Hegra tombs bear Nabataean inscriptions carved above the entrance. These functioned as legal documents recording ownership, burial rights, prohibitions, and dates based on the reigns of Nabataean kings. The tomb owners belonged to the urban elite and included both men and women, as well as officials and professionals. Internally, tombs were collective family burial chambers containing multiple graves cut into walls or floors and added over time, reflecting prolonged and repeated use across generations.

=== Hellenistic repertoire of Qaryat al-Faw ===
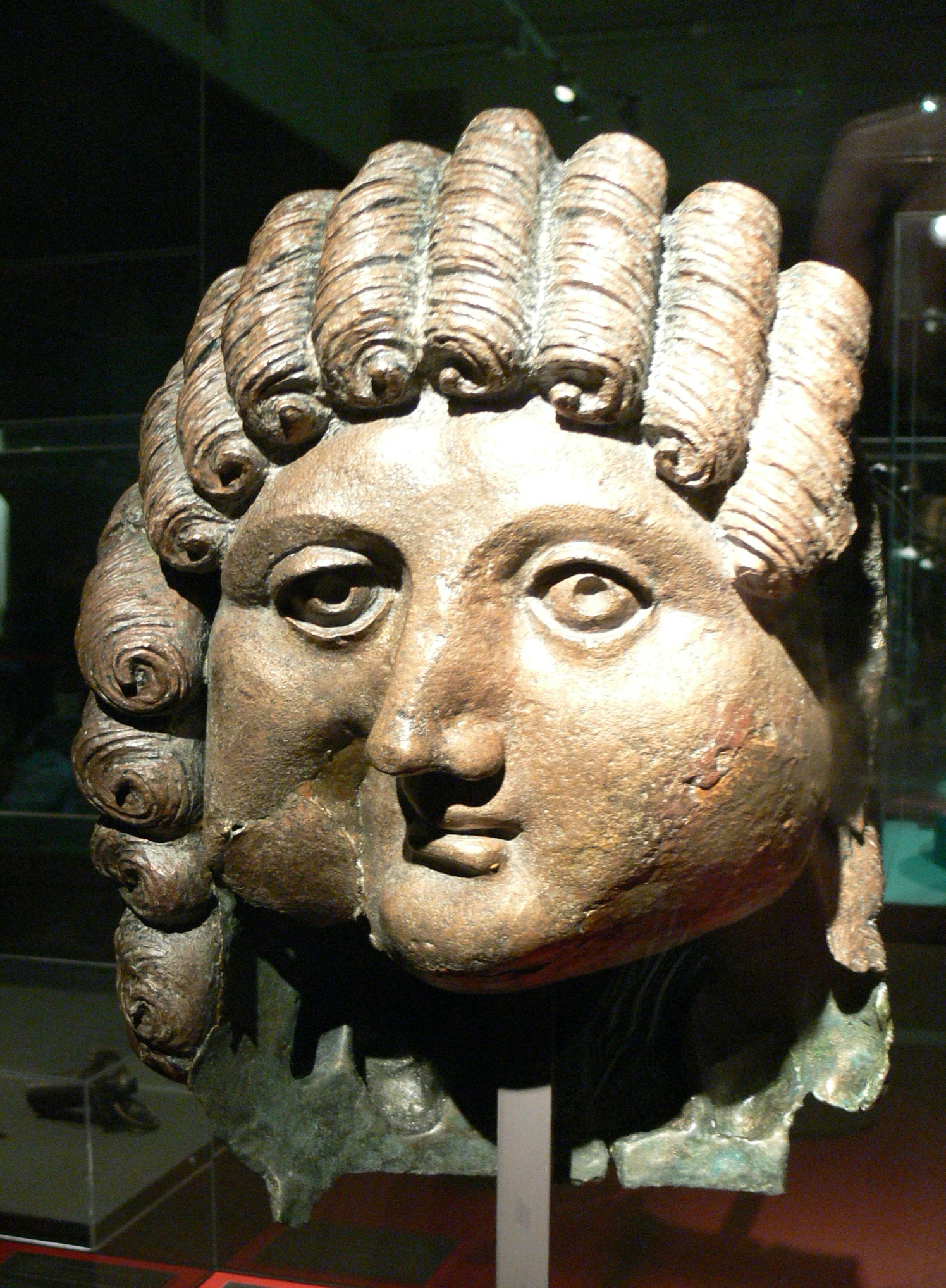
Cast-bronze head of a man found at Qaryat al-Faw

Excavations at Qaryat al-Faw shows that the site was strongly integrated into the Hellenistic period and late antique cultural world, with its Hellenization was selective mediated through Egypt. A temple of the sun god Shams has been found, containing a mrzḥ, a ritual banqueting institution that had absorbed Hellenistic forms such as the symposium by the Roman period. The mrzḥ at Qaryat al-Faq is also the easternmost epigraphically attested mrzḥ, demonstrating that Hellenized cult practices extended deep into central Arabia.

The frescoes decorating the mrzḥ clearly reflect a process of Hellenization. Their iconography (including reclining banqueters, vine scrolls, erotes, amphorae, chariots, and Roman dress) belongs to a shared Mediterranean visual repertoire. Stylistic analysis finds close parallels with Egyptian Fayum mummy portraits, including hierarchical scaling of figures, vegetal wreaths rendered as dotted halos, pink rose garlands associated with funerary rites, and symbolic fruits linked to regeneration and the afterlife. These motifs align with the function of the mrzḥ as a funerary banqueting space and reflect a Hellenized funerary ideology expressed through Egyptian visual language.

== See also ==
- Al-Okhdood
- Ancient South Arabian art
- Ancient towns in Saudi Arabia
- Archaeology of Oman
- Archaeology of Qatar
- Archaeology of the United Arab Emirates
- Desert kite
- Dhahran Burial Mounds
- Islamic archaeology
- Jawan Tomb
- List of archaeology sites of Saudi Arabia
- Mustatil
- Near Eastern archaeology
- Prehistoric Arabia
- Sasanian archaeology
- Tayma stones
