= Prehistoric Arabia =

Period of Arabia before documented history

Prehistoric Arabia, or the prehistory of Arabia, refers to the era of the Arabian Peninsula that predates the start of recorded history in the region that came about at the dawn of Arabia's earliest kingdoms. Some define "Prehistoric Arabia" as the period between 10,000 and 1,000 BC, whereas others put its starting point all the way back to the time of the earliest hominin species two million years ago.

The study of prehistoric Arabia is largely comes from the field of Arabian archaeology. Compared to research on the prehistory of other major world regions, research into Arabian prehistory has progressed slowly, because of the harsh desert environment of the Peninsula, historical restrictions in entry, and limited infrastructure for navigating the region, especially the desert interior. It has been said that the Arabian Peninsula "remains one of the last great unexplored regions of the ancient world".

== Geography ==
The Arabian Peninsula is a region of great ecological and environmental diversity and gave rise to distinct forms of human occupation throughout the region. It has an area of 2.5 million km^{2} and includes the modern-day regions of Saudi Arabia, Yemen, Oman, the United Arab Emirates, Qatar, Bahrain, Kuwait, and parts of Jordan. The Peninsula has 7,000 km of coastline, and most of the interior is covered by vast wastelands called dunes.

== Paleolithic ==
The initial occupation of Arabia by hominins, the ancestors of modern-day humans (Homo sapiens), has been established during the Paleolithic period. The earliest evidence for hominin activity comes in the form of the discovery of archaeological sites where they lived, and the products they manufactured, instead of remains of the individuals themselves. The earliest evidence for hominin activity has been the discovery of the remains of stone tools manufactured between 500,000–300,000 years ago in northwestern Saudi Arabia at Ti's al Ghadah, during a period of "Green Arabia". Two-hundred-thousand-year-old stone tools were discovered at Shuaib Al-Adgham in the eastern Al-Qassim Province, which would indicate that many prehistoric sites, located along a network of rivers, had once existed in the area. Acheulean tools found in Sadaqah, Riyadh Region reveal that hominids lived in the Arabian Peninsula around 188,000 years ago. Habitation of Arabia by modern-day humans (Homo sapiens) may have occurred as early as 130,000 years ago. The earliest human fossils known from Arabia, and the only pre-Holocene fossils, are Al Wusta-1 (AW-1), reported in 2018. These date from ~95–86 thousand years ago, and are the oldest known human fossils globally outside of Africa and the Levant, demonstrating that early human expansions stretched far into the semi-arid Arabian grasslands.

Occupation was not continuous. It featured constant episodes of expansion, contraction, and incursions from adjacent regions. The constant flux is the primary characteristic of the predominant model in understanding Arabian demographics during this period, which has been called by some the Arabian Menschenpumpe ("Arabian human pump"). Due to the largely dry climate of the Arabian Peninsula, early human occupation is closely linked to periods that saw elevated levels of precipitation. These periods favor the spread and intensification of human settlements in Arabia as they allow an expansion of vegetation, a rise in faunal diversity, and the emergence of lakes and long-lasting rivers. Evidence shows that periods of elevated rainfall, especially between 240–190 thousand years ago (ka), 130–75 ka, and 60–50 ka, correspond to periods when well-developed archaeological records and evidence for the proliferation of human settlements peaks. Conversely, no evidence for any human occupation has been discovered in several suddenly arid periods, when depopulation events may have occurred in response to climactic changes. More recent data suggests that while wetter periods did play an important role in shaping human presence in the Peninsula, periods of human occupation were not strictly limited to them.

Archaeologists have continued to debate about where the humans who came to occupy Arabia came from. A series of stone tool assemblages from the excavations at Jebel Faya, found in the coast of Eastern Arabia dating to 127–95 thousand years before the present show strong similarities with the stone tool technology in north and eastern Africa, supporting the view that humans migrated from Africa into Arabia, first moving into the coastline, and later, travelling and settling further into the interior of the peninsula. By the early Holocene period, growing evidence supports humans settlement into southwestern and inland Arabia.

=== Stone tool industry ===
An Acheulean culture of stone tool manufacturing has been identified from several archaeological sites in Arabia, indicating that it was widespread in the peninsula. The best-known example is from an archaeological excavation at Saffaqah, located in the Dawadmi region of Saudi Arabia, dated to 240–190 kya, making it the youngest Acheulean culture known from West Asia.

== Neolithic ==
The Neolithic began 11,700 years ago with the advent of agriculture setting off a series of events that cumulatively led to rapid advances in societal and technological complexity. Different parts of the world began their transition to agriculture at different times, and no agricultural revolution took place in the Arabian Peninsula in the early phase of the Holocene, unlike much of the rest of the Fertile Crescent, though Arabian populations did interact with agricultural and sedentary populations in this time period. Instead, nomadic pastoralism continued to characterize the region for thousands of years. Between 11,000 and 6,000 years ago, a large population expansion happened in Arabia, indicated by a large expansion in the number of known archaeological settlements that date to this period.

By the early Neolithic period, human settlements began to appear in southwestern and inland Arabia. By the sixth millennium BC, the Neolithic economy had transitioned into an economy of nomadic pastoralism, and large groups of nomadic pastoralists occupied the Arabian coasts, deserts and inland plains. Archaeologists have debated the cause and origins of the transition to nomadic pastoralism, and its corresponding technologies. The first mainstream explanation for this is the Levantine hypothesis, which argues that the technologies and animals used for this mode of subsistence came from the southern Levant, which had a strong tradition of nomadic pastoralism much earlier than Arabia did, and whose technological practices resemble the remains found from early Arabian nomadic pastoralism. A second school of thought argues that nomadic pastoralism and the Neolithic economy was an internal development of Arabia. Nomadic pastoralism did not spread into the area through migration from the Levant, but through trade with Levantine pastoralists.

== Bronze Age ==
The Bronze Age began on the Arabian Peninsula in the late fourth millennium BC. The transition into the Bronze Age profoundly altered Arabian societies, introducing metallurgy and the use of metals for all sorts of tasks in society. Around this time, sanctuaries first appeared, initiating a long tradition in the religious history of the region.

== Archaeological cultures ==
=== Sabir Culture ===
Sabir culture (also spelled Sabr) is a Bronze and Iron Age archaeological culture identified along the Red Sea coastal plain of Yemen and southern Saudi Arabia. Excavations at Ma'layba and Sabir and radiocarbon dating place the major phases of the Sabir culture between 1900–800 cal BC. The culture is characterized by sedentary settlements with evidence of hut-architecture, irrigation, and deposits of layered habitation. Archaeologists have defined the phases of occupation at the period based on pottery typologies. One form of architecture produced by the culture includes standing stones (known as menhirs) known from the Tihamah plain, associated with practices related to ritual or territorial marking.

Limited evidence exists for long-distance exchange between Sabir culture and the core kingdoms of South Arabia, suggesting that its social networks were local.

=== Umm al-Nar Culture ===
The Umm al-Nar culture (c. 2600–2000 BC) was a major Bronze Age culture in southeastern Arabia, particularly in the modern-day United Arab Emirates and northern Oman. This culture is known for its circular tombs made out of well-fitted dressed stone, often holding many individuals, as well as its large, tower-like settlement structures.

Economically, Umm al-Nar societies relied on agriculture, as well as copper production and trade. The main settlements exported copper to Mesopotamia and the Indus region, while smaller and rural settlements were primarily agricultural.

=== Wadi Suq Culture ===
The Wadi Suq culture (c. 2000–1300 BC) succeeded that of Umm al-Nar in southeastern Arabia and represents a transition in settlement, burial, and social practices. In contrast with the tombs of Umm al-Nar, which were large and circular, those of Wadi Suq are elongated and rectangular, and can be multi-chambered. Metallurgy also became more advanced in the area, with burial sites at Wadi Suq frequently containing bronze weapons such as daggers, swords, and spears, as well as soft-stone vessels with incised geometric designs.

== See also ==
- Archaeology of the Arabian Peninsula
- History of Saudi Arabia
- History of Yemen
- Pre-Islamic Arabia
- Ubaid period
