= Ed Dur =

Ancient city and archaeological site in the UAE

Ed-Dur
- ٱلدُّوْر (Arabic)
- Ed-Dour
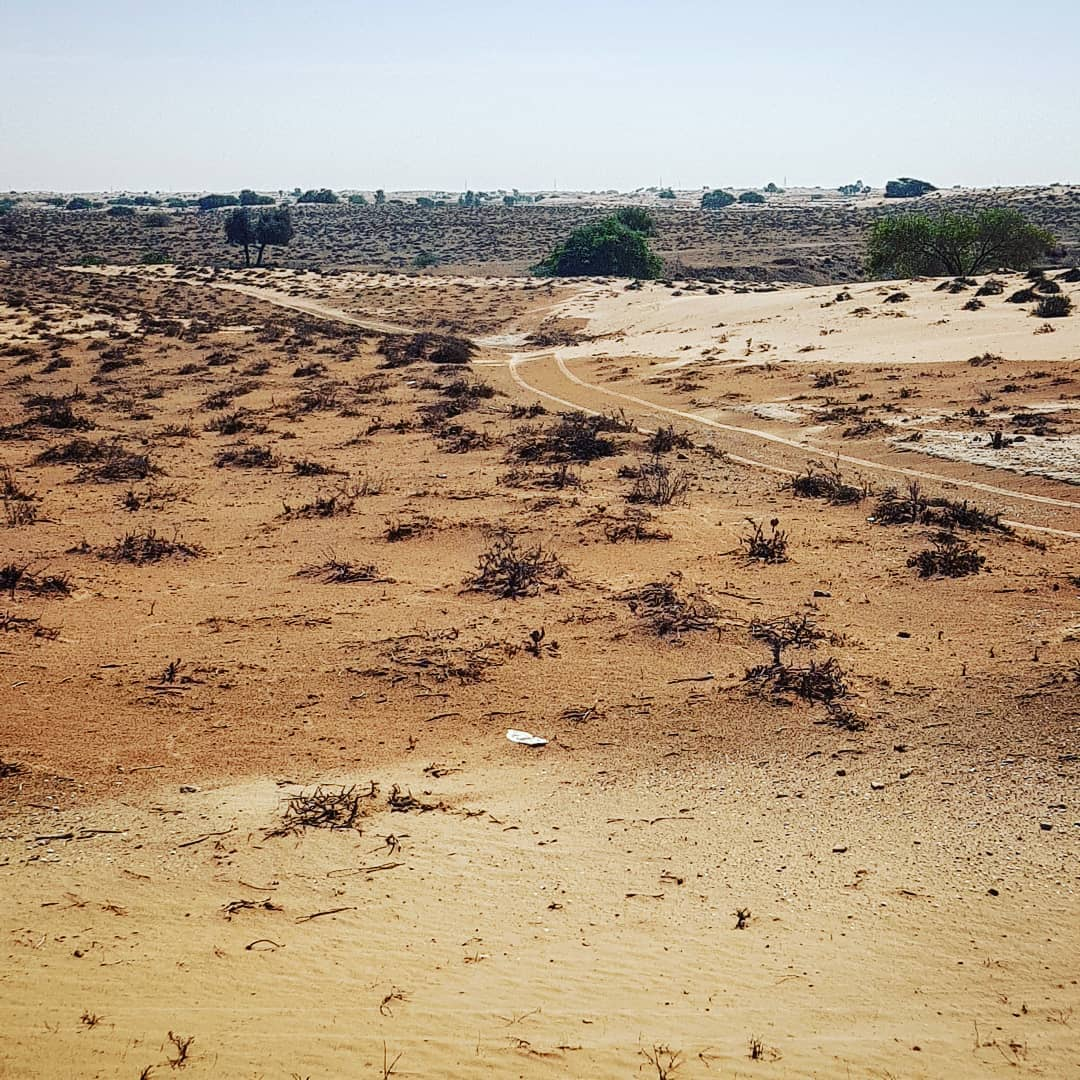
- The site of the Ancient Near Eastern City of Ed-Dur today. It thrived in the 1st century CE as a coastal port and city that traded across the ancient world.

- Location within United Arab Emirates
- 25°31′20″N 55°37′34″E
- Type: Settlement
- Location: Umm Al Quwain, the UAE
- Region: Eastern Arabia
- Part of: Umm Al-Quwain

Site notes
- Area: 5 km^{2} (1.9 sq mi)

Ed Dur, also known as Al Dour and Ad Dour (Arabic: ٱلدُّوْر, romanized: Ad-Dūr, lit. 'The Houses') is an ancient Near Eastern city, today located in Umm Al Quwain, United Arab Emirates. One of the largest archaeological sites in the emirates, comprising an area of some 5 km^{2} (1.9 sq mi), the coastal settlement overlooks Al Beidha Lake. One of the most important archaeological finds in the UAE, and closely associated with the inland trading centre of Mleiha, Ed Dur has been dubbed "one of the most significant lost cities of Arabia".

== Discovery ==
Ed Dur was first discovered by an Iraqi archaeological team in 1973 and dug in 1974, but formal archaeological exploration only commenced in 1989. Subsequent digs have unearthed evidence of human habitation spanning the Ubeid period, Stone Age, Bronze Age, Iron Age, and pre-Islamic period. During the latter period, the settlement appears to have been at its most prosperous and the hills of the area were entirely covered with dozens of buildings, many more areesh or palm-frond buildings and thousands of stone-built tombs. Some 500 of these tombs have been excavated, with grave goods discovered including drinking sets, Roman glass, weaponry, pottery, jewelry and ivory objects. It is thought some 20,000 tombs are on the site in all. In the digs carried out between 1989 and 1995 alone, over 1400 found objects were recorded and no fewer than 13,000 diagnostic sherds. During later work at Ed Dur at the end of March 2019, fifteen tombs, bronze statues, settlement remains, jewellery, and pottery (dating back to the 1st century) CE were unearthed at the site.

Ed Dur was—in its prime—the largest (and thought to be the only) coastal port of significance in the southern Gulf. Situated some 120 km from the Straits of Hormuz, occupation of the site from the Neolithic through to the Iron Age was followed by a period of desertion. From the 3rd to 1st century BCE, northeast Arabian trade dominated Ed Dur, giving way to southeastern Arabian traders. This period of trade saw Ed Dur emerge as a major port.

Of the many discoveries made at Ed Dur, the use of alabaster window panes is significant, the first recorded such use in the Arabian Peninsula. Ceramic finds at the site are mostly glazed ware, likely of Parthian origin and imported from southern Mesopotamia or southwestern Iran. The more elaborate burials at Ed Dur are similar to those found at Assur in Upper Mesopotamia, which are Parthian. Black-on-orange painted 'Namord ware' is indicative of trading links across the Strait of Hormuz to Persia and Baluchistan, while Indian red polished ware also points to links east.

== Graeco-Roman links ==
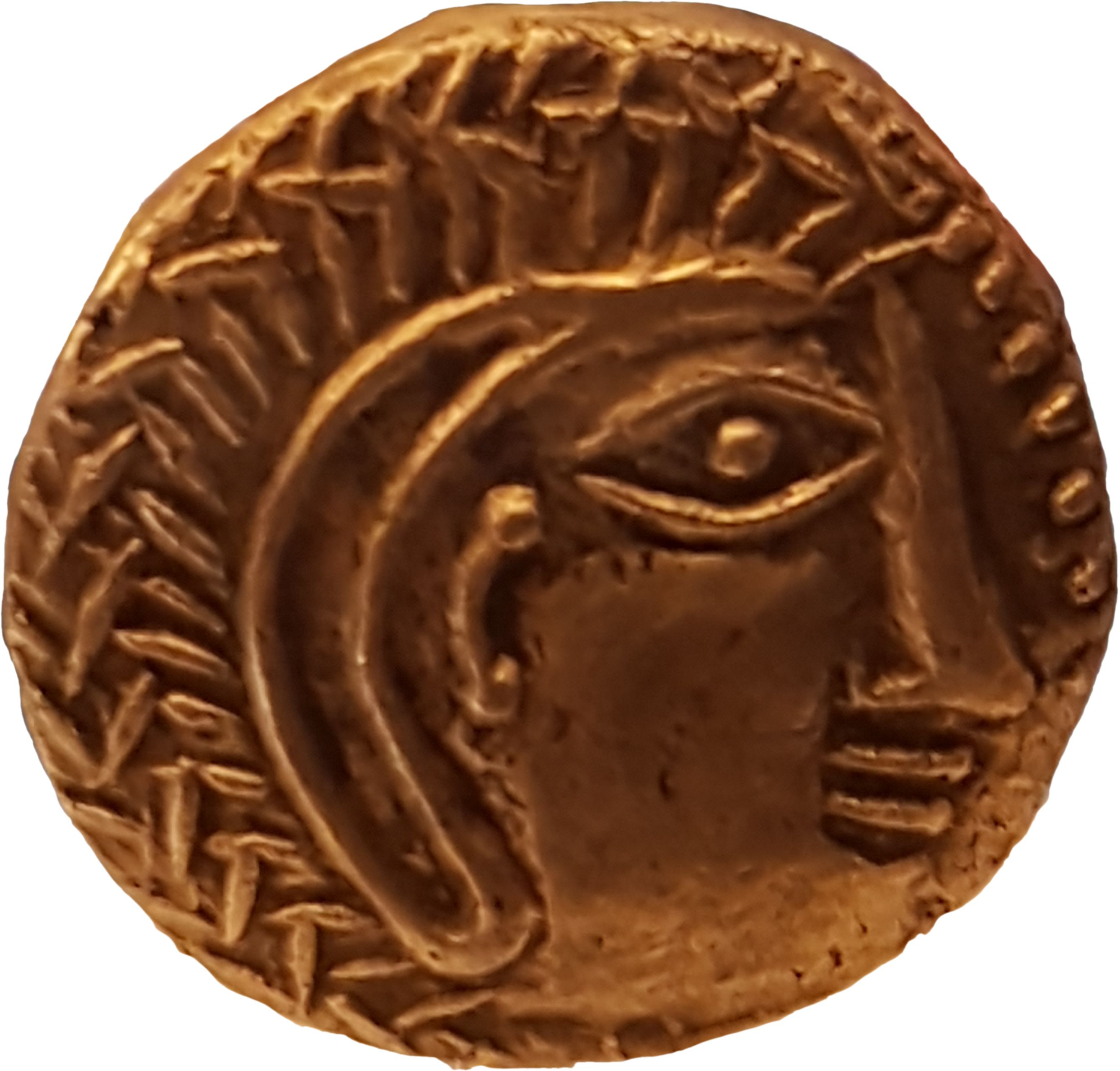
A Tetra Drachma of the type found in large quantities at Ed-Dur. Finds of coin moulds in Mleiha matching these coins show they were minted there, between 100 and 200 CE.

It is thought that Ed Dur is the site of Omana, mentioned by both Pliny and Strabo as an important town in the Lower Gulf. The city is referred to in the anonymous Periplus of the Erythraean Sea, a documentation of trade between Alexandria and India, and the Periplus indicates that Omana was the most important port in the Gulf during the first century CE and was linked with the port of Apologos (al-Ubulla) at the head of the Gulf, which has been linked to Basra. This trade down the Gulf, via camel trains inland from the Gulf to Syria, would explain the richness of finds of Roman materials at Ed Dur. Contemporary Greek manuscripts have given the exports from Ed Dur as 'pearls, purple dye, clothing, wine, gold and slaves, and a great quantity of dates'.

Continuing evidence of millennia of trade between southeastern Arabia and the various civilizations of Mesopotamia is found at Ed Dur, with Characene coins from the reign of Attambelos III to VI, as well as a small number of Nabatean coins from the reign of Aretas IV found at the site. Aretas ruled from approximately 9 BCE to 40CE.

The site has been associated with the inland historical development of Mileiha in the Emirate of Sharjah, with which it is thought to have had strong ties. Similarities in burial rituals (of laying animals to rest with their owners) and vessels, decorations and small bronze snake figures have also been unearthed. Camels buried with their heads reversed are a common feature of both the animal burials at the coastal city of Ed Dur and Mleiha inland.

Ed Dur had a rich trading past, with artefacts found at the site showing links both with Mesopotamia and India. Macedonian style coinage unearthed at Ed Dur dates back to Alexander the Great, while hundreds of coins have been found featuring a head of Heracles and a seated Zeus on the obverse, and bearing the name of Abi'el in Aramaic. These coins match coin moulds found at Mleiha, and are in fact unique to the two sites. Their dating to 100 AD, when Ed Dur was in its prime, is complicated by similar coins found in Bahrain in a hoard dated to 200 BC. It is thought that Abi'el lived on in coinage much as Alexander did on coins minted centuries after his death. The Abi'el coins found at Ed Dur comprise some 70% of the total hoard there. Attesting to the regional trade through Ed Dur, coins from Roman (Augustus and Tiberius), Eastern Mediterranean (Nabataean, Gaza), southern Mesopotamian (Characene), South Arabian (Hadramawt), Persian (Parthian and Persis), and Indian sources were found.

=== Fort ===
First unearthed by the Iraqi archaeological team in 1973, the fort at Ed Dur was undoubtedly the focus of political power. Four walls some 20 metres (66 feet) in length connect four towers, each some 4 metres (13 feet) in diameter. The fort was constructed mainly from beach rock. South of the fort is the Sun Temple.

== Sun Temple ==
One of the reasons for Ed Dur's importance is the discovery of a temple to the Sun God Shams/Shamash, which has been compared to the Great Temple of Hetra in Iraq, also known as the "Temple of the Sun", dating back to the same period. The temple was originally by a Belgian expedition in 1987, but has been damaged since by erosion. In early 2016, a project was undertaken to restore the temple to its 1980s state. A rectangular building, its main gate is located to the east and is preceded by columns mounted with Corinthian capitals. Two gates within the temple lead respectively to the main building and its courtyard. The temple differs from the Hetra Temple in the simplicity of its architecture and the geometric decorations to its external plaster. A pair of stone eagles, uncovered during an Emirati dig in 2015, are thought to have originally decorated the temple entrance. A simple stone altar that was probably used for offering or sacrifice was found inside the temple.

The exterior walls of the temple are decorated in a style linked with that of the late-Iron Age eastern Mediterranean, consisting of alternating squares and rectangles with projecting panels; the pattern is also featured on the outside walls of a 1st-century temple in the ancient city of Hermopolis in Egypt (as well as in Pompeii) and is viewed as relatively common in the ancient world of that period.

A rectangular basin, located in the north-east corner of the building, sits on a broad base with a 8-line inscription in Aramaic, of which only a sole word can now be deciphered, "Shamash", a reference to Shams, or the Sun deity. A fire pit, some 2.7 m (8.9 ft) across and 1 m (3.3 ft) deep, has led to speculation of the use of fire in religious ritual. While Aramaic was in common usage in eastern Arabia from the 3rd/2nd century BCE onwards, Shamash was the major deity of the Parthian Arab city of Hatra, today located in present-day eastern Nineveh Governorate in northern Iraq. Although the site at Hatra was extensively damaged by the Islamic State of Iraq and the Levant, which occupied the area in mid-2014, damage to the site was less than at other Iraqi archaeological sites.

The temple was to have been the subject of a programme of conservation undertaken in 2016 by the Umm Al Quwain Department of Tourism and Antiquities, in collaboration with the Ministry of Culture and Knowledge Development and the regional office of the UN-affiliated International Centre for the Study of the Preservation and Restoration of Cultural Property, but as of 2019, the temple building was still open to the elements and deteriorating as a consequence.

Areal Survey of Ed-dur Umm al Quwain Sun Temple archaeological site 2021, March

== See also ==
- List of ancient settlements in the UAE
- Archaeology of the United Arab Emirates
- History of the United Arab Emirates
- Mleiha Archaeological Centre
