= Mleiha Archaeological Centre =

Archaeological centre in the UAE

Coordinates: 25°7′34.95″N 55°51′27.17″E

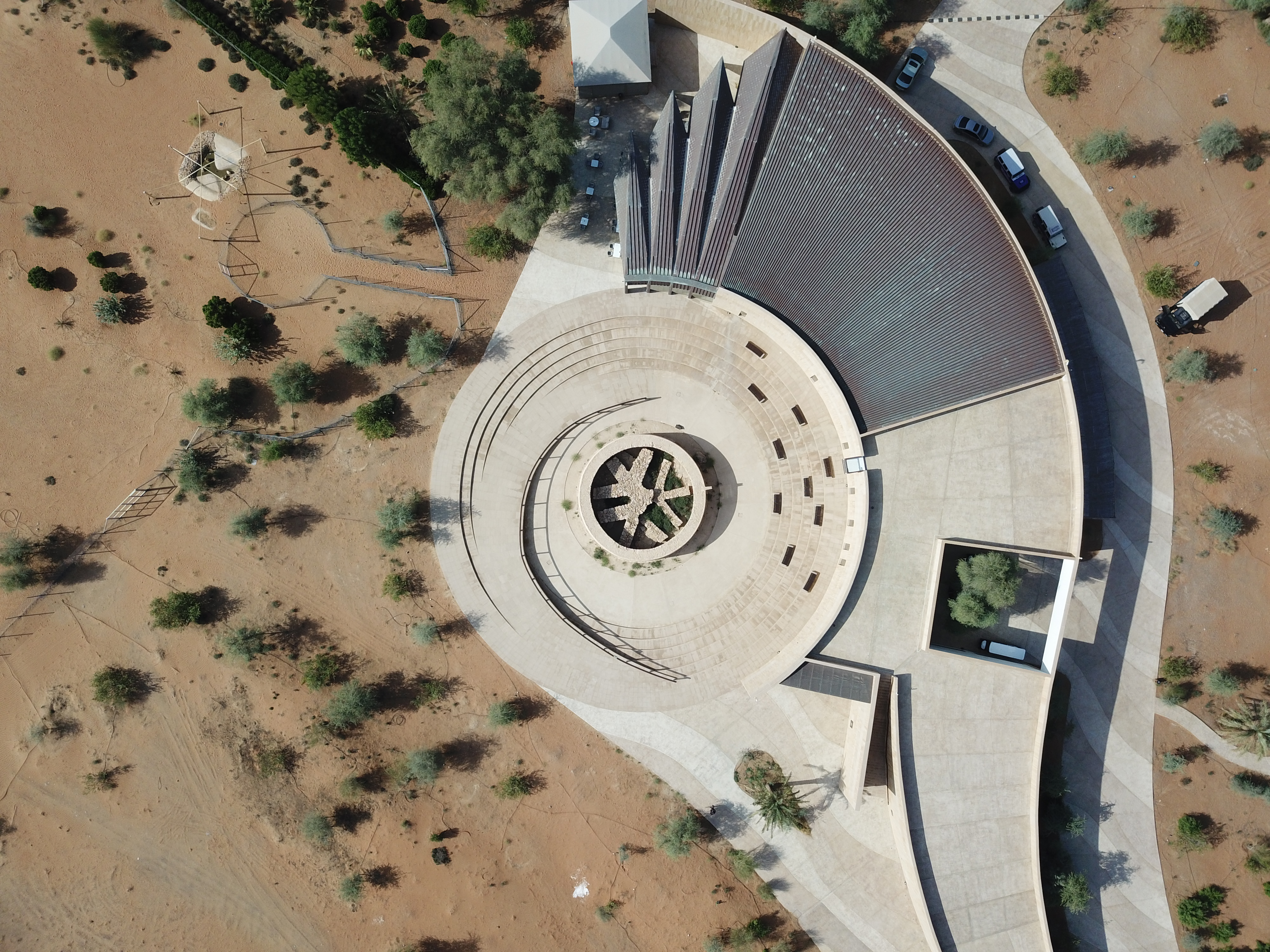
The Mleiha Archaeological Centre is constructed around a 4,500 year old Umm Al Nar era Tomb

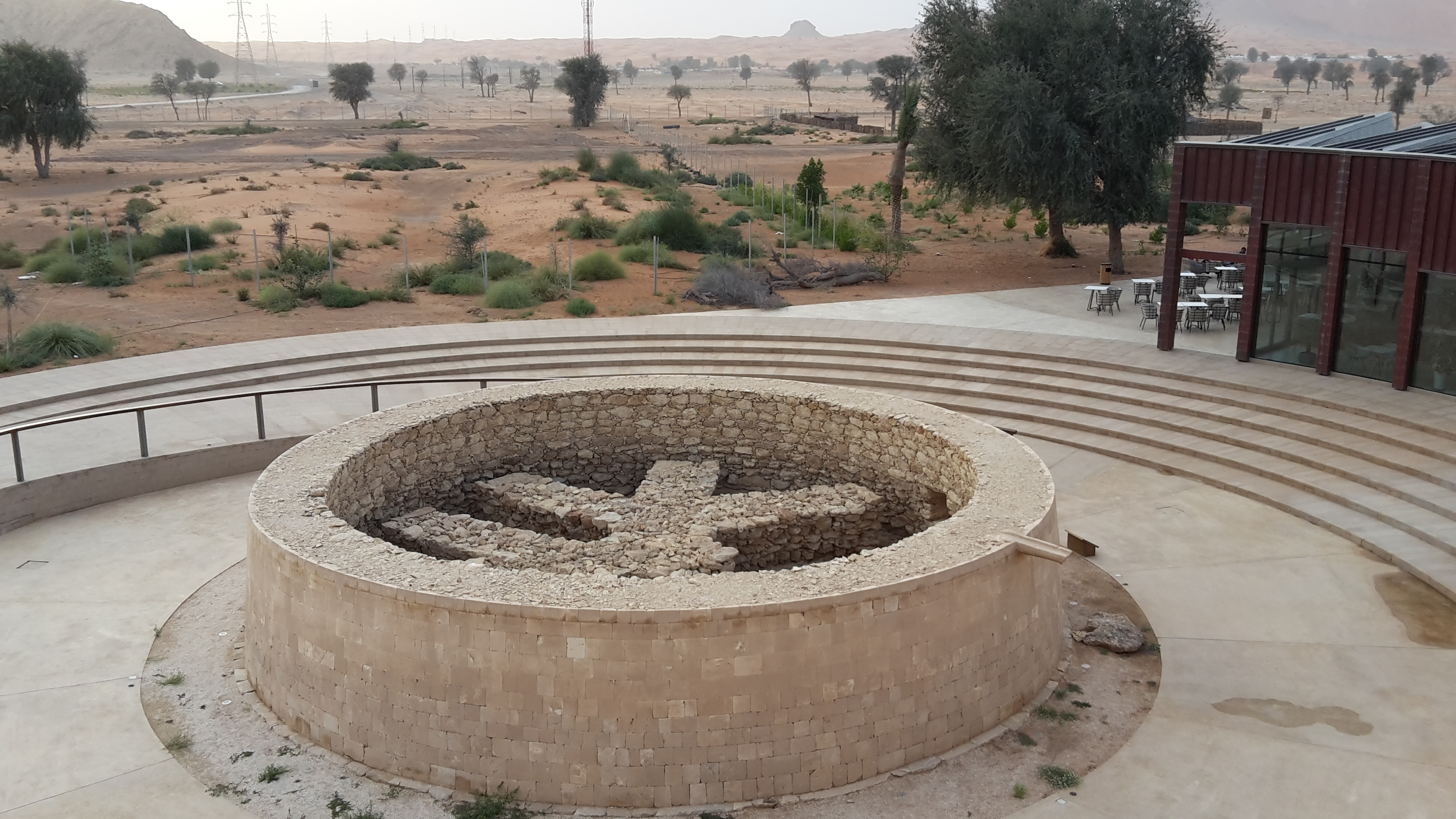
Mleiha Bronze Age Umm Al Nar tomb near the Mleiha Archaeological Centre, built around 2,300 BCE and used until 2,100 BCE.

Mleiha Archaeological Centre is a visitor centre and exhibition based around the history and archaeology of the areas surrounding the village of Mileiha in the Emirate of Sharjah, in the United Arab Emirates.

It sits at the centre of the Paleolandscape of Faya, designated a UNESCO World Heritage Site in 2025.

Built around a preserved Umm Al Nar era tomb, the Centre details the excavations and discoveries made over the past 40 years at Mleiha and surrounding areas (including Al Thuqeibah, Jebel Faya, Al Faya, Al Madam and Jebel Al-Buhais), particularly the important Faya North East find, which provides evidence that anatomically modern humans were in the Mleiha area between 130,000 and 120,000 years ago.

The Faya find, in particular, points to a virile southern dispersal route in the spread of humanity from Africa across the Red Sea to the Persian Gulf region, and onward to populate the world through Iran, India, Europe and Asia.

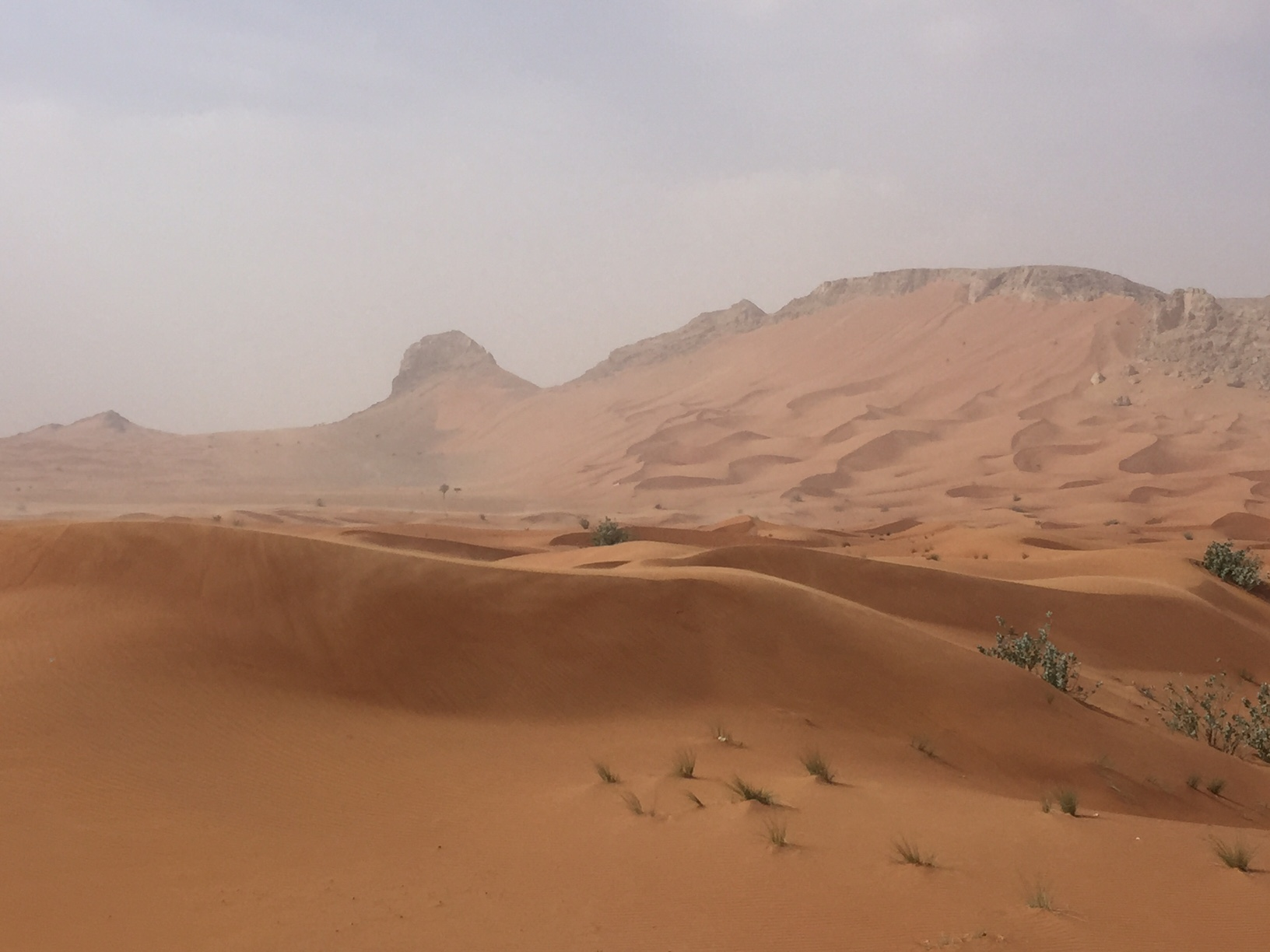
Fossil Rock, or Jebel Mleiha, overlooks the Mleiha Archaeological Centre, which offers tours to the popular destination.

The centre was opened on 24 January 2016 by the Ruler of Sharjah, Sheikh Sultan Bin Muhammad Al Qasimi. The multi-phase eco-tourism development is intended in future to comprise accommodation, a campsite and an astronomical observatory, with a total investment of some UAE Dhs 250 million. It will also include the development of a 450 km desert park. The centre was developed by the Sharjah Investment and Development Authority (Shurooq).

== Visitor facilities and lodge ==
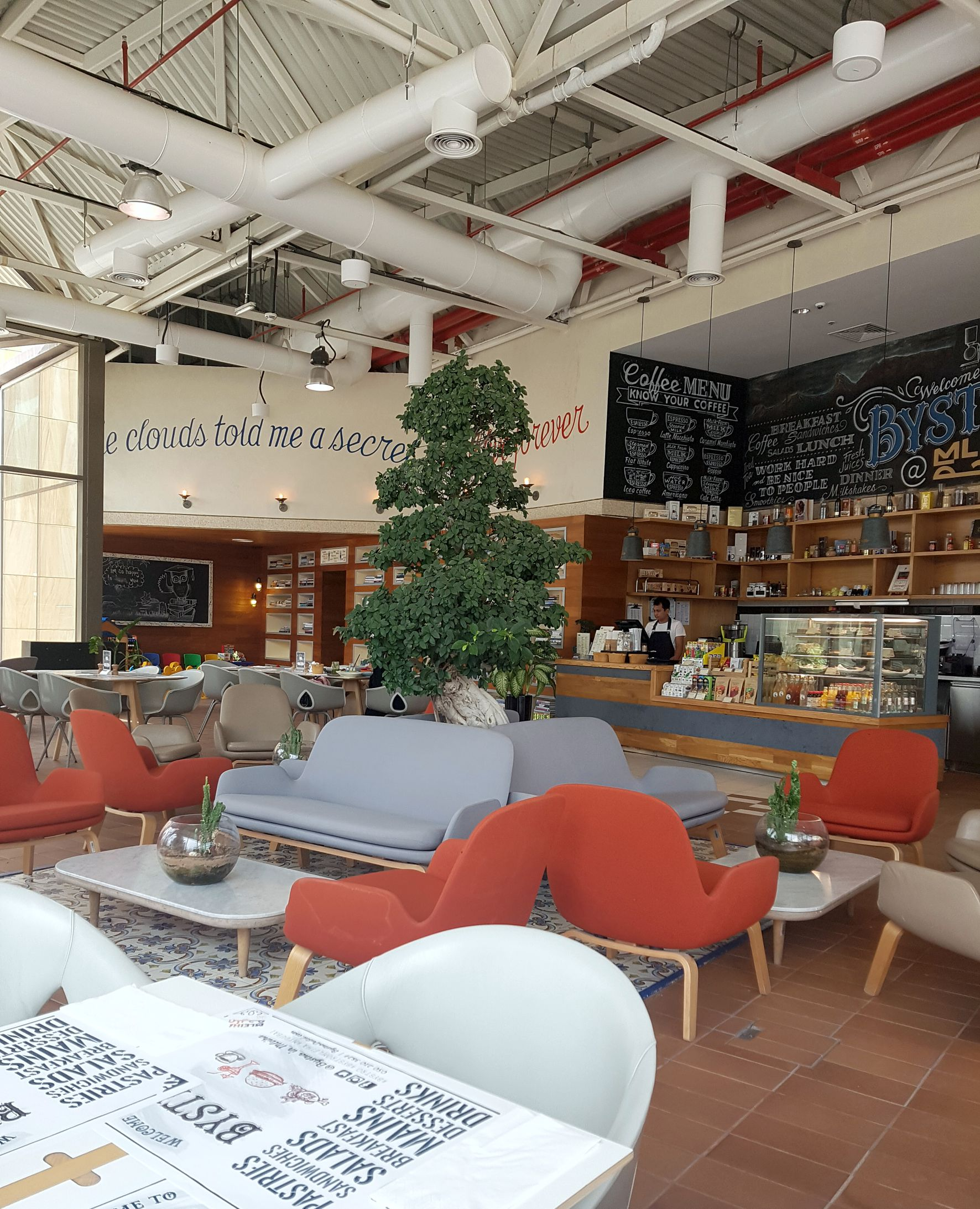
The Bystro Café at the Mleiha Archaeological Centre

Visitor facilities at the archaeological centre include a café and a range of guided excursions.

Tours are offered from the Centre to nearby attractions, including the popular 'Fossil Rock', or Jebel Mleiha. A range of horse-riding activities target beginners as well as advanced riders. The centre has an education outreach program and also offers discovery packages for families, as well as hosting groups and corporate events.

Currently under development at the centre site, the Al Faya Lodge is a small collection of luxury hotel rooms with a café, pool and spa, based around outbuildings first constructed in the 1960s. The Lodge forms part of 'The Sharjah Collection', a range of boutique hospitality locations managed by Mantis Hotels, a joint venture between Shurooq and Mantis Hospitality.

One of a number of innovations being deployed to maintain the eco-tourism aspect of the centre is 'spray on roads'.

The centre is open to the public weekdays from 9am-7pm and weekends (Thursday, Friday) from 9am-9pm.

== See also ==
- List of Ancient Settlements in the UAE
- Archaeology of the United Arab Emirates
- Iron Age in the United Arab Emirates
