= Erock =

Erock may refer to:

== Bicycling ==
- Elephant Rock Ride, an annual bicycling event in Castle Rock, Colorado
- ErokIT, a 2008 motorised bicycle

== People ==
- Eric Calderone (also known as "Erock"), American YouTuber and shred guitarist
- Eric Friedman (also known as "Erock"), American heavy metal and rock musician
