= Arabian Archaeology and Epigraphy =

Journal

- Discipline: Archaeology, Epigraphy, and History
- Language: English, French, German
- Edited by: Rémy Crassard, Jérémie Schiettecatte, Peter Stein

Publication details
- History: 1990–present
- Publisher: Wiley-Blackwell
- Frequency: Biannual
- Open access: Hybrid
- Impact factor: 0.7 (2023)

Standard abbreviations
- ISO 4: Arab. Archaeol. Epigr.

Indexing
- ISSN: 0905-7196 (print); 1600-0471 (web)
- LCCN: 94640408
- OCLC no.: 22978181

Links
- Journal homepage

Arabian Archaeology and Epigraphy or AAE is a scholarly journal for articles relating to the archaeology of the Arabian Peninsula.

== Aims and scope ==
In recent years, the Arabian peninsula has emerged as one of the major new frontiers of archaeological research in the Old World. Arabian Archaeology and Epigraphy is a forum for the publication of studies in the archaeology, epigraphy, numismatics, and early history of Bahrain, Kuwait, Oman, Qatar, Saudi Arabia, the United Arab Emirates, and Yemen.

Articles and short communications in English, French, and German are published, and may treat with matters ranging from prehistory to the Islamic era. Also, studies touching on different parts of the region and their relations with neighbouring areas such as Africa, the Levant, Mesopotamia, Iran, and the Indus Valley are invited. Studies pertaining more directly to these areas, however, are considered only if the link to the Arabian peninsula is clear and of central importance.

Contributions concerned with inscriptions from the Arabian peninsula, whether recorded in the field or housed in public and private collections around the world, are also welcomed.

== Publication details ==
The journal was founded in 1990 and is published bi-annually in May and November. A different photograph features on the journal cover each year. The journal was founded by Daniel T. Potts, editor-in-chief of the journal until 2015. The current editors are Rémy Crassard, Jérémie Schiettecatte, and Peter Stein.

== Indexing ==
The journal is indexed and abstracted in the following databases:

- Academic Search Ultimate
- Anthropological Literature
- Arab World Research Source: Al Masdar
- Art & Architecture Source
- Art, Design & Architecture Collection
- Arts and Humanities Citation Index
- Arts Premium Collection
- GEOBASE
- Index Islamicus
- Linguistic Bibliography
- Scopus

According to the Journal Citation Reports, the journal has a 2023 impact factor of 0.7.
