= Elephant Rock (Saudi Arabia) =

Rock formation in Saudi Arabia

Elephant Rock جبل الفيل
- Natural rock formation
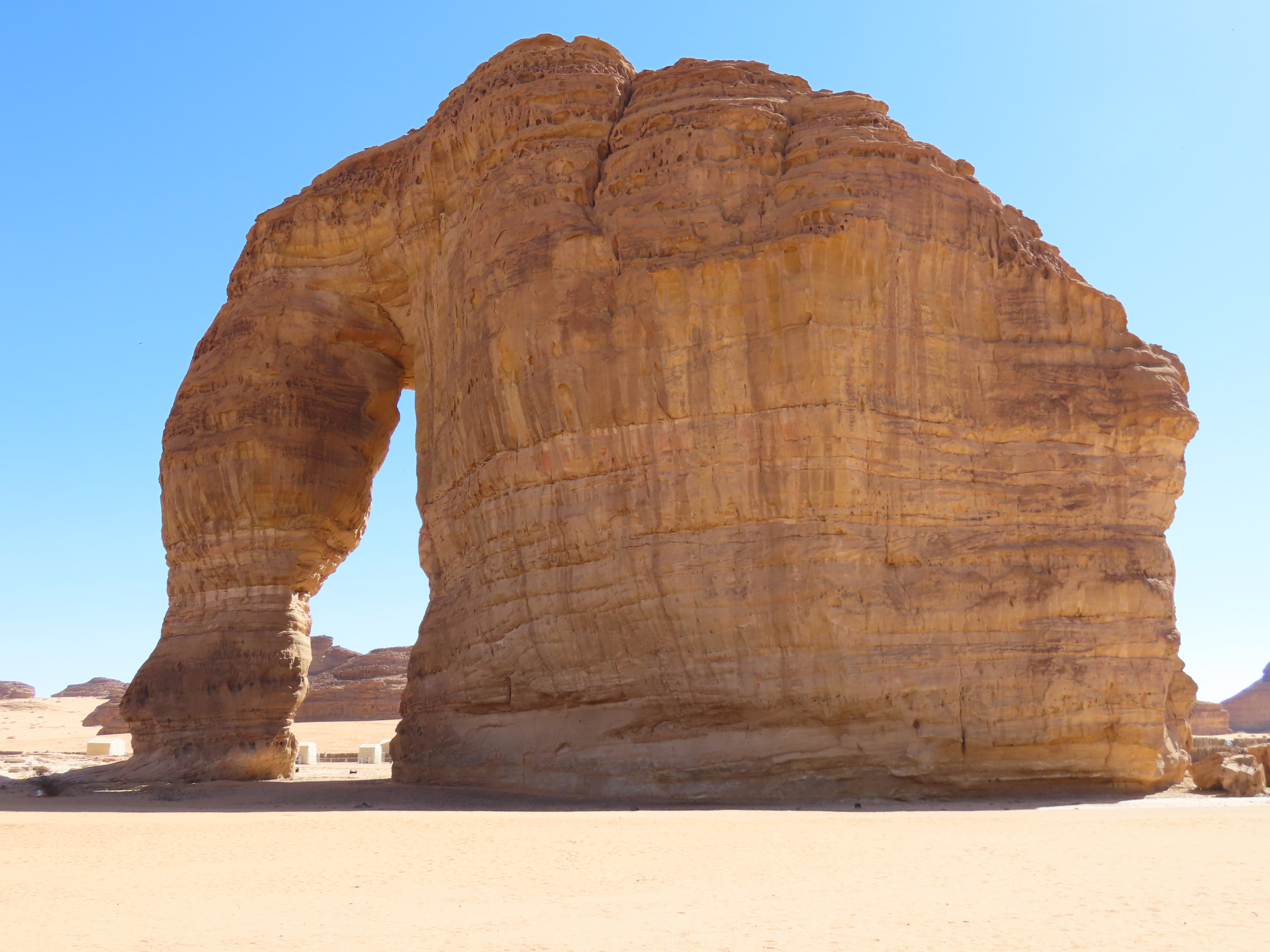
- Jabal Al-Fil

- Location in Saudi Arabia
- Coordinates: 26.6892°N 37.9816°E
- Location: Al-Ula, Saudi Arabia
- Formed by: Erosion by rain, wind and sand
- Geology: Sandstone

Dimensions
  - Height: 52 m (171 ft)

The Elephant Rock (Arabic: جبل الفيل, romanized: Jabal AlFil) is a natural rock formation in Al-Ula, Northwestern Saudi Arabia. Elephant Rock measures 52 meters (170 ft) at its highest point. It is primarily formed of sandstone that has been eroded over millions of years by rain, wind and sand to take on the shape of an elephant. The surrounding sandstones of Al-Ula formed around 540-485 million years ago and were uplifted around 30 million years ago as the Red Sea began to open.

== See also ==
- Archaeology of the Arabian Peninsula
- Elephant Rock - a list of other rocks/formations that resemble elephants
