= Arabian Gulf Digital Archive =

National archives of the United Arab Emirates

Agency overview
- Formed: 2019
- Jurisdiction: National Archives of the United Arab Emirates
- Headquarters: Abu Dhabi
- Website: www.agda.ae/en

The Arabian Gulf Digital Archive (AGDA) is the bilingual, free and open-access online national archive of the United Arab Emirates which was launched in 2019. It offers digitized documents about the events concerning the Gulf countries from the 1820s.

== History and coverage ==
The AGDA was created in 2019 as a result of the combination of the archives of the United Arab Emirates and the United Kingdom. The related agreement was signed by the parties in 2017. It is part of the National Archives of the United Arab Emirates and contains videos, photographs and documents in Arabic and English. The latter also includes letters, memos, transcripts, and official correspondence some of which are those of the oil companies which involved in the oil exploration activities in the region. The materials are constructed through the optical character recognition and can be accessed via Internet and mobile devices.

The archive contains nearly more than a quarter of a million documents and photographs covering the events related to the region from the 1820s to the 2000s. Some of them are the papers produced by the British Foreign Office.
