= Elephant Rock, Hartlepool =

Former rock formation in England

Coordinates: 54.700°N 1.177°W

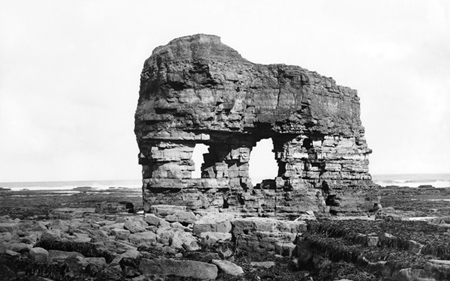
The Francis Frith photo

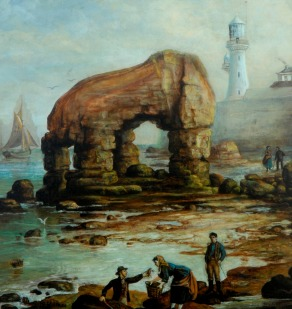
The Holmes painting

Elephant Rock was a rock formation at Hartlepool, England, shaped like an elephant which only existed for a few decades, being washed away by a storm in 1891.

It was created partially as a result of limestone quarrying of the sea cliff. A popular tourist attraction, it was painted in 1850 by J.S. Holmes and photographed by a team working for Francis Frith in 1886.
