= Jebel Faya =

Hill and archaeological site in the UAE

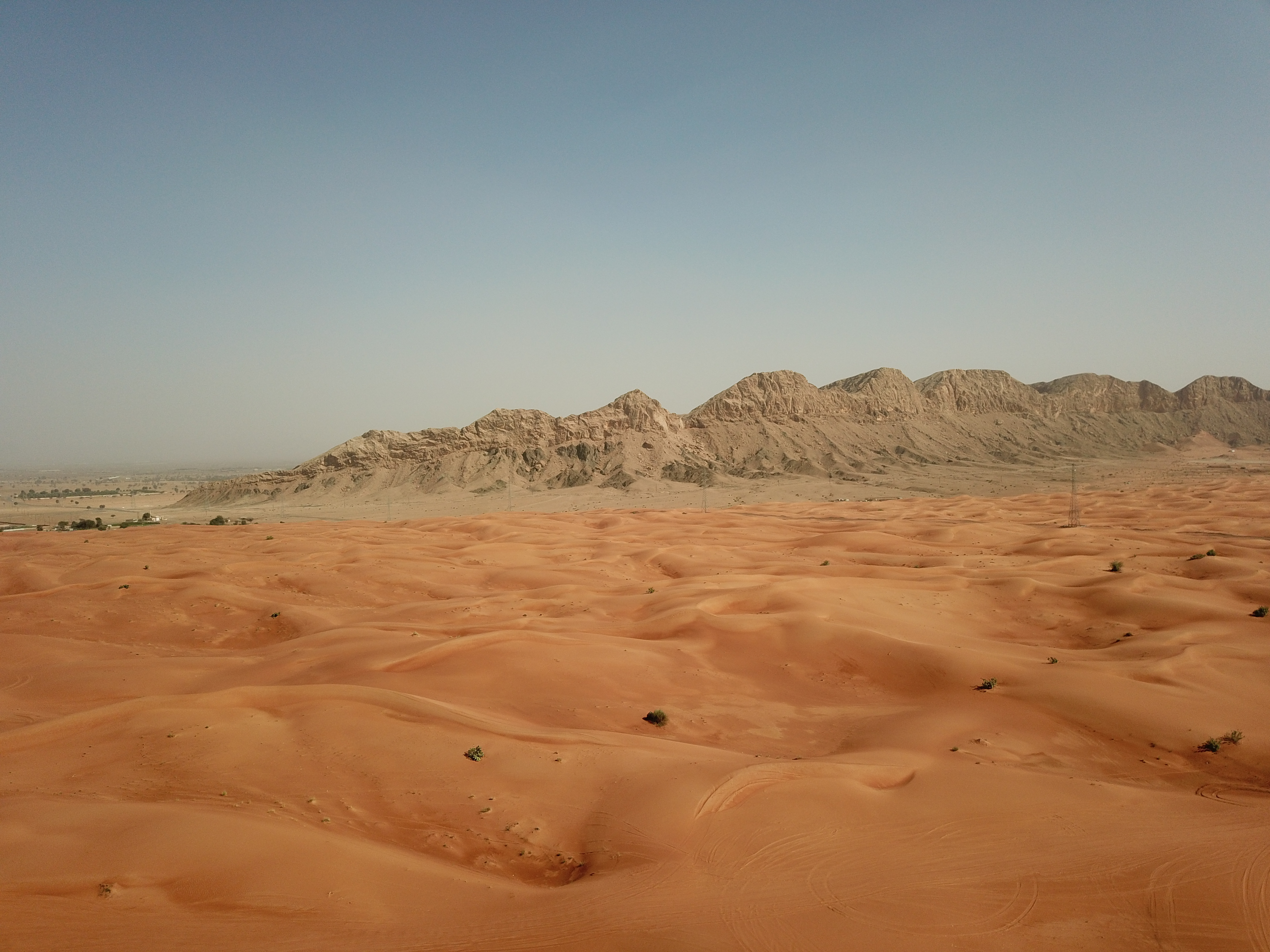
- Jebel Faya, as seen from the desert East of the range

Highest point
- Elevation: 412 m (1,352 ft)
- Coordinates: 25°07′08″N 55°50′49″E

Naming
- Language of name: Arabic

Geography
- Location within United Arab Emirates Location within Middle East Location within Asia
- Location: Al Faya, Sharjah, United Arab Emirates
- Parent range: Al Hajar Mountains

UNESCO World Heritage Site
- Official name: Faya Palaeolandscape
- Criteria: Cultural: (iii)(iv)
- Reference: 1735
- Inscription: 2025 (47th Session)

Jebel Faya (Arabic: جَبَل ٱلْفَايَة, romanized: Jabal Al-Fāyah) is a limestone ridge near Mleiha in the central region of the Emirate of Sharjah, United Arab Emirates. It forms part of the Faya Range, a group of limestone outcrops that also includes Jebel Mleiha, Jebel Aqabah, Jebel Emailah and Jebel Buhais.

The area contains archaeological sites documenting human occupation from the Middle Palaeolithic to the Neolithic. Among them is FAY-NE1, a rock shelter at the northeastern end of Jebel Faya, where excavations have revealed stone-tool assemblages dating back approximately 210,000 years.

The wider Faya Palaeolandscape, which includes archaeological and palaeoenvironmental evidence spanning approximately 210,000 to 6,000 years ago, was inscribed on the UNESCO World Heritage List in 2025 under criteria (iii) and (iv).

== Geography and palaeoenvironment ==
=== Location and landscape ===
Jebel Faya is a limestone mountain outlier in Al Faya, in the Central Region of the Emirate of Sharjah, measuring about 10 km (6.2 mi) in length and about 2 km (1.2 mi) in width. The archaeological site itself is called FAY-NE1, a rock shelter located at the northeastern endpoint of Jebel Faya. The area lies approximately 60 km from both the Arabian Gulf to the west and the Gulf of Oman to the east.

Jebel Faya forms part of the Faya Range, a north–south-oriented limestone ridge along the western side of the inland plain. The range separates the dune fields of the Rub' al-Khali to the west from the Mleiha–Madam Plain to the east, with the Hajar Mountains further east.

=== Palaeoenvironment and hydrology ===
The landscape around Jebel Faya includes gravel plains, sand dunes, wadis and deposits associated with former fluvial and lacustrine environments. The Hajar Mountains to the east form an important source of surface and underground drainage towards the inland plain. Palaeoenvironmental studies suggest that the interaction of these features created locally favourable conditions for human occupation during periods of increased rainfall.

Palaeolithic occupations at Jebel Faya have been linked to humid periods in southern Arabia, when increased freshwater availability and vegetation cover may have supported human subsistence. Sediment analyses at FAY-NE1 identified differences between archaeological and non-archaeological layers: Some assemblages showed evidence of vegetation, whereas layers without archaeological deposits showed evidence of desiccation. These findings suggest a relationship between changes in local environmental conditions and phases of human occupation.

Regional studies of alluvial fan records and former lake deposits have identified repeated humid periods in southern Arabia. These periods may have provided multiple opportunities for human movement and dispersal across the region, although the relationship between particular climatic episodes and human dispersal remains a subject of research.

== Archaeology ==
Archaeologists have excavated several trenches at the Jebel Faya, specifically FAY-NE1, covering an area of more than 150 m^{2} (1,600 sq ft). The site contains a stratified archaeological sequence approximately 5 m (16 ft) deep, with evidence of occupation during the Bronze and Iron Ages and the Palaeolithic. Excavations revealed two stratigraphically connected sequences: the Terrace Sequence, comprising assemblages A–D, and the Faya Shelter Sequence, comprising archaeological horizons AH II–VII beneath the rock shelter.

Site FAY-NE1 at Jebel Faya was first discovered and test-excavated by a French team during fieldwork in Sharjah in the 1980s. The work was directed by Rémy Boucharlat of the French National Centre for Scientific Research (CNRS) and established the presence of stratified prehistoric material at the site. Research into the Palaeolithic history of Jebel Faya has been conducted since 2003 as part of a joint project between the Sharjah Archaeology Authority and the University of Tübingen, a collaboration established in 1995. The Tübingen–Sharjah project began systematic, large-scale excavations at FAY-NE1 in 2003. In addition to later prehistoric material, the teams uncovered the first stratified Palaeolithic deposits in 2006. Excavations continued until 2017, documenting the archaeological sequence and providing further information about the site's environmental and geological context.

The investigations documented stone-tool assemblages attributed to the Middle and Late Palaeolithic, indicating human occupation of the area between approximately 210,000 and 10,300 years ago.

=== Middle Palaeolithic ===
The principal Middle Palaeolithic site at Jebel Faya is FAY-NE1, a rock shelter at the northern end of the ridge. Excavations revealed two connected archaeological sequences: one on the terrace in front of the shelter, containing assemblages A–D, and another beneath the shelter, known as the Faya Shelter Sequence, comprising archaeological horizons AH II–VII.

The earliest evidence of human occupation at FAY-NE1 dates to approximately 210,000 years ago, based on the dating of Assemblage D. Further occupation phases have been identified at approximately 170,000 years ago and between 120,000 and 130,000 years ago. The stone-tool assemblages include prepared-core technologies, such as the Levallois method, as well as bifacial tools. Research published in 2025 dated AH II, the youngest Middle Palaeolithic layer in the shelter sequence, to approximately 80,000 years ago. Its assemblage is characterised by elongated flakes and blades produced mainly through bidirectional reduction methods. The study also revised the earlier chronological interpretation of this layer, which had been based on its stratigraphic relationship with the terrace assemblages.

=== Upper and Late Palaeolithic ===
Excavations at FAY-NE1 revealed evidence of several Middle Palaeolithic occupation phases: Upper Paleolithic and Late Paleolithic phases. The earliest, represented by Assemblage D, dates to approximately 210,000 years ago. Further phases are recorded at around 170,000 years ago and between 120,000 and 130,000 years ago. The stone tools include prepared-core technologies, particularly the Levallois method. Research published in 2025 dated the youngest Middle Palaeolithic horizon in the rock shelter (AH II) to approximately 80,000 years ago.

=== Neolithic ===
Neolithic activity is represented at sites including FAY-NE10 and FAY-NE15. FAY-NE15 is a settlement and burial site dated to approximately 6,800–6,300 years ago. Its excavated remains include primary and secondary burials, personal ornaments, marine shells and objects made from dugong ivory. FAY-NE10 also preserves evidence of later prehistoric activity, including stone tools, animal remains and shell ornaments.

== Findings ==
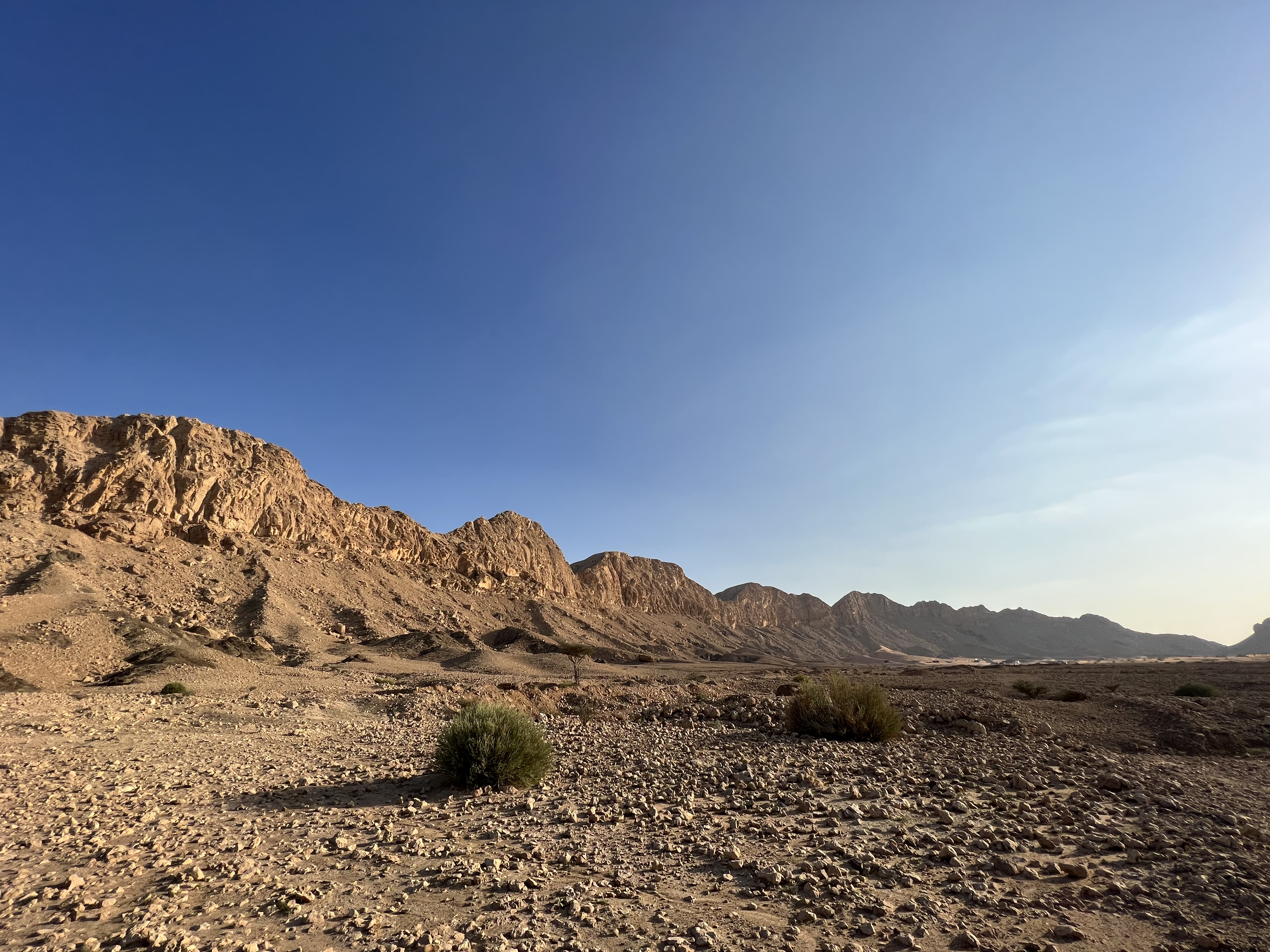
Jebel Faya

=== Deposits ===
Researchers defined two different archaeological sequences, which, however, can stratigraphically be linked. There is a so-called Terrace Sequence mostly excavated in front of the rock shelter, where the Palaeolithic layers are called A-D. The second sequence is called Faya Shelter Sequence and describes the stratigraphy below the current rock shelter using the term archaeological horizon (AH) for archaeological layer. The Shelter Sequence comprised six plaeolithic AHs (II-VII) below the uppermost mixed layer AH I. These layers yielded more than 6,000 stone artifacts. Additionally, the terrace sequence in front of the rock shelter at FAY-NE 1 contains about 28,000 stone artifacts.

Most of the recovered Paleolithic layers from FAY-NE1 were dated using single-grain optically stimulated luminescence (OSL), while the Late Palaeolithic layer was dated using radiocarbon ages from marine shell. The horizons are as follows, from top to bottom including the layers from both sequences and their stratigraphic correlation:

==== AH I ====
Uppermost layer of the Shelter sequence with mixed cultural material from multiple later prehistoric periods.

==== AH II ====
Dated to approximately 80,000 years ago. The recovered assemblage shows a focus on the production of elongated tools and blades using typical Middle Paleolithic technologies including Levallois.

==== AH III ====
This relatively small assemblage underlies AH II and consists of relatively large cores, flakes and tools.

==== Assemblage A / AH IV ====
Has previously been dated to approximately 40,000 years ago, but has recently revised to an age between 120,000 and 90,000 years ago. Recovered tools include a range of different types of sidescrapers and denticulates.

==== Assemblage B / AH V ====
Dated to approximately 120,000 years. Recovered tools resemble those of Assemblage A.

==== Assemblage C / AH VI ====
Dated to approximately 125,000 years ago. Recovered tools include small hand axes, foliates, end scrapers and sidescrapers, and denticulates. Evidence of the Levallois production technique is unique to Assemblage C.

Stone tools are thought to have been associated with Homo sapiens living in Africa at that time, and this shows that modern sapiens may have expanded Africa more quickly than thought.

==== AH VII ====
Has been dated to approximately 170,000 years ago. Recovered tools share typological and technological similarities with Assemblage C/AH VI.

==== Assemblage D ====
Has been dated to approximately 210,000 years ago. Due to small number of finds, typological characterisation of the tools from Assemblage D is currently not available.

Paleolithic Assemblage E is also present, but has not been discussed in detail due to a small number of finds.

==== Late Palaeolithic levels ====
The layer directly overlying the Paleolithic sequence has previously been attributed to the Neolithic period. This layer contains so-called Faya points (arrowheads) and shell fragments, dated to about 9,500 years BP. Hans-Peter Uerpmann and his colleagues attribute these artifacts to the first reoccupation of the site since its last abandonment in the Paleolithic. Since there is no evidence for animal domestication, a key element of the local Neolithic, neither here in Faya nor in other synchroneous sites, the classification of this layer has changed. Layers above this Late Palaeolithic level are less distinct and have not provided significant information about later prehistoric occupation.

== Significance ==
Although no human fossils have been found at Jebel Faya, Armitage and others have argued that the Assemblage C artifacts, dated to 125,000 years BP, were produced by anatomically modern humans (AMH). This is because Assemblage C resembles contemporary east and northeast African technology more than the technology found at sites elsewhere on the Arabian peninsula. As a result, the evidence at Jebel Faya has been used to support the idea of an early dispersal of AMH from the Horn of Africa across southern Arabia and into southern Asia. According to this theory, modern humans dispersed out of Africa before the eruption of the Toba supervolcano 70–75,000 years BP. This claim is based on excavations at Jwalapuram in India by Petraglia et al., who argue that assemblages found in pre- and post-Toba eruption layers indicate the continuous presence of AMH. For Petraglia and his colleagues, the presence of AMH at Jebel Faya 125,000 years ago could be evidence of an early dispersal route out of Africa, which humans could have followed to south Asia. However, there is strong opposition to this notion, as critics have argued that the Assemblage C evidence is not enough to confirm the presence of AMH from Africa. According to Paul Mellars, who believes that significant modern human dispersals did not occur until after the Toba eruption, “There's not a scrap of evidence here that these were made by modern humans, nor that they came from Africa.”

Studies about Jebel Faya's environmental context have indicated the potential for human dispersals out of Africa during humid periods in southern Arabia. These periods coincide with occupation at FAY-NE1, and depict activity at Jebel Faya as a cycle of occupation and abandonment according to the availability of water and vegetation. However, although these studies demonstrate the site's attractiveness during humid periods, there is an ongoing debate about the identity of its occupants.

Due to their dissimilarity from any other Middle or Late Stone Age assemblages, Assemblages B and A have been attributed to indigenous developments, which may indicate that Jebel Faya was inhabited continuously. However, this conclusion has been questioned due to genetic evidence of a more rapid dispersal of AMH out of Africa, meaning the Paleolithic assemblages may be the products of unrelated populations.

== See also ==
- History of the United Arab Emirates
- List of Ancient Settlements in the UAE
- Skhul and Qafzeh hominids
- Middle Awash
- Wadi Al Helo
