= National Library and Archives (UAE) =

National Library and Archives الأرشيف والمكتبة الوطنية
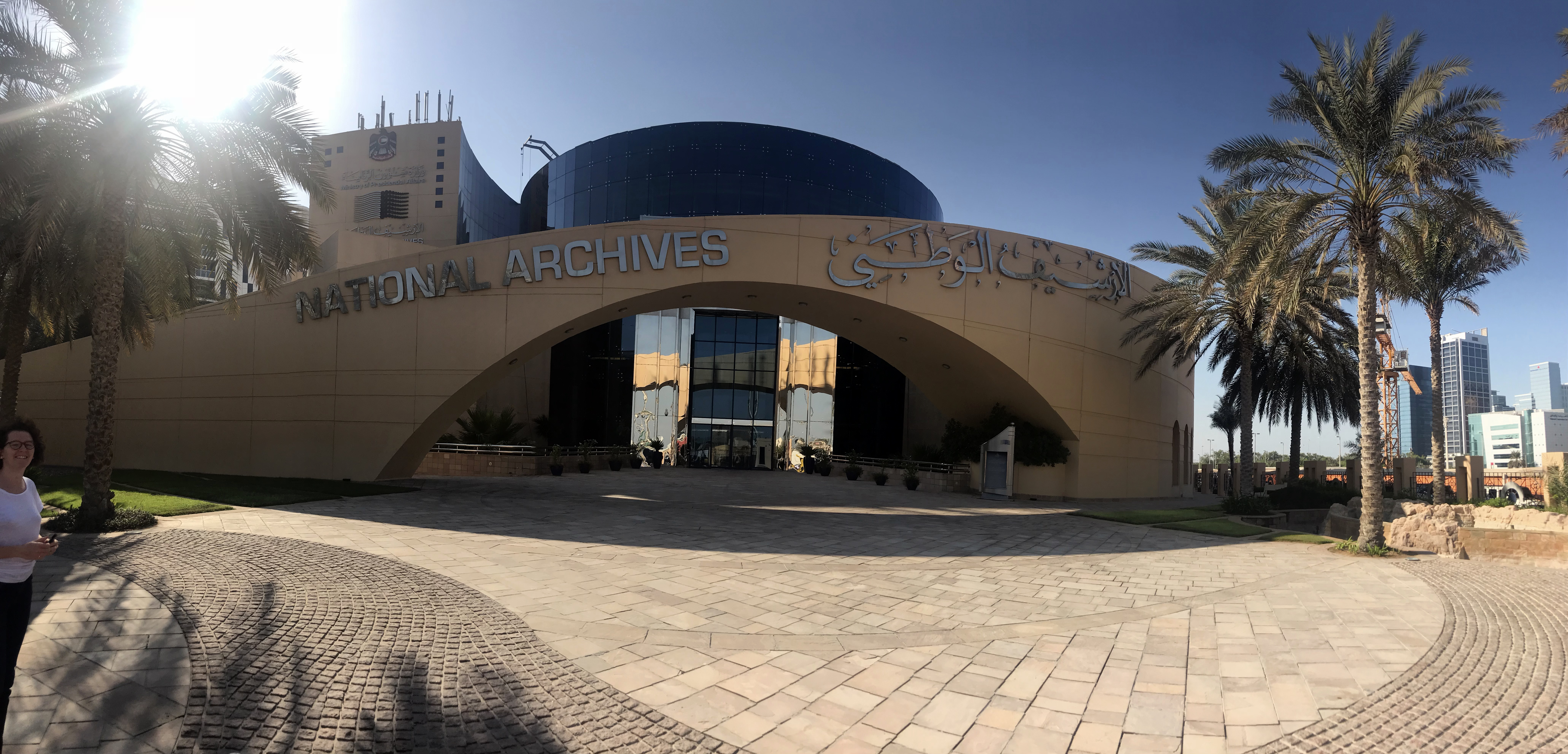
- Abbreviation: NLA
- Formation: 1968
- Type: Government agency
- Purpose: National Library and Archive
- Headquarters: Abu Dhabi
- Region served: UAE
- President: Mansour bin Zayed Al Nahyan
- Director-General: Abdulla Majid Al Ali
- Parent organization: Ministry of Presidential Affairs (UAE)
- Affiliations: UNESCO; ICA; IFLA; GCC; AFLI
- Website: www.nla.ae
- Formerly called: National Library and Archives (2014-2021), Center for Documentation and Research, National Center for Documentation and Research (2008-2014)

The National Library And Archives (NLA) is a leading research and archival institution based in Abu Dhabi charged with preserving and documenting the history and heritage of the United Arab Emirates and the Gulf region in general. The NLA was established in 1968 by Zayed bin Sultan Al Nahyan, first President of the UAE, under the name of Center for Documentation and Research (CDR). Forty years later, the late UAE President Sheikh Khalifa bin Zayed Al Nahyan issued Law No. (7) for 2008 designating the Center as the official National Archives of the UAE, under the name National Center for Documentation and Research (NCDR). The law specifies the NCDR jurisdiction to collect, preserve and archive documents to promote cultural and historical awareness and provide researchers access to the valuable materials held by the Center. In 2014, Sheikh Khalifa bin Zayed Al Nahyan issued the federal law no. (1) of 2014, changing the name to National Archives.

As of 2021 the NLA was ranked the sixth most advanced organization in its category worldwide in term of the tools and technology employed.

== Vision and Mission ==
Under the directives of its Chairman, Sheikh Mansour bin Zayed Al Nahyan, Deputy Prime Minister and Minister of Presidential Affairs, the NLA acts as the Nation's Memory. The NLA's Mission is to preserve documentary heritage through distinctive archival, documentation and research services in order to provide decision makers and the public with trusted information and to enhance civic spirit and national identity, while its Vision is to provide distinctive archival, documentation and research services.

The NLA is the trusted custodian of the Government records of the UAE responsible for:

- Developing government archives through application of best archival policies and procedures.
- Building our collections through constant expansion of our archives, library and research facilities.
- Preserving our collections by ensuring protection and restoration of the acquisitions.
- Making our holdings widely available and easily accessible through in-house facilities and outreach programs.

== Halls Of The NLA ==
The NLA has a number of halls; each is equipped and dedicated for a different purpose. The main halls include:

=== Sheikh Zayed Hall ===
This hall reminisces the past of the UAE, celebrates its present, and envisions its future, integrating all three together to display the UAE's identity. The hall resembles a museum, and makes a memorable experience for its visitors.

=== Sheikh Khalifa Bin Zayed Hall ===
This hall is an auditorium, with the capacity to fit over 600 people. It also facilitates simultaneous translation in five languages, in addition to having an electronic wireless voting system. It is often used to host conferences and seminars.

=== Sheikh Mohamed Bin Zayed Hall ===
This virtual reality theater is an interactive 3D space created using special software that blends fiction and reality. Inside the theater, you can watch documentary films about the United Arab Emirates using 3D technology. It has advanced audio-visual technology that immerses the audience in a virtual environment, allowing them to experience the UAE's history and progress. The documentary films shown in this theater leave a strong impression on visitors, particularly students and children, who can relate to the images and feel like they are part of the story. This theater is ideal for smaller gatherings and meetings.

== International Council Congress (ICA) 2023 ==
In Abu Dhabi, United Arab Emirates, the National Library and Archives (NLA) has confirmed that all preparations are in place for the International Council Congress (ICA) 2023, scheduled to take place from October 9 to 13. This announcement was made during the inaugural meeting of the organizing committee for this significant archival event. The meeting outlined the conference and exhibition activities to be held at the Abu Dhabi National Exhibition Centre (ADNEC), as well as the arrangements for hosting international delegations and the services provided to them.

Dr. Abdullah Al-Raisi, the Cultural Adviser at the Presidential Court and the Chairperson of the Organizing Committee for the ICA Congress 2023, announced that the event will carry the theme "Enriching Knowledge Societies." He also highlighted the historical significance of the UAE in the Middle East hosting this event for the first time. This achievement is a source of pride, not only for the National Library and Archives but also for the participants, UAE citizens, and all residents of this special region.

== Affiliations ==
The National Library And Archives is a member of a number of organizations, including the following:

- United Nations Educational, Scientific, and Cultural Organization (UNESCO)
- The International Council on Archives (ICA)
- International Federation for Libraries and Information (IFLA)
- Arab Federation for Libraries and Information (AFLI)
- Middle East Studies Association (MESA)
- Oral History Association (OHA)
