= Al Faya =

Heritage village in the Sharjah , United Arab Emirates

Al Faya الفاية Al Faya, Sharjah
- Heritage Village
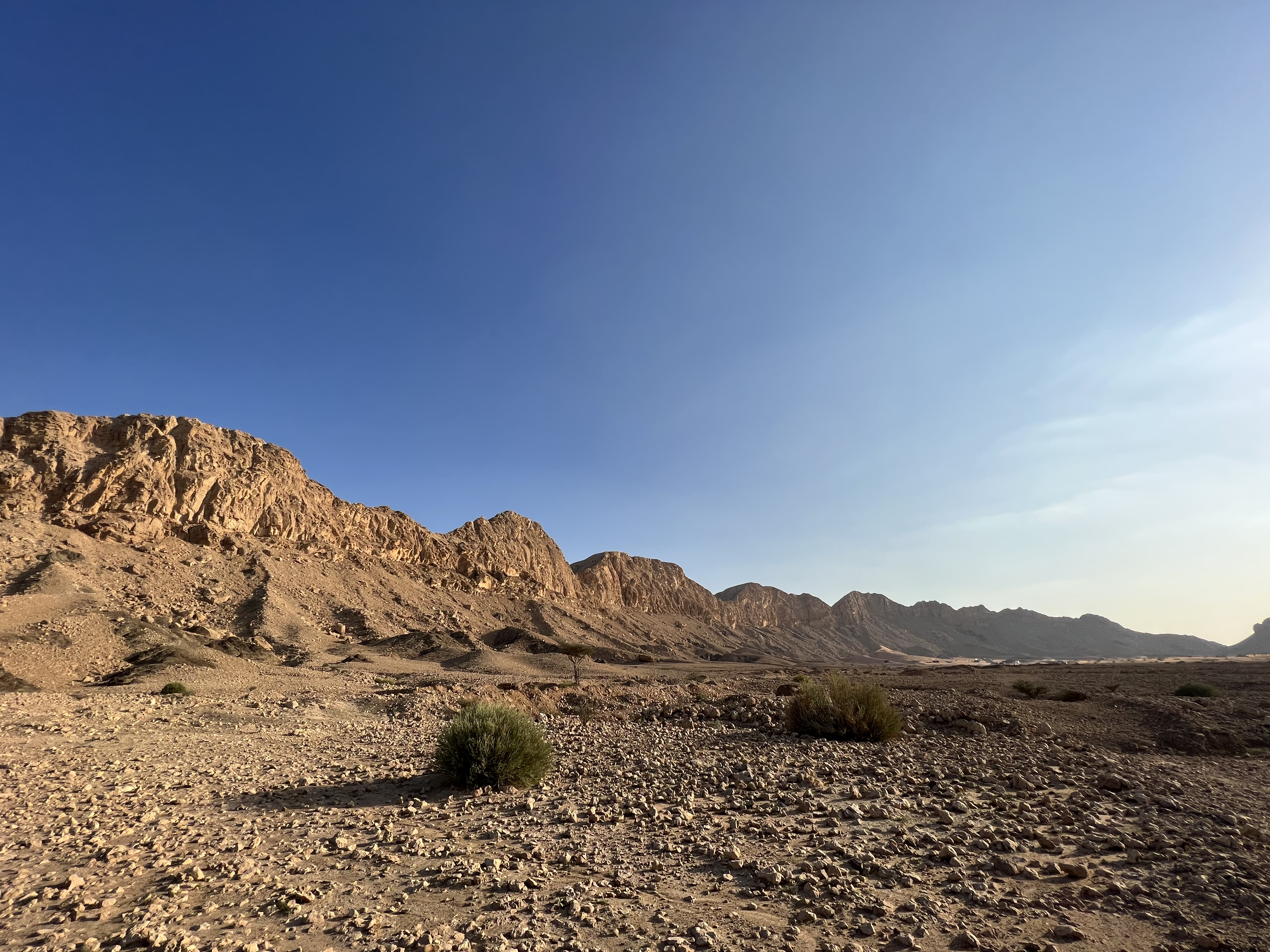
- view of Jebel Faya in Al Faya
- Nickname: Mountain village in Sharjah
- Location within United Arab Emirates Location within Middle East Location within Asia
- Coordinates: 25.046176°N 55.804462°E
- Country: United Arab Emirates
- Emirate: Sharjah

Government
  - Type: Absolute monarchy
  - Sheikh: Sultan bin Muhammad Al-Qasimi

Population (2022)
  - Total: 5,000+

Al Faya (Arabic: الفاية, romanized: Adh-Faya) is a desert settlement and archaeological locality in the Mleiha Municipality of Emirate of Sharjah, United Arab Emirates.

Archaeological investigations at the adjoining limestone ridge of Jebel Faya uncovered stratified cultural horizons that show intermittent human presence from 210,000 to 6,000 years ago. This site was added to the UNESCO World Heritage Site list in July 2025, as the archaeological record of human adaptation to the alternating arid and rainy environment met the organisation's third and fourth selection criteria. Al Faya was the second site in the United Arab Emirates to be inscribed on the UNESCO World Heritage Site list.

== See also ==
- List of Ancient Settlements in the UAE
- Archaeology of the United Arab Emirates
- Jebel Faya
