= Elephant Rock (Iceland) =

Rock formation in Iceland

Coordinates: 63.4394°N 20.3110°W

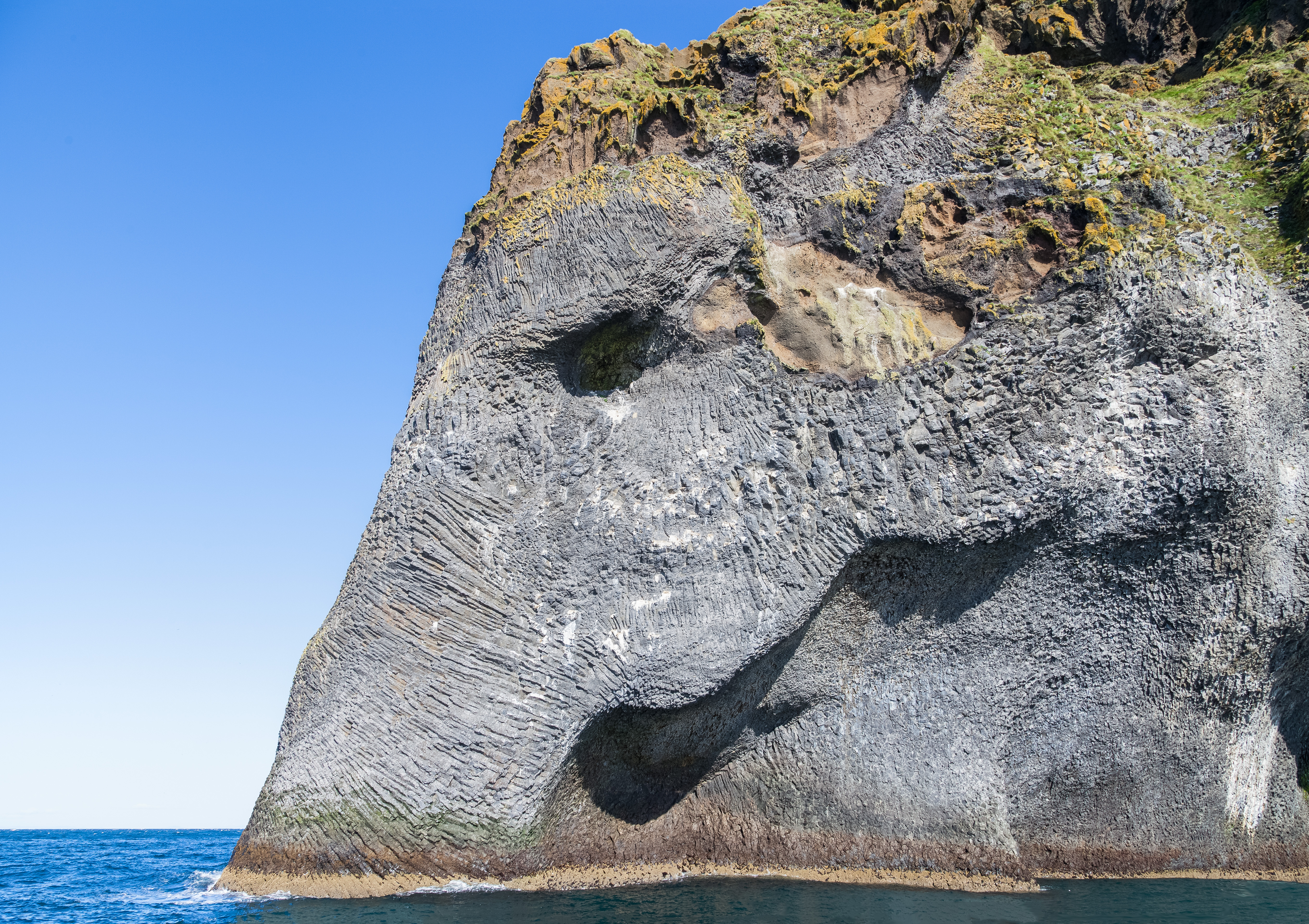
Elephant Rock, a natural rock formation

The Elephant Rock (Icelandic: Halldórsskora) is a natural rock formation located on the island of Heimaey in the Westman Islands archipelago. The Elephant Rock is formed primarily of basalt rock, which developed through volcanic activity. The rock formation is thought to have emerged from the volcanic eruption of Eldfell in 1973, which significantly shaped the landscape of Heimaey.

Situated along cliffs of Heimaey on the island's northwestern edge, Elephant Rock is part of an eroded volcanic complex shaped by geological forces over thousands of years. The characteristic basalt columns visible on the formation were created by the slow cooling and contraction of lava, resulting in hexagonal columns typical of columnar basalt formations. These columns, perpendicular to the cooling surface, contribute to the appearance of the Elephant Rock. The formation has been heavily shaped by natural erosion and weathering, with the ocean surf carving caves and distinctive shapes into the rock face over time.

Icelandic folklore offers various interpretations of the rock's origins. One tale suggests the rock was once a real elephant enchanted or punished by the gods. After resting by the water's edge, the creature fell into an eternal sleep and was turned to stone. Another legend posits that human hands may have carved the elephantine shape, creating a work of art to honor the island's heritage. Some people believe the formation resembles the mythical creature Cthulhu, a monstrous figure from the works of H. P. Lovecraft, an American writer. The Elephant Rock is a popular attraction due to its unique structure that resembles an elephant.
