= Mleiha =

Mleiha ملَيْحَة Meleihah Malaihah
- Town
- Mleiha Municipality is in the eastern part of Sharjah's Central Region

- Location of Mleiha in the UAE Mleiha (Persian Gulf)
- Country: United Arab Emirates
- Emirate: Sharjah

Government
  - Type: Absolute monarchy
  - Sheikh: Sultan bin Muhammad Al-Qasimi

Population (2015)
  - Total: 4,768

âMleiha, also Mileiha or Malaihah (Arabic: ملَيْحَة), is a town in the Emirate of Sharjah, the United Arab Emirates (UAE) with a population of 4,768 (2015), located some 25 km south of the inland Sharjah town of Dhaid. It is the location of archaeological remnants dating from the Neolithic to pre-Islamic Arabia and home to the Mleiha Archaeological Centre. Mleiha is a UNESCO World Heritage Site.

== History of Mleiha ==
The widespread archaeological evidence unearthed throughout the Mleiha area dates back as far as the Palaeolithic period, some 130,000 years ago.

Archaeologists from the German University of Tübingen made the original finds of tools at the site of Faya-1 at Mleiha, which have been dated using single-grain optically-stimulated luminescence (OSL) to at least 125-130,000 years ago.

Settlements have also been identified pointing to Neolithic communities at Mleiha from 11,000 years ago, with finds of tools at the location consistent with the Neolithic Ubaid or Arabian Bifacial tradition of 5,000-3,100 BCE. Succeeding Bronze Age evidence dating from 3,000 BCE onwards at Mleiha includes an Umm Al Nar tomb, something absent from the nearby necropolis at Jebel Buhais which otherwise represents uninterrupted evidence of human burial throughout all periods of human settlement in the area.

The centuries that followed witnessed the introduction of the underground falaj irrigation system and the cultivation of dates and other cereal crops.

== The 'Mleiha period' ==
An extensive fortified compound, 'Mleiha Fort', nearby the site of the present archaeological center, was discovered in the late 1990s and is thought to have been possibly the seat of an ancient South Arabian kingdom dating back to 300 BCE.

The period from 300 BCE to the resolution of the Ridda Wars has been dubbed both the Mleiha period and the Pre-Islamic Recent (PIR), and follows on from the dissolution of Darius III's Persian empire. Although the era has been called Hellenistic, Alexander the Great's conquests went no further than Persia and he left Arabia untouched.

Mleiha appears to have been a cultural crossroads, with two distinctive cultures attested in the PIR - along with domestic production of ceramics, Greek amphorae have been found dating to between 100 and 300 BCE, but there are also finds of engraved bronze bowls and alabaster-ware, distinctively south-Arabian, and marked both in Aramaic and Hasaitic. Inscriptions mention the ‘King of Oman’, one particularly rich find dated between 214 222 BCE reads, in Aramaic, ‘This is the memorial of Amud, son of Gurr, which built over him his son Amud, son of Amud, year 90 (or 97)’ and then, in Hasaitic, ‘Memorial and tomb of Amud, son of Gurr, son of Ali, inspector of the King of Oman, which built over him his son Amud, son of Amud, son of Gurr, inspector of the King of Oman.’

Mleiha at this time has been linked to Seleucid Persia, the Parthians, Sasanians and the peoples of southern Arabia. It also yields rare evidence of iron production, something almost entirely lacking during the Emirates' three Iron Ages, and there have been finds of nails through to weapons that are clearly of a local origin.

== Links to Ed Dur ==
Mleiha is strongly linked to the Ancient Near Eastern city of Ed Dur on the UAE's west coast. Similarities in burial rituals (of laying animals to rest with their owners) and vessels, decorations and small bronze snake figures have also been unearthed. Camels buried with their heads reversed are a common feature of both the animal burials at the coastal city of Ed Dur and Mleiha inland. Macedonian-style coinage unearthed at Ed-Dur dates back to Alexander the Great. Hundreds of coins were found both there and at Mleiha featuring a head of Heracles and a seated Zeus on the obverse, and bearing the name of Abi'el in Aramaic. These coins match moulds found at Mleiha which, together with finds of slag at the site, suggests the existence of a metallurgical centre. Contemporary Greek manuscripts have given the exports from Ed-Dur as 'pearls, purple dye, clothing, wine, gold and slaves, and a great quantity of dates' and there is a strong history of trade between the coast and the interior. Similarities in burial rituals — of laying animals to rest with their owners — and vessels, decorations and small bronze snake figures have also been unearthed. Camels buried with their heads reversed are a common feature of both the animal burials at Ed-Dur and inland Mleiha.

It is thought that Ed Dur is the site of Omana, mentioned by both Pliny and Strabo as an important town in the Lower Gulf. The city is referred to in the anonymous Periplus of the Erythraean Sea, a documentation of trade between Alexandria and India, and the Periplus indicates that Omana was the most important port in the Gulf during the first century CE and was linked with the port of Apologos (al-Ubulla) at the head of the Gulf, which has been linked to Basra. This trade down the Gulf, via camel trains inland from the Gulf to Syria, would explain the richness of finds of Roman materials at Ed Dur. Contemporary Greek manuscripts have given the exports from Ed Dur as 'pearls, purple dye, clothing, wine, gold and slaves, and a great quantity of dates'.

Continuing evidence of millennia of trade between southeastern Arabia and the various civilizations of Mesopotamia is found at Ed Dur, with Characene coins from the reign of Attambelos III to VI, as well as a small number of Nabatean coins from the reign of Aretas IV found at the site. Aretas ruled from approximately 9 BCE to 40CE.

== The fall of Mleiha ==
There is evidence in the archaeological record of Mleiha that the city and area underwent a great sack at a time contiguous to the rule of the first Sasanian king, Ardashir I, who reigned from 224–240 CE. Pillaged graves and firelines attest to a conflict, but Mleiha had already undergone a period of decline. While both Mleiha and Ed Dur were, in their eflorescence, major centres of regional power and wealth, their decline meant that by 200 CE, both cities had shrunk and occupation appears to have been concentrated around central fortified areas, testament to a long series of conflicts.

Although the Sasanians recorded campaigns against Arabia, they were limited and there was no imposition of direct rule but, in northern Arabia at least, the Sasanians' Lakhmid clients held sway. Evidence of Sasanian artefacts is found at Kush, Khatt, Hulayla and Mleiha but there is scant evidence of any enduring Sasanian occupation of Southeastern Arabia.

== Gallery ==
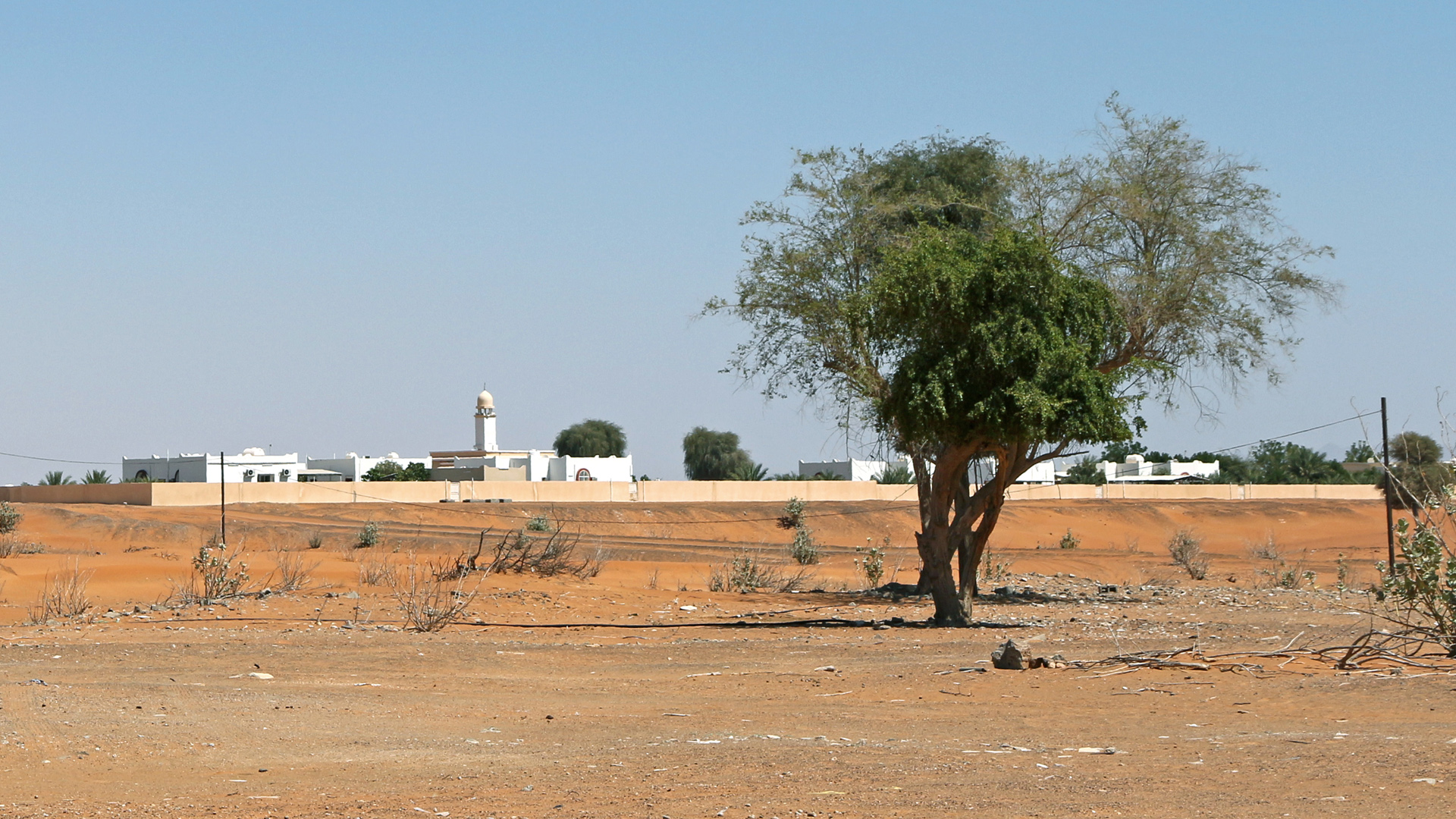
Overview of the Locality

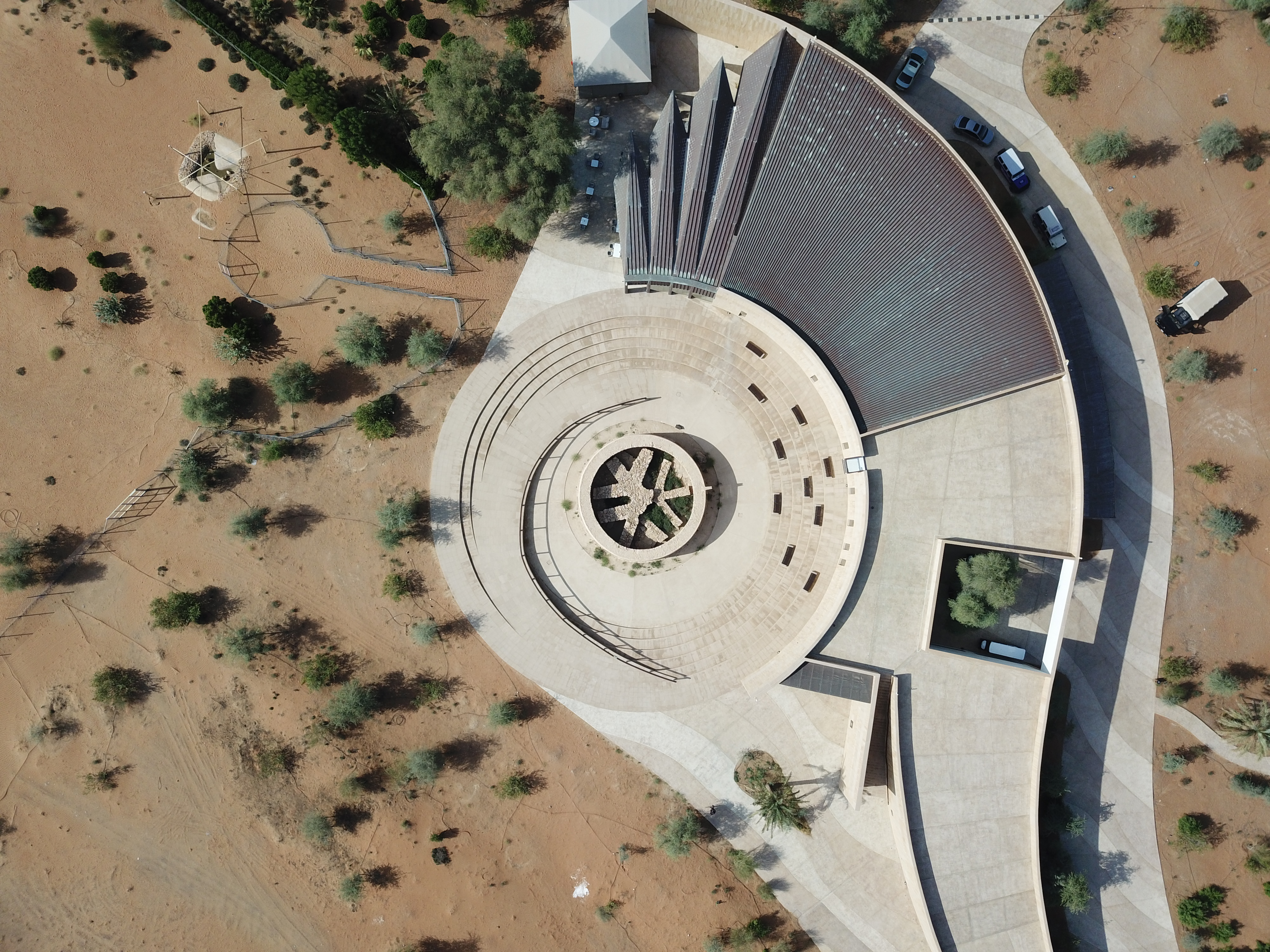
Mleiha Archaeological Centre (2016)

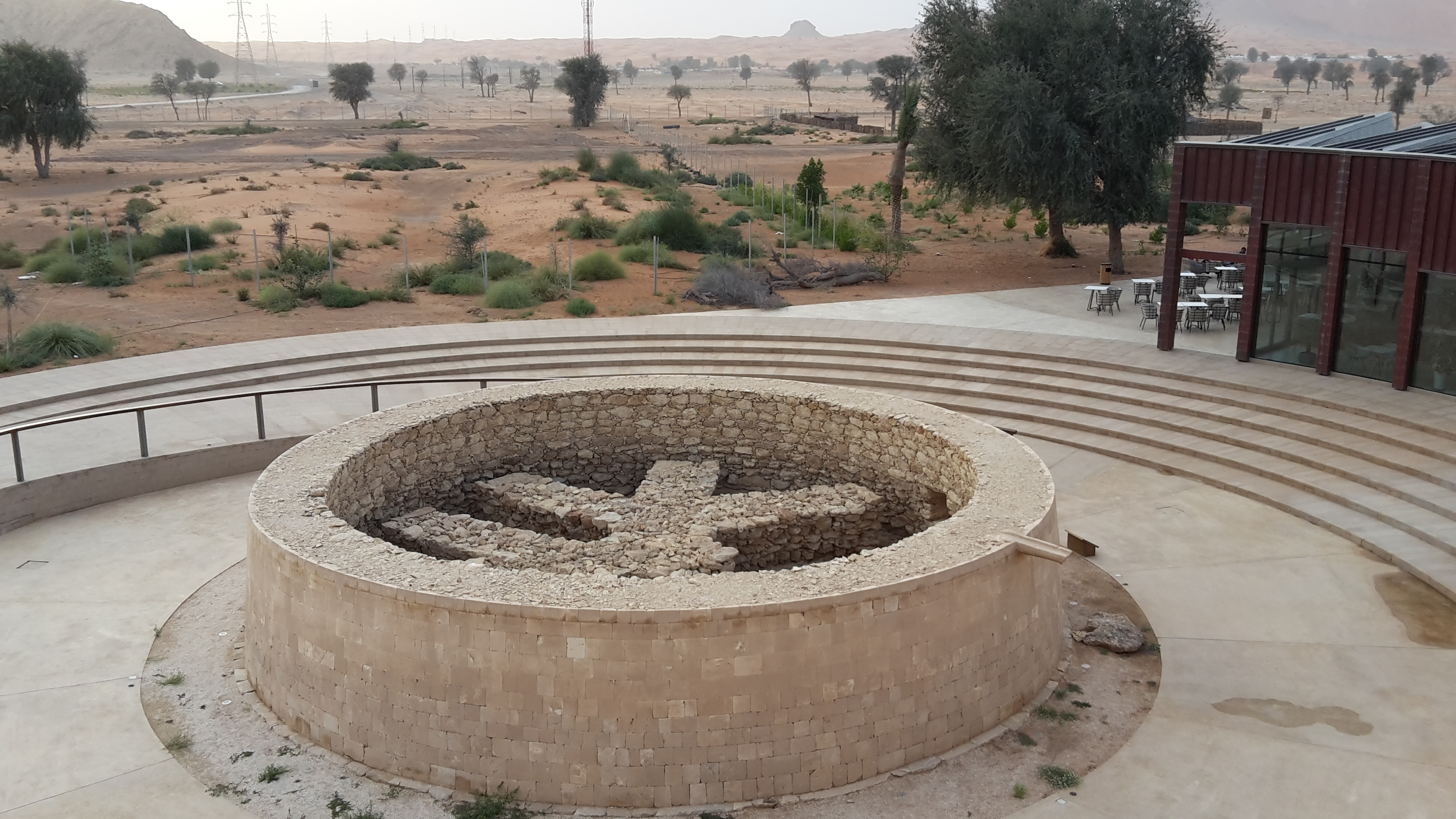
Bronze Age Tomb (c. 2300 BC)

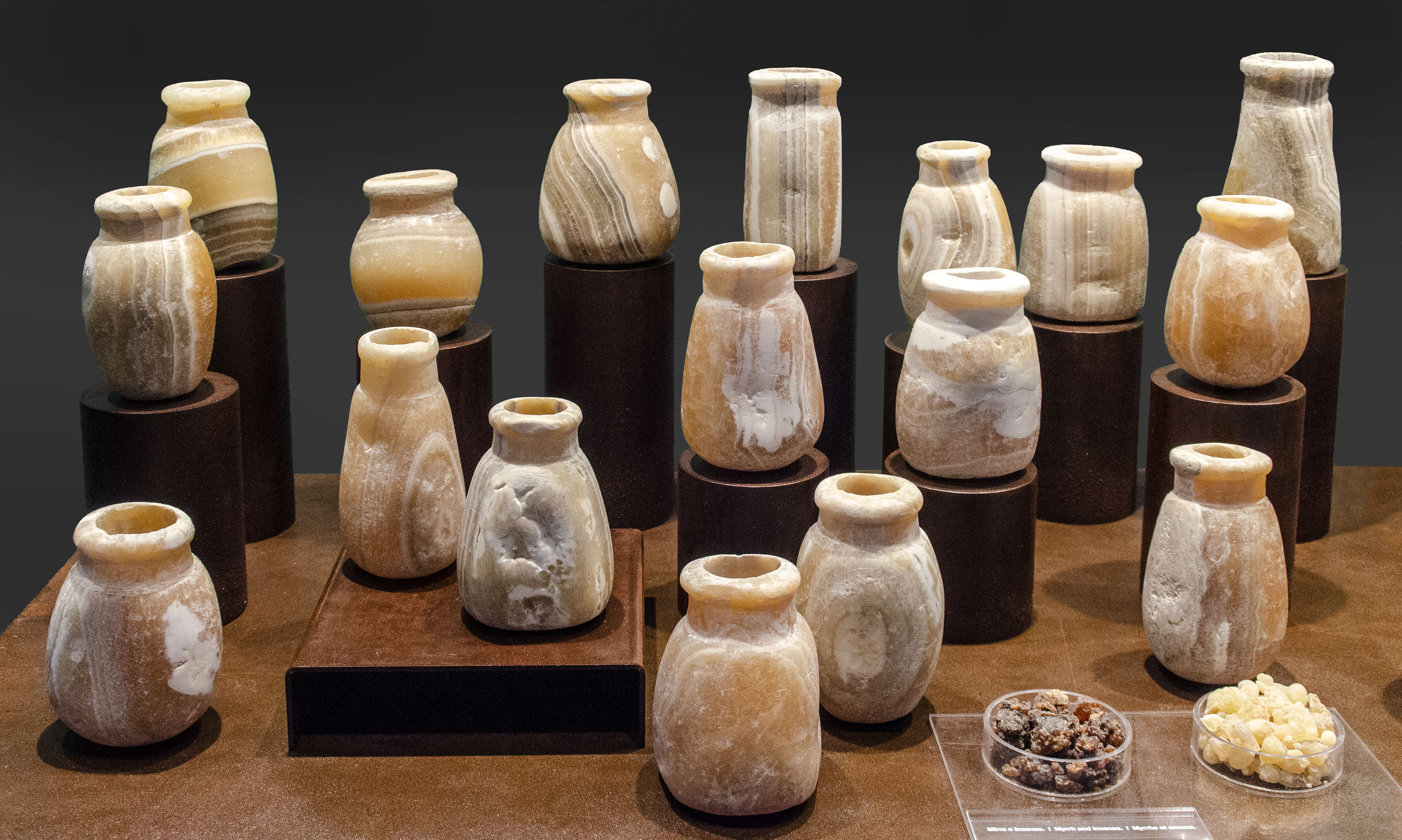
Vases (onyx) (1st century BC)

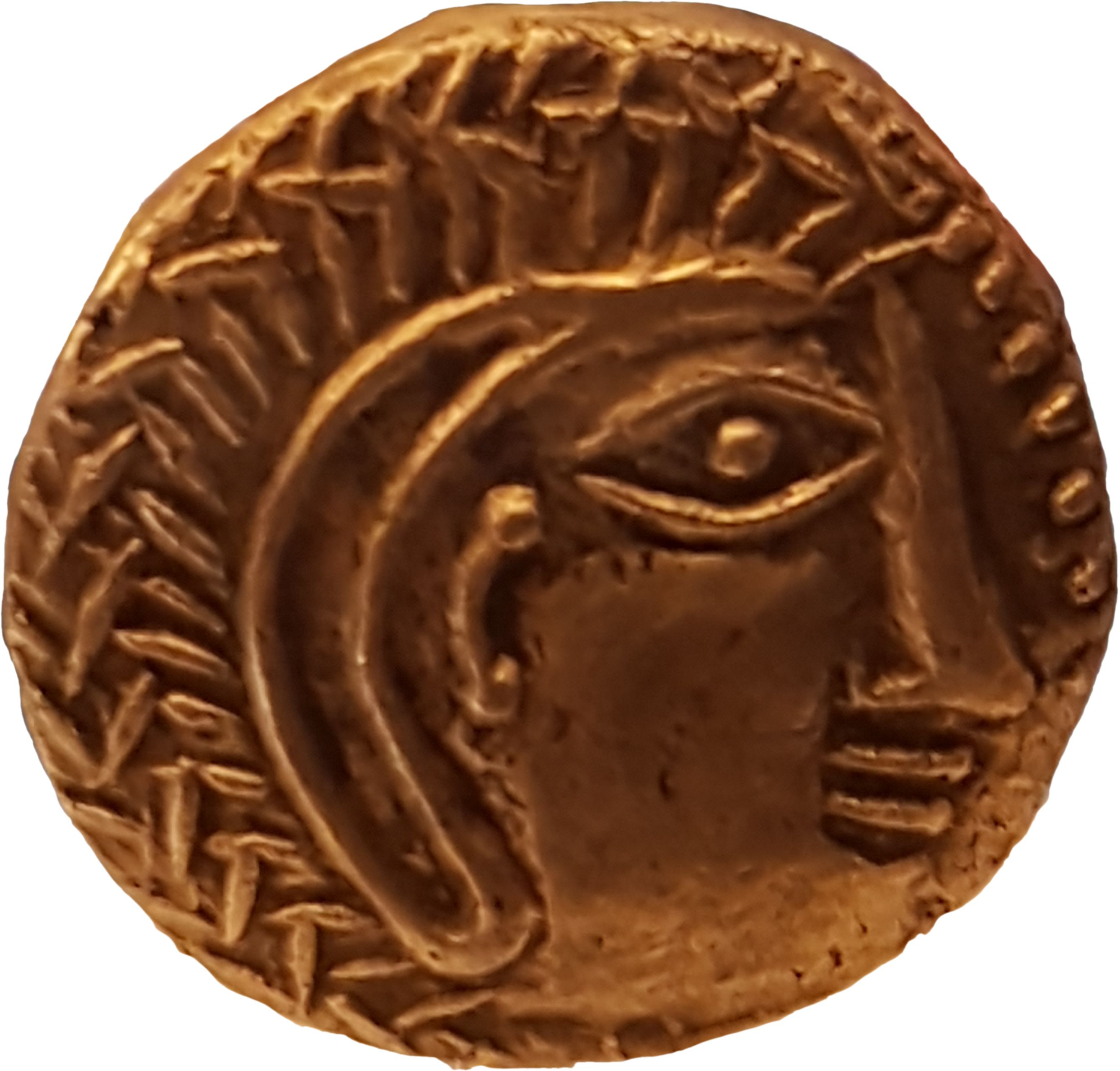
Coin (2nd century AD)

== See also ==
- List of Ancient Settlements in the UAE
