= Elephant Rock Ride =

The Elephant Rock Ride, or rock, was an annual road and mountain bicycling event hosted in Castle Rock, Colorado. It was created by Scot Harris in 1987 as a 100-mile road bike route to be "a way to start the [Colorado] cycling season". There were multiple concurrent rides hosted ranging from 7 to 105 miles in order to accommodate a broad range of skill. A maximum of 7,000 participants could register each year to ride.

The Elephant Rock Ride was primarily sponsored by Subaru and the full event was called the Subaru Elephant Rock Cycling Festival. Because of rapid growth in the area, along with challenges from increased traffic and ongoing construction, event director Scott Olmsted decided to conclude the ride in 2022.

== See also ==
- Subaru Elephant Rock Ride (Official Site)
