= Shairi, Ras Al Khaimah =

Village in the UAE

Shairi ديرة الشعيري (Arabic)
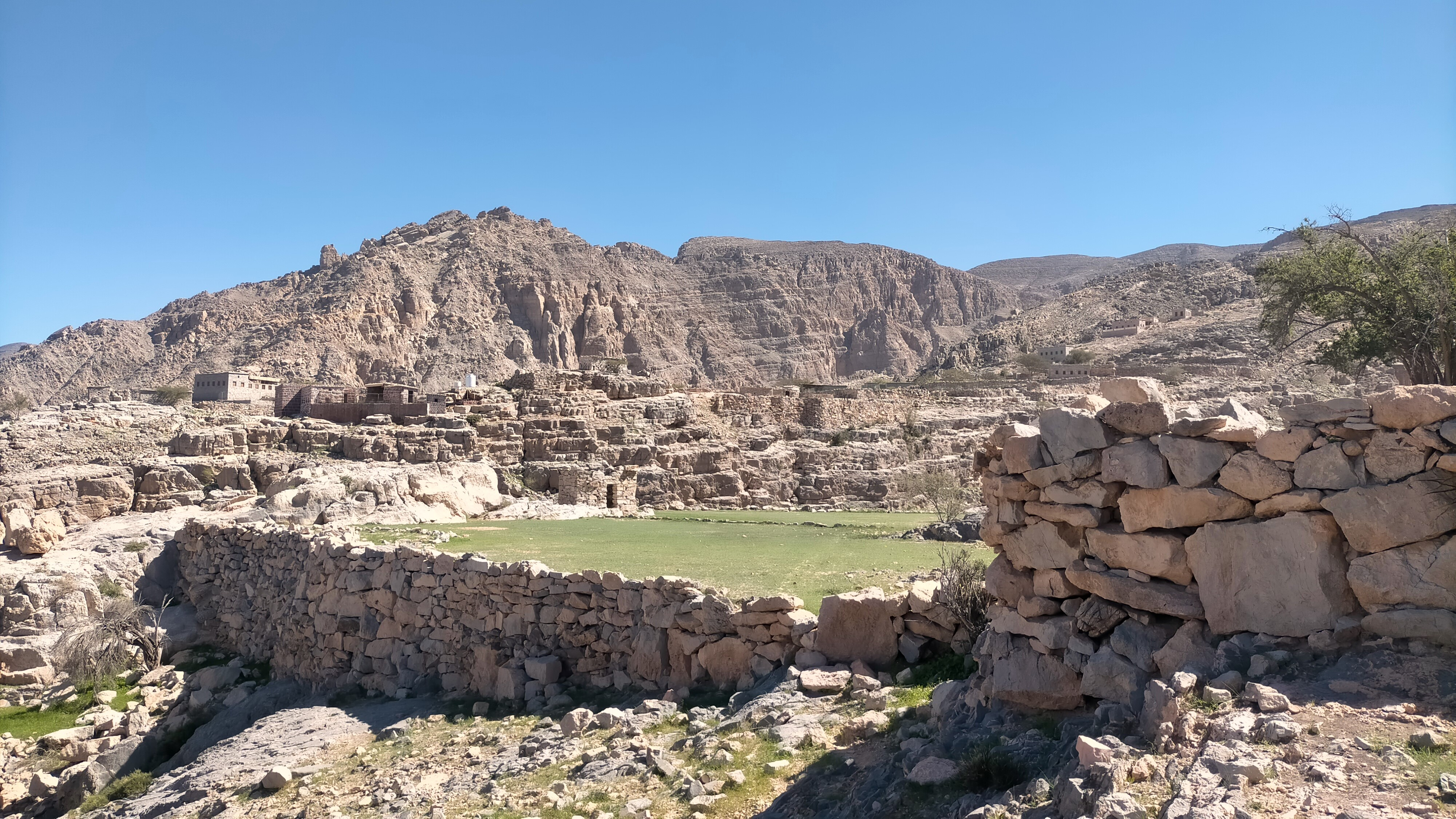
- Shairi is located between the two arms of the Wadi Samarat, in Ras al-Khaimah

- Location within United Arab Emirates Location within Persian Gulf Location within West and Central Asia
- Coordinates: 25°41′22″N 56°05′18″E
- Country: United Arab Emirates
- Emirate: Ras Al Khaimah

Area
  - Total: 0.12 km^{2} (0.046 sq mi)
- Elevation: 810 m (2,660 ft)
- Time zone: UTC+04:00

Shairi (Arabic: ديرة الشعيري, romanized: Sha'īrī) is a small agricultural and livestock town, located in the northeast of the United Arab Emirates (UAE), in the Hajar Mountains, Emirate of Ras Al Khaimah.

The town extends along a small plateau, approximately at an altitude of 810 m (2,660 ft), divided into two areas by a tributary ravine of the Wadi Samarat (also known as Wādī Khalkhāl), which follows its course from southeast to northwest.

The western area of Shairi overlooks the hydrographic subbasin of the Wadi Madnan / Wādī Midnān, a tributary of the Wadi Naqab, very popular among canyoning and rock climbing fans, as it contains a deep canyon known such as Kirithon Canyon. The eastern area dominates the course of Wadi Samarat from the top of the cliff.

The town has about 40 houses, most of them renovated in a traditional style, and used as secondary housing for its inhabitants. Although there are also permanent residents, who carry out construction tasks and are mainly responsible for caring for the goats and maintaining the cultivation areas.

There are also numerous terraces intended for the cultivation of wheat and barley, several tanks, and small canals intended to collect runoff water and direct it towards cisterns and cultivation areas.

Two kilometres southeast of Shairi is the neighboring village of Samarat.

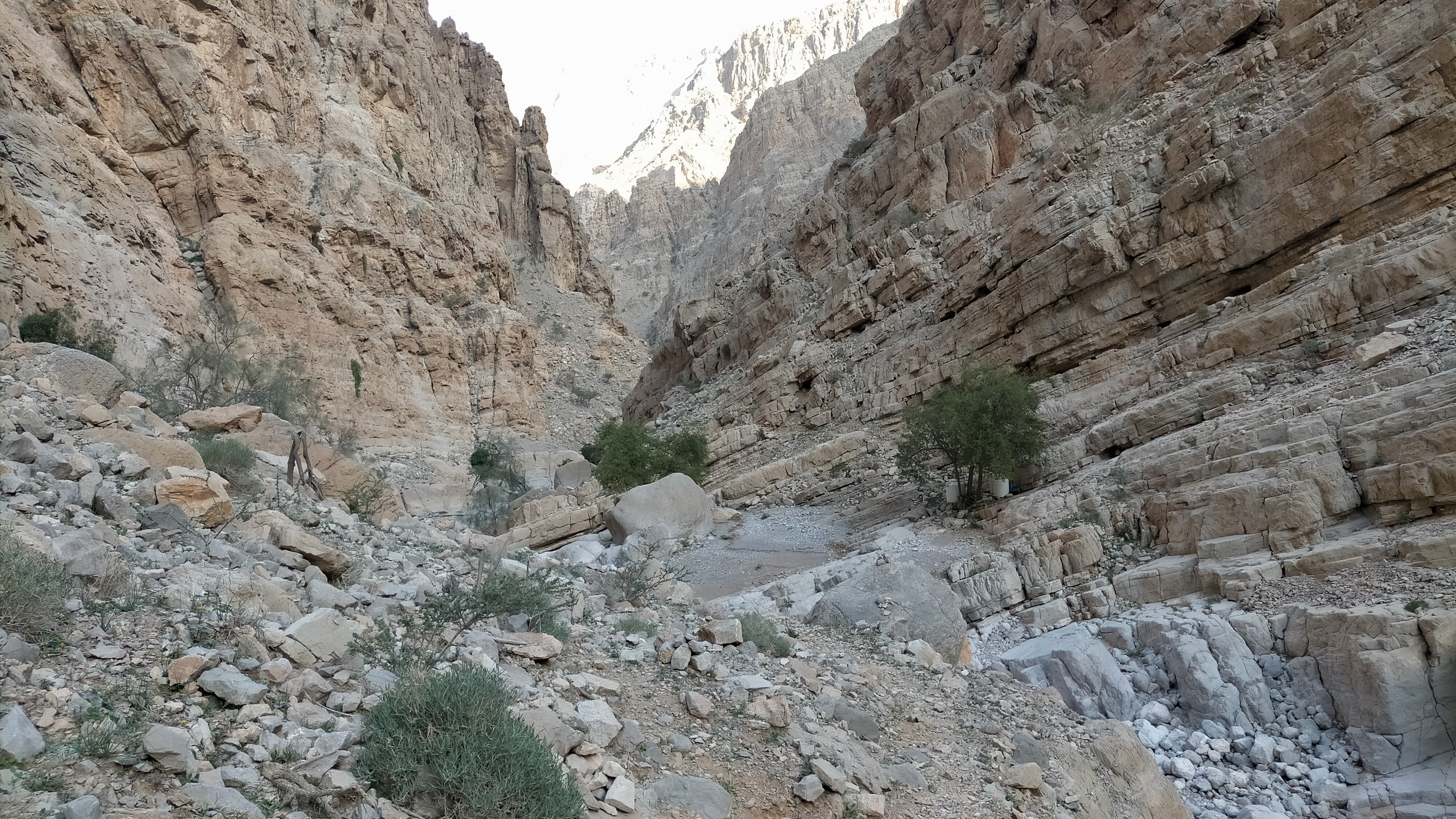
Wadi Samarat, tributary of Wadi Madnan and subtributary of Wadi Naqab. Canal towards Shairi village

Shairi can only be accessed by walking or with donkeys, for which there is a path or donkey trail that starts from Wadi Naqab, at the mouth of Wadi Madnan, and follows the course of Wadi Samarat towards the southeast for approximately 1.2 km (0.75 mi), until the fork with the canal that forms on the right an arm of the Wadi Samarat, which descends in a steep slope from the village of Shairi.

On the partially stepped climb towards the village, the path passes through a popular cave (Wadi Samarat Cave), and a few meters later it forks. The bridleway on the right heads to the western part of Shairi and the canyoning and rock climbing area of Kirithon Canyon in Wadi Madnan; and the one on the left heads towards the eastern part of the town, through a very steep path with some sections of stone stairs.

This itinerary has become in recent years one of the most popular routes in Ras al Khaimah, among hiking and climbing fans.

== Toponymy ==
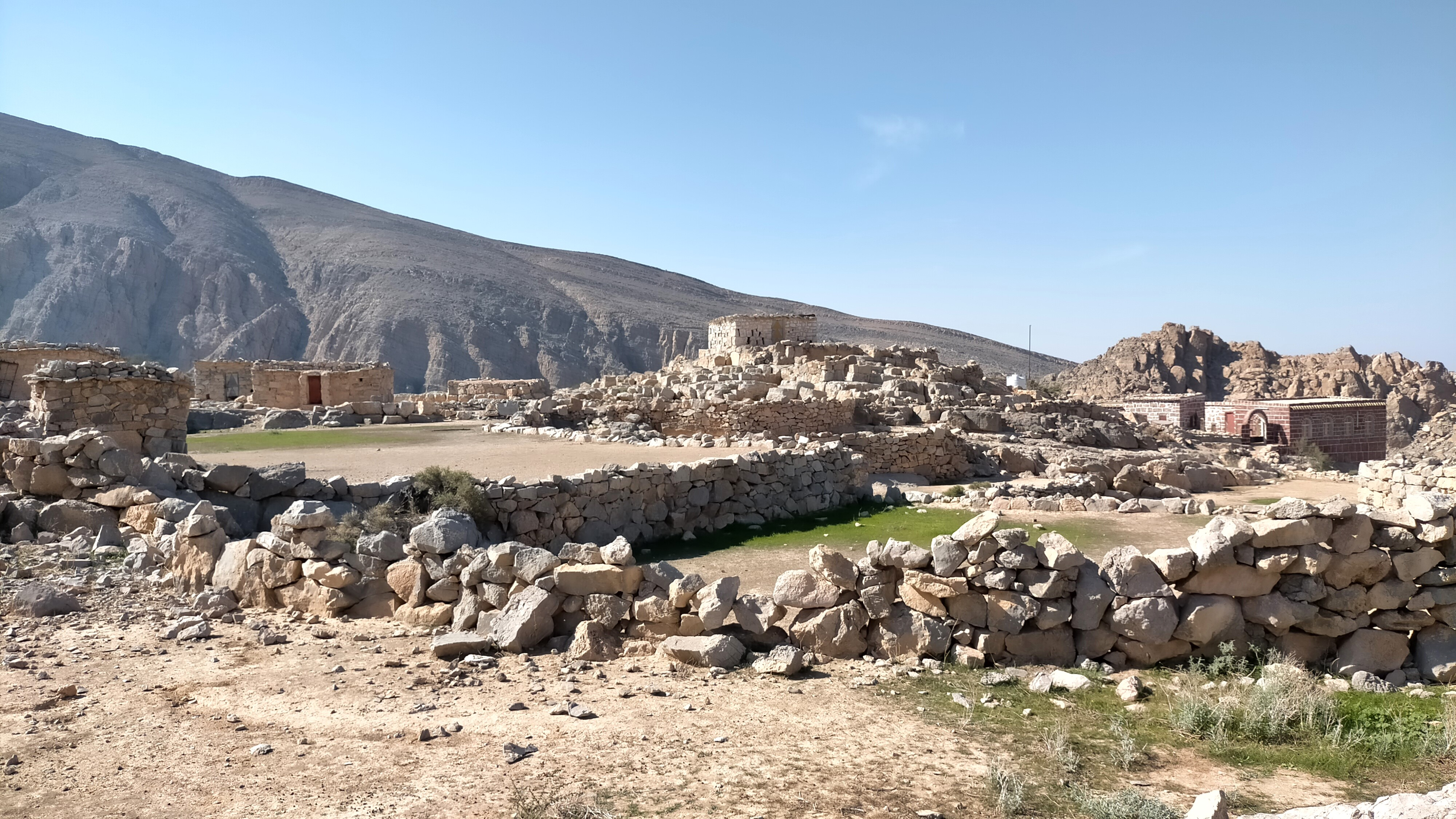
Eastern area of Shairi village, Ras Al Khaimah

Alternative names: Sha'īrī, Shairi, Shariya, Al-Shairi, Deira Al-Shairi, Sheri, Sherri, Shērī, Shīrī, Shari.

The names of the town of Shairi, Wadi Samarat, Samarat, Wadi Madnan and other place names in the area were recorded in the documentation and maps prepared between 1950 and 1960 by the British Arabist, cartographer, military officer and diplomat Julian F. Walker, during the work carried out to establish borders between the then-called Trucial States, later completed by the United Kingdom Ministry of Defense, on 1:100,000 scale maps published in 1971.

In The National Atlas of the United Arab Emirates it is referenced with the spelling Sha'īrī.

== Population ==
The entire area near Shairi, although initially populated by the Naqbiyin tribe (in Arabic: النقبي), also called Naqabi or Al-Naqabi (from which the name of Wadi Naqab comes), was occupied from approximately 1800, by the Habus tribe, which extended, among other territories, through the tribal area of Ahl Ghayl, to which Shairi belonged.

== See also ==
- List of wadis of the United Arab Emirates
- List of mountains in the United Arab Emirates
