= Wadi Ar Ribiyyah =

Wadi in UAE

Wadi Ar Ribiyyah Wādī Ar Rе̄biyyah
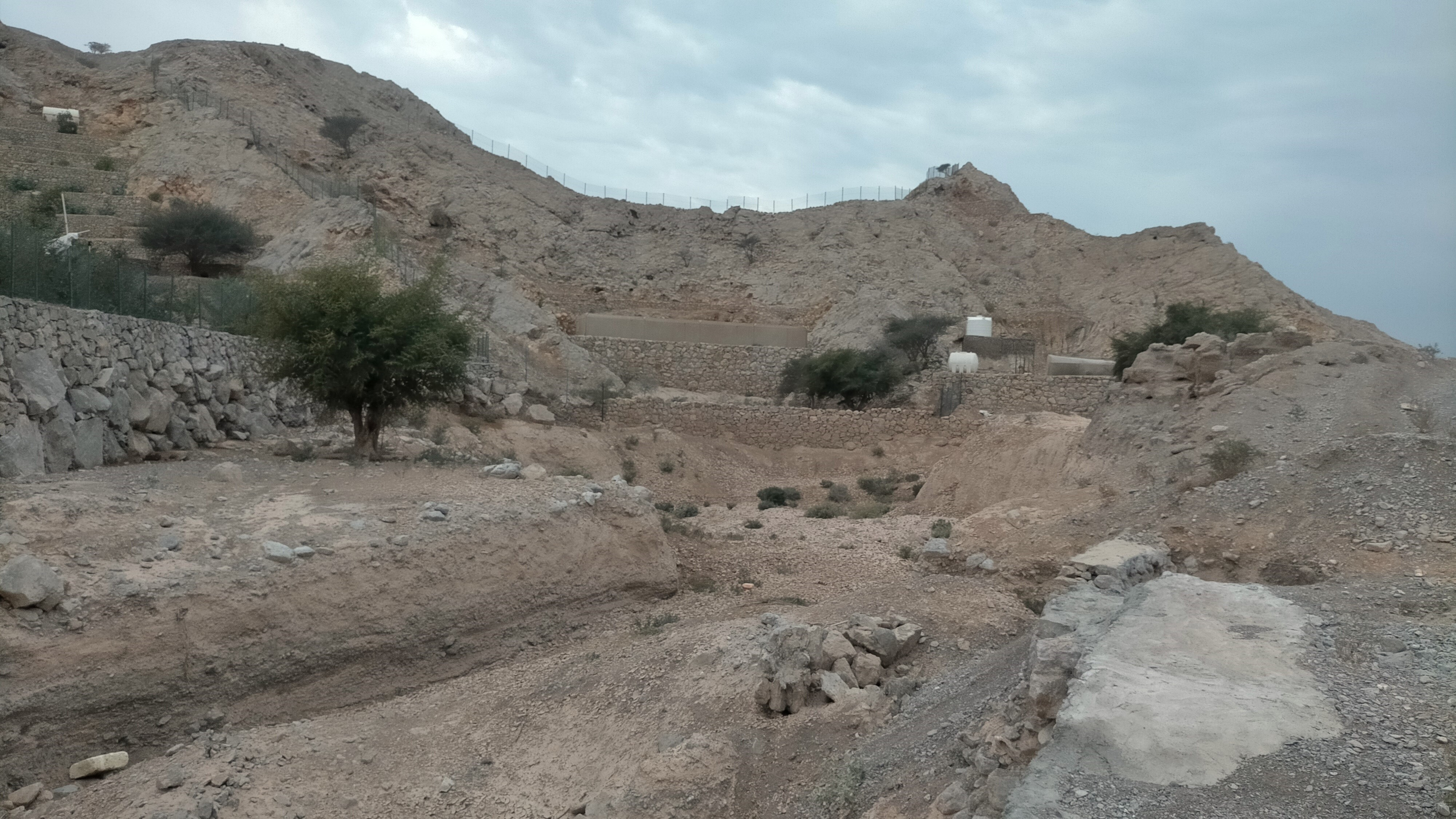

- Location within United Arab Emirates Location within Persian Gulf Location within West and Central Asia
- Native name: وادي الرِّيْبِيَّة (Arabic)

Location
- Country: United Arab Emirates
- Emirate: Ras Al Khaimah

Physical characteristics
- Source: In the mountainous area near the village of Slai Al-Ghalib
  - elevation: 470 m (1,540 ft), approximately
- Mouth: Coastal plain of gravel and sand known as Gravel Plain
  - coordinates: 25°44′05″N 56°01′38″E
  - elevation: 19 m (62 ft)
- Length: 5 km (3.1 mi)
- Basin size: 4.2 km^{2} (1.6 mi^{2})

Basin features
- Progression: Wadi. Intermittent flow
- River system: Wadi Ar Ribiyyah

Wadi Ar Ribiyyah (Arabic: وادي الرِّيْبِيَّة, romanized: Wādī Ar Rе̄biyyah) is a valley or dry river, with ephemeral or intermittent flow, which flows almost exclusively during the rainy season, located in the east of the United Arab Emirates, in the emirate of Ras Al Khaimah.

It is part of a group of small wadis with their own drainage basin, located on the coastal strip near the city of Ras al Khaimah, on the Persian Gulf, between the mouths of the Wadi Bih and the Wadi Naqab.

The Wadi Ar Ribiyyah drainage basin is only 4.2 km^{2} (1.6 mi^{2}), and is bordered to the north by Wadi Al Ghafiyyah; to the south by Wadi Ramilah; to the east by Wadi Naqab; and to the west by the coastal gravel and sand plain known as the Gravel Plain, located in the northern part of the Jiri plain.

== Course ==
Wadi Ar Ribiyyah flows from east to west and has a total length of approximately 5 km (3.1 mi).

Its main source is located in the mountainous area near the village of Slai Al-Ghalib (Arabic: سلي الغالب), almost on the border with the Wadi Halu hydrographic sub-basin (Wadi Naqab basin), and at an altitude of approximately 470 m (1,540 ft).

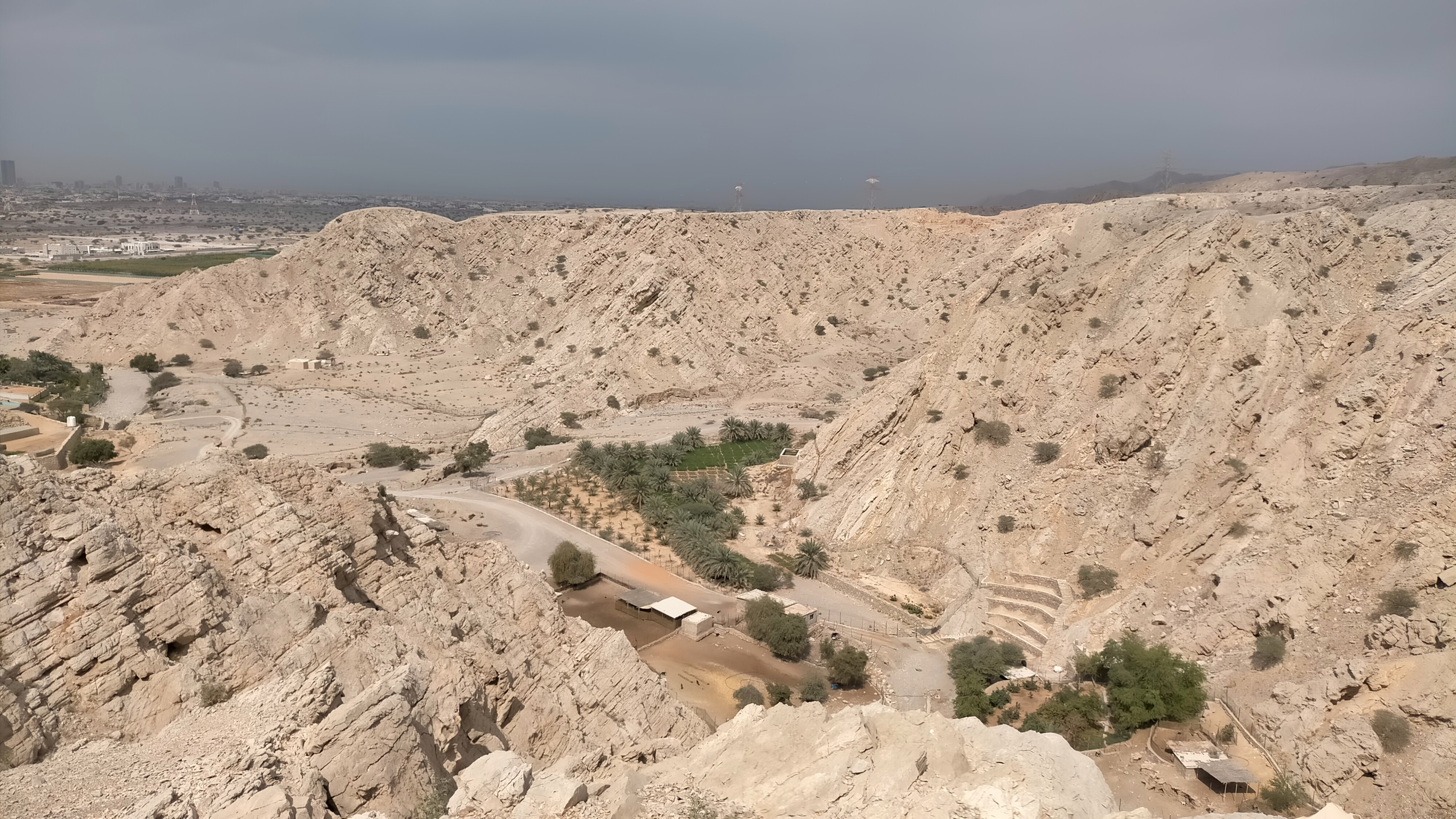
Views towards the confluence of Wadi Ar Ribiyyah with a branch or tributary wadi

In its upper and middle reaches, it forms a steep ravine that receives the waters of several small tributaries. In its lower reaches, already on the plain, there has been a large well since ancient times, the Tawi Ribiyyah, around which farms, agricultural holdings, and homes have expanded, forming the current village of Ribiyyah (Arabic: الرِّيْبِيَّة), whose inhabitants retain a close connection with the mountain village of Slai Al-Ghalib.

== Dams and Reservoirs ==
Like other regions of the UAE, the geographical area of Wadi Ar Ribiyyah has occasionally been affected by unusually heavy rains and flooding, but so far no dams have been built on its channel.

== Toponymy ==
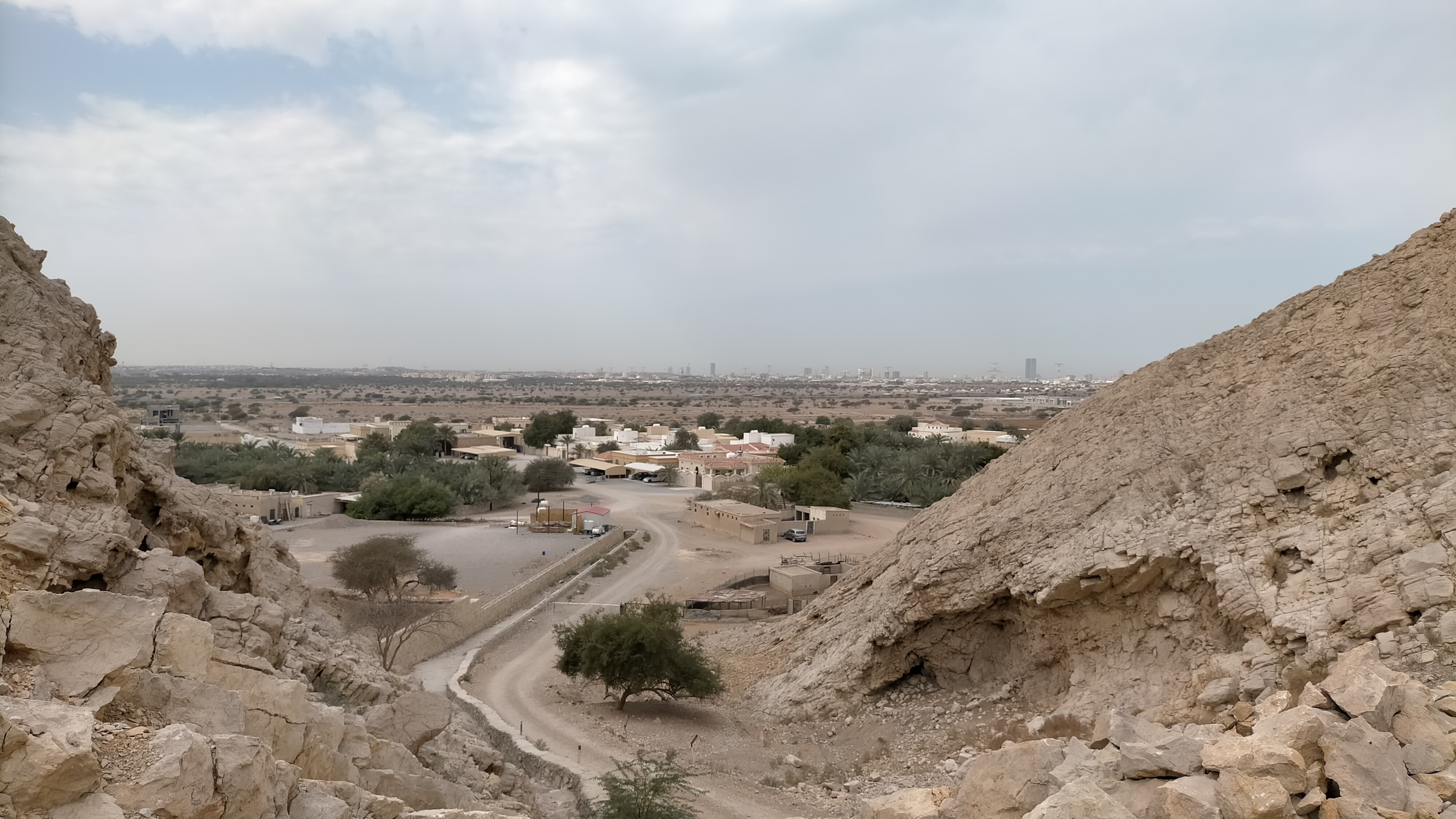
View of Ribiyyah village. In the background, Ras Al Khaimah city

Alternative names: Wādī Ar Rе̄biyyah, Wadi Ar Rebiyyah, Wadi Ar-Ribiyyah, Wadi Raibiya, Wadi Raybiyah, Wadi Rabiya, Wadi Rabaiya.

The name of Wadi Ar Ribiyyah (spelled as Wadi Raibiya), its tributaries, mountains, and nearby towns have been recorded in the documentation and maps drawn up between 1950 and 1960 by the British Arabist, cartographer, military officer, and diplomat Julian F. Walker, during the work carried out to establish borders between the then called Trucial States, later completed by the UK Ministry of Defence, with 1:100,000 scale maps published from 1971 onwards.

It appears in the National Atlas of the United Arab Emirates with the spelling Wādī Ar Rе̄biyyah.

== Population ==
The Wadi Ar Ribiyyah area was populated mainly by the Habus tribe, sections of Bani Idaid and Bani Zidah, although it had previously belonged to the Qiyaishi, of the Shihuh Bani Shatair tribal section.

== See also ==
- List of wadis of the United Arab Emirates
- List of mountains in the United Arab Emirates
- List of wadis of Oman
- List of mountains in Oman
