= Wadi Halu =

Wadi Halu Wādī Halū
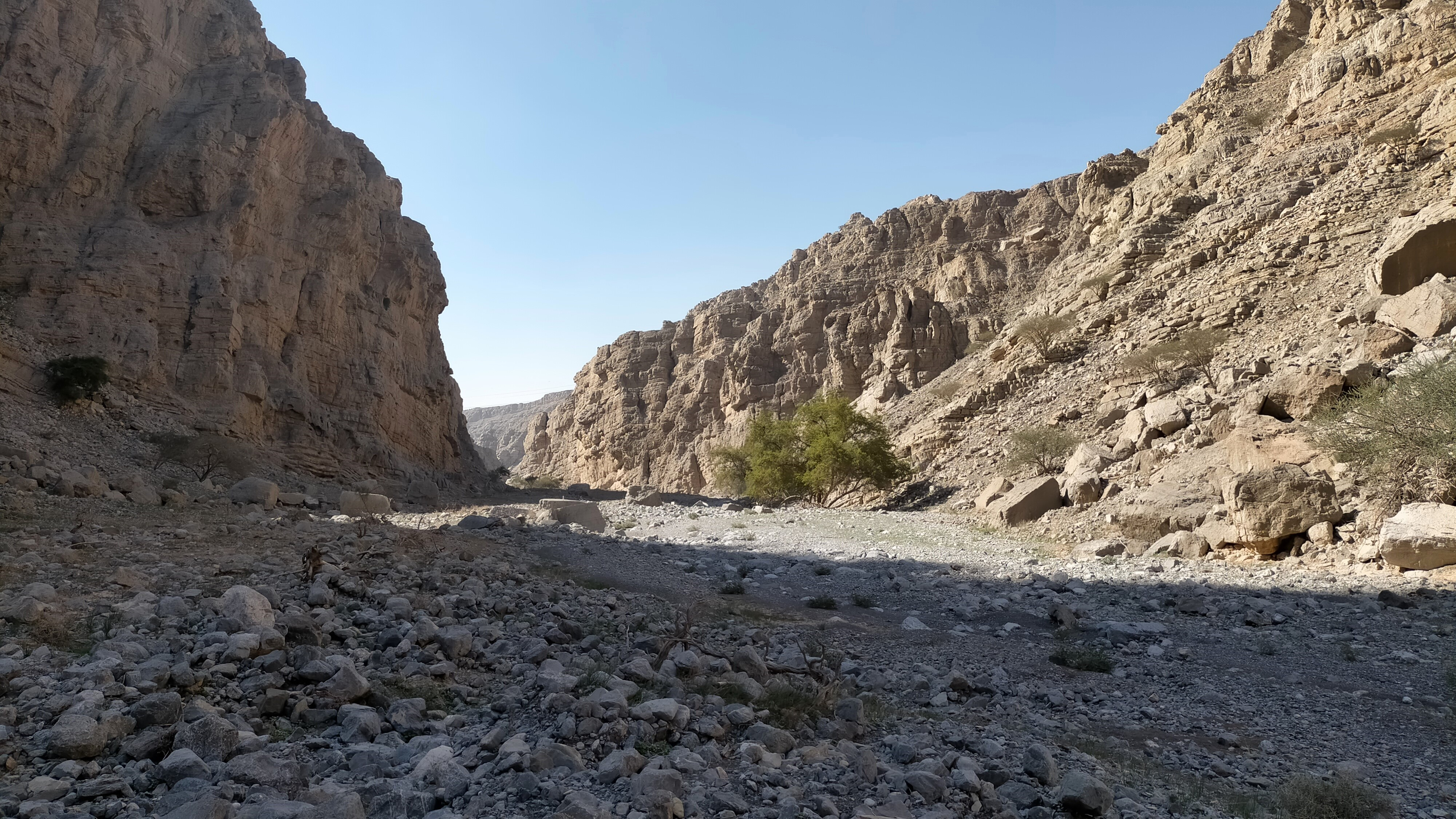
- Wadi Halu - middle course

- Location within United Arab Emirates Location within Persian Gulf Location within West and Central Asia
- Native name: وادي حالو (Arabic)

Location
- Country: United Arab Emirates
- Emirate: Ras Al Khaimah

Physical characteristics
- Source: South slope of Jabal Sal (778 m (2,552 ft)), UAE.
  - elevation: 582 m (1,909 ft)
- Mouth: In the Wadi Naqab, in a residential area of the village of Saih Al Hurf.
  - coordinates: 25°41′58.4″N 56°02′59.6″E
  - elevation: 84 m (276 ft)
- Length: 7.9 km (4.9 mi)
- Basin size: 16.9 km^{2} (6.5 mi^{2})

Basin features
- River system: Wadi Naqab
- Tributaries
  - right: Wadi Sal

Wadi Halu (Arabic: وادي حالو, romanized: Wādī Halū), is a dry valley or river with ephemeral or intermittent flow, which flows almost exclusively during the rainy season, located in the northeast of the United Arab Emirates, in the Emirate of Ras Al Khaimah.

It belongs to the drainage basin of the Wadi Naqab (107 km^{2} (41 mi^{2})), of which it is a tributary on the right, and extends through a small drainage sub-basin of 16.9 km^{2} (6.5 mi^{2}), which limits to the north and east with that of the Wadi Qada'ah; to the south with that of the Wadi Muhayli and minor ravines tributaries of the Wadi Naqab; and to the west with that of the Wadi Al Midhnab and smaller ravines, also tributaries of the Wadi Naqab.

The narrowness of this drainage sub-basin in its southern half means that a very important part of its flow is received from the contributions of its main tributary, the Wadi Sal, which together with its own tributaries occupies almost the entire surface of the north of the sub-basin, and collects the waters of the southern slope of the Jabal Sal (778 m (2,552 ft)).

== Course ==
The source of the main channel of Wadi Halu is located approximately 1.75 km (1.09 mi) south of the summit of Jabal Sal, and southwest of the village and farming area of Sal.

Although in hydrology, when two rivers join it is customary to consider the one of lesser importance as tributary, there are numerous rivers in which the tributary provides a greater flow, or has a greater length or surface area of its drainage basin than the main river. For example, the case of the Mississippi River is well known, whose tributary (the Missouri River) is, upstream of the confluence, 600 km (370 mi) longer and has a basin three times as extensive.

In a much more modest dimension, it is something similar to what happens between Wadi Halu and Wadi Sal.

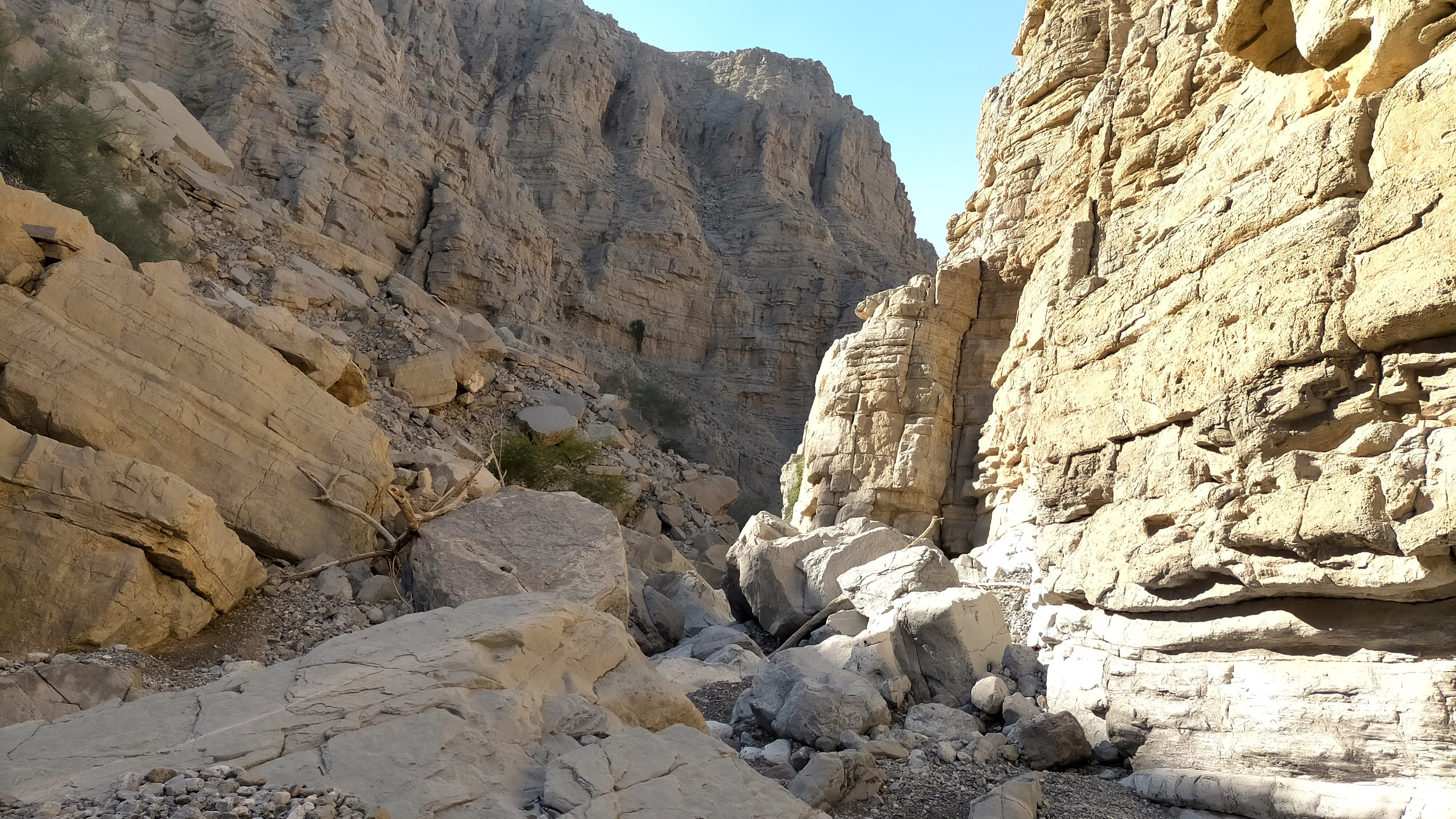
Small canyon of the Wadi Halu, a tributary of the Wadi Naqab

1.4 km (0.87 mi) from its headwaters, the Wadi Halu receives from the right the waters of its tributary the Wadi Sal, whose main course describes an arc 5.8 km (3.6 mi) long, from east to west, starting at its head. birth next to the village of Al Yafnah, also passing through the villages and extensive areas of cultivation on terraces or terraces, of Sal, Al Miʻli , and through the south of Deira Sabah.

The waters of multiple small sub-tributaries and secondary ravines or ravines that start from the southern slope of Jabal Sal end up in this main course of the Wadi Sal, which at its summit has a small plateau, cut by high cliffs facing north, and a slight inclination towards the south, which facilitates runoff through the drainage network, towards said sub-basin.

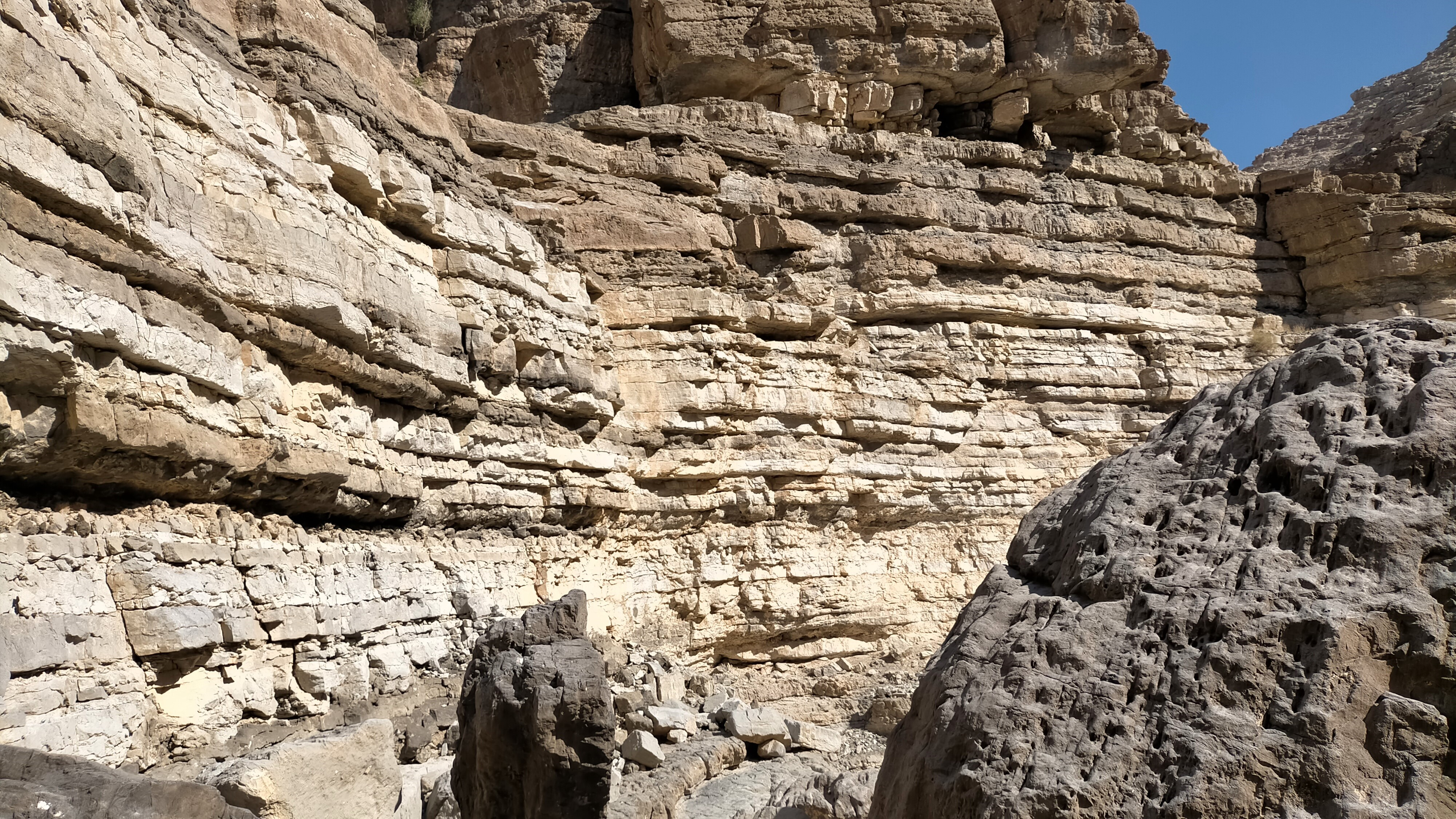
Wadi Halu Dry Falls. Dry waterfall of Wadi Halu. Great wall of about 70 m, through which, when it carries water, the wadi flows forming a waterfall

From the point of confluence of the Wadi Sal, the main channel of the Wadi Halu increases its flow and descends vigorously, generating – 900 m (3,000 ft) further down – a large dry waterfall, known as Wadi Halu Dry Falls, which in some points reaches a height of 70 m (230 ft), followed by a small canyon.

Almost at the end of its middle course, the Wadi Halu channel is partially obstructed by the collapse of large rocks from its left side, which has generated the deposit of earth, mud and other sediments, in the area immediately before the plug, forming a small flat and fertile space, used in the past for agricultural uses.

The lower course of the Wadi Halu receives the contribution of several small tributaries from the left, and has a very low gradient, with a bed formed almost exclusively by pebbles and other small and medium-sized boulders. There are very few trees, and in general the vegetation is scarce: only the usual Samra or Samar Tree (Acacia tortilis), with very thorny branches, and some jujubes (jujubes / سدر / Sidr tree - Ziziphus spina-christi), species also very common in the Hajar Mountains.

In the last kilometers, before its mouth into the Wadi Naqab, next to a residential area of the town of Saih Al Hurf, the sides of the wadi are formed mainly by sedimentary materials that have been accumulating for thousands of years and have been eroded by the sporadic avenues, offering a kind of canal, with walls that rarely exceed 10 m (33 ft) in height, and have numerous cavities, similar to those that can be found in other wadis of similar morphology, used in the past, among other uses, as rudimentary refrigerators.

Many of these cavities still conserve a part of the primitive dry stone walls used to provide privacy, protect the rooms from the elements, and maintain a cool temperature to preserve food.

== Floods ==
The Wadi Halu is considered one of the most prominent tributaries of the Wadi Naqab, and its significant flow in the rainy season, together with that of the main wadi, has caused flooding and extensive damage in the nearby residential areas of Al Fahlain and Al-Hail.

To address this problem, in 2020, a reservoir or rainwater storage well was built one kilometer downstream from its mouth, with an area of 100,000 square meters and a depth of 20 m (66 ft), with a capacity of two million cubic meters.

== Toponymy ==
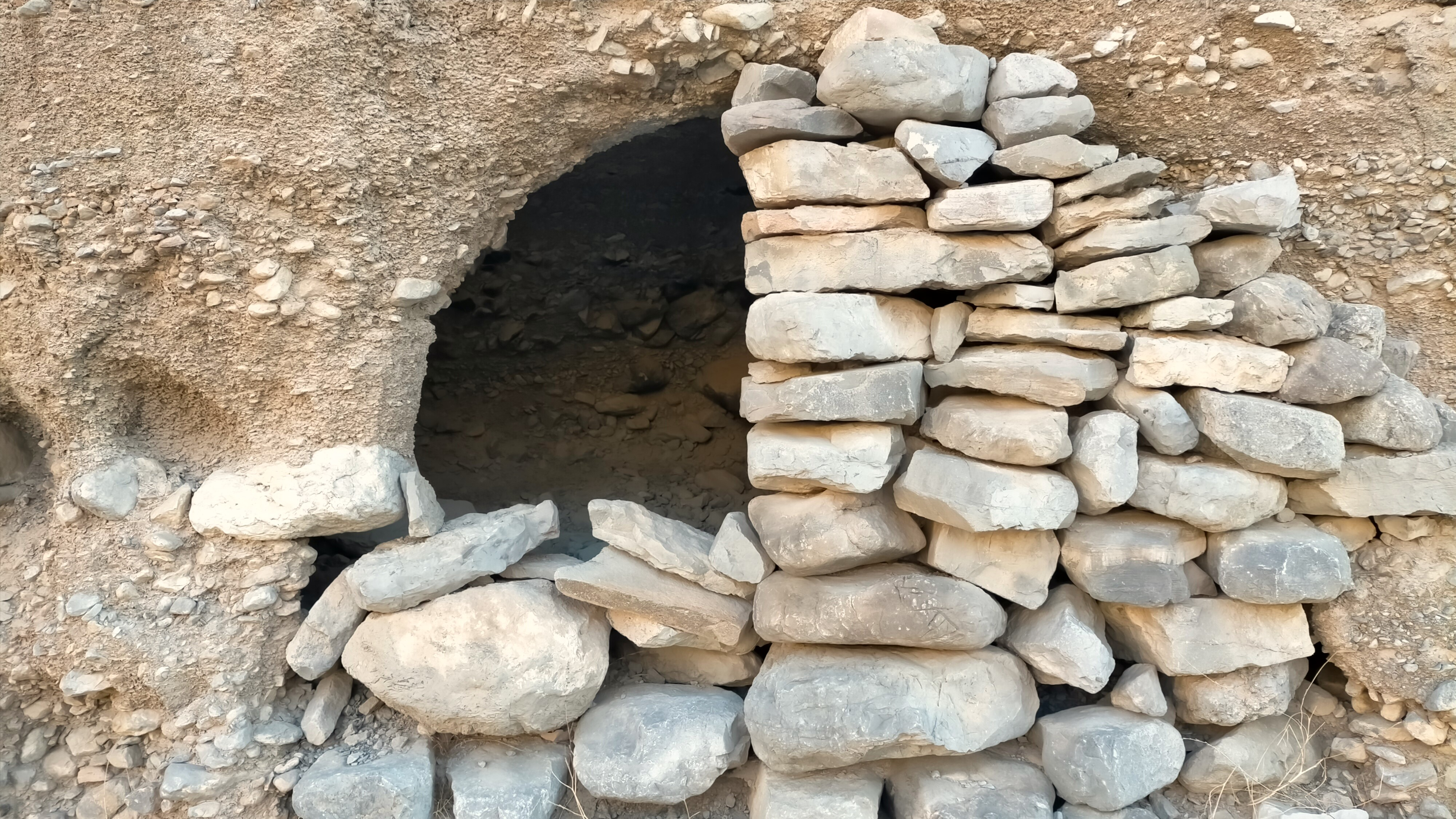
Wadi Halu - Wadi Halu - Cavities partially closed with dry stone

Alternative names: Wadi Halu, Wādī Halu, Wādī Halū, Wadi Khalu, Wadi Khallu, Wadi Khalo, Wadi Al-Khalo.

The names of this wadi and its tributaries were recorded in the documentation and maps prepared between 1950 and 1960 by the British Arabist, cartographer, military officer and diplomat Julian F. Walker, during the work carried out to establish borders between the then called Trucial States, later completed by the United Kingdom Ministry of Defence, on 1:100,000 scale maps published in 1971.

== Population ==
The entire area near the Wadi Halu and its tributaries and sub-tributaries, although initially populated by the Naqbiyin tribe (in Arabic: النقبي), also called Naqabi or Al-Naqabi (from which the name of the wadi comes), was occupied by from approximately 1800, by the Habus tribe, distributed, among other territories, between the tribal areas of Bani Idaid, Bani Haraimish, and Bani Salimi.

== See also ==
- List of wadis of the United Arab Emirates
- List of mountains in the United Arab Emirates
- List of wadis of Oman
- List of mountains in Oman
