= Wadi Madnan =

Wadi in UAE

Wadi Madnan Wādī Midnān
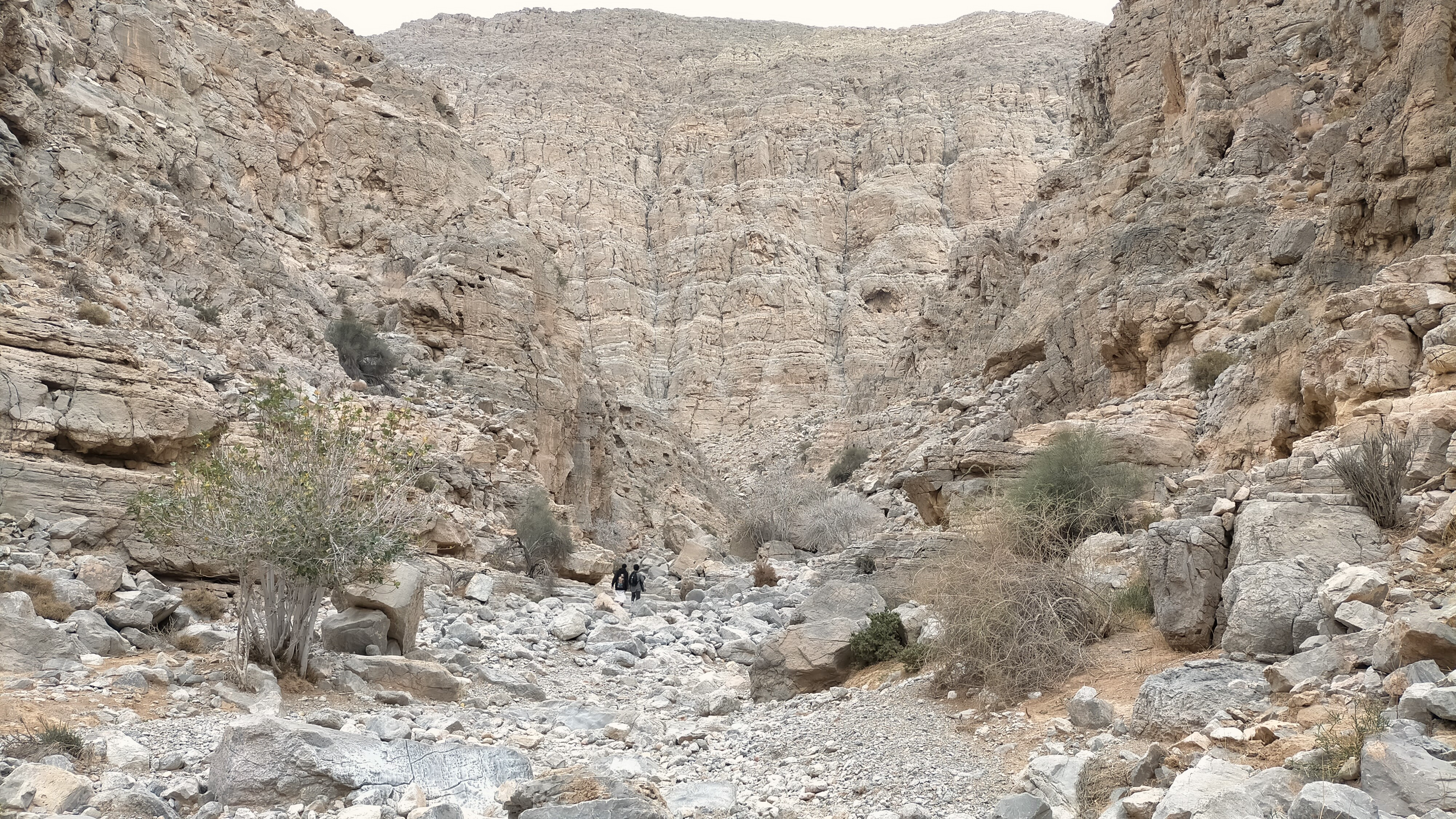

- Location within United Arab Emirates Location within Persian Gulf Location within West and Central Asia
- Native name: وادي مدنان (Arabic)

Location
- Country: United Arab Emirates
- Emirate: Fujairah; Ras al-Khaimah

Physical characteristics
- Source: Northeast slope of Jabal Yibir (1,527 m (5,010 ft))
  - elevation: 1,430 m (4,690 ft), approximately
- Mouth: Confluence with Wadi Naqab
  - coordinates: 25°42′48″N 56°06′51″E
  - elevation: 211 m (692 ft)
- Length: 10.4 km (6.5 mi)
- Basin size: 107 km^{2} (41 mi^{2})

Basin features
- Progression: Wadi. Intermittent flow
- River system: Wadi Naqab
- Tributaries
  - right: Wadi Sharih, Wadi Samarat / Wadi Khalkhal

Wadi Madnan (Arabic: وادي مدنان, romanized: Wādī Midnān) is a valley or dry river, with ephemeral or intermittent flow, flowing almost exclusively during the rainy season, located in the east of the United Arab Emirates, in the emirates of Fujairah and Ras Al Khaimah.

It is a left tributary of the Wadi Naqab, to whose 107 km^{2} (41 mi^{2}) drainage basin it belongs, and which is bordered to the north by the Wadi Qada'ah basin,; to the west with that of Wadi Nahela; and to the south and east, with that of Wadi Tawiyean.

The entire Wadi Naqab basin, whose highest peak is Jabal Yibir (1,527 m (5,010 ft)), brings together approximately 91 independent streams, most of them without known names, all classified into five grades or levels according to the Horton-Strahler numbering. Of these, the main one, due to its length and flow rate, is the Wadi Madnan.

Among the main tributaries of the Wadi Madnan (sub-tributaries of the Wadi Naqab), the Wadi Sharih and Wadi Samarat (also known as Wadi Khalkhal) stand out.

== Course ==
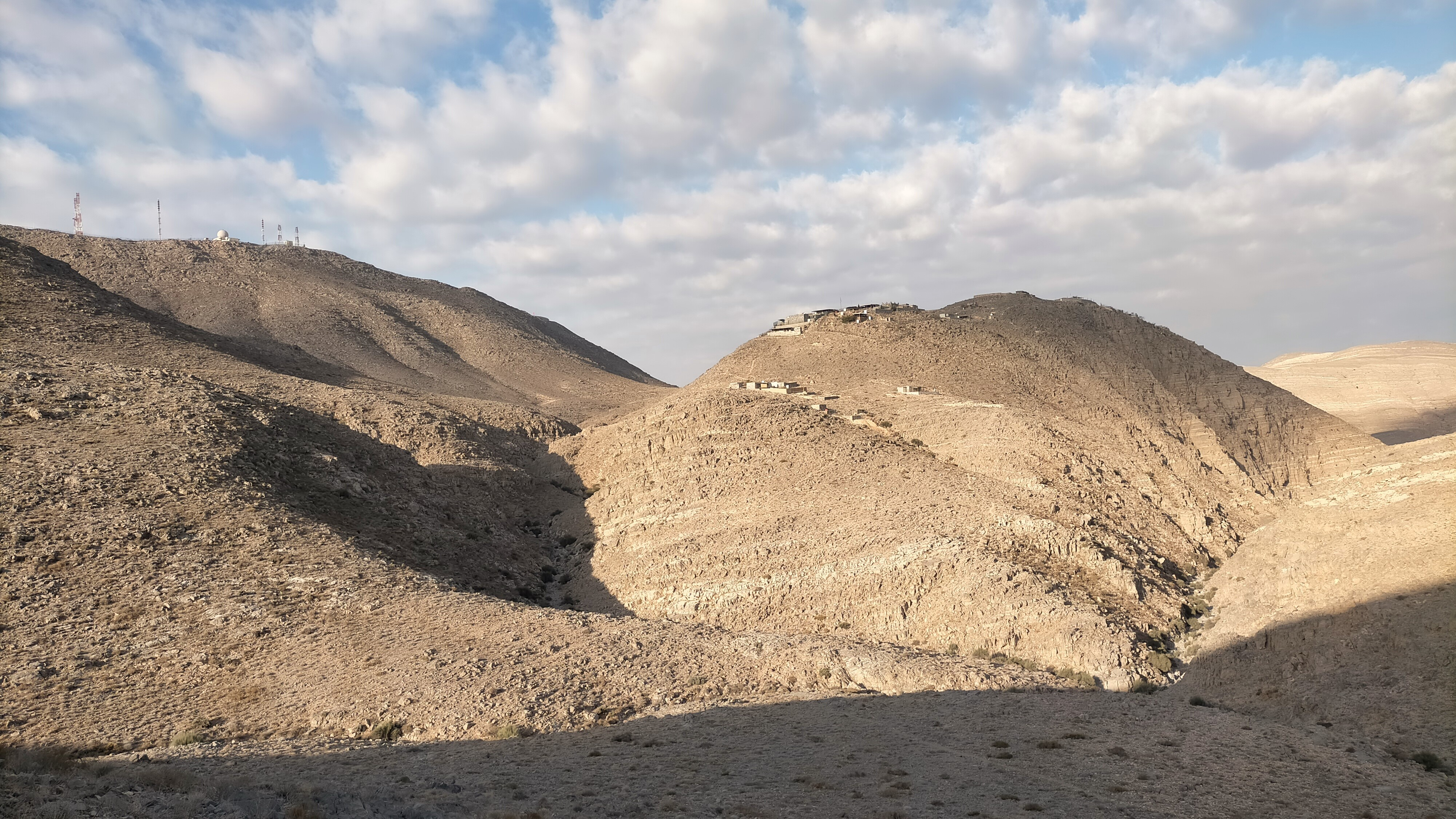
View of the ravine formed by the upper course of the Wadi Madnan, surrounding Jabal Dardur and the village of Dardur. To the left of the photo, with the antennas, is Jabal Yibir/Jabal Mebrah

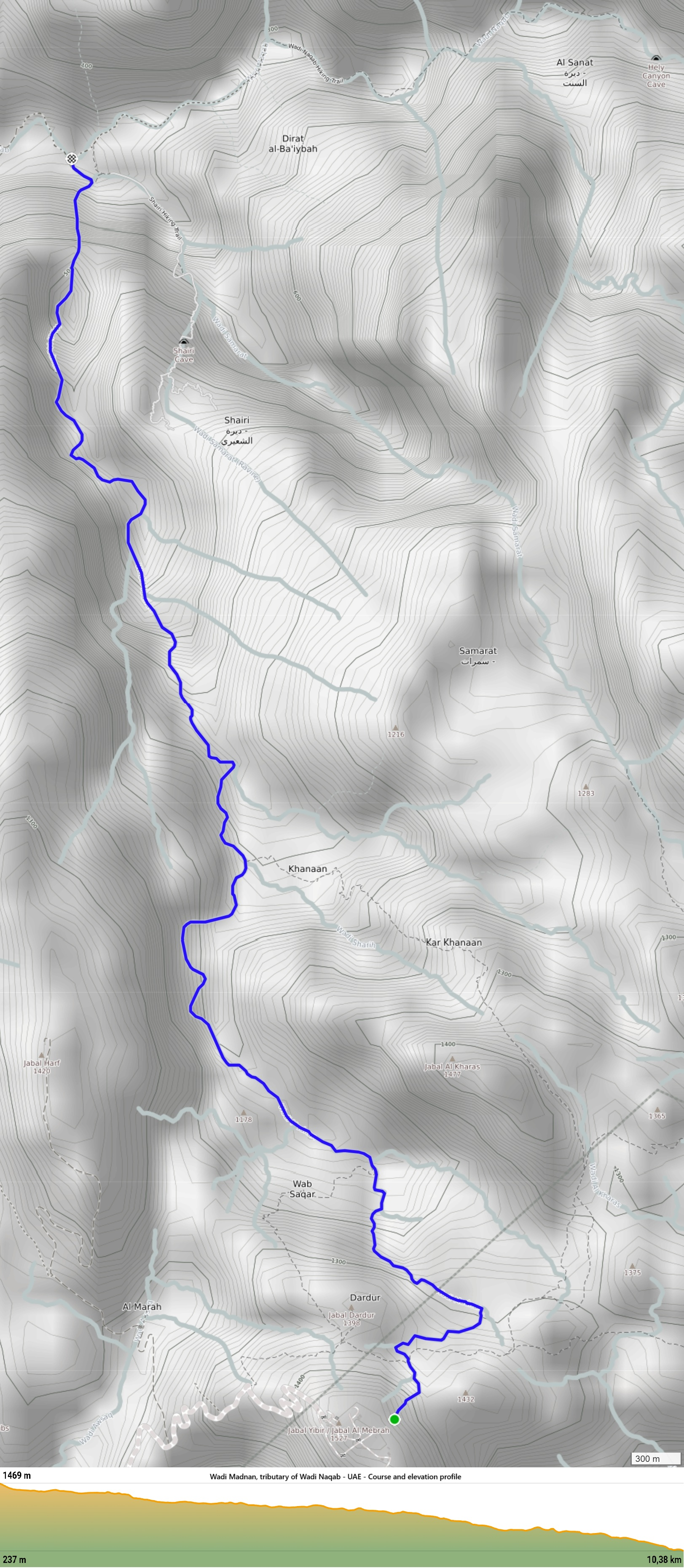
Graph of the course and elevation profile of Wadi Madnan

The total approximate length of Wadi Madnan is 10.4 km (6.5 mi). It flows from south to north, and its main source is located on the northeast slope of Jabal Yibir, at an altitude of approximately 1,430 m (4,690 ft).

In its upper course, about 2 km (1.2 mi) long, it surrounds Jabal Dardur (1,398 m (4,587 ft)) and the village of Dardur (Arabic: ديرة الدردور), which extends around its summit, forming a large ravine with abrupt and very steep sections.

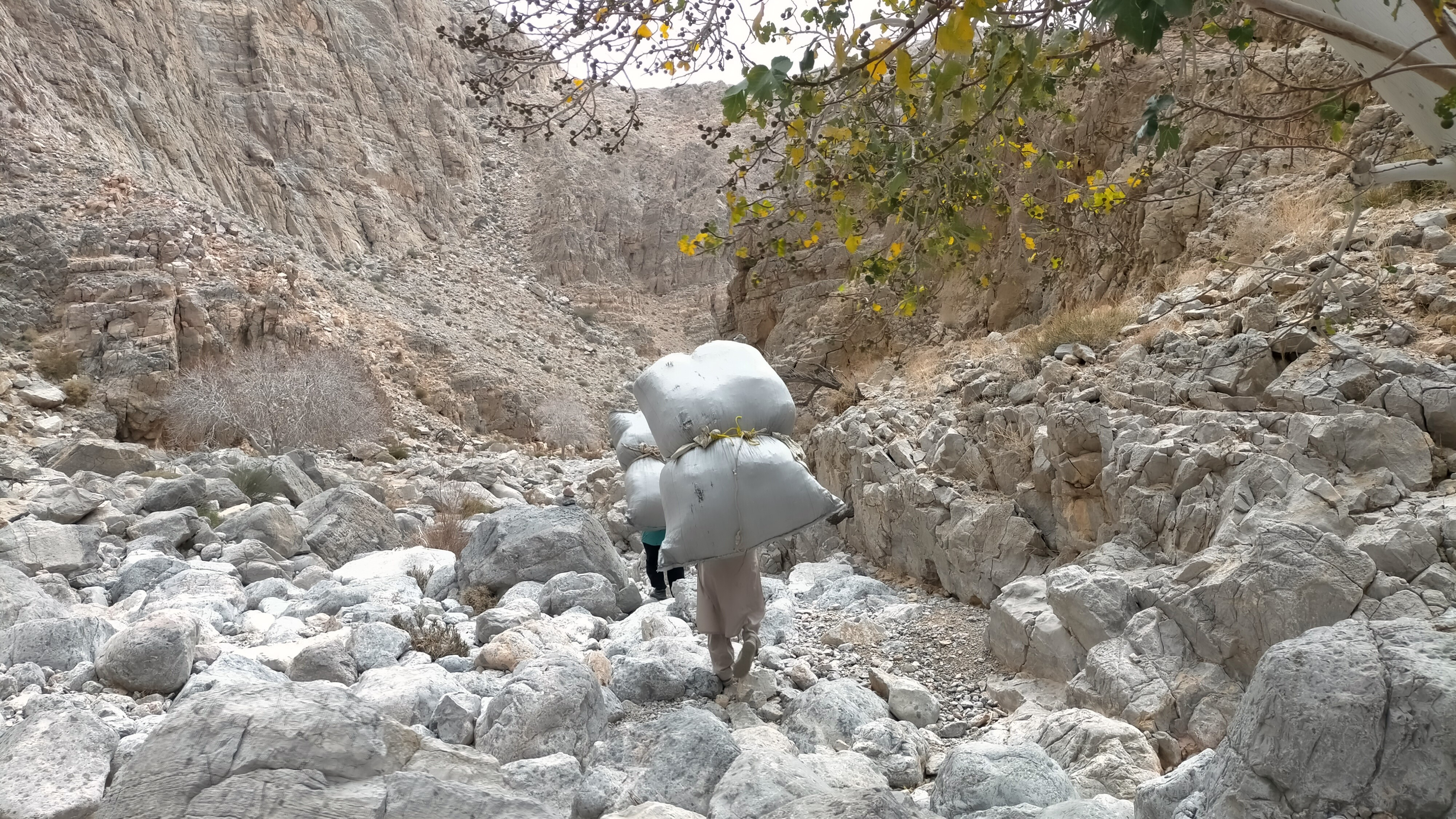
Transit of goods through the Wadi Madnan riverbed

At the beginning of its middle course, the wadi passes through the village of Wab Saqar (Arabic: واب صقر) and for the next 3 km (1.9 mi), until reaching the village of Khanaan (Arabic: خنان), it has a wide and deep channel, with high cliffs on its sides, but with a moderate slope that facilitates its use as a transit and communication route (on foot or with donkeys), between the small villages and cultivated areas of the area.

In the second half of its course, Wadi Madnan also has a very rugged channel, and past the village of Shairi it forms a large canyon, with several spectacular dry waterfalls, between 40 and 60 m (130 and 200 ft) high, only accessible with rock climbing techniques and equipment.

This area of waterfalls is known to enthusiasts of canyoning named Kirithon Canyon.

A few meters before its mouth in the Wadi Naqab, the Wadi Madnan receives on its right the confluence of the Wadi Samarat (Wādī Khalkhāl).

== Toponymy ==
Alternative names: Wadi Midnan, Wādī Midnān, Wādī Madnan.

The name of Wadi Madnan (with that same spelling), its tributaries, mountains, and nearby towns was recorded in the documentation and maps produced between 1950 and 1960 by the British Arabist, cartographer, military officer, and diplomat Julian F. Walker, during the work carried out to establish borders between the then called Trucial States, later completed by the UK Ministry of Defence, on 1:100,000 scale maps published in 1971.

In The National Atlas of the United Arab Emirates appears with the spelling Wādī Midnān (Arabic: وادي مدنان).

== Population ==
The entire area around Wadi Naqab, including its tributaries and sub-tributaries, although initially populated by the Naqbiyin tribe (Arabic: النقبي), also called Naqabi or Al-Naqabi (from which the wadi gets its name), was occupied from approximately 1800 by the Habus tribe, which extended, among other territories, through the tribal areas of Ahl Ghayl and Bani Hasan.

== See also ==
- List of wadis of the United Arab Emirates
- List of mountains in the United Arab Emirates
- List of wadis of Oman
- List of mountains in Oman
