= Jiri plain =

- Location within United Arab Emirates
- Coordinates: 25°27′31″N 56°0′56″E
- Country: United Arab Emirates
- Emirate: Sharjah Ras Al Khaimah Fujairah

The Jiri plain is an area of gravel plain extending across areas of Southern Ras Al Khaimah, Eastern Sharjah and Western Fujairah, United Arab Emirates (UAE). The area, some 15 miles in length and 8 miles in breadth, is triangulated with the villages of Khatt and Habhab to the North; Adhen to the East and Dhaid to the South. To the West the plain is enclosed by sand dunes.

The soil of the Jiri plain is darkened by debris brought down by seasonal waters from the mountains, which helps to define its rich, loamy character and high carbonate content (from the outwash of Cretaceous limestone). The plan is thickly populated by acacia (Acacia tortilis) and ghaf trees, as well as tamarisk and other hardy varieties. A number of deep aquifers run under the plain.

The settled population of the area at the time of Lorimer's 1908 Gazetteer of the Persian Gulf was some 1,000 strong, mostly members of the tribes of Awanat, Mazari, Naqbiyin, Sharqiyin (in the area of Wadi Ham) and some Zaab. The area was home to Bedouin of the Ghafalah, Bani Qitab and the Khawatir section of the Na'im, who had been pushed north by their rivals, the Bani Kaab.

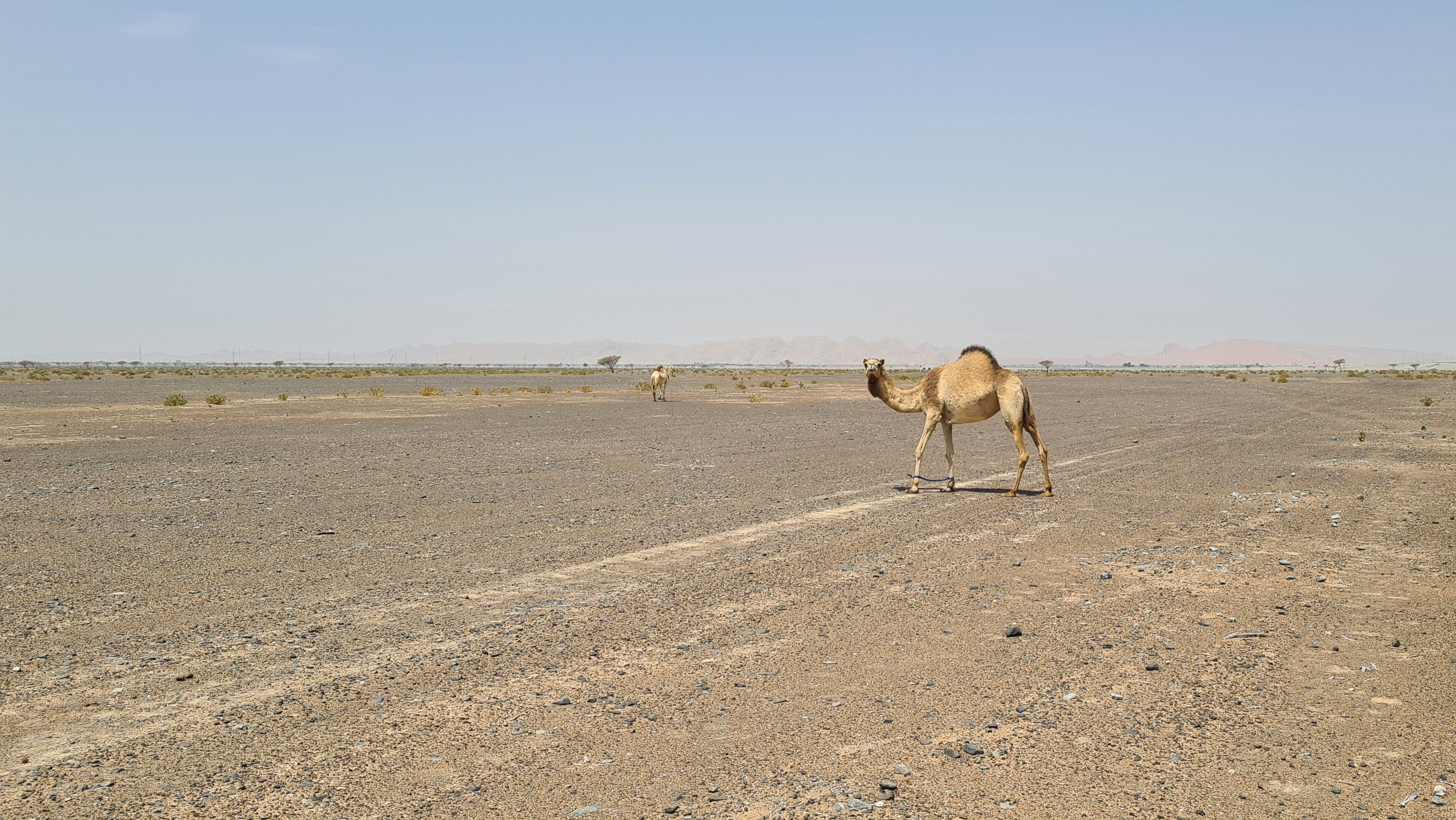
A hobbled camel grazing on the Jiri Plain near Mleiha in Sharjah, UAE.

The plain, together with that of Dhaid and Madam, contains some of the most fertile and productive land in the UAE.
