= Wadi Sal =

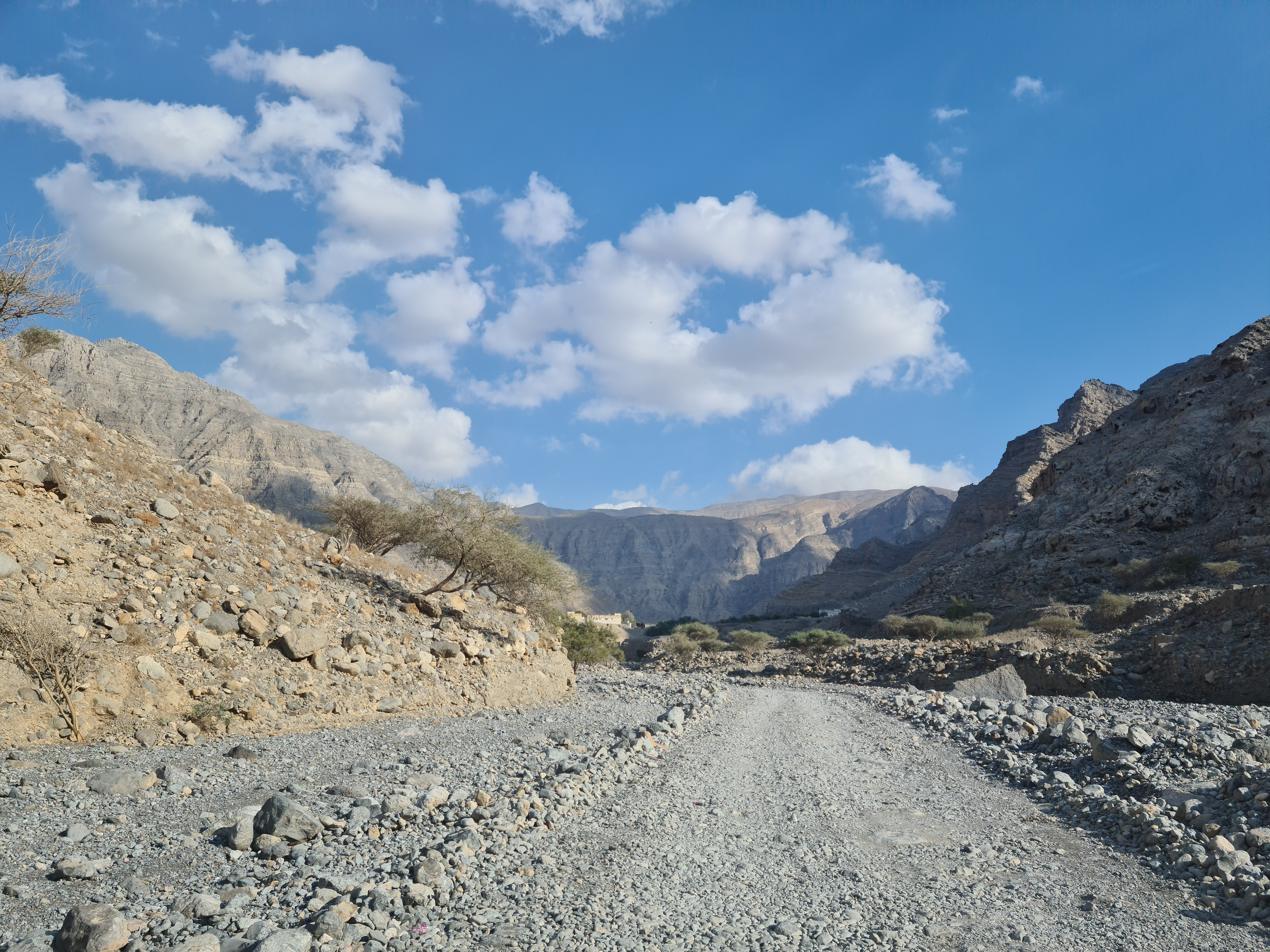

- Location within United Arab Emirates

Physical characteristics
- Mouth
  - coordinates: 25°46′51.7″N 56°03′52.6″E

Wadi Sal is a seasonal watercourse, or wadi, in the Hajar Mountains of Ras Al Khaimah, in the United Arab Emirates (UAE).

The wadi runs east to west, running down from the mountain village of Sal to join with the Wadi Bih at Burairat. It is a fertile agricultural area, long associated with the Habus tribe of Ras Al Khaimah. The wadi is accessed today from the Jebel Jais road.

It is a popular hiking and offroading destination. The steep climb out of the wadi leads up to the Habus village of Sal.

== See also ==
- List of wadis of the United Arab Emirates
