= Habus =

Bedouin tribe of the United Arab Emirates and Oman

- Arab tribe
- Ethnicity: Arab
- Location: United Arab Emirates, Oman
- Language: Arabic
- Religion: Islam
- Surnames: Al Habsi

The Habus (singular Al Habsi) is an Arab tribe of Ras Al Khaimah, in the United Arab Emirates (UAE), as well as a tribe throughout Oman. They mostly settled the area around Khatt, Fahlain and the Hajar Mountain wadis to the East of the city of Ras Al Khaimah. They are often associated with the Hajar Mountain tribes of the Shihuh and Dhahuriyiin, with whom the Habus were frequently neighbours and with whom the Habus shared a number of cultural similarities and traditions. The Habus speak the distinctive Shehhi dialect of Arabic, which is thought to have Himyarite Yemeni origins dating back to the second century BCE.

== Tribal areas ==
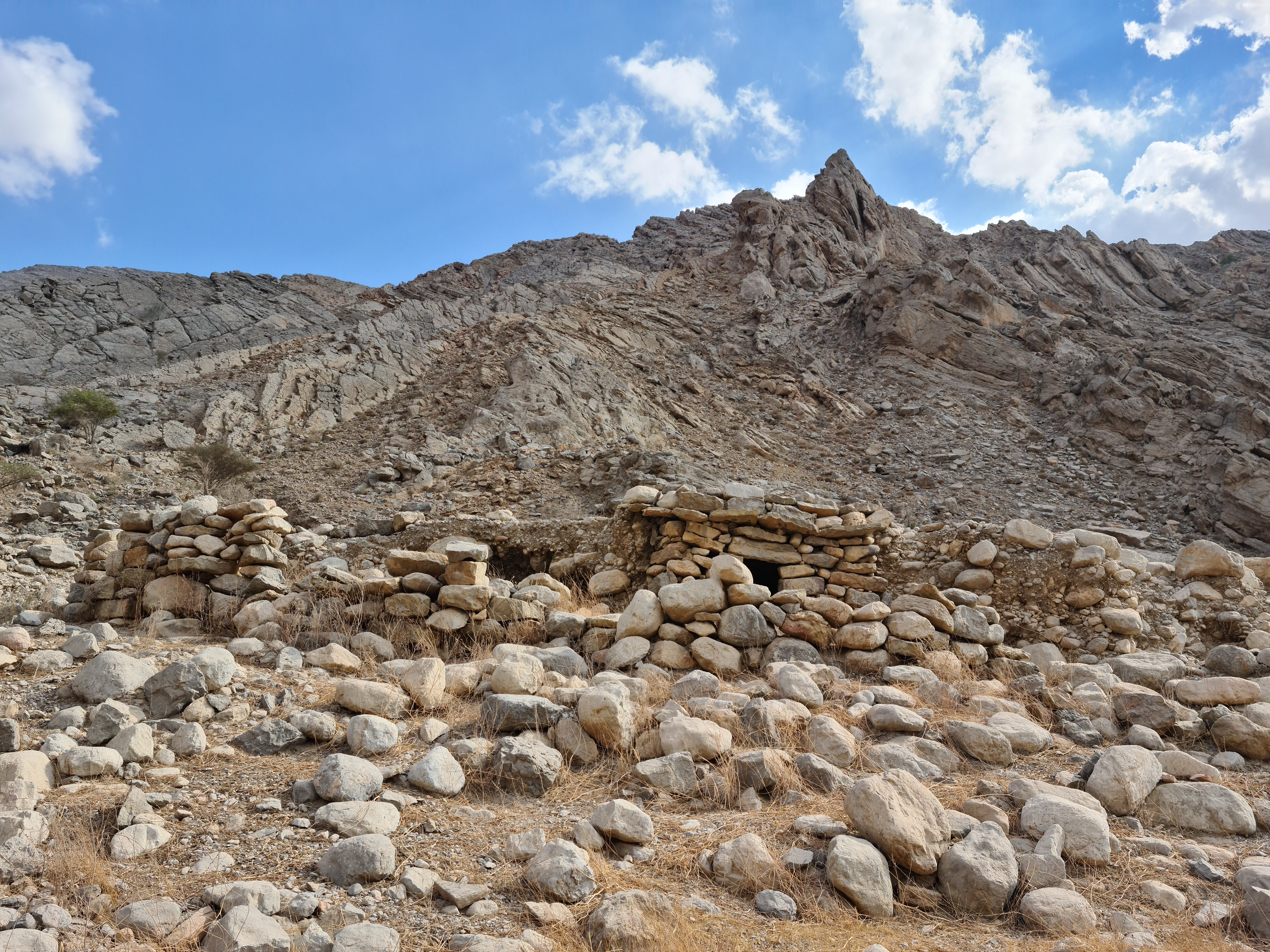
Abandoned settlements and farmland in the Wadi Naqab

While the territory to the north of Wadi Bih was traditionally Shihuh, the area to the south of the wadi is considered Habus. Intermarriage between the Shihuh and Habus was common, in particular between the Al Haramsha of the Bani Idaid Shihuh.

An agrarian people, cultivating extensive mountainous farmland in the wadis of the Hajar Mountains, the Habus settled and farmed the mountains of the Rus Al Jibal, particularly in the Wadi Naqab and Wadi Bih. Their name is said to be derived from the location of their original holdings of land on the Jebel Hibs, a mountain in Ras Al Khaimah.

The area around Wadi Naqab was traditionally held by members of the Naqbiyin tribe, from whom it derives its name, but was gradually bought up by members of the Habus tribe after the Naqbiyin fell foul of local rulers, likely pre-Qawasim (in the period 1695–1740) and many moved to Dibba and Khor Fakkan. By about 1800, Wadi Naqab was considered to be Habus territory. The Habus are also associated with the Wadi Sal.

Fiercely independent, the Habus successfully resisted an abortive attempt to impose taxation on them by the Ruler of Ras Al Khaimah, Sheikh Sultan bin Salim Al Qasimi. An uneasy peace was made between the Habus Sheikh of the time, Hamdan bin Malik and Sultan bin Salim, with an agreement between them copied out and lodged with each party. On his death, Hamdan bin Malik left his copy to be lodged with Sultan Qaboos of Oman.

=== Oil exploration and sovereignty ===
In 1951, the Wali of Bukha, Sayyid Badr bin Said, led a delegation to Julian Walker, the British Political Officer for the Trucial States, asserting that the areas of Sha'am, Rams and Khatt were Omani territory as the Shihuh and Habus of the area referred disputes to the Sheikh of Bukha. Walker strongly denied the claim, but fighting broke out in Sha'am and the Habus agreed to accept Ras Al Khaimah rule if Sheikh Saqr bin Mohammed Al Qasimi ensured a strong agent to uphold justice in the area.

The Habus allowed a party of surveyors and engineers from Petroleum Development Trucial Coast into their dar or tribal area in 1952, but on the advice of the Sheikh of Bukha denied a second visit. The dispute was resolved when the Habus finally recognised Al Qasimi sovereignty in 1955. However, they continued to be troublesome subjects even into 1963, when they held up a party from the Ras Al Khaimah mineral survey in a protest against Sheikh Saqr and even made an attempt to assert independence.

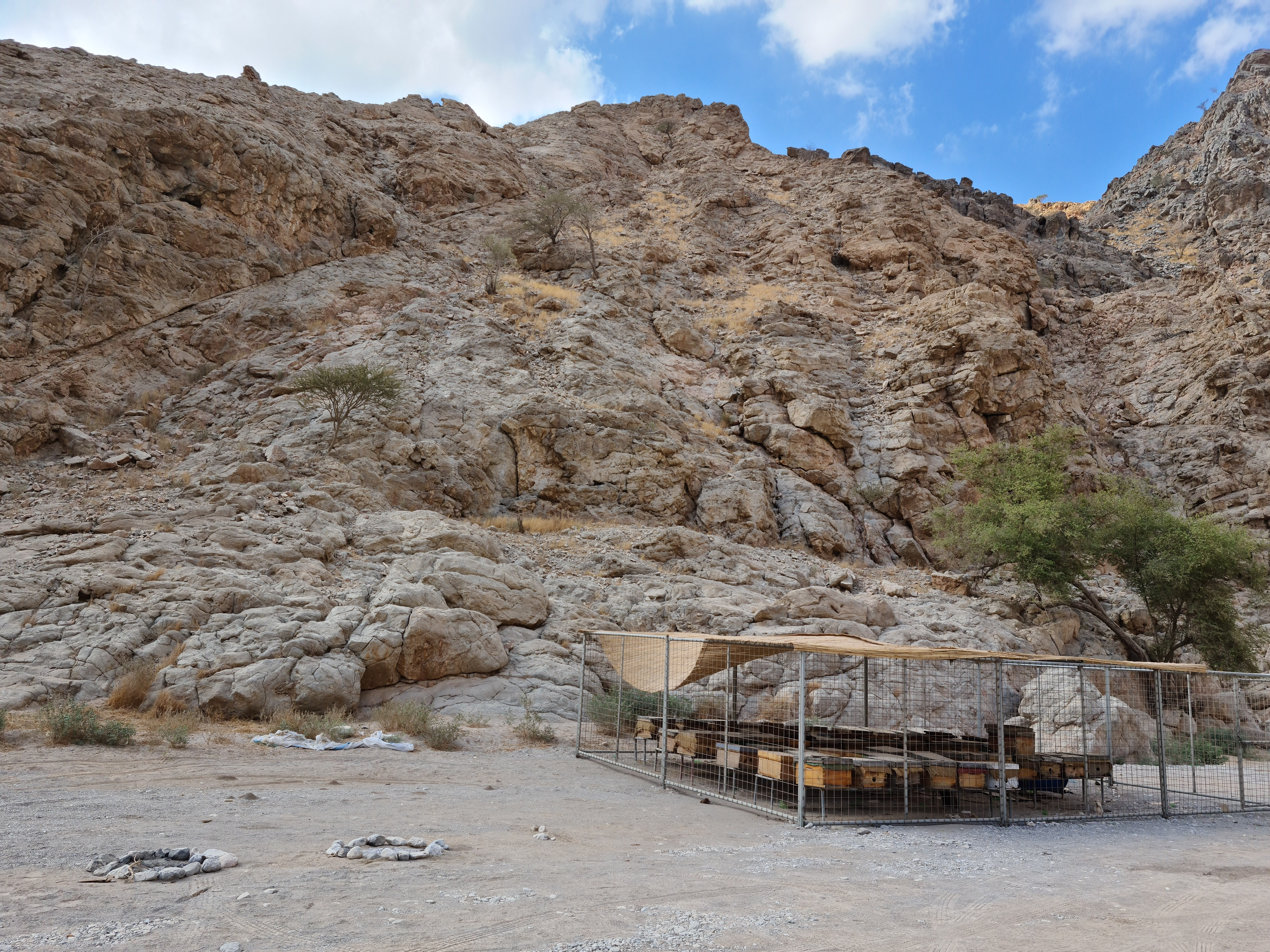
Honey bees in the Wadi Naqab. Beekeeping was a traditional and lucrative pastime for the Habus, who would trade the honey in Ras Al Khaimah.

=== Agriculture ===
The Wadi Naqab was long an agriculturally rich area, home to hundreds of fields in its upper reaches. Cultivating wheat and dates, the Habus traded wheat, honey, live goats, dairy products such as ghee (clarified butter) and firewood in Ras Al Khaimah town, buying metal tools, coffee, salt and clothing.

A number of date plantations in the fertile area around the village of Khatt were also bought by the Habus, particularly in the 1950s and 1960s. As well as outright acquiring plantations, the tribe also rented trees and forward-bought harvests of plantations.

Although many mountain farms and settlements of the Habus are now abandoned, a number of younger members of the tribe are now returning to build summer houses on their family lands. A Habus tribal festival, established in 2010, showcases the traditions and heritage of the tribe, including handcrafts and perfumery.
