= Khatt =

Khatt خت
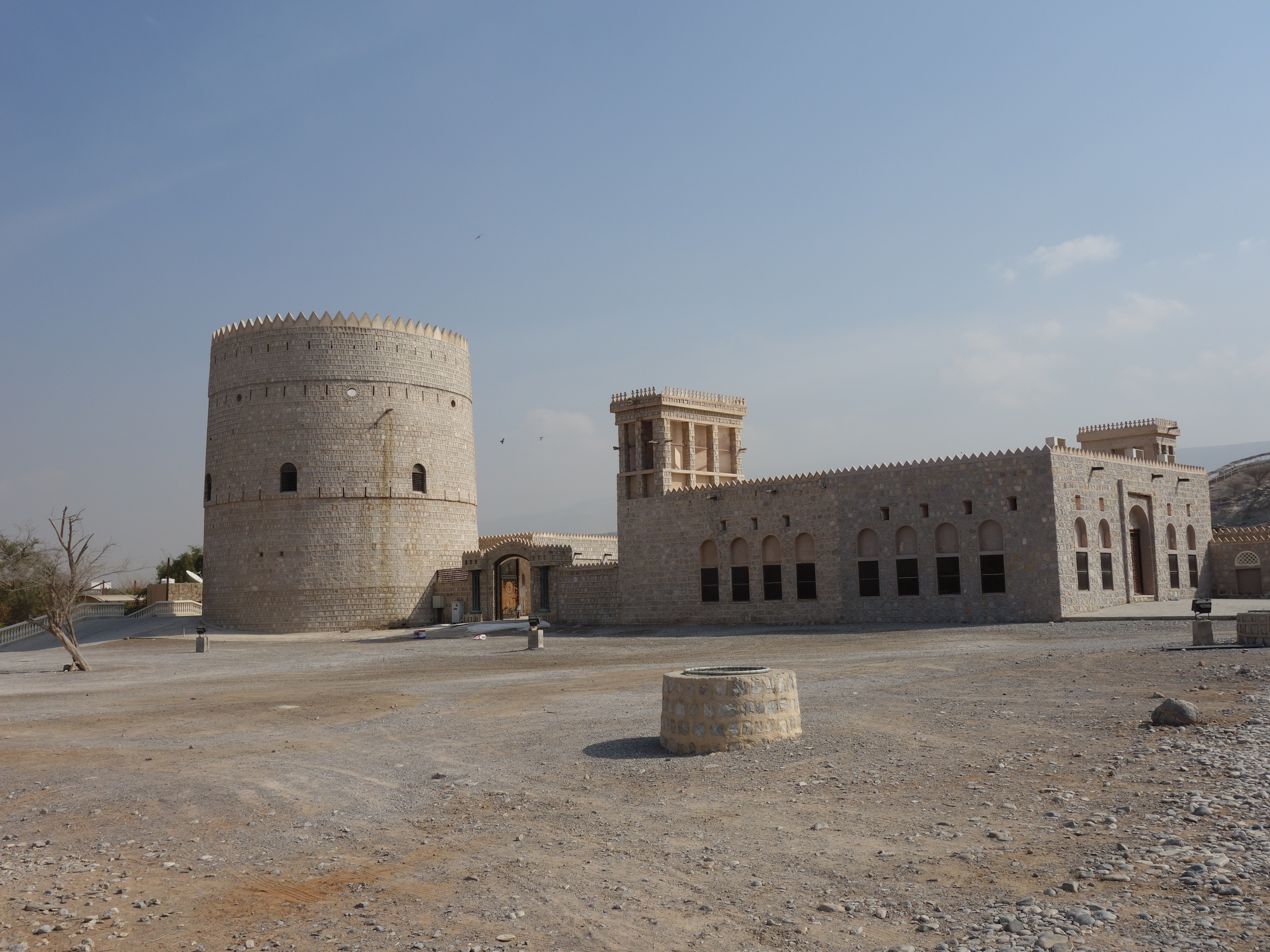

- Location within United Arab Emirates
- Coordinates: 25°37′27″N 56°01′0″E
- Country: United Arab Emirates
- Emirate: Ras Al Khaimah
- Elevation: 629 m (2,064 ft)

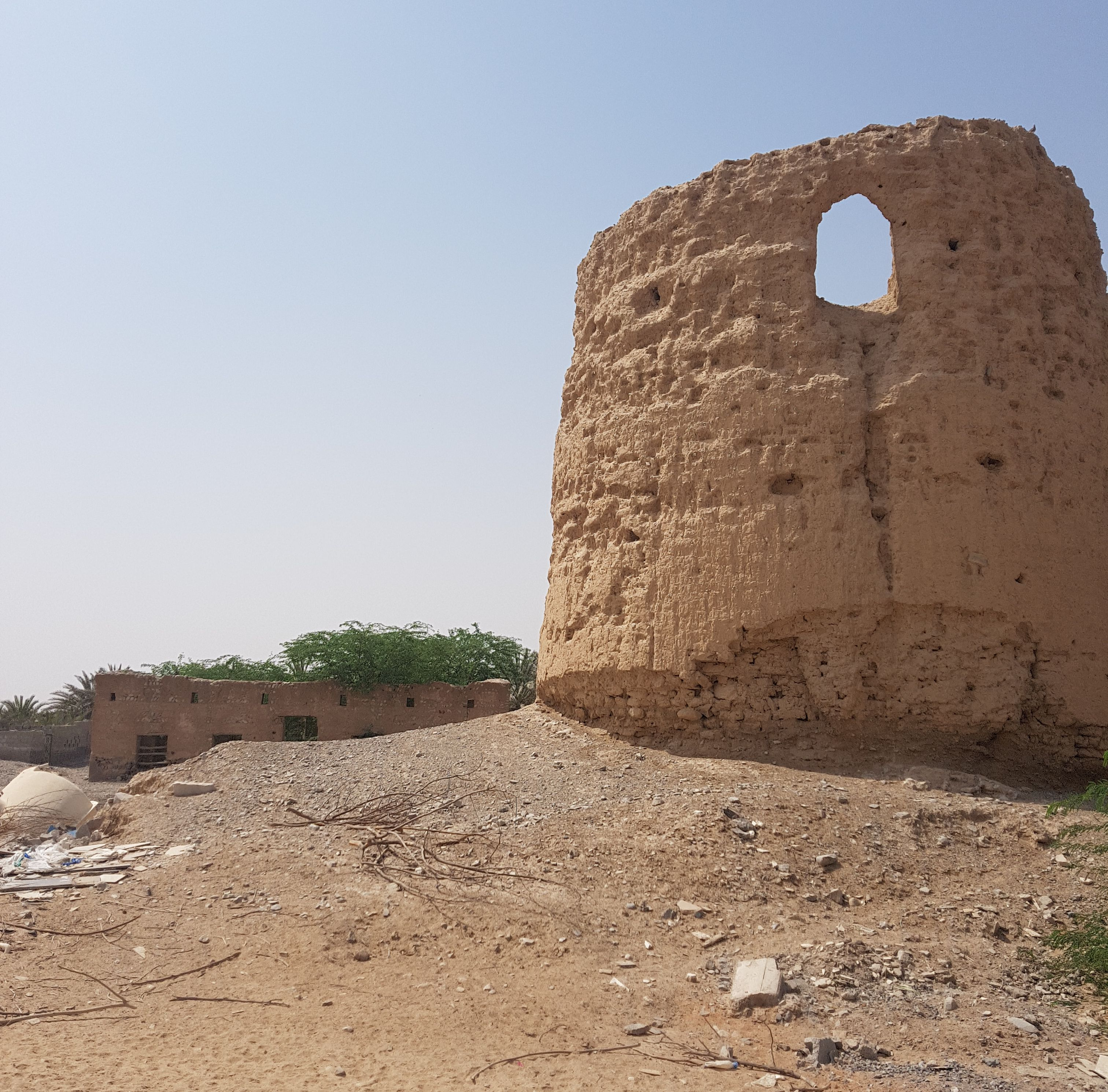
Mud brick watchtower at Khatt, Ras Al Khaimah

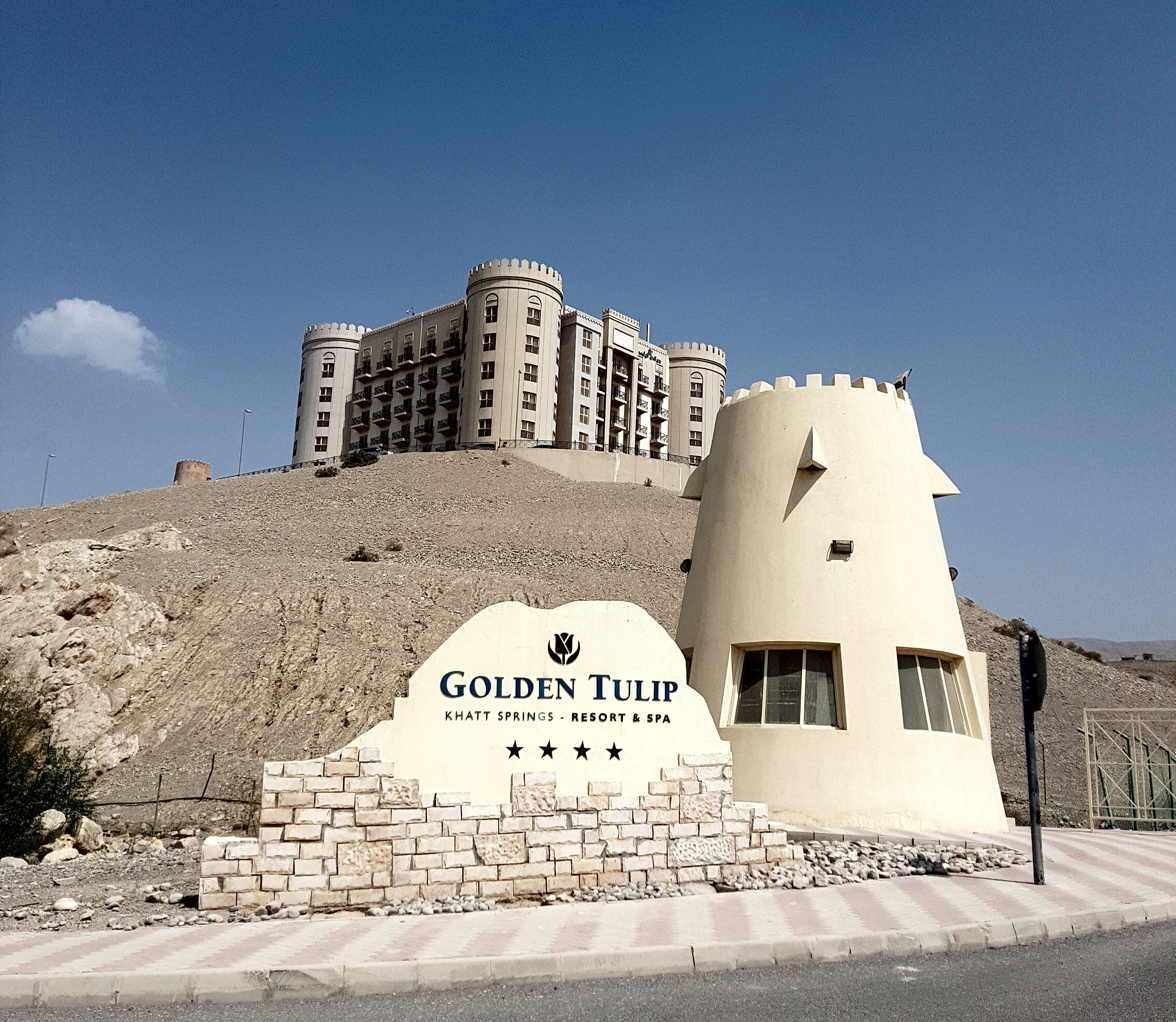
The Golden Tulip Hotel and Spa at Khatt

Khatt (Arabic: خت) is a mountainous village south-east of the city of Ras Al Khaimah, United Arab Emirates. Famous for its hot springs, there is evidence that Khatt has been a site of constant human settlement since the stone age – a record of over 5,000 years of occupation.

== History ==
Surveys carried out by a team from the Durham University in the early 1990s showed evidence of Ubaid Period stone age occupation (knapped flint), as well as a collection of 16 Hafit period corbelled stone beehive tombs. Umm Al-Nar period burials were also uncovered, as well as evidence of Wadi Suq pottery. The discovery of red-ridged Barbar Ware speaks of trade with 'Dilmum', or Bahrain, during the transitional period between the end of the Umm Al-Nar period and the ensuing Wadi Suq period.

Evidence has also been found at Khatt of Sasanian occupation and pottery, and - contemporaneous with the nearby port and settlement of Julphar - Chinese blue and white porcelain dating to between the sixteenth and eighteenth centuries.

=== Al Qasimi Rule ===
Khatt was an Al Qasimi settlement, populated in the main by members of the Naqbiyin, 'Awanat and Sharqiyin tribes – today the Al Naqbi Tower still stands in the village. Dominating the population, the settlement of the Naqbiyin is said to have taken place over a period of 300 years.

The Sheikh of Khatt was a signatory to the General Maritime Treaty of 1820 with the British. The treaty was issued in triplicate and signed at mid-day on 8 January 1820 in Ras Al Khaimah by Major-General William Keir Grant together with Sheikh Hassan Bin Rahman. Hassan was styled "Sheikh of Hatt and Falna" (Hatt being modern day Khatt) because he had ceded Ras Al Khaimah town to the British for use as a garrison town. Other tribal Sheikhs of the Omani coast signed soon after.

The maritime peace notwithstanding, Khatt was subject to the occasional depredations of bedouin from the interior and, in 1888, a feud between the people of Ras Al Khaimah and the mountain-dwelling Shihuh tribe resulted in several townspeople being murdered and over 200 date palms in Khatt being destroyed.

Lorimer noted, in 1908, 100 houses and 20,000 palm trees at Khatt.

== Springs ==
The sulphurous waters of Khatt Springs attain a depth of 90 feet, with a constant temperature of some 40 °C. Due to its mineral content and heat, the water is said to have medicinal benefits soothing skin ailments, rheumatic diseases and muscular problems. The waters rise from limestone bedrock. A total of three springs rise at the site, which has been developed to include a spa hotel managed by French operator Golden Tulip and offering a range of treatments.
