= Naqbiyin =

Bedouin tribe of the United Arab Emirates

Naqbiyin النقبي
- Arab tribe
- Ethnicity: Arab
- Location: United Arab Emirates
- Language: Arabic
- Religion: Islam

The Naqbiyin (Arabic: النقبي, singular Al Naqbi) is a tribe of the United Arab Emirates (UAE). They are mostly settled within the emirates of Sharjah and Ras Al Khaimah and have long been influential in the tribal politics of both emirates.

By the turn of the 20th century, the Naqbiyin had mostly settled in the emirate of Sharjah and were to be found in Khor Fakkan, Kalba as well as Dibba and Fahlain (today a suburb of Ras Al Khaimah). They had also settled at Khatt and Daftah in the Wadi Ham. Altogether, the settled population at that time was mostly involved in agriculture and numbered some 1,800 people.

== Ras Al Khaimah ==
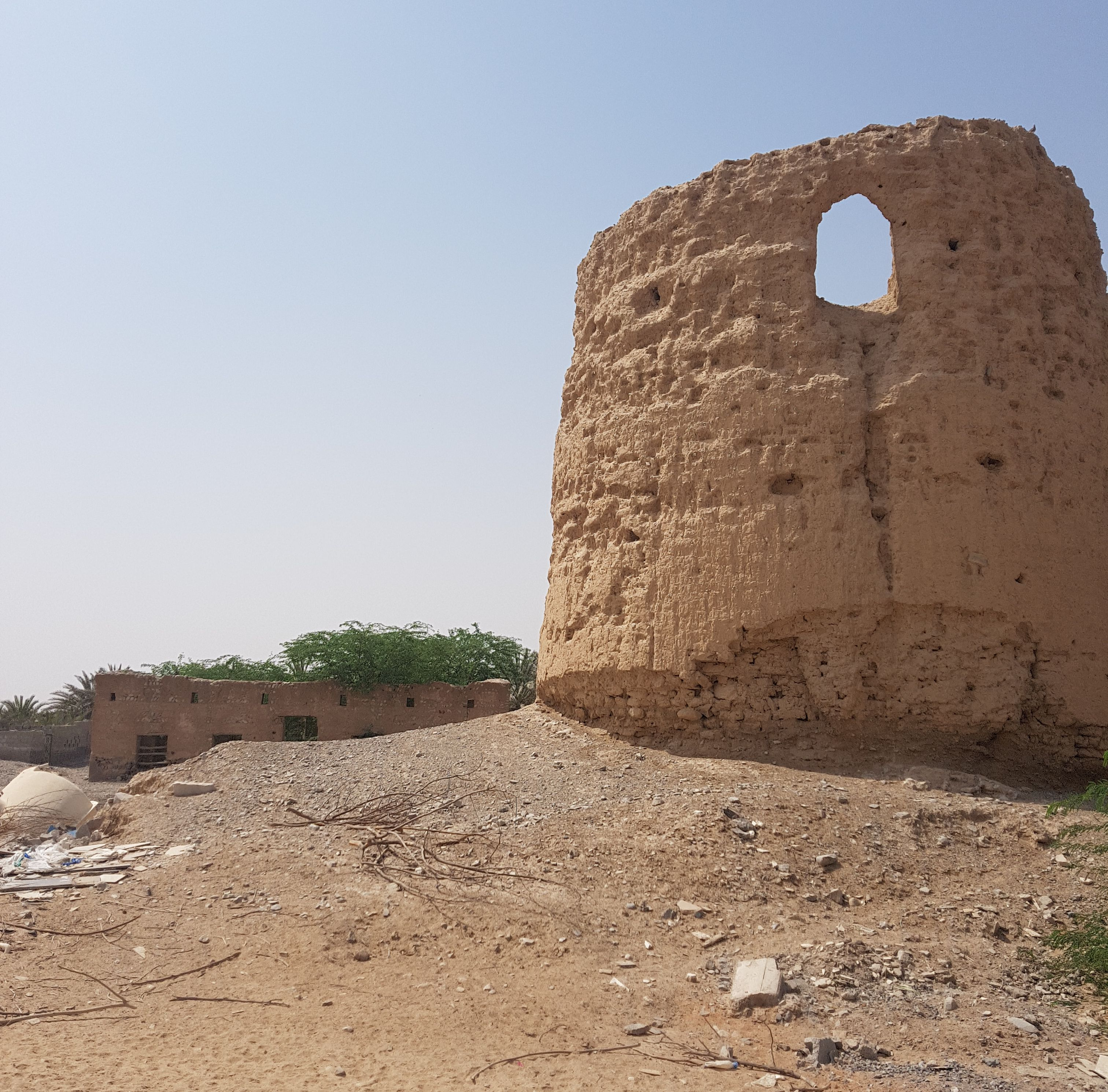
Watchtower at Khatt, Ras Al Khaimah

The tribe's settled territory included the Wadi Naqab in Ras Al Khaimah, to which the tribe gave its name. The tribe dispersed from the agriculturally rich wadi after a series of disputes with pre-Al Qawasim local rulers. The tribe has traditionally been considered close to the Qawasim.

Khatt and Fahlain, two villages on the Jiri plain where the Naqbiyin dominate the population, formed part of the Sheikhdom of the 19th century Qawasim ruler of Ras Al Khaimah, Hassan bin Rahma, who signed the General Maritime Treaty of 1820 with the British. In the 1819 expedition from Bombay, British forces sacked Ras Al Khaimah and Hassan bin Rahma signed a preliminary agreement to cede Ras Al Khaimah town, which became the British garrison. He signed the 1820 treaty as "Sheikh of Hatt and Falna, formerly of Ras Al Khaimah". Hatt is modern Khatt, while Falna is Fahlain.

In 1903, Lorimer noted the village of Fahlain consisted of 60 Naqbiyin houses and 2,000 date palms.

Khatt was populated in the main by members of the 'Awanat, Sharqiyin, and Naqbiyin tribes – today the Al Naqbi Tower still stands in the village. The settlement of the Naqbiyin here is said to have taken place over a period of 300 years.

== Shamaliyah ==
On the East coast, the area known as the Shamailiyah, the Naqbiyin were frequently in conflict with their neighbours, the Sharqiyin. The Naqbiyin were the 'powers behind the throne' when Kalba became independent of Sharjah in 1937, with the accession of the deposed former Ruler of Sharjah, Khalid bin Ahmad Al Qasimi, as Ruler of Kalba. Considered to have been present in Khor Fakkan prior to the Portuguese sack of that town under Albuquerque in 1506, the Naqbiyin were settled in strategic locations, given lands by the Al Qasimi, as a protection against the Sharqiyin.

The almost constant outbreaks of squabbling and disputes between Kalba and neighbouring Fujairah (itself only recognised as a Trucial State by the British in 1952) broke out into open fighting over a land dispute after the UAE was founded in 1971 and, in 1972 the newly founded Union Defence Force was called in to take control of the fighting which, by the time the UDF moved in, had killed 22 and seriously injured a dozen more. The dispute was finally settled after mediation between Sheikh Rashid of Dubai and other Rulers and a statement announcing the settlement sent out on 17 July 1972.
