= Wadi Naqab =

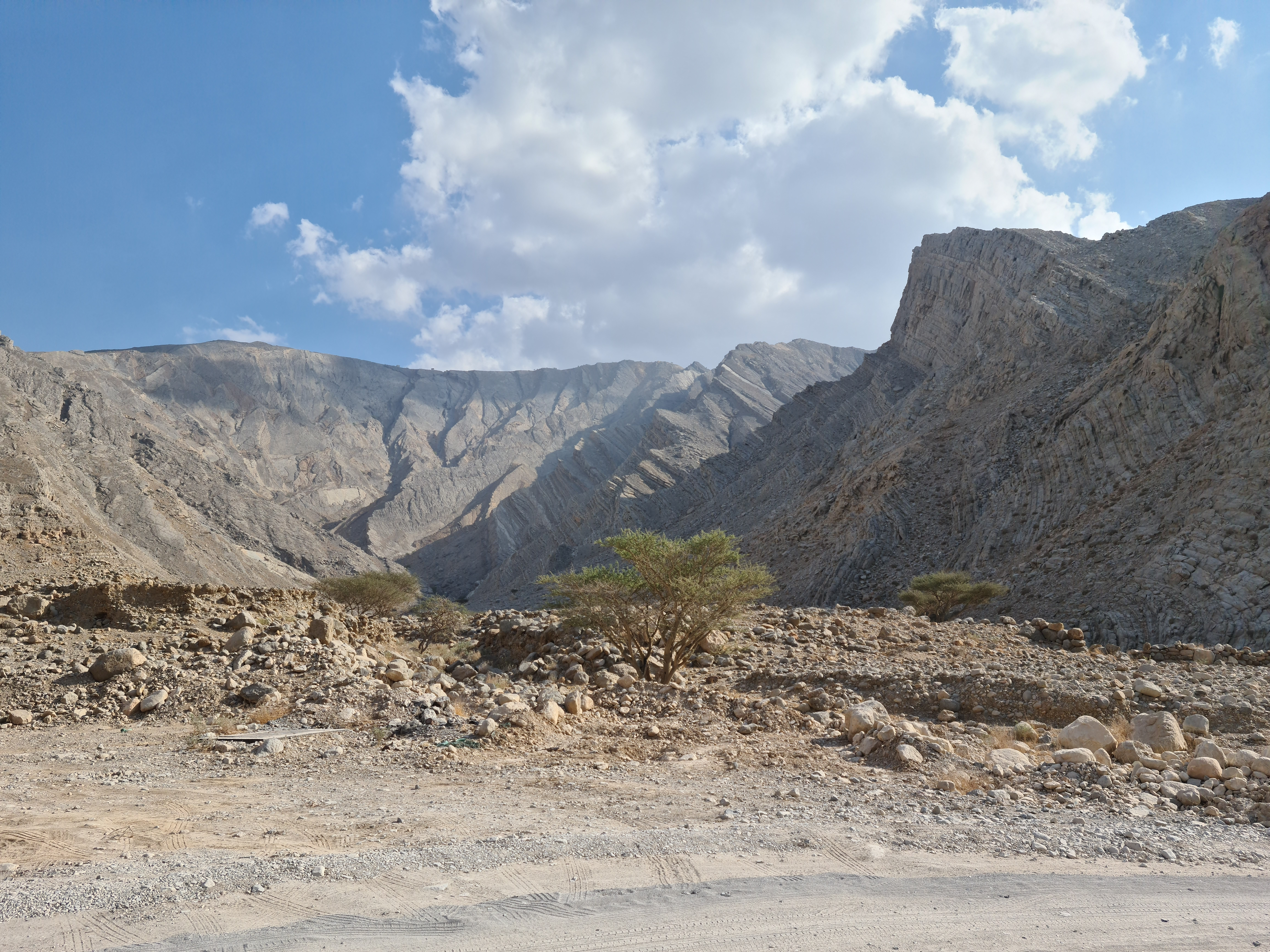

- Location within United Arab Emirates

Physical characteristics
- Mouth
  - coordinates: 25°41′41.3″N 56°02′43.3″E

Wadi Naqab is a seasonal watercourse, or wadi, in the Hajar Mountains of Ras Al Khaimah, United Arab Emirates.

An area of outstanding natural beauty and a popular hiking destination, the wadi cuts into the Yanas Mountain and has been the scene of numerous rescues of unwary and inexperienced hikers by Ras Al Khaimah Police. In the winter months it is prone to violent flash floods.

== Wadi ==
The wadi was long an agriculturally rich area, home to hundreds of fields in its upper reaches. It has been dammed with a 22 metre high and 257 metre wide dam with a capacity of some 1 million cubic metres, as part of a $44.1 million package of infrastructural developments announced in February 2020. The dam's construction cost was $7.3 million.

The upper reaches of the wadi are dangerous but popular with hikers, with a number of rescues in the area made annually by Ras Al Khaimah Police using helicopters, despite numerous warnings to inexperienced and ill-equipped hikers. The 'Red Wall' hike is one of the most commonly followed routes, but routes also lead to the mountain village of Sheri and the Wadi Kub and its seasonal pools.

Wadi Naqab displays remarkable tectonic uplift, particularly in a stratigraphic column extended over the Triassic – Jurassic boundary dating back 200 million years. Associated with a period of mass extinction, the end of the Triassic period is thought to have triggered massive methane release and the fossil record in the wadi reflects this, with rich deposits of fossils to be found in the area.

== Tribal lands ==
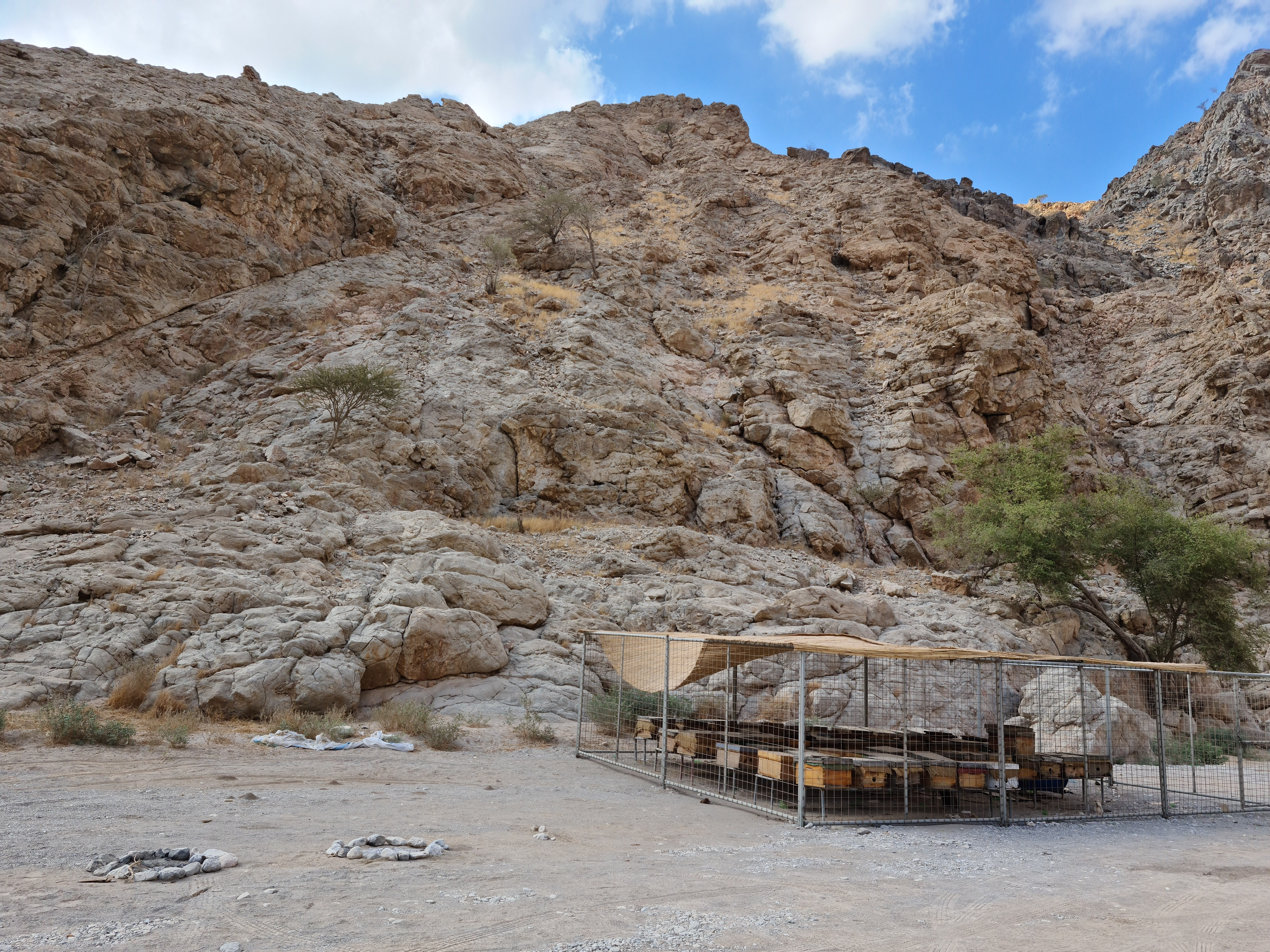
Honey bee hives in the Wadi Naqab

The area around Wadi Naqab was traditionally held by members of the Naqbiyin tribe, from whom it derives its name, but was gradually bought up by members of the Habus tribe after the Naqbiyin fell foul of local rulers, likely pre-Al Qasimi (in the period 1695–1740) and many moved to Dibba and Khor Fakkan. The Habus made the money to buy the land from labouring in date gardens, share cropping arable land and raising livestock. By about 1800, Wadi Naqab was considered to be Habus territory. Cultivating wheat and dates, the Habus of Wadi Naqab traded wheat, honey, live goats, dairy products such as ghee (clarified butter) and firewood in Ras Al Khaimah town, buying metal tools, coffee, salt and clothing.

=== Archaeology ===
The lower reaches of the Wadi Naqab have been found to contain burials from the Wadi Suq era, with a number of tombs destroyed by construction work around the building of the RAK Ring Road. Of the 60-odd tombs so far identified in the area, four were excavated by archaeologists from the University of Durham in the UK and the Ras Al Khaimah Antiquities Department prior to the construction work and were subsequently destroyed. Bone fragments, carnelian beads, seashell rings and stone vessels were found during the work.

== Gallery ==
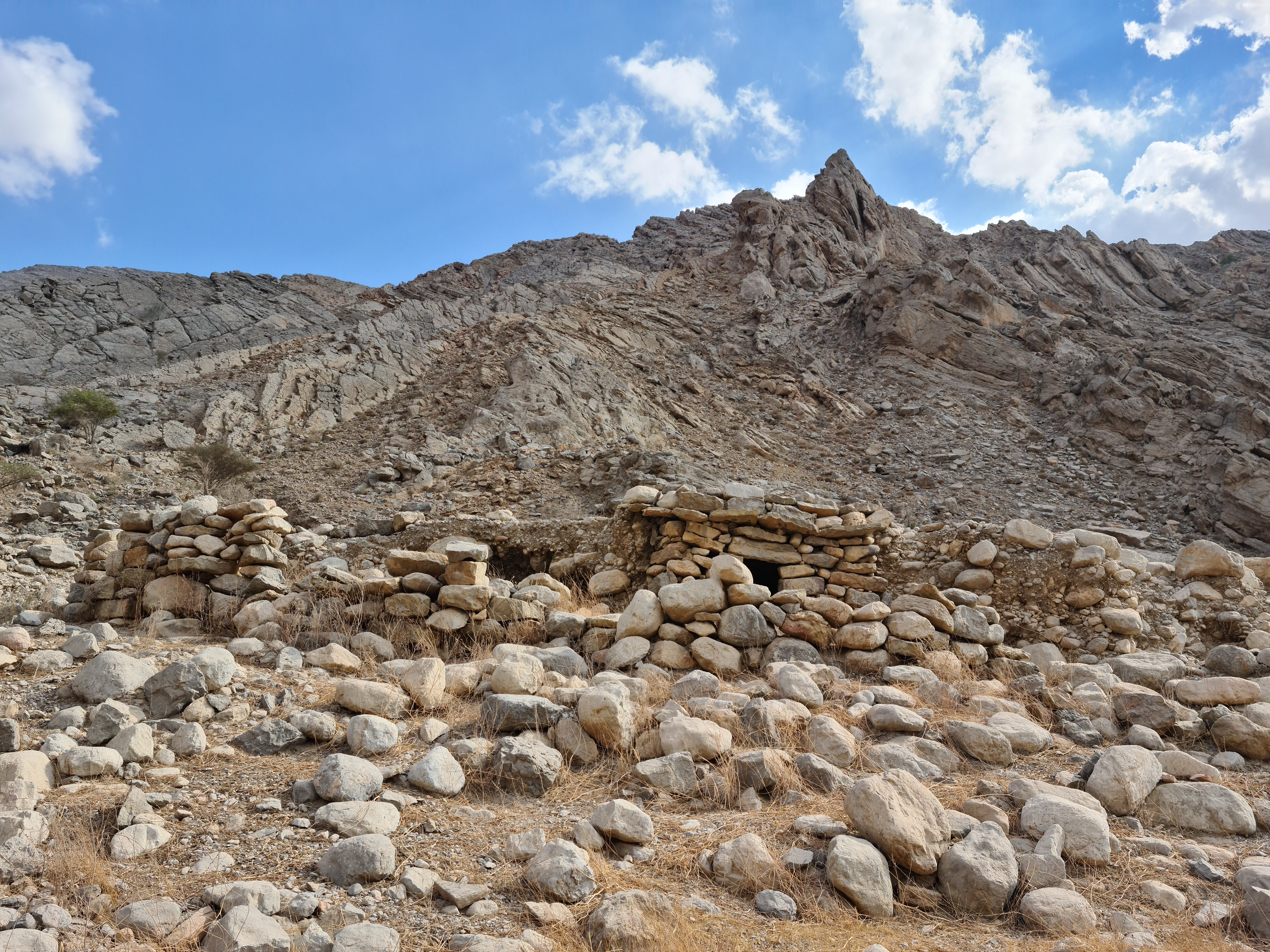
Abandoned farmhouse in the Wadi Naqab

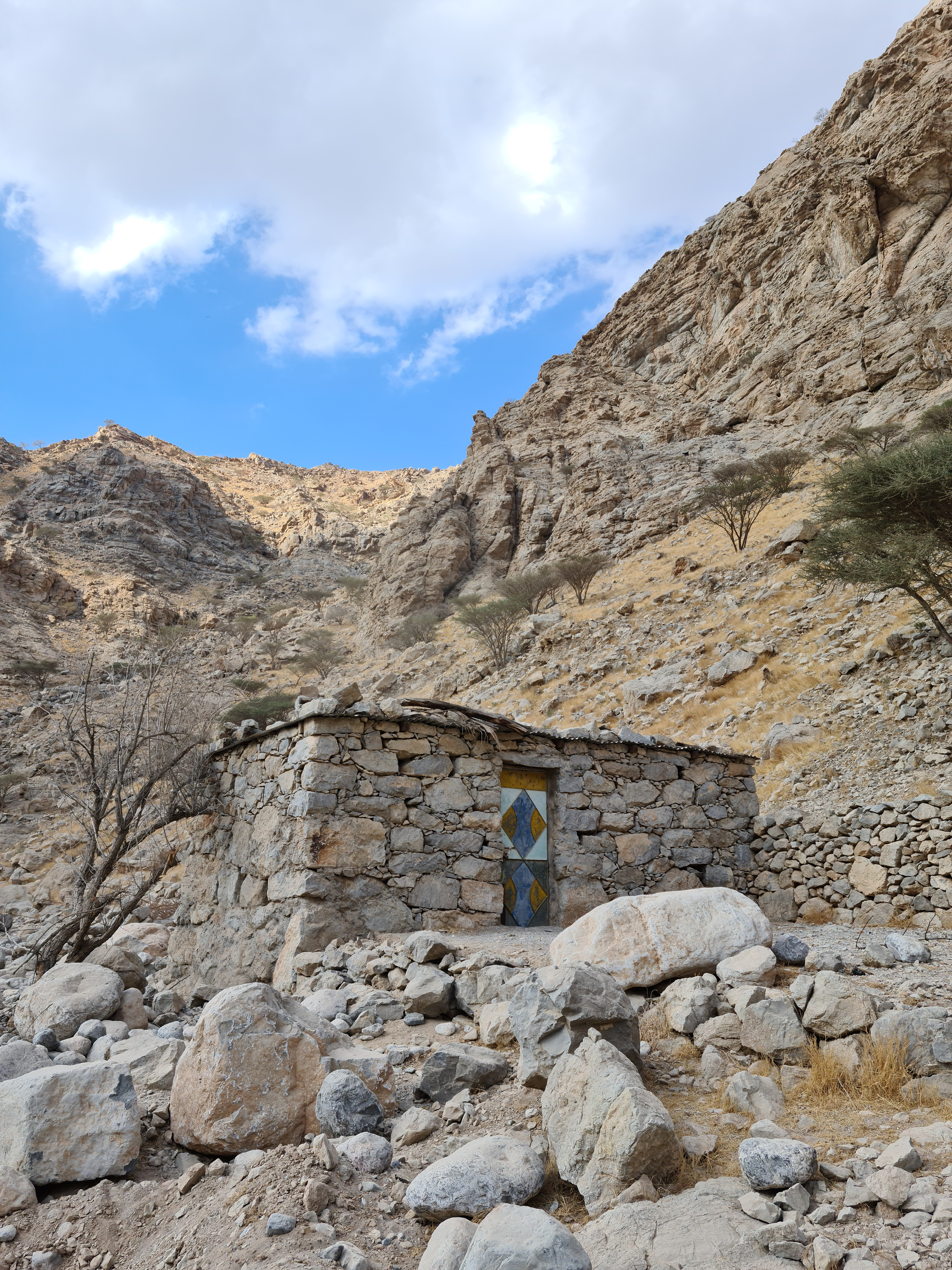
A traditional mountain house in the Wadi Naqab

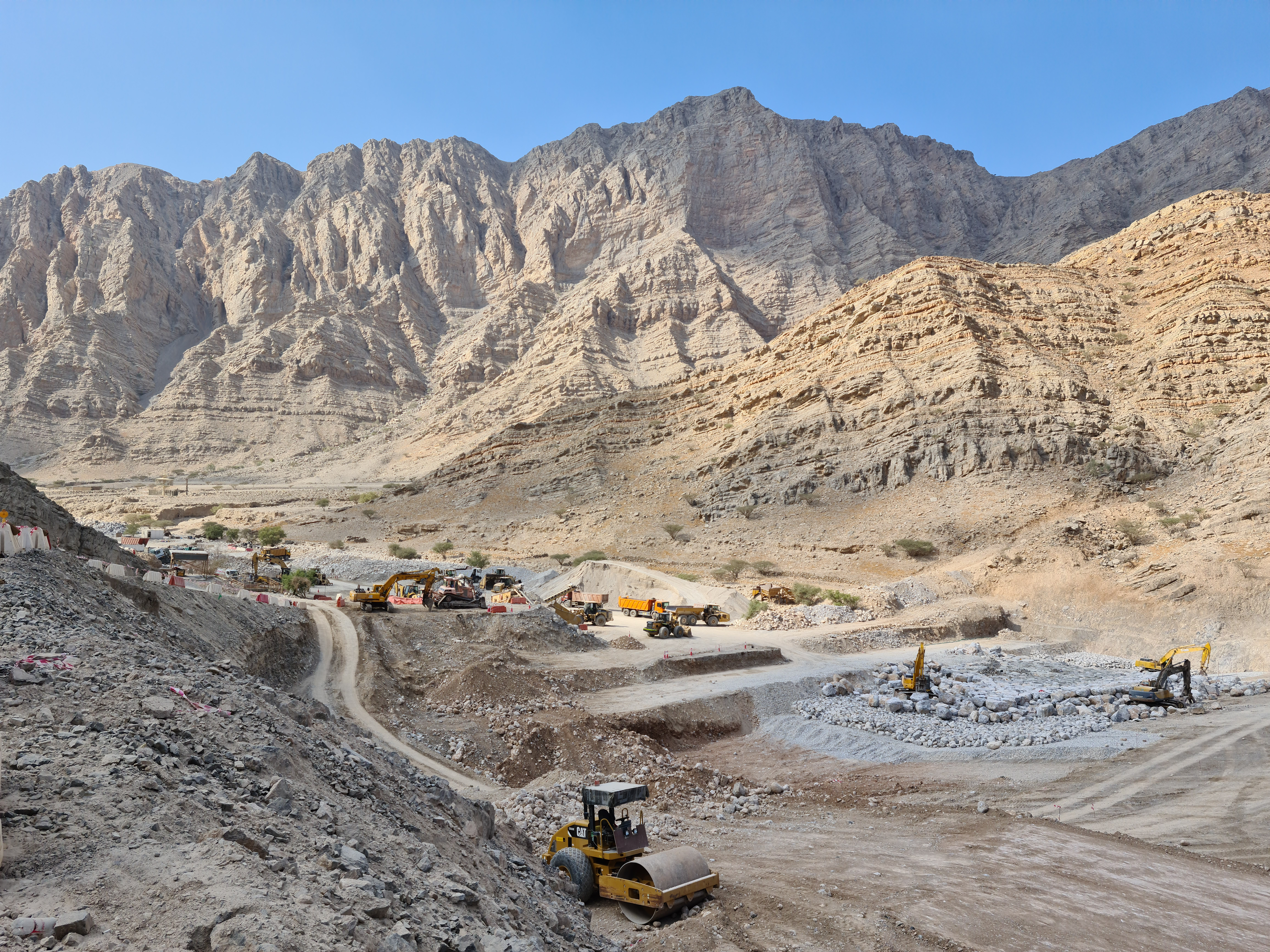
Construction of the Wadi Naqab Dam in 2020

== See also ==
- List of wadis of the United Arab Emirates
