= Al Hulaylah =

Al Hulaylah or Jazirat Al Hulaylah (Arabic: جزيرة الحليلة) is a island locality in the Emirate of Ras Al Khaimah, United Arab Emirates. The island is significant for its archaeological remains, which document settlement since the 5th century, maritime activity, and long-distance trade from the early Islamic period through later centuries. It lies opposite the town of Al Rams, north of Ras Al Khaimah city, and south of Khor Khwair.

== Geography ==
Jazirat Al Hulaylah is a low-lying barrier island in northern Ras Al Khaimah. It lies near Al Rams and the Dhayah area, close to the northern end of the coastal plain where the Hajar Mountains approach the Gulf. Mapping services describe it as a land-tied island near the suburb of Qurm and the town of Al Rams. The island is approximately eight kilometres long. Its physical structure consists of two parallel sand bars: an older and larger inner bar and a younger outer bar facing the open sea. A salt-encrusted sabkha plain lies between the two bars and is flooded at high tide. The inner bar contains stable dunes and most of the archaeological remains.

The highest dune, situated near the northern part of the island, reaches approximately 13–13.6 metres above the high-water mark. Much of the island is otherwise flat, with sparse vegetation and low relief. A lagoon separates the island from the mainland. The southern entrance to the lagoon, opposite Al Rams, forms a tidal channel that has historically served as a harbor for fishing boats.

== History and Archaeology ==
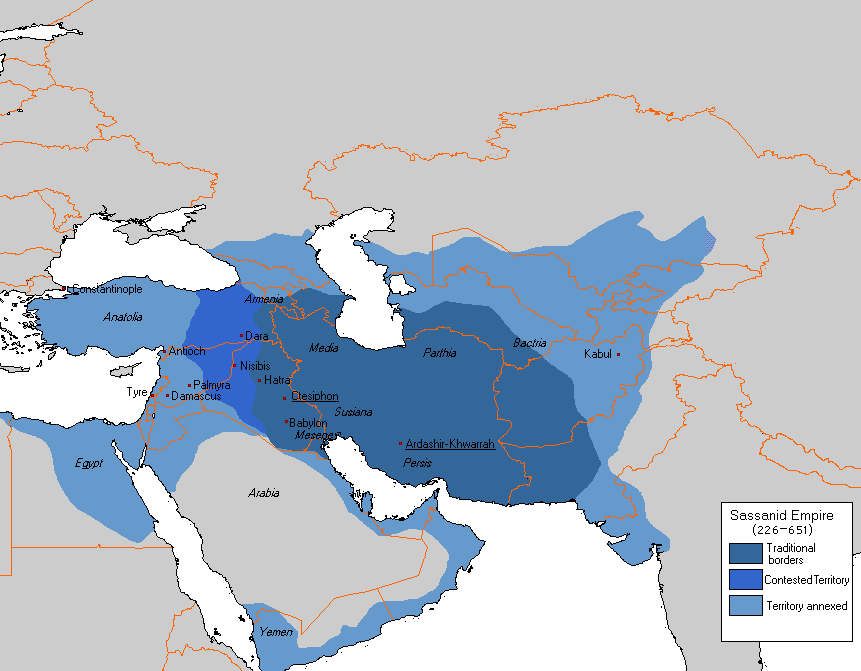
Sassanid Empire 226 - 651 (AD)

The first substantial occupation identified in a 1991 survey by British archaeologist Derek Kennet was concentrated near the southern end of the island, especially in areas designated by the survey as Areas 6, 26 and 30. This settlement occupied an estimated 42.9 hectares. Its position near the natural harbour indicates that maritime access was important from the beginning of the documented settlement sequence. Ras Al Khaimah’s official historical material identifies a small Sasanian-period site on Hulaylah Island and describes the island as one of the principal locations representing the early Islamic period in the emirate.

A second settlement developed during the ninth to eleventh centuries of the Abbasid period. It was located approximately two kilometres north of the main Period 1 settlement and covered an estimated 78.7 hectares. Unlike the more concentrated southern occupation, this settlement appears to have consisted of dispersed buildings, shell middens and occupation areas. Its pottery assemblage includes wares associated with the so-called Samarra horizon, including opaque white-glazed, cobalt-decorated, splashed, lustre and sgraffiato ceramics. These finds indicate participation in the commercial and technological networks of the Abbasid-period Gulf. he assemblage differs from that of Siraf, an important port on the Iranian coast, because it contains relatively little Far Eastern material. This may suggest that the settlement’s principal commercial connections were directed towards the Gulf and southern Iraq rather than directly towards the western Indian Ocean.

=== Hulaylah and Julfar ===
The relationship between Hulaylah and Julfar has been the subject of archaeological and historical debate. Historical sources refer to Julfar from the early Islamic period, but the later archaeological city identified as Julfar at Al Mataf appears to have been founded mainly in the fourteenth century. Kennet proposed that Hulaylah was the location of early Julfar before the development of the later city at Al Mataf. His argument was based on the extensive ninth–eleventh-century occupation at Hulaylah, the much later foundation date of the main settlement at Al Mataf, and the possibility that the name Julfar shifted from one settlement to another. The precursor settlement to Julfar was at Kush in Ras Al Khaimah.

The later occupation of Hulaylah was distributed across a larger part of the island. Kennet estimated that Period 3 occupation covered approximately 218.2 hectares. The most substantial visible remains occur in the southern and central parts of the island, including Areas 5, 8, 10, 12 and 14. The ceramic sequence includes Longquan celadons, Chinese blue-and-white porcelain, Near Eastern imitations of Chinese porcelain, Far Eastern storage jars and other imported or locally circulated wares. Longquan celadons from Hulaylah were generally dated to the fourteenth or fifteenth centuries, while most of the examined Chinese blue-and-white fragments were attributed to the sixteenth and seventeenth centuries.

The archaeological remains indicate that the island contained several small settlements rather than a single continuously occupied town. Area 8 contained approximately 54 collapsed rectangular structures spread over an area of about 700 by 200 metres. Most buildings measured approximately 6–9 metres by 4 metres and were constructed from small black-limestone boulders. Their plans resembled traditional house forms used in Ras Al Khaimah until relatively recent times. The settlement was associated with shell and rubbish middens and a nearby cemetery. Local residents told the survey team that they remembered the area being inhabited.

== Modern Era ==
Today, in the northern part of the island lies Al Hulaila Industrial Zone which is a specialized economic zone managed by the Ras Al Khaimah Economic Zone (RAKEZ). A small agricultural settlement now exists on the southern part as the 2023 Ras Al Khaimah census identifies the settlement as home to 658 inhabitents.

== See Also ==
- History of the United Arab Emirates
  - History of Ras Al Khaimah
- Islamic pottery
- Shimal
- Kush (Ras Al Khaimah)
- Wadi Rahabah
