= Urban Air Samba =

Czech ultralight aircraft

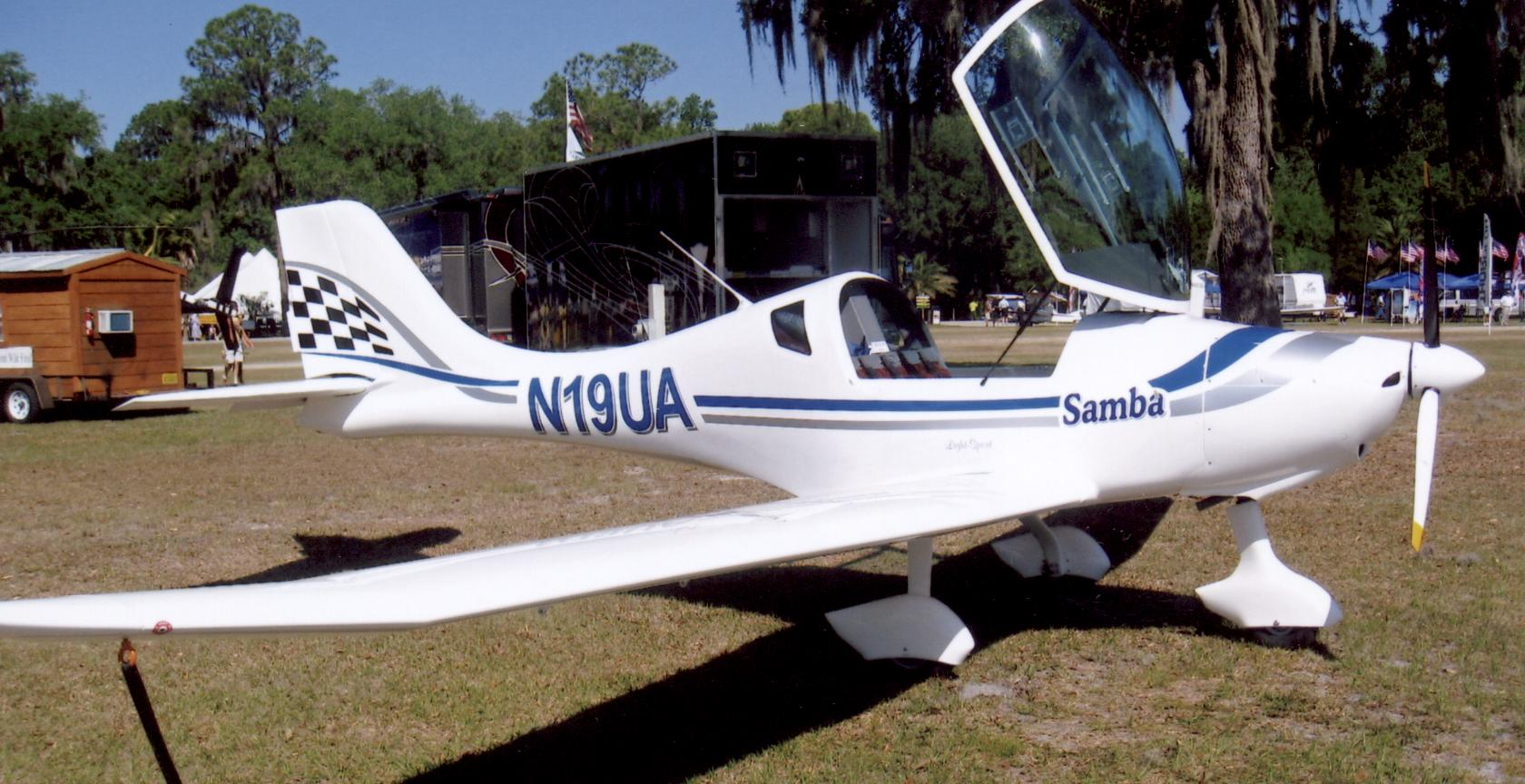
- Samba XXL of 2008 at Sun n'Fun Lakeland Florida in April 2009

General information
- Type: Two-seat composite light monoplane
- National origin: Czech Republic
- Manufacturer: Urban Air SPO; Distar Air
- Designer: Pavel Urban
- Status: In production
- Number built: circa 80 by 2009

History
- First flight: 1999
- Developed from: Urban Air Lambada

The Urban Air Samba is a Czech designed and built light aircraft of the 1990s which incorporates composite construction. It remained in series production in 2017.

Production of the Urban Air's designs, including the Samba, was taken up by Distar Air of Ústí nad Orlicí, Czech Republic in about 2010.

== Development ==
Urban Air SPO designed and built their first model, the two-seat side-by-side Urban Air UFM-13 Lambada, which first flew in 1996. From their original model, they developed the UFM-10 Samba which was of similar overall design, using all-composite construction. The wings were reduced in span and a conventional tail unit was incorporated in place of the 'T' layout of the Lambada. The earlier tailwheel undercarriage was replaced by a fixed tricycle layout.

The Samba XXL is a further development, introduced in 2003 for the Fédération Aéronautique Internationale microlight category, with a modified fuselage providing a larger and repositioned cockpit canopy, modified engine cowling and a more streamlined tail unit.

== Variants ==
Airo 5
Licensed version produced by Airo Aviation, Ras Al Khaimah Free Trade Zone, United Arab Emirates.

== Specifications (Samba XXL) ==
Data from pilotmix.com

General characteristics

- Crew: 1
- Capacity: 1 passenger
- Empty weight: 584 lb (265 kg)
- Gross weight: 1,041 lb (472 kg)
- Powerplant: 1 × Rotax 912 ULS , 80 hp (60 kW)

Performance

- Cruise speed: 137 mph (220 km/h, 119 kn)
- Stall speed: 40 mph (64 km/h, 35 kn)
- Maximum glide ratio: 18:1
- Rate of climb: 1,400 ft/min (7.1 m/s)
