= Airo 1 =

United Arab Emirates ultralight aircraft

General information
- Type: Ultralight aircraft and Light-sport aircraft
- National origin: United Arab Emirates
- Manufacturer: Airo Aviation
- Status: In production

History
- Introduction date: 2008
- Developed from: Euro Ala JetFox

The Airo 1 is a United Arab Emirates ultralight and light-sport aircraft produced by Airo Aviation of the Ras Al Khaimah Free Trade Zone. The aircraft is supplied as a complete ready-to-fly-aircraft.

== Design and development ==
The aircraft is a licensed development of the Italian Euro Ala JetFox and was designed to comply with the Fédération Aéronautique Internationale microlight rules and also the US light-sport aircraft rules. It features a strut-braced high-wing, a two-seats-in-side-by-side configuration enclosed cockpit, fixed tricycle landing gear and a single engine in tractor configuration. The company claims it was accepted as a US LSA in 2008 but it did not appear on the official Federal Aviation Administration 2016 list of S-LSAs.

The aircraft is made from bolted-together aluminum tubing, with its flying surfaces covered in doped aircraft fabric. Its 9.78 m (32.1 ft) span wing employs V-struts and jury struts. Standard engines available are the 80 hp (60 kW) Rotax 912UL and the 100 hp (75 kW) Rotax 912ULS four-stroke powerplants. The engine is mounted on the main keel tube that runs from the tail to the engine, mounting the engine above the cockpit.

== Specifications (Airo 1) ==
Data from Bayerl and Tacke

General characteristics

- Crew: one
- Capacity: one passenger
- Wingspan: 9.78 m (32 ft 1 in)
- Wing area: 14.62 m^{2} (157.4 sq ft)
- Empty weight: 278 kg (613 lb)
- Gross weight: 450 kg (992 lb)
- Fuel capacity: 59 litres (13 imp gal; 16 US gal)
- Powerplant: 1 × Rotax 912ULS four cylinder, liquid and air-cooled, four stroke, 75 kW (101 hp)
- Propellers: 3-bladed composite ground adjustable

Performance

- Maximum speed: 175 km/h (109 mph, 94 kn)
- Cruise speed: 150 km/h (93 mph, 81 kn)
- Stall speed: 60 km/h (37 mph, 32 kn)
- Rate of climb: 6 m/s (1,200 ft/min)
- Wing loading: 30.8 kg/m^{2} (6.3 lb/sq ft)
