= History of Ras Al Khaimah =

History of an Arabian emirate

The United Arab Emirates (UAE) is a relatively new country – it was formed in 1971. However, the history of the land that the UAE occupies dates back to the Neolithic Age, which is evidenced by inscriptions, drawings and archaeological finds uncovered in the seven emirates during the period from the early 1950s to the present day.

Archaeologists have found evidence of human settlement in the Emirate of Ras Al Khaimah from 7,000 years ago, making it one of the oldest continuously inhabited places in the world. Its location at the entrance of the Persian Gulf has always been strategic to the socio-economic and cultural growth of the emirate. It has also meant that Ras Al Khaimah has also been fending off invading forces; the remnants of numerous historic forts and towers testify to its eventful history.

== Ancient history ==
=== The Neolithic Age ===
There is a partly destroyed shell mound twenty-three kilometres south-west of the modern city of Ras Al Khaimah, near the abandoned fishing town of Jazirat al-Hamra. This heap of prehistoric domestic waste is known as a shell midden, and consists mostly of fish bones and mollusc shells as well as fragmentary remains of dugong and livestock bones. It is of little interest to tourists and passers-by, but it is of immense value to the understanding of Ras Al Khaimah's ancient past.

The site was first identified by German archaeologists in the late 1980s, when fragments of Mesopotamian pottery dating from the Ubaid period were found among the heap of fish bones and mollusc shells. Their presence is evidence that the mound was of Neolithic origin and could be dated to the fifth or sixth millennia BC, indicating that the ceramic shards were some of the oldest pieces of pottery ever found in the lower Gulf. They also provided evidence that Ras Al Khaimah could trace its history back at least 7,000 years.

Not much is known about the people who inhabited the emirate 7,000 years ago, although a clearer picture has been pieced together over the past thirty years. It has been established that they occupied seasonal settlements, living largely as fishermen and hunters, along the coast. The existence of maritime trade has been proved by fragments of Ubaid pottery discovered at Jazirat al-Hamra, although the full extent of that trade is not known. Inland, the people were primarily nomadic, or semi-nomadic, pastoralists who herded cattle, sheep and goats. The presence of sophisticated tools has been evidenced by the discovery of arrowheads, scrapers, knives and borers at sites across the UAE, as well as flakes (a type of stone tool) and blades made from different kinds of flint at the shell midden near Jazirat al-Hamra.

The climate conditions were friendlier 7,000 years ago, as there were freshwater lakes and grasslands for livestock, as well as extensive seagrass meadows that were suitable for dugong and other marine life. No other remnants of the Neolithic Age have yet been discovered, leaving only a few traces of human existence.

=== The Bronze Age ===
A more sophisticated culture began to emerge during the Bronze Age. This era has been traditionally divided into four separate periods, from the Hafit Period of the late fourth and early third millennia BC, to the Umm an-Nar (2600–2000 BC), the Wadi Suq (2000–1600 BC) and the Late Bronze Age (1600–1250 BC) cultures that was present in what is now the UAE and northern Oman.

The first three periods are named after the locations where evidence of their existence was first discovered: the Hafit Period was named after Jebel Hafit in Al Ain; Umm an-Nar was named after an island off the coast of Abu Dhabi with the same name; Wadi Suq was named so for an eponymous valley located between Al Ain and the Oman coast. The study of these periods has been entirely dependent on archaeology due to the lack of historical evidence.

In contrast to the Neolithic inhabitants of Ras Al Khaimah, the Hafit Period saw the evolution of oases settlements. Archaeological evidence for this period has been found at many locations, including at Khatt and Qarn al-Harf.

Khatt, a village renowned for its hot springs, is the oldest permanently inhabited area of Ras Al Khaimah, with evidence of human activity dating back to the Neolithic Period. It was first discovered by British archaeologist Beatrice de Cardi in 1977, who founds burial cairns situated on the lower ridges east of the springs. Qarn al-Harf represents a solitary hill in front of the Hajar mountains between Wadi Bih and Wadi Naqab.

The Umm an-Nar Period has given Ras Al Khaimah some of its greatest archaeological discoveries. This is most apparent at Shimal, where there are two circular tombs representing the largest funerary structures ever found in south-east Arabia. Shimal is a dense archaeological landscape located about eight kilometres north-east of the city of Ras Al Khaimah, and has numerous prehistoric tombs. It is the emirate's largest pre-Islamic site, not just in relation to the Umm an-Nar culture, but to all subsequent eras prior to the arrival of Islam.

The transition from the Umm an-Nar to the Wadi Suq Period is contested. Archaeologists agree that climate change began to transform the lives of the inhabitants of the Arabian peninsula from around 2200 BC, though the extent of that transformation is debated. However, it is certain that the abrupt onset of drought conditions led to extreme aridity and a dramatic change in the landscape.

The majority of Wadi Suq sites are found along the northern coast, where human habitation was encouraged by maritime resources, palm gardens and availability of fresh water. However, there was a sudden change in settlement pattern as well as the construction of tombs and the style of pottery produced at the beginning of the second millennium BC. The location of Wadi Suq tombs indicate that the majority of people lived in dispersed palm garden settlements.

A number of Wadi Suq settlements continued to be occupied during the Late Bronze Age, including Tell Abraq and Kalba. Information on the Late Bronze Age period in Ras Al Khaimah comes from a settlement in the Shimal area, which was first excavated in 1986. It was built on the slopes of the Ru's al-Jabal and developed around a prominent triangular rock. A large defensive wall was constructed along the edge of the wadi terrace to the south, and the settlement has revealed the existence of arish-style housing on the terraced levels above the wadi bed.

=== The Iron Age ===
The Iron Age (1300–600 BC) is defined by technological innovation, the development of mud brick villages, the appearance of notable fortifications, and the arrival of foreign powers and influence. This time period is also defined by the domestication of the camel, which enabled the movement of goods and people across the desert, as well as impacted foreign trade due to the creation of long-distance caravan routes that linked south-east Arabia with south Arabia and the Levant. This innovation in animal husbandry had far-reaching consequences for the region, as did another important Iron Age innovation – the falaj.

Around 1000 BC, a new irrigation system was invented in south-east Arabia known as a falaj, one of the oldest systems of its kind in the world. It is composed of a series of underground water channels, which brought water from aquifers along the mountains to low-lying agricultural terrain. Its impact was profound, as it enabled the distribution of water to a large number of farmers and the cultivation of wider areas of previously arid land. The invention of the falaj system necessitated the development of administrative centres, which led to the formation of increasingly complex communities.

=== The Late Pre-Islamic Period ===
The Achaemenid Empire started declining by 330 BC, towards the end of the Iron Age. This meant that Maka was no longer a Persian province and south-east Arabia was, at the time, free from foreign political interference. Although the Achaemenid Empire had been defeated by the armies of Alexander the Great, the Greeks did not establish their dominance over this region. The Parthian Empire, which emerged in 247 BC, would become a major political and cultural power, but the exact extent of its influence in Ras Al Khaimah during the centuries leading up to the arrival of Islam is unclear.

The final era prior to the arrival of Islam is the Sasanian Period (AD 300–632). According to the Karnamag-e Ardashir-e Pabagan (The Book of Deeds of Ardashir son of Pabag), which recounts the story of Ardashir, the founder of the Sassanid dynasty, the Sasanian Empire fought the men of Mazun (of which Ras Al Khaimah was a part) from the outset. Although Persian rule was probably limited to a military presence along the coast, it is now clear that a sizeable portion of Ras Al Khaimah was occupied by the Sasanian Empire during the latter part of their rule. This is apparent at Kush, an archaeological tell lying within the Shimal plain. Excavations carried out by the Ras Al Khaimah Department of Antiquities and Museums have revealed a large, probably public building complex and a variety of artefacts.

== Dawn of Islam ==
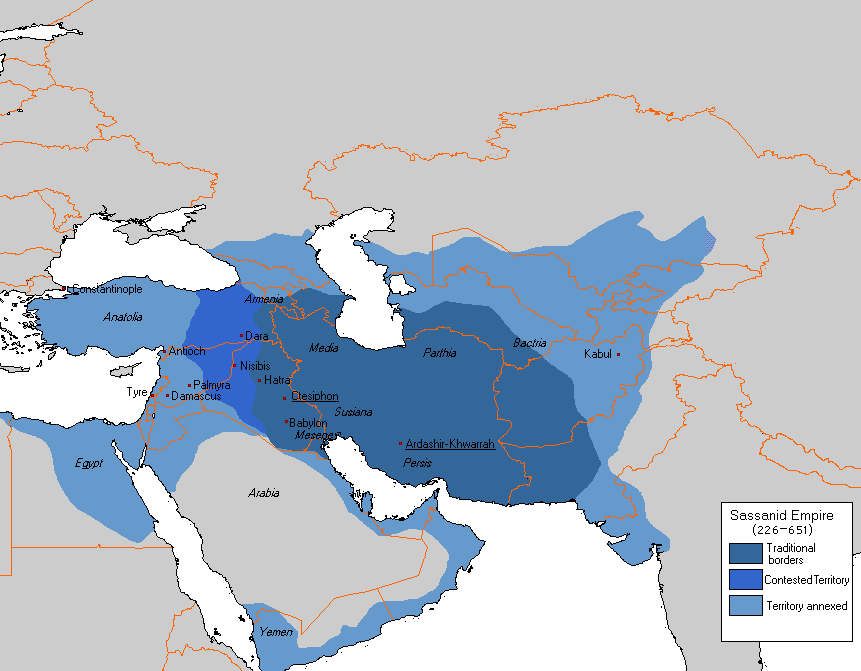
Sassanid Empire 226 - 651 (AD)

There is not much knowledge about south-east Arabia in the years leading up to the arrival of Islam, however, for the first time, there are written sources available, which shifts the reliance on archaeology. Arab chroniclers during the Islamic Golden Age provides an image of south-east Arabia on the eve of Islam, with images populated with kings and princes, empires and warfare, merchants and the trading town of Julfar.

According to the ninth century historian Ahmad Ibn Yahya al-Baladhuri, author of the Kitab Futuh al-Buldan (‘Book of the Conquests of Lands’), in the years prior to Islam, much of Oman and the eastern coast of the UAE was dominated by a branch of the Azd tribe known as the Banu Al Julanda. The geographer and historian Ahmad al-Ya’qubi, whose Tarikh al-Yaqubi is an account of the pre-Islamic peoples of the Arabian peninsula, mentions other branches of the Azd, including the Al-Huddan, who are believed to have resided along the northern coast of the UAE, including Ras Al Khaimah.

=== Islamic dynasties in the Arab world ===
The submission of tribal leaders to the Umayyad and Abbasid caliphates was not assured despite their conversion to Islam and the defeat of the Sasanian Empire. The relationship between the tribes of south-east Arabia and the centralised authority of Damascus or Baghdad was defined by independence, hostility and open conflict. Within that environment, the port of Julfar became a pivotal rallying point for a series of bloody confrontations during the early years of Islam.

There are only a few sources that explores what took place during the initial years of the Umayyad Caliphate, which include those of Sirhan Ibn Sa’id and Hamid ibn Muhammad ibn Ruzayq, the author of A History of the Imams and Seyyids of Oman. Other Abbasid-era historians, including Khalifah Ibn Khayyat, mention the campaigns against the sons of Abd bin Al Julanda – Suleiman and Said – only in passing.

Archaeological evidence for this period is scarce, although there is some well-presented evidence of the early centuries of Islamic rule at Kush and on the island of Hulaylah. Kush has been identified as the commercial centre of the original port of Julfar through excavations that revealed a substantial tower from the early Islamic period.

Julfar is the only settlement on the southern Persian Gulf that is consistently mentioned by early Arab historians, due to its strategic location close the Strait of Hormuz, its safe harbour and access to the fertile palm gardens of Shimal. Even the medieval geographer Al-Maqdisi mentions very little of the wider region, despite it being central to successive military campaigns, including those by the Abbasid caliphs during the ninth century.

There is a greater availability of archaeological evidence of the later Islamic period, which broadens the understanding of life in Ras Al Khaimah. There is also an upsurge in historical sources and the emergence of buildings such as the Queen of Sheba's Palace, which shows the Emirate as prosperous and urbanised. This is exemplified best in Julfar, which would become the most famed and prosperous trading town in the lower Gulf.

=== The beginnings of Julfar ===
Julfar was the birthplace of the renowned navigator Ahmed ibn Majid, a focal point for maritime power, and the only port providing access from the Persian Gulf to south-east Arabia.

It is strategically located close to the Strait of Hormuz, which boosted maritime trade, which in turn made Julfar an importance place for successive empires.

The town had only a few buildings, with the majority of the population living within the palm gardens, either in mud brick, stone or arish houses. The gardens were the source of life, providing a harvest of dates and other fruit such as oranges and lemons, as well as vegetables and fodder for livestock.

Although there is no accurate estimate of the size of the population, historians assume that it would have been substantial, with early Julfar linked to the coast by a lagoon and a network of navigable channels, despite now lying a few kilometres inland.

One of the most famous historical figures associated with medieval Julfar is Ibn Majid, who is now considered a national hero and a cultural icon. He had written numerous books, which provide historians with details about his life. He was an experienced navigator, cartographer and poet and a pioneer of navigational science, and transformed Arab navigation in the Indian Ocean into a highly organised discipline.

Wadi Sur was a monument to Julfar's strength and wealth. It was one of the largest fortifications in south-east Arabia, which by the end of the sixteenth century was obsolete. The Portuguese replaced the Kingdom of Hormuz as the dominant power in the Persian Gulf in the early sixteenth century, taking the island of Hormuz itself in 1507 and establishing a chain of fortified settlements across the Indian Ocean.

== European interest in Ras Al Khaimah ==
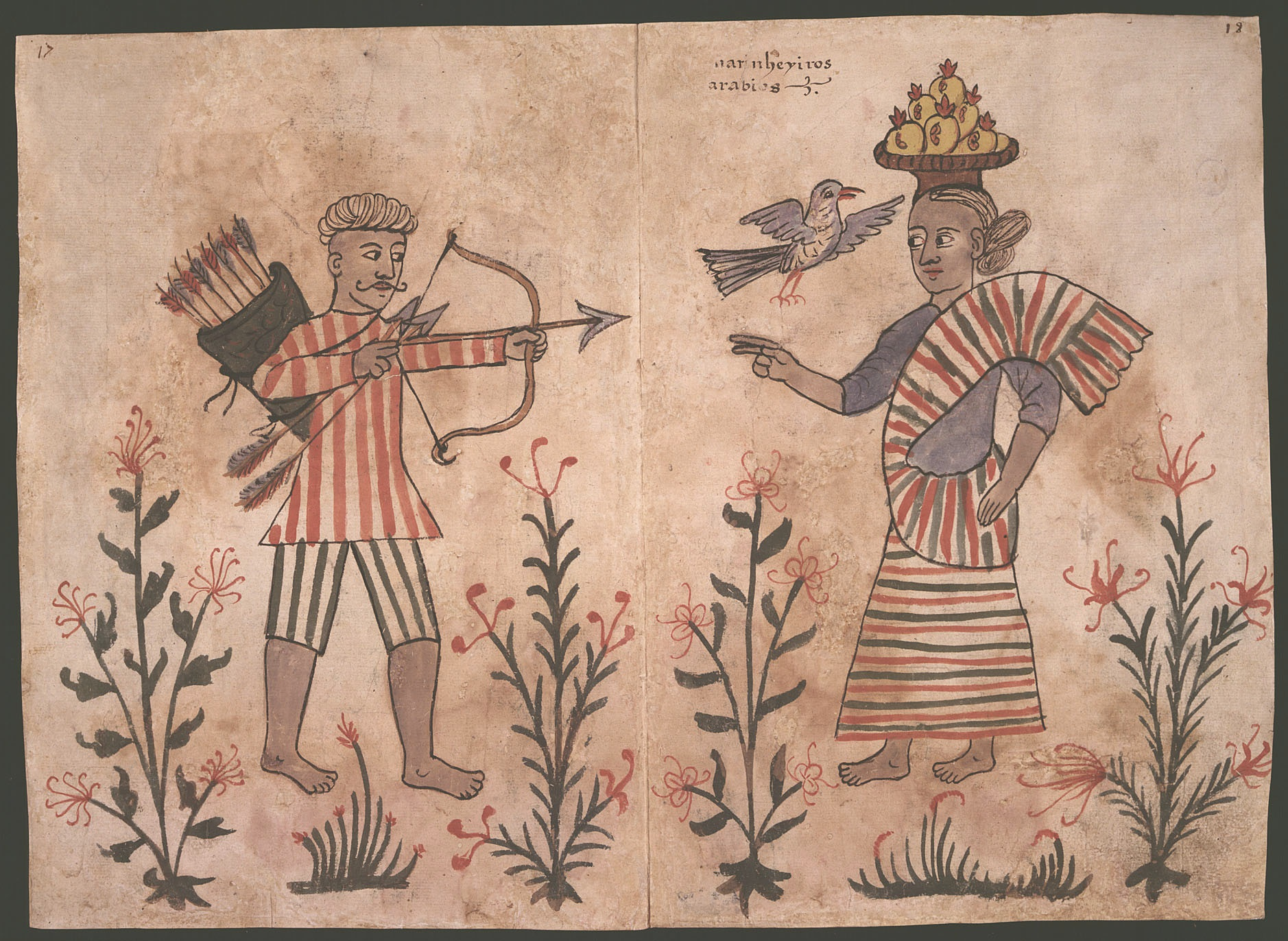
Codice Casanatense Arabian Sailors

=== The Portuguese Era ===
At the turn of the sixteenth century, Ras Al Khaimah continued to be a major trading hub in south-east Arabia, with it being remaining strategically and logistically important. For the first few years of the new century, Ras Al Khaimah remained under the influence of the Kingdom of Hormuz, which suffered from a period of internal turmoil from 1498 to 1505.

An era of European dominance in the Persian Gulf started when the Portuguese, under the command of Afonso de Albuquerque, attacked Hormuz in 1507. The Portuguese were the first European proponents of seaborne violence and protectionism to enter the Arabs’ sphere of maritime influence, which upended centuries of free-flowing trade.

For more than a hundred years, the Portuguese enforced their monopoly on commerce, which shifted the balance of power and brought about the decline of Arab interests. The Portuguese turned both the Indian Ocean and the Persian Gulf into militarised zones, which broke centuries of peaceful trade between the Arab world and the Indian subcontinent.

The Portuguese valued Ras Al Khaimah for the same reasons as all the previous empires and kingdoms. It was strategically located, provided access to fertile palm gardens, and was a major hub for trade in everything from pepper to pearls. However, there is little evidence of direct Portuguese involvement in Ras Al Khaimah, despite an atlas by the cartographer Lazaro Luis recording a series of Portuguese fortresses along the coast of the Oman Peninsula, including one at Julfar, in 1563.

When Hormuz was captured by English and Persian forces in 1622 and other important towns were lost, the Portuguese became directly involved in Ras Al Khaimah. This was a period of revolt, with Portuguese, English and Persian powers trying to retain control over the area. It was during this period that the first ever recorded mention of the Qawasim originates.

The Portuguese presence in Ras Al Khaimah lasted little over eleven years, and ended with the emergence of Nasir bin Murshid, the first Imam of the Ya’Arabi dynasty of Oman. He united the warring tribes of Oman, which led to an attack on Ras Al Khaimah and Rams in 1633 and the successful capture of both towns. The loss of Hormuz and the attacks from the Ya’Arabi led to the collapse of Portuguese power and influence.

=== The Dutch Era ===
There was a shift in the balance of power in the Persian Gulf, when the combined Dutch and English fleet engaged with the Portuguese in the Battle off Strait of Hormuz in 1625. Although the battle was inconclusive, it marked the end of the Portuguese era of naval dominance. From that time on, the Dutch East India Company and the English East India Company – both joint stock companies –competed for influence in the Persian Gulf, which led to conflict between the two countries and the emergence of the Dutch as masters of the sea.

The Dutch came to the Persian Gulf to trade, and relied on force to procure lucrative trade agreements with various rulers. They issued naval trade licenses, taxed passing vessels, and controlled commercial assets coming in and out of the Persian Gulf, all of which put them in contact with the rulers of Ras Al Khaimah.

Although little is known about who those rulers were, the power and influence of the Qawasim gradually increased. The emirate's earliest known leader, Sheikh Rahma bin Matar Al Qasimi, was described by the Dutch as the ‘Emir of Julfar’ and as one of the richest and most influential of Arab merchants in the early eighteenth century.

The primary source of information relating to the emirate from this time comes from Baron Tiddo Frederik van Kniphausen, the Dutch East India Company's agent on the island of Kharg. He described the town as having 400 well-armed men and around sixty large vessels that were capable of travelling as far as Mocha in Yemen. He also provided the earliest known description of the coastal town of Jazirat al-Hamra, which he described as being inhabited by the Za’ab tribe and engaged in pearling.

By the time of Kniphausen's visit, however, the Dutch were already in decline. By the 1750s, they had lost most of their holdings in the Indian Ocean and their factories in the region were eventually closed due to increased competition from the British. The Dutch continued to operate from Kharg until 1766, when Arab resistance, led by Mir Muhanna, resulted in Dutch defeat and the liberation of the island.

However, the Qawasim, in contrast, were gaining power during this time.

=== The British Era ===
By the time the British took interest in the affairs of Ras Al Khaimah, the Qawasim not only ruled Ras Al Khaimah, but Sharjah and parts of the Persian coastline, too, which included the port town of Lingah and Laft on the island of Qeshm.

However, it was Ras Al Khaimah that formed the centre of Qawasim power, and from 1777, the emirate was ruled by Sheikh Saqr bin Rashid Al Qasimi. The Qawasim commanded an enormously strategic position through their possessions on both sides of the Strait of Hormuz. This enabled them to play an important role in the region's affairs, but it also brought them in conflict with Britain, which wished to secure access to the Persian Gulf for its trade.

A detailed contemporary account of the events from this time can only be found on the British East India Company's records, which only gives one side of the historical picture. The British accusations of piracy by the Qawasim have been disputed by a number of writers and historians and a lack of local contemporary sources complicates the issue.

The first direct accusations of piracy were made by the British against the Qawasim in 1804. Two British ships, the Trimmer and the Shannon, were attacked by Sheikh Qadhib al Qasimi, the ruler of Lingeh, in December of that year, followed by two confrontations with Qawasim vessels in 1805. The British responded by signing a peace treaty between themselves and the Qawasim, led by Sheikh Sultan bin Saqr Al Qasimi, in 1806. However, hostilities continued, and the British responded with a military assault on Ras Al Khaimah in 1809. The bombardment was initially ineffective but many of the town's defences were damaged or destroyed and an unknown number of fighters and civilians killed. However, Ras Al Khaimah was rebuilt under the guidance of the Qawasim leaders.

The situation between the powers became progressively worse in the following years, until the British finally ordered a military assault on Ras Al Khaimah in 1819. It was larger and more organised than previous assaults, and led to the Qawasim's defeat, the capture of their fleet and the British occupation of Ras Al Khaimah. From then on, the British imposed a series of treaties on the rulers of what would become the Trucial States, beginning with the General Peace Treaty of 1820. The British created the post of Political Agent for the Lower Gulf to enforce the treaty, which was followed by a number of other agreements, including the Maritime Truce of 1835 and the Perpetual Maritime Truce of 1853.

In total, British involvement in the Persian Gulf covered a period of almost 400 years. From the first expeditions of the English East India Company, to the country's imperial heyday in the nineteenth century and its withdrawal from the Trucial States in 1971, Britain dominated the region.

== The Qawasim ==
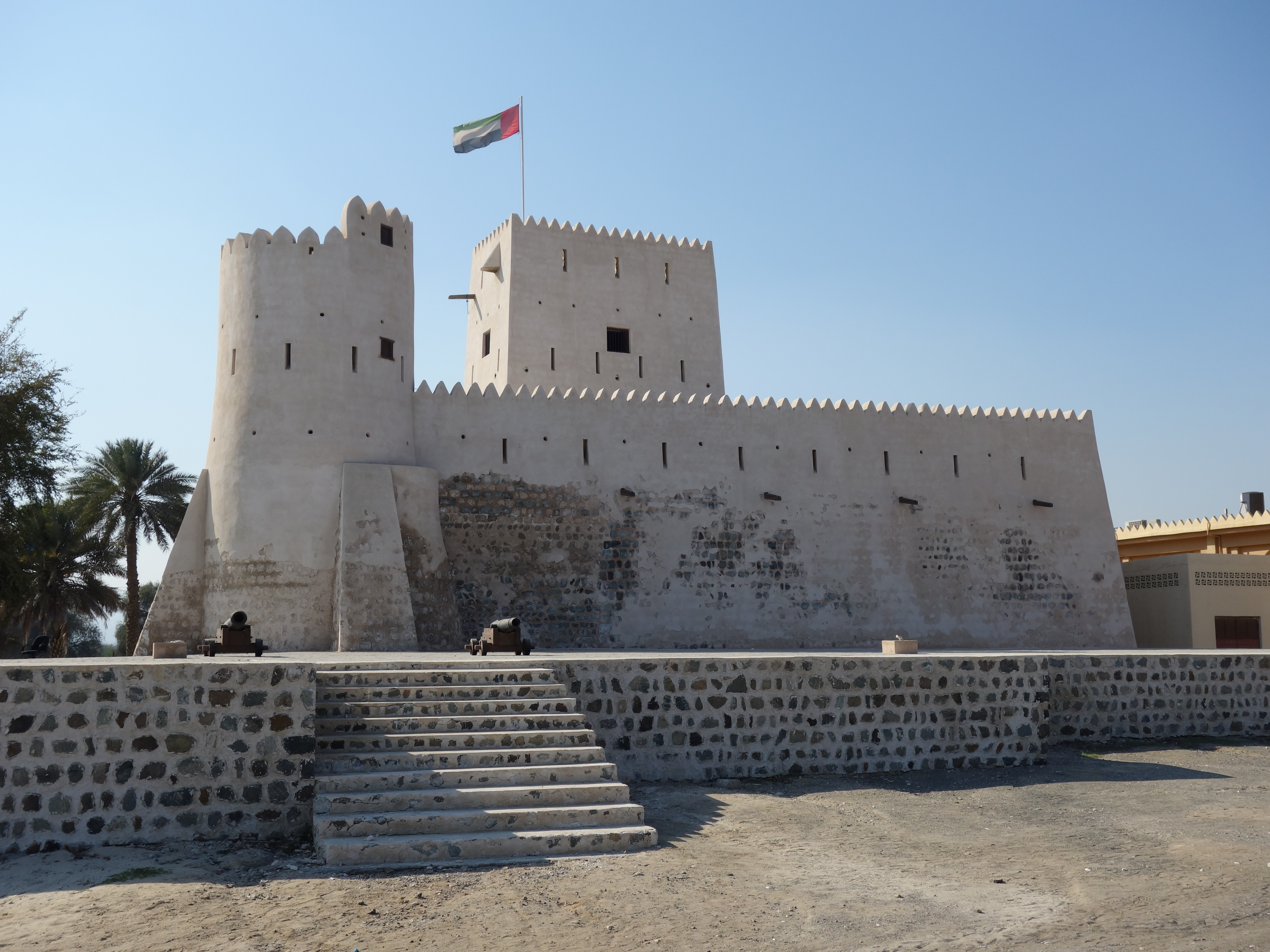
Kalba Fort

=== The maritime prowess of the Qawasim ===
The Qawasim continued a seafaring tradition that dated back millennia. The coast of Ras Al Khaimah was, and remains, a hub for maritime activity, from the traders of the Umm an-Nar era and ‘the ships of Magan’ to medieval Julfar and the fifteenth century navigator Ahmed bin Majid.

There is a long heritage of trading, fishing, pearling and navigation. Although trade was their primary concern, throughout much of the eighteenth century the Qawasim were in conflict with the Omanis, the Persians, and the various tribes of the islands and shoreline of south-west Persia. These confrontations were centred around Bandar Abbas and the island of Qeshm, but seaborne conflict spread across the entirety of the lower Gulf and the Strait of Hormuz.

His Highness Sheikh Sultan bin Muhammad Al-Qasimi, Ruler of Sharjah, has carried out extensive research into the Qawasim, British accusations of piracy, and the power struggles that swept across the Persian Gulf during the middle part of the eighteenth century. His studies give a sense of the conflict that raged throughout that period: for example, in June 1760, the Qawasim arrived at Bandar Abbas with an estimated 800–1,000 men and a fleet of fifty vessels. On 23 July 1760, they fought an engagement with the forces of Nasir Khan off the coast of Lingeh, leading to Khan's defeat and eventual retreat. In 1761, a Qawasim fleet consisting of thirty gallivats (small armed boats), dhows and other vessels met a combined Omani and Banu Ma’in force, defeating them near the island of Larak.

Although the Qawasim suffered some defeats, they were powerful mariners, fighters, merchants and traders. The British author James Silk Buckingham wrote that they “were so much more skilful, industrious, and faithful in their engagements than the other tribes of the coast, that they were always preferred and constantly spoken of as the best people throughout the Gulf.”

Lieutenant H. H. Whitelock noted that “they are mostly seafaring people, and at some seasons of the year, particularly during the pearl fishery, the towns are nearly deserted by the men, who leave their wives and children at home under the care of those who have passed the period for active employment in such arduous work.” His account also provided an estimate of the number of men and boats involved in pearling, which was 350 vessels and 3,150 men for Ras Al Khaimah, Sharjah and their dependencies.

== Beginnings of the UAE ==
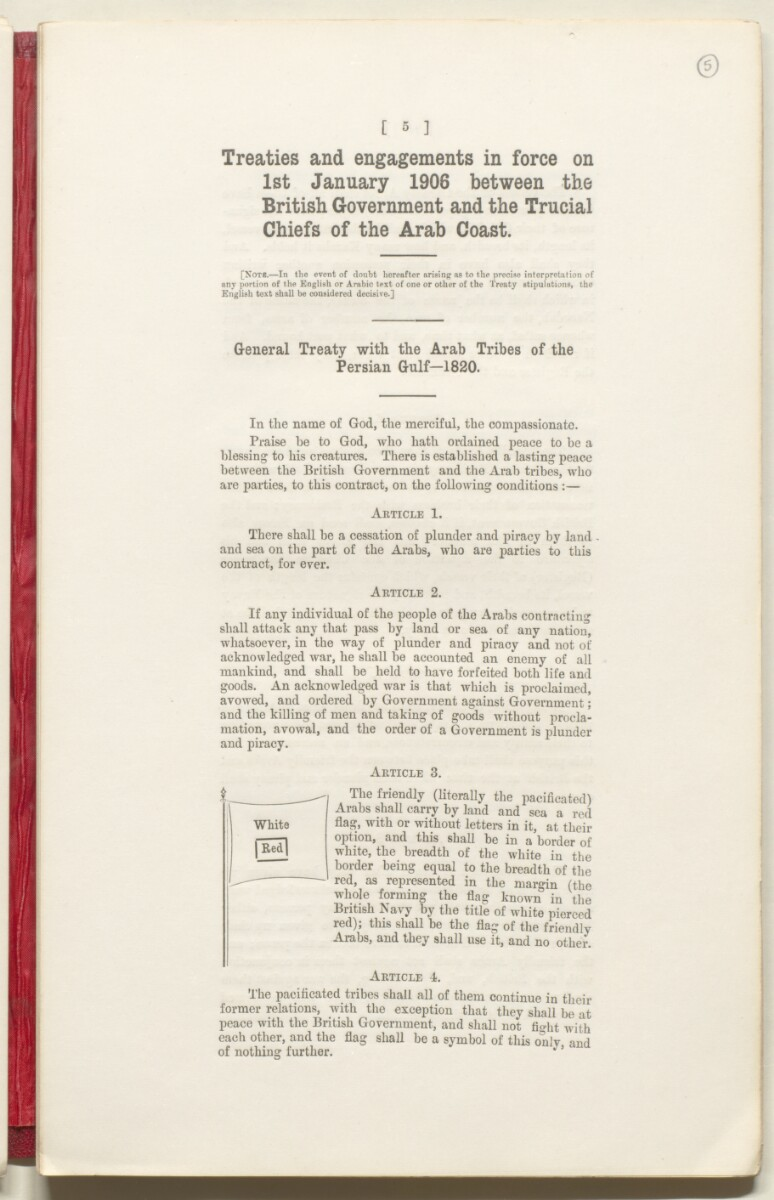
The General Treaty with the Arab Tribes of the Persian Gulf, 1820.

=== The British Protectorate and the Trucial States ===
The 1819 British attack was disastrous for the Qawasim. From then on, the British had political and military supremacy in the region, which lasted for 151 years. From the signing of the General Peace Treaty of 1820, to Britain's withdrawal from the Persian Gulf on 1 December 1971, Britain's role in the affairs of Ras Al Khaimah and other emirates was integral to the formation of the United Arab Emirates. Ras Al Khaimah remained under British occupation until July 1820, when the garrison of 800 soldiers left for the island of Qeshm.

A ten-year truce was eventually signed on 1 June 1843. This, in turn, led to the Perpetual Maritime Truce of 1853, which was signed on 4 May of that year. Sheikh Sultan signed as the “Chief of the Joasmees”, with the treaty committing the signatories, as well as their heirs and successors, to “conclude together a lasting and inviolable peace from this time forth in perpetuity”. From then on, this area, which was previously referred to as the ‘Pirate Coast’, came to be known as the Trucial Coast, and the tribal confederations were called the Trucial States.

=== Formation of the Federation ===
British involvement in the internal affairs of the Trucial States gradually increased over the twentieth century. During this time, Britain commissioned numerous expeditions to find oil, which led to the eventual discovery of oil, which increased the economic importance of the Trucial States.

The British had neglected the social and economic development of the Trucial States, which displease Sheikh Saqr, who sought to invest in Ras Al Khaimah's agricultural potential. The creation of a modern interstate transportation network increased connectivity and brought the seven states closer together, both physically and psychologically. It was one of many initiatives that promoted common cause among the leaders during the existence of the Trucial States Council and paved the way for the emergence of the United Arab Emirates.

=== Ras Al Khaimah and the Union ===
Britain announced its intention to withdraw from the Persian Gulf in 1971. This led to a series of political decisions that eventually led to the foundation of an independent, sovereign state.

The first steps towards unification were taken by Abu Dhabi and Dubai, when leaders Sheikh Zayed bin Sultan Al Nahyan and Sheikh Rashid bin Saeed Al Maktoum met at Al Sameeh on 18 February 1968 to sign the Union Accord, the document that laid the foundations for a federation.

Within a week, the rulers of Ras Al Khaimah, Sharjah, Umm Al Quwain, Ajman, Fujairah, Bahrain and Qatar were invited to join negotiations for the formation of a union. Between 25 and 27 February 1968, all nine leaders met in Dubai for discussions, which led to the signing of an eleven-point agreement that formed the basis of the ‘Federation of the Arab Emirates’.

Both Bahrain and Qatar eventually withdrew from the negotiations, and the remaining leaders of the seven Trucial States discussed the formation of a ‘Union of Arab Emirates’. On 10 July 1971, these rulers met in Dubai to resolve outstanding issues and move towards a final agreement. Sheikh Saqr was concerned with the nature of the Supreme Council, which he believed placed too much power in the hands of Abu Dhabi and Dubai. He was also angered at what he perceived to be a lack of support from the other leaders over the status of the Greater and Lesser Tumb islands. As a consequence, Sheikh Saqr declined to sign the Provisional Constitution, although he did not rule out the possibility of doing so in the future.

The other leaders agreed to a union and announced the formation of the United Arab Emirates on 18 July 1971. When the British left on 30 November, the foundation of an independent United Arab Emirates was formally proclaimed on 2 December 1971. The next two months were pivotal for Ras Al Khaimah as Sheikh Saqr knew that the emirate was a natural part of the union. So, on 9 February 1972, Sheikh Saqr called together the emirate's political leaders and told them that, for the sake of stability and confidence, the emirate either had to assume its own independence or consider itself a part of the union. By late evening, following a long discussion, a consensus was reached: Ras Al Khaimah would join the union and play its part at “the heart of the federation”.

== The Emirate in modern times ==
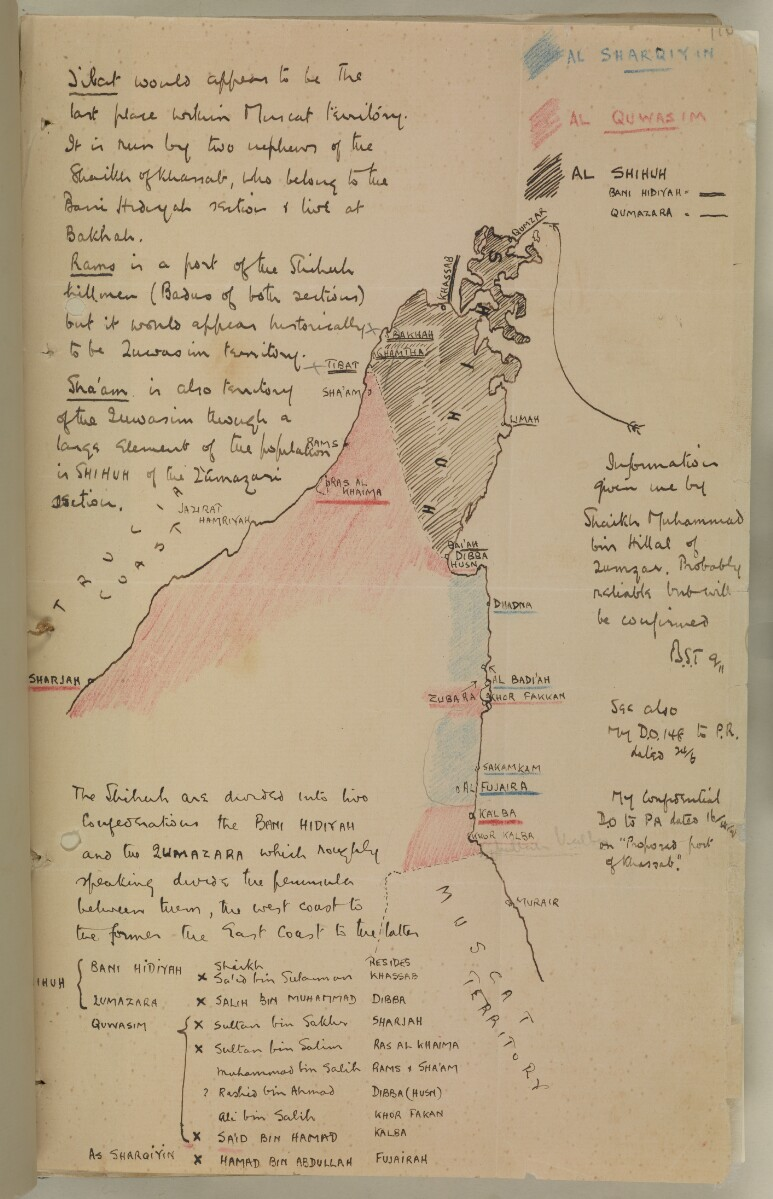
A map of the Musandam Peninsula by Bertram Thomas, showing the territories of the Trucial Chiefs, 1928.

=== Heritage and culture ===
Ras Al Khaimah's history, heritage and culture comes from its unique geographical features – mountains, coastal beaches, mangroves and the desert – along with its strategic location at the mouth of the Persian Gulf. It also has traditions and artforms, including folklore, folk music and dance, that have been passed on from one generation to the next that express the local social, ethical and aesthetic values.

=== Society ===
Ras Al Khaimah is mainly a tribal society, with most of its local population belonging to different tribes, be it mountain tribes, sea tribes and desert tribes. Each of these main tribes has several tribes under its ‘family name’, and they can be differentiated from one another due to their dialects. The people of Ras Al Khaimah, including the various tribes and the significant historical figures, have been a part of the rich history of the Emirate.

=== Health and education ===
Up until the formation of the UAE, Ras Al Khaimah's education and healthcare was rudimentary. There had been limited investment in either and the British failed to provide even the most basic educational and medical needs up until the 1950s. From the mid-1960s onwards, the emirate's healthcare provision has grown, with state-of-the-art hospitals that can provide the best medical care. These include Saqr Hospital, the Sheikh Khalifa Specialty Hospital, and RAK Hospital.

Education in the emirate also saw a similar evolution. Prior to the arrival of the emirate's first schools, education was the remit of a ‘mutawwa’ (teacher), who either taught at the local mosque or from their home. Sheikh Saqr was one of the first Trucial States rulers to turn education into a policy initiative, with the first schools built in the emirate with funding from Kuwait. By 1969, Ras Al Khaimah had eleven schools, six for boys and five for girls. Although illiteracy would remain high till the 1970s, schooling became universal and previously nomadic people settled in new villages where buses would collect their children for school each day. Today, the emirate's educational offering is world-class and ranges from public and private schools to the American University of Ras Al Khaimah.

=== Economy and tourism ===
Ras Al Khaimah also has a strong economy. Historically, agriculture and fisheries were the two main economic sectors in the emirate. However, the government has been focused on diversifying the economy over the past years. Now, the major economic sectors include tourism, real estate, building materials, manufacturing and hi-tech industry and service. The emirate provides a stable, attractive environment for investment. It recently established free zones and industrial areas which has attracted many foreign investments, which have also positively impacted its economy.

Tourism is one of the largest and fastest-growing economic sectors in Ras Al Khaimah. The emirate is home to numerous natural and historically significant sites – some of them UNESCO World Heritage sites – such as Shimal, Al Jazeera Al Hamra, Dhayah Fort, and so on. The Government of Ras Al Khaimah is strategically promoting them to boost tourism to the emirate. In 2019, Ras Al Khaimah received an estimated 1.12 million tourists, up from just about 500,000 in 2007.

Furthermore, until 2027, Ras Al Khaimah will keep boosting economy and tourism by opening the first casino in the area, the Wynn Al Marjan Island luxury resort and casino with a multi-billion dollar investment of US$3.9 billion.

== See also ==
- Piracy in the Persian Gulf
