= Phoenix Air Phoenix =

Czech motoglider

Phoenix
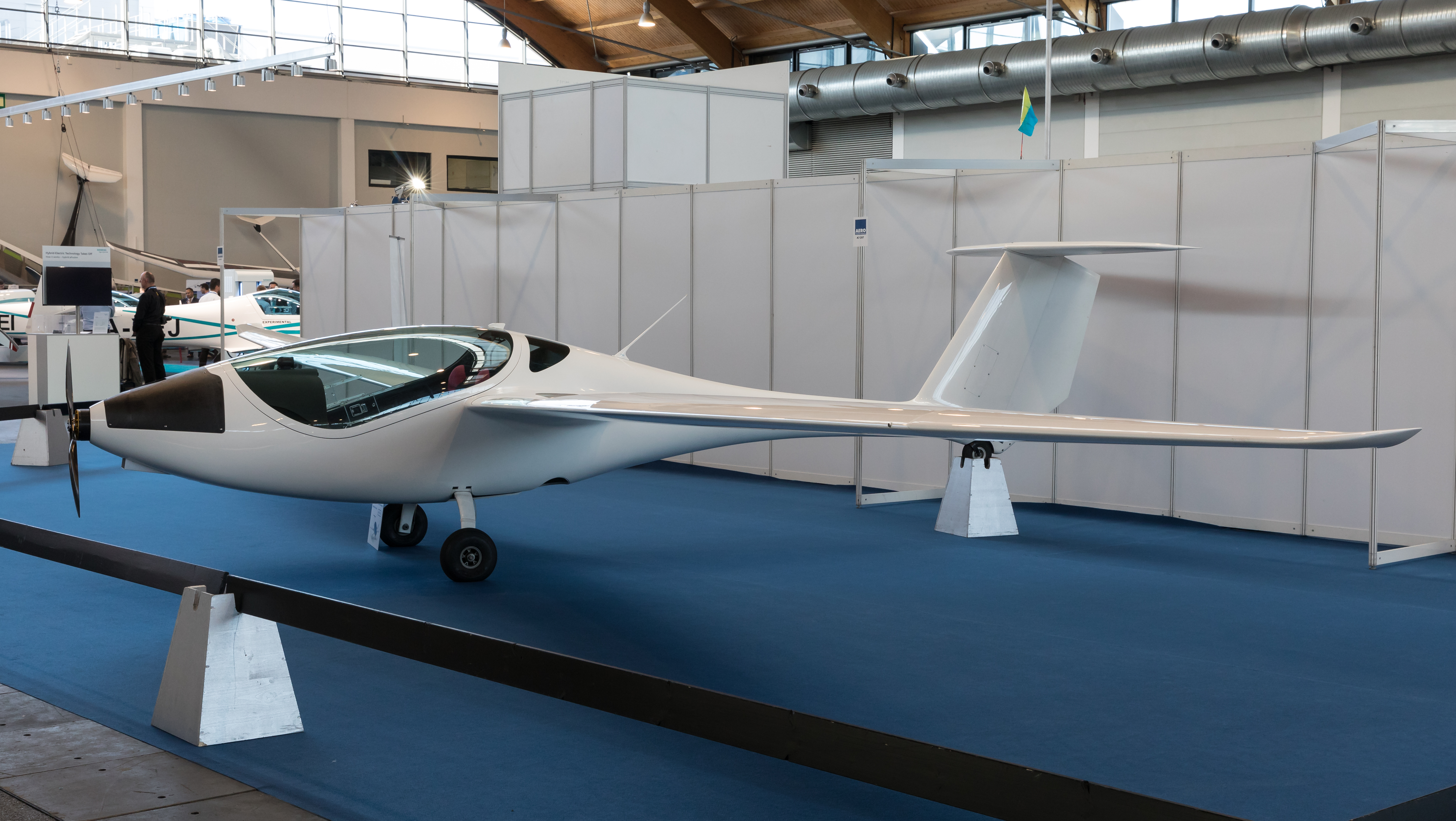
- A Phoenix Air Phoenix 35 ft span at AERO Friedrichshafen 2018

General information
- Type: Motor glider
- National origin: Czech Republic
- Manufacturer: Phoenix Air
- Status: In production (2012)

History
- Developed from: Urban Air Lambada

The Phoenix Air Phoenix is a Czech shoulder-wing, two-seat motor glider, designed and produced by Phoenix Air and provided as a complete ready-to-fly aircraft.

== Design and development ==
The Phoenix is a derivative of the Urban Air Lambada motorglider, developed by Martin Stepaneck who was formerly with Urban Air before that company's demise. The Phoenix was designed to comply with the Fédération Aéronautique Internationale microlight rules and US light-sport aircraft rules. It features a cantilever wing, a T-tail, a two-seats-in-side-by-side configuration enclosed cockpit under a bubble canopy, fixed conventional landing gear and a single engine in tractor configuration.

The aircraft is made from composites. Its 15 m (49.2 ft) span wing is convertible to 11 m (36.1 ft), by removing the wing tips and then re-installing shorter tips and the winglets for faster cruising speed when flying as a microlight. With the wing tips removed it has a wingspan of 10.4 m (34.1 ft) for storage. Standard engines available are the 80 hp (60 kW) Rotax 912UL, the 100 hp (75 kW) Rotax 912ULS, 85 hp (63 kW) Jabiru 2200 and the 60 hp (45 kW) HKS 700E four-stroke powerplants. With the 912S engine the aircraft can be employed as a glider tug. An electric-powered version is under development.

The European version has a gross weight of 472.5 kg (1,042 lb), while the LSA version has a gross weight of 600 kg (1,323 lb). The design appears on the Federal Aviation Administration's list of approved special light-sport aircraft.

== Specifications (Phoenix) ==
Data from World Directory of Leisure Aviation 2011-12 and Phoenix Air

General characteristics

- Crew: one
- Capacity: one passenger
- Length: 6.50 m (21 ft 4 in)
- Wingspan: 15 m (49 ft 3 in)
- Height: 1.45 m (4 ft 9 in)
- Empty weight: 295 kg (650 lb)
- Gross weight: 472.5 kg (1,042 lb)
- Powerplant: 1 × Rotax 912UL four cylinder, liquid and air-cooled, four stroke aircraft engine, 60 kW (80 hp)

Performance

- Cruise speed: 240 km/h (150 mph, 130 kn)
- Stall speed: 65 km/h (40 mph, 35 kn)
- Never exceed speed: 260 km/h (160 mph, 140 kn)
- Maximum glide ratio: 32:1 (35:1 when equipped with the HKS 700E powerplant)
- Rate of sink: 0.80 m/s (157 ft/min)

== See also ==
- List of gliders
