= Wadi Rahabah =

Wadi in the UAE

Wadi Rahabah Wādī Raḩbah
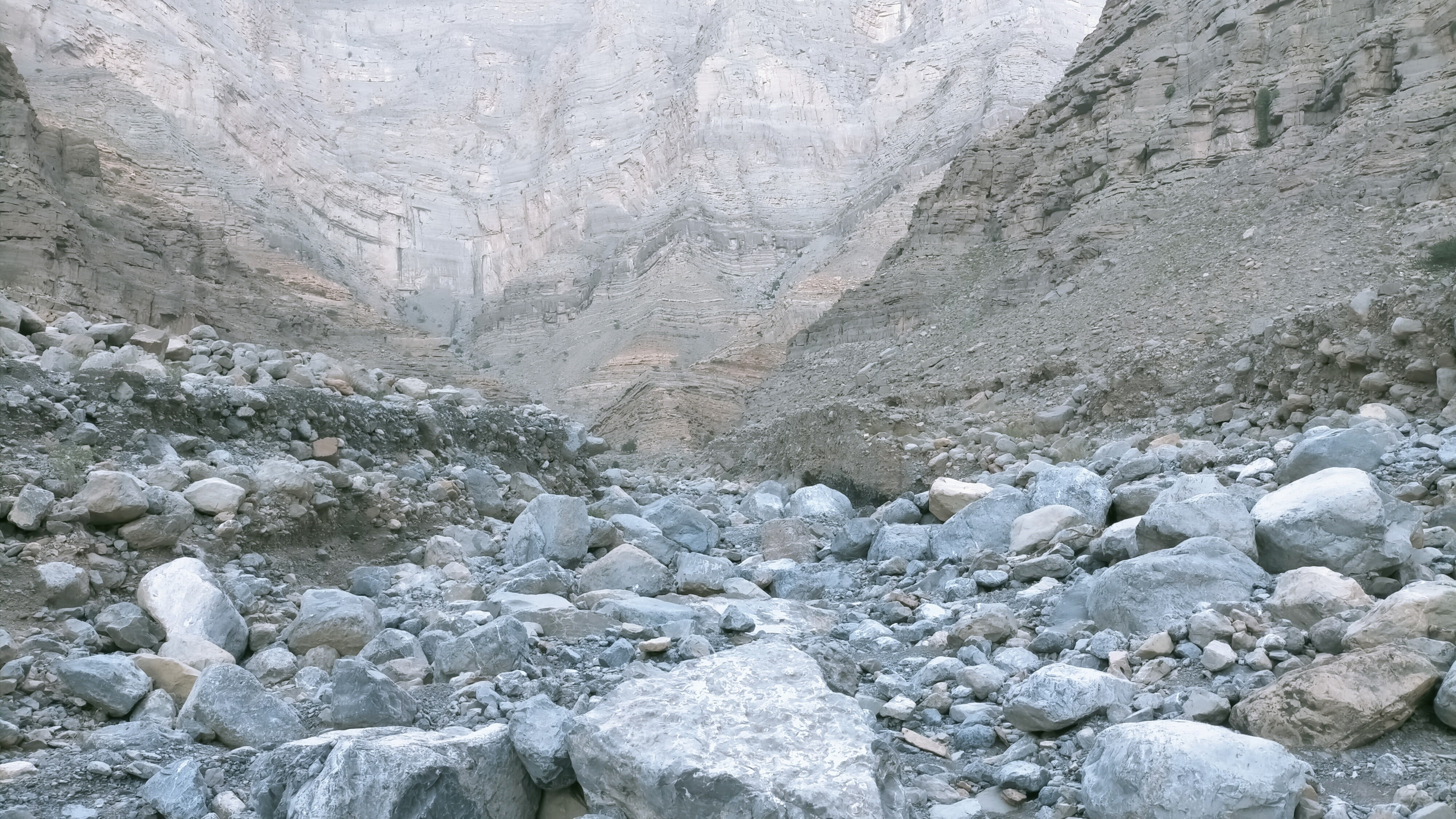
- View of the middle course of the Wadi Rahabah

- Location within United Arab Emirates Location within Persian Gulf Location within West and Central Asia
- Native name: وادي رحبة (Arabic)

Location
- Country: United Arab Emirates
- Emirate: Ras Al Khaimah

Physical characteristics
- Source: Western slope of Jabal Rahabah, in the Emirate of Ras Al Khaimah
  - elevation: 1,350 m (4,430 ft)
- Mouth: Inlet and coastal wetland of Khawr Hulaylah, located in the Persian Gulf, next to the town of Seih Al Qurum (Qurm)
  - coordinates: 25°55′32.0″N 56°03′02.0″E
  - elevation: 0 m (0 ft)
- Length: 7 km (4.3 mi)
- Basin size: 12.42 km^{2} (4.80 mi^{2})

Basin features
- River system: Wadi Rahabah
- Tributaries
  - right: Wadi Zireb

Wadi Rahabah (Arabic: وادي رحبة, romanized: Wādī Raḩbah), is a dry valley or river with intermittent flow, which flows almost exclusively during the rainy season, located in the northeast of the United Arab Emirates, in the Emirate of Ras Al Khaimah.

It forms its own drainage basin, with an approximate area of 12.42 km^{2} (4.80 mi^{2}), to the north, it limits with the drainage basins of wadis and smaller ravines that pour their waters directly into the Persian Gulf and with the sub-basin of the Wadi Halhal, a tributary of the Wadi Ghalilah; to the east and southeast, with the Wadi Jib sub-basin, a tributary of the Wadi Shah / Wadi Shehah; to the south with the Wadi Bakhit basin; and to the west with the inlet and coastal wetland of Khawr Hulaylah, into which it flows, located in the Persian Gulf, next to the town of Seih Al Qurum (Qurm), northwest of the town of Kabdah, and north of the city of Ar Rams.

The source of the main channel of the Wadi Rahabah is located approximately 1,350 m (4,430 ft) altitude on the western slope of Jabal Rahabah (1,543 m (5,062 ft)), one of the highest mountains in the country, almost at the foot of the Rahabah South Col (1,470 m (4,820 ft)), on the Jabal ar Rahrah Ridge.

A short distance from the wall of the great cliff that forms the western slope of Jabal Rahabah, are the ruins of an old village, with numerous dry stone constructions, and there is a small spring.

== Course ==
The main course of the Wadi Rahabah flows from east to west, receiving in its path the contribution of several ravines and tributary wadis, to the left and right, of which the most relevant, due to its flow and length, is the Wadi Zireb, tributary on the right, whose mouth occurs very shortly before the dam built in 2021 (Rahba Dam), intended to feed underground water resources and reduce damage due to eventual floods.

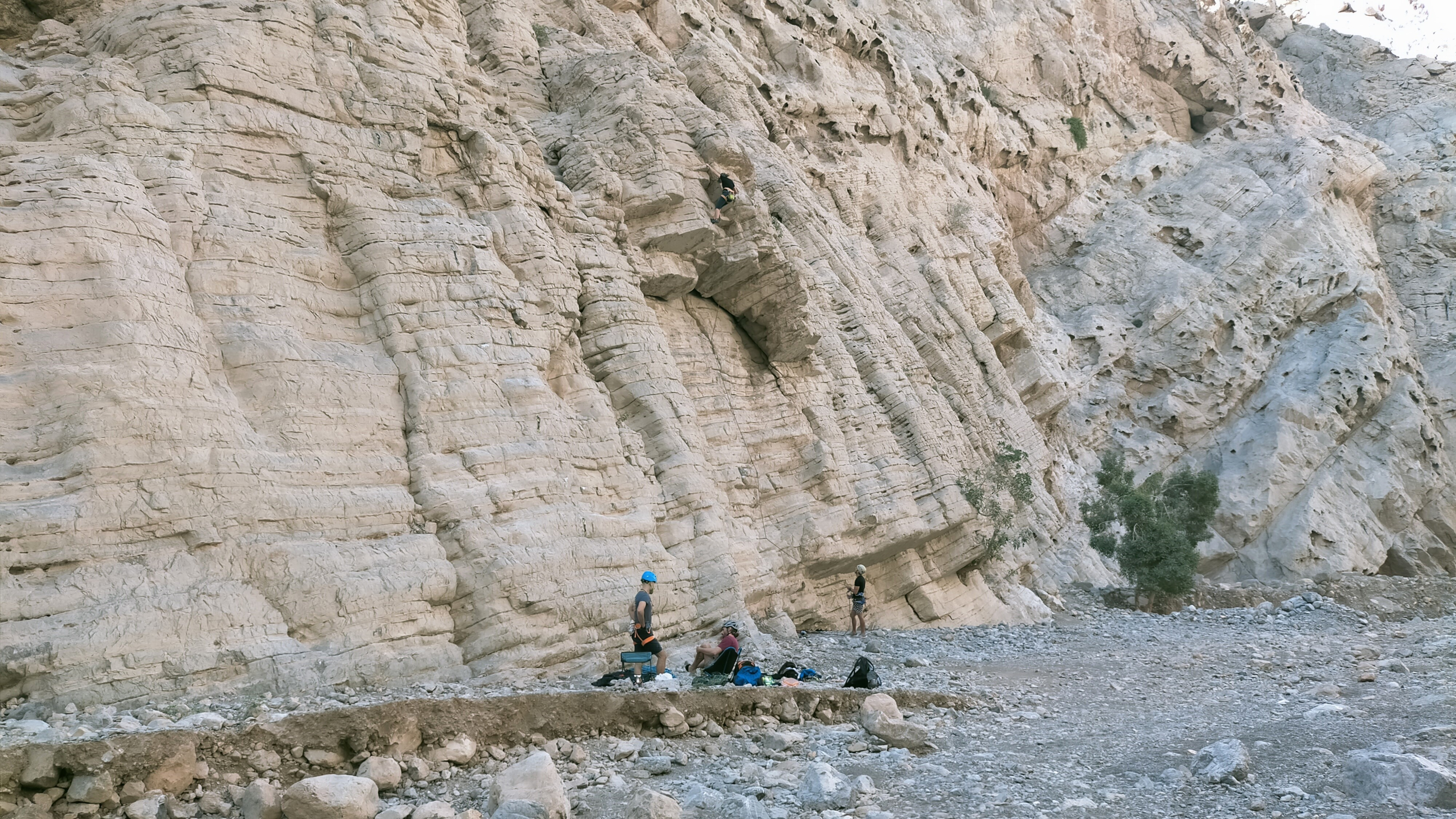
Stardust Climbing Crag. Rock climbing area in the middle reaches of Wadi Rahabah

In the middle course of the wadi there is an area of cliffs, known as Stardust Climbing Crag, frequently used for rock climbing and a picturesque cave (Wadi Rahabah Cave), located a short distance from the bed, which receives the attention of numerous tourists and other visitors.

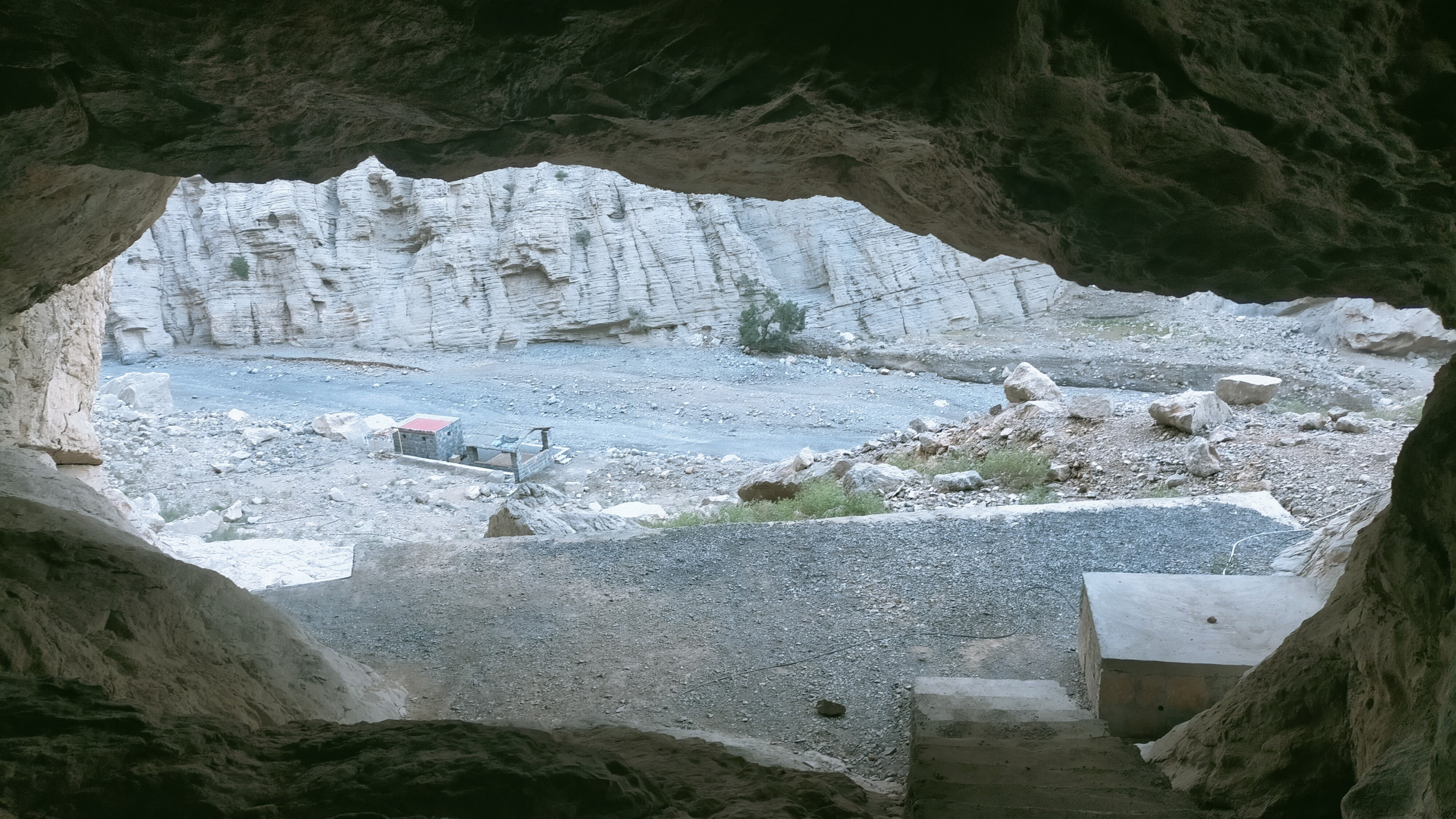
Wadi Rahabah Cave. Cave in the middle course of the wadi

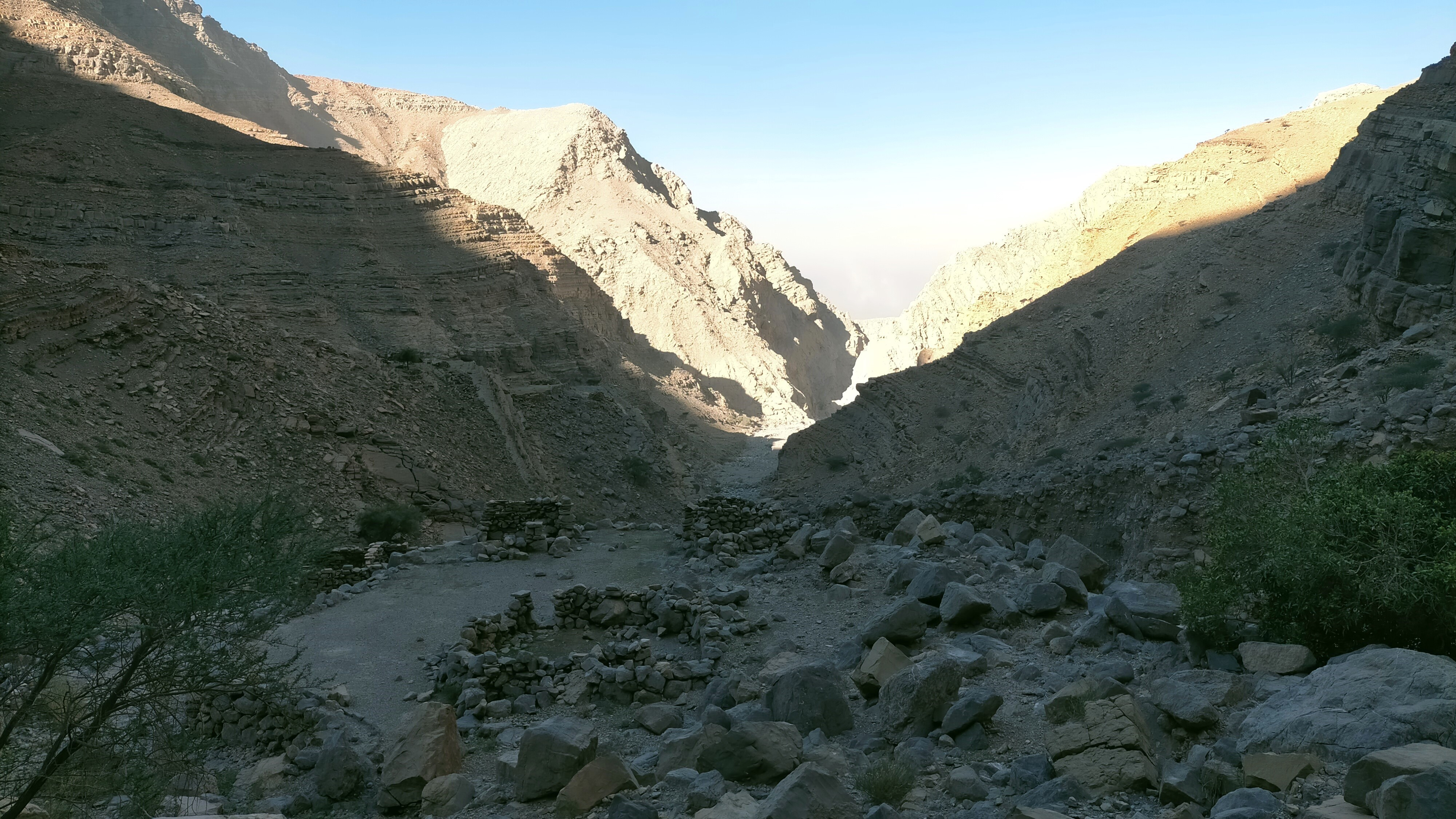
Wadi Rahabah / Wadi Rahbah. Ruins of an old town, in the upper course of the wadi

== Toponymy ==
Alternative names: Wadi Rahabah, Wadi Rahbah, Wadi Al Rahba, Wādī Raḩabah, Wādī Raḩbah, Wadi Ruhaba, Wadi Rahba

The name of this wadi appears mentioned in documents and maps prepared between 1950 and 1960 by the British Arabist, cartographer, military officer and diplomat Julian F. Walker, and in many other documents related to the work carried out to establish borders between the then called Trucial States, later completed by the United Kingdom´s Ministry of Defense, on 1:100,000 scale maps published in 1971.

In the National Atlas of the United Arab Emirates it is identified with the spelling Wādī Raḩbah.

== Population ==
In addition to some modern farms, the remains of two old villages are preserved along the course of the Wadi Rahabah: one next to the mouth of the Wadi Zireb, the left tributary of the Wadi Rahabah, and a second village located almost at the foot of the great cliffs which forms the Jabal Rahabah in the upper course of the wadi.

The entire area near the Wadi Rahabah and its tributaries was mainly populated by the semi-nomadic Shihuh tribe, section of Bani Shatair, and corresponded to the tribal area of Mahabib, which in recent years has been practically devastated by intensive open pit mining, from the neighboring Stevin Rock quarry, property of the Emirate of Ras al Khaimah.

== See also ==
- List of wadis of the United Arab Emirates
- List of mountains in the United Arab Emirates
- List of wadis of Oman
- List of mountains in Oman
