= Distar Air =

- Company type: Privately held company
- Industry: Aerospace
- Headquarters: Ústí nad Orlicí, Czech Republic
- Products: Light aircraft
- Owner: Společnost DISTAR CZ a.s.
- Website: www.distar.cz/en/

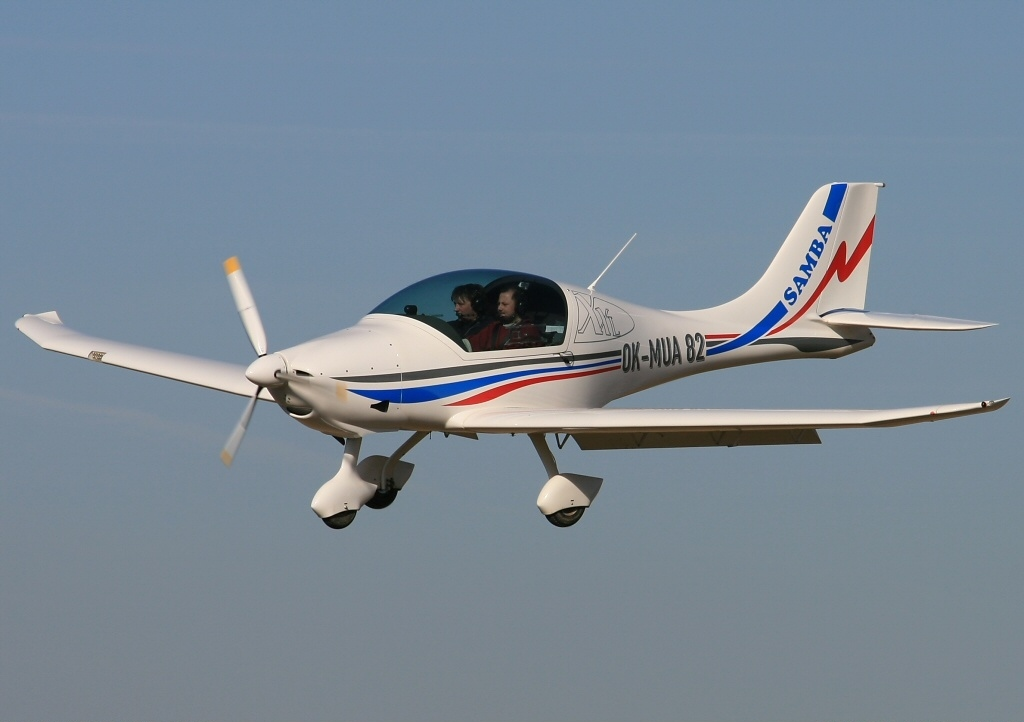
Distar Samba XXL

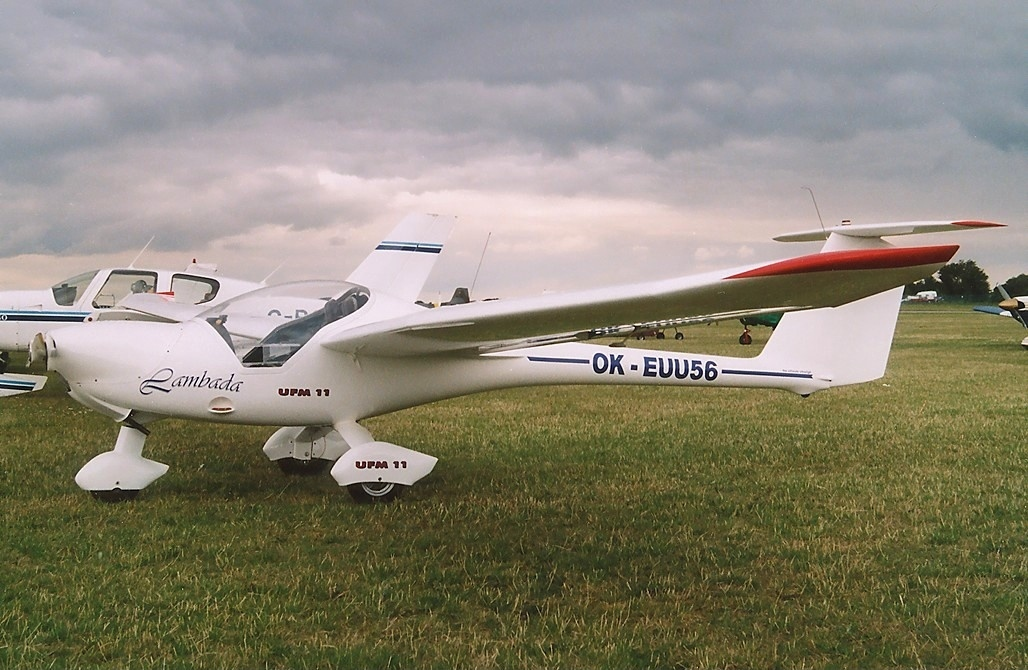
Distar UFM-13 Lambada

Distar Air is a Czech aircraft manufacturer based in Ústí nad Orlicí. The company specializes in the design and manufacture of light aircraft in the form of kits for amateur construction as well as ready-to-fly aircraft.

Distar Air was formed to continue the production of Urban Air designs, including the Distar Samba XXL touring aircraft and the Distar UFM-13 Lambada motorglider.

The company is owned by Společnost DISTAR CZ a.s., a diversified manufacturing concern that also produces machinery, engines and stone quarrying.

Distar Air licensed production of the Samba to Airo Aviation in Dubai who produced the aircraft as the Airo 5.

== Aircraft ==
Summary of aircraft built by Distar Air
Model name	First flight	Number built	Type
Distar UFM-13 Lambada			motorglider
Distar Samba XXL	1999	circa 80 by 2009	light touring aircraft
