= Airo Aviation =

United Arab Emirates ultralight aircraft manufacturer

Airo Aviation FZ-LLC
- Company type: Limited liability company
- Industry: Aerospace
- Founded: 2006
- Fate: Out of business
- Headquarters: Ras Al Khaimah Free Trade Zone, United Arab Emirates
- Products: Ultralight aircraft
- Website: www.airoaviation.com

Airo Aviation FZ-LLC was an Emirati aircraft manufacturer based in the Ras Al Khaimah Free Trade Zone. The company specialized in the manufacture of ultralight aircraft in the form of ready-to-fly aircraft for the European Fédération Aéronautique Internationale microlight category.

The company was incorporated in 2006 to produce sport aircraft in the United Arab Emirates for the European market using German certification. The company used modern numerical control manufacturing machinery.

By early 2019 the company website domain was for sale and the company has likely ceased operations.

The AiroAV company produced two designs. The Airo 1, a licensed development of the Italian Euro Ala JetFox microlight and the Airo 5 fibreglass two seat light touring aircraft, a licensed version of the Urban Air Samba. Both aircraft were intended for the US light-sport aircraft market, but as of September 2016 neither appeared on the Federal Aviation Administration's list of approved LSAs.

== Aircraft ==
Summary of aircraft built by Airo Aviation
Model name	First flight	Number built	Type
Airo 1			Two seat microlight aircraft, based on the Euro Ala JetFox
Airo 5			Two seat fibreglass microlight aircraft, licensed version of the Urban Air Samba
