= Distar UFM-13 Lambada =

Czech motorglider

UFM-13 Lambada
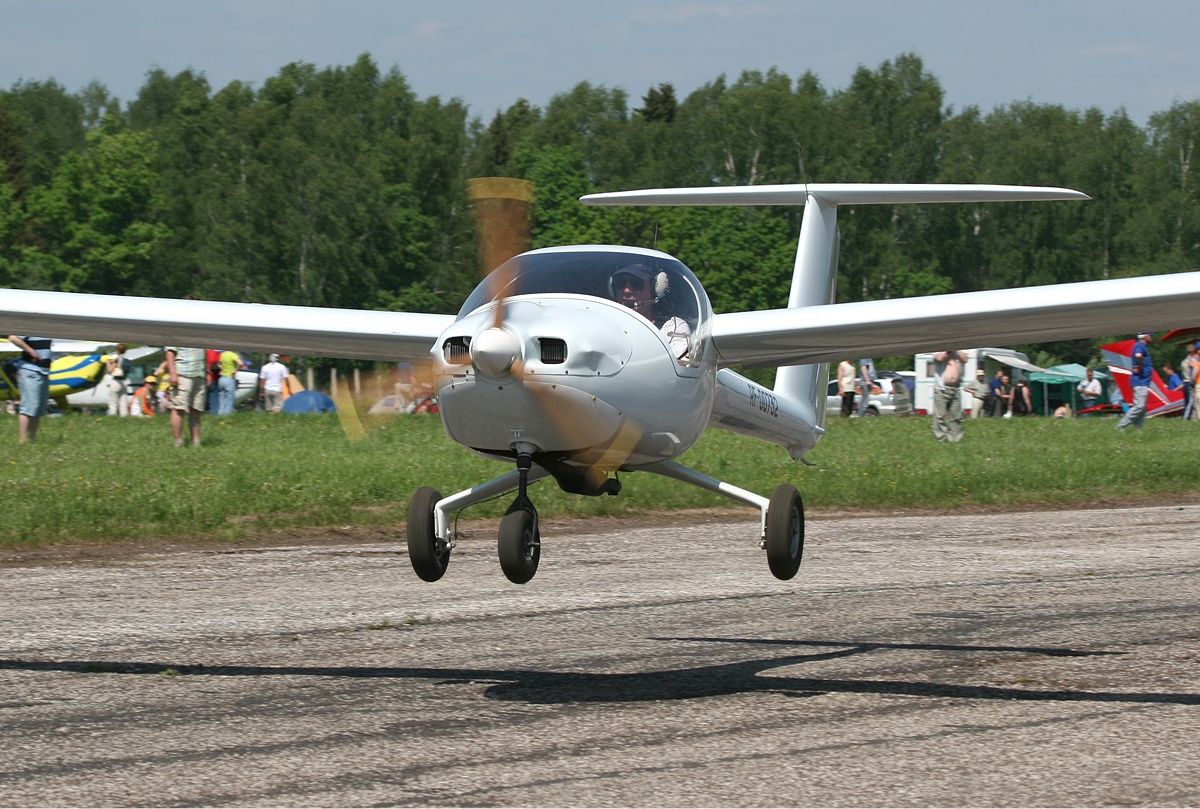
- Lambada tri-gear

General information
- Type: Motorglider; Glider tug
- National origin: Czech Republic
- Manufacturer: Urban Air; Distar Air
- Status: In production (2012)

History
- Variant: Phoenix Air Phoenix

The Distar UFM-13 Lambada (named for the Brazilian dance) is a Czech shoulder-wing, two-seat motor glider originally designed and produced by Urban Air and now built by Distar Air of Ústí nad Orlicí.

== Design and development ==
The Lambada was designed to comply with the Fédération Aéronautique Internationale microlight rules at a gross weight of 472.5 kg (1,042 lb) and US light-sport aircraft rules at 600 kg (1,323 lb). The design is on the Federal Aviation Administration's list of approved special light-sport aircraft.

The aircraft features a cantilever wing, a T-tail, a two-seat side-by-side enclosed cockpit under a bubble canopy, fixed tricycle or conventional landing gear with a steerable tail wheel and a single engine in tractor configuration.

The aircraft is made from composites. Its 13 m (42.7 ft) span wing employs a SM 701 airfoil, has an area of 12.16 m^{2} (130.9 sq ft) and flaperons with spoilers or optionally ailerons and dive brakes. Flaperon settings are 0°, 5°, 9° and 16°, with the last setting assisted by the spoilers. The wings can be extended to 15 m (49.2 ft) with wing tips for soaring. The main landing gear legs are fabricated from fibreglass laminates and the wheels are equipped with single lever hydraulic brakes. Standard engines available are the 80 hp (60 kW) Rotax 912UL and the 85 hp (63 kW) Jabiru 2200 four-stroke powerplants.

The aircraft achieves a 26:1 glide ratio with 13 m wings and 30:1 with 15 m wings fitted. Aside from its use as a motorglider, the Lambada has also been successfully employed as a glider tug.

== Specifications (UFM-13 Lambada) ==
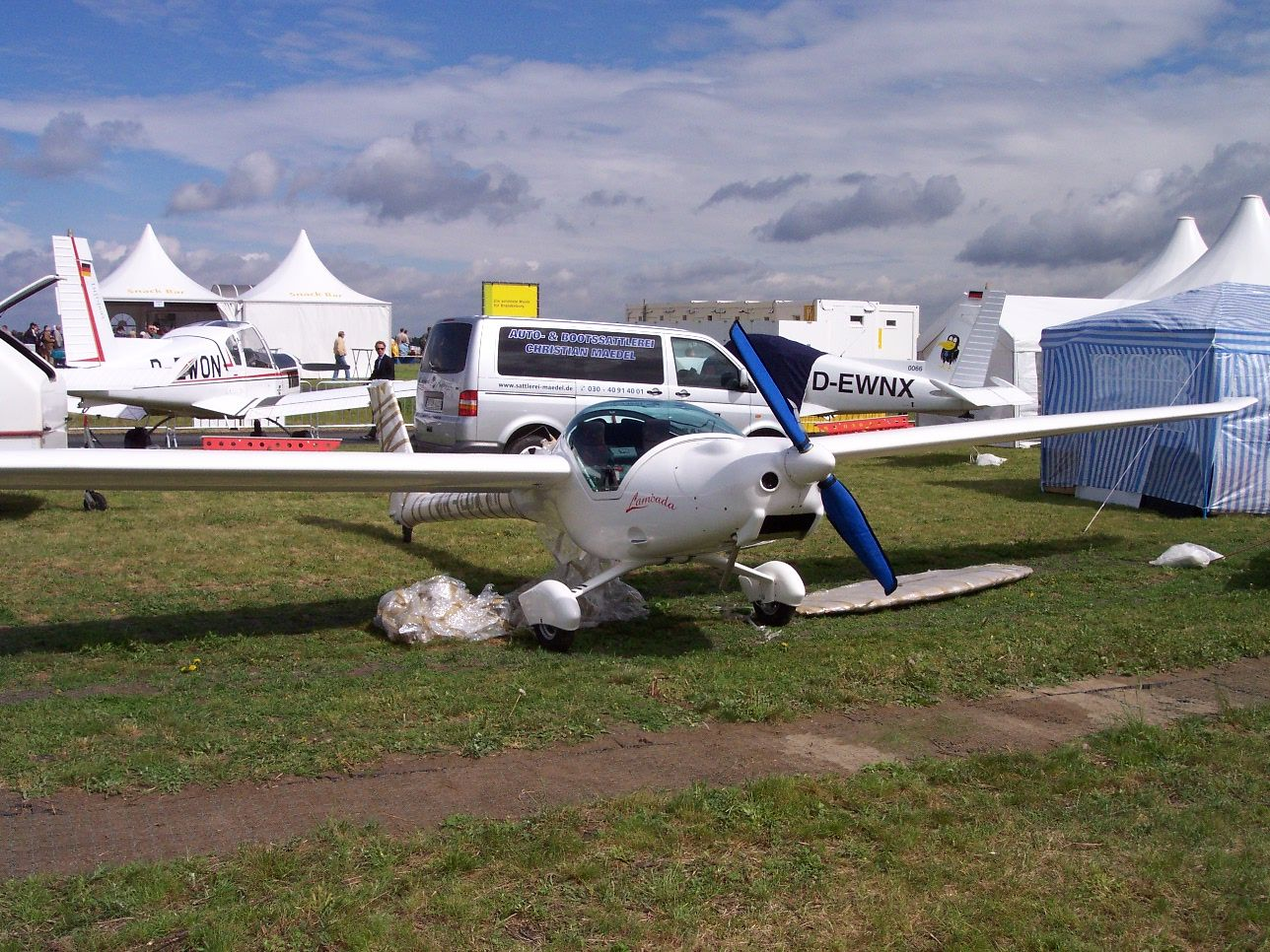
UFM-13 Lambada taildragger

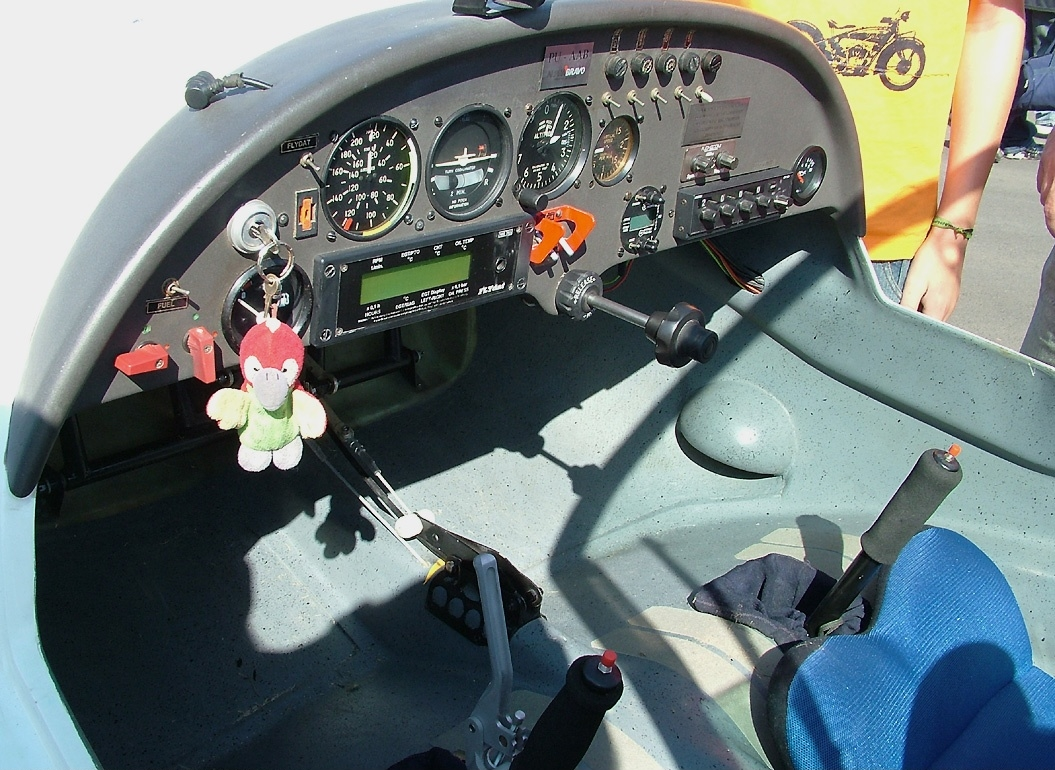
UFM-13 Lambada cockpit

Data from World Directory of Leisure Aviation 2011-12 and Distar

General characteristics

- Crew: one
- Capacity: one passenger
- Length: 6.6 m (21 ft 8 in)
- Wingspan: 13 m (42 ft 8 in) standard, 15 m (49.2 ft) with optional wing tips
- Height: 1.95 m (6 ft 5 in)
- Wing area: 12.16 m^{2} (130.9 sq ft)
- Empty weight: 285 kg (628 lb)
- Gross weight: 472.5 kg (1,042 lb)
- Fuel capacity: 100 litres (22 imp gal; 26 US gal) in two 50 litres (11 imp gal; 13 US gal) tanks
- Powerplant: 1 × Rotax 912ULS four cylinder, liquid and air-cooled, four stroke aircraft engine, 75 kW (101 hp)
- Propellers: 2-bladed composite, fully feathering

Performance

- Cruise speed: 150 km/h (93 mph, 81 kn)
- Stall speed: 64 km/h (40 mph, 35 kn)
- Never exceed speed: 200 km/h (120 mph, 110 kn)
- Maximum glide ratio: 26:1 with 13 m wings, 30:1 with 15 m wings
- Rate of climb: 7 m/s (1,400 ft/min)
- Rate of sink: 1.1 m/s (220 ft/min)
- Wing loading: 38.9 kg/m^{2} (8.0 lb/sq ft)

== See also ==
- List of gliders
