= Al Mataf =

- Location within United Arab Emirates
- Coordinates: 25.842961°N 55.996812°E
- Country: United Arab Emirates
- Emirate: Ras al-Khaimah
- Elevation: 19 m (62 ft)

Al Mataf is the name of a suburb of Ras Al Khaimah.
