= Urban Air =

- Company type: Private company
- Industry: Aerospace
- Founded: 1998
- Founder: George Hackett
- Defunct: circa 2010
- Headquarters: Ústí nad Orlicí, Czech Republic
- Number of employees: 40
- Website: www.urbanair.cz

Urban Air was an aircraft manufacturer based in the Czech Republic.

The company was a manufacturer of light sport and ultralight aircraft and employed 40 people. The company was founded in 1998 by five partners. Their first prototype made its inaugural flight in May 1996, thus pre-dating the company by two years. It had been in the design and production stages since 1992, when Pavel Urban, Karel Faltus, and Ing. Miloš Mládek started design. They were also assisted by Schempp-Hirth.

Production of the company's designs was taken up by Distar Air of Ústí nad Orlicí, Czech Republic.

== Aircraft ==
Urban Air designed and built two aircraft types, the Lambada and the Samba. Both can be equipped with a tow hook to tow gliders aloft. In addition, parachute recovery systems are an option. The aircraft are made of fiberglass and carbon fiber composite materials. They are designed so as to be quickly disassembled and trailered for ground transport.

Lambada
The Lambada, officially called the UFM 13 Lambada, was the company's first airplane. It had been in design stages since 1992, and the prototype's first flight was on 23 May 1996. The design was based on that of gliders so as to enhance performance. The aircraft comes with wing extenders that increase the wingspan to 15 meters. It also has flaps and spoilers. It is a single-engine, taildragger monoplane.

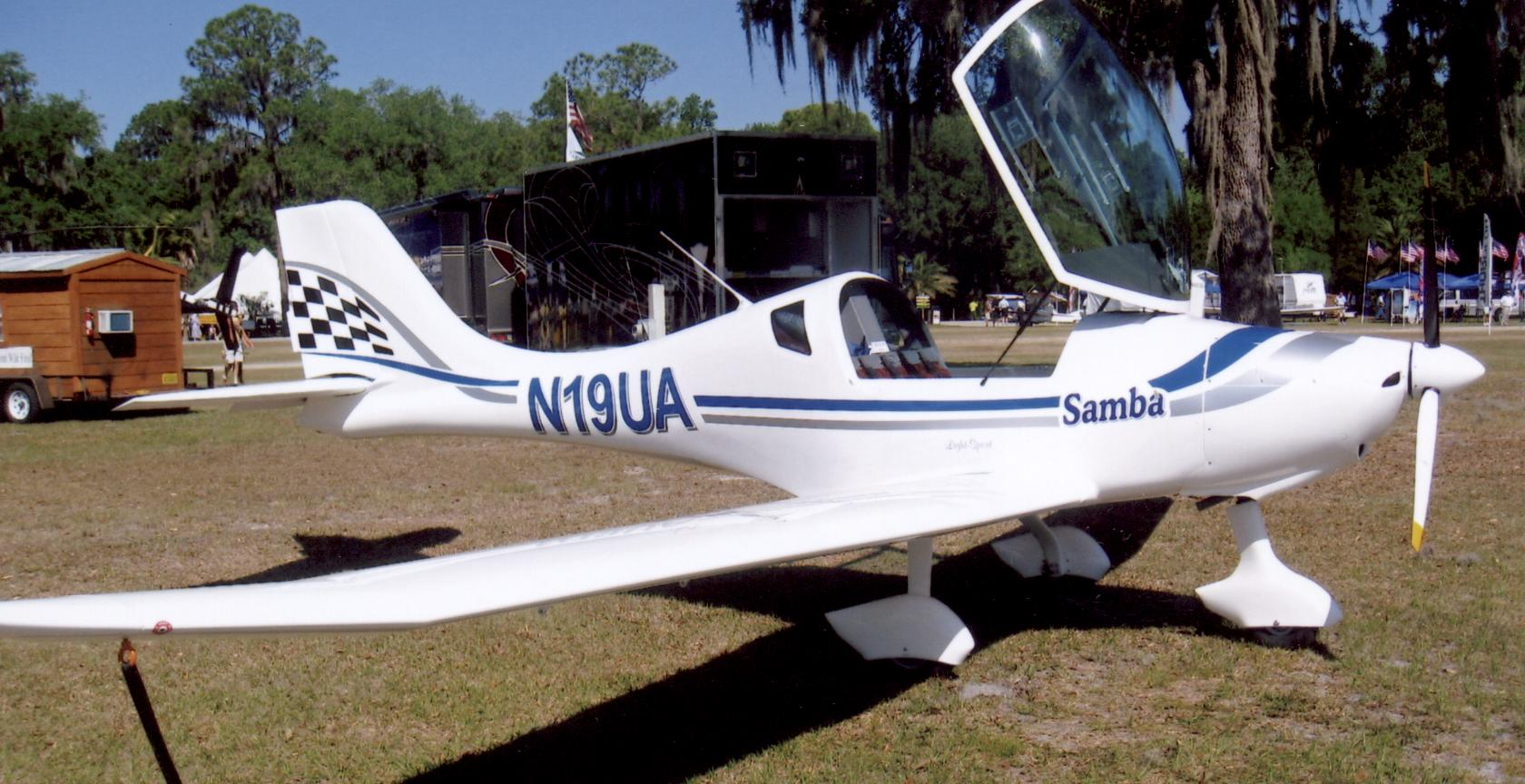
Urban Air Samba XXL, built in 2008, displayed at the Sun n' Fun show at Lakeland Florida in April 2009

Samba
The Samba was the company's second aircraft. It took off on its first test flight in June 1999. It is made primarily of carbon laminate. The Samba is, like the Lambada, a single-engine monoplane, but has tricycle gear instead of the traditional taildragger gear. An improved version, the Samba XXL has been in production since 2004.

== See also ==
- Light aircraft manufacturers in the Czech Republic
