= Euro-ALA Jet Fox =

Jet Fox
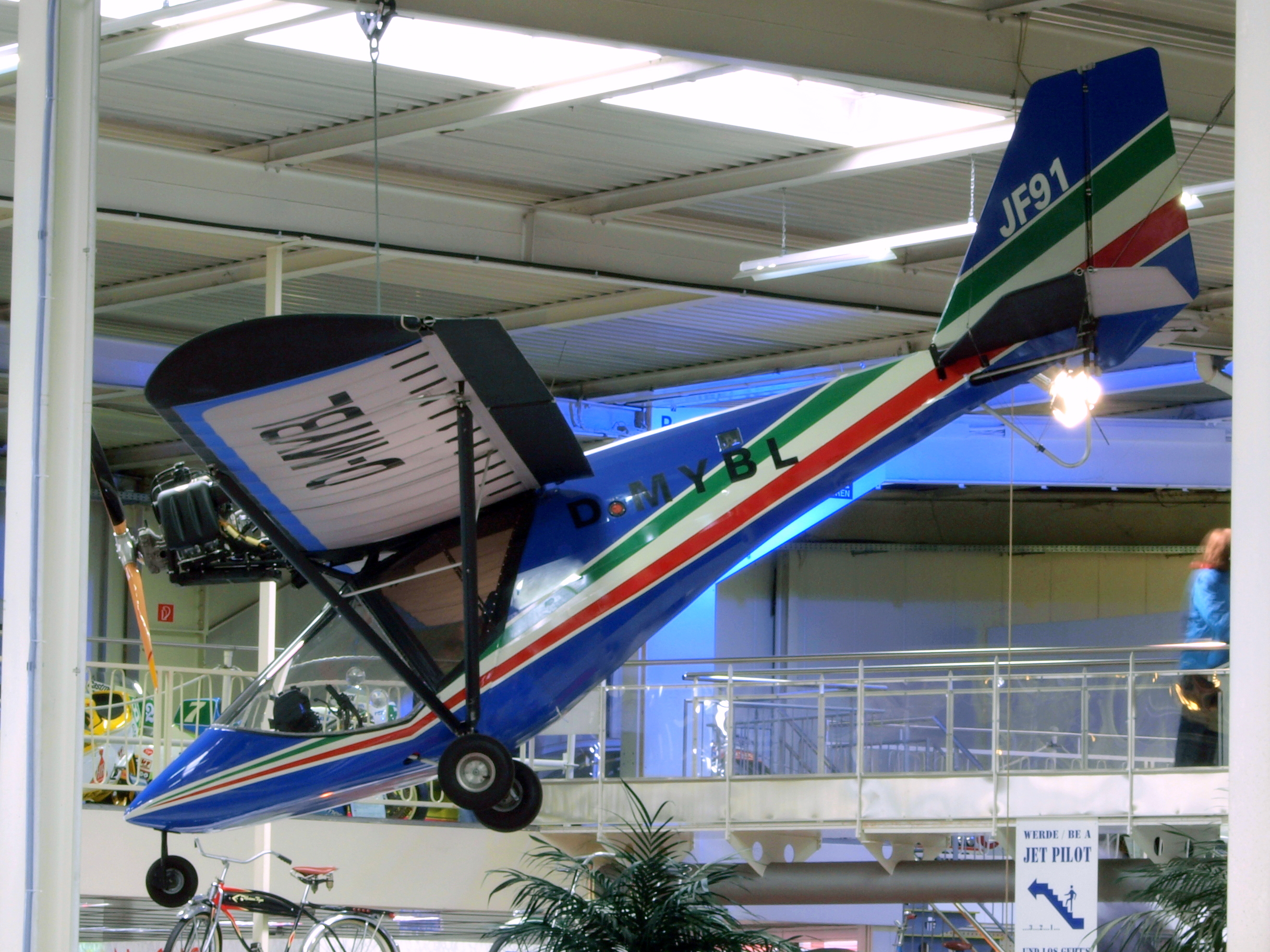

General information
- Type: Two-seat ultralight
- National origin: Italy
- Manufacturer: Euro-ALA
- Designer: Alfredo Di Cesare
- Number built: 280 by 2010

History
- First flight: 1991
- Developed into: Airo 1

The Euro-ALA Jet Fox is an Italian single-engine ultralight aircraft, seating two in side-by-side configuration. Production began in the early 1990s, with 280 sold by 2010.

== Design and development ==
The Jet Fox is a high wing aircraft, its deep side-by-side cabin and relatively slender rear fuselage giving it a pod-and-boom appearance. The parallel chord, fabric covered wing, mounted over the cabin is braced with a pair of narrow, V-form lift struts from the lower forward fuselage. The wings fold for transport. The fuselage has a tubular metal structure within a carbon fibre shell. The cabin is fully enclosed, with two large transparent doors. The Jet Fox has a short legged tricycle undercarriage, with spatted mainwheels on cantilever legs fixed to the fuselage at the same point as the lift struts; it sits quite tail high on the ground. Tail surfaces are conventional, with a swept, straight tapered fin and rudder. The Rotax engine is tractor mounted above and forward of the wing, projecting over the cabin. Two engine choices are available, a 64 hp (48 kW) Rotax 582 or an 80 hp (60 kW) Rotax 912 UL.

The original Jet Fox 91 first flew in 1991, with 140 sold by 1993. It was followed by the Jet Fox 97, which first flew on 10 March 1997 and had a fully cowled engine. Later improvements included better soundproofing. By 2010, 280 examples of all models had been sold. A proposed version with aluminium skinned wings, Fowler flaps and with easier access to a wider cabin was not proceeded with. An amphibious floatplane version appeared at Sun 'n' Fun 2006, fitted with a 100 hp (75 kW) Rotax 912S engine.

In 2010 a deal between Euro-ALA and Aircraft Holdings, a Malaysian company, formed Euroala Industries Sdn Bhd to acquire all production and design right and to move Jet Fox production to a site near Kuala Lumpur where labour costs are lower than in Italy.

== Aircraft on display ==
A Jet Fox 91D is on display in the Auto und Technik Museum, Sinsheim, Germany.

== Variants ==
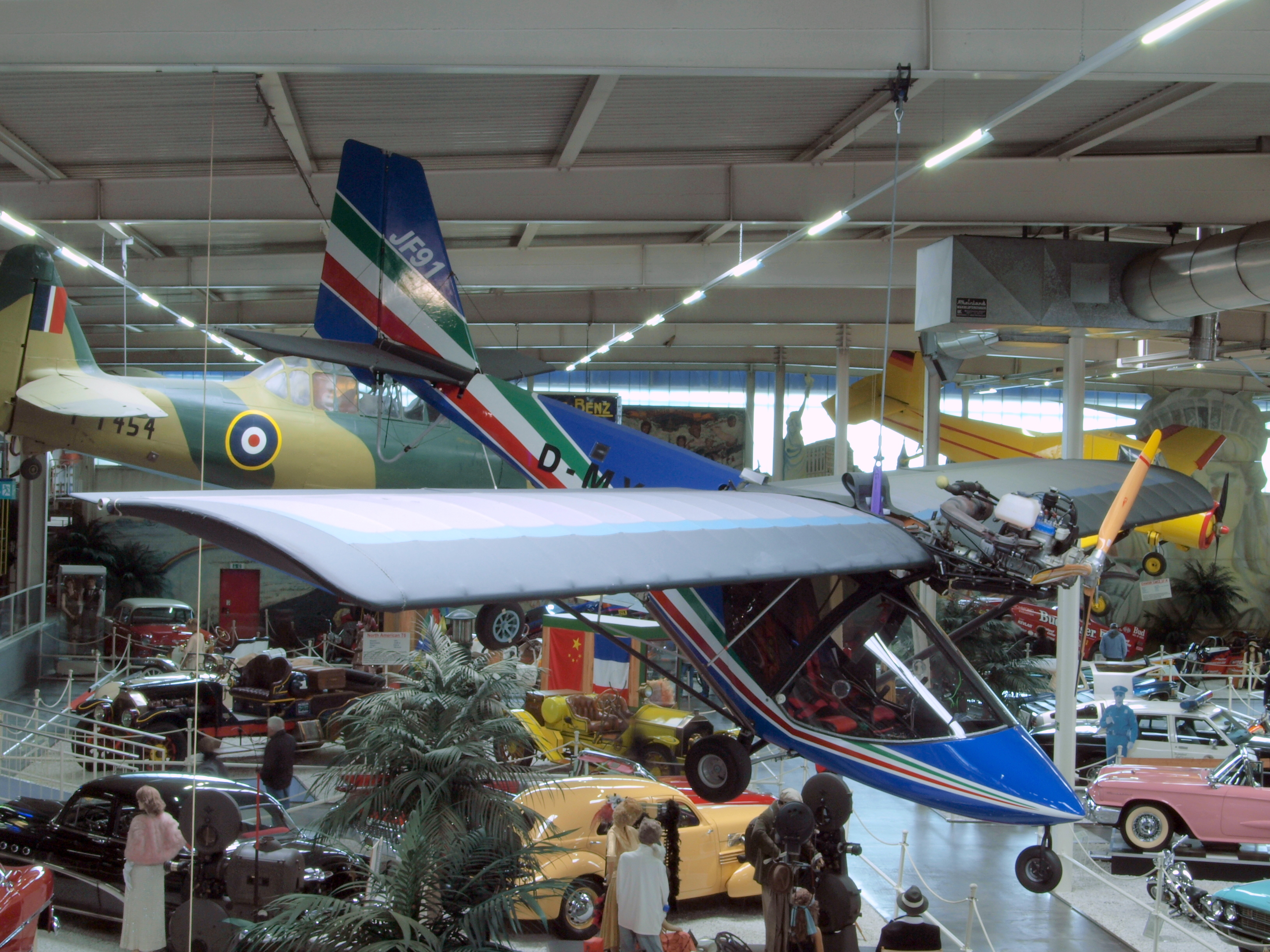
JetFox JF91

Data from Jane's All the World's Aircraft

Jet Fox 91
Initial 1991 version. 140 built.
Jet Fox 97
Improved (engine cowling, sound proofing) introduced 1997. 140 built, including current versions.

Current versions, based on Jet Fox 97

Jet Fox Amphib
US amphibian version with 73.5 kW (98.6 hp) Rotax 912 ULS. Maximum take off eight 622 kg (1,373 lb).
Jet Fox GT
Powered by a 73.5 kW (98.6 hp) Rotax 912 ULS.
Airo 1
Sold by Airo Aviation (United Arab Emirates). Some small specification changes, e.g. span reduced by 335 mm (13 in), fuel capacity increased.
Airo 1F
Floatplane version of Airo 1.

== Specifications (Jet Fox 97, Rotax 912) ==
Data from Jane's All the World's Aircraft 2011-12

General characteristics

- Capacity: 2
- Length: 5.78 m (19 ft 0 in)
- Wingspan: 9.78 m (32 ft 1 in)
- Height: 2.8 m (9 ft 2 in)
- Wing area: 14.62 m^{2} (157.4 sq ft)
- Empty weight: 278 kg (613 lb) including parachute
- Max takeoff weight: 450 kg (992 lb)
- Fuel capacity: 59 L (13 Imp gal, 15.6 US gal)
- Powerplant: 1 × Rotax 912 UL 4-cylinder horizontally opposed piston engine, air- and water-cooled, 60 kW (80 hp)
- Propellers: T wooden

Performance

- Maximum speed: 175 km/h (109 mph, 94 kn)
- Cruise speed: 150 km/h (93 mph, 81 kn)
- Stall speed: 60 km/h (37 mph, 32 kn)
- Range: 320 km (200 mi, 170 nmi)
- Endurance: 4 h 30 min
- g limits: +6/-3.5
- Rate of climb: 6.0 m/s (1,180 ft/min)
