= Ras Al Khaimah Free Trade Zone =

Ras Al Khaimah Free Trade Zone (RAK FTZ)
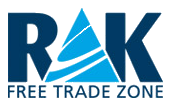
- Founded: 2000
- Headquarters: Ras Al Khaimah, United Arab Emirates
- Area served: Global
- Key people: His Highness Sheikh Ahmed bin Saqr Al Qasimi, Mohammadreza vazirian Chairman ASR Farasazan Pars, Group CEO
- Products: Business Licences, Offices, Warehouses and Land for Development
- Website: rakftz.com

Ras Al Khaimah Free Trade Zone (RAK FTZ) is a special economic zone in Ras Al Khaimah. RAK FTZ is around an hour drive from Dubai.

== Overview ==
The free zone provides a tax-free environment, 100% foreign ownership, fast-track visas, freedom to source labour and materials globally, and ongoing business support services. RAK FTZ provides these incentives at lower cost than free zones in other emirates.

RAK FTZ was established in May 2000 by an Emiri Decree. His Highness Sheikh Ahmed bin Saqr Al Qasimi is its chairman.

RAK FTZ has four free zone parks in Ras Al Khaimah – a Business Park for office clients, an Industrial Park for heavy manufacturing, a Technology Park for trading and light manufacturing, and an Academic Zone for educational institutions. It has also representative offices in Turkey, India, and Germany.

RAK FTZ organizes the Business Excellence Awards, and ABIYA was awarded the fastest growing company in 2015.

It has investments from more than 12,000 companies in over a hundred countries, representing more than 50 industry sectors.

== RAK FTZ Parks ==
Business Park

The RAK FTZ Business Park consists of five buildings – Business Centers 1 to 4, and the Administration Building. The Business Park is situated in the heart of Ras Al Khaimah's business district.

Industrial Park

The Industrial Park is located along the Ras Al Khaimah coastal road, approximately 18 km north of Ras Al Khaimah's city center, and adjacent to Hulaylah Island. The park is about 6 km from Ras Al Khaimah's Saqr Port, covering an area of 128 hectares. It is developed for heavy industries and warehousing, and also incorporates energy supply. The park's facilities include on-site employee accommodations, a customs office, an operation supportive services center, as well as other administrative support and service centers.

Technology Park

Located south of Ras Al Khaimah's city center, the Technology Park is in close proximity to Dubai via Sheikh Mohammed bin Zayed Road (E311) and Ras Al Khaimah International Airport. Covering an area of 100 hectares, it is located opposite from Al Hamra Village and Resort.

Academic Zone

The Academic Zone comprises educational organizations that offer academic programs to the RAK and broader UAE communities. The main cluster of campuses is in Academic Zone 3, which is located in the Al Dhait area. Some educational organisations established under the free zone operate from separate campuses at assigned locations in Ras Al Khaimah.

== RAK FTZ International Offices ==
India

The RAK FTZ India Office in Mumbai officially began its activities in August 2005, making RAK FTZ the first UAE free zone to have a liaison office in India. Many of RAK FTZ's clients come from India.

Turkey

RAK FTZ's Turkey liaison Office was established in December 2007. It is located in Atasehir, on the Asian side of Istanbul, and is easily accessible from any location in Istanbul. RAK FTZ is the only UAE free trade zone with a liaison office in Turkey.

Germany

RAK FTZ's Germany liaison office was established in April 2008 in response to significant interest in the free zone from the German market. It is located at the MediaPark in Cologne. The office in Germany is the base for RAK FTZ's activities in central Europe.

== RAK FTZ UAE Business and Promotion Centers ==
The Ras Al Khaimah Free Trade Zone Authority also has promotion centers in Dubai and Abu Dhabi.

Dubai

The RAK FTZ Promotion Centre in Dubai is located in the Boulevard Plaza Tower 2 on Sheikh Zayed Road.

Abu Dhabi

RAK FTZ also has a promotion center at Abu Dhabi Mall (Abu Dhabi). The office is located on the first floor of the West Tower.

== See also ==
- Ras Al Khaimah
