= Al Qurm =

Qurm
- Location within United Arab Emirates
- Coordinates: 25°54′41″N 56°3′51″E
- Country: United Arab Emirates
- Emirate: Ras al-Khaimah
- Elevation: 187 m (614 ft)

Al Qurm is a suburb of the city of Ras Al Khaimah in the United Arab Emirates (UAE). It is the location of the 250-room Radisson Blu Hotel Al Qurm.

== See also ==
- Qurum
