= Kush (Ras Al Khaimah) =

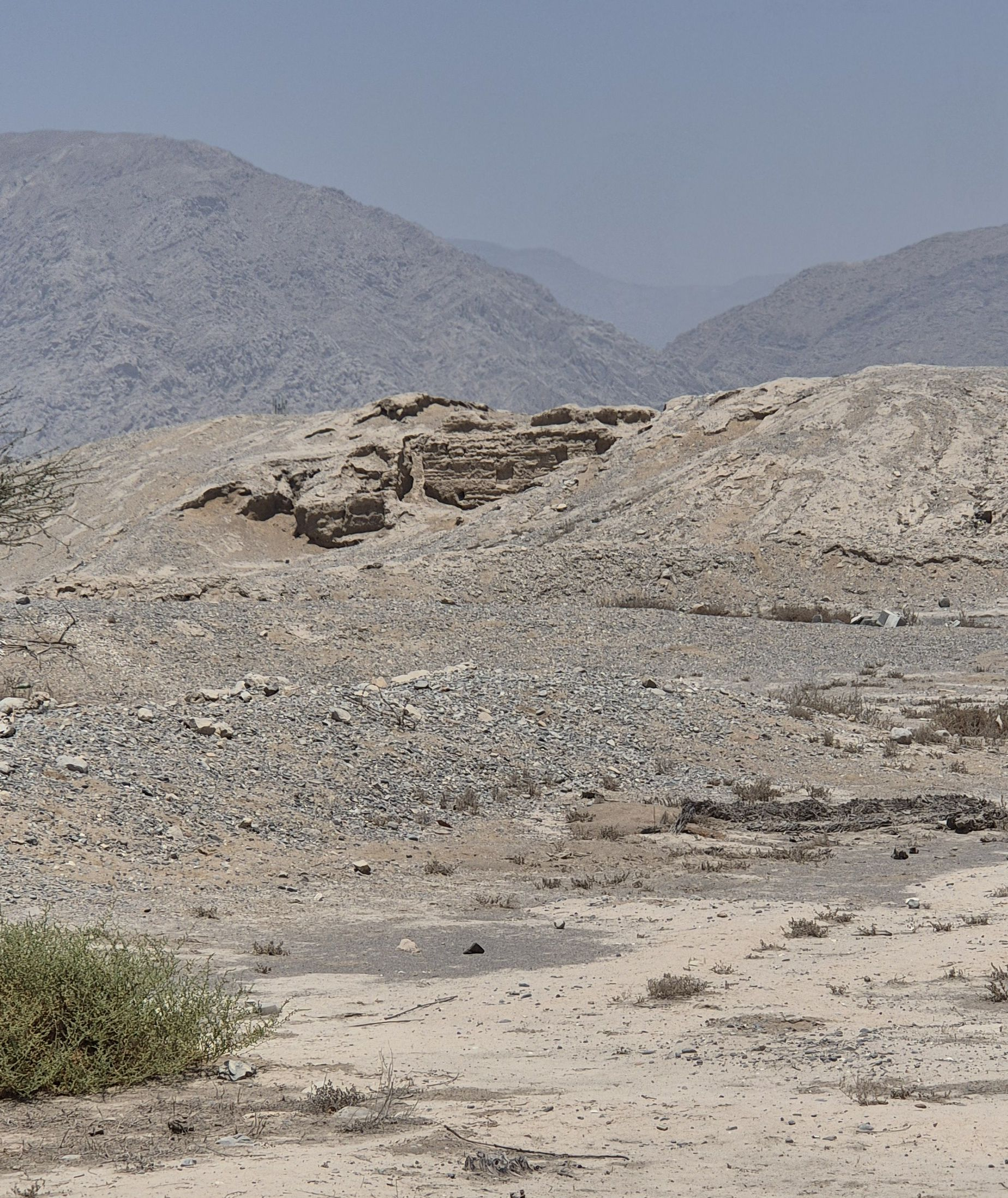
Kush today

Kush (Arabic: كوش) is a former settlement in Ras Al Khaimah, United Arab Emirates, a precursor settlement to the important Islamic era port town of Julfar. It stands, alongside Tell Abraq, as one of the largest archaeological tells in the Emirates.

== Establishment ==
Kush is thought to have been established in the 5th century CE, the Sasanian era, and to have been an important port in its time. It remained settled until the 13th century, when it appears to have been abandoned in favour of the growing settlement at Julfar. Although it was a settlement established in the Sasanian era, there is no evidence that it was in any sense a 'Sasanian settlement', and in fact appears to have been a rare example of continuity through a period of marked decline in southeastern Arabia.

The site of Kush has been excavated by a number of teams since its discovery during a survey carried out by Beatrice de Cardi in 1977. It was the largest archaeological tell in the Emirates, measuring some 120m x 100m and rising some 6.5 metres from the surrounding plain. It has been divided into two archaeological periods: period I consists of mud-brick construction dated to the 5th and 6th centuries that was thought to be military in purpose (with extensive finds of arrowheads), surrounded by a site of approximately one hectare comprising pottery sherds, post-holes, fire-pits, hearths and drains. Period II is built around a 14 x 7 metre rectangular tower made of mud brick, with 2 metre-thick walls pointing again to a defensive structure or fortification. The tower was abandoned in the late 8th century.

== Port and trade ==
Kush lies some 2.5 km from the present shore north of Ras Al Khaimah near Shimal. It would originally have had access to the sea through a lagoon which has since silted up and become a salt flat, or sabkha. With access to both the agricultural resources inland of Shimal and to the sea, the community settled at Kush was in a unique position to benefit from both resources. Kush itself appears in the archaeological record in the period immediately following the abandonment of the important sites of Mleiha and Ed Dur and a period of attrition in the region in general — only Kush and Khatt show evidence of occupation in the C5th west coast of southeastern Arabia and evidence for occupation elsewhere in the Sasanian era is scant.

Kush was part of an extensive trade network and pottery finds made there attest to trade with South Asia, Iran and Iraq. During a period where abandonment of settlements is common in the area, it is Kush that demonstrates a continuity of occupation through the late pre-Islamic into the Islamic era - and in fact there is evidence at Kush of trade with China in the 12th-14th Century and earlier - there have been finds of Chinese ceramics dating back to the 9th Century, the earliest finds of such ceramics in the area. These finds point to Kush and its successor settlement at Julfar being an important locus on the Umayyad and Abbasid trade route through the Gulf to India and the Far East. Kush is a standout location for the 11th to 13th centuries, as there is little other evidence of occupation in the area at this time beyond the Shimal Fort, or 'Sheba's Palace', itself relatively close by to Kush.

As Kush itself was abandoned, together with Sohar it appears to have declined in the period between 1000 and 1200, Julfar rose and there is ample evidence of links between Julfar and the emerging economy of Jarun/Hormuz. This, in turn, appears to have resulted in a considerable economic boom and a resurgence of settlement across the whole coast and interior. Julfar was itself abandoned in the late 16th century as the town of Ras Al Khaimah itself emerged as the primary trading entrepot of the Northern coast.
