= Wadi Al Helo (heritage site) =

- وادي الحلو (Arabic)
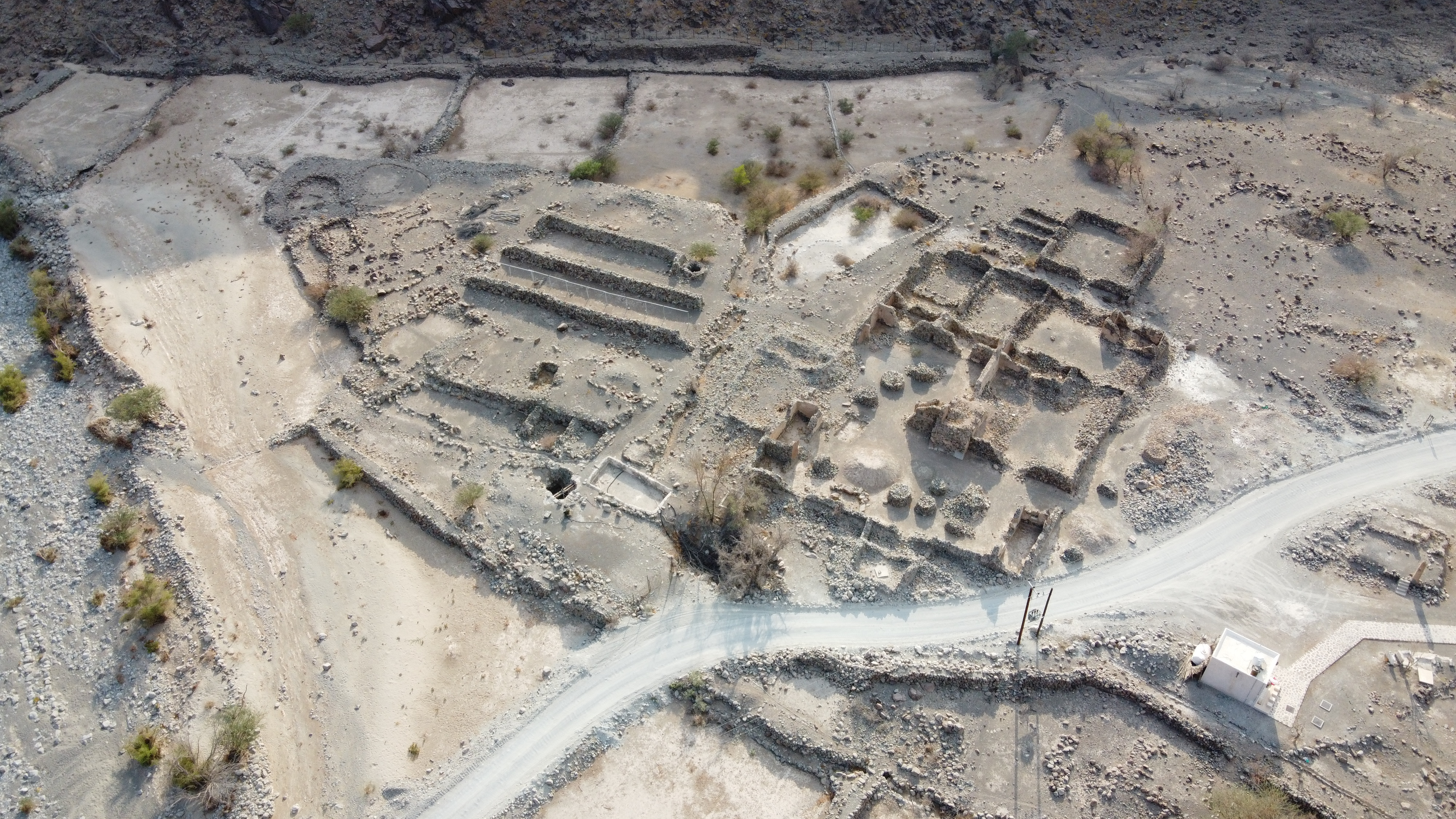
- Farmhouses at Wadi Al Helo.

- Location within United Arab Emirates
- 24°56′33″N 56°12′20″E
- Location: Wadi Al Helo, Sharjah, UAE
- Part of: South East Arabia

Site notes
- Area: Wadi Al Helo (wadi)
- Excavation dates: 2007, 2008, 2009, 2011, 2012, 2016

Wadi Al Helo (Arabic: وادي الحلو, romanized: Wādī al-Ḥulw, literally "the Sweet Valley") is an archaeological landscape in the Emirate of Sharjah, United Arab Emirates. It is located in the Hajar Mountains, north of the modern settlement of Wadi Al Helo, within a mountain valley characterized by an ancient wadi terrace. The site is part of the wider Wadi Al Helo landscape, which extends beyond the principal excavated area designated "HLO1" and includes copper-bearing geological formations, archaeological features, rock art, agricultural areas and routes through the surrounding mountains. The wadi has abundant fresh water and vegetation, naturally occurring copper ore and mountain ridges that provided a distinctive environmental setting for prehistoric and later activity.

The site has been investigated since 2007. Those archaeological investigations have documented occupation and activity from the Neolithic and early Holocene through the Bronze Age and Iron Age and into later historical periods. Evidence from the southern part of the site includes fireplaces and stone-built features dating to the eighth millennium BC, while later excavations have revealed remains associated with subsequent periods of occupation and reuse. During the Early Bronze Age, the site was used for copper production, with excavations at HLO1 revealing ore-processing areas, furnaces, slag deposits and a casting pit. These remains form part of a wider archaeological landscape in which mineral resources, activity areas and routes through the Hajar Mountains were interconnected, although the extent to which all stages of copper production occurred across the wider wadi remains under investigation.

In 2023, Wadi Al Helo was added to the United Arab Emirates' UNESCO World Heritage Tentative List under the title "Wadi Al Helo: Testimony of Bronze Age Copper Production".

== Location and geography ==
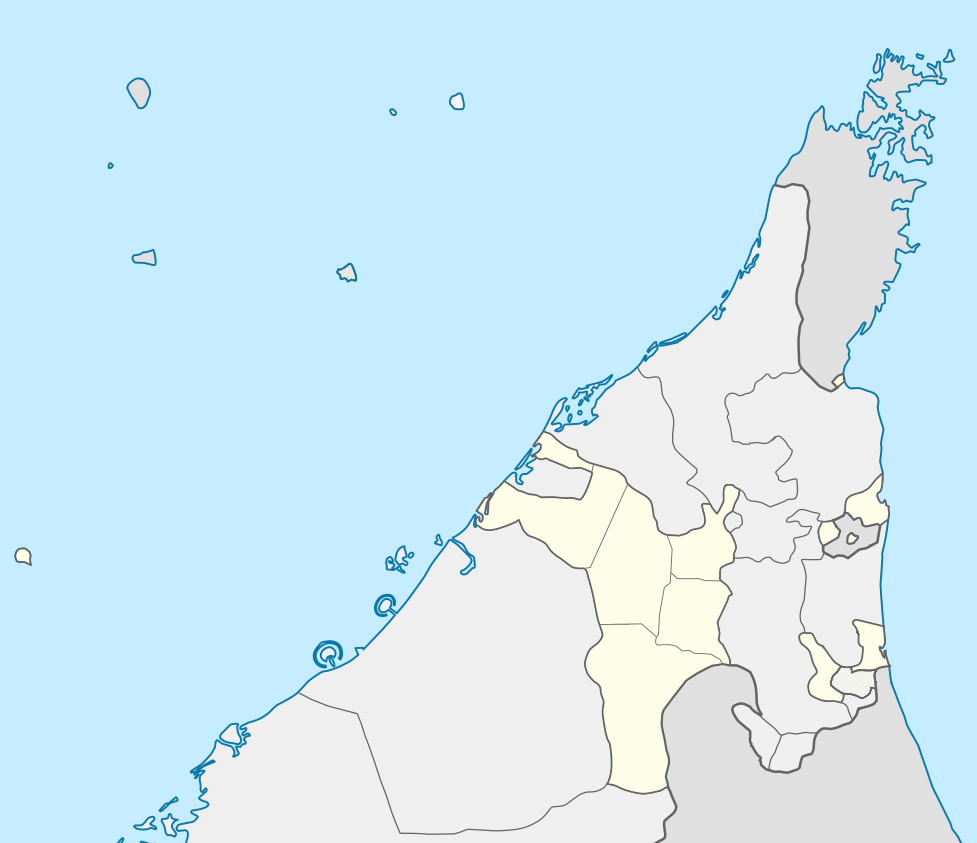
Location of the site within the Emirate of Sharjah.

View of Wadi Al Helo, showing the site and surrounding landscape.

Wadi Al Helo is a mountainous valley in the Hajar Mountains of the eastern part of the Emirate of Sharjah, United Arab Emirates. The valley extends over an estimated 84 km^{2} (32 sq mi) and follows a predominantly north–south course through the mountains before turning east towards the Gulf of Oman. Under present climatic conditions, the wadi bed is dry for most of the year but can carry substantial runoff during the rainy season. The valley contains several archaeological sites and historical remains. Its combination of fresh water, vegetation, mountain protection and accessible copper-bearing geological formations has been identified as an important factor in the long-term human use of the area.

The excavated site is located approximately 6 km north of the modern township of Wadi Al Helo, at an elevation of about 350 m above sea level on an old wadi terrace. The site lies approximately 15 km from the east coast, although the distance doubles when measured along the winding course of Wadi Al Helo, which flows south before turning east towards the Gulf of Oman. Major mountain ridges separate the site from the coast.

=== Geology, environment and cultural landscape ===
The surrounding mountains form part of the Omani–Emirati Ophiolite Complex, a geological formation that extends across northern Oman and the eastern United Arab Emirates. The bedrock around the site includes several ophiolitic units, including gabbros, and the surrounding area contains small occurrences of copper ore. Some of these ore exposures show evidence of ancient extraction and may have provided sources of raw material for copper production at the site.

Copper-bearing formations occur within the wider mountainous setting, and the archaeological evidence indicates that ore procurement and processing were linked to the geological resources of the area. The presence of water, vegetation and cultivable areas also distinguishes Wadi Al Helo from a purely extractive production locality. These environmental characteristics formed part of the setting in which the wadi was used across different periods, although the relationship between particular environmental conditions and individual episodes of occupation cannot always be established directly from the archaeological record. The UNESCO Tentative List likewise emphasizes the relationship between the copper-production remains and the valley's geological and ecological setting, including its copper-bearing formations, fresh water, vegetation and mountainous topography.

The upper Wadi Al Helo came under the responsibility of the Sharjah Archaeology Authority following an exchange of territories between the emirates of Fujairah and Sharjah. This change in territorial administration brought the site within Sharjah's archaeological jurisdiction and preceded the archaeological investigations of the site.

The combination of water, vegetation and copper-bearing geological formations contributed to the long-term human use of Wadi Al Helo. Its archaeological record reflects changing forms of activity, including early Holocene occupation, Bronze Age copper production, later reuse of structures, burial and agricultural activity. These features indicate that human use of Wadi Al Helo was shaped by the interaction between natural resources and the wider mountainous environment.

== Archaeological history ==
The archaeological area, particularly the designated HLO1 by archaeologists, became the subject of investigation after surveys of its extensive slag deposits produced a fragment of pottery, suggesting that the remains were associated with Early Bronze Age copper production. A low mound near the historic watchtower also attracted attention because it was initially thought to contain a Bronze Age grave. The first excavation season took place in 2007 as part of a joint project between the Sharjah Archaeology Authority and the Institute of Pre- and Protohistory of the University of Tübingen. Excavations continued in 2008, 2009, 2011 and 2012, initially focusing on the Bronze Age copper-production remains and associated structures. Further excavations were undertaken in 2015–2016, when the focus shifted towards the southern part of HLO1 following the discovery of Neolithic evidence in the earlier campaigns. These investigations revealed that human activity at the site began much earlier than initially expected, extending into the Early Holocene.

HLO1 represents the principal excavated area within the wider Wadi Al Helo archaeological landscape. The distinction is important because the UNESCO Tentative List property encompasses a broader area containing archaeological and environmental features associated with the valley. Evidence from HLO1 provides detailed information about copper production and the reuse of particular structures, while other parts of Wadi Al Helo contribute evidence for mining, rock art, routes, settlement and the historical use of the landscape. The archaeological significance of Wadi Al Helo consequently lies in the relationship between these different components, rather than in the HLO1 excavation area alone.

The following timeline presents the principal chronological phases relevant to the archaeological landscape; dates are approximate and do not necessarily indicate continuous occupation.

=== Early Holocene and Neolithic occupation ===
The earliest evidence at HLO1 consists mainly of fireplaces and stone-built features preserved beneath later deposits. Radiocarbon dating of fireplaces in the southern part of the site places some of this activity in the eighth millennium BC, while further Neolithic deposits were identified in the northern part. Radiocarbon dating of human remains associated with the Neolithic occupation produced a calibrated date of 6352–6231 BCE. The stone structures are difficult to interpret because of the limited associated artefacts, but some appear to have been constructed during the early Holocene. A later burial cut into one of the earlier structures provides evidence that parts of the site continued to be reused after the Neolithic. The same area was subsequently reused for burial during the Middle Bronze Age, with a grave dated to 1956–1892 BCE, indicating renewed funerary use more than four millennia after the Neolithic remains.

The earliest evidence at HLO1 consists mainly of fireplaces and stone-built features preserved beneath later deposits. Radiocarbon dating of fireplaces in the southern part of the site places some of this activity in the eighth millennium BC, while further Neolithic deposits were identified in the northern part. The 2015/16 excavations confirmed an early Holocene surface dating to around the eighth millennium BC and identified small structures built on this surface, although their function could not be established because of the absence of diagnostic artefacts. Radiocarbon dating of human remains associated with the Neolithic occupation produced a calibrated date of 6352–6231 BCE.

The Neolithic evidence suggests repeated use of the area rather than a substantial permanent settlement. The large fireplaces and stone structures indicate activity over a considerable span of the early Holocene, although the limited artefact assemblage makes it difficult to establish the precise nature of the occupation. The location of HLO1, with access to water and mountain resources, may have made the valley attractive to mobile groups using the Hajar Mountains during this period.

The early Holocene and Neolithic evidence should be distinguished from the later metallurgical activity at HLO1. The excavators interpreted HLO1-south as an Early Neolithic site associated with mobile herding groups. The Neolithic evidence is separated chronologically from the later Bronze Age copper-production remains in the archaeological record, although the available radiocarbon sequence contains gaps and does not establish the duration or nature of any intervening hiatus. This sequence indicates repeated use of the locality, but does not by itself demonstrate an uninterrupted settlement tradition between the Neolithic and Bronze Age phases.

=== Bronze Age ===
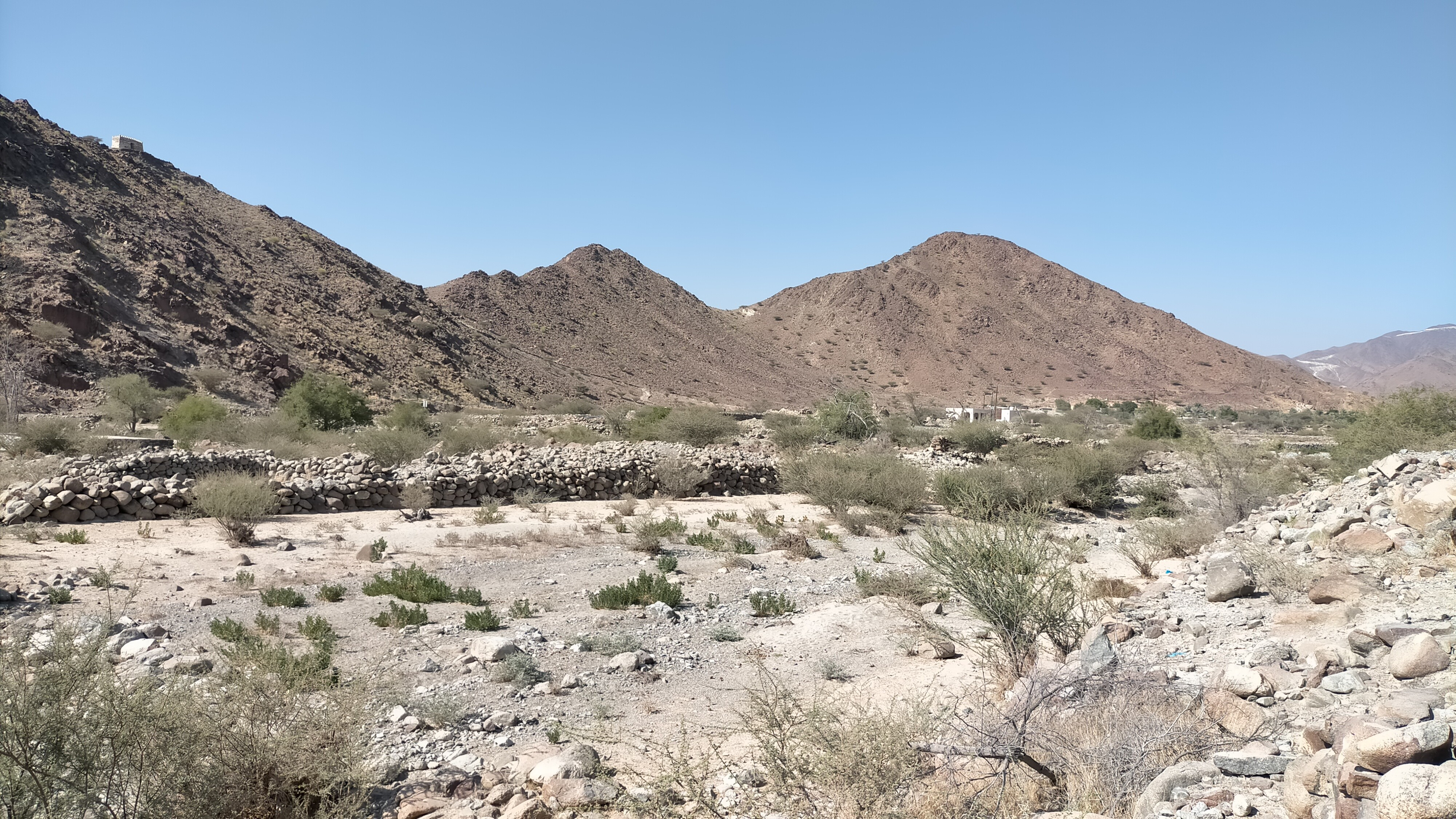
Wadi Al Helo archaeological site - Harrah.

The Early Bronze Age in southeastern Arabia is generally associated with the Hafit and Umm an-Nar periods. The Hafit period is dated approximately to 3200–2600/2800 BC, while the Umm an-Nar phase is generally dated to around 2800–2000 BC. The Wadi Suq period followed during the second millennium BC, approximately 2000–1600 BC. These periods witnessed changes in settlement, burial practices, material culture and copper production across southeastern Arabia. Wadi Al Helo forms part of this wider archaeological context, although evidence from HLO1 must be distinguished from comparative evidence obtained at other sites in the region.

At HLO1, evidence of copper production is associated with the Early Bronze Age, including the Hafit period. Archaeological investigations identified metallurgical remains and activity areas associated with the processing of copper ore. These include crushing stones, slag deposits and furnace-related features. The evidence indicates that HLO1 was used for copper production during the Bronze Age, while the chronology of individual installations and activity areas must be considered in relation to their archaeological contexts.

The evidence from HLO1 should be understood within the wider landscape of Wadi Al Helo. Copper-bearing geological formations and ancient extraction areas occur in the surrounding mountainous region, while production-related remains are concentrated in particular areas of the valley. The relationship between ore sources, processing areas, workshops and other structures provides a basis for interpreting Wadi Al Helo as a landscape in which geological resources, human activity and movement through the mountains were closely connected.

==== Copper production and the chaîne opératoire ====
Copper production at Wadi Al Helo can be understood through a chaîne opératoire extending from the procurement and preparation of copper ore to smelting and possible casting. The surrounding mountains contain copper-bearing minerals, including chrysocolla, chalcocite and malachite, within quartz veins associated with ophiolite formations. Evidence of ore extraction and exposed deposits indicates that access to these resources formed an important part of the wider production landscape, although the precise relationship between individual extraction areas and the production installations at HLO1 is not fully established.

The preparation of the ore involved breaking, crushing and sorting. Excavations at HLO1 have identified crushing stones, hammerstones and workshop deposits associated with ore processing, including greenish layers interpreted as evidence of copper-ore enrichment or sorting. Smelting is represented by furnace remains, slag deposits and other high-temperature metallurgical features. Flow slag and furnace-related evidence indicate that copper was extracted from the prepared ore at the site. A substantial accumulation of slag in the production area further indicates the scale of metallurgical activity at HLO1. Evidence for later stages of production includes a copper ingot weighing approximately 4.6 kg and a possible casting pit. Together with the ore-processing and smelting remains, these finds indicate that HLO1 was involved in several stages of copper production rather than simply serving as a place where copper objects were used or redistributed.

The archaeological evidence therefore preserves different stages of the chaîne opératoire unevenly, from ore procurement and preparation to smelting and possible casting. While the complete sequence cannot be reconstructed in every detail, the distribution of these remains demonstrates that copper production formed an important activity at HLO1.

==== Regional connections ====
Copper production at Wadi Al Helo formed part of the wider metallurgical and exchange networks of southeastern Arabia during the Bronze Age. Kalba, on the coast of the Gulf of Oman, provides an important regional comparison because of its maritime connections and inland routes through Wadi Ham towards the mineral-rich Hajar Mountains. Archaeological evidence from Kalba includes imported ceramics associated with Mesopotamia, the Indus region, southeastern Iran and Dilmun, demonstrating multidirectional exchange networks during the Early Bronze Age. However, these connections provide regional context rather than evidence for a direct export route between Wadi Al Helo and Kalba or any other particular settlement. These connections provide regional context for Wadi Al Helo, but do not by themselves demonstrate a direct exchange route between Wadi Al Helo and Kalba.

Comparative evidence from Al-Arid, Ibri in the southern foothills of the Hajar Mountains provides further evidence for the organization of copper production in southeastern Arabia. Excavations there identified a copper-production workshop containing ore fragments, copper prills, waste material, grinding stones and crucible fragments, associated with both Hafit and Umm an-Nar phases.

==== Later Bronze Age reuse ====
During the later Bronze Age, parts of Wadi Al Helo appear to have been reused or adapted for different purposes. The circular and oval structures identified at HLO1 are not interpreted as a single group of structures with uncertain functions; rather, individual structures have been assigned different interpretations on the basis of their construction, archaeological context and associated finds.

An oval structure containing slag has been interpreted as a possible workshop. By contrast, the circular structure located near the later historic watchtower was initially suspected to be a prehistoric grave, but excavation did not produce funerary evidence. Kutterer instead interpreted it as a possible small watchtower dating to the Umm an-Nar period, drawing comparisons with similar structures at Maysar in Oman. Other circular structures at Wadi Al Helo have been interpreted as Bronze Age graves or tombs. The 2015/16 excavation report provides additional evidence for this reuse of earlier remains, describing a Wadi Suq-period grave constructed into an earlier subterranean Neolithic grave/structure.

The different interpretations therefore concern different structures rather than the same structures being variously identified as graves, workshops or watchtowers. Together, the evidence indicates that copper production was embedded within a broader landscape of burial, settlement, defensive and other activities rather than confined to an isolated production area.

=== Iron Age ===
Evidence from the Iron Age is found mainly in pottery and the reuse of structures from earlier periods. The archaeological evidence from HLO1 also indicates that copper-related activity continued or recurred during the Iron Age, although the surviving remains are insufficient to establish its scale or organization in the same detail as the earlier Bronze Age production. The site appears to have remained in use into the Late Iron Age. The Iron Age evidence at Wadi Al Helo is therefore best considered separately from the better-documented Early Bronze Age copper-production phase. The evidence indicates continued use of the site and copper-related activity, but does not permit the complete production sequence or its scale to be reconstructed.

Copper production in southeastern Arabia continued and developed during the Iron Age, with evidence from sites in Oman and other parts of the region documenting copper-smelting industries between approximately 1300 and 800 BC. Comparative research indicates that these industries operated within regional and internal exchange networks, while the available evidence does not consistently demonstrate centralized political control over production. This regional context provides a basis for considering the Iron Age evidence from Wadi Al Helo, although the scale and organization of production at HLO1 require separate assessment from its archaeological remains. This regional evidence provides comparative context for Wadi Al Helo, but should not be taken to demonstrate that HLO1 followed the same production organization as the Iron Age industries documented elsewhere in southeastern Arabia.

=== Islamic period and later settlement ===
Historic watchtower at the entrance to HLO1, restored in 2008.

The area around HLO1 continued to be used during the Islamic and later historical periods for habitation, agriculture, and burial. Within the archaeological site, the remains of a rural settlement include semi-subterranean houses, larger above-ground buildings, and structures interpreted as stables and sheds. Together with more than one hundred Islamic graves, these remains indicate the presence of a historic settlement in the northern and central parts of the prehistoric copper-production area. The precise chronology and function of some structures remain uncertain.

One of the most distinctive later structures is a large building interpreted as a tobacco-drying shed. Its parallel walls and four stone-lined post-holes, identified during the 2012 excavations, indicate that the space was once covered by a wooden roof, probably made from date-palm leaves. The tobacco-drying area therefore forms part of the archaeological remains of the later settlement at Wadi Al Helo.

The wider setting of HLO1 also preserves evidence of agricultural and domestic activity. Gardens and fields enclosed by low stone walls were recorded on the lower ground west of the wadi, while small houses, an old mosque and the remains of a substantial historic building occur in the surrounding landscape. The latter, built of stone and mudbrick, was reportedly associated with a local notable and appears to have formed part of an important settlement area in the upper Wadi Al Helo. The restored watchtower at the entrance to HLO1 and defensive structures on the surrounding mountain ridges further illustrate the historical importance of the valley and its agricultural resources.

== Rock art and wider cultural landscape ==
The site forms part of a wider archaeological landscape in Wadi Al Helo that includes rock art and other evidence of human activity across the wadi and surrounding mountain landscape, as well as remains associated with copper production. Rock-art surveys conducted in Wadi Al Helo have included surface survey, photographic documentation and digital recording of engraved stone blocks as part of broader investigations of the rock-art landscape of Sharjah. That rock art represents multiple phases of activity, although the chronology of individual figures and panels remains under investigation. Petroglyphs have been recorded in and around the valley, including depictions of animals such as wild asses, ibex and oryxes. Similar rock art has been documented at sites elsewhere in the Sharjah region, including Khatmat Al-Mlaha and Wadi Shie. Among the recorded motifs are T-shaped figures, which have been interpreted as representations of daggers. These figures are characterized by a broad, curved or crescent-shaped upper element and a narrow central shaft, giving them a distinctive T-shaped appearance. The T-shaped figures occur alongside other engraved motifs, including circular forms, hand representations and animal figures. Their interpretation has been discussed in relation to the wider Bronze Age cultural landscape of Wadi Al Helo and the significance of copper production at the site. The rock art is therefore considered part of the wider archaeological landscape surrounding the copper-production area, although the chronology and precise meaning of individual motifs remain uncertain.

Some researchers have proposed that the rock art may preserve indications of routes connecting the interior of the peninsula with the east coast, including routes towards Khatmat Al-Mlaha and Dhaid. Regional rock-art research has also identified an east–west route through Wadi Al Helo linking the interior with the Gulf of Oman, placing the Wadi Al Helo rock-art landscape within a wider network of movement through the Hajar Mountains. The possible relationship between these routes, the movement of people and goods, and Bronze Age copper production at Wadi Al Helo remains a subject of research. The evidence for a direct connection between the petroglyphs and long-distance copper trade is not yet conclusive.

== Heritage status ==
Wadi Al Helo was added to the UNESCO World Heritage Tentative List on 1 February 2023 under the title "Wadi Al Helo: Testimony of Bronze Age Copper Production". The submission, made by the United Arab Emirates as a cultural property, proposes criteria (iii), (iv), and (v). It identifies the archaeological and environmental remains of the wadi as evidence of Bronze Age copper mining and smelting, and of the interaction between human communities, natural resources, and the mountainous landscape of southeastern Arabia.

The UNESCO submission proposes Outstanding Universal Value for Wadi Al Helo on the basis of its Bronze Age copper-production technology and its relationship with the geological and geographical setting of the Hajar Mountains. It identifies the property as evidence of a technological ensemble extending from copper-ore extraction and preparation through smelting and casting, and emphasizes the adaptation of these processes to the natural resources and geological conditions of the valley. The proposed value also encompasses the wider cultural landscape, including the rock-art routes through the mountains and the T-shaped figures associated in the submission with the significance of copper and the movement of people and products through the region.

As of 2026, the United Arab Emirates has 16 properties on its World Heritage Tentative List, six of which are located in the Emirate of Sharjah. The Sharjah entries comprise Wadi Al Helo, The Rock Art of the Emirate of Sharjah, Mleiha, Sharjah: the Gate to Trucial States, Sir Bu Nair Island, and the Coastal Fortified Network of South Eastern Arabia, which was added to the Tentative List in July 2026.

== See also ==
- Archaeological Sites of Bat, Al-Khutm and Al-Ayn
- List of ancient settlements in the UAE
- Neolithic in the Near East
- Iron Age in the United Arab Emirates
- Jebel Hafeet
- Wadi Ejili
- Muweilah

== Bibliography ==
- Alhouli, Khuloud; Khalil, Ossama (2025). "Wadi Al Helo: Testimony of Bronze Age Human Impacts on the Highlands". In Dardeniz, Gonca; Arıkan, Bülent (eds.). Resourcescape and Human Impact in Southwest Asia. Levantine Environmental and Material Archaeology. Vol. 6. Brepols. pp. 27–40.
- Angás, Jorge; Bea, Manuel; Jasim, Sabah Abboud; Uribe, Paula; Farjas, Mercedes (2021). "New insights into human occupation through rock art at Khatm al Melaha archaeological site (Sharjah, United Arab Emirates)". Journal of Archaeological Science: Reports. 39 (103147). doi:10.1016/j.jasrep.2021.103147.
- Castel, Corinne; Brochier, Jacques É.; Authier, Alexandre; Bertrand-Krajewski, Jean-Luc; Blond, Ninon; Chamel, Bérénice; Ciesielski, Elsa; Keuter, Inès; Kuronuma, Taichi; Marmara, Marylise; Mouamar, Georges; Ros, Anaïs; Sanz, Séverine; Sorin, Sabine; al-Ghafri, Waleed Awadh Harib (2025). "Al-Arid, an Early Bronze Age Site in the Southern Foothills of the Hajar Mountains (Sultanate of Oman): New Results from Two Further Seasons of Excavation in 2022 and 2023". Paléorient. 51: 169–188. doi:10.4000/14u0u.
- Eddisford, Daniel (2022). "Exchange networks of the Early Bronze Age Gulf: The imported ceramics from Kalba 4 (United Arab Emirates)". Arabian Archaeology and Epigraphy. 33: 23–48. doi:10.1111/aae.12208.
- El-Keblawy, Ali A.; Khedr, Abdel-Hamid A.; Khafaga, Tamer A. (2016). "Mountainous landscape vegetation and species composition at Wadi Al Helo: A protected area in Hajar mountains, UAE". Arid Land Research and Management. 30 (4): 389–399. doi:10.1080/15324982.2015.1136970.
- Kutterer, Johannes (2020). The Archaeological Site HLO1: A Bronze Age Copper Mining and Smelting Site in the Emirate of Sharjah (U.A.E.). Sharjah Archaeology Authority, Government of Sharjah. ISBN 978-9948-25-729-5.
- Kutterer, Johannes; Jasim, Sabah A. (2009). "First report on the copper-smelting site HLO-1 in Wādī al-Hilo, UAE". Proceedings of the Seminar for Arabian Studies. 39: 245–254.
- Fossati, Angelo (2022). "First Report on the Rock Art of Sharjah-UAE". Annual Sharjah Archaeology (20): 103–147.
- Lehner, Joseph W.; Dumitru, Ioana A.; Buffington, Abigail; Dollarhide, Eli; Nathan, Smiti; Paulsen, Paige; Young, Mary L.; Sivitskis, Alexander J.; Wiig, Frances; Harrower, Michael J. (2023). "Iron Age Copper Metallurgy in Southeast Arabia: A Comparative Perspective". ‘And in Length of Days Understanding’ (Job 12:12): Essays on Archaeology in the Eastern Mediterranean and Beyond in Honor of Thomas E. Levy. Cham: Springer. pp. 1391–1417. doi:10.1007/978-3-031-27330-8_59.
- Uerpmann, Margarethe; Uerpmann, Hans-Peter; Jasim, Sabah A. (2016). "Report on the 2015/16 Season of Excavations at the site HLO(1) in the Wadi al-Hilo (Emirate of Sharjah, UAE)". Annual Sharjah Archaeology (15): 116–122.
- Uerpmann, Margarethe; Uerpmann, Hans-Peter; Hinderer, Matthias; Lindauer, Susanne; Neureiter, Christina; Ghukasyan, Robert; Kesejyan, Suren; Petrosyan, Arthur (2018). "HLO1-south: An Early Neolithic site in Wadi al-Hilo (Sharjah, UAE)". Arabian Archaeology and Epigraphy. 29 (1): 1–9. doi:10.1111/aae.12107.

=== Further reading ===
- Burt, John A. (2024). A Natural History of the Emirates. Cham: Springer. doi:10.1007/978-3-031-37397-8.
- Jasim, Sabah Abboud (2023). دراسات في النقوش الصخرية في شبه الجزيرة العربية [Studies in Rock Art in the Arabian Peninsula] (in Arabic). Sharjah: Sharjah Archaeology Authority.
- Potts, Daniel T.; Al Naboodah, Hasan; and Hellyer, Peter (eds.) (2003). Archaeology of the United Arab Emirates: Proceedings of the First International Conference on the Archaeology of the U.A.E. London: Trident Press.
