= Neolithic in the United Arab Emirates =

Neolithic period in the United Arab Emirates

The Neolithic period in the United Arab Emirates is generally dated to c. 6600–3300 BCE and represents a major phase in the prehistory of south-eastern Arabia, during which communities developed increasingly structured forms of settlement, maritime subsistence, animal husbandry, funerary practice and long-distance exchange. Rather than forming a single uniform cultural horizon, the Neolithic in the UAE appears to have included a mosaic of coastal, island, lagoonal and inland communities with different degrees of mobility and sedentism.

The UAE coastline and offshore islands are now understood as part of a wider Arabian Gulf maritime world, with communities relying on fishing, shellfish gathering, pearling, marine mammal exploitation, stone and shell tools, plaster vessels, and exchange with communities across the Gulf, including Mesopotamia. Decorated Ubaid-period pottery recovered from sites in the UAE indicates long-distance contact across the Gulf during the Neolithic.

The end of the Neolithic is associated with the so-called 'Dark Millennium', a period of reduced archaeological visibility in parts of eastern Arabia during the fourth millennium BCE, linked to increasing aridity, falling lake levels and dune reactivation. This process was not a complete disappearance of human activity from the coast: the site of Akab continued to provide evidence for fishing, pearling and ritual practices associated with dugong exploitation into the late fourth millennium BCE. The re-emergence of more visible settlement and funerary evidence is associated with the Early Bronze Age Hafit period.

== Neolithic emergence ==
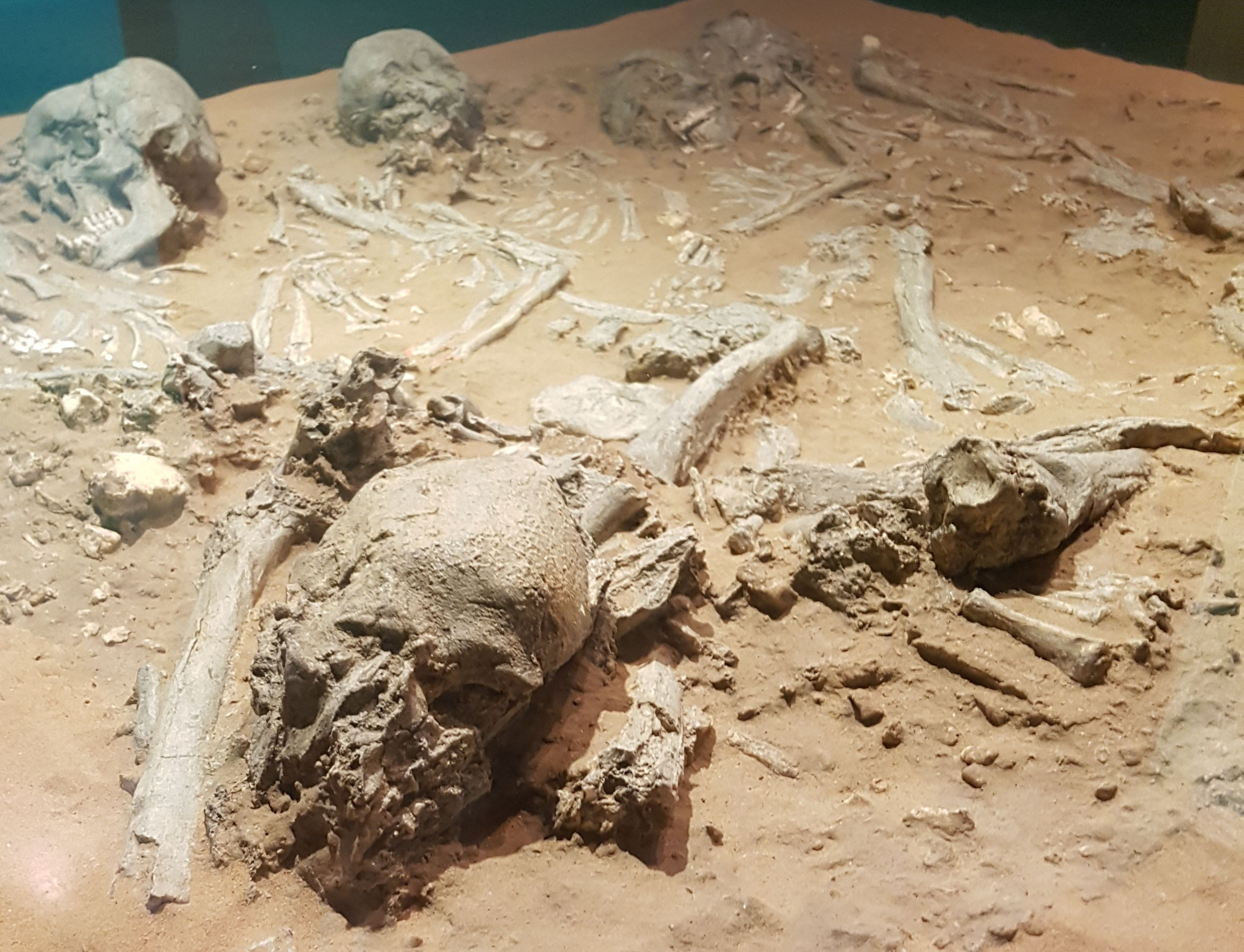
Neolithic burial from Buhais 18

Recent archaeological work by the Department of Culture and Tourism – Abu Dhabi (DCT) has significantly expanded knowledge of the Arabian Neolithic period in the UAE, particularly through excavations on the offshore islands of the Al Dhafra region of Abu Dhabi and along the northern UAE coastline.

The emergence of domestic architecture in the Early Neolithic is particularly well attested on the islands of Abu Dhabi Emirate. On Ghagha Island, excavations conducted between 2019 and 2024 by DCT Abu Dhabi have uncovered three successive Neolithic sites: GHG0014, GHG0063 and GHG0088. The site of GHG0014, radiocarbon dated to c. 6600–6500 cal. BCE, contains some of the earliest known stone-built structures in the Arabian Gulf region; trihedral tools are notably absent from the associated lithic assemblage. The site of GHG0088, dated to c. 6400–5400 cal. BCE, has yielded stone architecture, a human funerary deposit, marine shell tools, plaster vessels and a lithic industry consistent with a subsistence economy heavily reliant on marine resources. A hiatus in occupation attributed to aridification associated with the 8.2 kiloyear event separates the site's two main phases of use.

On neighbouring Marawah Island, the settlement and funerary complex of MR11, radiocarbon dated to c. 5800–5500 BCE, comprises domestic stone-built structures including a tripartite house, multi-roomed structures and a mortuary complex. Excavations of the mortuary complex have revealed several Neolithic interments, including a primary Neolithic burial dated to c. 5700 cal. BCE, with at least five individuals recovered from a single cell and smaller dedicated burial chambers flanking the larger domestic rooms. MR11 has also produced early evidence of pearling in the Arabian Gulf, as well as an early Ubaid pottery vessel recovered in situ in the region — a jar dated to c. 5550 BCE, indicative of long-distance exchange networks extending to Mesopotamia.

Delma Island, also in the Al Dhafra region, has yielded Neolithic and Ubaid-period remains including lithics, faunal assemblages and early evidence of date consumption, indicative of sustained maritime occupation from the late sixth millennium BCE.

Many other coastal sites are associated with Ubaid-period decorated Mesopotamian pottery, providing further evidence of long-distance contact networks with communities to the north. Despite the widespread presence of Ubaid pottery, there is no clear evidence for the emergence of a local ceramic industry in the UAE before the Early Bronze Age.

The inland necropolis at Jebel Buhais in Sharjah has burials attested from the fifth millennium BCE onwards. The graves have been interpreted in relation to mobile herding groups using inland landscapes seasonally. Many of the burials include grave goods such as flint tools, shell and coral ornaments, and beads of chert, agate, limestone and carnelian.

Along the northern UAE coastline, the French Archaeological Mission in the United Arab Emirates has excavated a series of Neolithic shell midden sites within the lagoon environment of Umm al-Quwain emirate. The site of UAQ2, occupied from the late sixth to the early fourth millennium BCE, represents one of the longest stratigraphic Neolithic sequences known in the Arabian Gulf, with evidence of diversified fishing economies, pastoral activity and burial practices.

The nearby site of Akab, located on a small islet within the Umm al-Quwain lagoon and dated to c. 4600–3500 BCE, is one of the most important Neolithic coastal sites in eastern Arabia. Excavations have revealed intensive fishing activity alongside specialised maritime hunting, with the site yielding one of the largest ichthyofaunal assemblages from the Arabian Neolithic: over 37,000 fish remains representing more than 50 species. Natural pearls and shell hooks manufactured from pearl oyster shell were also recovered, constituting early direct evidence of pearl fishing in the Arabian Gulf. The site is particularly noted for the discovery of a dugong bone mound — a structured platform of dugong skulls laid in parallel with ribs arranged in sets — dated to c. 3500–3300 BCE. This feature has been compared to analogous dugong bone platforms recorded ethnographically along the Torres Strait coast of Australia, and is thought to reflect the ritual significance of dugong hunting within the symbolic practices of Neolithic coastal communities of the Gulf. Although no direct regional parallel exists for the dugong mound, Neolithic burials incorporating turtle remains have been recorded in Oman at Ras al-Hamra.

These discoveries collectively establish the UAE coastline and its offshore islands as a zone of sustained early coastal settlement in the Arabian Gulf, with communities sustaining themselves through diversified marine resource exploitation including fishing, shellfishing and pearling, and contributing to ongoing revisions of Neolithisation models for the Arabian Peninsula.

== Lifestyles ==
Although the Neolithic is generally associated with stable settlement and husbandry, the Neolithic in the United Arab Emirates appears to have been characterised by a mix of settled, semi-settled and mobile lifeways. Coastal and island communities were often closely linked to marine environments, while inland groups probably practised combinations of herding, hunting and seasonal movement. Sheep, goats and cattle are attested in south-eastern Arabia during the Neolithic, although their role varied between coastal and inland contexts. Extensive consumption of fish and marine molluscs is documented at several coastal sites, while evidence from Akab and other sites shows the importance of fishing equipment, shell hooks, net weights and marine faunal assemblages.

The late Neolithic was also a period of regional exchange and technological specialisation. Tool production, shell-working, bead-making, soft-stone objects and Ubaid-period pottery all indicate participation in wider networks of contact across south-eastern Arabia and the Gulf. More sophisticated subsistence strategies included offshore fishing for species such as tuna and the use of specialised fishing equipment.

== End of the Neolithic ==
The archaeological record shows that the Arabian Neolithic progressively came to an end in eastern Arabia and the Oman peninsula during the fourth millennium BCE, after a phase of lake lowering and the onset of dune reactivation. This process affected areas west of the Hajar Mountains between c. 4000 and 3200 BCE — a period in the history of the Emirates known as the 'Dark Millennium'. A spring at Jebel Buhais dried up at this stage, an event broadly consistent with other evidence for increased aridity in the interior of Oman. Throughout southern Arabia, evidence of human inland settlement in the third millennium BCE is limited.

The Dark Millennium should not be understood as a complete abandonment of the coast. Akab Island continued to provide evidence for maritime activity into the late fourth millennium BCE, including the structured dugong bone mound and associated ritual practices. The subsequent re-emergence of more visible settlement and funerary evidence is associated with the Early Bronze Age and the beginning of the Hafit period.

== See also ==
- History of the United Arab Emirates
- Archaeology of the United Arab Emirates
- Dark Millennium (United Arab Emirates)
- Ubaid period
- Jebel Buhais
- Marawah Island
- Akab Island
