= Wadi Al Hijar =

Watercourse in Oman

Wadi Al Hijar or Wadi Al-Hijr is a wadi in Ad Dhahirah Region, in northeastern Oman. Its eastern branch flows past the ancient settlement of Bat.

In the late 1980s the wadi suffered from 'once- in-a-lifetime' floods in the upstream, with a devastating impact on irrigation, agriculture and settlements.
