= Akab Island =

Island in the United Arab Emirates

- Interactive map of Akab Island

Geography
- Location: Umm Al Quwain, United Arab Emirates
- Coordinates: 25°32′45″N 55°35′00″E
- Highest elevation: 5 m (16 ft)

Akab Island (Arabic: جزيرة الاكعاب, romanized: jazīrat-al-aki‘āb, "Heels Island") is an island in Umm Al Quwain, an emirate of the United Arab Emirates. It is one of seven islands located in the emirate, and people visit it to engage in a variety of activities such as birdwatching, camping, diving, snorkeling and other recreational ventures.

== About the island ==
Literally translating to, "Heels Island", Akab Island (جزيرة الاكعاب) is an island located in the capital and largest city of the small emirate of Umm Al Quwain, one of the seven emirates that make up the UAE. It sits near the localities Zawr (زور) and Minţaqat al ‘Ahd (منطقة العهد). The island, like the others in this emirate, is separated by a series of creeks. People visit Umm Al Quwain and its islands to engage in recreational and nature-filled activities, and as one of its seven islands, Jazīrat Al Aki‘āb is a popular spot for fishing, picnics and camping. It is surrounded by mangroves and is home to a variety of bird species, making it a popular spot for birdwatching. The water around the island is also a popular destination for diving and snorkeling, and is teeming with marine life.

=== Neolithic site ===
The site of Akab Island provides unique insights into what are thought to have been Neolithic ritualistic practises, with a unique dugong bone mound discovered there, which not only has no direct parallel in the region but also stands as a rare (possibly unique) find dated to the 'Dark Millennium'. The mound consists of structurally aligned dugong bones littered with jewellery and other artefacts and has been dated to between 3,500-3,200 BCE. Although there is no direct parallel to the dugong mound, Neolithic burials with turtle remains have been noted in Oman at Ras Al Hamra (dated to 3700-3300 BCE). However, dugong bone mounds have been found in totemic sites in Australia on the coast of the Torres Strait: these, however, date to between the 14th and 20th Centuries.

The wider site at Akab shows occupation throughout the fifth millennium, from 4,750-3,814 BCE, while signs of occupation in the fourth millennium, apart from the bone mound, are scant. Both net weights and hooks made from mother-of-pearl were found at the site, as well as evidence of settlement and bones from a wide range of coastal fish species.
