= Jebel Buhais =

Archaeological site in the United Arab Emirates

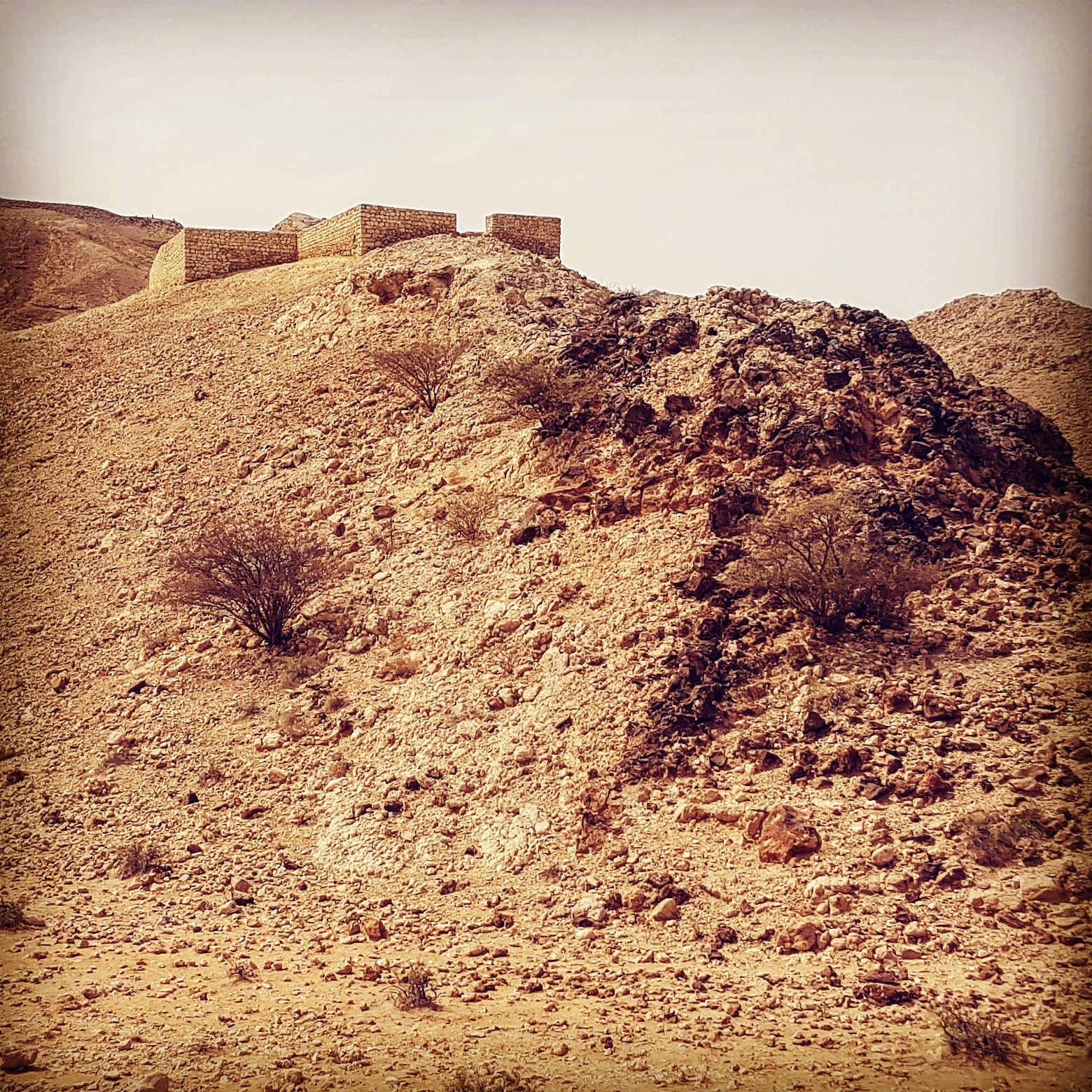
- The Iron Age fort at the core of the necropolis of Jebel Buhais, first discovered in 1973 by Iraqi archaeologists

Highest point
- Elevation: 340 m (1,120 ft)
- Prominence: 135 m (443 ft)
- Isolation: 7.8 km (4.8 mi)
- Coordinates: 25°1′1″N 55°47′41″E

Naming
- Native name: جَبَل بُحَيْص (Arabic); جَبَل ٱلْبُحَيْص (Arabic)

Geography
- Location within United Arab Emirates Location within Middle East Location within Asia
- Location: Sharjah, the U.A.E.
- Parent range: Al Hajar Mountains

Jebel Buhais or Jebel Al-Buhais (Arabic: جَبَل بُحَيْص \ جَبَل ٱلْبُحَيْص, romanized: Jabal Buḥayṣ / Jabal Al-Buḥayṣ) is a geological feature, an extensive rocky outcrop, as well as an archaeological site located near Madam in the central region of the Emirate of Sharjah, the UAE, about 48 kilometres (30 miles) southeast of the city of Sharjah. The area contains an extensive necropolis, consisting of burial sites spanning the Neolithic, Bronze, Iron and Hellenistic ages of human settlement in the UAE. Burials at Jebel Buhais (Jebel is Arabic for mountain) date back to the 5th Millennium BCE. The site is located to the side of a limestone outcrop rising to some 340 metres (1,120 feet) above sea level and which runs almost contiguously from the town of Madam north to the town of Mleiha, itself an important archaeological site.

Jebel Buhais is the oldest radiometrically dated inland burial site in the UAE. The area is protected, having been defined as a nature reserve.

== History and prehistory ==
=== Discovery ===
The site was first appreciated as being of potential significance by archaeologists from Iraq in 1973, but extensive excavations did not take place until the late 1980s, with digs undertaken by the French mission to the Emirate of Sharjah and from the Autonomous University of Madrid through to the early 1990s. Following this early work, researchers from the Sharjah government's Directorate of Antiquities discovered a camel entombed in a grave site, BHS 12, which led to a team from the University of Tübingen carrying out digs from 1995 onwards. The discovery and excavation of BHS 12 led to the discovery of the important BHS 18 site, which saw 10 digs from 1996-2005 uncovering a burial site which was to become 'one of the key neolithic sites in Southern Arabia'. The complete remains of some 600 individuals have been found at the site, with many thought yet to be found. Of the many tombs and sites at Jebel Buhais, the clover-shaped Wadi Suq period tomb BHS 66 stands as a unique piece of funerary architecture in the UAE.

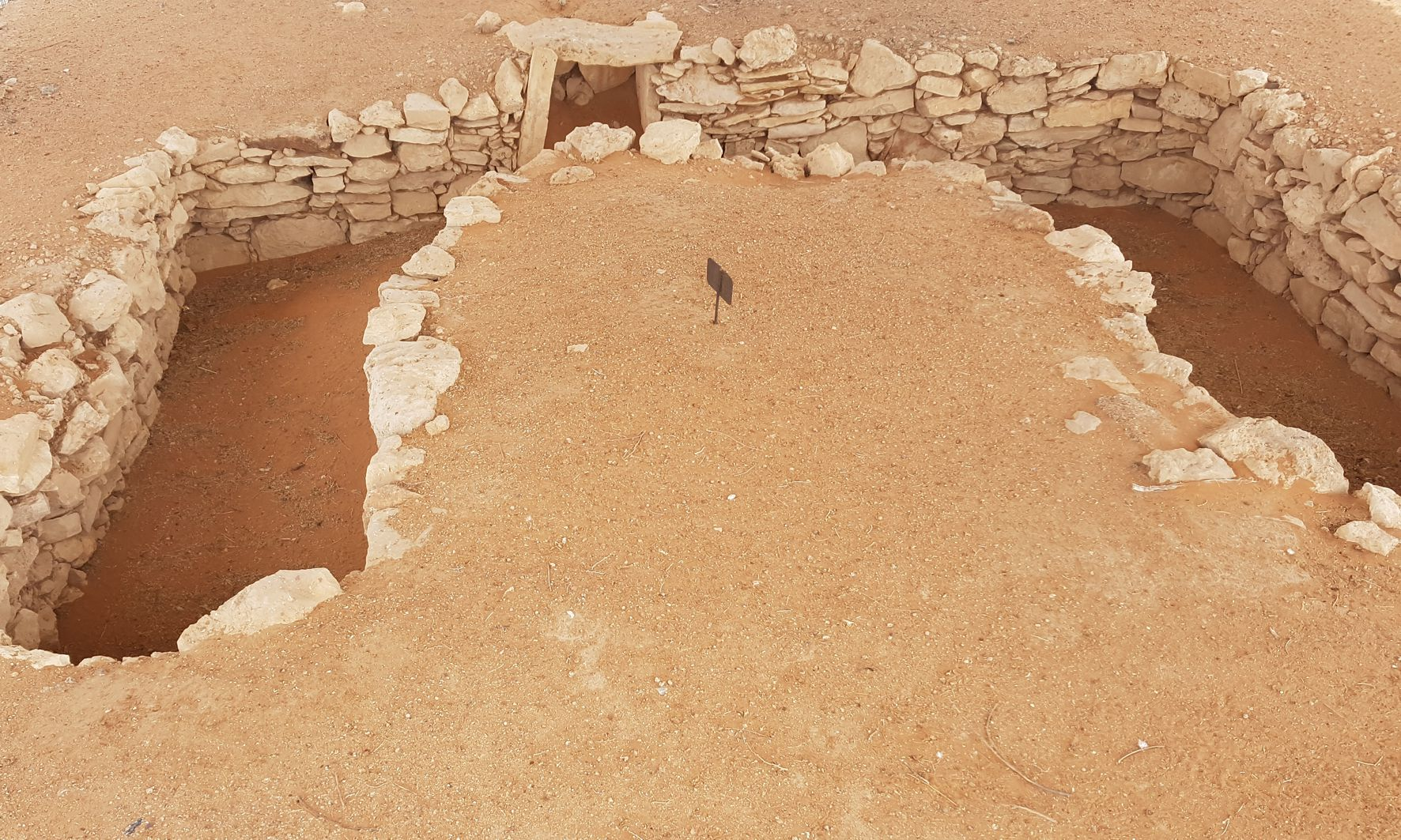
One of many tombs scattered across the archaeological site

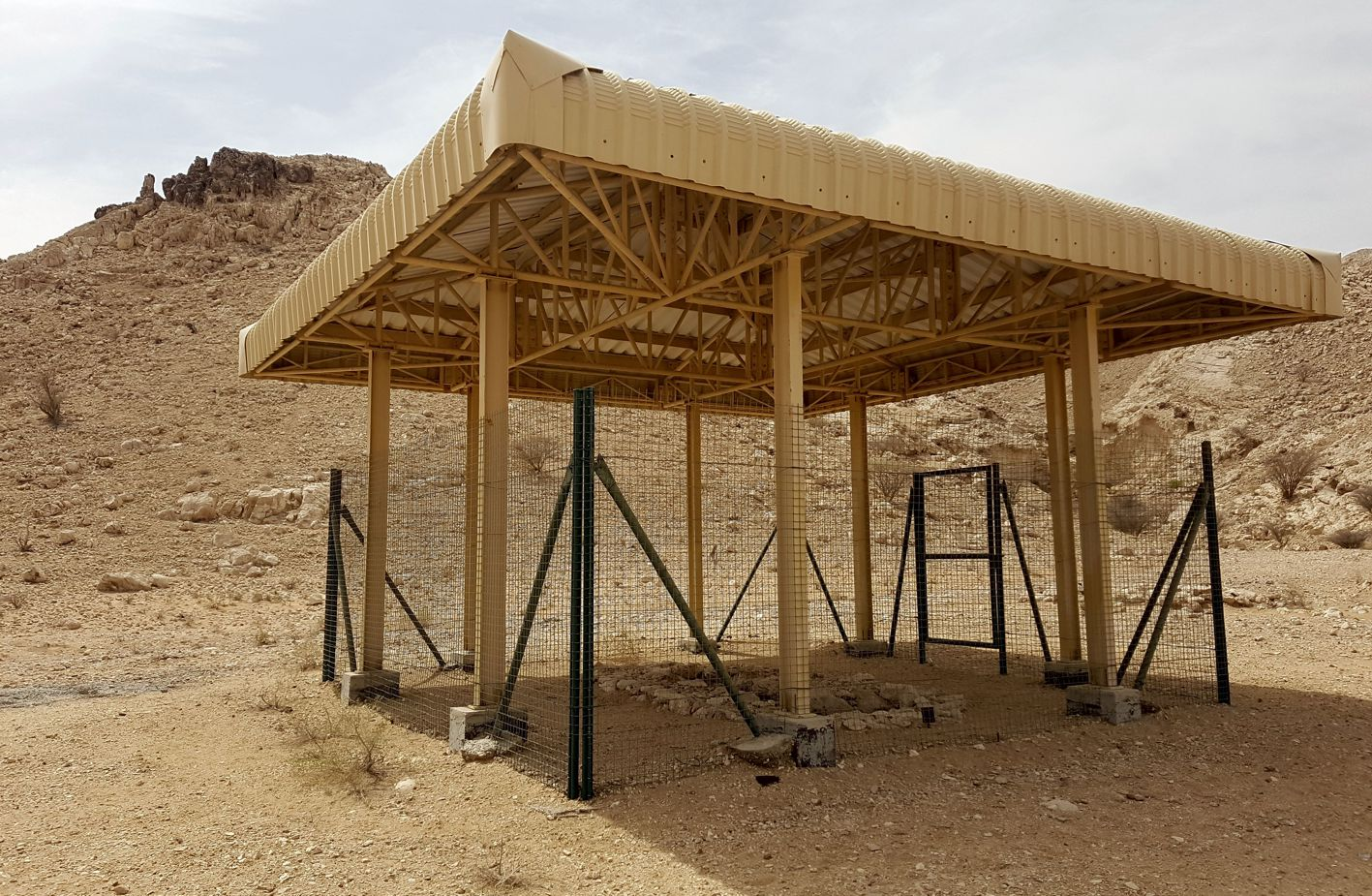
Many of the tombs found by archaeologists at Jebel Al-Buhais are now covered and fenced

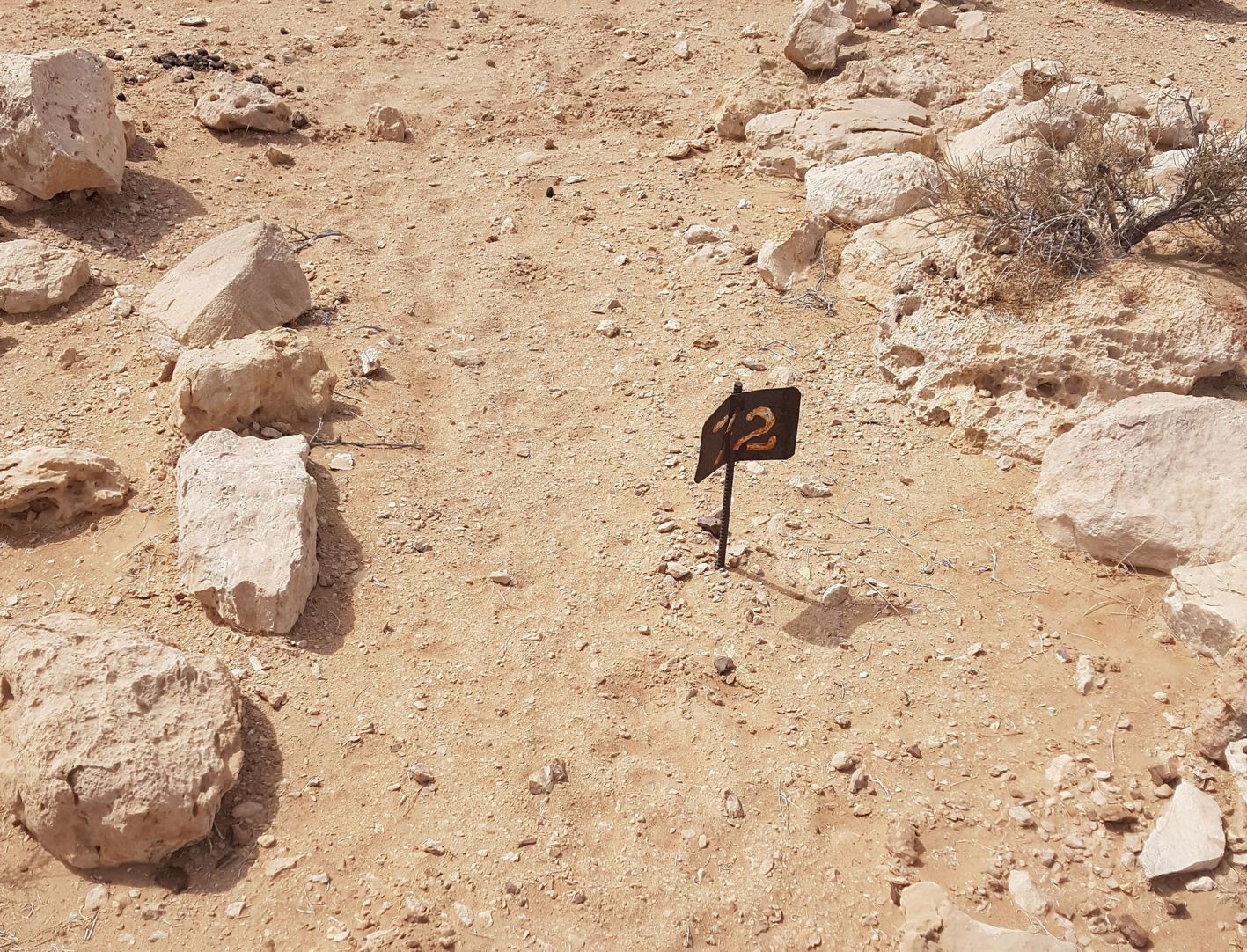
Burial BHS 72 at Jebel Al-Buhais - many of the minor finds are unprotected and their identifying plaques have worn and are often hard if not impossible to read. Access to the area is difficult as there are no well defined roadways or tracks.

=== Stone Age and Dark Millennium ===
Dated to the late Stone Age, Neolithic finds at BHS 18 have been carbon-dated spanning some 1,000 years from 5,000 to 4,000 BCE, with burials at the site thought to be those of nomadic herders who travelled inland for the winter season. Jebel Buhais is unique as an inland neolithic site in the UAE, all other sites discovered to date have been coastal, and the site has yielded no evidence of burials in the following millennium. This is thought to be consistent with changing patterns of human life as a result of climate change: a spring discovered at Jebel Buhais dried up at this stage, an event contemporaneous with similar discoveries pointing to increased aridity in the interior of Oman. Throughout Southern Arabia, evidence of human inland settlement in the 4th millennium BCE is scant, leading to the phrase 'Dark Millennium', used to define and characterise the period from 4,000 to 3,200 BCE when the west coast and western interior were abandoned.

=== Post-Neolithic era ===
Subsequent burials at Jebel Buhais represent the early Bronze Age Hafit period (3200 - 2600 BCE), with many distinctive 'beehive' Hafit graves discovered. None, however, were found with human remains of that era. The subsequent era of human occupation, Umm Al Nar (2600-2000 BCE) is not represented at Jebel Buhais although there were Umm Al Nar period burials in nearby Mleiha.

Wadi Suq graves at Jebel Buhais include those found at BHS 8. A number of later burials, including some invasive later burials in older grave sites, are also evident at the site. Iron Age burials, particularly the group of graves defined as BHS 85, are thought to be linked to the nearby Iron Age settlement site of Al Thuqeibah.

An Iron Age fort at Buhais, thought to date to the first millennium BCE (Iron Age II), was originally excavated by a team from Iraq in the 1970s.

Late Iron Age weaponry found at Buhais (as well as Qattara and Rumailah) supports the theory that the area, once known to the Sumerians as Magan, was known to the Achaemenids as the satrapy of Maka. Evidenced both in inscriptions and texts from Persepolis, Maka supplied troops to Xerxes to fight in his army in 480 BCE according to Herodotus' Histories. Iron Age short swords with distinctive crescent pommels of a type found in Qattara are identical in form to that borne by the figure of a native of Maka carved in Darius II’s grave relief at Persepolis.

== Geological park ==
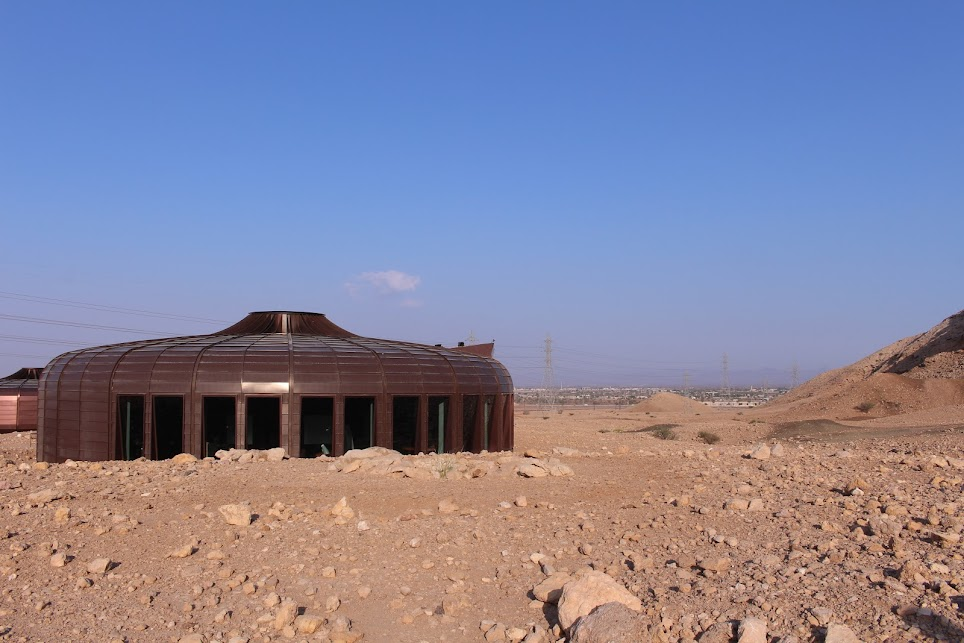
Buhais Geological Park

On Monday the 21st of January, 2020, Sheikh Sultan bin Muhammad Al-Qasimi, Ruler of Sharjah, inaugurated the Buhais Geology Park. The park is meant to showcase to visitors the archaeological importance of Jebel Buhais and surrounding areas in the Emirate, using the fossils and geological features contained there, which date back at least 93 million years to the Cretaceous era.

== See also ==
- List of Ancient Settlements in the UAE
- Archaeology of the United Arab Emirates
