= Karen Frifelt =

Danish archaeologist and librarian

Karen Frifelt (15 September 1925 — 6 December 2012) was a Danish archaeologist and librarian who took a prominent role in the definition of three major cultures in the early history of the United Arab Emirates and Oman.

Frifelt was a pioneer of Arabian Gulf Archaeology. In 1959 she was the first woman to participate in Peter Glob’s Archaeological expedition to Bahrain. Later she directed the expedition's field operation in Abu Dhabi from 1966 becoming the first female archaeologist to work in the Trucial States (later to become the United Arab Emirates). In 1972 Frifelt became the first archaeologist to lead an expedition into the Sultanate of Oman.

In Abu Dhabi she was for years in charge of Moesgaard Museum's excavations at the now UNESCO World Heritage Site of Hili. During a meeting between Frifelt and the ruler and founding father of the United Arabi Emirates Sheikh Zayed al Nahyan the latter expressed admiration for Karan Frifelt's courage. Zayed commended how Frifelt as a female had left her own country to travel to an unknown and distant place such as Abu Dhabi to explore its prehistory. Zayed told Karen he wished women of his nation would someday display the same kind of enterprise.

In Oman the 1972 expedition led by Frifelt discovered the archaeological landscapes of Bat later also inscribed as a UNESCO world heritage site. Frifelt surveyed and excavated in Oman in the years 1972–1978, 1985–1986, and 1989.

In 2004 Soren Blau from the University of Adelaide, Australia, published a biographical article in Arabian Archaeology and Epigraphy, that highlighted the pioneering work of Karen Frifelt and her legendary female colleague Beatrice de Cardi.

== Early life and later career ==
Frifelt was the daughter of Danish writer Salomon Jensen Frifelt, and a first cousin of Bertel Haarder a member of the Danish parliament and former Minister of Culture. She was born in Ölgod, West Jutland, and lived for many years and until the time of her death near Moesgaard Museum in the Aarhus suburb of Höjbjerg. Frifelt never married and did not have children. In 1942 as a high school student in Tarm, Karen Frifelt won a national writing competition by J. H. Schultz publishers among 36,000 other students by writing a historic essay. In 1944 she enrolled at Aarhus University. Before 1959 Frifelt traveled to Yugoslavia and Turkey to visit ongoing excavations. She spent four field seasons in Anatolia, visiting and working at Hittite period excavation sites. and conducted a stay at the UN Library in New York, and travelled to Mexico to study ancient cultures. She obtained a Mag.art.(magister artium) degree in 1961. In 1965 Frifelt translated Sir Mortimer Wheeler's 1959 book Early India and Pakistan: To Ashoka into Danish.

== Archaeology ==
In the 1970s together with then student Jens Vellev and others, Frifelt directed new excavations in the United Arab Emirates. In 1970 she contributed to Abu Dhabi's pavilion at the 1970 World Expo in Osaka, Japan. Abu Dhabi's pavilion featured a presentation of the Danish archaeological expedition's recent discoveries from Umm Al Nar Island and the Al Ain Oasis. On that occasion the emirate presented Frifelt with the gold pin and medal – Progress and Harmony for Mankind - “Speed of Progress” for her contributions. Later in life Frifelt was employed at Moesgaard Museum's Oriental Department and at the Royal Library - Aarhus. During her time in the Oriental department, she published numerous scientific papers and books including two volumes on the UNESCO world heritage site at the Umm Al Nar island excavations in Abu Dhabi, and a book on Islamic Remains in Bahrain. For years Frifelt worked closely with Geoffrey Bibby organizing the records and finds of Moesgaard Museum and Aarhus University's Arabian Gulf expeditions.

Frifelt was responsible for defining the distinct Hafit Period in UAE history, predating the Umm Al Nar period. Frifelt, in preparing a Festschrift for Glob’s sixtieth birthday, linked the pottery taken from the burials the team had excavated by Jebel Hafit to the Sumerian Jemdet Nasr period (3100–2900 BCE). The discovery led to further excavations in the following two years – and a clear delineation of the Hafit Period (3200–2600 BCE).

She was also responsible for the first discovery of Wadi Suq period (2,000 to 1,300 BCE) burials. Frifelt mapped a field of some 400 graves in the Wadi Suq, inland of Sohar in Oman.

== Publications ==
- Frifelt, K. 1971: Jemdat Nasr Graves in the Oman. Kuml 1970, p. 355‑383.
- Frifelt, K. 1974: Murwab. Report on file at Moesgaard Museum p. 1-3.
- Frifelt, K. 1975: On Prehistoric Settlement and Chronology of the Oman Peninsula. EAST AND WEST, New Series Vol. 25. Nos. 3‑4. IsMEO, Rome, p. 359‑424.
- Frifelt, K. 1975: A possible Link between the Jemdet Nasr and the Umm an-Nar Graves of Oman. Journal of Oman Studies 1, p. 57‑80.
- Frifelt, K. 1975: Archäologische Forschungen am Persischen Golf. Antike Welt. Zeitschrift für Archäologie und Urgeschichte no. 2, p. 15‑24.
- Frifelt, K. 1979: The Umm an-Nar and Jemdet Nasr of Oman and their Relations abroad. South Asian Archaeology 1975, Leiden p. 43‑57.
- Frifelt, K. 1980: “Jemdet Nasr Graves” on the Oman Peninsula. Mesopotamia: Copenhagen Studies in Assyriology 8, p. 273‑279.
- Frifelt, K. 1985: Further Evidence of the Third Millennium BC Town at Bat in Oman. Journal of Oman Studies 7, p. 89‑104.
- Frifelt K. 1991: The Island of Umm an-Nar, vol. 1. Third Millennium Graves. Jutland Archaeological Society Publications 26 (1), Aarhus.
- Frifelt K. 1995: The Island of Umm an-Nar, vol. 2. The Third Millennium Settlement. Jutland Archaeological Society Publications 26 (2), Aarhus.
- Frifelt, K. 2001: Islamic Remains in Bahrain. Jutland Archaeological Society Publications vol. 37. Højbjerg.
- Frifelt, K. 2002: Did the Umm an-Nar Graves Originate in Oman? Essays on the Late Prehistory of the Arabian Peninsula. Ed. Is. I. A. O. Serie Orientale Roma, vol. XCIII p. 317‑335.
