= Dark Millennium (United Arab Emirates) =

Emirati period from 4000 to 3200 BCE

The Dark Millennium in the United Arab Emirates refers to the period between 4000 BCE and 3200 BCE, which sits between its Bifacial Neolithic era and the emergence of the Bronze Age Hafit period.

Its name is derived from the abandonment of the west coast of Southeastern Arabia at the time due to harsh aridity and desertification, a period in which the archaeological record of human habitation and activity to the west of the Hajar Mountains goes notably 'dark'.

== Background ==
Habitation in the area by anthropologically modern humans has been dated back to 125,000 BCE, the migration of humans from Africa to populate Earth through the Southern Corridor. Evidence of earlier hominin population goes back to 210,000 BCE with finds at Faya and to 200,000 BCE at Jebel Barakah in Abu Dhabi.

However, during the glacial maximum period of the Pleistocene ice age, 68,000 to 8000 BCE, Southeastern Arabia is thought to have been uninhabitable. At the time, global sea levels were some 150 m (490 ft) lower and the Persian Gulf was a broad valley with slow moving river systems and lakes, home to communities of Paleolithic hunter-gatherers.

As the Pleistocene gave way to the post-glacial Holocene, from approximately 18,000 BCE to 11,500 BCE, sea levels rose and the Gulf Oasis flooded. Evidence of settlements and associated burials begin to emerge on the coastal areas of the current sea from approximately 8,000 BCE, with some sixty population centres identified from this time.

Finds from the Stone Age Arabian Bifacial and Ubaid cultures (including knapped stone arrow and axe heads as well as Ubaid pottery) show human habitation in the area in the fifth to fourth millennia BCE and define a linkage between the human settlements of the Gulf and those of Mesopotamia. The inland necropolis at Jebel Buhais in Sharjah, in particular, displays evidence of the use of sophisticated flint tools, axes, spearheads and arrowheads by a pastoralist people who also fished using both hooks and nets. These communities populated Southeastern Arabia, southern Oman and Yemen.

== Dark Millennium ==
The Neolithic Arabian Bifacial/Ubaid period came to an abrupt end in eastern Arabia and the Oman peninsula at 4000 BC, just after the phase of lake lowering and onset of dune reactivation, which saw the abandonment of the area to the west of the Hajar Mountains. This period, the Dark Millennium, sees virtually no evidence of human activity on the west coast of Southeastern Arabia over the third millennium BCE, while there is abundant evidence of human occupation on the east coast. This is thought to be consistent with changing patterns of human settlement as a result of climate change, with a spring discovered at Jebel Buhais drying up at this time, an event contemporaneous with similar discoveries (including cave stalagmites in Oman) pointing to increased aridity in the interior of Southeastern Arabia. While the necropolis of Buhais is rich in burials from the 5th to 4th millennium BCE, the absence of any activity over the subsequent period is dramatic.

A unique exception to the lack of evidence of human occupation of the area comes from Akab Island in Umm Al Quwain, where a ritualistic dugong bone mound was discovered. The mound, which consists of structurally aligned dugong bones littered with jewelry and other artefacts, has been dated to 3500–3200 BCE.

Likely following further climatic change, the emergence of the Hafit people, named for the first find site of their distinctive beehive burials on the foothills of Jebel Hafit in Al Ain, brought the Dark Millennium to an end in approximately 3200 BCE. A continuity in links to Mesopotamia is evidenced by finds of Jemdet Nasr pottery in Hafit burials. The Hafit people appear to have returned from the area to the east of the Hajar Mountains with a knowledge of copper smelting and production, producing the first evidence of copper use in southeastern Arabia.

The Hafit period therefore defines early Bronze Age human settlement in the United Arab Emirates and Oman in the period from 3200 to 2600 BCE, at which time the Umm Al Nar culture predominates. Hafit period tombs and remains have also been located across the UAE and Oman in sites such as Bidaa bint Saud, Jebel Buhais and Al Ain/Buraimi.

Re-occupation of the west coast during the Hafit era is also testified by carbon dated finds of shell middens at Al Daith, Jazirat Al Hamra and Ras Al Khaimah.

== See also ==
- History of the United Arab Emirates
- Archaeology of the United Arab Emirates
