= Archaeological Sites of Bat, Al-Khutm and Al-Ayn =

UNESCO World Heritage sites in Oman

UNESCO World Heritage Site
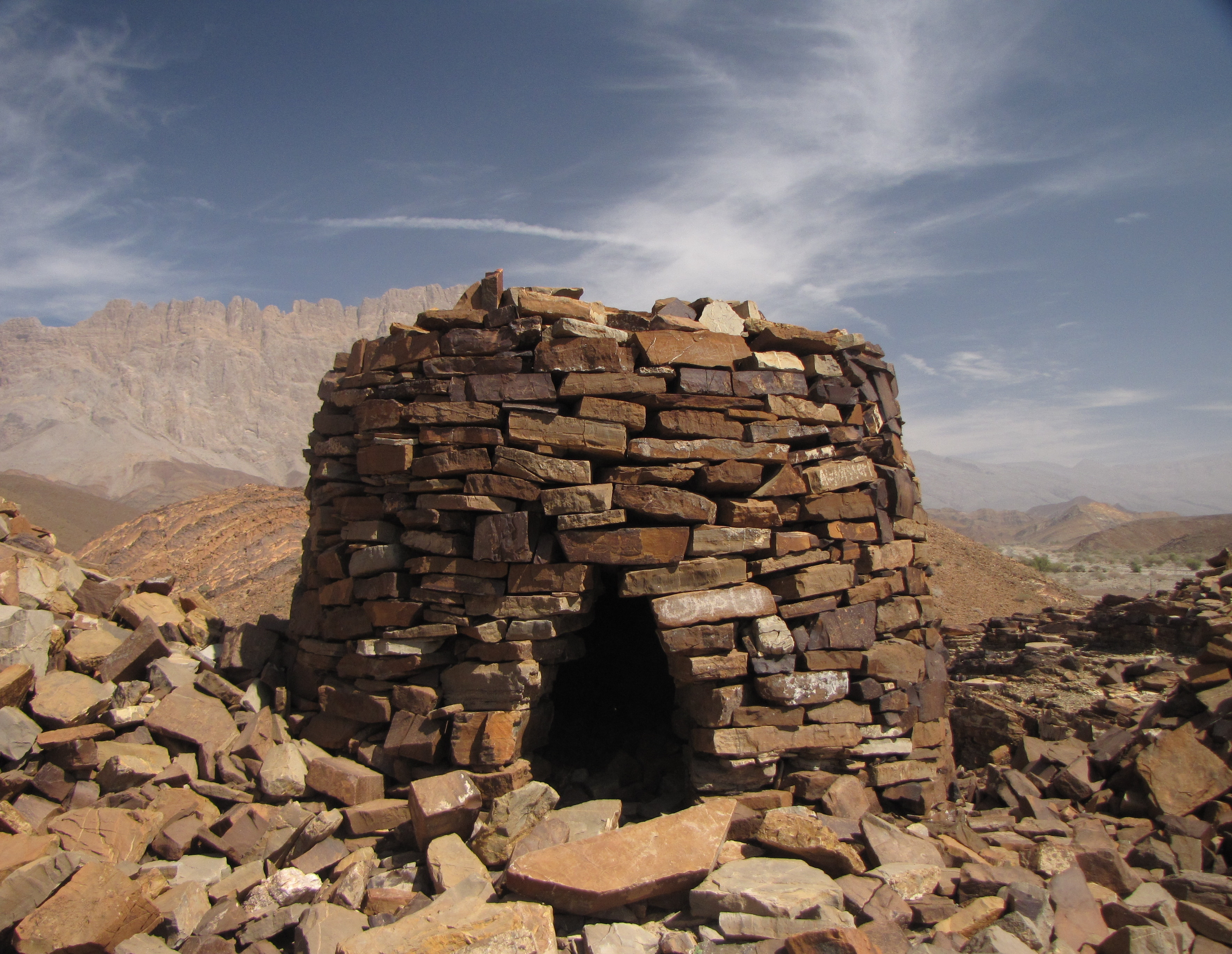
- Burial mound at the site of Al-Ayn, with the Hajar Mountains in the background

- Location within Oman Location within Middle East Location within West and Central Asia
- Location: Al Dhahira region, Oman
- Includes: Bāt (بَات); Al-Khuṭm (ٱلْخُطْم); Al-ʿAyn (ٱلْعَيْن)
- Criteria: Cultural: (iii), (iv)
- Reference: 434
- Inscription: 1988 (12th Session)
- Coordinates: 23°16′11.5″N 56°44′42″E

The Archaeological Sites of Bat, Al-Khutm and Al-Ayn (Arabic: ٱلْمَوَاقِع ٱلْأَثَرِيَّة فِيْ بَات وَٱلْخُطْم وَٱلْعَيْن, romanized: Al-Mawāqiʿ al-Athariyyah fī Bāt wal-Khuṭm wal-ʿAyn) are a group of beehive tombs or necropolis from the Hafit period in the 3rd Millennium BC, located near a palm grove in Oman. They were declared World Heritage by UNESCO in 1988, becoming only the second such Omani site after the Bahla Fort was designated world heritage in 1987.

== History or prehistory ==
Studies during the last 15 years have shown the existence of numerous human settlements ranging from the Persian Gulf to the Gulf of Oman.

=== Bat ===
The site of Bat is located inside a palm grove. Around 3000 B.C., there was an intense trade of copper (extracted locally) and stone (probably diorite) with Sumerians. The necropolis consists of 100 graves and circular buildings each with a diameter of about 20 metres (66 feet). These buildings have no outside openings, so besides the possibility of their ritualistic function, they may have been used as tanks or silos. Their precise function is as of yet unknown. In 1972, the excavations carried out by a Danish team led by Karen Frifelt showed that the area has been continuously inhabited for 4000 years.

=== Al-Khutm ===
The ruins at Al-Khutm are thought to have derived from a stone fort, with a tower made of rock with a diameter of 20 metres (66 feet). They are located 2 kilometres (1.2 miles) west of Bat.

=== Al-Ayn ===
Al-Ayn is a small necropolis, although it is in the best condition of the three necropolises. It is located 22 kilometres (14 miles) southeast of Bat.

== Conservation ==
The sites have not been subjected to restoration or other types of conservation before the protection provided by UNESCO, so their isolation has been their only protection. One of the greatest dangers concerning the sites preservation comes from locals who take building material from the archaeological sites.

== Development ==
A road between Oman and Saudi Arabia, which goes through the villages, was completed in September 2021. Measuring between 700 and 800 kilometres (430 and 500 miles) in total, it extends from the town of Ibri in Oman to Al-Ahsa in eastern Saudi Arabia. The Omani side of the road measures approximately 160 km (99 miles), and the Saudi side 580 km (360 miles).

== See also ==
- Al Ain, a city with archaeological sites in the United Arab Emirates
  - Bidaa Bint Saud
  - Hili Archaeological Park
  - Rumailah, UAE
- Al-Buraimi
- Hafit period
- Jabal Hafit
- Umm al-Nar culture
- Wadi Al Helo
