= Wadi Al Helo =

- Town
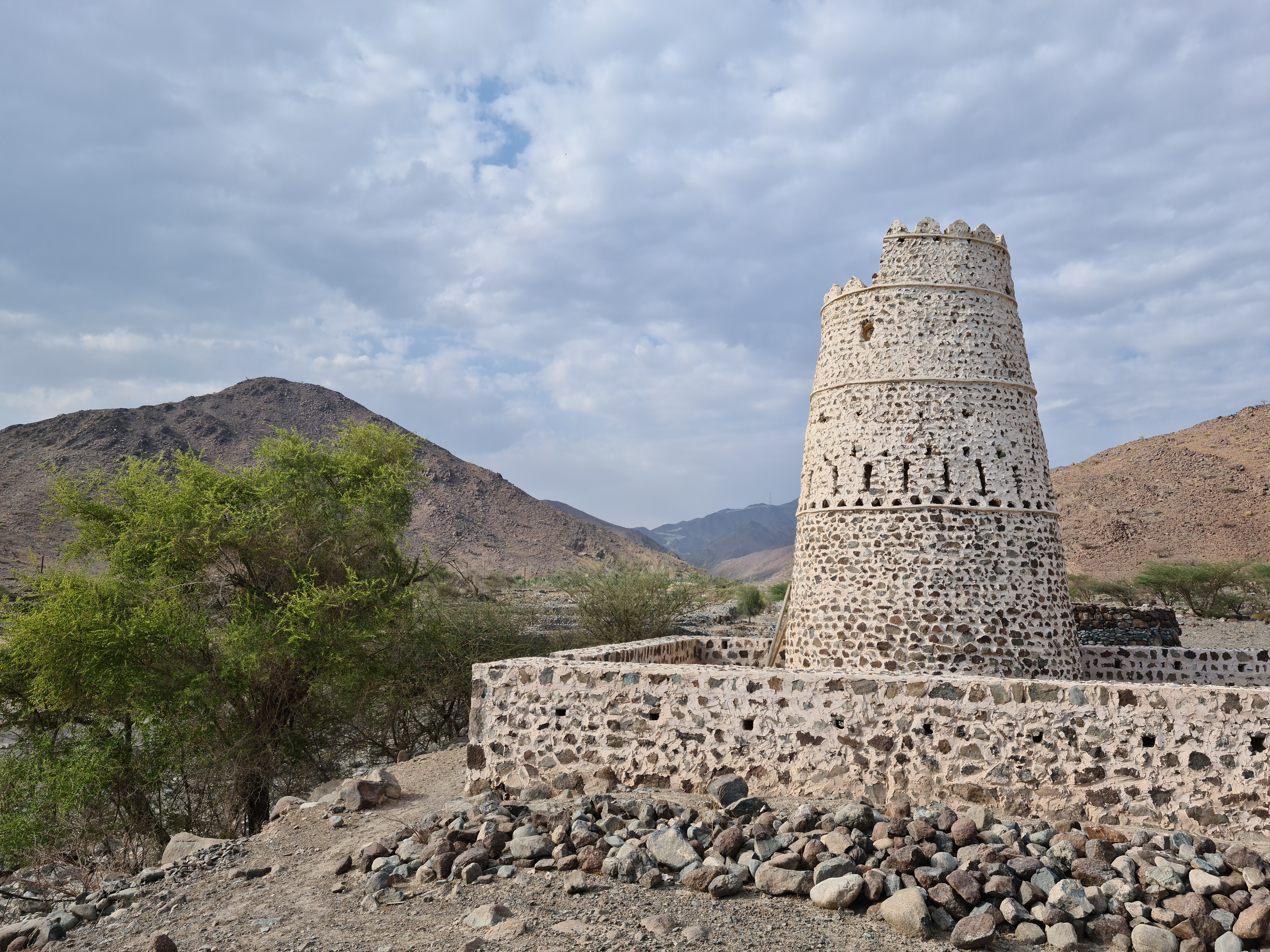
- Wadi Al Helo Watchtower

- Location within United Arab Emirates
- Coordinates: 24°56′33″N 56°12′20″E
- Country: United Arab Emirates
- Emirate: Sharjah
- Elevation: 216 m (709 ft)

Wadi Al Helo (Arabic: وادي الحلو, literally 'the sweet Valley') is a village in Sharjah in the United Arab Emirates (UAE). Wadi Al Helo lies on the Sharjah to Kalba Road (E102), about 26 kilometres (16 mi) southwest of Kalba.

The settlement is situated in the seasonal watercourse, or wadi, of the same name Wadi Al Helo. Many people have died in Wadi Al Helo valley as result of seasonal flooding. The most recent recorded incident was on May 30, 2020, when a one-year-old boy and six-year-old girl both drowned in the Wadi Al Helo tragedy.

== Natural formations ==
Wadi Al Helo, as its name suggests, is a valley called sweet because its water is fresh, and the valley used to flow for several months, but now, due to climate change and lack of rain, the valley's water has dried up, which has forced residents to dig wells to extract groundwater for use in agriculture.

== Heritage status ==
The wider Wadi Al Helo area contains archaeological remains dating from the Bronze Age and later periods. These include evidence of copper mining, smelting and casting, as well as rock art associated with prehistoric movement and exchange networks in the Hajar Mountains.

Wadi Al Helo is included in the UNESCO World Heritage Tentative List under the name Wadi Al Helo: Testimony of Bronze Age Copper Production. The property was submitted by the United Arab Emirates on 1 February 2023 and is listed as a cultural property under criteria (iii), (iv) and (v).
