= Wadi Al Helo (wadi) =

- Location within United Arab Emirates Location within Asia
- Coordinates: 24°56′33″N 56°12′20″E
- Country: United Arab Emirates
- Emirate: Sharjah
- Elevation: 216 m (709 ft)

Wadi Al Helo (Arabic: وادي الحلو, literally 'Sweet wadi') is a seasonal watercourse located in the Hajar Mountains of Sharjah, in the United Arab Emirates. The wadi runs northwest to southeast of the eponymous village of Wadi Helo, located on the Sharjah-Kalba highway.

== Extent ==
The wadi is a 'y' shaped waterway, one branch passing through the villages of Harrah and Wadi Al Helo, while the other runs down from the Wadi Al Helo lagoon, located further along the old Sharjah-Kalba highway towards Kalba. The new highway opened in October 2020, runs 26km from Wadi Al Helo to Kalba. The two branches of Wadi Al Helo meet west of the village of Awhala and the wadi passes through Awhala and beside the historic Awhala Fort before crossing the Omani border and fanning out to the Batinah plain and the Gulf of Oman north of the Omani coastal village of Bu Baqarah. The lower reaches of the wadi are lined to either side with a number of pre-Islamic burials.

Wadi Al Helo is traditionally home to the Mazari tribe and was a wealthy tobacco growing centre. Today the upper reaches of the wadi are dotted with hundreds of abandoned stone-lined tobacco plantations. Villagers from the village of Hayl would travel to Wadi Al Helo seasonally to take part in harvesting the tobacco crop, which would be sold to local traders in Fujairah and Sharjah.

== Archaeology ==
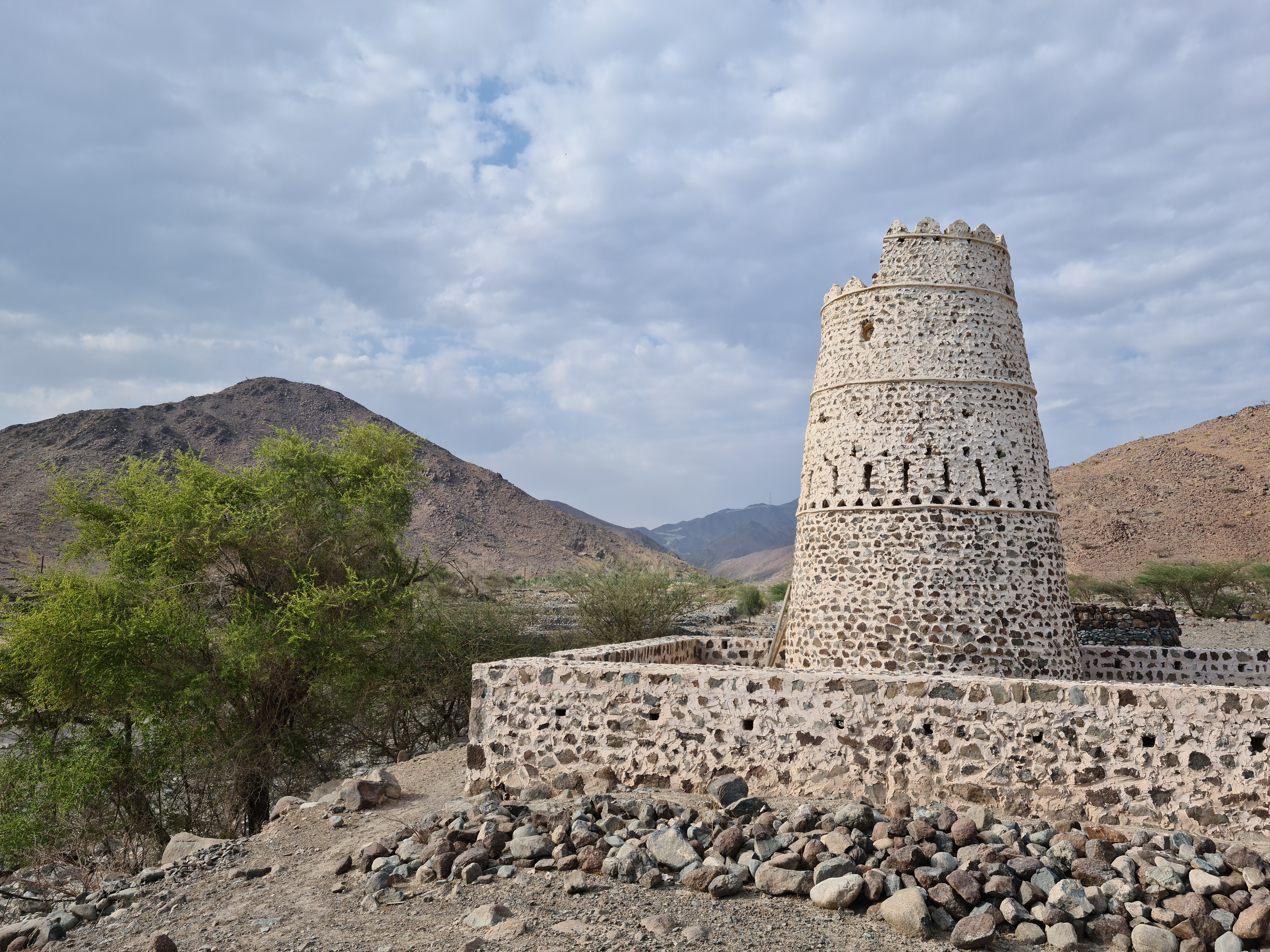
A watchtower in the Wadi Al Helo.

Wadi Helo contains archaeological remains dating from the Neolithic period through the Bronze Age and later periods, reflecting the long-term use of the wadi and its surrounding mountains. Archaeological investigations have identified evidence of prehistoric settlement and activity, including the exploitation of local resources and later agricultural and settlement remains.

One of the most significant archaeological areas is HLO1, a Bronze Age copper-mining and smelting site located in the upper part of the wadi. Excavations revealed areas for crushing and sorting copper ore, metallurgical furnaces, slag deposits and other features associated with copper production. Nearby ore occurrences provide evidence for the exploitation of copper resources in the surrounding mountains. The site formed part of the wider network of copper production and exchange in southeastern Arabia during the Bronze Age, with archaeological evidence indicating connections between communities in the Hajar Mountains and regions beyond southeastern Arabia.

Archaeological investigations have also documented evidence of later occupation and reuse of the area. At HLO1 and nearby locations, remains include later structures, graves and other features associated with the continued use of the wadi and its resources. The archaeological landscape therefore complements the later agricultural and settlement remains preserved in the historic village of Wadi Al Helo.

== Heritage status ==
The heritage site of Wadi Al Helo is located north of the modern settlement. It includes three watchtowers that guarded the wadi and an abandoned settlement containing extensive and sophisticated farmhouses, including the house of Eisa Al Thabbahi, which reflects the considerable wealth of the 19th-century agricultural community of Wadi Al Helo. A reconstructed Bronze Age tomb is located alongside the village fort. The settlement was abandoned in or around the 1930s. The area has been preserved as an archaeological site by the government of Sharjah. It was included in an earlier Sharjah proposal for UNESCO World Heritage status under the heading Sharjah, Gateway to the Trucial States, which was associated with a number of heritage sites in the emirate. Wadi Al Helo is currently included in the UNESCO World Heritage Tentative List under the name Wadi Al Helo: Testimony of Bronze Age Copper Production. The property was submitted by the United Arab Emirates on 1 February 2023 and is listed as a cultural property under criteria (iii), (iv) and (v). The proposed property covers approximately 84 km² and encompasses archaeological remains associated with Bronze Age copper mining and smelting, as well as rock art and other evidence of prehistoric activity and regional networks.

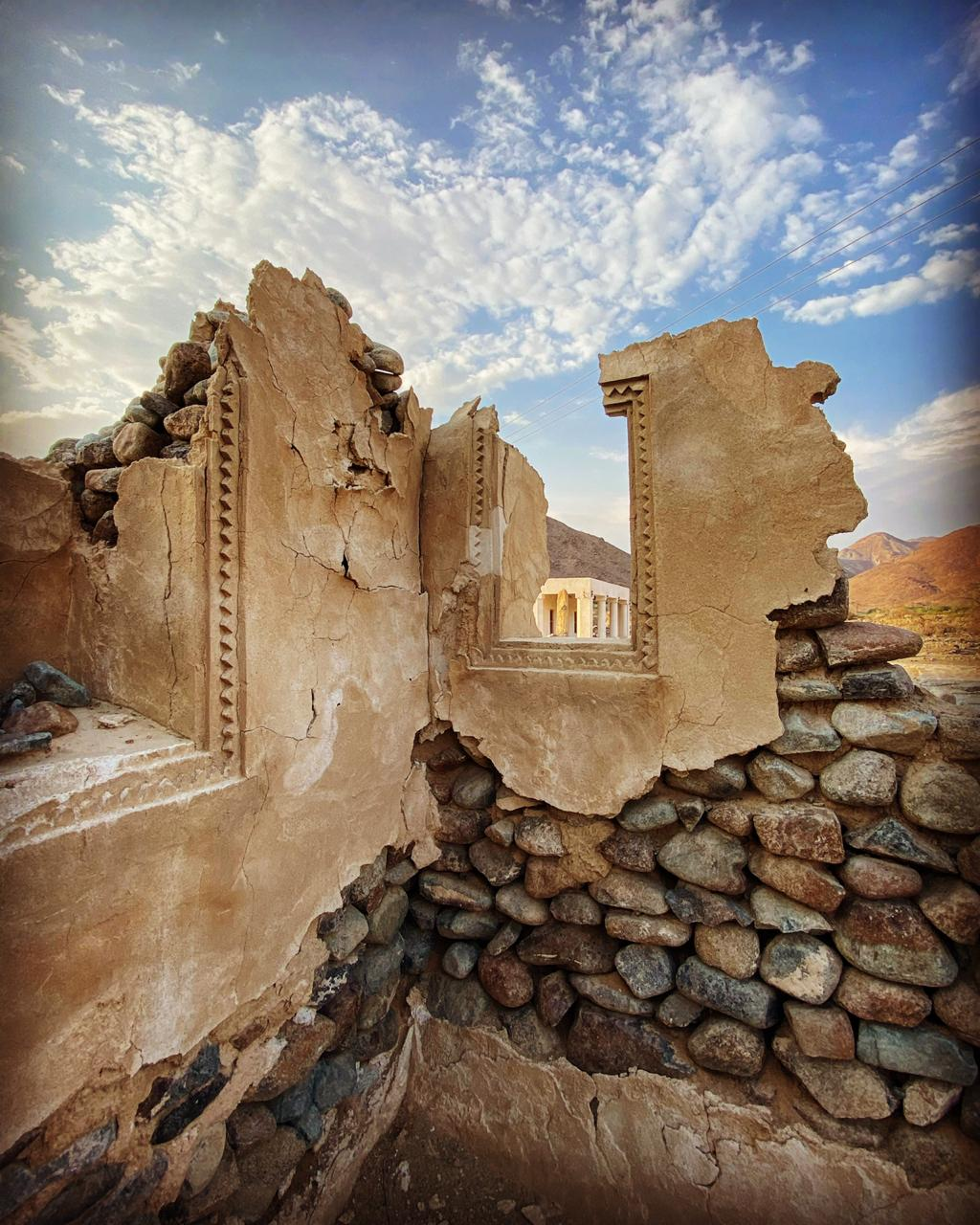
A farmhouse in the Wadi Al Helo heritage village

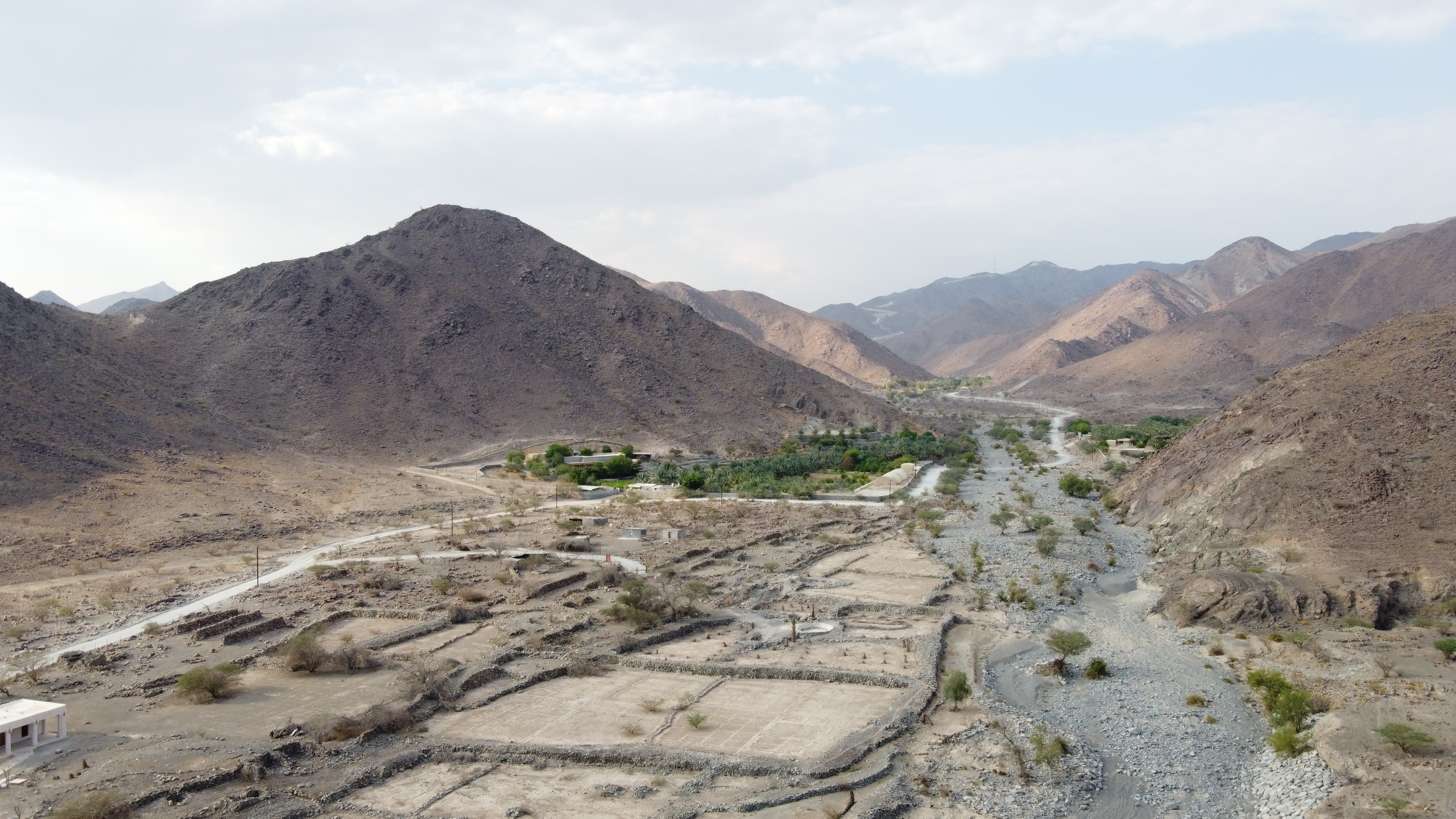
Abandoned tobacco fields sit alongside modern farming areas in the Wadi Al Helo

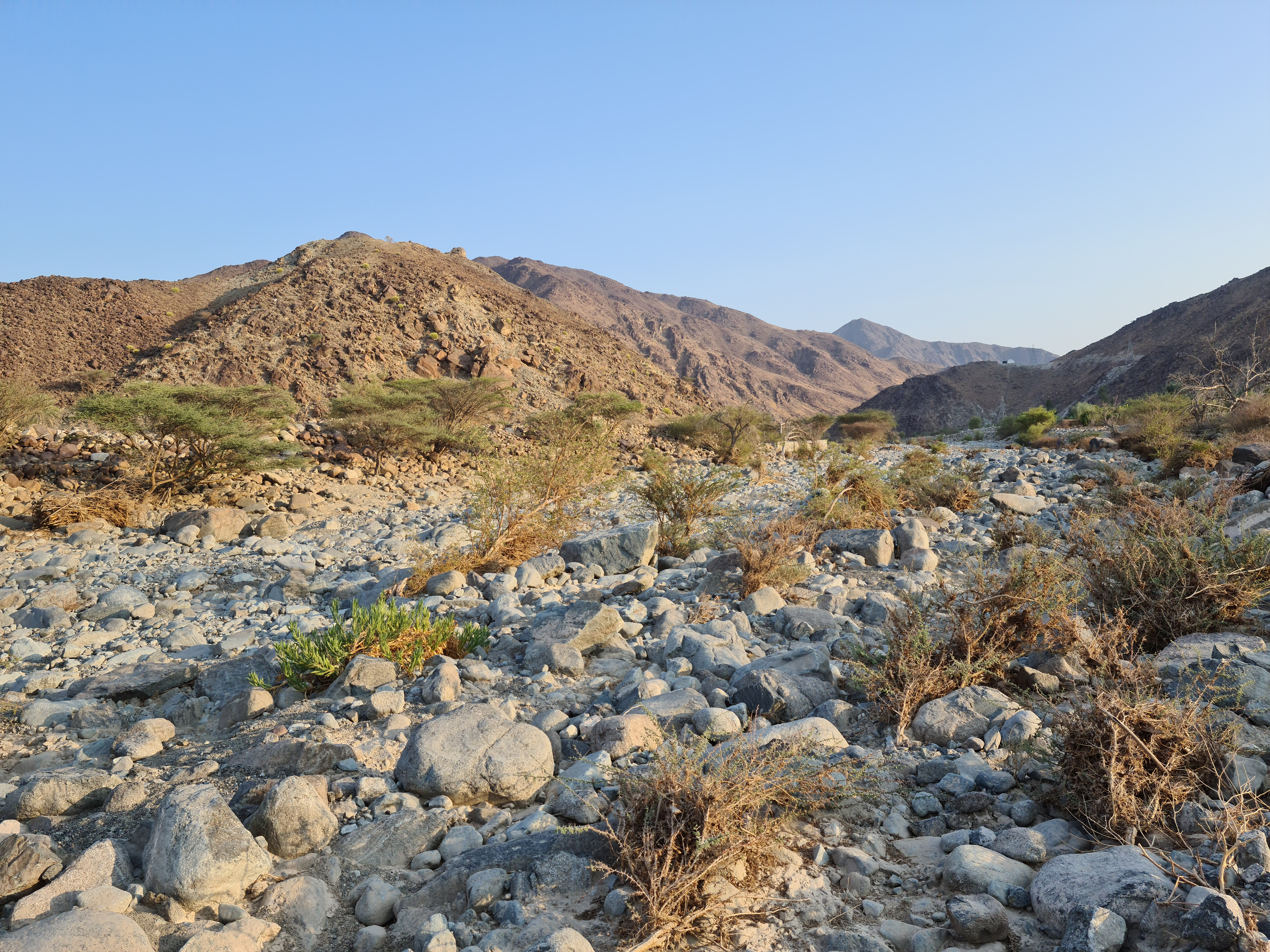
The Wadi Al Helo seasonal watercourse

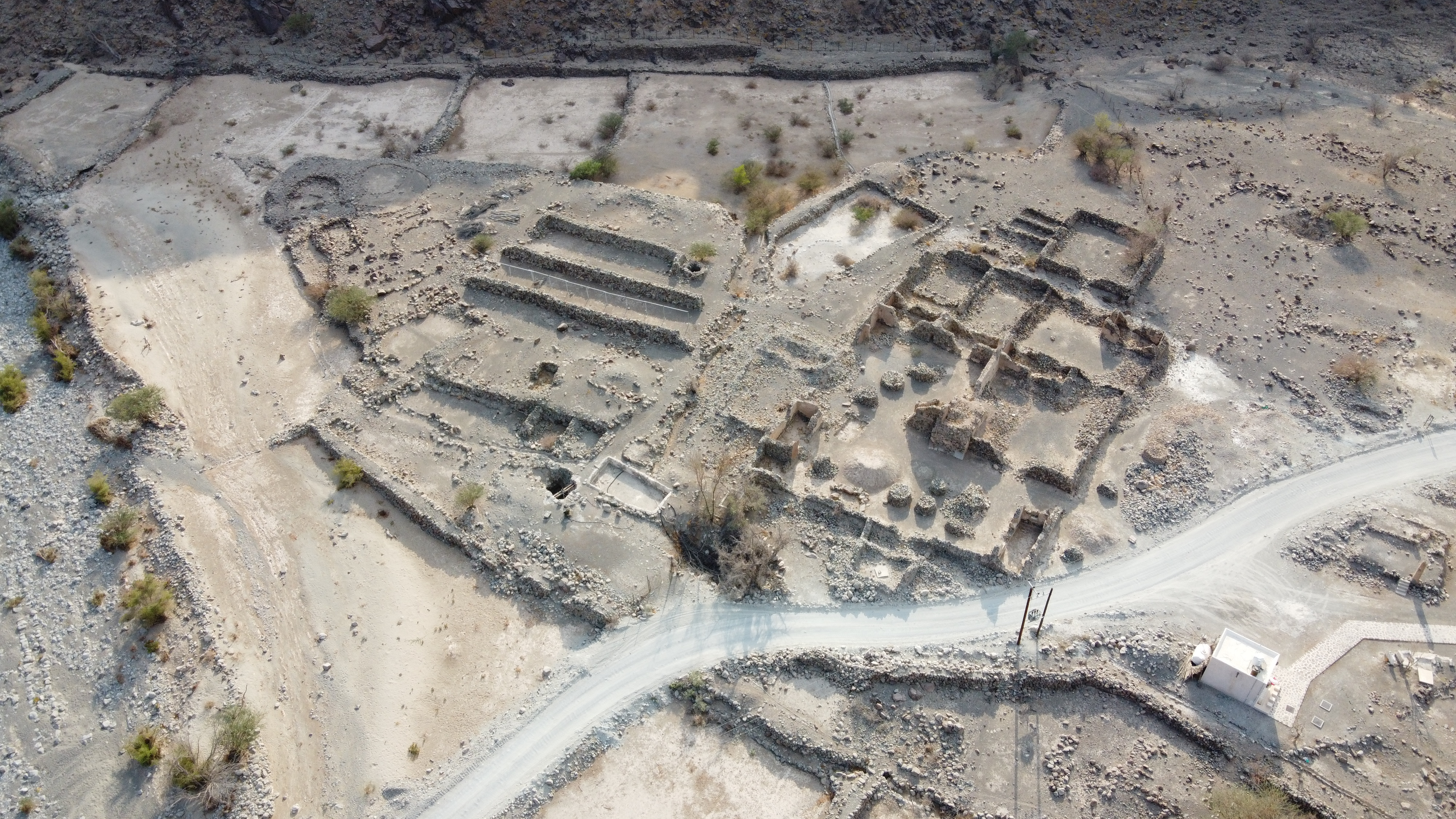
A farmhouse shows the extent of what was, for its time, an unusually large and sophisticated building.

== See also ==
- List of wadis of the United Arab Emirates

== Bibliography ==
Kutterer, Johannes (2020). The Archaeological Site HLO1: A Bronze Age Copper Mining and Smelting Site in the Emirate of Sharjah (U.A.E.). Sharjah Archaeology Authority, Government of Sharjah. ISBN 978-9948-25-729-5.

Kutterer, Johannes; Jasim, Sabah A. (2009). "First report on the copper-smelting site HLO-1 in Wādī al-Hilo, UAE". Proceedings of the Seminar for Arabian Studies. 39: 245–254.

Uerpmann, Margarethe; Uerpmann, Hans-Peter; Hinderer, Matthias; Lindauer, Susanne; Neureiter, Christina; Ghukasyan, Robert; Kesejyan, Suren; Petrosyan, Arthur (2018). "HLO1-south: An Early Neolithic site in Wadi al-Hilo (Sharjah, UAE)". Arabian Archaeology and Epigraphy. 29 (1): 1–9. doi:10.1111/aae.12107.
