= Hafit period =

Early Bronze Age human settlement period

Hafit culture
- Geographical range: Eastern Arabia
- Period: Bronze Age
- Dates: c. 3200 BC – 2600 BC
- Preceded by: Dark Millennium
- Followed by: Umm Al Nar culture

The Hafit period defines early Bronze Age human settlement in the United Arab Emirates and Oman in the period from 3200 to 2600 B.C, during the period of Prehistoric Arabia. It is named after the distinctive beehive burials first found on Jebel Hafit, a rocky mountain near Al Ain, bordering the Rub Al Khali desert. Hafit period tombs and remains have also been located across the UAE and Oman in sites such as Bidaa bint Saud, Jebel Buhais and Buraimi.

The Hafit people repopulated the area to the west of the Hajar Mountains following a period of intense aridity which saw the abandonment of the area during what is known as the Dark Millennium.

== Discoveries ==
The first find of Hafit era tombs is attributed to the Danish archaeologist PV Glob of the University of Aarhus in 1959, who was not only the first archaeologist (together with Geoffrey Bibby) to dig in the United Arab Emirates, but who found the graves that defined the Umm Al Nar period. Visiting Al Ain in the company of Zayed bin Sultan Al Nahyan, Glob and Bibby were shown the vast field of tumuli and the first of many excavations of these took place a few years later. However, it was not Glob but a member of his team, Karen Frifelt, who realised that the Hafit graves represented a culturally distinct, earlier, period when she was preparing a Festschrift for Glob's 60th birthday in 1970.

Located in the area south of the city of Al Ain, the Jebel Hafeet Desert Park contains the original necropolis of Hafit Graves which led to the naming of this period in the human history of the emirates. A series of ridges leading from the main part of Jebel Hafit toward Al Ain each harbour groups of Hafit tombs.

Finds at Jebel Hafit include the remains of some 317 circular stone tombs and settlements from the Hafit period, as well as wells and partially underground falaj irrigation systems, as well as mud brick constructions intended for a range of defensive, domestic and economic purposes. The Al Ain Oasis, in particular, provides evidence of construction and water management enabling the early development of agriculture for five millennia, up until the present day.

Pottery finds at Hafit period sites demonstrate trading links to Mesopotamia, contiguous to the Jemdat Nasr period (3100 – 2900 B.C.). Evidence of trading links with Mesopotamia are also found in the subsequent Umm Al Nar and Wadi Suq periods of UAE history.

Finds have shown that locally manufactured pottery emerged during the transitional period between the Hafit and Umm Al Nar periods, approximately 2800 to 2700 BCE It is now thought the transition between the two cultural periods is marked by a decline in links between Southeastern Arabia and Mesopotamia, a pattern that would be repeated, albeit more emphatically, in the transitional period between the Umm Al Nar and Wadi Suq cultures.

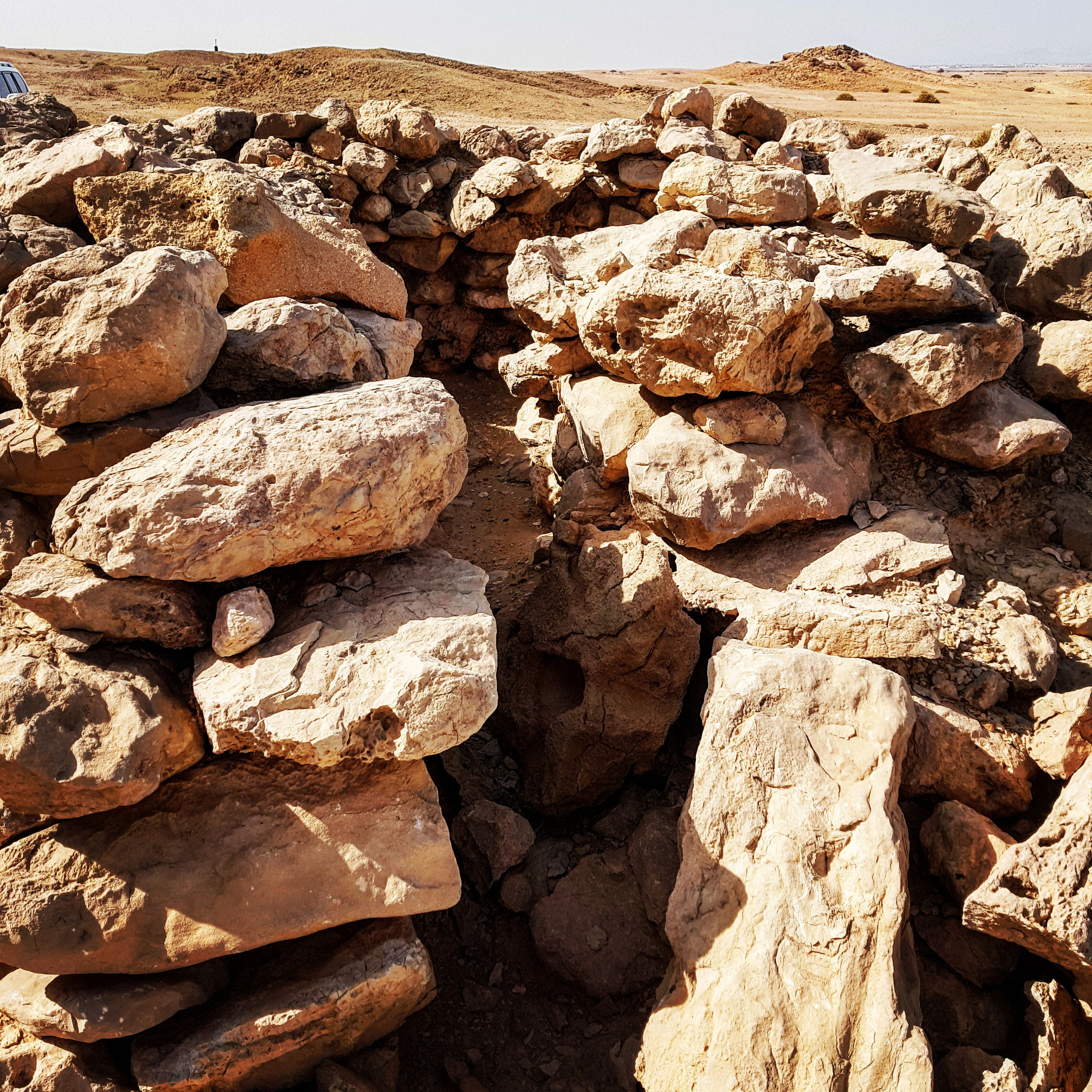
An unrestored beehive tomb from the Hafit period at Jebel Hafeet, on the border of the U.A.E. and Oman. Most of the hundreds of tombs to be found at the eastern foothills of the mountain have collapsed.

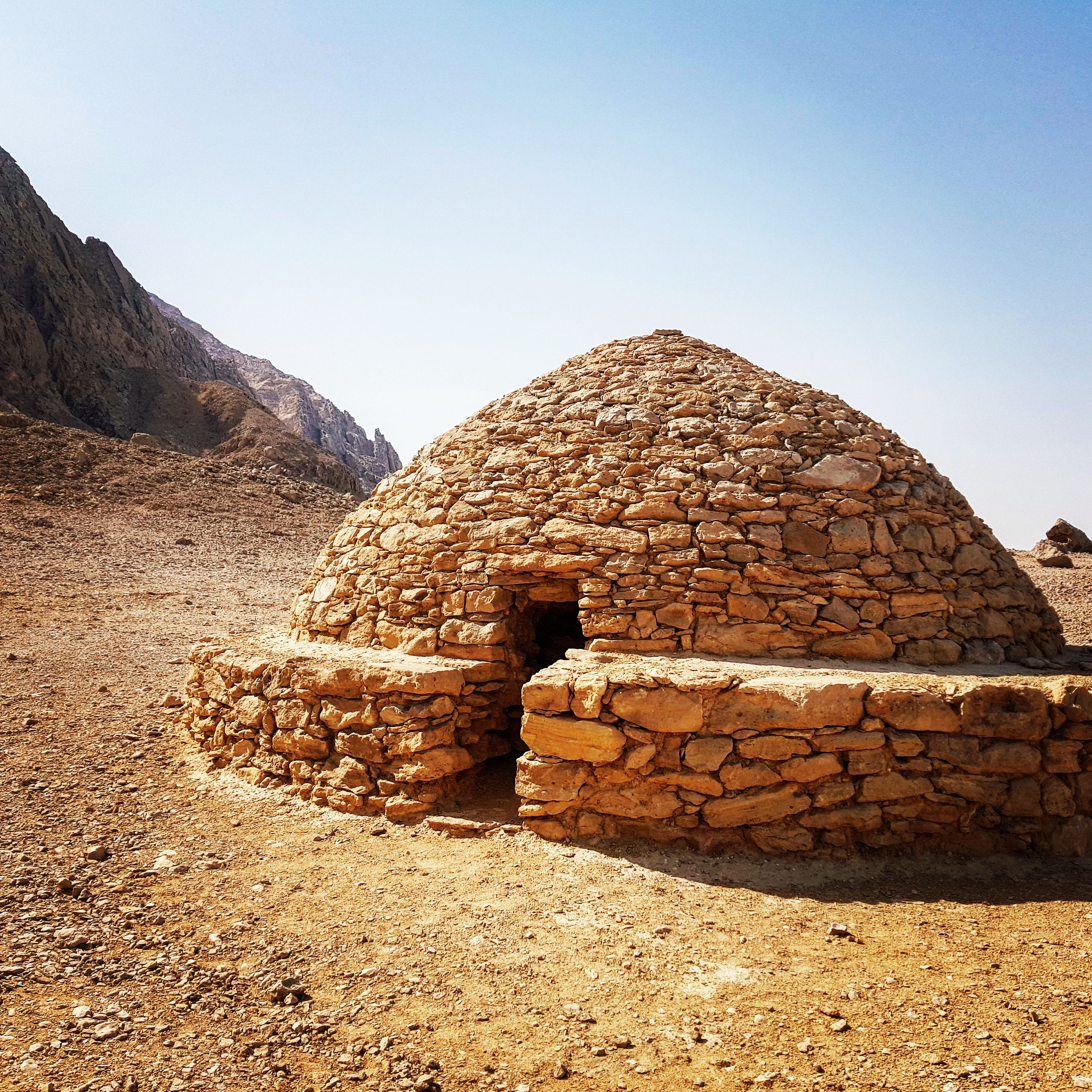
One of a small cluster of Hafit-period beehive tombs at the Mezyad – Jebel Hafeet Desert Park near Al Ain City in the Eastern Region of Abu Dhabi, which have been restored to show their original construction

== See also ==
- Hili Archaeological Park
- List of Ancient Settlements in the UAE
- List of cultural property of national significance in the United Arab Emirates
