= Kindi =

Kindi may refer to:

- Al-Kindi (surname)
- Kindi Department, department of Boulkiemdé, Burkina Faso
  - Kindi, Kindi, its capital
- Kindi, Andemtenga, a town in Andemtenga Department, Burkina Faso
- Kindi (Tanzanian ward), Moshi Rural district, Kilimanjaro Region, Tanzania
- Kindi (vessel), an Indian bell metal vessel usually found in traditional Kerala homes

== See also ==
- Kindai (disambiguation)
- Guindy (disambiguation)
- Kunud, a Bedouin tribe of the United Arab Emirates
