= Al Hayl Fort =

Hayl Fort
- Location within United Arab Emirates
- Coordinates: 25.103619°N 56.287247°E
- Country: United Arab Emirates
- Emirate: Fujairah

Al Hayl Fort is located in the Wadi Hayl, to the West of Fujairah, in the United Arab Emirates. Constructed in 1932 by Sheikh Abdullah bin Hamdan Al Sharqi, the fort formed his principle residence for the following two decades. Consisting of a fortified courtyard house and an associated watchtower with commanding views to the East and West of Wadi Hayl, Al Hayl Fort overlooks the old village of Al Hayl, of which many buildings have now been restored. The village was abandoned in the late 1970s following the resettlement of its inhabitants to a new village further down the wadi, a seasonal watercourse, and protected by the Al Hayl Dam. The village was traditionally settled by members of the Kunud tribe (In 1908, Lorimer described the village, which he named 'Hail' as being located 'inside the hills behind Fujairah' and consisting of 'around ten houses of Jalajilah and Kunud'), with evidence that the area has been settled since the Umm Al Nar period, with Umm Al Nar tombs and Iron Age petroglyphs both found in the area. A number of these are now being threatened by ongoing construction in the area.

== Construction ==
In 1932, Abdullah bin Hamdan constructed the fortified house, a mosque, a majlis and the watchtower. The house was constructed by the Bin Shamal family, builders who worked in Kalba and Fujairah, as well as a builder by the name of Bin Shambi. The buildings are all constructed of gabbro/dolerite rocks bound with a soft mud mortar and faced with plaster. To the interiors, a gypsum plaster was used. The woodwork of the buildings was mangrove with hardwood planking.

The watchtower at Al Hayl was originally constructed as a residence for Sheikh Abdullah's younger brother, Suhail, who later moved to a house in the Wadi Furfar.

Al Hayl Fort has often been referred to as a summer house, however it was Abdullah bin Hamdan Al Sharqi's residence until he moved to a house constructed in Mirbah in 1958.

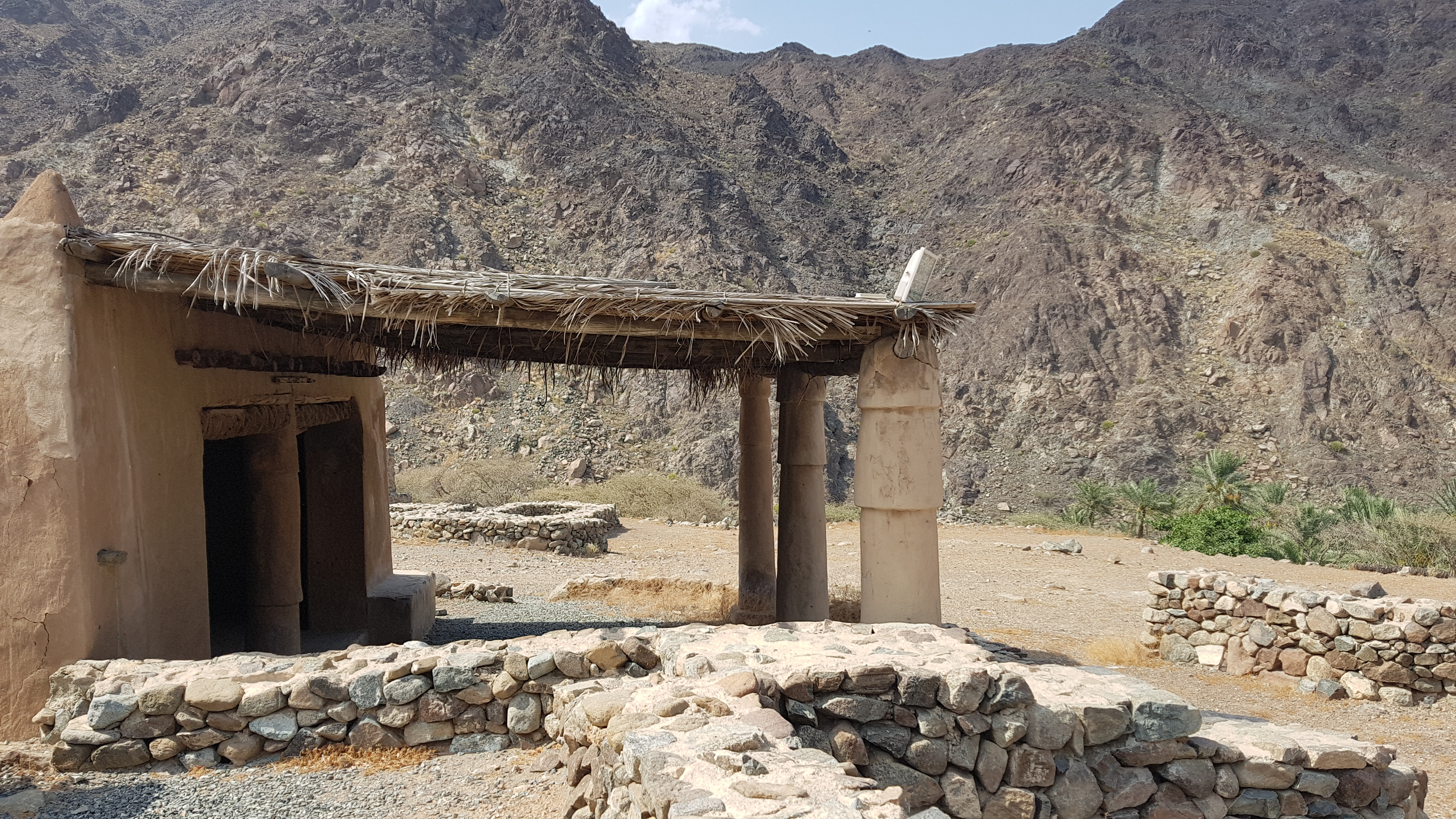
The Majlis at Al Hayl, constructed alongside the fort by Sheikh Abdullah bin Hamdan Al Sharqi in 1932.

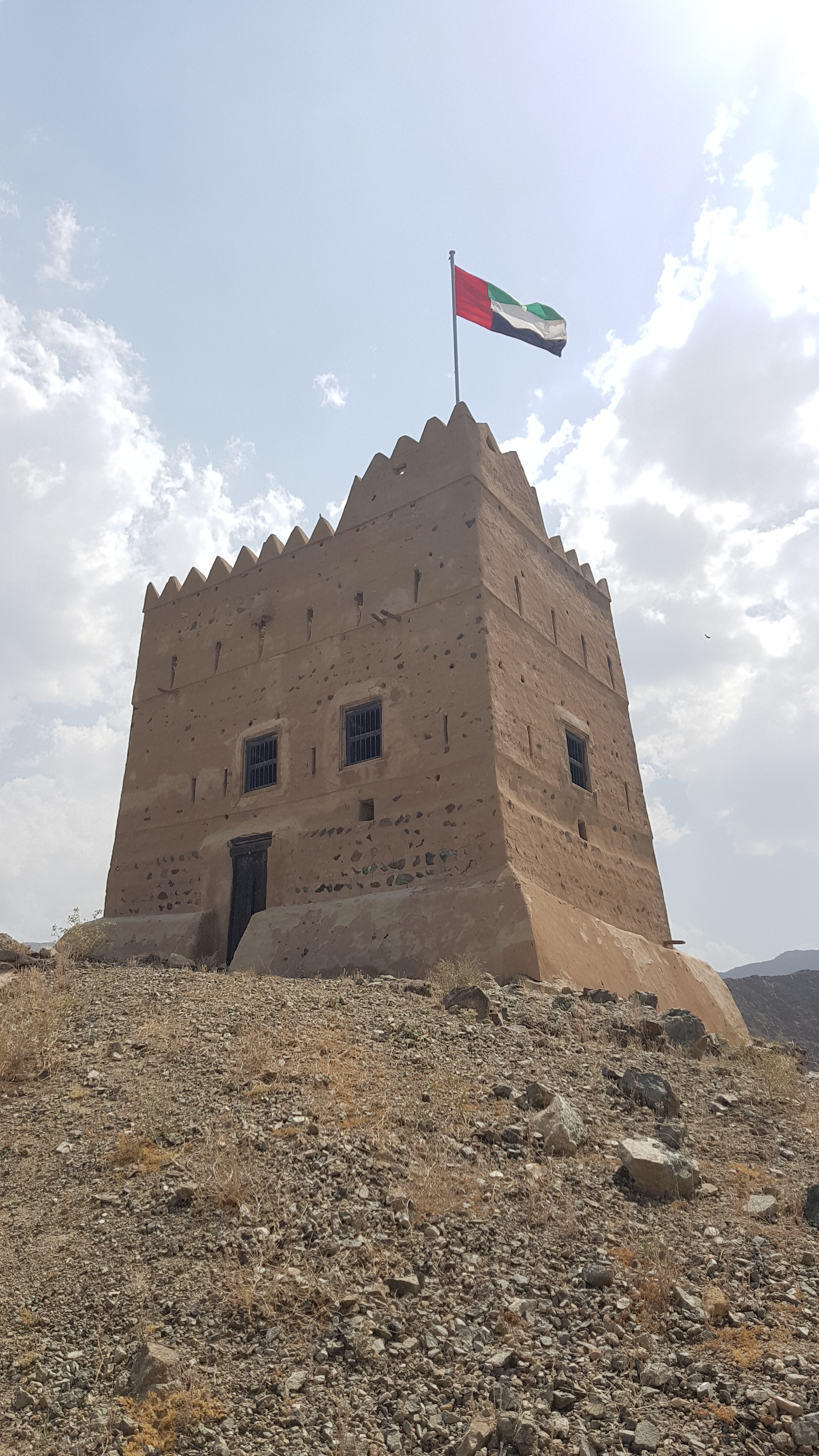
The Al Hayl Fort Watchtower, overlooking Hayl Fort and constructed at the same time as the fort. It commands views across the Wadi Hayl.

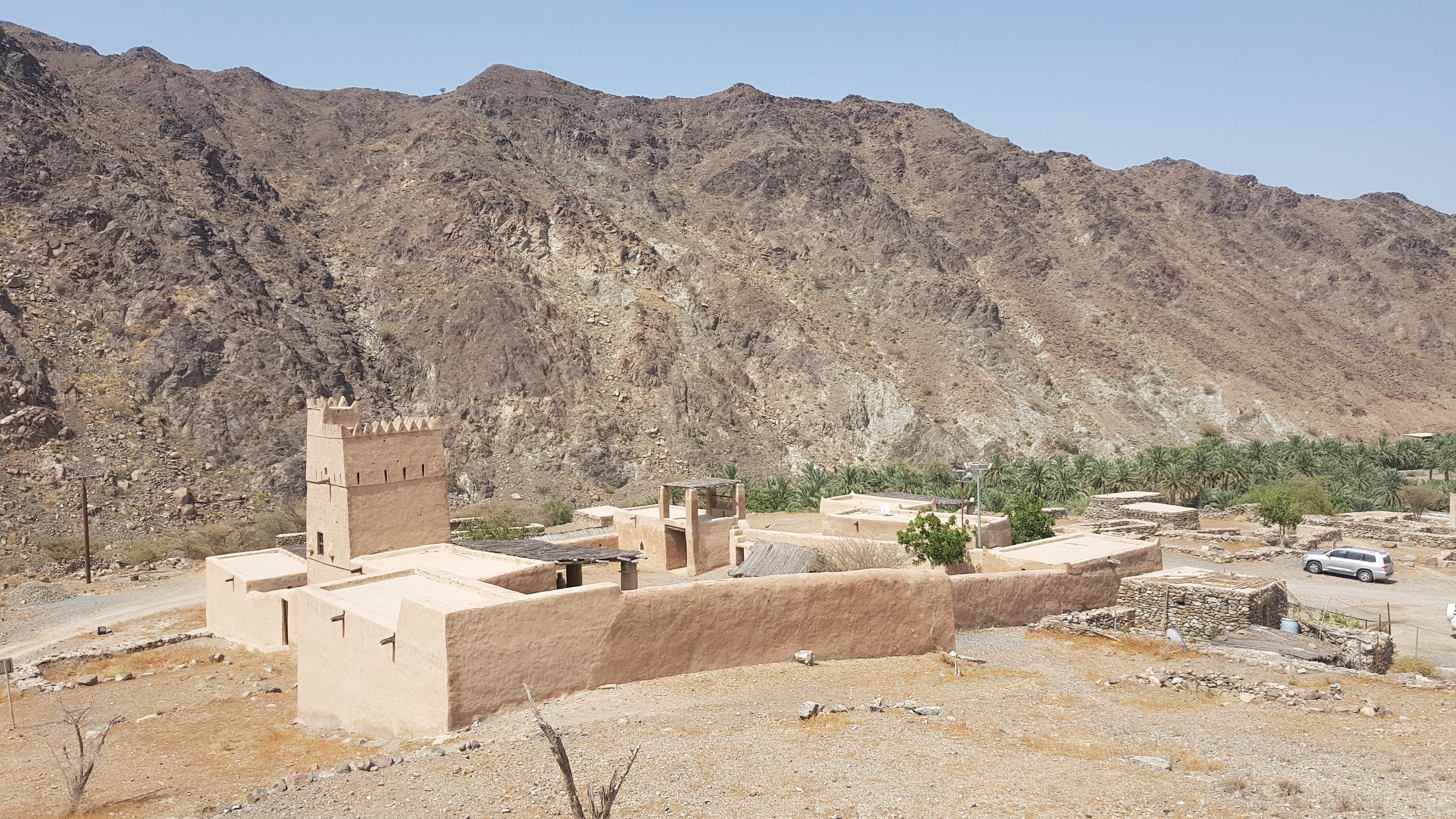
Hayl Fort
