= Hayl =

Hayl can refer to:

- Al Hayl, a settlement in Fujairah, United Arab Emirates.
- Hayl family of organ builders, 16th and 17th century German family of pipe organ builders
- HAYL Group, Information Technology Company In Egypt.
