= Kinda =

Kinda or Kindah may refer to:

== People ==
=== Given name ===
- Kinda Alloush (born 1982), Syrian actress
- Kinda El-Khatib (born 1996 or 1997), Lebanese activist
- Kinda al-Shammat (born 1973), Syrian politician

=== Surname ===
- Chris Kinda (born 1999), Namibian para-athlete
- Gadi Kinda (1994–2025), Israeli footballer
- Kinda Li (born 1991), Hong Kong activist and politician

== Politics and society ==
- Kinda (tribe), an ancient and medieval Arab tribe
- Kingdom of Kinda, a tribal kingdom in north and central Arabia in c. 450–c. 550

== Places ==
- Kinđa, Serbia
- Kinda, Idlib, Syria
- Kinda Municipality, Sweden

== Other uses ==
- In English, alternative form of kind of
- Kinda (crater), an impact crater on Mars
- Kinda (Doctor Who), a 1982 serial from the television programme Doctor Who
- Kinda baboon, a species of baboon located near Kinda, Congo
- King Kinda Jolly, Oz character
- King Kinda Jolly of Kimbaloo, Oz character
- SomeKindaWonderful, American rock band

== See also ==
- Kind (disambiguation)
- Kindai (disambiguation)
- Kinnda (born 1983), Swedish artist and songwriter
