= Al Hayl =

- Location within United Arab Emirates
- Coordinates: 25.103619°N 56.287247°E
- Country: United Arab Emirates
- Emirate: Fujairah

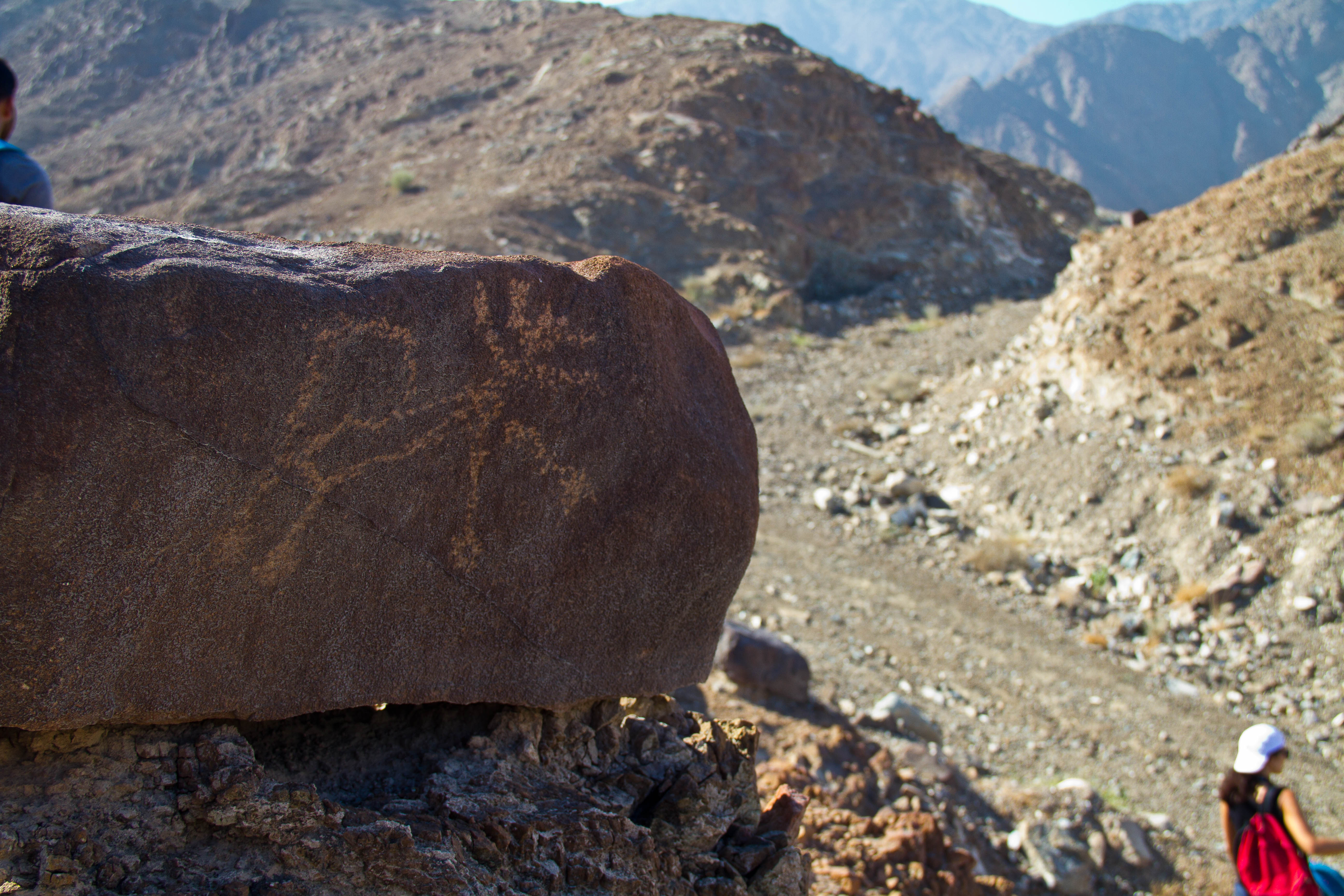
Petroglyph site at Wadi Hayl

Al Hayl is a suburb of Fujairah, United Arab Emirates (UAE), at the mouth of the Wadi Hayl. The old village in the Wadi Hayl is traditionally the home of the Kunud (singular Al Kindi) tribe.

Hayl is the site of a Dhs1.7 billion construction project, Mohammed bin Zayed City, which is planned to comprise 1,100 houses and apartments, as well as offering community services.

Al Hayl Fort, a hilltop fortification that has been dated to 1932, stands over the restored old village of Hayl. The wadi also contains a collection of petroglyphs, thought to date back to the Iron Age. Over 100 examples of rock art have been documented but a number are under threat because of the expansion of quarries as well as industrial sites and residential areas.

The Kunud are thought to be descendants of Aswad Al Kindi, who moved to the area of Oman from Yemen in the time of Muhammad.
