= Wadi Saham =

- Location within United Arab Emirates
- Coordinates: 25.112808°N 56.208962°E
- Country: United Arab Emirates
- Emirate: Fujairah

Wadi Saham is a seasonal watercourse in the Hajar Mountains of Fujairah, in the United Arab Emirates. It is notable for its petroglyphs, including a single rock bearing 26 petroglyphs across four faces.

== Petroglyphs and other finds ==
The Wadi Saham is located to the West of Fujairah City and consists mainly of a rocky wadi floor with scree and mountain walls. The largest petroglyph assemblage in the wadi is focused on a single rock, to the side of the road, with a large number of horse riders depicted, as well as geometric shapes such as the letter I and cruciform images. The petroglyphs have to a large extent been preserved by a natural bacterial deposit, known as desert varnish. Similar petroglyphs have also been found in the nearby sites of Wadi Hayl, Hassat Al Risoom (literally 'Rock with Drawings') close to the village of Roweida, and Wadi Al Shanah. They have been dated to between 1300 and 300 BCE. Some dates for the petroglyphs have been advanced as early as the Bronze Age.

A number of circular tombs were found in the wadi during surveys by the Swiss Liechtenstein Foundation, as well as scattered remains of dwellings from the Islamic period. The ruins of a Late Islamic fort stand at the head of the wadi.

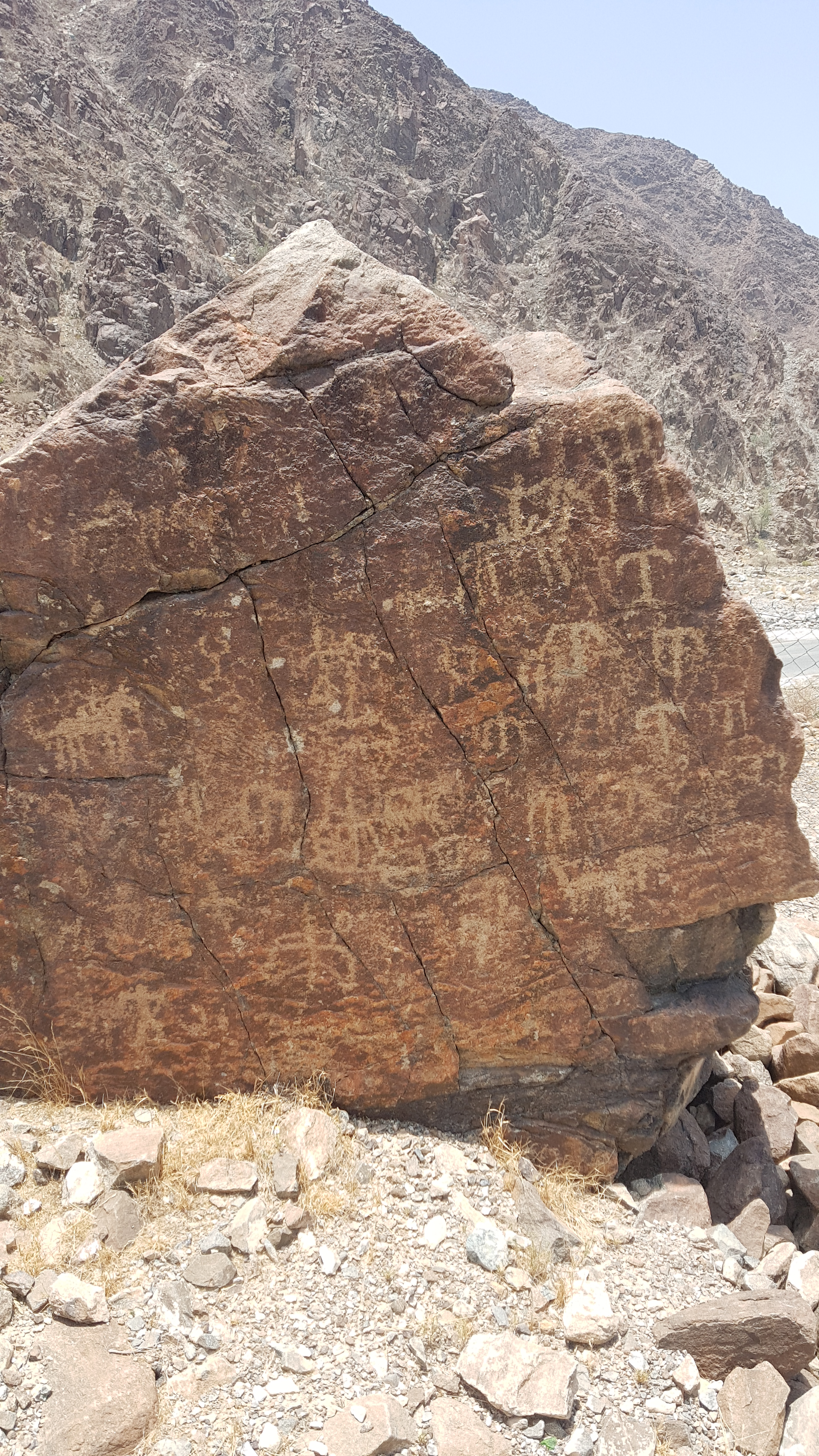
The major petroglyph assemblage at Wadi Saham, Fujairah is decorated on four sides.

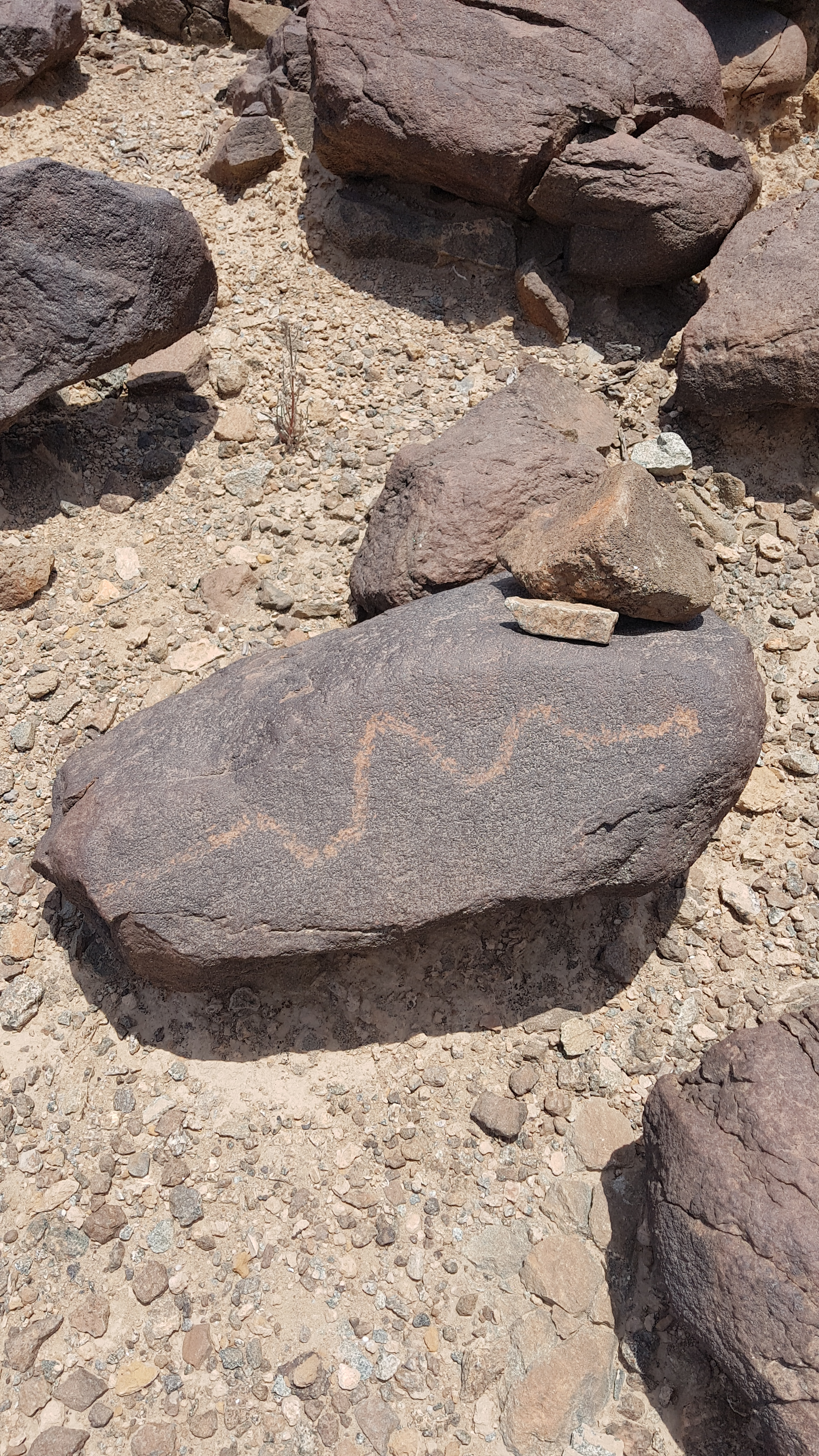
Snake motif on petroglyph. Snake motifs are a common characteristic of Iron Age decorations in the United Arab Emirates.

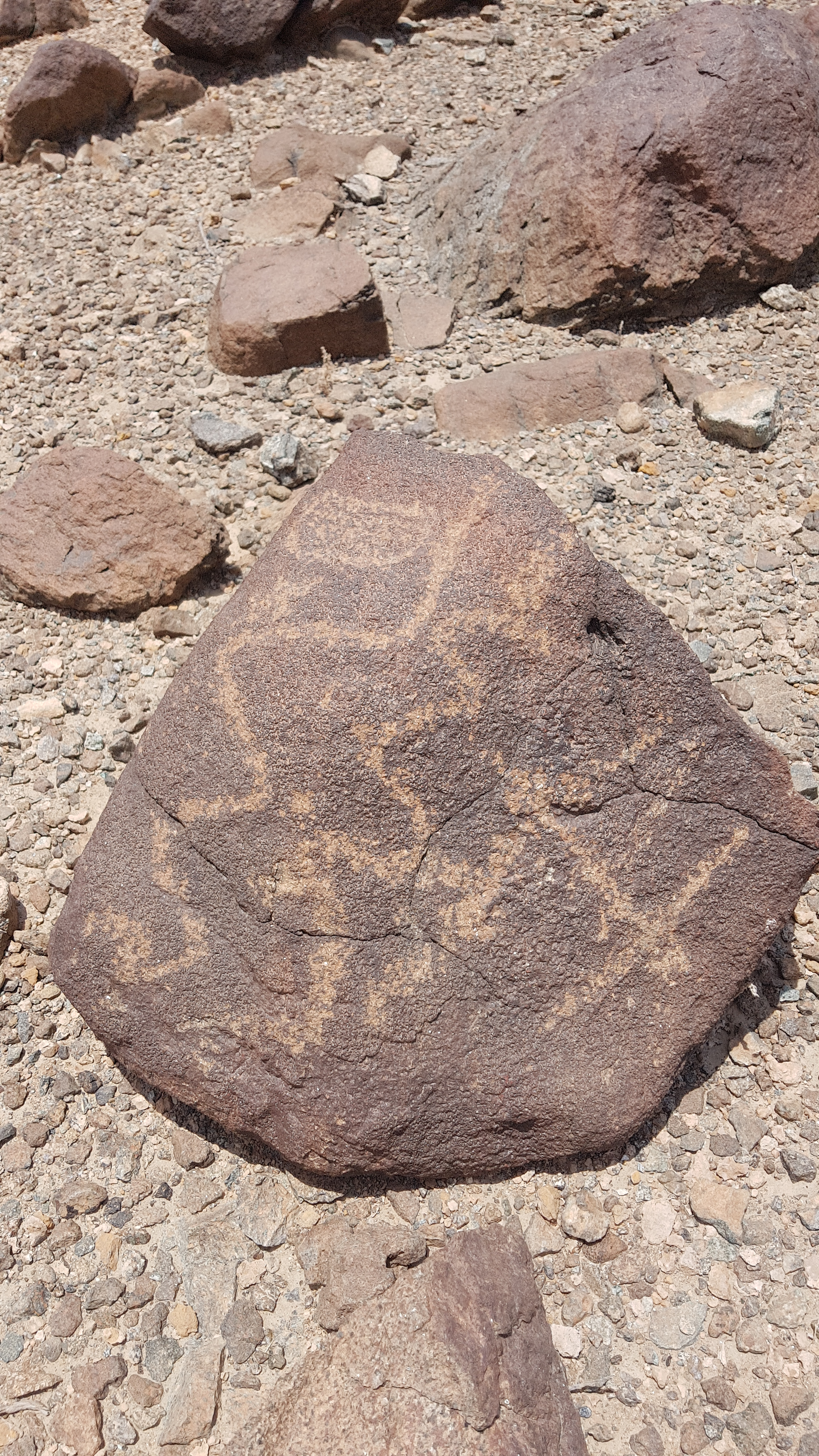
Scattered rock petroglyphs dot the Wadi Saham, Fujairah

== See also ==
- List of wadis of the United Arab Emirates
