= Al-Kindi (surname) =

Al-Kindi (Arabic: الكندي) indicates affiliation with the Arabian Kinda tribe. Yemen is the country where the surname is most commonly found.

People with the surname include:

- Hujr ibn 'Adi al-Kindi, a companion of the Islamic prophet Muhammad and Ali.
- Ya'qub ibn Ishaq al-Kindi, known as "the Philosopher of the Arabs", was a Muslim scientist, philosopher, mathematician, physician, and musician.
- Miqdad ibn al-Aswad al-Kindi, a companion of the Islamic prophet Muhammad.
- Raja Ibn Haywah al-Kindi: Islamic jurist and Arabic calligraphist.
- Zaynab bint ʿUmar b. al-Kindī, woman hadith scholar, teacher of Al-Dhahabi.
- Abd al-Masih ibn Ishaq al-Kindi, Christian theologian.
- Muhammad ibn Yusuf al-Kindi, Egyptian historian.
- Alkindi (fencer), an Indonesian Olympic fencer.

== See also ==
- Kindi (disambiguation)
- Kunud
