= Guindy (disambiguation) =

Guindy is a locality of Chennai, Tamil Nadu, India located in its north-west part.

Guindy may also refer to these places related to it:

- Guindy division, a revenue division of Chennai district
- Guindy taluk, a subdistrict of Chennai district
- Guindy metro station, Chennai Metro
- Guindy railway station
- Guindy Engineering College
- Guindy National Park, a national park containing a lake
- Guindy Links, is one of the three 18-hole golf courses in Chennai
- Kindi (vessel), a spouted waterpot used in Hindu rituals

== See also ==
- Kindi (disambiguation)
