= Desert varnish =

Orange-to-black rock coating in arid environments

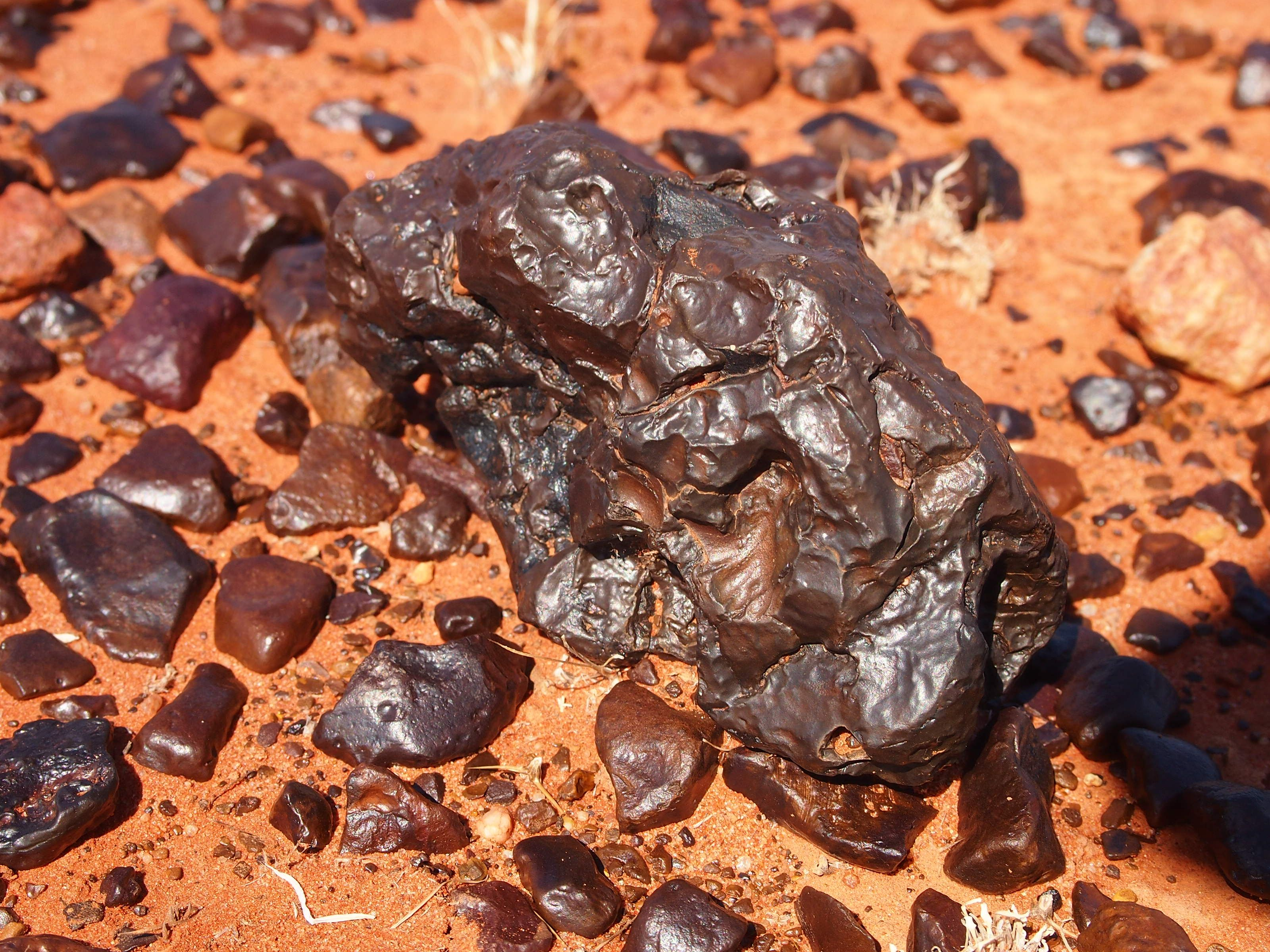
Desert varnish on gibber, Central Australia

Desert varnish or rock varnish is an orange-yellow to black coating found on exposed rock surfaces in arid environments. Desert varnish is approximately one micrometer thick and exhibits nanometer-scale layering. Rock rust and desert patina are other terms which are also used for the condition, but less often.

== Formation ==
Desert varnish forms only on physically stable rock surfaces that are no longer subject to frequent precipitation, fracturing or wind abrasion. The varnish is primarily composed of particles of clay along with oxides of iron and manganese. There is also a host of trace elements and almost always some organic matter. The color of the varnish varies from shades of brown to black.

It has been suggested that desert varnish should be investigated as a potential candidate for a "shadow biosphere". However, a 2008 microscopy study posited that desert varnish has already been reproduced with chemistry not involving life in the lab, and that the main component is actually silica and not clay as previously thought. The study notes that desert varnish is an excellent fossilizer for microbes and an indicator of water. Desert varnish appears to have been observed by rovers on Mars, and if examined may contain fossilized life from Mars's wet period.

== Composition ==
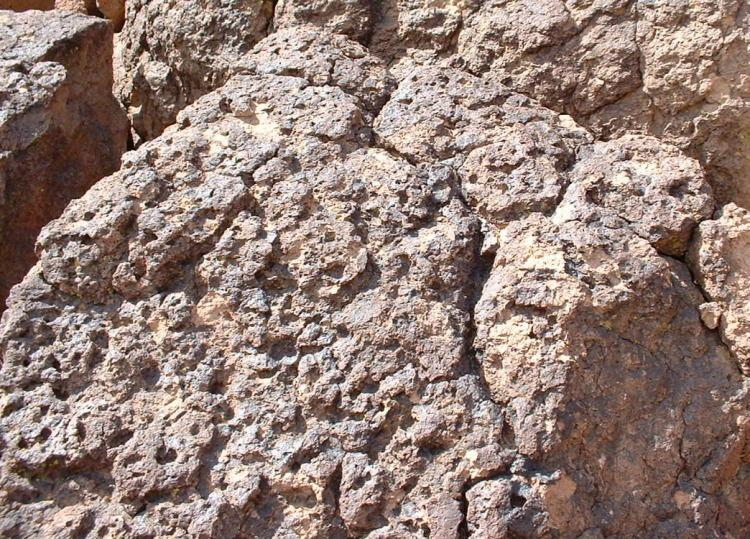
Desert varnish on Bishop Tuff.

Originally scientists thought that the varnish was made from substances drawn out of the rocks it coats. Microscopic and microchemical observations, however, show that a major part of varnish is clay, which could only arrive by wind. Clay, then, acts as a substrate to catch additional substances that chemically react together when the rock reaches high temperatures in the desert sun. Wetting by dew is also important in the process.

An important characteristic of black desert varnish is that it has an unusually high concentration of manganese. Manganese is relatively rare in the Earth's crust, making up only 0.12% of its weight. In black desert varnish, however, manganese is 50 to 60 times more abundant. One proposal for a mechanism of desert varnish formation is that it is caused by manganese-oxidizing microbes (mixotrophs) which are common in environments poor in organic nutrients. A micro-environment pH above 7.5 is inhospitable for manganese-concentrating microbes. In such conditions, orange varnishes develop, poor in manganese (Mn) but rich in iron (Fe). An alternative hypothesis for Mn/Fe fluctuation has been proposed that considers Mn-rich and Fe-rich varnishes to be related to humid and arid climates, respectively.

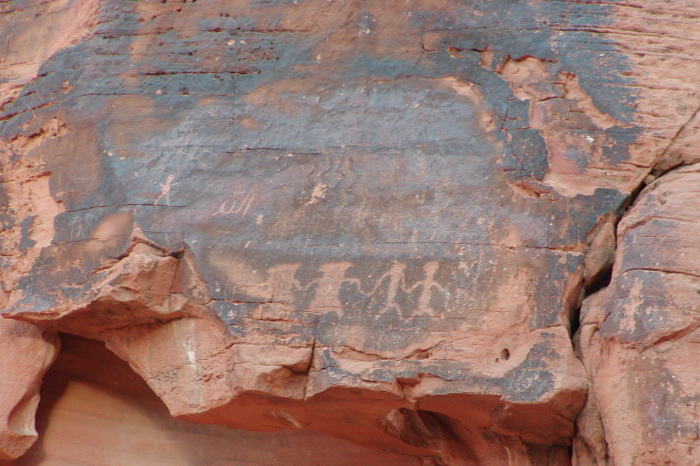
Petroglyphs carved in desert varnish at the Valley of Fire near Las Vegas, Nevada. Area shown is about one metre across.

Even though it contains high concentrations of iron and manganese, there are no significant modern uses of desert varnish. However, some Native American peoples created petroglyphs by scraping or chipping away the dark varnish to expose the lighter rock beneath.

Desert varnish often obscures the identity of the underlying rock, and different rocks have varying abilities to accept and retain varnish. Limestones, for example, typically do not have varnish because they are too water-soluble and therefore do not provide a stable surface for varnish to form. Shiny, dense and black varnishes form on basalt, fine quartzites and metamorphosed shales due to these rocks' relatively high resistance to weathering.

Its presence has been cited as a key factor in the preservation of a large number of petroglyphs dating back to the Iron Age and earlier in areas such as the Wadi Saham in the United Arab Emirates.

== See also ==
- Aeolian processes – Processes due to wind activity
- Desert pavement – Type of desert earth surface
- Manganite – Mineral composed of manganese oxide-hydroxide, MnO(OH)
- Shadow biosphere – Hypothetical biosphere of Earth

== Gallery ==
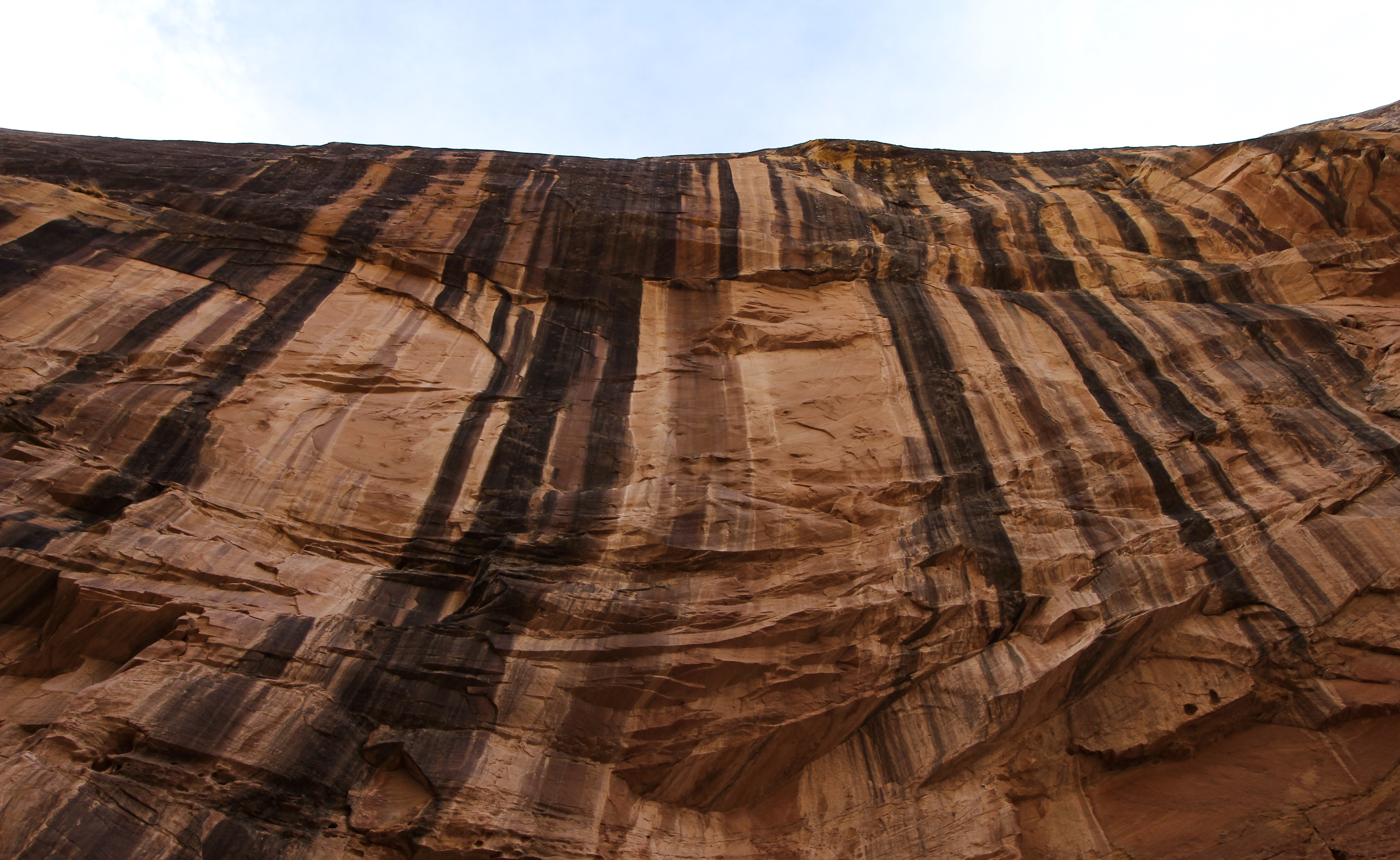
Desert varnish at Capitol Reef National Park

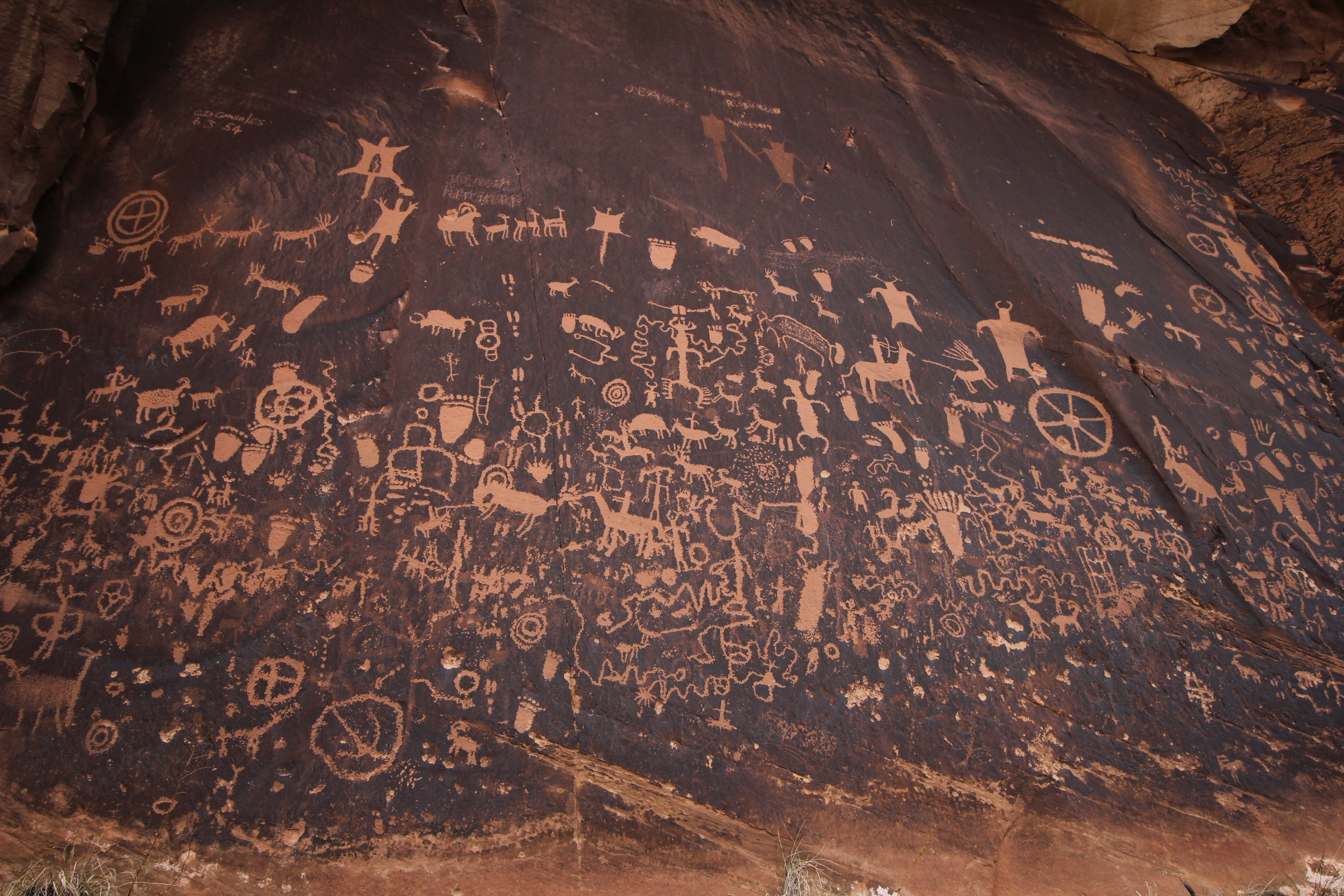
Petroglyphs at Newspaper Rock State Historic Monument carved into desert varnish

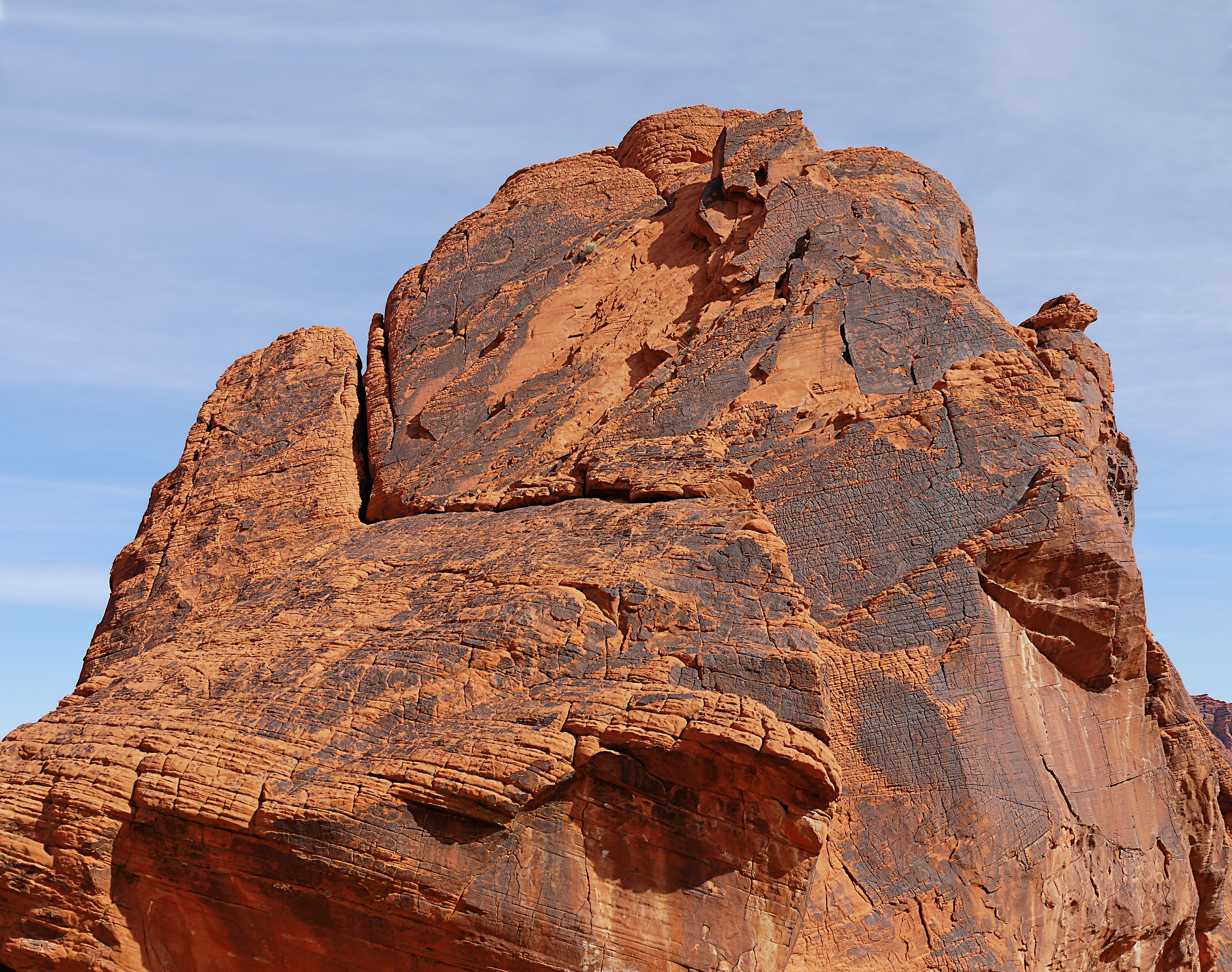
Desert varnish at Valley of Fire State Park
