= Wadi Hayl =

- Location within United Arab Emirates
- Coordinates: 25.103619°N 56.287247°E
- Country: United Arab Emirates
- Emirate: Fujairah

Wadi Hayl is a seasonal watercourse in the Hajar Mountains of Fujairah, in the United Arab Emirates. The wadi runs from the Fujairah industrial suburb of Al Hayl through the old (now restored) village of Hayl and Hayl Fort, to reach the Wadi Helo.

== Extent ==
The Fujairah end of the Wadi Hayl is home to the Mohammed bin Zayed City, a planned settlement intended to comprise 1,100 houses and apartments, as well as offering services. The wadi extends Westward from Fujairah and into the mountains, eventually meeting the Wadi Helo and Wadi Al Saifiyah, which itself leads to the Wadi Saham, notable for its extensive petroglyphs, and the Wadi Miduk.

The Wadi Hayl is dammed above the new village of Hayl, which was built to rehouse the residents of the old village of Hayl. An Umm Al Nar tomb was found at Hayl, as well as a number of Iron Age petroglyphs dotting stones throughout the course of the wadi. Traditionally a Kunud village, Hayl – and the nearby Sharjah village of Al Helo – subsisted on agriculture, particularly tobacco, which provided a lucrative crop for the villagers. Before the construction of the metalled road from Fujairah, the journey from Hayl to the city would take three hours by donkey.

Built in 1932 by Sheikh Abdullah bin Hamdan Al Sharqi, the Fort at Hayl was constructed in 1932, along with a majlis and mosque. Often incorrectly referred to as a summer house, the Fort was in fact the principal residence for Sheikh Abdullah for over two decades.

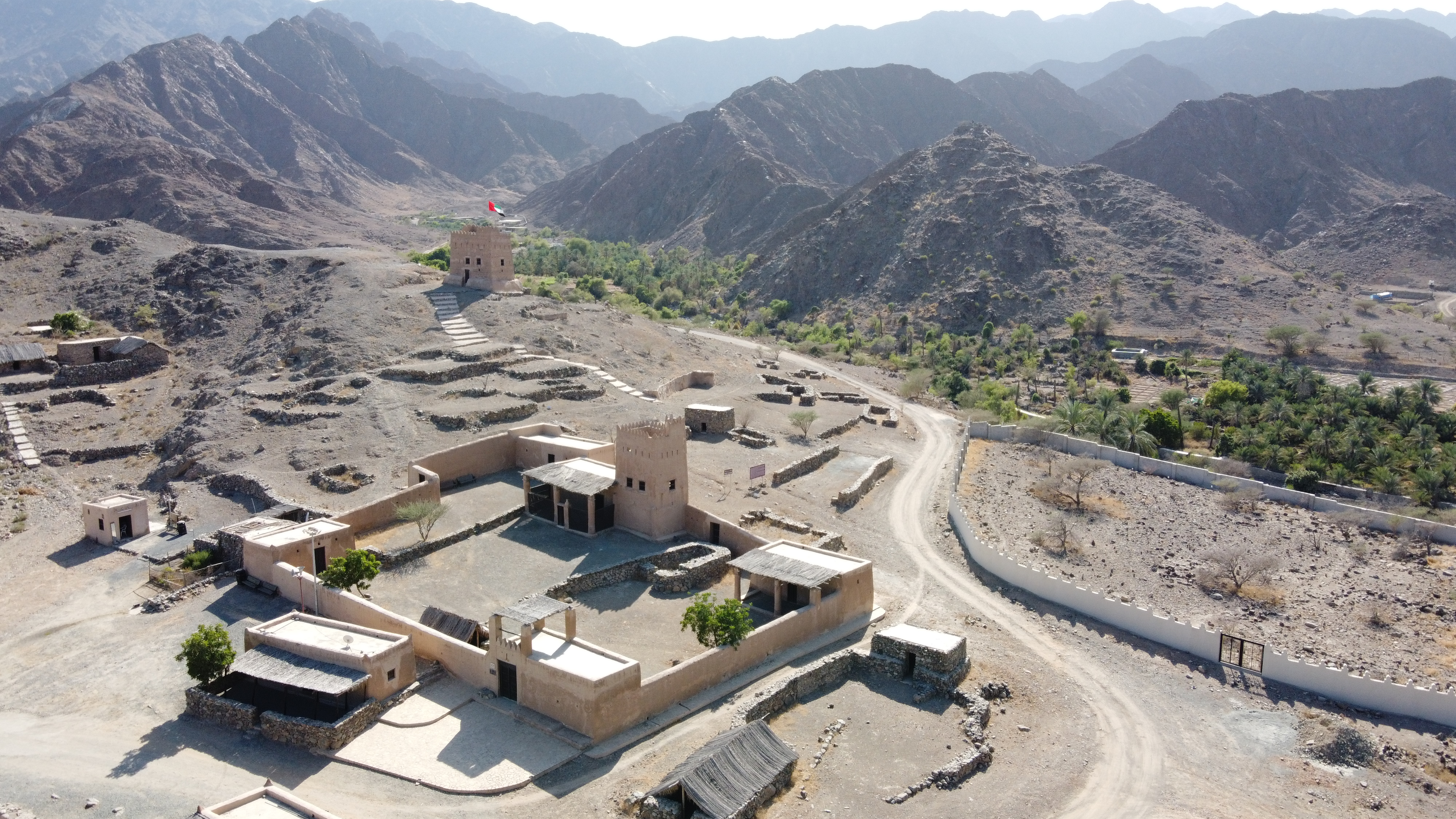
Hayl Fort and Watchtower, looking Northwest up Wadi Hayl

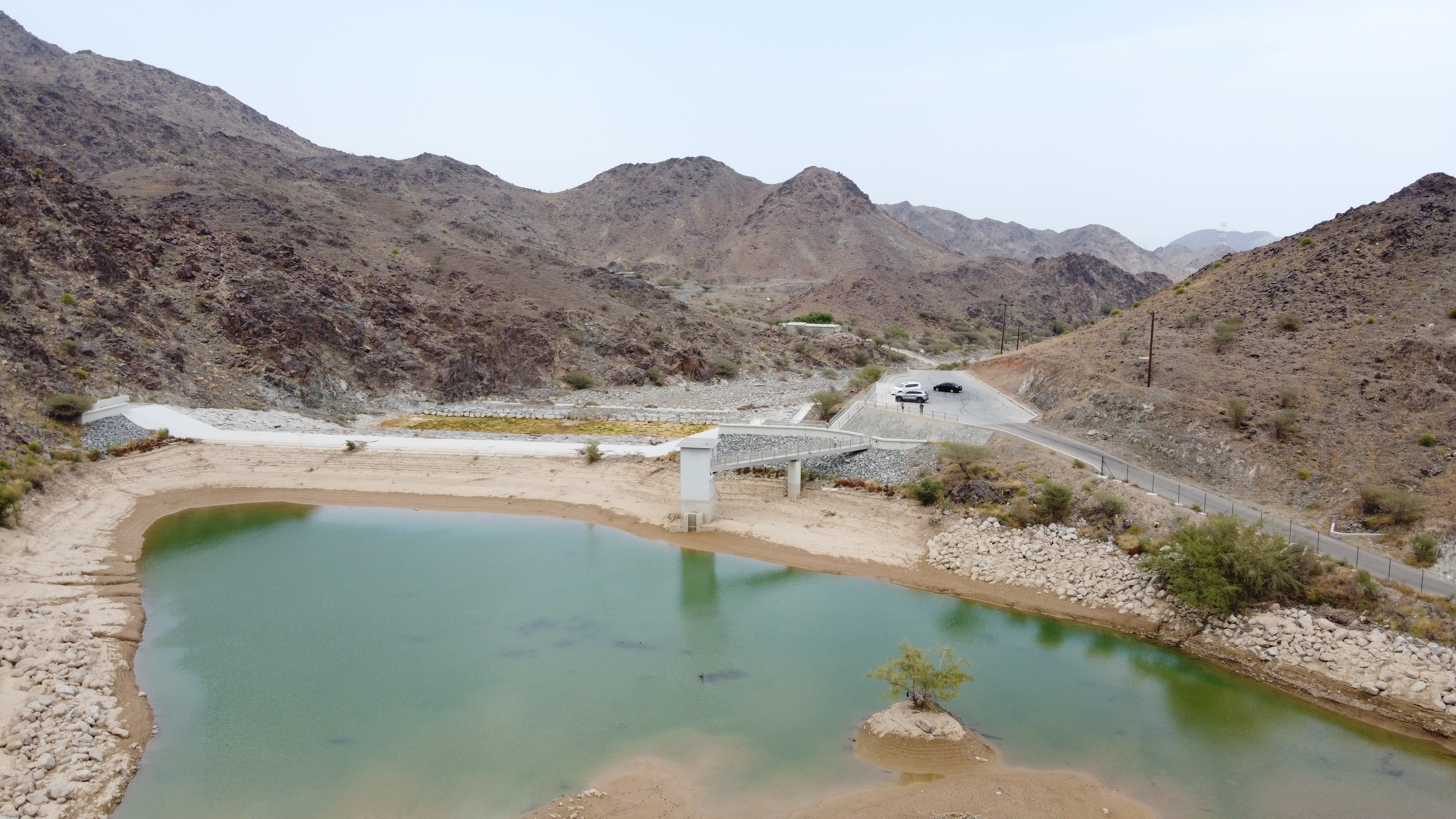
The dam in the Wadi Hayl above the new village of Hayl

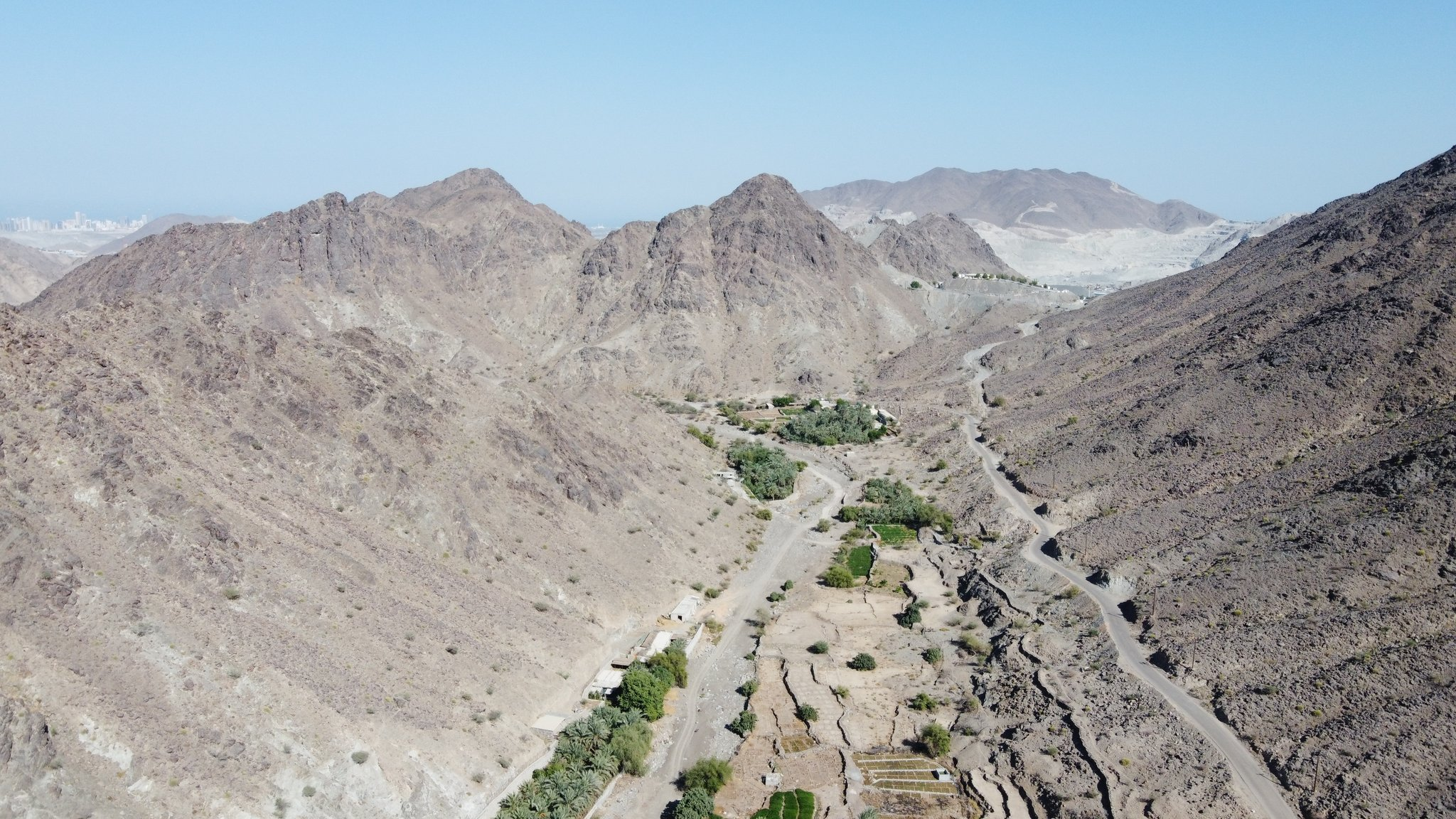
The Wadi Hayl, facing Eastwards towards Fujairah

== See also ==
- List of wadis of the United Arab Emirates
