= Kindai =

Kindai may refer to:

- Kindai, Tanzania, an administrative ward
- Kindai High School, Higashiosaka, Osaka, Japan
- Kindai University, Osaka, Japan
- Kanazawa University, called Kindai as an abbreviation, Kanazawa, Japan

== See also ==
- Kinda (disambiguation)
- Kindi (disambiguation)
