= Kinda, Idlib =

Kinda, Idlib الكندة
- Village
- Location in Syria
- Country: Syria
- Governorate: Idlib
- District: Jisr al-Shughur District
- Subdistrict: Bidama Nahiyah

Population (2004)
  - Total: 1,338
- Time zone: UTC+2 (EET)
  - Summer (DST): UTC+3 (EEST)
- City Qrya Pcode: C4230

Kinda, Idlib (Arabic: الكندة) is a Syrian village located in Bidama Nahiyah in Jisr al-Shughur District, Idlib. According to the Syria Central Bureau of Statistics (CBS), Kinda, Idlib had a population of 1,338 in the 2004 census.

As of 22 February 2025, the village is deserted, with all of its residents having been displaced during the Syrian Civil War.
