= Salma Al Kindi =

Chemist and professor from Oman

Salma bint Mohammed al Kindi is an Omani chemist. She is professor of Analytical Chemistry and dean of the College of Sciences at the Sultan Qaboos University (SQU).

In 2017 she received a Lifetime Achievement in Chemistry Award from the Venus International Foundation based in Chennai.
