= Kunud =

Bedouin tribe of the United Arab Emirates and Oman

- Arab tribe
- Ethnicity: Arab
- Location: United Arab Emirates (Fujairah, Sharjah, Dubai, Abu Dhabi); Oman
- Language: Arabic
- Religion: Islam
- Surnames: Al-Kindi

The Kunud (singular Al Kindi) is a tribe of the United Arab Emirates (UAE) and Oman.

The Kunud trace their origin to the Kinda tribal confederation that fought with the Sasanian's Lakhmid clients in the late Pre-Islamic Recent (PIR).

By the turn of the 20th century, the Kunud, a population of some 1,500, were mostly settled on the East Coast, from Nizwa in Oman to Kalba in Sharjah and Al Hayl in Fujairah, as well as Mahdah and Buraimi.

Long associated with the Sudan (Al Suwaidi), the Kunud have been linked to Miqdad ibn Aswad Al Kindi, an immigrant into Oman from Yemen at the time of the Islamic prophet, Muhammad. Traditionally, the Kunud followed the Omani Ibadi faith.

== People ==
- Nouf Al Kindi — Emirati writer and entrepreneur
- Salma Al Kindi — Omani chemist
- Marwan Al Kindi — Emirati entrepreneur
