= Dhawahir =

Bedouin tribe of the United Arab Emirates and Oman

Dhawahir ظَوَاهِر (in Arabic)
- Arab tribe
- Ethnicity: Arab
- Location: United Arab Emirates
- Branches: Daramikah
- Language: Arabic
- Religion: Sunni Islam

The Dhawahir (Arabic: ظَوَاهِر, romanized: Ẓawāhir; singular Al Dhahiri (Arabic: ٱلظَّاهِرِي, romanized: Aẓ-Ẓāhirī)) is a tribe of the United Arab Emirates (UAE) and Oman. The tribe's main centre was the Buraimi Oasis and the village, then town (now city) of Al Ain. They have long had a strong alliance with the Ruling family of Abu Dhabi, the Al Nahyan, and the Bani Yas confederation.

== Early history ==
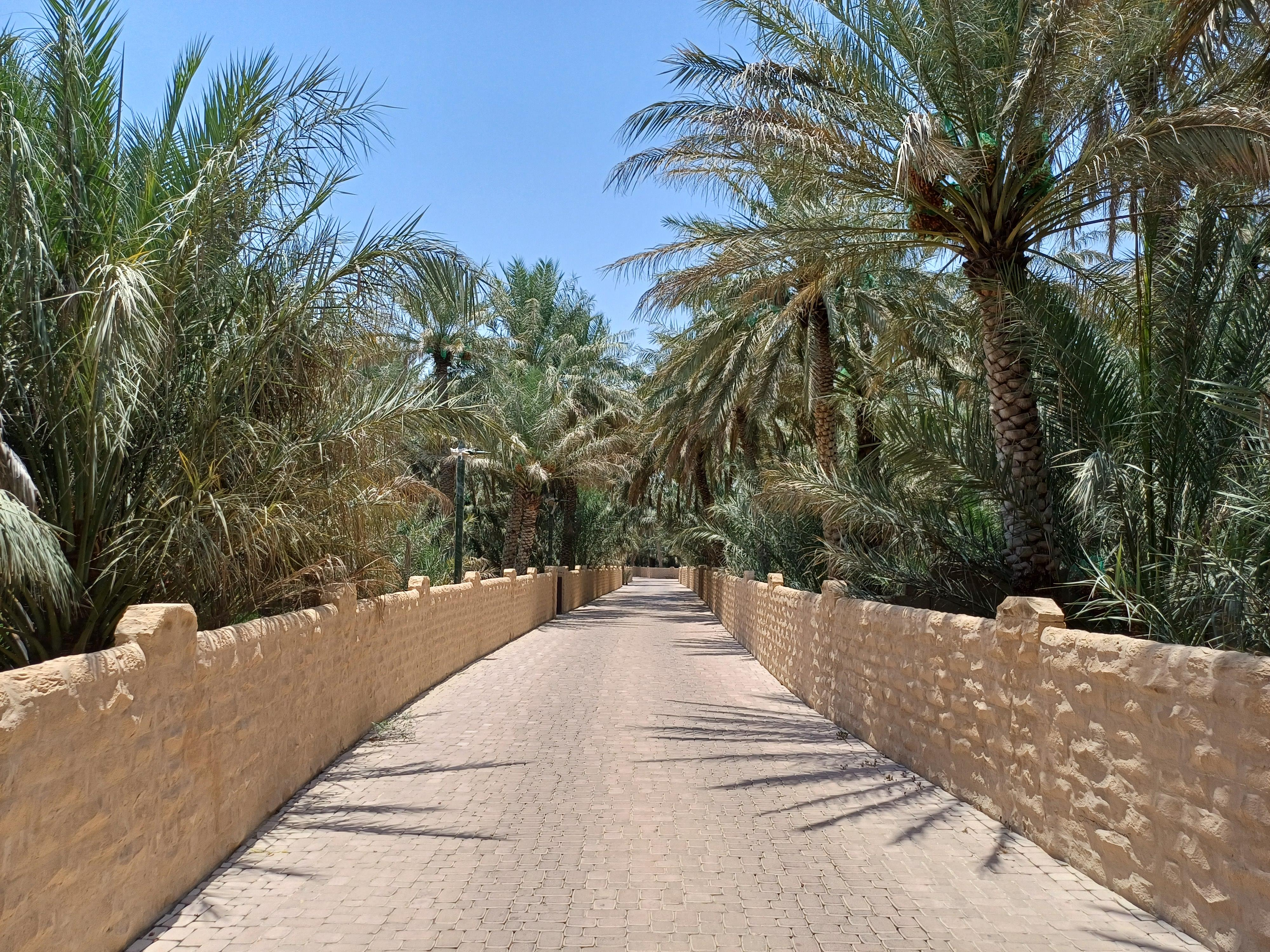
Oasis of Al Ain

The tribe's traditional area of influence is the Oasis of Al Ain, where at the turn of the 20th century, they owned much of the cultivated land and property with the exception of Buraimi village itself. Numbering 4,500, the tribe consisted of many subsections like: the Daramikah, who populated Hili, and Qattara; the Jawabir in Al Ain and the Bani Saad who lived in Jimi. Staying in the villages for the summer date season, in winter the community would move throughout the Trucial States. They kept large flocks of sheep, herded camels and traded in charcoal, which they burned. The fertile woodlands of the oasis, irrigated by a highly effective falaj system, supported this wood-burning industry.

The early history of the Dhawahir suggests they originally populated the area of Al Dhahirah, today in Oman. A later wave of settlers in Buraimi, the Na'im, have long had an uneasy relationship with the Dhawahir and the two tribes were frequently in dispute.

== Conflict with Muscat, Sharjah and Wahhabis ==
1824 Buraimi Dispute
Date	1824-1839
Location	Buraimi
Result	Sheikh Tahnun Victory Forts Destroyed Agreement Signed

Belligerents
Al Nahyan Dhawahir Tribe Al Nai'm Tribe	Muscat Sharjah Wahhabis British

Commanders and leaders
Sheikh Tahnun bin Shakhbut Al Nahyan	Sultan bin Saqr Al Qasimi

A number of interests jostled for influence over the Dhawahir and Na'im of Al Ain, including the Sultan of Muscat, the Wahhabis (who made a number of incursions into the area around Buraimi) and Sheikh Sultan bin Saqr of Sharjah, who established a number of forts in the oasis. Sheikh Tahnun bin Shakhbut Al Nahyan commanded the loyalty of many of the Bedouin families in the area ('You will be aware that Dhahirah belongs to us' he told the British in 1839) and established his primacy there when, in 1824, an agreement was forced on Sharjah in which Sheikh Sultan bin Saqr Al Qasimi recognised Tahnun's claim to Buraimi, and then demolished the forts he had built there.

The Dhawahir and Manasir in Al Ain were close and Sheikh Khalifa bin Shakbut Al Nahyan acceded to an agreement in 1840, in which he took full responsibility for the Bani Yas, Manasir and, for the first time, the Dhawahir. Khalifa enjoyed their support as fighting men as he did most of the tribes of the interior. His popularity with the tribes was also enjoyed by his son, Sheikh Saeed bin Tahnun Al Nahyan, when facing incursions by the Wahhabis. Following one such incident, Saeed moved on Buraimi, capturing his two forts back from the Wahhabis with the help of both the Dhawahir and Awamir. He then pulled together the Bani Qitab, Ghafalah, Awamir and Bani Yas in Khatam and placed the Manasir and Mazari in Dhafrah to block the relieving Wahhabi army under Sa'ad bin Mutlaq. By 1850, Saeed's great tribal association had cleared Burami Oasis of Wahhabi forces. He subsequently accepted a stipend from the Sultan of Muscat for the defence of Buraimi.

The strong and longstanding alliance between the Bani Yas and the Dhawahir was relatively unusual, with most of the tribes of the interior keen to assert their independence. The Na'im, for instance, enjoyed an often truculent relationship with the Sultan of Muscat.

== Uprising against Zayed ==
Dhawahir Uprising
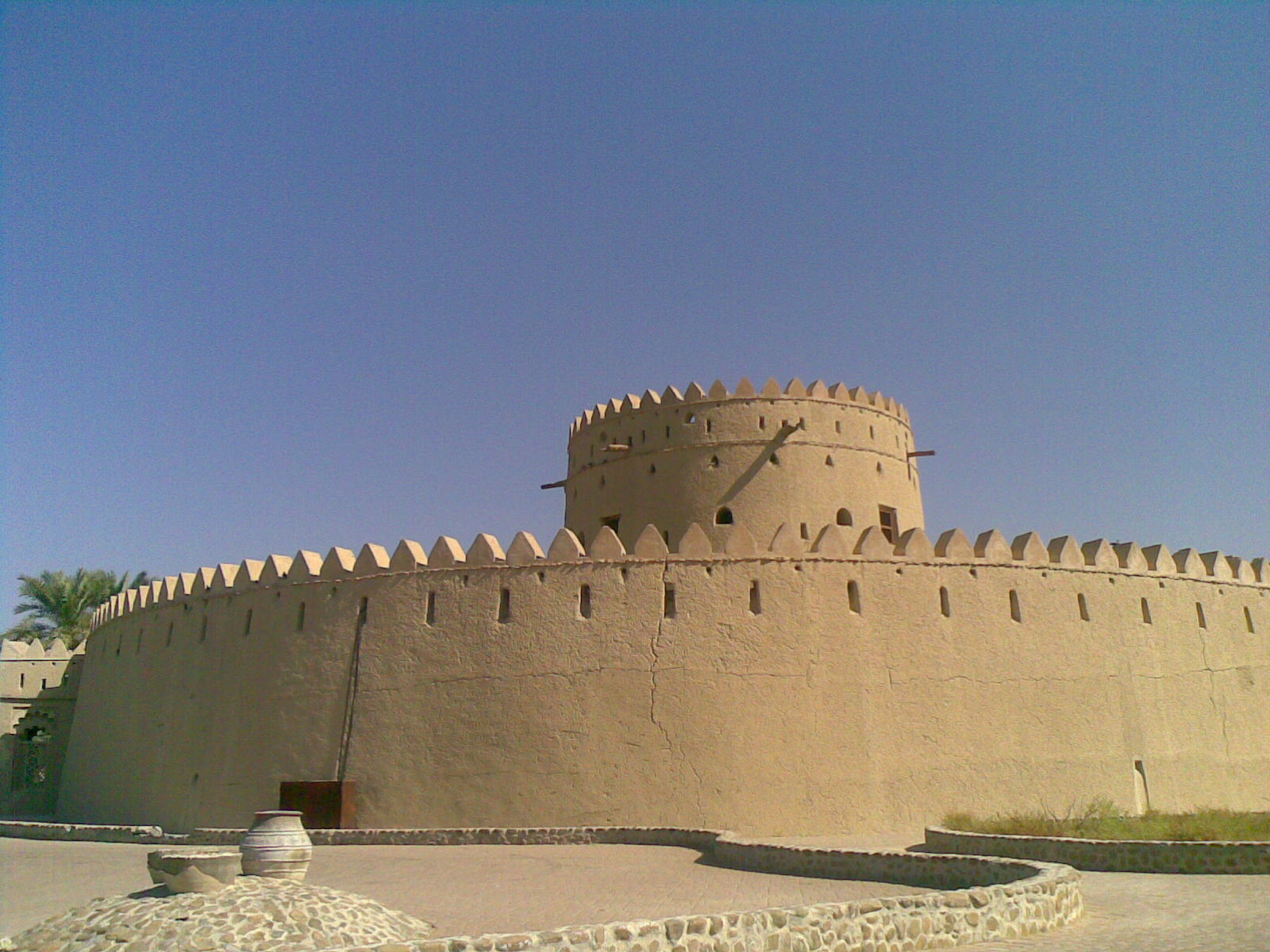
- The reconstructed round watchtower at Al Hili, a 19th-century Dhawahir fortification used to defend the oasis during their resistance against Al Nahyan expansion.
Date	1876 - 1891
Location	Al Ain
Result	Al Nahyan victory; Ahmad bin Muhammad bin Hilal Al Dhahiri appointed as new headman; Dhawahir sheikhs taken hostage; Dhawahir victory; Dhawahir rebel

Belligerents
Dhawahir tribe Al Nuaimi tribe (until 1877)	Al Nahyan tribe Bani Yas Coalition (20 tribes) Emirate of Dubai (since 1891)

Commanders and leaders
Dhawahir Sheikhs Na'im headman of Buraimi	Zayed bin Khalifa Al Nahyan

Units involved
unknown	force of 30 horsemen and 300 camel riders from dubai

However, it wasn't always smooth sailing. Sheikh Zayed bin Khalifah Al Nahyan, known as 'Zayed the Great', was a strong and charismatic leader and increased his hold on Buraimi by buying date groves and water rights, predominantly from the Dhawahir. It soon became obvious that this policy was changing the pattern of ownership throughout the oasis and the Dhawahir rebelled. Determined to press ahead with his scheme, he reconciled with the Na'im and then went to war with the Dhawahir in 1877. After a month-long conflict, Zayed prevailed and took two Dhawahir Sheikhs hostage to guarantee the good behaviour of the tribe. In 1891 he once again marched on the oasis, with the support of Dubai, and a force of 30 horsemen and 300 camel riders quelled the opposition and took the Dhawahir's main settlement 'Ain Dhawahir (now simply known as 'Al Ain'). He built a fort there to underline his dominion over the oasis and established a wali, wisely appointing a member of the Dhawahir as his headman. Ahmad bin Muhammad bin Hilal Al Dhahiri lived in Jimi and was a loyal and effective representative.

The Dhawahir subsequently worked for their Bani Yas owners in cultivating the groves. As subjects of Abu Dhabi, the Dhawahir paid taxes on the date crop, as well as water fees.

== People ==
- Rashid Al Dhaheri — Emirati racing driver
- Ali Saeed Bin Harmal Al Dhaheri — Emirati businessman and former government official
- Jouan Salem Al Dhaheri — Emirati politician
- Nasser al-Dhaheri — Emirati writer and journalist
