= Kanad Hospital =

- True Sojourners

Geography
- Location: Al Ain, Emirate of Abu Dhabi, United Arab Emirates
- Coordinates: 24°12′23″N 55°45′35″E

Organisation
- Type: Specialist

Services
- Standards: Joint Commission International Accreditation
- Beds: 200
- Speciality: Maternity and Pediatric Hospital

History
- Founded: 1960

Links
- Website: Kanad Hospital, Al Ain
- Lists: Hospitals in United Arab Emirates

Kanad Hospital (formerly known as Oasis Hospital) is a private hospital for women and children in Al Ain, United Arab Emirates, that was established in 1960 by the American missionary couple Dr. Burwell (Pat) and his wife Marian Kennedy. It is the oldest hospital in Al Ain and the second oldest in the United Arab Emirates. There are currently 200 beds in the hospital.

== History ==
Inaugurated in November 1960 as Oasis Hospital, the hospital was the first institution to offer modern medical care in Al Ain and the entire emirate of Abu Dhabi. It was established by the American medical duo Pat and Marian Kennedy at the invitation of Sheikh Zayed bin Sultan Al Nahyan, who was then the Governor of Al Ain. At the time of its establishment, Al Ain had very high infant and maternal mortality rates, with as many as one in two infants and one in three women dying for want of adequate medical care. So drastic was the impact of the hospital in reducing mortality that a simple wooden fetal heart monitor was chosen in 2011 as one of the 40 objects that shaped modern UAE by the National newspaper.

The hospital initially operated out of a mud building, a guest house that was donated by Sheikh Zayed. In 1963 heavy rains damaged the first structures, and a subsequent fire destroyed eight new rooms made from aluminium and palm branches. Following this, a modest cement building housing patients' rooms and a nurses' station was constructed in 1964. It included 20 patient rooms, a nursery, and a utility room. Up until the 1970s, when it added facilities such as X-ray, a delivery suite, and staff housing, facilities at the hospital remained rudimentary. In 1985, facilities for paediatrics, surgery and obstetrics were added to the hospital. In 1990, the hospital was further expanded with a 36-bed building.

In 2009, Sheikh Khalifa bin Zayed Al Nahyan, the ruler of Abu Dhabi and President of the UAE, granted 135 million dirhams as a grant-in-aid towards expanding the facilities at the hospital. By August 2015, the hospital opened its new building, becoming a 200-bed hospital with an additional 28 NICU beds and 7 Intermediate Care Unit beds. The new facility enhanced outpatient and inpatient services by adding neonatology and maternal-fetal medicine and expanding pediatric services.

Kanad Hospital celebrated its golden jubilee in 2010. Since its founding, Kanad Hospital has contributed to reducing infant mortality rates (IMR) and maternal mortality rates (MMR) in Al Ain to under one percent. By 2019, the hospital had recorded more than 120,000 births and continued to provide accessible healthcare to the residents of Al Ain and nearby towns of Oman.

In December 2019, Crown Prince of Abu Dhabi, Sheikh Mohamed bin Zayed, ordered Oasis Hospital to be renamed Kanad Hospital (the local Arabic dialect for the name Kennedy) in honour of its missionary founders, Dr. Pat and Marian Kennedy.

In 2020, the hospital was passed to the new ownership of the True Sojourners.

Kanad Hospital signed a memorandum of understanding with Children's National Hospital in October 2024, to collaborate on paediatric diagnostics, education, and clinical knowledge exchange.

On 17 April 2026, the hospital celebrated its 65th anniversary.

== Facilities ==
Kanad Hospital is one of the UAE's top maternity and pediatric hospitals. Kanad was the first non-government hospital in the emirate of Abu Dhabi to receive the Joint Commission International Accreditation in 2007 and maintains this status until today, with a perfect score on its most recent JCI accreditation in 2023. The hospital has specialized men's, women's, and children's health centers and, as of 2024, has departments of anesthesiology, ENT, ophthalmology, general surgery, pediatrics, neurology, psychiatry, cardiology, orthopedics, urology, obstetrics, endocrinology and radiology. The hospital also includes a Level III Neonatal Intensive Care Unit (NICU).

Currently, Kanad Hospital handles over 200,000 outpatient visits annually, admits 8,000 patients, and performs nearly 4,000 deliveries per year.
