= Mohammed bin Musallam bin Ham al-Ameri =

Businessman, author and former UAE Federal National Council member

Sheikh Mohammed bin Musallam bin Ham Al-Ameri
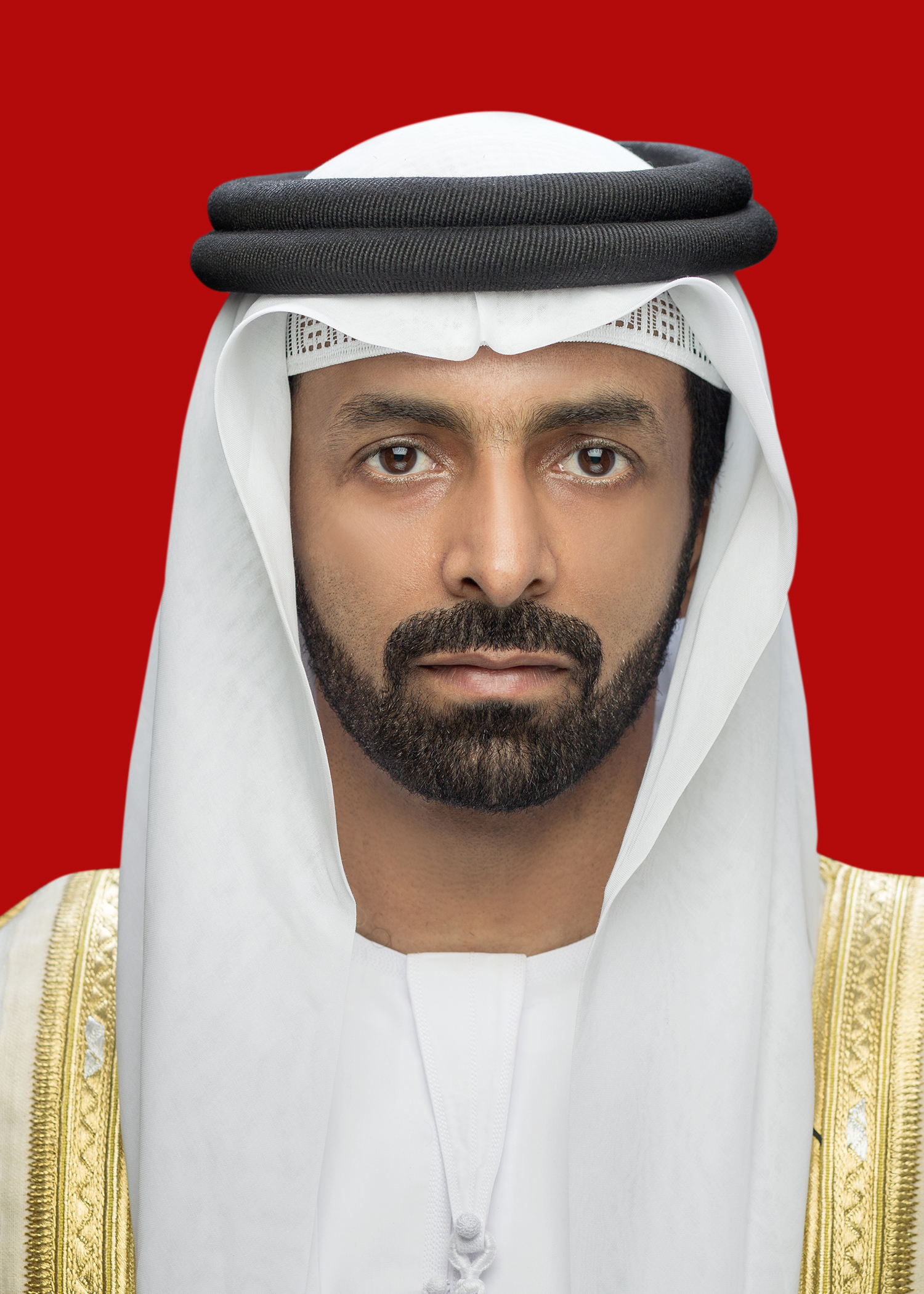
- Born: Mohammed bin Musallam bin Ham Al-Ameri; January 11, 1972 (age 54); Al Ain, UAE
- Education: Grand Canyon University; University of Kent (PhD)
- Occupations: Investor, business magnate, and author
- Years active: 2005–present
- Spouse: Married
- Children: 10
- Website: mohamedbinham.com/en

Sheikh Mohammed Bin Musallam Bin Ham Al-Ameri (born 1972) is an Emirati billionaire businessman, author and former UAE Federal National Council member. He is the Deputy Secretary-General of the Intergovernmental Institution for the use of Micro-algae Spirulina against Malnutrition (IIMSAM), Deputy Chairman of the Bin Ham Group and Member of Al Ain Municipal Council. He is the Deputy Secretary General of the United Nations Emsam Organization. He has pledged half of his wealth to charity through The Giving Pledge.

== Early life ==
Born on January 11, 1972, in Al Ain, a city of the Emirate of Abu Dhabi, descended from a family known for its interest in al Al-Ameri's father Sheikh Musallam bin Salem bin Ham Al Ameri and his grandfather, Sheikh Salem bin Ham, played formative roles in the early years of the UAE. Al-Ameri traveled to the United States to obtain a master's degree from the Grand Canyon University, and in 2008 received a doctorate degree from the University of Kent. In 2005, he was appointed Vice Chairman of Bin Ham Group, a national economic group. In 2011, he was elected to be a member of the Federal National Council. In 2012, he was chosen as one of the founding members of the Association, "We are all UAE".

== Federal National Council ==
In 2011 Al-Ameri, became an elected member of the Federal National Council.

== Giving Pledge ==
Al-Ameri joined 215 other signatories from 24 countries committed to donating at least half their wealth to charity. The Giving Pledge was launched in 2010 by Microsoft founder Bill Gates and his wife Melinda, and American business magnate Warren Buffett.

== Books ==
Al-Ameri published three books, one titled, "United Arab Emirates - Wise Governance" (2012) and the other "The Shura in the UAE," published 2015, which is an analytical representation of the Emirati experience of commitment to Shura, as an approach to governance and also a way of life since ancient times. His book United Arab Emirates: The Road to Excellence was published in 2019.

== Awards ==
He received the Mohammad Bin Rashid Medal for Scientific Excellence 2008 and 2011, Mahatma Gandhi Medallion Humanity Award and the Sheikh Khalifa Bin Ali Al Khalifa Award for Charity. He was selected as the best Arab cultural figure for 2019 by the Union of Arab creators and Arab media and the representative of the League of Arab States.
