= Al Nahyaneia Model School =

Government school in United Arab Emirates

Coordinates: 24°13′4.82″N 55°45′23.78″E

Al Nahyaneia Model School (also Al Nahyaneya Model School) is one of the first government-run schools built in the United Arab Emirates and the first in the city of Al Ain. It was established by Sheikh Zayed Bin Sultan Al Nahyan in 1959.

== History ==
Until the late 1950s, education generally took place at al-Katateeb. Under Sheikh Zayed Bin Sultan Al Nahyan, the decision was made to modernize the education system in the U.A.E., and in 1959, it was the first formal school founded in Al Ain.

== Departments ==
Al Nahyaneia Model School has approximately 650 students and 70 teachers. The students are Emirati boys. Core subjects offered are: Arabic, Islamic Studies, Social Studies, English, Math and Science. Non-core subjects include: Art, Music, Physical Education/Health Studies and Information Technology. The school has a library, student cafeteria, gymnasium, computer labs, music rooms, science labs and art rooms. There is a special education room and the school clinic has a full-time nurse.
