= Zayed Central Library =

National Library in Al Ain, United Arab Emirates

Zayed Central Library مكتبة زايد المركزية
- Zayed Central Library, 2022
- 24°14′0″N 55°45′13″E
- Location: Mohammed Bin Khalifa St, Al Mutawaa, Al Ain, United Arab Emirates
- Type: Academic library (1977–2016); Public Library (2016 – present)
- Established: 1977

Other information
- Director: Jumua al-Dhaheri
- Website: Zayed Central Library

Zayed Central Library (ZCL) (Arabic: مكتبة زايد المركزية) is a Public library in Al Ain, United Arab Emirates. Established in 1977 as one of the academic libraries of the United Arab Emirates University (UAEU), it was opened to the general public in 2016 and hosts a collection of more than 100,000 books for readers of all age groups, making it the largest public library in the city. It is overseen by the Abu Dhabi Department of Culture and Tourism.

== Overview ==
Clock tower and building of Zayed Central Library, 2022

Zayed Central Library was established in 1977 during the reign of Sheikh Zayed as an academic library of the United Arab Emirates University in Al Ain following the latter's inauguration in 1976. Just like other academic libraries, Zayed Central Library adopted the Dewey Decimal Classification system whereas the cataloging work and the public service was done manually.

The university moved to modernize the library in the 1990s by making it University Libraries Deanship and introducing automated integrated systems to fulfill research requirements and converting its holdings into a bilingual database, both in Arabic and English.

By 2002, the library completed the re-classification of all of its material and resources in accordance with the American Library of Congress. In 2015, the Abu Dhabi Department of Culture and Tourism announced the transformation of the library into a public one by 2016 when President Sheikh Khalifa's declared 2016 as the Year of Reading.

Following the outbreak of the COVID-19 pandemic in the country, the Abu Dhabi Department of Culture and Tourism closed down all public libraries in March 2020, including Zayed Central Library and was only reopened at thirty-percent capacity in November 2020.

In 2021, following the lifting of COVID-19 restrictions in the city, the university hosted the Al Ain Book Fare for nine days between September 21 and 30.
