= Daramikah =

Bedouin tribe of the United Arab Emirates and Oman

The Daramikah (Arabic: درامكة, singular Darmaki) are an Arabian tribe, a branch of the widespread Dhawahir of the United Arab Emirates (UAE) and Oman. They have given their name to a small watchtower located in the Qattara Oasis in Al Ain, one of a number of areas in the region traditionally held by the semi-nomadic Dhawahir. The tower protected the falaj irrigation system that gave life to the oasis.

In the latter part of the 19th century, the Al bu Falah of Abu Dhabi bought out much of the property previously owned by the Dhawahir, who continued to cultivate the land in Al Ain, Jimi, Hilli, Qattarah and Mu'tirid.

== See also ==
- Tribes of Arabia
