= Al Ain English Speaking School =

Coordinates: 24.192749°N 55.701928°E

Al Ain English School
- Al Ain; United Arab Emirates

Information
- Motto: Achieving Excellence
- Religious affiliations: Non-Secular, Islamic Studies available for Islamic students
- Established: 1978
- Principal: Ian Temple
- Grades: Nursery to Year 13
- Enrollment: Approximately 2035 (as of September 2023)
- Campus: Urban
- Colours: White, Light blue, navy blue,
- Website: aaess.org
- Last updated: 31 December 2025

Al Ain English Speaking School (AAESS) is the only coeducational independent all-through school in Al Ain, United Arab Emirates, catering to ages three to 18; Nursery, Primary, Secondary and Sixth Form.

== History ==
The school was founded in 1976 and started in a local villa. Mr. Colin Jones became the first governor with Mrs. Gill Didcott becoming the inaugural Principal. The school was first called the Balfour School, before building on the site where it stands today in 1978 and becoming Al Ain English Speaking School. It has been expanded and enhanced considerably since then due to its popularity. The school was significantly expanded during the summer of 2014 and then again in 2016 with a new primary building being completed for the start of the academic term of 2019, with independent Primary Science Labs an ICT Labs being completed.

In May 2022, the school became the first school in Al Ain to be endorsed by the British Government and be quality assured by Ofsted, gaining the British Schools Overseas award and also gained the 'Very Good' inspection grading by Irtiqa'a.

The school is owned by Mohammed Al Ghussien who is the CEO of the Bin Harmal consortium, Stella Investments and part owner of the Abu Dhabi University.
