= Mall of Al Ain =

First mall in Al Ain, Abu Dhabi

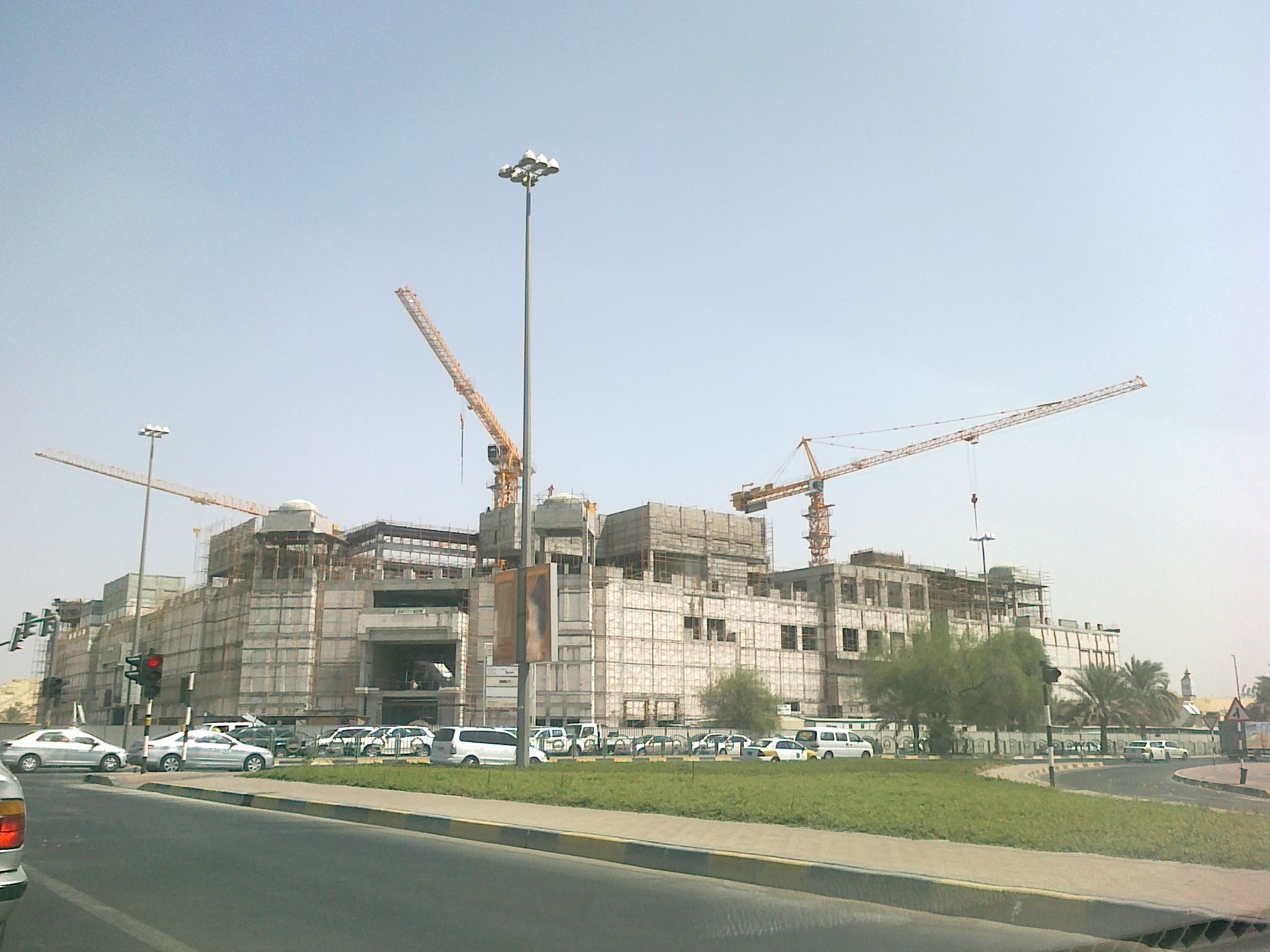
- Construction of the extension to Al Ain Mall in 2010
- Location: Al Ain, United Arab Emirates
- Coordinates: 24°13′18″N 55°46′55″E
- Opened: September 2001; extension opened on 7 November 2011
- Previous names: Al Ain Mall
- Developer: Al Ain Mall
- Manager: Makani
- Num. of stores: 250+ stores
- Floor area: 2,662,500 sq ft (247,350 m^{2})
- Floors: 3
- Parking: 3,000 covered parking on three basement levels
- Website: www.makanimallofalain.com

Mall of Al Ain (formerly Al Ain Mall) is a shopping and entertainment center in Al Ain, Emirate of Abu Dhabi, United Arab Emirates.

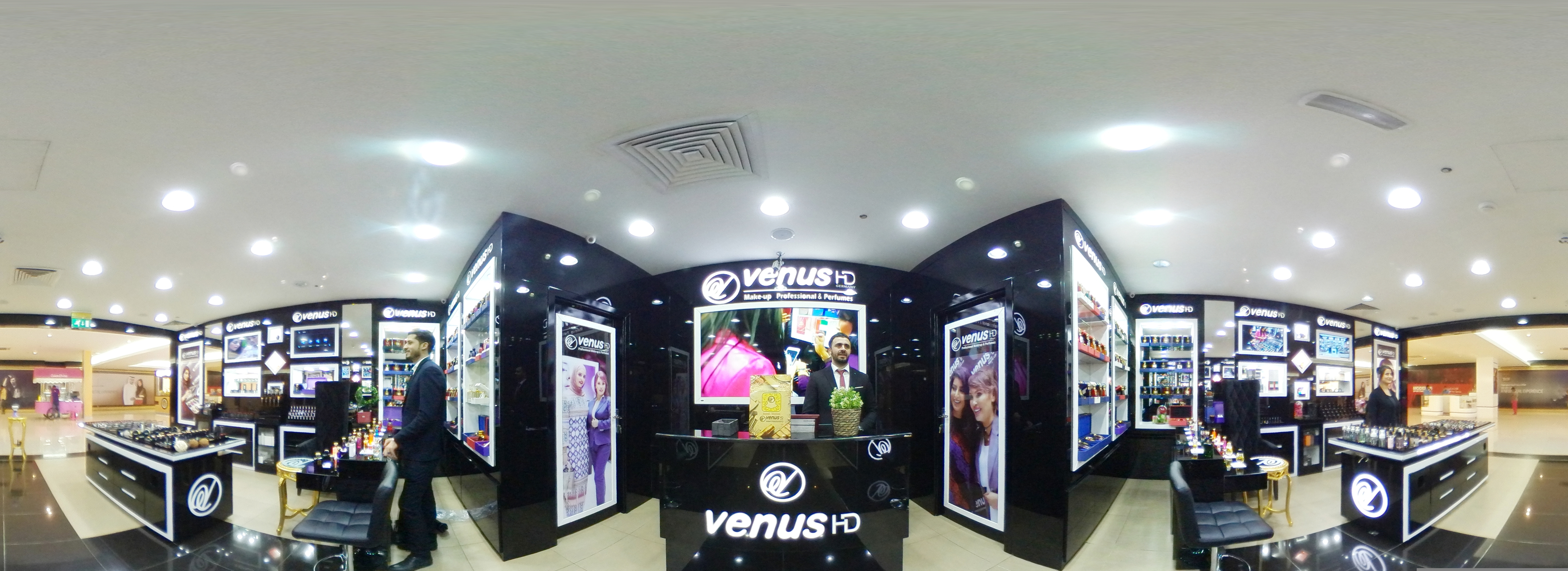
Al Ain Mall

The Mall was established as Al Ain's first shopping mall in 2001 with around a hundred retail outlets. In 2011, the Mall was expanded to add about 350,000 ft^{2} (33,000 m^{2}) of retail gross leasable area (GLA) to the existing Mall, to transform it to a regional mall with a total GLA of 1,000,000 ft^{2} (93,000 m^{2}) Phase one of the expansion was completed and opened to public in November 2011, adding 150+ retail outlets, along with 3-level basement car parking for 3,000 cars.

== See also ==
- List of shopping malls in Al Ain
