= Belvedere International School =

Coordinates: 24.31399°N 55.78690°E

- Hili, Al Ain; United Arab Emirates

Information
- Type: Independent school Day
- Chair of Governors: Salem Al Darmaki
- Principal: Ismat Daou
- Gender: Mixed
- Age: 3 Years to 13–16 (Year 11)
- Capacity: 1600
- Houses: Horses, Leopards, Eagles, Falcons
- Colours: Yellow, Golden, Green, Blue
- Website: belvedereinternationalschool.com

Belvedere International School is a British international day school in the United Arab Emirates.

Belvedere School in the UK was founded in 1880 as Liverpool High School, by the then Girls' Public Day School Company (which became the Girls' Day School Trust). The name was changed to The Belvedere School in 1911. Belvedere International School takes boys and girls aged 3 to 16 (up to Year 11 – 2022/23). It is a member of BSME (British Schools of the Middle East) and the ISA (Independent School Association) and a sister school to Belvedere Academy in Liverpool, England. The School motto is 'Ad Vitam Paramus'.

== Location ==
Belvedere School has a large purpose-built campus, with a capacity of around 1,600 students. The school facilities include a science laboratory, an indoor swimming pool, gymnasium. cafeteria, outdoor play area and library.

== Curriculum ==
Belvedere currently operates classes for children from FS1 to Year 11. The school delivers the English National Curriculum. Students receive a PE and swimming session each week.
