= Qattara Oasis =

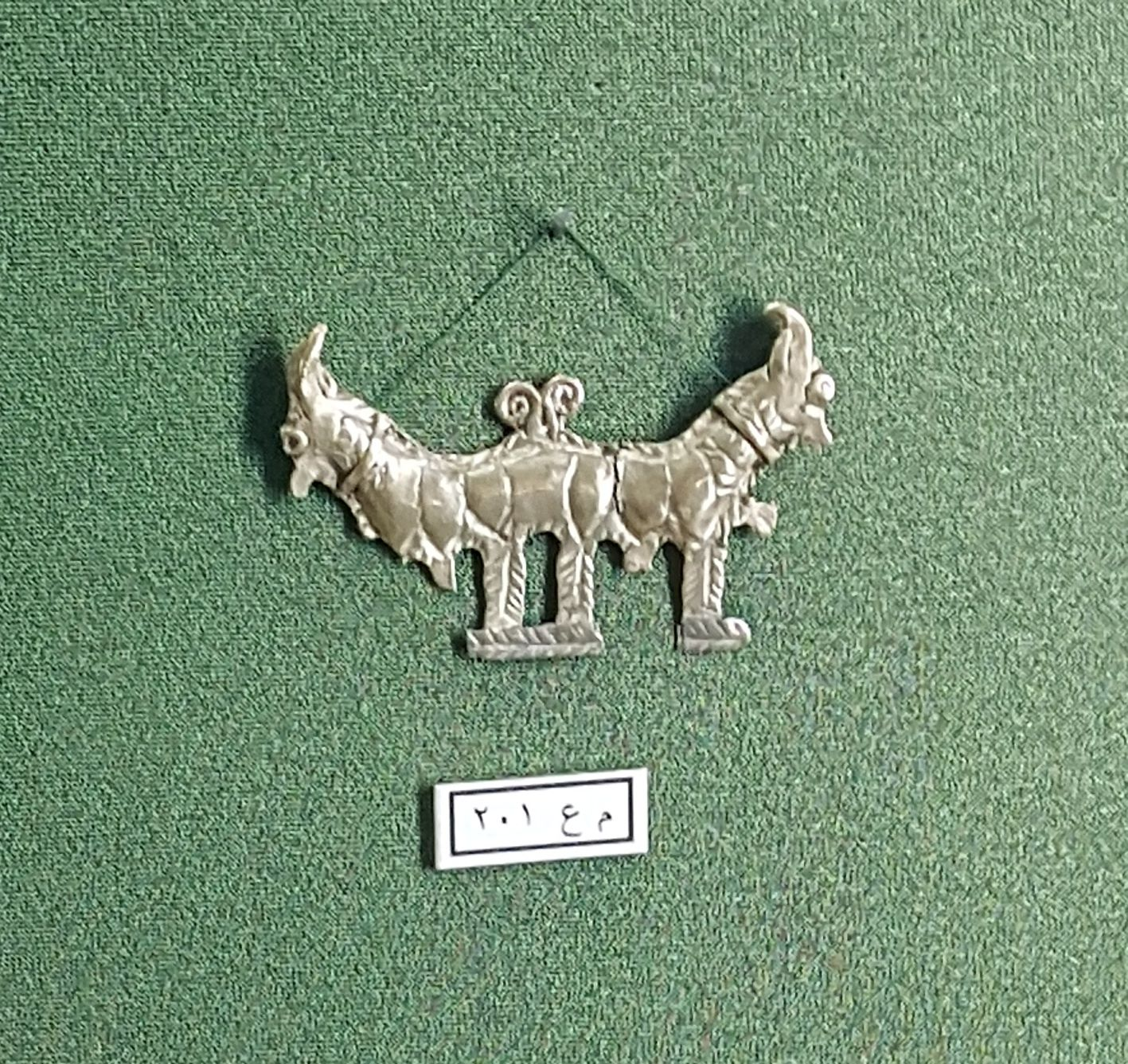
A pendant depicting a pair of entwined, horned animals found at Qattara Oasis, Al Ain

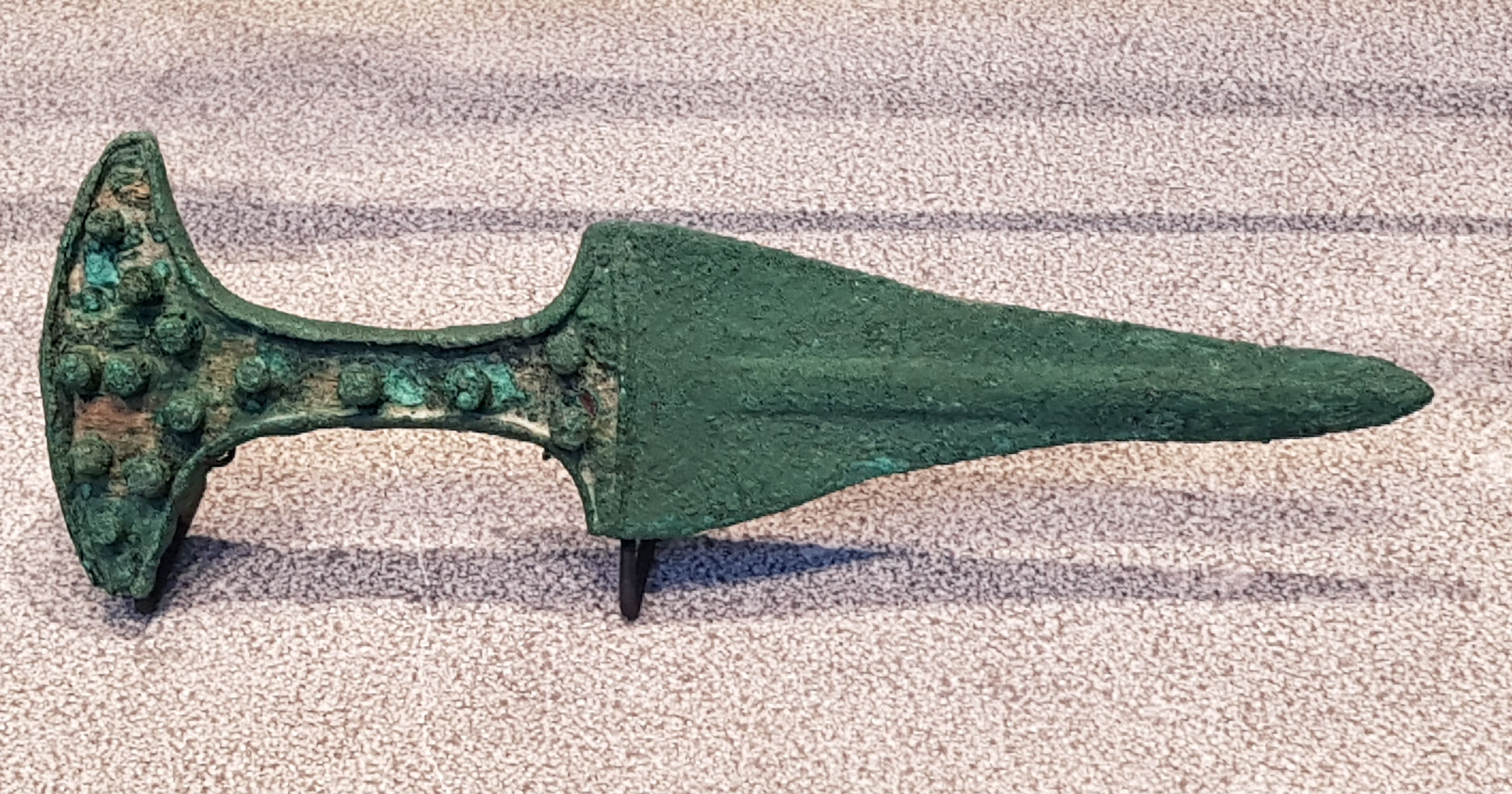
An iron age dagger, dated to 1,000 BCE, from Qattara. Displayed at the Louvre Abu Dhabi, on loan from Al Ain Museum.

Qattara Oasis (Arabic: وَاحَـة الْـقَـطَّـارَة, romanized: Wāḥat al-Qaṭṭārah) is an area of irrigated date farm in Al Ain, United Arab Emirates featuring a distinctive falaj (Arabic: فَـلَـج) irrigation system as well as a late Bronze Age archaeological site dated to 1800–1500 BCE, in the prehistoric period of Arabia. The oasis has been extensively surveyed by students from Al Ain University since 2015, and is home to 19 buildings of varying antiquity, of which nine are mosques. Among these are thought to be some of the oldest buildings still standing in Al Ain.

== History ==
Finds from the 14 metres (46 feet) Bronze Age burial at Qattara include Wadi Suq era chlorite jugs and bowls, bronze swords of between 30 and 60 cm (12 and 24 in) in length, and late Bronze Age and Iron Age short swords and daggers. Artefacts recovered also include carnelian jewellery, often associated by UAE historians with trading links to the Indus Valley. A find of particular interest from Qattara is a Bronze Age pendant discovered in the 1970s depicting a double-bodied or entwined pair of horned animals. Made from electrum, an alloy of silver and gold, the motif is found repeated in a number of Bronze Age sites in the UAE.

The Wadi Suq communal tomb at Qattara is thought to have been constructed from stones recovered from previous Umm Al Nar burials.

Late Iron Age weaponry found at Qattara (as well as Rumailah, Qusais and Buhais) supports the theory that the area, once known to the Sumerians as Magan, was known to the Achaemenids as the satrapy of Maka. Evidenced both in inscriptions and texts from Persepolis, Maka supplied troops to Xerxes to fight in his army in 480 BCE according to Herodotus' Histories. Iron Age short swords with distinctive crescent pommels of a type found in Qattara are identical in form to that borne by the figure of a native of Maka carved in Darius II’s grave relief at Persepolis.

== Recent buildings ==
Qattara also has an old souq dating back to the 1930s. Consisting itself of 19 shops arranged in an alley, the souq was partially restored in the 1970s. The falaj irrigation system at Qattara is protected by the Al Daramikah Tower, erected by the tribe which cultivated the oasis into the 20th century. They also give their name to a house adjacent to the tower, the Al Darmaki House.

=== The Darmaki House ===
The Darmaki House or Bait bin Ati Al Darmaki, has been the subject of a number of archaeological studies that have yielded some 15,000 pieces of late Islamic pottery, with finds of Chinese ceramics and Julfar ware from the period 1500-1650 BCE. Finds of light brownish orange to dark brown glazed Bahla or Khunj ware and monochrome green glazed ware were found also dated to this period. Later finds, principally identified as between 1650-1800 BCE, point to the possible use of the area as a dump for ceramics, given the profusion of finds, including Julfar ware, glazed ware and a larger proportion of Chinese ware - including one piece bearing the mark, in Chinese, ‘Chun-Li,’ or ‘Spring Breeze,’ on its base. Late Islamic finds, dating to approximately 1800-1950 BCE, included smaller amounts of Julfar ware, Chinese trade ware and Willow Pattern porcelain.

== See also ==
- Archaeology of the United Arab Emirates
- History of the United Arab Emirates
- Iron Age in the United Arab Emirates
- List of Ancient Settlements in the UAE
- List of cultural property of national significance in the United Arab Emirates
- Al Ain Oasis
- Tawam (region)
