= Archaeology of the United Arab Emirates =

The Archaeology of the United Arab Emirates is the study of past societies in the United Arab Emirates, formerly the Trucial States, through surviving artefacts of human material culture.

The United Arab Emirates was formerly populated by inhabitants of a number of coastal and inland settlements, with human remains pointing to a pattern of transmigration and settlement as far back as 125,000 years. Prehistoric settlement in the UAE spanned the Neolithic, with a number of distinctive eras of ancient settlement including the Stone Age Arabian Bifacial and Ubaid cultures from 5,000 to 3,100 BCE; the Hafit period with its distinctive beehive shaped tombs and Jemdet Nasr pottery, from 3,200 to 2,600 BCE; the Umm Al Nar period from 2,600 to 2,000 BCE; the Wadi Suq culture from 2,000 to 1,300 BCE and the three Iron Ages of the UAE.

The UAE's Iron Age I spanned 1,200–1,000 BCE; Iron Age II, 1,000–600 BCE and Iron Age III from 600 to 300 BCE. This was followed by the Hellenistic Mleiha (or Late Pre-Islamic) era, from 300 BCE onwards through to the Islamic era which commenced with the culmination of the 7th century Ridda Wars.

The remains of settlements, burials and other extensive evidence of human habitation throughout these eras is littered throughout the UAE, with many extensive finds of rich materials in the shape of pottery, jewellery, weapons and both human and animal remains providing archaeologists and researchers with an increasingly sophisticated picture of longstanding involvement in regional trade alongside nomadic cultures eking out a living from the frequently arid and inhospitable desert and mountain environment of the UAE.

The first modern digs to take place in the Trucial States were led by teams from the Danish Moesgaard Museum in 1959 and focused on the island of Umm Al Nar before going on to investigate the beehive tombs in and around the area of Al Ain (then often still known as Buraimi) in the emirate of Abu Dhabi.

== First discoveries ==
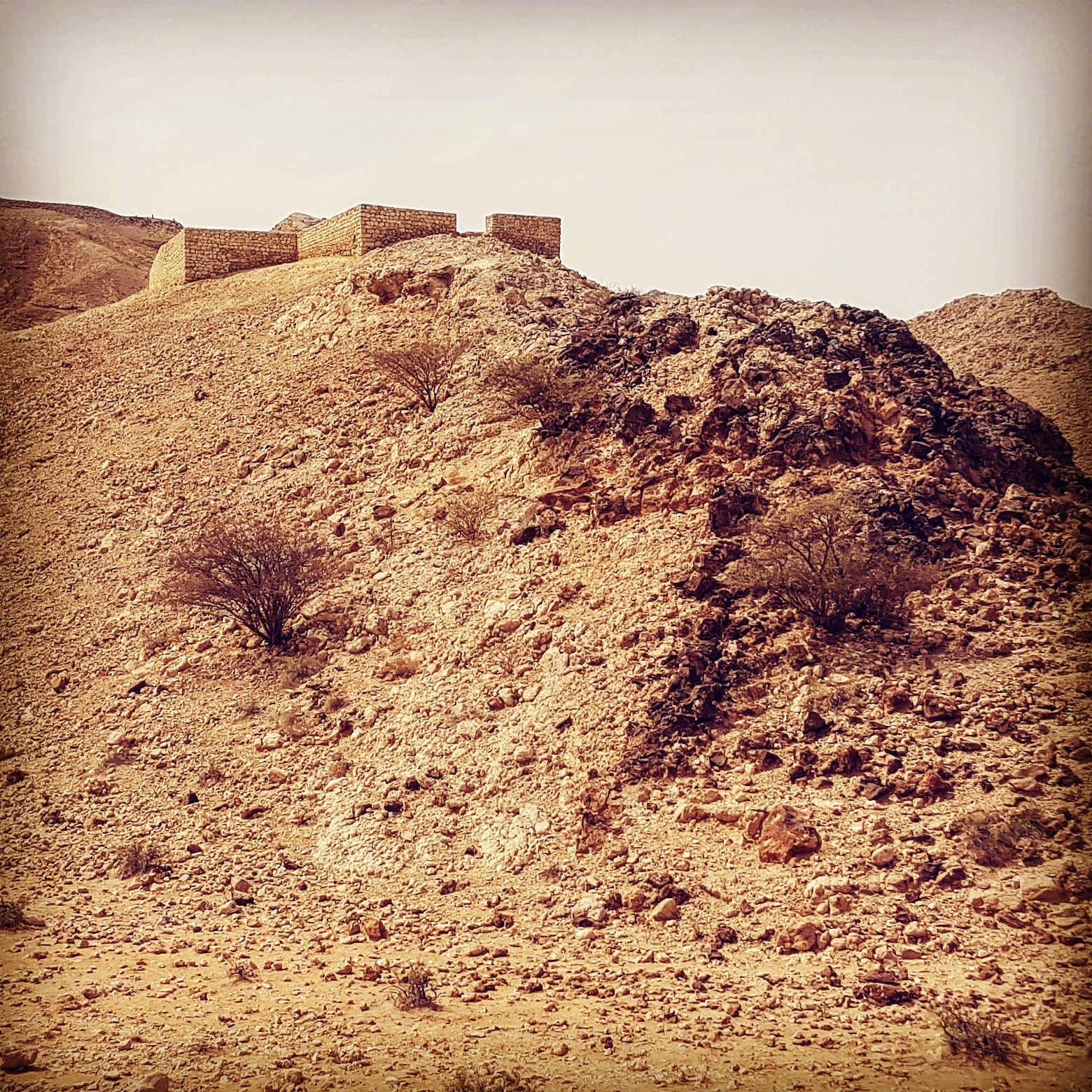
The Iron Age building at Jebel Buhais

The first archaeological excavations in the UAE were in 1959, led by Peter Glob and his assistant Geoffrey Bibby. Glob was a professor at Aarhus University and director of its Moesgaard Museum. He had undertaken a series of digs in Bahrain and was contacted by the director of Abu Dhabi Marine Areas Ltd, an oil company, Temple Hillyard, who invited them to visit a cistern and some potential grave sites he had found on the small island of Umm Al Nar (then referred to as Umm an-Nar), having been directed to the site by the-then Ruler of Abu Dhabi, Sheikh Shakhbut bin Sultan Al Nahyan. Hillyard had already determined that the tumuli were 'reminiscent of the Bronze Age one in Bahrain'.

Glob and Bibby's first expedition to the Trucial States took place from 15 February to 29 March 1959, with a £2,000 budget. They lived in a house built from areesh - palm fronds - on the island. Supplies were provided by oil company ADMA's stores on Das Island, including luxuries such as tinned salmon, steak, pork cutlets and lamb chops, cheese and cream crackers. Fourteen local workers was brought in to help with digginer at a salary of five rupees daily each.

During excavations at Umm Al Nar, the Ruler's brother, Sheikh Zayed bin Sultan Al Nahyan and his brother Hazza visited the dig and told the disbelieving archaeologists that there were many more such tumuli in Al Ain. He invited them to visit and led them to a group of some 317 burial cairns. Zayed later took members of the Danish team to other sites in the area, including a low tell which is now known as Rumailah, a significant Iron Age site.

It was not to be until 1970 that Danish archaeologist Karen Frifelt, preparing a Festschrift (a collection of articles brought together in celebration of a notable academic) for Glob's sixtieth birthday, linked the pottery that Glob's team took from the burials in the shadow of Jebel Hafit to the Sumerian Jemdet Nasr period (3100–2900 BCE). The discovery led to new focus on the beehive graves of Al Ain in the following two years – and the discovery of a new, earlier, cultural period in UAE history, the Hafit Period (3200–2600 BCE).

Subsequent excavations by teams from Iraq in the 1970s unveiled the Jebel Buhais site, as well as the hugely significant ancient city of Ed Dur. Since then, digs have taken place around the UAE by teams from universities in France, Spain, Germany, Jordan, Australia, and the UK.

== Prehistory ==
The Mleiha Archaeological Centre displays evidence of the oldest archaeological finds in the UAE, the prehistoric Faya-1 collection, now a UNESCO World Heritage Site, which dates human occupation in the area to 130,000–120,000 BCE, and has been linked to the movement of the first anthropologically modern humans from Africa to populate the world, before finds of a yet earlier date (50,000 years) had been found at Misliya cave in the Southern Levant. The Faya discovery, made in 2011, includes primitive hand-axes, as well as several kinds of scrapers and perforators, which resemble those used by early modern humans in East Africa. Through the technique of thermoluminescence dating the artefacts were placed at 125,000 years old. Before the discovery in the Levant, this had been the earliest evidence of modern humans found anywhere outside Africa, and implies modern humans left Africa much earlier than previously thought. Mleiha is also the site of Neolithic as well as Umm Al Nar period burials, and gives its name to the Hellenistic Mleiha period (now more commonly referred to as the 'Pre-Islamic'), from 300 BCE onwards, characterised by the extensive fortified compound, 'Mleiha Fort', which was discovered in the late 1990s and is thought to have been possibly the seat of an ancient South Arabian kingdom. Recent (2017) studies using Ground Penetrating Radar have uncovered significant unexcavated PIR era buildings and structures in the area around Mleiha.

The oldest radiometrically dated inland burial site in the UAE is the extensive necropolis at Jebel Buhais. The site, located near Madam, in Sharjah, consists of burial sites spanning the Stone, Bronze, Iron and pre-Islamic ages of human settlement in the UAE. Burials at Jebel Buhais (Jebel is Arabic for mountain) date back to the 5th millennium BCE.

== Arabian Neolithic ==
Recent archaeological work by the Department of Culture and Tourism – Abu Dhabi (DCT) has significantly expanded knowledge of the Arabian Neolithic period (c. 6600–3300 BCE) in the UAE, particularly through excavations on the offshore islands of the Al Dhafra region of Abu Dhabi emirate and along the northern UAE coastline.

On Ghagha Island, excavations conducted between 2019 and 2024 by DCT Abu Dhabi have uncovered three successive Neolithic sites (GHG0014, GHG0063, GHG0088). The site of GHG0014, dated to c. 6600–6500 cal. BCE, contains what are currently the oldest known stone-built structures in the Arabian Gulf region. The site of GHG0088, dated to c. 6400–5400 cal. BCE, has yielded stone architecture, a human funerary deposit, marine shell tools, plaster vessels, and a lithic industry. Faunal analysis indicates a subsistence economy heavily reliant on marine resources. A hiatus in occupation attributed to aridification associated with the 8.2 kiloyear event separates the site's two main phases of occupation.

Marawah Island, located in the western Abu Dhabi emirate, hosts one of the most significant Neolithic settlement and funerary complexes in the Arabian Gulf. The site of MR11 comprises a group of stone-built mounds (Areas A to G), radiocarbon-dated to between c. 5800 and 5500 BCE, and has been under excavation by DCT Abu Dhabi since 2004. The architectural organisation includes a tripartite house (Area A), multi-roomed structures (Areas B and C), and a mortuary complex (Area F). Excavations of Area F have revealed several Neolithic interments deposited within the cells of the main structure, including the oldest known primary Neolithic burial in the UAE, dated to c. 5700 cal. BCE. At least five individuals were recovered from a single cell, with larger domestic rooms flanked by smaller dedicated burial chambers, providing new insight into the funerary practices and social organisation of Arabian Neolithic island communities. MR11 has also yielded the earliest known evidence of pearling in the Arabian Gulf, as well as what is considered the oldest known Ubaid pottery vessel recovered in situ in the region, a jar dated to c. 5550 BCE and indicative of long-distance exchange networks extending to Mesopotamia during the Neolithic.

Delma Island, also in the Al Dhafra region, has yielded Neolithic and Ubaid-period remains including lithics, faunal assemblages, and early evidence of date palm exploitation, indicative of sustained maritime occupation from the late sixth millennium BCE.

Along the northern UAE coastline, the French Archaeological Mission in the United Arab Emirates has excavated a series of Neolithic shell midden sites in the lagoon environment of Umm al-Quwain emirate. The site of UAQ2, occupied from the late sixth to the early fourth millennium BCE, represents one of the longest stratigraphic Neolithic sequences known in the Arabian Gulf, with evidence of diversified fishing economies, pastoral activity, and one of the oldest known burial grounds in the region. The nearby site of Akab, located on a small islet within the Umm al-Quwain lagoon and dated to c. 4600–3500 BCE, is one of the most remarkable Neolithic coastal sites in Eastern Arabia. Excavations by the French Archaeological Mission in the United Arab Emirates have revealed a settlement combining intensive fishing with specialised maritime hunting and evidence of early pearling. The site has yielded one of the largest ichthyofaunal assemblages from the Arabian Neolithic, comprising over 37,000 fish remains from more than 50 species, documenting intensive exploitation of coastal pelagic and reef fish populations. Numerous natural pearls were recovered from the excavations alongside shell hooks manufactured from pearl oyster shell, constituting some of the earliest known direct evidence of pearl fishing in the Arabian Gulf. The site is particularly noted for the discovery of a dugong bone mound — a structured platform of dugong skulls laid in parallel and ribs arranged in sets, dated to c. 3500–3300 BCE and interpreted as the oldest known ritual sanctuary in Arabia and the oldest ceremonial structure dedicated to a marine mammal documented anywhere in the world. This feature has been compared to analogous dugong bone platforms recorded ethnographically in the Torres Strait and is thought to reflect the ritual significance of dugong hunting in the symbolic practices of Neolithic coastal communities of the Gulf.

These discoveries collectively establish the UAE coastline and its offshore islands as a zone of sustained early coastal sedentarism in the Arabian Gulf, with communities sustaining themselves through diversified marine resource exploitation including fishing, shellfishing, and pearling. The evidence predates previously documented domestic architecture in the region by several centuries and contributes to ongoing revisions of Neolithisation models for the Arabian Peninsula.

The archaeological record shows that the Arabian Neolithic period progressively came to an end in eastern Arabia and the Oman peninsula throughout the 4th millennium BC, just after the phase of lake lowering and onset of dune reactivation. Apart from Akab, there is rare evidence of human presence in the area for approximately 1,000 years, the so-called 'Dark Millennium. This is thought to be consistent with changing patterns of human life as a result of climate change: a spring discovered at Jebel Buhais dried up at this stage, an event contemporaneous with similar discoveries pointing to increased aridity in the interior of Oman. Throughout Southern Arabia, evidence of human inland settlement in the 3rd millennium BCE is scant.

== Ed-Dur ==
One of the most significant archaeological sites in the UAE is that at Ed-Dur, an Ancient Near Eastern City located in Umm Al Qawain. One of the largest sites in the country, comprising an area of some five kilometres, the coastal settlement overlooks the Al Beidha Lake. It has been dubbed 'one of the most significant lost cities of Arabia'. It was first discovered by an Iraqi archaeological team in 1973 and first dug in 1974. Subsequent digs have unearthed evidence of human habitation spanning the Ubaid period, Stone Age, Bronze Age, Iron Age, and Pre-Islamic period. During the latter period the settlement appears to have been at its most prosperous and the hills of the area were entirely covered with dozens of buildings and thousands of stone-built tombs. Some 500 of these tombs have been excavated, with grave goods discovered including drinking sets, Roman glass, weaponry, pottery, jewelry and ivory objects. It is thought some 20,000 tombs are on the site in all. Similarly, the necropolis of Jebel Buhais spans a remarkable period, with burials evident as far back as the fifth millennium BCE, while Mleiha also represents human settlement dating back some 7,000 years.

== Hafit period ==
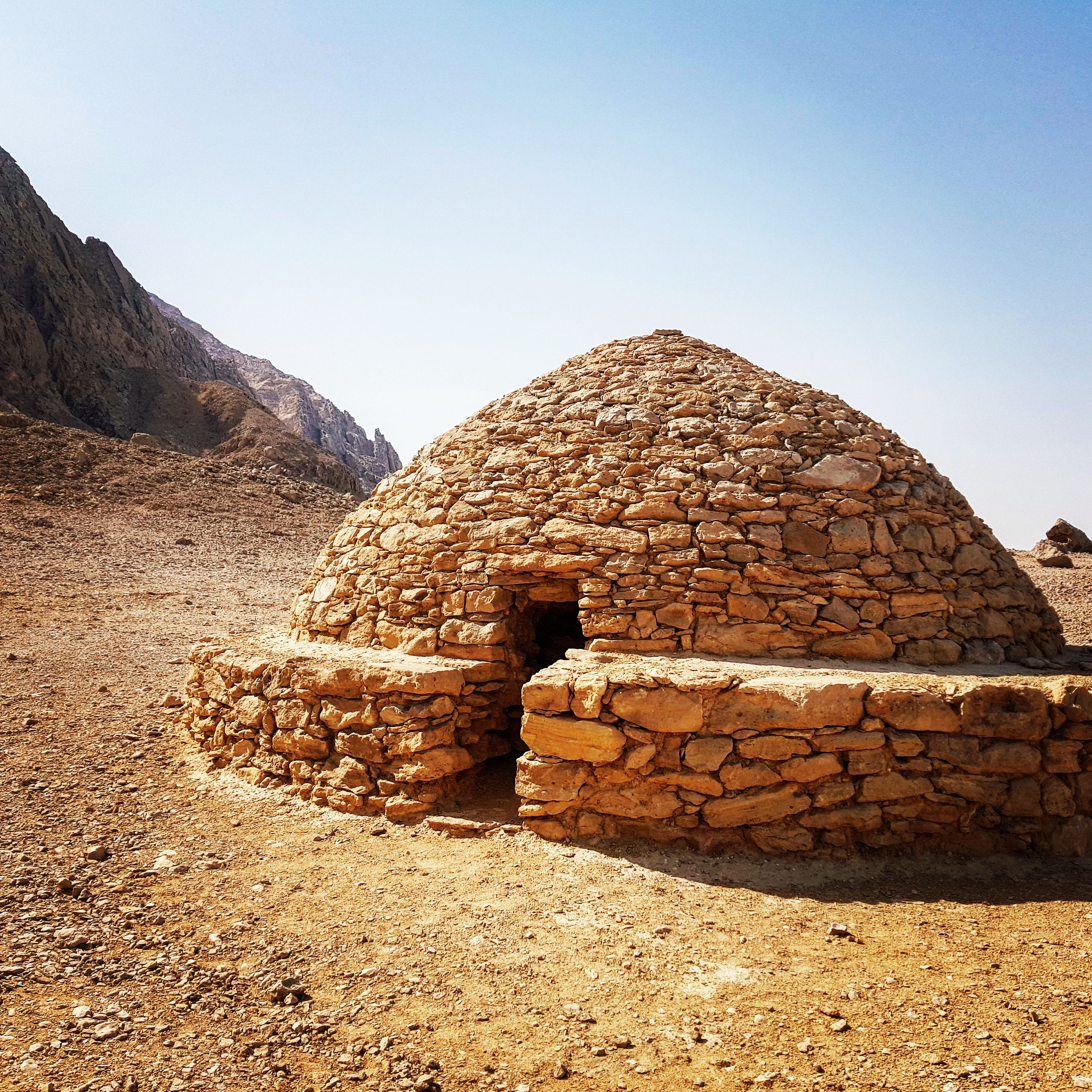
Hafit period beehive tomb at Jebel Hafit

The Hafit period is marked by (and named for) the distinctive 'beehive' tombs first discovered around the area of Jebel Hafit in Al Ain. The period defines early Bronze Age human settlement in the United Arab Emirates and Oman in the period from 3,200 to 2,600 BC. Hafit period tombs and remains have also been located across the UAE and Oman in sites such as Bidaa bint Saud, Jebel Buhais and Buraimi in the UAE and Bat, Al-Khutm and Al-Ayn in Oman.

The first find of Hafit era tombs is attributed to the Danish archaeologist P.V. Glob of the Moesgaard Museum (who also investigated Umm Al Nar) in 1959, and the first of many excavations of these took place a few years later. uncovering the remains of some 317 circular stone tombs and settlements from the Hafit period, as well as wells and partially underground falaj irrigation systems, and mud brick constructions intended for a range of defensive, domestic and economic purposes. The Al Ain Oasis, in particular, provides evidence of construction and water management enabling the early development of agriculture for five millennia, up until the present day.

Pottery finds at Hafit period sites demonstrate trading links to Mesopotamia, contiguous to the Jemdat Nasr period (3100–2900 BC). Evidence of trading links with Mesopotamia are also found in the subsequent Umm Al Nar and Wadi Suq periods of UAE history.

== Umm Al Nar period ==
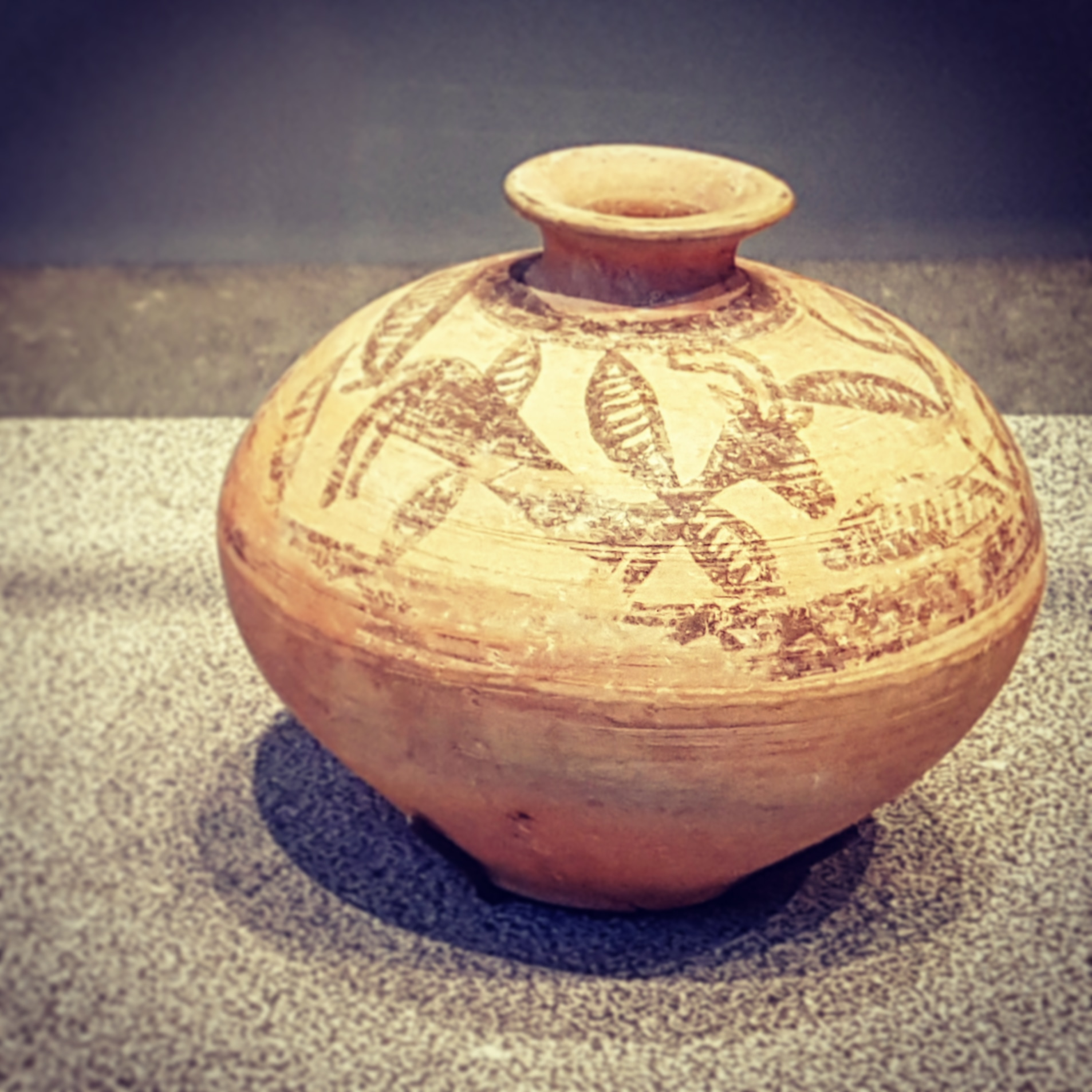
Umm Al Nar period terracotta bottle on display at the Louvre, Abu Dhabi.

The Bronze Age Umm Al Nar period spans the period 2600–2000 BCE. The name is derived from the first excavations which took place at Umm Al Nar, an island on the coast of Abu Dhabi, in 1959. The distinctive circular tombs of the Umm Al Nar period distinguish it from the preceding Hafit period, together with finds of distinctive black on red decorated pottery and jewellery made with gems such as carnelian, sourced from the Indus Valley.

Seven tombs from a total of fifty and three areas at the ruins of the ancient settlement were examined by the Danish archaeologists in the 1959 season. During their first visit they identified a few exposed shaped stones fitted together at some of the stone mounds. The following year, the first excavations started at one of the mounds on the plateau, now called Tomb I. Two more seasons (1960 and 1961) involved digging more tombs, while the last three seasons (1962–63, 1964 and 1965) were allocated to examining the settlement.

The Danish excavations at Umm Al Nar halted in 1965 but work resumed in 1975 by an archaeological team from Iraq. During the Iraqi excavations which lasted one season, five tombs were excavated and a small section of the village was examined. Between 1970 and 1972 an Iraqi restoration team headed by Shah Al Siwani, former member of the Antiquities Director in Baghdad, restored and/or reconstructed the Danish excavated tombs.

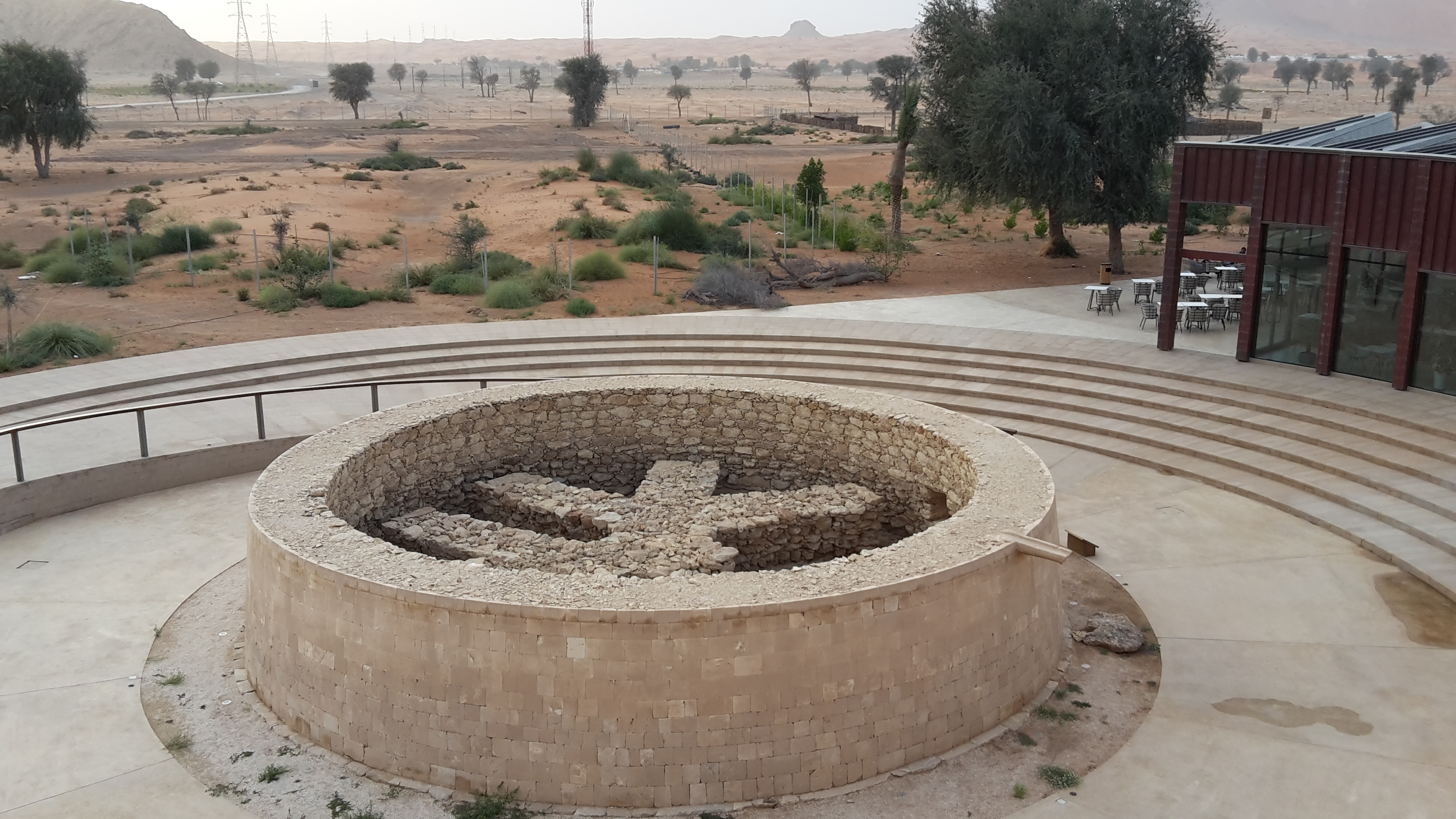
Umm Al Nar tomb at Mleiha

At Al Sufouh Archaeological Site in Dubai, archaeological excavation between 1994 and 1995, revealing an Umm Al Nar type circular tomb dating between 2500 and 2000 B.C. Dubai Municipality and the Sanisera Archaeology Institute conducted excavations at the site of Al Ashoosh between November 2015 and May 2016. The site was discovered during two seasons of survey in 2002–2003 following the discovery of the nearby Iron Age metallurgical centre Saruq Al Hadid, and is located 8 km from that site.

Surveys in the area by Dubai Municipality and the Department of Antiquities of Jordan identified 33 archaeological sites ranging in date from prehistory to the late Islamic period. In 2006–2007, more-detailed archaeological investigations of the area of Al-Ashoosh were conducted, including survey, excavation and geological sampling.

At Tell Abraq, settlements associated with the start of the Umm Al Nar culture began c. 2500 BC. Finds at Shimal and Ed Dur also point to a transitional period between the Umm Al Nar and following Wadi Suq periods. The excavations at Shimal, principally those of the mid-1980s by a team from the University of Göttingen in Germany, are significant as they provided early evidence of the 'Wadi Suq' period, including finds of pottery, soft-stone vessels, bronze and copper weapons and beads which came to be regarded as typical of the period c. 2000–1300 BC in the UAE.

== Wadi Suq period ==
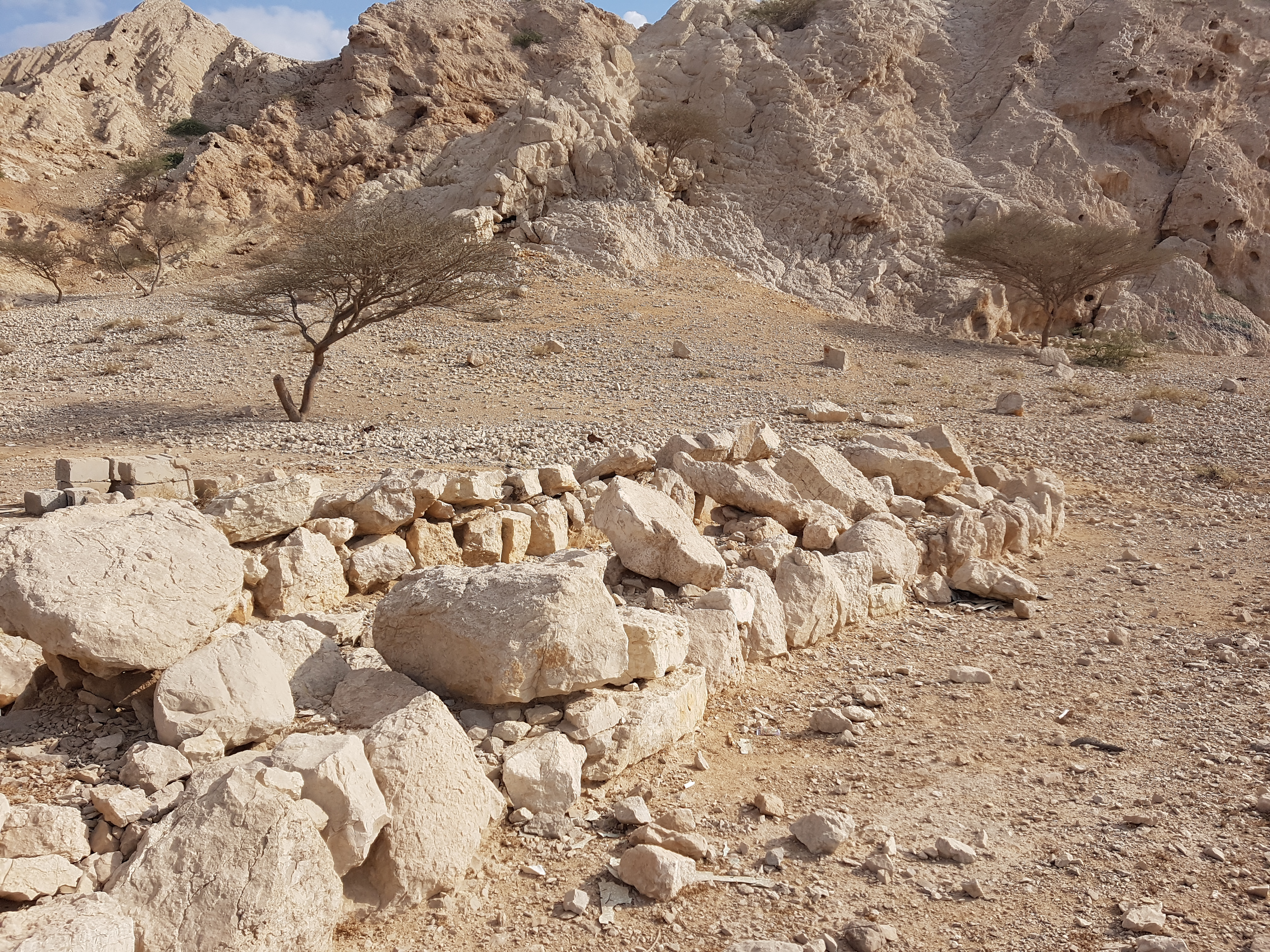
Wadi Suq burial at Shimal, Ras Al Khaimah

The Wadi Suq culture flourished in the period from 2,000 to 1,300 BCE. It takes its name from a wadi, or waterway, East of Sohar in Oman. Rather than a seismic cultural shift, a gradual change in human society which is centred around more sophisticated approaches to animal husbandry, particularly the domestication of the camel, as well as changes in the surrounding trade and social environments, took place between the Umm Al Nar and Wadi Suq periods. The transition between Umm Al Nar and Wadi Suq is thought to have taken some 200 years and more, with finds at the important Wadi Suq site of Tell Abraq in modern Umm Al Quwain showing evidence of the continuity of Umm al-Nar burials. At Qattara Oasis in Al Ain, the Wadi Suq communal tomb is thought to have been constructed from stones recovered from previous Umm Al Nar burials.

Evidence of increased mobility among the population points to a gradual change in human habits rather than sudden change and important Wadi Suq era sites such as Tell Abraq, Ed Dur, Seih Al Harf, Shimal and Kalba show an increasing sophistication in copper and bronze ware as well as trade links both east to the Indus Valley and west to Mesopotamia.

Changes in two important trading partners also took place during this period, with the Mesopotamian city of Ur falling to Elam in 2,000 BC and the decline of the Indus Valley Harappan Culture in 1,800 BC. The abandonment of the port of Umm Al Nar took place at around this time.

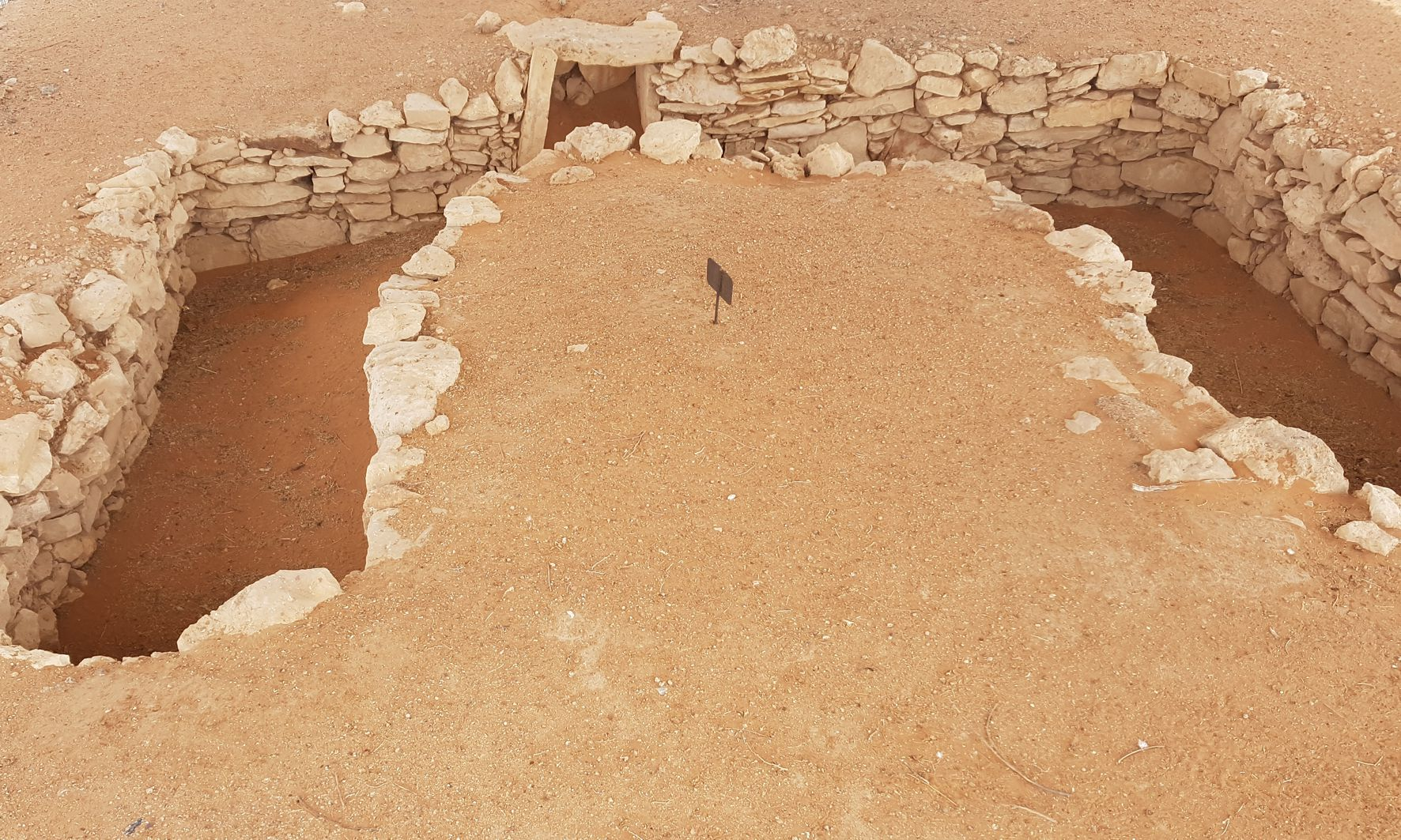
Wadi Suq burial at Jebel Buhais

The Wadi Suq site at Seih Al Harf in Ras Al Khaimah was first excavated by a team from the University of Durham, led by Derek Kennet, in the spring of 2013. The site comprises a series of 50 burial sites, of which two were directly threatened by road development, an 18-metre horseshoe shaped and a W-shaped tomb. Both were collective graves. Ten other excavated features were also impacted by the road development. Although the site was seen to be threatened by the development of the northern extension of the arterial Emirates Road (E611), with proposals tabled to amend the road development to avoid damage to the site, the road project went ahead.

A number of Wadi Suq and Iron Age discoveries were made in the mountain village of Bithnah in Fujairah, first excavated by the Swiss-Liechtenstein Foundation for Archaeological Research Abroad (SLFA) between 1987 and 1991. Presided over by Prince Hans-Adam II of Liechtenstein, and directed in the field by Pierre Corboud, the SLFA team conducted several seasons of survey in the mountainous inland area of Fujairah, including the excavations at Bithnah, where a communal grave site was uncovered as well as a number of Iron Age finds. There have also been excavations by teams from the University of Geneva and French National Research Centre. Significant Iron Age finds have been made throughout the area, including a number of petroglyphs.

== Iron Age ==
From 1,200 BC to the advent of Islam in Eastern Arabia, through three distinctive Iron Ages (Iron Age 1, 1200–1000 BC; Iron Age II, 1000–600 BC and Iron Age III 600–300 BC) and the Hellenistic Mleiha period (300 BC onward), the area was variously occupied by Archaemenid and other forces and saw the construction of fortified settlements and extensive husbandry thanks to the development of the falaj irrigation system (also called qanat). Early finds of aflaj, particularly those around the desert city of Al Ain, have been cited as the earliest evidence of the construction of these waterways. It is thought nearby Bidaa bint Saud became an important site during the Iron Age, both as a caravan stop and as a settled community of farmers that used the falaj irrigation system there. Two of these irrigation passages have been partly excavated at Bidaa bin Saud, with a number of sections remaining in reasonable condition. In one of the excavations, a number of sandstone-lined shaft holes were discovered, as well as a stepped underground access point and a large open cistern. Evidence of formerly irrigated land has also been found at the site.

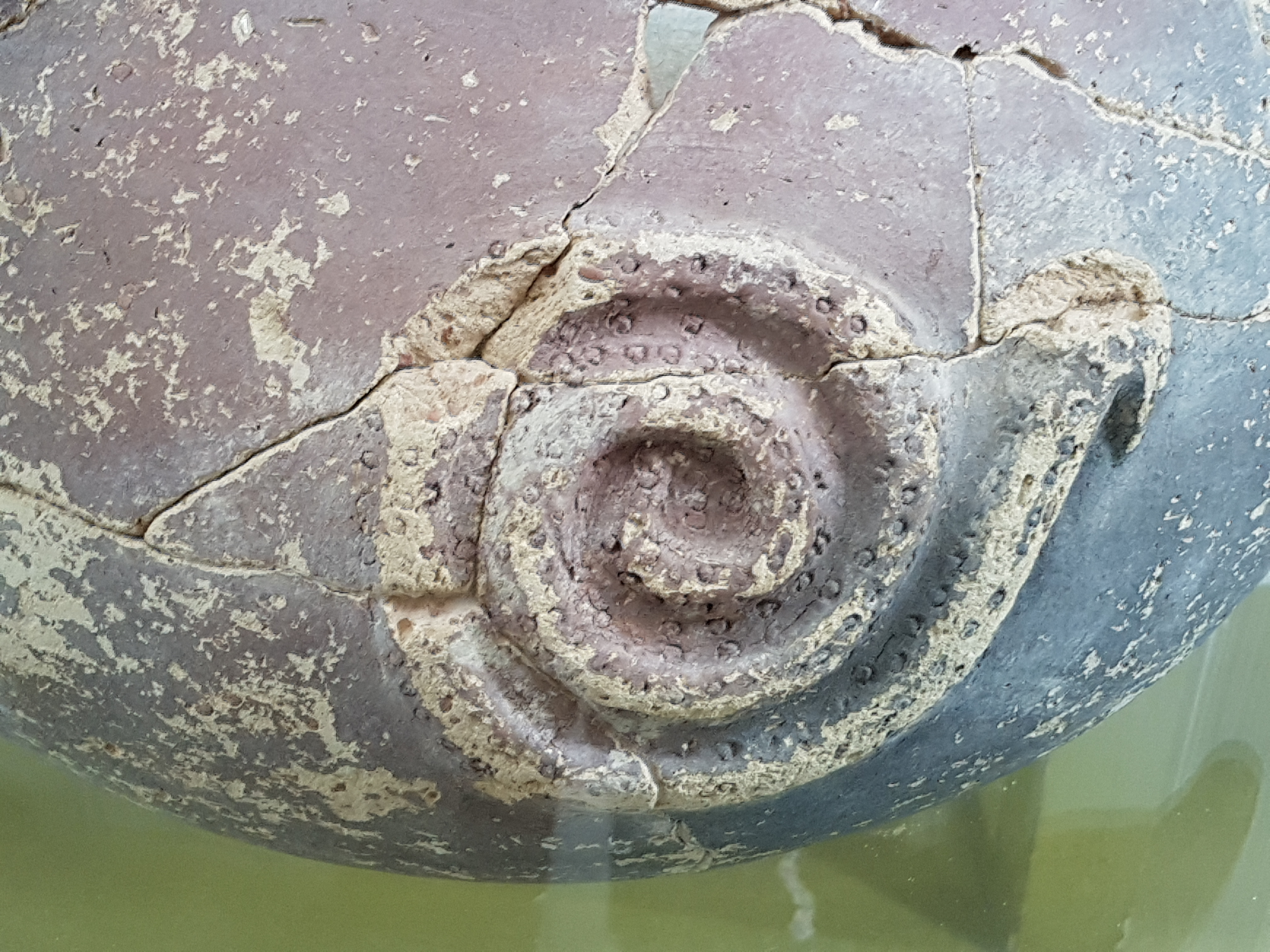
Snake decoration on a pot from Rumailah

Important Iron Age centres in the UAE have rendered an unusual richness in finds to archaeologists, particularly the spectacular metallurgical centre of Saruq Al Hadid in what is today Dubai. Other important Iron Age settlements in the country include Al Thuqeibah, Madam, Bidaa bint Saud, Ed-Dur and Tell Abraq.

=== Iron Age aflaj ===
Recent finds of pottery in Thuqeibah and Madam have further linked the development of early aflaj (or qanat) water systems there to an Iron Age II date, further substantiating the attribution of the innovation of these water systems to a southeastern Arabian origin based on the extensive archaeological work of Dr Wasim Takriti around the area of Al Ain.

The 2002 publication of a paper by Tikriti, The south-east Arabian origin of the falaj system, provided the first counterpoint to the long-accepted narrative, that the Qanat originated in Persia and was identified as such by accounts of the campaigns of the Assyrian King, Sargon II, in 714 BCE. Tikriti cites this and also accounts by the Greek second and third century historian Polybius as being the basis for academic attribution of the technology to Persia. He notes academics such as JC Wilkinson (1977) adopting an Iranian origin for the technology under the influence of Sargon's annals and Polybius, but points out at least seven Iron Age aflaj (plural for falaj, the word used to denote waterways of this type in the United Arab Emirates) recently discovered in the Al Ain area of the UAE have been reliably carbon dated back to the beginning of the first millennium BCE. Additional to finds of Iron Age aflaj in Al Ain, Tikrit pointed to excavations in Al Madam, Sharjah, by the French archaeological team working there, as well as by a German team working in Maysar, in Oman. Tikriti is at pains to point out that, despite long-standing efforts since the 19th century to excavate qanat systems in Iran, no evidence has been found for any such qanat there dated earlier than the 5th century BCE. He concludes that the technology originated in South East Arabia and was likely taken to Persia, likely by the Sasanian conquest of the Oman peninsular.

Others have followed Tikriti's lead. In 2016, Rémy Boucharlat in his paper Qanāt and Falaj: Polycentric and Multi-Period Innovations Iran and the United Arab Emirates as Case Studies, asserted that the attribution of the technology to Iranians in the early first millennium BCE is a position that cannot longer be maintained. He asserts that the carbon dating of alfaj in Oman and the UAE to the ninth century BCE by Cleuziou and evidence for such an early date provided by Tikriti are definitive. Additionally, Boucharlat maintains that no known Iranian qanat can be dated to the pre-Islamic period.

=== Burials ===
Iron Age burials at Jebel Buhais, particularly the group of graves defined as BHS 85, are thought to be linked to the nearby Iron Age settlement site of Al Thuqeibah. The site was originally excavated by teams from the Autonomous University of Madrid in the mid-1990s. Thuqeibah has been dated from the Iron Age II and III periods (1100–400 BC). A settlement consisting of a number of houses and a well, it has been associated with a nearby Iron Age falaj system, thought to date from the Iron Age II era. 1st Millennium aflaj have also been unearthed at nearby Al Madam.

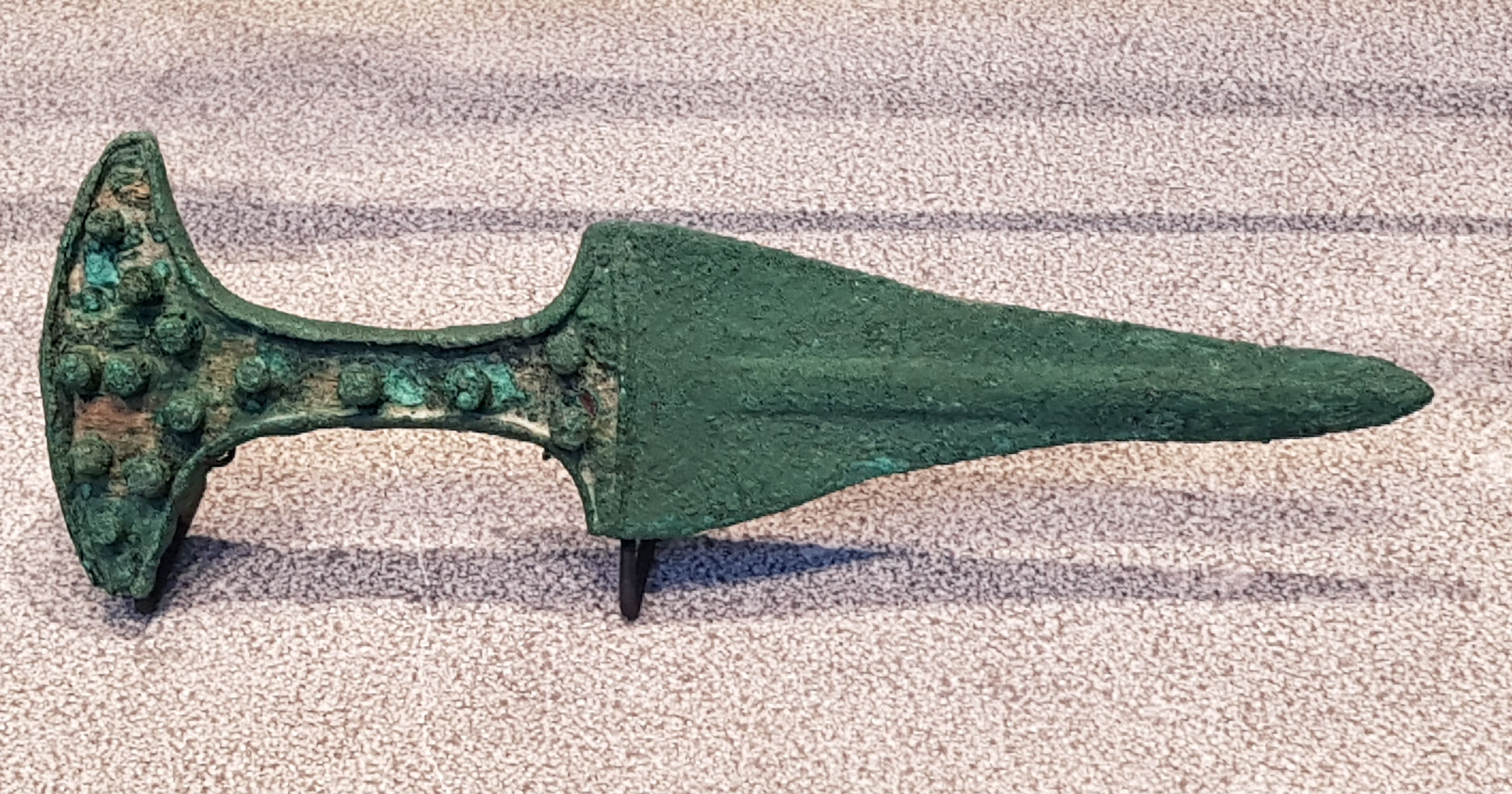
Iron Age dagger from Qattara

The site of Rumailah, in Al Ain, like many in the UAE spans a wide period with finds dating back to the Umm Al Nar period, but shows a flourishing during the Iron Age. Finds at Rumailah include distinctive pottery adorned with snake patterns, similar to finds at Qusais, Masafi and the major Iron and Bronze Ages; metallurgical production centre at Saruq Al Hadid, as well as chlorite vessels decorated with turtles alternating with trees, similar to finds from Qidfa' in Fujairah, Qusais in Dubai and Al-Hajar in Bahrain. A number of Iron Age swords and axe-heads, as well as distinctive seal moulds, were also recovered from the site. A number of bronze arrowheads were also found at the site. The Iron Age buildings found at Rumailah are typical of those found in the region, at Iron Age I and II sites such as Al Thuqeibah and Muweilah, with a number of row dwellings, although lacking the perimeter walls found at Thuqeibah. A columned hall at Rumailah provides a further link to Muweilah, while a number of pyramidal seals found at Rumailah find an echo with similar objects discovered at Bidaa bint Saud.

One of the most significant Iron Age sites in the UAE is Muweilah, located in the Sharjah suburb of Al Jurainah, near Sharjah University City. A large, fortified settlement thought to have been occupied during the Iron Age II period (1100–600BC), the site has been explored by archaeologists since Muweilah was first identified in a survey conducted by the French Mission to the UAE in 1989, and excavated by an Australian expedition, which started work there in 1994 after the discovery of pottery shards by a local resident. It has yielded the oldest known example of writing found to date in the UAE, a pottery shard with an inscription, thought to be Sabean, with the letters 'bml'.

== Saruq Al Hadid ==
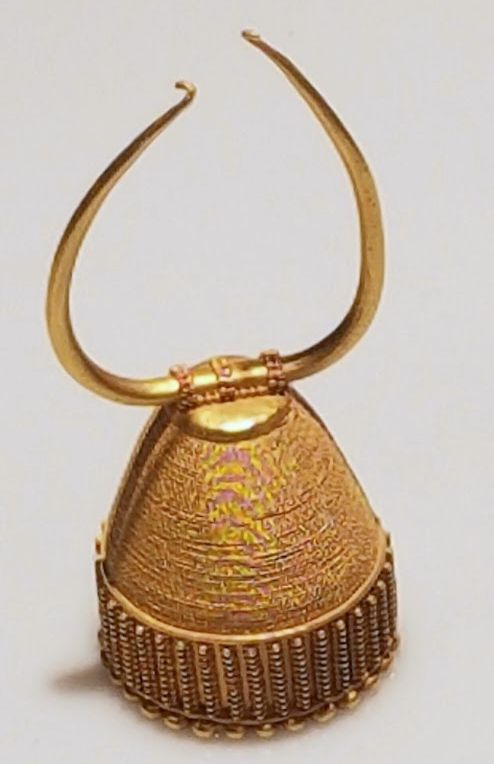
Gold jewelry from Saruq Al Hadid

The Saruq Al Hadid site in the desert south of Dubai was a centre of constant human habitation, trade and metallurgy from the Umm Al Nar period (2600–2000 BCE) to 1,000 BCE, when it was a major location for smelting bronze, copper and Iron. Arguably its most important period of flourishing was as a metallurgical centre in the Iron Age II period (1100–600 BCE). One of the many thousands of finds to be documented at the site was an ornate gold ring, which became the inspiration for Dubai's Expo 2020 logo.

Some of the many enigmas surrounding the site are its location far from sources of water, ore or firewood, all critical elements to a metallurgical centre. An abundance of pottery and metal artifacts have given rise to speculation of possibly identifying the site as a centre of snake worship. In all, over 12,000 unique objects have been unearthed at the site. A number of key finds are on public display at Dubai's Saruq Al Hadid Archaeology Museum in Al Shindagha, housed in a traditional barjeel (wind tower) building constructed in 1928 by Sheikh Juma bin Maktoum Al Maktoum.

== Pre-Islamic Recent ==
Archaeologists have relatively recently defined a stratification of the pre-Islamic (previously sometimes referred to as 'Hellenistic') era in the Emirates' archaeology into four distinct Pre-Islamic Recent ages: PIR A (350 BCE - 150 BCE); PIR B (150-0 BCE); PIR C (0 BCE to 100 CE) and PIR D (100CE - 350 CE). These definitions have been applied particularly to sites where constant phases of occupation and disruption occur in the pre-Islamic, post Iron-Age era such as Mleiha in Sharjah and the related site of Ed Dur in Umm Al Quwain, as well as the late pre-Islamic settlement at Kush, Ras Al Khaimah, with finds there spanning the Sasanian to Islamic eras.

== Islamic era finds ==
Archaeologists have worked on Islamic era sites across the UAE, particularly in Ras Al Khaimah (the coastal settlement of Julfar) as well as sites such as Bidayah on the east coast and Siniyah on the west coast.

=== Julfar ===
Julfar was an Islamic era port, trading entrepôt and settlement, It was a predecessor settlement to Ras Al Khaimah and, although often conflated with the 17th century emergence of the modern city of Ras Al Khaimah, represents a distinct era of human settlement and development from that of the modern city. Julfar's rise, efflorescence and fall took place between 1300 and 1650 CE.

Julfar is associated with its own predecessor settlement at Kush, and also with the construction of the fort at Shimal and the Wadi Sur defensive wall. The potential existence of a site at Julfar was first outlined by British archaeologist Beatrice di Cardi in 1968 during an extensive survey of Ras Al Khaimah that also identified the sites at Khatt and Kush. Di Cardi noted an area of the coast littered with Ming era porcelain and other pottery. The first excavations took place at Al Nudud in 1973/4 by an Iraqi team, with a subsequent investigation carried out in 1977/8 by John Hansman, who published his discoveries in Julfar - An Arabian Port. A number of excavations then took place between 1988 and 1994 that not only established Julfar as a major trading entrepôt but also as one of the most excavated sites in the Gulf. These digs, organised by the Ras Al Khaimah Department of Antiquities and Museums, brought in teams from the UK, France, Germany and Japan.

=== Bidayah ===
On the East Coast, in Fujairah, the village of Bidayah has been the focus of a number of explorations of its mosque and the remains of a Portuguese fort, discovered in the village by a team of Australian archaeologists. The fort, originally called 'Libidia', was identified from a 16th-century map. Its walls were constructed using rock recovered from a nearby tower dated back to the third millennium BCE. These walls, some 60 metres in length, are joined in a square with towers on each corner and stand today at a height of up to a meter. Finds at the site of the fort include locally made pottery dating back to the 17th and 18th centuries and charcoal samples unearthed were carbon dated to 1450–1600, within the context of the Portuguese presence in the Gulf.

The Bidayah mosque's date of construction is uncertain and because the mud and stone built structure uses no wood, radiocarbon dating is not possible. It is estimated to date to the 15th century, however some much earlier estimates have been proposed. The site was investigated by the archaeological center of Fujairah in co-operation with the University of Sydney from 1997 to 1998. and Fujairah Archaeology and Heritage Department came up with the conclusion that the mosque was believed to be built in 1446 AD, along with the two watch towers overlooking the mosque and the village.

=== Siniyah and Tawwam ===
Siniyah Island is a natural island situated off the coast of the Emirate of Umm Al Quwain. It is the site of the oldest pearl fishing town in the Persian Gulf, as well as of an Eastern Christian Monastery and Bishop's Palace, the largest such settlement of its time so far discovered in the Emirates. Siniyah has been identified through recent archaeological and archival work as the potential centre of the lost ancient town and region of Tu'am or Tawwam, with the name Tu'am ultimately derived from St Thomas the Apostle of the East.

=== Jumeirah ===
Significant Islamic era finds were also uncovered by digs in Dubai at the Jumeirah Archaeological Site, including a 10th-century caravanserai and souq.

== See also ==
- Abu Dhabi Islands Archaeological Survey
- History of the United Arab Emirates
- List of ancient settlements in the UAE
- List of cultural property of national significance in the United Arab Emirates
