= Saih Al Harf =

Bronze Age archaeological site in Ras Al Khaimah, United Arab Emirates

Saih Al Harf is an archaeological site in the northern part of the emirate of Ras Al Khaimah, United Arab Emirates, dating to the Wadi Suq period (c. 2000–1300 BCE).

== Discovery and excavation ==
The site was first identified by British archaeologists in the late 1980s. In 1999 the ruler of Ras Al Khaimah, Sheikh Saqr bin Mohammed Al Qasimi, called for the preservation of the emirate's archaeological sites, and in 2004 an order was issued for the preservation of Saih Al Harf. The site was nonetheless threatened by the northern extension of the E611 (Emirates Road); although proposals were made to reroute the highway to spare it, the road project went ahead. In the spring of 2013 a team from Durham University led by Derek Kennet excavated the site.

== Description and finds ==
Saih Al Harf comprises a series of about 50 burial sites. Two were directly threatened by the road works: an 18-metre horseshoe-shaped tomb and a W-shaped tomb, both of which were communal graves. Around 10,000 artefacts have been recovered, including numerous spearheads and arrowheads, razor blades, jewellery (among them carnelian beads), knives, and vessels of soft stone and pottery. One of the finds was the skeleton of a woman still wearing bracelets on her forearm.

== See also ==
- Archaeology of the United Arab Emirates
- Wadi Suq culture
