= Tell Abraq =

Archaeological site in the UAE

- Location within United Arab Emirates
- 25°29′16″N 55°33′07″E
- Type: settlement
- Periods: Bronze Age, Iron Age
- Cultures: Umm Al Nar culture

History
- Built: 2nd millennium BC

Site notes
- Excavation dates: 1989-1998, 2007-present
- Archaeologists: Daniel Potts, Peter Magee, M. Degli Esposti
- Condition: Ruined
- Owner: Public
- Public access: Yes

Tell Abraq (Til Abrook) was an ancient Near Eastern city. Located on the border between Sharjah and Umm Al Quwain in the United Arab Emirates about 50 kilometers north-east of Dubai, the city was originally on the coastline of the Persian Gulf but changing sea levels have placed the remains of the city inland. It is located on the main road from Umm Al Quwain to Falaj Al Mualla.

The mound containing the ruins of Tell Abraq was originally excavated by a team from the University of Copenhagen working on the extensive remains of the city of Ed-Dur, a few kilometres to the north. Their original intention was to confirm the time sequence prior to Ed-Dur's primacy, around 1000 BC. However, they were surprised to find extensive indications of much earlier settlement, dating back to the Umm Al Nar period, including a 3rd millennium monumental fortification.

Tell Abraq has been cited as being the "best preserved and largest prehistoric settlement in the Lower Gulf" and is thought to be one of the key locations of the area the Sumerians knew as 'Magan'.

== History ==
Finds at Tell Abraq show human occupation through the Umm Al Nar, Wadi Suq and Iron Age periods, from approximately 2200 BC to 200 AD. At the core of the settlement lies a large circular fortification built out of mud brick and faced with stone, some 40 meters in diameter and eight metres high and constructed c. 2200 BC. A stone lined well in the center of the tower ran down to the water table. This has been preserved by a late 2nd millennium BC mud platform, built over the fortification. It is the largest of the distinctive Umm Al Nar fortress towers to be excavated in the UAE. As well as a collection of Umm Al Nar buildings and fireplaces, mud brick buildings dating from the second and early first millennium were found.

The 6 meter diameter Umm Al Nar tomb with two internal chambers and a removal flat stone doorway, located 10 meters west of the tower and made of limestone ashlar blocks and beach stone, contained the mostly dis-articulated co-mingled remains of some 410 individuals (276 adult). Analysis of the human remains have shown evidence that individuals suffering illness and limited mobility were cared for, pointing to a developed society which was sufficiently secure and prosperous to be able to afford compassion. One of the individuals, a woman in her twenties, was found to be suffering from polio, thought to be the earliest dated instance of the disease in human history. Grave goods found included "ceramic and stone vessels, copper and bronze rings, spearheads, ostrich eggshell fragments, beads, and infant feeding shells". The tomb dated to the late 3rd millennium (2200-2000 BC). The subadults included a number of pre-term infants, neonates, and infants under two years of age. Charcoal samples in the tomb were radiocarbon dated to 2197-2036 B.C, calibrated with CALIB 3.0.3c.

As with Ed-Dur, there is evidence of extensive trade links between the people of Tell Abraq and Mesopotamia, Iran and the Indus Valley. Finds include two Harappan cubical weights, distinctive Harappan carnelian and agate jewellery and an ivory duck figurine, and tin and ivory from Afghanistan. An ivory comb and pottery found at the site has been linked through its decorative form to Bactria. There is evidence that bronze was both refined and cast at the site.

Some 600 sherds of red-ridged Barbar pottery at Tel Abraq show distinct links to Umm Al Nar island and also ancient 'Tilmun', or Bahrain.

Tell Abraq boasts the largest collection of faunal remains uncovered on any archaeological site within the Arabian Peninsula. Domesticated animals such as sheep, goats and cattle were reared, while locally available wild animals such as gazelle and oryx were hunted. Fish and shellfish as well as turtles and dugongs from the Persian Gulf were eaten extensively. Digs have uncovered over 100,000 animal bone remains.

Both Tell Abraq and Shimal and Seih Al Harf in Ras Al Khaimah show a continuation from the Umm Al Nar to Wadi Suq periods, although Shimal has yielded a preponderance of the distinctive Wadi Suq burials. The tower at Tell Abraq continued to be occupied throughout this period, with evidence of a changing lifestyle among its occupants and more dependence on seafood. Further possible links between these two communities (through Ed-Dur) is provided by Iron Age pottery finds at Tell Abraq, which include similar artefacts to those found at Shimal.

== Archaeology ==
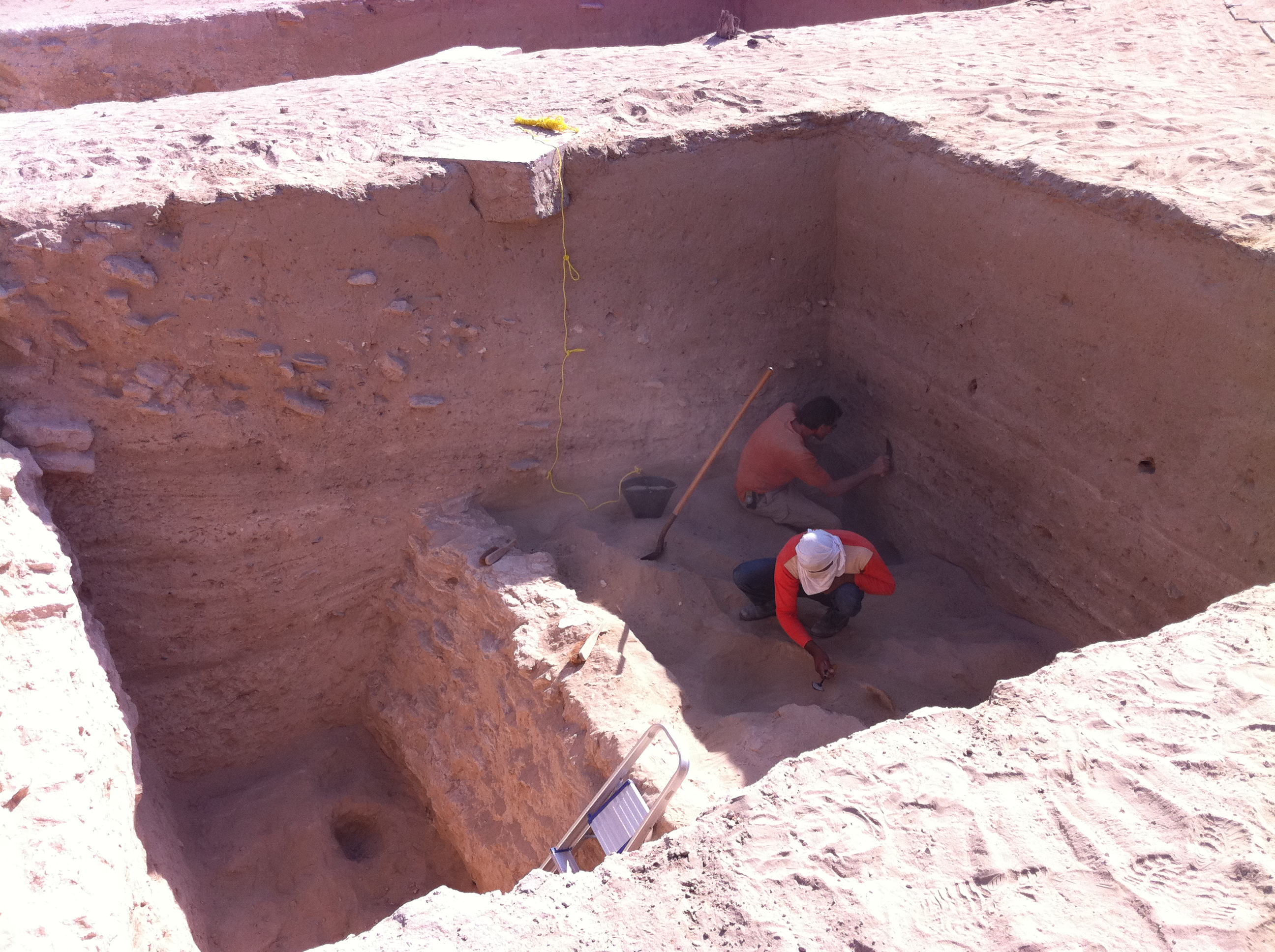
حفريات في تل ابرق

The mound comprises an area of some four hectares and rises to a height of some ten meters above the surrounding sabkha, or salt flats. As the site is divided by a border, excavations of the east and west areas are generally independent efforts.

Limited trenching was undertaken by an Iraqi team led by Sayid Rabi' al-Qaisi in 1973, of which there are no records. The site was excavated in 5 seasons between 1989 and 1998 by a team from the University of Copenhagen in Denmark led by Daniel Potts. Work was resumed in 2007 by a joint team from the Bryn Mawr College and the University of Tübingen led by Peter Magee. Initially principally involved in cataloging the existing site, in 2010 large scale excavations were undertaken. Beginning in 2019 the Italian Archaeological Mission in Umm al‐Quwain effort has been led by M. Degli Esposti. The portion of the site worked by the current excavation has come from later periods, from late Bronze Age up to Iron Age III.

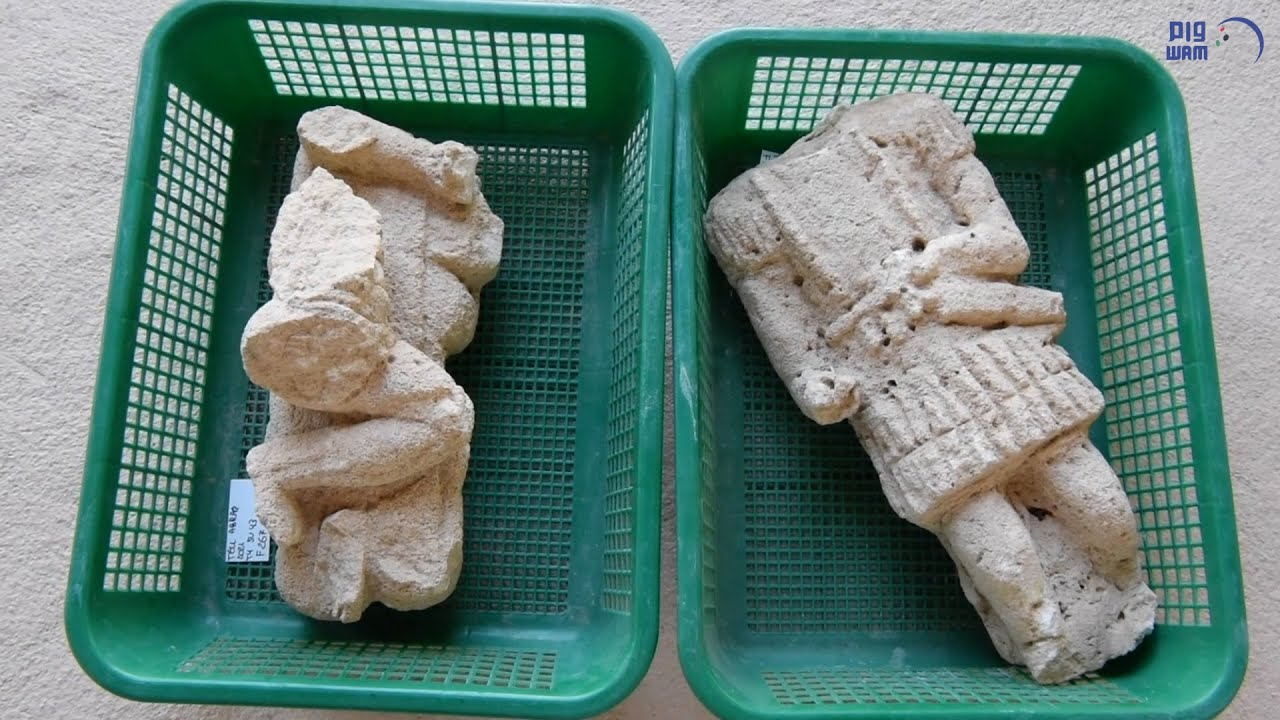
Two Hellenistic or Parthian style statues found at the Tell Abraq site from the 3rd Century BCE

A charcoal sample from the base area of the Umm Al Nar fortress tower provided a radiocarbon date of 2461–2199 BC (C14 date 3840±40 BP). It was calibrated with IntCal13. Finds from Tell Abraq have been crucial in the division of the Iron Age I (1200-1000 BC), II (1000-500 BC) and III (500-300 BC) periods in the UAE. Twenty one 2nd millennium BC bitumen samples, some attached to Mesopotamian and to local pottery, were subjected to geochemical analysis. Their origin was determined to be in Elamite lands, unlike the Mesopotamian origin for bitumen in most regional sites. Four complete or fragmentary copper-alloy figurines, one of a naked anatomically correct man, dated between 300BC and 300AD were excavated at the site. A few cylinder seals were excavated at the site. Two were heavily damaged but one copper-alloy seal featured the image of a Zebu, one stone seal bore geometric patterns and one stone seal had an apparent "sacred tree" image. Two pottery items with seals were also found.

== See also ==
- List of Ancient Settlements in the UAE
- Archaeology of the United Arab Emirates
- Cities of the ancient Near East
- Barbar Temple
