= Al Qurayyah =

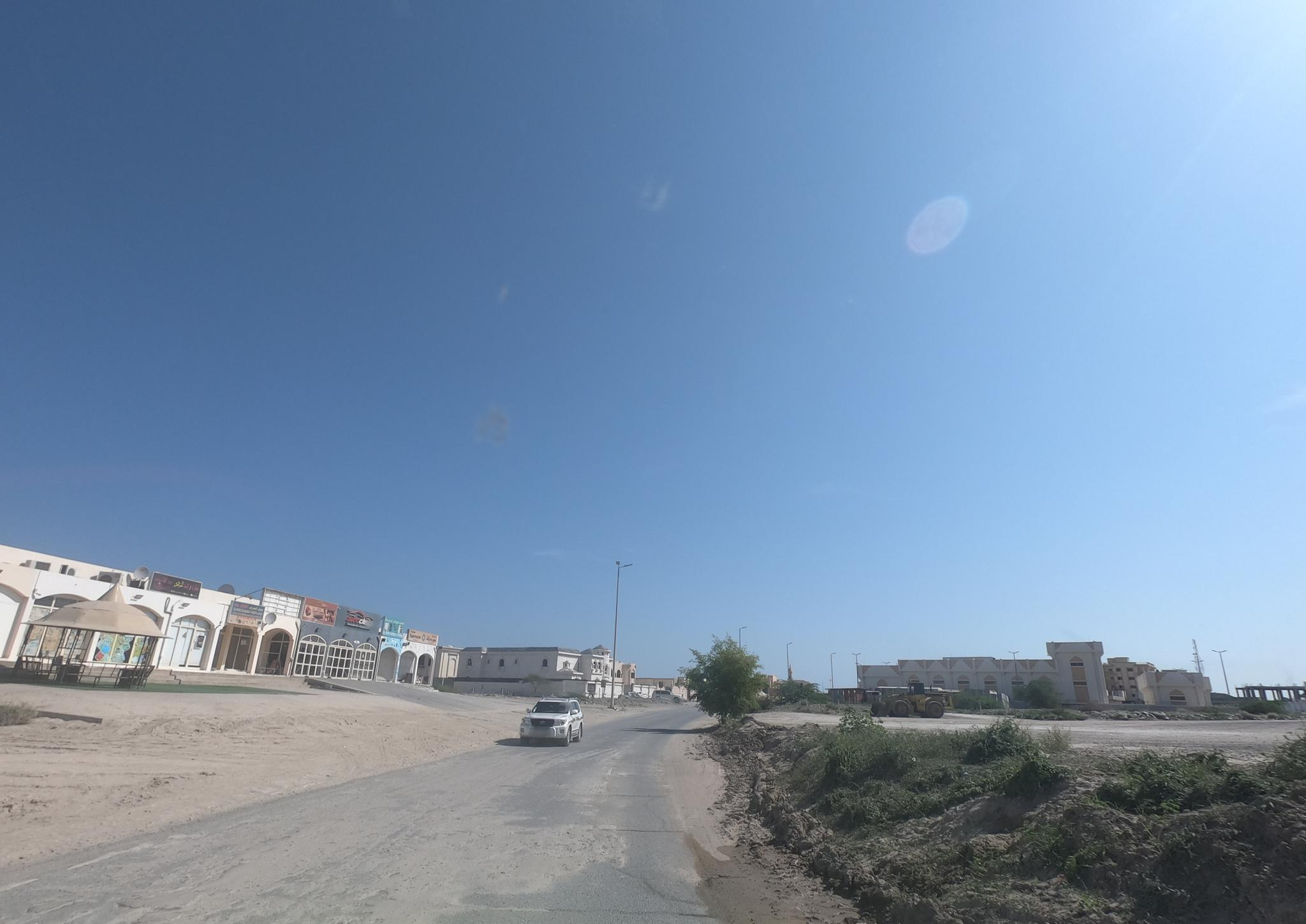
- View of shops in Al Qurayyah

- Location within United Arab Emirates
- Coordinates: 25°14′22″N 56°21′38″E
- Country: United Arab Emirates
- Emirate: (Emirate of Fujairah) Fujairah

Al Qurayyah is a village in the Emirate of Fujairah, in the United Arab Emirates, some 14km north of the city of Fujairah. It is associated with the Kaabi family. In 2016, construction work on a mosque revealed the existence of a Wadi Suq Period burial site, which has been preserved by the Fujairah Tourism and Antiquities Authority.
