= Al Ashoosh =

Archaeological site in the UAE

The archaeological site of Al Ashoosh is a third-millennium BC settlement located 70 km (43 mi) south of Dubai in the United Arab Emirates (UAE). It is an important example of inland desert occupation in the period following the Holocene Climatic Optimum period and of human occupation in the Rub' al Khali during the Umm Al Nar period.

Archaeologists believe Al Ashoosh was a seasonal settlement occupied by a hunter/pastoral community, probably occupying structures of perishable materials, during the second half of the third millennium BCE (2500—2000 BCE). It is thought the water table would have been higher, supporting inland settlement in what is now a plain and arid site with several brackish wells. The site was used for the production of stone tools.

The boundary between Dubai and Abu Dhabi was defined by the British as a line between Hassyan, today a power station, and Al Ashoosh. It was ratified in 1968.

== The site ==
Dubai Municipality and the Sanisera Archaeology Institute conducted excavations at the site between November 2015 and May 2016. The site was discovered during two seasons of survey in 2002–2003 following the discovery of the nearby Iron Age metallurgical centre Saruq Al Hadid, and is located 8 km (5.0 mi) from that site.

Surveys in the area by Dubai Municipality and the Department of Antiquities of Jordan identified 33 archaeological sites ranging in date from prehistory to the late Islamic period. In 2006–2007, more-detailed archaeological investigations of the area of Al Ashoosh were conducted, including survey, excavation and geological sampling.

The site of Al Ashoosh covers some 1.3 hectares (3.2 acres) and comprises a fenced area of low dunes surrounding a large tell, or mound, 1.5–2m in height. The site is divided into two distinct parts, dubbed areas A and B. Area A, the main area, covers some 350m² and represents a single-phase rubbish midden located on a natural sand dune. It has yielded a large amount of material including faunal remains, lithics, charcoal and a small quantity of pottery. There is no evidence of any structure at the site. Carbon dating of recovered materials dates the site to the Umm Al Nar period.

50m to the southwest, Area B has revealed eight ovens, constructed of irregular clay rings sloping down to bases of the structures that sit directly on the bedrock. These are thought to be a type of tannour. Almost 300kg of faunal remains were recovered during digs at Al Ashoosh.

Finds at the site include unusual seals with links to Dilmun, stone tools and pottery of the black-on-red Umm Al Nar type. A steatite seal depicting two men drinking was dated to 2050–2000 BCE and is unique, the only similar seal found in the Persian Gulf region was at the site of Tell Abraq on the border of Sharjah and Umm Al Quwain.

== See also ==
- List of Ancient Settlements in the UAE
