= Shimal =

- Location within United Arab Emirates
- Coordinates: 25°49′5″N 56°1′54″E
- Country: United Arab Emirates
- Emirate: Ras Al Khaimah
- Elevation: 134 m (440 ft)

Population (2023)
  - Total: 9,314

Shimal is a settlement in Ras Al Khaimah, United Arab Emirates. It is associated with the Shihuh tribe of the Northern UAE and Oman and with the foundation of the Islamic era port of Julfar, and was once the seat of the Ruler of Julfar. It is also the location of an important archaeological site dating back to the Umm Al Nar culture (2600–2000 BC).

== Archaeology ==
Tombs excavated and surveyed at Shimal include both the round Umm Al Nar type and the barrow tombs typical of the Wadi Suq era. Grave goods found at Shimal have included large finds of pottery as well as beads and objects providing a link to the Harappan Indus Valley Civilisation.

The burial grounds at Shimal consist of at least 250 graves, some of which have been found to encompass over 300 burials. Many of the tombs were re-used. The nearby site of Seih Al Harf mirrors many of the finds at Shimal.

The excavations at Shimal, principally those of the mid-1980s by a team from the University of Göttingen in Germany, are significant as they provided early evidence of the Wadi Suq period, including finds of pottery, soft-stone vessels, bronze and copper weapons and beads which came to be regarded as typical of the period c. 2000–1300 BC in the UAE.

== Sheba's Palace ==
Shimal Fort, known locally as "Sheba's Palace", is an Islamic era fortification connected with the town wall of nearby Julfar, the Islamic era trading port and settlement. It was thought to have been the seat of the Ruler of Julfar. The Wadi Sur town wall, running some 7km from the lagoon to the south of present-day Ras Al Khaimah to the mountains, was a 4–5m high defensive structure with watchtowers placed every 150 metres. The fort consists of a long rectangular structure located on a plateau overlooking the plain and settlement of Kush and, latterly, Julfar. It has been dated to the 11th century, contemporaneous with the construction of the wall and the growth of Julfar as an important port, with Kush as its administrative centre. In the 13th century, Kush was abandoned as the coastal area of Al Mataf flowered when Julfar became a tributary of the Kingdom of Hormuz.

The town wall continued to be an important fortification until its collapse in the mid-18th century, while Sheba's Palace was relegated to the role of refuge fortification (a role also performed by the fort of Dhayah to the North of Shimal, where the final surrender of the Qawasim to the British took place in 1819).

== See also ==
- List of ancient settlements in the UAE
- Archaeology of the United Arab Emirates
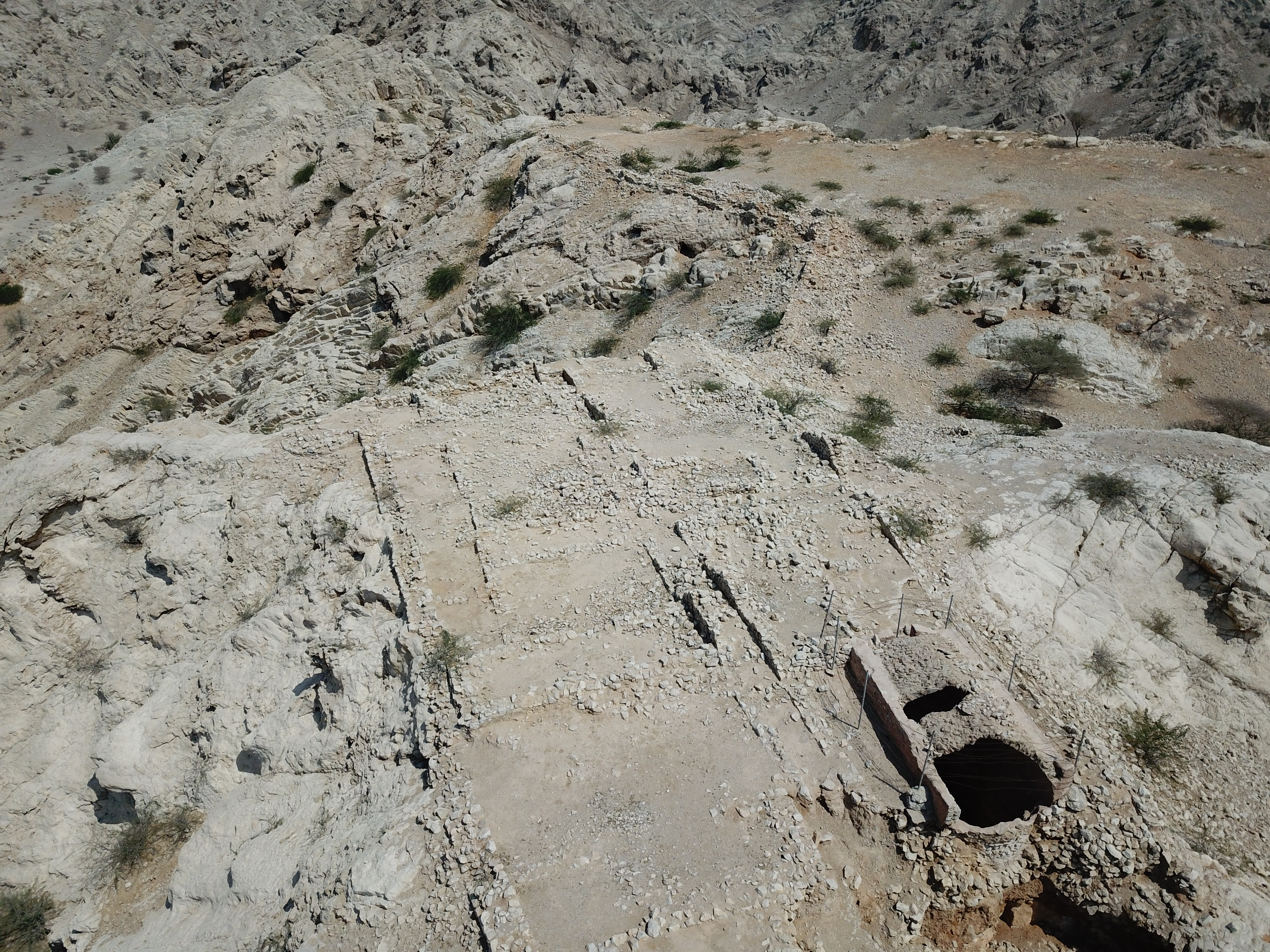
  Shimal Fort, also known locally as 'Sheba's Palace'.

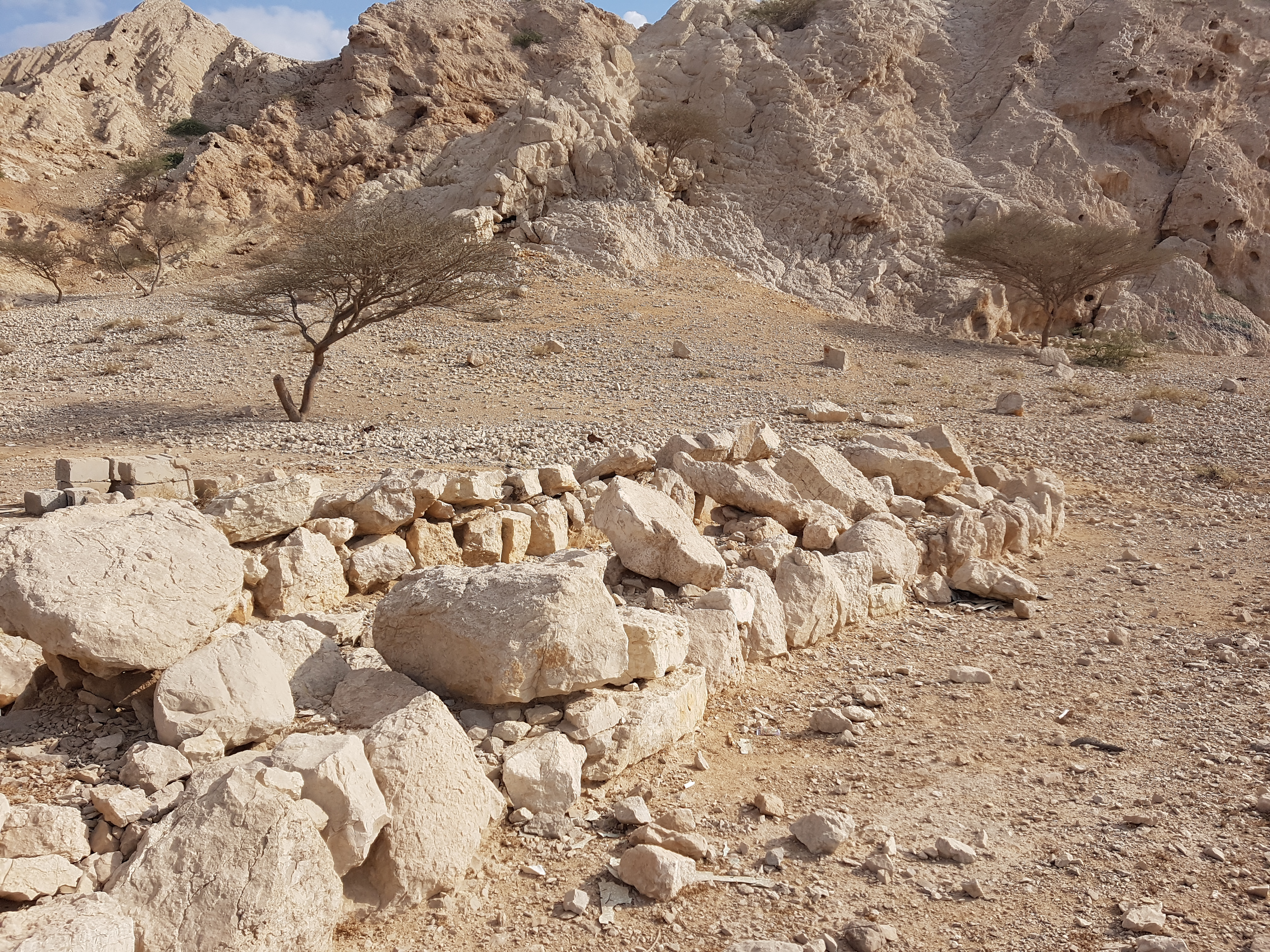
Wadi Suq era burial at Shimal, UAE
