= Ghagha Island =

Island in Abu Dhabi

Native name: جزيرة غاغا
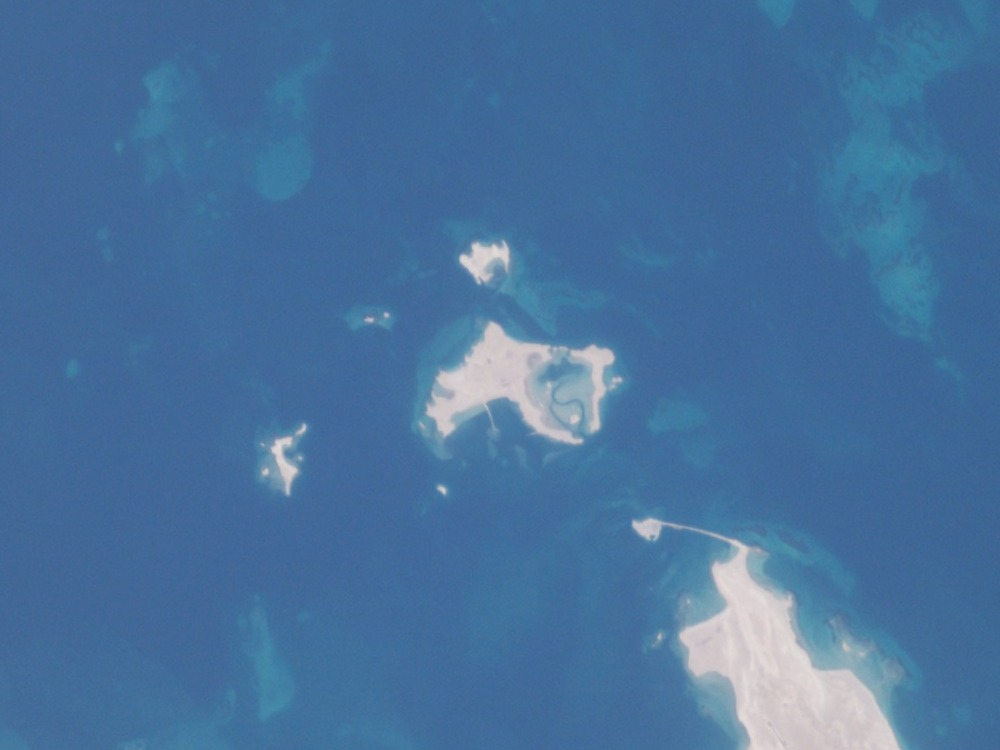
- Ghagha seen from the ISS
- Interactive map of Ghagha Island

Geography
- Location: Abu Dhabi
- Coordinates: 24°24′51″N 51°32′56″E
- Area: 5 km^{2} (1.9 sq mi)
- Length: 2.6 km (1.62 mi)

Administration
- United Arab Emirates

Ghagha Island (Arabic: جزيرة غاغا) is an island in the Emirate of Abu Dhabi. It is located 306 km away from Abu Dhabi, and its area is 5 km^{2}. The island is connected to the mainland through a bridge connecting it to Ras Ghumais. The waterway is around 2.6 km long.

Historically, the island had freshwater sources, was inhabited, and its residents drank from its waters.

== Location ==
The island is located 306 km west of Abu Dhabi, 81 km south, 6 km northwest of Jebel Ghumais, 4.3 km northwest of Ghumeighem Island, 48 km north, a bit to the west, Tuwi As-Sil', 25 west Qaffay Island, and 117 west Jebel Al-Dhannah.

== Important Bird Area ==
The island has been designated an Important Bird Area (IBA) by BirdLife International because it supports breeding Socotra cormorants and Saunders's terns.
