= Wadi Sur =

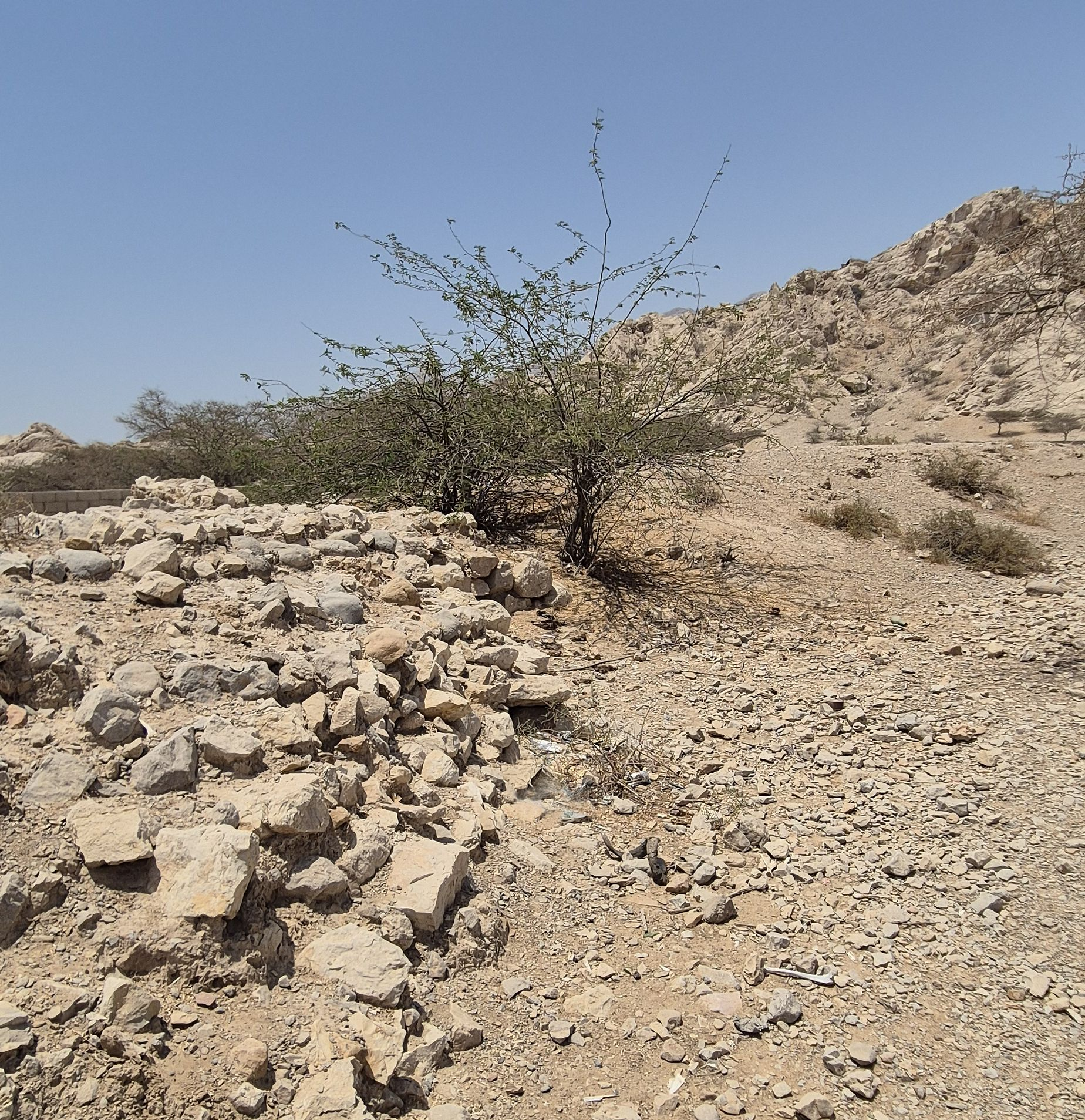
Remains of the Wadi Sur defensive wall at the foothills of the Hajar Mountains, overlooked by Shimal Fort, AKA 'Sheba's Palace'.

Wadi Sur is the former defensive town wall of the settlements of Julfar and Ras Al Khaimah and is the largest historical fortification in the United Arab Emirates. It has been called one of the largest fortifications in Southeastern Arabia.

== Defence ==
A 7 km long defensive structure, Wadi Sur stretches from the site of Shimal Fort (known locally as Sheba's Palace) in a straight line to the coast. The wall has been estimated to originally stand at a height of five metres with a ditch, stone-lined mudbrick wall and rampart, and to have been two metres thick. Some 45 towers are constructed along the entire length of the wall at 150 metre intervals with the sole exception of one length of wall, since destroyed by water erosion in a wadi bed, which has an irregular 'gap' of 60 metres. It has been postulated this would originally have been an entrance, with the dual purpose of admitting visitors and also allowing the wadi waters to pass through at times of spate.

Creating a defensive barrier between the sea by the modern Ras Al Khaimah suburb of Al Uraibi and the Hajar Mountains, the wall likely protected both the ports, oasis settlements and agricultural hinterland of Julfar and its successor settlement Ras Al Khaimah. It consisted of a 3.5 metre wide and 2.5 metre deep ditch, with a rampart and wall forming the 5 metre high defensive structure. The date of its construction is uncertain and has been variously estimated as being concurrent with the construction of Shimal Fort in the 11th century and as being constructed during the 'Hormuzi boom' at Julfar in the 14th centuries. The wide spread of potential construction dates of both the Wadi Sur and Sheba's Palace has been referred to as an "uncomfortably wide degree of interpretative latitude" by academics.

Shimal Fort appears to have been abandoned in the 16th century, possibly after direct rule from Hormuz was imposed on Julfar in 1520 following an attempt at rebellion against Hormuz by Lar and Julfar in 1499 and 1508.

== Archaeology ==
Wadi Sur was first surveyed by British archaeologist Beatrice de Cardi in 1968. De Cardi postulated the wall was intended as a dam to divert flood waters from Wadi Bih away from the plantations and date groves to its north, which comprised something like 85% of Julfar's agricultural hinterland. This theory was eclipsed with the discovery of watchtowers during a survey of the wall in 2003. A limited exploration of the portion of the wall at the foot of Shimal Fort was undertaken by a German team in 1994, which found a 15th-century ceramic sherd. Although much of the original wall has been destroyed by the construction of modern houses and roads, erosion or incorporated into more recent buildings, significant portions survive.
