= Julfar =

City and trading port

Julfar (Arabic: جلفار) was an Islamic-era port, trading entrepôt and settlement, which formed a key element in the Arab trading networks that straddled East and West throughout the Islamic period until they were overrun by the Portuguese in the 16th century.

It was a predecessor settlement to Ras Al Khaimah, today in the United Arab Emirates, and, although often conflated with the 17th-century emergence of the modern city of Ras Al Khaimah, represents a distinct era of human settlement and development from that of the modern city. Julfar's rise, efflorescence and fall took place between 1300 and 1650 CE.

== Foundation and early years ==
Julfar's predecessor settlement was the fortified port of Kush, established in the 5th century and finally abandoned in the 13th century. Once enjoying protected maritime access thanks to its lagoon, the waterway to Kush silted up leading to the establishment of Julfar on the coast. This process of abandonment was gradual and Kush remained a key administrative and commercial centre even as Julfar was established.

The medieval port of Julfar was settled at Mataf and Nudud between the 13th and 17th centuries AD. The two centres are situated on two sandbanks protecting a lagoon southwest of the palm gardens (Mataf to the north, Nudud to the south). Archaeological excavations recorded areesh structures built from palm fronds in the lowest levels, before mud brick and stone buildings appeared by the end of the 14th century. It is now considered likely that Nudud was settled before Mataf, before being briefly abandoned in the 14th century and then re-occupied with the subsequent expansion of Mataf.

The foundation of Julfar has been dated to the early-mid 14th century, as a small and basic settlement of palm frond huts that subsequently expanded during the 15th and 16th centuries into a town of considerable importance. The early population fished and likely pearled, but also farmed the interior, benefiting from the same access to land and sea that had characterised Julfar's predecessor, Kush. Sequences of occupation at Julfar include finds of early Chinese porcelain dated to the 14th century, post holes and ovens and then the development of mud brick buildings and defined streets, courtyard houses and evidence of dense occupation as the town developed into the 15th century.

Sheikh Dr Sultan bin Muhammad Al Qasimi, the current ruler of the Emirate Of Sharjah and a prominent historian, has claimed that the historical city of Julfar was founded by Armenians who fled Persia during the Mongol invasion.

Julfar was protected on its three landward sides by a city wall, some 1.5 metres thick. The whole area of plantation to the hinterland of the town – something like 85% of the arable land available to the town – was protected by the Wadi Sur, a 7 km wall between the shore and the mountains interspersed with watchtowers at regular intervals and terminating at the 11th-century Shimal Fort (also known locally as 'Sheba's Palace'). The 5-metre high and 2-metre thick Wadi Sur wall and its 2.5-metre deep and 3.5-metre wide ditch were likely constructed in the 14th century.

Associated with the emergence of Julfar as a trading centre, but also evidenced at Kush and other inland sites, Julfar ware pottery is a coarse ceramic manufactured at a number of sites inland of Julfar. It has been widely found in the Gulf and Western Indian Ocean, a testament to strong regional trade.

== Development ==
Significant excavations of a mosque at Julfar have taken place, supporting a view of several phases of the town's development, from its establishment in the 14th century through periods of growth into the 16th century, when the mosque underwent a number of expansions as a mud brick building and then an extensive reconstruction in stone and mortar. Finds support the peak of Julfar's growth and development to sit between the early 15th and early 16th centuries, with the emergence of considerable – and apparently planned – urban development. At this stage, Julfar was a well-defined urban settlement of some scale with a large mosque, a fort, a town wall and a dense network of streets packed with mudbrick, stone and coral houses. These buildings are believed to have housed a 16th-century population of anything up to 70,000 people and to have stretched 5 kilometres along the coast north of Mataf, with the town stretching as far north as Rams.

Julfar's development as a major trading centre has been linked to the emergence of Hormuz in the 14th and 15th centuries. The 'Hormuzi boom' of the time followed the occupation of the island of Jarun in the Strait of Hormuz by Mahmud Qalhati and his people and its subsequent emergence as a global trading hub. Hormuz was entirely without sweet water and largely without food production resources and it is likely that Julfar provided pearls, food and water to meet demand at Hormuz, a fact that led to the extensive agricultural development of the areas inland of Julfar. The abundance of coinage found at Julfar dating to this period also supports the idea of a period of intense and lucrative regional trade. Situated to the north of the Gulf's extensive pearl banks, Julfar as a centre for the export of pearls would also be linked to its role as a regional centre of trade between the mainland and Hormuz. Direct Hormuzi control over Julfar was likely exercised in the 1520s and the Hormuzis are credited with the construction of the stone mosque.

Julfar is mentioned by Portuguese explorer Duarte Barbosa as a major entrepôt, and Barbosa (writing in 1518) also mentions Julfar's successor settlement, Ras Al Khaimah – evidence of a period of contiguity: "Passing above this place Profam [Khor Fakkan], we come to another called Julfar, where dwell persons of worth, great navigators and wholesale dealers. Here is a very great fishery as well of seed-pearls as of large pearls, and the Moors of Ormus come hither to buy them and carry them to India and many other lands. The trade of this place brings in a great revenue to the King of Ormus … Beyond these Profam villages are others along the coast, one of which is a large place called Reçoyma [Ras al-Khaimah]."

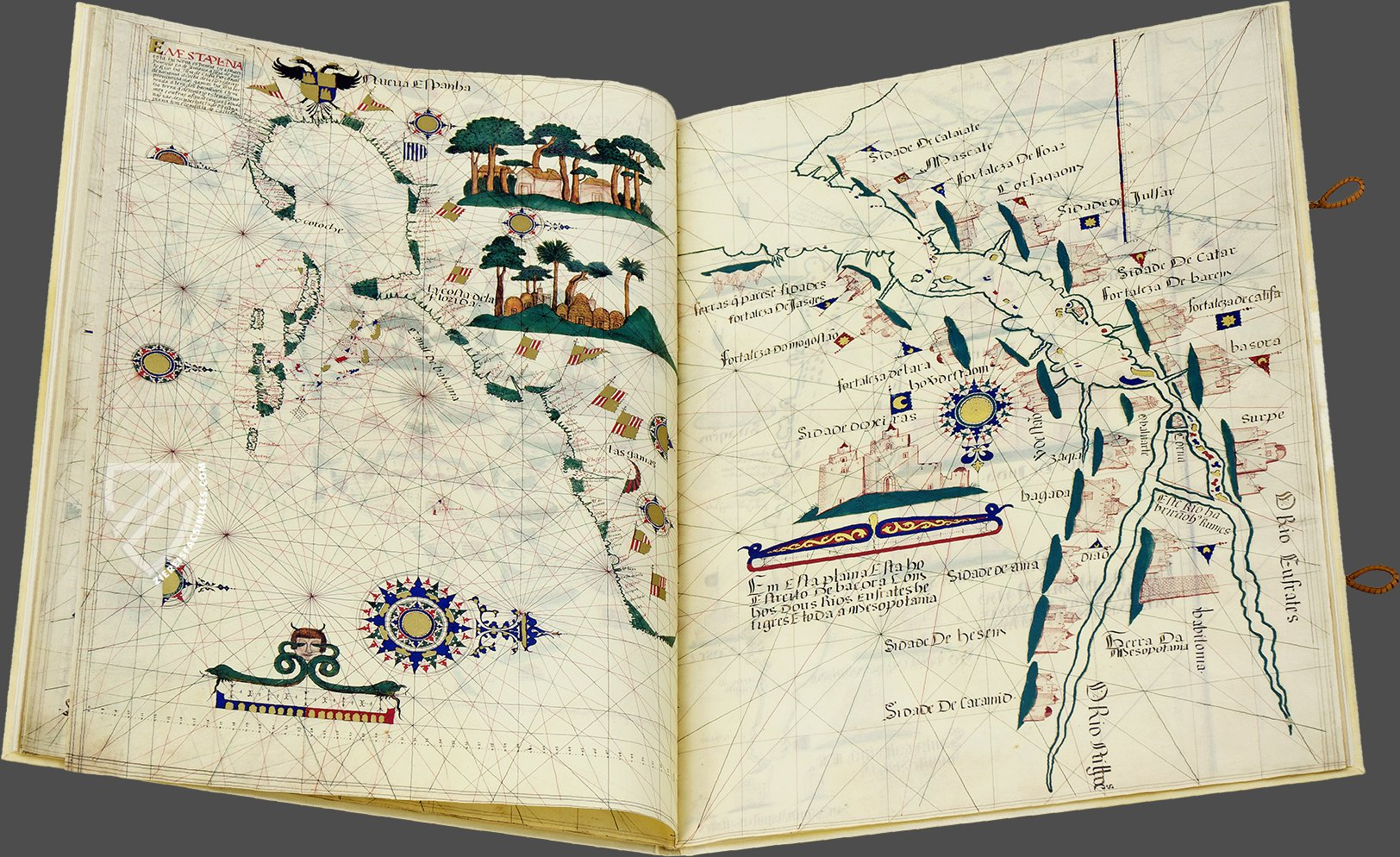
Sidade de Julfar in Lázaro Luís' 1563 map of Arabia

Other travellers mentioning Julfar at this time included the Portuguese explorer Pedro Álvares Cabral and Italian traveller Ludovico di Varthema.

Julfar's prominent role in the region's pearl trade was by now so great that Portuguese conquistador Pedro Texeira postulated the origin of the Portuguese word for pearl, aljofar, originated with the name Al Julfar.

Julfar was the birthplace of celebrated seafarer, navigator and cartographer Ahmad ibn Majid, the 'Lion of the Sea', in 1432 – a time that corresponds with the town's emergence as a major maritime and mercantile hub.

== Decline and abandonment ==
It is at this point that evidence emerges for a decline in Julfar's importance and population, leading to its abandonment in the late 16th century, including a lack of pottery finds of Chinese blue and white porcelain that can be securely dated to a post-1575 period. This dating is also supported by a lack of Chinese Swatow ware at Al Mataf, but finds of that style of porcelain in Ras Al Khaimah to the south. Swatow dates to the late 16th century, suggesting the abandonment of Julfar and a movement of the population and trade of Julfar to the town of Ras Al Khaimah emerging as a new centre to the south. A decline in imported porcelain, as well as locally made 'Julfar ware' pottery supports the 16th-century decline of Julfar as a trading entrepôt and also as a settlement.

However, more recent research pushes this date back to a period of decline following Persian and Omani incursions into Julfar in 1633. The Portuguese may well have delivered the last blow when they invaded Rams and then sacked Julfar in 1621 - and the fort they constructed wasn't to last, when it fell to the invasion of Julfar by the first Omani Yaruba imam, Nasir bin Murshid. It was likely this invasion that led to the abandonment of Al Mataf and Al Nudood in favour of the southern development of Ras Al Khaimah.

The dissonance between contemporary written sources and the archaeology at Julfar has been reconciled by historians postulating that the name Julfar persisted during the emergence of Ras Al Khaimah as an alternative settlement, acquiring its new name over time as Julfar was wholly abandoned. However, Julfar's abandonment in favour of settlement in nearby Ras Al Khaimah would likely have been almost total by the time the Portuguese arrived.

The abandonment of Julfar and emergence of Ras Al Khaimah took place at a time when Hormuz and the Arab eastern trade network had fallen to the Portuguese and then the Portuguese in turn had faced competition from the Ottomans, Persians, the Dutch, English and French. It was to lead to the emergence of new powers in the Persian Gulf, not least of which would be the Qawasim of Ras Al Khaimah and Sharjah, ranged against the English and their ally, the sultan of Muscat.

== Archaeology ==
The potential existence of a site at Julfar was first outlined by British archaeologist Beatrice di Cardi in 1968 during an extensive survey of Ras Al Khaimah that also identified the sites at Khatt and Kush. Di Cardi noted an area of the coast littered with Ming-era porcelain and other pottery. The first excavations took place at Al Nudud in 1973/4 by an Iraqi team, with a subsequent investigation carried out in 1977/8 by John Hansman, who published his discoveries in Julfar – An Arabian Port. A number of excavations then took place between 1988 and 1994 that not only established Julfar as a major trading entrepôt but also as one of the most excavated sites in the Gulf. These digs, organised by the Ras Al Khaimah Department of Antiquities and Museums, brought in teams from the United Kingdom, France, Germany and Japan.
