= Seih Al Harf =

Seih Al Harf is an archaeological site in Northern Ras Al Khaimah, in the United Arab Emirates (UAE), dating back to the Wadi Suq period (2000–1300 BCE).

== Discovery and excavation ==
The site was first discovered in the late 1980s by British archaeologists and was put under a preservation order by the ruler of Ras Al Khaimah in 2004 (His father, the late Shaikh Saqr Bin Mohammad Al Qasimi had previously, in 1999, called for all archaeological sites in the emirate to be preserved). Although the site was seen to be threatened by the development of the northern extension of the arterial Emirates Road (E611), with proposals tabled to amend the road development to avoid damage to the site, the road project went ahead.

Seih Al Harf was excavated by a team from the University of Durham, led by Derek Kennet, in the spring of 2013. The site comprises a series of 50 burial sites, of which two were directly threatened by the road development, an 18-metre horseshoe shaped and a W-shaped tomb. Both were collective graves. Ten other excavated features were also impacted by the road development.

The 2013 dig excavated three monumental graves, six smaller collective tombs and a number of smaller burials. The three monumental tombs were all stone-built, corbelled structures and stand as some of the largest tombs from the Wadi Suq period found in Ras Al Khaimah. While most of the graves found were dated to late in this period, one of the tombs was identified as transitional from the earlier Umm Al Nar period (2600–2000 BCE). The area around Seih Al Harf is rich in finds of Wadi Suq era burials, in particular the nearby Shimal site, which contains both Umm Al Nar and Wadi Suq graves.

Included in some 10,000 artifacts removed from Seih Al Harf for research, the Durham team found a large variety of spearheads, arrowheads, razors, jewellery (including carnelian beads), blades, soft-stone and pottery vessels. One find included the skeleton of a woman found still wearing her bangles on her forearm.
