= Wadi Suq culture =

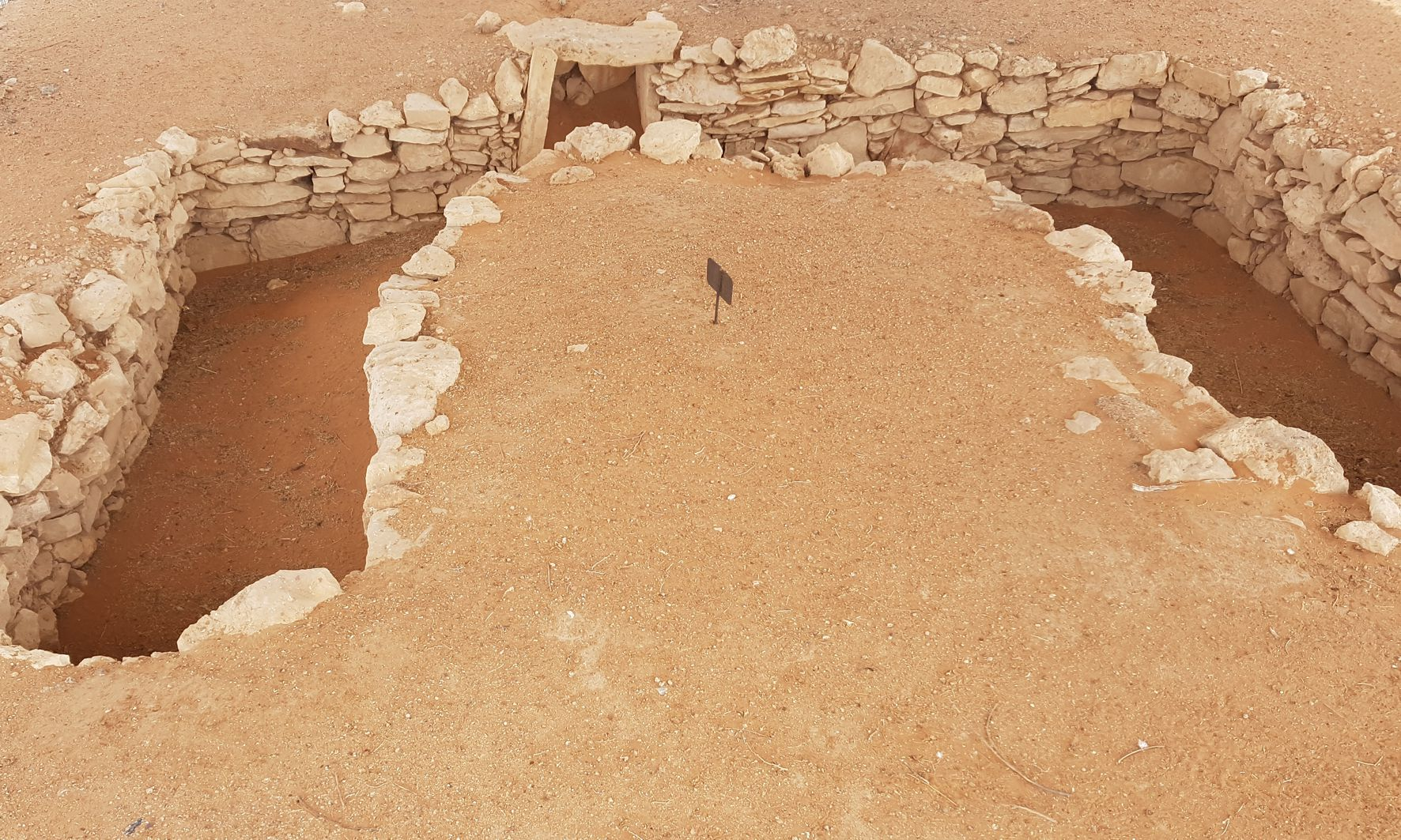
- Geographical range: Eastern Arabia
- Period: Bronze Age
- Dates: c. 2000 BC – 1300 BC
- Preceded by: Umm Al Nar culture

The Wadi Suq culture defines human settlement in the United Arab Emirates and Oman in the period from 2,000 to 1,300 BCE. It takes its name from a wadi, or seasonal watercourse, west of Sohar in Oman and follows on from the Umm Al Nar culture.

Although archaeologists have traditionally tended to view the differences in human settlements and burials between the Umm Al Nar and Wadi Suq periods as the result of major external disruption (climate change, the collapse of trade or threat of war), contemporary opinion has moved towards a gradual change in human society which is centred around more sophisticated approaches to animal husbandry as well as changes in the surrounding trade and social environments.

== History ==
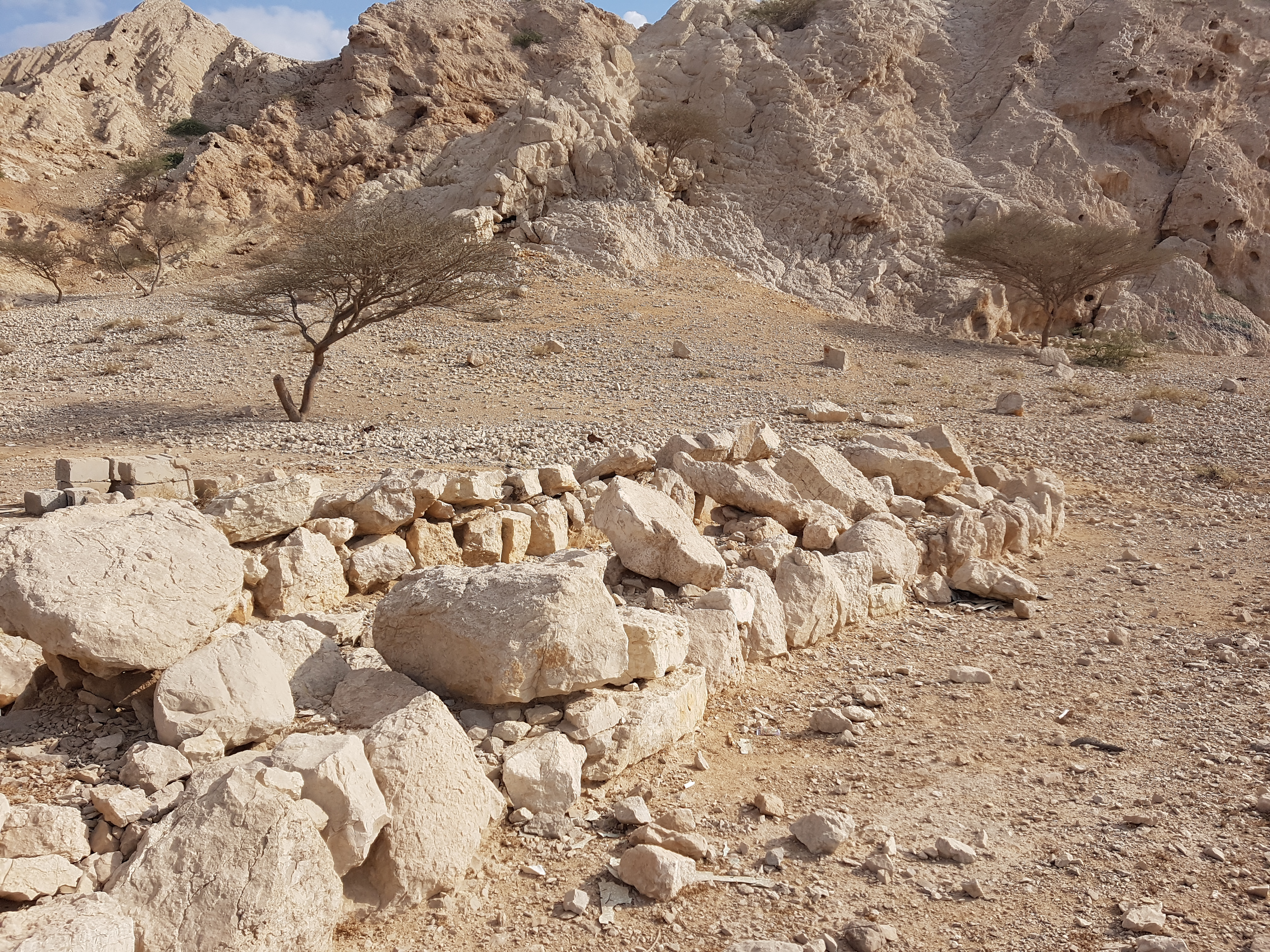
Wadi Suq burial at Shimal, near Ras Al Khaimah

The first discovery of Wadi Suq period burials was made by archaeologist Karen Frifelt of the University of Aarhus. Frifelt had previously defined the Hafit people as a distinctive and earlier cultural epoch to the Umm Al Nar people and had linked them to Sumer through the distinctive Jemdet Nasr pottery found in Hafit burials. Frifelt mapped, a field of some 400 graves in the Wadi Suq, inland of Sohar in Oman.

The transition between Umm Al Nar and Wadi Suq is thought to have taken some 200 years and more, with finds at the important Wadi Suq site of Tell Abraq in modern Umm Al Quwain showing evidence of the continuity of Umm Al Nar burials. One tomb in particular, found at Qarn Al Harf in Ras Al Khaimah, clearly shows signs of both Umm Al Nar and Wadi Suq influence.

Evidence of increased mobility among the population points to a gradual change in human habits rather than sudden change and important Wadi Suq era sites such as Tell Abraq, Ed Dur, Seih Al Harf, Shimal and Kalba show an increasing sophistication in copper and bronze ware as well as trade links both east to the Indus Valley and west to Mesopotamia. Wadi Suq era pottery is also seen as more refined and distinctive, with finds of painted ware common, as well as soft-stone vessels.

The Wadi Suq period saw focus move away from the great ports of the coast, such as Umm Al Nar and Tell Abraq, although there are Wadi Suq constructions on top of Umm Al Nar buildings at both locations. And while there are extensive burials in evidence, there is little built infrastructure in evidence. And although there is evidence for a decline in trading links, links to ‘Tilmun’ persist, with pottery finds in Bahrain attesting to a continuation at least in regional trade.

Studies of human remains from the period do point to a process of aridification taking place over the centuries contiguous between the Umm Al Nar and Wadi Suq periods, but do not support a sudden or cataclysmic movement or societal change rather a gradual shift in culture. This drop in the water table would have forced a movement of the human population towards the less arid areas around the Hajar Mountains, to the north and east, where wetter conditions prevailed and in fact – the mountains to the north, in Ras Al Khaimah and the east in Fujairah and Oman, dominate the map of known Wadi Suq burials.

The Wadi Suq people not only domesticated camels, but there is evidence they also planted crops of wheat, barley and dates.

== Burials ==
Some of the most obvious evidence of the change in human habits and society following the Umm Al Nar period can be found in the distinctive burials of the Wadi Suq people, notably in Shimal in Ras Al Khaimah where over 250 burial sites are located. In some cases, cut stone from Umm Al Nar burials has been used to build Wadi Suq graves. Wadi Suq burials are long chambers entered from the side and many have been found to have been used for subsequent burials. Although Shimal has the most extensive Wadi Suq burials, grave sites are to be found throughout the UAE and Oman and vary from simple barrows to sophisticated structures.

The notable Jebel Buhais burial ground, the oldest radiometrically dated burial site in the UAE, is an extensive necropolis, consisting of burial sites spanning the Stone, Bronze, Iron and Hellenistic ages of human settlement in the UAE. The widespread area of burials exhibits a number of important Wadi Suq tombs, including a unique clover-leaf shaped burial chamber, but has no evidence of Umm Al Nar era burials, although there are burials representing later eras. The clover-shaped Wadi Suq period tomb at Jebel Buhais, BHS 66 stands as a unique piece of funerary architecture in the UAE.

== Artefacts ==
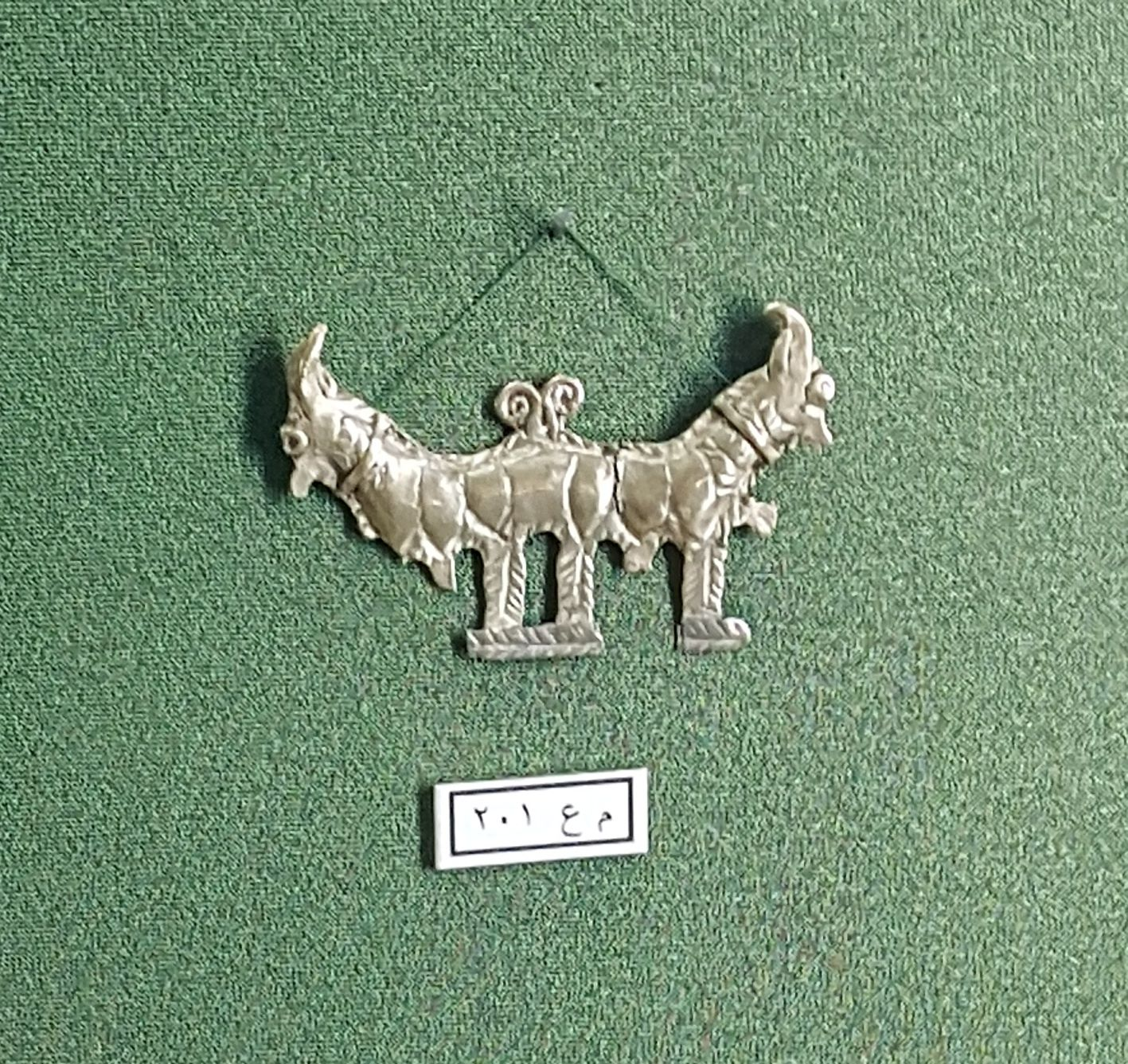
Wadi Suq electrum alloy plaque, found at Qattara Oasis, Al Ain.

Wadi Suq era weaponry shows a marked increase in sophistication, with an explosion in metallurgy taking place in the region. A number of tombs have been found with hundreds of weapons and other metal artefacts and long swords, bows and arrows became the predominant weapons. Long swords found at Qattara, Qidfa, Qusais and Bidaa bint Saud are double-edged and hilted. Light throwing spears also marked the weaponry of the time. Many of these weapons were cast in bronze. One grave excavated in Shimal had no fewer than 18 fine bronze arrowheads.

Another explosive growth industry in the Wadi Suq era was the production of soft-stone vessels. While in the preceding Umm Al Nar era these were distinctively decorated with dotted circles, they now gained incised patterns of lines and are found in profusion.

The relative wealth and growing metallurgical sophistication of the Wadi Suq people is displayed by finds of jewellery, including gold and electrum plaques depicting back to back animals. Ongoing links with both Dilmun and, vanishingly, the Indus Valley have been demonstrated.

== See also ==
- List of Ancient Settlements in the UAE
- Archaeology of the United Arab Emirates
