= Umm Al Nar culture =

Bronze Age culture located in the modern-day UAE

- Geographical range: Eastern Arabia
- Period: Early Bronze Age
- Dates: c. 2600 BCE – 2000 BCE
- Preceded by: Hafit culture
- Followed by: Wadi Suq culture

Umm Al Nar (Arabic: أُمّ الـنَّـار, romanized: Umm an-Nār or Umm al-Nar, lit. 'Mother of the Fire') is an Early Bronze Age, Prehistoric Arabian culture that existed around 2600–2000 BCE in the area of the modern-day United Arab Emirates and Oman. The etymology derives from the island of the same name which lies adjacent to the city of Abu Dhabi, the capital of the UAE, which provided early evidence and finds that came to define the period.

The Umm Al Nar people were important regional trading intermediaries between the ancient civilisations of Sumer in Mesopotamia and the Indus Valley Harappan culture. Known to the Sumerians as 'Magan', the area was the source of Sumer's copper and diorite as well as a trading entrepot for other goods from the Indus Valley, including carnelian jewellery.

== Location ==
Umm Al Nar Arabic: أُمّ الـنَّـار, romanized: Umm Al Nār "Mother of the Fire"
- Location within United Arab Emirates
- Coordinates: 24°26′18″N 54°30′52″E
- Country: United Arab Emirates
- Elevation: 5 m (16 ft)

The key site on the island, today known as Sas Al Nakhl, is protected, but its location between a refinery and a sensitive military area means public access is currently prohibited.

== Attributes ==
A key indicator of the Umm Al Nar culture is circular tombs typically characterized by well fitted ashlar in the outer wall and multiple human remains within. The tombs are frequently associated with towers, many of which were built around water sources.

== Excavations ==
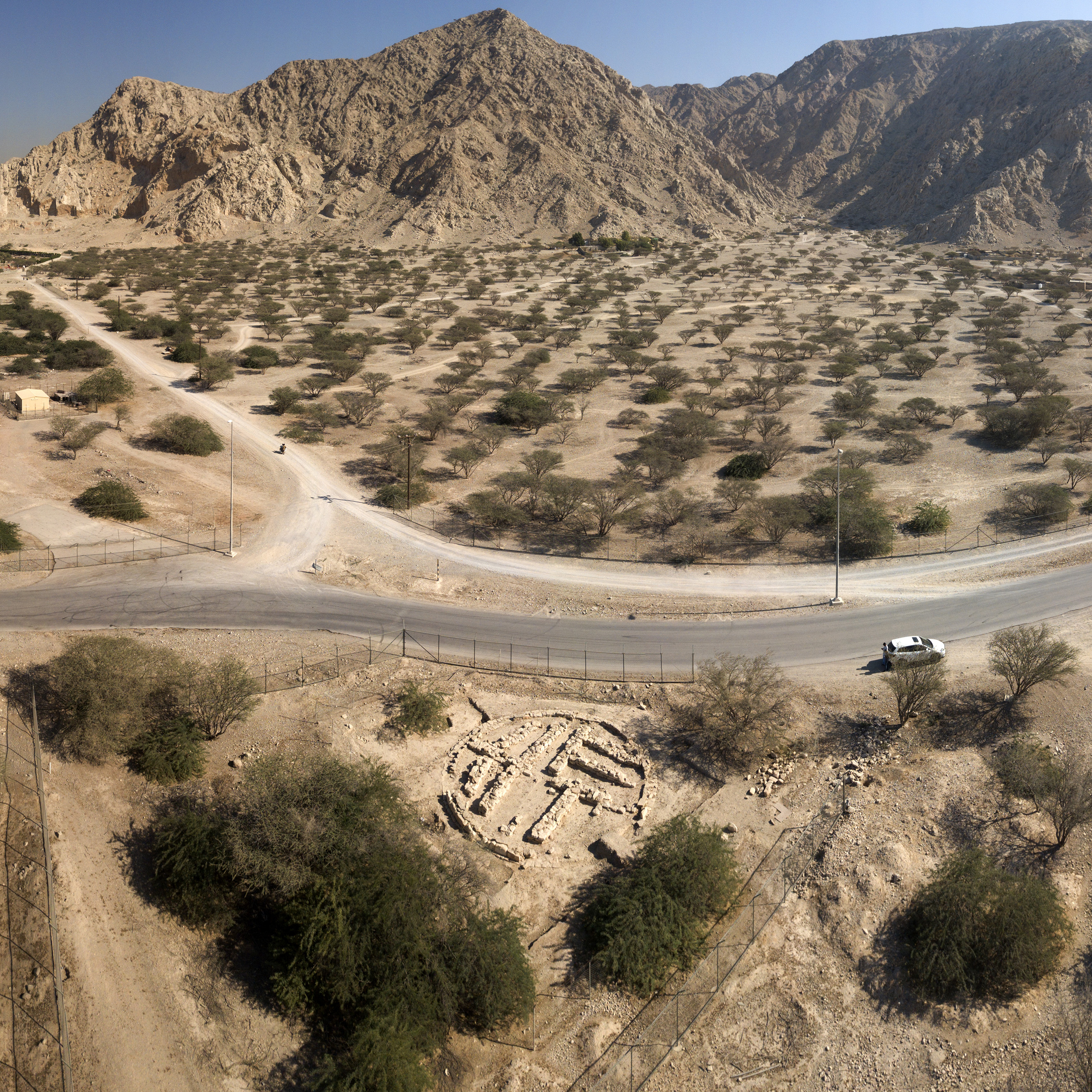
A tomb from the Umm Al Nar culture in Ras Al Khaimah

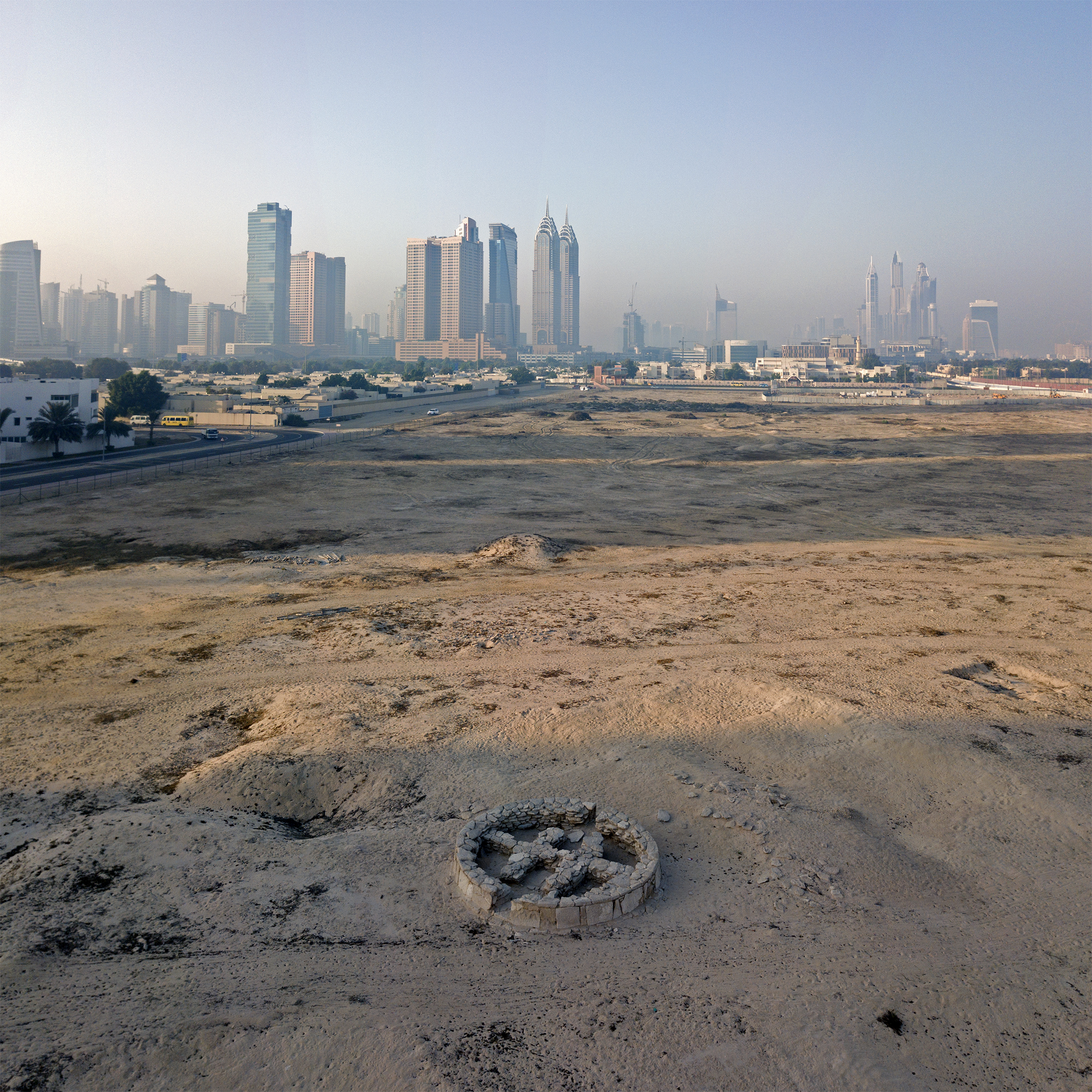
Distinctive Umm Al Nar burial - this grave is at the Al Sufouh Archaeological Site in Dubai.

The first archaeological excavations in Abu Dhabi began at Umm Al Nar in 1959, twelve years before the foundation of the United Arab Emirates. Seven tombs from a total of fifty and three areas at the ruins of the ancient settlement were examined by a Danish Archaeological Expedition under Danish archaeologist PV Glob. During its first visit the expedition identified a few exposed shaped stones fitted together at some of the stone mounds. The following year (February 1959) the first excavations started at one of the mounds on the plateau, now called Tomb I. Two more seasons (1960 and 1961) involved digging more tombs, while the last three seasons (1962/1963, 1964 and 1965) were allocated to examining the settlement.

The Danish excavations on Umm Al Nar halted in 1965 but were resumed in 1975 by an archaeological team from Iraq. During the Iraqi excavations which lasted one season, five tombs were excavated and a small section of the village was examined. Between 1970 and 1975 an Iraqi team carried out further excavations and reconstruction of the Danish-excavated tombs (and houses) on Umm Al Nar Island.

At Al Sufouh Archaeological Site in Dubai, archaeological excavation between 1994 and 1995 revealed an Umm Al Nar type circular tomb dating between 2500 and 2000 BCE. An Umm Al Nar tomb forms the centrepiece of the Mleiha Archaeological Centre in Sharjah.

Dilmun Burial Mounds in Bahrain also feature Umm Al Nar Culture remains.

At Tell Abraq, settlements associated with the start of the Umm Al Nar Culture began c. 2500 BCE.

== Occupation phases ==
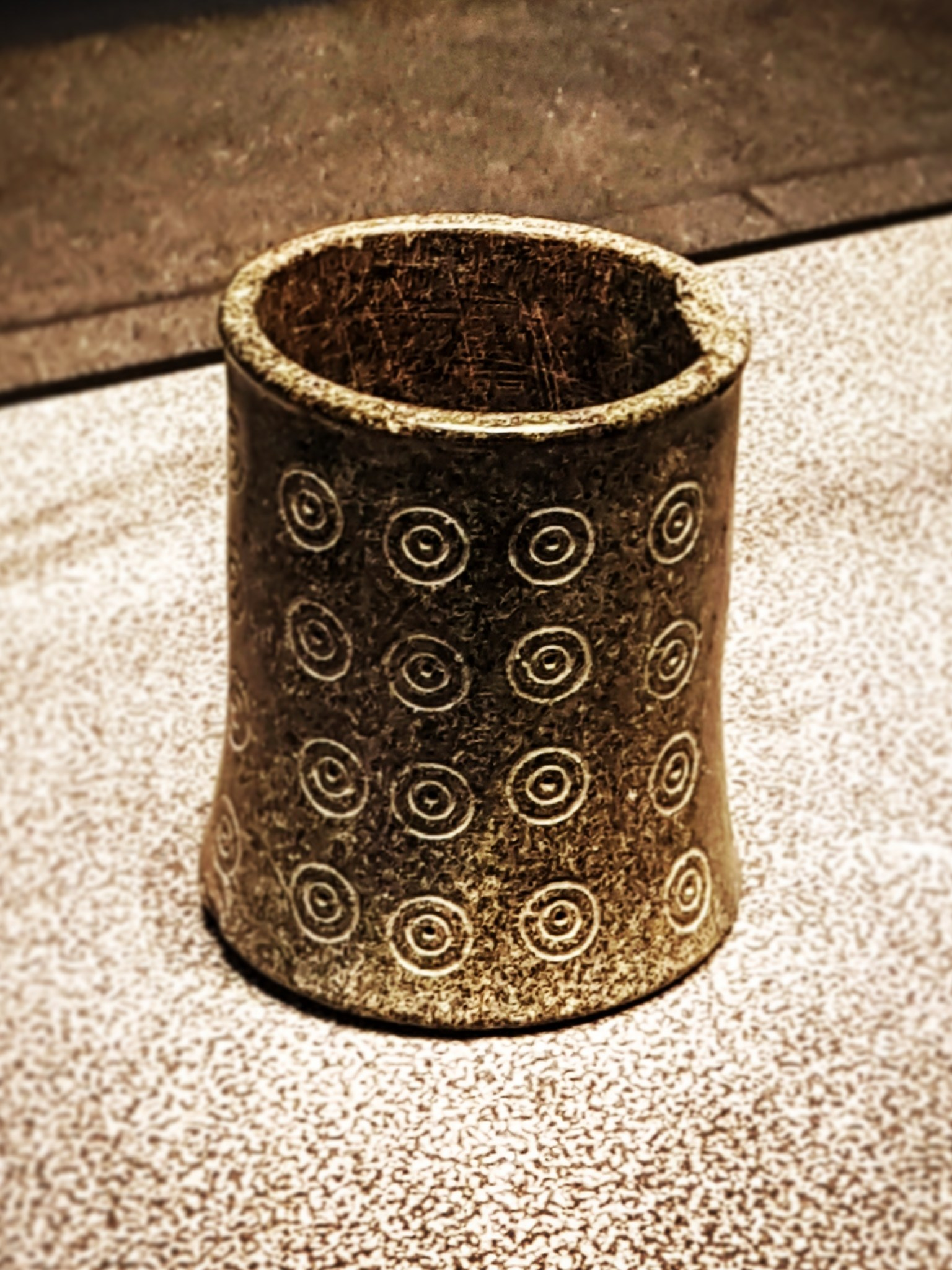
Decorated stone cup from the original Umm Al Nar discovery, Abu Dhabi. Cups similar to these have been found at other Umm Al Nar era sites around the UAE. On display at the Zayed National Museum, Abu Dhabi.

The Ubaid period (5000-3800 BCE) followed the Neolithic Arabian bifacial era. Pottery vessels of the period already show contact with Mesopotamia.

The Hafit period followed the Ubaid period. During the Hafit period (3200 - 2600 BCE) burial cairns with the appearance of a beehive appeared, consisting of a small chamber for one to two burials.

The distinctive circular tombs of the Umm Al Nar period (2600-2000 BCE) distinguish it from the preceding Hafit period, together with finds of distinctive black on red decorated pottery and jewellery made with gems such as carnelian, sourced from the Indus Valley.

A number of important Umm Al Nar sites in the UAE such as Hili, Al Badiyah, Tell Abraq and Kalba feature large towers, presumably defensive in purpose. At Tell Abraq, this fortification is 40 metres in diameter, but most are between 16 and 25 metres. These fortifications typically are built around a well, presumably to protect important water resources.

During this period, the first Sumerian mentions of a land of Magan (Akkadian Makkan) are made, as well as references to 'the Lords of Magan'. Sumerian sources also point to 'Tilmun' (accepted today as modern Bahrain) and Meluhha (thought to refer to the Indus Valley). Akkadian campaigns against Magan took place in the twenty-third century, again possibly explaining the need for fortifications, and both Manishtusu and Naram-Sin in particular, wrote of campaigning against '32 lords of Magan'.

Magan was famed for its shipbuilding and its maritime capabilities. King Sargon of Akkad (2371-2316 BCE) boasted that his ports were home to boats from Tilmun, Magan and Meluhha. His successor, Naram-Sin, not only conquered Magan, but honoured the Magan King Manium by naming the city of Manium-Ki in Mesopotamia after him. Trade between the Indus Valley and Sumer took place through Magan. Ur-Nammu (2113-2096 BCE) laid claim to having 'brought back the ships of Magan'.

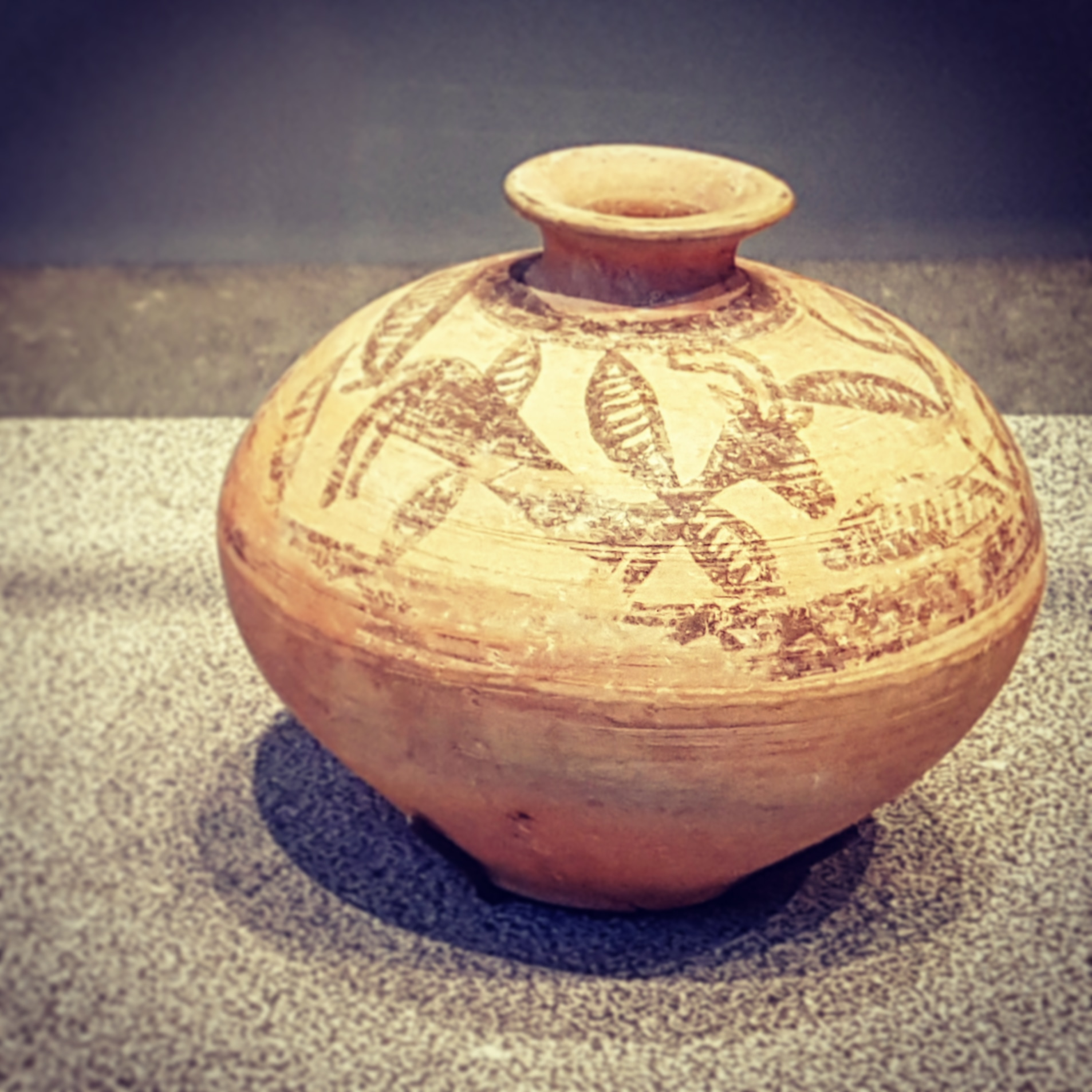
Terracotta Ubaid Ware bottle from the original Umm Al Nar discovery in Abu Dhabi. The bottle dates back to 2000-2500 BCE. On display at the Louvre Abu Dhabi

Archaeological finds dating from this time show trade not only with the Indus Valley and Sumer, but also with Iran and Bactria. They have also revealed what is thought to be the oldest case on record of poliomyelitis, with the distinctive signs of the disease found in the skeleton of a woman from Tell Abraq.

Domestic manufactures in the late third millennium included soft-stone vessels, decorated with dotted circles. These, in the shapes of beakers, bowls and compartmentalised boxes, are distinctive.

The archaeological record of the Hafit and Umm Al Nar periods show the area of southeastern Arabia formed a locus for a bipolar field of trade between Mesopotamia and the Indus where the people of Magan were intermediaries, suppliers and consumers, but also political agents acting in their own interests. In support of this cultural interaction, a pair of copper-alloy cymbals dating to the late third millennium BCE was discovered at the Dahwa 7 archaeological site in northern Oman. Found within a small ritual building and carefully deposited, these instruments bear striking similarities to examples from the Indus Valley civilization, indicating the transmission of musical practices across regions.

The trade with Mesopotamia collapsed in and around 2000 BCE, with a series of disasters including the Aryan invasion of the Indus Valley, the fall of the Mesopotamian city of Ur to Elam in 2000 BCE and the decline of the Indus Valley Harappan Culture in 1800 BCE. The abandonment of the port of Umm Al Nar took place at around this time.

There is some dispute as to the exact cause of the end of the trading era of the Umm Al Nar period and the subsequent, and inwardly focused, domestication of the Wadi Suq period (2000-1300 BCE), and modern consensus is that the transition from the Umm Al Nar to the Wadi Suq period was evolutionary and not revolutionary. The Wadi Suq culture saw more inland settlement, increasingly sophisticated metallurgy and the domestication of the camel.

The poorly represented last phase of the Bronze Age (1600-1300 BCE) has only been vaguely identified in a small number of settlements. This phase of the Bronze Age was followed by a boom when the underground irrigation system (the Falaj (Arabic: فَـلَـج)) or Qanat was introduced during the Iron Age (1300-300 BCE) by local communities.

== See also ==
- Archaeology of the United Arab Emirates
- List of Ancient Settlements in the UAE
- Archaeological Sites of Bat, Al-Khutm and Al-Ayn

== Bibliography ==
- P. Yule–G. Weisgerber, The Tower Tombs at Shir, Eastern Ḥajar, Sultanate of Oman, in: Beiträge zur allgemeinen und vergleichenden Archäologie (BAVA) 18, 1998, 183–241, ISBN 3-8053-2518-5.
- Karen Frifelt, The Island of Umm-an-Nar. Jutland Archaeologcia Society Publications, Aarhus 1995
  - Vol. 1: Third Millennium Graves. ISBN 8772885610.
  - Vol. 2: The Third Millennium Settlement. ISBN 8772885777.
- Walid Yasin Al Tikriti: Archaeology of Umm an-Nar Island (1959–2009). Abu Dhabi Culture & Heritage, Department of Historic Environment, Abu Dhabi 2011
- About Umm an-Nar culture, at academia.edu website:
  - Charlotte Marie Cable, Christopher P. Thornton: Monumentality and the Third-millennium “Towers” of the Oman Peninsula. online
  - Daniel T. Potts: The Hafit – Umm an-Nar transition: Evidence from Falaj al-Qaba'il and Jabal al-Emalah. In. J. Giraud, G. Gernez, V. de Castéja (Hrsg.): Aux marges de l'archéologie: Hommages à Serge Cleuziou. Paris 2012: Travaux de la Maison René-Ginouves 16, S. 371–377. online
