= Bidaa Bint Saud =

Archaeological site in the UAE

UNESCO World Heritage Site
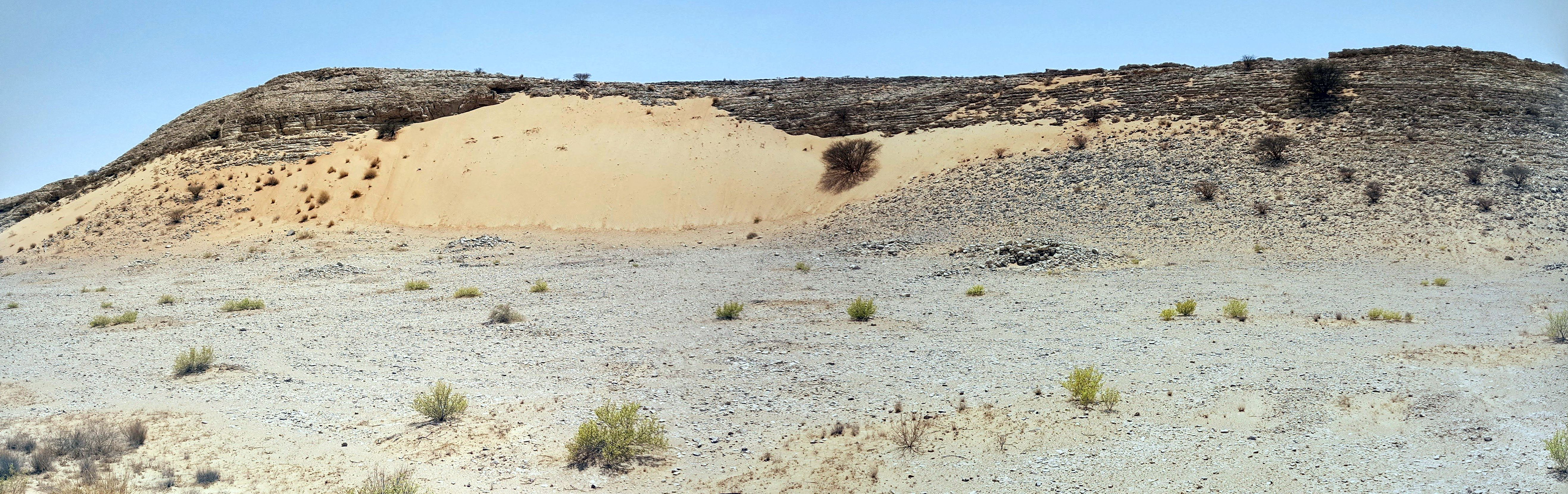
- A panoramic view of the Eastern slopes of Bidaa Bint Saud, showing Hafit period beehive tombs. The Iron Age building is at the top of the tell.

- Location within United Arab Emirates
- Location: The Eastern Region of the Emirate of Abu Dhabi, the U.A.E.
- Part of: Cultural Sites of Al Ain (Hafit, Hili, Bidaa Bint Saud and Oases Areas)
- Criteria: Cultural: (iii), (iv), (v)
- Reference: 1343
- Inscription: 2011 (35th Session)
- Coordinates: 24°23′7″N 55°43′6″E

Bidaa Bint Saud (Arabic: بِدَع بِنْت سُعُوْد, romanized: Bidaʿ Bint Suʿūd) is an archaeological site in Eastern Region of the Emirate of Abu Dhabi, the U.A.E., notable for its Hafit Period tombs, Iron Age irrigation systems and rare remains of an Iron Age building thought to have been a distribution centre for water from two aflaj (systems of underground and surface waterways). It is a listed UN World Heritage Site. Finds from the site are displayed at Al Ain National Museum.

The dating of pottery from the aflaj (singular falaj) waterways found at the site demonstrates a south-eastern Arabian origin for this distinctive system of irrigation, previously thought by many scholars to have been Persian in origin. The dating of aflaj in Bidaa bint Saud, Al Ain and Buraimi, both of which are in the historical region of Tawam, has been placed several centuries prior to the Achaemenid Empire, which had previously been credited with the innovation.

The site, located some 15 kilometres (9.3 miles) north of Al Ain, is thought to have been a stopping place on a long-established caravan route from settlements at Al Ain to the Northern Emirates. The rocky outcrop of Garn bin Saud looms some 40 m (130 ft) above the site and is dotted with burial remains.

== Bronze Age tombs ==
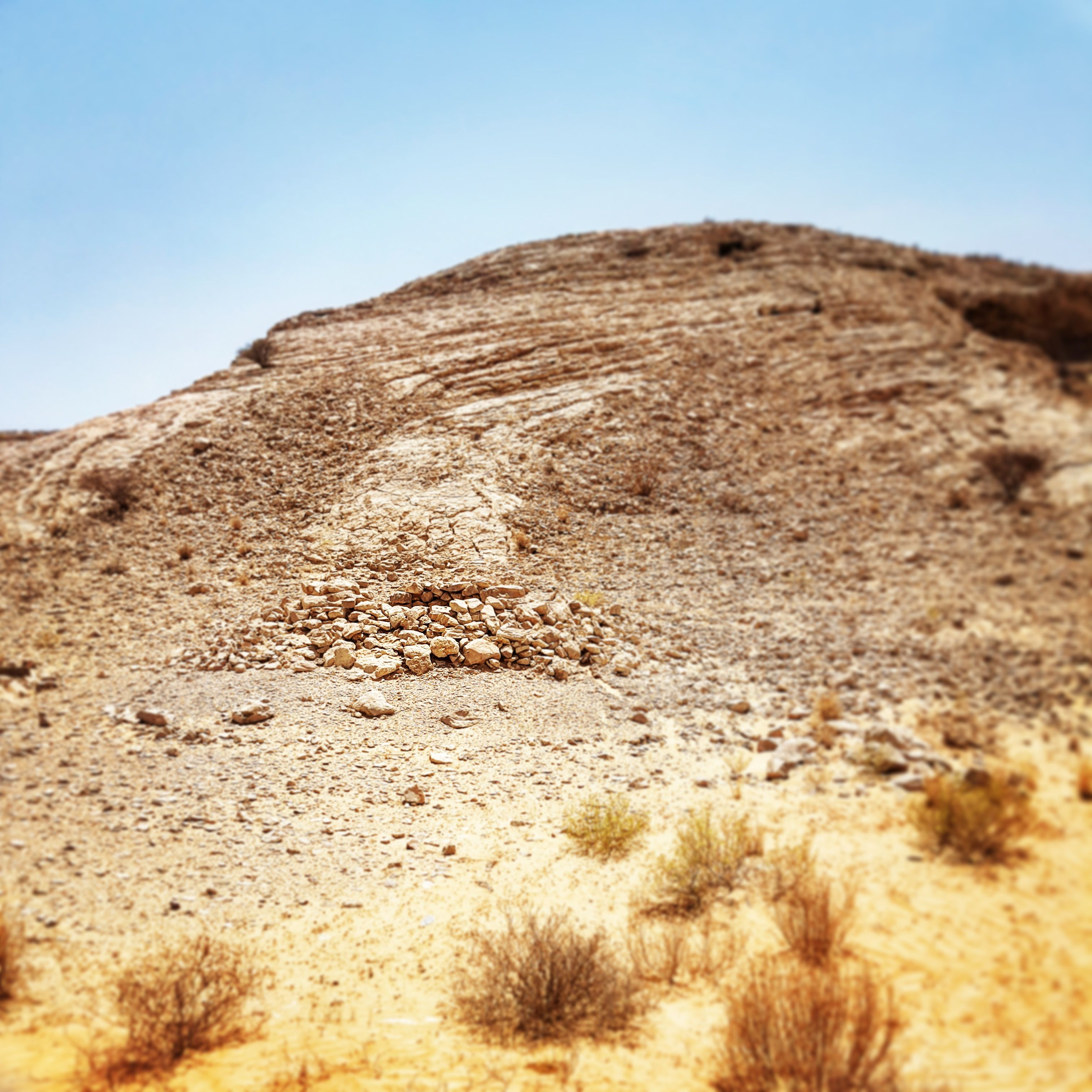
A Hafit period beehive tomb at Bidaa Bint Saud

A number of distinctive Hafit Period (3200 to 2600 BCE) tombs litter the eastern face of Garn bint Saud, similar to those found at sites such as Jebel Hafit, Jebel Buhais and Buraimi. These have collapsed and would originally have had domed roofs. It is likely the location of the Hafit remains, the Hafit people being nomadic and pastoral, is because of a source of groundwater, a pattern supported by other Hafit era inland finds, including those at Jebel Hafit and Jebel Buhais. Wadi Suq period burials are also evidenced at the site.

== Iron Age waterways ==
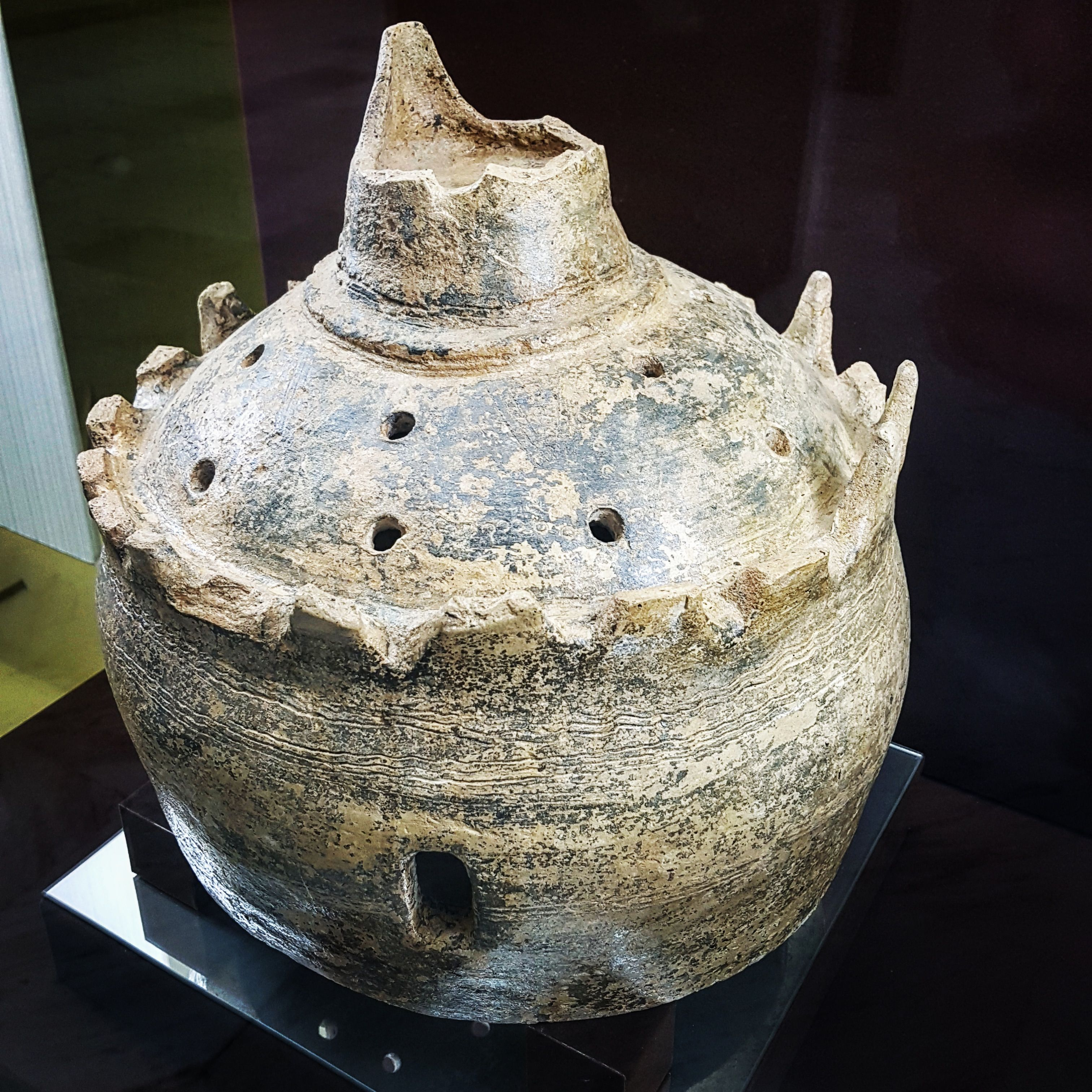
A pot, discovered in the Iron Age building at Bidaa Bint Saud and on display at the Al Ain National Museum. It is thought to be an incense burner.

A second set of collective graves found at the site dated from the Iron Age and were also built of uncut or rough-cut stone and formed into a variety of shapes. These were divided into several chambers, each of which contained the remains of several people. Despite having been plundered in the past, excavations from these Iron Age tombs yielded a number of artefacts, including pottery and stone vessels, dagger blades, bronze arrowheads, and beads.

It is thought Bidaa Bint Saud became an important site during the Iron Age, both as a caravan stop and as a settled community of farmers that used the falaj irrigation system.

Two of these irrigation passages have been partly excavated at Bidaa bin Saud, with a number of sections remaining in reasonable condition. In one of the excavations, a number of sandstone-lined shaft holes were discovered, as well as a stepped underground access point and a large open cistern. Evidence of formerly irrigated land has also been found at the site.

The mother well is thought to have been relatively shallow, about 1 km (0.62 miles) away from the head of the falaj systems.

Located some 150 metres (490 feet) from the main access point of the falaj, archaeologists have also excavated a large mud-brick building containing a hall of 10 by 13 metres (33 by 43 feet). Parts of the remains stand up to 160 centimetres (63 inches) high and, while the roof is missing, there is evidence it was supported by 12 columns.

Storage rooms were a later addition and contained finds of many storage jars. While the building's precise purpose remains unclear, archaeologists think it was likely a distribution point for the water from the falaj systems and it has been dubbed Bait Al-Falaj (Arabic: بَيْت ٱلْفَلَج, lit. 'House of The Falaj'). In common with other key Iron Age sites in the Emirates, including Rumeilah and Al Thuqeibah, Muweilah and Masafi, buildings and ceramics associated with the distribution of water and with rituals, including the burning of incense and communal banqueting, attest to the emergence of structured communities.

== See also ==
- Iron Age in the United Arab Emirates
- List of Ancient Settlements in the UAE
- List of cultural property of national significance in the United Arab Emirates
- Qattara Oasis
- Rumailah, UAE
- Umm Al Nar culture
