= Al Thuqeibah =

Archaeological site in the UAE

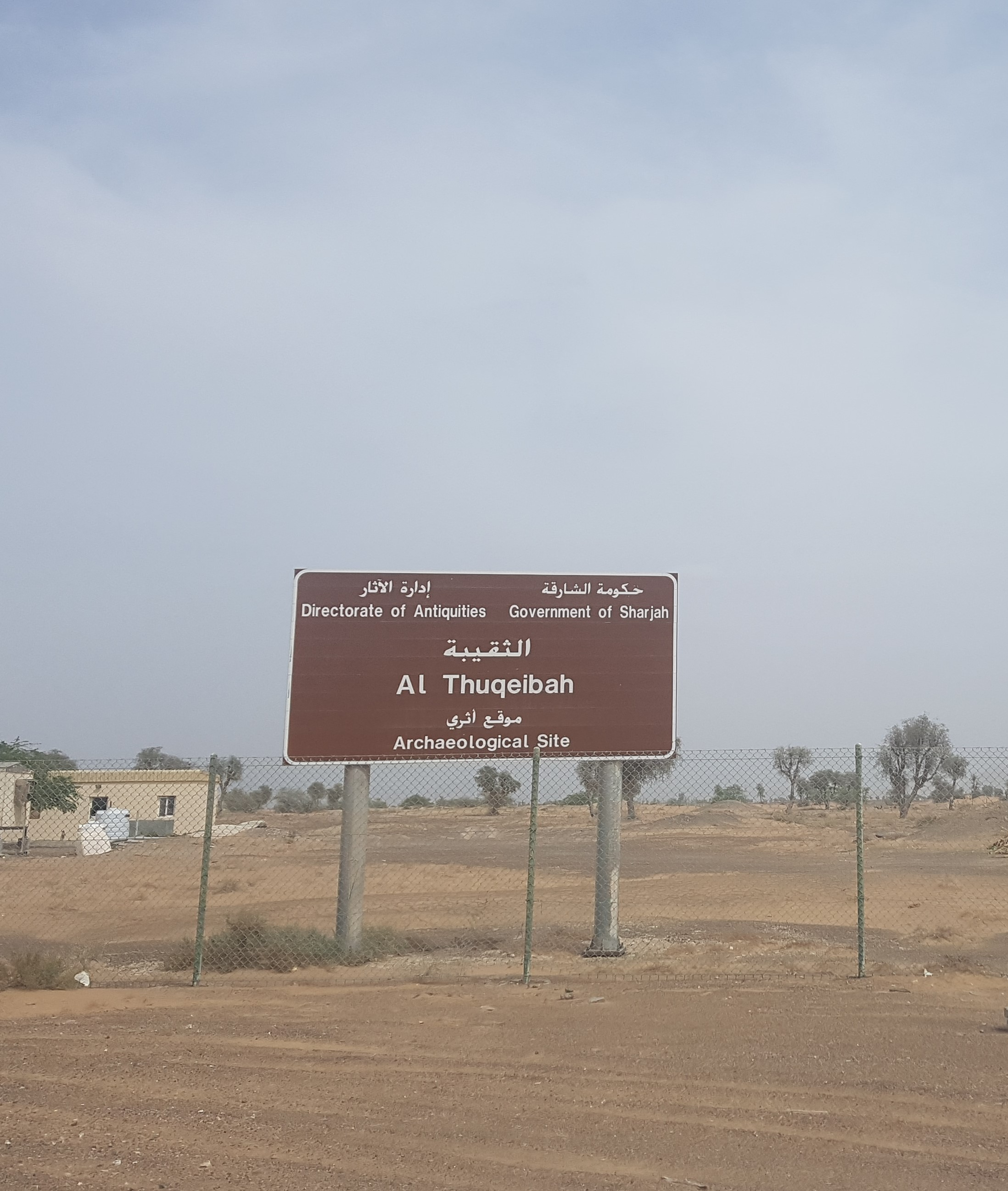
Al Thuqeibah Archaeological Site today.

Al Thuqeibah is an Iron Age archaeological site located near the town of Al Madam in Sharjah, United Arab Emirates (UAE). The site was originally excavated by teams from the Autonomous University of Madrid in the mid-1990s. Thuqeibah has been dated from the Iron Age II and III periods (1,100-400 BC). A settlement consisting of a number of houses and a well, it has been associated with a nearby Iron Age falaj system, thought to date from the Iron Age II era.

Analysis of the finds from Thuqeibah show that its inhabitants kept livestock, although a significant number of Iron Age arrowheads were found at the site. The combination of husbandry and hunting is consistent with the transition in society which took place throughout the Wadi Suq era. In addition, bronze blades, needles, awls and pins were found, pointing to a wide range of economic activity. Located in a natural crossing of the Hajar Mountains, finds at Thuqeibah suggest an unusual amount of sea fish was consumed by the inhabitants (the village is 80 km from the nearest sea) and that the village was therefore integrated into a wider Iron Age economy. An unusually large number of storage jars were found at the site.

The nearby necropolis at Jebel Buhais is thought to be linked to Thuqeibah, which has itself yielded no discoveries of tombs.

An unusual find, House H4, is located some 200m from the core of Thuqeibah and has a large number of well constructed fireplaces which appear unconnected with the main structure and which showed no evidence of any food processing or other associated craft.

Al Thuqeibah has been likened to the similar Iron Age development at Rumailah in Al Ain, with a number of important characteristics shared by a number of Iron Age sites across the Emirates including Thuqeibah, Rumailah, Bidaa Bint Saud, Muweilah and Masafi, we find buildings and ceramics associated incense burning, ritual, communal banqueting and the organised community distribution of water.

== See also ==
- List of Ancient Settlements in the UAE
- Iron Age in the United Arab Emirates
- History of the United Arab Emirates
