= Tawam =

Tawam may refer to:

== Arabic ==
- Tawām (Arabic: تَوَام), also 'Tuwwam', a historical region in Eastern Arabia divided by the modern settlements of Al Ain (UAE) and Al-Buraimi (Oman)
  - Tawam Roundabout, a roundabout in Al-Ain
  - Tawam Hospital, a hospital in Al-Ain

== Tamang ==
- Tāwām; the Tamang name for the red panda (Ailurus fulgens), a mammal found in Asia
