= Saruq Al Hadid =

Archaeological site in Dubai

Coordinates: 24.6654392°N 55.2392885°E

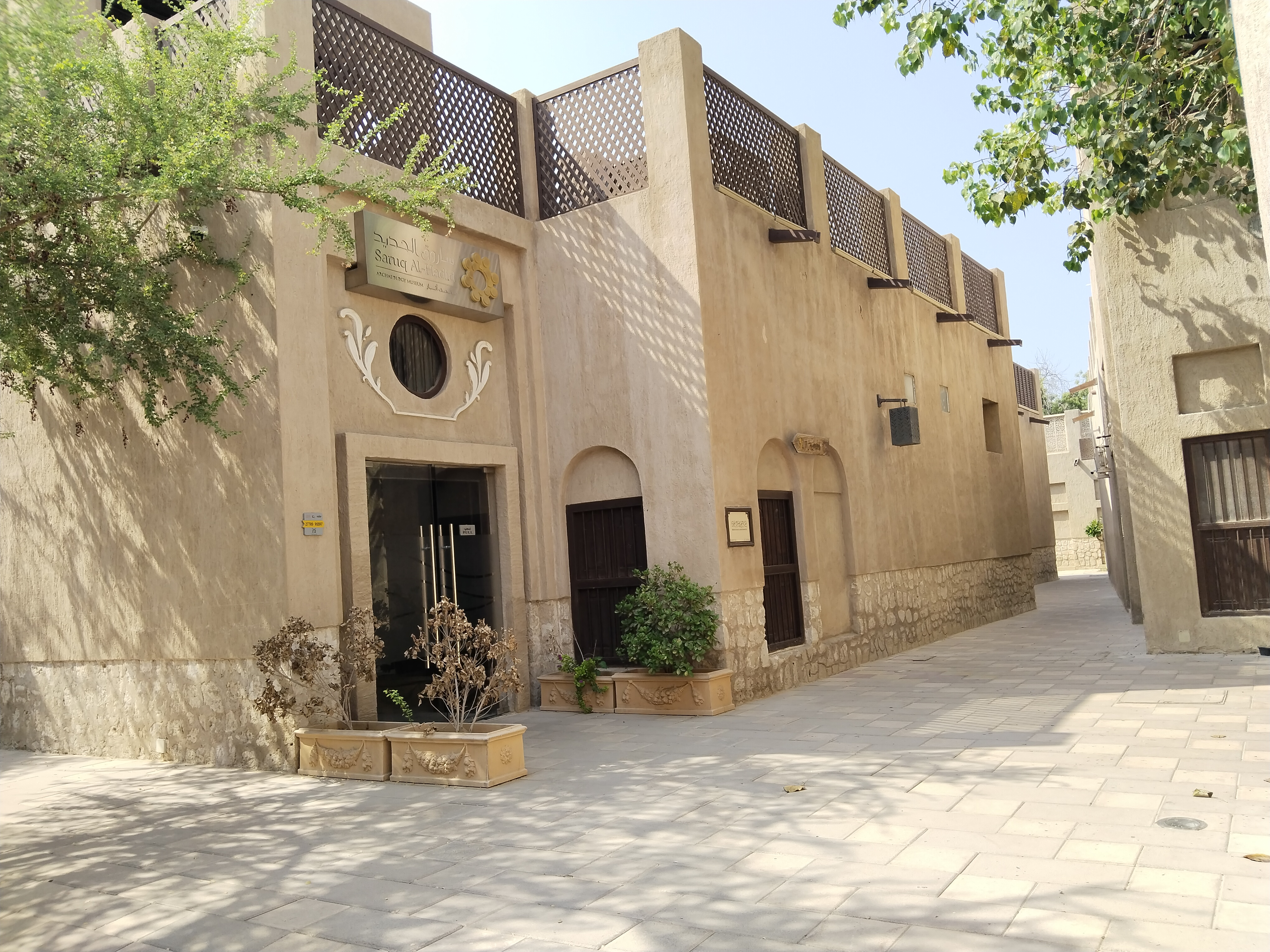
Saruq Al Hadid Archaeological Museum Building

Saruq Al Hadid (Arabic: ساروق الحديد Sarug al-hadeed) is an archaeological site in the Emirate of Dubai, United Arab Emirates (UAE), and stands as one of the most important and enigmatic historical sites in the country. Findings from the site are displayed in a museum with the same name in the city of Dubai. The site was originally discovered by the ruler of Dubai, Sheikh Mohammed bin Rashid Al Maktoum, while flying his helicopter across the desert.

== The site ==
The Saruq Al Hadid site is considered to have been a centre of constant human habitation, trade and metallurgy from the Umm Al Nar period (2600–2000 BCE) to the Iron Age (1,000 BCE), when it was a major location for smelting bronze, copper and Iron. Arguably its most important period of flourishing was as a metallurgical centre in the Iron Age II period (1100–600 BCE). One of the many thousands of finds to be documented at the site was an ornate gold ring, which became the inspiration for Dubai's Expo 2020 logo.

An abundance of pottery and metal artifacts have given rise to speculation of possibly identifying the site as a centre of snake worship. In all, over 12,000 unique objects have been unearthed at the site. A number of key finds are on public display at Dubai's Saruq Al Hadid Archaeology Museum in Al Shindagha, housed in a traditional barjeel (wind tower) building constructed in 1928 by Sheikh Juma bin Maktoum Al Maktoum.

The site, a millennia-old hub for manufacturing and trade, has been linked to Dubai's present role as a global trading hub.

In September 2024 it was reported that remote sensing satellite technology will be used to help excavations at the site. Researches expect to find structures, tombs and other findings.

== Discovery ==
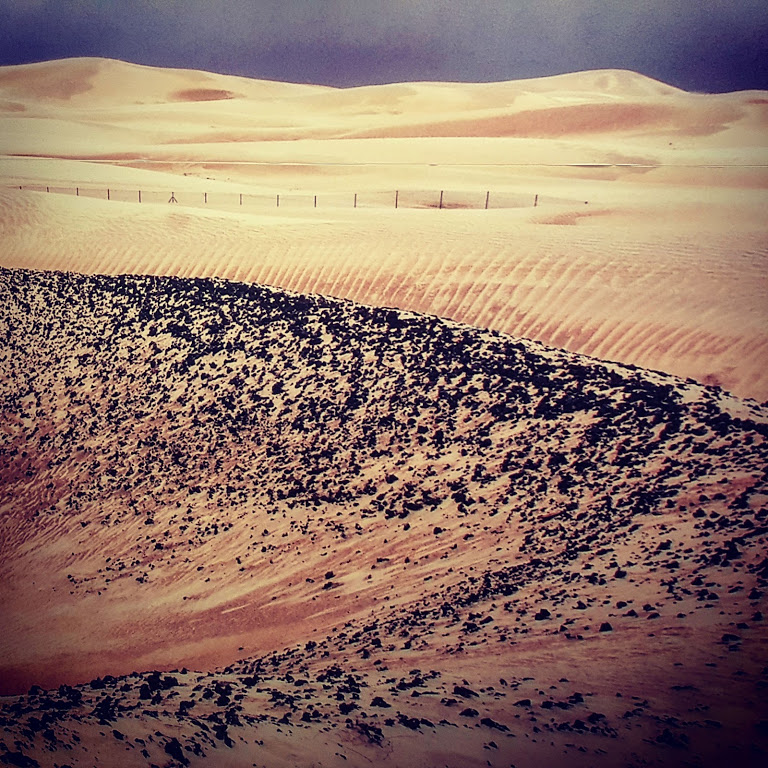
The Saruq Al Hadid site

The site, now part of the Al Marmoom Desert Conservation Reserve, was discovered incidentally in 2002 by Sheikh Mohammed bin Rashid Al Maktoum, Vice President and Prime Minister of the UAE and Ruler of Dubai, as he was flying across the desert in his helicopter. Noticing some unusual dune formations and a large black deposit in the sands, he reported the site to Dubai Municipality. The site proved to be a field of waste, or slag, from copper and iron smelting. It was conjectured the extensive slag field, measuring some 1.5 hectares, had stopped the sand shifting and blowing and so had preserved the underlying site.

That first exploration yielded a horde of ceramics, beads and copper and bronze artifacts, including arrowheads, axe heads, a fish-hook, bracelets, knives and, intriguingly, models of snakes. Five seasons of excavations led by Jordan’s department of antiquities followed, revealing “an extraordinary collection of Iron Age artefacts”. The survey work carried out at this time also unearthed the nearby Umm Al Nar site of Al-Ashoosh. This was followed by a series of digs carried out in 2008–2009 by the Dubai Desert Survey, a joint project between a group of American researchers and the Dubai Department of Tourism and Commerce Marketing. This revealed that the site was not just an Iron Age settlement, but a multi-period site with distinct site functions spread over more than three millennia.

Several archaeological expeditions have worked on the site in recent years. The Saruq al-Hadid Archaeological Research Project (SHARP) from the University of New England (UNE), Australia, completed a three-year programme of archaeological fieldwork and post-excavation analysis in 2017. Research in different sectors of the site was also carried out by teams from the Sanisera Archaeological Institute (Spain, 2015–2019), Thomas Urban and Partner (Germany, 2016–2017) and the Polish Centre of Mediterranean Archaeology University of Warsaw (Poland, 2016–2018). Until 2018, the Polish team, directed by Piotr Bieliński and Iwona Zych, excavated a part of the site chosen for exploration because of a large accumulation (several tons) of copper slag. The researchers found large amounts of strips of copper and gold, as well as other semi-finished products and numerous metal finds. Most of them were produced locally, but many objects were imported from different parts of the world.

== Finds ==
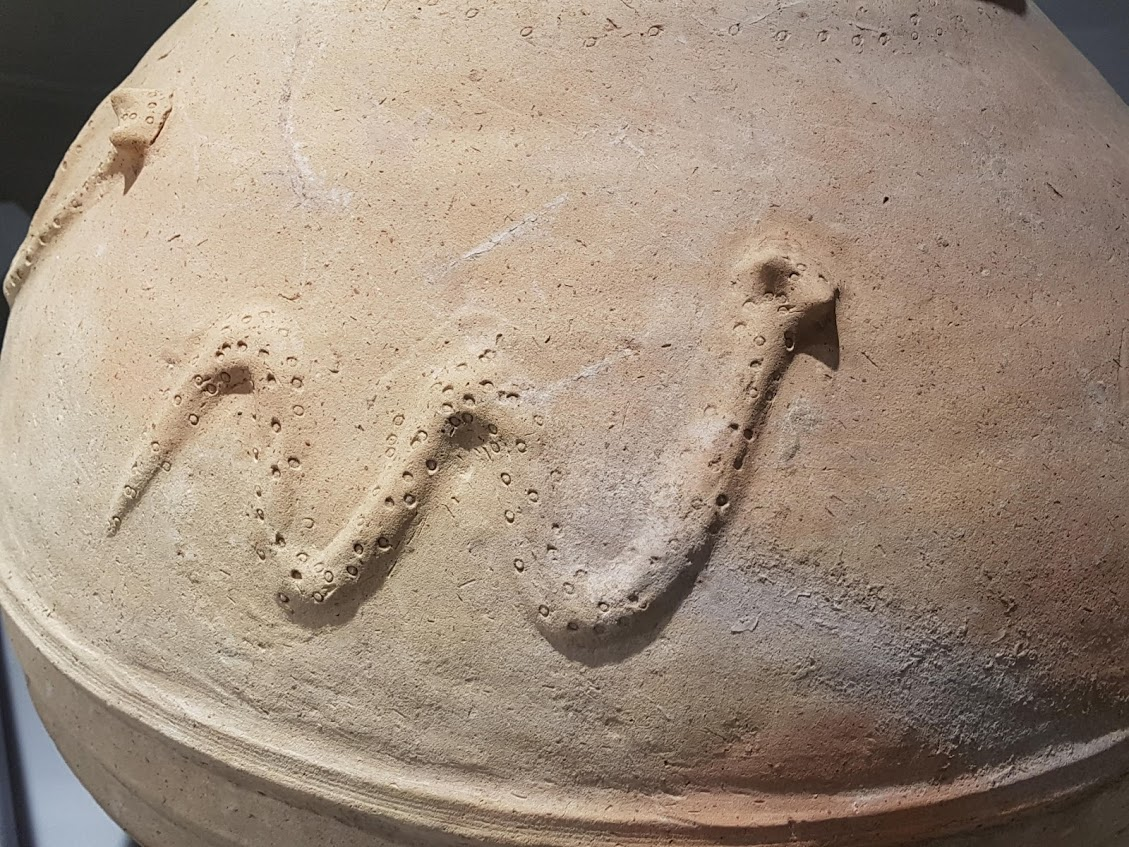
Snake emblem on pottery jar from Saruq Al Hadid

Located some 40 km inland from the shore at Jebel Ali, the site is an enigma – the three requirements for smelting metals (water, fuel and ore) are lacking. It has been speculated that the site may have been chosen because of religious beliefs. Bronze snakes found at the site, as well as pottery decorated with snake motifs, provide some of the many mysteries of Saruq Al Hadid. In smaller numbers, these have been found elsewhere in the UAE and Oman, specifically at Qusais, Rumailah, Bithnah, Masafi and Salut, but Saruq Al Hadid was either the main centre for production or was of great significance to what may have been a snake cult.

Early eras at Saruq Al Hadid are represented by stone-lined hearths and ash-pits, as well as associated post-holes. A series of midden deposits containing large amounts of animal bone have supported carbon dating to the Umm Al Nar and Wadi Suq periods. Deposits of a large number of artefacts, thought to have been cached, have been dated to Iron Age I-II, with finds between 1.3–3 metres dated to Iron Age II. Surface deposits represent Iron Age II and later.

A total of 223,889 bone fragments have been recovered from the site, from camel and oryx bones through to rodents, with widespread evidence of both hunting and husbandry and also hide processing. There are also a large number of saltwater fish bones, including whole fish bodies of bream, needlefish, emperorfish and grunt, which would point to the salting and preservation of fish at the coast before its transportation inland. This practice of salting fish for inland consumption was first observed at Mleiha.

As well as bones of inland bird species such as quail, Socotra cormorant bones were also evident. Animal remains point to Saruq Al Hadid enjoying richer vegetation in the past. Pottery finds point to Iron Age I and Wadi Suq links with Tell Abraq, Kalba and Shimal, as well as Muweilah and Bithnah, the latter also a site where snake motifs are notable on pottery.

Decorative items unearthed from Saruq Al Hadid include metal and stone jewellery, as well as elaborate items carved from shell. Depictions of snakes are a common decoration motif. The research results indicate that the metallurgical production was accompanied by ritual practices.

== Metallurgy ==
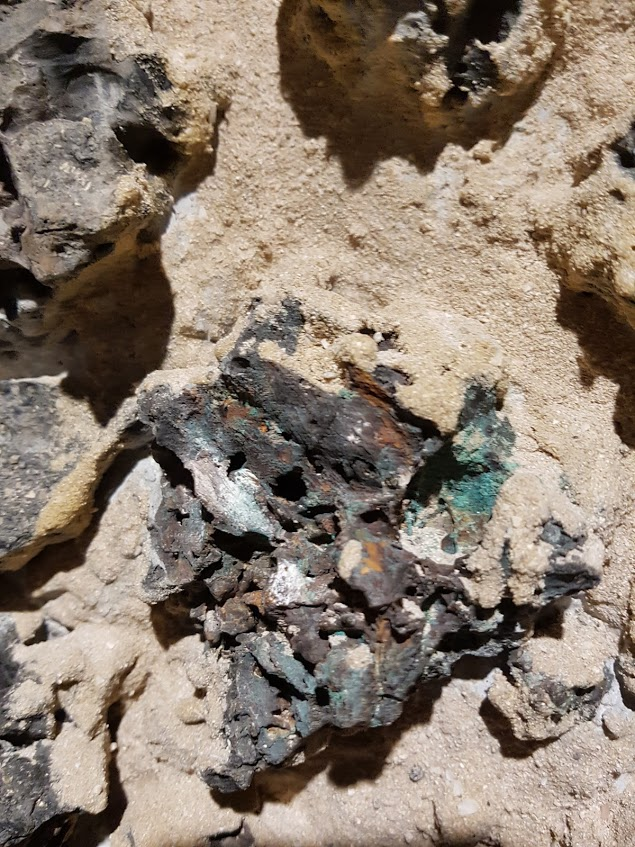
Copper slag from the Saruq Al Hadid site

Widespread evidence for copper smelting at Saruq Al Hadid consists of slag, ingots and finished items, as well as copper scrap. While there have been finds at the site linking smelting to Wadi Suq objects, most evidence is of later origin, from the early Iron Age through to the pre-Islamic period. Finished copper items recovered from the site include extensive troves of weapons (swords, daggers, knives, axes and arrow-heads), as well as adornments and decorations – including snake figurines. While many items were made from very pure copper, traces of alloys have been found, including alloys of tin – which is not found naturally in Arabia and which must therefore have been traded from overseas. Finds of zinc-rich 'brass' have also been recorded.

A number of bimetallic items, comprising ferrous and copper alloys, have been found at the site, with over 200 kg of ferrous remains in all – a significant quantity given the dearth of ferrous items recovered from other sites in the region. Despite the wide range of ferrous items recovered, there has been no sign of furnaces or iron slag at the site. Major finds of gold at Saruq Al Hadid include base materials, wire and strips, as well as finished items such as beads and rings made from pure gold, gold sheet over silver alloy and lead.

== Trade links ==
The 53 seals unearthed from the site constitute the largest collection of Iron Age seals in the Arabian Peninsula and demonstrate links with Mesopotamia, the Indo-Iranian area and Egypt. Seals with distinctive patterns from 'Dilmun', as well as animal, figurative, crescent, pyramid and star patterns have been found and catalogued. Finds of early Iron Age carved wooden artefacts at the site consist of local woods such as Acacia, Ghaf and Sidr, but also items made from olive and pine wood, which point to early trade links with the Levant.

As well as evidence of metals from far afield such as tin, which is not found in the Gulf peninsula, carnelian beads point to links with the Indus Valley, while seals and pottery finds link to the Sumerians of Mesopotamia.

Rituals connected with the cult of a snake have a long tradition in the Levant, which suggests the existence of contacts between these regions in the Late Bronze and Early Iron Ages.

== Saruq Al Hadid Archaeology Museum ==
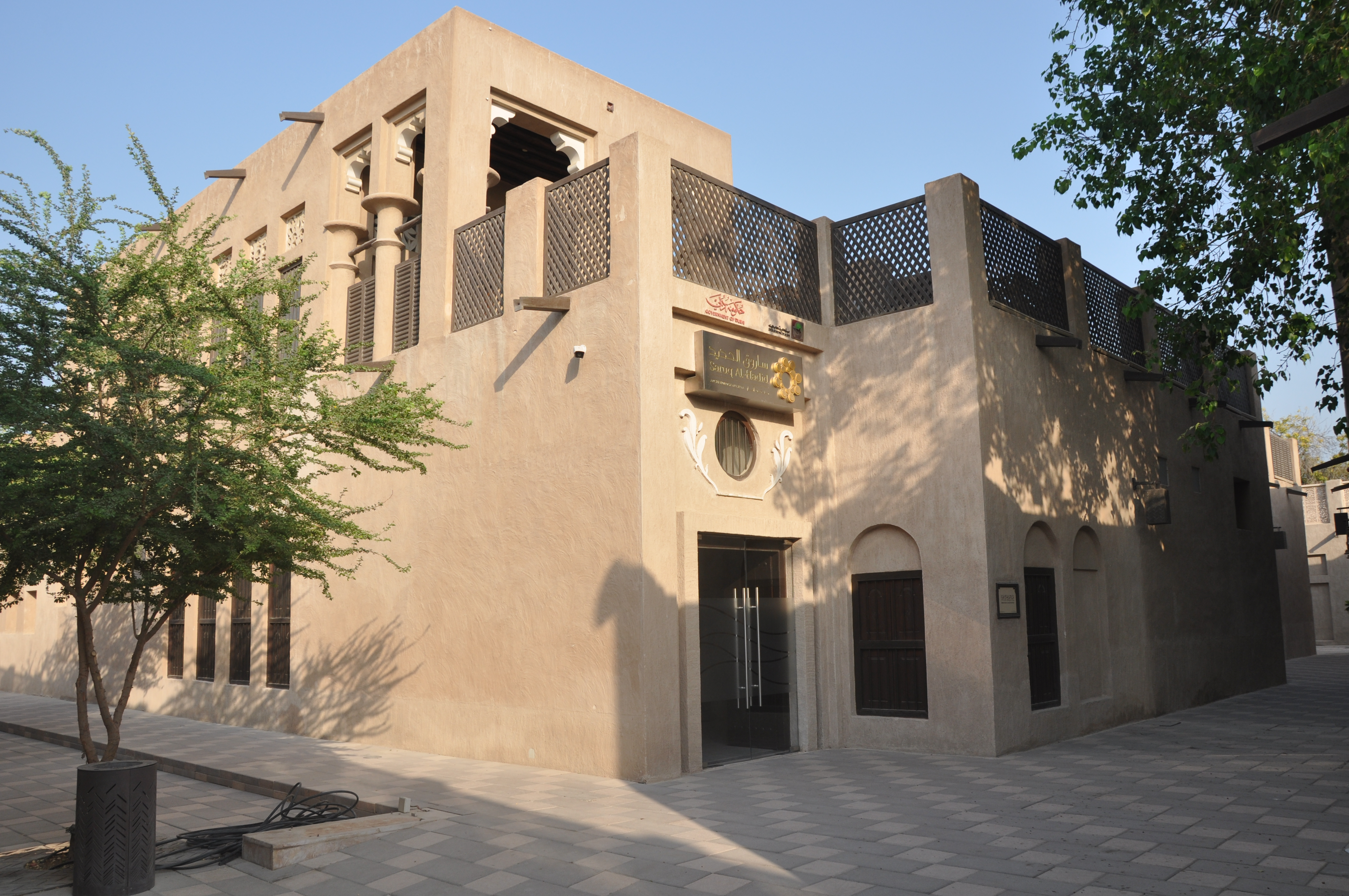
The Saruq Al Hadid Archaeological Museum is located in the former house of Juma Al Maktoum in Al Shindagha, Dubai

The Saruq Al Hadid Archaeology Museum opened to the public in 2016 in the Shindagha heritage district of Dubai, near Dubai Creek and was inaugurated by Sheikh Mohammed bin Rashid Al Maktoum. The museum features collections found in the Saruq Al Hadid site as well as archaeological information gathered from the site. The museum is located in the historic house of Sheikh Juma Al Maktoum (brother to the former Ruler of Dubai, Sheikh Saeed bin Maktoum bin Hasher Al Maktoum) in Shindagha. The display is composed of multiple rooms each containing specific items and explanations of the archaeological history associated with the items. The museum is divided into rooms which contain metalwork, animal bones, snake symbols, and jewelry. The facility also houses a gift shop for tourists.

Other historic sites in the area include the Sheikh Saeed Al Maktoum House, now also a museum that houses old artifacts of Dubai.

== Gallery ==
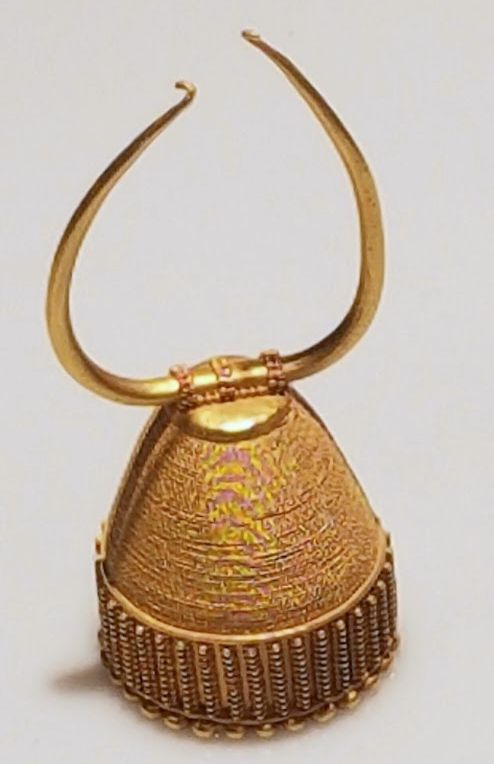
Gold jewellery from Saruq Al Hadid

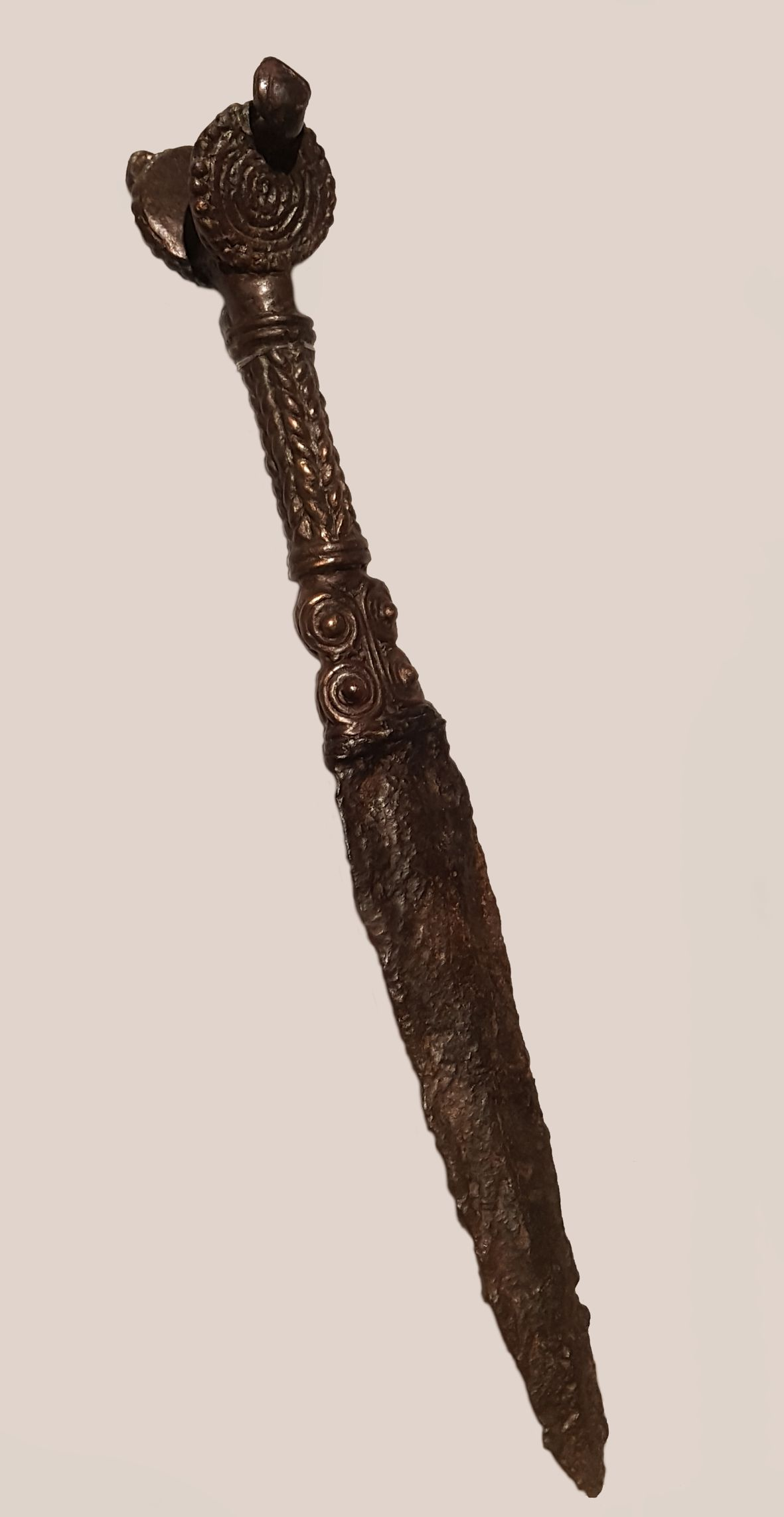
A Bronze and Iron Dagger, found at Saruq Al Hadid. X-ray analysis revealed how the metals were combined.

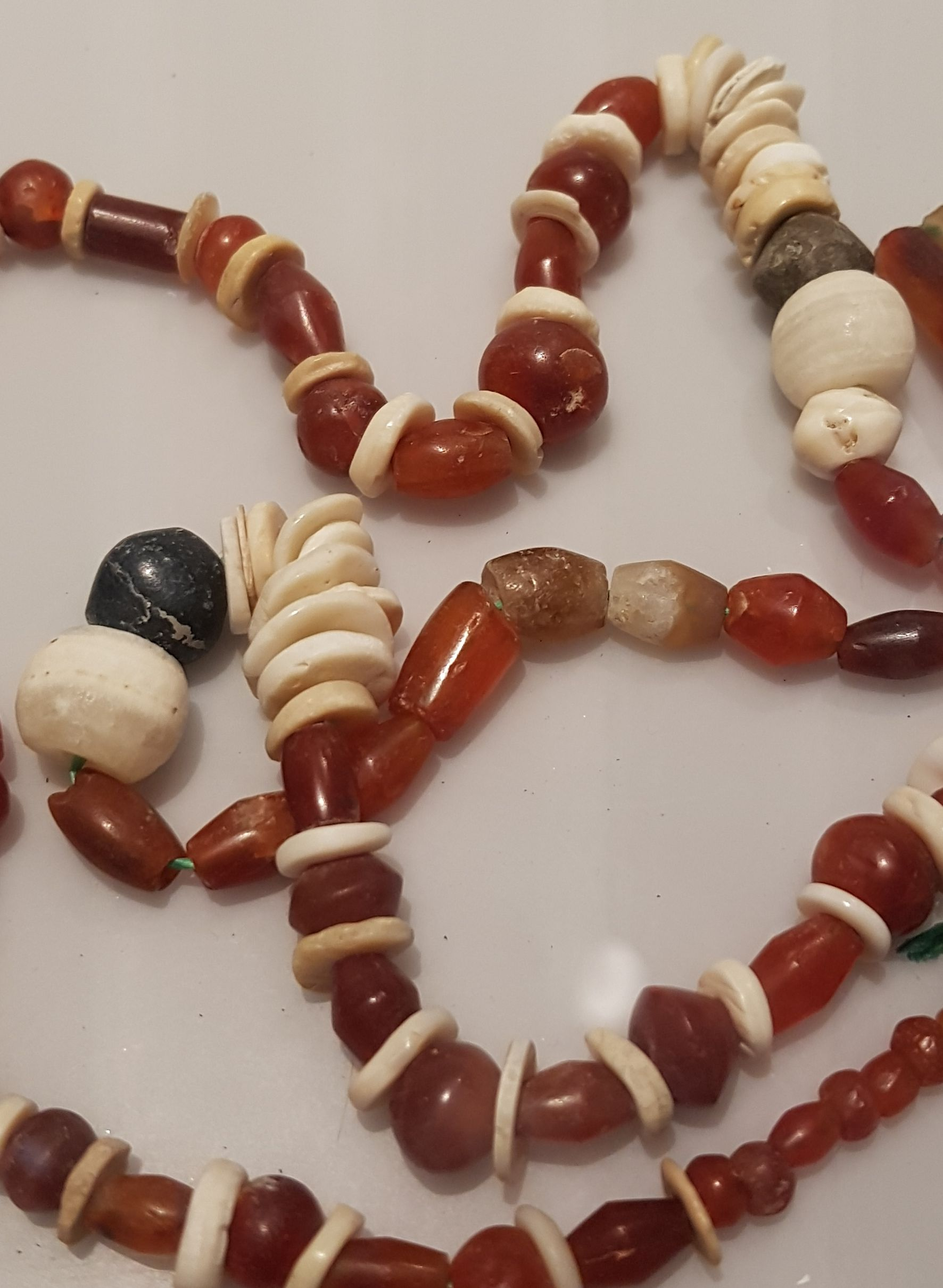
Necklace of beads made from carnelian, bone and stone. It is thought that carnelian jewellery found in the UAE originated in the Indus Valley.

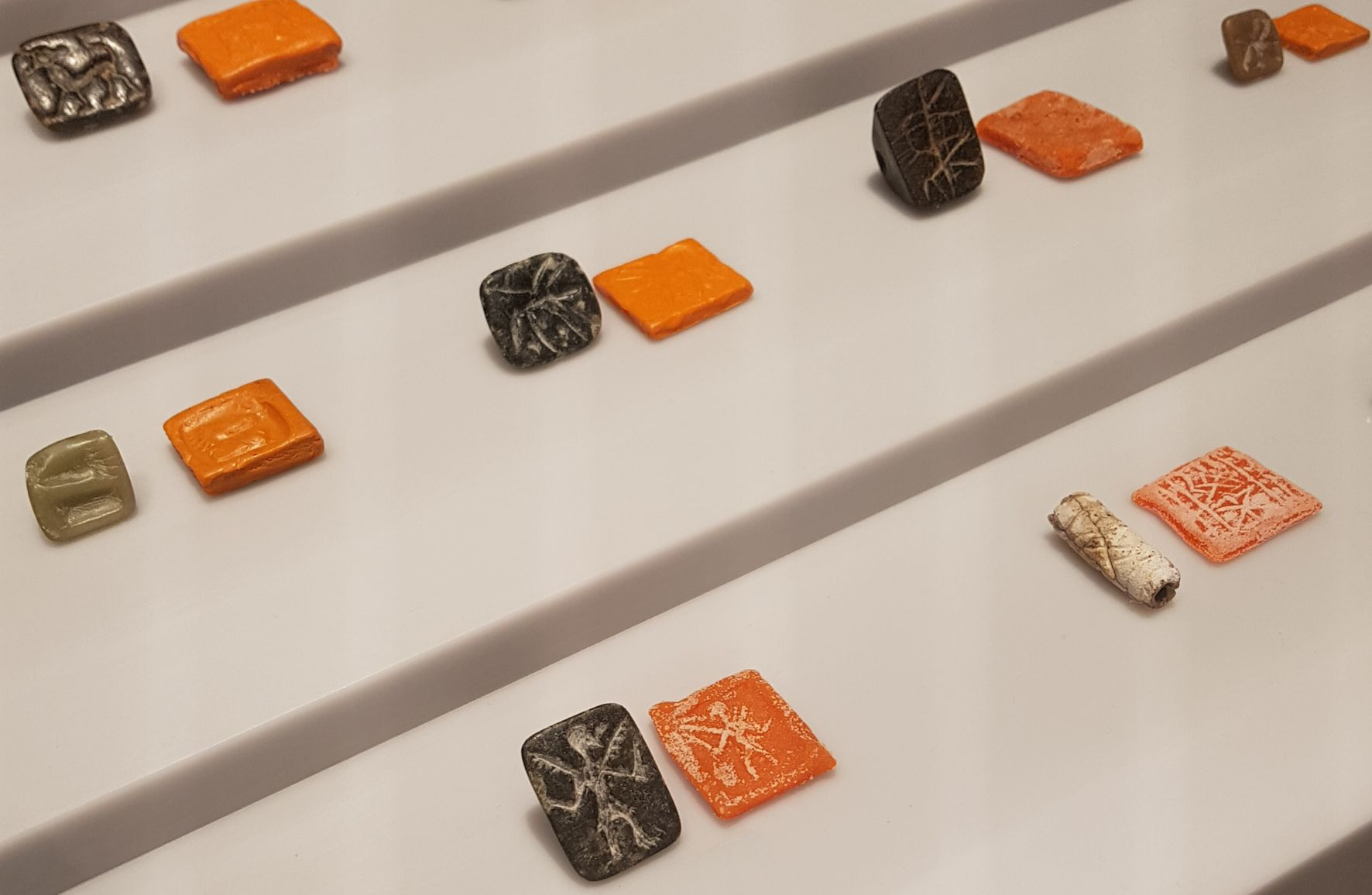
Seals on display at the Saruq Al Hadid Archaeology Museum originating from Mesopotamia, Bahrain and Egypt.

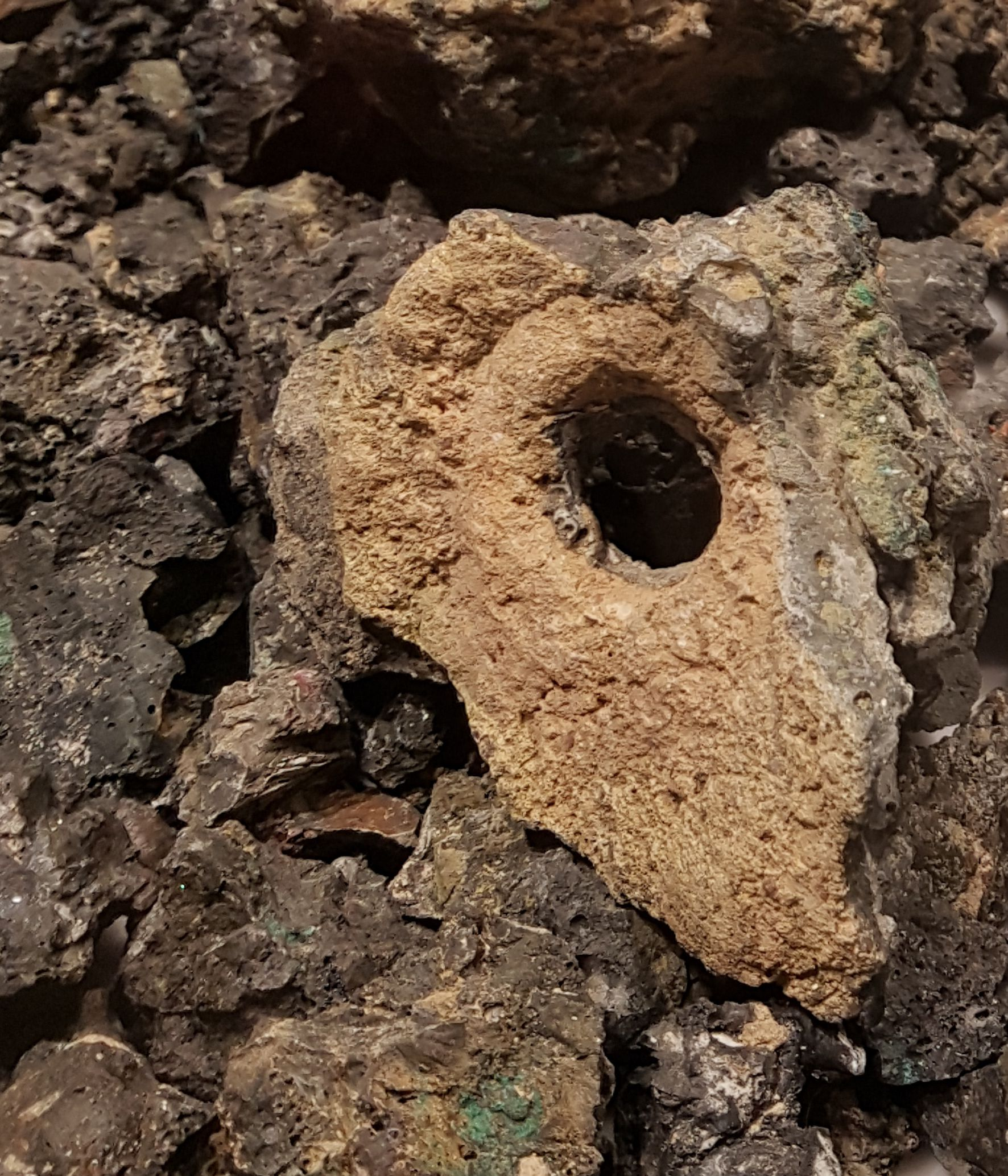
Blow hole from Iron Age furnace wall at Saruq Al Hadid.

== See also ==
- List of Ancient Settlements in the UAE
- Archaeology of the United Arab Emirates
- Iron Age in the United Arab Emirates
