= Iron Age in the United Arab Emirates =

Part of the history of the UAE

In prehistoric Arabia, the territory currently known as the United Arab Emirates was home to three distinct Iron Age periods. Iron Age I spanned 1,200–1,000 BCE, Iron Age II from 1,000 to 600 BCE, and Iron Age III from 600 to 300 BCE. This period of human development in the region was followed by the Mleiha or Pre-Islamic Recent (PIR) era, from 300 BCE onwards through to the Islamic era which effectively commenced with the culmination of the 7th-century Ridda Wars.

To some degree the term 'Iron Age' is misapplied, as little evidence exists for any indigenous iron-work outside finds at Muweilah, themselves thought to be imports, and even the extensive evidence of smelting throughout the Iron Age found at Saruq Al Hadid is dominated by copper and tin production.

A number of important innovations from this period include the water-bearing irrigation technology, the qanat which, though previously thought to be of Iranian origin, was actually an Iron Age innovation of Southeastern Arabia, the falaj – evolved through the cultivation of date palms and other crops.

Finds from the important site of Tell Abraq have been crucial in the division of the three Iron Age periods in the UAE.

== Iron Age I ==
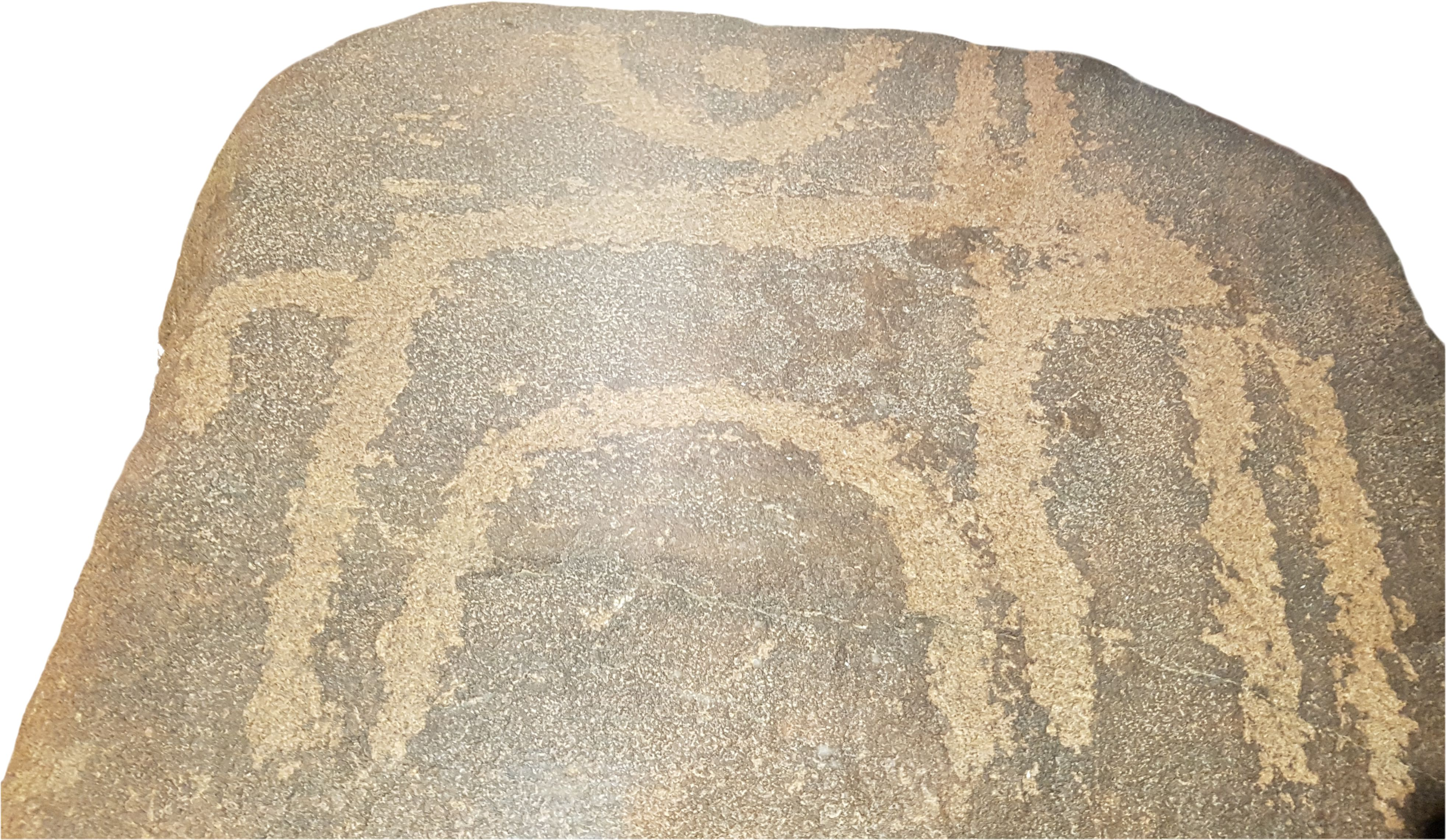
Iron Age Petroglyph from Sharjah, United Arab Emirates

The Iron Age I period in the UAE immediately followed the Wadi Suq period, which ran from 2,000 to 1,300 BCE. The Wadi Suq people not only domesticated camels, but there is evidence they also planted crops of wheat, barley and dates. A gradual shift away from coastal to inland settlements took place through the period. The majority of finds dated to the Iron Age I period are centered around Shimal, Tell Abraq and Al Hamriyah on the West coast and Kalba to the East. Despite growing inland development, the Iron Age I diet still contained a large amount of fish and shellfish. Gazelle, oryx and domesticated animals (sheep, goats and cattle) also formed part of the Iron Age I diet, supplemented by the emerging widespread cultivation of wheat and barley.

Iron Age I ceramics reflect a continuity from the Wadi Suq period and are coarse, often large in scale. Another link to the Wadi Suq period was revealed when analysis of a bivalve shell dated to the Iron Age I period showed it had contained atacamite, a copper-based pigment used as eye make-up. Similar shells were found in a Wadi S uq burial in Sha'am, in Northern Ras Al Khaimah.

The emergence of the Iron Age I period saw a reduction in human settlement and there is evidence of seasonal movement of populations, as well as significant enhancements in the sophistication of handicrafts.

== Iron Age II ==
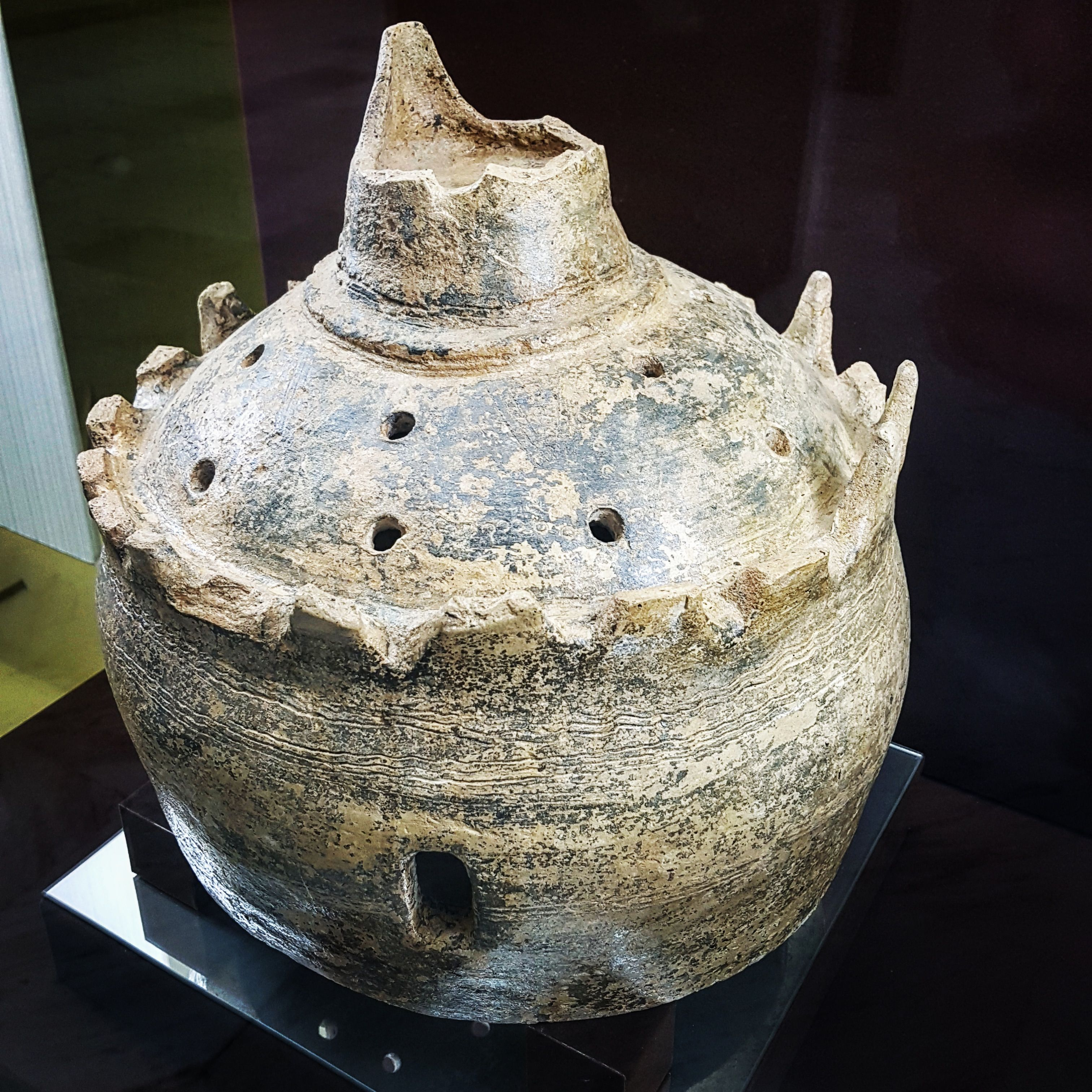
A pot, discovered in the Iron Age building at Bidaa bint Saud and on display at the Al Ain National Museum. It is thought to be an incense burner.

The Iron Age II period saw the rapid growth in the number of settlements throughout southeastern Arabia, not only in coastal but also inland areas. It also was a time when a more structured society and communities emerged, with evidence of social ritual, administration and religious practices.

Extensive evidence of Iron Age II settlement has been found throughout the UAE, particularly at Muweilah, Thuqeibah, Bidaa bint Saud, as well as Rumailah and Qattara in Al Ain. The development of increasingly complex irrigation ditches and waterways, falaj (plural aflaj) took place during this time and finds at Bidaa bint Saud and Thuqeibah date back to the Iron Age II period – pre-dating finds of qanat waterways in Iran. Early finds of aflaj, particularly those around the desert city of Al Ain, have been cited as the earliest evidence of the construction of these waterways. More and more complex systems of irrigation evolved and, in the Iron Age II era, we start to see the emergence of centralised authority imposed over the most precious resource known to man at the time.

It is thought nearby Bidaa bint Saud became an important site during the Iron Age, both as a caravan stop and as a settled community of farmers that used the falaj irrigation system there. Two of these irrigation passages have been partly excavated at Bidaa bint Saud, with a number of sections remaining in reasonable condition. In one of the excavations, a number of sandstone-lined shaft holes were discovered, as well as a stepped underground access point and a large open cistern. Evidence of formerly irrigated land has also been found at the site.

Rumailah, today part of Al Ain, was a major Iron Age II settlement dated from around 1,100–500 BCE. Finds at Rumailah include distinctive pottery adorned with snake patterns, similar to finds at Qusais, Masafi and the major Iron and Bronze Ages; metallurgical production centre at Saruq Al Hadid, as well as chlorite vessels decorated with turtles alternating with trees, similar to finds from Qidfa' in Fujairah, Qusais in Dubai and Al-Hajar in Bahrain.

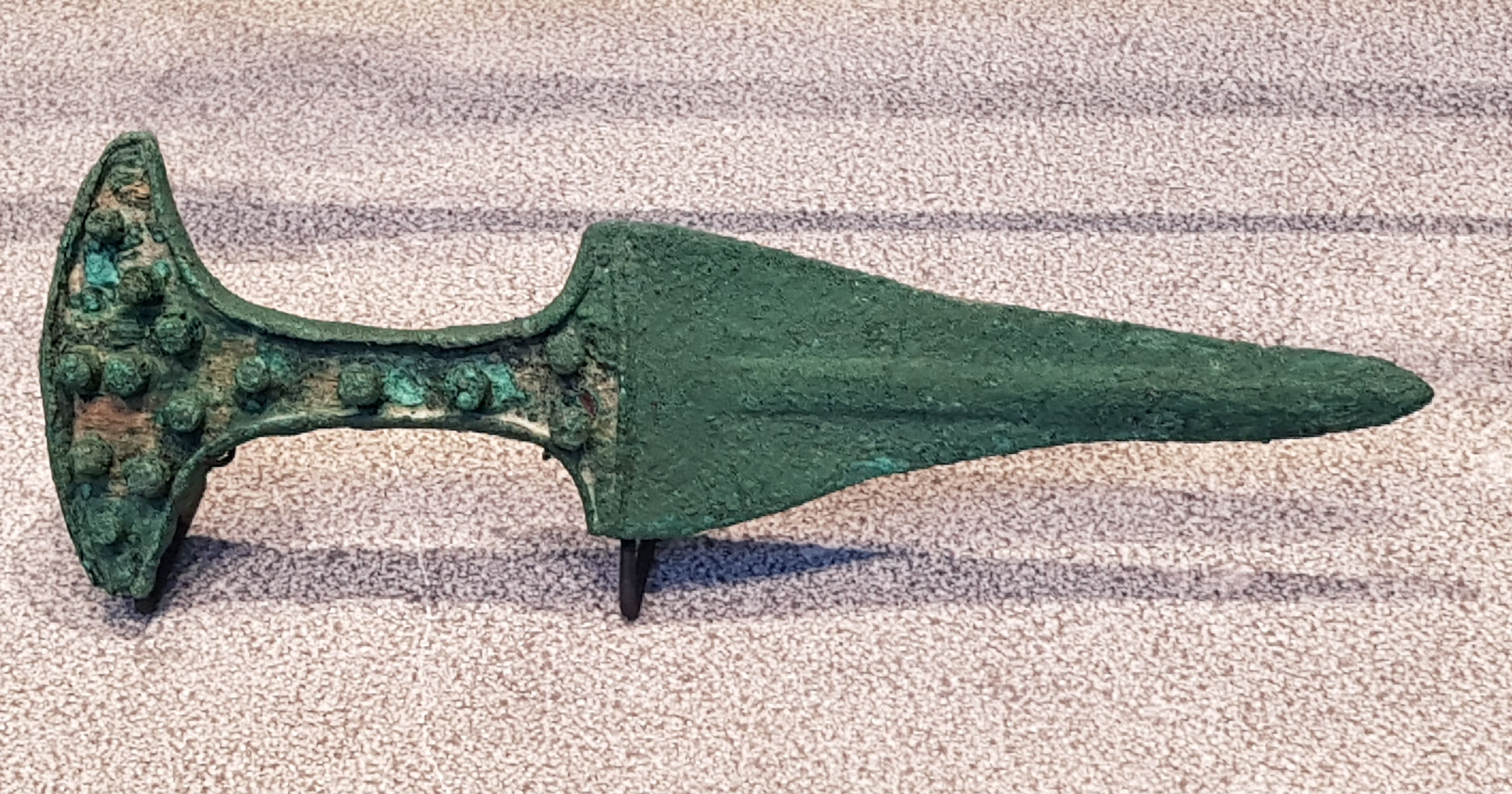
An Iron Age dagger, dated to 1,000 BCE, from Qattara. Displayed at the Louvre Abu Dhabi on loan from Al Ain Museum.

A number of Iron Age swords and axe-heads, as well as distinctive seal moulds, were also recovered from the site. A number of bronze arrowheads were also found. The Iron Age buildings found at Rumailah are typical of those in the region, at Iron Age I and II sites such as Al Thuqeibah and Muweilah, with a number of row dwellings, although lacking the perimeter walls found at Thuqeibah. A columned hall at Rumailah provides a further link to Muweilah, while a number of pyramidal seals found there echo with similar objects discovered at Bidaa bint Saud.

Radiocarbon dating artefacts found at Muweilah puts the settlement's original date of establishment at between 850 and 800 BC and it enjoyed a brief heyday before being destroyed in a fire around 600 BCE. Constructed in the main from interlocked mud bricks and mud/stone brick walls, the walled settlement itself surrounds a large walled enclosure with seven buildings, thought to have provided living quarters as well as an administrative centre. This central building contained at least twenty columns and has been a rich trove for archaeologists, with extensive finds of painted and spouted vessels, iron weapons and hundreds of bronze pieces.

Enabled by the domestication of the camel in the region, thought to have taken place around 1,000 BCE, Muweilah's trade included the manufacture of copper goods, with "extensive casting spillage from the manufacture of copper items found throughout the site". Muweilah is relatively unique in its early and extensive adoption of iron goods, thought to have been imported from Iran. Hundreds of grinding stones indicate the consumption of both barley and wheat. Although now some 15 km inland today, it is thought that in its heyday, Muweilah would have been located on a khor or creek. In its prime, around 850 BCE, Muweilah was a busy and productive major inland settlement. Artefacts recovered from Muweilah are contiguous to those found from the same period at Tell Abraq and other Iron Age settlements, evidence of an emerging uniform material across the settled areas of the time.

The Iron Age II period also saw the construction of fortifications, with a number of towers and other buildings offering protection to aflaj and the crops they watered. Hili 14 in Al Ain, Madhab Fort and Awhala Fort in Fujairah as well as Jebel Buhais near Madam in Sharjah and Rafaq in the Wadi Qor in Ras Al Khaimah are all fortifications dating to this time.

=== Iron Age aflaj ===
Recent finds of pottery in Thuqeibah and Madam have further linked the development of early aflaj (plural for falaj, the word used to denote waterways of this type in the United Arab Emirates) water systems there to an Iron Age II date, further substantiating the attribution of the innovation of these water systems to a southeastern Arabian origin based on the extensive archaeological work of Dr Wasim Takriti around the area of Al Ain.

The 2002 publication of a paper by Tikriti, The south-east Arabian origin of the falaj system, provided the first counterpoint to the long-accepted narrative, that the Qanat originated in Persia and was identified as such by accounts of the campaigns of the Assyrian King, Sargon II, in 714 BCE. Tikriti cites this and also accounts by the Greek second and third century historian Polybius as being the basis for academic attribution of the technology to Persia. He notes academics such as JC Wilkinson (1977) adopting an Iranian origin for the technology under the influence of Sargon's annals and Polybius, but points out at least seven Iron Age aflaj recently discovered in the Al Ain area of the UAE have been reliably carbon dated back to the beginning of the first millennium BCE. Additional to finds of Iron Age aflaj in Al Ain, Tikriti pointed to excavations in Al Madam, Sharjah, by the French archaeological team working there, as well as by a German team working in Maysar, in Oman. Tikriti is at pains to point out that, despite long-standing efforts since the 19th century to excavate qanat systems in Iran, no evidence has been found for any such qanat there dated earlier than the 5th century BCE. He concludes that the technology originated in South East Arabia and was likely taken to Persia, likely by the Sasanian conquest of the Oman peninsular.

Others have followed Tikriti's lead. In 2016, Rémy Boucharlat in his paper Qanāt and Falaj: Polycentric and Multi-Period Innovations Iran and the United Arab Emirates as Case Studies, asserted that the attribution of the technology to Iranians in the early first millennium BCE is a position that cannot longer be maintained, and that the carbon dating of aflaj in Oman and the UAE to the ninth century BCE by Cleuziou and evidence for such an early date provided by Tikriti are definitive. Additionally, Boucharlat maintains that no known Iranian qanat can be dated to the pre-Islamic period.

The Iron Age II innovation of the falaj in southeastern Arabia accelerated the development of oasis agriculture. Wells had clearly been core community resources since the Umm Al Nar period, protected by fortified towers and earlier Hafit burials tended to be grouped around known oasis areas. As the management and husbandry of these water resources in community settings developed, so did settlement and an effectively sedentary population with communal water management. It is thought that the bustan system of agriculture was developed at this time, where aflaj irrigation supports palm groves, which give shade to less hardy crops. This multi-layered form of agriculture brought collectivism to communities and sustaining the aflaj would have maintained the viability of the plantation. This also brought new ideas of community and the development of system of dispute resolution and the concept of rule of law would have developed in these pre-Islamic societies.

== Domestication of camels ==
Carbon dated remains of camels from Tell Abraq and artefacts from Muweilah, including the camel figurine which sits at the entrance to the Sharjah Archaeological Centre, give Iron Age I and II dates. The domestication of the camel around 1000 BCE not only made inland settlements like Muwaileh viable, it brought new impetus to conflict in the region, with the aggressive Assyrian king Shalmaneser III, claiming, (some 200 years after the first evidence of domestication of camels), 'I destroyed, I devastated, I burned with fire. 1,200 chariots, 1,200 cavalry, 20,000 soldiers of Hadad-ezer, of Aram; 1,000 camels of Gindibu, the Arabian.'

== Iron Age III and post Iron Age ==
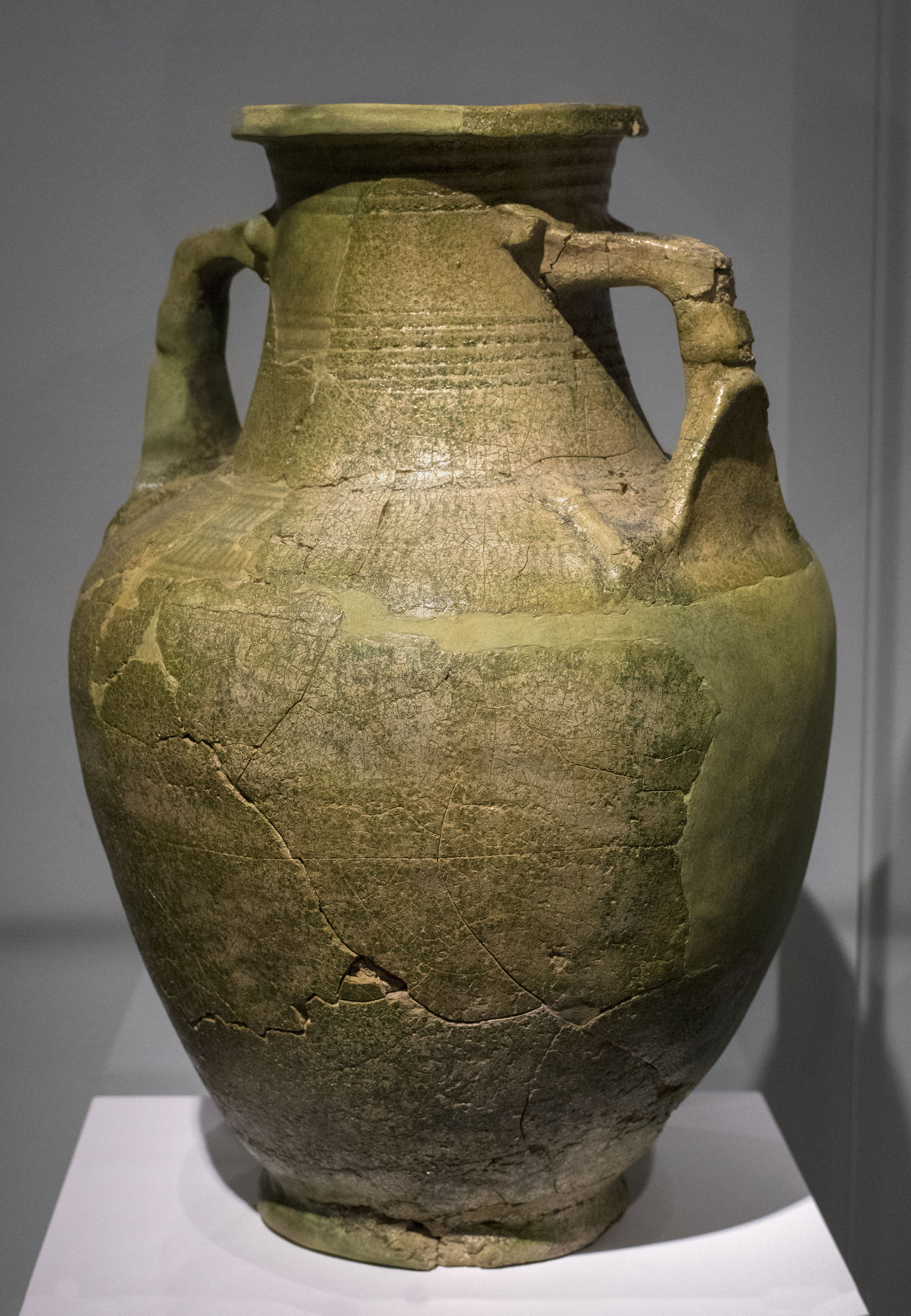
2nd century BCE Mleiha era jar from Mleiha in Sharjah, UAE

The late metallurgical production centre of Saruq Al Hadid has yielded an amazing trove, including rare finds of iron implements and weaponry which mostly date to the late Iron Age II and the transition to Iron Age III, a time when conflict appears to dominate the cultural landscape of southeastern Arabia. Evidence of Iron Age III occupation in the Emirates can be found at Tell Abraq, Shimal, Rumailah, Hili and Thuqeibah, while a number of towers and other fortifications have been dated to this time, offering protection to aflaj and their crops, including forts at Hili in Al Ain; Madhab and Awhala in Fujairah; Jebel Buhais near Madam in Sharjah and Rafaq in the Wadi Qor in Ras Al Khaimah.

The archaeological record at Saruq Al Hadid is silenced after 800 BCE, as is that at Muweilah, destroyed in a widespread fire even 200 years later. The mountain community of Masafi and the settlements around it were silenced around 600 BCE, about the same time as the abandonment of Bithnah. Finds draw a strong cultural link with the Archaemenid Persians and point to the area becoming the satrapy of Maka. The Achaemenid King Darius links the land of Qade to the Akkadian Makkan and Elamite Makkash, while texts from Persepolis indicate there is now a satrapy of Maka. Iron Age short swords from Qusais, Jebel Buhais and Rumailah mirror images of 'natives of Maka' found on the throne of Darius II at Persepolis, while ceramics found dating back to the Iron Age III period mirror those found in a number of Persian sites of the era.

According to Herodotus’ Histories, Maka supplied troops to fight with Xerxes’ army in 480 BCE. Iron Age III short swords with distinctive crescent pommels from finds at Qusais in Dubai; Buhais in Sharjah and Rumailah and Qattara in Al Ain are identical in form to that borne by the figure of a native of Maka carved in Darius II’s grave relief at Persepolis. The Achaemenid empire was to fall in its turn to the Macedonians under Alexander the Great, the Macedonian who conquered Persia but who died before he could invade the little satrapy of Maka.

The period from 300–0 BCE has been dubbed both the Mleiha and the Pre-Islamic Recent period, and follows on from the dissolution of Darius III's empire. Although the era has been called Hellenistic, Alexander the Great's conquests went no further than Persia and he left Arabia untouched. However, Macedonian coinage unearthed at Ed-Dur dates back to Alexander the Great. Contemporary Greek manuscripts have given the exports from Ed-Dur as 'pearls, purple dye, clothing, wine, gold and slaves, and a great quantity of dates'.

The most complete evidence of human settlement and community from this time is at Mleiha, where a thriving agrarian community benefited from the protection of a mudbrick fort. It was here, and during this period, that the most complete evidence of iron usage has been found, including nails, long swords and arrowheads as well as evidence of slag from smelting.

== See also ==
- Archaeology of the United Arab Emirates
- History of the United Arab Emirates
- List of Ancient Settlements in the UAE
