= Rumailah, UAE =

Archaeological site in the UAE

Al-Rumaylah
- ٱلرُّمَيْلَة (Arabic) (Arabic)
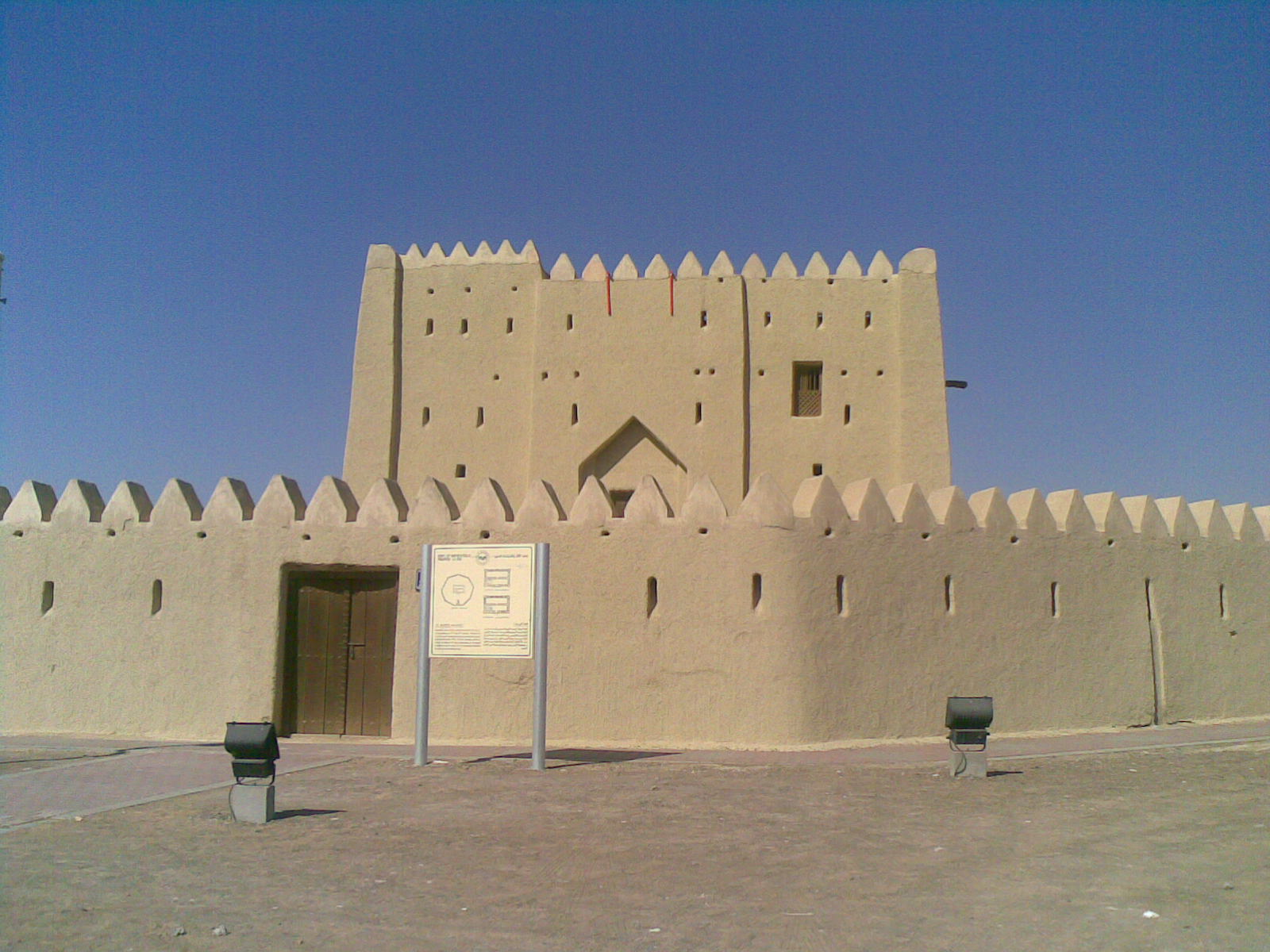
- Al-Rumailah Fort

- Location within United Arab Emirates Location within Persian Gulf Location within West and Central Asia
- 24°16′37″N 55°45′32″E
- Type: Settlement
- Cultures: Umm Al-Nar
- Location: Al Ain, Eastern Region of the Emirate of Abu Dhabi, the UAE
- Region: Tawam

History
- Built: c. 1,100–500 BCE

Site notes
- Condition: Ruined
- Owner: Public
- Public access: Yes

Rumailah (Arabic: ٱلرٌّمَيْلَة) is an archaeological site in Al Ain, Abu Dhabi, the U.A.E., as well as the site of a thick-walled coral and adobe fort, thought to date to the early 20th century.

Located 3 kilometres (1.9 miles) west of Hili Archaeological Park, the rectangular mound at Rumailah is thought to have been home to populations dating back to the late Umm Al Nar period, yielding buildings and artefacts from a more recent, major Iron Age II settlement dated from around 1,100–500 BCE.

== Archaeology ==
Finds at Rumailah include distinctive pottery adorned with snake patterns, similar to finds at Qusais and Masafi and the major Iron and Bronze Age metallurgical production centre at Saruq Al Hadid, as well as chlorite vessels decorated with turtles alternating with trees, similar to finds from Qidfa' in Fujairah, Qusais in Dubai and Al-Hajar in Bahrain.

A number of Iron Age swords and axe-heads, as well as distinctive seal moulds, were also recovered from the site. A number of bronze arrowheads were also found. The Iron Age buildings found at Rumailah are typical of those found in the region, at Iron Age I and II sites such as Thuqeibah and Muweilah, with a number of row dwellings, although lacking the perimeter walls found at Thuqeibah. A columned hall at Rumailah provides a further link to Muweilah, while a number of pyramidal seals found at Rumailah find an echo with similar objects discovered at Bidaa Bint Saud.

Late Iron Age weaponry found at Rumailah (as well as Qattara and Buhais) supports the theory that the area, once known to the Sumerians as Magan, was known to the Achaemenids as the satrapy of Maka. Evidenced both in inscriptions and texts from Persepolis, Maka supplied troops to Xerxes to fight in his army in 480 BCE according to Herodotus' Histories. Iron Age short swords with distinctive crescent pommels of a type found in Qattara are identical in form to that borne by the figure of a native of Maka carved in Darius II’s grave relief at Persepolis.

== See also ==
- List of Ancient Settlements in the UAE
- Qattara Oasis
