= List of ancient settlements in the UAE =

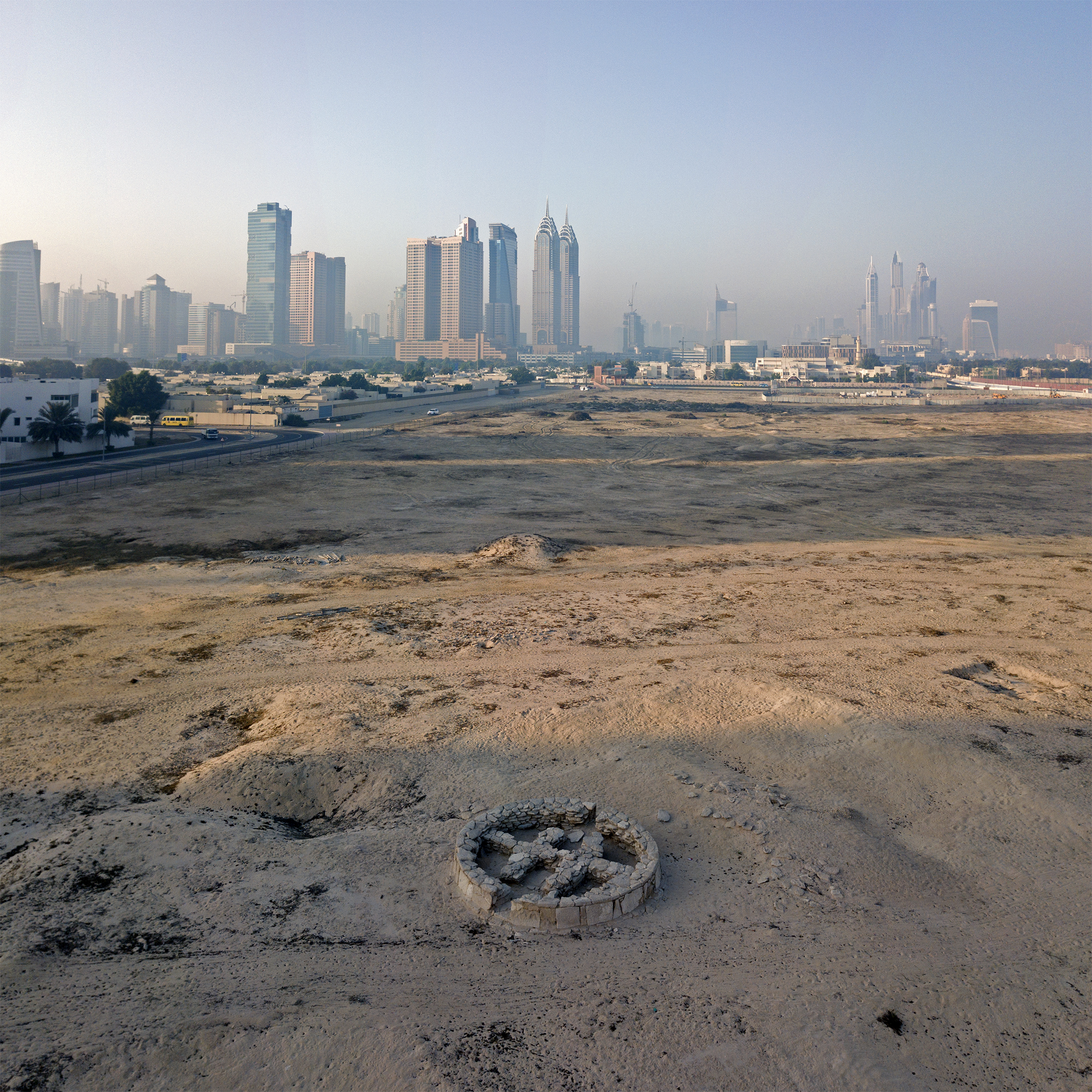
Umm Al Nar tomb at Al Sufouh, Dubai

The territory currently known as the United Arab Emirates was formerly populated by inhabitants of a number of coastal and inland settlements, with human remains pointing to a pattern of transmigration and settlement as far back as 125,000 years. Prehistoric Arabian settlements in the UAE took place in the Neolithic, with a number of distinctive eras of ancient settlement including the Stone Age Arabian Bifacial and Ubaid cultures from 5000 to 3100 BCE; the Hafit period with its distinctive beehive shaped tombs and Jemdet Nasr pottery, from 3200 to 2600 BCE; the Umm Al Nar period from 2600 to 2000 BCE; the Wadi Suq Culture from 2000 to 1300 BCE and the three Iron Ages of the UAE.

Iron Age I spanned 1200–1000 BCE; Iron Age II from 1000 to 600 BCE and Iron Age III from 600 to 300 BCE. This was followed by the Hellenistic Mleiha era (also known as the PIR - Pre-Islamic Recent), from 300 BCE onwards through to the Islamic era which commenced with the culmination of the 7th century Ridda Wars.

The remains of settlements, burials and other extensive evidence of human habitation throughout these eras is littered throughout the UAE, with many extensive finds of rich materials in the shape of pottery, jewellery, weapons and both human and animal remains providing archaeologists and researchers with an increasingly sophisticated picture of longstanding involvement in regional trade alongside nomadic cultures eking out a living from the frequently arid and inhospitable desert and mountain environment of the UAE.

== Settlements ==
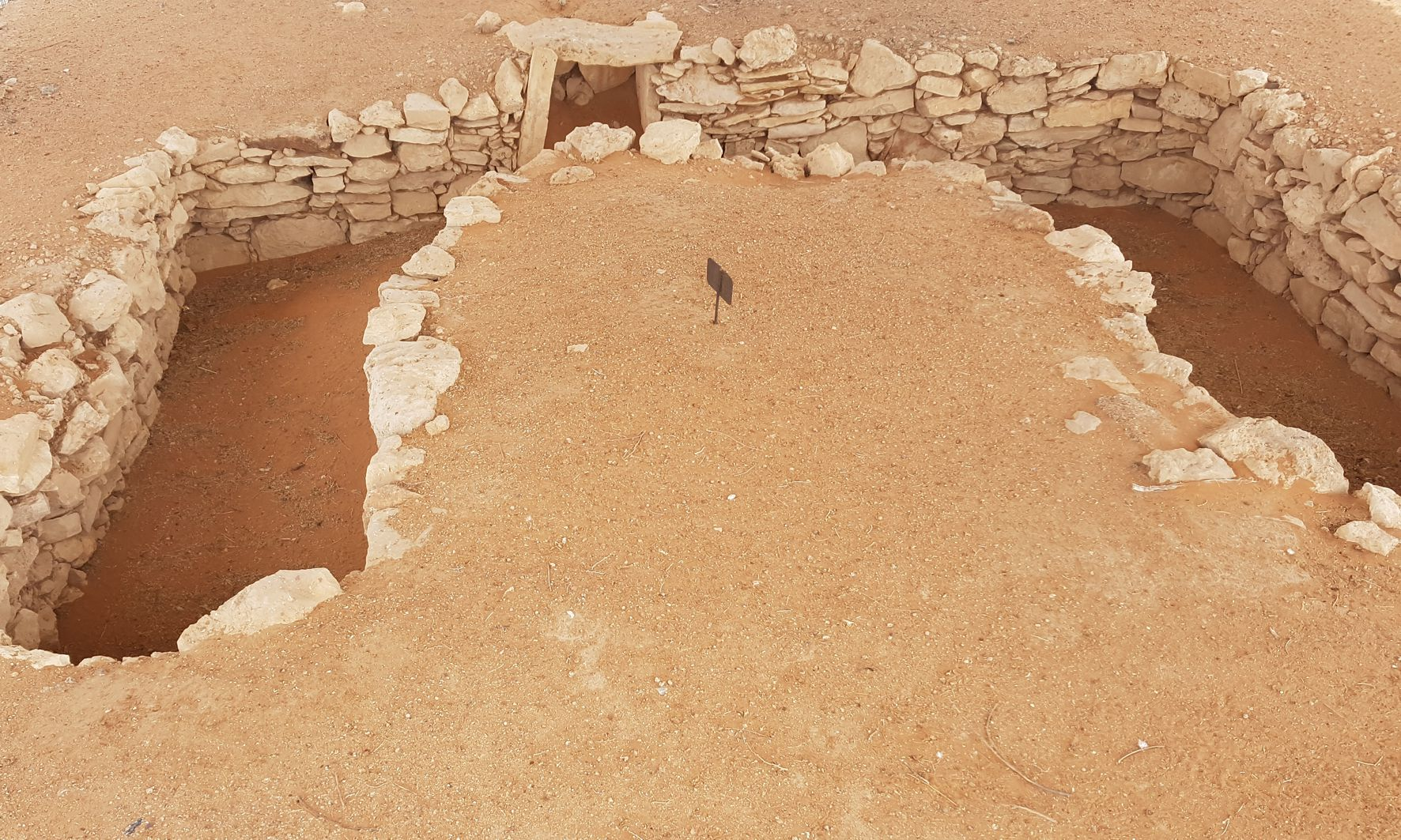
Wadi Suq burial at Jebel Buhais

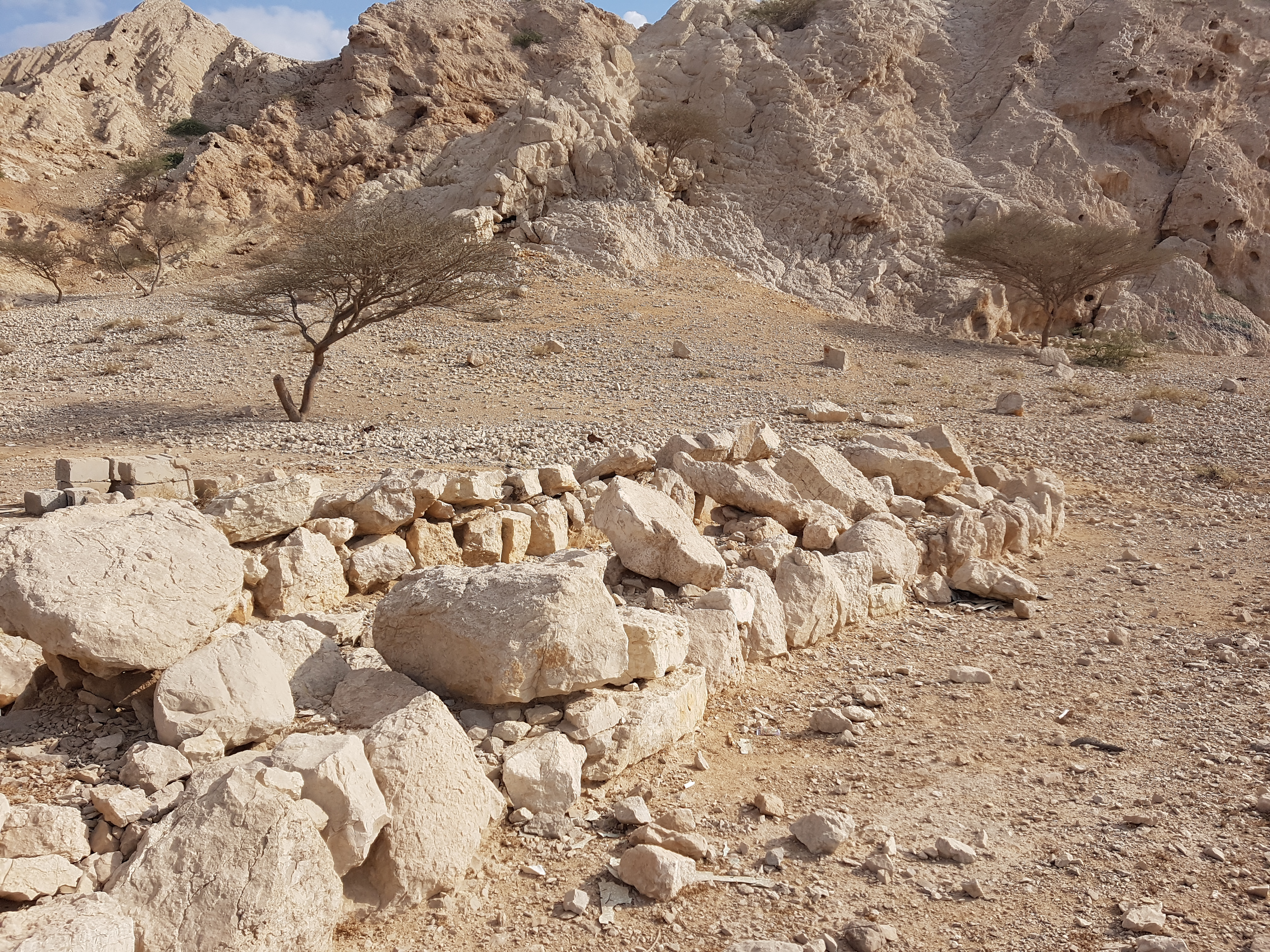
Wadi Suq era burial at Shimal

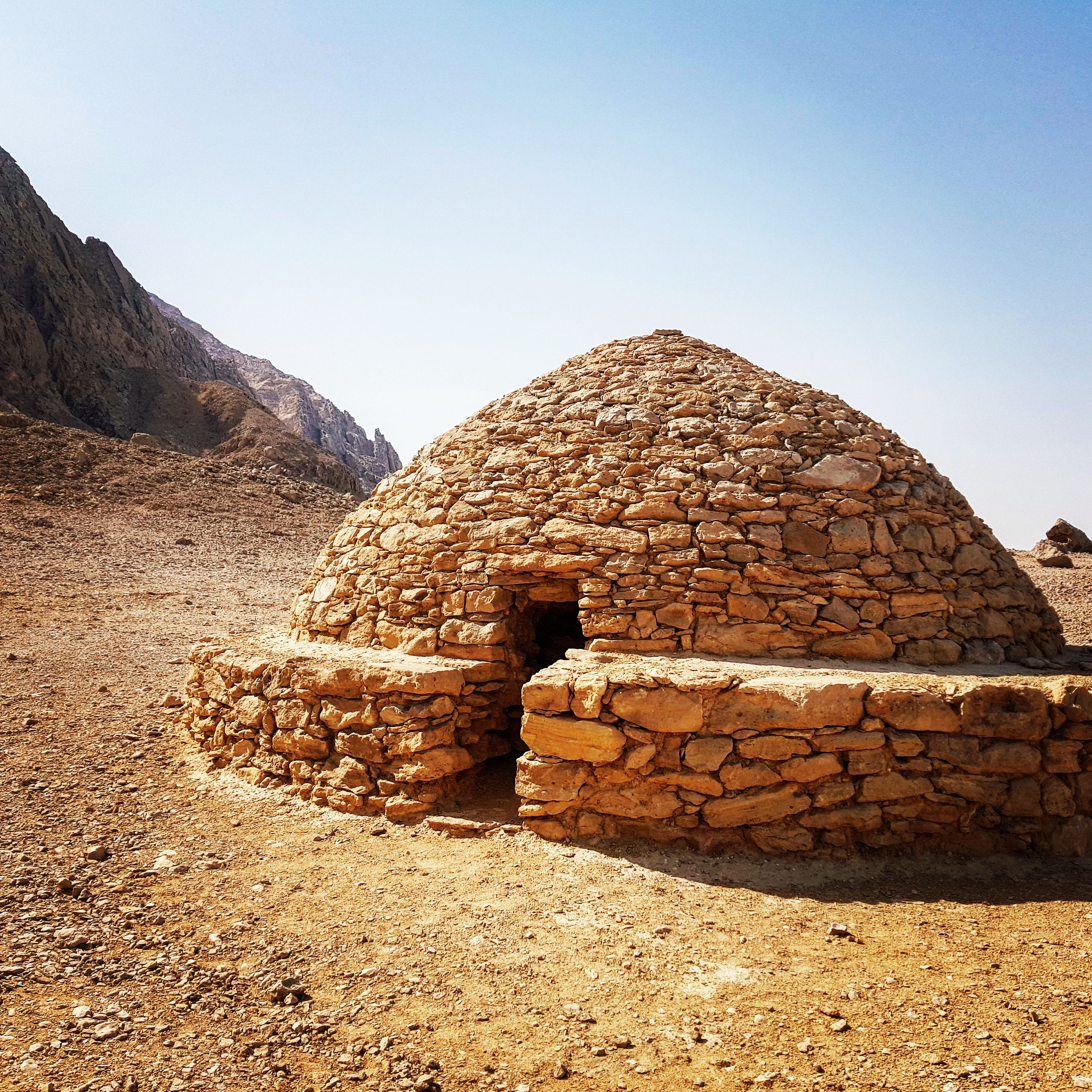
Hafit period beehive tomb at Jebel Hafeet

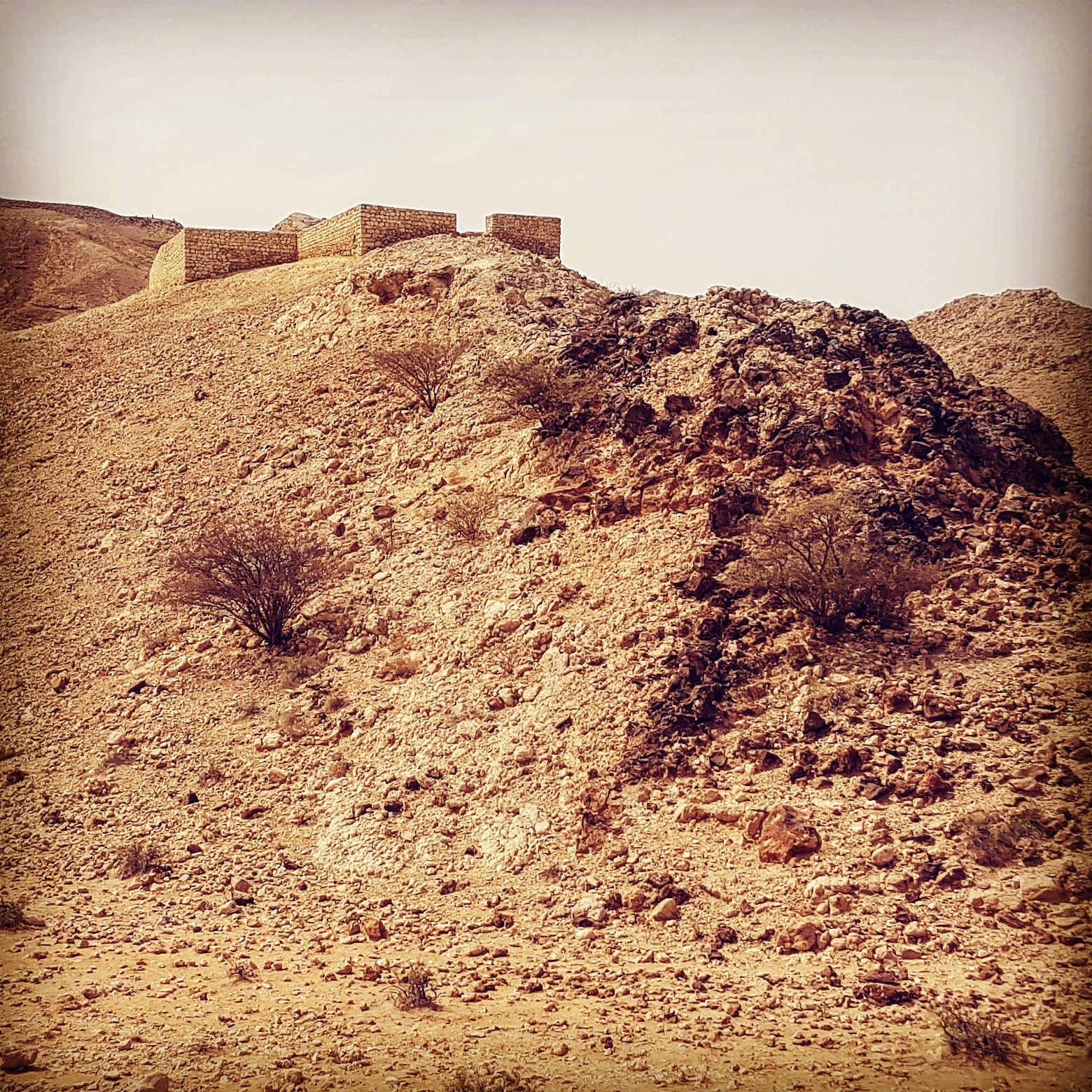
Iron Age building at Jebel Buhais

Settlement	Emirate (modern)	Populated	Notes
Al Ashoosh	Dubai	2500–2000 BCE	Umm Al Nar site with no burial discovered.
Al Madam	Sharjah	1100–300 BCE	Iron Age aflaj (water systems)
Al Sufouh	Dubai	2500–2000 BCE	Umm Al Nar site with tomb
Bidaa bint Saud	Abu Dhabi	3200–2600 BCE	Hafit and Iron Age burials
Bithnah	Fujairah	2000–300 BCE	Wadi Suq burials and Iron Age petroglyphs
Ed-Dur	Umm Al Quwain	5300 BCE–300 CE	Major ancient city/settlement spanning Ubeid period through Umm Al Nar, Wadi Suq to Iron Age and Pre-Islamic
Hili	Abu Dhabi	3200–2600 BCE	Hafit and Umm Al Nar tombs
Jebel Buhais	Sharjah	5000–1300 BCE	Necropolis featuring Stone, Bronze, Iron and Hellenistic age burials
Jebel Faya	Sharjah	125,000 BCE	Neolithic, Paleolithic, Stone, Bronze Age finds (See Mleiha)
Jebel Hafeet	Abu Dhabi	3200-2600 BC	Gave its name to the Hafit period, extensive beehive tombs, with some reconstructed
Julfar	Ras Al Khaimah	1300-1650 CE	Precursor settlement to Ras Al Khaimah
Jumeirah	Dubai	900-1100 CE	Remains of early Islamic era souq, houses and caravanserai
Kalba	Sharjah	2500–1300 BCE	Umm Al Nar settlement
Kush	Ras Al Khaimah	600-1400 CE	Late pre-Islamic to Islamic settlement
Masafi	Ras Al Khaimah	1300–300 BCE	Iron Age finds
Mleiha	Sharjah	5300–300 BCE	Settlement through Ubaid, Hafit, Umm Al Nar, Wadi Suq and Iron Age to Hellenistic Mleiha & pre-Islamic periods
Muweilah	Sharjah	1100–600 BCE	Iron Age II settlement
Qattara Oasis	Abu Dhabi	1800–1500 BCE	Bronze and Iron Age settlement
Rumailah	Abu Dhabi	2000–1000 BCE	Umm Al Nar through to Iron Age II settlement
Saruq Al Hadid	Dubai	2600 BCE–1000 CE	Occupation since Umm Al Nar period, major Iron Age metallurgical centre
Seih Al Harf	Ras Al Khaimah	2000–1300 BCE	Extensive Wadi Suq burial site
Shimal	Ras Al Khaimah	2500–1300 BCE	Umm Al Nar/Wadi Suq burials
Tell Abraq	Umm Al Quwain/Sharjah	2500–400 BCE	Major settlement, spanning Umm Al Nar, Wadi Suq and Iron Age
Thuqeibah	Sharjah	1100–400 BCE	Iron Age II and III settlement
Umm Al Nar	Abu Dhabi	2600–2000 BCE	Burials and settlement defined the Umm Al Nar period

== See also ==
- List of cultural property of national significance in the United Arab Emirates
- List of cities of the ancient Near East
