= Hili Archaeological Park =

Archaeological park

Hili Assemblage
UNESCO World Heritage Site
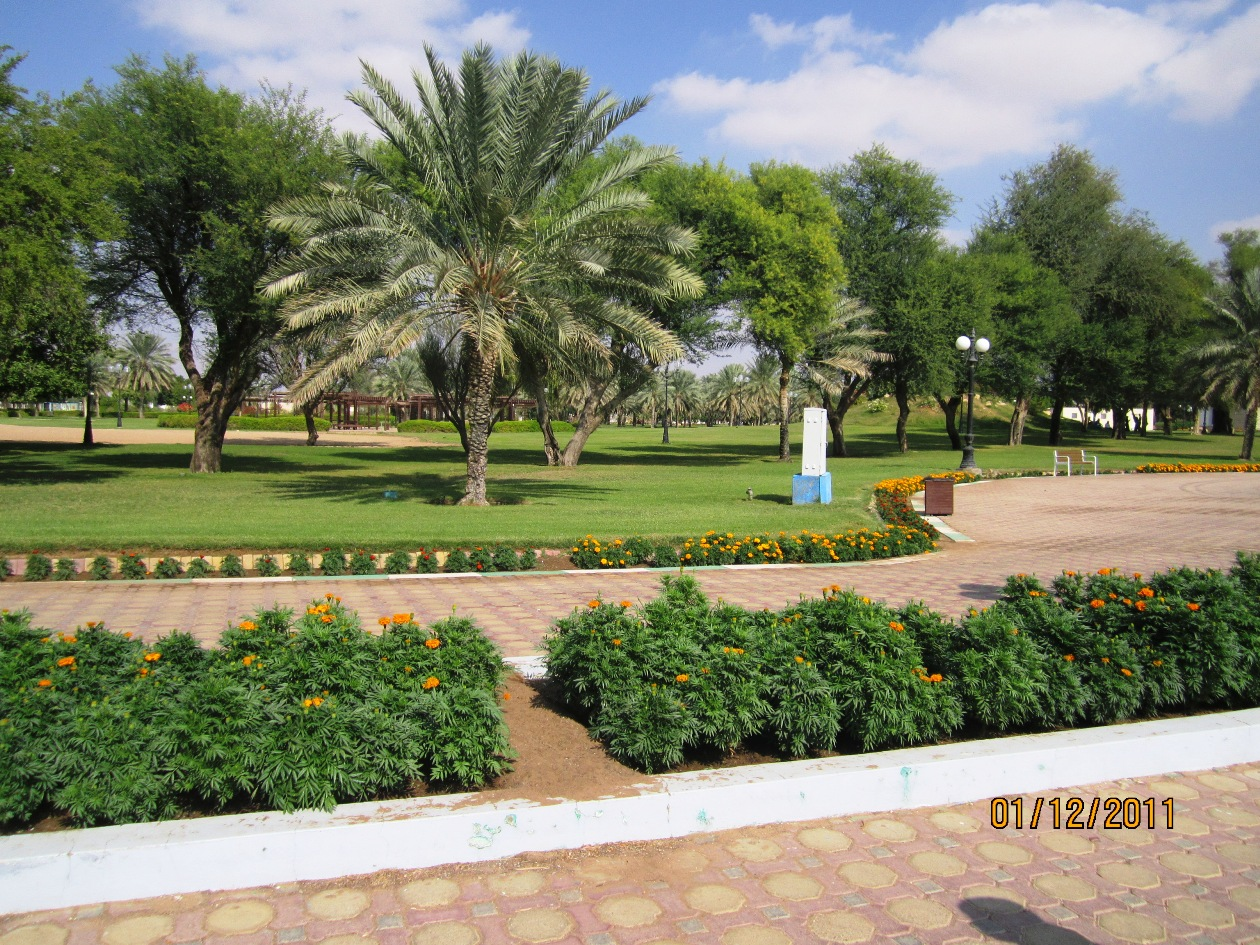
- Park

- Location within United Arab Emirates
- Location: Al Ain, Emirate of Abu Dhabi, United Arab Emirates
- Part of: Cultural Sites of Al Ain (Hafit, Hili, Bidaa Bint Saud and Oases Areas)
- Includes: 1. Hili Archaeological Park; 2. Hili 2; 3. Hili North Tomb A 4. Hili North Tomb BTS; 5. Rumailah Site
- Criteria: Cultural: (iii), (iv), (v)
- Reference: 1343
- Inscription: 2011 (35th Session)
- Coordinates: 24°17′34.38″N 55°47′23.69″E

Hili Archaeological Park (Arabic: حَدِيْقَة آثَار ٱلْهِيْلِي, romanized: Ḥadīqat Āthar Al-Hīlī) is the location of a Bronze Age site in Al Ain, Emirate of Abu Dhabi, the United Arab Emirates.

== Description and history ==
Hili is the largest Bronze Age site in the UAE and dates from the 3rd millennium BC. Other remains include settlements, tombs, and a falaj dating from the Iron Age. Some of the site is located outside the park in a protected area. Finds from the site can be seen in the Al Ain National Museum in central Al Ain. The Hili Grand Tomb is a tower measuring 12 m (39 ft) in diameter that has been reconstructed. The tombs belong to the Umm al-Nar culture.

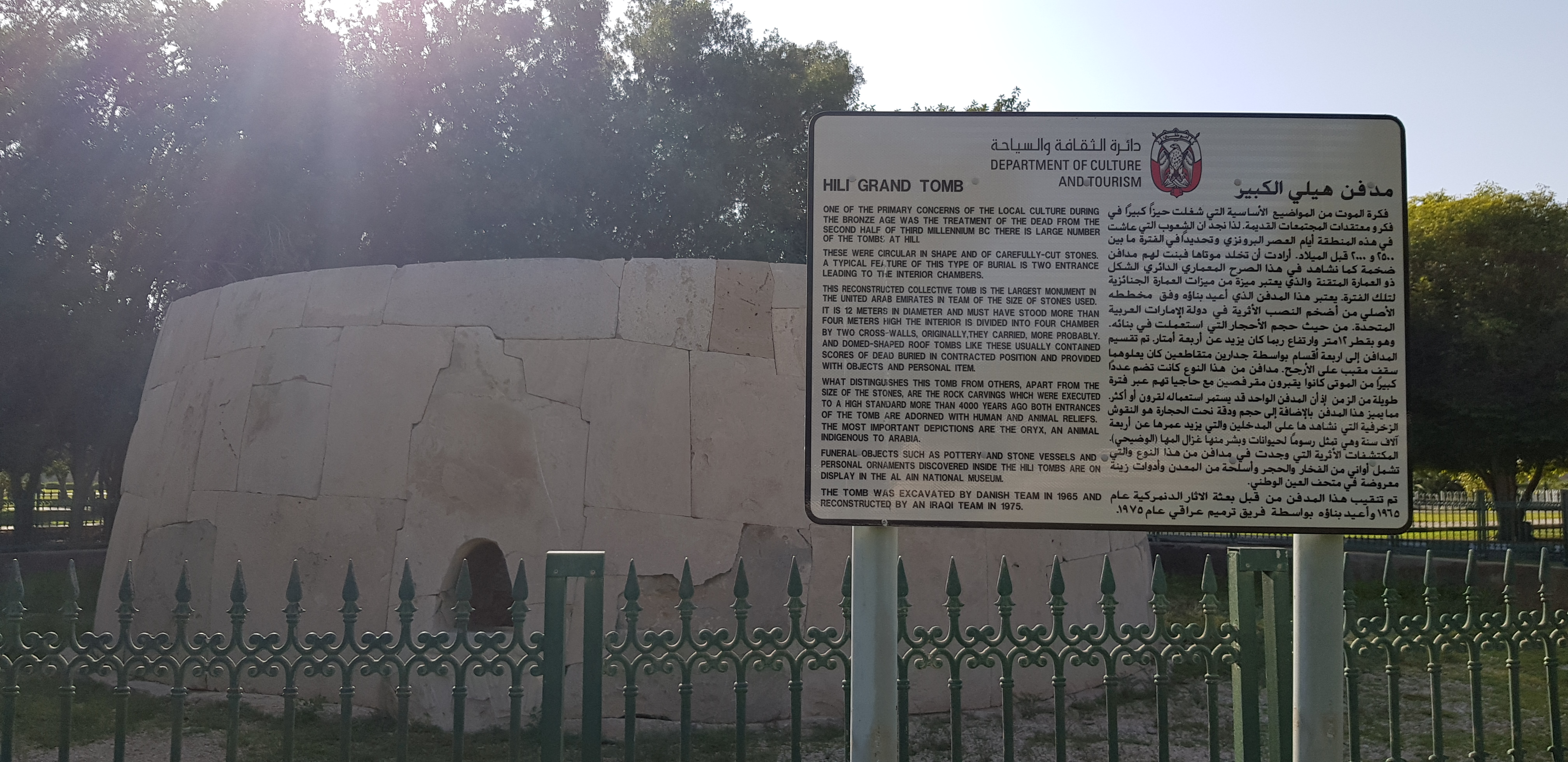
Hili Grand tomb

In May 2019 the Abu Dhabi Department of Culture & Tourism reported that fingerprints about 3000 years old were found at Hili II. They apparently belonged to craftsmen who constructed a wall at the site.

The earliest settlement at Hili, known as Hili 8, dates to around 3000 BC and has yielded some of the earliest evidence of oasis agriculture in south-eastern Arabia, including the cultivation of wheat, barley and the date palm. The aflaj irrigation channels at Hili, dug during the first millennium BC, are among the oldest known examples of this water-management technology.

== World Heritage status ==
In 2011, Hili was inscribed on the UNESCO World Heritage List as one of the components of the Cultural Sites of Al Ain (Hafit, Hili, Bidaa Bint Saud and Oases Areas), the first property in the United Arab Emirates to be granted World Heritage status.

== See also ==
- Al Ain Oasis
- Tawam (region)
  - Al-Buraimi
- Archaeological Sites of Bat, Al-Khutm and Al-Ayn
- Hafit period
- Ibri
- List of Ancient Settlements in the UAE
- Qattara Oasis
- Rumailah, UAE
