= Tawam (region) =

Historical oasis region in Eastern Arabia

Tawam (Arabic: تَوَام, romanized: Tawām), also Tuwwam, or Tu'am, is a historical region in Eastern Arabia that stretched from, or was located between, the Western Hajar Mountains to the Persian Gulf coast, nowadays forming parts of the United Arab Emirates and western Oman. Although traditionally associated with the Buraimi Oasis (Arabic: وَاحَة ٱلْبُرَيْمِي, romanized: Wāḥat Al-Buraymī), by historians working from documentary sources available in the 1950s and 60s, Tu'am is now thought to refer to the Christian patriachate of St Thomas the Apostle of the East and the location of the principal city and pearling centre on Siniyah island in modern Umm Al Quwain on the Western seaboard of the UAE.

It is now believed to span the area marked by the twin settlements of Al Ain and Buraimi on the UAE-Omani border, with the former in the UAE and the latter in Oman, and with Siniyah on the Western seaboard of the UAE.

== Etymology and geography ==
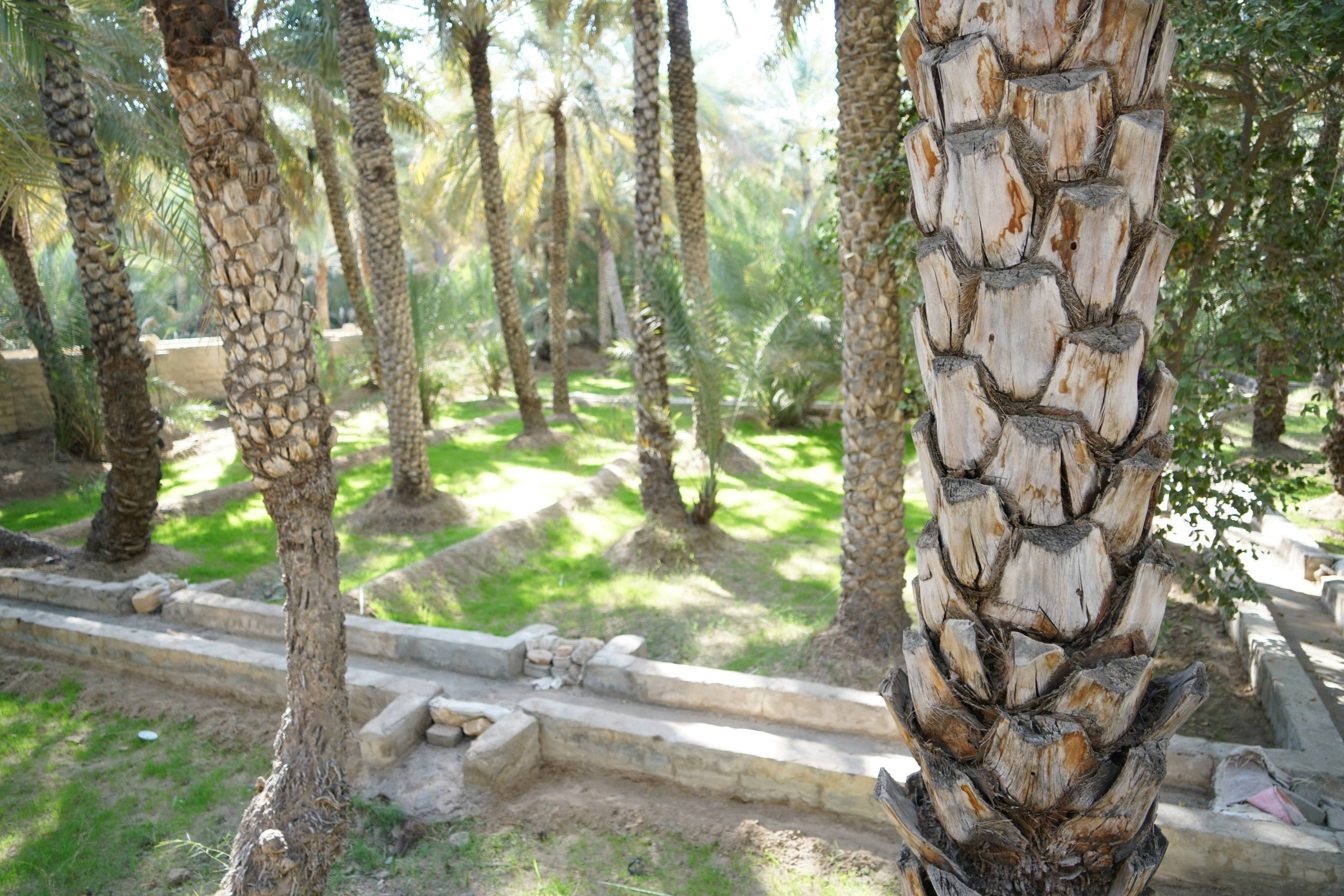
A falaj at Al Ain Oasis, one of a number found in this region

Al Ain is the main settlement in the Eastern Region of the Emirate of Abu Dhabi, located on the country's eastern border with Oman, where the adjacent town of Buraimi is located. The region is located to the west of the Western Hajar Mountains and the Gulf of Oman, and in the vicinity of the Rub' al-Khali Desert. On the coast of the Arabian or Persian Gulf lies Jumeirah in the Emirate of Dubai, which was probably part of this region, as well as the major pearling town and early religious site now being uncovered at Siniyah.

The word 'Tawam' means 'twins' in Arabic, and was thought to refer to a pair of aflaj (water channels) in the Buraimi region, as identified from the works of people like Salil ibn Raziq in the 19th century, Al-Tabari and Al-Muqaddasi in the 10th century. However, contemporary archaeological and archival research has strongly identified Tu'am with Thomas the Apostle, particularly after the recent archaeological work carried out at Siniyah by Timothy Power, an archaeologist and professor based in Abu Dhabi who helped to found the Buraimi Oasis Landscape Archaeology Project.

In the mid-19th century, an Omani scholar, Salil ibn Raziq, basically said that Buraimi used to be called Tawam. People picked up on that but have never critically examined the earlier sources. Al Tabari writes of a Persian sphere of influence along the Batinah plain of Oman and an Arab sphere of influence in the interior with its capital at a place called Tawam. In that he deals with the events of 893/94, in which there is a dispute amongst different local factions about who should rule in Oman. One of these factions approaches the Abbasids for outside assistance. The faction who do this are called the Bani Sama and they are based in Buraimi before they base themselves in Sohar, call themselves the Wajihid Dynasty and assume the leadership of the whole region.

— Timothy Power.

The identification of Tu’am with Al Ain and Buraimi was reproduced uncritically by British colonialists and Arab nationalists in the 1960s and ‘70s, which coincided with the creation of the United Arab Emirates. The result was a roundabout and hospital in Al Ain named after Tu’am, an attempt to give deep roots to the new nation.

— Timothy Power,

Hafit {Tuwwam} abounds in palm trees; it lies in the direction of Hajar {Al Hasa}, and the mosque is in the markets ... Dibba and Julfar, both in the direction of the Hajar, are close to the sea ... Tuwwam has been dominated by a branch of the Quraysh ...

— Al-Muqaddasi, 985 CE.

== History and prehistory ==
Archaeological remains dating to the Bronze Age and beyond, like at Rumailah, Hili and Jebel Hafeet, have been found in this region. In ancient times, the region was reportedly used by Arabs as a place of gathering, and like Dibba, it was taxed by the Julanda, who were clients of the Sasanians, reporting to the Persian marzban (military governor) based at Rustaq in what is now Oman.

Like Dibba and present-day Ras Al Khaimah, the region witnessed events relevant to the history of Islam during the Rashidun, Umayyad and Abbasid eras.

Around the Islamic Golden Age in the Middle Ages, the region, with its capital at 'Tawam', was an important sphere of influence for Arabs. Ceramics and other materials found here were believed to have been imported from Mesopotamia, India and China. A mosque, considered to be the oldest in the country, was found in the vicinity of the Sheikh Khalifa Mosque in Al-Ain by Dr Walid Al Tikriti, besides a falaj, a group of houses, and a village dating to the 9th or 10th century.

Being strategically located near the Western Hajar, the area was an important stop for people and caravans traveling between the mountains and other parts of Arabia, such as Al-Hasa. Not only was the area, being rich in date palms, important for trade, but it was also used by certain people for smuggling slaves, women or children, years before the foundation of the UAE.
