= Masafi =

Masafi مسافي
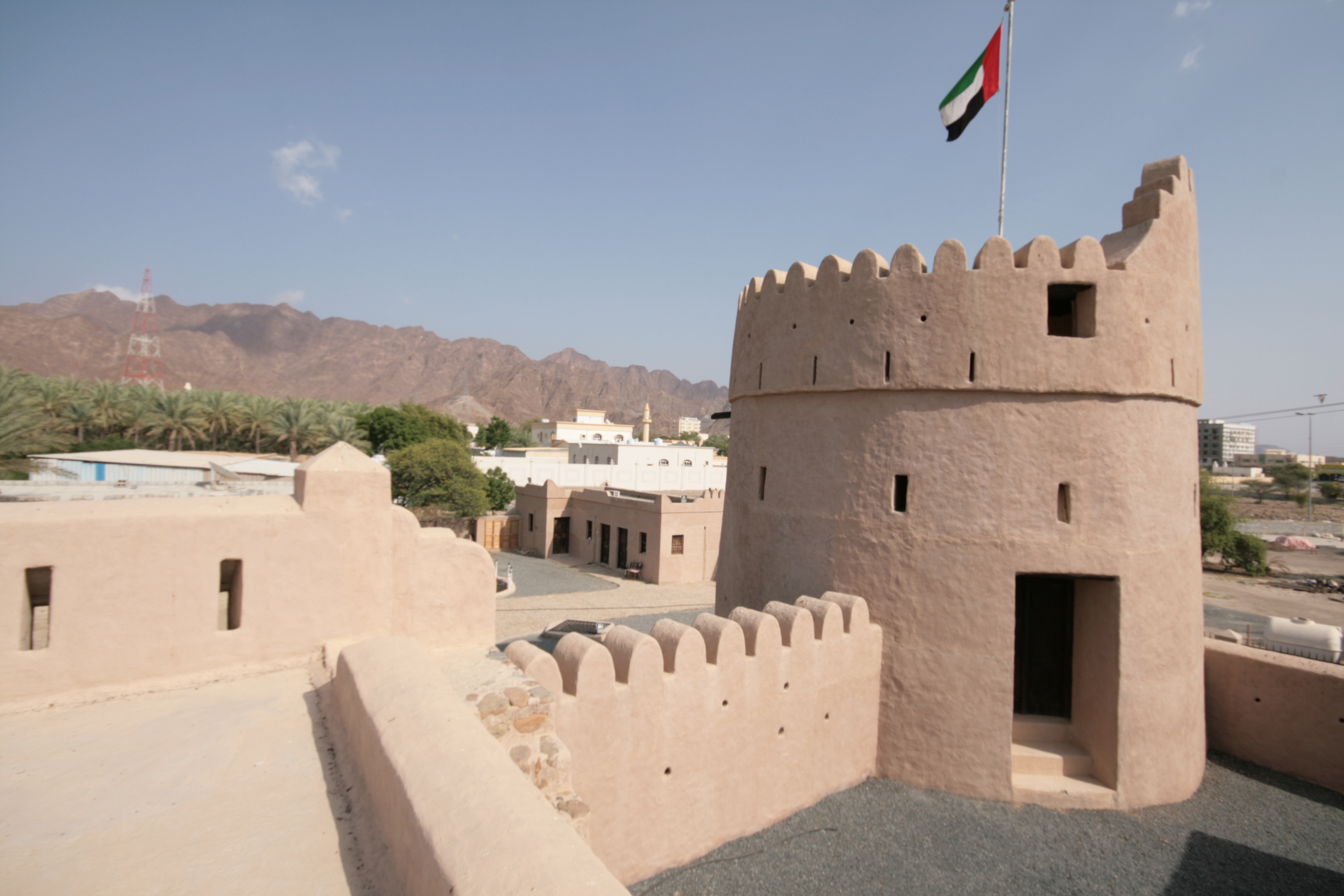
- Masafi Fort

- Location within United Arab Emirates
- Coordinates: 25°18′48″N 56°9′46″E
- Country: United Arab Emirates
- Emirate: Ras Al Khaimah, Fujairah

Area
  - Total: 24.25 km^{2} (9.36 sq mi)
- Elevation: 567 m (1,860 ft)

Population (2017-07-01)
  - Total: 7,637
- Time zone: UTC+4

Masafi (Arabic: مسافي) is a village located on the edge of the Hajar Mountains in the United Arab Emirates. It sits at the inland entrance of the Wadi Ham, which runs down to Fujairah City. The border between the emirates of Fujairah and Ras Al Khaimah runs through the town, which houses a barracks used by the United Arab Emirates Armed Forces.

Before the construction of the Sharjah to Kalba road and the 'truck road' between Dibba and the 311 highway at Ras al-Khaimah, the road through Masafi was the only route from the interior to the East Coast of the UAE. The road from the inland town of Dhaid splits at Masafi, leading to Dibba to the north and Fujairah City to the south. The road connecting Masafi, Fujairah and Dibba was constructed in the 1960s by the Trucial Oman Scouts.

== History ==
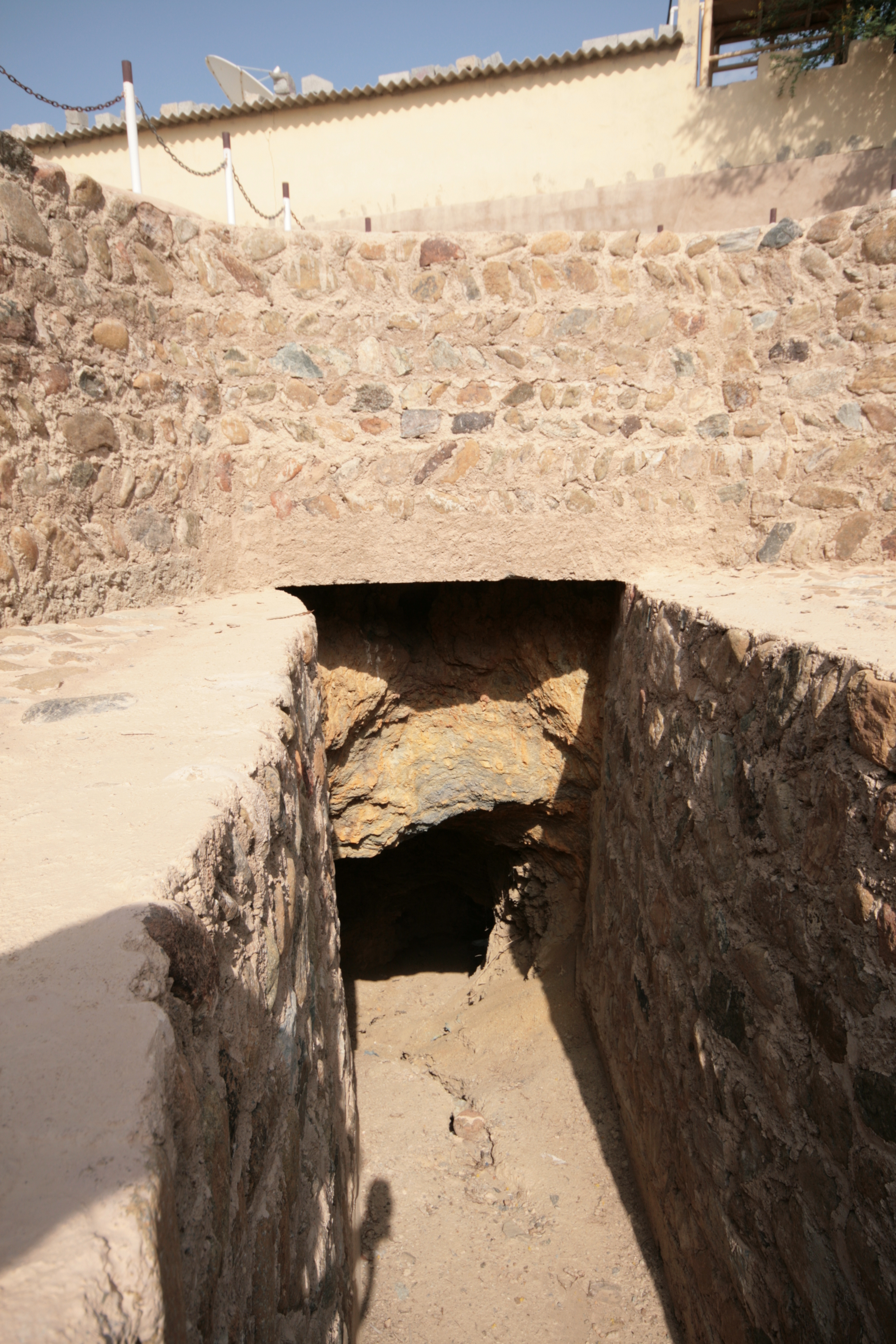
A Falaj (man-made underground aquifer) at Masafi Fort

A number of excavations point to Bronze Age habitation in Masafi, as well as a thriving Iron Age settlement with a sophisticated system of irrigation and water resource management, which appears to have been abandoned during the Iron Age III period at approximately 600 BCE.

There is evidence of ritual and community development during the Iron Age at Masafi, as well as of a snake cult which is also seen in many other Iron Age settlements across the UAE, including Saruq Al Hadid, Muweilah, nearby Bithnah, Ed-Dur, Tell Abraq, Rumailah and Qusais.

Masafi has a recently restored (2012) stone and adobe fort, smaller but architecturally similar to the nearby Al Bithnah Fort, also restored as part of the same project. The fort encloses an exceptional example of a falaj, an underground waterway constructed to channel water from the mountains to the oasis towns of the interior.

At the turn of the 20th century, Masafi was a village of some 50 houses, with the villagers being split between the Sharqiyin and Mazari tribes, with some 30 cattle, 350 sheep and 5,000 date palms.

Masafi was the site of a rough airstrip used by the Trucial Oman Scouts.

== Climate ==
Climate data for Masafi, United Arab Emirates
Month	Jan	Feb	Mar	Apr	May	Jun	Jul	Aug	Sep	Oct	Nov	Dec	Year
Mean daily maximum °F (°C)	83.5 (28.6)	86.0 (30.0)	94.1 (34.5)	105.4 (40.8)	109.2 (42.9)	111.7 (44.3)	109.9 (43.3)	110.8 (43.8)	107.4 (41.9)	101.7 (38.7)	93.4 (34.1)	85.1 (29.5)	99.8 (37.7)
Mean daily minimum °F (°C)	45.7 (7.6)	44.1 (6.7)	52.5 (11.4)	56.1 (13.4)	64.4 (18.0)	72.9 (22.7)	78.1 (25.6)	76.5 (24.7)	70.9 (21.6)	64.9 (18.3)	57.0 (13.9)	46.4 (8.0)	60.8 (16.0)
Average precipitation inches (mm)	0.85 (21.5)	0.94 (23.8)	0.27 (6.9)	0.58 (14.8)	0.0 (0.0)	0.00 (0.1)	0.02 (0.4)	0.09 (2.4)	0.19 (4.7)	0.31 (7.9)	0.12 (3.0)	0.37 (9.4)	3.74 (94.9)

== Water bottling ==
Masafi is a branded producer of bottled water, juices and other consumer goods such as tissue paper. The company's 250,000 m^{2} bottling plant is located in the northern part of the town, part of Ras Al Khaimah. Capable of producing 90,000 bottles an hour, the plant produced, until 2017, the only bottled water in the UAE labelled as mineral water, changing its branding to identify as 'Deep Earth Water'.

In 1980, the company was the sponsor of the first Masafi Car Rally, a popular annual event no longer held.

== Masafi Friday Market ==
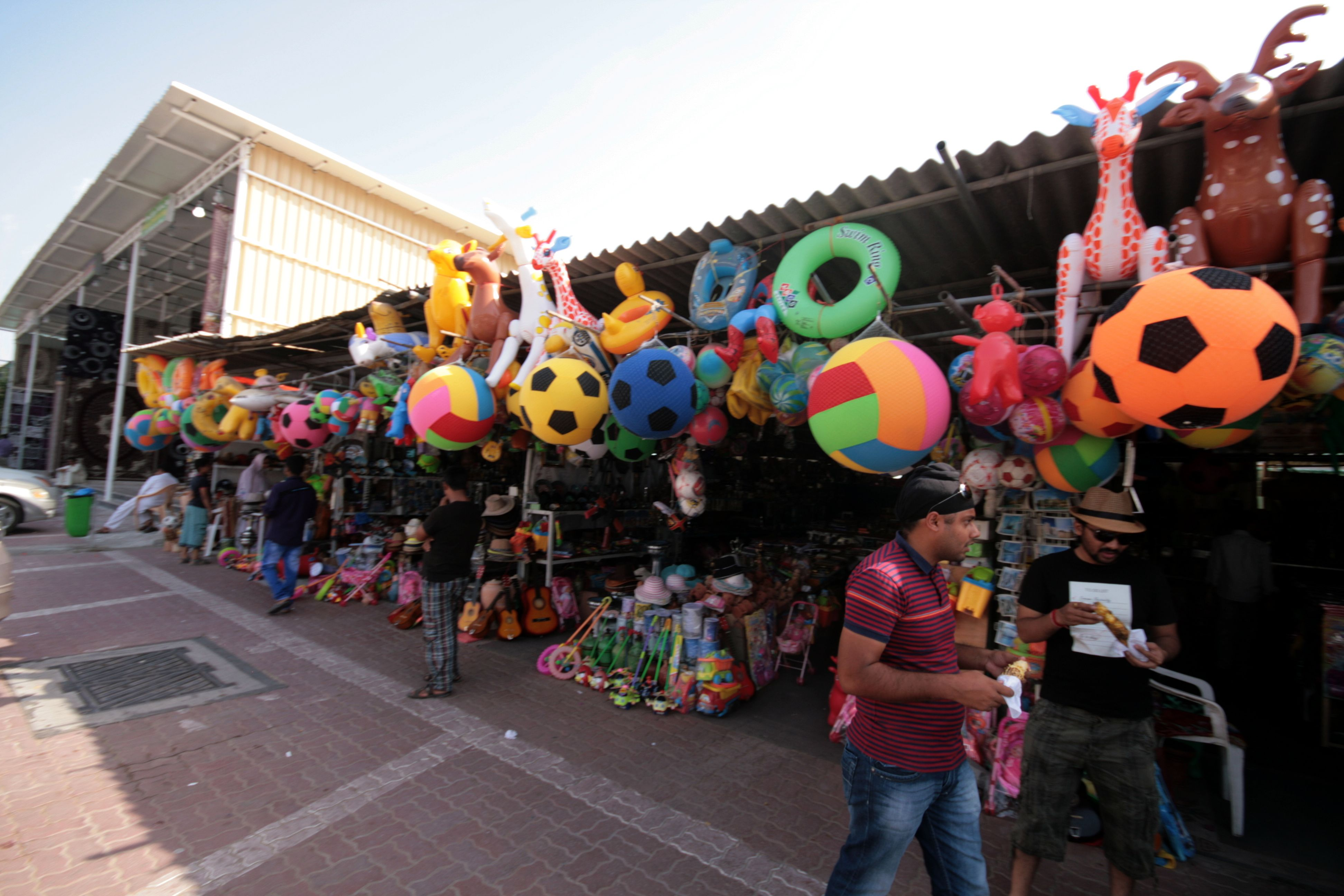
The Masafi 'Friday Market' – actually open all week

Located some 5 km West of Masafi (on the Dhaid Road), the Masafi Friday Market (Souk Al Juma'a) is actually open week-round and has become a popular tourist destination, consisting of a number of permanent and semi-permanent stalls selling toys, souvenirs, plants, carpets and rugs, pots and fruit and vegetables. The market grew around a number of farmers and other vendors using the presence of speed bumps on the road slowing traffic to sell vegetables and accessories from the backs of their trucks and expanded over time to form the present township.

Much of one side of the market (on the Masafi/Dhaid carriageway) was destroyed by fire on 30 May 2015.

== Sports ==
- Masafi Club
