= Muweilah =

UAE archaeological site

Coordinates: 25°17′55.76″N 55°29′50.62″E

Muweilah (Arabic: مويلح) is an archaeological site in Sharjah, United Arab Emirates. it is located in what is now the suburb of Al Jurainah near Sharjah University City.

A large, fortified settlement thought to have been occupied during the Iron Age II period (1,100-600BC), the site has been explored by archaeologists since the discovery of pottery shards by a local resident led to a French survey of the area in 1989 and archaeological work by an Australian expedition in 1994 It has yielded the oldest known example of writing found to date in the UAE, a pottery shard with an inscription, thought to be Sabean, with the letters 'bml'.

Muweilah is considered to be one of the most significant Iron Age sites in the UAE. Excavations have shown the buildings within the site were damaged by a widespread fire. The first evidence of writing in the UAE was found in this site, on a piece of pottery with the three letters of the South Arabic (B, M, L). Muweilah is one of the sites on the UAE's preliminary list to be nominated in the future to the World Heritage List.

== Foundation ==
Carbon dated artefacts found at Muweilah put the settlement's original date of establishment at between 850 and 800 BC and archaeological analysis has shown it enjoyed a brief heyday before being destroyed in a fire around 600BC. Constructed in the main from interlocked mud bricks and mud/stone brick walls, the walled settlement itself surrounds a large walled enclosure with seven buildings, thought to have provided living quarters as well as an administrative centre. This central building contained at least twenty columns and has been a rich trove for archaeologists, with extensive finds of painted and spouted vessels, iron weapons and hundreds of bronze pieces.

== Trade ==
Enabled by the domestication of the camel in the region, thought to have taken place around 1,000 BC, Muweilah's trade included the manufacture of copper goods, with extensive slag from the manufacture of copper items found throughout the site. A terracotta camel found during early digs stands as the most complete find of its kind and facsimiles of the piece currently decorate the gateway to the Sharjah Archaeological Museum. Other finds from the site include items imported from Iran, Iraq and Yemen and indicate extensive trading links. Muweilah is relatively unique in its early and extensive adoption of iron goods, thought to have been imported from Iran. Hundreds of grinding stones indicate the consumption of both barley and wheat. Although now some 15 km inland today, it is thought that in its heyday, Muweilah would have been located on a khor or creek.

Bio-archaeological analysis of remains has uncovered important information on subsistence strategies at Muweilah, largely linked to the role played by the domestication of the camel, with marine resources supplementing subsistence based on animal husbandry. The settlement at Muweilah is thought to have flourished through trade with inland settlements such as Masafi that made use of falaj irrigation to build agricultural resources.

There are also clear signs of a snake cult found at Muweilah, as in many other Iron Age sites across the Emirates.

== See also ==
- List of Ancient Settlements in the UAE
- Archaeology of the United Arab Emirates
- Iron Age in the United Arab Emirates
