= List of cultural property of national significance in the United Arab Emirates =

== Abu Dhabi ==
=== Central Region ===
ID	Name	Type	Location	District	Coordinates	Image
AD-1	Al Maqta Fort		Abu Dhabi		24°25′16″N 54°29′19″E	Al Maqta Fort Upload Photo
AD-2	Al Maqta Tower		Abu Dhabi		24°25′12″N 54°29′05″E	Al Maqta Tower Upload Photo
AD-4	Qasr al-Hosn		Sheikh Rashid bin Saeed Al Maktoum Street, Al Hosn, Abu Dhabi		24°28′56″N 54°21′17″E	Qasr al-Hosn Upload Photo

=== Eastern Region ===
ID	Name	Type	Location	District	Coordinates	Image
AA-1	Jebel Hafeet Tombs		Al Ain		24°02′42″N 55°47′59″E	Jebel Hafeet Tombs Upload Photo
AA-2	Al Hili Fort		Al Ain		24°17′09″N 55°46′29″E	Al Hili Fort Upload Photo
AA-3	Hili Tower		Al Ain		24°16′56″N 55°46′00″E	Hili Tower Upload Photo
AA-4	Al Hili Towers		Al Ain		24°17′14″N 55°46′23″E	Al Hili Towers Upload Photo
AA-5	Al Hosn Fort, also known as Sultan Fort or Eastern Fort		1st Street, Al Ain		24°12′59″N 55°46′27″E	Al Hosn Fort, also known as Sultan Fort or Eastern Fort Upload Photo
AA-6	Al A'ankah Fort (also spelled as Alanka)		Remah village, situated near the road between Abu Dhabi and Al Ain.		24°08′08″N 55°18′35″E	Al A'ankah Fort (also spelled as Alanka) Upload Photo
AA-7	Al Ain Palace Museum		Al Ain		24°12′54″N 55°45′39″E	Al Ain Palace Museum Upload Photo
AA-8	Bin Hamooda Fort		Al Qattara, Al Ain		24°15′21″N 55°44′53″E	Bin Hamooda Fort Upload Photo
AA-9	Bin Helal Fort		Al Ain		24°15′07″N 55°44′58″E	Bin Helal Fort Upload Photo
AA-10	Bin Helal Tower		Al Qattara, Al Ain		24°15′00″N 55°45′03″E	Bin Helal Tower Upload Photo
AA-11	Al Daramikah Tower (also known as Daramka or Aldramkh)		West of 120th Street / Mohammed bin Khalifa Street, Al Ain		24°15′28″N 55°45′09″E	Al Daramikah Tower (also known as Daramka or Aldramkh) Upload Photo
AA-12	Al Darmaki Fort, also known as Sheikh Sultan bin Mohammed Al Darmaki Fort				24°15′49″N 55°45′13″E	Al Darmaki Fort, also known as Sheikh Sultan bin Mohammed Al Darmaki Fort Upload Photo
AA-13	Al Darmaki House, also known as Abdullah bin Salem Al Darmaki House,		West of 120th Street / Mohammed bin Khalifa Street, Al Ain		24°15′41″N 55°45′12″E	Al Darmaki House, also known as Abdullah bin Salem Al Darmaki House, Upload Photo
AA-14	Al-Jahili Fort		Al Ain		24°12′58″N 55°45′02″E	Al-Jahili Fort Upload Photo
AA-15	Jahili Mosque		Al-Jahili Fort, Al Ain		24°12′55″N 55°45′09″E	Upload Photo Upload Photo
AA-16	Al Jimi Fort		East of 124th Street / Al Baladiyya Street, Al Ain		24°15′10″N 55°44′31″E	Al Jimi Fort Upload Photo
AA-17	Mezyad Fort		Mezyad		24°01′17″N 55°50′00″E	Mezyad Fort Upload Photo
AA-18	Al-Murabba Fort		Al Ain		24°13′15″N 55°46′30″E	Al-Murabba Fort Upload Photo
AA-19	Al Muwaiji Fort, locally known as Qasr Al-Muwaiji		Al Ain		24°13′31″N 55°43′37″E	Al Muwaiji Fort, locally known as Qasr Al-Muwaiji Upload Photo
AA-20	Al Qattara Fort		Al Qattara, Al Ain		24°15′36″N 55°44′58″E	Al Qattara Fort Upload Photo
AA-21	Al-Rumailah Fort		Rumailah, Al Ain		24°17′02″N 55°45′48″E	Al-Rumailah Fort Upload Photo
AA-22	Seja Fort, locally also known as Sijya Fort		Al Ain		24°01′14″N 55°37′57″E	Seja Fort, locally also known as Sijya Fort Upload Photo
AA-23	Al Wajidi Fort, sometimes also spelled as Wajdi		Al Qattara, Al Ain		24°15′48″N 55°44′55″E	Al Wajidi Fort, sometimes also spelled as Wajdi Upload Photo
AA-24	Hili Grand Tomb		Hili Archaeological Park, Al Ain		24°17′34″N 55°47′38″E	Hili Grand Tomb Upload Photo

=== Western Region ===
ID	Name	Type	Location	District	Coordinates	Image
LO-1	Attab Fort (also known as Al Meel Fort)		Liwa Oasis		23°08′29″N 53°53′48″E	Attab Fort (also known as Al Meel Fort) Upload Photo
LO-2	Dhafeer Fort, also known as Al Hamily Tower		Liwa		23°07′36″N 53°45′16″E	Dhafeer Fort, also known as Al Hamily Tower Upload Photo
LO-3	Al Hayla Tower		Liwa		23°06′36″N 53°36′55″E	Al Hayla Tower Upload Photo
LO-4	Al Jabbana Fort, its name sometimes also spelled Jabbanah		Liwa		23°03′45″N 54°04′17″E	Al Jabbana Fort, its name sometimes also spelled Jabbanah Upload Photo
LO-5	Maria Al Gharbiyah Fort, also called Maria Al Sharqiya Fort		Liwa		23°06′14″N 53°35′02″E	Maria Al Gharbiyah Fort, also called Maria Al Sharqiya Fort Upload Photo
LO-6	Mezairaa Fort (also spelled as Mezair'ah or Muzeira'a)		Liwa		23°08′20″N 53°46′50″E	Mezairaa Fort (also spelled as Mezair'ah or Muzeira'a) Upload Photo
LO-7	Muqib Tower		Liwa		23°06′39″N 53°41′25″E	Muqib Tower Upload Photo
LO-8	Qutuf Fort		Liwa		23°06′39″N 53°43′49″E	Qutuf Fort Upload Photo
LO-9	Umm Hosn Fort, sometimes also known as Umm Hisn or Arrada Fort		Liwa		23°00′27″N 53°25′26″E	Umm Hosn Fort, sometimes also known as Umm Hisn or Arrada Fort Upload Photo

== Ajman ==
ID	Name	Type	Location	District	Coordinates	Image
A-1	Ajman Fort (houses Ajman Museum)		Ajman		25°24′49″N 55°26′44″E	Ajman Fort (houses Ajman Museum) More images Upload Photo
A-2	Hassa Buweid Tower		Al Manama		25°19′35″N 55°58′25″E	Hassa Buweid Tower Upload Photo
A-3	Al Murabaa Tower		Ajman		25°24′15″N 55°25′46″E	Al Murabaa Tower Upload Photo
A-4	Red Fort		Al Manama		25°19′30″N 56°01′25″E	Red Fort Upload Photo
A-5	The White Fort, originally named Al Mareer Fort		Al Manama		25°19′29″N 56°00′47″E	The White Fort, originally named Al Mareer Fort Upload Photo

== Dubai ==
ID	Name	Type	Location	District	Coordinates	Image
D-1	Al Shindagha Watchtower		1 Al Ghubaiba Road, Dubai		25°15′55″N 55°17′25″E	Al Shindagha Watchtower Upload Photo
D-2	Al Fahidi Fort (also known as Dubai Fort)		Dubai		25°15′49″N 55°17′50″E	Al Fahidi Fort (also known as Dubai Fort) More images Upload Photo
D-3	A round watchtower (name unknown)				25°15′53″N 55°17′36″E	Upload Photo Upload Photo
D-4	Saeed Al Maktoum House				25°16′05″N 55°17′24″E	Saeed Al Maktoum House More images Upload Photo
D-5	Al Ahmadiya School		Al Ras, Dubai		25°16′06″N 55°17′42″E	Al Ahmadiya School Upload Photo
D-6	Heritage House		Al Ras, Dubai		25°16′06″N 55°17′42″E	Upload Photo Upload Photo
D-7	Bin Lootah Mosque		Al Ras, Dubai		25°16′06″N 55°17′43″E	Upload Photo Upload Photo
D-8	Matter Al Hahi House		Al Ras, Dubai			Upload Photo Upload Photo
D-9	Beiat Al Wakeel Restaurant		Souq Al Kabeer, Dubai		25°15′53″N 55°17′38″E	Upload Photo Upload Photo
D-10	Nahar Tower		Deira, Dubai		25°16′31″N 55°18′58″E	Upload Photo Upload Photo
D-11	AlSharia Mosque		Hatta			Upload Photo Upload Photo
D-12	Hatta Fort		Hatta			Hatta Fort More images Upload Photo
D-13	Hatta watchtower		Hatta		24°47′52″N 56°07′03″E	Upload Photo Upload Photo
D-14	Um Suqeim Majlis		Umm Suqeim 1, Dubai			Upload Photo Upload Photo
D-15	Al Baraha Tower		Al Baraha, Dubai			Upload Photo Upload Photo
D-16	Al Waeel Tower		Al Murar, Dubai			Upload Photo Upload Photo

ID	Name	Type	Location	District	Coordinates	Image
AS-1	Architectural Heritage and Antiquities Department Office (Building No 56)				25°15′57″N 55°17′24″E	Upload Photo Upload Photo
AS-2	Art Center (Building No 57)				25°15′56″N 55°17′25″E	Upload Photo Upload Photo
AS-3	Traditional Restaurant H (Building No 58)					Upload Photo Upload Photo
AS-4	Traditional Restaurant (Building No 59)					Upload Photo Upload Photo
AS-5	House of H.H Sheikh Juma Al Maktoum (Building No 61)					Upload Photo Upload Photo
AS-6	Yousef Al Dewis (Building No 63)					Upload Photo Upload Photo
AS-7	House Of H.H sheikh Hasher Almaktoum (Building No 65)					Upload Photo Upload Photo
AS-8	House of H.H Sheikh Hessa Bent Almarr (Building No 66)					Upload Photo Upload Photo
AS-9	House of H.H Sheikh Juma Al Maktoum (Building No 67)					Upload Photo Upload Photo
AS-10	House of zaind AbdulKareem Ebrihim (Building No 68)					Upload Photo Upload Photo
AS-11	House of Juma Bin Thani Al Daleel (Building No 70)					Upload Photo Upload Photo
AS-12	Name not known (Building No 71)					Upload Photo Upload Photo
AS-13	Name not known (Building No 72)					Upload Photo Upload Photo
AS-14	House of Halima Bent Abdullha (Building No 73)					Upload Photo Upload Photo
AS-15	House of Hamad Bin Thani (Building No 74)				25°15′58″N 55°17′24″E	Upload Photo Upload Photo
AS-16	Almarr Bin Hariz Mosque (Building No 76)					Upload Photo Upload Photo
AS-17	House of H.H sheikh Obid and juma Bin Thani (Building No 77)				25°16′07″N 55°17′26″E	Upload Photo Upload Photo
AS-18	House of H.H sheikh Saeed Al Maktoum (Building No 78)				25°16′05″N 55°17′24″E	Upload Photo Upload Photo
AS-19	Name not known (Building No 79)					Upload Photo Upload Photo
AS-20	House of Khalid Alyousef (Building No 81)					Upload Photo Upload Photo
AS-21	Name not known (Building No 82)					Upload Photo Upload Photo
AS-22	House of Ali Bin Hazeem (Building No 85)				25°16′02″N 55°17′24″E	Upload Photo Upload Photo
AS-23	House of Ahmed Bin Hazeem (Building No 86)					Upload Photo Upload Photo
AS-24	House of H.H Sheikh Juma Al Maktoum (Building No 87)					Upload Photo Upload Photo
AS-25	Traditional Restaurant I (Building No 88)					Upload Photo Upload Photo
AS-26	Traditional Restaurant F (Building No 89)					Upload Photo Upload Photo
AS-27	House of Rashed Obaid Bin Hassinah (Building No 92)					Upload Photo Upload Photo
AS-28	House of Rashed Bin Daar (Building No 93)					Upload Photo Upload Photo
AS-29	House of Abdullha Mohammed AlEstad (Building No 94)					Upload Photo Upload Photo
AS-30	House of Saeed Ahmed Khalaf Alotiabh (Building No 96)					Upload Photo Upload Photo
AS-31	House of H.Hsheikh Juma AlMaktoum (Building No 97)					Upload Photo Upload Photo
AS-32	House of Butti Bin Masood Bin Salem (Building No 100)		Al Shindagha			Upload Photo Upload Photo
AS-33	House of Saeed Bin Thani Al Daleel (Building No 101)		Al Shindagha			Upload Photo Upload Photo
AS-34	Name not known (Building No 102)		Al Shindagha			Upload Photo Upload Photo
AS-35	House of Khamis Bin Fairoz (Building No 104)		Al Shindagha			Upload Photo Upload Photo
AS-36	House of Hussin Abdullha Alzarouni (Building No 106)		Al Shindagha			Upload Photo Upload Photo
AS-37	House of Abdulraheem Ebrihim (Building No 108)		Al Shindagha			Upload Photo Upload Photo
AS-38	House of Saeed Ahmed Khalaf Alotiabh (Building No 111)		Al Shindagha			Upload Photo Upload Photo
AS-39	Al Khali Museum (Building No 112)		Al Shindagha			Upload Photo Upload Photo
AS-40	Former AlHijn Museum (Building No 113)		Al Shindagha			Upload Photo Upload Photo
AS-41	Al Dayifah House-A (Building No 115)		Al Shindagha		25°16′04″N 55°17′25″E	Upload Photo Upload Photo
AS-42	Al Dayifah House-B (Building No 116)		Al Shindagha			Upload Photo Upload Photo
AS-43	Exhibition (Building No 118)		Al Shindagha			Upload Photo Upload Photo
AS-44	House of Shiekha bent Saeed Almaktoom (Building No 119)		Al Shindagha		25°16′02″N 55°17′25″E	Upload Photo Upload Photo
AS-45	House Bin Qreban (Building No 120)		Al Shindagha			Upload Photo Upload Photo
AS-46	Bin Harab Mosque (Building No 122)		Al Shindagha		25°16′16″N 55°17′36″E	Upload Photo Upload Photo
AS-47	Alshawikh Mosque (Building No 123)		Al Shindagha			Upload Photo Upload Photo
AS-48	House of Mohammed Saeed Bin Galetah (Building No 124)		Al Shindagha			Upload Photo Upload Photo
AS-49	Traditional Restaurant D (Building No 125)		Al Shindagha		25°16′00″N 55°17′24″E	Upload Photo Upload Photo
AS-50	House of Ahmed Bin Zayed & Ali Bin Hazeem (Building No 126)		Al Shindagha			Upload Photo Upload Photo
AS-51	H.H Sheikh Saeed Bin Rashed Almaktoum (Building No 127)		Al Shindagha			Upload Photo Upload Photo
AS-52	Exhibition (Building No 128)				25°16′01″N 55°17′24″E	Upload Photo Upload Photo
AS-53	Almalla Mosque (Building No 131)					Upload Photo Upload Photo
AS-54	Bin Zayed Mosque (Building No 132)				25°16′01″N 55°17′24″E	Upload Photo Upload Photo
AS-55	House of Bin Kalban (Building No 133)					Upload Photo Upload Photo

ID	Name	Type	Location	District	Coordinates	Image
AF-1	Architecture Heritage Dept (Building No 3)		Al Fahidi			Upload Photo Upload Photo
AF-2	Architecture Heritage Dept (Building No 4)		Al Fahidi			Upload Photo Upload Photo
AF-3	Philatey House (Stamp Museum) (Building No 5)		Al Fahidi			Upload Photo Upload Photo
AF-4	Masjid Al Farouq (Mosque) (Building No 6)					Upload Photo Upload Photo
AF-5	Coins Museum (Building No 7)					Upload Photo Upload Photo
AF-6	Architecture Heritage Society Office (Building No 8)					Upload Photo Upload Photo
AF-7	Dubai Media Office (Building No 12)		Al Fahidi		25°15′51″N 55°17′58″E	Upload Photo Upload Photo
AF-8	Dar AlTurath Cultural Center (Building No 13)		Al Fahidi			Upload Photo Upload Photo
AF-9	X.V.A Hotel (Building No 14)		Al Fahidi		25°15′51″N 55°17′59″E	Upload Photo Upload Photo
AF-10	X.V.A Hotel (Building No 15)					Upload Photo Upload Photo
AF-11	Al Areesh Hotel (Building No 16)		Al Fahidi			Upload Photo Upload Photo
AF-12	Dar Ibn Al Haitham - Photography exhibition (Building No 17)		Al Fahidi			Upload Photo Upload Photo
AF-13	Restoration House Gallery (Building No 18)		Al Fahidi			Upload Photo Upload Photo
AF-14	Governmental Offices (Building No 19)		Al Fahidi			Upload Photo Upload Photo
AF-15	Traditional majlis (Building No 23)		Al Fahidi			Upload Photo Upload Photo
AF-16	Calligraphy House Gallery (Building No 24)		Al Fahidi			Upload Photo Upload Photo
AF-17	Residential House (Building No 25)		Al Fahidi			Upload Photo Upload Photo
AF-18	Sheikh Mohammed Cultural Center (Building No 26)		Al Fahidi			Upload Photo Upload Photo
AF-19	Name not known (Building No 27)		Al Fahidi			Upload Photo Upload Photo
AF-20	Social Club (Building No 28)		Al Fahidi			Upload Photo Upload Photo
AF-21	Special Needs Training and Skills Center (Building No 29)		Al Fahidi			Upload Photo Upload Photo
AF-22	Services (Building No 30)		Al Fahidi			Upload Photo Upload Photo
AF-23	Traditional Souq (Building No 31)		Traditional Souq, Al Fahidi			Upload Photo Upload Photo
AF-24	Traditional Souq (Building No 32)		Al Fahidi			Upload Photo Upload Photo
AF-25	Traditional Souq (Building No 33)		Al Fahidi			Upload Photo Upload Photo
AF-26	X.V.A Hotel (Building No 34)		Al Fahidi			Upload Photo Upload Photo
AF-27	Emirati Local House Restaurant (Building No 51)		Al Fahidi			Upload Photo Upload Photo
AF-28	AlBeit Aloud Restaurant (Building No 54)		Al Fahidi			Upload Photo Upload Photo
AF-29	AlBeit Aloud Restaurant (Building No 55)		Al Fahidi			Upload Photo Upload Photo

== Fujairah ==
ID	Name	Type	Location	District	Coordinates	Image
F-1	Fujairah Fort	Castle			25°08′19″N 56°20′13″E	Fujairah Fort More images Upload Photo
F-2	Habhab Fort (Habhab sometimes also spelled as Habsab)		Habhab		25°36′32″N 56°00′28″E	Habhab Fort (Habhab sometimes also spelled as Habsab) Upload Photo
F-3	Habhab Tower (East)		Habhab		25°36′33″N 56°00′32″E	Upload Photo Upload Photo
F-4	Habhab Tower (West)		Habhab		25°36′35″N 56°00′22″E	Upload Photo Upload Photo
F-5	Al Bithnah Fort		East of the E89 road, Al Bithnah		25°11′13″N 56°14′16″E	Al Bithnah Fort Upload Photo
F-6	Awhala Fort, also spelled as Ohala, Wahlah or Wahalah		Remah		24°08′08″N 55°18′35″E	Awhala Fort, also spelled as Ohala, Wahlah or Wahalah Upload Photo
F-7	Al Badiyah Towers		Al Badiyah		25°26′20″N 56°21′13″E	Al Badiyah Towers Upload Photo
F-8	Sakamkam Fort		Near Fujairah City		25°10′24″N 56°20′06″E	Sakamkam Fort Upload Photo
F-9	Al Hayl Fort				25°05′05″N 56°13′36″E	Al Hayl Fort Upload Photo
F-10	Al Badiyah Mosque		Al Badiyah		25°26′21″N 56°21′14″E	Al Badiyah Mosque More images Upload Photo

== Ra's al-Khaimah ==
ID	Name	Type	Location	District	Coordinates	Image
RAK-1	Al Hamra Tower 1		Al Hamra		25°41′48″N 55°48′17″E	Al Hamra Tower 1 Upload Photo
RAK-2	Al Hamra Tower 2		Al Hamra		25°41′10″N 55°47′27″E	Upload Photo Upload Photo
RAK-3	Dhayah Fort				25°53′04″N 56°03′38″E	Dhayah Fort Upload Photo
RAK-4	Dahan Tower		Dahan		25°46′44″N 55°55′42″E	Dahan Tower Upload Photo
RAK-5	Al Jazirah Al Hamra Fort				25°42′32″N 55°47′51″E	Al Jazirah Al Hamra Fort Upload Photo
RAK-6	Al Jeer Fort		West of the E11 road, Al Jeer		26°02′20″N 56°05′07″E	Al Jeer Fort Upload Photo
RAK-7	Khatt Fort		At Khatt Springs Road, Khatt		25°37′03″N 56°00′40″E	Khatt Fort Upload Photo
RAK-8	Khatt Towers		Khatt		25°37′01″N 56°00′47″E	Khatt Towers Upload Photo
RAK-9	Masafi Fort		Masafi		25°18′08″N 56°09′35″E	Masafi Fort Upload Photo
RAK-10	Al Rams Tower		Al Rams		25°52′46″N 56°01′31″E	Al Rams Tower Upload Photo
RAK-11	Ras Al Khaimah Fort (now RAK National Museum)		Next to Al Hisn Road, Ras Al Khaimah		25°47′40″N 55°56′42″E	Ras Al Khaimah Fort (now RAK National Museum) Upload Photo
RAK-12	Al Falayah Fort					Al Falayah Fort Upload Photo

== Sharjah ==
Heart of Sharjah

ID	Name	Type	Location	District	Coordinates	Image
S-1	Al Ghayl Fort, sometimes also spelled as Al Ghail or Gheel		Kalba		25°00′04″N 56°19′31″E	Al Ghayl Fort, sometimes also spelled as Al Ghail or Gheel Upload Photo
S-2	Al Hisn Fort		Dibba Al-Hisn		25°37′09″N 56°16′24″E	Al Hisn Fort Upload Photo
S-3	Al Khan Historical Tower		near the beach in the Al Khan area, Sharjah		25°20′07″N 55°21′34″E	Al Khan Historical Tower Upload Photo
S-4	Al Mahatta Fort		Central Sharjah			Al Mahatta Fort Upload Photo
S-5	Kalba Fort		Kalba		25°04′51″N 56°21′28″E	Kalba Fort Upload Photo
S-6	Sharjah Fort		At Hisn Avenue, Sharjah		25°21′31″N 55°23′11″E	Sharjah Fort Upload Photo

== Umm al-Quwain ==
ID	Name	Type	Location	District	Coordinates	Image
UQ-1	Falaj Al Mualla Fort				25°21′06″N 55°51′00″E	Falaj Al Mualla Fort Upload Photo
UQ-2	Falaj Al Mualla Tower (East)				25°20′37″N 55°50′53″E	Upload Photo Upload Photo
UQ-3	Falaj Al Mualla Tower (West)				25°20′42″N 55°50′33″E	Falaj Al Mualla Tower (West) Upload Photo
UQ-4	Umm Al Quwain Fort, sometimes also called Fort Al Ali				25°35′03″N 55°34′15″E	Umm Al Quwain Fort, sometimes also called Fort Al Ali Upload Photo

== See also ==
- List of Ancient Settlements in the UAE
