= Qasr Al Watan =

Presidential palace of the United Arab Emirates

Coordinates: 24°27′44″N 54°18′20″E

- قَصْر ٱلْوَطَن
- Facade and courtyard of Qasr Al Watan
- Interactive map of the Qasr Al Watan area

General information
- Location: Abu Dhabi, United Arab Emirates
- Height: 60 m (200 ft)

Website
- www.qasralwatan.ae

Qaṣr Al-Waṭan (Arabic: قَصْر ٱلْوَطَن, lit. 'Palace of the Nation') is the presidential palace of the United Arab Emirates, located in Abu Dhabi. The palace stands as a symbol of governance, functioning as a venue for political meetings, both diplomatic state receptions and Council of Ministers meetings, as well as a destination for visitors and tourists. It is not a residential space.

== History ==
Construction of the palace was completed in 2017.

Prior to 2019, the palace was used to serve for official purposes only until it was opened to the public as a tourism site by President of the United Arab Emirates Sheikh Khalifa bin Zayed Al Nahyan in 2019.

Prior to its opening, the palace was used only for official purposes, mainly hosting foreign leaders of states, and for meetings of the country's supreme council and federal cabinet. Even after being opened to the public, the palace continues to be used for these purposes.

The palace was opened to the public on 11 March 2019, in a ceremony hosted by Sheikh Mohammed bin Zayed and Mohammed bin Rashid Al Maktoum (Vice-President and Prime Minister of the UAE and Ruler of Dubai). In August, the palace was named by the travel and tourism website of Hotel and Rest among the top 20 landmarks of art and culture in the World. In 2020, the Qasr Al Watan Presidential Palace was nominated for the World Travel Awards as the main cultural tourist attraction in the Middle East.

== Interior and exterior ==
Interior of Qasr al Watan

The main majlis of Qasr al Watan

With a façade made of white granite and limestone, the mainly white palace is intricately designed and ornately decorated. It includes a dome with a diameter of 37 m (121 ft), a chandelier with 350,000 pieces of crystal, and a number of compartments. The dome is located on top of the central chamber known as "The Great Hall", which is surrounded by two wings to the east and west.

=== Eastern wing ===
The eastern wing has the "House of Knowledge", where a number of artefacts and other objects of importance are stored. Stored objects include gifts presented by visiting officials from other countries, and 2 religious texts in the "House of Knowledge": the Quran (including a replica of the Birmingham manuscript) and the Bible (including the Psalms of David). There is also a library with more than 50,000 books which document the cultural, social and political history of the country.

=== Western wing ===
The western wing has halls which are used for official purposes. Here, there is a room known as the "Spirit of Collaboration", where meetings of the UAE Cabinet and Federal Supreme Council would be hosted, besides summits of international bodies like the Organisation of the Islamic Conference, Arab League and Gulf Cooperation Council. Elsewhere, banquets for official events, besides diplomatic gifts from other countries, are kept.

Panorama of Qasr Al Watan

== See also ==
- List of cultural property of national significance in the United Arab Emirates
  - Qasr Al Muwaiji
  - Sheikh Zayed Grand Mosque
  - The Founder's Memorial
