= Sija Fort =

Historic fort in Al Ain, United Arab Emirates

Coordinates: 24°01′14″N 55°37′57″E

Sija Fort (Arabic: قلعة سيجا, also transliterated Sijaa) is a historic fort in the southern part of Al Ain, in the Emirate of Abu Dhabi, United Arab Emirates. Dating to the 19th century, it is associated with the Al Bu Shams tribe and is among the country's listed cultural properties of national importance.

== Architecture ==
The fort is built of sun-dried mudbrick coated with gypsum plaster, with date palm trunks used as beams to support the roofs. It has a square plan with a main entrance on the northern façade. Defensive walls protect the northern, southern and eastern sides, while three rooms along the western side form the western wall. A large central courtyard contains a clay staircase leading up to the roof, which is edged by a parapet about one metre high.

== History and conservation ==
The fort dates to the 19th century and belonged to the Al Bu Shams tribe, and is surrounded by agricultural land. It was restored in 2005 and undergoes periodic maintenance and conservation.

== See also ==
- Al Ain
- Al Jahili Fort
