= The Founder's Memorial =

Emirati monument to Zayed bin Sultan Al Nahyan in Abu Dhabi

- صرح زايد المؤسس (Arabic)
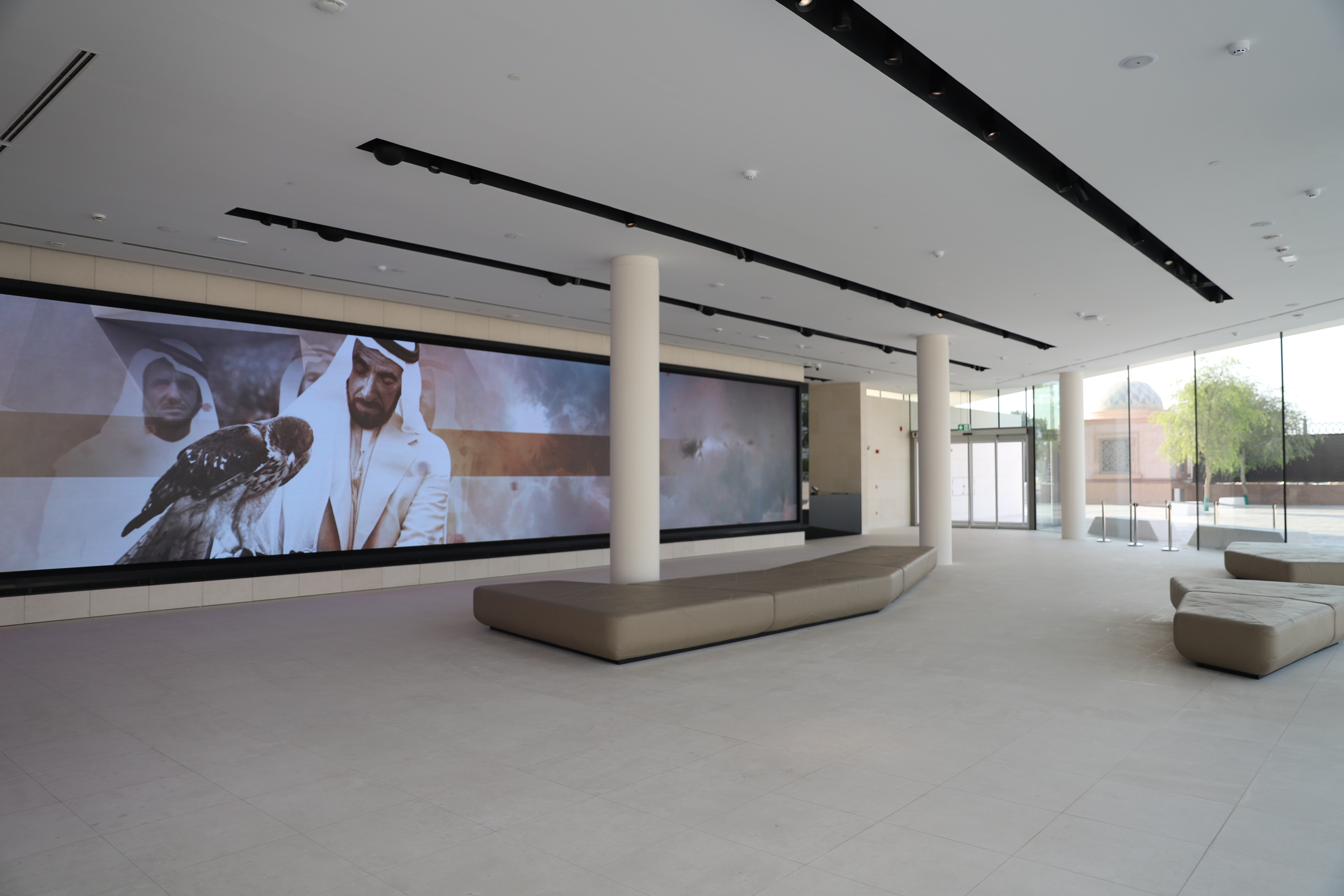
- Interactive map of The Founder's Memorial
- 24°27′47.23″N 54°19′20.69″E
- Location: Abu Dhabi, United Arab Emirates

Site notes
- Website: www.thefoundersmemorial.ae/en/

The Founder's Memorial (Arabic: صرح زايد المؤسس), a monument and visitor centre in Abu Dhabi, United Arab Emirates (UAE) is a memorial to Sheikh Zayed bin Sultan Al Nahyan, the first President of the United Arab Emirates, who died in 2004. Zayed was the driving force behind the formation of the United Arab Emirates, becoming the Union's first President (Arabic: رَئِـيـس, romanized: Ra'īs), a post which he held for a period of almost 33 years (from 2 December 1971 until his death in 2004).

Zayed was appointed the governor of the Eastern Region of Abu Dhabi in 1946, and was based in the Muwaiji Fort in Al Ain. He became Ruler of Abu Dhabi on 6 August 1966, following the announcement by the British government that it intended to abrogate its treaties with them and to withdraw from the area. In a seminal meeting on 18 February 1968 at a desert highland on the border between Dubai and Abu Dhabi, Sheikh Zayed and Sheikh Rashid bin Saeed Al Maktoum of Dubai shook hands on the principle of founding a Federation and attempting to invite other trucial rulers to join in order that a viable nation be formed in the wake of the British withdrawal.

Zayed's tireless determination to cement the foundation of the Federation that he saw as critical to the survival of the Trucial States as a viable political entity bore fruit when, on 2 December 1971, the UAE was founded. Zayed is often referred to as the Father of the Nation.

== Memorial ==
The memorial consists of an open Heritage Garden and Sanctuary Garden at the centre of which is a cubic pavilion housing The Constellation, an artwork dedicated to Zayed's memory. There is a visitor centre, which includes an interpretive film of Zayed and his life.

== Heritage Garden ==
The Heritage Garden is planted with Ghaf trees, the national tree of the United Arab Emirates, as well as sidr, acacias and date palms. A range of desert plants and shrubs planted in the Sanctuary Garden reflect Zayed's long connection with the desert, including desert cotton, henna, Caralluma, harmal and sewak, a plant long used by desert people as a toothbrush.

The Garden also features a water feature representing a falaj (water channel), through which water flows constantly.

== The Constellation ==
At the centre of the Sanctuary Garden is The Constellation, a collection of 1,327 geometric shapes suspended on 1,110 cables, which combine to form a three dimensional portrait of Zayed. Designed by artist Ralph Helmick, and fabricated and installed by UK based company Stage One Creative Services, The Constellation's suspended shapes consist of five different types of regular, convex polyhedrons known as 'platonic solids'. The Constellation is lit at night. The whole structure is surrounded by an elevated walkway.

== Visitor centre ==
The visitor centre is open daily from 9:00am to 10:00pm and includes an interpretive film of Zayed's life as well as multimedia presentations. Tour guides are available, offering free tours of the site and information about Zayed and his life.

== See also ==
- Qasr Al Watan
