= Ghayl, Sharjah =

Ghayl
- Location within United Arab Emirates
- Coordinates: 25°0′0″N 56°20′0″E
- Country: United Arab Emirates
- Emirate: Sharjah
- Elevation: 21 m (69 ft)

Ghayl is the name of a suburb of Kalba in Sharjah, United Arab Emirates (UAE), and home to Ghayl Fort and the Kalba Birds of Prey Centre.
