= Qasr Al Muwaiji =

Fort in Al Ain, United Arab Emirates

Al-Muwaiji Fort
- Qaṣr Al-Muwayjʿī (قَصْر ٱلْمُوَيْجْعِي)
- Al Ain, Eastern Region of the Emirate of Abu Dhabi, the U.A.E.
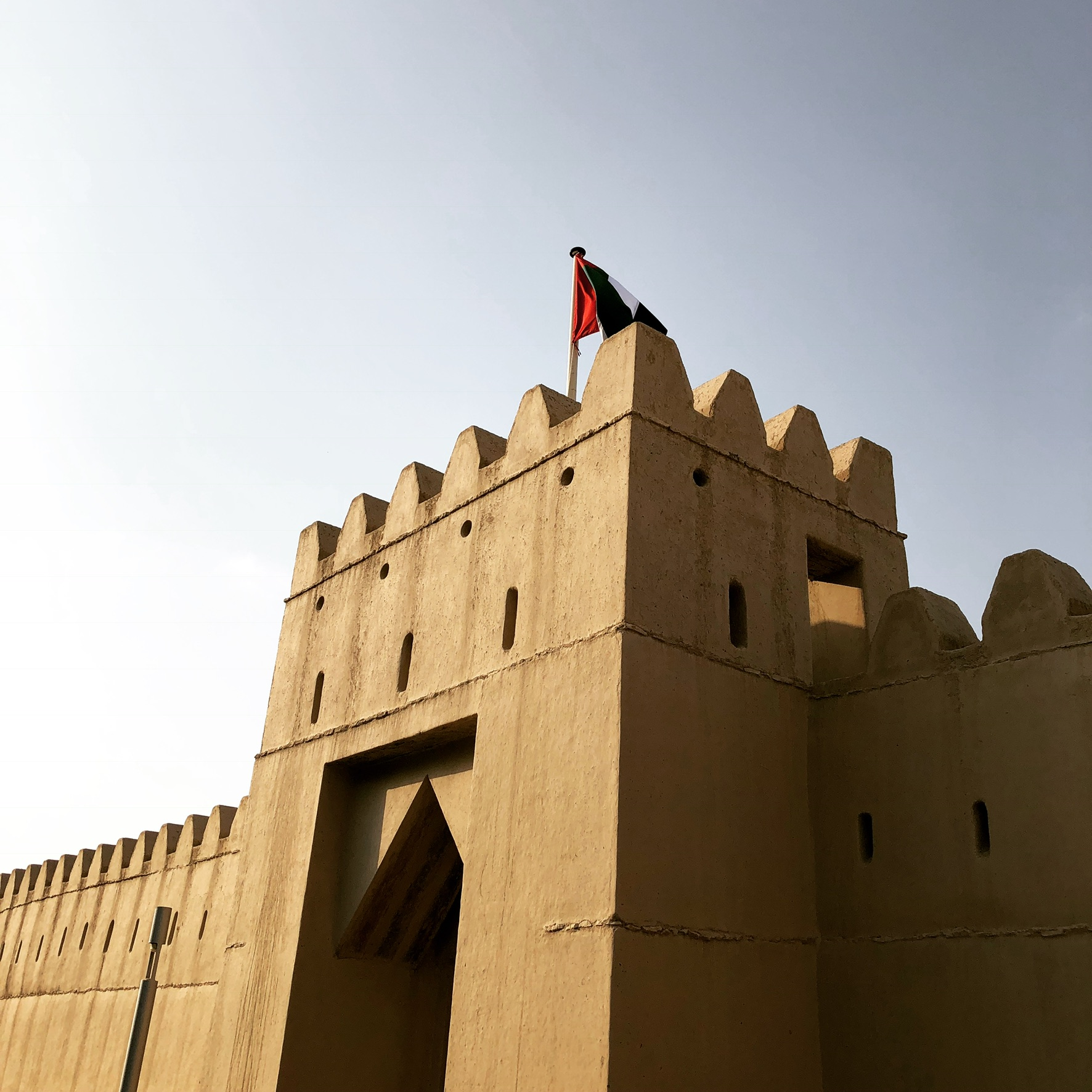

Site information
- Condition: Restored
- Website: qasralmuwaiji.ae/en/

Location
- Location in the UAE Al-Muwaiji Fort (Persian Gulf) Al-Muwaiji Fort (Middle East) Al-Muwaiji Fort (West and Central Asia)
- Coordinates: 24°13′30″N 55°43′37″E

Site history
- Built: Early 20th century, during the reign of Zayed bin Khalifa Al Nahyan
- Built by: Khalifa bin Zayed bin Khalifa Al Nahyan

Qasr Al Muwaiji (Arabic: قَصْر ٱلْمُوَيْجْعِي, romanized: Qaṣr Al-Muwayjʿī), or "Muwaiji Fort", is a fort in the central part of Al Ain in the Eastern Region of the Emirate of Abu Dhabi, the United Arab Emirates. It is noted as the birthplace of Sheikh Khalifa bin Zayed Al Nahyan, the former Ruler of Abu Dhabi and second president of the United Arab Emirates, and where Sheikh Zayed bin Sultan Al Nahyan was based during his tenure as the Ruler's Representative of the Eastern Region of the Emirate.

== History ==
It was reportedly built in the early 20th century by Sheikh Khalifa bin Zayed bin Khalifa Al Nahyan, during the reign of his father. The fort opened as a museum in 2015. The place, built on the western side of Al Ain, served as a place where officials met with the community to discuss issues and provide support.

== Architecture and exhibition ==
Qasr Al Muwaiji is built as a square enclosure with projecting corner towers and a prominent entrance, features that made the fort stand out in Al Ain. Following restoration work, the site became a museum and cultural exhibition presenting the history of the fort, its connection to the Al Nahyan family, and its role in the history of Al Ain. The exhibition also highlights the importance of water and nearby oases to life in the area.

== Gallery ==
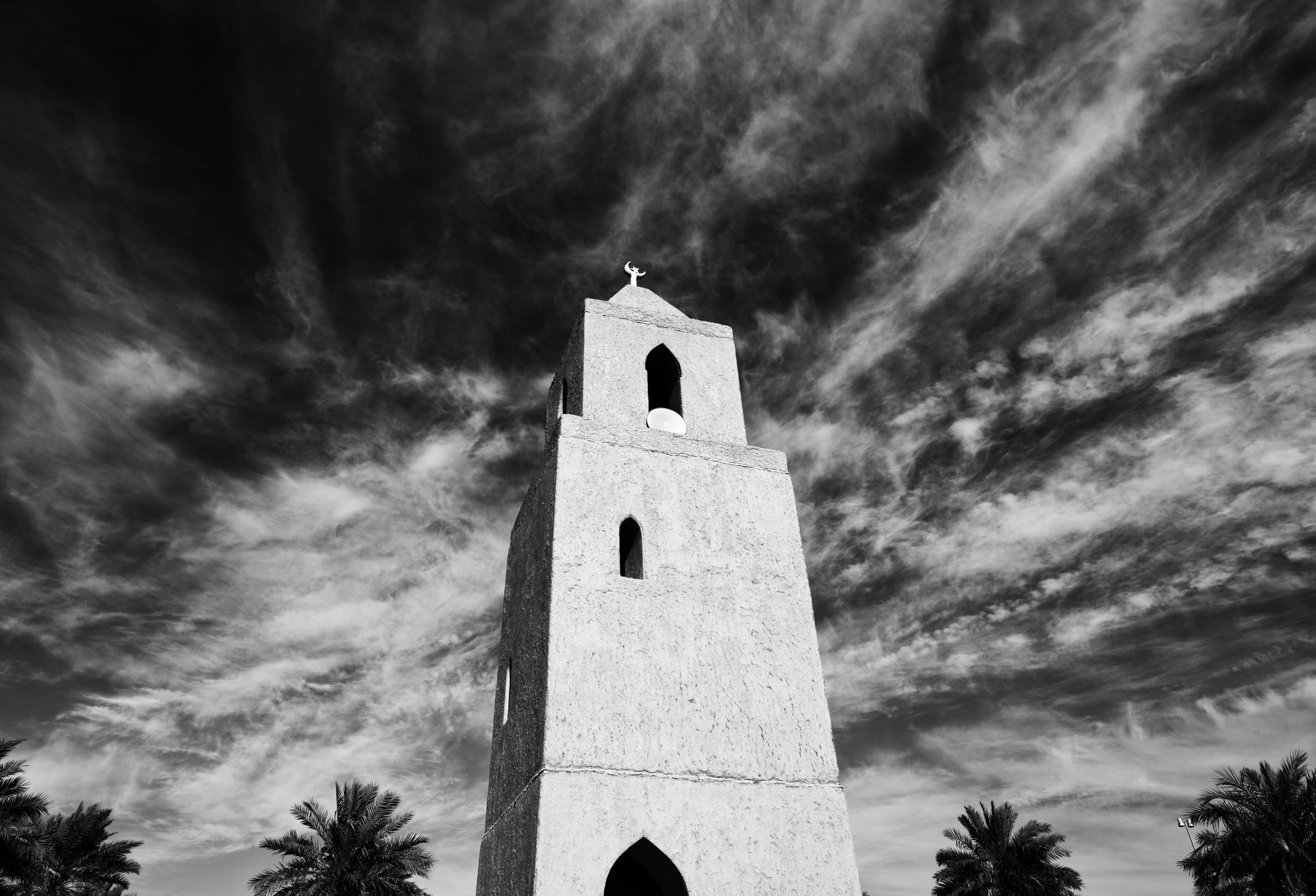
Qasr Al Muwaiji Fort

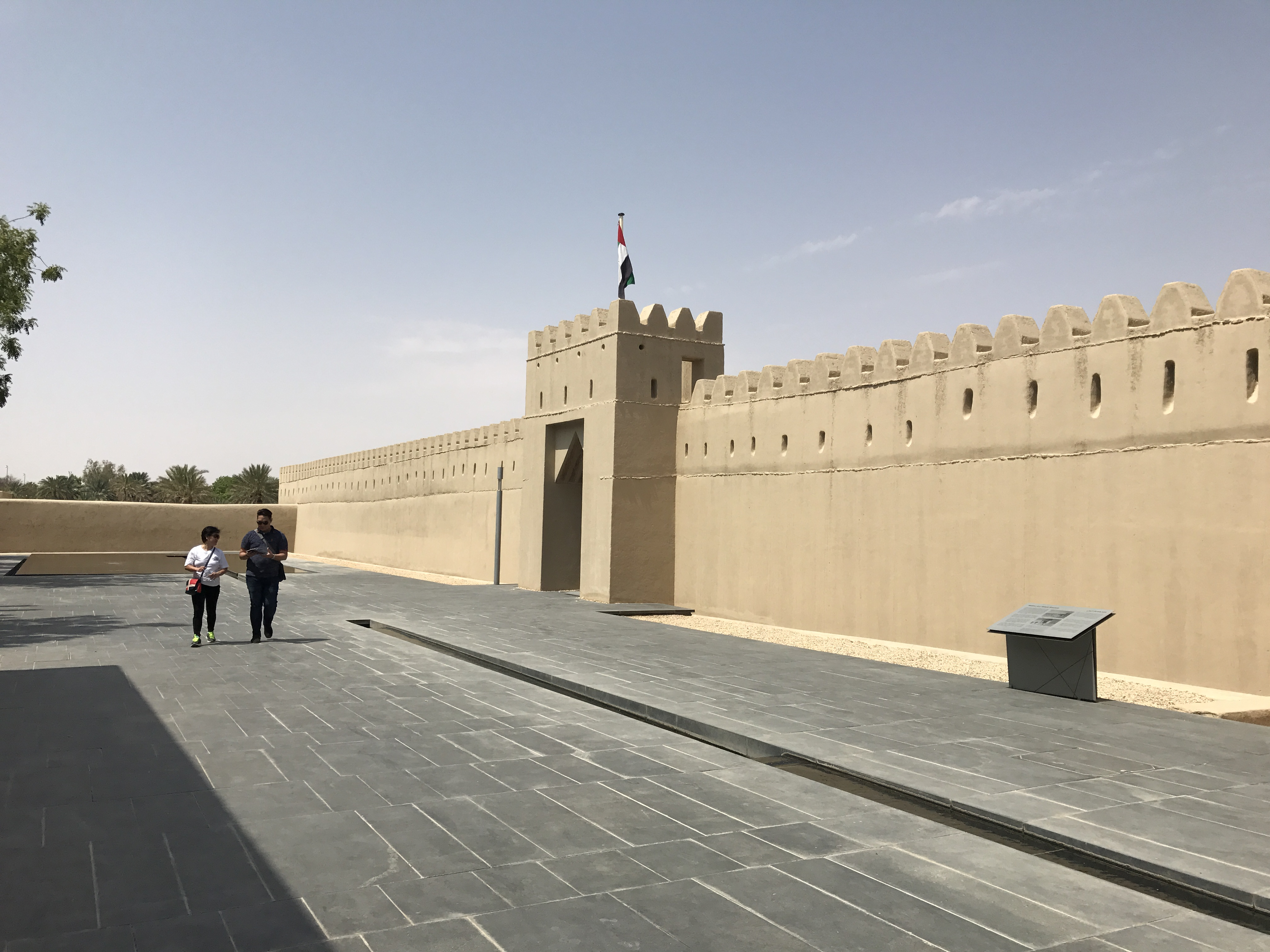
Exterior view of Al Muwaiji Fort

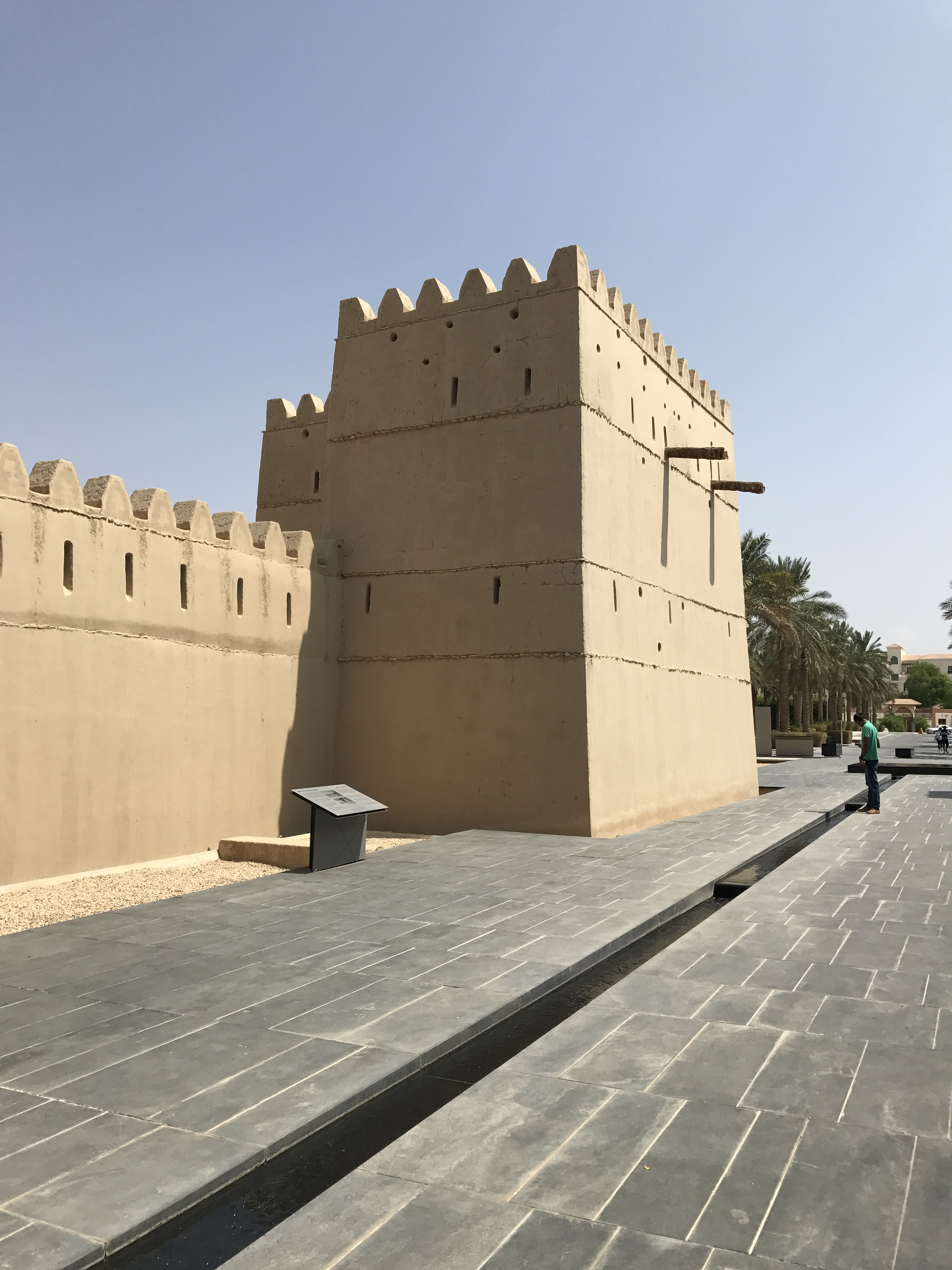
View of the fort walls

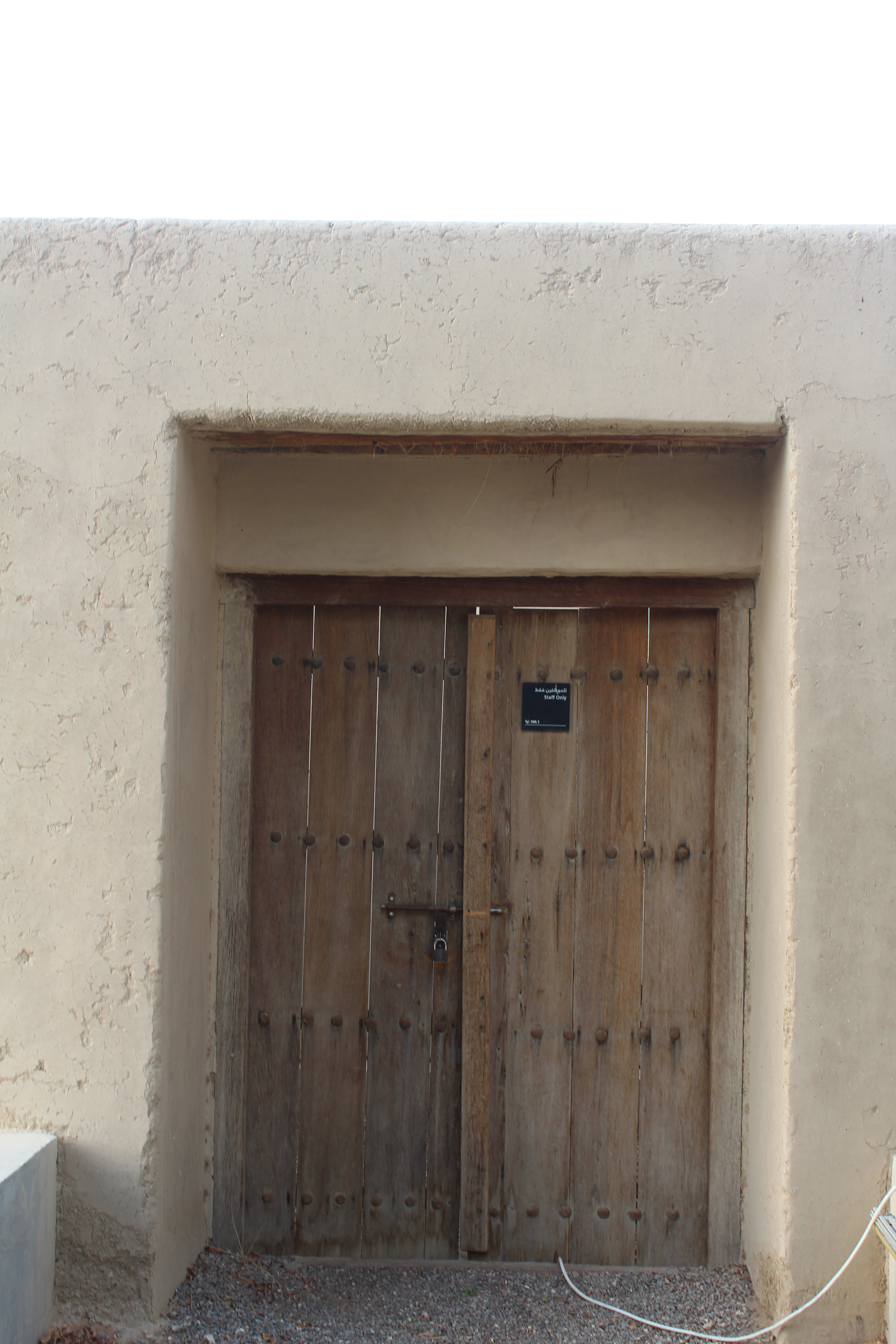
Fort gate

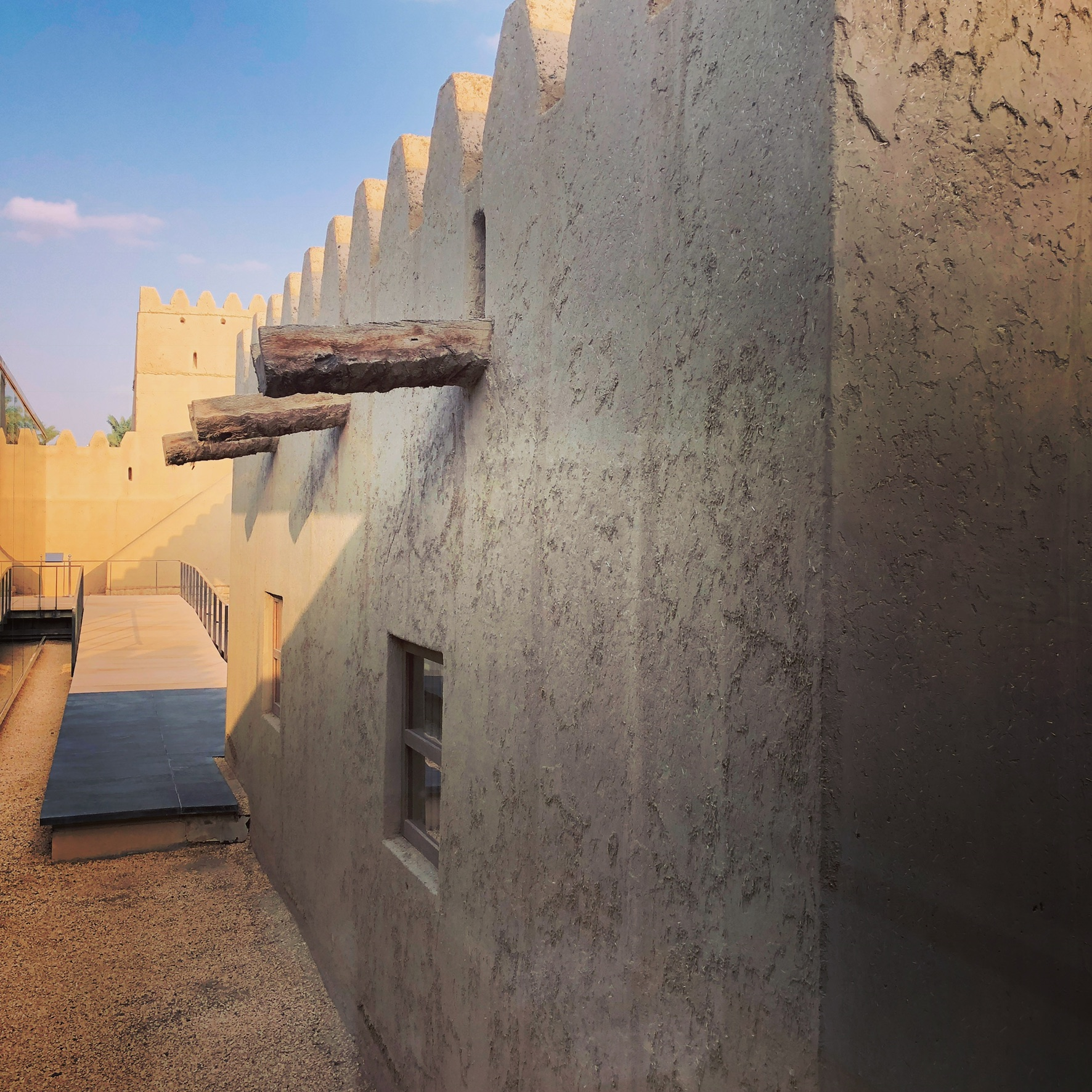
Interior of the fort

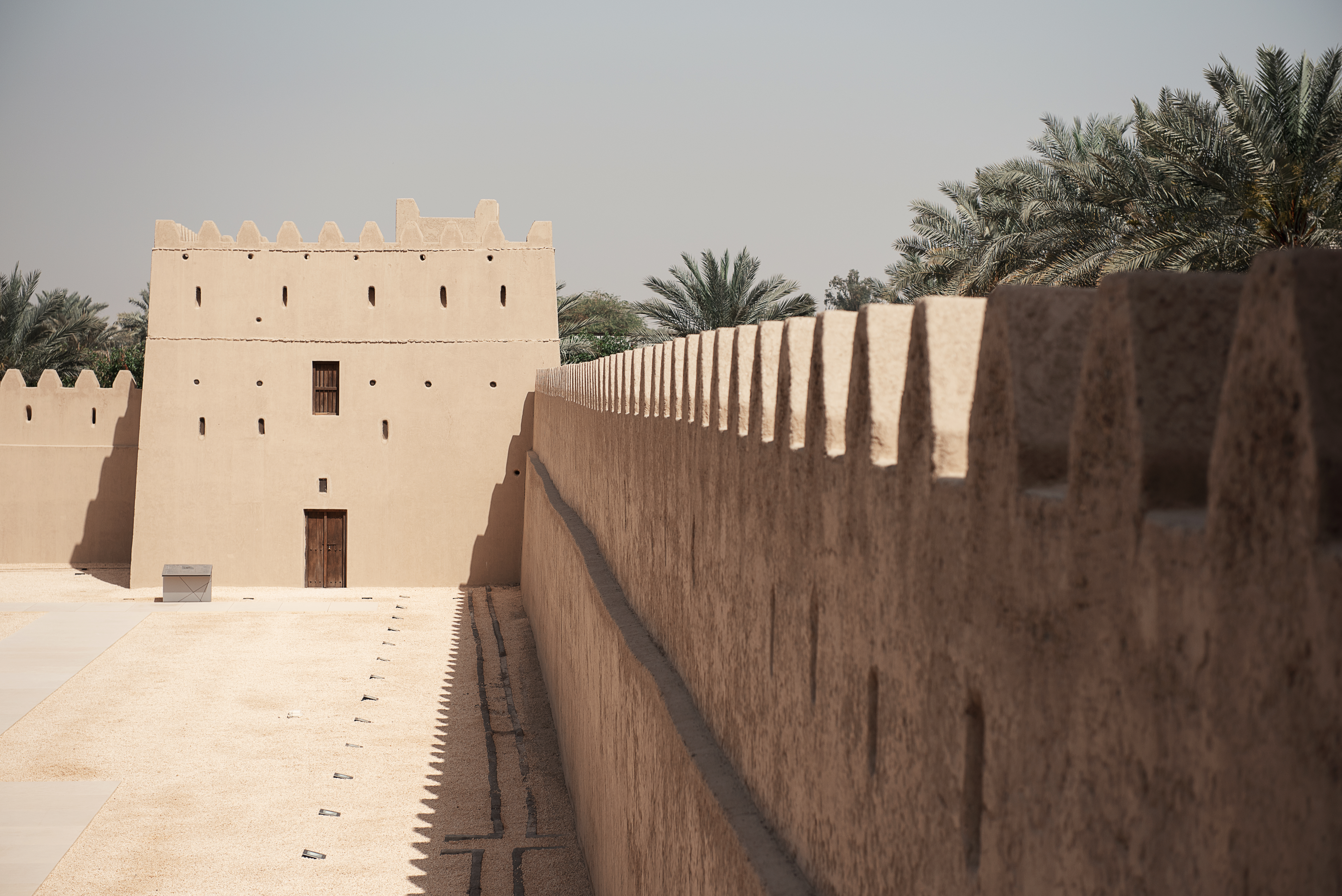
Al Muwaiji Fort

== See also ==
- 2018 Abu Dhabi Tour
- List of cultural property of national significance in the United Arab Emirates
  - Al Jahili Fort
  - Mezyad Fort
  - The Founder's Memorial
- Tawam (region)
