= Al Jahili Fort =

Fort in the UAE

Al-Jahili Fort
- قَلْعَة ٱلْجَاهِلِي
- Al Ain, the Eastern Region of the Emirate of Abu Dhabi, United Arab Emirates
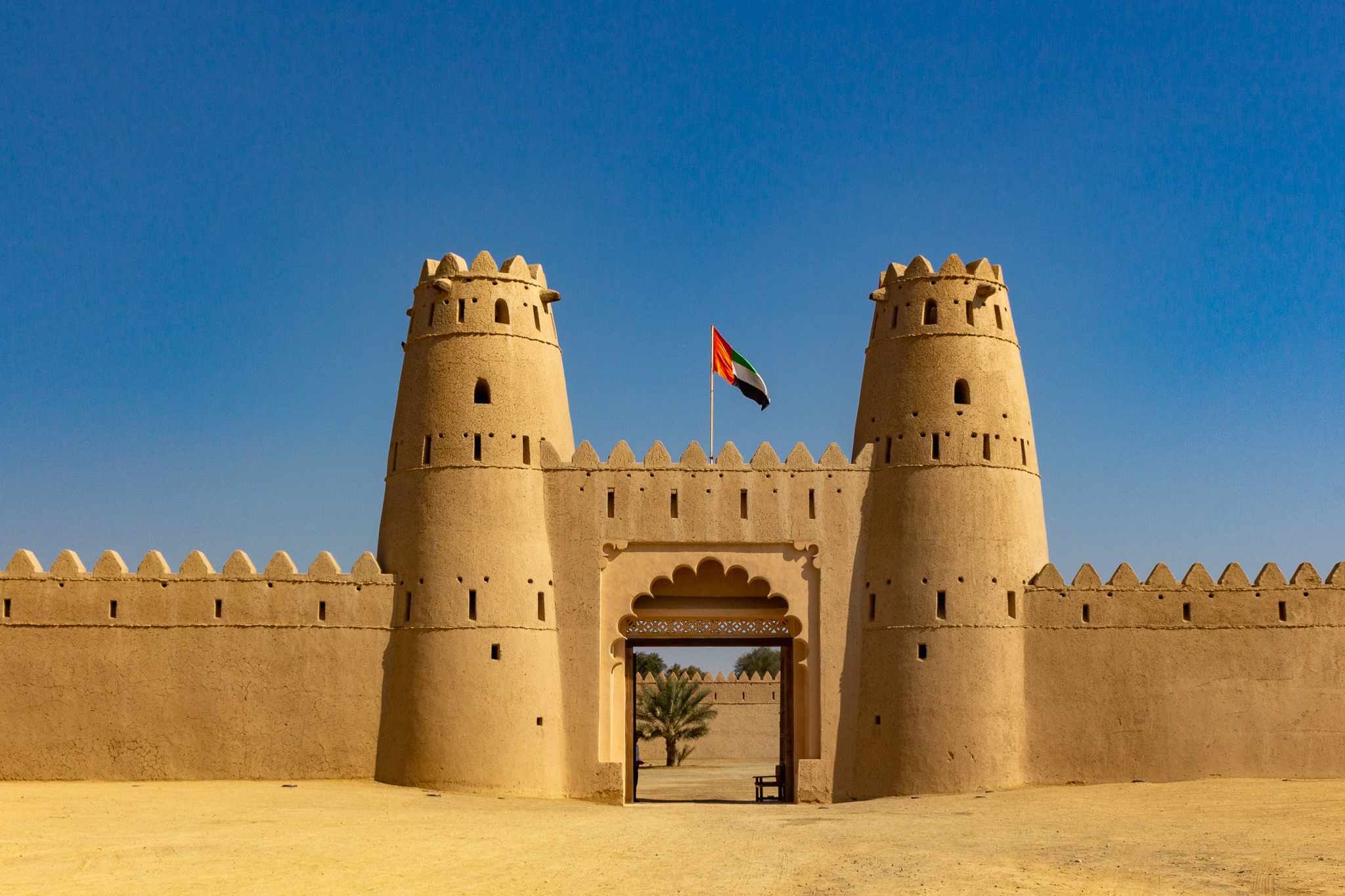
- Entrance of Al Jahili Fort

Site information
- Condition: Restored

Location
- Location in the UAE
- Location within United Arab Emirates Location within Persian Gulf Location within West and Central Asia
- Coordinates: 24°12′58″N 55°45′9″E

Site history
- Built: c. 1891

Al-Jahili Fort (Arabic: قَلْعَة ٱلْجَاهِلِي, romanized: Qalʿat al-Jāhilī) is a 19th century fort in Al Ain, United Arab Emirates (UAE). The fort was built in 1891 in Al-Jahili Oasis by Sheikh Zayed bin Khalifa Al Nahyan for the protection of date palm farmers. In 1955, it served as a base for the Trucial Oman Scouts. Since 1971, it is a tourist attraction in Al Ain.

== History ==
The fort was established in 1891 around Al-Jahili Oasis for the protection of palm farmers. In 1955, it was used as a base for Trucial Oman Levies, which were later renamed to Trucial Oman Scouts in 1956. The fort was used to distribute first aid, basic medicine and items such as disinfectants to remote villages around Al Ain through camel patrols. A military band was formed in 1957 at the fort.

Percy Cox, in his tour to Al Ain in 1905, reportedly visited the Al Jahili region. In 1906, J. G. Lorimer mentioned that the fort was constructed under the rule of Zayed bin Khalifa Al Nahyan.

The fort was restored by the Department of Antiquity and Museums in Al Ain during the mid-1980s. It was later restored again by the Abu Dhabi Authority for Culture & Heritage in 2007–2008, during which several elements of infrastructure were put in place, including a visitors' office, gift shops, cafe, and wider public square for exhibitions and cultural activities. The fort is planned to be rehabilitated in the future for a bigger role in the tourism industry and social activity in the region of Al Ain.

== Location ==
The fort is located on the southern part of the city of Al Ain close to Al Ain Castle Museum. It is on a strategic location where there are water sources and agricultural land.

== Architecture ==
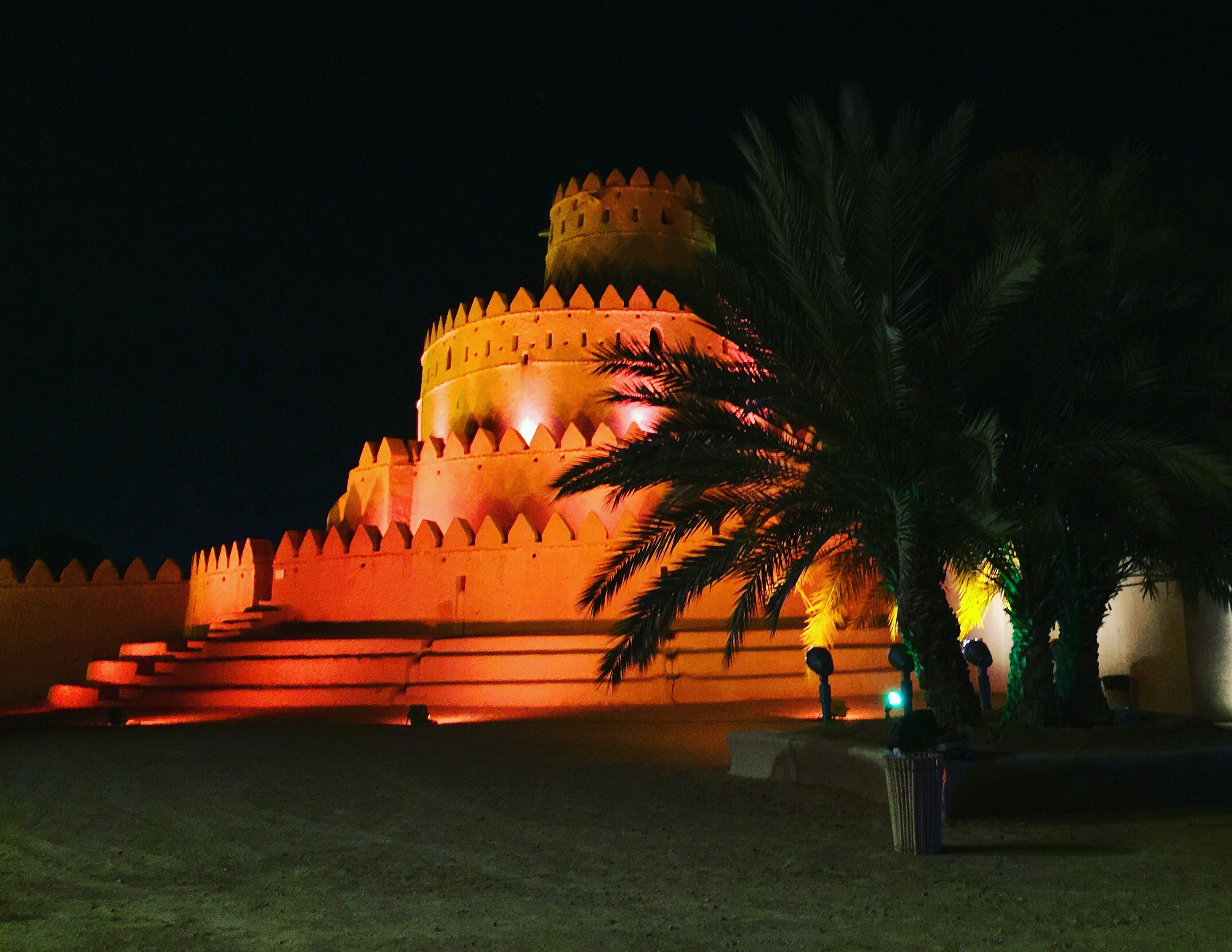
Al Jahili Fort by night

Similar in appearance to Mezyad Fort, Jahili Fort is one of the largest castles in the city. Construction on the fort began in 1891. It is a part of a bigger public complex which includes a public square. The fort is square-shaped and is 118 metres (387 feet) long and 8 metres (26 feet) high. There are embrasures and triangular balconies on the top. It has three round watchtowers and a rectangular watchtower on the northwestern corner. The round watchtowers have a diameter of 5 metres (16 feet) and a height of 14 metres (46 feet), while the rectangular watchtower has a width and length of 4 and 7 metres (13 and 23 feet), respectively, and height of 14 metres (46 feet). The rectangular tower is considered stronger in terms of defensive capacity. Outside the walls of the fort is a historic mosque.

== Replica ==
A smaller replica of some elements of the fort exists next to Sheikh Zayed bin Sultan Al Nahyan Bridge over the Swat River in the Swat Valley of Pakistan. The replica and the bridge were inaugurated in April 2013.

== See also ==
- Al-Muwaiji Fort
- List of cultural property of national significance in the United Arab Emirates
