= Al Murabba Police Museum =

Polic museum in Al Ain, UAE

- Established: 23 February 2019
- Location: Othman Bin Affan Street, Al Ain, Emirate of Abu Dhabi, United Arab Emirates
- Coordinates: 24.2207°N 55.7759°E
- Type: Police museum

Al Murabba Police Museum is a museum in Al Ain, Emirate of Abu Dhabi, United Arab Emirates, that explores the heritage of the police force in the UAE. There are a number of items in its gallery that showcase the equipment and effects of the different police forces that have existed throughout history, as well as a variety of information describing and explaining them.

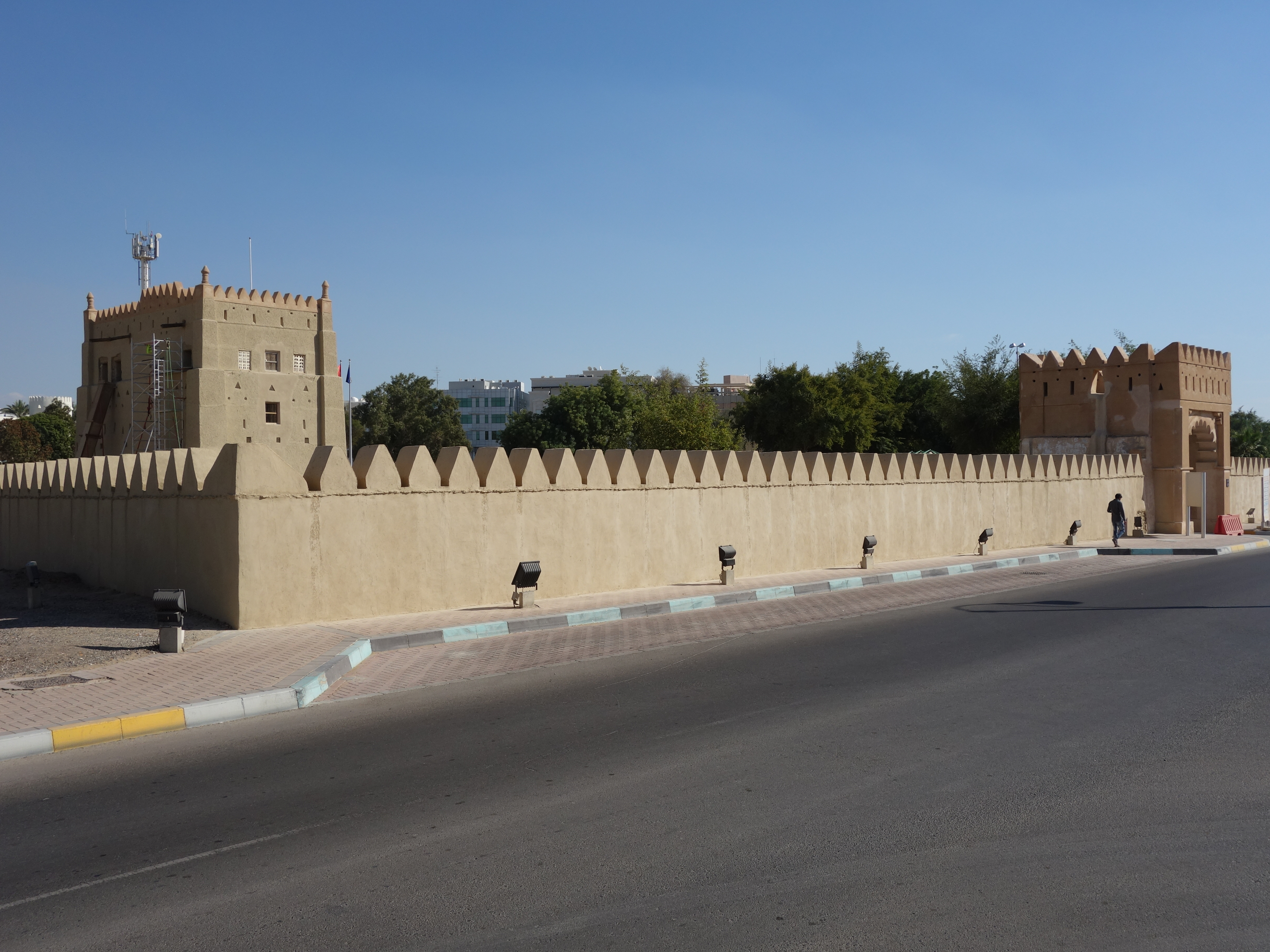
Al Murabba Fort, next to the museum

The museum is adjacent to the Al Murabba Fort in Al Ain. It is open daily from 8:00 am to 2:00 pm and is closed on Fridays, Saturdays, and public holidays.

== About the museum/background ==
Located in Al Ain, Abu Dhabi, Al Murabba Police Museum is a museum dedicated to the Abu Dhabi Police, inaugurated on 23 February 2019, as part of the year's Al Murabba Heritage Festival. The opening concurred with the 50th anniversary of the graduation of the first group of students, named "Zayed the First Squadron", from the Abu Dhabi Police School established in 1957 (now known as the Police College).

The museum was inaugurated by the Minister of State, Major Sheikh Zayed bin Hamad Al Nahyan and Minister Zaki Nusseibeh, at the Ministry of Foreign Affairs and International Co-operation. Some retired police officers who were part of the force over 50 years ago also attended the inauguration.

== Museum layout and gallery ==
Built by the father of the Nation, Sheikh Zayed, Al Murabba Police Museum is within what is now the former Al Murabba Police Station. The museum is divided into sections, showing the evolution of the police forces throughout history, including from Ancient Egypt to early Umayyad Caliphate and medieval France. The development of the Abu Dhabi Police is traced from its inception in the late 1950s by the late Sheikh Shakhbut bin Sultan.

The museum displays old photographs and police effects, such as badges, uniforms, and guns. Some items on display belonged to the late Sheikh Zayed. The legacy of the Abu Dhabi Police is expressed in the museum through documents, information, and historical stories.

== See also ==
- List of police museums
- Al Murabba in Saudi Arabia
