= Habhab =

- Location within United Arab Emirates
- Coordinates: 25°36′32″N 56°0′27″E
- Country: United Arab Emirates
- Emirate: Fujairah
- Elevation: 555 m (1,821 ft)

Habhab is a village in Fujairah, United Arab Emirates (UAE).

It is the site of the JSW Factory for Clinker Production, owned by Indian 'green' cement producer JSW Cement Group. The facility is planned to have the capability to produce an annual 6 million tonnes of limestone, of which 1.4 million tonnes are to be used for clinker production.

A recent initiative to establish majlis or meeting places in remote areas of Fujairah saw a 30-seat majlis with a 400-capacity ballroom for weddings and other community functions opened in 2017 at Habhab.

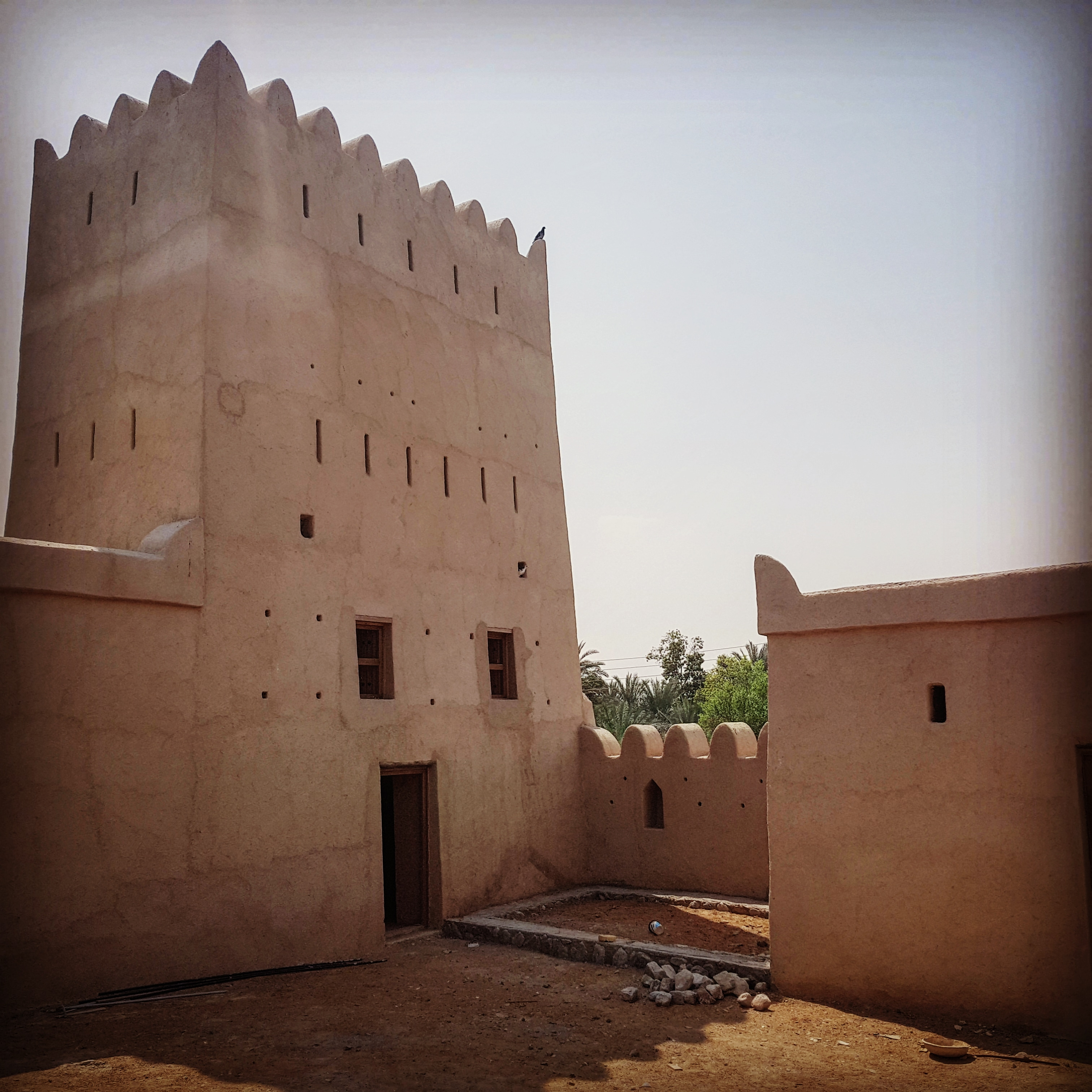
Habhab Fort

== History ==
Habhab was originally part of the territory controlled by Ras Al Khaimah, but moved to Fujairah following a takeover in the 1950s. The move saw a number of the Al Za'ab tribe relocating to Khatt, Nakhil and Fahlain.

Habhab is the location of both a fort (currently being restored as of September 2018) and a hilltop watchtower.
