= Awhala Fort =

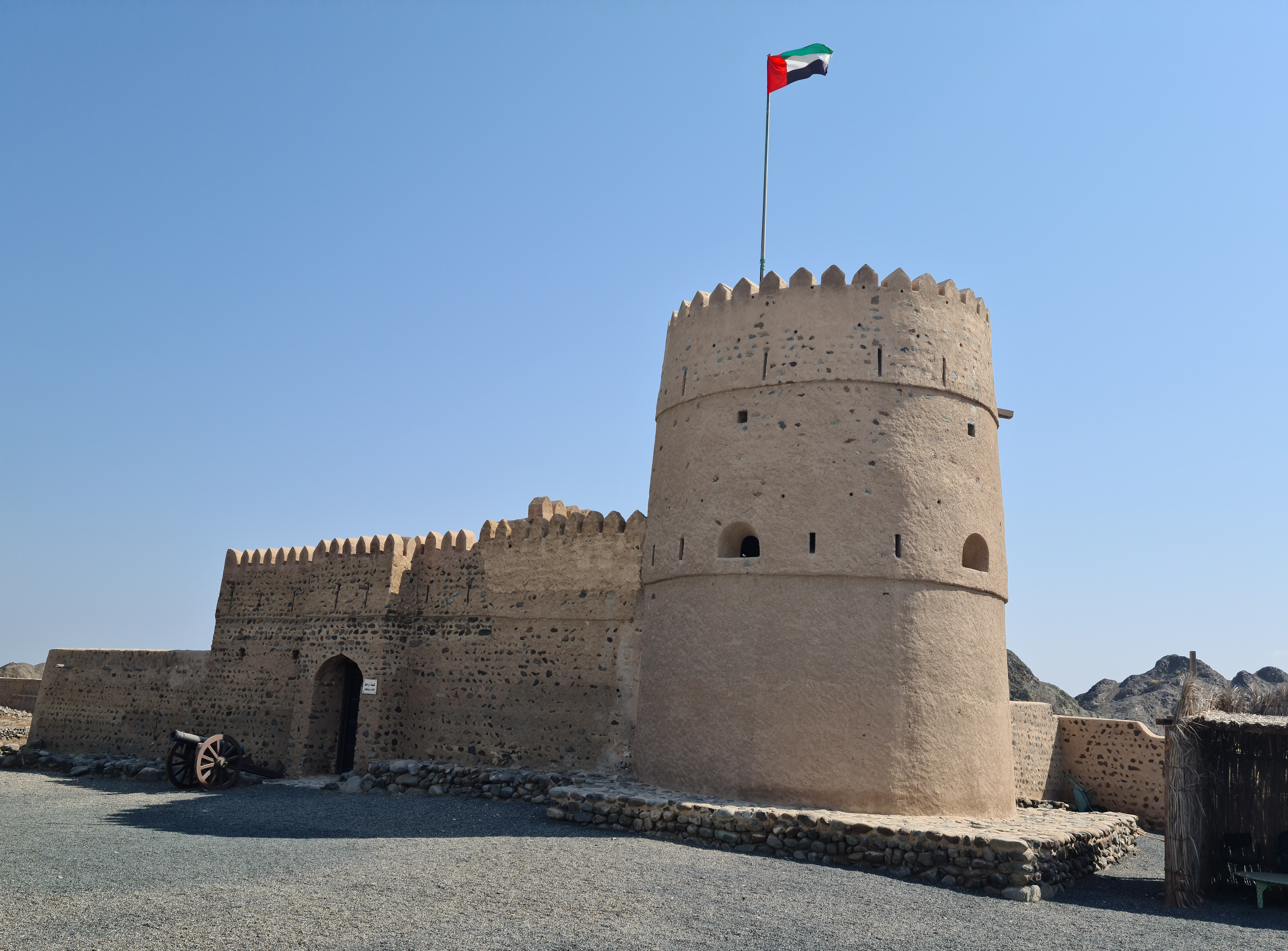

- Location within United Arab Emirates
- Coordinates: 24°54′28.3″N 56°18′13″E
- Country: United Arab Emirates
- Emirate: Fujairah
- Elevation: 216 m (709 ft)

Awhala Fort is a restored late Islamic Fort in the village of Awhala (also variously rendered Ohala, Wahala and Ouhala), in Fujairah, United Arab Emirates. The village is located in the lower reaches of the Wadi Helo. Significant finds of Iron Age development lie below the foundations of the fort and signs of Wadi Suq period occupation have also been found.

== Iron Age and earlier ==
Mudbrick and stone walls are apparent at Awhala, with destruction layers and ceramics pointing to occupation of the fort from Iron Age dates onwards. A massive earlier wall was incorporated into the late Islamic Fort structure. Sherds of Wadi Suq era pottery were found at the site, pointing to continuous or near-continuous occupation of Awhala from 1,500 to 1,300 BCE. Ceramic jars found at the site can be compared to those found at other Iron Age sites in the Emirates and a confident date can be ascribed to these of Iron Age II (1,000 to 600 BCE) provenance. The Iron Age fortifications at Awhala are considered to form one of the largest Iron Age structures in southeastern Arabia.

== Modern restoration ==
The late Islamic fort was restored in 2003 and is thought to be some 250 years old. It has a distinctive round tower standing above a high-walled small, rectangular courtyard. The tower itself is 11 metres high and 9 metres in diameter.
