= Mezyad, Al-Ain =

Mezyad مَزْيَد Mazyad
- Town
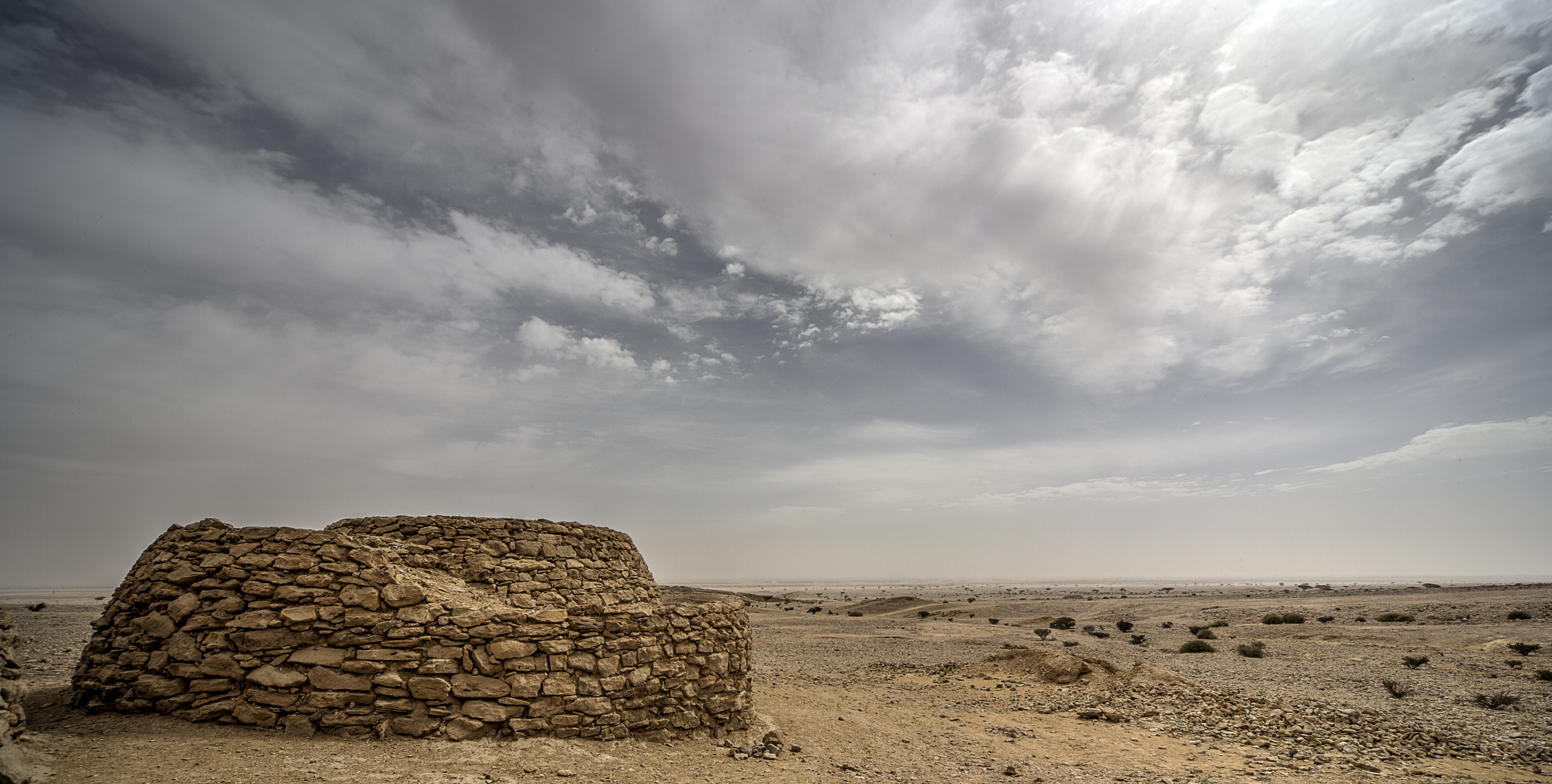
- Prehistoric 'beehive' tomb near Jebel Hafeet, from the Hafit period of the Early Bronze Age in Mezyad Desert Park, near the settlement of Mezyad

- Location of Mezyad in the U.A.E. Mezyad (Persian Gulf) Mezyad (Middle East) Mezyad (West and Central Asia)
- Coordinates: 24°1′16″N 55°50′0″E
- Country: United Arab Emirates
- Emirate: Abu Dhabi
- Municipal region: Al-Ain

Government
  - Type: Absolute monarchy
  - Sheikh: Mohammed bin Zayed Al Nahyan
  - Ruler's Representative of the Eastern Region of the Emirate of Abu Dhabi: Tahnoun bin Mohammed Al Nahyan

Area
  - Total: 15,100 km^{2} (5,800 sq mi)

Population (2017)
  - Total: 766,936
  - Density: 50.8/km^{2} (132/sq mi)
- Time zone: UTC+4 (UAE Standard Time)

Mezyad (Arabic: مَزْيَد, romanized: Mazyad) is a settlement in the Eastern Region of the Emirate of Abu Dhabi, to the south of the main part of Al Ain City, on the border of the U.A.E. and Oman. It is known for having a historical fort, and is part of a desert park, which also includes a necropolis and Mount Hafeet nearby. The park can be called either "Mezyad Desert Park" or "Jebel Hafeet Desert Park".

== History ==
As a region, Al-Ain has been inhabited for over 7 millennia, as demonstrated by archeological finds. In particular, there are tombs shaped as beehives in the area of Mezyad, at the base of Jebel Hafeet, which date back to the Hafit period of the Early Bronze Age, besides In the 1950s, Sheikh Zayed, who would become the founding President of the United Arab Emirates, discovered the tombs, and brought this to the attention of a Danish team, leading to an excavation at the tombs in 1959. In 1971, Al Ain Museum was built to house items from this area. In the 2000s, the Abu Dhabi Authority for Culture & Heritage lobbied for its recognition as a World Heritage Site by UNESCO, and in 2011, Al-Ain became the first World Heritage Site in the UAE to be recognized by UNESCO.

=== Mezyad Fort ===
Mezyad Fort
- Qalʿat Mazyad (قَلْعَة مَزْيَد)
- Al Ain Region
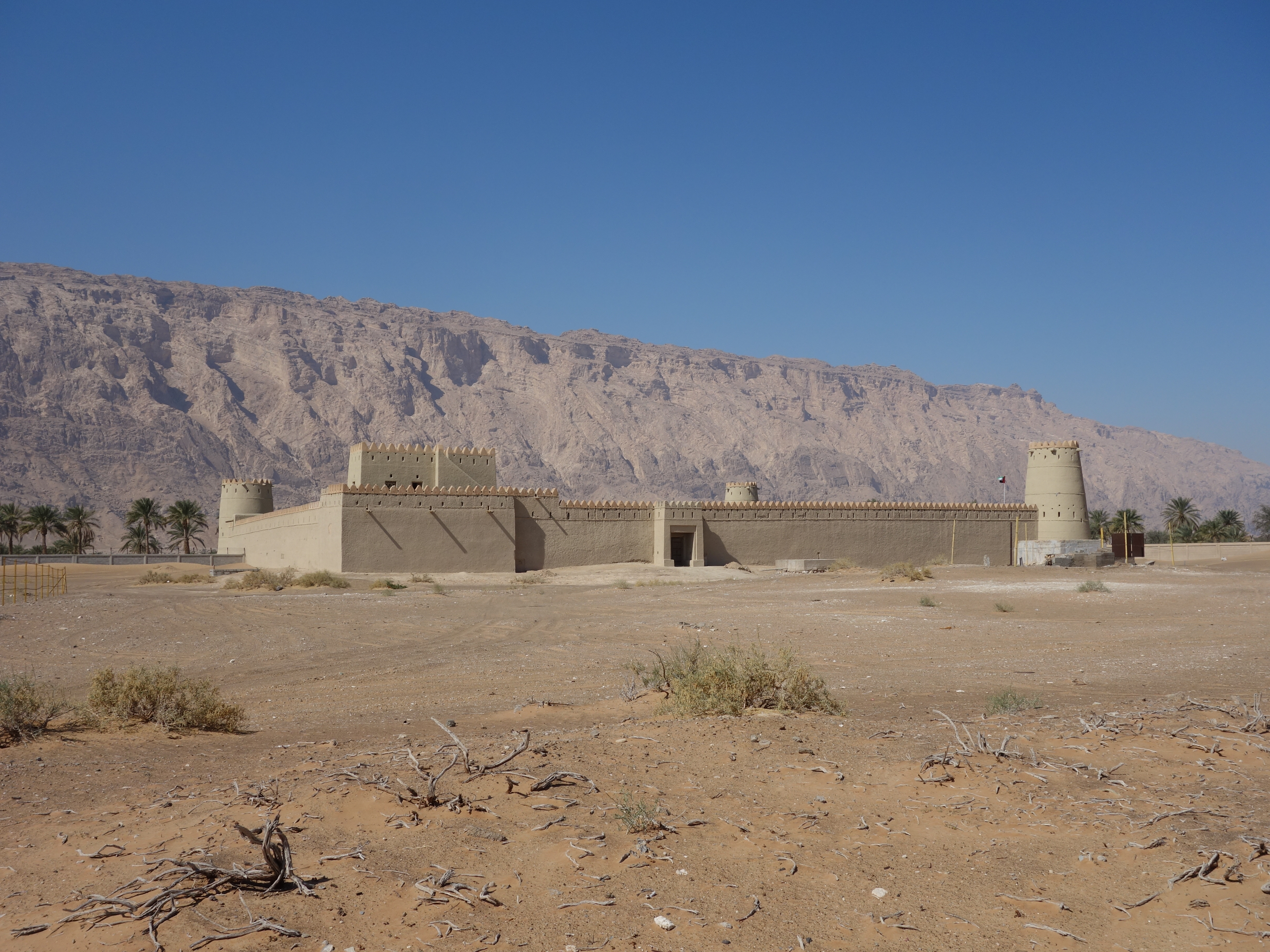
- The fort with Jebel Hafeet in the background

Location
- Location in the U.A.E.
- Location within United Arab Emirates Location within Persian Gulf Location within West and Central Asia
- Coordinates: 24°1′16″N 55°50′0″E

Site history
- Built: Possibly in the 19th century

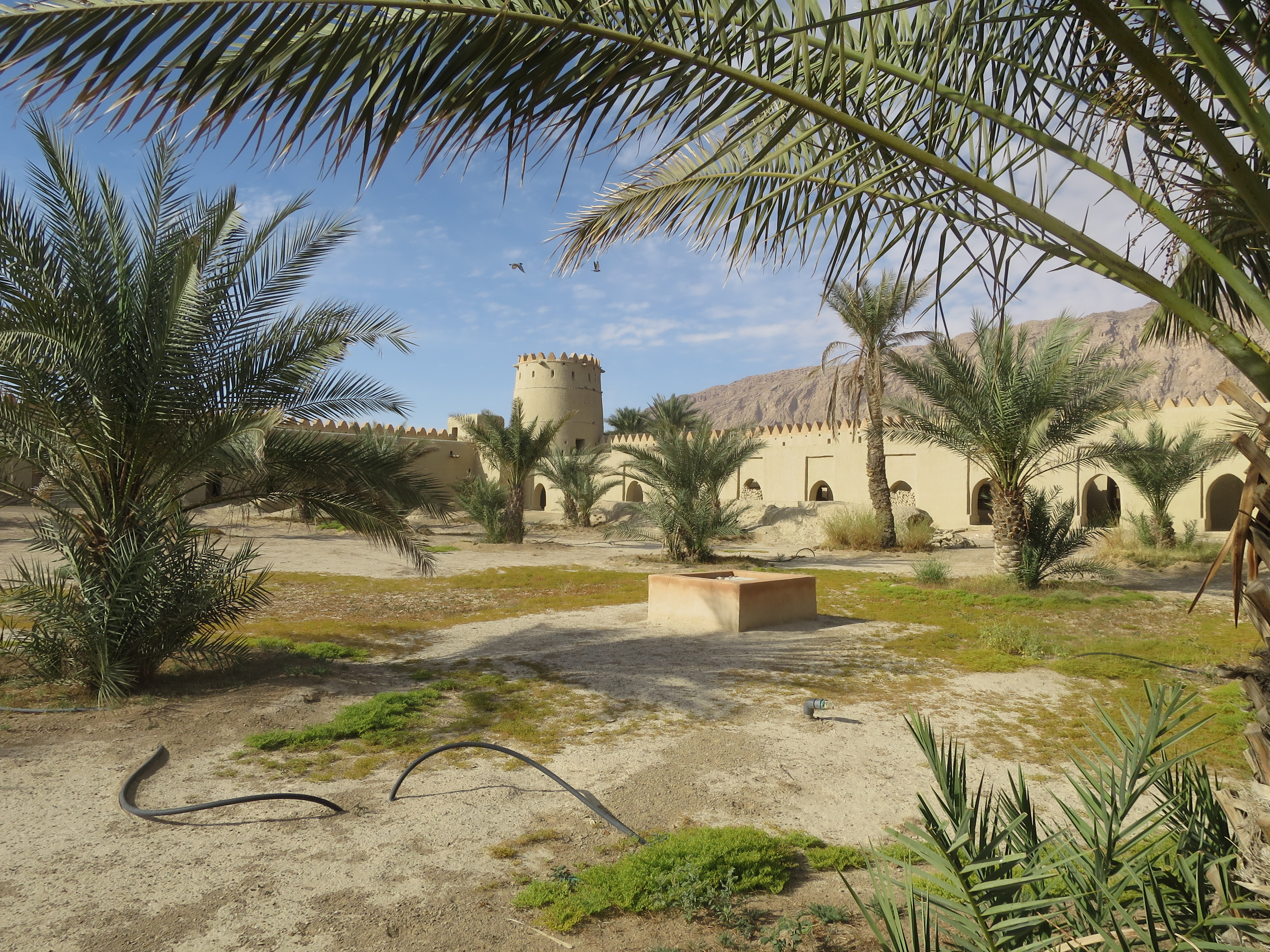
Interior of Mezyad Fort

Mezyad Fort (Arabic: قَلْعَة مَزْيَد, romanized: Qalʿat Mazyad) is a historical fort located to the east of Jebel Hafeet, and near the Hafit tombs of the Early Bronze Age, and the border crossing with Oman. Given that it is similar in appearance to the Jahili fort of the 19th century, it is thought to have been constructed at around the same time, during the reign of Sheikh Zayed bin Khalifa Al Nahyan.

== Transport ==
Mezyad lies on a route from the main part of Al-Ain to Oman, leading to Dhank, Ibri and Nizwa, and going through the Western Hajar Mountains. Named "Zayed Bin Sultan Street", it goes past Al-Ain's traditional camel market, near Bawadi Mall.

== See also ==
- Al Buraimi Governorate
- Al-Buraimi Oasis
- Hugh Boustead
