= Ghayl Fort =

- Location within United Arab Emirates
- Coordinates: 25°0′0″N 56°20′0″E
- Country: United Arab Emirates
- Emirate: Sharjah
- Elevation: 21 m (69 ft)

Ghayl Fort is located inland of the coastal city of Kalba in Sharjah, United Arab Emirates. Built in the late C19th, the current fort was constructed on top of the foundations of a C17th watchtower.

== The fort ==
The 18th century construction of Ghayl Fort was commenced by Ali Bin Zahi in 1800 but completed by Sheikh Saeed bin Hamad Al Qasimi, the Al Qasimi Wali of Kalba. Four and a half kilometres inland of Kalba, the fort has a commanding view of the lower reaches of the Wadi Helo. The entrance to the fort faces West and it has a prominent four-story watchtower to the North. With an inner area of 15 x 20 metres, the fort was reduced once again to the role of watchtower in the 20th century before being restored. Saeed bin Hamad Al Qasimi also maintained a seaside house in Kalba.

== History ==
The area was long dominated by Mazari tribesmen, latterly by Khawatir.

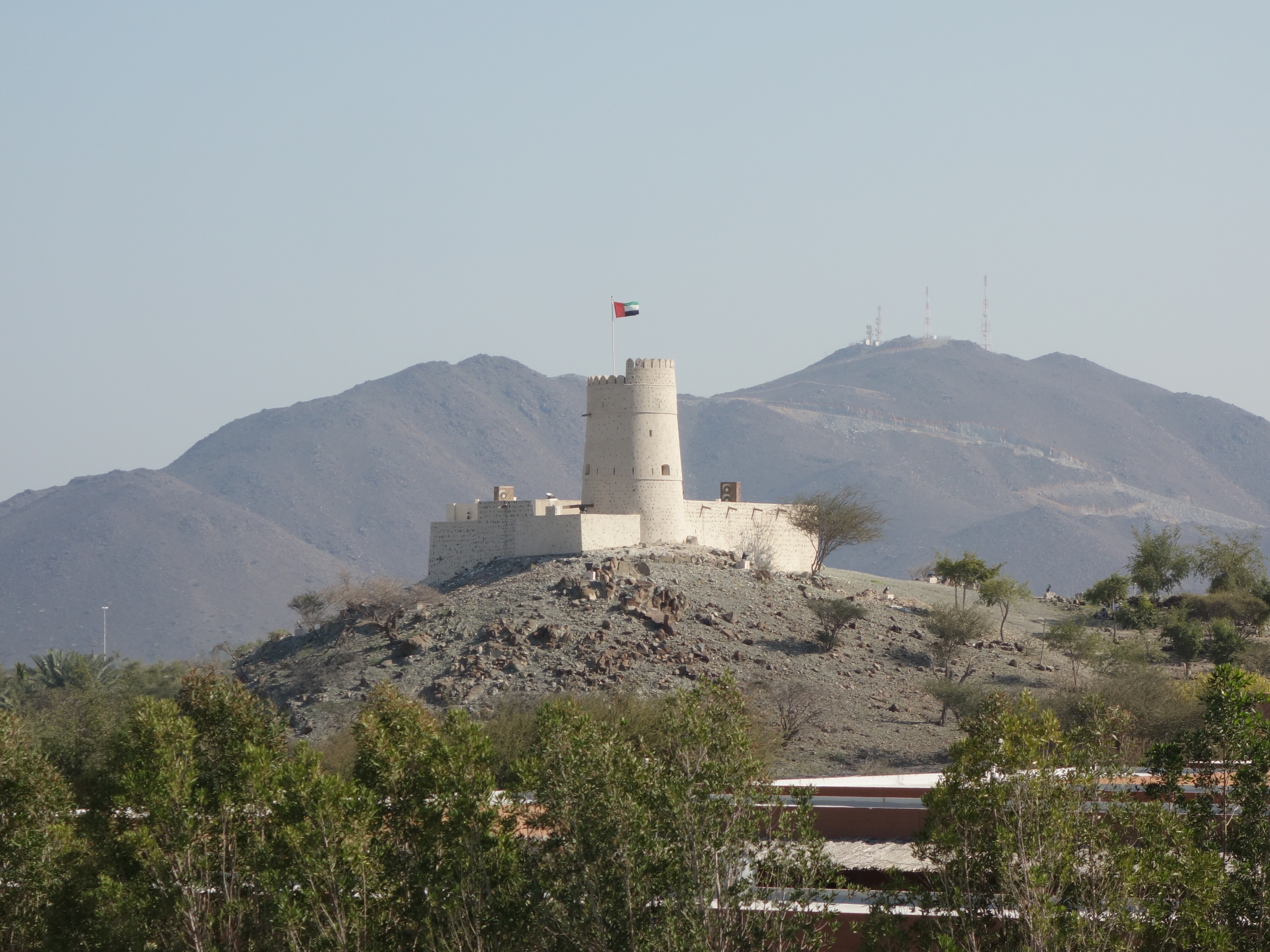
Al Ghayl Fort

Restored in 2001, the Fort is located adjacent the Kalba Birds of Prey Centre and forms part of the Centre property.
