= Al Ain Region =

Al Ain Region Minṭaqat Al-ʿAyn (مِنْطَقَة ٱلْعَيْن) Al Sharqia Eastern Region Al-Minṭaqah Aš-Šarqiyyah (ٱلْمِنْطَقَة ٱلشَّرْقِيَّة)
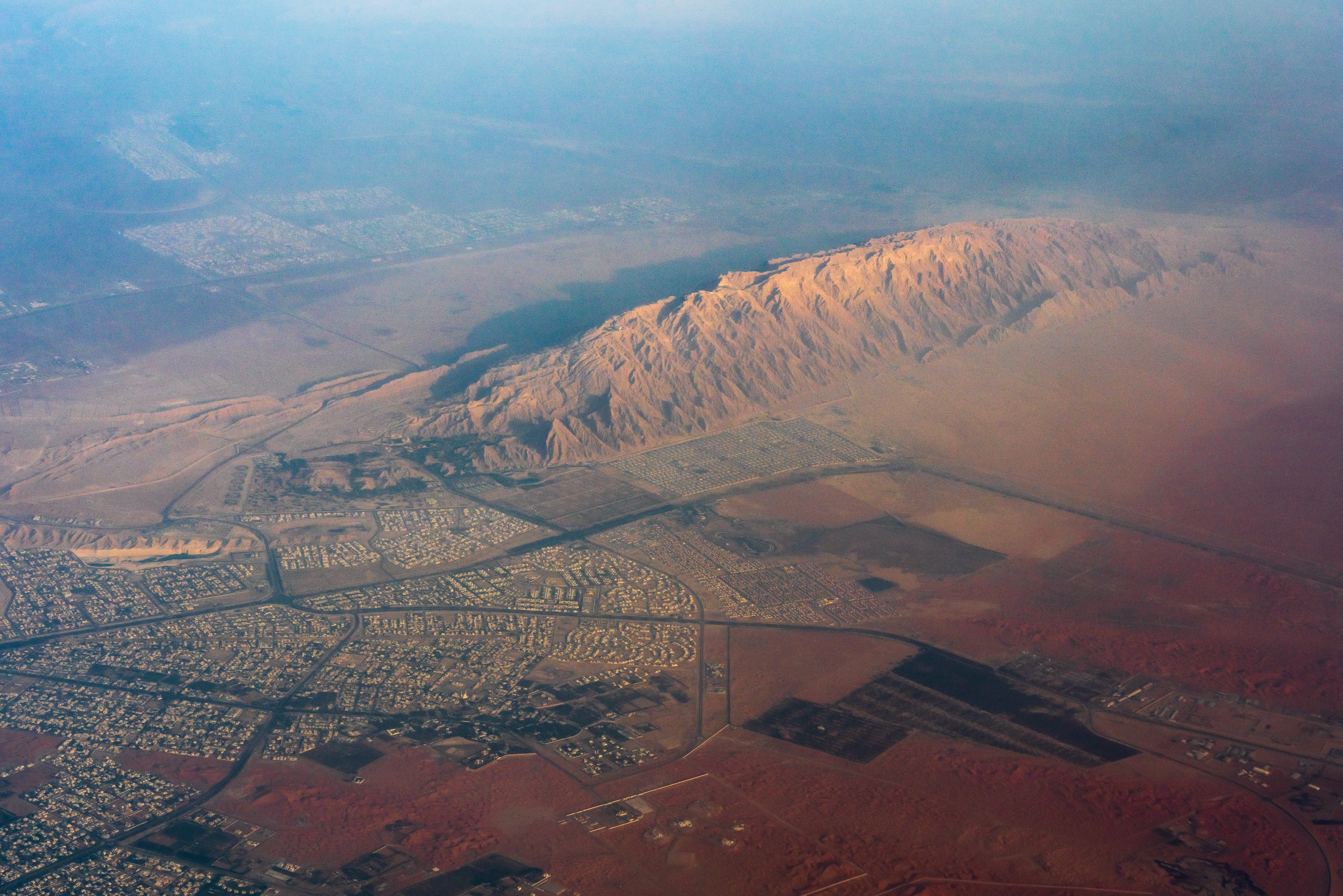
- Aerial view of Jebel Hafeet, city of Al Ain, and areas of the Arabian desert

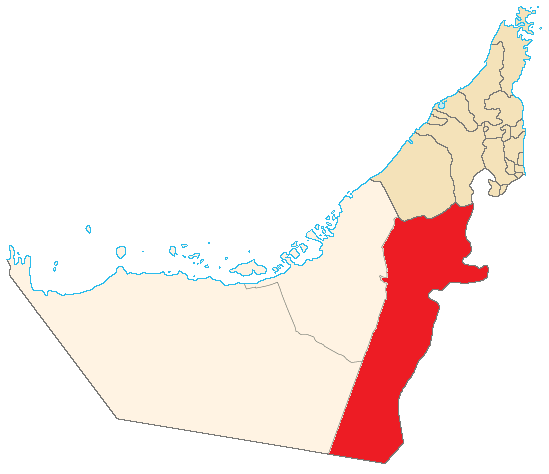
- Location of the Eastern Region in the Emirate of Abu Dhabi
- Coordinates: 24°12′27″N 55°44′41″E
- Country: United Arab Emirates
- Emirate: Abu Dhabi
- Seat: Al Ain

Government
  - Type: Absolute monarchy
  - Sheikh: Mohamed bin Zayed Al Nahyan
  - Ruler's Representative of the Eastern Region of the Emirate of Abu Dhabi: Hazza bin Zayed Al Nahyan

Population (2023)
  - Total: 1,009,735
- Time zone: UTC+4 (UAE standard time)
  - Summer (DST): UTC+4

The Eastern Region (Arabic: ٱلْمِنْطَقَة ٱلشَّرْقِيَّة, romanized: Al-Minṭaqah Aš-Šarqiyyah), officially known as Al Ain Region (Arabic: مِنْطَقَة ٱلْعَيْن, romanized: Minṭaqat al-ʿAyn), is one of three Municipal Regions in the Emirate of Abu Dhabi. It forms the southeastern part of the United Arab Emirates. Its main settlement is the eponymous city of Al Ain, located on the country's border with Oman, about 160 km (99 miles) from the city of Abu Dhabi, the capital of the Emirate and country. Compared to the Western Region, it is a rather remote region of the Emirate, smaller by area, and not known to hold reserves of gas or petroleum. However, it is agriculturally important.

== History and prehistory ==
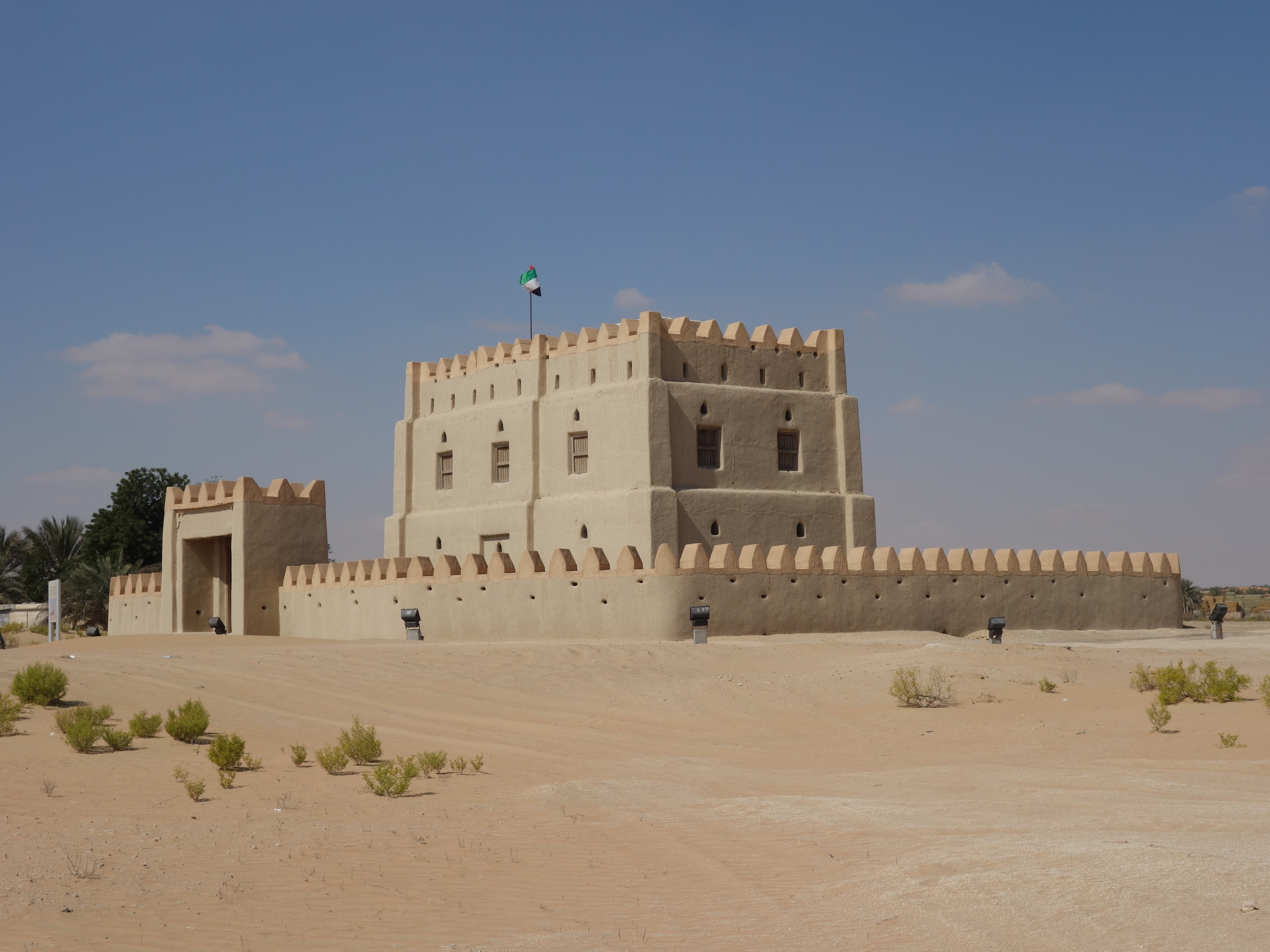
Al-'Ankah Fort in the village of Remah, between the cities of Al-Ain and Abu Dhabi

The city of Al-Ain, part of a historical region which also includes the adjacent Omani town of Al-Buraimi, is noted for its forts, oases, aflāj (underground water channels), and archaeological sites such as those of Hili and Rumailah. Sites outside the city include Jebel Hafeet and Al-A'ankah Fort. Sheikh Zayed bin Sultan Al Nahyan had been the Ruler's Representative in this region, before becoming the Ruler of Abu Dhabi and President of the United Arab Emirates. In March 2017, Sheikh Khalifa bin Zayed al-Nahyan renamed the region as Al Ain Region.

== Demographics and settlements ==
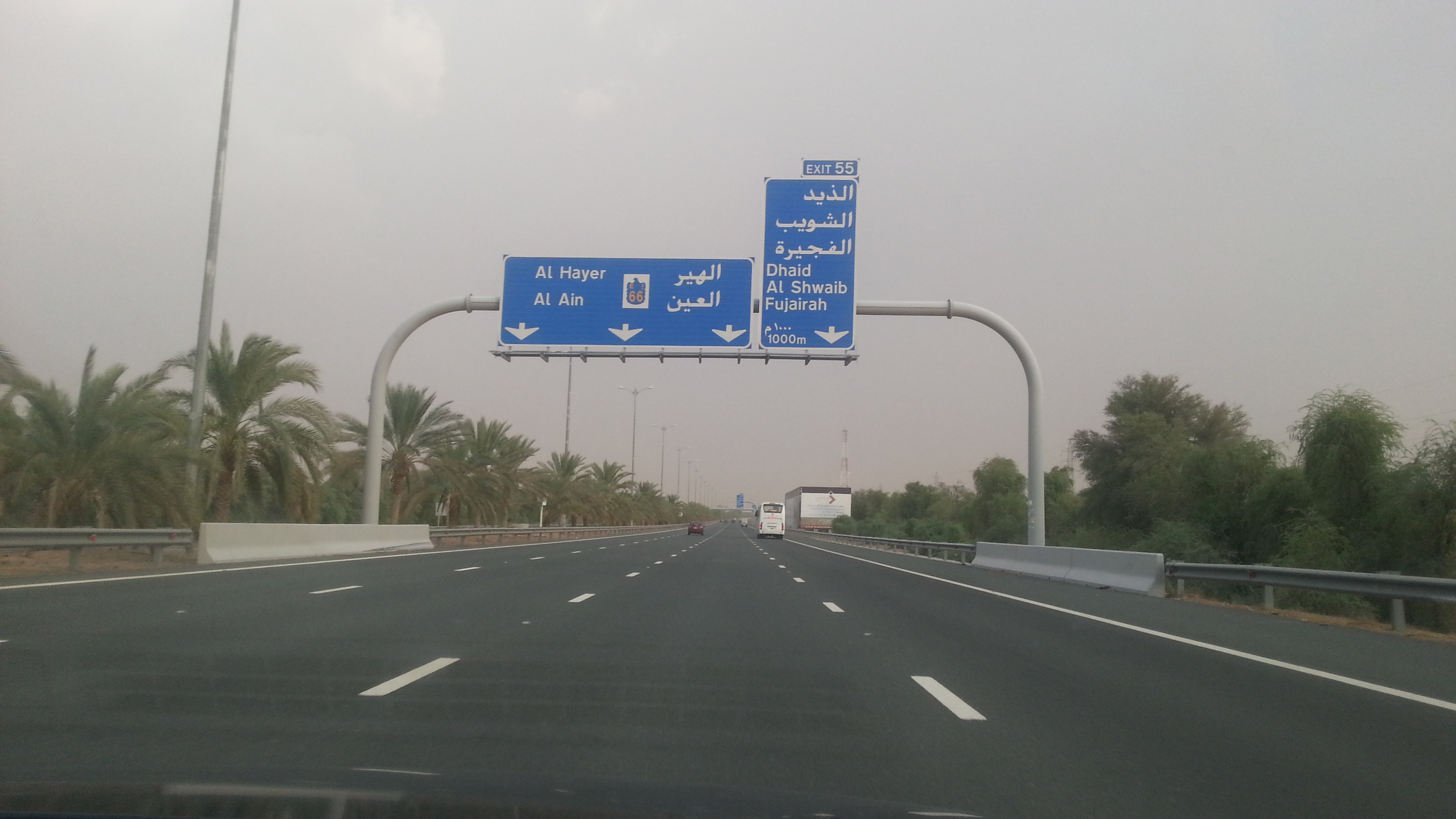
A sign on the E66 highway between Al-Ain and Dubai near Al-Faqa', with the names of Al-Hayer, Al-Ain and Ash-Shwaib within the region, besides Al-Dhaid and Al-Fujairah outside the Emirate

As of 2009, the population of the region was estimated at 890,000.

Aside from the main city, there are about 20 settlements which are governed by the region's municipal body, that is Al Ain Municipality. Most of them are estimated to have populations of no more than 10,000. They include:

- Al-Faqa' (partly in the Emirate of Dubai, on the road from Al-Ain to Dubai)
- Al-Hayer
- Al-Qu'a
- Al-Shwaib (on the road to Al Madam in the Emirate of Sharjah)
- Al-Wagan
- Al-Yahar
- Mezyad
- Nahel
- Remah
- Sa'ah
- Sweihan

== See also ==
- Abu Dhabi Region
- Al Ain International Airport
- Al-Buraimi Governorate (adjacent)
- Ash Sharqiyah (disambiguation)
- Lake Zakher
- List of tourist attractions in the United Arab Emirates
- Wildlife of the United Arab Emirates
