= Sharjah Petroleum Department =

Government body overseeing oil and gas in the Emirate of Sharjah

- دائرة النفط في الشارقة; Dāʾirat an-Nafṭ fī ash-Shāriqah

Agency overview
- Formed: 1999 (as the Petroleum Council)
- Preceding agency: Department of Petroleum and Minerals
- Jurisdiction: Emirate of Sharjah
- Headquarters: Sharjah, United Arab Emirates
- Agency executives: Sultan bin Ahmed Al Qasimi, Chairman; Mohammed bin Ahmed Al Qasimi, Deputy Chairman; Hatem Mohammed Al Mosa, Director-General

The Sharjah Petroleum Department (Arabic: دائرة النفط في الشارقة), known from 1999 to 2024 as the Sharjah Petroleum Council, is a government body of the Emirate of Sharjah in the United Arab Emirates that manages the emirate's oil and gas affairs and sets its petroleum policy. It traces its origins to the Department of Petroleum and Minerals; the Petroleum Council was established by an Emiri law in October 1999 to replace the department and take over its functions, and on 28 October 2024 an Emiri decree renamed it the Sharjah Petroleum Department.

Ahmed bin Sultan Al Qasimi headed the body from 1 December 1980 until his death on 9 July 2020. Since August 2021 it has been chaired by his son, Sultan bin Ahmed Al Qasimi, the Deputy Ruler of Sharjah, with his brother Mohammed bin Ahmed Al Qasimi as deputy chairman.

== History ==
=== Department of Petroleum and Minerals ===
The council dates the establishment of Sharjah's Department of Petroleum and Minerals to 1969, while the 1999 law establishing the council states that the department was created by Emiri Decree No. 1 of 1972. Ahmed bin Sultan Al Qasimi was chosen as the department's director on 1 December 1980. Milestones of that period listed in the council's published timeline include the first oil export from the Mubarak field in 1974, the signing of a petroleum concession agreement in 1978, the completion of the first exploration well at Sajaa in 1980, the start-up of the Sajaa plant in 1982, and the establishment of the Sharjah Liquefied Petroleum Gas Company (SHALCO) in 1984.

=== Petroleum Council (1999–2024) ===
In October 1999 the Ruler of Sharjah, Sultan bin Muhammad Al-Qasimi, issued an Emiri law establishing a petroleum council for the emirate, with financial and administrative independence and responsibility for all affairs of the oil industry; the law abolished the Department of Petroleum and Minerals and transferred its functions to the council. Under the law, the council's duties include setting the emirate's petroleum policy, including refining and manufacturing; preparing studies and plans for exploring and developing petroleum resources; making recommendations to the Ruler on the award of concessions and supervising concession holders; monitoring petroleum exports and production volumes; and representing the government in oil and mineral investment companies in which it holds stakes. Ahmed bin Sultan Al Qasimi remained at the head of the body after the council was established, and his son Sultan bin Ahmed served as its deputy chairman from 1999.

On 13 January 2019 the Government of Sharjah awarded the Italian company Eni three onshore concessions to explore for and develop oil and gas, in a 30-year partnership with the Sharjah National Oil Corporation, which had conducted the licensing round on behalf of the Petroleum Council; Eni operates two of the three areas and the national company the third.

After Ahmed bin Sultan Al Qasimi died on 9 July 2020, the Ruler issued Emiri Decree No. 26 of 2021 on 9 August 2021 appointing Sultan bin Ahmed Al Qasimi chairman of the Petroleum Council, and Decree No. 27 appointing his brother Mohammed bin Ahmed Al Qasimi deputy chairman.

=== Petroleum Department (since 2024) ===
On 28 October 2024 the Ruler issued an Emiri decree replacing the name "Petroleum Council in the Emirate of Sharjah" with "Petroleum Department" wherever it appears in legislation and in all administrative, financial and legal transactions, and a further decree appointing Hatem Mohammed Al Mosa as the department's director-general; he had served as the council's secretary-general for nearly a decade. On the same day an Emiri decree established the emirate's Energy Council, chaired by the Crown Prince, Sultan bin Mohammed bin Sultan Al Qasimi, whose members include the chairman and deputy chairman of the Petroleum Department.

== Chairmen ==
Period	Chairman	Capacity
1 December 1980 – 9 July 2020	Ahmed bin Sultan Al Qasimi	Director of the Department of Petroleum and Minerals, then chairman of the Petroleum Council from 1999
Since 9 August 2021	Sultan bin Ahmed Al Qasimi	Chairman of the Petroleum Council, then of the Petroleum Department from 2024

== See also ==
- Sharjah National Oil Corporation
- Government of Sharjah
