= Ahmed bin Sultan Al Qasimi =

Emirati royal and politician (1948–2020)

Sheikh Ahmed bin Sultan Al Qasimi
- Ahmed bin Sultan Al Qasimi

Deputy Ruler of Sharjah
- In office 30 June 1990 – 9 July 2020
- Monarch: Sultan bin Muhammad Al-Qasimi
- Succeeded by: Sultan bin Ahmed Al Qasimi (from 2021)

Chairman of the Sharjah Petroleum Council (Department of Petroleum and Minerals until 1999)
- In office 1 December 1980 – 9 July 2020
- Monarch: Sultan bin Muhammad Al-Qasimi
- Succeeded by: Sultan bin Ahmed Al Qasimi (from 2021)

Minister of State of the United Arab Emirates
- In office January 1977 – 20 November 1990

Minister of Justice of the United Arab Emirates
- In office 19 February 1972 – January 1977
- Prime Minister: Maktoum bin Rashid Al Maktoum
- Preceded by: Abdullah Omran Taryam
- Succeeded by: Mohammed Abdulrahman Al Bakr

Personal details
- Born: Ahmed bin Sultan bin Saqr bin Khalid bin Sultan Al Qasimi; 1948 Sharjah
- Died: 9 July 2020 (aged 71–72) London, United Kingdom
- Resting place: Al Jubail Cemetery, Sharjah
- Spouse: Noura bint Ahmed Al Mualla
- Children: Sultan; Mohammed; Saqr; Khalid; Ghada; Rasha; Latifa
- Parents: Sultan bin Saqr Al Qasimi II (father); Latifa bint Saeed Al Qutbi (mother)
- Relatives: Saqr; Shaikha; Khalid; Muhammad; Salim; Noura; Abdullah; Saud; Azza; Alya (siblings); Sultan bin Muhammad Al-Qasimi (cousin); Al Qasimi (family)
- Occupation: Politician, businessman

Sheikh Ahmed bin Sultan bin Saqr Al Qasimi (Arabic: أحمد بن سلطان القاسمي; 1948 – 9 July 2020) was an Emirati royal and politician who served as Deputy Ruler of the Emirate of Sharjah from 1990 until his death. A member of the ruling Al Qasimi family of Sharjah, he was a son of Sheikh Sultan bin Saqr Al Qasimi II, who ruled Sharjah from 1924 to 1951, and a half-brother of Sheikh Saqr bin Sultan Al Qasimi. Having been a founding member of the emirate's Executive Council when it was set up in 1987, he was appointed Deputy Ruler by Emiri decree on 30 June 1990. The appointment was made by Sheikh Sultan bin Muhammad Al-Qasimi, the Ruler of Sharjah. In that office, and as chairman of the Petroleum Council, he signed oil and gas exploration agreements concluded by the Sharjah government between 2000 and 2011.

Entering the federal government as minister of justice, he served from 1972 to 1977, and during his tenure the ministry worked to build the federal judiciary. The 1973 law on the Federal Supreme Court was issued on a proposal from the Ministry of Justice; he worked to bring local judicial bodies under the ministry and the federal courts, and sought judges from other Arab countries. The country's first judicial agreement with an Arab state, concluded with Tunisia in 1975, was also made during his time at the ministry. Minister of state from 1977, he remained in the cabinet until 1990.

In Sharjah he headed the Department of Petroleum and Minerals, which became the Petroleum Council in 1999, from 1 December 1980 until his death. He announced the date of the first crude export from the Sajaa field in 1982 and, that same year, signed an agreement to run the power stations of the northern emirates on gas from the field. Under his chairmanship the council opened an onshore licensing round in 2018, and he described the 2020 gas discovery at the Mahani-1 well as a historic discovery. Among his other posts were the chairmanships of the Sharjah Liquefied Gas Company (SHALCO) and the National Bank of Sharjah, and the honorary chairmanship of Dana Gas. He died in London on 9 July 2020.

== Early life and family ==
Location of the Emirate of Sharjah (red) within the United Arab Emirates

Ahmed bin Sultan Al Qasimi was born in Sharjah in 1948 to Sultan bin Saqr Al Qasimi II, who ruled the emirate from 1924 until 1951, and was the youngest of his father's seven sons. His mother, Latifa bint Saeed bin Salim bin Bainuna Al Qutbi, was the third wife of Sultan bin Saqr; his full siblings were Abdullah, Saud and two sisters, Azza and Alya. His half-siblings were Saqr and Shaikha, whose mother was Noura bint Abdulrahman Al Shamsi, and Khalid, Muhammad, Salim and Noura, whose mother was Meera bint Muhammad bin Salim Al Suwaidi. Muhammad bin Sultan Al Qasimi was the father of Sultan bin Muhammad bin Sultan Al Qasimi, Crown Prince and Deputy Ruler of Sharjah.

== Minister of Justice (1972–1977) ==
King Hussein of Jordan receives Minister of Justice Ahmed bin Sultan Al Qasimi at the Royal Hashemite Court, Amman, May 1972

Ahmed bin Sultan was appointed minister of justice on 19 February 1972, in the second reshuffle of the first federal cabinet, and kept the portfolio in the second cabinet, formed in 1973.

=== Building the federal judiciary ===
The ministry's early work centred on building the federal judiciary. Opening the second ordinary session of the Federal National Council in 1972, the President reported that the ministry had completed two draft laws: one establishing the Federal Supreme Court, the other organising the federal judiciary and creating a public prosecution service. Ahmed bin Sultan announced in April 1973 that the court's bodies would be completed "within a few weeks" and that the public prosecution, its attorney-general and members having been nominated, would soon begin work. Federal Law No. 10 of 1973 on the Federal Supreme Court was then issued "on the proposal of the Minister of Justice", as its preamble states, and published in the Official Gazette on 2 August 1973.

=== Local courts and federal legislation ===
A series of steps followed in 1974 to organise judicial work and to bring local judicial bodies under the ministry. After Abu Dhabi's judicial institutions were merged into the ministry, he set up a judicial committee and a financial and administrative committee in February to coordinate their work. He also directed the Fatwa and Legislation Department to represent ministries before the courts and to compile the country's laws and decrees into a legal encyclopedia. Touring the northern emirates in May, he presented their rulers with a draft law, prepared by the ministry, transferring the jurisdiction of local judicial bodies to the federal courts. Decision No. 4 of 1974, which he issued in July, then linked the local judicial bodies and the justice department of the Emirate of Abu Dhabi "fully and directly" to the Minister of Justice. His role extended to federal legislation more widely. He chaired the legislation committee in 1976; in January it examined draft laws including one establishing the United Arab Emirates University, and in April it approved the preparation of a draft federal decree on the UAE joining an international satellite organisation. He also chaired the joint committee of the Council of Ministers and the Federal National Council that examined the nationality and naturalisation law in March 1976.

=== Recruiting judges ===
In May 1972 he toured Kuwait, Jordan, Sudan, Egypt, Lebanon and Syria to strengthen cooperation with Arab states. In Jordan he said the aim was to study the judicial system and select Jordanian judges to work in the UAE; in Lebanon, to study the Lebanese judicial systems; and his talks in Damascus aimed at an agreement under which Syria would supply judges and legal personnel. In September 1973 he led a delegation to Baghdad, where President Ahmed Hassan al-Bakr received him on 20 September. The visit produced an agreement on judicial and legislative cooperation, under which Iraq's justice ministry would train Emirati staff in court, public-prosecution and investigation work, lend the services of a number of judicial investigators to the UAE and supply it with Iraqi laws in force. In addition, he announced in January 1976 the cabinet's approval of a special pay scale, drawn up by the ministry, raising the salaries of judges and members of the judicial and legal services.

=== Arab judicial cooperation ===
Among Arab states, he hosted the Tunisian minister of justice in March 1974 for talks at which the Tunisian side presented a draft agreement on judicial cooperation. The agreement was concluded in Tunis on 7 February 1975 and ratified by Federal Decree No. 32 of 1975, issued "on the proposal of the Minister of Justice". It was the country's first judicial agreement with an Arab state. He arrived in Damascus on 21 February 1975 at the head of a delegation of judges, on an official visit to discuss judicial and legal cooperation between the two countries. He went on to lead the UAE delegation to a seminar on unifying laws in the Arab countries, held by the Union of Arab Jurists at its headquarters in Baghdad in February 1976.

== Minister of State (1977–1990) ==
His tenure at the Ministry of Justice ended with the formation of the third federal government in January 1977, when he became a minister of state and the justice portfolio passed to Mohammed Abdulrahman Al Bakr. In the fourth cabinet, formed in 1979, he was again minister of state. The federal cabinet appointed him to the board of the Emirates General Petroleum Corporation in 1987, and he was still a member in October 1989. In Sharjah, he was a founding member of the emirate's Executive Council, to which Emiri Decree No. 12 of 1987 named him when the council was established that July. His time as minister of state lasted until the fifth federal cabinet was formed on 20 November 1990.

== Deputy Ruler of Sharjah (1990–2020) ==
=== Appointment ===
Sultan bin Muhammad Al-Qasimi, Ruler of Sharjah, with Ahmed bin Sultan Al Qasimi and Sultan bin Zayed Al Nahyan at Al Mushrif Palace, Abu Dhabi, July 1990

Sultan bin Muhammad Al-Qasimi, the Ruler of Sharjah, issued Emiri Decree No. 18 of 1990 on 30 June 1990, appointing him Deputy Ruler and head of the Department of Petroleum and Minerals. He was not included in the fifth federal cabinet formed that November; Middle East Economic Survey attributed this to his recent appointment as Deputy Ruler. He remained Deputy Ruler for thirty years, until his death, and in February 2008 became one of the Ruler's three deputies, when the Ruler appointed Sheikh Abdullah bin Salem Al Qasimi as a deputy ruler.

=== Oil and gas agreements ===
Ahmed bin Sultan Al Qasimi with the Ruler of Sharjah

As Deputy Ruler and chairman of the Petroleum Council, he signed several oil and gas exploration agreements concluded by the Sharjah government. They included a concession with the US company Metco, signed on 30 April 2000 and covering offshore areas off the emirate's east coast. A 20-year sub-contract agreement with RAK Petroleum followed on 9 July 2008, creating the East Sajaa concession area. The Rex Oil and Gas agreement of June 2011, which he signed on the government's behalf, was a 23-year concession for offshore exploration off Khor Fakkan and Kalba.

== Petroleum and business ==
=== Department of Petroleum and Minerals ===
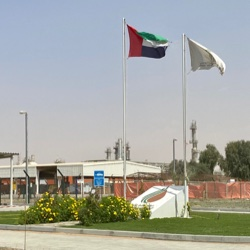
Entrance to the Sajaa gas plant, 2020

By Emiri Decree No. 65 of 1980, Ahmed bin Sultan was appointed head of the Department of Petroleum and Minerals with effect from 1 December 1980; the department, established by Emiri Decree No. 1 of 1972, was responsible for the emirate's petroleum and mineral affairs. He held the post while serving as a federal minister of state. He announced in January 1982 that the first shipment of crude from the Sajaa field, discovered in December 1980, would be exported on 15 May that year at an initial rate of 25,000 barrels per day. Projects to produce and export gas, he added, were under study.

With the federal minister of petroleum, Mana Saeed Al Otaiba, he signed an agreement in December 1982 to run the northern emirates' power stations on Sajaa gas instead of diesel, in a project carried out by the Emirates General Petroleum Corporation. He ratified the gas purchase agreement between the federal Ministry of Electricity and Water and Amoco Sharjah to supply those stations on 5 June 1994.

=== Petroleum Council ===
When the Petroleum Council replaced the department under Law No. 1 of 1999 in October that year, Emiri Decree No. 15 of 1999 named him its chairman and his son Sheikh Sultan bin Ahmed its deputy chairman. The decrees that later revised the council's membership, No. 18 of 2000 and No. 19 of 2006, kept him as chairman, a post he held until his death. Under his chairmanship the council opened an onshore licensing round in 2018. At its opening he said that the new partnerships in petroleum exploration and development would strengthen the move towards greater private-sector participation. When the gas discovery at the Mahani-1 well was announced on 27 January 2020, he described it as a historic discovery.

=== Corporate roles ===
In the corporate sector, he chaired the board of the Sharjah Liquefied Gas Company (SHALCO), which was established in 1984 to make use of gas from the Sajaa field. He was still chairman in March 2009, when the partnership agreement ended and its ownership passed entirely to the Government of Sharjah. Named honorary chairman of Dana Gas, a Sharjah-based natural-gas producer, ahead of its initial public offering in September 2005, he chaired its constituent general assembly on 16 November that year, at which the company's incorporation was declared final. Its extraordinary general meeting of July 2007, which he chaired, unanimously approved an issue of convertible sukuk. Elected honorary chairman by its general assembly in June 2012, he still held the title in 2019.

He was chairman of the National Bank of Sharjah, later Sharjah Islamic Bank, in 1983 and 1989. As deputy chairman of the Sharjah Economic Development Corporation, he signed an agreement in September 1986 with the South Korean company Hyundai Pipe to set up a joint company building a welded steel-pipe plant at Sajaa. The plant, he said after the signing, would be the first of its kind in the country.

== Personal life ==
Ahmed bin Sultan married Sheikha Noura bint Ahmed bin Abdullah bin Rashid bin Yousef Al Mualla. Their sons are Sultan, Mohammed, Saqr and Khalid, and their daughters Ghada, Rasha and Latifa. The sons of Mohammed bin Abdulaziz Al-Siddiqi of Saudi Arabia sent him a collection of poetic exchanges between their father and his own father, Sultan bin Saqr Al Qasimi. Ahmed bin Sultan passed them to the Ruler of Sharjah, who edited and published them in 2017.

== Honours and death ==
=== Honours ===
The president of the Federal Supreme Court, Abdul Wahab Abdool, honoured him among the former justice ministers at a ceremony in October 2013 marking the court's 40th anniversary.

=== Death and tributes ===
Ahmed bin Sultan died in London on 9 July 2020. His death was announced by the Sharjah Ruler's Court, and the Ministry of Presidential Affairs issued a statement of mourning. Three days of official mourning were declared in Sharjah, with flags flown at half-mast, and three days of mourning were also declared in Ajman, Ras Al Khaimah and Umm Al Quwain. The Ruler of Sharjah led the funeral prayer the following day, and Ahmed bin Sultan was buried at Al Jubail Cemetery in Sharjah. Funeral prayers in absentia were held for him in all of the emirate's mosques.

The Sharjah Government Media Bureau's obituary said that he had been "close to national work since his early youth", and described him as a witness to the emirate's growth and a supporter of younger generations. Abdulaziz Al Musallam eulogised him in an article titled "The last of the sons of Sultan bin Saqr", writing that he had "devoted himself to the nation for nearly half a century".
