= SNOC =

SNOC or snoc may be:

- Sharjah National Oil Corporation, the National Oil Company for the Emirate of Sharjah in the United Arab Emirates
- Singapore National Olympic Council, Singaporean registered society recognised by the International Olympic Committee
- Seychelles National Oil Company, state-owned oil company formed in 1984
- snoc, a function in computer programming for adding elements to the end of a list
- Satellite network operations center, from which network monitoring and control is exercised over a satellite network
- Saturday Night on Campus, a student activity at Cornerstone University, Grand Rapids, Michigan, United States
- Aeroporto de Canindé de São Francisco (ICAO code SNOC), airport in Canindé de São Francisco, Sergipe, Brazil
