= Royal European Academy of Doctors =

Academy of doctorate holders in Barcelona, Spain

- Real Academia Europea de Doctores
- Abbreviation: RAED
- Formation: 1914
- Headquarters: Via Laietana 32, Barcelona, Spain
- Website: raed.academy

The Royal European Academy of Doctors (Spanish: Real Academia Europea de Doctores; Catalan: Reial Acadèmia Europea de Doctors; RAED) is an academy of holders of doctoral degrees in all fields of knowledge, devoted to research in those fields and based in Barcelona, Spain. It traces its origins to 1914, received the title "Royal" in 1989 and added "European" to its name in 2016.

== History ==
The academy began in 1914 as the Agrupación de Doctores Matriculados de Cataluña (Association of Registered Doctors of Catalonia). After a congress of doctors held in Barcelona in 1915, the association was formally constituted in May 1919, with Àlvar Esquerdo as its first president. In 1920 it took the name Col·legi de Doctors Matriculats de Catalunya and in 1924, during the dictatorship of Miguel Primo de Rivera, it was renamed Col·legi de Doctors Matriculats del Districte Universitari de Barcelona. Its activity declined sharply under the Second Spanish Republic and during the Spanish Civil War, and resumed in 1943.

In 1989 it became a public-law corporation under the name Acadèmia de Doctors, regulated by Decree 90/1989 of 13 March, and on 2 October 1989 King Juan Carlos I granted it the title "Royal". It adopted its current name in 2016, after the Spanish Royal Household communicated on 2 June 2016 its approval of the addition of "European". The King of Spain holds the academy's honorary presidency. Alfredo Rocafort became its president in 2012.

== Membership ==
A doctorate is required for numerary membership, which is open to citizens of the European Union and limited to 150 members. According to the newspaper Ara, in March 2024 the academy had 100 numerary, 51 corresponding and 36 honorary academicians, and the academy says that 19 Nobel laureates are among its honorary members. Its honorary members also include the former presidents Rosalía Arteaga of Ecuador and Luis Alberto Lacalle of Uruguay. The academy is based on the third floor of the Foment del Treball building on Via Laietana in Barcelona.

== Medal of Honour ==
The academy's statutes allow its governing board to award the RAED Medal of Honour (Medalla de Honor) to people it considers deserving. The academy presented the medal to King Juan Carlos I on 29 May 2008, and in March 2025 to Sultan bin Ahmed Al Qasimi, Deputy Ruler of the Emirate of Sharjah, an award Emirati media described as the "Golden Medal of Honour". The academy also awarded its Centennial Medal to the former Brazilian president Dilma Rousseff on 12 April 2018.
