= Bodour bint Sultan bin Mohammed Al Qasimi =

Emirati cultural, higher education and business leader

Sheikha Bodour Al Qasimi
- بدور بنت سلطان القاسمي
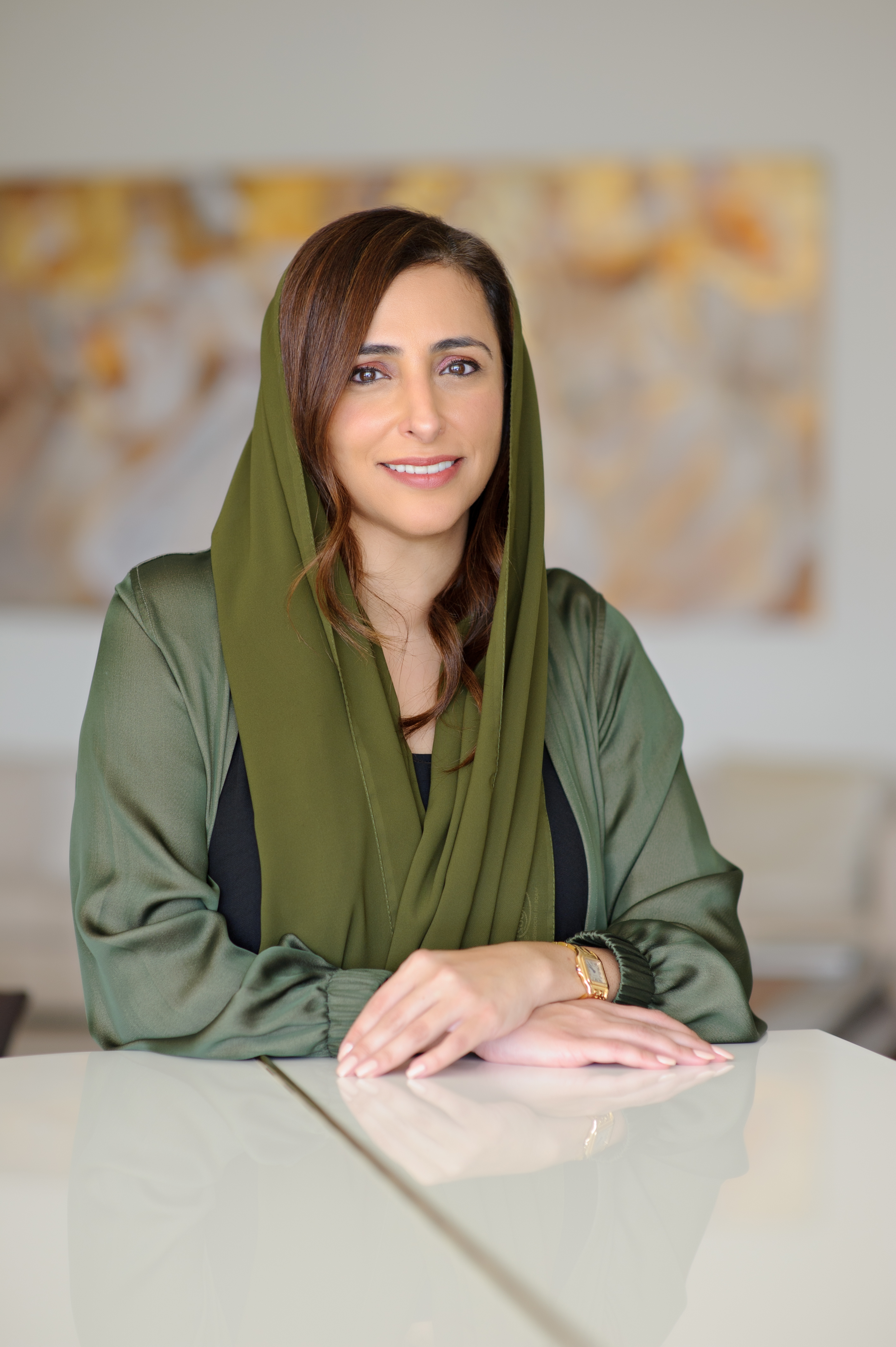
- Al Qasimi in 2022
- Born: 1978 (age 47–48); Sharjah, United Arab Emirates
- Occupations: Cultural, higher education and business leader
- Known for: President of International Publishers Association (2021–2022); President of American University of Sharjah; Founder of Kalimat Group
- Spouse: Sheikh Sultan bin Ahmed Al Qasimi
- Children: Sheikha Mariam bint Sultan Al Qasimi; Sheikh Ahmed bin Sultan Al Qasimi; Sheikha Alya bint Sultan Al Qasimi; Sheikha Meera bint Sultan Al Qasimi
- Parents: Sheikh Sultan bin Muhammad Al-Qasimi (father); Sheikha Jawaher bint Mohammed Al Qasimi (mother)

Styles of Bodour bint Sultan bin Muhammad Al Qasimi
- Reference style: Her Highness
- Spoken style: Your Highness
- Alternative style: Sheikha

Bodour bint Sultan Al Qasimi (Arabic: بدور بنت سلطان بن محمد القاسمي; born 1978) is an Emirati publisher, academic administrator, and public official. She served as President of the International Publishers Association from 2021 to late 2022 and has been President and Chairperson of the American University of Sharjah since 2022. In 2025, she was appointed UNESCO Goodwill Ambassador for Education and Book Culture.

Al Qasimi is the founder of Kalimat Group, a children's publishing house established in 2007, and chairs several Sharjah government bodies, including the Sharjah Book Authority, the Sharjah Investment and Development Authority (Shurooq), the Sharjah Research, Technology and Innovation Park (SPARK), and the Sharjah Entrepreneurship Center (Sheraa). She co-founded the Emirates Publishers Association in 2009.

== Early life and education ==
Bodour Al Qasimi was born in 1978 in Sharjah, United Arab Emirates (UAE), into the ruling Al Qasimi family. Her father is His Highness Dr Sheikh Sultan bin Muhammad Al-Qasimi, Ruler of Sharjah since 1972, and her mother is Sheikha Jawaher bint Mohammed Al Qasimi.

She earned a BA (Hons) in Archaeology and Anthropology from the University of Cambridge in 1999, followed by an MSc in Medical Anthropology from University College London in 2002. Influenced by her father's longstanding advocacy for education and social development, she subsequently pursued a career in publishing and public administration.

== Publishing career ==
Al Qasimi founded Kalimat Group in 2007, the first dedicated Arabic-language children's publisher in the UAE. The organisation today comprises five imprints catering to children, young adults, and adult readers, having extended its global reach through partnerships with publishers such as Quarto, Bloomsbury Publishing, Gallimard Jeunesse, and Penguin Random House, giving access to wider distribution in Arabic, English, and French.

Two years later, she co-founded the Emirates Publishers Association to support the UAE’s publishing sector and cultivate international engagement. That same year, she also established the UAE Board on Books for Young People (UAEBBY), the national section of the International Board on Books for Young People (IBBY), to promote literature for children and youth.

Her election to the Executive Committee of the International Publishers Association (IPA) in 2014 made her the first Arab woman to serve in that body, where she focused on advancing Arabic-language publishing, protecting copyright, and defending the freedom to publish.

In 2016, she established the Kalimat Foundation, the philanthropic arm of Kalimat Group. The foundation launched its Pledge a Library initiative in 2017, distributing books to children in refugee camps, including those in Jordan housing populations displaced by the Syrian civil war. The foundation later expanded its work to support visually impaired children through its Ara (I See) programme, providing books in audio, large print, and braille formats. Its initiatives and advocacy also helped raise awareness for the Marrakesh Treaty on accessible publishing.

Her international engagement expanded in 2018 when she chaired the committee that secured Sharjah’s selection as UNESCO World Book Capital for 2019. That same year, she was elected Vice President of the IPA, becoming the first Arab and the second woman – after Ana María Cabanellas of Argentina – to serve in the role. Her two-year term prioritised collaborations with publishers in developing countries, particularly across Africa. Through a partnership between the IPA and Dubai Cares, she established the Africa Publishing Innovation Fund, a four-year, US$800,000 initiative to promote literacy, restore libraries, and address structural challenges in the continent's publishing ecosystem, including poor distribution and widespread book piracy.

Addressing gender equality, she founded PublisHer at the London Book Fair in 2019 to support women in publishing through mentorship, policy advocacy, and visibility.

Al Qasimi began her term as President of the IPA in early 2021, this time the first Arab leader and again the second woman to serve in that capacity since its founding in 1896. The role, which concluded in December 2022, was defined by efforts to guide the publishing sector through the COVID-19 crisis, strengthen copyright protections, and promote digital transformation and female empowerment.

She was appointed Chairperson of the Sharjah Book Authority in May 2023. The Authority oversees the Sharjah International Book Fair, the Sharjah Publishers Conference, and the Sharjah Booksellers Conference. Under her leadership, Sharjah has been named Guest of Honour at prominent international book fairs, including the New Delhi Book Fair (2019), Bologna Children’s Book Fair (2022), the Guadalajara International Book Fair (2022), and Thessaloniki International Book Fair (2024).

== Authorship ==
Al Qasimi has authored books for children and adults, published through Kalimat Group.

Her picture book World Book Capital (2021), illustrated by Denise Damanti, introduces young readers to the UNESCO World Book Capital initiative and has been translated into eleven languages. In 2024, she published the Mommy series, illustrated by Daniela Stamatiadi, exploring the mother-child bond in infancy.

Her 2024 children's book The House of Wisdom, illustrated by Majid Zakeri Younesi, chronicles the Grand Library of Baghdad during the Islamic Golden Age. It received the BolognaRagazzi Award in the Fiction category at the 2025 Bologna Children's Book Fair, making Al Qasimi the first woman from an Arab Gulf state to receive the prize.

Also in 2025, she published Let Them Know She Is Here: Searching for the Queen of Mleiha through Rewayat, Kalimat Group's imprint for adult readers. The book blends personal reflection with archaeological research, examining evidence of matriarchal kingdoms in the Arabian Peninsula, including discoveries at Mleiha suggesting the existence of Arab queens in antiquity.

== Public service ==
Al Qasimi was appointed the first Chairperson of the Sharjah Investment and Development Authority (Shurooq), which oversees tourism and economic development in the emirate.

She led Sharjah's successful nomination of the Faya Palaeolandscape to the UNESCO World Heritage List, inscribed in recognition of evidence for human adaptation to desert environments dating to more than 200,000 years ago. In this capacity, she also oversaw the establishment of the Mleiha Archaeological Centre, which documents human settlement from the Palaeolithic through to the pre-Islamic period. Excavations at the site have yielded artefacts including Roman coinage, attesting to the region's connections with long-distance trade networks.

As part of modern-day Sharjah’s broader economic diversification strategy, Al Qasimi has also overseen the development of strategic ventures to support a knowledge-based economy, including the Sharjah Research, Technology and Innovation Park (SPARK), a hub for research and high-tech enterprise, and the Sharjah Entrepreneurship Center (Sheraa). Launched in 2016 at the American University of Sharjah, Sheraa was the UAE's first university-based start-up accelerator. By 2025, ventures supported through its incubation programmes had raised over $300 million in investment and created more than 2,600 jobs, with over half of its portfolio companies led by women.

Al Qasimi has also initiated cultural and heritage projects in Sharjah. In 2024, she founded Tanweer, an annual music and arts festival held in the Mleiha desert. In 2025, she opened Bait Elowal, a heritage restaurant and retail venue in a restored century-old house in the Heart of Sharjah district.

== Global engagement ==
In May 2015, Al Qasimi became the first Emirati woman to co-chair the World Economic Forum on the Middle East and North Africa, held at the Dead Sea in Jordan. Two years later, she assumed leadership of the Forum's Regional Business Council, again the first woman in the role.

At the Forum, she has spoken on topics including youth employment, female entrepreneurship, small and medium enterprise development, and funding for cultural industries.

In October 2025, UNESCO Director-General Audrey Azoulay appointed Al Qasimi as UNESCO Goodwill Ambassador for Education and Book Culture, recognising her global efforts to advance publishing, literacy, and educational development. The appointment was announced during the 43rd Session of the UNESCO General Conference in Paris. In accepting the role, Al Qasimi stated: "Books shape minds, connect communities, and underpin resilient, knowledge-based societies."

== Academic leadership ==
In 2022, Al Qasimi was appointed President and Chairperson of the American University of Sharjah (AUS), becoming the first woman to hold the role. As president, she has overseen curricular reforms linking academic programmes to regional economic priorities. Under her tenure, AUS rose from 383rd to 332nd in the QS World University Rankings (2022–2025).

In July 2025, the University of Leicester conferred upon Al Qasimi its inaugural Honorary Professorship — the first such title in the institution's history — at its School of Business, in recognition of her contributions to women's equality, equity in higher education, the advancement of publishing, literacy, and cultural development.

== Personal life ==
Bodour Al Qasimi is married to Sheikh Sultan bin Ahmed Al Qasimi, who is also a member of Sharjah's ruling family and was appointed in August 2021 as Deputy Ruler of Sharjah.
