= Ministry of Justice (United Arab Emirates) =

Government ministry of the United Arab Emirates

- وزارة العدل
- Logo of the UAE Ministry of Justice

Ministry overview
- Formed: 2 February 1972; 54 years ago
- Jurisdiction: Federal government of the United Arab Emirates
- Headquarters: Abu Dhabi, United Arab Emirates
- Minister responsible: Abdullah Al Nuaimi, Minister of Justice
- Website: moj.gov.ae

The Ministry of Justice (MoJ) (Arabic: وزارة العدل) of the United Arab Emirates was created in 1971, shortly after the federal government was established. The ministry oversees the court system of the United Arab Emirates and any associated prosecutorial services. Other responsibilities include appointing judges and providing licenses to attorneys, translators, and legal experts.

== List of ministers ==
- Abdullah Omran Taryam (1971–1972) [1st Minister of Justice]
- Ahmed bin Sultan Al Qasimi (1972–1977)
- Muhammed 'Abd Al-Rahman Al-Bakr (1977–1983)
- Abdallah Hamid Al-Mazrui (1984–1989)
- Muhammed bin Ahmad bin Hasan Al-Khazraji (1990) [referred to as the Minister of Justice & Islamic Affairs]
- Abdullah Omran Taryam (1990–1997)
- Muhammed Nakhira Al-Dhahiri (1997–2008)
- Hadef Joua'an Al Dhahiri (2008–2013)
- Sultan Saeed Al Badi (2014– )
- Abdullah bin Sultan bin Awad al Nuaimi

== See also ==
- Justice ministry
- Politics of the United Arab Emirates
