= Al Sajaa =

Settlement in Sharjah, UAE

Al Sajaa Industrial الصجعة الصناعية
- Community
- Interactive map of Al Sajaa Industrial
- Location of Al Sajaa in the UAE
- Coordinates: 25.3306°N 55.6435°E
- Country: United Arab Emirates
- Emirate: Sharjah
- City: Sharjah
- Established: 2008

Government
  - Type: Constitutional monarchy
  - Sheikh: Sultan bin Muhammad Al-Qasimi

Area
  - Total: 1.30 km^{2} (0.50 sq mi)
- This project is currently under development

Al Sajaa (also known as Al Saja'a) is a settlement in Sharjah, United Arab Emirates (UAE), located on the Sharjah/Dhaid highway and adjacent to the arterial behind Emirates Road (E611). It is the location of a major industrial area as well as the planned 14 million square feet industrial zone, Al Sajaa Industrial Oasis (ASIO). Developed by Sharjah Asset Management Holding (SAM), the investment arm of the government of Sharjah, the zone aims to become the largest industrial area in the UAE.

With an initial inventory of 353 development plots intended for use as industrial units, the size of plots in the zone's launch offering extended from 13,454 to 53,819 square feet. Plots include industrial, mixed use and retail units. The zone intends to capitalise on Sajaa's location close to Sharjah International Airport, the Al Hamriyah Port and Free Zone and the E611, which links the emirates on the west coast of the UAE.

== Sajaa oil and gas field ==
Sajaa Field was discovered on Amoco's concession in Sharjah, in December 1980. It is both Sharjah's largest producing field and Sharjah's first gas-condensate development.

The Sajaa Field is a retrograde gas-condensate reservoir, part of the frontal thrust sheet of the Hajar Mountains. Structurally created in the late Cretaceous, the field is in the Thamama limestone found to the east of central Sharjah. upper Jurassic carbonates have been found containing both rich gas and water, with Lower Jurassic deposits of sour gas.

The Sajaa field supplies condensate gas and liquefied natural gas to both domestic and foreign markets and has a maximum output of 800,000 cubic feet of gas per day and 50,000 barrels per day of condensate.

The nearby Hadiba field, some 10km north east of Sajaa, was discovered in May 2024 with production starting in Summer 2025. The Hadiba-01 well is tied in to the Sajaa gas processing plant and is the fifth onshore field to be operational in the emirate of Sharjah, after the Al Sajaa, Kahif, Mahani and Muayed gas fields. The exploration, production, engineering, construction, operation and maintenance of these fields is undertake by the Sharjah National Oil Corporation (SNOC).
