= Sultan bin Ahmed Al Qasimi =

Deputy Ruler of Sharjah since 2021

Dr. Sultan bin Ahmed Al Qasimi
- سلطان بن أحمد بن سلطان القاسمي
- Sultan bin Ahmed Al Qasimi

Deputy Ruler of the Emirate of Sharjah
- Incumbent
- Assumed office 9 August 2021
- Preceded by: Ahmed bin Sultan Al Qasimi (until 2020)

Deputy Chairman of the Sharjah Executive Council
- Incumbent
- Assumed office 24 April 2022

President of the University of Sharjah
- Incumbent
- Assumed office 6 December 2021

Chairman of the Sharjah Media Council
- Incumbent
- Assumed office 13 February 2017

Chairman of the Sharjah Petroleum Department
- Incumbent
- Assumed office 9 August 2021
- Preceded by: Ahmed bin Sultan Al Qasimi (until 2020)

Chairman of the Sharjah Judicial Council
- Incumbent
- Assumed office 23 October 2024

Chairman of the Sharjah Communication Technologies Authority
- Incumbent
- Assumed office 13 June 2024

Personal details
- Born: Sultan bin Ahmed bin Sultan Al Qasimi; 23 May 1973 (age 53) Sharjah, United Arab Emirates
- Spouse: Bodour bint Sultan bin Mohammed Al Qasimi
- Children: Mariam; Ahmed; Alya; Meera
- Parents: Ahmed bin Sultan Al Qasimi (father); Noura bint Ahmed Al Mualla (mother)
- Relatives: Al Qasimi (family); Mohammed; Saqr; Khalid; Ghada; Rasha; Latifa (siblings)
- Education: Arkansas State University; University of Detroit Mercy; University of Exeter
- Occupation: Politician, businessman, university president, humanitarian
- Awards: Most Prominent Media Personality, Cairo Mondial for Arts and Media (2016); Jawaher Medal of Honour, The Big Heart Foundation (2023); Golden Medal of Honour, Royal European Academy of Doctors (2025)

Sultan bin Ahmed bin Sultan Al Qasimi (Arabic: سلطان بن أحمد بن سلطان القاسمي; born 23 May 1973 in Sharjah) is an Emirati member of the ruling Al Qasimi family of Sharjah who has been Deputy Ruler of the Emirate of Sharjah, in the United Arab Emirates, since 9 August 2021. He is also deputy chairman of the emirate's Executive Council. He also chairs the Sharjah Petroleum Department, the Sharjah Media Council and the Sharjah Judicial Council, and has been president of the University of Sharjah since 2021. He is the son of Sheikh Ahmed bin Sultan Al Qasimi, who was Deputy Ruler until his death in 2020.

He holds a Bachelor of Science in Business Administration from Arkansas State University and a Master's degree in Computer Information Systems from the University of Detroit Mercy, and received a PhD in Management Studies from the University of Exeter in 2026. In the energy sector, he was deputy chairman of the Sharjah Petroleum Council from 1999 and has been its chairman since 2021; the council was renamed the Sharjah Petroleum Department in 2024. He has also chaired the Sharjah National Oil Corporation since 2010.

Outside energy, he chaired the Sharjah Commerce and Tourism Development Authority from 2006 to 2012 and has headed the emirate's government media institutions since 2010, beginning with the board of the Sharjah Media Corporation, including the Sharjah Media Council since its creation in 2017. He has also chaired the Sharjah Communication Technologies Authority since 2024 and the Judicial Council since its establishment in October 2024 as the highest authority of the emirate's new local judiciary. In October 2026 the council, chaired by him, approved a governance framework for the use of artificial intelligence in the judiciary and a specialised prosecution and court for municipal and environmental cases.

In business, he chairs Basma Group and the property developer Arada, and he has chaired Invest Bank since 2019, the year the Sharjah government took a majority stake in it. He has been humanitarian envoy of The Big Heart Foundation since 2017, and has been involved in education, health and housing projects in Asia and Africa. He is married to Sheikha Bodour bint Sultan Al Qasimi, a daughter of the Ruler of Sharjah.

== Early life and education ==
=== Parentage ===
Sultan bin Ahmed Al Qasimi was born in Sharjah on 23 May 1973. His father, Ahmed bin Sultan Al Qasimi, was appointed minister of justice on 19 February 1972, in a change to the first federal cabinet, and Deputy Ruler of Sharjah in 1990, a post he held until his death on 9 July 2020. Sultan bin Ahmed is a grandson of Sheikh Sultan bin Saqr bin Khalid Al Qasimi. His mother is Sheikha Noura bint Ahmed Al Mualla, and his brother, Sheikh Mohammed bin Ahmed Al Qasimi, is vice-president of the Sharjah National Oil Corporation (SNOC).

=== Education ===
He holds a Bachelor of Science in Business Administration from Arkansas State University and a Master's degree in Computer Information Systems from the University of Detroit Mercy. He received a PhD in Management Studies from the University of Exeter in 2026. His thesis, Beyond Satisfaction: How Student Experience Builds Reputation and Loyalty, is a longitudinal case study of the University of Sharjah, which he heads.

== Deputy Ruler and Executive Council ==
=== Appointment ===
Location of the Emirate of Sharjah (red) within the United Arab Emirates

The Ruler of Sharjah, Sheikh Sultan bin Muhammad Al-Qasimi, appointed him Deputy Ruler on 9 August 2021 by Emiri Decree No. 25 of 2021, a post his father had held until his death in July 2020. A second decree the same day made him chairman of the Sharjah Petroleum Council.

=== Executive Council ===
He had joined the Sharjah Executive Council in 2008 as chairman of the Sharjah Commerce and Tourism Development Authority. He kept his seat when the council was re-formed in 2010 (as deputy chairman of the Petroleum Council), 2012 (as chairman of the Sharjah Media Corporation) and 2014. He became the council's deputy chairman on 24 April 2022 under Emiri Decree No. 35 of 2022.

=== Institutional initiatives ===
He launched the Tamayaz institutional excellence award for the bodies he chairs in October 2023 and opened its electronic submission system in December 2024. An administrative decision by the Ruler in April 2026 placed the Al Qawasim digital platform, which documents the family history of the Qawasim, under Sultan bin Ahmed's direct supervision. He launched Selah, a separate free application for documenting the family trees of all families, in September 2026, after the Al Qawasim platform.

== Energy sector ==
=== Early roles ===
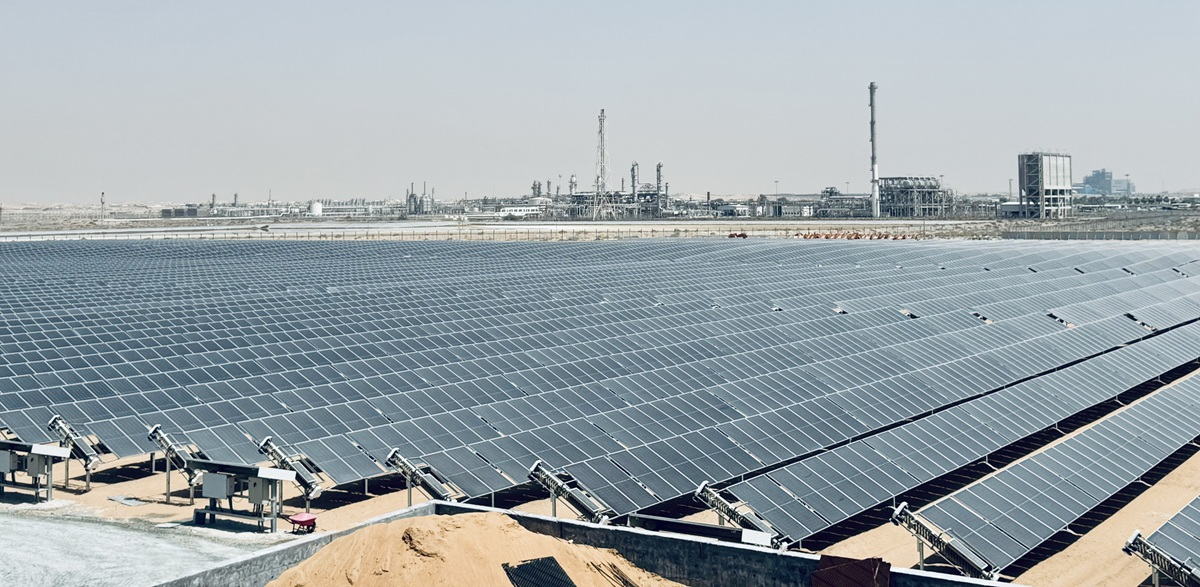
Solar power plant at the Sajaa gas complex

He was appointed deputy chairman of the Sharjah Petroleum Council, which his father chaired, when the council was first formed in 1999, and held the post until 2021. He also chaired the board of the Sharjah Pipeline Company (Anabeeb) from 2003 to 2019, and in 2004 he became deputy chairman of the board of the Sharjah Liquefied Gas Company (SHALCO). On behalf of the pipeline company, a joint venture of the Sharjah government and BP, he signed an agreement in September 2005 to build a jet-fuel storage facility linked by pipeline to Sharjah International Airport. He was also chairman of the gas-sweetening company SajGas in 2005, and said that its project would start up by the end of the year.

=== Sharjah Petroleum Department ===
He became chairman of the Petroleum Council on 9 August 2021 under Emiri Decree No. 26 of 2021, and the council was renamed the Sharjah Petroleum Department in October 2024. As head of the department, he has been a member of the emirate's Energy Council since it was formed that month, for a four-year term.

=== Sharjah National Oil Corporation ===
He has chaired the board of the Sharjah National Oil Corporation (SNOC) since his appointment by Emiri Decree No. 53 of 2010. SNOC was created by Emiri decree the same year and given the Sharjah government's share in the Sajaa field concession. As its head he signed a ten-year agreement in May 2017 to sell gas to the Sharjah Electricity and Water Authority (SEWA), with liquefied natural gas to be imported for the purpose. He said in 2018 that Sharjah was studying a large LNG import project with a German company. SNOC awarded three onshore exploration concessions to Eni in January 2019, following Sharjah's first onshore licensing round. The LNG import project was shelved in March 2020 after a new gas discovery in the emirate. SNOC and its partner Eni announced in January 2021 that the Mahani field had begun producing gas, less than a year after its discovery, in a statement that quoted him as SNOC's head. SNOC became the supplier of most of Sharjah's gas in September 2021, from its own output and from imports under a ten-year agreement with ADNOC. He said SNOC had been "entrusted" with making sure SEWA always had the gas it needed. He opened the Sana solar power plant at the Sajaa gas complex in June 2025; with a capacity of 60 megawatts, it is the emirate's largest.

== Tourism and cultural events ==
=== Commerce and Tourism Development Authority ===
He chaired the Sharjah Commerce and Tourism Development Authority from 2006 to 2012, having been appointed chairman of its board by Emiri decree in December 2006, and he remained chairman when the board was re-formed in 2010. The authority launched a new promotional identity for the emirate in April 2008, aimed at tourists and investors, which he described as the harvest of two years' work. He announced a plan in May 2010 to double the emirate's hotel capacity within five years, to about 15,000 rooms. He also announced, in October 2010, that the authority would launch the Sharjah Light Festival in February 2011, and the festival, organised by the authority, opened that month. According to figures he gave in 2011, the emirate received about 1.5 million tourists in 2010, against 600,000 in 2001, and its hotel establishments grew from 40 to 107 over the same period. He also said the authority had an office in Berlin, that it had launched a tour-guide training scheme with Skyline College in 2009, and that about half of its staff were Emirati.

=== Cultural celebrations ===
He chaired the executive committee of the Sharjah Islamic Culture Capital 2014 celebration, after the Ruler of Sharjah formed the celebration's organising committee under his chairmanship in April 2013 and charged him with supervising all its activities. He also chaired the committee for the opening ceremony of Sharjah World Book Capital 2019, held in April that year.

== Media and communication ==
=== Institutions ===
The Sharjah Media Corporation was established in 2009 to oversee Sharjah TV and the emirate's radio stations. Sultan bin Ahmed was deputy chairman of its first board, which the Ruler chaired, from June 2009, and became its chairman in May 2010, when the corporation was reorganised. The corporation launched Holy Quran Radio from Sharjah (2012), two regional channels, Al Sharqiya from Kalba (2014) and Al Wusta from Al Dhaid (2016), and the English-language Pulse 95 Radio (2018). In January 2019 the corporation was replaced by the Sharjah Broadcasting Authority, to which all its rights, assets and obligations passed.

The Sharjah Media Centre, set up in 2011 within the corporation and headed by its chairman, became a separate body in 2012 that also took in the government communication unit, the Sharjah Press Club and the Ruler's media office. He was appointed the centre's chairman that October, and in 2017 it was renamed the Sharjah Government Media Bureau. In 2013, as the centre's chairman, he had headed Sharjah's delegation on a promotional tour of the United States organised by the Sharjah Investment and Development Authority (Shurooq), during which he met the UN Secretary-General, Ban Ki-moon. He said in 2013 that Emiratisation stood at about 50 per cent in the corporation and above 70 per cent in the centre.

Sultan bin Ahmed Al Qasimi during a meeting in the media sector

The Sharjah Media Council was set up on 13 February 2017 to draw up the emirate's media policy, and he was appointed its chairman the same day. At its creation the council comprised the Sharjah Media Corporation, the Sharjah Government Media Bureau and Sharjah Media City (Shams), and he has remained its chairman through its re-formations of 2017, 2021, 2023 and 2024. He directed government and semi-government bodies to unify their media messaging during the COVID-19 pandemic in March 2020, and approved the Sharjah Government media guidelines manual in March 2021. He also supervises media projects that include a unified government media complex, approved by the Ruler of Sharjah in November 2025. He was appointed to the board of the National Media Council in April 2018, as chairman of the Sharjah Media Council. Leading Sharjah's delegation to the Arab Media Forum in Kuwait that month, he spoke on the credibility of media content and on countering fake news. He attended the ceremony honouring the winners of the Shams Award for Arabic Content, organised by Sharjah Media City, in February 2025 and presented the awards to the winners, and honoured the winners of its second edition in January 2026.

The Sharjah Communication Technologies Authority was established on 13 June 2024, and he was appointed its chairman the same day. Its founding decree includes artificial intelligence among the communication technologies within its remit, and a communication technologies free zone in Kalba was attached to the authority in July 2024.

=== Government communication ===
The Sharjah Media Centre launched the International Government Communication Forum, first held in February 2012 and held annually in Sharjah since then. Sultan bin Ahmed announced the Sharjah Government Communication Award in September 2012, and it was first presented in December 2013. The Sharjah 24 news website was launched during the 2015 forum and the centre held the first Xposure International Photography Festival in October 2016. In March 2017 he announced the International Government Communication Centre, to be run by the Sharjah Government Media Bureau.

His opinion articles, published between 2015 and 2020 in The National, Al Khaleej and Gulf News, dealt with government communication, transparency and humanitarian work. In one of them, "What do we want from government communication?" (2020), he wrote that whoever commands the field of communication commands a superpower before which other powers are helpless: public opinion. He told Oxford Business Group in 2017 that each government entity had handled its own communication before the Sharjah Media Centre was formed in 2011.

== University of Sharjah ==
=== Presidency ===
Sultan bin Ahmed Al Qasimi speaking at a University of Sharjah ceremony

He was appointed president of the University of Sharjah and chairman of its board of trustees by Emiri decree on 6 December 2021. As president he approved the university's Emiratisation and employment policy (January 2023) and appointed Issam Al Din Ajami chancellor (May 2025). He reconstituted the board of trustees in May 2026, with members serving renewable three-year terms. He also directed in July 2025 that the country's top secondary-school graduates receive scholarships covering their full tuition in any of the university's accredited programmes, an initiative renewed in 2026. He opened the university's Innovation Centre, set up with the e& group, in July 2026.

=== Strategy, programmes and research ===
Sultan bin Ahmed Al Qasimi at a University of Sharjah ceremony

The board of trustees under his chairmanship approved the university's 2024–2030 strategic plan in June 2024 and an updated version in June 2026. He launched the plan in October 2024; among its stated aims is to place the university among the world's top 200 universities. The board's academic decisions included a College of Public Policy and a doctorate in public health (2023). It also converted the Bachelor of Medicine and Surgery into a Doctor of Medicine programme (2025) and approved a doctorate in leadership in higher education (2025). In artificial intelligence it approved the start of accreditation for a master's degree in mathematics for machine learning and artificial intelligence (2024) and the Sharjah Smart Center for Judicial and Legal Research, with the Judicial Council (2025). Its 2026 decisions added a bachelor's degree and a doctorate in AI, a master's degree in AI for biomedical applications and an AI applications centre. Its research centres include centres of excellence for therapeutic and translational medicine and for healthy ageing (2022), a centre of excellence for cancer (2024), the Exeter-Sharjah Centre for Global Studies (2025) and a robotics centre (2026). Speaking at the second Sharjah International Conference on Education in 2025, he called for artificial intelligence to be applied in education ethically and equitably. The company developing Egypt's New Administrative Capital announced in April 2026 an agreement under which it would allocate 100 feddans there to the university's first international branch; Sultan bin Ahmed represented the university in the negotiations.

== Activities in space and astronomy ==
Speaking on 6 July 2023 during a live call with the astronaut Sultan Al Neyadi, Sultan bin Ahmed said that he personally followed his activities, and that he observed the International Space Station as it passed over the UAE, watching it and often photographing it. In November 2022 he inspected the readiness of the CubeSat Sharjah-Sat-1 and on 3 January 2023 followed its launch by live broadcast from the Sharjah Academy for Astronomy, Space Sciences and Technology. On 30 March 2026 the Ruler of Sharjah issued a decree establishing the Sharjah Space and Astronomy Complex under the University of Sharjah, and that evening Sultan bin Ahmed launched its corporate identity, and followed by live broadcast the launch of the CubeSat Sharjah-Sat-2, the complex's second project in its CubeSat series.

== Judicial Council ==
=== Establishment and mandate ===
He has chaired the Sharjah Judicial Council since the Ruler created it on 23 October 2024 by Emiri Decree No. 70 of 2024, and was named chairman again when its members were re-appointed in 2025. Decree No. 70 made the council "the highest authority of the judicial system" in the emirate and gave it financial and administrative independence; decrees issued the same day created a Judicial Department and a Public Prosecution. Sharjah's courts had previously operated within the federal judicial system; the decrees began the emirate's move to a judiciary of its own, of the kind already found in Abu Dhabi, Dubai and Ras Al Khaimah. Law No. 7 of 2025 on the organisation of the judicial authority, in force from 1 June 2025, provides for the formation of the council and regulates its relationship with the Judicial Department, the Public Prosecution and the courts. It gives the council responsibility for judicial policy, proposals for legislation and the supervision of judicial bodies, and powers over the appointment, promotion and transfer of judges, the approval of the draft budget for submission to the Ruler, and the issuing of a code of judicial conduct. He said that implementing the law strengthened judicial independence and was a historic step towards a modern and transparent legal framework.

=== Reforms and digital systems ===
At its first meeting under his chairmanship, in November 2024, the council formed a committee to arrange a smooth transition without disrupting judicial services, and stressed raising Emiratisation and training staff. Its decisions in 2025 and 2026 approved the establishment of a family court, courts of appeal in Kalba and Al Dhaid, courts for estates and for enforcement, and a court and prosecution office for municipal and environmental affairs. It also approved the establishment of nine specialised prosecution offices, among them offices for public funds, for economic crimes and money laundering, and for family and children. The council approved a fund for urgent alimony payments and directed that a committee be formed to manage minors' funds. Its enforcement measures include electronic alternatives to detaining judgment debtors and a round-the-clock duty judge for urgent enforcement matters. In April 2026 it approved a package of six draft regulations, including a code of judicial conduct and a judicial inspection regulation, and it adopted Sharjah Judiciary, a single electronic platform for the council, the Judicial Department and the Public Prosecution. Its AI Governance Guide, adopted in October 2026, sets a framework for the controlled and secure use of artificial intelligence in judicial and administrative work, covering risk management, data protection and human oversight. Sultan bin Ahmed launched new digital judicial systems in January 2026, including an integrated electronic litigation system and two artificial-intelligence tools, a virtual legal translator and a virtual assistant named Tibyan. He also inaugurated a digital platform for rental disputes in April 2026, which allows virtual hearings and enforceable digital judgments. He has called lawyers and legal advisers key partners in strengthening the justice system.

== Business ==
=== Basma Group and other ventures ===
He has chaired Basma Group since 2005. As a member of the founders' committee of Dana Gas, he was involved with the company from its listing in 2005 and later served as a board member. He launched the Sharjah General Services Company (Khadamat) in October 2013 as a partnership with the transport-networks company of the Indian group IL&FS, to manage and operate facilities and develop road networks. He also chairs Tilal Properties, launched in 2014 by Sharjah Asset Management in partnership with Eskan Real Estate Development, and at its launch he announced Tilal City as its first project; he unveiled plans for Tilal Mall there in 2016. Speaking in 2018, he described Tilal as "a partnership with the government first of all" and said that Sharjah's law had been changed to allow non-UAE nationals to hold property on a leasehold basis.

=== Green Planet and Wekaya ===
He was chief executive of Green Planet, which with the Sharjah Environment Company (Bee'ah) formed the partnership Wekaya; the Sharjah government signed a medical-waste treatment agreement with Wekaya in July 2009. As Wekaya's chairman, he said at the opening of its plant in January 2011 that a second phase of the project would cover hazardous waste, and in 2023 he opened its subsidiary Salamatak.

=== Arada ===
The property developer Arada was announced in January 2017 as a joint venture between Basma Group and Prince Khaled bin Alwaleed bin Talal's KBW Investments, with Sultan bin Ahmed as chairman. Arada launched its first Sharjah project, Nasma Residences, in March 2017, and when its 24-billion-dirham Aljada project in Sharjah was unveiled that September, Sultan bin Ahmed said the founding partners were putting five billion dirhams into it. Arada launched its Masaar community in Sharjah in January 2021. Basma Group owned 40 per cent of Arada in 2022, and KBW Investments 60 per cent.

=== Invest Bank ===
Invest Bank's shareholders named him chairman of the board in April 2019, when they approved a strategic investment by the Sharjah government of 1.115 billion dirhams for a 50.07 per cent stake. He said the aim was to return the bank to profitable growth over the medium term. The bank reported a net profit of about 161 million dirhams for 2025, and in February 2026 he launched its new corporate identity.

== Humanitarian work ==
=== The Big Heart Foundation ===
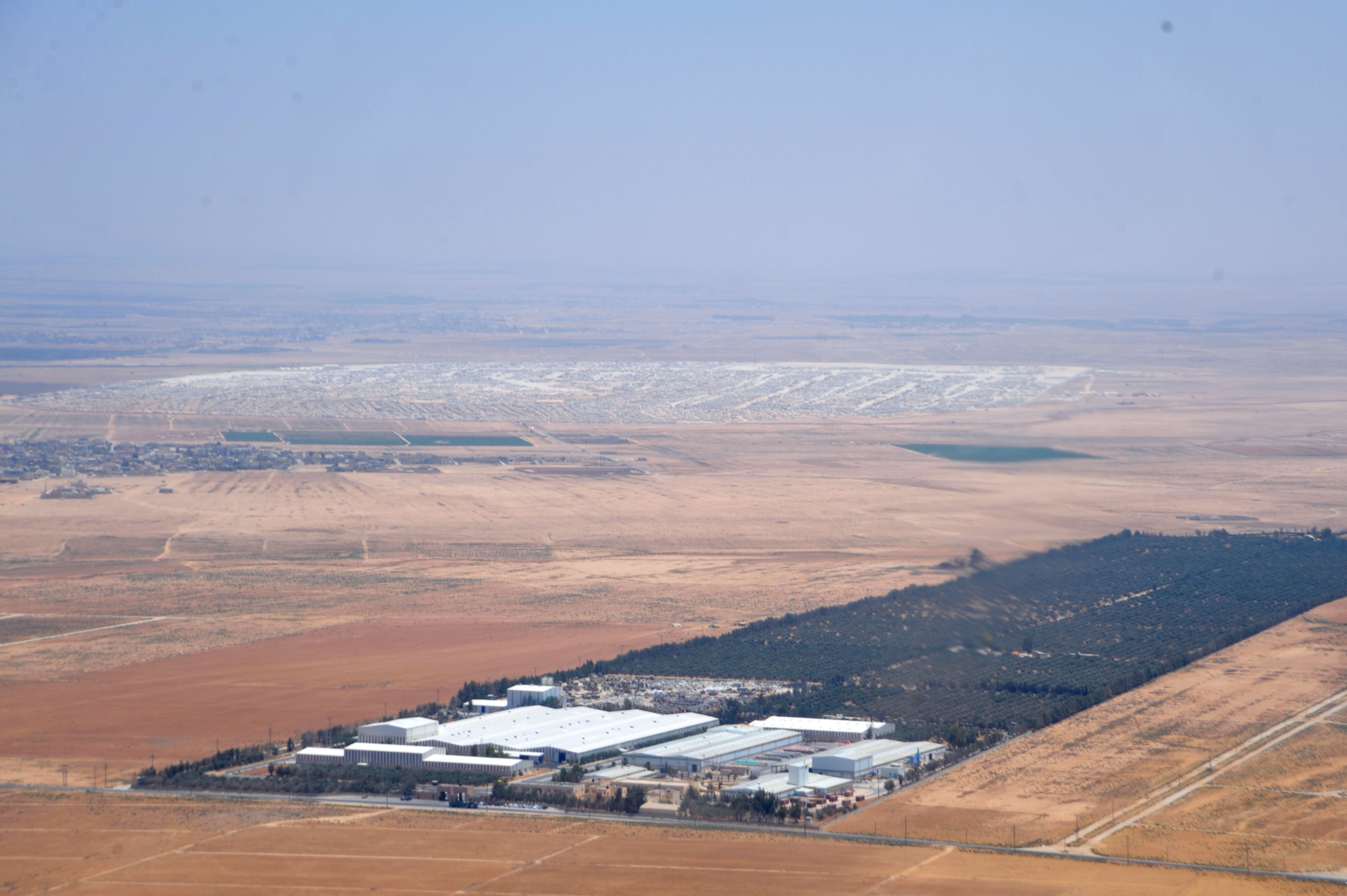
Zaatari refugee camp in Jordan, 2013

The Big Heart Foundation named him its humanitarian envoy in 2017, and its chairperson, Sheikha Jawaher bint Mohammed Al Qasimi, renewed his appointment for a second term in February 2020. In that role he led the foundation's delegation to the Kakuma refugee camp in Kenya in November 2019 to assess the challenges facing refugees there.

=== Health care ===
In health care, he announced in May 2017, as chairman of the Sharjah Media Corporation, the corporation's donation of three million dirhams to run the foundation's clinic in the Zaatari refugee camp in Jordan for a full year. He opened a 100-bed hospital for Rohingya refugees in the Kutupalong camp in Bangladesh in November 2018. It was financed by a donation of three million dirhams from the Sharjah Media Corporation to the Big Heart Foundation, which built it in collaboration with Médecins Sans Frontières; according to The National, the hospital is staffed by an MSF medical team. It was intended to serve about 140,000 refugees. He launched two treatment campaigns in 2024. The first, "Little Hearts" (July), was aimed at heart patients unable to afford treatment at the Magdi Yacoub centre in Aswan, Egypt, and was funded for a full year by the Sharjah Broadcasting Authority together with Sharjah Charity International. The second, "Small Hearts and Eyes" (September), was aimed at children in Bishkek, the capital of Kyrgyzstan; on a visit to the city's National Hospital he asked its specialists to speed up the supply of up-to-date medical equipment. Sharjah Charity International and another foundation supplied new equipment for the hospital's eye microsurgery department, installed in early 2026, according to Kyrgyzstan's Ministry of Health.

=== Education and schools ===
In education, he attended in Oxford in January 2018, as The Big Heart Foundation's humanitarian envoy and with Malala Yousafzai, the announcement of a US$700,000 grant from the foundation to build, with the Malala Fund, a school for 350 girls in Pakistan's Swat valley. He said the school would be a starting point for hundreds of young girls because education is their right, and described supporting the education of young people as a fundamental responsibility for the world. He also inaugurated the Big Heart Secondary School for Girls, a boarding school for 360 students in the Kalobeyei settlement in northern Kenya, during a field visit reported in early March 2023. He announced in September 2026 the establishment of the Jawaher Al Qasimi Humanitarian Innovation Centre at Gadjah Mada University in Indonesia, with funding of US$1.6 million made up of US$1 million from the Big Heart Foundation, US$500,000 from the NAMA Women Advancement Establishment and US$100,000 from the university.

=== Housing and shelter ===
In housing, he inaugurated at Kalobeyei the first-phase homes of the "A Home for Every Home" initiative, launched by Arada in partnership with The Big Heart Foundation and the United Nations High Commissioner for Refugees. He has also laid the foundation stones of projects of Al Reeh Al Mursala, a Ramadan charity programme presented by the Sharjah Broadcasting Authority in cooperation with Sharjah Charity International. They include a clinic and a drinking-water network in Oktyabr, Kyrgyzstan (2024), a 50-home village in Puttalam, Sri Lanka (2025), and a 60-home village in Dinas, on Mindanao in the Philippines (2026). On his visit to Puttalam he also inaugurated 40 homes for widows, orphans and their families at the Al Rahma Women's Village, which is supported by a collaboration between the Sharjah Media Council and Sharjah Charity International. In Dinas he opened the Dar Al Rahma Orphanage, a Qur'an and Arabic learning centre and the rehabilitated Dinas Health Clinic.

== Awards and honours ==
The Arab League honoured him as Most Prominent Media Personality of 2016 on 31 October 2016, during the fifth Cairo Mondial for Arts and Media, which its media and communication sector organises with the General Federation of Arab Producers. The Arab Media Forum honoured him at its 15th session, in Kuwait in April 2018, as the representative of Sharjah, the session's guest of honour, with a shield presented by Sheikh Sabah Al-Khalid Al-Sabah. Sheikha Jawaher bint Mohammed Al Qasimi, wife of the Ruler of Sharjah and chairperson of the Big Heart Foundation, for which he serves as humanitarian envoy, conferred the foundation's Jawaher Medal of Honour on him in June 2023 in recognition of his humanitarian leadership, including support for forcibly displaced people and host communities. The Royal European Academy of Doctors in Spain awarded him its Golden Medal of Honour in March 2025 for his contribution to higher education.

== Personal life ==
=== Marriage and children ===
He is married to Sheikha Bodour bint Sultan Al Qasimi, a daughter of the Ruler of Sharjah, Sultan bin Muhammad Al-Qasimi, and they have four children:

- Sheikha Mariam bint Sultan Al Qasimi
- Ahmed bin Sultan Al Qasimi
- Sheikha Alya bint Sultan Al Qasimi
- Sheikha Meera bint Sultan Al Qasimi

The marriage contract of his daughter Mariam to Ahmed bin Sultan bin Mohammed Al Qasimi, son of the Crown Prince of Sharjah, Sheikh Sultan bin Mohammed bin Sultan Al Qasimi, was concluded on 21 December 2024. The couple's wedding was held in September 2025.

=== Interests ===
His interests include travel and nature photography; a series of ten of his photographs of Sharjah's landmarks was exhibited at the Xposure International Photography Festival in 2023. He had said in two interviews in 2019 that he took night photographs, capturing the stars with special techniques and trying to follow their movement in his shots.
