= Sharjah National Oil Corporation =

Energy company in the Emirate of Sharjah, UAE

- Type: Government owned corporation
- Industry: Oil and Gas
- Predecessor: BP Sharjah, Shalco
- Founded: 2010; 16 years ago
- Headquarters: Sharjah, UAE
- Key people: Sultan bin Ahmed Al Qasimi (President); Khamis Al Mazrouei (CEO)
- Owner: Emirate of Sharjah
- Website: www.snoc.ae

SNOC (the Sharjah National Oil Corporation) is an Oil and Gas producer based in Sharjah, UAE. Established by Emiri decree in 2010, SNOC is a corporation wholly owned by the government of the Emirate of Sharjah.

SNOC is the operator of the Sajaa Assets located in Sharjah, UAE. The Sajaa Assets consist of four producing gas fields, a hydrocarbon processing complex, two marine terminals and a field used for subsurface gas storage.

== History ==
On 8 November 1978 a concession agreement was signed between the Emirate of Sharjah and the Amoco production company, allowing Amoco to explore for oil and gas across 600,000 acres (2,400 km^{2}) of onshore Sharjah.

On 10 May 1980, work started on the Sajaa-1 well which was drilled to a depth of 16,656 ft (5,077 m). The well-marked the discovery of the Sajaa field, which turned out to be one of the largest gas condensate fields in the UAE. In October 1981, the nearby 'Moveyeid' field was discovered. Construction of a gas processing plant at Al Sajaa was completed by June 1982 along with a condensate export terminal and offshore loading facility in Al Hamriyah. The first condensate cargo of 500,000 US bbl (60,000 m^{3}) was exported on 30 July 1982 on the oil tanker ‘Amoco Savanah’. In 1983 gas sales started to Sharjah Electricity and Water Authority (SEWA) and later to Dubai and the Northern Emirates.

On 23 March 1984, a construction agreement was signed between SHALCO (Sharjah LPG Company) and JGC to construct an LPG plant to recover secondary condensate plus propane and butane. An LPG terminal and associated export facilities were also constructed at Hamriyah (the first facility in what would later become Hamriyah port). The first load of LPG was exported from Hamriyah on 26 April 1986.

Additional exploration drilling discovered a third field ‘Kahaif’ in 1992 with production starting in 1994. A second phase of drilling operations at Sajaa added a further 26 production wells.

In 1999, BP assumed the operating role in Sharjah following a merger with Amoco.

In April 2003, BP Sharjah and Baker Oil Tools began deployment of coiled tubing at the Sajaa field. The campaign included the world’s first coiled tubing campaign to feature underbalanced casing exit using gas as the milling fluid. The use of this technology allowed uninterrupted gas production throughout the entire milling operation.

In November 2003, BP Sharjah announced that it had broken the world record for LPG recovery, achieving 99.75% recovery of propane and a near 100 percent recovery of butane and hydrocarbon condensate at the Sajaa Gas Plant.

In 2010, Sharjah Ruler HH DR. Sheikh Sultan Bin Mohammed Al Qasimi announced the establishment of the Sharjah National Oil Company (SNOC) according to an Emiri decree. As an interim measure, Petrofac was awarded a five-year duty holder contract by SNOC to operate and maintain the Sajaa Assets and to facilitate a smooth transition following the end of the original Amoco concession agreement. By the end of 2015, SNOC assumed full responsibility for the management and operations of the Sajaa Assets. Sultan bin Ahmed Al Qasimi has chaired the board of SNOC since his appointment by Emiri Decree No. 53 of 2010.

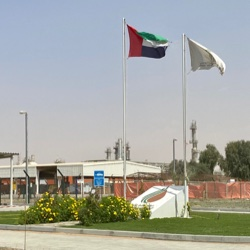
Entrance to the Sajaa gas plant's LPG road tanker loading facility

In January 2011, a field-wide compression project was implemented, which included the installation of twelve gas engine driven reciprocating compressors to maximize production at low field pressures.

In 2017, SNOC converted the Moveyeid field into a gas storage facility. Injection into the Moveyeid field began in December 2017 using centrifugal compressors. In 2020, a second stage of compression was added, using reciprocating compressors in series with the original centrifugal machines. The second stage of compression was commissioned on 6 January 2021 allowing SNOC to increase injection pressures to the Moveyeid field.

In June 2018, SNOC expanded the Sajaa plant with the addition of an LPG road tanker loading facility.

In 2019, SNOC commissioned two small solar plants at their facilities in Hamriyyah. The projects demonstrated the potential for integrating solar power plants into existing brownfield hydrocarbon facilities and are expected to reduce the corporation’s carbon footprint by 8,600 tonnes over 25 years.

In January 2019, SNOC signed a concession agreement with Eni for the exploration of three onshore areas in Sharjah. In January 2020, SNOC and Eni announced a new discovery of natural gas and condensate at the Mahani field in Sharjah. Production from the first well (Mahani-1) started on 4 January 2021, less than a year after the discovery was first announced.

In July 2023, SNOC signed an agreement with the Sumitomo Corporation to study carbon capture and storage opportunities in the Emirate of Sharjah.

In May 2024, SNOC announced the discovery of gas reserves at the Hedebah field to the north of the Al Sajaa Industrial Area in Sharjah.

SNOC acquired a 30% participation stake from Eni for Block 7 in the Emirate of Ras Al Khaimah, in May 2024.

On 17 April 2025, Sharjah Ruler HH DR. Sheikh Sultan Bin Mohammed Al Qasimi appointed Khamis Abdullah Al Mazrouei to the position of CEO of SNOC.

In June 2025, the Sharjah National Oil Corporation (SNOC), in partnership with Emerge (a joint venture between Masdar and EDF Renewables) commissioned the 60 MW "SANA" solar power plant at SNOC’s main hydrocarbon processing complex in the Al Sajaa industrial area. Over the course of a full year, the solar plant generates more electricity than the Sajaa facility consumes, with surplus energy supplied to the Sharjah Electricity and Water Authority.

== Operations ==
SNOC’s operations are all located in the Emirate of Sharjah and include:

- The Sajaa, Kahaif, Mahani and Hedebah onshore gas and condensate fields
- The Moveyeid field, used for gas storage since 2017
- The Sajaa gas, LPG, and hydrocarbon-condensate processing complex, which also acts as a hub for gas pipelines connecting the Northern Emirates
- A dedicated facility for LPG road tanker loading attached to the Sajaa processing complex
- An LPG liquid storage facility, with a marine terminal, located inside the Hamriyah Free Zone
- A hydrocarbon condensate storage terminal at Al Hamriyah with associated offshore loading facilities
- A 60 MW solar power plant in Al Sajaa, along with two smaller solar plants at the corporation's facilities in Hamriyyah.

== See also ==
- Abu Dhabi National Oil Company (ADNOC)
- Eni
