= Sultan bin Mohammed bin Sultan Al Qasimi =

Crown Prince and Deputy Ruler of Sharjah since 1999

Sheikh Sultan bin Mohammed bin Sultan Al Qasimi
- سلطان بن محمد بن سلطان القاسمي

Crown Prince of the Emirate of Sharjah
- Incumbent
- Assumed office 11 May 1999
- Monarch: Sultan bin Muhammad Al-Qasimi

Deputy Ruler of Sharjah
- Incumbent
- Assumed office 1999

Chairman of the Sharjah Executive Council

Chairman of the Sharjah Energy Council
- Incumbent
- Assumed office October 2024

Personal details
- Spouse: Azza bint Saud bin Sultan Al Qasimi
- Children: Mohammed; Saud; Ahmed; Salim; Meera
- Parents: Muhammad bin Sultan Al Qasimi (father); Meera bint Ahmed bin Rashid Al Mualla (mother)
- Relatives: Al Qasimi (family); Ahmed; Salim; Jawaher; Jamila; Sawsan; Fatima (siblings); Sultan bin Muhammad Al-Qasimi (brother-in-law)

Sheikh Sultan bin Mohammed bin Sultan Al Qasimi (Arabic: سلطان بن محمد بن سلطان القاسمي) is the Crown Prince and Deputy Ruler of the Emirate of Sharjah in the United Arab Emirates, posts he has held since 1999, chairman of the Sharjah Executive Council, and chairman of the emirate's Energy Council since 2024. He is a member of the ruling Al Qasimi family. He is the son of Sheikh Muhammad bin Sultan Al Qasimi, minister of public works in the UAE's first federal cabinet (1971), and a grandson of Sheikh Sultan bin Saqr Al Qasimi II, Ruler of Sharjah from 1924 to 1951.

== Crown Prince and Deputy Ruler ==
On 11 May 1999 (25 Muharram 1420 AH) the Ruler of Sharjah, Sheikh Sultan bin Muhammad Al-Qasimi, issued an Emiri decree appointing him Crown Prince of the emirate with the style "His Highness the Crown Prince", and he has since been described as Crown Prince and Deputy Ruler. He chairs the Sharjah Executive Council and in that capacity follows up the implementation of major development projects in the emirate.

== Other positions ==
In October 2024 the Ruler of Sharjah issued an Emiri decree forming the emirate's Energy Council under his chairmanship, with the head of the Sharjah Petroleum Department, Sheikh Sultan bin Ahmed Al Qasimi, his deputy Sheikh Mohammed bin Ahmed Al Qasimi, the chairman of the Sharjah Electricity, Water and Gas Authority and the director-general of the Central Finance Department as members, for a renewable four-year term. He chairs the board of the Sharjah Police Science Academy and previously chaired the board of directors of Sharjah Islamic Bank for about eighteen years.

== Personal life ==
His mother is Sheikha Meera bint Ahmed bin Rashid Al Mualla; his brothers are Ahmed and Salim, and his sisters are Jawaher, the wife of the Ruler of Sharjah, Jamila, Sawsan and Fatima. He is married to Sheikha Azza bint Saud bin Sultan Al Qasimi, and they have four sons, Mohammed, Saud, Ahmed and Salim, and a daughter, Meera. On 21 December 2024 the marriage contract of his son Sheikh Ahmed to Sheikha Mariam bint Sultan bin Ahmed Al Qasimi, daughter of the Deputy Ruler of Sharjah, was concluded in the presence of the Ruler of Sharjah, and the wedding was held in September 2025.

His son, Sheikh Ahmed, married Sheikha Mariam, daughter of Sheikh Sultan bin Ahmed Al Qasimi, Deputy Ruler of Sharjah; the marriage contract was concluded in December 2024 and the Crown Prince hosted the wedding reception on 18 September 2025.
