= Sultan bin Muhammad Al-Qasimi =

11th Ruler of the Emirate of Sharjah

Sultan bin Muhammad Al Qasimi
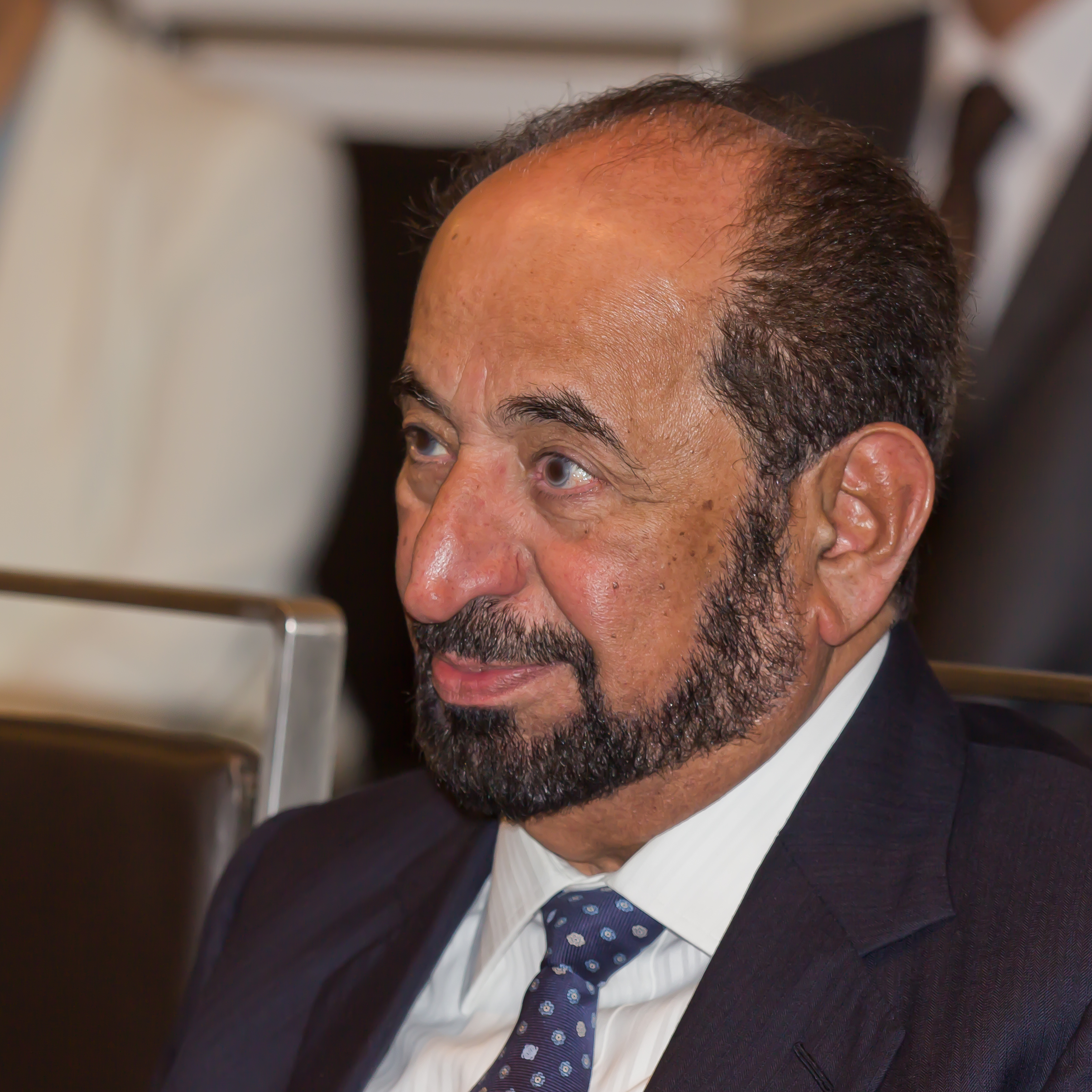
- Sheikh Sultan in 2014

Ruler of Sharjah
- Reign: 25 January 1972 – present
- Predecessor: Khalid bin Mohammed Al Qasimi
- Heir presumptive: Sultan bin Mohammed bin Sultan Al Qasimi

United Arab Emirates Minister of Education
- In office 9 December 1971 – 19 February 1972
- President: Zayed bin Sultan Al Nahyan
- Prime Minister: Maktoum Bin Rashid Al Maktoum
- Preceded by: Position established
- Succeeded by: Abdullah bin Omran Al Taryam
- Born: 2 July 1939 (age 87); Sharjah, Trucial States
- Spouse: Jawaher bint Mohammed Al-Qasimi
- Issue: Azza bint Sultan; Mohammed bin Sultan; Bodour bint Sultan; Noor bint Sultan; Hoor bint Sultan; Khalid bin Sultan
- House: Al Qasimi
- Father: Mohammed bin Saqr bin Khalid Al Qasimi
- Mother: Maryam bint Ghanem bin Salem Al Shamsi

Sheikh Sultan bin Muhammad Al-Qasimi (Arabic: سلطان بن محمد القاسمي, romanized: Sulṭān bin Muḥammad al-Qāsimī; born 2 July 1939) is an Emirati politician, author, historian, and the current and 11th ruler of the Emirate of Sharjah and a member of the Federal Supreme Council of the United Arab Emirates since January 1972. He is best known for his historical publications, support for education, and preservation of cultural landmarks. He restored the Al Hisn Fort in Sharjah in 1970 and served as the United Arab Emirates first Minister of Education in 1971. As an academic, he has authored multiple historical documents as well as memoirs, studies, novels, poetry and plays regarding the Middle East and North Africa.

== Early life and education ==
Sultan's mother was Maryam bint Sheikh Ghanem Al Shamsi (1915–2010). He has four brothers and two sisters: Khalid, Sheikh Saqr, Abdul Aziz, Abdullah, Sheikha and Naema.

In 1948, at the age of nine years, he enrolled in Eslah As Qasimia School. After completing his elementary and secondary education between Sharjah, Kuwait City and Dubai, Al-Qasimi went on to study a Bachelor of Science in Agricultural Engineering at Cairo University, graduating in 1971. He completed a PhD in history at the University of Exeter in 1985, and another in the political geography of the Gulf at Durham University in 1999.

== Career ==
=== Minister of Education ===
In December 1971, Sultan was appointed the first Minister of Education for the Emirates.

=== Academia ===
Al Qasimi became president of both the American University of Sharjah and the University of Sharjah in 1997 and was named a visiting professor at the University of Exeter, his alma mater, in 1998. He became a professor of modern history of the Gulf at the University of Sharjah in 1999. In 2008, he became a visiting professor at Cairo University.

=== Ruler of Sharjah ===
Sheikh Dr. Sultan bin Mohammed Al Qasimi became Ruler of Sharjah on 25 January 1972 and a member of the Supreme Council of the United Arab Emirates on the same day. He was 32 at the time. He is the 18th Ruler of Sharjah in the succession of Al Qasimi rulers, whose rule in the region dates back to the early 17th century. Since his accession, Sharjah has undergone significant cultural, economic and social development.

In June 17 1987, his brother Abd al-Aziz bin Muhammad al-Qassimi attempted a coup against him.

In May 2018, Al Qasimi established the "Irada" drug addiction treatment and rehabilitation centre in Sharjah.

Sultan celebrated the 50th anniversary as the Ruler of Sharjah on 25 January 2022.

=== Writing career ===
Al Qasimi has authored at least 82 books by 2023 which include historical, literary, and theatrical books.

In 2020, a historical film titled Khorfakkan based on the book Khorfakkan’s Resistance Against the Portuguese Invasion of September 1507 written by Al Qasimi was released. The movie tells the story of the resistance of Khorfakkan city against the Portuguese invasion in the 16th century.

== Philanthropy ==
=== University of Exeter ===
Sheikh Dr. Sultan bin Mohammed Al Qasimi has supported universities and research institutions in several countries, including the University of Exeter in the United Kingdom, where his contributions have helped develop academic programmes, research initiatives and university facilities.

=== Haghartsin Monastery ===
In 2011, Al-Qasimi donated to the non-profit Armenia Fund for the purpose of renovating the Haghartsin Monastery in Dilijan, Armenia.

== Honours and awards ==
=== Honours ===
Styles of Sultan bin Muhammad Al-Qasimi
- Reference style: His Highness
- Spoken style: Your Highness

==== National honour ====
- United Arab Emirates: Grand Cross with Collar of the Order of Zayed

==== Foreign honours ====
- Armenia: Grand Cross of the Order of Honour
- Belgium: Knight Grand Cordon of the Order of Leopold
- Egypt: Grand Cross with Collar of the Order of the Republic
- France:
  - Commander of the Order of Arts and Letters
  - Commander of the Legion of Honour
- Germany: Great Cross with Star of the Order of Merit of the Federal Republic of Germany
- Senegal: Grand Cross of the Order of Merit
- Sudan: Sash of Honour
- Portugal: Grand Collar of the Order of Camões

=== Honorary degrees ===
Al Qasimi has been awarded multiple honorary degrees from various institutions for his work in promoting education in social studies, law, science, and arts.

Degrees
Country	Date	University	Degree
Pakistan	1983	Faisalabad University	Doctorate in Science (DSc) honoris causa
Sudan	1986	Khartoum University	Doctor of Law honoris causa
Sudan	2020	Sudan University of Science and Technology	PhD in Drama honoris causa
United Kingdom	1993	University of Exeter	Doctorate in Arabic and Islamic studies honoris causa
United Kingdom	2001	University of Edinburgh	Doctorate in Humane Letters honoris causa
United Kingdom	2003	South Bank University	Doctor of Law honoris causa
United Kingdom	2008	University of Sheffield	Doctor of Arts (D.A) honoris causa
Russia	1995	Russian Academy of Sciences	Doctor of History honoris causa
Malaysia	2001	International Islamic University of Malaysia	Doctor of Philosophy and Doctor of Education honoris causa
Canada	2004	McMaster University	Doctor of Law honoris causa
Armenia	2005	Armenian National Academy of Sciences	honoris causa
Germany	2006	University of Tübingen	Doctor of Philosophy honoris causa
Jordan	2008	University of Jordan	Doctor of Public Administration honoris causa
Egypt	2009	Cairo University	Doctorate in Humane Letters honoris causa
Egypt	2015	American University in Cairo	Doctor of Social Science honoris causa
Japan	2010	Kanazawa University	Honorary Doctorate honoris causa
South Korea	2011	Hanyang University	Doctor of Social Science honoris causa
France	2012	Paris Diderot University	Doctorate in Humane Letters honoris causa
India	2017	University of Calicut	Doctorate in Education and Cultural Relations honoris causa
Portugal	2018	University of Coimbra	honoris causa
Italy	2019	Polytechnic University of Turin	Doctorate in Urban and Regional Development honoris causa
Spain	2019	Autonomous University of Madrid	honoris causa

== Personal life ==
Al Qasimi has had at least two wives. With his first wife, Al Qasimi had two children:

- Azza bint Sultan Al-Qasimi
- Mohammed bin Sultan Al Qasimi (1974-1999) served as Crown Prince of Sharjah. He passed away in the United Kingdom on 3 April 1999 at the age of 24.

With his second wife, Jawaher bint Mohammed Al Qasimi, he had four children:

- Bodour bint Sultan (b. 1978). She is married to Sultan bin Ahmed Al Qasimi and has three children:
  - Maryam bint Sultan Al Qasimi
  - Ahmed bin Sultan Al Qasimi
  - Alya bint Sultan Al Qasimi
- Noor bint Sultan (b. 1979)
- Hoor bint Sultan (b. 1980)
- Khalid bin Sultan Al Qasimi (1980–2019) was an Emirati fashion designer and founder of the Qasimi fashion label. He passed away in London on 1 July 2019 at the age of 39.
