= Kshisha Park =

Park in Sharjah, United Arab Emirates

Coordinates: 25°20′35″N 55°35′36″E

- Interactive map of Kshisha Park
- Type: Municipal
- Location: Sharjah
- Operator: Sharjah Municipality: Sharjah Public Parks

Kshisha Park is a recreational park in Al Rahmaniyah suburb, Sharjah, the United Arab Emirates. It was opened in March 2021.

== Facilities ==
Kshisha Park hosts football and volleyball court and a paddle court, a library, amphitheater, fitness hub, jogging and cycling tracks, playgrounds, skateboard range, and halls for holding workshops. It houses an artificial pond with a duck feeding station.

== Gallery ==
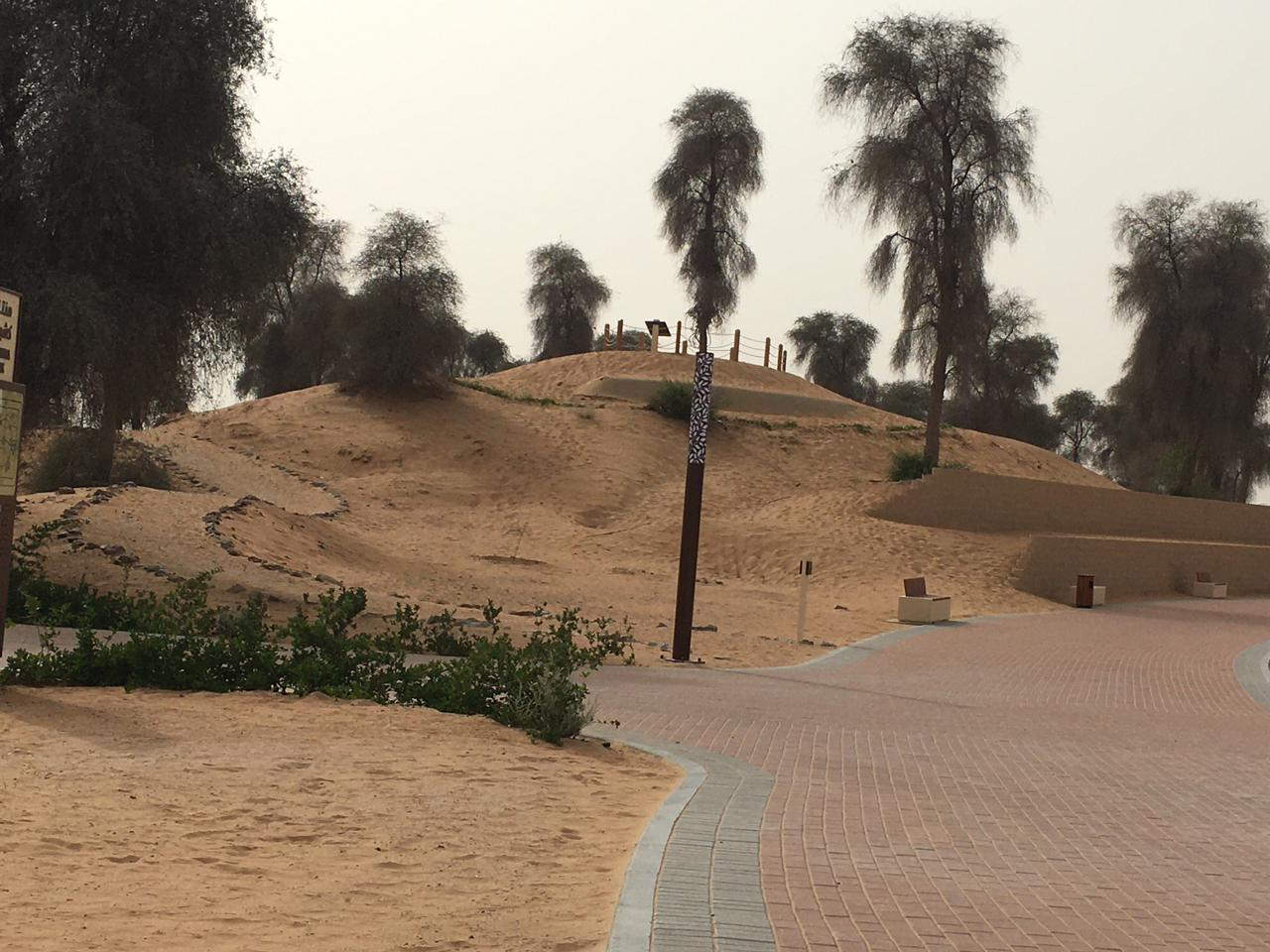
Hiking Trail Peak

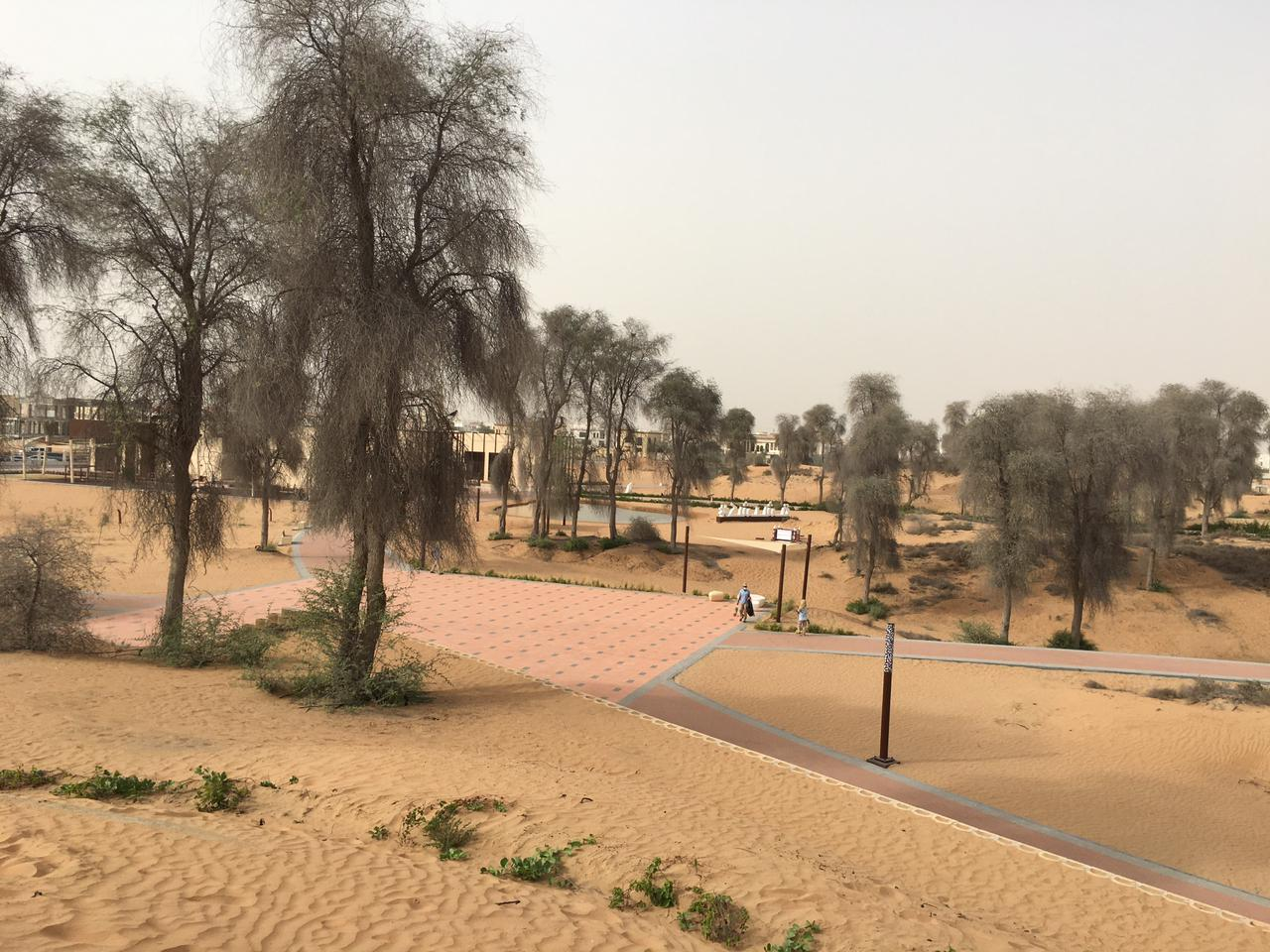
Entrance of the Park

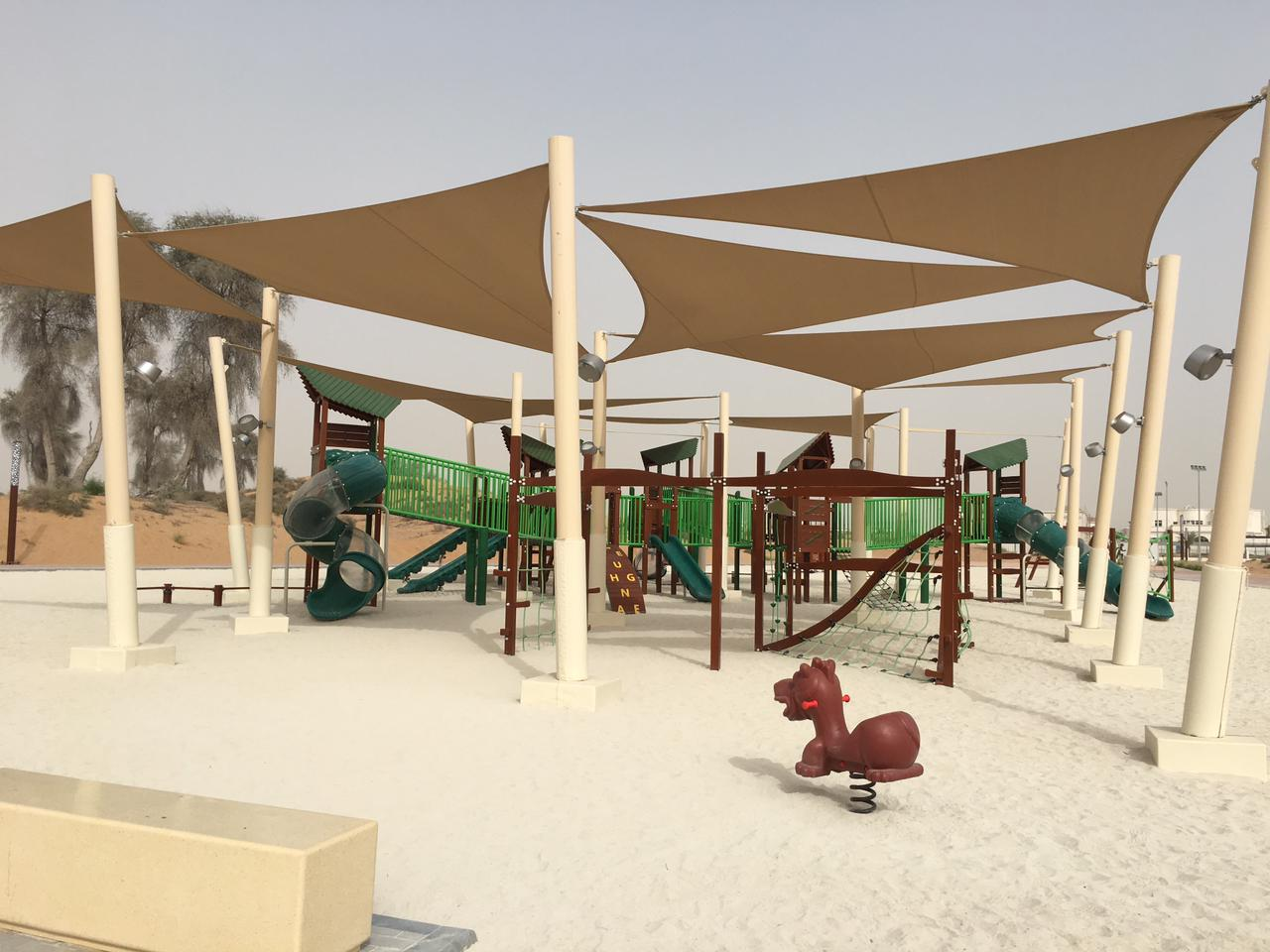
Play area

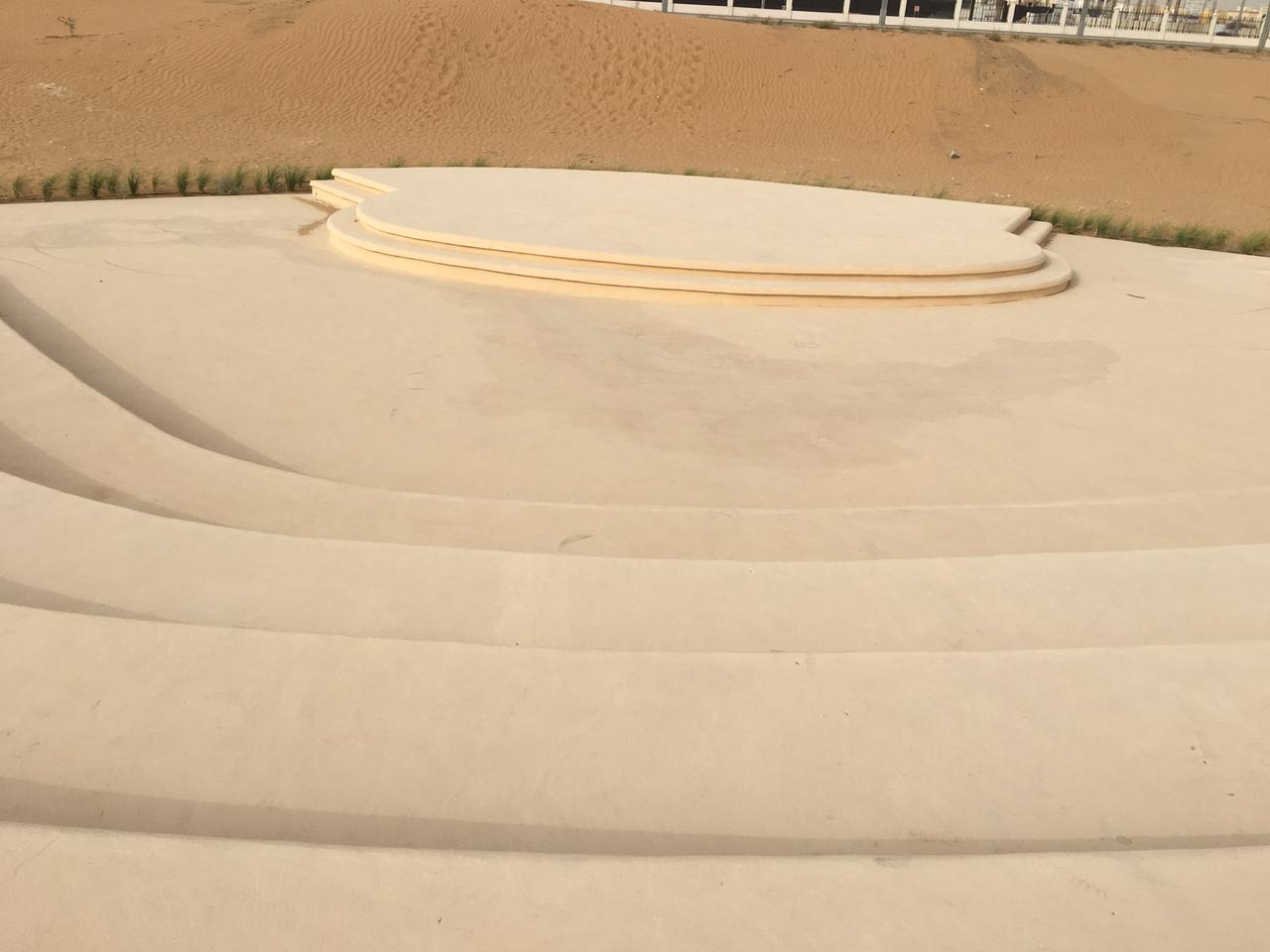
Amphitheater

== See also ==
- Sharjah National Park
- Shees Park
- Jebel Hafeet National Park, Abu Dhabi
- Mangrove National Park, Abu Dhabi
