= Sharjah =

Capital of the Emirate of Sharjah, United Arab Emirates

Sharjah ٱلشَّارقَة
- Metropolis
- Sharjah
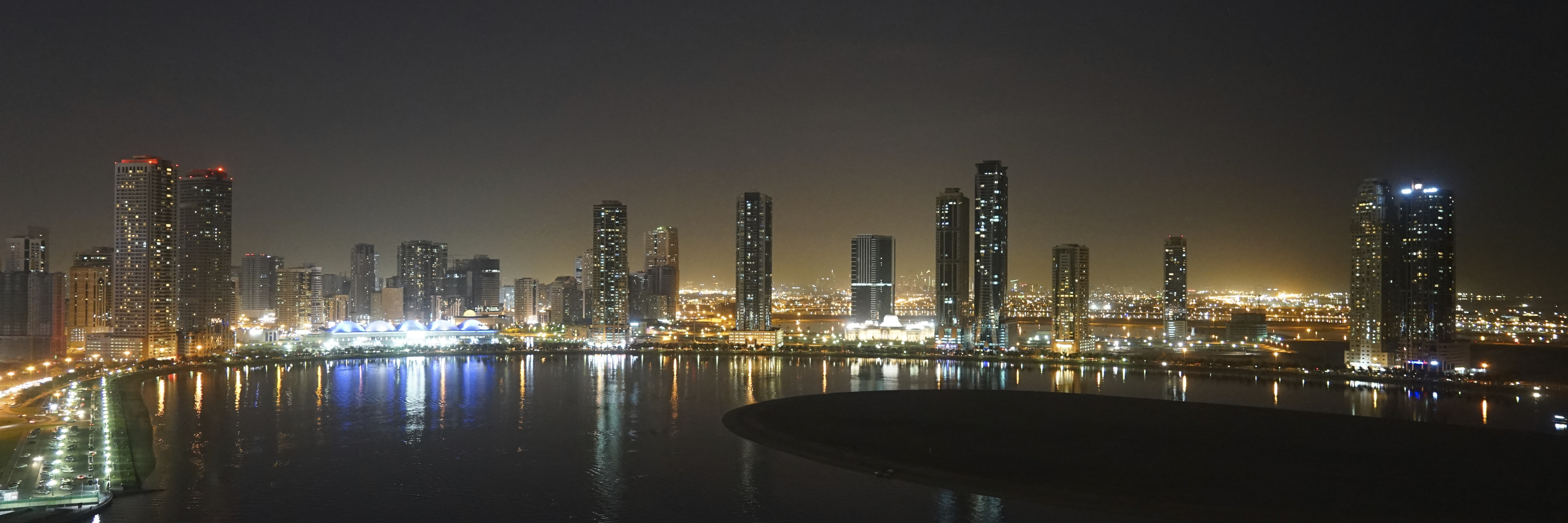
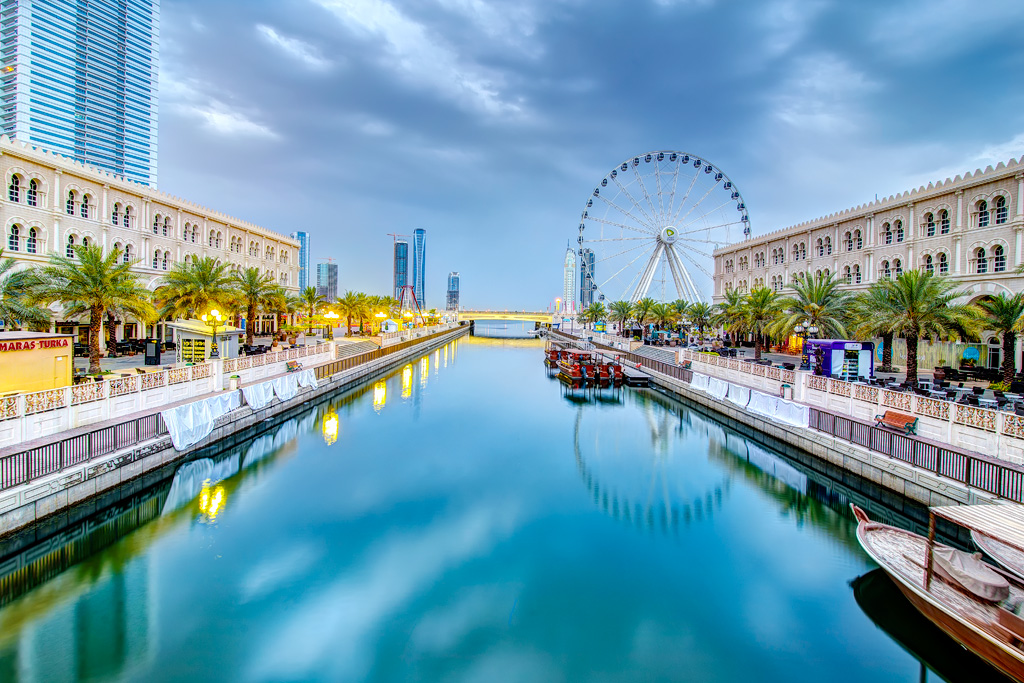
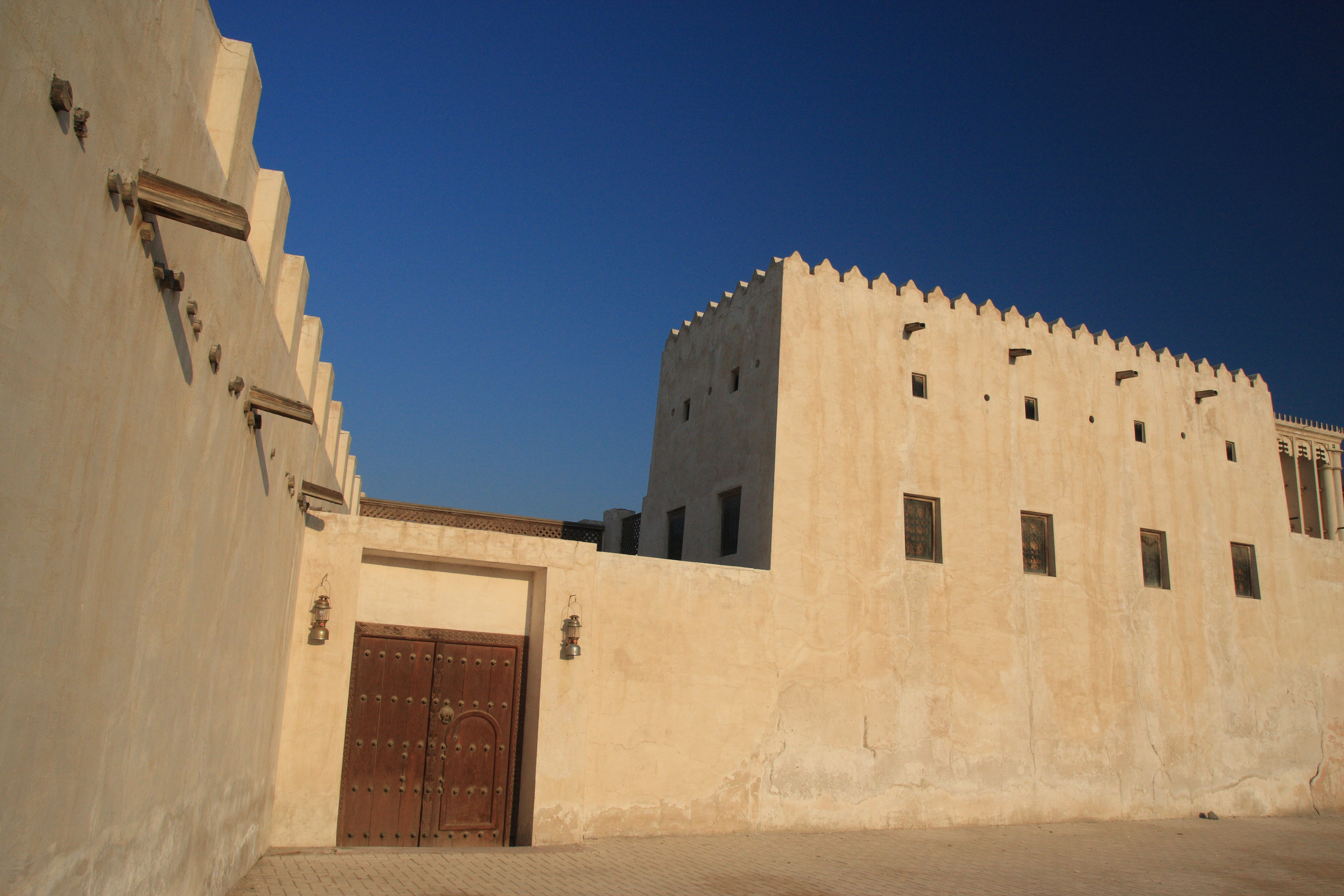
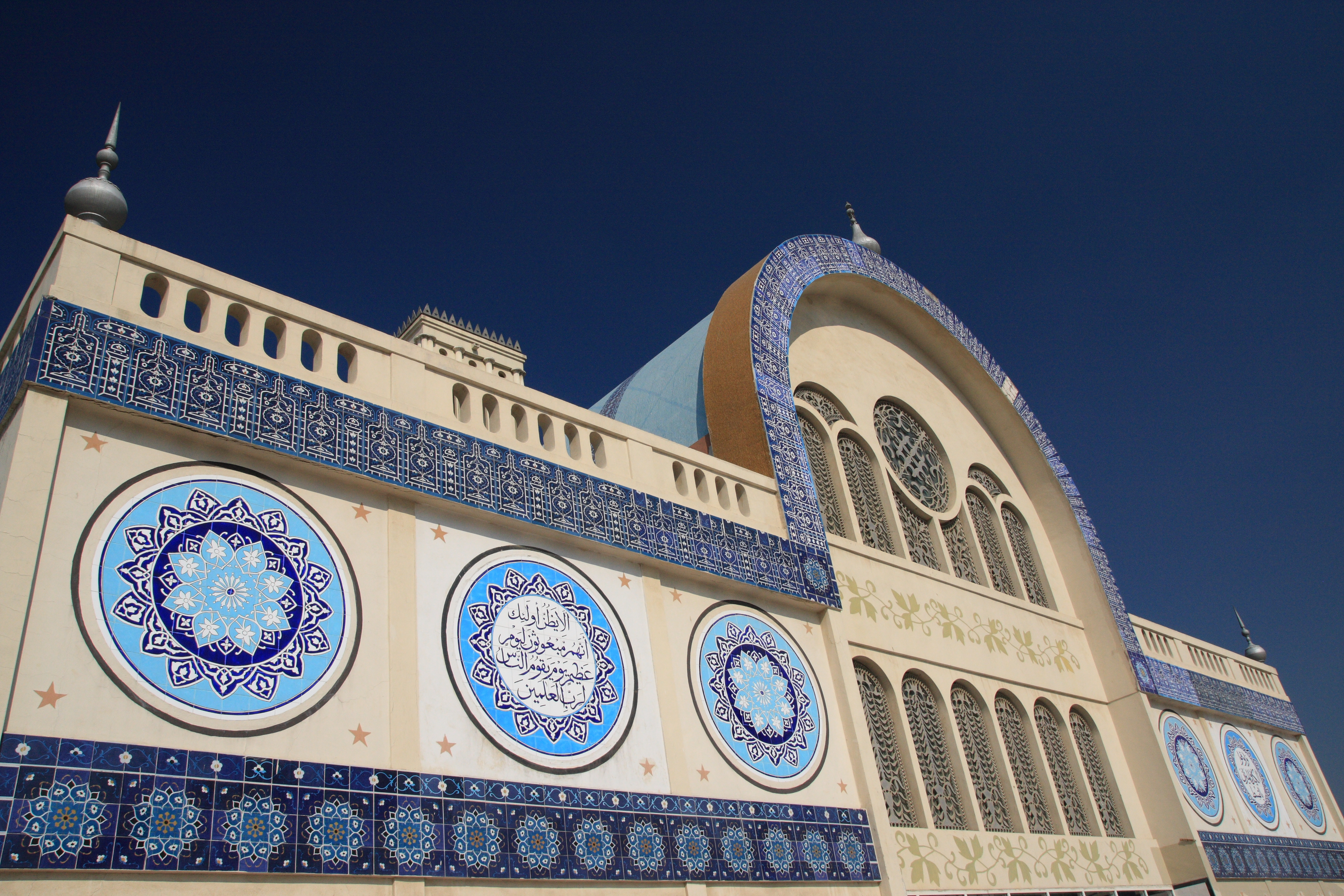
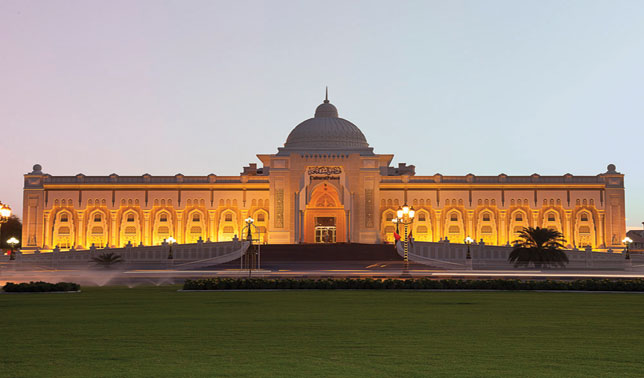
- Clockwise from top: Al Khan Lagoon, Heritage District, Al-Noor Mosque, Cultural Palace, Blue Souk, Al-Qasba Canal

- Flag Coat of arms
- Interactive map of Sharjah
- Location of Sharjah in the UAE Location within the Persian Gulf
- Coordinates: 25°21′27″N 55°23′27″E
- Country: United Arab Emirates
- Emirate: Sharjah

Government
  - Type: Absolute monarchy
  - Sheikh: Sultan bin Muhammad Al-Qasimi

Area
  - Total: 235.5 km^{2} (90.9 sq mi)

Population (2024)
  - Total: 1,872,000
  - Rank: 3rd
  - Density: 7,949/km^{2} (20,590/sq mi)

GDP
  - Total: US$ 58.9 billion (2023)
  - Per capita: US$ 32,100 (2023)

Sharjah (/ˈʃɑːrdʒə/; Arabic: ٱلشَّارقَة aš-Šāriqah, Gulf Arabic: aš-Šārja) is a major port city and the third-most populous city in the United Arab Emirates, after Dubai and Abu Dhabi. It is the capital of the Emirate of Sharjah and forms part of the Dubai-Sharjah-Ajman metropolitan area. The emirate shares legal, political, military and economic functions with the other emirates of the UAE within a federal framework. Each emirate has jurisdiction over some functions such as civil law enforcement and provision and upkeep of local facilities. Sharjah has been ruled by the Al Qasimi dynasty since the 18th century.

The city is a center for culture and industry, and alone contributes 7.4% of the GDP of the United Arab Emirates. The city covers approximately 235 km^{2} and has a population of over 1,800,000 (2022–2023). Sharjah has been officially named as a WHO healthy city. The 2025 edition of QS Best Student Cities ranked Sharjah as the 76th best city in the world to be a university student. Sharjah is regarded as the cultural capital of the UAE, and was the Islamic culture capital of 2014 and Sharjah World Book Capital for 2019 by UNESCO.

On 1 January 2022, Sharjah made history when its public sector adopted a four-day working week and a three-day weekend, becoming the first government sector in the Gulf region and the entire Middle East to fully adopt a four-day working week.

== Etymology ==
The origin of the name of Sharjah is unknown, with most common interpretations linking the origin of the word Sharjah to the word sharq (Arabic: شَرْق, lit. 'east') due to the fact that the city is located to the east of Dubai and Abu Dhabi, and that Sharjah was the easternmost settlement at the time.

However, other interpretations have disputed the origin of the name based on location, and suggested instead that it refers to the word shurūq (Arabic: شُروق, lit. 'sunrise'). Further theories have linked the name to a pre-Islamic idol called Abed Al Shareq that transformed into Sharjah. The origin of the word has also been linked to the Andalusi Arabic usage of the word, which was used to refer to a fort.

== History ==
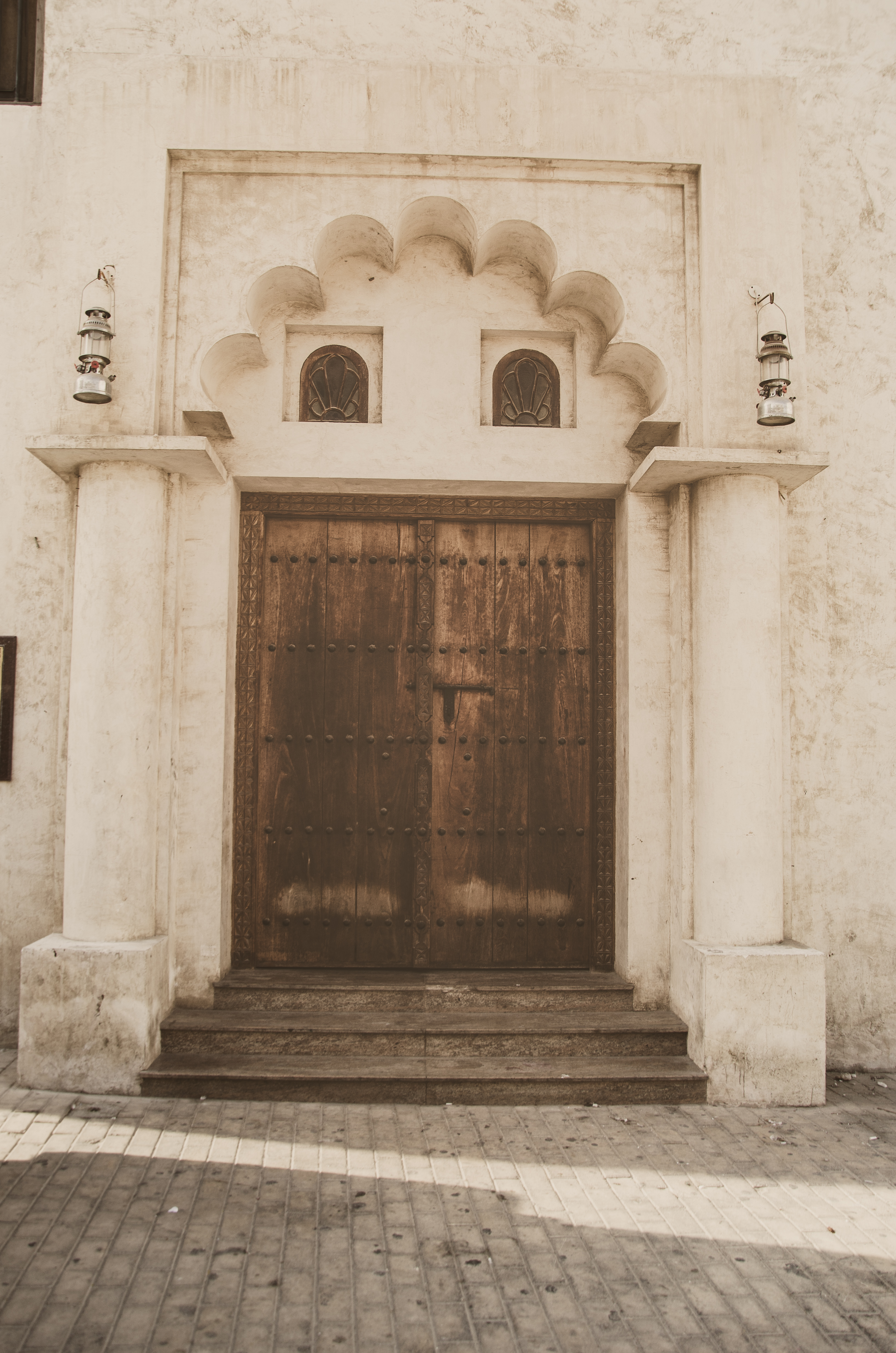
An old door in Sharjah, displaying the historical architecture of the city.

Sharjah was historically one of the wealthiest towns in this region with a settlement in existence for over 5000 years. In the early 18th century, the Huwayla tribe of the Qawasim clan established itself in Sharjah c. 1727, declaring Sharjah independent. On 8 January 1820, Sheikh Sultan I signed the General Maritime Treaty with Britain, accepting a protectorate to keep the Ottoman Turks out. Like its neighbors Ajman, Dubai, Ras Al Khaimah, and Umm Al Quwain, Sharjah's position on the route to India made it important enough to be recognized as a salute state (be it of the lowest class: 3 guns).

In 1829, English author and traveler James Silk Buckingham described Sharjah as such:

"In the course of the night, we had passed the port of Sharjee, on the Arabian coast, which is not an island, Niebuhr's chart, the only one in which it is inserted; but a small town, on a sandy beach, containing from five to six hundred inhabitants. It is situated in lat. 25° 34' north, and lies eleven leagues south-west of a small island, close to the shore, called Jeziret-el-Hamra; and three leagues south-west of Sharjee is Aboo Hayle."

With the approach of the 20th century, Sharjah extended inland to the area now known as Wasit Suburb, the area between the city and Al Dhaid being under the control of the tribes of the interior. With a population of 15,000 inhabitants, Sharjah had some four or five shops in Layyah and a bazaar of around 200 shops in main Sharjah.

In the midst of World War II, Nazi propaganda infiltrated the town. Loud propagating of pro-Hitler speeches could be heard emanating from the Sheikh of Sharjah's palace during a period in 1940, and messages sharing a similar sentiment graffitied on walls in the town center according to British intelligence reports at the time, for the messages being propagated by the Germans was one of anti-imperialism, it found a sympathetic audience among some of the emirate's populace, particularly Abdullah bin Faris, a secretary of the Sheikh who was responsible for the broadcasts. After the Sheikh was confronted by the British, he wrote a letter reaffirming his support for the British war efforts and disputed the charges laid out against bin Faris. Attached to the letter was a petition signed by 48 prominent individuals testifying to bin Faris' character, which, according to the British, had been misrepresented to the signees. The incident resolved after the Sheikh and bin Faris ceased transmitting propaganda and doubled down on their support to the British.

On 2 December 1971, Sharjah, together with Abu Dhabi, Dubai, Ajman, Umm Al Qawain, and Fujairah joined in the Act of Union to form the United Arab Emirates. The seventh emirate, Ras al-Khaimah, joined the UAE on 10 February 1972 following Iran's annexation of Ras al-Khaimah's Tunbs islands.

Like the other former Trucial States, Sharjah's name is known by many stamp collectors because of the large numbers of stamps that were issued by the Sharjah Post Office shortly before the formation of the United Arab Emirates. These stamps that were printed in profusion became worthless to collectors and came to be known as Dunes. Many of the items featured on these stamps were unrelated to the emirate and therefore many catalogues do not list them.

== Districts and landmarks ==
Sharjah City in the Northwest of the Emirate

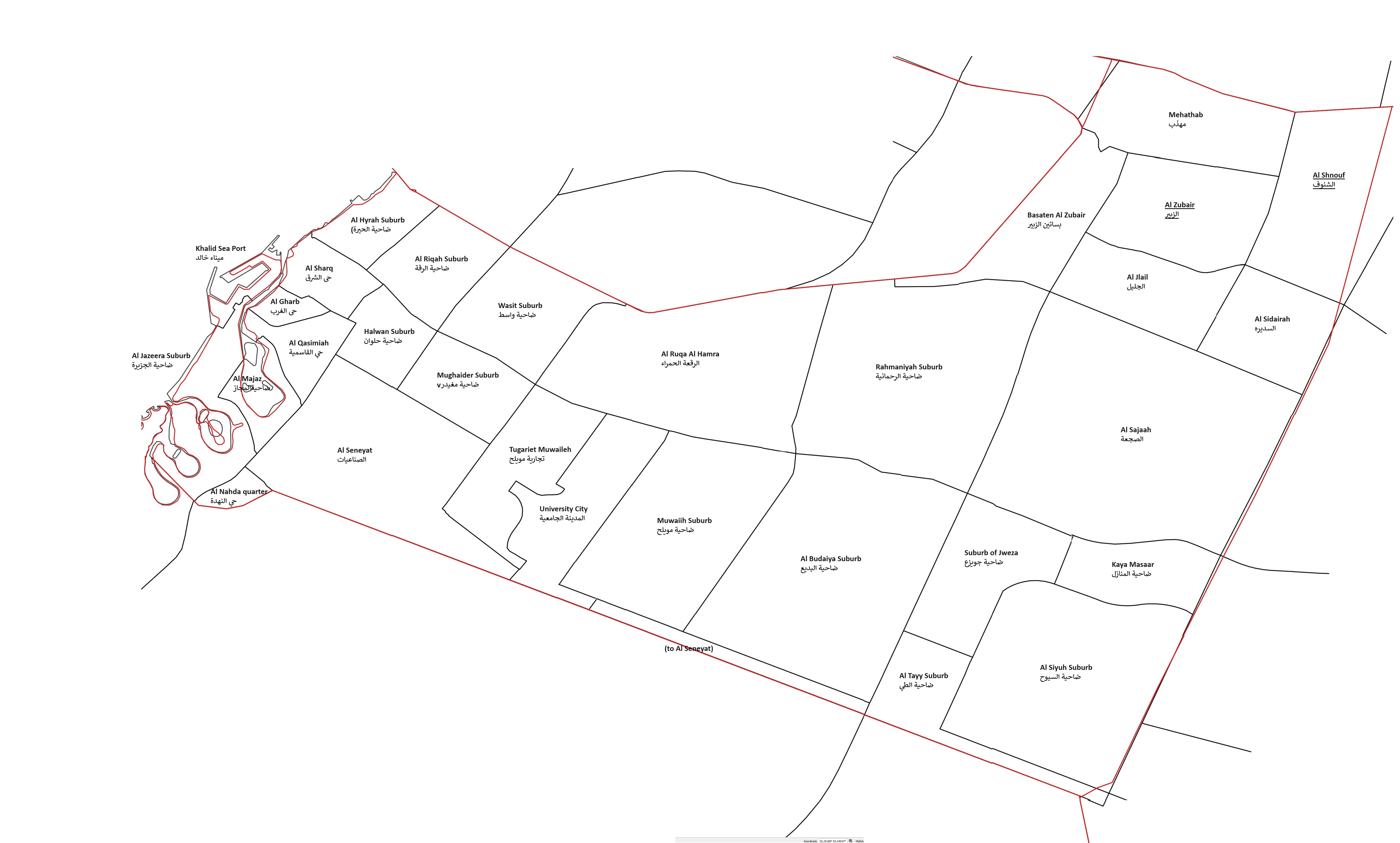
Sharjah City is statistically subdivided into 32 districts. This consists of Sir Abu Nu’ayr island to the Southwest, and the Iran-controlled island of Abu Musa to the Northeast. The map does not show the two latter island districts.

| District بلديات | Name DMG | Arabic | Area km^{2} | Population 2017 | Density | Coordinates | remarks |
|---|---|---|---|---|---|---|---|
| Al Nahda quarter | ... | حي النهدة | 1,67 | 106103 | 63513 | 25.2975°N 55.3753°E | smallest, most dense |
| Al Majaz | ... | ضاحية المجاز | 3,34 | 116503 | 34837 | 25.3266°N 55.3854°E | historic Downtown |
| Al Gharb | ... | حي الغرب | 1,81 | 61564 | 33974 | 25.3617°N 55.3925°E | municipal headquarters |
| Al Qasimiah | ... | حي القاسمية | 4,88 | 159723 | 32721 | 25.3538°N 55.3948°E | |
| Al Sharq | ... | حي الشرق | 4,83 | 100548 | 20838 | 25.3612°N 55.3971°E | |
| Al Seneyat | ... | الصناعيات | 31,66 | 340376 | 10753 | 25.2925°N 55.413°E | |
| Al Jazeera suburb | ... | ضاحية الجزيرة | 9,23 | 98698 | 10692 | 25.3331°N 55.3712°E | |
| Tugariet Muwaileh | ... | تجارية مويلح | 12,23 | 96926 | 7926 | 25.313°N 55.4492°E | |
| Al Riqah suburb | ... | ضاحية الرقة | 9,09 | 39414 | 4337 | 25.3608°N 55.4233°E | |
| Halwan suburb | ... | ضاحية حلوان | 5,79 | 19389 | 3350 | 25.3406°N 55.4289°E | |
| Al Hyrah Suburb | ... | ضاحية الحيرة | 5,73 | 18713 | 3268 | 25.3901°N 55.4141°E | |
| Mughaider suburb | ... | ضاحية مغيدر | 8,35 | 23578 | 2826 | 25.3233°N 55.4397°E | |
| Wasit suburb | ... | ضاحية واسط | 12,07 | 20758 | 1720 | 25.3655°N 55.448°E | |
| Muwaiih suburb | ... | ضاحية مويلح | 25,79 | 30074 | 1167 | 25.2772°N 55.522°E | |
| Al Sajaah | ... | الصجعة | 55,16 | 53079 | 963 | 25.2868°N 55.6509°E | |
| Al Ruqa Al Hamra | ... | الرقعة الحمراء | 32,88 | 19214 | 584 | 25.3185°N 55.5139°E | |
| University City | ... | المدينة الجامعية | 13,39 | 4241 | 317 | 25.2899°N 55.484°E | |
| Rahmaniyah suburb | ... | ضاحية الرحمانية | 39,21 | 9052 | 231 | 25.352°N 55.5515°E | |
| Basaten Al Zubair | ... | بساتين الزبير | 12,64 | 769 | 61 | 25.3875°N 55.6102°E | |
| Al Budaiya suburb | ... | ضاحية البديع | 41,04 | 2427 | 59 | 25.2793°N 55.5234°E | |
| Khalid Sea Port | ... | ميناء خالد | 2,23 | 120 | 54 | 25.364°N 55.3775°E | |
| Al Siyuh suburb | ... | ضاحية السيوح | 33,36 | 1793 | 54 | 25.21568°N 55.62583°E | |
| Al Zubair | ... | الزبير | 15,7 | 674 | 43 | 25.3942°N 55.6401°E | |
| Kaya Masaar | ... | ضاحية المنازل | 9,05 | 269 | 30 | 25.2676°N 55.6412°E | |
| Al Jlail | ... | الجليل | 11,82 | 135 | 11 | 25.3554°N 55.6376°E | |
| Al Shnouf | ... | الشنوف | 24,21 | 151 | 6 | 25.3891°N 55.7265°E | |
| Suburb of Jweza | ... | ضاحية جويزع | 13,85 | 61 | 4 | 25.2729°N 55.6079°E | |
| Mehathab | ... | مهذب | 15,68 | 38 | 2 | 25.4047°N 55.6424°E | |
| Al Tayy suburb | ... | ضاحية الطي | 9,45 | 10 | 1 | 25.21376°N 55.6308°E | |
| Al Sidairah | ... | السديره | 11,07 | 0 | 0 | 25.3382°N 55.6796°E | |
| Sir Abu Nu'ayr | Abū Ṣīr Nuʿair | جزيرة صير أبو نعير | 13,23 | 30 | 2 | 25.226°N 54.238°E | remote island |
| Abu Musa | ... | جزيرة أبو موسى | 12,88 | 43 | 3 | 25.883°N 55.018°E | Iran-occupied island |
| Sharjah City | Madīnat aš-Šāriqa | مدينة الشارقة | 493,80 | 1324473 | 2684 | | |

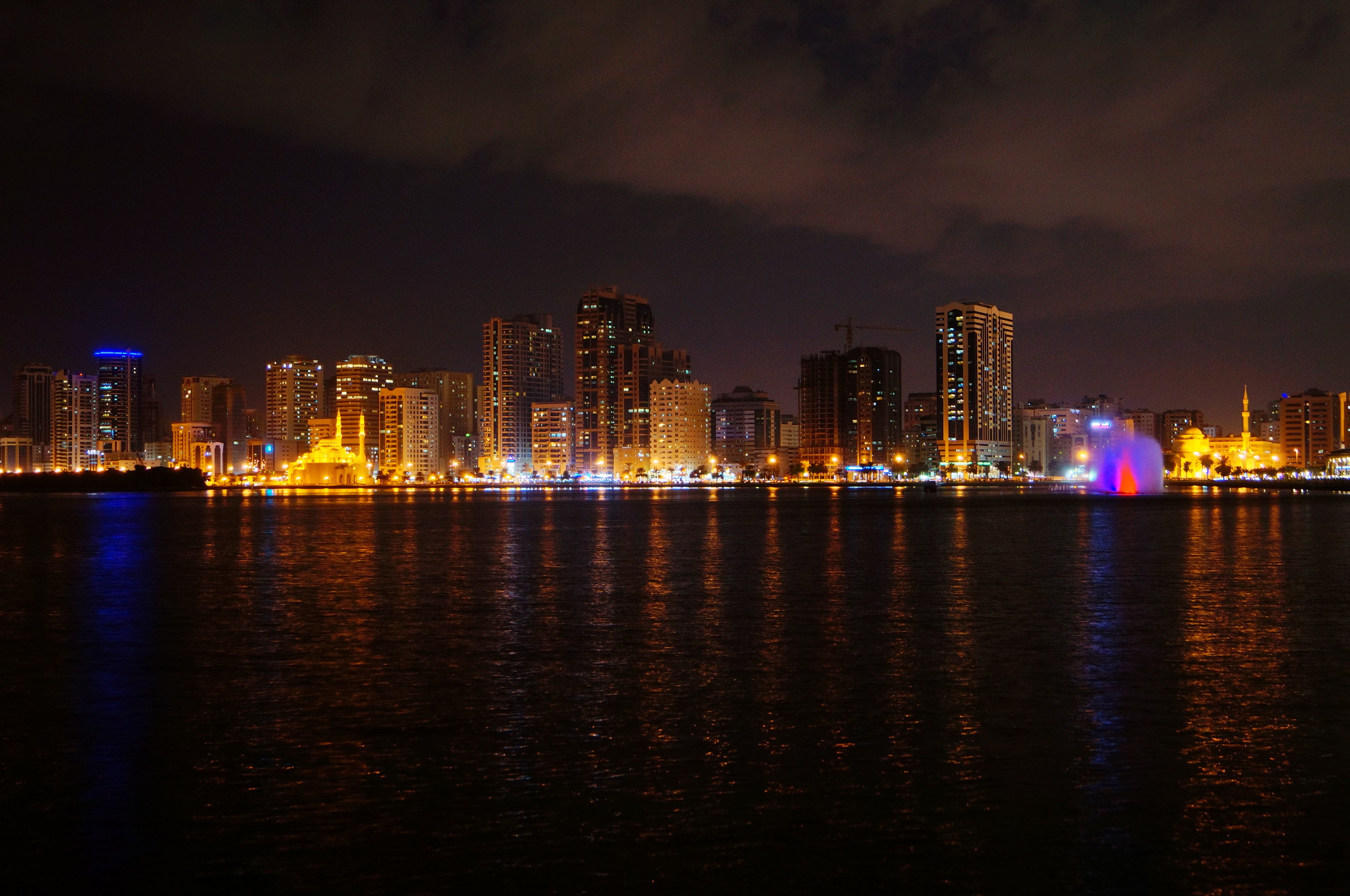
Panoramic view of Downtown Sharjah

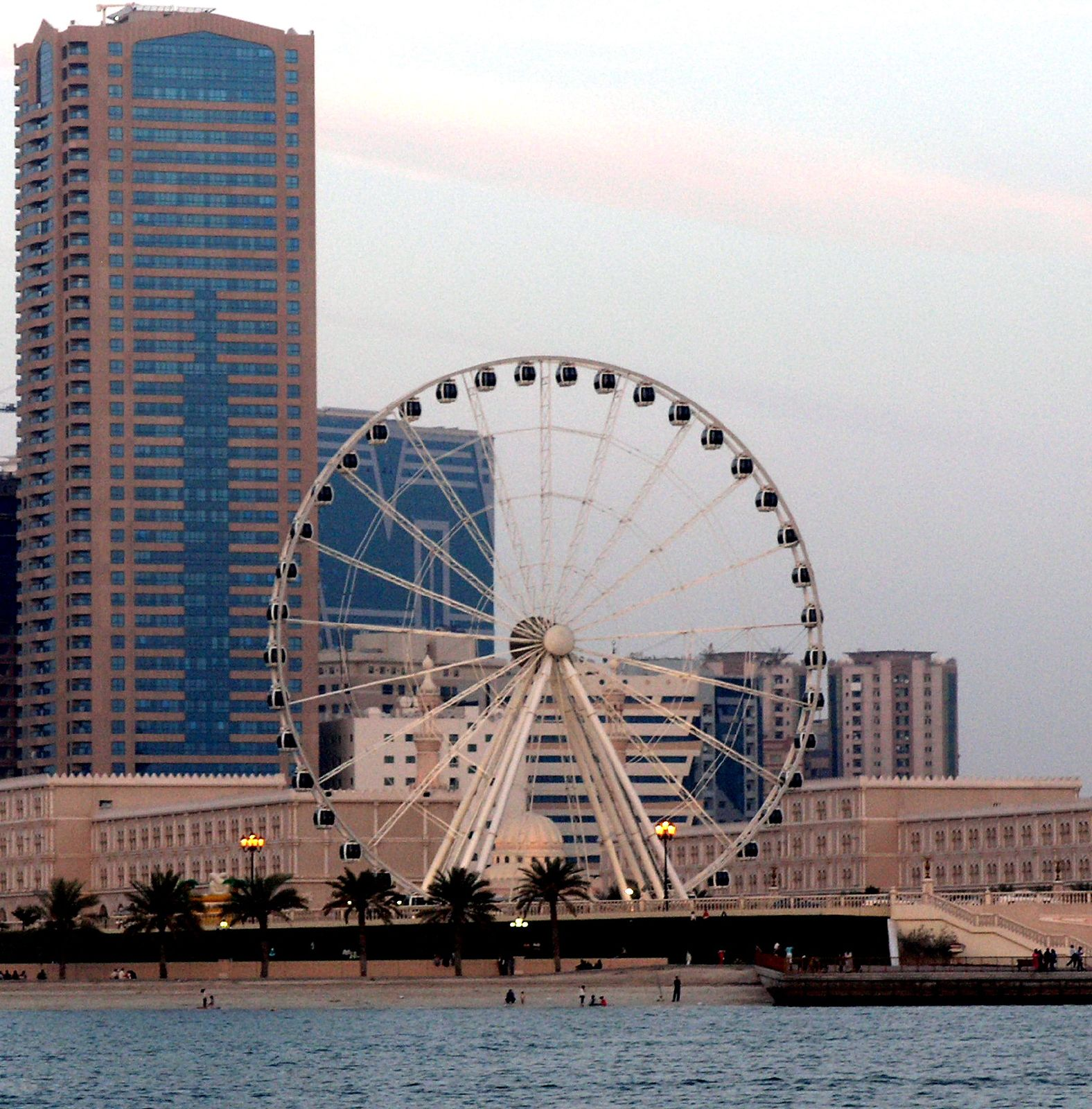
Eye of the Emirates, a 60-metre (200 ft) tall Ferris wheel at Al Qasba. Moved to Al Montazah Parks in 2018.

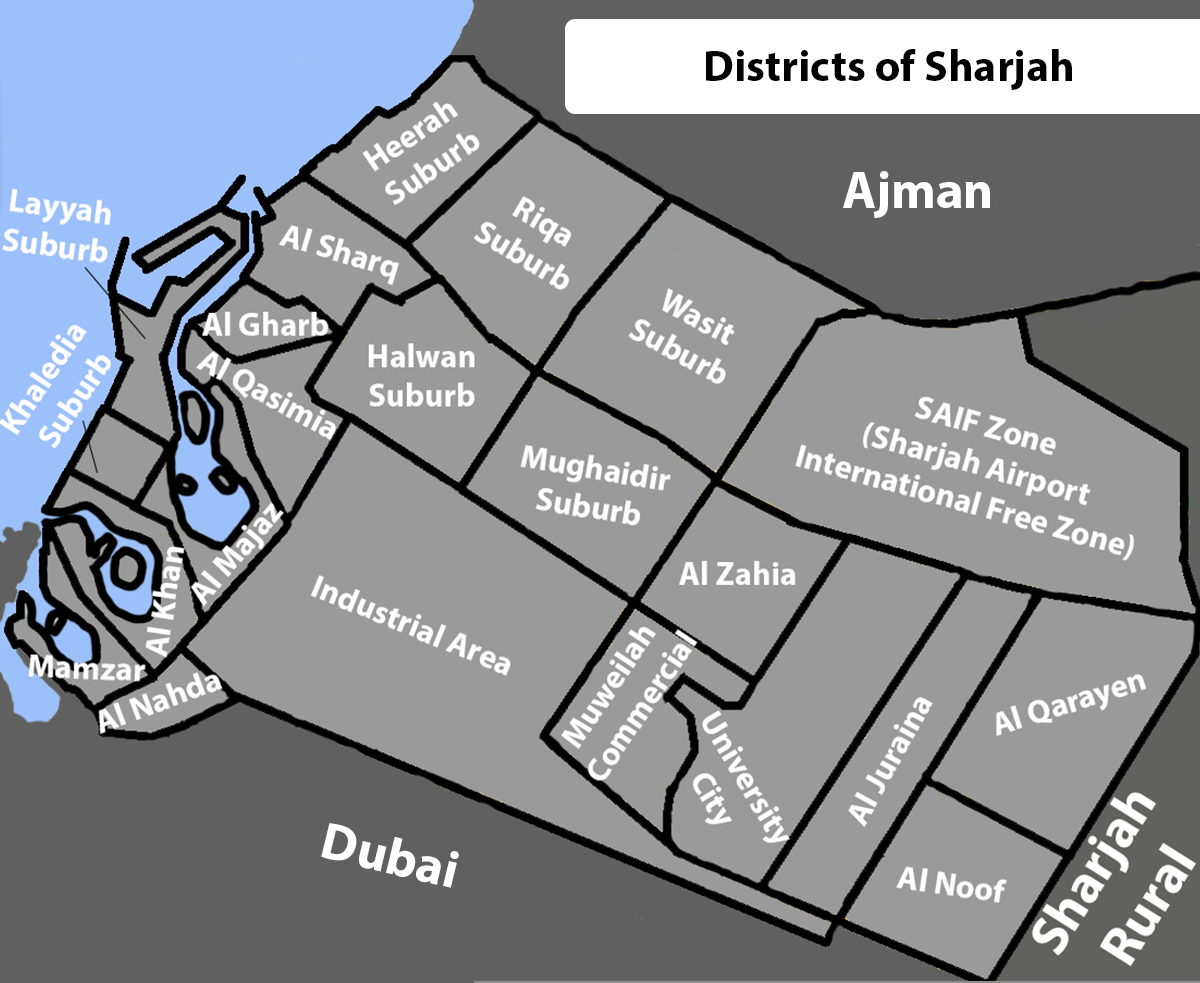
Map of Sharjah's districts

Sharjah is the third largest city in the United Arab Emirates after Dubai and Abu Dhabi. The palace of the ruler of the Emirate of Sharjah, Sheikh Sultan bin Muhammad Al-Qasimi, is located about 20 kilometres (12 mi) southeast of the city.

The city of Sharjah overlooks the Persian Gulf and has a population of over 1,600,000 (2022). It includes the main administrative centres of the Government of Sharjah along with commercial, cultural and traditional projects. The city hosts several museums of archaeology, natural history, science, arts, heritage, Islamic art and culture. Distinctive landmarks include two major covered souks, reflecting Islamic design, and a number of recreational areas and public parks such as Al Montazah Fun Park and Al Buheirah Corniche. The city is also acclaimed for its numerous elegant mosques.

=== Downtown Sharjah ===
Downtown Sharjah or Sharjah City, Al Majaz is a large-scale, mixed-use complex in Sharjah. It serves as the cultural and commercial heart of the emirate. It is characterized by a blend of traditional architecture, modern amenities, and numerous cultural landmarks.

=== Rolla Sharjah ===
It is one of the older parts of the city. It is a key commercial and residential hub within the emirate. Situated east of Khalid lake Rolla Sharjah stands out as a prominent community within the city as a historical and significant landmark within the city of Sharjah. The neighborhood derives its name from a historic banyan tree that once flourished in the area. Rolla is an integral part of the Al Ghuwair development.

=== Muwaileh Commercial ===
Muwaileh Commercial is a Suburb, Community city and residential area in Sharjah, with direct access to Sheikh Mohammed Bin Zayed Road (E311) and Maliah Road. It is a prominent and rapidly developing area in Sharjah. It borders Industrial Area 15 and 17 to the south, and is close to the University City of Sharjah. It also features a diverse range of residential options, consisting of apartment buildings.

=== Rolla Square ===
It is named after the large rolla (banyan tree) that once stood in the square, which inspired the sculpture at the center of the park, Rolla Square is a common location for people to stroll on weekends. Rolla Square Market has a mix of traditional and modern shopping opportunities.

=== Bank Street ===
Bank street is located near the main area of Rolla, many bank branches and offices are located on the street. The street has an urban park where local residents were invited to nominate significant urban features — like benches, trees, playgrounds, and signage — from various cities worldwide that hold personal meaning to them, representing anything from remarkable stories to fleeting memories. These objects were selected from the residents' home countries or places they came across during their travels. They were either replicated in exact 1:1 scale or purchased and transported to the designated site.

=== Al Hisn Sharjah ===
Al Hisn, also known as Sharjah Fort, was a fortified complex built in 1823 as the headquarters of the then-independent Emirate of Sharjah and the residence of the Al Qasimi family. Its situated in the center of the city, and was closed for renovations from 1996 to 2015, and it reopened its doors as an open-air museum under the administration of the Sharjah Museums Authority. The materials that were used for the building of the fort — ceilings are made out of chandal (mangrove poles), kumbar (rope), du’un (bound palm branches) and haseer (palm matts). The walls, with a thickness of 70–80 cm, are plastered with corals, harvested from the Gulf seabed and held in place using jus – a mortar formed by crushing and burning corals, limestone and shells.

=== "Smile, You're in Sharjah" roundabout ===
Located between the Blue Souq and Fish Market, near Union Bank Tower, the roundabout features a floral sign that reads “Smile, You’re in Sharjah.” It is a well-known landmark, although it often experiences heavy traffic during rush hour.

=== Gold Souq ===
Sharjah Central Souq, or Gold Souq (Arabic: سوق, lit. 'market'), stands as Sharjah premier shopping destination and comprises a gold souq, clothing souq, and antiques and jewellery shops. It stands out due to its design by British architects Michael Lyle & Partners under the guidance of Sharjah's ruler, H.H Sheikh Dr. Sultan Bin Mohammed Al Qasimi, the building was completed in 1978. Its architecture evokes a grand-scale traditional bazaar. It is situated along the Khalid Lagoon and offers a stunning view of sunset. The Central Souq which is also called the Blue Souq includes around 600 shops and each shop has a unique design.

=== Mahatta Fort ===
Mahatta Fort, now known as the Al Mahatta Museum, is a museum on the site of the first airport built in the region in 1932 by Imperial Airways. The adjacent fort was constructed by then-Ruler of Sharjah Sultan bin Saqr Al Qasimi as a rest stop for travelling crew and for protection against any potential attacks. The fort and airport were used extensively by the Royal Air Force during World War II, and after the war the fort became the headquarters of the Trucial Oman Scouts. The airport remained in use up to 1977, when Sharjah International Airport opened. The runway strip was converted into a highway and the buildings were renovated into Al Mahatta Museum, which opened in 2000.

=== The Heart of Sharjah ===
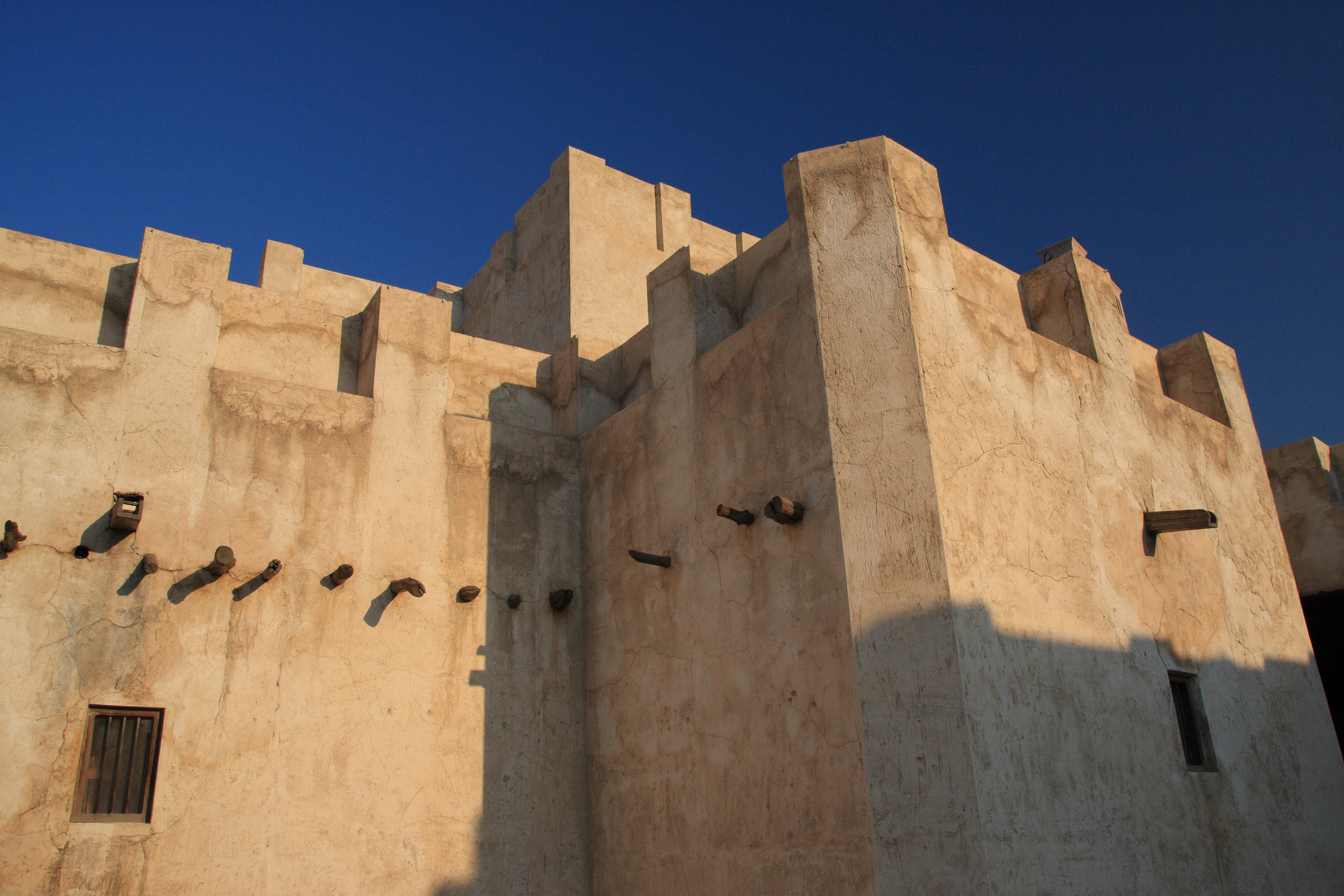
Sharjah Heritage District

The Heart of Sharjah is an ongoing renovation and preservation project of the former old city center of Sharjah. The project aims to develop the former old city center into an open-air museum with various smaller museums, galleries and commercial centers. The project is home to a 5-star hotel and the traditional Souk Al Arsa, a covered souk with an array of items for sale, including antiques.

=== Al Qasba Canal ===
Al-Qasba Canal is a 1-kilometer-long canal that runs through the center of Sharjah. Located along its waterfront are several apartments, shops, and tourist attractions of the Al Qasba community. The theatre in Qasba celebrates different types of cultural events every year. It becomes more crowded during the festival season.

=== Sharjah Heritage Museum ===
The Sharjah Heritage Museum is situated near the Bait Al Naboodah, directly across from Souq Al Arsah. It is built around a shaded courtyard as a reconstruction of traditional family life. There are many rooms which have display of traditional furniture along with household items including children's costumes, toys, and jewellery.

=== Sharjah National Park ===
Sharjah National Park spanning nearly 630,000 sq ft (59,000 m^{2}) is the city's largest green space, offering a wide range of attractions ideal for families which is popular among both locals and tourists, it features amenities such as barbecue areas with picnic tables and grilling stations, a playground with swings and slides under sheltering canopies, and a duck pond. Moreover, visitors can explore cycling tracks and a miniature clay model of Sharjah's landmarks. There is a small mosque for prayers nearby

=== Sharjah Aquarium ===
Since its opening in 2008 Sharjah's Aquarium which is located in Al Layyeh, has become an attraction to adults and children. Managed by the Sharjah Museums Authority, renowned for its educational initiatives, the aquarium features 20 tanks across two floors, housing diverse sea creatures in its 6,500 square meter space. There is an "underwater" tunnel through a section of the aquarium.

=== Al Noor Island ===
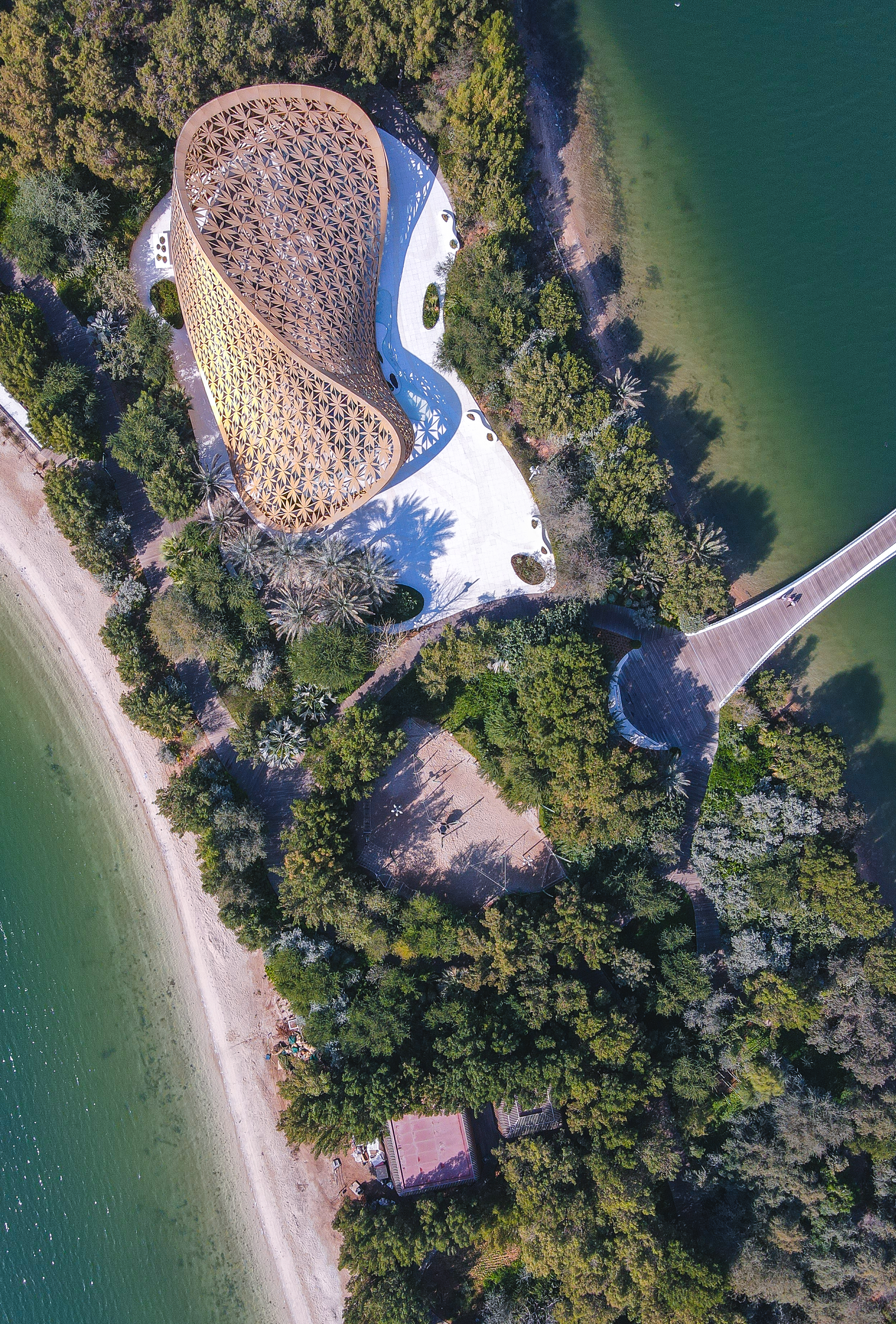
Aerial view of Al Noor Island

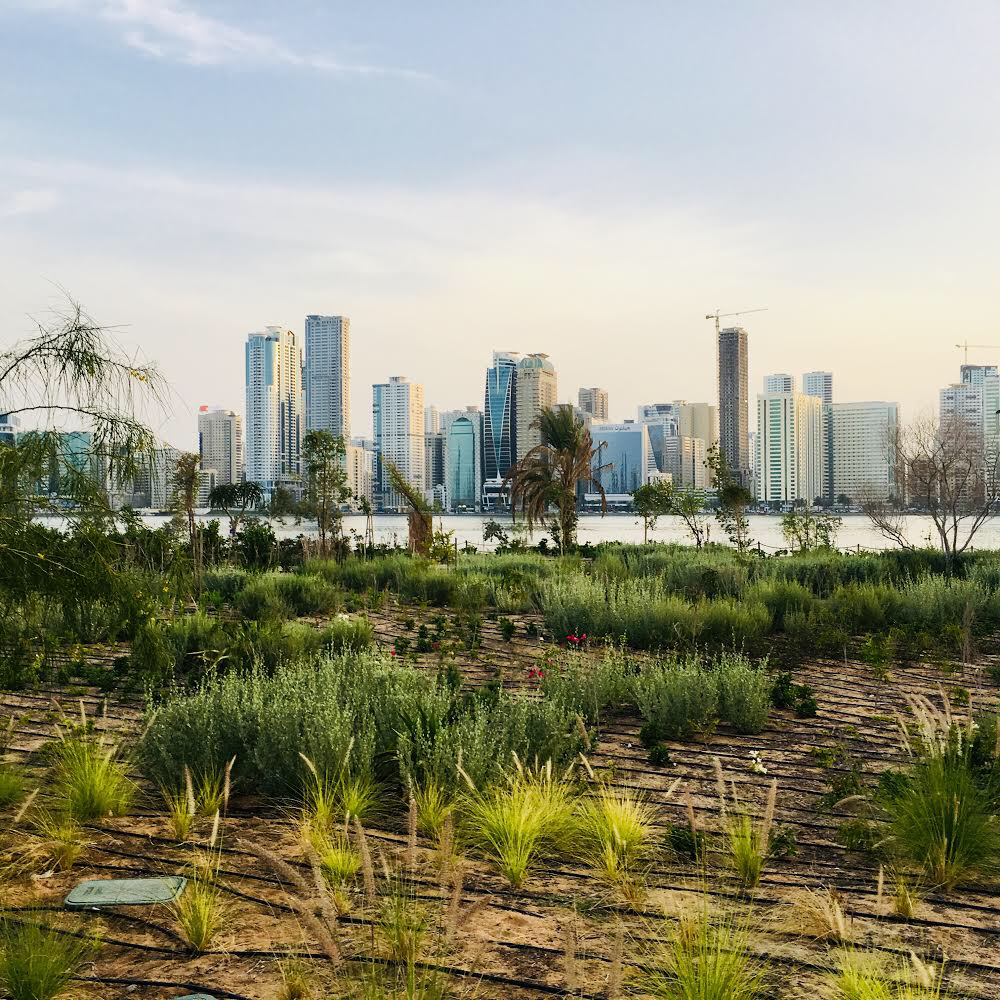
Inside Al Noor island with Sharjah skyline in the back

Al Noor Island is a landscaped island located in the Khalid Lagoon covering an area of 45,470 m^{2} (489,400 sq ft). It has been developed by Shurooq and opened in December 2015. It is a cultural and leisure destination intended to attract tourists. The island is accessible via a short boat ride from the mainland and can also be reached by a pedestrian bridge that connects it to the Al Noor Mosque. Its design places emphasis on the flora of the island which includes over 70000 plants and trees including an olive tree that is over 250 years old.

=== Maryam Island ===
Maryam Island is a beachfront destination that oversees the Arabian sea. It is one of the largest projects in the emirate with an investment of 2.4 billion Dirhams (US$650M). Waterside development is planned to spread across 460,000 m^{2} (5,000,000 sq ft), with a built-up area of 310,000 m^{2} (3,300,000 sq ft). The Maryam Island development will feature 38 residential buildings with over 35,000 units. This community will offer residents many facilities which includes a 900-metre waterfront promenade, fitness clubs, swimming pools for kids and adults, an indoor garden, 4,000 square metre Maryam Park, jogging tracks, basketball courts, and a playground for children.

=== Wildlife centers ===
The Arabian Wildlife Center opened in 1999 and was home to more than 100 species of animals. Situated at a convenient location, this center was quite close to the Sharjah International Airport. The Sharjah Wildlife Centre has introduced a pair of rare long-eared hedgehogs which is one of the fascinating species at the centre. These hedgehogs are known for their distinctive long ears, which help them detect predators and navigate their environment. Despite the hot and dry conditions in most of Arabia, there were a number of mammal species who adapted to these conditions. The Breeding Centre for Endangered Wildlife, a sister facility, was a member of the EAZA, like Al Ain Zoo in the Emirate of Abu Dhabi, but is now closed to the public. The fauna, including the Arabian leopard, which are found in the mountains in the eastern part of the country, were transferred to Al Hefaiyah Conservation Centre in the eastern area of Kalba. In 2001, The center assisted Yemeni zoos in Sana'a and Ta'izz with the management of their animals.

=== Al Majaz Waterfront ===
Al Majaz Waterfront is a leisure area, a waterfront landmark of Sharjah Featuring an audio-video dancing fountain, miniature golf and a number of restaurants. At a distance of 1 km from Blue Souk, 18 km from Sharjah International Airport and 14 km from Dubai International Airport.

In 2023 a redevelopment project was done involving a complete overhaul of the park, including the installation of a new irrigation system, construction of new walking paths, children's play areas, and a parking plot valued around 5.5 million AED which took 6 months to complete. This is the main attractions for family and friends in Sharjah where many activities like waterside destination which includes mini golf, a splash park, a mini-train and many more attractions are available for kids.

=== Rain Room ===
Rain Room, an experiential artwork created by Hannes Koch and Florian Ortkrass of Random International in 2012, was permanently installed for the first time in Sharjah, United Arab Emirates, in 2018. This artwork allows people to visit the installation and walk through a rain downpour without getting wet, as their movement in dark spaces is detected by motion sensors. The Sharjah Art Foundation constructed a purpose-built visitor center located in the city's residential area of Al Majarrah to house the permanent installation of Rain Room. The Sharjah Rain Room recycles about 1,200 liters of rainwater during each visit.

=== The Flying Saucer ===
Reconstructed in 2015 and launched as a redeveloped arts and community center in 2020, The Flying Saucer, Sharjah is a brutalist building dating back to the 1970s. It was re-opened after a two-year renovation project by the Sharjah Art Foundation (SAF). The Flying Saucer building looks like a circular with a dome-like structure on top and its roof is wide, disc-shaped with a smooth and clean finish which is supported by several V shaped columns.

The Sharjah Light Festival is held every year since 2010 in various landmarks around Sharjah. It is a display of lights using projectors and lasers on buildings. Usually, the shows have a small storyline or a theme.

=== Places of worship ===
Sharjah's largest mosque, the "Sharjah Mosque" was inaugurated in May 2019. Located in the area of Tay, at the junction of the Emirates Road and the road to Mleiha. It can accommodate up to 25,000 worshipers, with an interior capacity of over 5,000 people. Two coins, one gold and one silver, each inscribed with a verse from the Quran, were issued by the Central Bank of the United Arab Emirates, and designed by the Sharjah Islamic Bank, to commemorate the occasion. Earlier, the King Faisal Mosque, named after King Faisal of Saudi Arabia, had been the largest in the Emirate and country, with an area of 10,000–12,000 m^{2} (110,000–130,000 sq ft).

In 1997, a Syriac Orthodox church, St. Mary's Jacobite Syrian Soonoro Patriarchal Cathedral, was consecrated to accommodate a growing population of Syriac Christians, many of whom are migrant workers from Kerala and southern India.

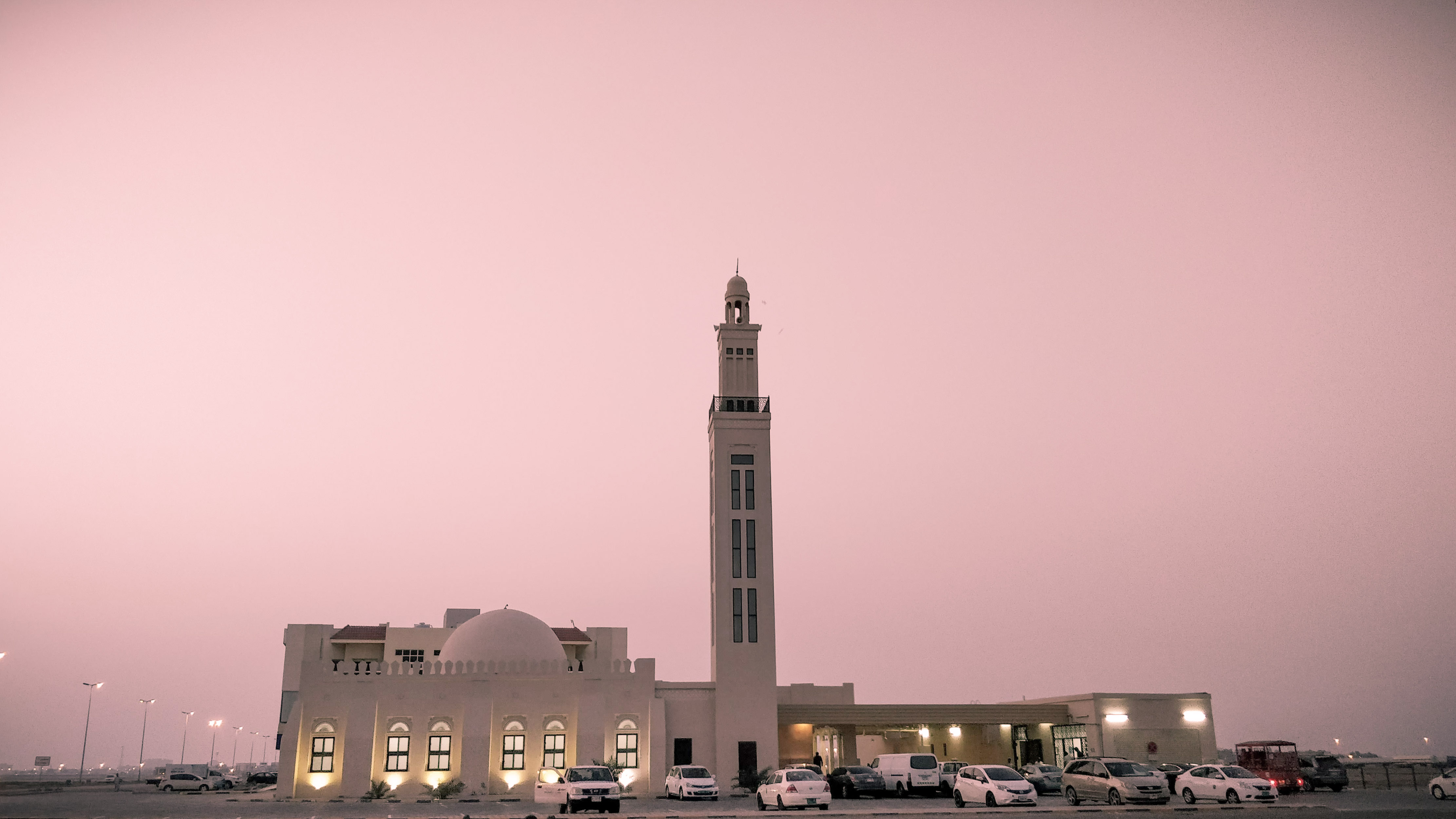
Mosque

Al-Noor Mosque

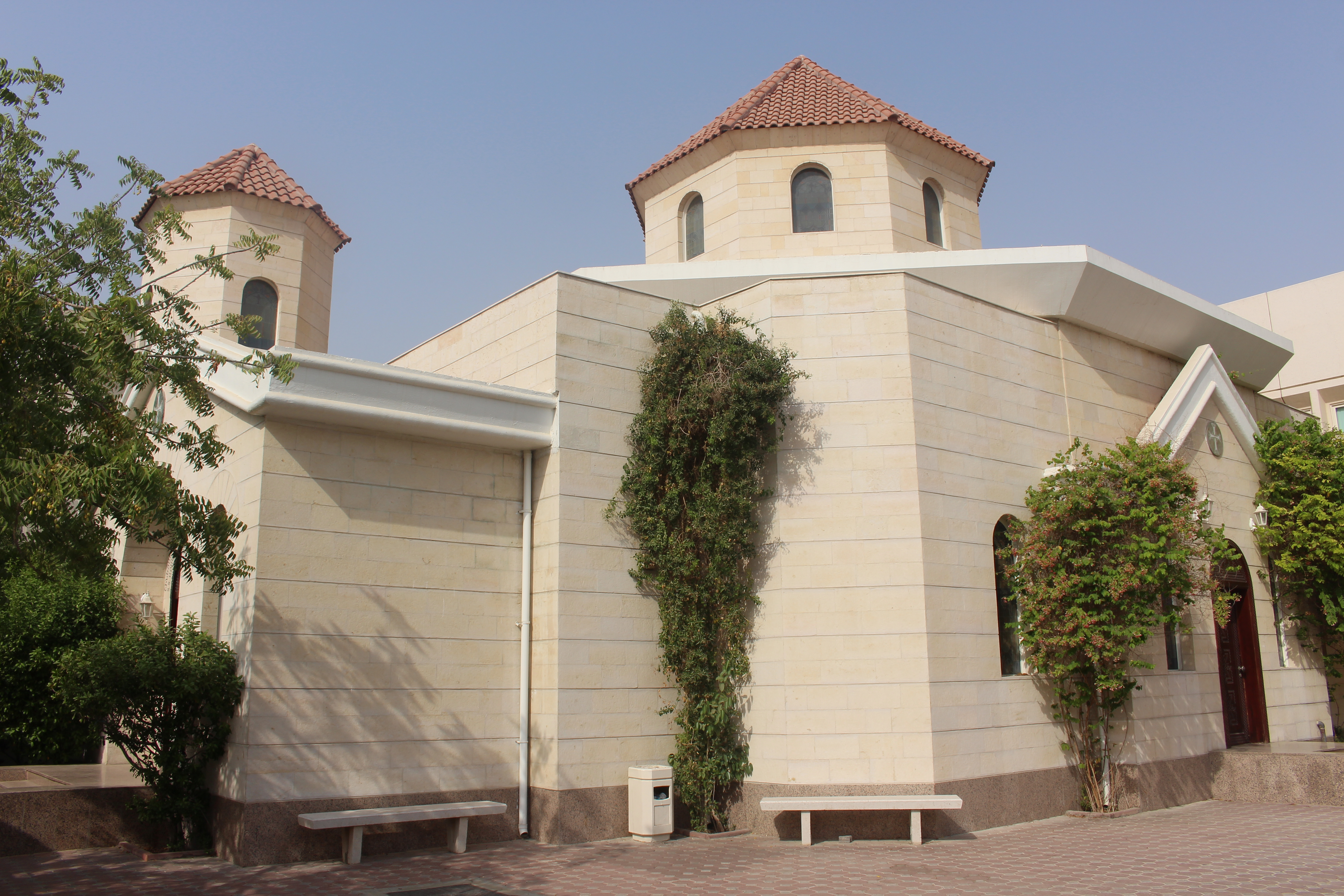
Saint Gregory the Illuminator Armenian Apostolic Church

St. Philip the Apostle Russian Orthodox Church

=== Al Rahmaniyah parks ===
In March 2021, the Sharjah Investment and Development authorities opened two parks in Al Rahmaniyah, Kshisha and Shaghrafa, built in a total area of 147,700 m^{2} (1,590,000 sq ft). It included a female-only park, along with entertainment, social, sports and educational facilities. It also includes an artificial pond where visitors can feed the duck. Barbecues are prohibited on the site of the park, so visitors can bring their own food into the park.

=== House of Wisdom ===
In December 2020, Sultan bin Muhammad Al-Qasimi inaugurated a library inspired by the original House of Wisdom in Baghdad. The building was designed by Foster and Partners, extending over 12,000 m^{2} (130,000 sq ft). On the grounds of the library is a large art piece entitled "The Scroll", a contemporary interpretation of the ancient Arabic scrolls, made by Gerry Judah. It was made to celebrate the Emirate of Sharjah being named the UNESCO World Book Capital for 2019.

== Climate ==
Sharjah has a hot desert climate (Köppen climate classification BWh), with warm winters and extremely hot summers. The average daytime temperature during the summer ranges between 38 °C (100 °F) to 42 °C (108 °F), and on some days the temperature exceeds 45 °C (113 °F) mainly during the hottest months of July and August. During winter, the average daytime temperature rarely exceeds 30 °C (86 °F). Rainfall is generally light and erratic, and occurs generally from November to July. February and March account for nearly two-third of the year's rainfall.

Climate data for Sharjah (Sharjah International Airport) 1991-2020
| Month | Jan | Feb | Mar | Apr | May | Jun | Jul | Aug | Sep | Oct | Nov | Dec | Year |
|---|---|---|---|---|---|---|---|---|---|---|---|---|---|
| Record high °C (°F) | 32.5 (90.5) | 38.7 (101.7) | 42.5 (108.5) | 44.6 (112.3) | 46.9 (116.4) | 48.5 (119.3) | 49.0 (120.2) | 48.5 (119.3) | 47.7 (117.9) | 43.0 (109.4) | 37.7 (99.9) | 33.9 (93.0) | 49.0 (120.2) |
| Mean daily maximum °C (°F) | 24.8 (76.6) | 26.5 (79.7) | 29.6 (85.3) | 34.9 (94.8) | 39.7 (103.5) | 41.9 (107.4) | 42.9 (109.2) | 42.9 (109.2) | 40.7 (105.3) | 36.9 (98.4) | 31.4 (88.5) | 26.9 (80.4) | 34.9 (94.9) |
| Daily mean °C (°F) | 18.5 (65.3) | 19.9 (67.8) | 22.7 (72.9) | 27.1 (80.8) | 31.4 (88.5) | 33.7 (92.7) | 35.5 (95.9) | 35.3 (95.5) | 32.6 (90.7) | 29.0 (84.2) | 24.4 (75.9) | 20.5 (68.9) | 27.6 (81.6) |
| Mean daily minimum °C (°F) | 12.8 (55.0) | 13.8 (56.8) | 16.3 (61.3) | 19.7 (67.5) | 23.7 (74.7) | 26.5 (79.7) | 29.2 (84.6) | 28.9 (84.0) | 25.9 (78.6) | 22.2 (72.0) | 18.1 (64.6) | 14.5 (58.1) | 21.0 (69.7) |
| Record low °C (°F) | 3.4 (38.1) | 2.5 (36.5) | 5.8 (42.4) | 10.9 (51.6) | 13.0 (55.4) | 17.8 (64.0) | 21.7 (71.1) | 22.2 (72.0) | 18.4 (65.1) | 12.3 (54.1) | 8.1 (46.6) | 4.9 (40.8) | 2.5 (36.5) |
| Average precipitation mm (inches) | 22.4 (0.88) | 12.2 (0.48) | 23.2 (0.91) | 4.8 (0.19) | 0.1 (0.00) | 0.5 (0.02) | 2.9 (0.11) | 0.022 (0.00) | 0.3 (0.01) | 2.1 (0.08) | 6.9 (0.27) | 18.2 (0.72) | 93.7 (3.69) |
| Average precipitation days (≥ 1.0 mm) | 2.9 | 2.6 | 3.6 | 1.6 | 1.5 | 1.0 | 1.7 | 0.0 | 2.0 | 1.0 | 1.9 | 2.8 | 22.6 |
| Average relative humidity (%) | 69 | 67 | 63 | 53 | 47 | 52 | 53 | 53 | 59 | 62 | 64 | 69 | 59.4 |
| Mean monthly sunshine hours | 235.1 | 230.7 | 265.4 | 296.3 | 333.1 | 307.3 | 319.0 | 302.6 | 279.8 | 286.5 | 251.8 | 229.5 | 3,337.1 |
Source 1: NOAA (humidity 1981–2010)
Source 2: National Center of Meteorology Climate Yearly Report 2003-2019

== Transport ==
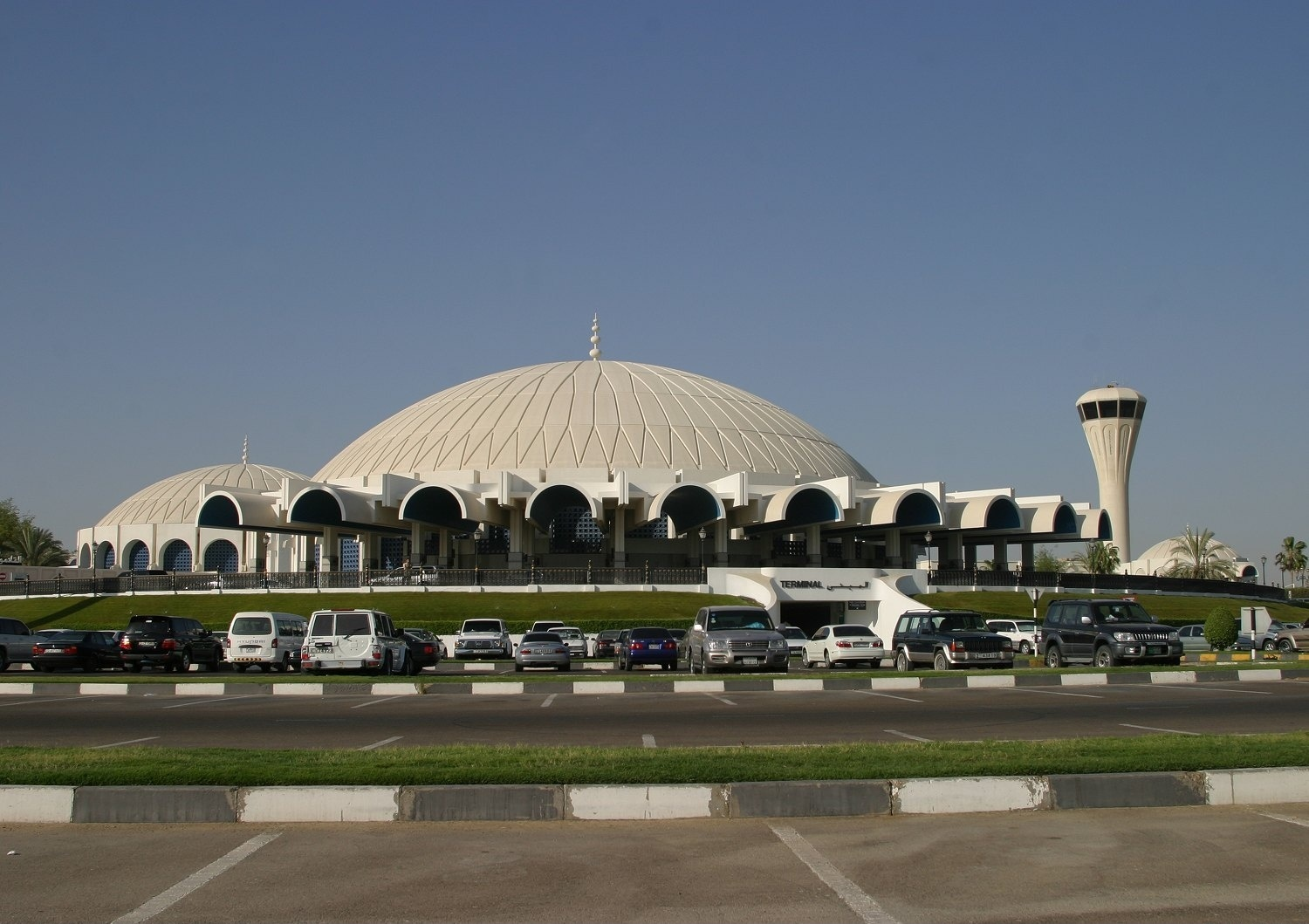
Sharjah Airport

Development of transportation services in Sharjah is a critical long-term task. Planned by the SPTC since 2008, the Sharjah Metro will be the third metro system in the UAE after the Dubai Metro and the Abu Dhabi Metro. The Sharjah Tram has been planned since 2015, and will be the second tram system in the country after the Dubai Tram.

=== Air ===
The Sharjah International Airport is the third-largest Middle East airfreight hub in cargo tonnage, according to official 2015 statistics from Airports Council International. Sharjah International Airport is the home base of Air Arabia, a low-cost carrier.

The first international flight in Sharjah landed on 5 October 1932 in the Mahatta Fort airstrip as part of a refueling stop on Imperial Airways's India–Britain route. The former airport hosted a cinema, hotel, and a restaurant, and would eventually become a Royal Air Force military base until the UAE's independence in 1971. Mahatta Fort was the main international airport for the city until 1976, when traffic moved to Sharjah International Airport.

=== Road ===
There are two major series of highways in Sharjah, which are "E" and "S". E represents roads connecting other emirates, and S for roads within the emirate.

The major roads in Sharjah include:

- E 88: Al Dhaid Road, connecting to the Emirate of Fujairah.
- E 102: Sharjah–Kalbah Road, connecting to Fujairah and Kalba.
- E 311: Sheikh Mohammad Bin Zayed Road, connecting to Dubai, Ajman and Ras al-Khaimah.
- E 11: Al Ittihad Road, connecting to Dubai.
- E 611: Emirates Road, connecting to Dubai, Ajman and Ras Al-Khaimah
- S 112: Maliha Road/King Faisal Street.

=== Taxi ===
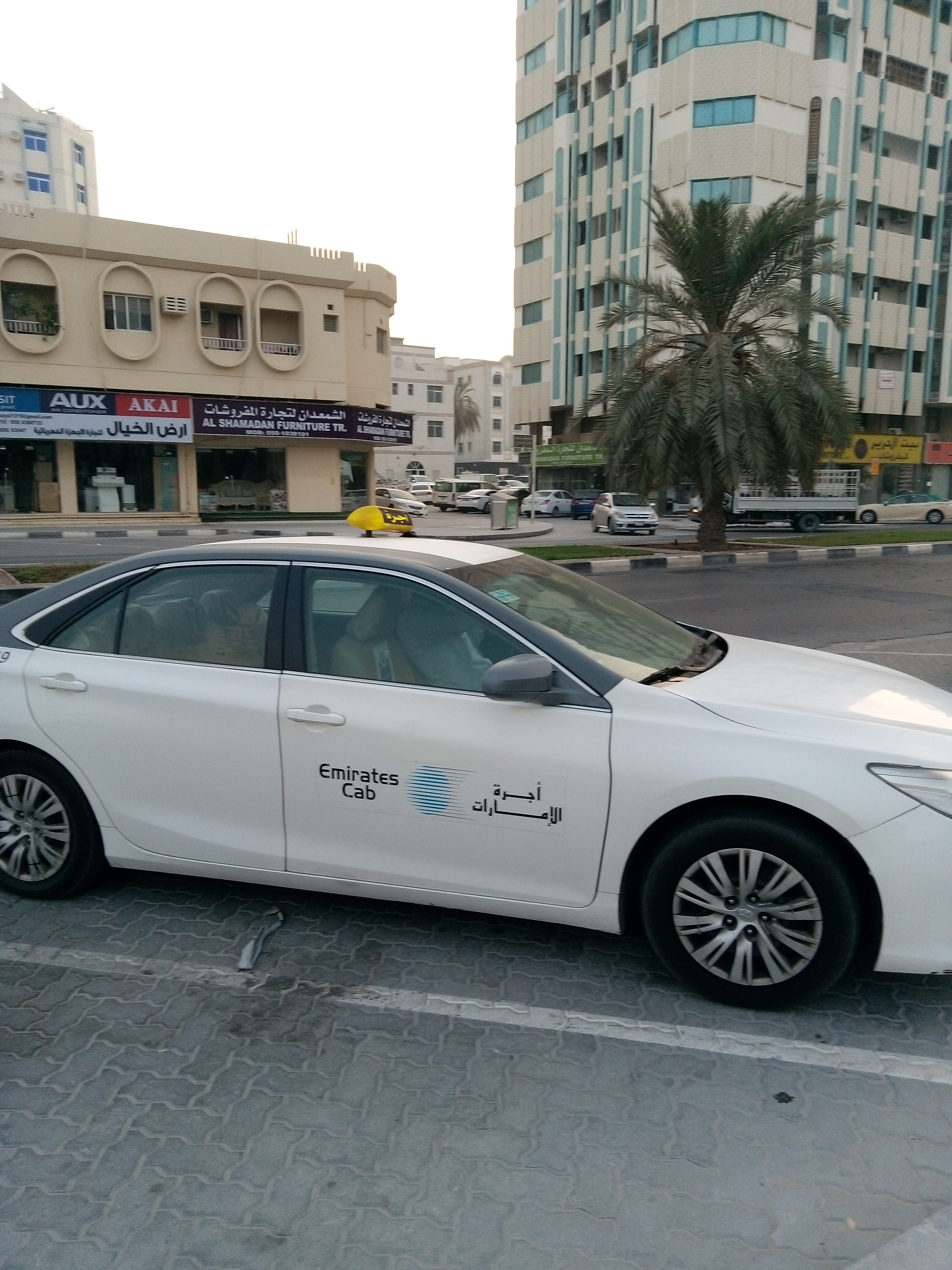
Emirates Cab

The Sharjah Public Transportation Corporation organizes and supervises the operations of taxis in Sharjah Emirate. Sharjah taxi service is provided through franchise companies. They are the major taxi operators in the emirates. If one goes from one emirate to another, taxi drivers will charge 20 dirhams as rent. They cover all parts of the Emirate and cities, including shopping centers, residential areas and airport.

- Sharjah Taxi: Sharjah City and Eastern Regions.
- Emirates Cab: Sharjah City.
- City Taxi: Sharjah City and Eastern Regions.
- Union Taxi: Sharjah City.
- Advantage Taxi: Sharjah City and Central Regions.

The Sharjah Transport Corporation also provides shared transportation with the purpose of serving certain routes in Sharjah on a fixed rate for each route without using the meter. Sharjah Sharing Taxi routes are carefully selected to support people with low income covering areas with frequent needs for quick transfer within the same location, to ease the traffic situation in Sharjah.

=== Intercity transport ===
The SRTA operates passenger bus services nationwide, between Sharjah City (Sharjah Al Jubail Bus station), Ras Al Khaimah, Khor Fakkan, Kalba, Fujairah, Masafi, Ajman, Umm Al Quwain, Hamriyah Free Zone, Dhaid, Al Madam, Dibba Al Hisn, Abu Dhabi, Al Ain and Dubai.

== Utility services ==
Utility services in the emirate are provided by the Sharjah Electricity and Water Authority, which provides electricity, water and LPG connections to over 1.8 million consumers. They have over 4,000 employees serving areas as far as Dhaid, Kalba and Khorfakkan. Telephone services in the emirate, both fixed lines and mobile services, are provided by the government-owned Etisalat and du communication.

Sharjah obtains 80% of its fresh water by seawater desalination.

== Culture ==
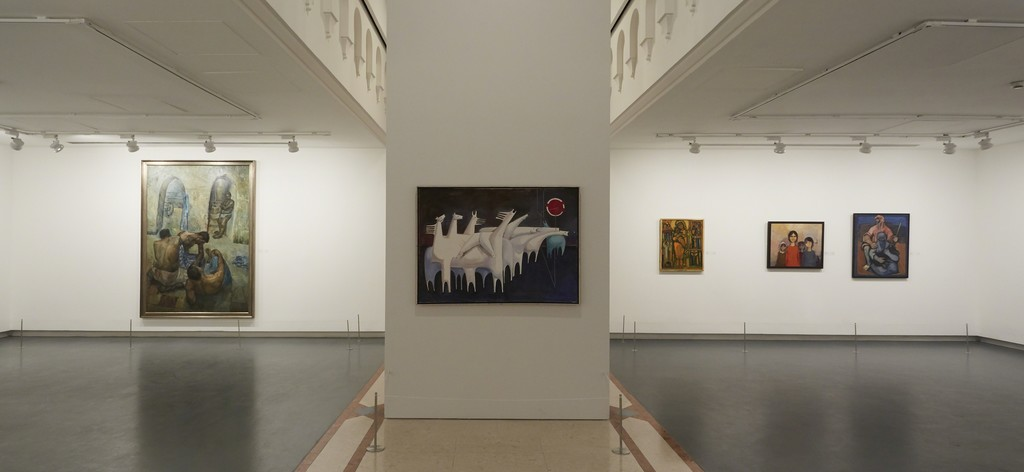
Modern Art exhibition by Barjeel Art Foundation at the Sharjah Art Museum

UAE culture mainly revolves around the religion of Islam and traditional Arab culture. The influence of Islamic and Arabic culture on its architecture, music, attire, cuisine and lifestyle are very prominent. Five times a day, Muslims are called to prayer from the minarets of mosques, which are spread across the country. Since 2006, the weekend has been Friday and Saturday, as a compromise between Friday's holiness to Muslims and the Western weekend of Saturday and Sunday.

The sale or consumption of alcoholic beverages is prohibited in the emirate without an alcohol license and alcohol is not served in hotels, restaurants or other outlets in Sharjah. This has helped Sharjah increase the number of Islamic tourists who visit the country. Sharjah was designated the 2019 World Book Capital by UNESCO.

A cultural heritage project, Heart of Sharjah, has been undertaken to preserve and restore the old town of Sharjah and return it to its 1950s glory. A five-phase project intended for completion in 2025, the project is being undertaken by the Sharjah Investment and Development Authority, Shurooq, together with the Sharjah Institute for Heritage, the Sharjah Museums Department, and the Sharjah Art Foundation.

Sharjah International Book Fair is a cultural event held every year in Sharjah.

== Economy ==
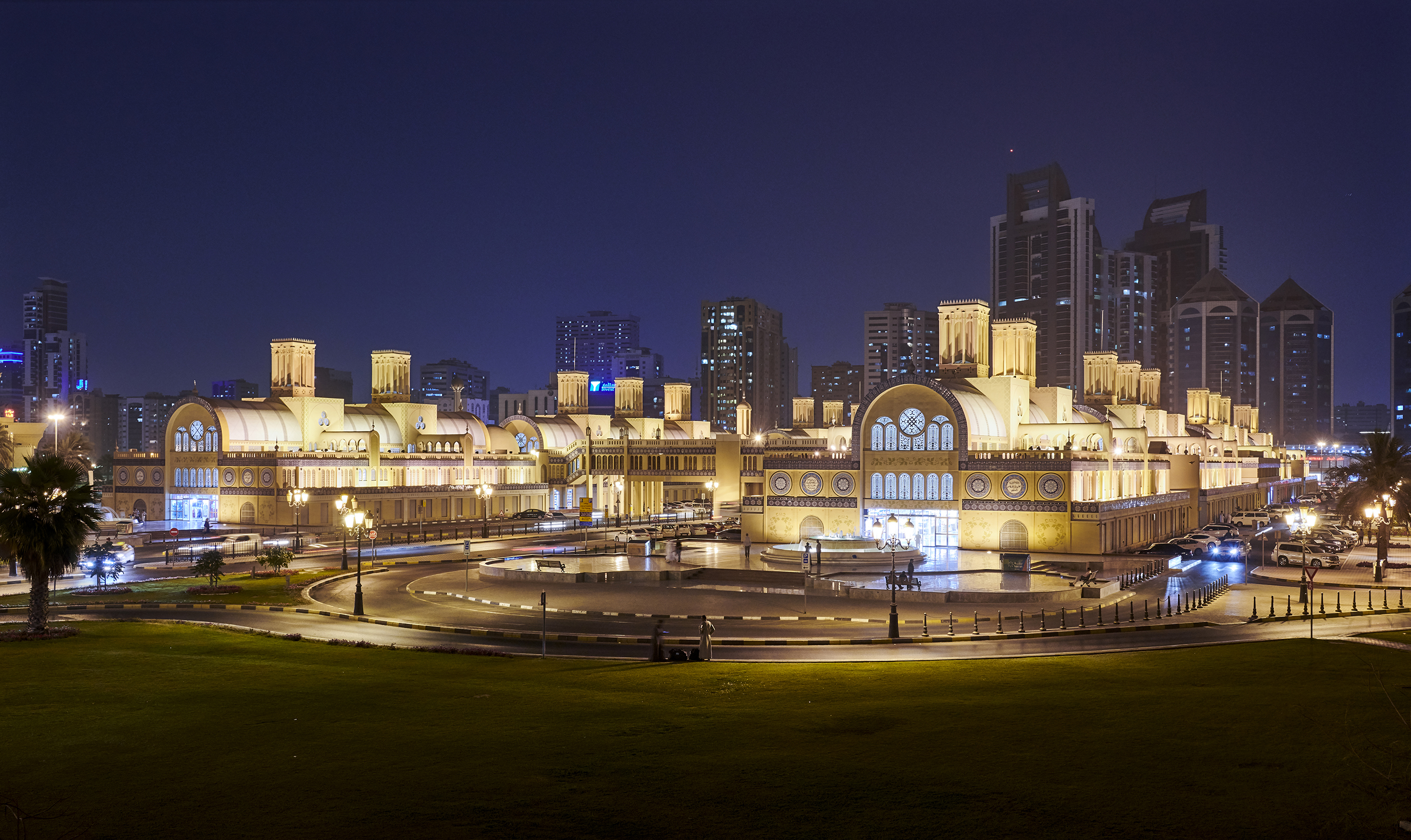
Sharjah Central Souq at night

Sharjah is the headquarters of Air Arabia, the first low-cost airline in the Middle East, which operates to the Middle East, Asia and Europe. Its headquarters are located in the Sharjah Freight Center, on the property of the Sharjah International Airport.

The Sharjah Airport International Free Zone, popularly known as "SAIF Zone", is one of the prominent free-trade zones in the UAE. More than 6000 companies operate from SAIF Zone. The cost of setting up business in Sharjah is less than in any other emirates of the UAE, and the focus of industrialization (Sharjah Industrial area) has in recent years turned Sharjah into a commercial center. Thanks to its 100% foreign ownership and exemption from income and corporate taxes, SAIF Zone has attracted investors from more than 90 countries. This led to a business friendly atmosphere leading to a 6.5 percent surge, reaching approximately AED 145.2 billion in 2023, compared to 136.4 billion in 2022, which marked a 4.9 percent growth from 2021.

== Demographics ==
According to the 2022 census, the total population of the emirate was 1.8 million, with 1.6 million of them residing in the city of Sharjah. Of the 1.8 million total population of the emirate, 208,000 were Emirati citizens, and the remainder were expatriates.

Like the rest of the UAE, Arabic is the official and national language of the emirate and is used in all official capacities. However, all traffic signs, information posts, and government press releases are also written in English. South Asian languages such as Tamil, Hindi, Odia, Urdu, Malayalam, Telugu, Bengali etc. are spoken widely by the residents of emirate. Russian is also used by the Russian and Central Asian community. Islam is the predominant religion in the emirate.

== Education ==
There are several public and private schools in addition to universities in Sharjah, including the University of Sharjah, University of Al Dhaid (which has a strategic relationship with the UK's University of Liverpool and the University of Exeter) and together they have established the University of Al Dhaid College of Veterinary Medicine, American University of Sharjah, Skyline College Sharjah, Al Qasimia University, Westford School of Management, Exeed School of Business and Finance, Sharjah Men's College and Sharjah Women's College. Few of these universities are located in an area called the University City. Private schools in the city include the International School of Creative Science, Wesgreen International School, Westminster School, Victoria English School, Sharjah Indian School, Sharjah English School, Delta English School, Emirates National School, American Community School Sharjah, Indian School Sharjah, the International School of Choueifat, Sharjah, Sharjah High School, DPS Delhi Private School, Gulf Asian English School, Our Own English High School and the American School of Creative Science.

== Human rights ==
=== LGBTQ rights ===
In addition to the UAE federal laws which criminalize homosexuality, the penal code in Sharjah actively discriminates against LGBTQ individuals. For example, Article 176 of the Sharjah Penal Code (1970) punishes "unnatural crimes (Sodomy)"—defined as "sexual intercourse with another person in contravention of the laws of nature" or "allowing a male to have intercourse with them in contravention of the laws of nature"—with imprisonment up to 10 years. Article 181 establishes that "sexual intercourse" is deemed to have occurred once the sexual organ has entered in the slightest degree, regardless of whether that entry is accompanied by secretion of semen. See also LGBT people and Islam.

== Healthcare ==
Healthcare in Sharjah can be divided into two different sectors, public and private. Public hospitals in the emirates are administered by the government of Sharjah through the Ministry of Health. The emirate also has 9 public medical centers to provide primary health care services.

== Sports ==
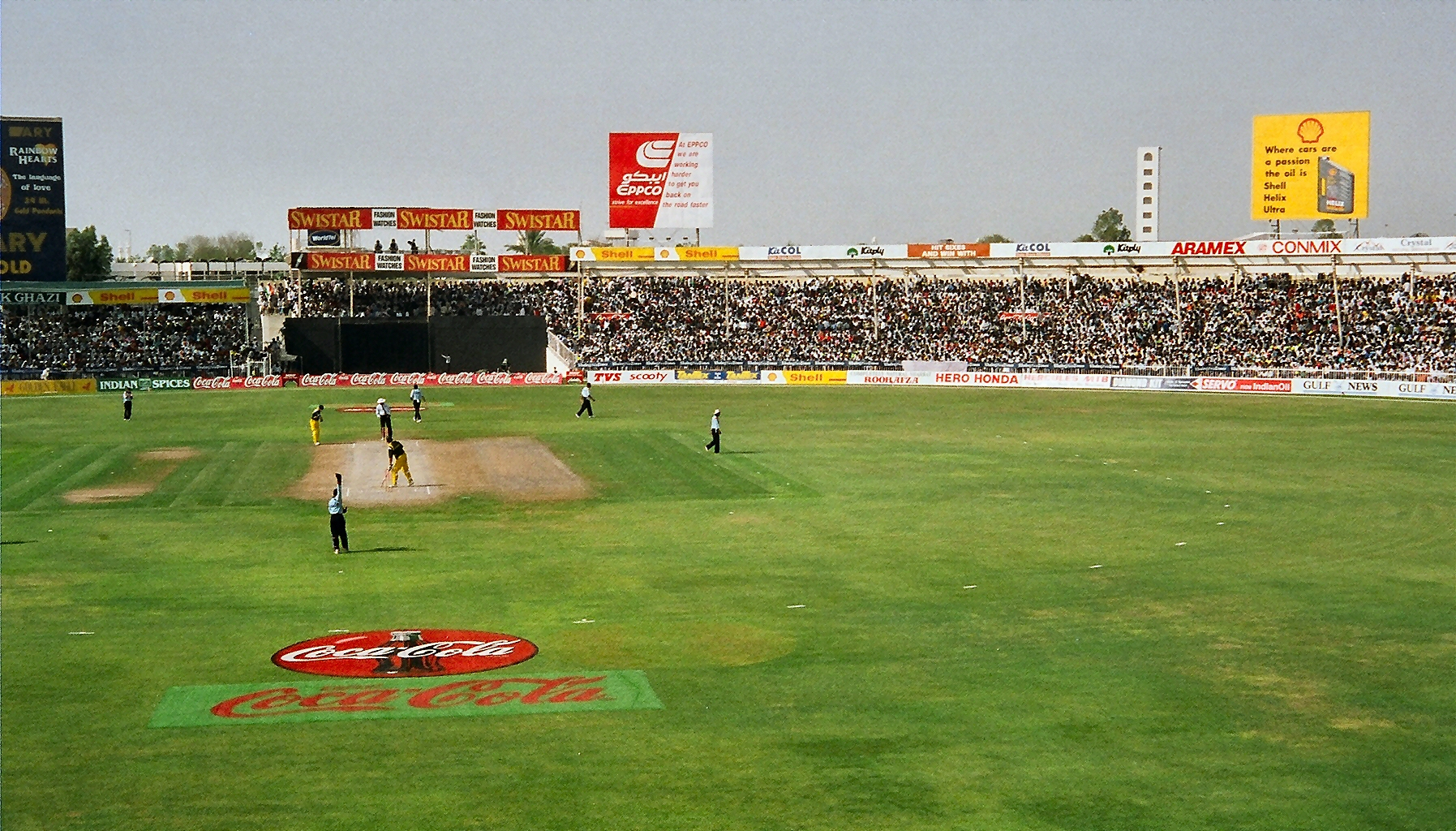
One Day International at Sharjah in 1998 (Australia v India)

The Sharjah Cricket Stadium has hosted almost 238 One Day International cricket matches, which is more than any other ground, and 4 test matches. Sharjah FC plays in the UAE Pro League. Sharjah also has a chess club.

The Sharjah Cricket Stadium was one of the three stadiums to hold 2020 IPL matches.

Sharjah hosts the final round of the Union Internationale Motonautique Formula 1 Powerboat World Championship every year in December. They also have a circuit powerboat team, Sharjah Team. Rusty Wyatt and Filip Roms drive for them in F1. Andrè Faye Solvang won the 2024 UIM F4 World Championship for the team.

== Notable people ==
- Ebtisam AbdulAziz
- Abdulaziz Abdulrahman Almusallam
- Omar Al Ali
- Hussain Ayed
- Emira D'Spain
- Ahmed Khalil
- Shaykha al-Nakhi
- Lubna Khalid Al Qasimi
- Sultan Al-Jasmi
- Sultan bin Muhammad Al-Qasimi
- Asmaa al-Zarouni
- Abdullah bin Salem bin Theban

== Twin towns – sister cities ==
Sharjah is twinned with Granada, Spain.

== Gallery ==
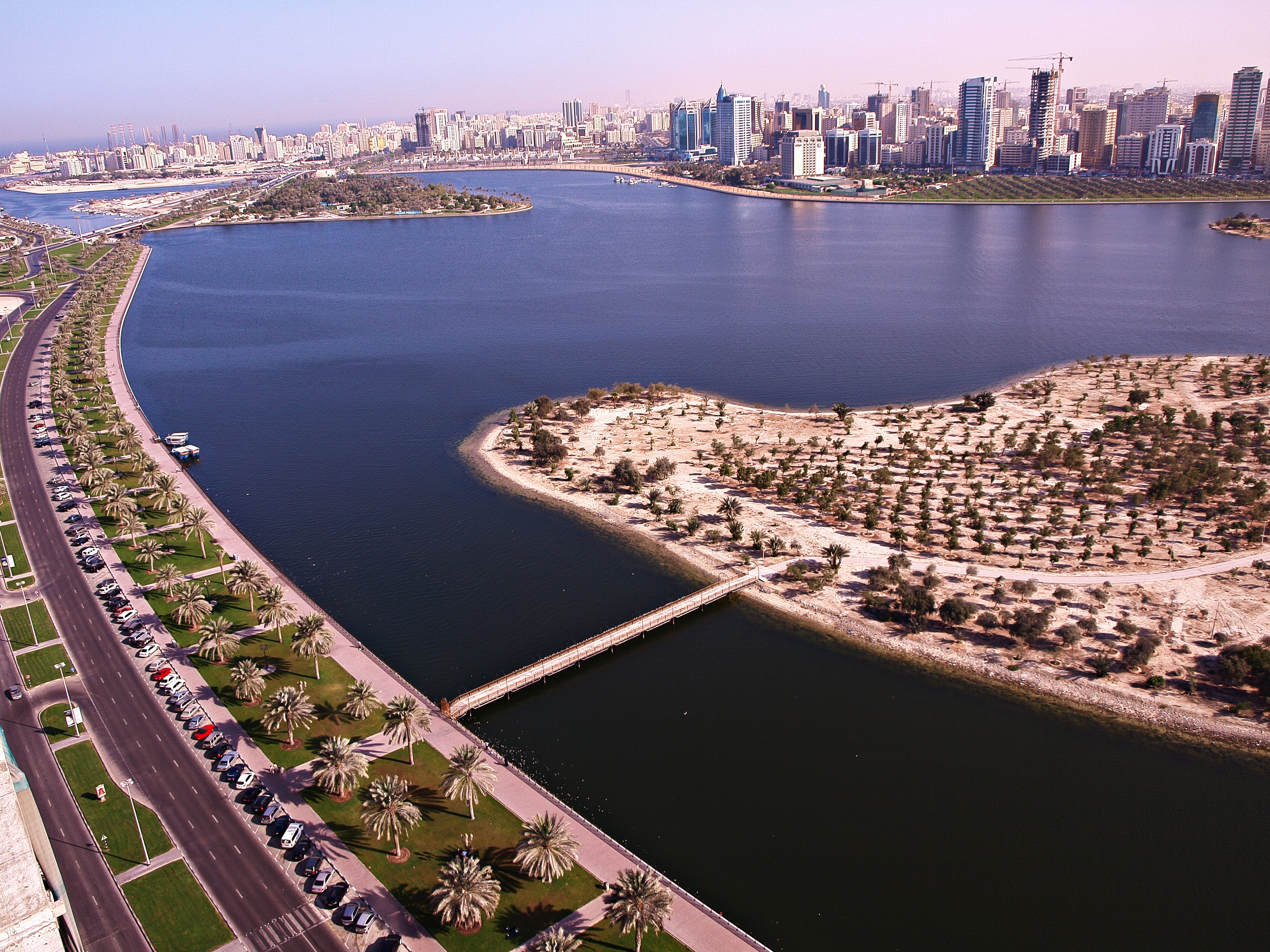
The Buhaira Corniche has numerous upscale hotels. The Sharjah Commerce Tourism Development Authority is also located along the corniche.

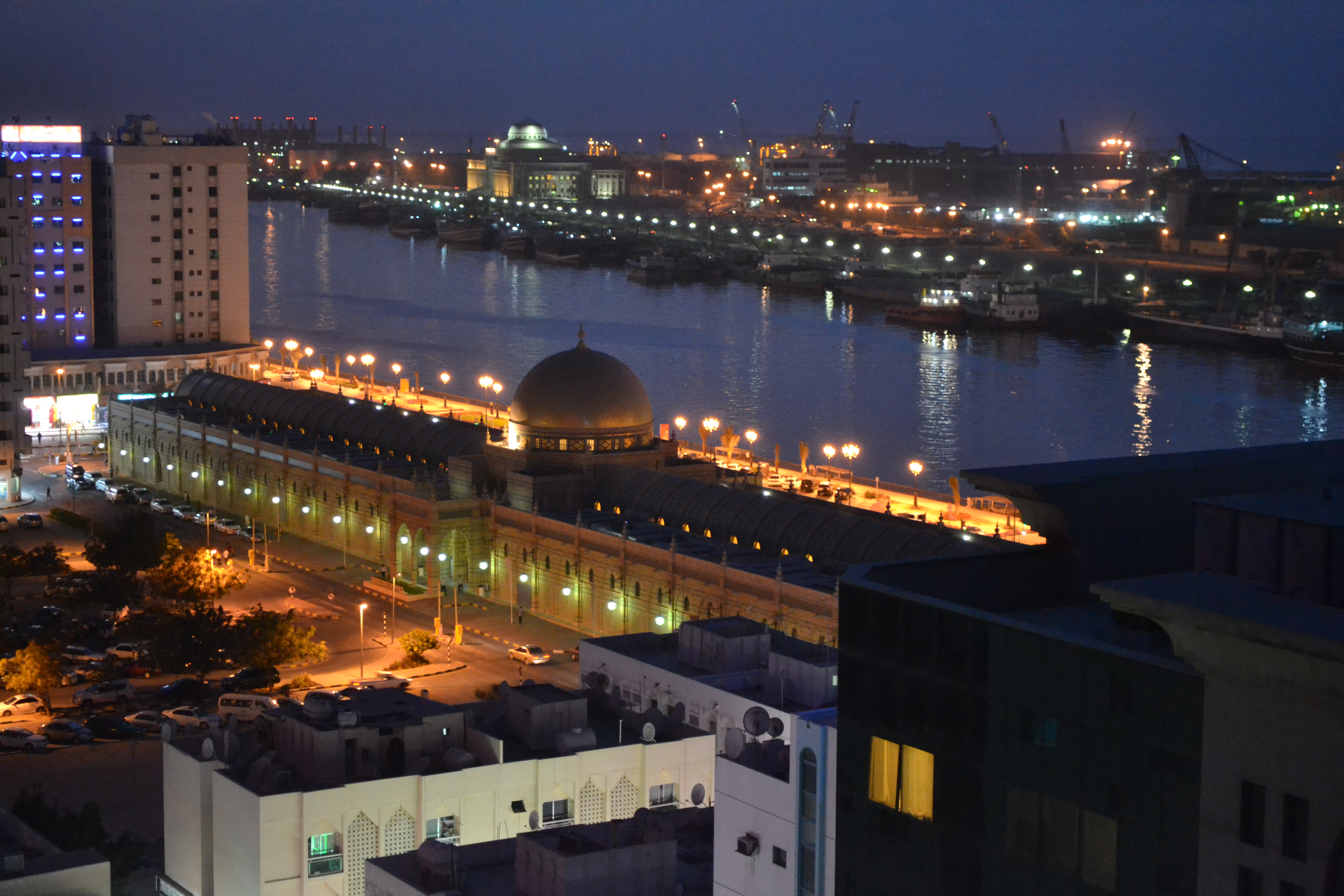
Sharjah Museum of Islamic Civilization, located in Al-Nabba

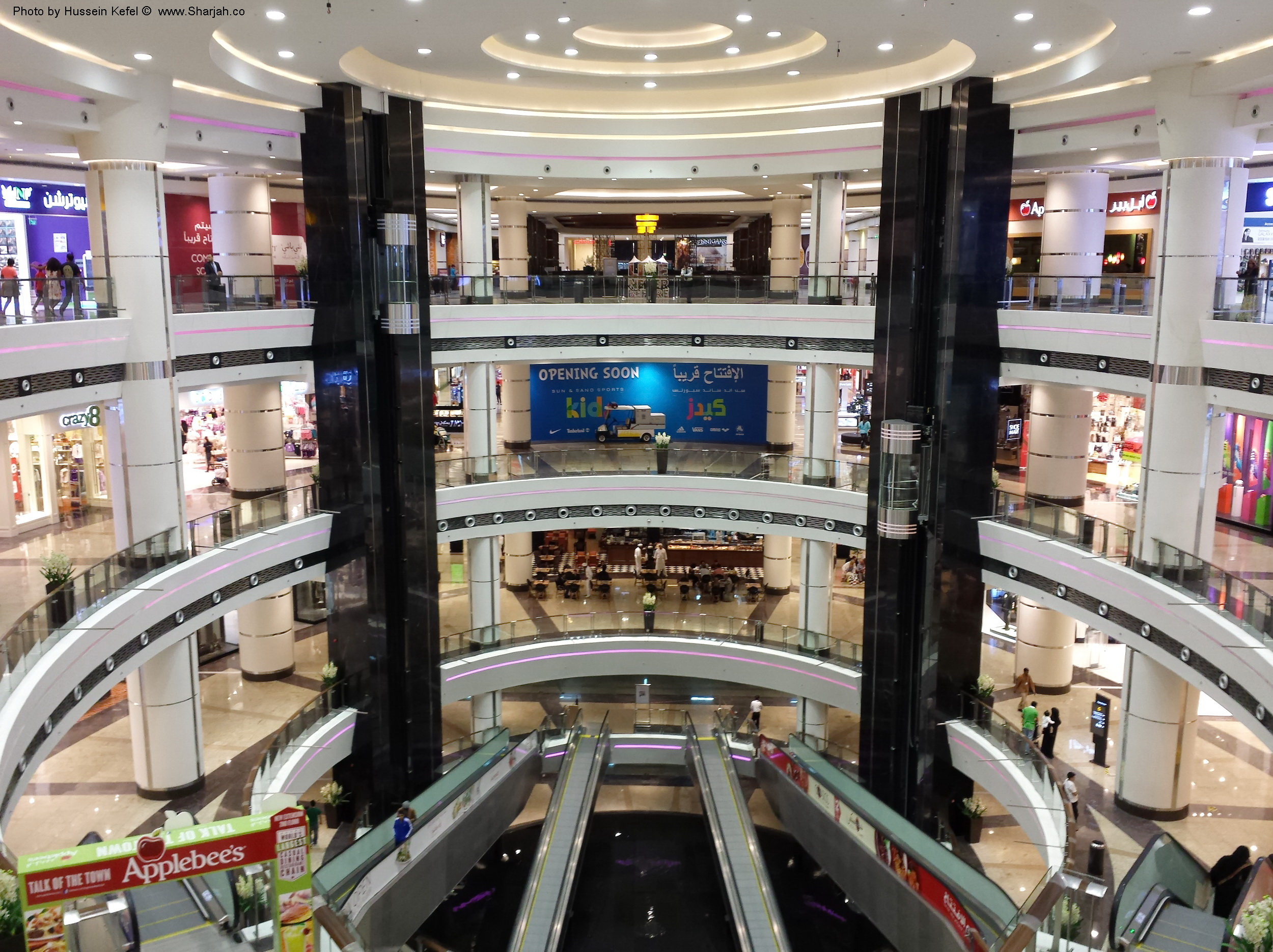
The interior of Sahara Center, one of the biggest malls in Sharjah

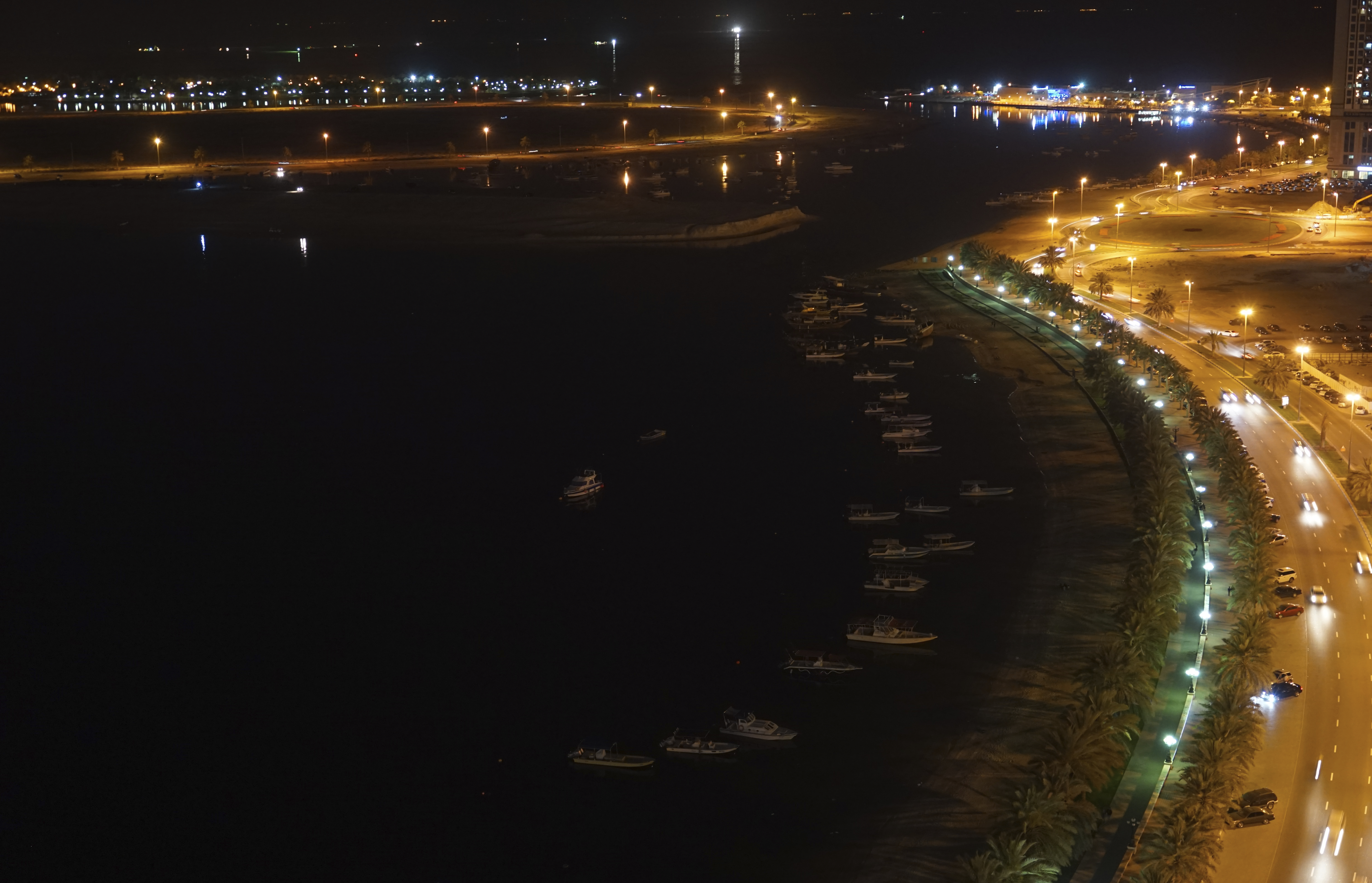
Night view of the boats docked to the east shoreline of Al-Khan Lagoon

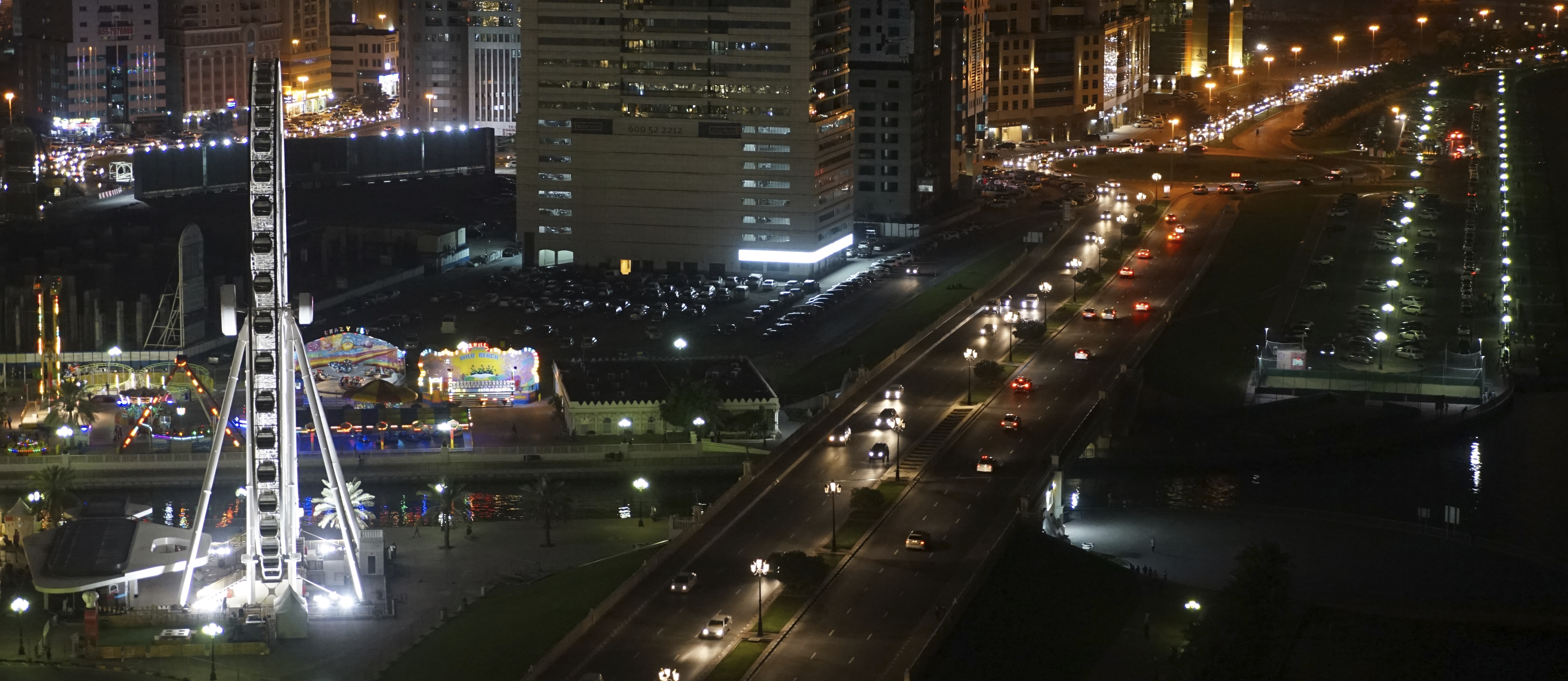
Eye of the Emirates and the Al Qasba Canal by night

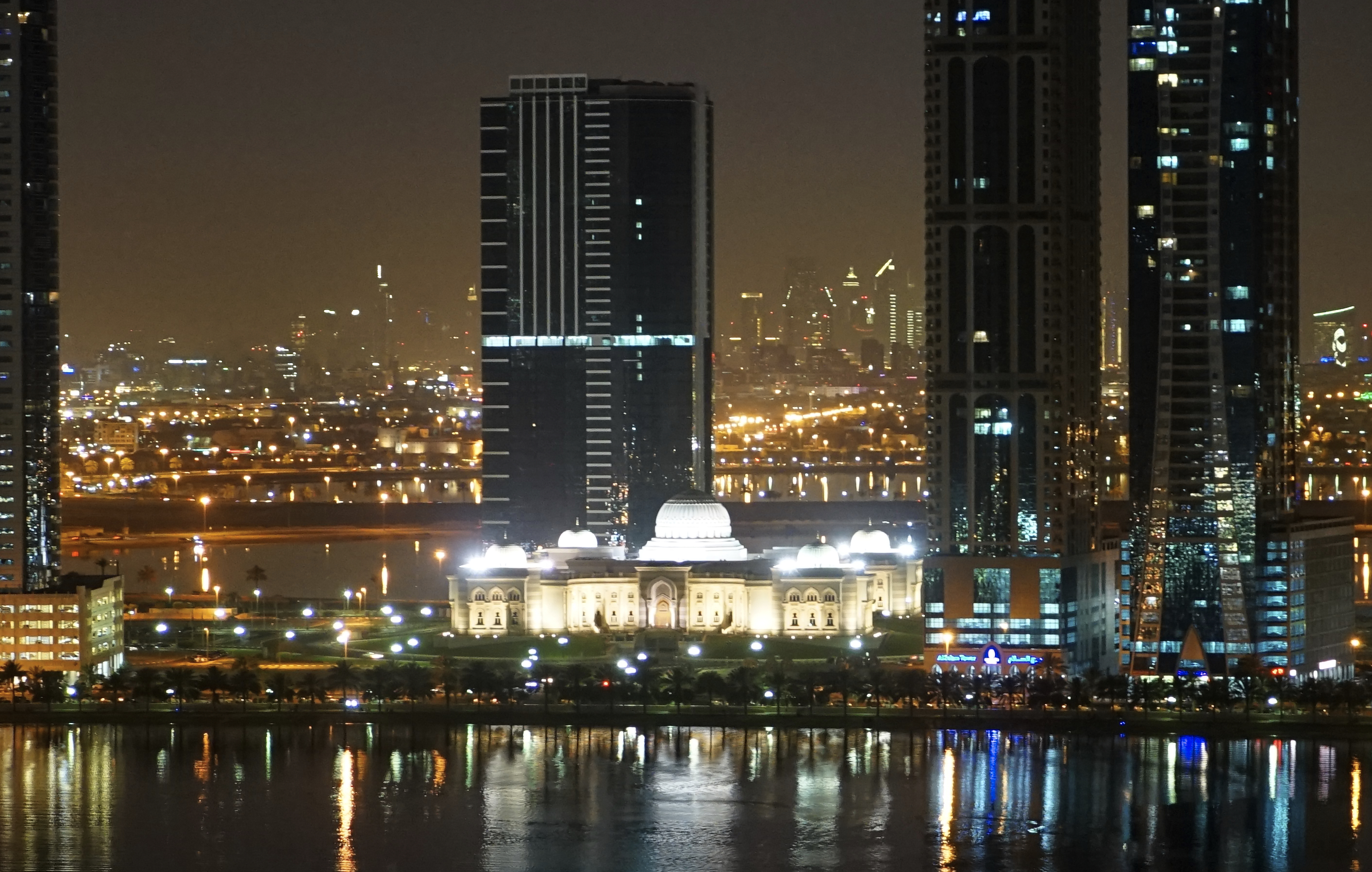
Night view of the New Sharjah Chamber of Commerce

Panoramic view of the Expo Centre Sharjah by night

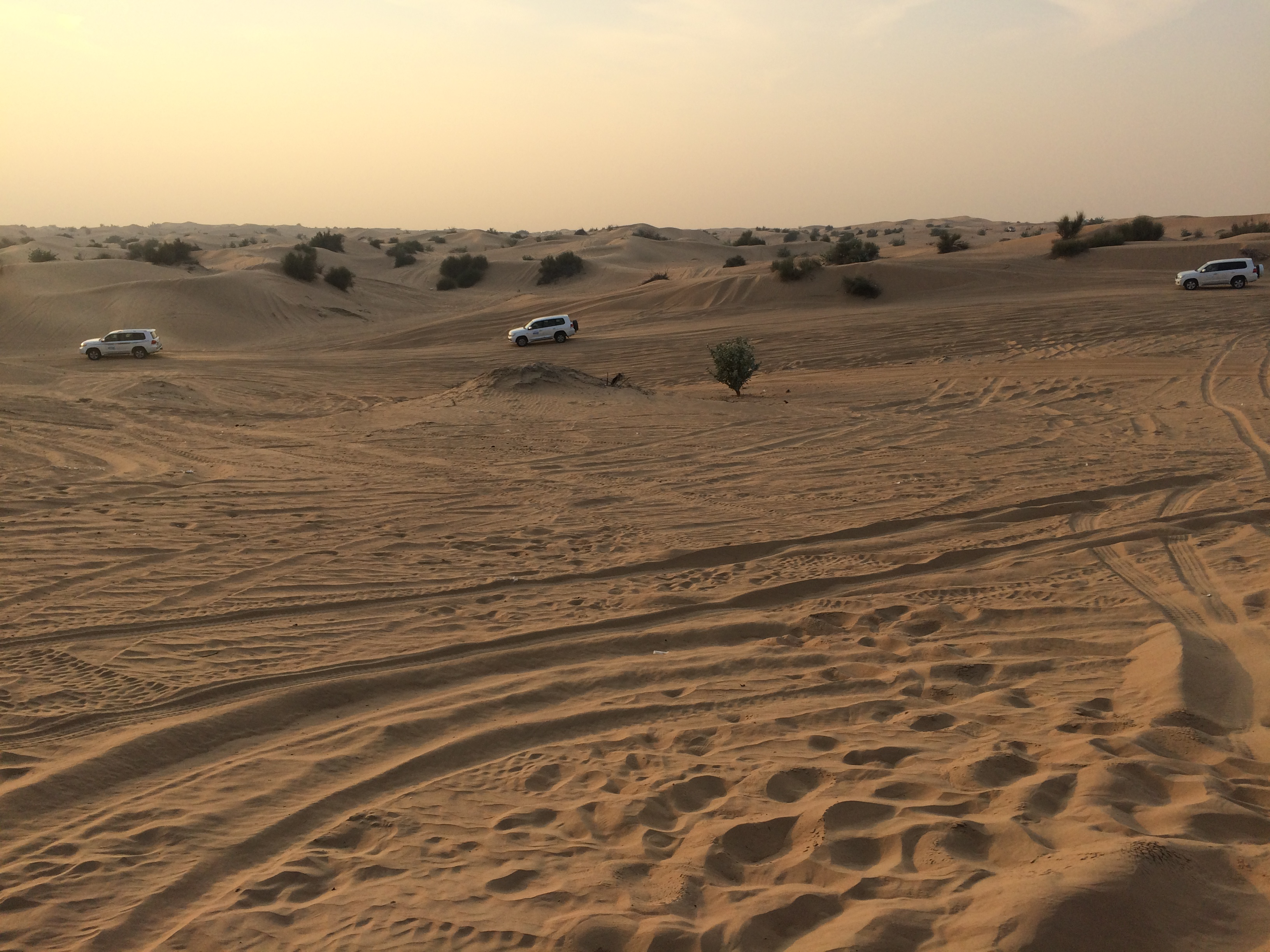
Off-road vehicles in deserts of Sharjah

== See also ==
- Al Heera Beach Sharjah
- Archaeology of the United Arab Emirates
- Sharjah Police Force
- Sharjah Art Foundation
- Hamriyah Port
- Sharjah Museum of Islamic Civilization
- Sharjah Cup
