= Abdullah bin Salem bin Theban =

Emirati poet (1945–2021)

- Born: 1945; Sharjah
- Died: 22-01-2021 (75–76 years old); Dubai United Arab Emirates (1971–2021)
- Occupation: Poet

Abdullah bin Salem bin Theban (Arabic: عبدالله بن سالم بن ذيبان الشامسي) (2021–1945), a popular Emirati poet, was born in Sharjah and grew up an orphan. He started organizing poetry at the age of 16. He worked in the media and joined the armed forces of the United Arab Emirates. He also participated in the preparation of radio and television programs. He is also one of the most prominent poets in the UAE in the 20th century. He died in Dubai at the age of 76.

== His biography ==
Abdullah bin Salem bin Theban was born and raised in Sharjah in 1364 AH/ 1945 AD and he grew up is Sharjah and Dubai. His father died shortly before his birth, and at the age of eight his older brother died, and his uncles nurtured him in Dubai. He memorized the Quran in his childhood and learned English from Sultan bin Mohammed Al-Qasimi, and began poetry at the age of 16. He studied at an industrial school and worked in Qatar before entering a job in his country in the United Arab Emirates until the publication of his first poem in 1968.

At the end of 1963 he joined the armed forces and he got a civilian official job at the Army club. After being tested in English, and he was fluent in Urdu and Persian. The department decided to promote him to the rank of soldier after two years of work.

He then entered the media and participated in the preparation of radio and television programmes, including (Arabic: Al-Galsah Al-Sha’beyah) that broadcast through Dubai Radio and (Arabic: Al-Majlis Al-She’ir) which aired through Dubai TV, which lasted until 2002.

Abdullah bin Salem bin Theban died on the 9th of Jumada II 1442 AH/ 22nd of January 2021, at the age of 76. His death was attributed by the Emirati poets.

== His poetry ==
He wrote his first poem in 1968. He was introduced to poets greater than him and distinguished himself in many poetic aspects, such as flirtation, praise, recording, and national and social poems. He was distinguished by his spontaneous image, the simplicity of his style and his smooth singularity. Ibrahim Al-Mulla from Al-Ittihad newspaper wrote about him "Perhaps his childhood experiences had an impact on his poetic talent, he had a desire to speak of what bothered him. The Prophetic poem was the most important expressive platform in his life and his creative experiences, it was his solace and comfort that helped him overcome all losses."

== Awards and honours ==
He was honoured by Sultan bin Mohammed Al-Qasimi at the Sharjah International Narrator Forum in its 19th edition, as a pioneer of folk poetry in the Emirates.
