= Sultan Al-Jasmi =

Sultan Hamid Al Jasmi (Arabic: سلطان حميد الجسمي; born 1 August 1981) is a writer from the United Arab Emirates. He was born in Sharjah.

== Education ==
Bachelor of International Relations and Diplomacy.
