= Asmaa al-Zarouni =

Emirati librarian and current Librarian of Amani

- أسماء الزرعوني

Librarian of Amani
- Incumbent
- Assumed office September 1, 2019

Deputy Chairperson of the Emirates Writers Association

Personal details
- Born: 1961 (age 64–65) Sharjah

Amani Library
- مكتبة الأماني
- Location: Al Ramla West, Sharjah, United Arab Emirates
- Type: Academic library
- Established: May 1, 2004

Other information
- Parent organization: Amani Missions
- Affiliation: Department of Culture (Sharjah)

Asmaa Ali al-Zarouni (also transliterated as Asma' al-Zar'uni and Asma al-Zarooni, born 1961)(Arabic: أسماء الزرعوني) is an Emirati librarian, poet, short story author, educator, and the Librarian of Amani Library.

== Biography ==
Al-Zarouni is a native of Sharjah, and has a bachelor's degree in education. By profession, she is a librarian. She has served as Deputy Chairperson of the Emirates Writers Association. She has appeared on numerous panels regarding education in her native country.

Some of al-Zarouni's work has been anthologized in English.

Conferences and seminars headed or attended by Asmaa include:

- Emirates Post International Letter Writing Competition (2003)
- International LetterWriting Competition (2006): conducted by Ministry of Education and the Emirates Writers Union.
- 2018 Livre Paris (Paris Book Fair 2018)
