= Sharjah Al Jubail bus station =

Bus station in Sharjah, United Arab Emirates

Al Jubail Bus Station
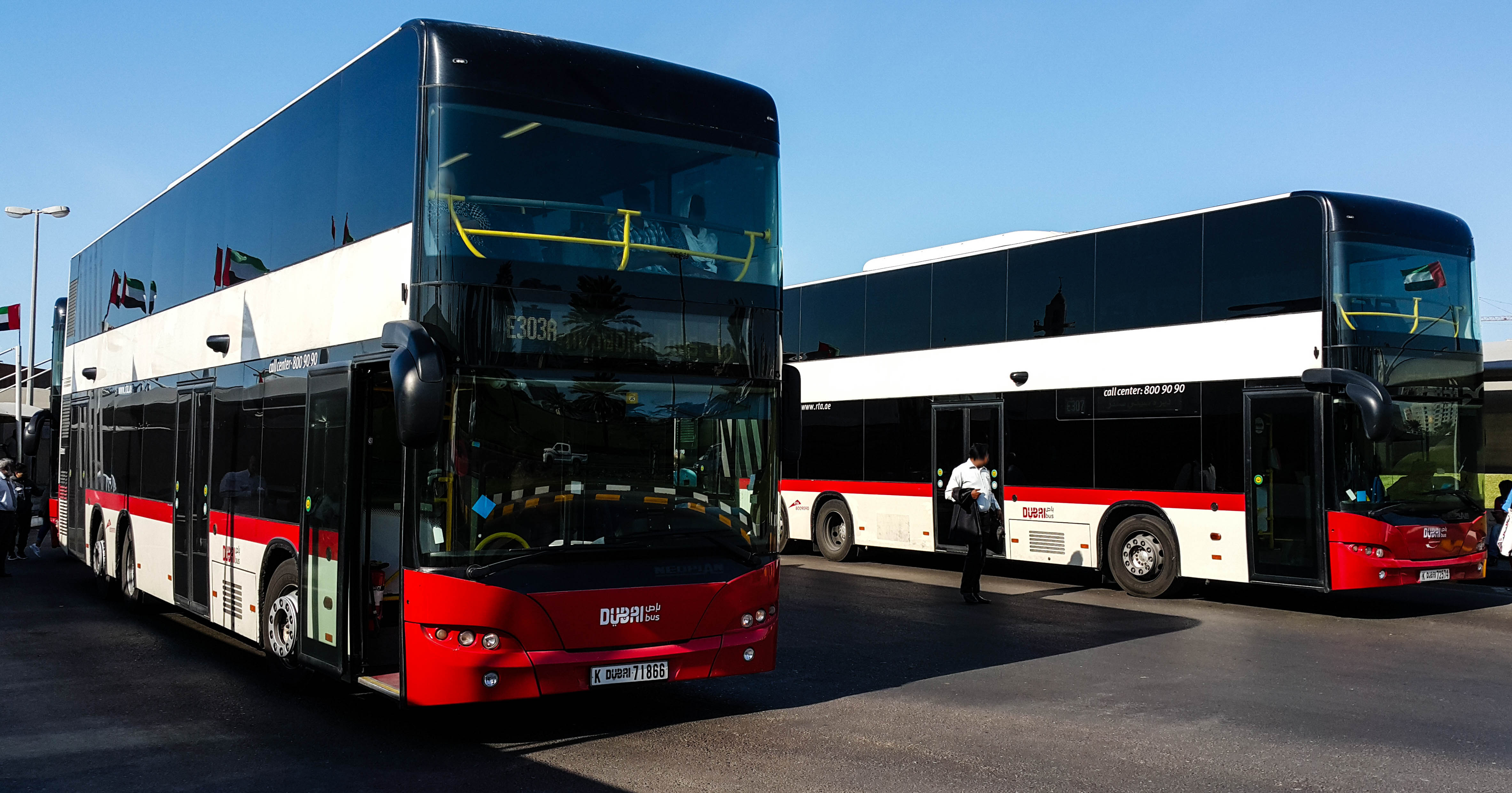
- RTA Double-decker buses at the Al Jubail Bus station

General information
- Location: Sharjah; United Arab Emirates
- Coordinates: 25°21′2″N 55°22′54″E
- System: Bus station International Bus Terminal
- Owner: Roads and Transport Authority (Sharjah)
- Platforms: 10
- Connections: (see below at Service)

Construction
- Structure type: At-grade
- Parking: Yes

Other information
- Station code: E1
Location
- Location within United Arab Emirates Location within Persian Gulf

The Al Jubail Bus Station, also known as the Al Jubail Terminal, is a bus station and International Bus Terminal in Sharjah, United Arab Emirates. It is situated in Al Jubail and adjacent to Downtown Sharjah. It is owned by the Roads and Transport Authority (Sharjah).

With an area of 5 acres, the station is one of the largest in the Emirate of Sharjah. There are two entrances to the bus station, each serving as entrance and exit. The entries are from North Side (Al Jubail Souq), East Side (Sharjah Blue Souk) and two on South Side (in front of Sharjah Rolla-Beach Road).

== Platforms ==
Platforms	Buses
1	Abu Dhabi
2	Dubai
3	Ajman
4	Fujairah
5	Ras Al Khaimah
6	Umm Al Quwain
7	Muscat, Oman

== Services ==
Al Jubail Terminal mainly serves city, intercity, and international passengers. The RTA of Dubai serves intercity routes between Dubai’s Al Ghubaiba, Deira City Centre and Union Bus Stations to Al Jubail. While SRTA serves the intercity routes between Mall of the Emirates, Dubai Int’l Airport, and Centrepoint stations.

Bus Code	Terminus
1	Sahara Mall
3	Safari Mall
8	Sahara Mall
9	Sahara Mall
14	Sharjah Airport Terminal
14X	Al Muwaileh Terminal
15	Sharjah Airport Terminal
77	Al Saja'a Terminal
88	Al Saja'a Terminal
99	Sharjah Airport Terminal

=== International Service ===
International Bus serves the countries of United Arab Emirates and Oman (Sharjah - Muscat)

Bus Code	Terminus	Departure time
203	Azaiba Bus Station (Muscat, Oman)	6:00am 4:00pm
