= Sharjah Industrial area =

Sharjah Industrial Area الشارقة الـصَّـنـاعـيّـة
- Community and Industrial Sector
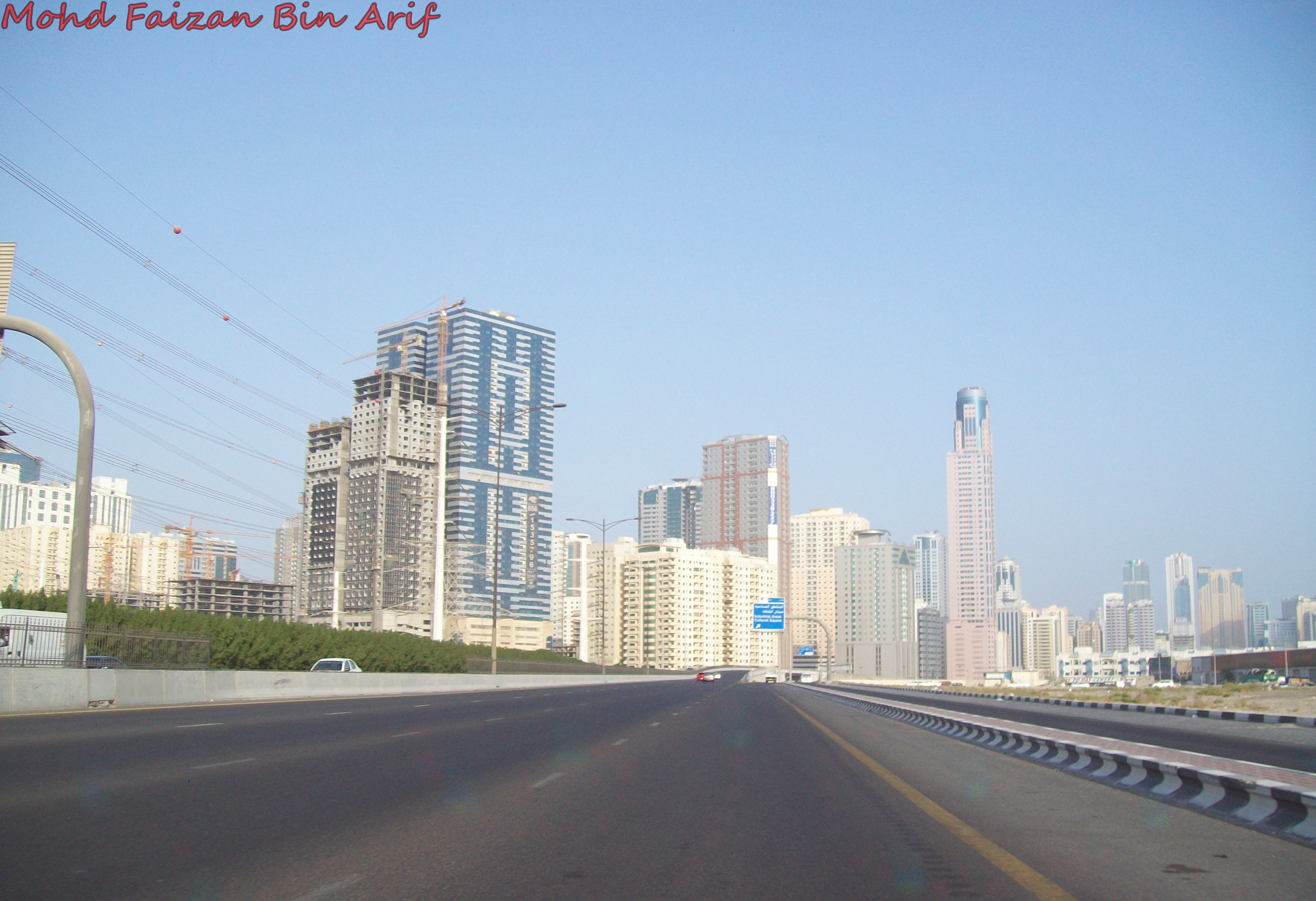
- Ring road Sharjah Industrial Area 8
- Interactive map of Sharjah Industrial Area
- Coordinates: 25.3094506°N 55.4246271°E
- Country: United Arab Emirates
- Emirate: Sharjah
- Industrial City: Sharjah

Area
  - Total: 33.58 km^{2} (12.97 sq mi)

Population (2000)
  - Total: 80,685
  - Density: 2,403/km^{2} (6,223/sq mi)

Sharjah Industrial Area (Arabic: الشارقة الـصَّـنـاعـيّـة) is a locality in Sharjah, the United Arab Emirates. Sharjah Industrial Area comprises 18 sub-localities that contribute to more than 48% of the UAE's gross industrial output.

== Sharjah Industrial Areas ==
Industrial Area Sharjah divided into 18 industrial areas plays a pivotal role in the economic growth and development of the Emirate of Sharjah.

=== Sharjah Industrial Area 1 ===
Sharjah Industrial Area 1 is one of the biggest sub-communities and Industrial Sector that is served by Maliha Road (S112) on one side and Al Wahda Street on the other. Seen here residential and commercial properties including apartments, offices, warehouses and retail shops in Sharjah Industrial Area 1. is situated close to the Sharjah – Dubai border

=== Sharjah Industrial Area 2 ===
Sharjah Industrial Area 2 located in Close to Downtown Sharjah, Industrial Area 2 is served by Maliha Road, Al Khan Street, Second Industrial Street and First Industrial Street.

=== Sharjah Industrial Area 3 ===
Industrial Area 3 is a part of the Industrial Area in Sharjah. There are 18 Industrial area including Industrial Area 3 Sharjah. It is located near Maliha Road, Third Industrial Street, Al Khan Street and Second Industrial Street. As it is a mixed-use area that features apartments, shops, factories and warehouses,

- Places of interest
1. Al Khan Beach.
2. Sahara Centre
3. City Centre Sharjah

=== Sharjah Industrial Area 4 ===
Industrial Area 4 in Sharjah is a major commercial and industrial hub, located near to the Sharjah – Dubai border. It part of 18 industrial zones Sharjah, Industrial Area 4 is one of the sub-districts in the industrial zone surrounded by Abu Shagara and Bu Daniq to the west, Al Ghubaiba to the north, Industrial Area 5 to the east and Industrial Area 1 to the south.

- Places of interest
1. Al Wahda Street

=== Sharjah Industrial Area 5 ===
Industrial Area 5, one of the largest industrial areas in the UAE, is located in Sharjah. Industrial Area 5 is one part of the larger Industrial Area Sharjah and its most popular community. It mainly houses government facilities including Sharjah Electricity and Water Authority, Sharjah Water Treatment Plant, Sharjah Municipality and Sharjah Municipality Centers Department. Moreover, it is home to Sharjah Cricket Stadium, Sharjah Football Stadium and Sharjah Sports Club. Industrial Area 5 located in bound by Maliha Road (S112) from the south which connects with a major network of roads in Sharjah. Roads like Al Wahda Street (E11) and E 311 road (United Arab Emirates) are easily accessible from the area and since its part of Industrial Area Sharjah, which is right next to the Dubai border, workers in the area can easily commute to the other emirate. Sharjah Industrial Area 5 also offers easy access to the Halwan Suburb, which is largely a residential area of the Sharjah

- Places of interest
1. Sharjah Cricket Stadium
2. Sharjah Football Stadium
3. Sharjah Sports Club.
4. Power Sign Sharjah
5. Sharjah Water Treatment Plant
6. Sharjah Electricity and Water Authority

=== Sharjah Industrial Area 6 ===
Industrial Area 6 is The central commercial area of Sharjah, Industrial Area, is located close to the Sharjah Industrial Area 5 It is bounded by University City Road (S120) from the north and Maliha Road (S112) from the south. Sharjah Graveyard is a famous landmark in Sharjah Industrial Area 6.

- Places of interest
1. Sharjah Graveyard

=== Sharjah Industrial Area 10 ===
Industrial Area 7 is key of commercial area in Sharjah. Industrial Area 7 is one of its sub-districts located close to the Al Nahda Sharjah and border shared with Dubai.

- Places of interest
1. Safeer Mall Sharjah

=== Sharjah Industrial Area 8 ===
Sharjah Industrial Area 8 is one of the industrial areas and sub-communities in Sharjah. Industrial Area 7 set on the Dubai – Sharjah border. The mixed-use district is home to auto parts stores, used cars and furniture shops and a school. It shares a border with Al Qusais Industrial Area 3. Connectivity through Sharjah Ring Road.

- Places of interest
1. Al Durrah International School

=== Sharjah Industrial Area 9 ===
Sharjah Industrial Area 9 is one of the industrial areas and sub-communities in Sharjah. The Industrial area is located at the intersection of Beirut Street and Sharjah Ring Road. This area is a vacant area, construction work is going on, now this area is used for parking and resting for heavy trucks and it is a rest area for trucks carrying large containers.

- Places of interest
1. Heavy vehicle parking lots
2. Trucks rest area

=== Sharjah Industrial Area 10 ===
Sharjah Industrial Area 10 is one of the commercial area in the Sharjah Industrial Area. It is bound by Maliha Road, Third Industrial Street and Fourth Industrial Street . The area is situated between Industrial Area 3 and Industrial Area 11 and is canter of to many industrial lands, warehouses, factories and labour camps. An important police station (Industrial Area Police Station) in the industrial area is located in this area.

- Places of interest
1. Industrial Area Police Station

=== Sharjah Industrial Area 11 ===
Sharjah Industrial Area 11 is a commercial district and Industrial Area in Sharjah. It is part of the sharjah industrial area located near Industrial Area 10, is bound by Maliha Road and Sheikh Mohammed Bin Zayed Road(E311). Sharjah's One of the biggest road bridge National Paints Bridge is located in this area.

- Places of interest
1. National Paints Bridge
2. Bin Laden Signal Sharjah (Traffic Signal)
3. Binladin Workshop

=== Sharjah Industrial Area 12 ===
Sharjah Industrial Industrial Area is an industrial area in Sharjah. It is bound by the side of Maliha Road. The industrial area is also connected to popular roads like Sheikh Khalifa Bin Zayed Al Nahyan Road, Maliha Road and the Sharjah-Dubai (S102) highway.

=== Sharjah Industrial Area 13 ===
Industrial Area 13 is one of the industrial areas in the Sharjah Industrial Area. Located close to the Sharjah – Dubai border, Industrial Area 13, Sharjah is one of the few larger communities around here located on the other side of Maliha Road. It is bound by Sheikh Mohammed Bin Zayed Road E311 on one side. The area is situated between Muwaileh Commercial. Many engineering, construction materials and trading companies are settled in Industrial Area 13. One of the world's most congested roads passes through this area, one of the most congested roads in the UAE. National Paint Bridge is a gate on the Ajman-Sharjah-Dubai route. The headquarters of National Paints, the largest paint company in the U A E, is located here and hence is locally referred to by this name.

- Places of interest
1. National Paint HQ
2. National Paints Bridge
3. Muwaileh Commercial
4. Sheikh Mohammed Bin Zayed Road E311

=== Sharjah Industrial Area 14 ===
Industrial Area 14 is one of the Industrial Area in the Sharjah Industrial Area. also known as Muwaileh Commercial, The northern border of this community has direct access to Sheikh Mohammed Bin Zayed Road E311 – a highway that connects seven emirates of the UAE, while Maliha Road runs along the east of this area. To its south lies Industrial Area 15 and 17, while University City of Sharjah lies to the south of Muwaileh Commercial.

- Places of interest
1. Muwaileh Commercial

=== Sharjah Industrial Area 15 ===
Industrial Area 15 is one of the small industrial area in Sharjah Industrial Area. Industrial Area is a major commercial center in the emirate near the Sharjah-Dubai border.

- Places of interest
1. Al Shams Medical Center

=== Sharjah Industrial Area 16 ===
Industrial Area 16 is one of the Industrial Area in the Sharjah Industrial Area.

=== Sharjah Industrial Area 17 ===
Industrial Area 17 is one of the Industrial Area in the Sharjah Industrial Area.

- Places of interest
1. Safeer Market

=== Sharjah Industrial Area 18 ===
Sharjah Industrial Area 18 is one of the sub-communities of Sharjah Industrial Area. It is situated between Emirates Road (E611) and Sheikh Mohammed Bin Zayed Road E311 while Mleiha Road runs along with the community.

== Al Sajaa Industrial Area ==
Sajaa Industrial Area is one of the Industrial Area in the Sharjah Industrial Area. It is part of the 14 million square feet industrial area in the Sharjah city, the largest in the UAE. mixed-use and retail space is added to the area, which initially had 300+ industrial units. It is close to Sharjah International Airport, Al Hamriya Port and Free Zone and the main road which makes it well-connected to the West coast of the UAE.

- Places of interest
1. Al Hadiba
2. Al Sajaa
