= Al Qasba Sharjah =

Residential area and Canal side in Sharjah, UAE

Al Qasba Sharjah القصباء - الشارقة
- Residential area Cultural area
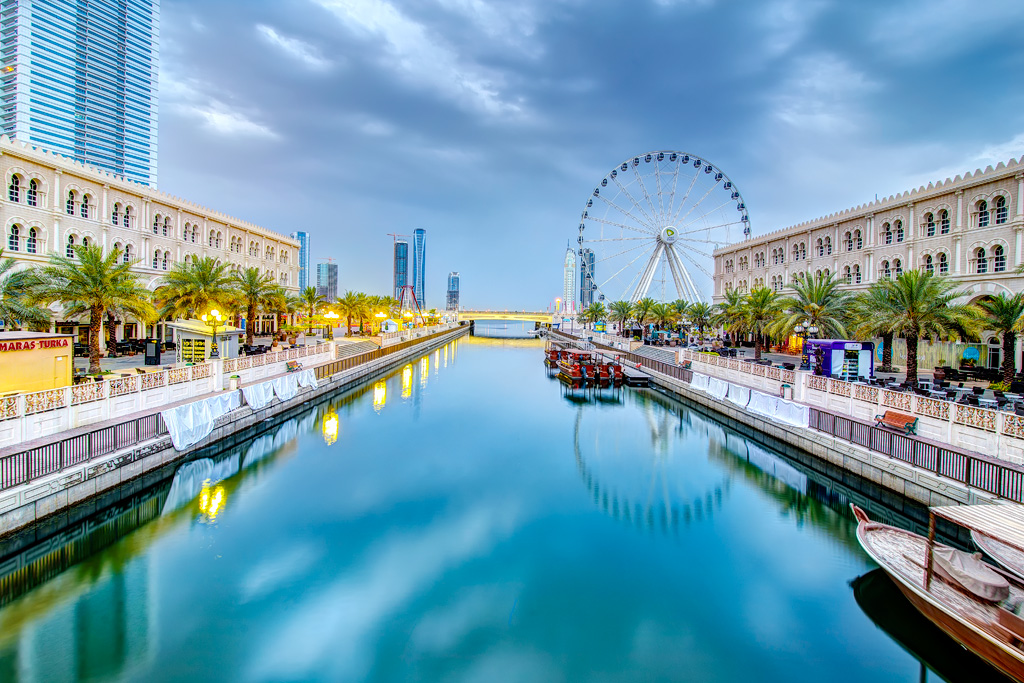
- Al Qasba Canal view

- Location within United Arab Emirates
- Coordinates: 25.3222849°N 55.3738399°E
- Country: United Arab Emirates
- Emirate: Sharjah
- City: Sharjah
- Established: 2000

Area
  - Total: 1.36 km^{2} (0.53 sq mi)

Population (expected)
  - Total: 50,000
  - Density: 37,000/km^{2} (95,000/sq mi)

Al Qasba Sharjah (Arabic: القصباء - الشارقة), also known as Al Qasba Canal, residential community, canal side, cultural area and Waterfront in Sharjah, United Arab Emirates.

== Location ==
Al Qasba is located south of Downtown Sharjah, near the Al Majaz District, with Al Khan Corniche Street serving as a boundary. The central feature of the development is a canal with pedestrian-friendly walkways.

== Nearby attractions ==
- Downtown Sharjah
- Rolla Sharjah
- Abu Shagara
