= Sharjah Investment and Development Authority =

The Sharjah Investment and Development Authority, also known as Shurooq, is responsible for the development of the Emirate of Sharjah, one of the seven emirates of the United Arab Emirates (UAE) as an investment, tourism, and business destination.

== History ==
Shurooq was established by Amiri decree in 2009. In its first decade of operations, Shurooq built a portfolio of completed and ongoing projects comprising $2 billion, with a total area of 11.74 million square metres. Its key projects include Al Noor Island, Flag Island, Al Qasba, Al Majaz Waterfront, Al Montazah Amusement and Water Park, Mleiha Archeological Center, Heart of Sharjah (including the $27 million Al Bait Hotel), and the establishment of the City Sightseeing Bus Tour. Other hotel developments include the Al Badayer Lodge and Al Faya Lodge (formerly known as Fossil Rock Lodge) projects. All three of Shurooq's luxury lodge projects (the third is Kalba's Kingfisher Lodge) are managed by Mantis Hotels, a joint venture between Shurooq and Mantis Hospitality.

In 2014, Shurooq announced a $137 million hotel and leisure development on the island of Sir bu Nair, 65 km offshore in the Persian Gulf. To include a 60-room hotel, a museum, a residential village, an amphitheatre, education centre, mosque, harbour, retail outlets and an airport, the development was to open in 2017, but remains a work in progress.

In May 2018, Shurooq's CEO, Marwan bin Jassim Al Serkal, was promoted to executive chairman of the group. In September 2018, Shurooq combined with Injazat to launch the Sharjah Investors Services Centre, a 'one stop shop' for investors.

In January 2018, Shurooq signed a deal with Eagle Hills Properties to develop a 2.7-billion dirhams luxury hospitality project in the region. In July 2018, Shurooq signed a deal with BESIX to operate and expand the capacity of a wastewater treatment plant in the Al Saja’a area of Sharjah.

The company signed up to the United Nations's Women's Empowerment Principles in September 2021, an initiative to support women in the workplace established by UN Global Compact and UN Women.

== Company ==
Shurooq drives and regulates investment in the development of Sharjah's infrastructure in order to attract foreign direct investment (FDI), tourism and business opportunities for both local and foreign interests. It is both an investor in master-planned projects and a developer of infrastructure designed to attract investment. Its remit includes the regulation of investment in Sharjah, granting permits for investment projects as well as coordination with government departments to foster investment and development. It is also mandated to propose and draft new legislation concerning the development of investment and business opportunities in Sharjah, as well as developing, managing and operating projects both inside and outside the emirate.

A key element of Shurooq's portfolio is based around the development of tourism and heritage projects, including hotel, retail, commercial, and residential developments. The sector is set to build revenues of some $300 million by 2020. Shurooq's projects span the city of Sharjah as well as the inland areas of Al Badayer and Mileiha and the east coast cities of Kalba and Khor Fakkan.

== Projects ==
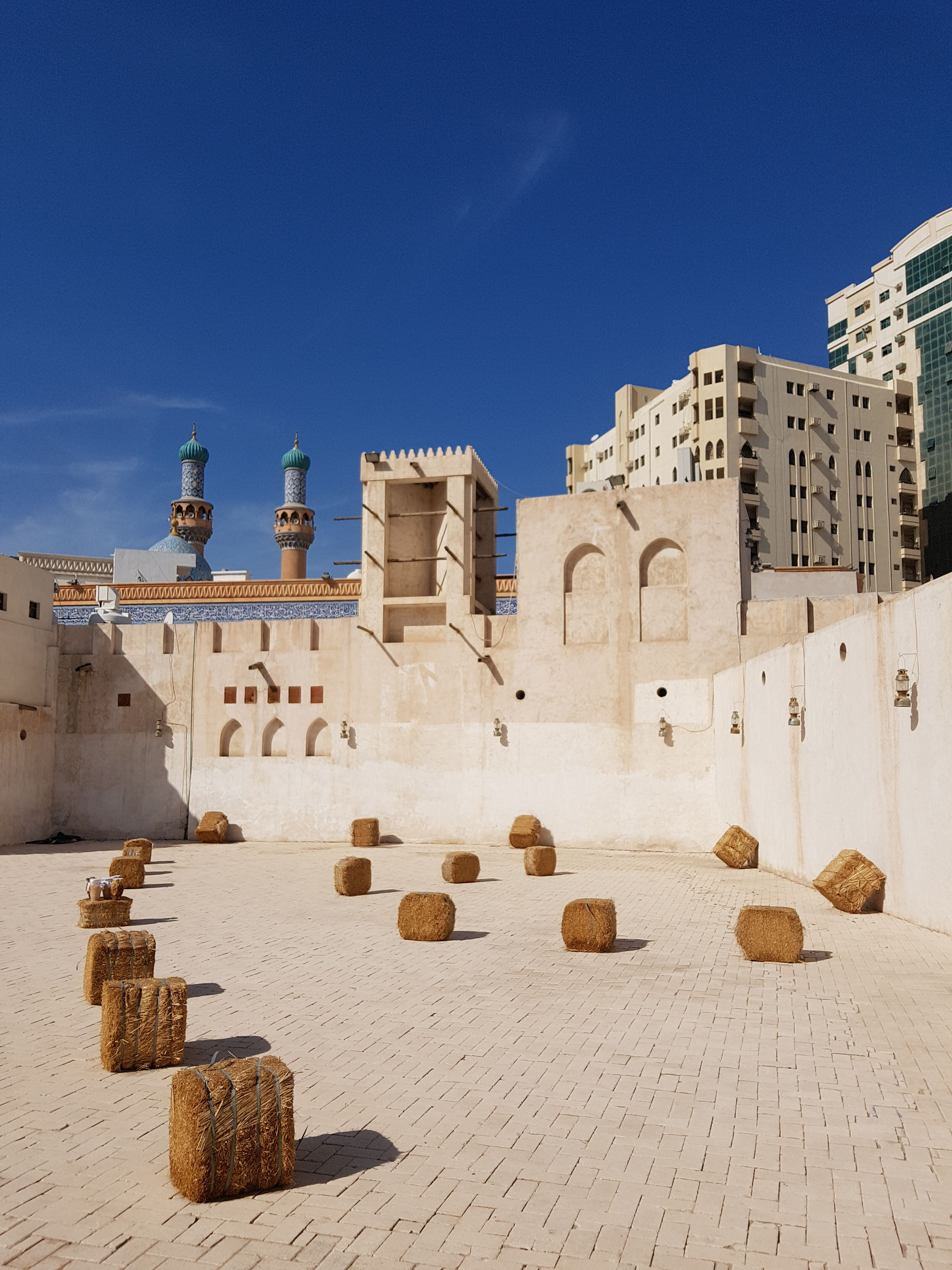
The Heart of Sharjah restoration project

- Al Badayer Oasis: Located between the village of Nazwa and Al Madam on the E44 highway, Al Badayer (known as the location of the 'Big Red' sand dune), Al Badayer Oasis is a 24,000 square metre mixed-use leisure development with 'glamping' facilities, a visitor centre, shops, cafes and event spaces. The project is due for completion in 2019, having had an original opening date scheduled in 2017. The project has been valued at $16.5 million.
- Flag Island: Sharjah City's Flag Island is one of a number of Shurooq developments built around the UAE flag – others include Flaq Squares in the Sharjah towns of Kalba, Khor Fakkan, Dhaid and Dibba. Flag Island flew the world's largest flag from a fixed flagpole in 2017 and comprises a 1,000-seat amphitheatre, the 1971 Design Space, a Jones the Grocer restaurant and a number of food trucks. Its flagpole, at 123 metres, is the 7th highest in the world. It is home to a number of events throughout the year, including the Sharjah Run.
- Heart of Sharjah: The Heart of Sharjah is a cultural heritage project that aims to preserve and restore the old town of Sharjah and return it to its 1950s state. A five-phase project intended for completion in 2025, the project is being undertaken by Shurooq, together with Sharjah Institute for Heritage, the Sharjah Museums Authority, and the Sharjah Art Foundation.
- Kalba: A number of projects are underway in and around Sharjah's east coast city of Kalba, including the Al Hefaiyah Conservation Centre and the Kingfisher Lodges. Opened in 2015, the Conservation Centre is a 12 square kilometre wildlife sanctuary and visitor centre, with some 30 species preserved at the Centre including Arabian Leopards, thought to now be extinct in the wild in the United Arab Emirates. The Kingfisher Lodges are 20 luxury tented lodges with plunge pools located on the shore near the Kalba mangroves. An eco-tourism and conservation project are also planned at Kalba. Kalba was developed in 2018 by an engineer Wael Al-Masri, the development value is 160 million AED over an area of 17,000 square meters and includes a rental area of 11,200 square meters.
- Khor Fakkan: The $95 million Chedi Khor Fakkan was first announced in 2011 with a launch date of 2015 and remains to be completed as at 2018. A number of development projects have taken place on Khor Fakkan's Corniche, the latest of which is a mixed-use upgrade of the entire length of the Corniche by Shurooq.
- Al Majaz Waterfront: Shurooq's inaugural project, the $30 million Al Majaz Waterfront overlooks Sharjah's Khalid Lagoon and comprises leisure and retail developments, including a mini-golf course, splash park, children's recreation centre and a waterfront jogging track. Features include regular fountain and laser shows.
- Al Montazah Water Park: The 126,000 square metre water park was re-opened in 2018 following development and restoration work. Previously known as Al Jazeera Park, Montazah Park was expanded to accommodate 7,000 guests at the water park and 10,000 visitors at the connected amusement park.
- Maryam Island: In January 2018, Shurooq announced a partnership with Abu Dhabi-based Eagle Hills Properties to develop Maryam Island, Kalba Waterfront, and Palace Al Khan. The three projects were valued at $734 million, with Maryam Island, the largest of the projects, valued at Dh2.4bn and comprising some 460,000 square metres. The project includes 600 rooms of hotel accommodation, 1,890 apartments and a hundred retail and hospitality outlets. It is scheduled for completion in 2019.
- Mleiha: The Mleiha Archaeological Centre was opened in January 2016. The visitor centre includes displays of artefacts from the Umm Al Nar and Iron Ages of the UAE, as well as important evidence of the emergence of humankind from Africa, 125,000 years ago. The multi-phase eco-tourism development is intended in future to comprise accommodation, a campsite and an astronomical observatory, with a total investment of UAE Dhs 250 million. It will also include the development of a 450 km desert park. The accommodation project is to launch as the Al Faya Lodge, a luxury hotel and spa.
- Al Noor Island: Inaugurated in December 2015, Al Noor Island is a 45,470 square metre development, comprising some 3,500 metres of walkway linking quiet areas, a sculpture park, playground and butterfly house, reached from Sharjah's Buheirah Corniche by a footbridge near the Al Noor mosque. The butterfly collection comprises some 500 species of Asian butterflies.
- Al Qasba: Home to Shurooq's offices, the Al Qasba waterfront development connects the Khalid Lagoon with the sea at Al Mamzar and consists of some 20 retail and hospitality outlets, as well as the Al Maraya Art Centre. In April 2018, Shurooq signed an agreement with Dubai-based developer and hotel management company Emaar to operate a 100-room luxury Vida Hotel at Al Qasba.
- Rahmaniya: In April 2018, Shurooq announced a joint venture with Dubai-based master developer Nakheel, which would invest some $20.5 million in the development of a retail and leisure centre in Sharjah's Al Rahmaniya neighbourhood.
- The House of Wisdom project reimagines libraries for the 21st century, and is scheduled for public opening in April 2020.
