= Russian Orthodox Church, Sharjah =

Russian Orthodox Church in Sharjah, UAE

- St. Philip the Apostle Russian Orthodox Church
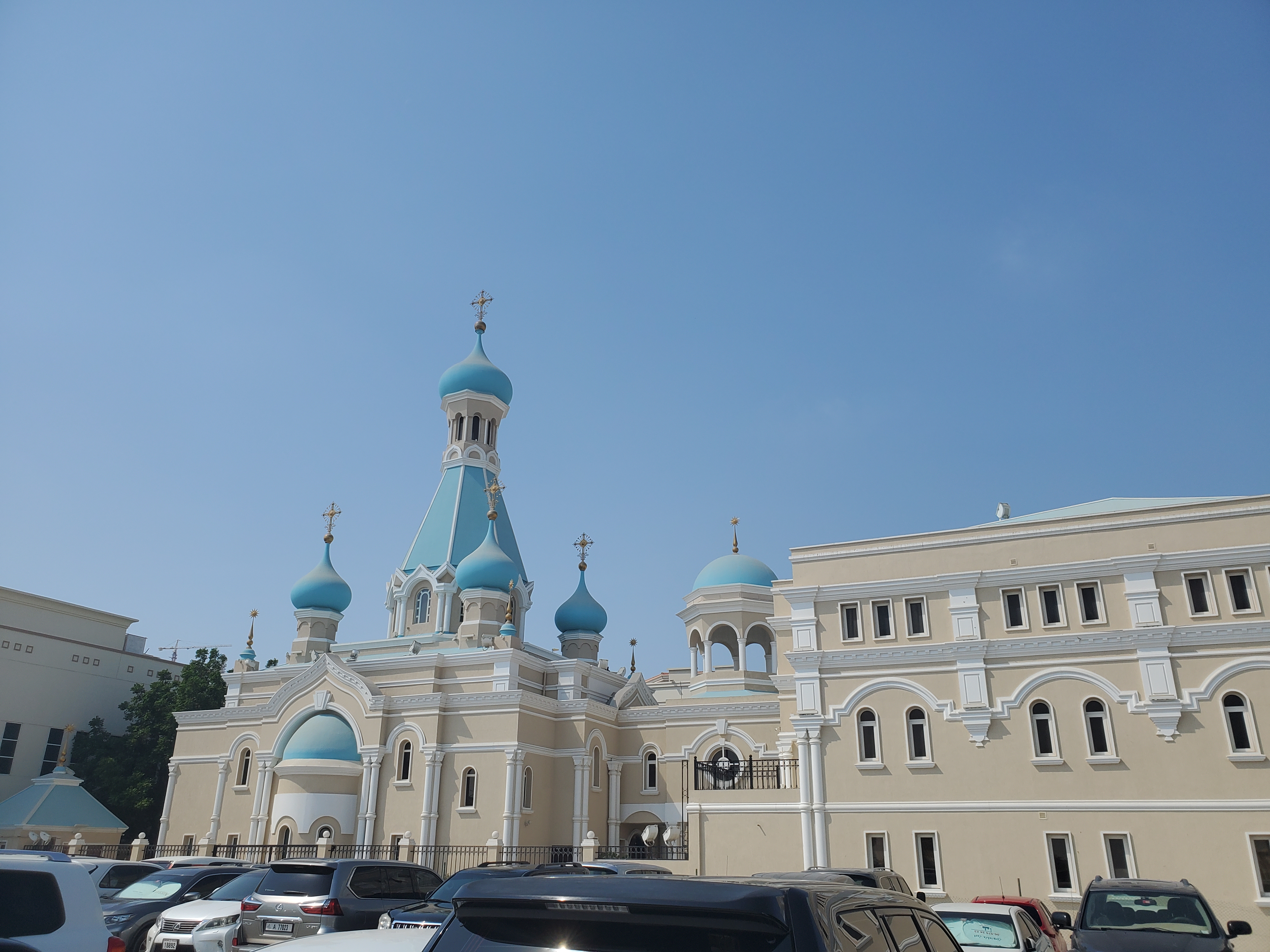
- View of Russian Orthodox Church, Sharjah
- Russian Orthodox Church, Sharjah
- 25.350086°N 55.404226°E
- Location: Al Yarmook, Sharjah, United Arab Emirates
- Country: United Arab Emirates
- Website: prav-church.ae

History
- Founded: August 13, 2011

Specifications
- Capacity: 20,000

St. Philip the Apostle Russian Orthodox Church (Arabic: الكنيسة الأرثوذكسية الروسية للقديس فيليب الرسول) is a Russian Orthodox Church located in Sharjah, United Arab Emirates. It is part of the Patriarchate of Antioch. It is the only Christian Orthodox church in the Arabian Peninsula with an area of 1,800 square metres (19,000 sq ft)> capacity of 20,000 worshippers. The church opened on Saturday August 13, 2011.

== Background ==
Discussions about building the church began in 2005. The church was given approval to start construction in May 2007. The church was designed by architect, Yury Kirs who based his drawings on one of the churches in Saint Petersburg - the city that Yury Kirs hails from. One of the main contributors and founders was businessman Yuri Grigorievich Sidorenko. The church had received its blessings from the head of the parish, Hegumen Alexander Zarkesher of Moscow as well as from His Beatitude Patriarch Ignatius IV. It is one of the rarest Russian Orthodox churches in design as it has a gold cross on each of the five domes, all made in Russia.

The land the church was built on was given to the Russian Orthodox community by Sultan bin Muhammad Al-Qasimi, Ruler of Sharjah. It is predominantly attended by expatriates from former Soviet Union countries, with regular baptism services occurring weekly. The church also runs Russian language classes for children born in the United Arab Emirates. In 2020, it was closed alongside other places of worship temporarily due to the COVID-19 pandemic in the United Arab Emirates. During Holy Week in the 2026 Iran War, many churches in Dubai were ordered to close on security grounds but the Russian Orthodox Church remained open.
