= Muwaileh Commercial =

Suburb, Community city and residential area in Sharjah, UAE

Muwaileh Commercial تجارية مويلح
- Interactive map of Muwaileh Commercial
- Coordinates: 25.3071778°N 55.4620287°E
- Country: United Arab Emirates
- Emirate: Sharjah
- Suburb: Sharjah

Population
  - Total: 100,000

Muwaileh Commercial or Muwaileh Sharjah (Arabic: تجارية مويلح) is a city, suburb and residential area in the emirate of Sharjah, UAE. It is one of the most densely populated areas of the Emirates. One of the master communities here is Aljada.

== Demographics ==
Muwaileh Commercial, located on the northern border of Muwaileh community, has direct access to Sheikh Mohammed Bin Zayed Road (E311), a highway that connects seven emirates of the UAE, while Maliha Road runs along the east of this area. To its south lies Industrial Area 15 and 17, while University City of Sharjah lies to the south of Muwailih Commercial.

== Landmarks ==
- Aljada
- City Centre Al Zahia
- University City of Sharjah
- National paint Sharjah
- School Zone

== Neighbourhoods ==
- Downtown Sharjah
- Al Qasimia
- Rolla Sharjah
