= Roads & Transport Authority =

Roads & Transport Authority may refer to:

- Roads & Transport Authority (Dubai)
- Roads & Transport Authority (Sharjah)
