= SRTA =

SRTA may refer to:

- Roads & Transport Authority (Sharjah), a public transport authority in Sharjah, UAE.
- Southeastern Regional Transit Authority, a public transport authority in Bristol County and Plymouth County, Massachusetts
- State Road and Tollway Authority, a government agency of the U.S. state of Georgia
- Sortase A, an enzyme, abbreviated as SrtA
