= Adventureland (United Arab Emirates) =

Theme park in Sharjah, United Arab Emirates

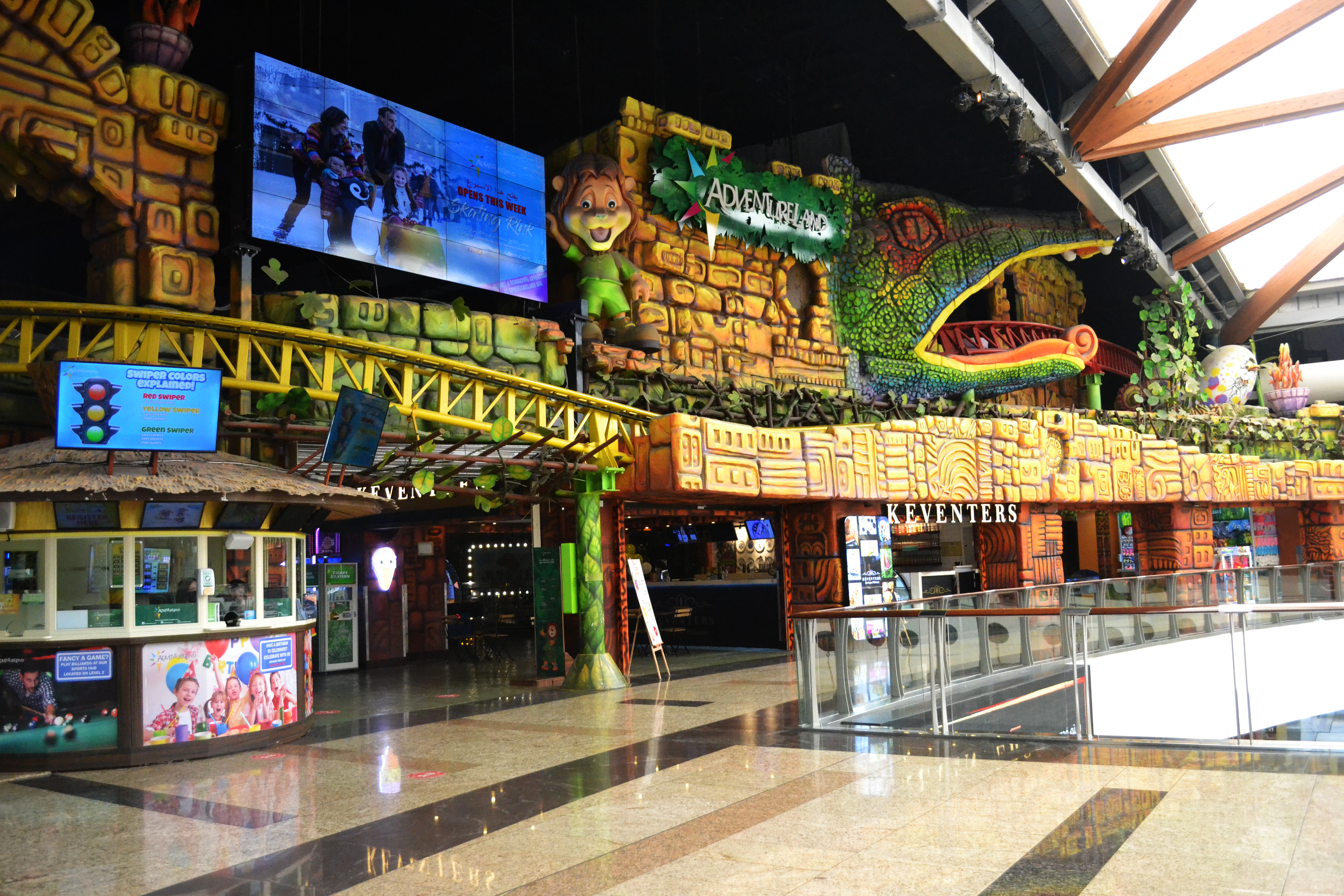
- Interactive map of Adventureland
- Location: Sahara Centre, Sharjah, United Arab Emirates
- Coordinates: 25.2978°N 55.3723°E
- Area: 90,000 square feet (8,400 m^{2})

Attractions
- Roller coasters: 3

Adventureland is an indoor family entertainment center in the Sahara Centre shopping mall in Sharjah, United Arab Emirates. The center has an area of more than 90,000 square feet (8,400 m^{2}), making it one of the largest family entertainment centers in the Middle East. It offers over 40 rides and attractions, as well as 170+ varied games, making it one of the most sought-after family entertainment centers in the UAE.
