= Al Shuwaiheyeen =

Historic neighbourhood in Sharjah, United Arab Emirates

Coordinates: 25°21′40″N 55°23′16″E

Al Shuwaiheyeen (Arabic: الشويهين), also spelled Al Shuwaihean, is a historic neighbourhood in the centre of the city of Sharjah, United Arab Emirates. One of the oldest urban quarters of the emirate, it contains a number of traditional markets and heritage buildings and lies within the Heart of Sharjah conservation area.

== History ==
Al Shuwaiheyeen was a commercial hub of old Sharjah, serving for more than 150 years as a meeting point for merchants, Bedouin and caravans from neighbouring regions. Its traditional courtyard houses belonged to pearl and maritime traders and were set among narrow alleyways and small markets characteristic of the old town.

== Heritage and landmarks ==
The neighbourhood is known for its traditional souqs, foremost among them Souq Al Arsah, regarded as one of the oldest marketplaces in the United Arab Emirates and historically a trading point for Bedouin tribes and merchants from Persia and India. Since the 2000s the area has been restored as part of the Heart of Sharjah project, described as the largest heritage-preservation project in the region, which aims to return the old town to its 1950s appearance.

== See also ==
- Heart of Sharjah
- Sharjah
