= Bait Al Naboodah =

Museum in the United Arab Emirates

Coordinates: 25.35805°N 55.38405°E

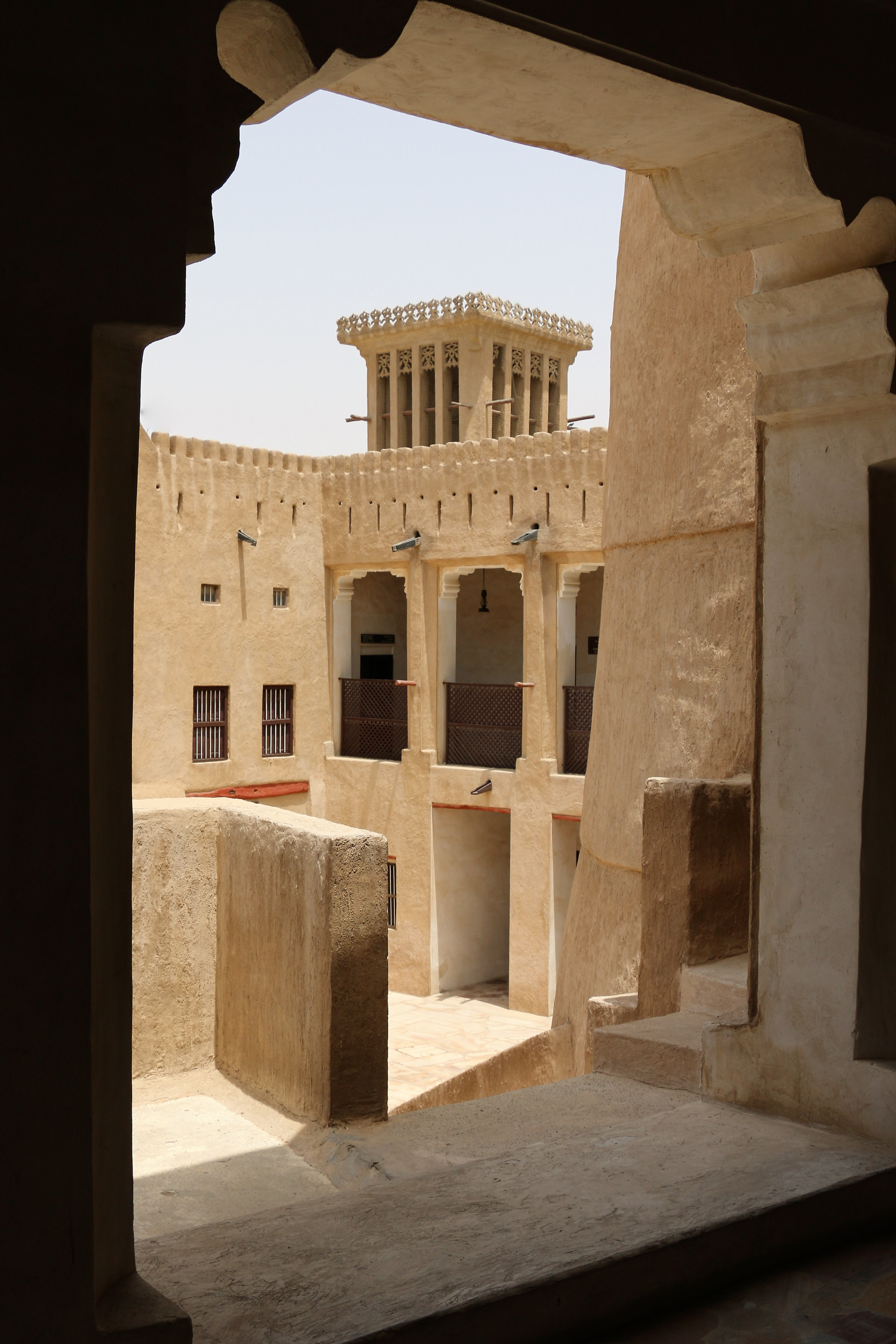
Bait Al Naboodah

Bait Al Naboodah, Al Naboodah House, is a pearl merchant's house and museum located in the Heart of Sharjah, the restored old town and heritage area of Sharjah, United Arab Emirates (UAE).

== House ==
The house, a traditional Arabian family home based around a courtyard with almond and palm trees, was built in approximately 1845. It is an outstanding example of its style and features fine carved teak reflective of the wealth and status of its owner, the pearl merchant Obaid Bin Isa Bin Ali Al Shamsi, who was known as Al Naboodah. His family were members of the influential Al Bu Shamis tribe (Al Shamsi is the singular of Al Bu Shamis). Obaid Al Naboodah had three wives. He gave his name to one of the UAE's great trading families, today employing some 16,000 staff and active across aviation, construction, agriculture and logistics.

Built from coral, gypsum, and adobe, the house consists of numerous rooms surrounding a central courtyard. The family quarters are accessible separately from the outside, supporting extended family members. The house underwent expansion to accommodate his children and their respective families. The house is a double story building, relatively unusual for its time and a symbol of great wealth. As well as the traditional barjeel wind towers for cooling, the house features malaqaf, wind catchers, built into the walls.

== Trading ==
Al Naboodah's majlis was located opposite the family home. He traded his pearls with markets in the UK and France but also, crucially, with India and it was the legendary wealth of the Maharajahs which was to form the mainstay of his business. This Indian trade also allowed Al Naboodah to buy great columns and doors of teak from India and ship them back to Sharjah to his ever-growing house, which was eventually to reach 10,000 metres in area.

Al Naboodah was an unusually cosmopolitan figure in contemporary Sharjah, maintaining houses in Paris and Mumbai as well as his family home in what was then a relatively small, if affluent, town. Like many merchants of his class, he was hit hard by the slow decline in pearling that decimated the fisheries and associated trade from 1910 onwards. With pearling boats laid up and the entire system of trade which subsisted around pearling collapsing, the populace of Sharjah (and the other coastal emirates of the Trucial States) was faced with financial ruin, poverty and, ultimately, starvation. Although Al Naboodah was known for his generosity, times were harsh. Efforts by the British Board of Trade to find alternative markets for the Gulf's pearls failed and diversification was the only route open to many traders who would have been saddled with considerable debts throughout the slow collapse of the trade.

== Restoration ==
Members of the family continued to live in the house through its long decline until the 1970s, when it was left to Sharjah Heritage. Suffering extensive water and termite damage, the house was originally restored in the 1990s and then re-opened in April 2018 following major restoration work.
