= Sharjah Central Souq =

Historic Landmark and historic building in Sharjah, United Arab Emirates

Sharjah Central Souq Blue Souk
- السوق المركزي (Arabic)
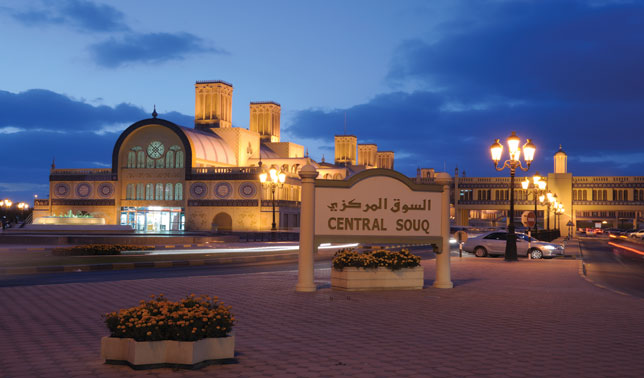
- Night View of Sharjah Central Souq
- Interactive map of the Sharjah Central Souq; Blue Souk area

General information
- Architectural style: Islamic architecture: Eclectic; Mosaic
- Location: Al Jubail, Emirate of Sharjah, United Arab Emirates
- Coordinates: 25.3489964°N 55.3807475°E
- Construction started: 1978
- Inaugurated: 1980
- Owner: Sharjah Commerce and Tourism Development Authority

Height
- Height: 50 m (160 ft)

Dimensions
- Diameter: 160 m × 150 m (520 ft × 490 ft)

Technical details
- Floor area: 80,000 m^{2} (860,000 sq ft)

Design and construction
- Architect: Michael Lyell Associates

Other information
- Public transit access: bus station

Sharjah Central Souq (Arabic: السوق المركزي, romanized: Sūq al-Markazi) also known as the Blue Souk or Gold Souq is the covered souq (market) located in King Faisal Street, Sharjah, United Arab Emirates, adjacent to the 'Smile You Are In Sharjah' roundabout and the Khaled Lagoon. The Central Souk consists of two large connected buildings, with an area of approximately 80,000sqm and over 600 shops.

== History ==
The Central Souq has been designed by the British architects Michael Lyell Associates, based on the ideas and guidance of the Ruler of Sharjah, Dr. Sultan Bin Mohammed Al Qasimi, and was completed in 1978. The architecture captures the character of a traditional market on a grand scale. Located on the King Faisal Street, Sharjah

== Architecture ==
The Central Souk consists of two large buildings, interconnected by bridges, with exuberant vaults and a unique skyline of 20 windtowers. Because of the blue tiles on the outside walls, the market is called the Blue Souk. On a total aerea of approximately 80,000sqm there are more than 600 shops

== Honorable mention ==
The Central Souq featured on a United Arab Emirates's five-dirham note (Bank Note AED 5)
