= Fili Fort =

- Near Al Madam in Sharjah, United Arab Emirates

Site information
- Condition: Restored

Location
- Location within United Arab Emirates
- Coordinates: 25°00′19.2″N 55°55′24″E

Site history
- Built: 1850
- Materials: Rock, mudbrick, gypsum

Fili Fort (Al Hisn Fili) is a late Islamic fortification located to the East of the town of Madam, in the United Arab Emirates' emirate of Sharjah.

== The two forts ==
There are in fact two forts at Hili, Fili West Fort and Fili East Fort. The West fort is built on a hill at a distance of some 875 metres from the East fort. Until recently, Fili East Fort, a later building dating to the C19th, was uniquely referred to as Fili Fort. However, Fili West Fort has recently been substantively reconstructed and used as the centrepiece of an extensive heritage site and is now referred to as Fili Fort. It has been added to the ICESCO (Islamic World Educational, Scientific, and Cultural Organisation) World Heritage List.

Fili Fort is located on a small hill in the Madam plain and was established around a watchtower, or Muraba'a, and is said locally to be 500 years old, a dating not supported by archaeologists, who estimate both forts to be C19th constructions.

The two forts are connected by a network of two underground waterways, or aflaj, which themselves connect to aflaj running from the Hajar Mountains. These aflaj significantly predate both forts, having been constructed in the Iron Age - the first millennium BCE.

Fili East Fort was at one stage used as a police station and a more modern, smooth-walled section attached to the square fortification (on the opposite corner to the two-story tower) attests to this later use. The ruin of an old souq, a four-roomed flat-roofed structure, stands nearby Fili East Fort. A number of Islamic era burials dot the plain around the fort. Finds of ceramics in the area date from Iron Age to C19th Chinese trade ware.

== World Heritage nomination ==
Fili Fort formed part of Sharjah's 2018 bid for UNESCO World Heritage Status, under the heading 'Sharjah, Gateway to the Trucial States', which also included the Heart of Sharjah; Sharjah Fort; the former barracks of the Trucial Oman Scouts in Mirgab; Al Mahatta Fort, the first airport in the Gulf; the coastal town of Khor Fakkan; the oasis and settlement of Wadi Al Helo, all following the theme of a return to the simplicity and natural lifestyles of the late 1950s.

Three forts in Sharjah are now inscribed on the ICESCO list: Dhaid Fort, Fili Fort and Dibba Al Hisn Fort.
