= Al Bait Hotel =

Chedi Al Bait Hotel
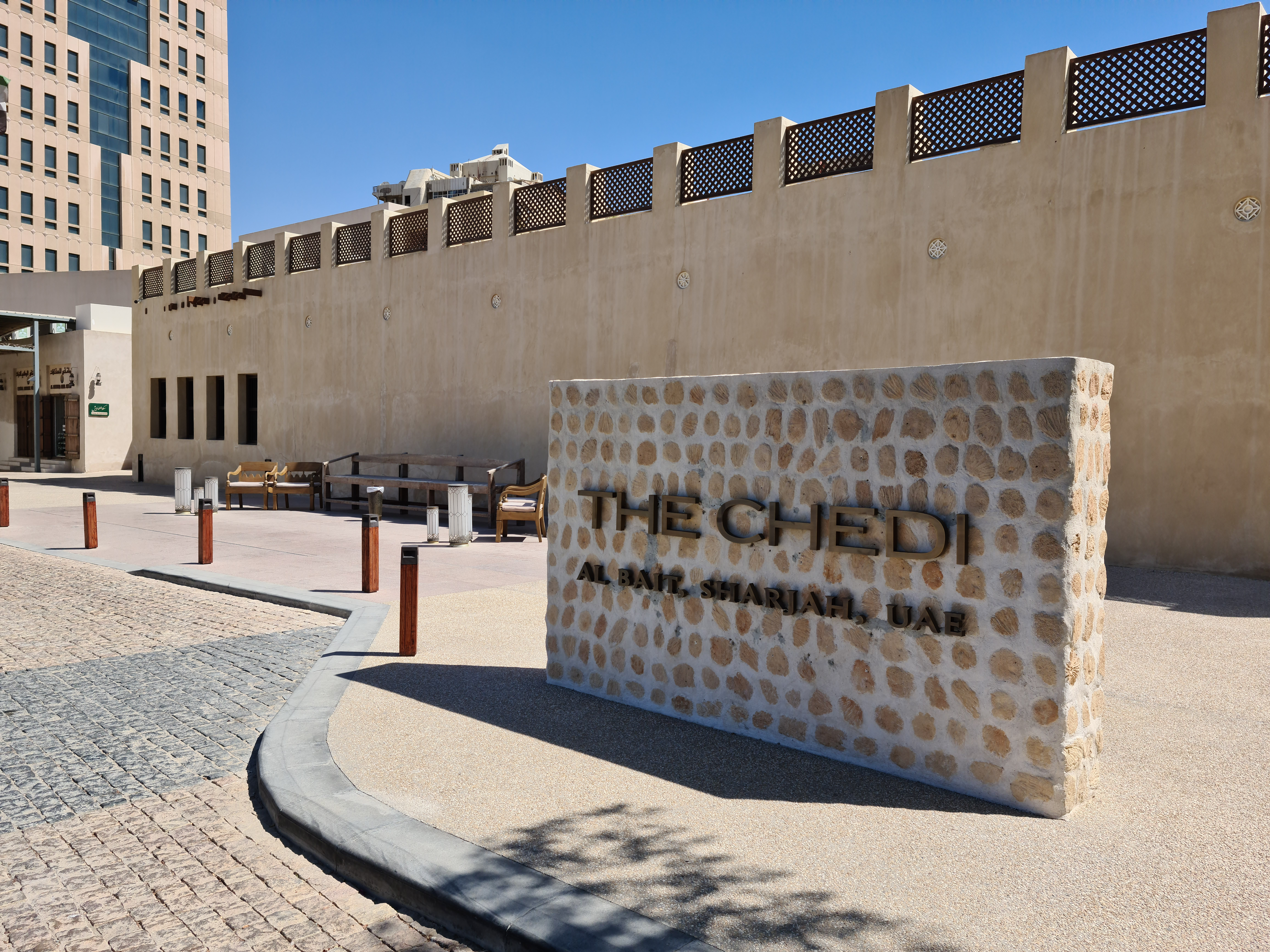

- The Chedi Al Bait Hotel, Sharjah
- Alternative names: Chedi Al Bait Hotel

General information
- Type: Hotel
- Location: Sharjah, United Arab Emirates
- Coordinates: 25°35′54″N 55°38′34″E
- Inaugurated: December 2018
- Landlord: Sharjah Investment Authority (Shurooq)

Design and construction
- Architect: Godwin Austen Johnson

The Chedi Al Bait Hotel is a 65-room five star heritage hotel situated in the Heart of Sharjah cultural heritage area in Sharjah, United Arab Emirates – a restoration of the traditional trading and residential district of Sharjah town.

== Property ==
The Al Bait Hotel (Al Bait is Arabic for 'the house') is constructed around a core which comprises four former traders' houses: Bait Ibrahim Bin Mohammed Al Midfa – The library and café (the café is built from the Majlis Ibrahim Al Midfa); Bait Eissa Al Midfa – Reception; Bait Abdul Rahman Al Midfa – The Heritage guestroom block; and Bait Abdullah Al Mahmood – The Arabic restaurant. The architect responsible for the $54.45 million redevelopment was Godwin Austen Johnson. The original houses, constructed from mudbricks and coral with teak and mango wood pillars and barasti (palm frond) ceilings, date back to 1927. The hotel was first announced in 2013 and slated for 2015 completion, and was finally opened following further delays in December 2018, by the Ruler of Sharjah, Dr Sultan bin Mohammed Al Qasimi.

Ibrahim Bin Mohammed Al Midfa was a prominent Sharjah citizen, a journalist and publisher of Sharjah's first newspaper, and his majlis (preserved in the hotel development) was a popular cultural meeting place. Items of Al Midfa's possessions are displayed in cabinets in the hotel. The majlis is topped by a circular barjeel, or wind tower, which is unique in the United Arab Emirates.

== Restoration ==
The hotel restoration involved UNESCO experts, with the restoration of the Majlis Al Midfa's barjeel overseen by the same team that worked on the restoration of the Leaning Tower of Pisa. The hotel property extends the original four houses to a 2.4 acre property with streets, courtyards and alleys designed to reflect and recreate the feeling of the old Sharjah souk area. Traditional recessed alcoves are used in the 65 guest rooms and the rooms maintain the specific proportions of the old village homes, given the availability of structural timbers, with timber ceilings and traditional finishes and colours. In 2015, the hotel was awarded Interior Design of the Year – Hotels Category by Commercial Interior Design magazine. It was also named 'United Arab Emirates most luxurious hotel 2019' by the Robb Report.

== Brand ==
As well as standard rooms, luxury suites and restaurants, the hotel has a pool and 500 square metre spa. The hotel made headlines when it launched a Dhs 250,000 ($68,000) weekend package comprising yacht transfers, a private island picnic and personalised engraved jewellery in October 2019. The hotel's general manager justified the package as economical, commenting to newspaper The National, "One might argue that it’s rather economical at $850 per person per couple per year if you amortise the cost of the weekend as memories over the next four decades."

Originally launched as the Al Bait Hotel and managed by GHM hotels (the owners of the Chedi brand), the hotel was rebranded as the Chedi Al Bait Hotel in March 2020.

The hotel comprised part of the first five phases of the Heart of Sharjah project by the Sharjah Investment and Development Authority (Shurooq), a $2 billion investment in developing Sharjah as a cultural and tourist destination. The Heart of Sharjah project includes restaurants, retail areas, art galleries, themed markets, archaeological sites, museums, play areas and commercial offices. Construction includes the reconstruction and renovation of historical buildings for a variety of uses as well as the construction of new buildings.

The hotel closed in 2020 as a result of the COVID-19 pandemic, but was re-opened in July of that year.
