= Ibrahim Bin Mohammed Al Midfa =

Emirati journalist

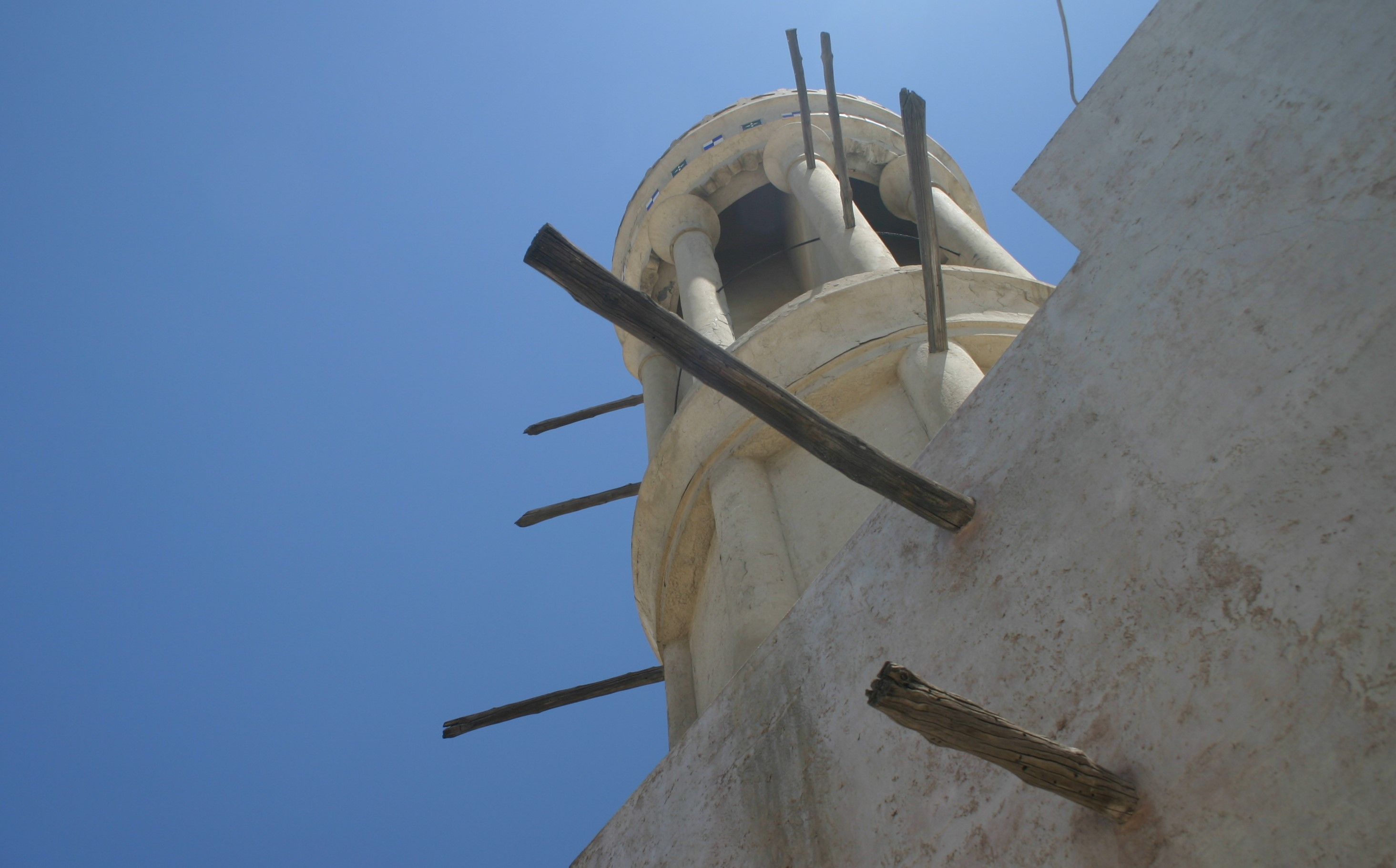
The ornate and unique circular barjeel at the Ibrahim bin Mohammed Al Midfa House in the Heart of Sharjah. This image was taken prior to its restoration and inclusion in the Al Bait Hotel.

Ibrahim Bin Mohammed Al Midfa was the first journalist in Sharjah, United Arab Emirates, producing a handwritten news-sheet called Oman newspaper in 1927. A prominent local intellectual at the time, he presided over regular meetings of local writers, poets and political activists at a time when British influence and presence in the Trucial States was beginning to be questioned by local community leaders.

Ibrahim Al Midfa's family originated in Trucial Oman but moved to Sharjah in 1660, where they became wealthy traders in foodstuffs, perfumes and latterly pearling. Born in 1909, Al Midfa built a house in central Sharjah in the same year he launched his newspaper. The house was constructed using the relatively expensive resource of imported teak, a testament to his wealthy background at the time.

== The Bait Al Midfa ==
Al Midfa's majlis became a popular meeting place, particularly of men of letters, as Ibrahim built a reputation as a learned man, and he built a unique circular barjeel, or windtower, to cool the space. Regular gatherings at the majlis took place to discuss poetry, literature and politics. The ornate barjeel - wind tower - was decorated with tiles imported from India, another indication of Al Midfa's relative wealth by the standards of the time. It stands as the only circular barjeel in the United Arab Emirates. The Al Midfa house - the Bait Al Midfa - and its majlis stands today, as does the barjeel above it, as part of the modern Chedi Al Bait Hotel development and various items of Al Midfa's possessions are displayed in cabinets in the hotel.

Outside the majlis, a verandah runs along the length of the building, with four serrated archways and columns to its exterior. As well as teak beams, mangrove poles supported the roof, with woven barasti, palm fronds, packing the ceiling space. The building itself is of gypsum and coral, the latter keeping the walls porous and breathable, while wind scoops in the walls helped to ventilate the space. The courtyard of the majlis was shaded by a large tree that the family would sleep around in the hot summer months. The house was abandoned in the 1970s, until it was renovated and opened to the public as a museum in 1996, prior to the construction of the Al Bait Hotel, which incorporates the Bait Al Midfa and three other merchants' houses into its structure. Two of Al Midfa's brothers' houses also form part of the hotel building - Bait Eissa Al Midfa forms the hotel reception and Bait Abdul Rahman Al Midfa has become the Heritage guestroom block.

== Oman Newspaper ==
Although Al Khaleej, launched in 1970, was the first offset printed newspaper in Sharjah - and the Trucial States - Al Midfa's Oman is widely recognised as the first newspaper to be produced in the area. Published on a bi-weekly basis, the newspaper was painstakingly copied by hand and some half-dozen copies were circulated around the souk and majlis' of the town. One copy was regularly posted in the souq for public consumption. Oman was notable for its opposition to foreign influence in Sharjah and was both strident and sarcastic in tone.

Al Midfa subsequently issued a second periodical, Sawt Al Asafeer (the Sound of Birds). He was also responsible for launching Sharjah's first postal service.
