= Al Butina, Sharjah =

Residential area in UAE

Al Butina, Sharjah البطينة الشارقة
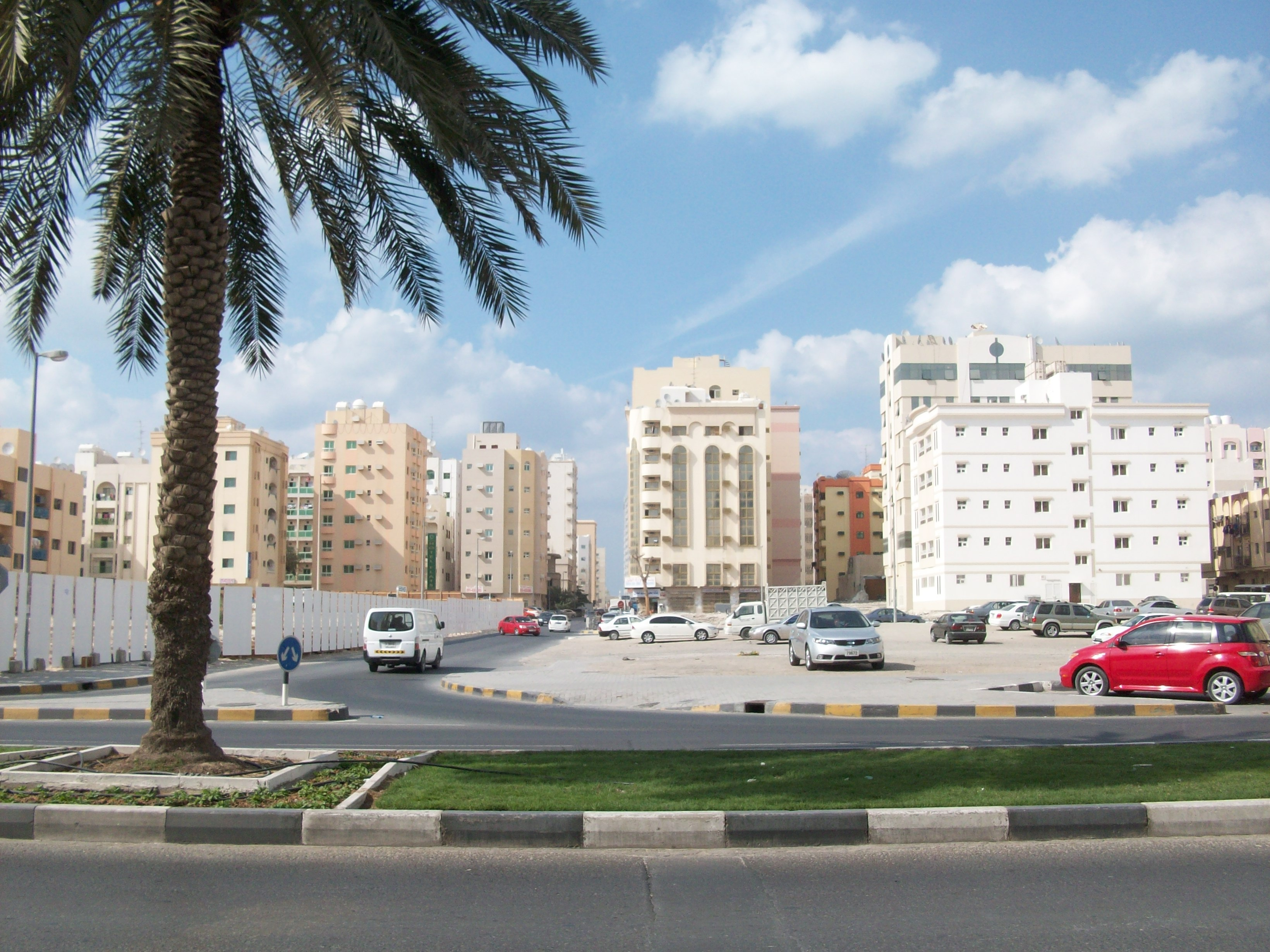
- Butina Area, Sharjah
- Nicknames: Butina, Bu Tina
- Interactive map of Al Butina, Sharjah
- Coordinates: 25.371154°N 55.405699°E
- Country: United Arab Emirates
- Emirate: Sharjah
- City: Sharjah

Population
  - Total: 200,000

Al Butina, also known as Bu Tina or simply Butina, is a populated residential area situated in the Al Sharq district of the north-west area of emirate of Sharjah, in the United Arab Emirates.

Bu Tina has a well-connected roadway near the Persian Gulf coast, Khalid Port, 14 kilometres from Sharjah International Airport. The area is 30.5 kilometres from Dubai. It is one of the thickly populated areas of the Emirates.

Bu Tina is a popular commercial districts as many shops, grocery stores, restaurants and commercial properties are set up in the area. The neighbourhood comprises old and new low and medium-rise buildings with studios, and one and two-bedroom apartments and has affordable rental prices, making it a home to a large population of expatriates, families and young professionals.

== Nearby Neighbourhoods ==
- Al Nasserya
- Sharqan
- Al Qulai'ahh (or Al Qulayaah)
- Al Nabba
- Al Majarra
- Al Qadisiyah
- Al Fisht
- Mayasaloon
- Rolla
