= Al Majaz Amphitheatre =

Open-air amphitheatre in Sharjah, UAE

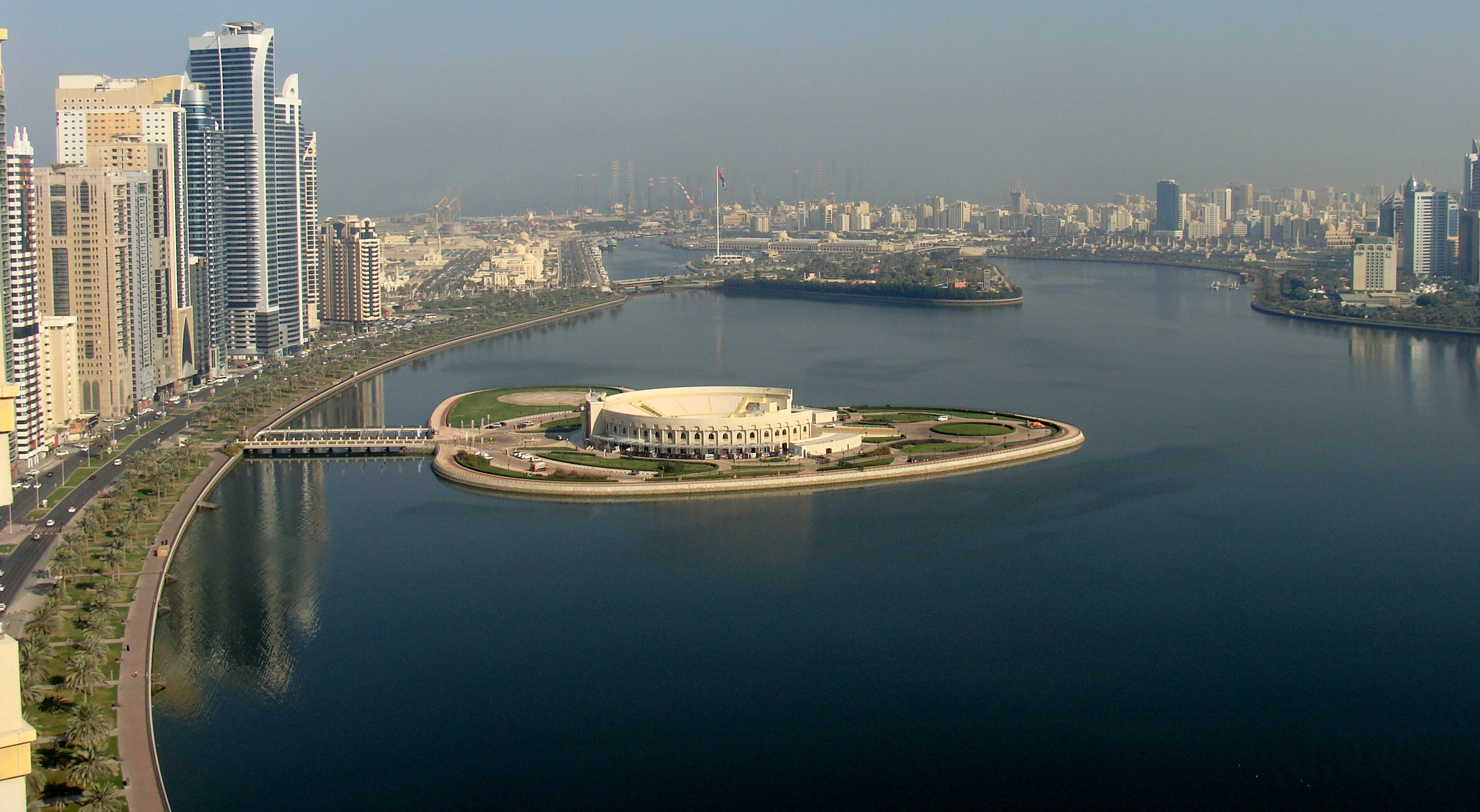
- Aerial view of the amphitheatre in 2018
- Interactive map of Al Majaz Amphitheatre
- Location: Al Majaz Island, Downtown Sharjah, Sharjah, United Arab Emirates
- Coordinates: 25.3333°N 55.3785°E
- Capacity: 4,500
- Type: Open-air amphitheatre

Construction
- Opened: 26 March 2014

Website
- almajazamphitheatre.ae

Al Majaz Amphitheatre is an open-air amphitheatre in Sharjah, United Arab Emirates. Located on Al Majaz Island in the Downtown Sharjah, it opened on 26 March 2014 as part of the wider Al Majaz Island project.

== History ==
Plans for the venue were reported in 2013, when it was presented as the first phase of the Al Majaz Island project in Sharjah. Construction began in November 2013, and by March 2014 the amphitheatre was reported to be more than 90 per cent complete.

The amphitheatre officially opened on 26 March 2014. Its opening formed part of the programme for Sharjah Capital of Islamic Culture 2014, with the theatrical production Clusters of Light staged as the inaugural performance.

Shortly before the opening, Live Nation Entertainment signed an agreement with Sharjah Media Centre to manage the venue for three years.

== Design and facilities ==
Al Majaz Amphitheatre is described as a Roman-style open-air venue with a built-up area of 7,238 square metres and a seating capacity of 4,500. The project cost was reported at AED 140 million by Khaleej Times, while Construction Week Online earlier reported a project value of AED 120 million.

The complex includes the amphitheatre itself as well as associated facilities such as a conference room, Al Majaz Marina and the Island Walk. Early press coverage also reported that the venue was equipped with more than 400 animated lights, 120 speakers and 21 projectors.

== Use ==
The venue is used for concerts, theatrical productions and cultural events. In 2026, the amphitheatre hosted a contemporary staging of the Arab epic Al-Zeer Salem, with total attendance reported at 4,800 over three nights.

== See also ==
- List of contemporary amphitheatres
- Live Nation Entertainment
