= Al Noor Island =

Island in Sharjah, United Arab Emirates

Native name: جزيرة النور
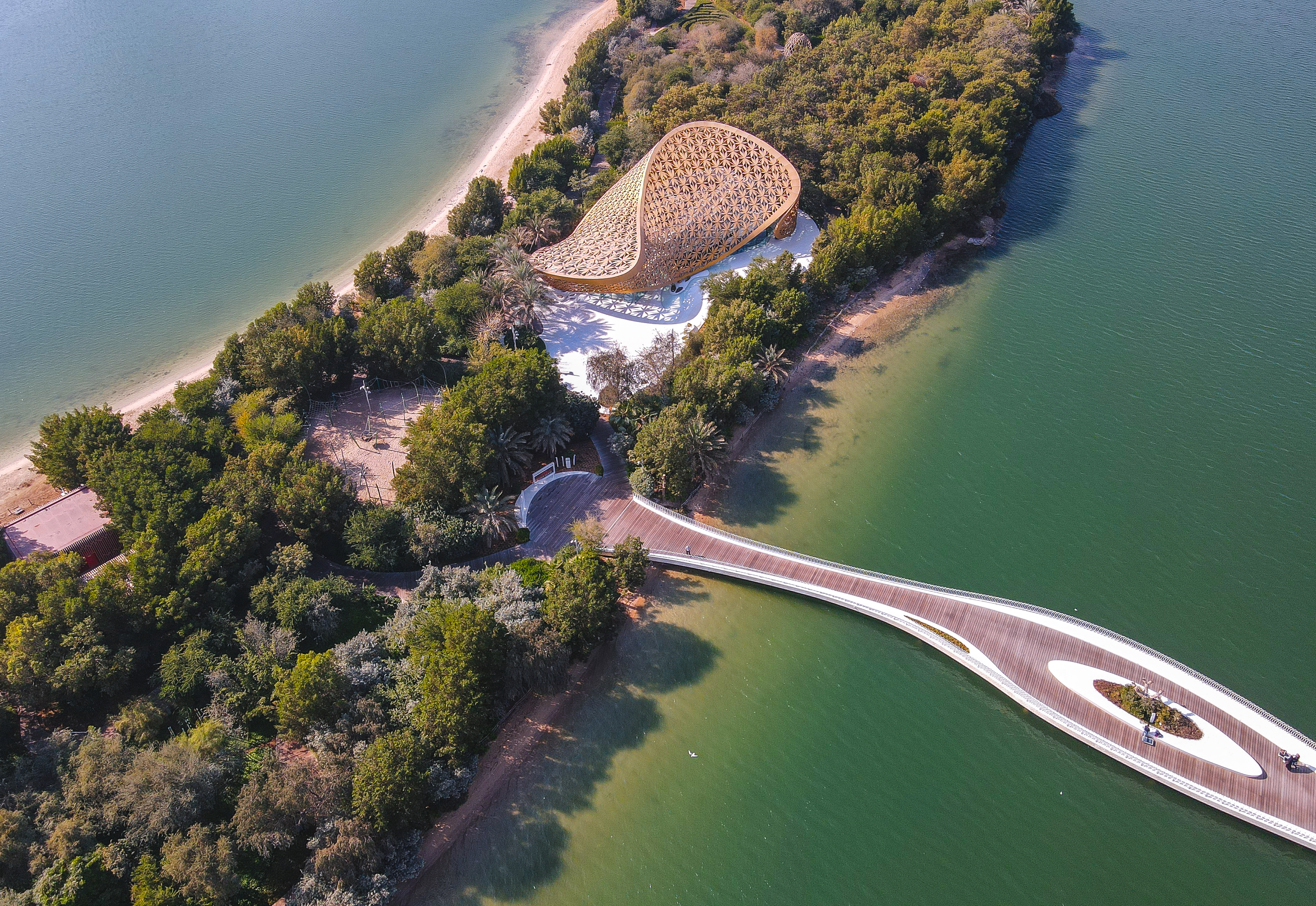
- Aerial view of Al Noor Island
- Interactive map of Al Noor Island

Geography
- Location: Khalid Lagoon, Sharjah, United Arab Emirates
- Coordinates: 25.3343834°N 55.3848622°E
- Area: 45,470 m^{2} (489,400 sq ft)

Al Noor Island is a landscaped island in Khalid Lagoon in Sharjah, United Arab Emirates. It was developed by the Sharjah Investment and Development Authority (Shurooq) and opened in December 2015. The island covers 45,470 square metres.

== History ==
Al Noor Island was inaugurated in December 2015 by Sultan bin Muhammad Al-Qasimi, the ruler of Sharjah. The development cost was reported as AED 80 million.

By 2026, the island had received more than one million visitors since its opening.

== Description ==
The island is accessed by a pedestrian bridge behind Al Noor Mosque, off Sharjah's Corniche Street. The site is arranged around pedestrian paths, planted areas, seating areas and built structures.

The island's Butterfly House is a climate-controlled glass pavilion. At the time of opening, it was reported to contain about 500 butterflies from several species. Later reports described it as housing more than 20 butterfly species.

Other features include a Literature Pavilion, a café, a gift shop, walkways, gardens, bridges and art installations. The island includes nine art installations, including OVO and Torus, and about 70,000 trees and plants.
