= Al Madam =

Al Madam ٱلْمَدَام
- Town
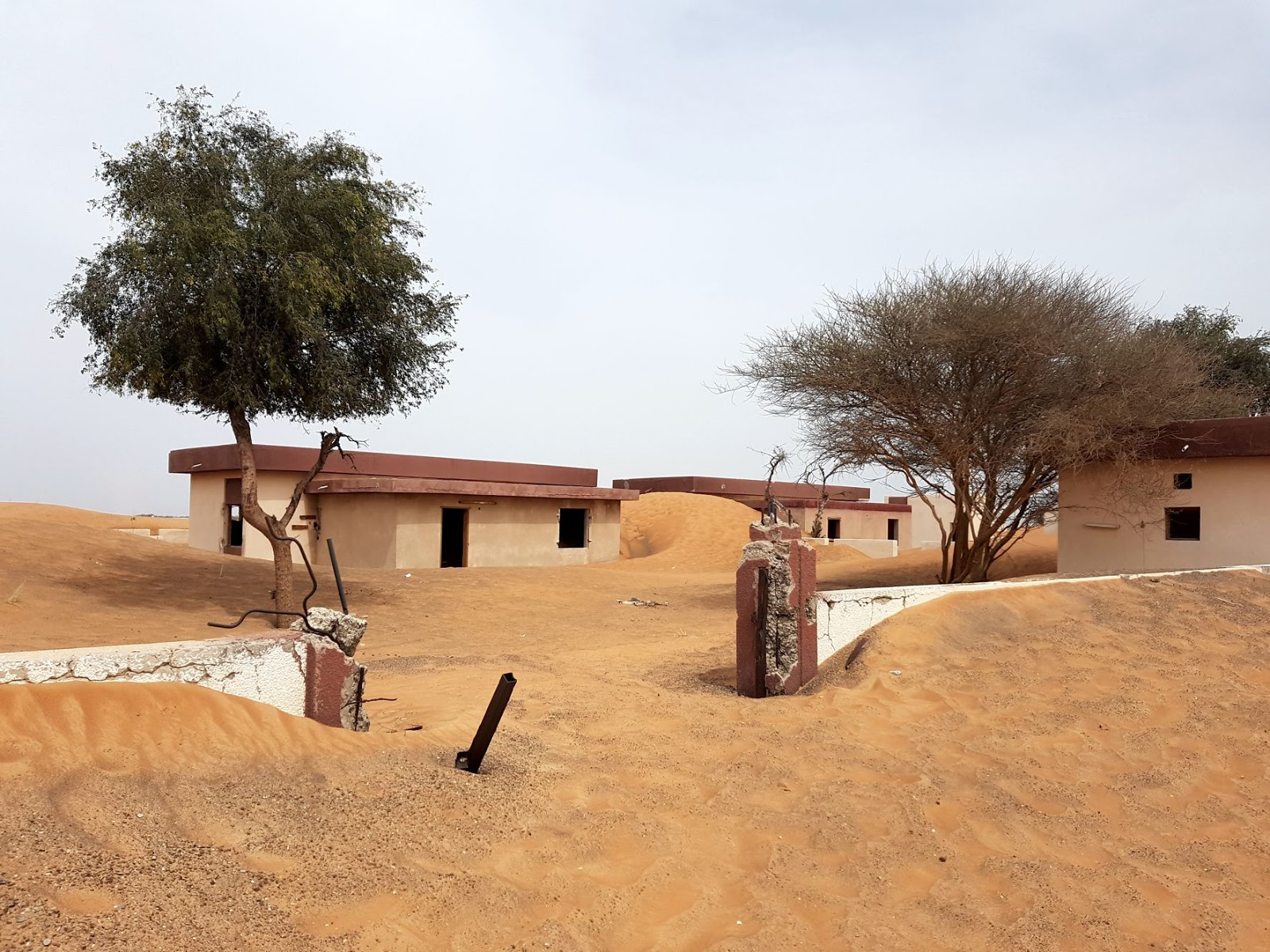
- The buried ghost village in Al-Madam
- Interactive map of Al Madam
- Location of Al-Madam in the UAE Al Madam (Persian Gulf)
- Coordinates: 24°57′41″N 55°47′25″E
- Country: United Arab Emirates
- Emirate: Sharjah

Government
  - Type: Absolute monarchy
  - Sheikh: Sultan bin Muhammad Al-Qasimi

Population (2022)
  - Total: 8,652

Al Madam (Arabic: ٱلْمَدَام) is an inland town of the Emirate of Sharjah, in the United Arab Emirates. Located at the intersection of the Dubai-Hatta (E44) and Mleiha-Shwaib (E55) roads, its development has mainly centred around these road links and the road traffic through Hatta to Oman. The volume of traffic to Oman through Madam and Hatta has lessened since the closure of the 'soft' Omani border at Mahda in 2016, although traffic volumes remain at some 5,000 travellers daily. The road from Madam to Hatta is now only open to UAE or Omani nationals and permit holders.

== Description ==
Al-Madam Municipality is in the eastern part of Sharjah's Central Region

The strip development of Madam along the E44 towards the 'dune bashing' tourist centre of Badayer (with its celebrated 'Big Red' sand dune) has resulted in the town becoming elongated, and includes the 'first shopping mall' to open there. This is in addition to municipal facilities, a medical centre, a wedding hall and a large number of shops located along the main street of the town. Al Madam is home to an annual shopping festival.

In an area of desert to the south of Madam, a small and deserted development of houses and a mosque can be found, referred to locally as both Madam Old Town and Al Madam Ghost Town (Sharjah Ghost Village) . As of 2020, those towns have been abandoned for a few decades due to desertification and dune movement. The area around Al Madam is also home to a number of Iron Age archaeological sites, including those of Al Thuqaibah and Jebel Buhais, as well as aflāj (indigenous water management systems) dating back to the 1st millennium BC. To the east of the town is the 19th-century Fili Fort.

== See also ==
- Archaeology of the United Arab Emirates
- History of the United Arab Emirates
- List of Ancient Settlements in the UAE
