= Wael Al-Masri =

Jordanian architect (born 1959)

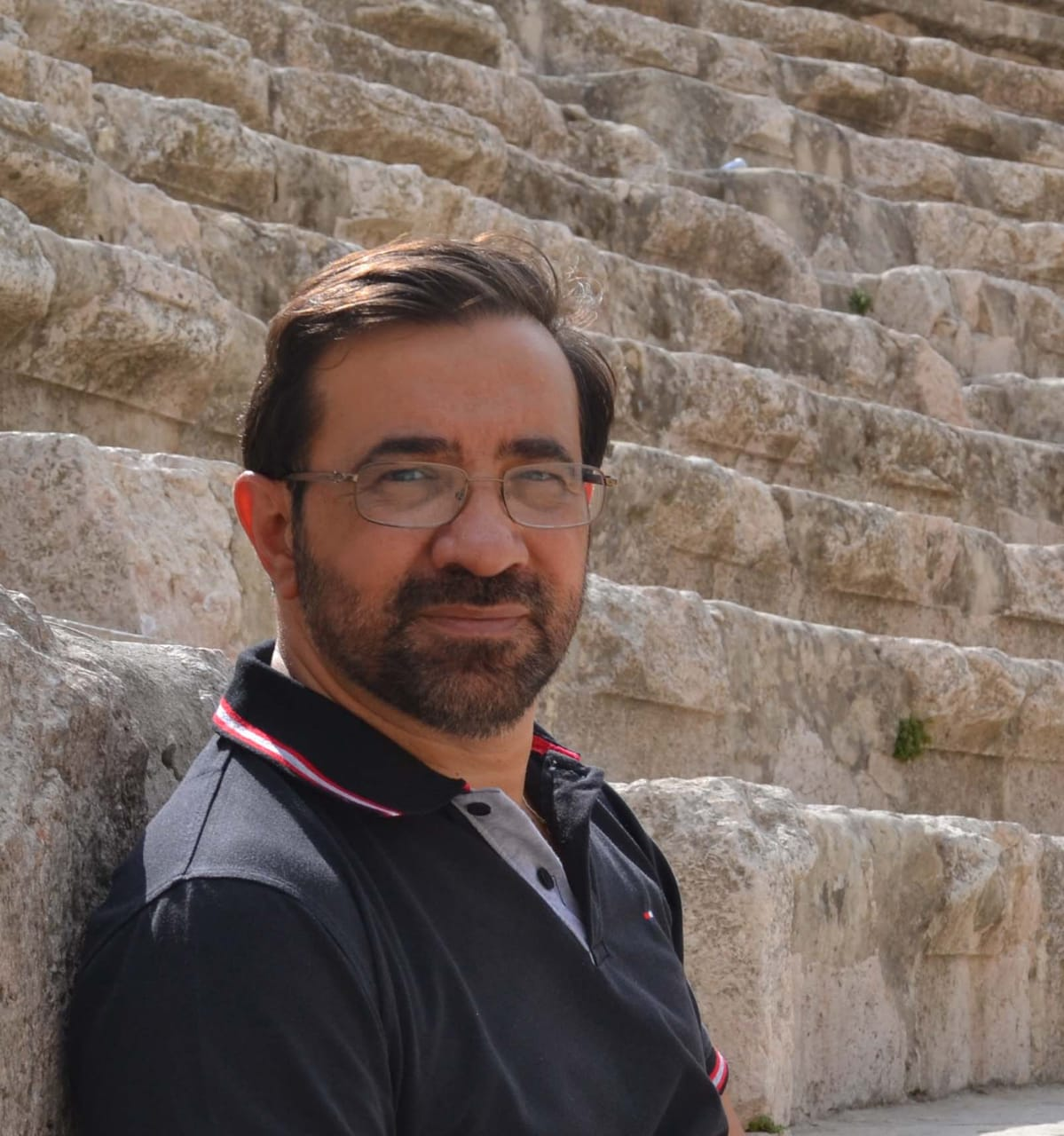
- Al-Masri in 2020
- Born: Wael Muhammad As'ad Al-Masri; 15 April 1959 (age 67); Kuwait
- Education: Massachusetts Institute of Technology; Victoria University of Manchester
- Occupation: Architect
- Buildings: Al-Mabarrah of Sabah Al-Salem Al-Sabah, Kuwait.; Al-Majaz Waterfront, Sharjah, UAE.; Ahlibank Muscat, Oman.; Al-Fahaheel Waterfront, Kuwait.

Wael Muhammad As'ad Al-Masri (born April 15, 1959, in Kuwait) is a Jordanian architect and native Jerusalemite of Palestinian descent.

== Education ==
Al-Masri completed his bachelor's degree in architecture from Victoria University of Manchester in 1984. Additionally, he received his Master of Science in Architecture Studies at the Massachusetts Institute of Technology.

== Career ==
=== Projects ===
- Al-Fahaheel Waterfront, Kuwait with Dar Al Omran.
- Heart of Sharjah Master Plan, Sharjah, UAE with Dar Al Omran.
- Heart of Sharjah Management Office, Sharjah, UAE.
- Al-Majaz Waterfront, Sharjah, UAE.
- Kalba Waterfront Sharjah, UAE.
- Ahlibank Muscat, Oman.
- Mysk Al Badayer Retreat, UAE.
- Dibba Al-Hisn, Sharjah, UAE.

== Positions and roles ==
- Founder and Chief Architect of Wael Al-Masri Planners and Architects (WMPA), established in 2009.
- Member of the Royal Institute of British Architects (RIBA).
- President of Jordanian Architects Society (JAS) since 2017.
- President of the Fifth Architectural Jordanian International Conference held in Amman in 2016.
- Partner and Chief Architect/Director of Urban Planning and Architectural Design, Head of Architecture, and Project Manager at Dar Al-Omran (Jordan).
- Senior Architect/Administrator for the Jordan Sustainable Tourism Development Project, with the Washington-based company Chemonics International in 1995–1996.
- Architect at the Kuwaiti Engineer's Office (KEO) from 1984 to 1990.

== Awards and honors ==
1975–2000

- "General Merit Award" from Swindon Technical College, England. 1978.
- RIBA Napper Urban Design Prize, from the Royal Institute of British Architects. 1984.
- Haywood Prize for "The Architectural Student of the year 1984" Manchester, United Kingdom.
- Scholarship award from the Aga Khan Program for Islamic Architecture at Harvard University and the Massachusetts Institute of Technology (1991–1993).
- Awarded a travel grant from the “Friends of Morocco,” U.S.A., to visit and document traditional architecture in Morocco, 1992.

2000–2010

- "Architectural Designer of the Year 2007 Award" from Retail City Dubai for Madinat Al-Fahaheel Project, Kuwait with Dar Al Omran.
- "Islamic Architecture Award" for the Fahaheel Waterfront Project, Al-Kout, received in Dubai in October 2007. Award was organized by the Architectural Review Magazine together with the Dubai Cityscape Convention.
- “Arab Architect Award” for lifetime achievements from the Arab Towns Organization Award Foundation, in its 9th Cycle, received in Doha, Qatar on 27 May 2008.
- "Architectural Designer of the Year 2008 Award" from Retail City Dubai for Al-Manshar Shopping Center, Kuwait.
- Winner of an architectural design competition for the Ahlibank Head Office, Oman 2009.

2010–2020

- “Commercial Project of the Year 2017” Award from “The Middle East Architect” magazine, for the Heart of Sharjah Head Office Building, UAE.
- Winner of the RIBA Cityscape Intelligence Sketchbook – Culturally Significant Vernacular Architecture in the Gulf competition, organized by RIBA and Cityscape Intelligence.

== See also ==
- Amale Andraos
- Chadi Massaad
