= Heart of Sharjah =

Heritage project in the United Arab Emirates

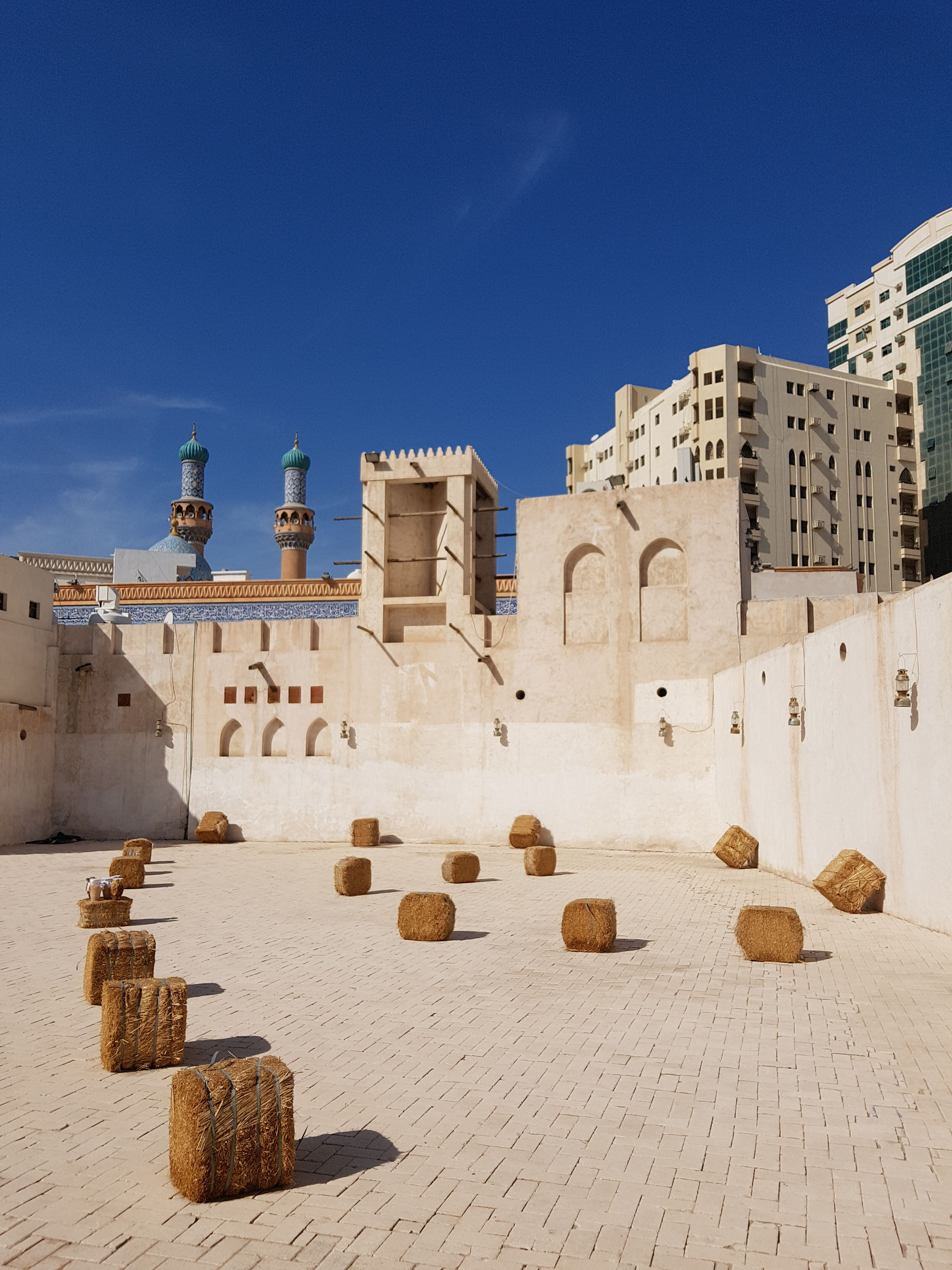
The Heart of Sharjah restoration project

The Heart of Sharjah is a cultural heritage project that aims to preserve and restore the old town of Sharjah in the United Arab Emirates (UAE) and return it to its 1950s state.

A five-phase project intended for completion in 2025, the project is being undertaken by the Sharjah Investment and Development Authority (Shurooq), together with the Sharjah Institute for Heritage, the Sharjah Museums Department, and the Sharjah Art Foundation. It has been proposed as a candidate for UNESCO World Heritage Site status.

== Heritage site ==
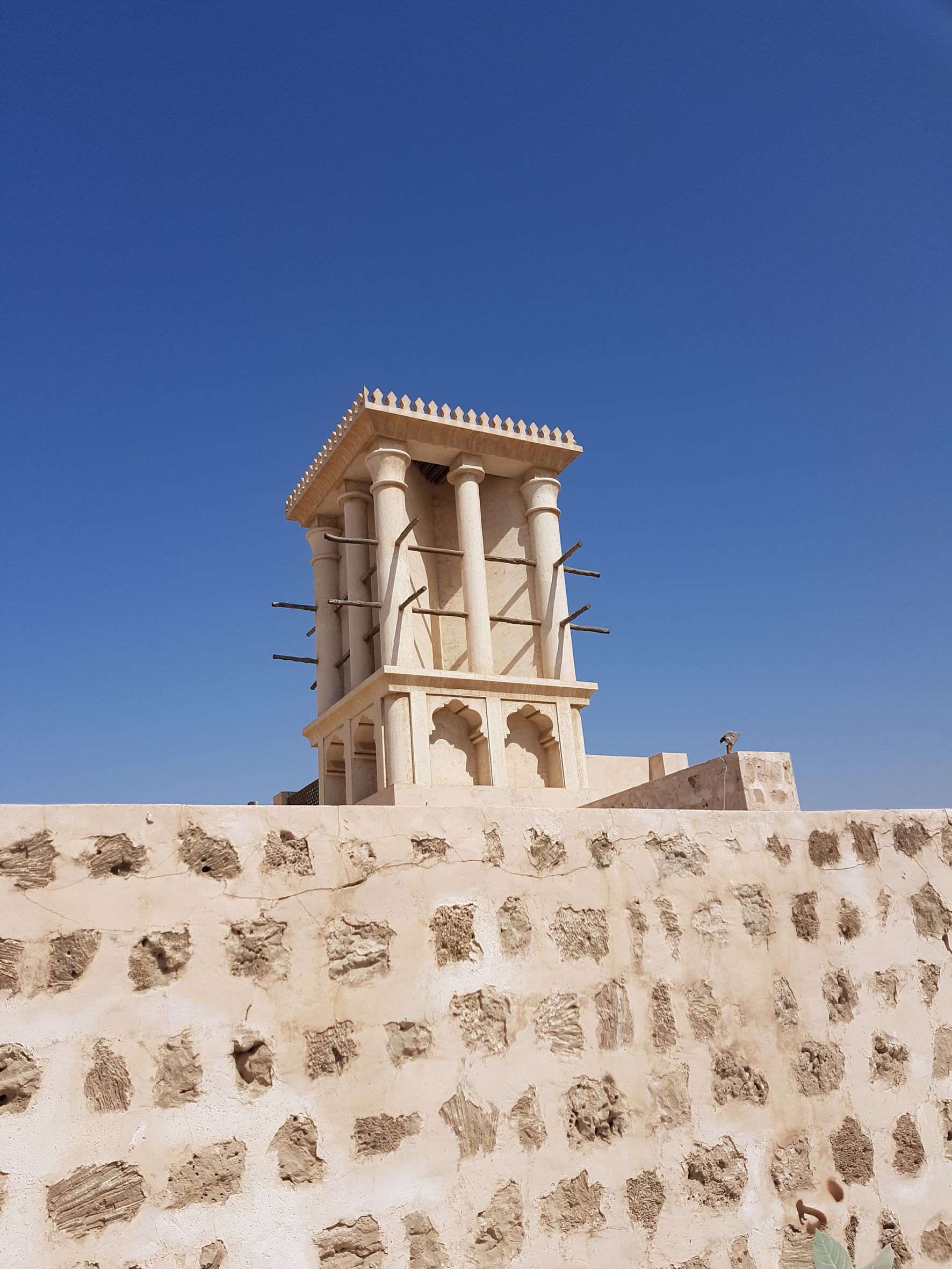
A traditional barjeel, or wind-tower, and wall showing coral construction in the Heart of Sharjah district.

The 35,000 square metre project is the largest heritage site in the Persian Gulf region and is centred around the restoration of the old Sharjah souq district. The first phases of the project involved the restoration of Al Hisn Sharjah (Sharjah Fort), which was mostly demolished in the 1980s, the Souq Al Arsah, and the 5,872 square metre Souq Shanasiyah. The Heart of Sharjah includes the souqs as well as several important merchant's houses including the Bait Al Naboodah, the Sharjah Heritage Museum, and the Al Eslah School.

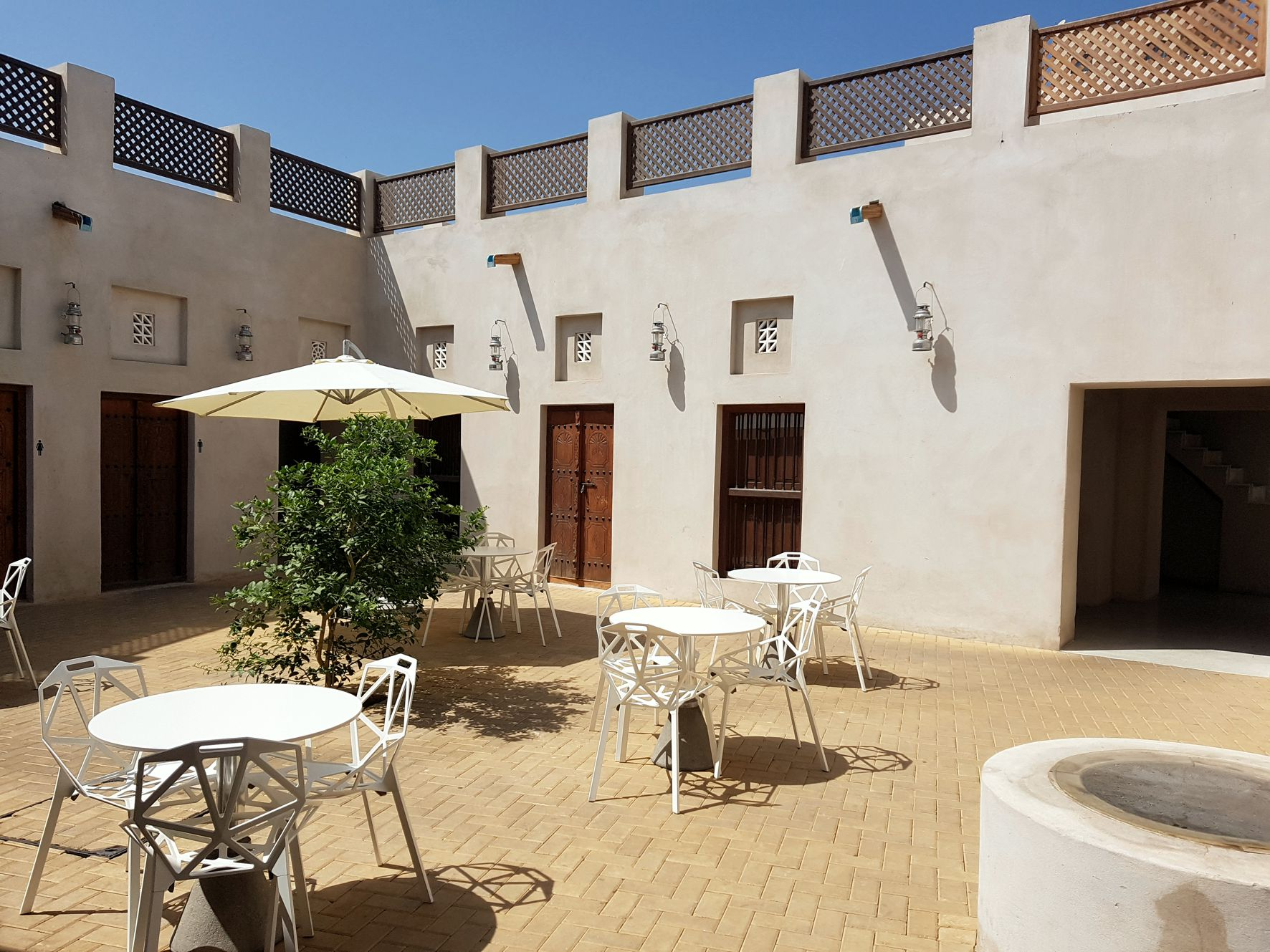
A courtyard of a traditional adobe and coral house in the Heart of Sharjah district (part of Fen Café).

The almost complete demolition of Sharjah fort, which was originally constructed in 1820 by the then Ruler of Sharjah, Sheikh Sultan bin Saqr Al Qasimi, took place in January 1970. Sheikh Khalid bin Muhammad Al Qasimi wished to remove all trace of Sheikh Saqr bin Sultan Al Qasimi, the previous Ruler and was only prevented from completing the work by the return of his alarmed brother, Sultan bin Muhammad Al Qasimi, from his studies in Egypt.

Only a single tower remained, but Sultan, who was to himself to become Ruler of Sharjah in January 1972, kept many of the elements remaining from the demolition and restored the fort faithfully in works which started in January 1996 and were completed in April 1997. This work formed part of the first phase of works restoring the old souks and houses of Sharjah's old town centre.

== Al Bait Hotel ==
The current phase of the project is centred around the $53.5 million, 53-room Al Bait Hotel, a five star luxury hotel build around four heritage houses, including the Bait Ibrahim Mohammed Al Midfa and majlis, which is intended to launch in December 2018. The hotel is managed by GHM Hotels, known for its Chedi hotel brand. The houses are of traditional construction, single story with coral and gypsum walls and teak and barasti (palm frond) ceilings. The hotel was first announced in 2013 and slated for 2015 completion.

The Heart of Sharjah project includes restaurants, retail areas, art galleries, themed markets, archaeological sites, museums, play areas and commercial offices. Construction includes the reconstruction and renovation of historical buildings for a variety of uses as well as the construction of new buildings.

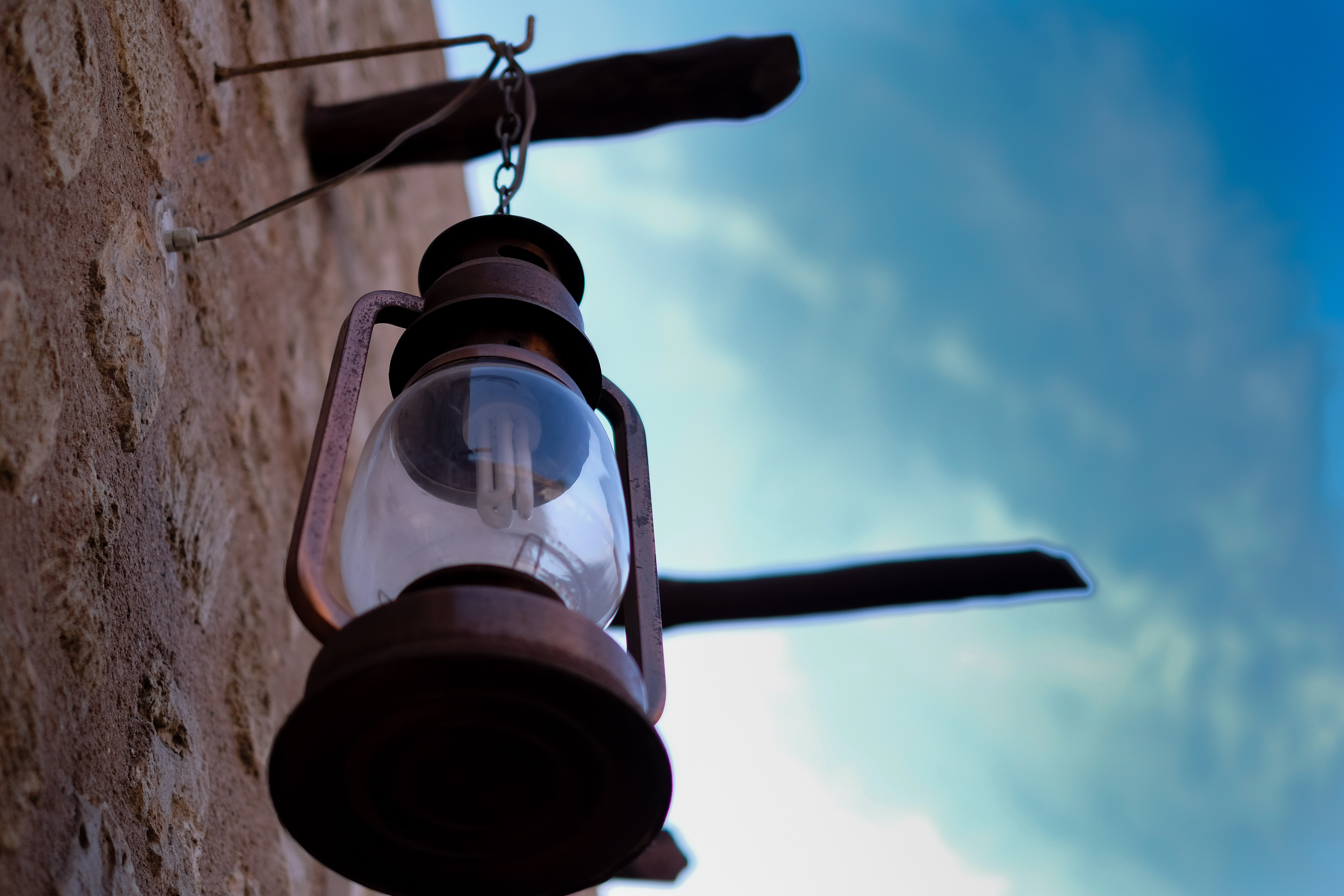
Old Lanter in Heart Of Sharjah

Part of the project will involve the demolition of the iconic 1970s buildings lining Sharjah's 'Bank Street', designed by Spanish architects Tecnica y Proyectos (TYPSA).

== UNESCO bid ==
Sharjah's 2018 bid for UNESCO World Heritage Status, under the heading 'Sharjah, Gateway to the Trucial States' includes the Heart of Sharjah; Sharjah Fort; the former barracks of the Trucial Oman Scouts in Mirgab; Al Mahatta Fort, the first airport in the Arab states of the Persian Gulf; Dhaid Fort and Oasis; the coastal town of Khor Fakkan; the oasis and settlement of Wadi Helo and Fili Fort, following the Heart of Sharjah theme of a return to the simplicity and natural lifestyles of the 1950s. The bid for UNESCO status has been discussed since 2014.
