= Abu Shagara =

Populated area in Sharjah, UAE

Abu Shagara أبو شغارة
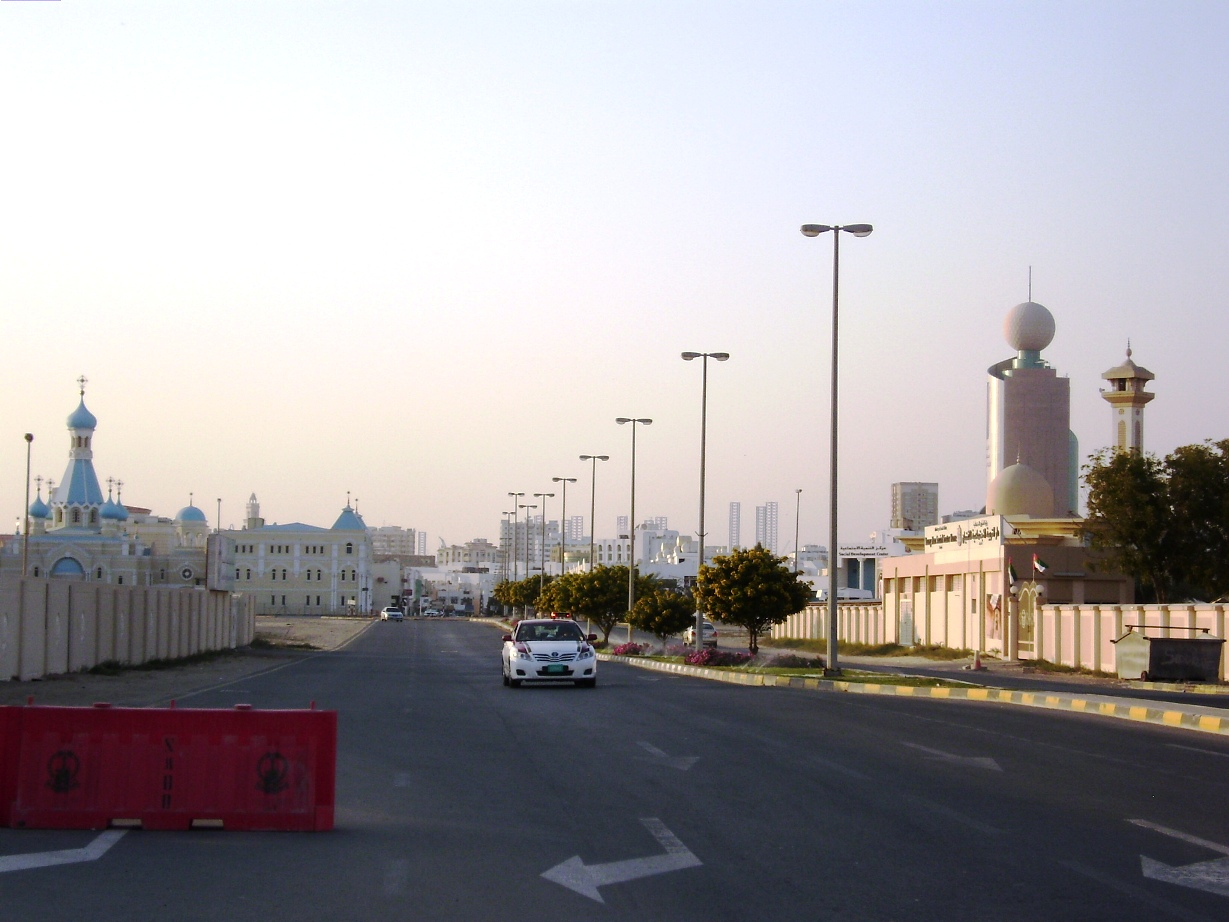
- Abu Shagara, Sharjah
- Interactive map of Abu Shagara
- Coordinates: 25.336307°N 55.395949°E
- Country: United Arab Emirates
- Emirate: Sharjah
- City: Sharjah

Population
  - Total: 30,000

Abu Shagara or Bu Shaghara is a populated residential area in the emirate of Sharjah, UAE. It is one of the thickly populated areas of the Emirates. One of the biggest parks is Abu Shagara Park.

== Neighbourhoods ==
- Al Yarmook
- King Faisal Street Sharjah
- Al Nad
- Al Qasimia
- Rolla Sharjah
