= Sahara Centre =

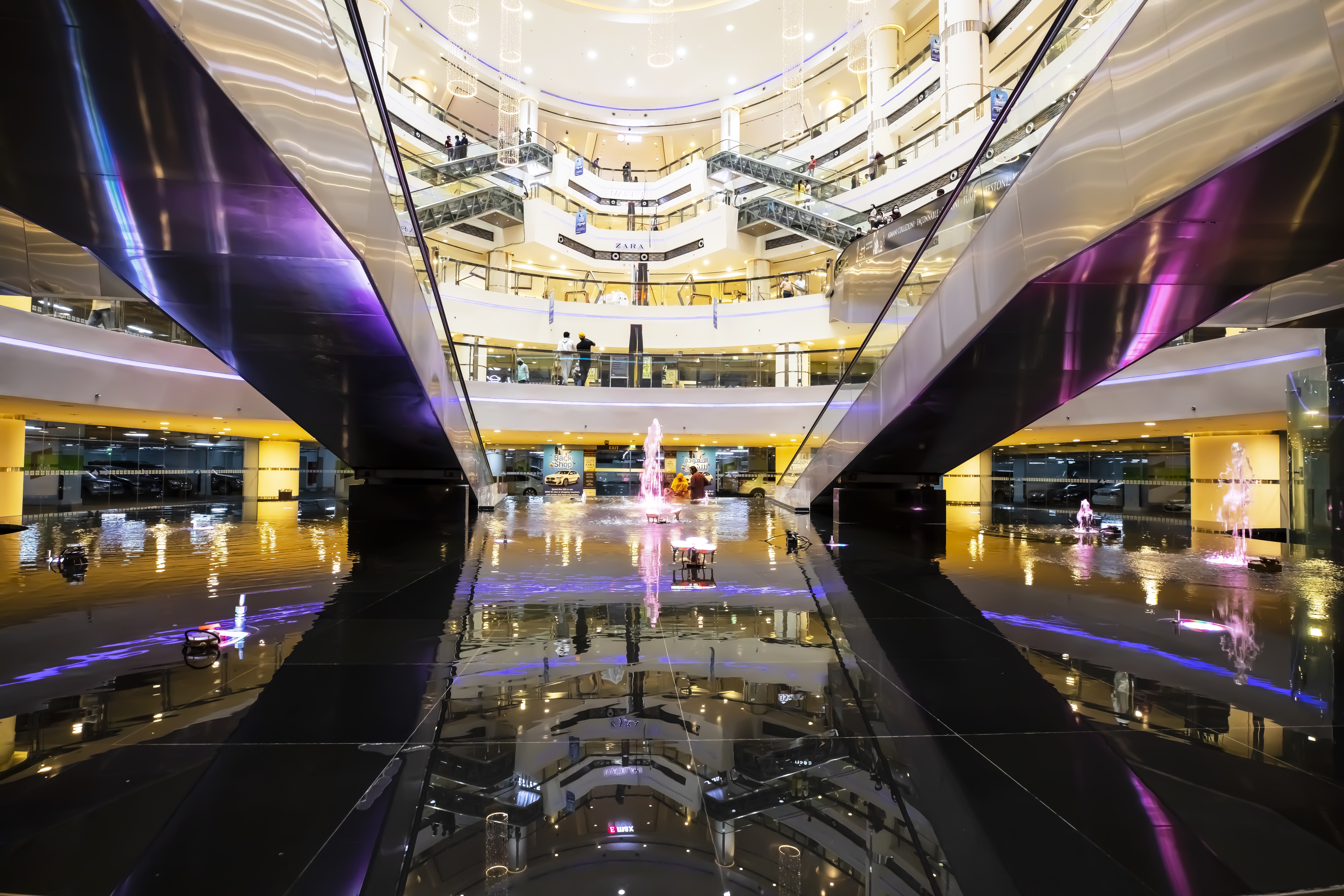
- Location: Sharjah, United Arab Emirates
- Coordinates: 25°17′51″N 55°22′20″E
- Opened: 1 February 2002; 24 years ago
- Website: www.saharacentre.com

Sahara Centre is a shopping mall located in Sharjah, United Arab Emirates, established on 1 February 2002. The Sahara Centre has a total area of 2,583,878 sq.ft with 4,500 covered and open parking spaces containing 530 retail outlets. It is situated on the Dubai-Sharjah highway, near areas such as Al Nahda. The mall features a variety of shopping outlets, dining options, and entertainment facilities, attracting visitors from both Sharjah and Dubai.

The architectural design of Sahara Centre includes a distinctive tent and wooden beam roof structure, complemented by a circular glass entrance.

In 2013, Sahara Centre underwent a significant expansion, adding one million square feet of space. The expansion introduced new facilities, restaurants, and additional stores. Notable additions include 120 new retail spaces featuring brands such as Matalan, Emax, Fitness First, and Baby Shop.

Sahara Centre houses retail outlets spanning multiple categories, including fashion, cosmetics, toys, perfumes, jewelry, and textiles, according to its official directory. Sahara Centre provides various entertainment options. Adventureland is a theme park within the mall, featuring rides and attractions. The hub is an entertainment center with a skating rink, VR simulators, video games, and classic games like foosball and billiards. The dining facilities include fast-food outlets, casual restaurants, and cafés, catering to diverse dietary preferences. According to the mall's official directoryThe Sahara Centre's food court and restaurants offer a variety of international cuisines, including Italian, Chinese, Iranian, Indian, and Arabic.

== Redevelopments ==
In 2013, Sahara Centre underwent a significant expansion, adding one million square feet of space. The expansion introduced new facilities, restaurants, and additional stores. Notable additions include 120 new retail spaces featuring brands such as Matalan, Emax, Fitness First, and Baby Shop.

== See also ==
- List of shopping malls in Dubai
