= Roads & Transport Authority (Sharjah) =

Transportation authority in Sharjah, United Arab Emirates

Roads & Transport Authority - Sharjah
- هيئة الطرق والمواصلات الشارقة

Agency overview
- Formed: 2014; 12 years ago
- Jurisdiction: Emirate of Sharjah
- Headquarters: Al Azra, Sharjah, United Arab Emirates
- Agency executives: Abdelaziz Mohamed Aljarwan, Director of Transport Affairs; Eng. Sulaiman Abdelrahman Al Hajri, Director of the Authority for Road Affairs
- Website: www.srta.gov.ae

The Sharjah Roads & Transport Authority (Arabic: هيئة الطرق والمواصلات الشارقة), commonly known as SRTA, is the sole major independent government roads & transportation authority in the Emirate of Sharjah, United Arab Emirates. It was founded in 2014 to keep pace with development and rapid growth within the emirate.

== History ==
In February 2024, SRTA and Oman National Transport Company – Mwasalat signed an agreement to launch an international route (the second one in the country) from Sharjah to Muscat via the Khatmat Malaha border post.

== Services ==
SRTA adds some new traffic regulations in 2025 and offers many services which are similar to its counterpart in Dubai such as:

- Public Transport (managed by KGL PTS)
- Roads Service
- Sayer Card
- Intercity & International Transport

=== City bus routes ===
As of 2024, the current routes are:

Route	Terminus	Terminus
1	Rolla Terminal	Sahara Centre
3	Rolla Terminal	Safari Mall
7	Sahara Mall via Sharjah Aquarium	Rolla Terminal
8	Rolla Terminal	Sahara Mall
9	Rolla Terminal	Sahara Mall
14	Al Sharq Terminal	Sharjah Airport
15	Rolla Terminal	Sharjah Airport
77	Muwailah Terminal	Al Saja'a Terminal
88	Rolla Terminal	Al Saja'a Terminal
99	Jubail Terminal	Sharjah Airport

=== Express and internal routes ===
Express routes usually end with an "X" in it (Example: 14X), while internal routes usually have letters before the number (Example: E1), the routes are:

Route	Terminus	Terminus
14X	Rolla Terminal	Muwailah
88X	Rolla Terminal	Al Saja'a Terminal
E1	Al Jubail Terminal	Sharjah Aquarium
F1	Al Saja’a Big Bazaar	Noor Al Saja’a Supermarket
F2	Al Sajaa Big Bazaar	Al Sajaa Tasheel Centre
F7	Rolla Terminal	Al Jubail Terminal

== See also ==
- Al Jubail Terminal
- Roads & Transport Authority (Dubai)
- Sharjah International Airport
