= Downtown Sharjah =

Downtown Sharjah وسط مدينة الشارقة Al Majaz
- Community
- The Downtown Sharjah
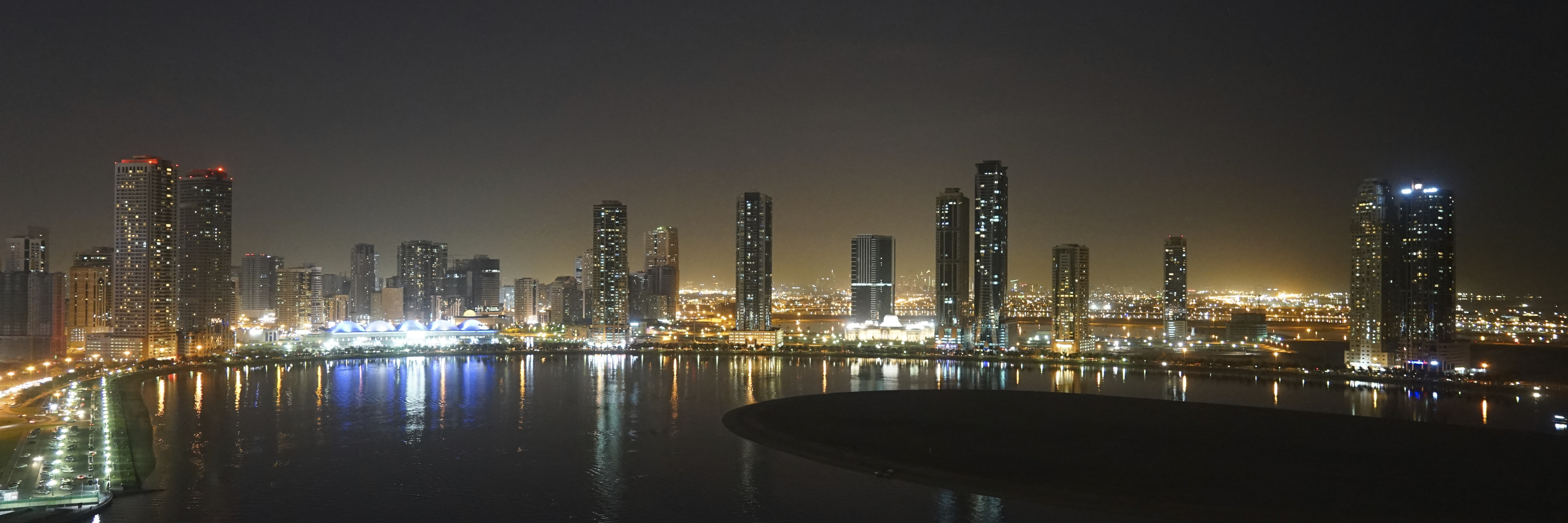
- Al Khan Lagoon

- Location within United Arab Emirates
- Coordinates: 25.3266°N 55.3854°E
- Country: 'UAE'
- Emirate: Emirate of Sharjah
- City: Sharjah

Area
  - Total: 3.34 km^{2} (1.29 sq mi)

Population 2015
  - Total: 116,503
  - Density: 34,900/km^{2} (90,300/sq mi)

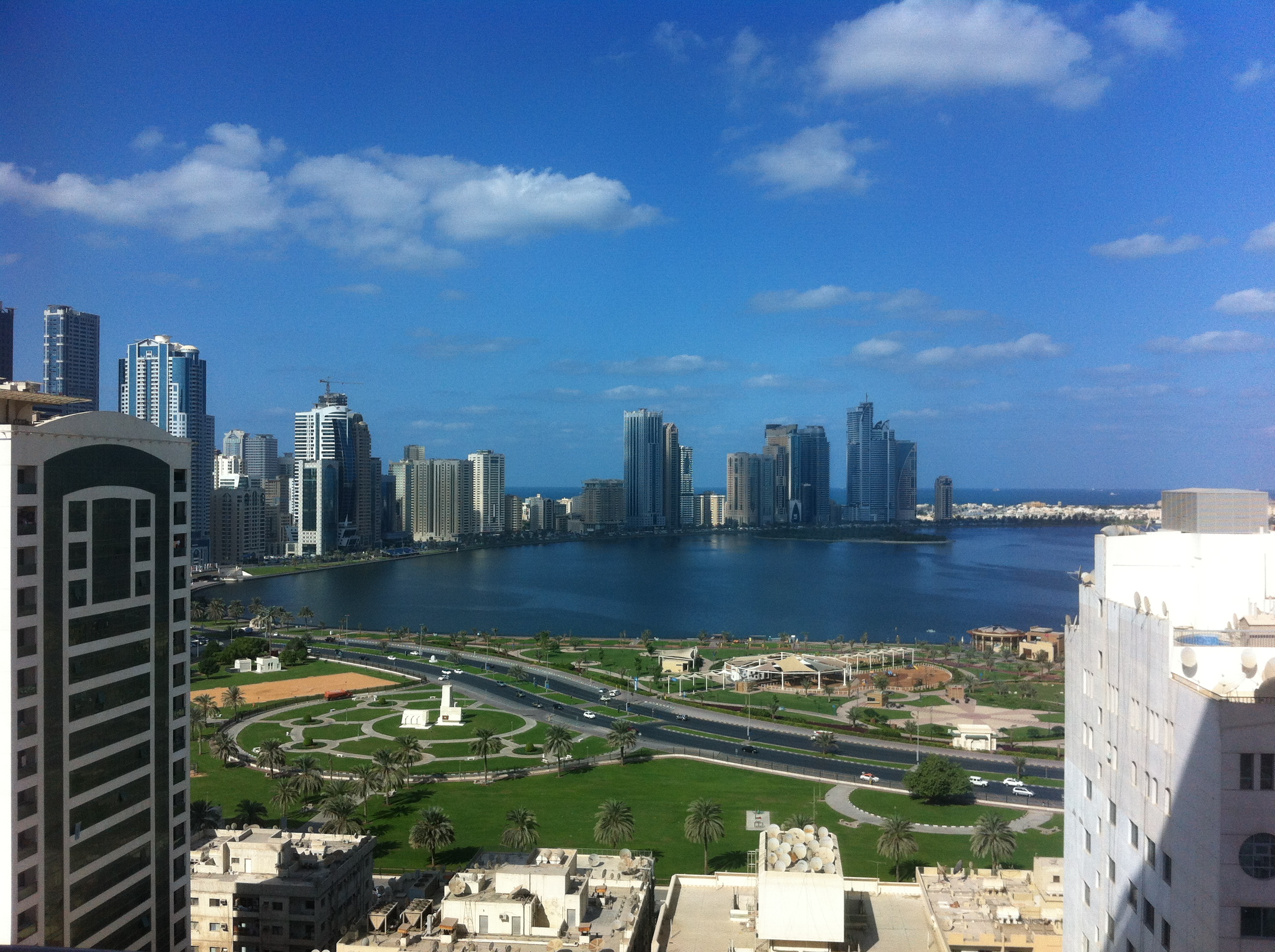
Al Majaz, Downtown Sharjah, United Arab Emirates, 2012

Downtown Sharjah or Sharjah City, Al Majaz is a large-scale, mixed-use complex in Sharjah, United Arab Emirates. It is home to some of the city's notable landmarks, including City Centre Sharjah, Al Noor Island, Al Qasba and Al Majaz Waterfront and Al Montazah Parks.

Sharjah Downtown has permanent residents, with residential areas built between the 1990s and the present. There are also a couple of hotels.

== Landmarks ==
- Khalid lagoon
- Al Majaz 1 (0.90 km², northeast side of Khalid lagoon, with The Bird Island)
- Al Majaz 2 (1.14 km², southeast side of Khalid lagoon)
- Al Majaz 3 (0.98 km², west side of Khalid lagoon, with Amphitheatre island)
- Al Majaz Waterfront
- Al Majaz Amphitheatre Island
- Al Noor Island
- Al Qasba Canal
- The Flag Island
- Al Montazah Parks
- Al Khan Lagoon
- Maryam Island
