= Rolla Sharjah =

Rolla Sharjah رولا الشارقة
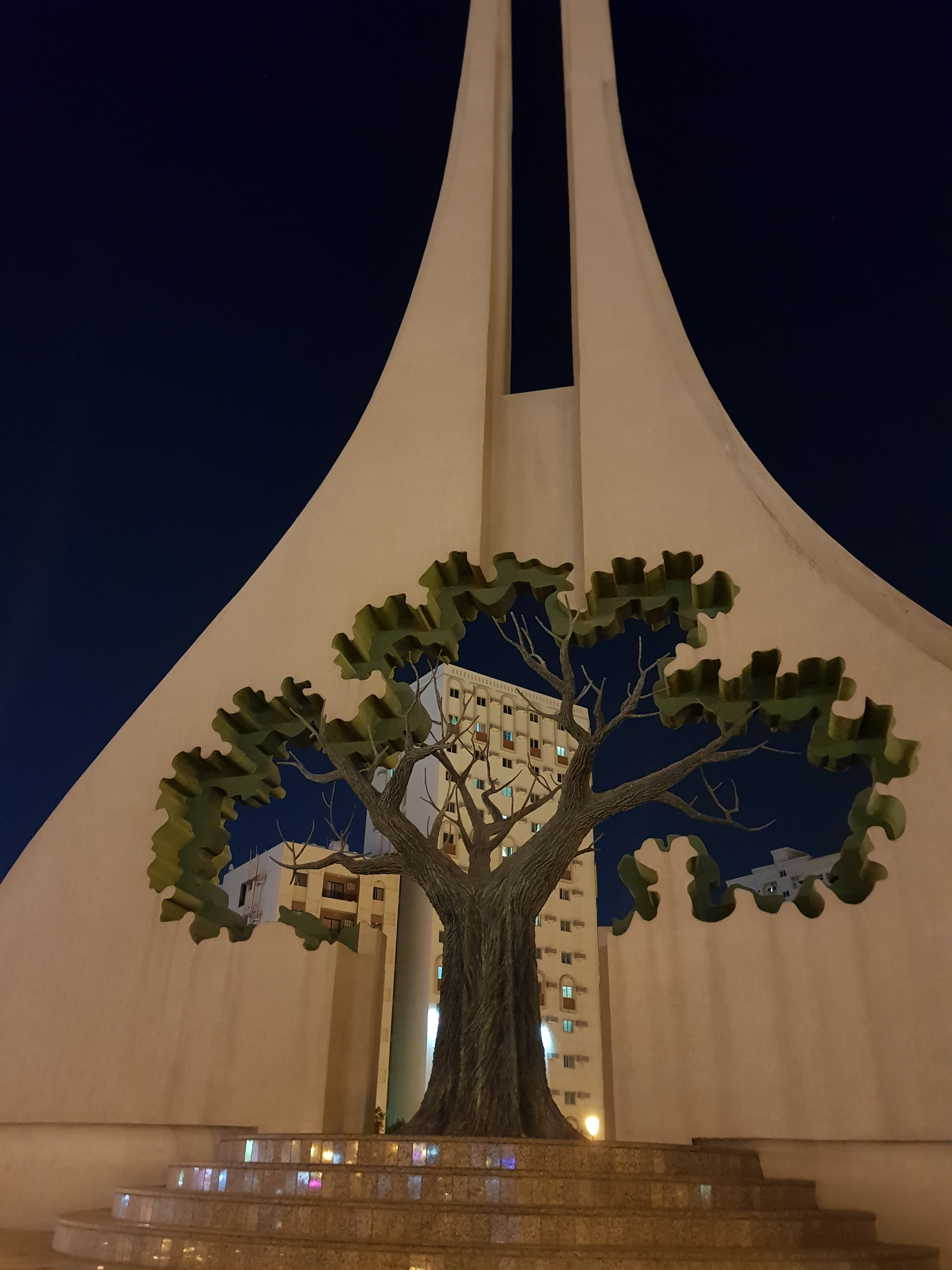
- Rolla Park - Sharjah
- Interactive map of Rolla Sharjah
- Coordinates: 25.358350°N 55.389294°E
- Country: United Arab Emirates
- Emirate: Sharjah
- City: Sharjah

Population
  - Total: 200,000

Rolla or Rolla Sharjah (in Arabic: رولا) is a landmark and city within the city of Sharjah, United Arab Emirates.

== Population ==
Rolla has a population of 200,000 which consists of 20% of Sharjah's total population

== Economy ==
The city contains 30% of Sharjah's trading locations and 10% of its GDP. A large portion of its earnings come from the historic Dress, gold, and spice souqs.

== Places of interest ==
- Rolla Square Park
- Rolla Market

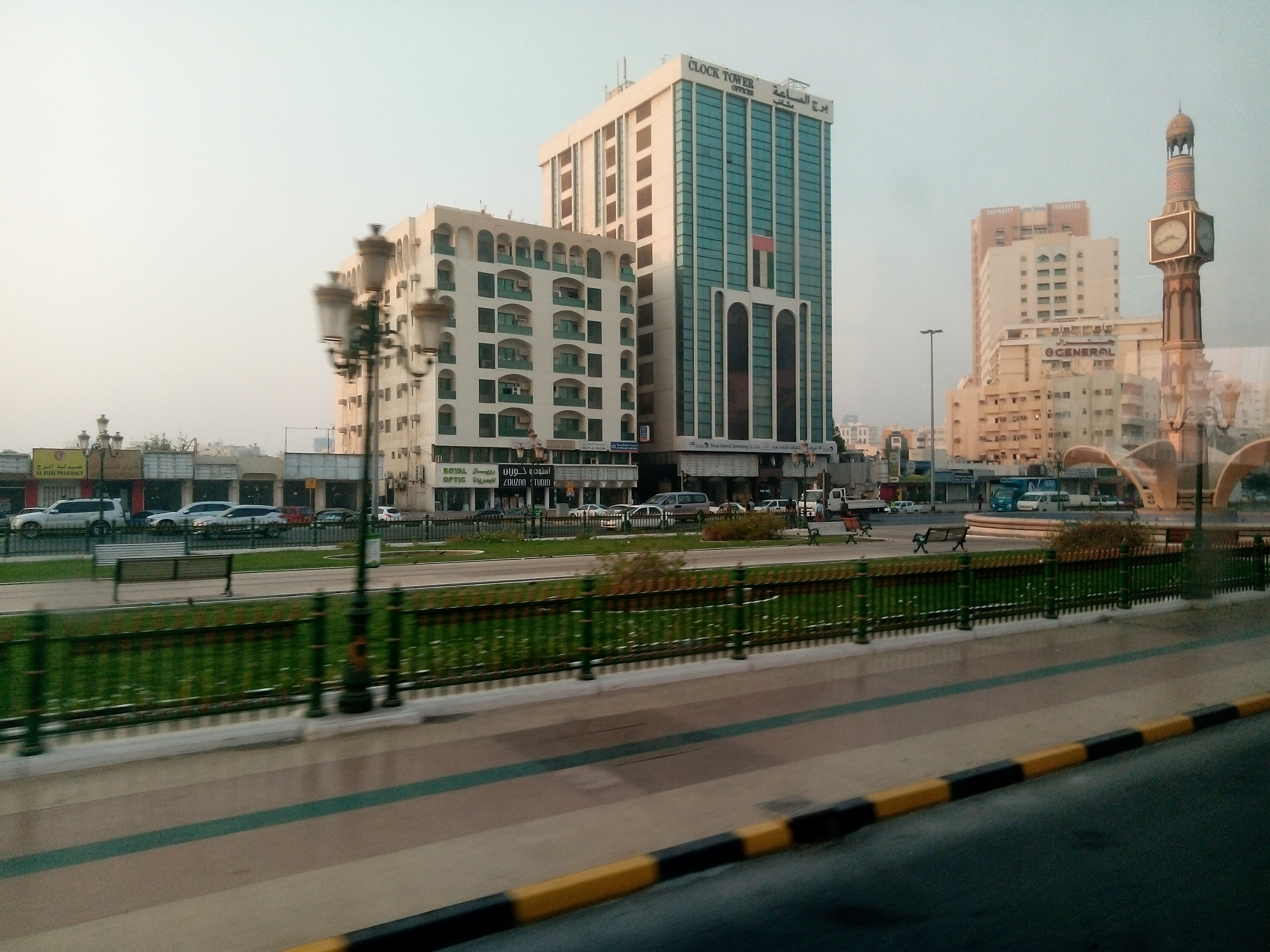
Rolla, Clock tower

== Neighbourhoods ==
- Butina, Sharjah
