= List of museums in the United Arab Emirates =

The following museums are located in the United Arab Emirates.

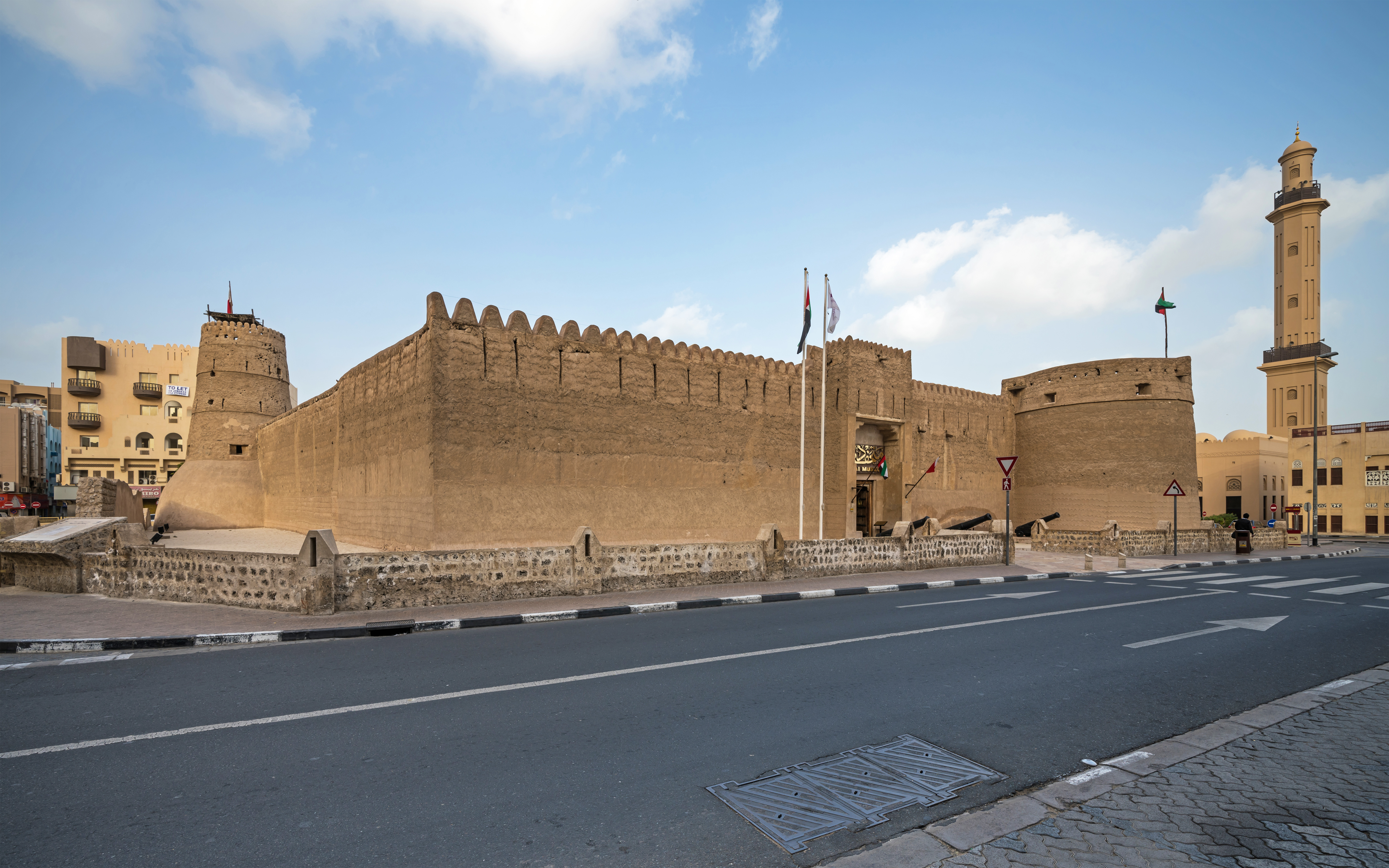
Dubai Museum

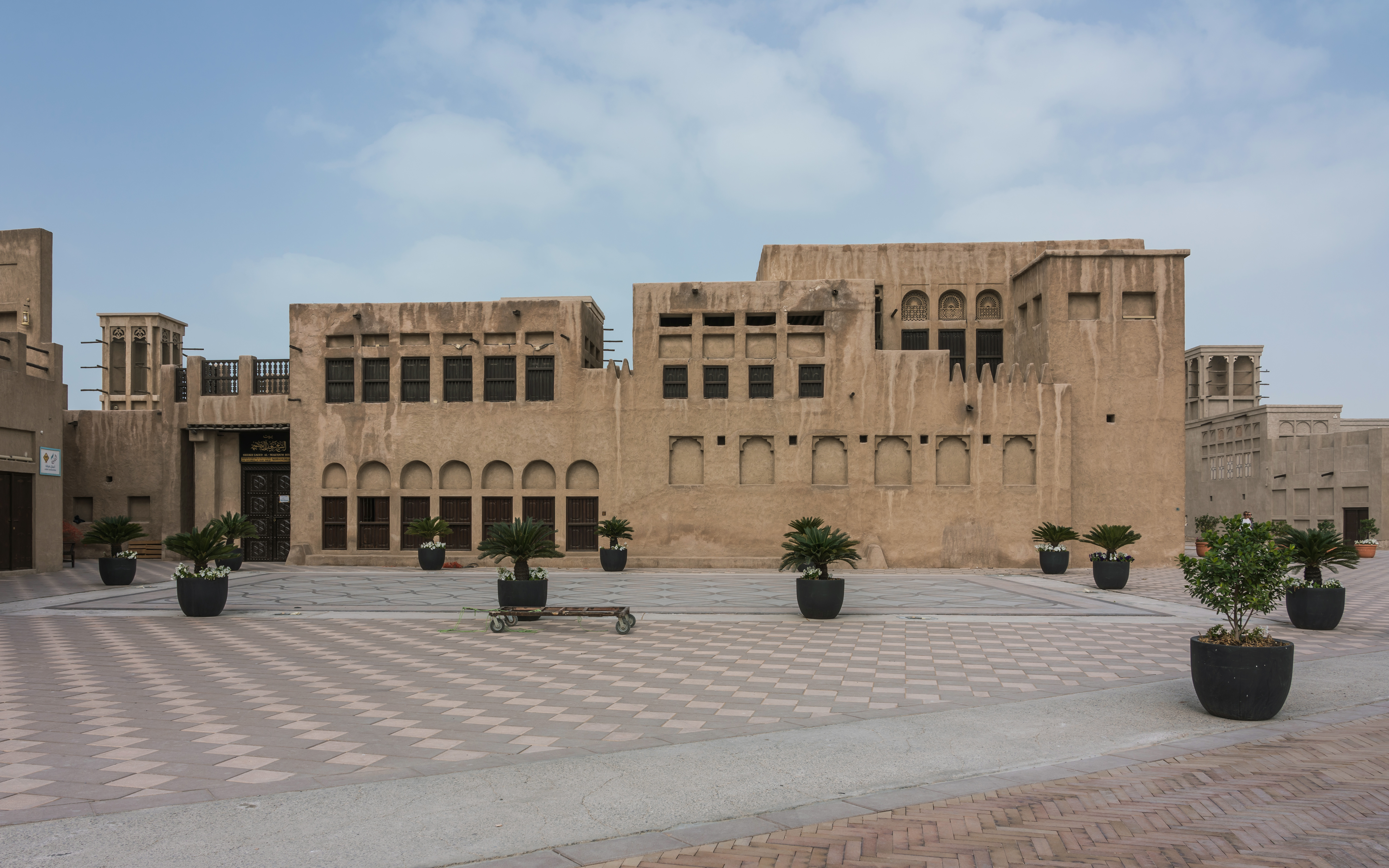
Saeed Al Maktoum House

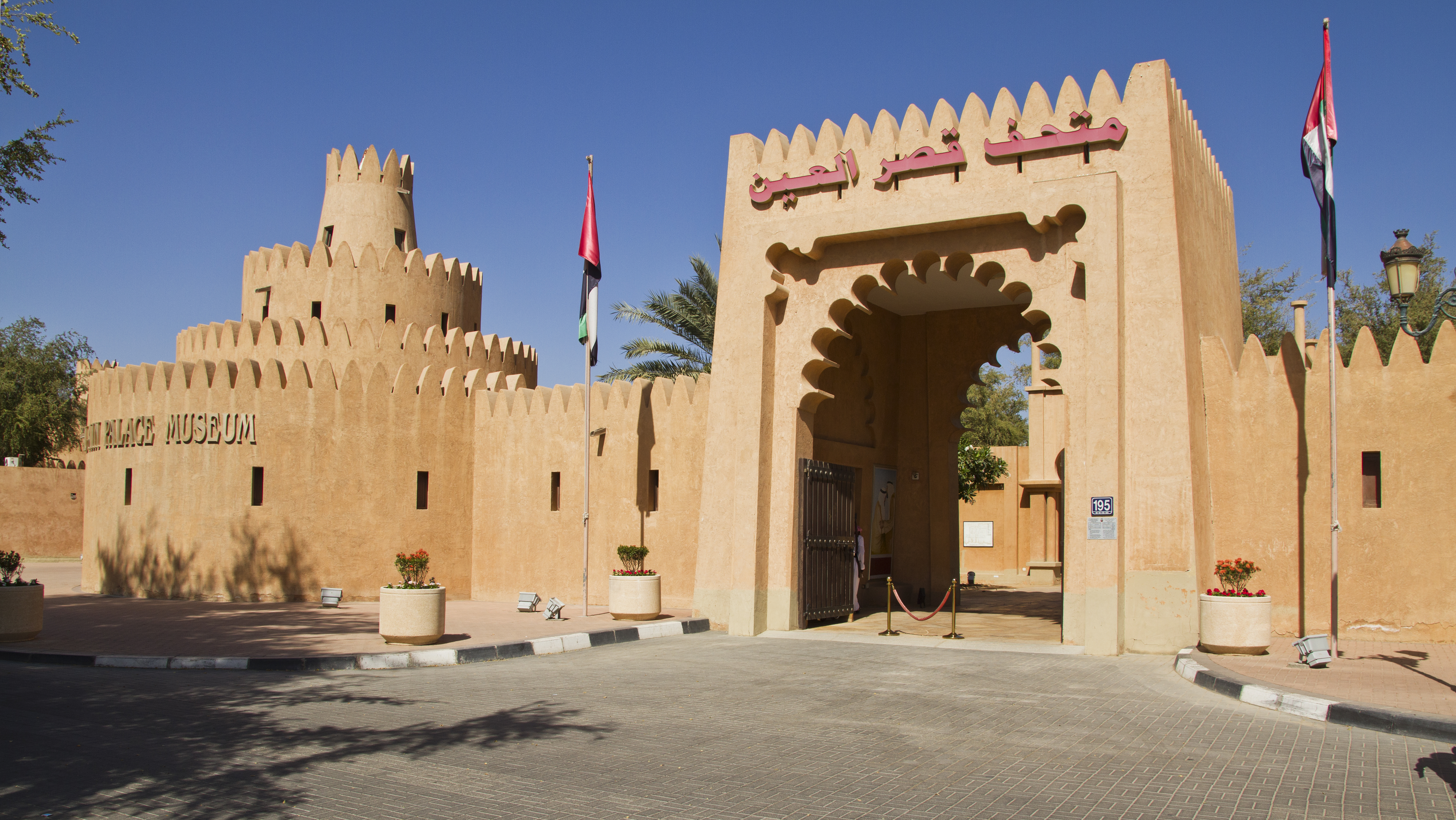
Sheikh Zayed Palace Museum

- Al Ahmadiya School
- Al Ain National Museum
- Al Mahatta Museum
- Al Eslah School Museum
- Al Hisn Fort Museum
- Camel Museum
- Dubai Museum
- Dubai Coins Museum
- Etihad Museum
- Fujairah Heritage Village
- Fujairah Museum
- Guggenheim Abu Dhabi
- Louvre Abu Dhabi
- Natural History Museum Abu Dhabi
- Saeed Al Maktoum House
- Salsali Private Museum
- Salwa Zeidan Gallery
- Sharjah Art Museum
- Sharjah Archaeology Museum
- Sharjah Calligraphy Museum
- Sharjah Heritage Museum
- Sharjah Museum of Islamic Civilization
- Sharjah Maritime Museum
- Sharjah Science Museum
- Sheikh Obaid bin Thani House
- Sheikh Zayed Palace Museum
- Madame Tussauds Dubai
- Museum of Illusions
- Museum of the Future

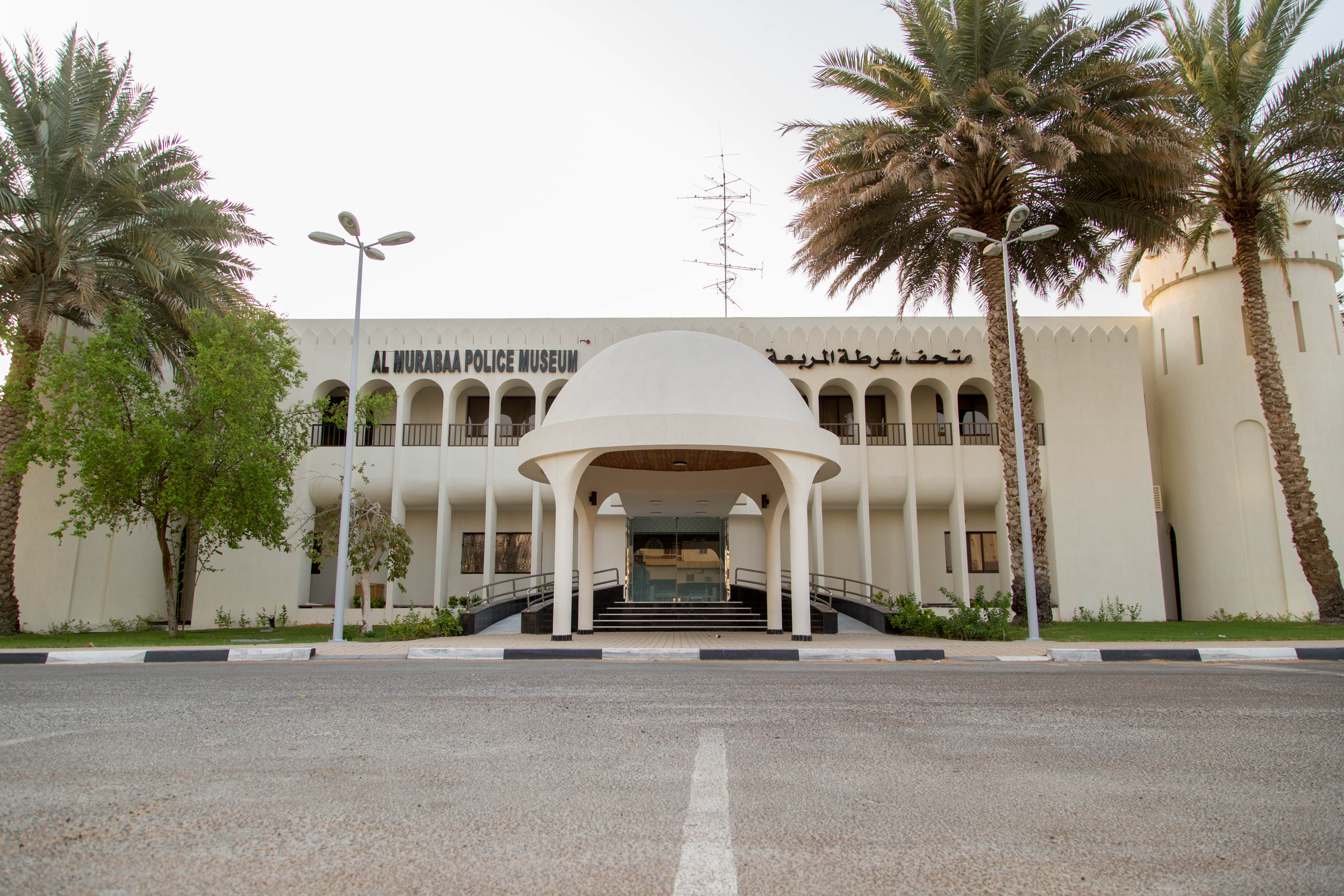
Al murab'a police museum متحف شرطة المربعة

- Zayed National Museum

== See also ==
- List of museums
- Culture of the United Arab Emirates
