= Sharjah Museums Authority =

Museum organization in the United Arab Emirates

Emirate of Sharjah Sharjah Museums Authority (SMA)
- هيئة متاحف الشارقة

Agency overview
- Formed: 2006
- Jurisdiction: Sharjah
- Headquarters: Sharjah, United Arab Emirates; 25.3471°N 55.3726°E
- Agency executives: Maissa Saif Saeed Al Suwaidi, Director General; Dr. Sheikh Sultan bin Muhammad Al-Qasimi, Founder
- Website: www.sharjahmuseums.ae

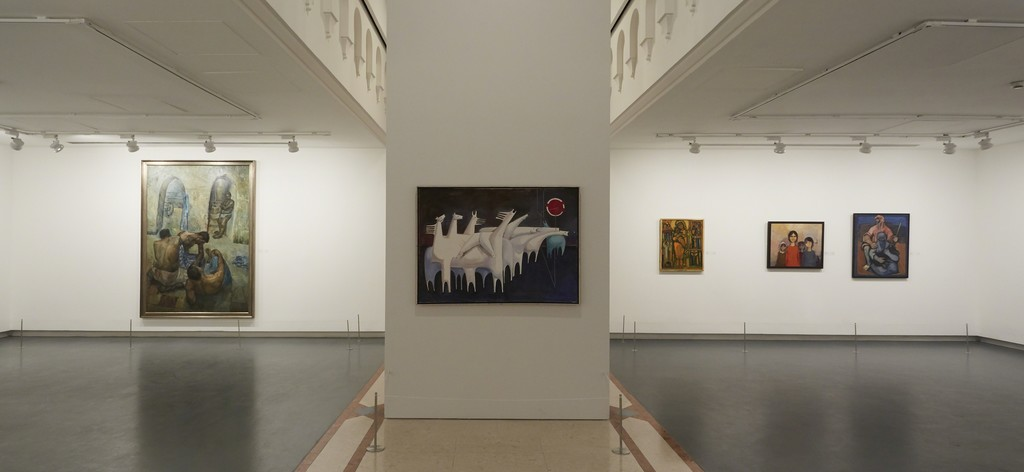
A Century in Flux exhibition at the Sharjah Art Museum is a collaboration between Barjeel Art Foundation and the Sharjah Museums Authority

The Sharjah Museums Authority (SMA), formerly known as the Sharjah Museums Department (SMD), is a cultural beacon of Sharjah, United Arab Emirates.

The organization was established by Dr. Sheikh Sultan bin Muhammad Al-Qasimi in 2006. The authority's objective is to promote the emirate's legacy of arts, heritage and culture. It is a part of the Global Cultural Districts Network. SMA oversees a number of museums and heritage sites in the Emirate of Sharjah, including:

- Al Eslah School Museum
- Al Mahatta Museum
- Al Qasimia Museum
- Bait Al Naboodah
- Bait Skeikh Saeed Bin Hamad Al Qasimi
- Calligraphy Museum
- Hisn Khorfakkan
- Resistance Monument
- Sharjah Aquarium
- Sharjah Archaeology Museum
- Sharjah Art Museum
- Sharjah Calligraphy Museum
- Sharjah Discovery Centre
- Sharjah Fort (Al Hisn)
- Sharjah Heritage Museum
- Sharjah Maritime Museum
- Sharjah Museum of Islamic Civilization
- Sharjah Science Museum

== See also ==
- Heart of Sharjah
- List of museums in the United Arab Emirates
