= List of tourist attractions in the United Arab Emirates =

This is a list of the popular tourist attractions in the United Arab Emirates, by Emirate, except for shared attractions, such as mountains shared by different emirates

== Abu Dhabi ==
- Central Region:
  - Sheikh Zayed Grand Mosque: founded by Sheikh Zayed bin Sultan Al Nahyan and competed in 2007, the Abu Dhabi mosque was constructed by the Italian company Impregilo using material from India, Italy, Germany, Morocco, Pakistan, Turkey, Malaysia, Iran, China, United Kingdom, New Zealand, Macedonia and United Arab Emirates.
  - Saadiyat Island: a big low-lying island 500 m (1,600 ft) off the coast of Abu Dhabi Island, and is currently under development. A mixed commercial, residential, and leisure project is currently under construction on the island, due to be completed in 2020.
  - Qasr al-Hosn: the oldest stone building in the city
  - Louvre Abu Dhabi: an art museum associated with the historic Louvre in Paris.
  - Al Reem Island: a residential, commercial and business project on the namesake island, a natural island 600 m (2,000 ft) off the coast of Abu Dhabi island.
  - Al Lulu Island: a 1,050 acres (420 ha) human-made island off the coast of Abu Dhabi island. It stretches from the Abu Dhabi Breakwater to the Zayed Sea Port. Land reclamation was completed in 1992.
  - Al-Bahr Tower: a mashrabiya-inspired development consisting of two 29-storey, 145 m (476 ft)–high towers. It is located at the intersection of Al Saada and Al Salam Streets.
  - Emirates Palace Hotel: a five star luxury hotel. It is situated over 1.3 km (0.81 miles) of private beach. 85 ha (210 acres) of lawns and gardens surround the hotel, as well 114 domes of 80 metres (260 feet) in height.
  - Emirates Park Zoo at Al-Bahiyah
  - Ferrari World: One of the largest theme parks in Abu Dhabi. Live shows, rides, shopping & food are the main highlights of this place.
- Eastern Region:
  - Al-Ain National Museum: a museum in the city of Al Ain, the oldest in the UAE, located next to the Eastern Fort. It is on the eastern side of Al Ain Oasis
  - The Jebel Hafeet Mountain Road: it is 7 km (23,000 ft) in length and about 1,200 m (0.75 miles) in elevation.
- Western Region:
  - The desert surrounding Liwa Oasis

== Ajman ==
- The Musfoot region: mountains and fertile valley southeast of Ajman city

== Dubai ==
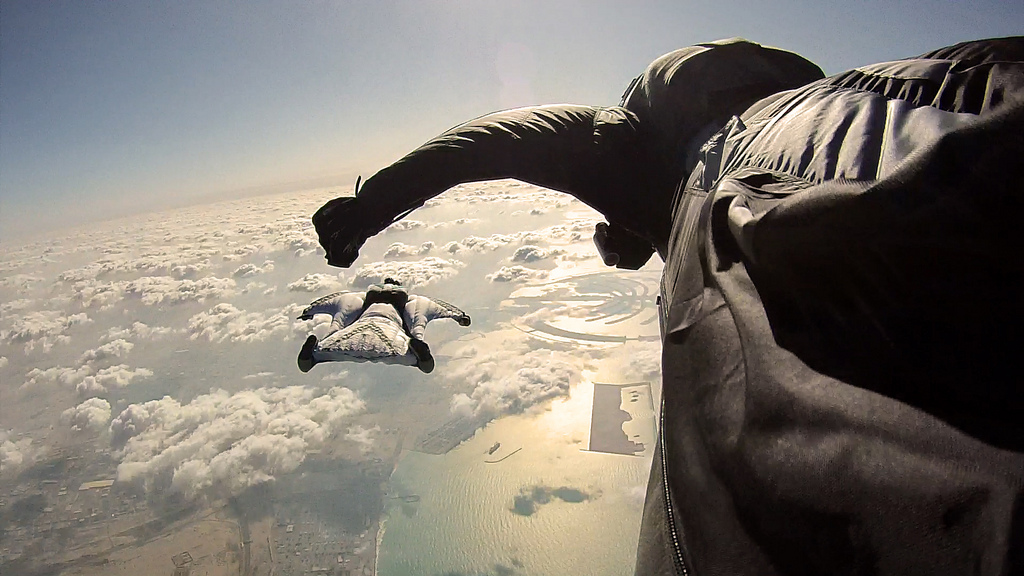
Wingsuit flying over the Palm Islands

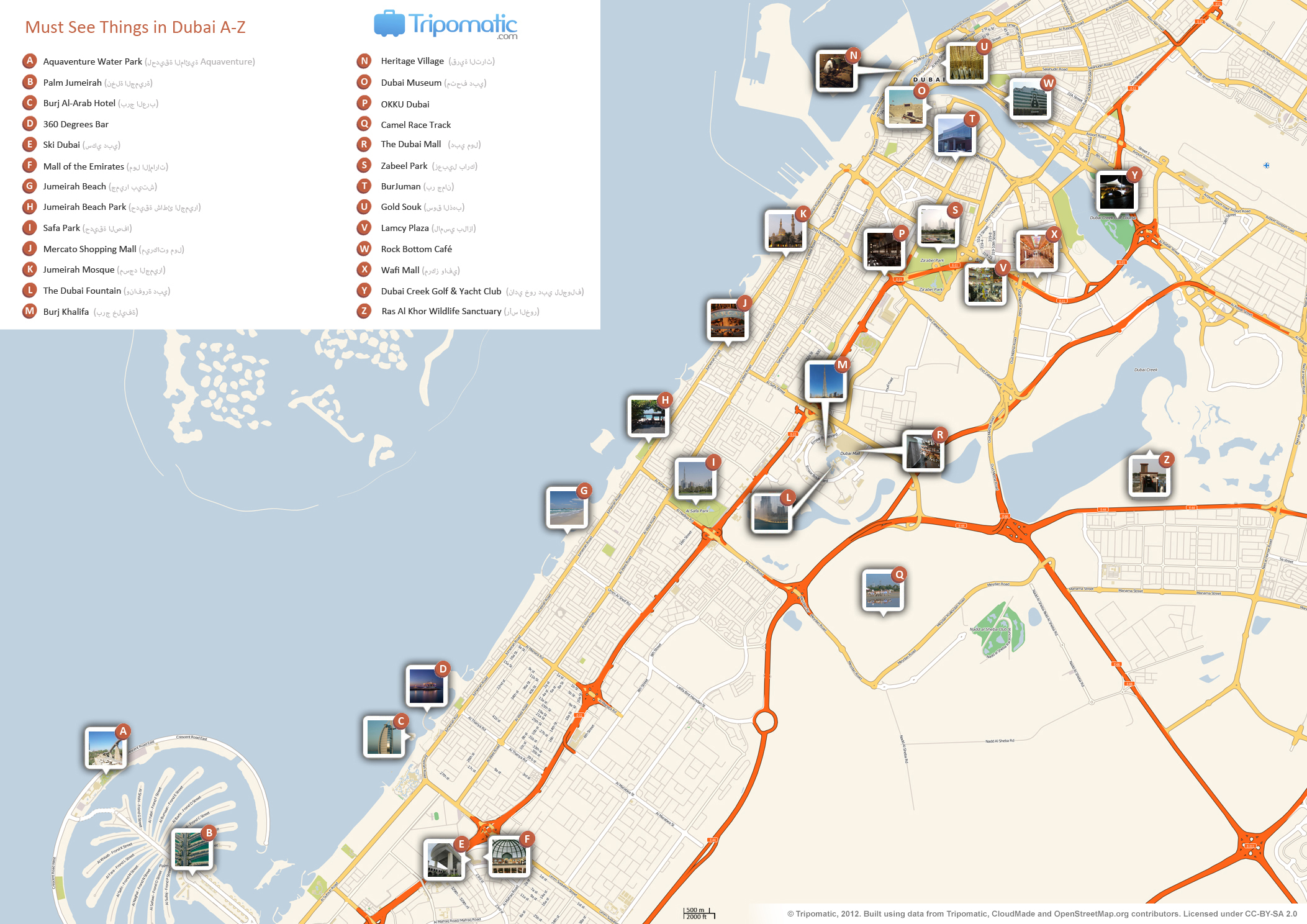
Map of tourist Attractions in Dubai

- Burj Khalifa: Spired 828 m (2,717 ft) skyscraper with a viewing deck, restaurant, hotel and offices and 11 ha (27 acres) park. Tallest human-made structure in the world.
- Burj Al Arab: a luxury hotel located in Dubai. At 321 m (1,053 ft), it is the fourth tallest hotel in the world
- The Dubai Frame is an observatory, museum, and monument in Zabeel Park, Dubai. It holds the record for the largest frame in the world.
- Ain Dubai: an observation wheel on Bluewaters Island, near the Dubai Marina in Dubai.
- Palm Jumeirah: The Palm Jumeirah is an artificial archipelago shaped like a palm tree, created using land reclamation by Nakheel which extends into the Persian Gulf.
- Museum of the Future is an exhibition space for innovative and futuristic ideologies, services, and products.
- Dubai Miracle Garden is one of Dubai's signature creations. Launched on Valentine's Day 2013, it sits in the heart of Dubai with a total area of .72,000 sq. M. The Dubai Miracle Garden won Guinness World Record for the largest vertical garden in 2013.
- The Dubai Fountain: is the largest choreographed fountain system in the world set on the 30 acres (12 ha) human-made Burj Khalifa Lake
- Al Fahidi Fort and Dubai Museum: the main museum in Dubai is located in the Al Fahidi Fort, built in 1787.
- Dubai Creek : the U-shaped natural sea water space in Dubai which is a tourist spot for Dhow cruising, Shopping and Sight seeing.
- Global Village (Dubai) : Global Village Dubai combine the world 90 countries cultures at one place.

== Fujairah ==
- Al Badiyah Mosque: the oldest mosque in use in the UAE. Tourists are not allowed inside.
- Fujairah Historic Fort: the oldest fort in the country. Built in 1670 and restored in the late 20th century
- Wadi Al-Wurayah: a Ramsar Wetland of International Importance, the 12,700 hectares (31,000 acres) area is located between the towns of Masafi, Khor Fakkan and Bidiyah.

== Ras al-Khaimah ==
- Ru'us al-Jibal in the Musandam Peninsula
  - Jebel Jais / Jabal Bil Ays, important mountain close to the border between Oman and UAE, with its summit in Oman
  - Jabal ar Raḩraḩ is the highest mountain in the United Arab Emirates, located entirely on its territory, 3.37 km southwest of Jebel Jais / Jebel Jais|Jabal Bil 'Ays (1,911 m), whose summit is, however, in the Musandam Governorate, in the Sultanate of Oman.
  - Jabal Raḩabah (Arabic: جبل رحبة) is a peak in the Hajar Mountains, northeast of the United Arab Emirates, in the Emirate of Ras Al Khaimah. At 1,543 m (5,062 ft), it is one of the highest peaks in the UAE, located entirely within the territory of the Emirates
  - Jabal Yibir / Jabal Al-Mebrah, located in the Western Hajar Mountains, sitting wholly within the UAE, it has a prominence of around 240 m (790 ft) from its parent peak, Jabal Harf Tila (1,568 m).

== Sharjah ==
- Dhaid Fort
- Sharjah Museum of Islamic Civilization
- Sharjah Art Museum
- Sharjah Cricket Stadium
- Adventureland

== Umm al-Quwain ==
- Bird watching at Khor al-Beidah and Al-Sinniyah Island

== Shared ==
- The Western Hajar Mountains, which includes Jebel Jais in the Emirate of Ras Al Khaimah, and Jebel Hafeet (sensu lato) in the Emirate of Abu Dhabi, and mountains in the Emirates of Ajman of Fujairah, and are shared with Oman

== See also ==
- Tourism in the United Arab Emirates
- Lists of tourist attractions
