= SMA5 =

SMA5 or variant, may refer to:

Sekolah Menengah Atas 5 (High School #5)

- SMA Negeri 5 Parepare (Parepare State H.S. #5), a public (ie. state) high school in Parepare, South Sulawesi, Sulawesi Island, Indonesia

== See also ==
- SMAS (disambiguation)
- SMA (disambiguation)
