= Tourism in the United Arab Emirates =

Burj Khalifa, the tallest tower in the world and a major tourist attraction of the United Arab Emirates.

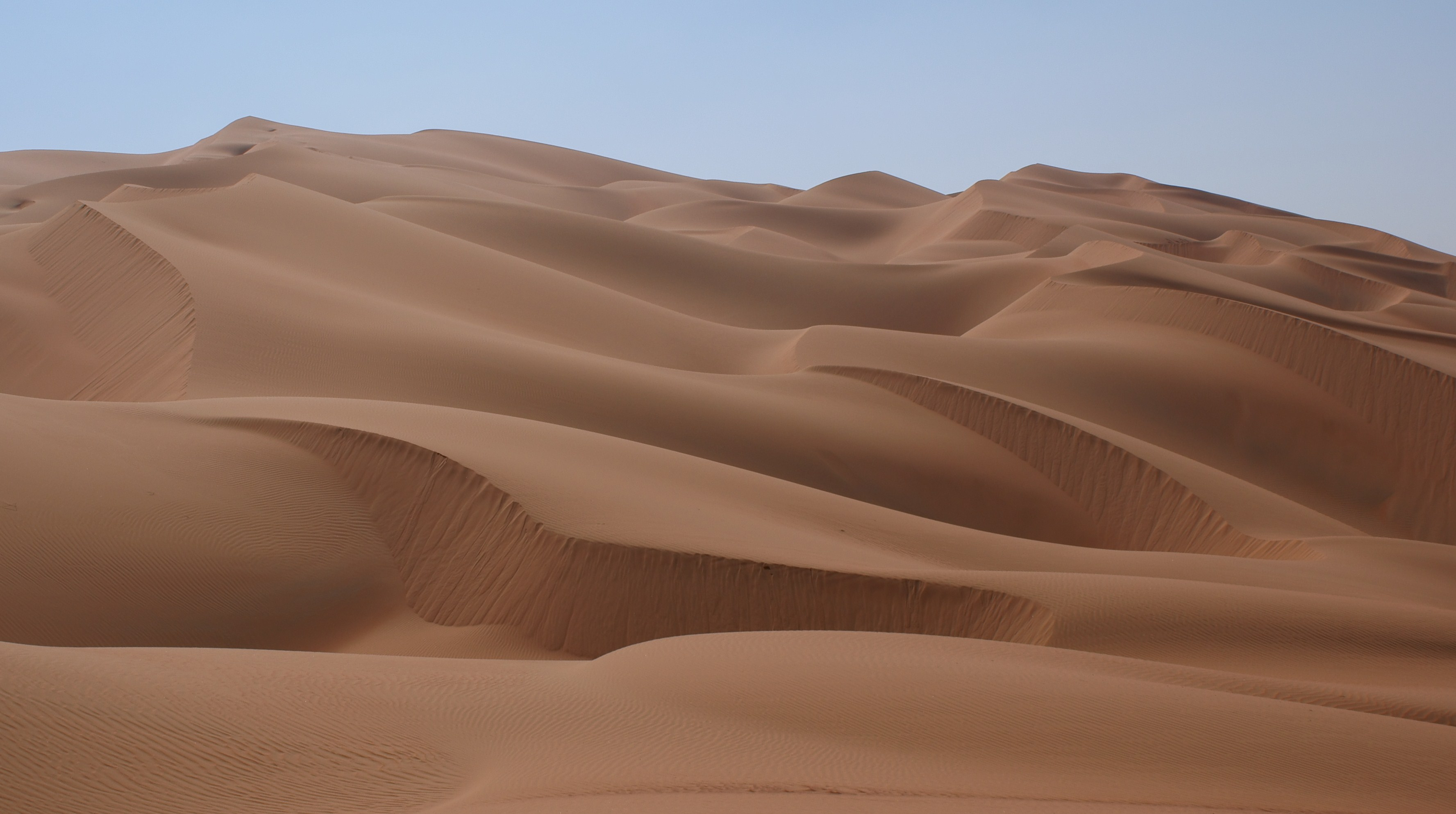
Rub al Khali desert on the outskirts of Liwa Oasis.

Tourism in the United Arab Emirates is an important part of the Emirati economy. In 2023, the tourism sector employed 809,300 people and contributed 220 billion dirham to the national gross domestic product (GDP), accounting for 12% of it. In 2024, the UAE was the 6th destination globally by international tourism receipts according to the World Tourism rankings, and it ranked 18th globally in the Travel and Tourism Development Index.

The country's major tourist attractions include the Burj Khalifa, Dubai Mall, and Palm Jumeirah in Dubai, Sheikh Zayed Grand Mosque and Yas Island in Abu Dhabi, Masfout, and Al Hajar Mountains in Fujairah.

== History ==
When the country was first formed in 1971 and freed from British control, the country itself did not have any sufficient tourist industry and the economic situation of the newly established nation was weak, despite massive oil wealth. Realizing the need to develop the country, and the awareness of oil limits, Sheikh Zayed bin Sultan Al Nahyan, who initiated the foundation of the UAE, envisioned the plan to diversify the country's economy, in which tourism was specifically regarded. The envision was eventually carried out, and in 1979, Sheikh Zayed opened the country's first-ever hotel, the Metropolitan Hotel Dubai located in Dubai.

The development of tourism in the United Arab Emirates was heavily linked to the development of tourism in Dubai, which was one of the earliest emirates in the country to open for tourists. Sheikh Rashid bin Saeed Al Maktoum, ruler of Dubai from 1958 till 1990, realised one day Dubai would run out of oil and started building an economy that would outlast it. Sheikh Rashid, together with Sheikh Zayed, was the instrumental leaders of leading the country's tourism, having made a joint declaration for the founding of the Emirates. In 1989 the Dubai Commerce and Tourism Promotion Board was established, to promote Dubai as a luxury destination for the up-tier market and influential business sectors. In January 1997, it was replaced with the Department of Tourism and Commerce Marketing (DTCM).

Since 2000s, the United Arab Emirates have experienced a significant tourist boom, and increasing life standard and quality made the expenditure on tourism to rise, thus making it more important to the national economy.

== Tourist destinations ==
=== Abu Dhabi ===
Sheikh Zayed Grand Mosque in Abu Dhabi

Abu Dhabi is the capital of the United Arab Emirates, and is the second most popular tourist destination in the country, under the management of Abu Dhabi Tourism Authority. This is also the center of Formula One race in the country, the Yas Marina Circuit. Nonetheless, the city is also famous for its landscapes, given its proximity to the Persian Gulf. There are over ten beaches functioning in the city serving for tourist purpose. The city is popular for its nightlife, more so than the more populous Dubai as it has lesser restriction and regular laws. Abu Dhabi will become the home of Disneyland Abu Dhabi, the first Disney theme park in the Middle East.

=== Dubai ===
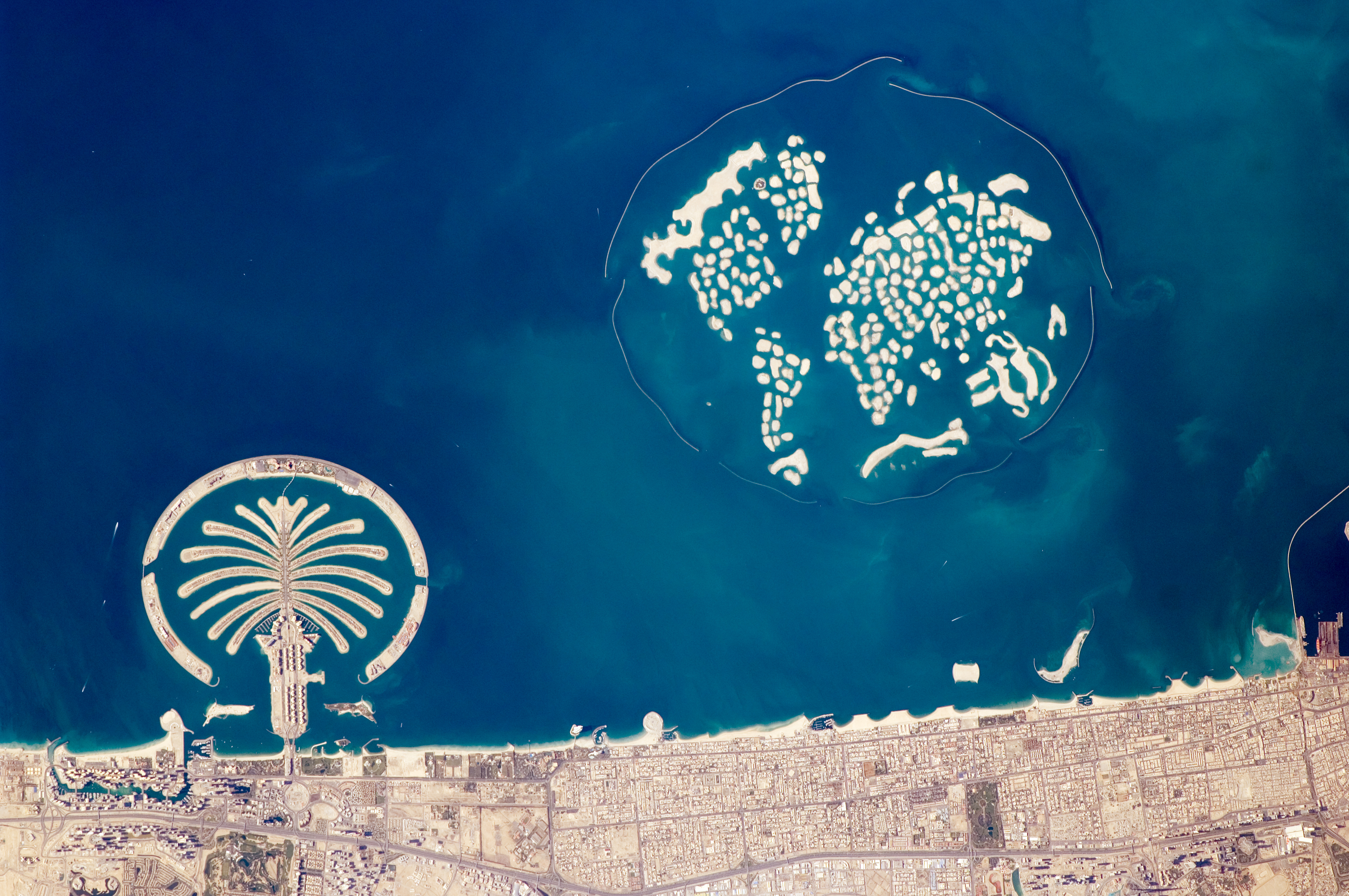
Archipelagoes in Dubai.

Dubai is the most visited city in the United Arab Emirates, the most expensive city in the GCC and one of the most expensive cities in the world. It is also the home of the two tallest towers in the world, the Burj Al Arab and Burj Khalifa, the latter occupies the top position. Nightlife in the city is also widely promoted. The city is often seen as a symbol of rapid tourist success in the nation. Its richness encompassed by the rapid development and the mix with the local Arab culture made it a popular destination for tourists to travel. However, lack of general tourism development remains an obstacle which the Emirati authorities have sought to tackle.

=== Fujairah ===
Fujairah shares the Al-Hajar Mountains with Ras Al Khaimah, a major tourist attraction in the country. Outside the Hajar Mountains, the Fujairah Fort, Bitnah Fort, Snoopy Island, Masafi and Al Hayl Castle are also attractive destinations. Fujairah holds a distinction for having a bull butting culture, a result of Portuguese colonization from 17th century.

=== Ras Al Khaimah ===
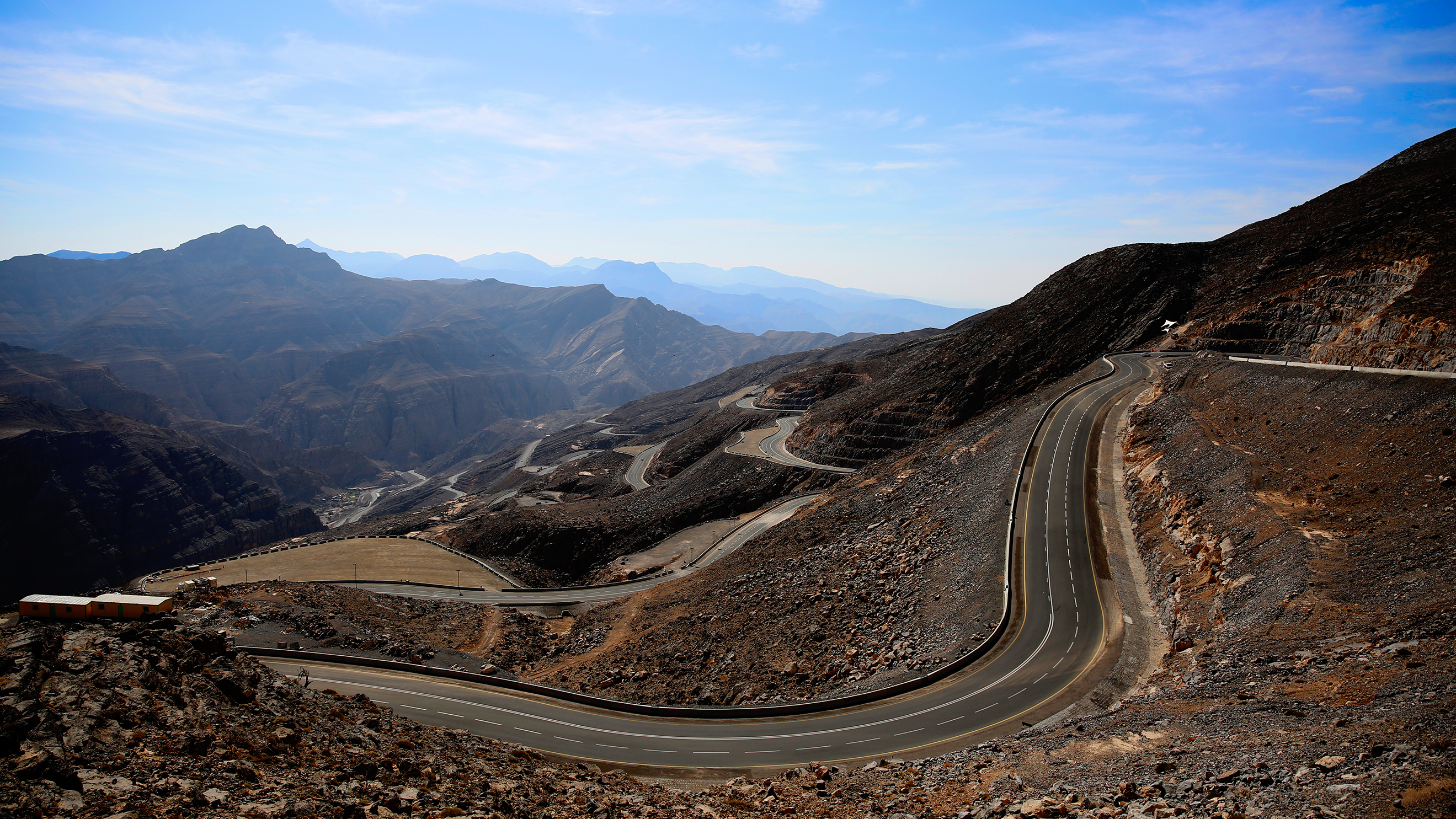
Jebel Jais, the highest mountain in the United Arab Emirates is part of Al Hajar Mountains.

Ras Al Khaimah is known for its natural landscape. The Al Hajar Mountains, in particular with mount Jebel Jais, the highest mountain of the country, offers views over craggy peaks down to the coastal plain, making this a common spot for photographers, particularly in the late afternoon when the orange-hued rocks glow. The world's longest zipline is also based in Ras Al Khaimah's Jebel Jais. Other include Dhayah Fort and its beach.

By 2027, Ras Al Khaimah will feature the first integrated resort and casino in the country when Wynn Al Marjan Island opens.

=== Sharjah ===
Sharjah is a major commercial center of the UAE. Sharjah is perhaps, among the most traditional tourist center, due to initiative efforts by the emirate's leadership to keep its spirit within the growing modernization. In 1998, Sharjah was awarded the "Cultural Capital of the Arab World" title by UNESCO representing the United Arab Emirates. Major destinations include the Sharjah Art Museum, Al Noor Mosque, Souk Al Markazi and Sharjah Heritage Area. A cultural heritage project, Heart of Sharjah, has been undertaken to preserve and restore the old town of Sharjah and return it to its 1950s state.

== Tourism statistics ==
=== International visitors ===
Yearly tourist arrivals in millions

Country	2020	2019	2018	2017	2016	2015
India	1,224,349	2,855,096	2,778,160	2,511,933	2,080,380	1,881,489
Oman	634,879	2,814,152	2,172,910	1,928,292	2,021,958	1,716,930
Saudi Arabia	512,875	1,897,471	1,993,646	1,876,316	1,921,916	1,662,435
Pakistan	418,973	840,222	819,683	763,396	767,724	671,847
United Kingdom	418,385	1,367,997	1,365,160	1,452,455	1,460,328	1,394,118
Russia	335,016	866,857	800,253	610,427	304,295	269,493
Germany	253,973	827,837	792,303	767,048	764,715	726,957
Egypt	238,226	357,084	328,049	297,658	302,560	301,952
United States	208,800	757,353	747,691	741,473	735,147	758,875
France	188,476	444,657	403,945	353,726	337,847	335,024
China	175,297	998,278	844,005	766,972	529,103	445,109
Italy	106,088	312,493	291,944	281,176	286,806	281,251
Philippines	104,438	378,423	375,938	379,754	365,749	322,297
Kuwait	98,576	378,109	399,795	463,708	492,360	489,425
Nigeria	79,630	250,568	172,476	128,676	145,725	162,086
Kazakhstan	78,072	164,219	140,801	93,968	89,723	85,625
Ukraine	73,819	154,001	123,221	83,670	77,397	70,154
Jordan	71,707	165,852	165,821	173,465	176,794	176,971
Canada	66,003	200,321	189,915	202,461	214,492	210,620
Bangladesh	63,674	158,108	132,931	31,350	31,529	39,179
Australia	63,371	297,709	305,320	331,450	353,390	389,702
Netherlands	61,432	170,484	170,018	169,829	163,662	171,496
Iraq	58,278	119,440	103,939	90,554	82,954	85,986
Spain	52,803	139,312	118,470	116,395	117,154	113,574
Bahrain	52,385	207,855	206,723	220,601	235,598	218,046
Iran	51,822	294,955	317,968	499,614	492,100	475,269
Lebanon	50,620	124,672	123,001	129,575	135,516	147,201
Indonesia	44,073	81,179	60,303	56,499	54,734	55,601
Poland	40,691	111,945	106,888	112,254	80,647	66,054
Afghanistan	39,784	75,721	44,777	34,181	28,659	51,984
South Korea	37,716	160,427	151,194	160,106	130,978	103,219
Belgium	36,619	87,110	78,870	74,983	73,775	71,379
Sweden	36,085	106,434	113,888	122,558	119,435	113,522
Romania	35,111	87,816	78,860	67,453	61,309	57,315
Brazil	34,655	105,141	85,822	78,312	54,362	59,950
Switzerland	34,111	120,623	121,675	121,399	108,782	110,785
Sri Lanka	33,539	102,200	90,455	85,474	84,013	77,295
Syria	31,972	69,876	49,979	48,270	60,212	67,943
South Africa	30,479	118,638	112,635	103,886	91,168	100,262
Turkey	29,930	86,077	87,322	97,302	97,464	94,448
Nepal	28,581	54,386	60,836	56,322	47,588	28,910
Uzbekistan	28,141	50,514	35,363	33,981	31,351	31,413
Algeria	28,120	97,693	76,211	58,397	58,356	46,767
Austria	27,630	78,751	74,857	72,779	72,587	79,293
Ireland	27,105	88,675	89,341	94,229	92,991	87,268
Japan	26,987	113,299	107,612	97,834	83,664	82,575
Uganda	24,748	60,780	49,272	41,721	35,059	30,010
Denmark	24,608	67,969	67,562	70,777	70,255	65,819
Morocco	22,537	66,526	57,229	50,818	45,708	40,170
Czech Republic	20,479	80,207	80,257	77,055	64,614	53,454

== Medical tourism ==
United Arab Emirates, especially Dubai, Abu Dhabi, Ras Al Khaimah is a popular destination for medical tourism. The Dubai Health authority has been spearheading medical tourism into UAE, especially Dubai. However, hospitals providing medical tourism are spread all over the seven emirates. UAE has the distinction of having the maximum number of JCI accredited hospitals (under various heads). UAE has inbound medical tourism as well as people going out for medical treatment. The inbound tourism usually is from African countries like Nigeria, Kenya, Uganda, Rwanda, etc. The outbound can be categorized into two segments - the local population (citizens of UAE) and the expats. The locals prefer to go to European destinations like the UK, Germany etc. The expats prefer to go back to their home countries for treatment.

== Tourism in the UAE during the 2026 Iran War ==
Tourism in the UAE has been significantly affected by the war, with thousands of hotel and flight cancelations in the first days of conflict. The country quickly announced that it would cover the costs of stranded travelers, covering more than 20.000 foreign nationals.. The country's National Emergency Crisis and Disasters Management Authority started negotiating the opening of emergency lines with airlines and GCC countries. Fines for tourists overstaying their visas were waived. Despite the impact, the UAE continues to see tourism as a fundamental part of its economy, expecting to receive 30.9 million tourists by 2030 and increase tourism's contribution to GDP to $24.5 billion dollars.

== See also ==
- Visa policy of the United Arab Emirates
- List of museums in the United Arab Emirates
