= Sheikh Zayed Palace Museum =

Museum in Al Ain, Abu Dhabi, United Arab Emireates

- مَتْحَف قَصْر ٱلشَّيْخ زَايِد
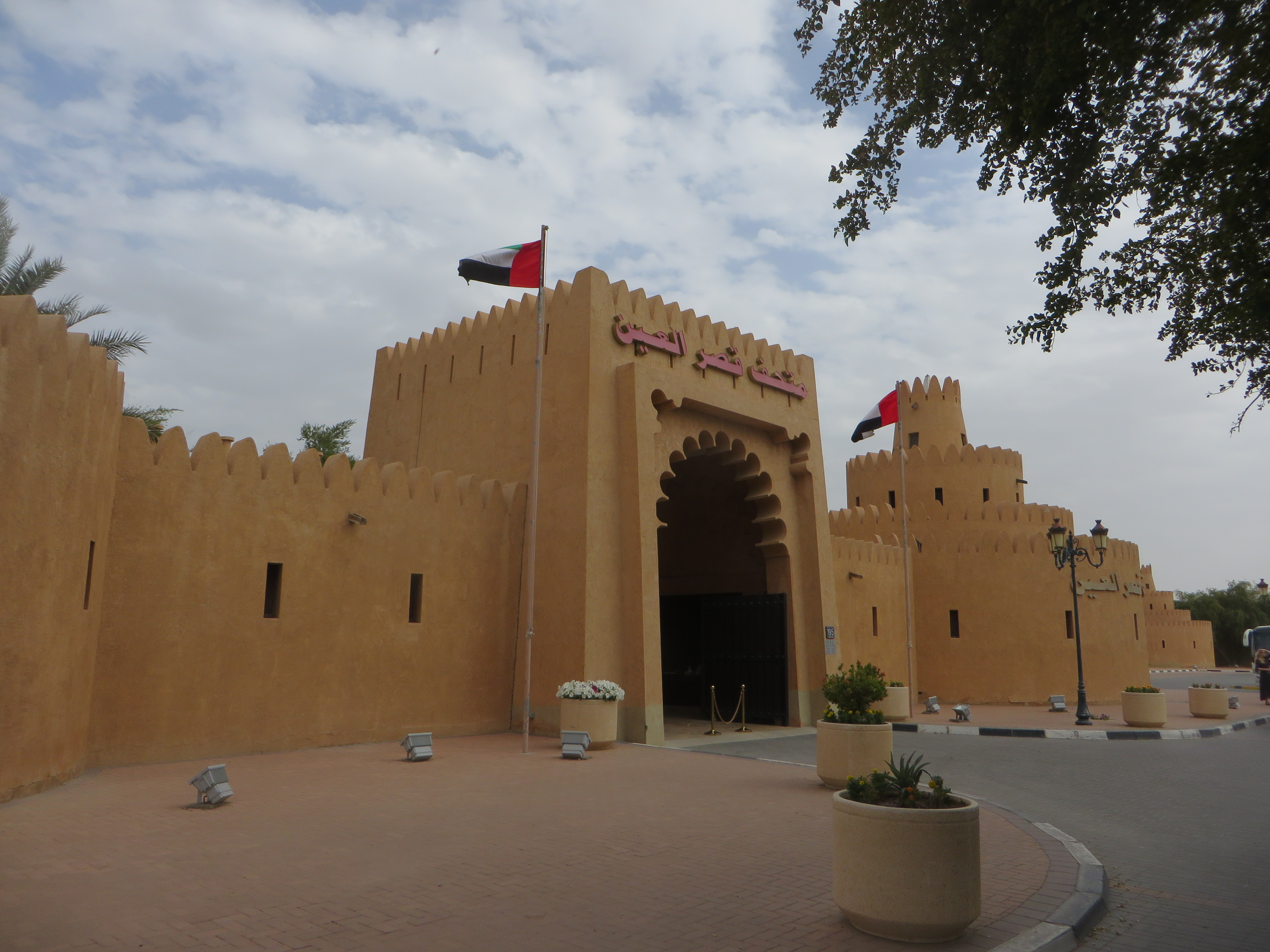
- Front entrance of the museum
- Location: Al Ain, Eastern Region of the Emirate of Abu Dhabi, the UAE
- Coordinates: 24°12′57″N 55°46′26″E
- Website: web.archive.org/web/20101129223513/http://www.adach.ae/en/portal/heritage/sheikh.zayedpalacemuseum.aspx

Sheikh Zayed Palace Museum (Arabic: مَتْحَف قَصْر ٱلشَّيْخ زَايِد, romanized: Matḥaf Qaṣr Ash-Shaykh Zāyid), also known as Al Ain Palace Museum (Arabic: مَتْحَف قَصْر ٱلْعَيْن, romanized: Matḥaf Qaṣr Al-ʿAyn), is a museum in the city of Al Ain, within the Emirate of Abu Dhabi, United Arab Emirates.

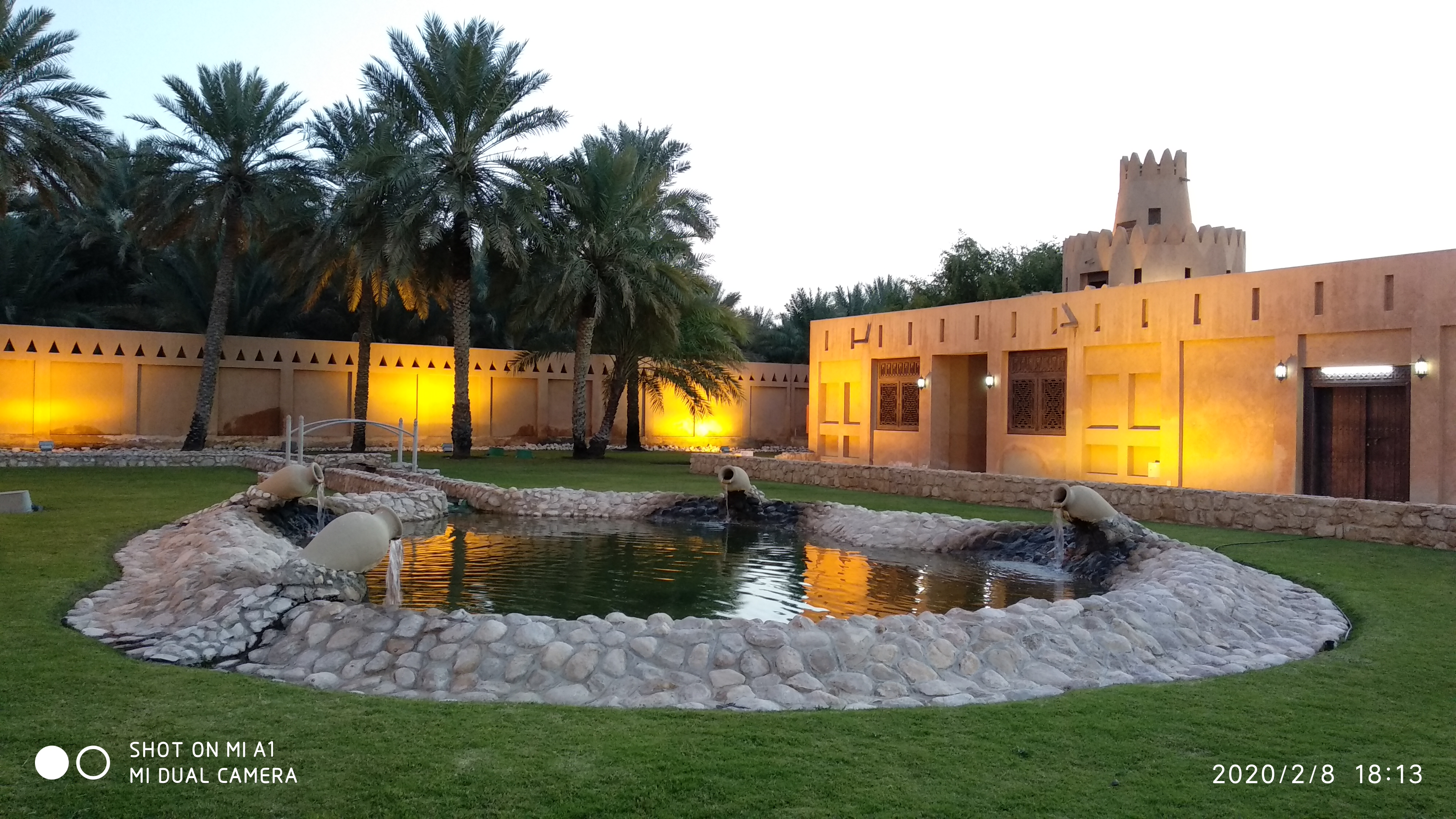

== Description ==
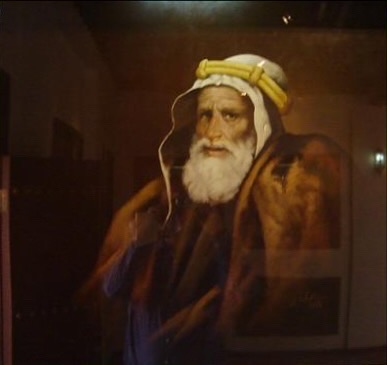
Portrait of Sheikh Zayed bin Khalifa (1840–1909) at the Sheikh Zayed Palace Museum

The museum is based in the palace of the former UAE President, Sheikh Zayed Bin Sultan Al Nahyan (1918–2004), and his family. It was originally built in 1937 on the western side of the Al Ain Oasis, the largest oasis in Al Ain. Sheikh Zayed lived here until 1966. It was made into a museum in 1998.

The museum presents many of the rooms in the palace, including an art gallery. Many of the rooms are of the majlis (meeting room for receiving visitors) type. In one of the courts there is a replica grand court tent, representing a link with Bedouin life. There is also a Land Rover similar to the one driven by Sheikh Zayed in the desert to visit Bedouin communities. Behind the museum is the Al Ain Oasis, with an entrance close by, and a path leading through the oasis to the Al Ain Museum.

== See also ==
- Al Jahili Fort
- Cultural policy in Abu Dhabi
- List of cultural property of national significance in the United Arab Emirates
- List of museums in the United Arab Emirates
- Tawam (region)
