= SMAS =

SMAS may refer to:

- Super Mario All-Stars, a video game
- Superficial muscular aponeurotic system, a group of facial muscles
- Superior mesenteric artery syndrome, a very rare illness that causes difficulty in digestion of food
- Spinal muscular atrophies (SMAs), a class of genetic muscular disorders

== See also ==
- SMA (disambiguation), for the singular
