= Sharjah Art Museum =

Art museum in the United Arab Emirates

Coordinates: 25.36143°N 55.38702°E

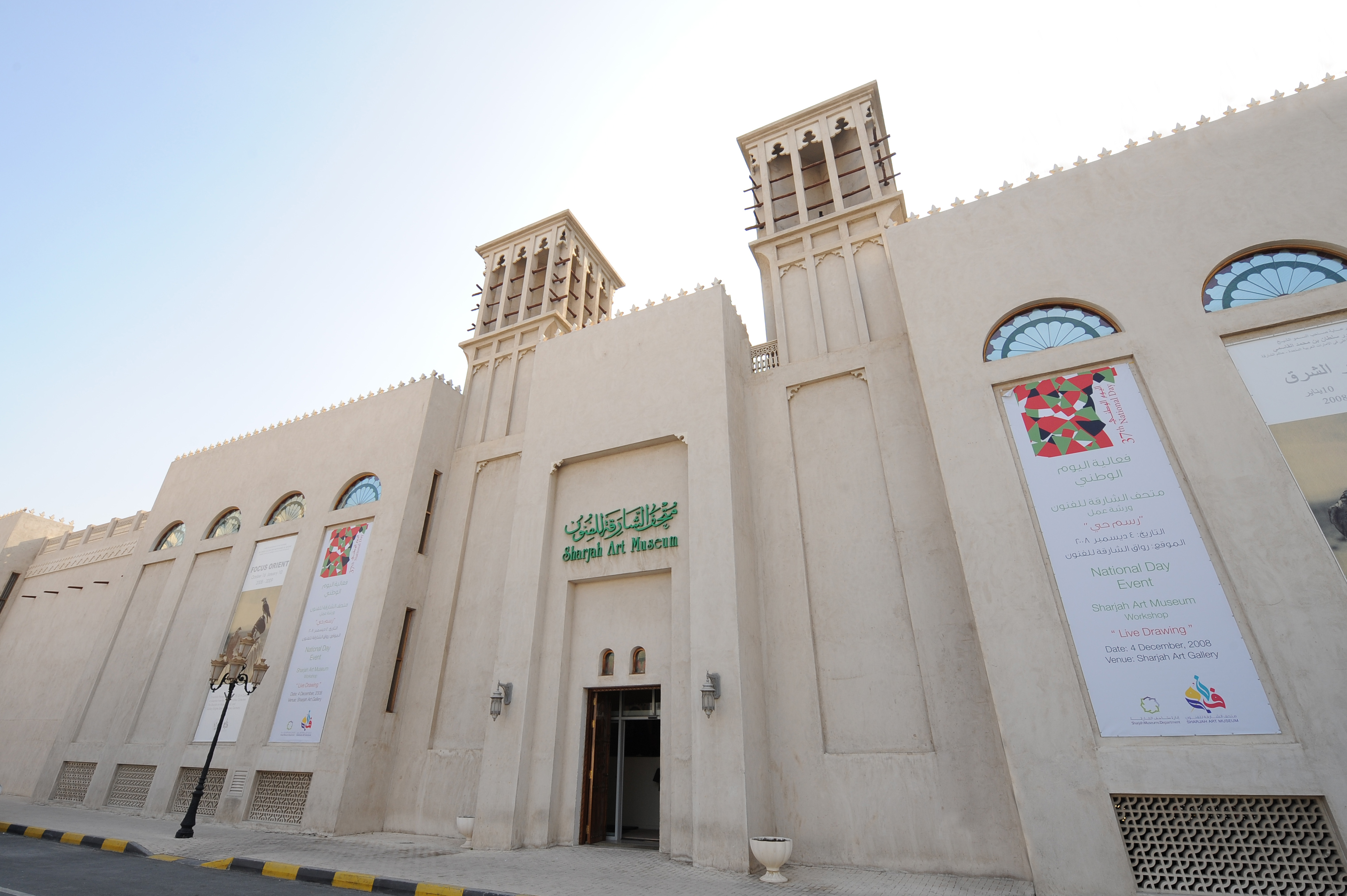
Sharjah Art Museum

The Sharjah Art Museum is an art museum in the city of Sharjah, United Arab Emirates. It was housed in Bait Al Serkal in Al Shuwaihean Area. It is one of the leading art institutions in the Persian Gulf region.

A new building of the museum was established on April 7, 1997, under the patronage of Sheikh Sultan bin Muhammad Al-Qasimi, the Supreme Council Member and Ruler of Sharjah during the 3rd Sharjah International Arts Biennial. Sharjah Art Museum has a collection of modern and contemporary art by artists from United Arab Emirates and other Middle Eastern countries. It also organizes and hosts temporary exhibitions and educational events. It has a total floor area of 111,000 m^{2} with galleries over two floors and an underground car park beneath it and has a permanent gallery with highlights from the renowned orientalist collection of His Highness Dr Sheikh Sultan bin Muhammad Al Qasimi, Supreme Council Member and Ruler of Sharjah.

== Exhibitions ==
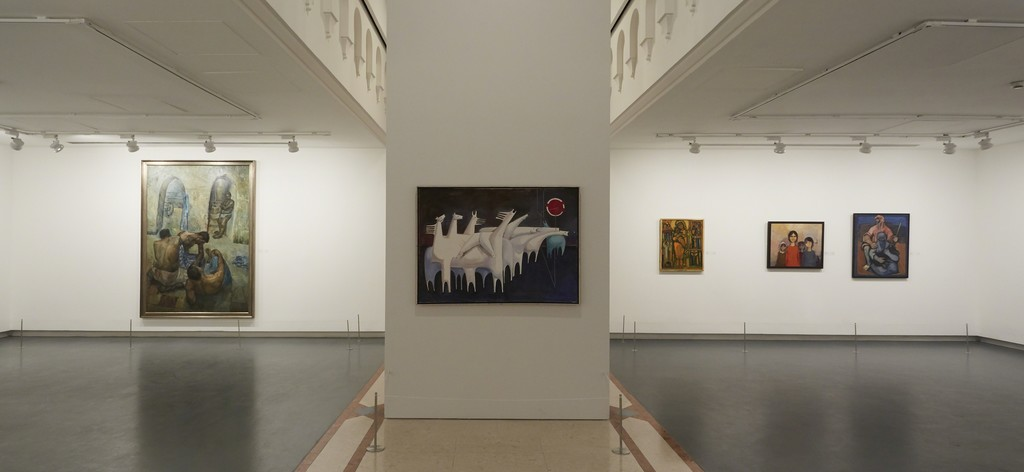
Barjeel Art Foundation exhibition at the Sharjah Art Museum

Sharjah Art Museum since its establishment, held numerous temporary exhibitions throughout the years. They were curated by the museum or in collaboration with other institutions. Some of those institutions were Cobra Museum of Modern Art in Amsterdam, TATE Britain in London, Barjeel Art Foundation in the UAE, and The Gibran Museum in Lebanon. It has been a pillar of the art scene in the country and region and has a dynamic expressions of Arab and international artists showcased through 300+ artworks across 64 halls.

=== Temporary Exhibition ===
- Stations by Lore Bert, 2007
- Andreas Gursky, 2007
- Face of Asia: Steve McCurry Photographs, 2008
- Lure of the East, 2009
- Tarek Al-Ghoussein, 2010
- Lithographs of David Roberts, 2011
- Ibrahim El-Salahi: A Visionary Modernist, 2012
- Trajectories: 19th and 21st Century Printmaking from India and Pakistan, 2014
- Cobra: 1000 Days of Free Art, 2015
- Drawings of Gibran: A Human Perspective, 2015
- Considering Dynamics and Forms of Chaos: Angela Bullock and Maria Zeres, 2016
- Kamal Youssef: Egyptian Surrealism's Time Capsule, 2016
- Ahmed Morsi: A Dialogic Imagination Exhibition, 2017
- Subversive Forms of Social Sculpture: Abdulnasser Gharem and Heimo Zobernig, 2018
- A Century in Flux: Highlights from the Barjeel Art Foundation, 2018-2023

=== Annual exhibitions ===
- Emirates Fine Arts Society Exhibition
- Lasting Impressions Exhibition organized by the museum to highlight pioneer Arab artists in the MENA Region some of them include:
  - Thuraya Albaqsami
  - Abdulqader Al Rais
  - Ismail Al Rifai
  - Abdul Latif Al Smoudi
  - George Bahgory
  - Najat Maky
  - Ismail Shammout and Tamam El Akhal
- Sharjah Biennial, organized by Sharjah Art Foundation
- Sharjah Islamic Art Festival

== See also ==
- Sharjah Museums Authority
- Sharjah Heritage Museum
- Sharjah Maritime Museum
- Sharjah Museum of Islamic Civilization
