= Al Ain Oasis =

Al-Ain Oasis وَاحَة ٱلْعَيْن
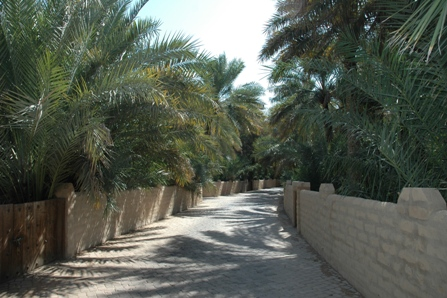
- An alley in the oasis

- Location of Al-Ain Oasis in the UAE Al-Ain Oasis (Persian Gulf) Al-Ain Oasis (West and Central Asia)
- Country: United Arab Emirates
- Emirate: Abu Dhabi
- Elevation: 292 m (958 ft)
- Time zone: UTC+4 (UAE Standard Time)

UNESCO World Heritage Site
- Official name: Cultural Sites of Al Ain (Hafit, Hili, Bidaa Bint Saud and Oases Areas)
- Criteria: Cultural: iii, iv, v
- Reference: 1343
- Inscription: 2011 (35th Session)

Al-Ain Oasis (Arabic: وَاحَة ٱلْعَيْن, romanized: Wāḥat Al-ʿAyn, "Oasis of the Spring") is the largest oasis in the city of Al Ain, within the Eastern Region of the Emirate of Abu Dhabi, the United Arab Emirates.

== Geography ==
It is located in Al-Mutawa'a District in central Al-Ain, and east of Al-Jahili District. The border between Al-Ain City and the Omani town of Al Buraimi is to the northwest. Al Ain Oasis is the city’s largest and, dating back more 4,000 years.The oasis covers more than 1,200 hectares and contains more than 147,000 date palm trees producing 100 varieties of date. Adjacent to the oasis are Al Ain National Museum and Sultan Bin Zayed Fort to the east, and Al Ain Palace Museum to the west. To south is Al Ain Sports Club and Jabal Al-Naqfah, a ridge of Jebel Hafeet. To the southwest are Al Ain Etisalat Building and the Oasis Hospital. Al Ain Oasis is also known as Al-Jahily Falaj. It was built by Zayed the Grand.

== Falaj ==
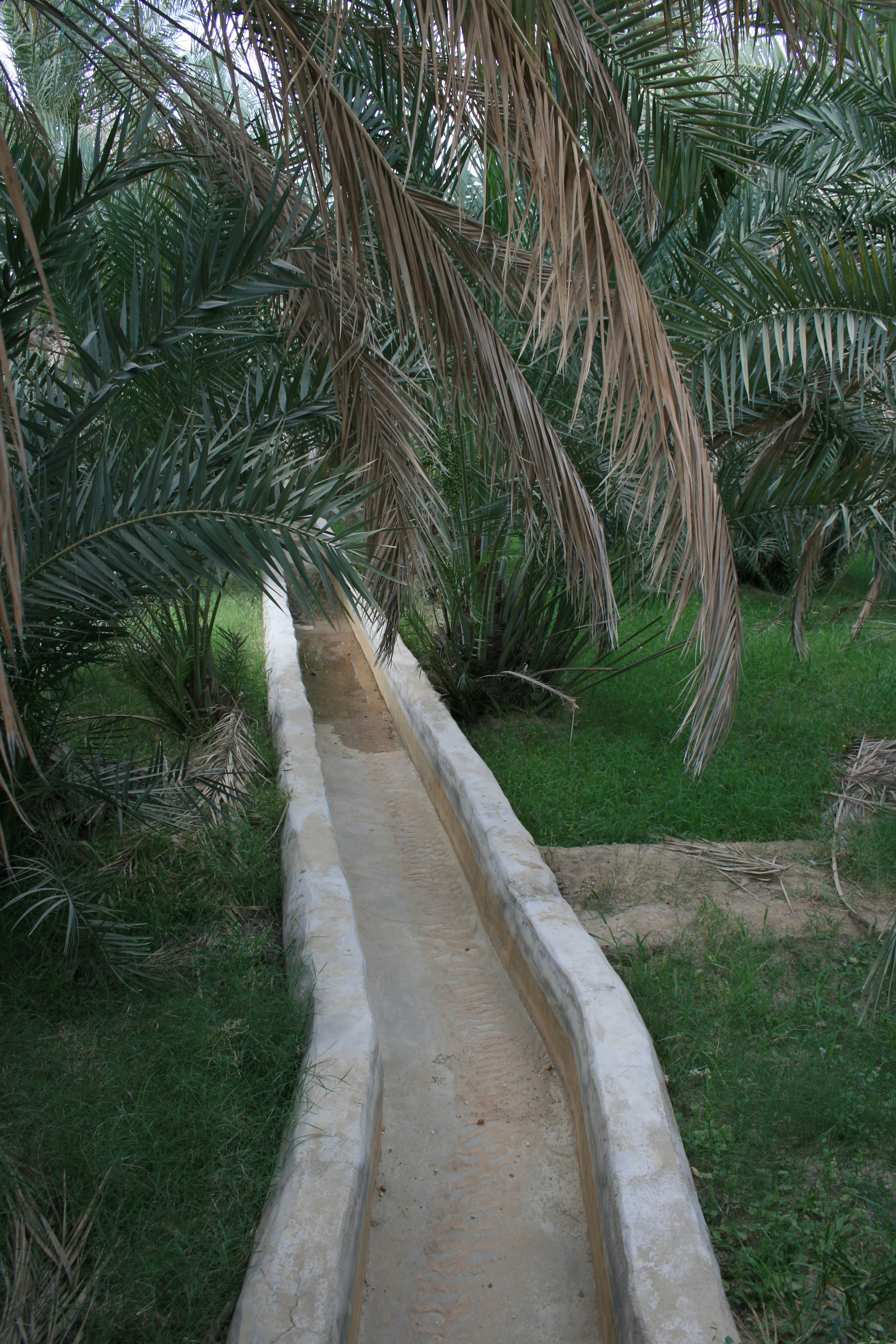
The falaj irrigation system at Al Ain Oasis

The oasis is known for its underground irrigation system (falaj or qanāt), which brings water from boreholes to water farms and palm trees. The falaj irrigation is an ancient system dating back thousands of years and is used widely in Oman, UAE, India, Iran, and other countries.

== See also ==
- Bidaa Bint Saud
- Hili Archaeological Park
- List of Ancient Settlements in the UAE
- List of cultural property of national significance in the United Arab Emirates
- List of tourist attractions in the United Arab Emirates
- Qattara Oasis
- Tawam (region)
