= SMA =

SMA or S.M.A. may refer to:

== Places ==
- American Samoa, ITU letter code
- Santa Maria Airport (Azores) (IATA code)
- San Miguel de Allende, Mexico

== People ==
- Sergeant Major of the Army, U.S.
- Sima (Chinese surname), or Sma
- Joshua Falk, known as SM"A

== Finance ==
- Separately managed account, types of investment account
- Special memorandum account, used regarding US Regulation T

== Organisations ==
- Scouts Musulmans Algériens, the Algerian Muslim Scouts
- Sharjah Museums Authority
- SMA Engines, a diesel aircraft engine manufacturer
- SMA Solar Technology
- Society of African Missions, a Catholic missionary organization
- Society of Makeup Artists, post-nominal letters

=== Education ===
- Saint Mary's Academy, Dominica
- Sekolah Menengah Atas, Indonesian for "senior secondary school"
- San Marcos Baptist Academy, Texas, US
- Sarasota Military Academy, Florida, US
- Science and Mathematics Academy, a program at Aberdeen High School, Maryland, US
- Former Staunton Military Academy, Charles Town, Virginia, US

== Science, engineering and technology ==
- Shape-memory alloy, that returns to its shape when heated
- Signal magnitude area, a statistical measure of magnitude
- Stone mastic asphalt, a type of road surface
- Styrene maleic anhydride, a synthetic polymer
- Submillimeter Array, radio telescopes in Mauna Kea, Hawaii, US

=== Computing and electronics ===
- SMA* (Simplified Memory-bounded Algorithm), a shortest path algorithm
- SMA connector (SubMiniature version A), a coaxial RF connector
- SMA 905 or F-SMA I, SMA 906 or F-SMA II, an optical fiber connector
- SMA or DO-214AC, a variant of the DO-214 diode package
- Surface-mount assembly, in electronics

=== Medicine and biology ===
- Standard methods agar or plate count agar
- SMA, several medical abbreviations
- SMA 12, SMA 20 and SMAC, previous names of Comprehensive metabolic panel blood tests
- α-SMA or ACTA2, an actin protein
- Spinal muscular atrophy, a severe neuromuscular disorder
- Spinal muscular atrophies, a heterogeneous group of rare disorders
- Superior mesenteric artery
- Supplementary motor area, of the primate brain

=== Mathematics ===
- Simple moving average, in statistics

== Music ==
- Seoul Music Awards
- "Sma", a 1999 song from the Point No. 1 album by band Chevelle

== Other uses ==
- Simulated milk adapted, an infant formula
  - SMA, Nestlé brand of baby milk
- Southern Sami language (ISO 639-2 language code)
