= Camel Museum =

Museum in Dubai, United Arab Emirates

Coordinates: 25.2683°N 55.2896°E

- Former name: Camel-Riding House
- Established: 1940
- Location: Dubai, United Arab Emirates
- Type: Historical Museum

The Camel Museum is a museum dedicated to species of camels and is located in Dubai, United Arab Emirates. The museum displays the important and traditional history of the Arab World and is one of Dubai’s most visited buildings. The different types of camels are exhibited in the Camel Museum in Dubai according to their ancestry and history. Visitors would be able to learn about camel history, races, anatomy, and much more. To get free access to the museum, it is important to have the Dubai City Pass.

== History ==
The Camel Museum was built in 1940 in the Al Shindagha neighborhood, and was formerly called the “Camel-Riding House” and “Beit Al Rekab”. The Camel-Riding House is known to be the property of the late Crown Prince, Sheikh Rashid bin Saeed Al Maktoum and it was built near his residence. The house was constructed to reflect both the Eastern and Western styles and has a single-story structure with a 4.7 m (15 ft) height, measuring 664 m^{2} (7,150 sq ft). Eventually, the house was expanded to include several new rooms and facilities that led to the building becoming a museum. This museum is made up of several wings and halls that contain information, prototypes, models, and tools about camels, including their history, facts, and merits. It also contains information about their races, anatomy, methods of treatment and care, as well as the benefits of their meat, milk, and wool.

== Significance ==
Before it became a museum, it was used as a place to keep camels and horses, as well as train them. Post becoming a museum, it became a place for visitors to learn about the significance of the camel’s heritage in the Arab world. It also explains the history of camel literature related to Arab culture and the importance of camels in the Arab and Muslim World. Visitors are required to take virtual tours of the museum and desert when visiting.
