= Al Ain Museum =

Museum in the UAE

- مَتْحَف ٱلْعَيْن
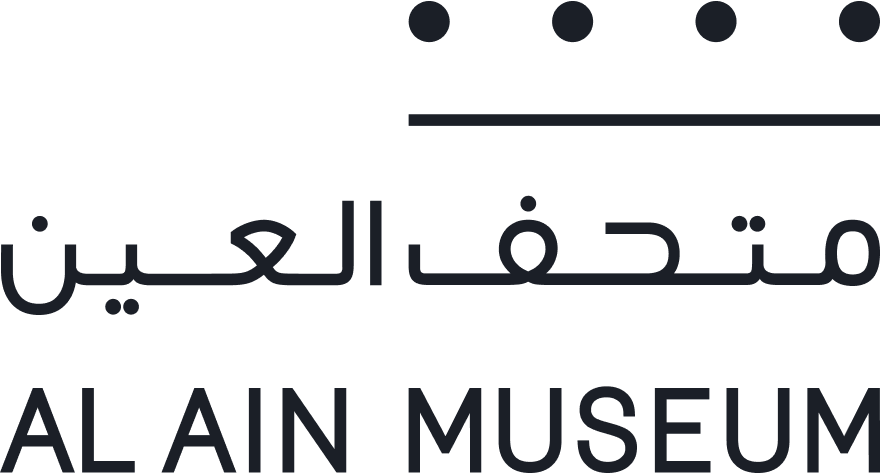

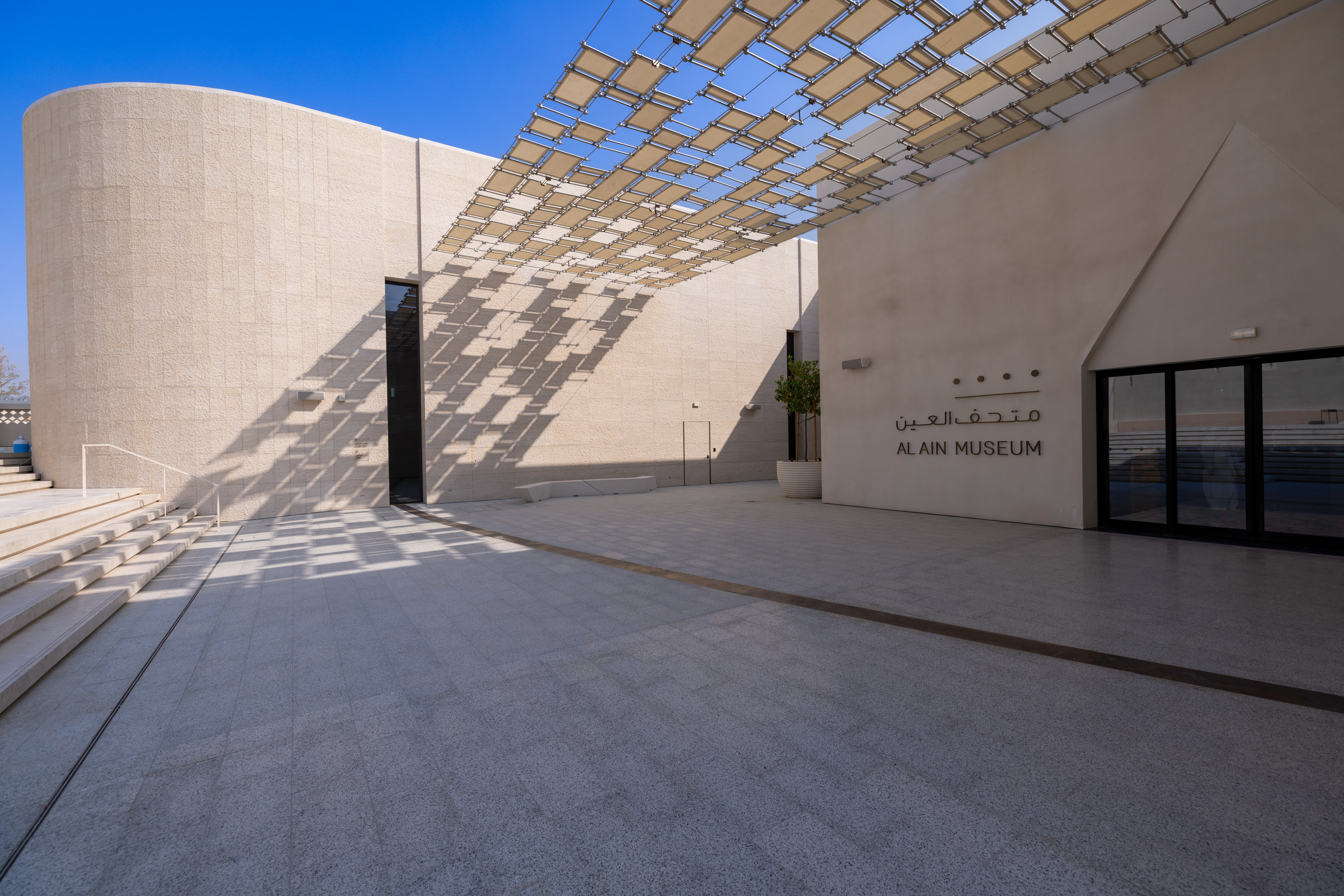
- Entrance to the main museum's building
- Established: November 2, 1971
- Location: Al Ain, Eastern Region of the Emirate of Abu Dhabi, the UAE
- Coordinates: 24°12′58″N 55°46′26″E
- Website: www.alainmuseum.ae/en

Al Ain Museum (Arabic: متحف العين) is a museum located in the city of Al Ain, in the Emirate of Abu Dhabi, United Arab Emirates. Established in 1969, it is the oldest museum in the UAE and focuses on the archaeology, history, and traditional culture of the Al Ain region. The museum is administered by the Department of Culture and Tourism – Abu Dhabi.

== History ==
Al Ain Museum was founded in 1969 under the direction of Sheikh Zayed bin Sultan Al Nahyan, the founding president of the United Arab Emirates. The museum was established to preserve archaeological discoveries from Al Ain and to document the cultural heritage of the region.

A temporary exhibition was initially housed in Sultan Fort, also known as the Eastern Fort, while purpose-built museum buildings were constructed. The museum was formally inaugurated in 1971. In 2018, the museum was closed for renovations where it has undergone several phases of development and conservation to improve exhibition standards and visitor facilities. In 2025, the museum was reopened to public.

== Location ==
The museum is situated near Al Ain Oasis, part of the UNESCO World Heritage–listed Cultural Sites of Al Ain. The museum complex includes the historic Sultan Fort, which dates back to the early 20th century and forms an integral part of the site.

== Collections and exhibitions ==
Al Ain Museum features nine permanent galleries that present the archaeological, environmental, and cultural history of the Al Ain region from prehistoric times through the modern era. In addition to the permanent galleries, the museum includes a temporary exhibition space and a visible storage area.

The permanent galleries are organised chronologically and thematically and include:

- Museum Introduction – an overview of the museum, its history, and the significance of Al Ain as a centre of human settlement.
- Paleolithic Period – focusing on early human activity in the region prior to 10,000 BCE.
- Neolithic to the Iron Age (c. 8000–300 BCE) – presenting the development of settled communities, agriculture, and metallurgy.
- Archaeological Tomb (c. 300 BCE–300 CE) – highlighting burial practices and funerary architecture.
- Aflaj and Wells Hall (c. 1000 BCE–300 CE) – exploring early water management systems and oasis life.
- Aflaj and Wells (c. 1000 BCE–1950 CE) – examining the long-term evolution of falaj irrigation systems.
- Late Pre-Islamic to Late Islamic (c. 300 BCE–1960 CE) – tracing cultural and religious developments in the region.
- Late Islamic Period (c. 1950–1960 CE) – focusing on social and economic life in the mid-20th century.
- Visible Storage – displaying stored archaeological objects and illustrating museum conservation practices.

The museum also hosts a temporary exhibition gallery, which presents rotating exhibitions related to archaeology, heritage, and culture.

== See also ==
- Al Ain Palace Museum
- Cultural policy in Abu Dhabi
- List of cultural property of national significance in the United Arab Emirates
- List of museums in the United Arab Emirates
- Al Ain Zoo
- Jebel Hafeet
