= Dubai Coins Museum =

Museum in Dubai

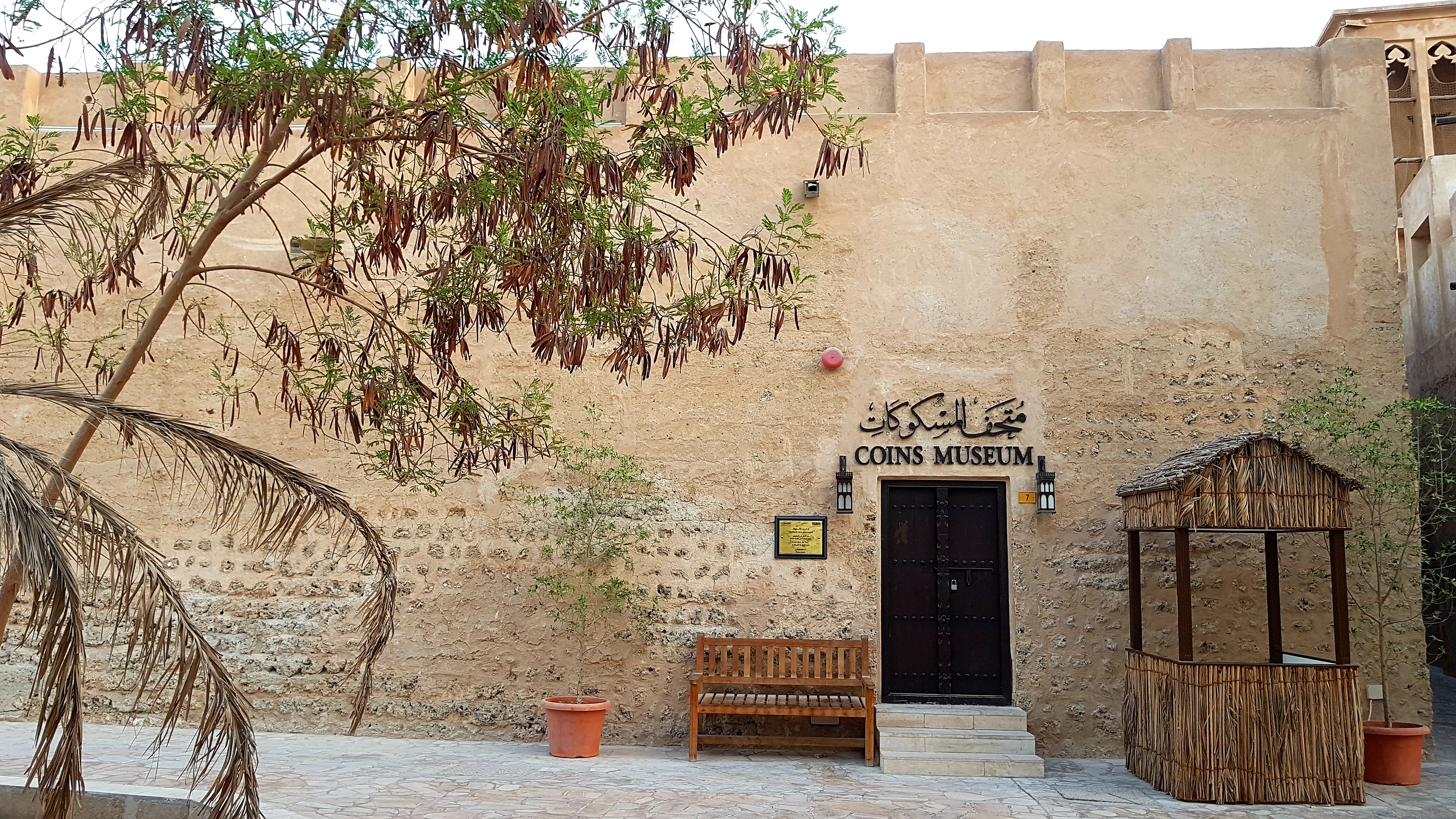

- Location within United Arab Emirates
- Coordinates: 25.264554°N 55.29983°E

The Coins Museum in Dubai, also known as "The Coins Museum in Bur Dubai," is located in the Emirate of Dubai in the United Arab Emirates in Al-Bastakia, Bur Dubai. It is a museum that entirely specializes in coins, and it aims to expand the knowledge of coins that were used in the region in the past, in addition to acknowledge the close link between the monetary system of the British Empire, India, and other countries in the region before gaining independence and forming a union.

== Overview ==
The Coins Museum is a highly specialized museum that aims to attract people who are especially interested in rare and historic coins. It is located near Al-Diwan Mosque in Al-Fahidi Historic Neighborhood. It was established in 2004, and it is in a traditional Arabic building made out of coral, stone, plaster, sandalwood, leaves and trunks of palm trees. The museum's structure gives an overview of the past, showing the way the early residents of the UAE lived in one of the liveliest neighborhoods in the city.

== The Museum's Rooms ==
The museum is composed of eight rooms, with each room covering a different subject. The first room is dedicated to directing the museum. The second room is dedicated to displaying historical information on money. The third room is composed of a collection of the Arabized Sasanian Dirham that were minted during the Umayyad Rashidun Caliphate. The fourth room includes a collection of dinars and dirhams, dating back to the Umayyad Caliphate, starting from the reign of Caliph Abd al-Malik bin Marwan until the fall of the Caliphate in 132 Hijri. The fifth room includes a collection of artifacts dating back to the Abbasid Caliphate, starting from the reign of the Caliph Abu Al-Abbas Al-Saffah, founder of the Abbasid Caliphate, and ended with the fall of the Caliphate during the reign of the last Caliph, Al-Mu'tasim Billah. The sixth room is dedicated to collections that were minted in Egypt, The Levant, and Turkey, and it also includes a collection of coins from Iraq and the Islamic East. Additionally, it includes money that belong to the states of the Buyids, Samanids, Seljuks, and Saffarids. The seventh room includes a collection of coins that belong to North Africa and Andalusia, including coins from the Umayyad State, Aghlabids, and Zirids. The eighth and final room includes a collection of artifacts that originate from the Arabian Peninsula and the United Arab Emirates, including the states of Al-Rassi, Al-Ziyadi, Al-Salhi, Al-Zar’i, and Al-Rasouli. It also includes other coins that are contemporarily used in the region.

== The Museum's Content ==
The Coins Museum in Dubai includes a number of coins that date back to ancient Arabic period. Visitors can look at 470 different coins, all of which are displayed in the Museum's rooms in the special display cases. The magnifying glass allows visitors to see the coins closely on the touchscreens next to the showcases alongside thorough information surrounding all the displayed coins.

=== Dividing The Coins ===
- 16 Coins from the Sasanian Arab dirham of the Rashidun and Umayyad caliphs
- 64 Coins from the Umayyad Caliphate dirhams and dinars
- 115 Coins from the Abbasid Caliphate dinars and dirhams
- 45 Coins that were minted in Egypt, The Levant, and Turkey from the reigns of the Tulunids, the Ikhshidids, the Fatimids, the Mamluks, and the Ottoman disputes
- 91 Coins minted in Iraq and the Eastern Islamic region
- 22 Coins minted in North Africa and Andalusia
- 102 Coins from the Arabian Peninsula and the United Arab Emirates

== Additional Information ==
=== Working Hours ===
The Dubai Coins Museum is open from Monday through Thursday from 8:00 AM until 3:00 PM, and on Friday from 8:00 AM until 11:30 AM, and it is closed during the weekend.

=== Cost ===
Entering The Coins Museum in Dubai is free.
