= Signal magnitude area =

In mathematics, the signal magnitude area (abbreviated SMA or sma) is a statistical measure of the magnitude of a varying quantity.

== Definition ==
The SMA value of a set of values (or a continuous-time waveform) is the normalized integral of the original values.

In the case of a set of n values $\{x_1,x_2,\dots,x_n\}$ matching a time length T, the SMA

$$x_\text{sma} = \sum_{i=1}^n x_i$$

In the continuous domain, we have for example, with a 3-axis signal with an offset correction a for each axis, the following equation:

$$f_\text{sma}= {1 \over T} \int_0^T |x(t)-a_x|+|y(t)-a_y|+|z(t)-a_z| \, dt$$

== See also ==
- Root mean square
