= Sharjah Science Museum =

- متحف الشارقة العلمي
- Established: 17 April 1996
- Location: Sharjah, United Arab Emirates
- Coordinates: 25.34965°N 55.42465°E
- Website: sharjahmuseums.ae

Sharjah Science Museum (متحف الشارقة العلمي) is a science museum in Sharjah, United Arab Emirates.

The museum opened on 17 April 1996. It includes over 50 interactive exhibits, and another section is the educational center, which organizes workshops and provides visitors with opportunities to learn about various fields of science and technology. The museum is overseen by the Sharjah Museums Authority.
