= The House of Sheikh Saeed bin Hamad Al Qasimi =

Coordinates: 25°4′50.5″N 56°21′32.9″E

- Interactive map of the The House of Sheikh Saeed bin Hamad Al Qasimi area

General information
- Location: Kalba
- Opened: 1901
- Owner: Sharjah Museums Authority

The house of Sheikh Saeed bin Hamad Al Qasimi, built by the ruler of Kalba Saeed bin Hamad Al Qasimi, served as the administrative center for the Emirate of Kalba and its subordinate areas from 1903 until 1937.

It was built between 1898 and 1901 directly across from the historical fort.

== Museum history ==
The house was restored in two stages that started in 1993. On December 5, 1999, the house was officially opened to the public. as a museum. The house had seventeen rooms, three chambers, a yard, and a visitors' reception room, in which Al Qasimi concluded numerous significant treaties and agreements with the British during their occupation of the region.

In the inner yard there are two suites, each containing several rooms, a chamber, a kitchen, a nursery, and a bedroom for Sheikh Saeed connected with a small storage for his items and personal belongings. There is also a room for his personal weapons.

The Islamic Heritage Rooms showcase Islamic holdings, including a copy of the Qur'an written in 256 AH (c. 870 CE) in Kashmiri script.

Other rooms have historical coins and archaeological artifacts, including stone bowls made of steatite that date to the second millennium BCE.

== See also ==
- Kalba
- Sheikh Sultan bin Mohammed AlQasimi
