= Sharjah Archaeology Museum =

Archaeological museum in the UAE

Coordinates: 25.3482°N 55.4238°E

The Sharjah Archaeology Museum is an archaeological museum in the Halwan district of Sharjah, United Arab Emirates. It opened on 5 January 1993 and moved to its current building in May 1997. The museum displays archaeological finds recovered from sites across the emirate, with galleries covering periods from the Stone Age to the beginning of the Islamic era.

== History ==
Archaeological excavations in Sharjah began in 1973. In 1992, Sultan bin Muhammad Al-Qasimi issued legislation to protect archaeological sites and discoveries in the emirate and to combat the illegal trade and smuggling of artifacts. The museum opened on 5 January 1993 and relocated to its current building in Halwan in May 1997 as the number of archaeological discoveries increased.

In 2006, the Sharjah Museums Authority assumed responsibility for operating the museum, alongside 16 other museums across the emirate.

== Collection and galleries ==
The museum houses hundreds of artifacts excavated from sites across Sharjah, with displays addressing human occupation in the emirate as far back as 125,000 years ago. Its main galleries follow a chronological route from the Stone Age to the advent of Islam and display pottery, stone and metal tools, weapons, jewelry and coins. A separate gallery is devoted to the Neolithic cemetery at Buhais 18, where the remains of approximately 500 individuals were recovered.

=== The Archaeology Hall ===
This hall includes an enlarged aerial photograph of the northern Emirates in the shape of a map, showcasing Sharjah's location overlooking the Arabian Gulf from the west and the Arabian Sea from the East, making it an intermediary between the other emirates, Abu Dhabi, Dubai, Ajman, Ras Al-Khaimah, Fujairah, and Umm Al-Quwain. Sharjah varies in terrain, from its coastal plains soaked in sea water to its sandy deserts in the center, and its medium-height mountains in the East. Its mountains are its most generous region in groundwater and heavy rains. In the past, that was what made it habitable, in addition to the facilitation of cultivation of its gravel plains, and that's how Sharjah's terrains planned out the life of past Sharjah residents, making them hunters, farmers, shepherds, moving from the mountains to deserts in accordance with the weather conditions. Additionally, they also often resorted to fishing and shell-collecting on the western and eastern coasts. Later on, they were able to plant fertile grounds, which contributed to the settlement of a number of people. The open coasts enabled the first inhabitants to communicate and trade with other countries and civilizations, and discovering pottery shards, near Al-Himriya Beach, in northern Sharjah, belonging to utensils from the flourishing Ubaid Period in Southern Iraq, dating back to seven-thousand years ago. These links were deepened, by sea and land as the first Sharjah residents reached to Yemen, Bahrain, The Levant, Persian Coasts, The Sindh, and as far as Greece. The map showcases the most significant archaeological places in Sharjah, such as Muweileh, Al-Himriya, Tell Abraq, on the western coast, and Jebel Buhais, Maleha, Al-Faya Mountain, in the center, and Kalba, Dibba Al-Hisn, and Khorfakkan, on the eastern coast, all dating back to different periods, the oldest of which is 85 thousands years old. On the side facing the hall is a model of an archaeological site, where children aged between seven and fourteen can reincarnate the roles of archaeologists and mine the sand using mining tools, trying to find lost archaeological artifacts under the supervision of specialized educationalists guides who help them lift, photograph, and number what they've found before assigning an ID card to it, draw its dimensions, and describe it thoroughly, allowing them to appreciate the efforts of archaeologists. The museum has four main halls, including:

==== 1- The Stone Age Hall (5000 B.C. - 3000 B.C.) ====
In this hall, visitors are introduced to life in Sharjah during the Stone Age. They are given an overview of how the residents fluctuated between hunting and fishing, and shepherding and farming. The hall's display cabinets showcase a rare collection of archaeological findings from Sharjah, and it includes flint tools and personal exquisite ornaments, made out of bone, stones, and even pearls. Moreover, the hall displays the most ancient pearl necklace found in the UAE, and it was discovered in Jebel Buhais, and it is over seven-thousand years old. The hall also exhibits colored pottery shards belonging to the Ubaid Civilization, which flourished in Southern Iraq during that period, proving ancient links between Sharjah and other civilizations since thousands of years ago.

==== 2- The Bronze Age Hall (3000 B.C. - 1300 B.C.) ====
Despite Sharjah's weather becoming drier during this period, a new improvement was made when stone was replaced with metal for making tools needed for daily life. Copper was abundant in the mountains of the region, enabling residents to mine and manufacture it. Tin was added to copper, creating the new mix known as Bronze. During this age, creating pottery was popularized and the links between Sharjah and other civilizations were deepened, including the Tell Abraq settlement on the Arabian Gulf coast. Also, findings proved that the residents were communicating with The Sindh, Mesopotamia, and Delmon civilizations as many pottery utensils, seals, and unique ivory combs buried in those sites and imported from different parts from the world. Similar to their ancestors in the Stone Age, the residents of Sharjah during the Bronze Age continued to shepherd and hunt. They also planted their grounds with wheat and barley for the first time, which made them improve and modernize their irrigation methods to keep up with their increasingly dry weather. They also started building mud houses and using palm fronds for the rooftops; thus, palm trees became an important resource for dates, building-materials, and making ropes and baskets.

==== 3- The Iron Age Hall (1300 B.C. - 300 B.C.) ====
Despite the relatively small numbers of iron findings in the region during this period, it was still named “The Iron Age.” The iron's lack of use could be attributed to its lack of raw materials locally in comparison to the abundance of copper. However, two main variables led to drastic economic and social changes. Firstly, digging irrigation channels to reach farms and population communities, and these channels were commonly known as “Al-Falaj.” This noticeably flourished farming and expanded reaping wheat and barley, and planting palm trees, which led to the formation of a number of small agricultural villages. Secondly, the domestication of camels which appears to have happened towards the end of 2000 B.C. south of the Arabian Peninsula, after which raising camels spread across its regions, including the area which is the UAE today. This period marks the beginning of the friendship between the Arab and his camel, as well as the beginning of making trade routes which are to connect the different parts of the Arabian Peninsula, as well as connect it to its external ocean in the north. This paved the way for a period of trade boom springing from Yemen through incense caravans and gum. This period is when Muweileh becomes the star of the country, for this village with adjacent houses made out of adobe, located 15 km away from Sharjah's coast on the Arabian Gulf, weaved a network with Yemen, Iran, and Mespotamia, whose nature is not known until now, although proof that it happened was found in its soil, including the first trace of writing found in the United Arab Emirates until now, which was written in the Sabaean Musnad script that originated in Yemen.

==== 4- The Arabian Peninsula Grand Hall (300 B.C. - 611 A.D.) ====
In the beginning of the third-century B.C., The Arabian Peninsula reinforced its role as a mediator in the trade network between the Indian Ocean countries and the Mediterranean Sea countries. Allowing Arabs control the backbone of the trade between these countries, which is incense. Yemenites used to import incense from Asia onto their ports before carrying it to the different kingdoms of Yemen, enabling them to make fortunes before exporting it again with its local product of gum, which was just as valuable as incense, to Mesopotamia, Egypt, Greece, and Rome.

Located 60 km east of the city of Sharjah, Maleha was the trade center in southeastern the Arabian Peninsula, for in it were discovered evidence of expansive connections between Maleha and Yemen, in addition to various other trade centers within and without the Arabian Peninsula. In fact, evidence reveals that there was communication between Maleha's residents and Greece and Egypt. It is possible that Maleha was a resting place for caravans before continuing their route across the Gulf's coasts to export its goods from South Asia and Yemen to Persia, etc. Evidence also shows that Maleha acted as a market for surrounding regions; in fact, it had authority and power in the region, allowing it to make its own currency, which was copied from the drachma of Alexander the Great. Maleha was greatly populated during the period of 300 B.C. and 300 A.D. Its residents buried the nobles in special graves before building funerary towers over them. They buried with them their most prized possessions, including pottery, imported glass and pottery utensils, and ornaments. Moreover, some even had their cattle, like horses and camels, buried with them, showcasing their faith in the afterlife, which they believed was a continuation of their first life.

===== The Sharjah ruler's collection =====
Many surface and buried findings were collected from Maleha and other areas in Sharjah throughout the years. Sometimes, these were found during construction work or plowing the fields. Some of these findings fell into the hands of archaeology lovers, and some were - unfortunately - taken out of the country, some made it back into Sharjah, whilst others didn't. Part of the pieces that made it back included art and ornaments from Maleha, and they were purchased by Sheikh Sultan Bin Muhammad Al-Qasimi, member of the Federal Supreme Council of the United Arab Emirates and Ruler of Sharjah, after he found out that they were being auctioned in Europe. He purchased them in order to preserve a valuable part of Sharjah's history, which would have been lost otherwise. His Highness then proceeded to give them to the Sharjah Archaeology Museum, and they are now being displayed in The Arabian Peninsula Grand Hall, for residents and visitors of Sharjah to enjoy and appreciate the efforts taken to preserve Sharjah's history.

==== Buhais 18 Hall ====
After completing the tour of the four main halls, visitors can go into the Buhais 18 hall, established by His Highness, the ruler of Sharjah, in March 2008. His establishing of the hall was filmed and posted on YouTube, in order to document ten years of accumulated efforts between collaborative expeditions between the local expedition and the German expedition from the University of Tübingen, which ended in 2005, following the discovery of the Buhais 18 Cemetery, which is one of the biggest cemeteries in southeastern the Arabian Peninsula and dates back to approximately seven-thousand years ago. The hall displays replica models for some of the discovered skeletons and a large number of archaeological finds, including beads used in making jewelry, bones of domestic animals that were raised and kept by residents at the time, and bones of wild animals that they hunted.

== Other activities ==
The Sharjah Archaeology museum's role is not just limited to welcoming visitors, it also extends to spreading knowledge about Sharjah's archaeological artifacts and its history. Thus, the museum has an annual schedule filled with events and educational and cultural activities, including:

=== Workshops ===
The museum's education department organizes a number of educational workshops throughout the year, targeting different people in society, including families, individuals, and students, in addition to tourists. For example, there is a monthly workshop for families, and there are workshops especially for school students, and schools are able to register their students for them. The department also organizes workshops for the elderly and people-of-determination. The topics of these workshops are related to the museum's exhibited pieces, and they aim to raise awareness of the importance of Sharjah's archaeological artifacts and the importance of preserving it through the activities incorporated in the workshops, which blend between entertainment and education.

=== Scientific lectures ===
Since autumn of 2010, the museum has been organizing a series of monthly lectures in light of its role in enlightening and spreading knowledge among museum employees and visitors. The final Wednesday of each month for these lectures on archaeology and history. These lectures are held in the museum's conference hall, and they are given by people who are specialized in the field, and invitations get sent out to all of the UAE's museums, in addition to anyone else from the general public who is interested in attending.

=== Scientific publications ===
The museum published a number of unique scientific publications ever since becoming a part of Sharjah Museums Authority in 2006, and they include:

==== 1- The Museum's Introductory Handbook ====
This handbook is dedicated to introducing the museum, its halls, and the time-periods it represents. It also offers an overview of the life of the average Sharjah resident, in addition to showing a collection of the pieces displayed in the museum. The handbook is in both languages, English and Arabic, and it was published in 2008.

==== 2- The Buhais 18 Site Introductory Handbook ====
This handbook was released in March 2008, in conjunction with the opening of the Buhais 18 Hall by His Highness, the ruler of Sharjah, as a way to introduce and explain it. It offers visitors a stereoscopic panel on the Buhais 18 Cemetery, and the most important conclusions of the expeditions. The handbook is in both languages, Arabic and English.

==== 3- The Sharjah Artifacts Handbook ====
A bilingual handbook (Arabic and English) giving descriptions of 60 selected pieces of Sharjah's artifacts, alongside photos of them, in four chapters, each chapter representing a different time period of Sharjah's pre-Islamic eras. The handbook was published in 2008.

==== 4- The Story of Hamdan and Aliya in The Archaeology Museum ====
This children's story gives children a narrative of Hamdan and Aliya's trip to the Sharjah Archaeology Museum, their encounters with the museum's tour guides, and their experience in the various halls with their family. The story aims to make children fond of archaeology and introduce them to Sharjah's artifacts, and how to preserve it. The book is in both languages, English and Arabic, and it is authored by the researcher in the museum, Khalid Hussein. The story is aimed at 7-12 year olds, and it was published in November 2009.

==== 5- The Arab Tour Guide's Handbook ====
This book is authored by the research department at the Sharjah Archaeology Museum, and it offers all the necessary information to help museum employees and employees in the tourism industry, generally, in the Arab World. This is in conjunction with the enlightenment curriculum applied by Sharjah as one of the Arab World's cultural capitals. The book is made up of six chapters where the author, Khaled Hussein Saleh Mansoor, talks about tourism and its importance in today's world. He also talks about the role of Arab tour guides in introducing the places and landmarks they work in, according to the scientific method used and applied by specialists in the field of tourism guidance internationally. The book targets Arab tour guides, both men and women, who work in all of the cultural, tourism, entertainment, and environmental facilities in the Arab World. It simplifies to them a new working method in the tourism guidance field, giving value and professionalism to this field, which is usually known to be improvisational and not organized, and giving a fair definition of Arab tourism. The book was published in Arabic in November 2011.

==== 6- Sharjah's artifacts tell its history ====
The title sums up the life-long efforts taken by miners since forty years ago, which were crowned by the formation of a local expedition in 1993 for it to take on directing expeditions in the emirate from then until now. The book also immortalizes twenty years of efforts by The Sharjah Archaeology Museum which became one of the most notable cultural institutions in the UAE in the field of archaeology since its opening in 1993. The author, Khaled Hussein Saleh Mansour, aims to introduce the reader to the different areas of the expeditions, and he takes the reader on a thrilling ride by offering descriptions of life in Sharjah since the first human appeared in it until the beginning of Islam in the seventh-century A.D., and he does this by interrogating the artifacts that were buried in Sharjah's soil, and that were found thanks to the miners' great efforts.

=== Summer camp ===
The museum started its summer camp programs in the summer of 2010 under the slogan (The Small World of Archaeology) as a way to educate kids and fill their free time during the summer holidays. It is directed and supervised by the museum's administration team. The idea evolved in the upcoming year, increasing the number of participants. In 2012, the camp's sub-slogan was (The Story of Writing), and the camp's program included entertaining topics, scientific competitions, and familiarization trips, greatly benefiting the children.

=== Seminars and scientific conferences ===
The museum suggested the idea of hosting a periodic seminar related to working in museums in the Arab World, and reinforcing and improving its role. The first seminar was titled (Our Museums Between Reality and The Ambition Towards A Prototypical Working Environment in Arab Museums). This one-of-a-kind seminar was hosted on the 19th and 20 December 2011. It aimed to look at the most recent experiments and the conclusions of the most beneficial applications on the local and international levels. It also looked at the relationship between museums and institutions, like universities and cultural and research institutions, and how to improve this relationship to improve the Arab museum's performance, generally. The seminar also hosted a number of specialists and researchers from within and without the Arab World in the field of museums. It also hosted university and leading cultural institutions' employees who presented valuable papers at the seminar.
