= Sharjah Calligraphy Museum =

Coordinates: 25°21′28″N 55°23′04″E

- Established: June 12, 2002
- Location: Sharjah, United Arab Emirates
- Type: Art museum
- Website: https://www.sharjahmuseums.ae

Sharjah Calligraphy Museum is a museum celebrating local and international artists and calligraphers, their distinctive masterpieces displayed all throughout in exhibits set to embrace the beauty of Arabic calligraphy. It aims to highlight the importance of preserving this art.

The museum showcases the evolution of Arabic calligraphy, with artworks of calligraphic texts, letters, and shapes on a variety of tools and surfaces, such as canvases, wood, paper, and even ceramics. Besides the permanent displays, the museum presents changing exhibitions, workshops, and conferences.

First opening its doors on June 12, 2002, Sharjah Calligraphy Museum is located in the Sharjah Heritage Area in the house of Hamad Al Midfaa.

== Temporary exhibitions ==
The museum acts as a venue for the Sharjah Calligraphy Biennial, arranged by the Sharjah Department of Culture and Information, every two years.

Some of the exhibitions organized by the department include the following:

1. The Enrique de Malacca Memorial Project by Ahmad Fuad Osman.
2. Video, audio, photographs, library, publications, and posters by Uriel Orlow.
3. Black-and-white video projection with sound by Apichatpong Weerasethakul and Chai Siri.
4. Various works by the late Ali Jabri, who was awarded a Shariah Biennial 2017 Special Prize.
5. A display of artwork and material by Antariksa.
6. “Mute Grain” by Phan Thảo Nguyên, which includes 24 paintings and a three-channel video.

== Opening hours ==
The museum is open from Saturday to Thursday, 8:00 AM till 8:00 PM. On Friday, the hours change to 4:00 PM till 8:00 PM.

== Facilities ==
Some of the available facilities include a library, a gift shop, restrooms, a visitor's sitting area, and Wi-Fi.

== Entry fees ==
Children under two years old are able to enter for free, while those between two and twelve years old would have to pay 5 AED. Children 13 and up and adults are required to pay 10 AED. For tourist groups, those under two are free, while children between two and twelve are required an amount of 3 AED each. People. 13 and up should pay 7 AED each.

School trips, government or private, are free.
