= Sharjah Museum of Islamic Civilization =

Islamic museum in Sharjah, United Arab Emirates

- متحف الشارقة للحضارة الإسلامية
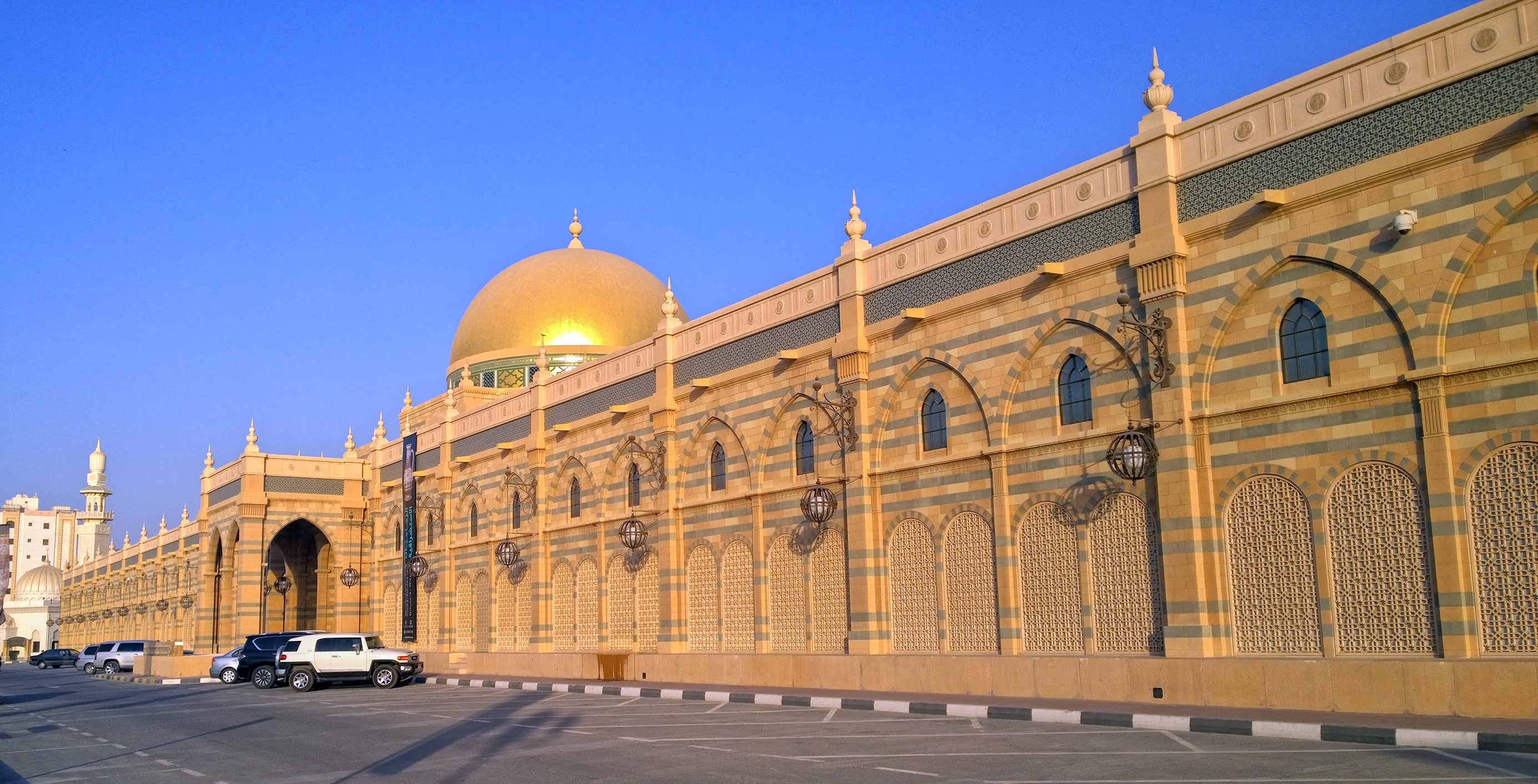
- Established: 2008
- Location: Sharjah, United Arab Emirates
- Type: museum
- Website: www.sharjahmuseums.ae

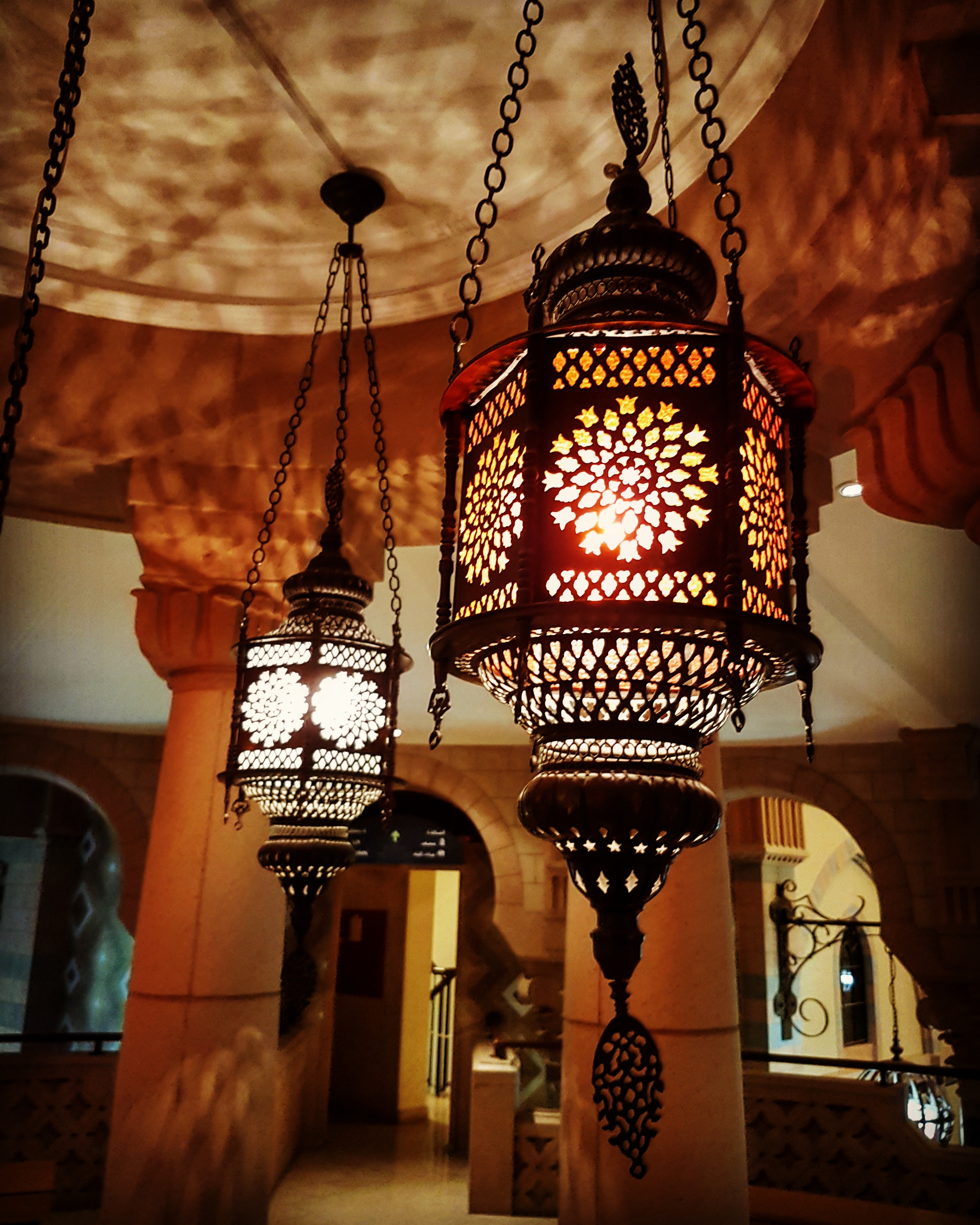
First floor gallery at Sharjah's Museum of Islamic Civilization

The Sharjah Museum of Islamic Civilization (Arabic: متحف الشارقة للحضارة الإسلامية) is a museum in Sharjah, United Arab Emirates (UAE). The museum, opened in 2008, covers Islamic culture, with more than 5,000 artifacts from the Islamic world. Objects include calligraphy, carvings, ceramics, coins, glass, manuscripts, metalwork, and scientific instruments. It was formerly known as the Islamic Museum and opened in 1996 before being moved and re-housed in the current building.

== Location ==
The museum is located on the Corniche Street in the Al Majarrah area, on the opposite side of the street from Sharjah Creek. It is openly visible because of its large size and characteristic golden dome. The museum is situated in the historical centre of Sharjah on the Majarrah Waterfront, in a building originally constructed as a souq (indoor market).

Sheikh Sultan bin Muhammad Al-Qasimi, a member of the Supreme Council of the UAE and ruler of Sharjah, inaugurated the museum on 5 June 2008. It celebrated its tenth birthday in November 2018, with an exhibition titled "Crossroads: Cultural Exchange between the Islamic Civilization, Europe and Beyond", mounted in co-operation with the Museum of Islamic Art, Berlin.

== Displays ==
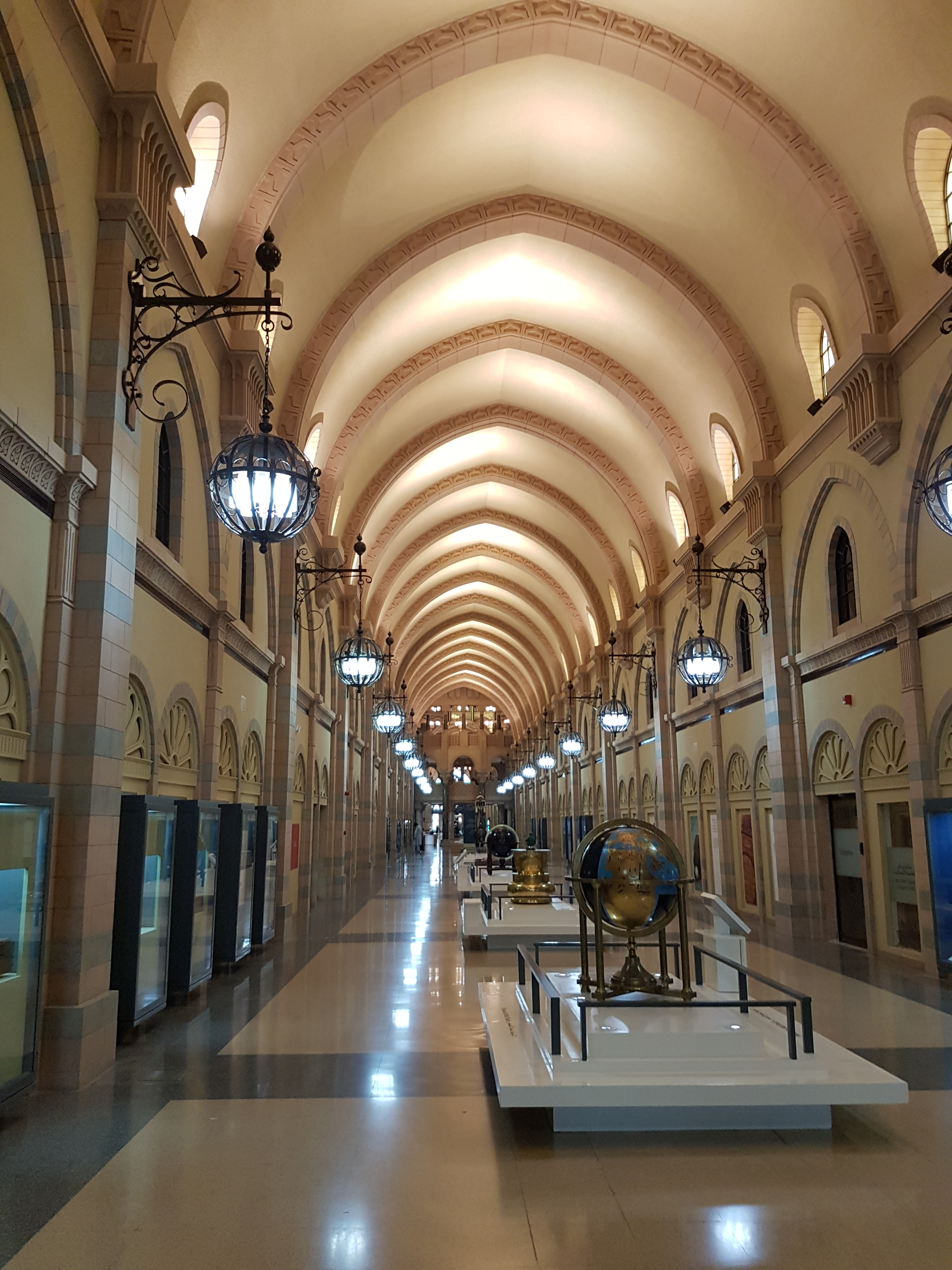
Interior of the Sharjah Museum of Islamic Civilization

The museum displays over five thousand Islamic artifacts which have been collected globally and displayed in seven thematic galleries, six of them dedicated to housing permanent exhibitions.

A gallery dedicated to the history and nature of Islam, the Abu Bakr Gallery of Islamic Faith, displays, among other objects, a copy of the Quran of the third Caliph, Uthman ibn Affan, who ruled from 644–656 AD. Alongside rare objects such as this and a Kiswa, the covering used for the Kaaba in Mecca, are early black and white images of Sharjah citizens embarking on the then arduous Haj pilgrimage.

A gallery devoted to the history of Islamic science, technology and innovation, the Ibn Al-Haytham Gallery of Science and Technology, includes displays showing Islamic scientific advancements, including complex early clocks, navigational aids and weapons. Four further galleries display Islamic art through the ages, as well as displays of modest fashion and contemporary pieces.

Displays along the central boulevard include cases of Islamic coins as well as clocks and other items.

A seventh gallery houses temporary exhibitions, with a regular roster of displays co-curated with other museums, ranging from Ottoman Masterpieces from the Museum of Applied Arts in Budapest to Persian calligraphy from the Islamic Arts Museum of Malaysia.

== See also ==
- List of Islamic art museums
- Sharjah Museums Department
