= Sharjah Heritage Museum =

Museum in Sharjah, United Arab Emirates

Coordinates: 25.3577°N 55.3847°E

- Type: Heritage museum
- Website: https://www.sharjahmuseums.ae

Sharjah Heritage Museum is a museum celebrating authentic Emirati culture and tradition, its six galleries featuring a broad variety of objects and displays. Originally established in 2005, the museum opened its doors once more in 2012 in the restored home of Saeed Al Taweel Al Shamsi, a pearl merchant or tawash.

It is located in the old town of Sharjah, a historical landmark actively being renovated in a heritage project named Heart of Sharjah. The galleries are categorized into six: landscape, lifestyle, celebrations, livelihood, traditional knowledge, and oral traditions.

== Galleries ==
=== Landscape ===
From coasts, islands, deserts, and oases, to mountains, wadis, and valleys, this gallery showcases Sharjah's natural surroundings. It illustrates the environment's effect on its people.

=== Lifestyle ===
An exploration of society, religion, and customs, this gallery includes visual examples of Emirati hospitality as well as rituals and entertainment. One image in the gallery shows two Emirati men rubbing their noses together. This is a traditional greeting.

=== Celebrations ===
Sharjah's heritage and traditions in the way they are practiced— Ramadan, Eid Al Fitr and Eid Al Adha, weddings, and Hajj— are put to light in this exhibition.

=== Livelihood ===
This gallery depicts the people's way of life, from trade and transportation to a woman’s role in her household. Pearl diving and date farming are two examples of their work.

=== Traditional knowledge ===
This exhibition explores the traditional knowledge that the people of Sharjah use to navigate life, from ways of tracking the desert and observing the sky, weather, and land to traditional healing methods.

=== Oral traditions ===
An interactive gallery that focuses on cultural and historical stories passed down orally through the generations, those of which include fairytales, legends, poems, proverbs, riddles, and music. On display are instruments used in music and dance as well as a belt called al manyour, made from 307 dried goat hooves, worn during the noban dance.

== Temporary exhibitions ==
This gallery highlights temporary exhibitions featuring arts and crafts inspired by heritage. Additionally, the "Dagger Craftsmanship in the UAE-A Craft of Authenticity and Creativity" exhibition has been open to the public since the 22nd of November 2022.

== Other collections ==
Some other displays include that of traditional clothing, jewelry, beauty products, traditional spices, local textiles, and a golden toe ring called aftakh worn by Bedouin women.
