= Sharjah Maritime Museum =

Archaeological museum in Sharjah, UAE

Coordinates: 25.3317636556°N 55.3590308198°E

General information
- Location: Sharjah, United Arab Emirates
- Opened: April 9, 2003

Sharjah Maritime Museum is an archaeological museum focusing on marine life that was an essential part of Sharjah's heritage and development. The visitor can see exhibits on pearl hunting, fishing, maritime trade and models of wooden dhows, including a pearl fishing boat, fishing equipment and diving tools.

== About the museum ==
The Sharjah Maritime Museum was opened for the first time in Al Mareijah on April 9, 2003. Then, the museum was moved to its new location in Al Khan, and reopened on June 7, 2009. The Sharjah Maritime Museum provides a full explanation of the residents of Sharjah and their maritime traditions. Through the museum's exhibits, the visitor can learn about the details of the marine life of the Emirate of Sharjah. The marine heritage that was collected and documented by the people of the Emirates, as part of the Sharjah Museums Department's endeavor to focus on marine life. or whom the sea was a major part of daily life for more than six thousand years, as the residents of Sharjah depended on the sea for food, water, and trade with other regions. It reviews ancient traditional fishing methods, marine songs, diving trips, commercial trips to the far seas and oceans, through traditional wooden ships that were used for fishing, trade, and pearl diving.

== Interior design ==
At the main door of the museum, a group of glass boxes containing a group of ancient antiquities were placed, including a pearl that is considered to be one of the oldest pearls in the world. It was discovered seven thousand years ago at the site of an ancient cemetery in Sharjah, and was used for decoration. From ancient shells and marine debris, scientists were able to identify the nature of the diet of the residents who lived on seafood.

== Fishing tools ==
Among the existing fishing gear is the “Neezah”, which is an iron piece with three pointed heads in the shape of a spear. It was used to catch crab and falcon fish. “Al-Mantab”, which is a thick stick with a large hook at the end, and is used to attract large fish stuck to the thread for fear of cutting it. There is also a lottery that is placed on the net of the gargoyle, and it is considered a sign to know the location of the gargoyle in the water. It is also displayed in the fishing tools section, “Al-Maksar”, that is, the fishing net, and “Al-Likh”, which is a fishing net made of cotton threads.“The Ring”, which is a large hook used for hunting sharks, is a weight of lead that is attached to the string to pull it to the bottom. There is also a “sallet”, which is a circular net with weights attached around its edge with a string to pull it. The sling floats on the surface of the water after throwing it, but the weights attached to the edge make it sink into the water. It catches all the fish stuck between the net and the bottom as it descends. Next to Al-Salia, there is the “gargoor”, which is an innovative trap in the form of a dome, used to catch fish without harming them.

Among the holdings displayed by the museum is a sharp stone head that is believed to have been used in hunting fish or wild animals. The antiquities corner also includes pieces that were discovered as a result of trade exchange in the region, including a vessel made in Dilmun in Bahrain, and an ivory comb made of elephant tusks, which is evidence of Establish commercial relations with the Indian civilization.

== See also ==
- Fujairah Museum
