= List of World Heritage Sites in the Arab States =

The United Nations Educational, Scientific and Cultural Organization (UNESCO) designates World Heritage Sites of outstanding universal value to cultural or natural heritage which have been nominated by signatories to the 1972 UNESCO World Heritage Convention. Cultural heritage consists of monuments (such as architectural works, monumental sculptures, or inscriptions), groups of buildings, and sites (including archaeological sites). Natural heritage consists of natural features (physical and biological formations), geological and physiographical formations (including habitats of threatened species of animals and plants), and natural sites which are important from the point of view of science, conservation, or natural beauty. UNESCO lists sites under ten criteria; each entry must meet at least one of the criteria. Criteria i through vi are cultural, and vii through x are natural. The implementation of the World Heritage Convention, the addition or removal of properties from the World Heritage List, and the allocation of funds, among other responsibilities, are managed by the World Heritage Committee. There are twenty-one state members on the committee. Although a term is a maximum of six years, most state parties choose to relinquish their responsibilities after four years so other countries can have the opportunity to be a member of the committee.

The Arab States are one of the five regions defined by UNESCO, alongside Africa, Asia and the Pacific, Europe and North America, and Latin America and the Caribbean. It consists of 19 Arab nations which have accepted the World Heritage Convention, making their historical sites eligible for inclusion on the list as World Heritage sites. The region has 102 properties on the World Heritage List. Of those properties, 91 were inscribed for their cultural significance, 8 for their natural significance, and 3 for both their natural and cultural significance–being termed mixed sites. There are as of October 2026, 25 World Heritage Sites in the Arab States which are endangered, and 1 has been delisted.

In addition to sites inscribed on the World Heritage List, member states can maintain a list of tentative sites that they may consider for nomination. Nominations for the World Heritage List are only accepted if the site was previously listed on the tentative list. The Arab States region has 254 properties on the tentative list.

Location of World Heritage Sites in the Arab States. Red dots represent cultural sites, green triangles represent natural sites, and blue squares represent mixed sites. The purple dots represent the cultural sites of Ancient Ksour. The black dots represent the Nubian Monuments. The yellow dots represent Sanganeb Marine National Park and Dungonab Bay – Mukkawar Island Marine National Park. The orange dots represent "Palestine: Land of Olives and Vines – Cultural Landscape of Southern Jerusalem, Battir". The turquoise dots represent the sites of the Ahwar of Southern Iraq. Gold dots indicate the sites of the Land of Frankincense, while pink are the sites of the Aflaj Irrigation Systems.

Arab States by World Heritage Sites and criteria, tentative listings, and World Heritage Committee service
State	Cultural	Natural	Mixed	Total	Tentative	Service on World Heritage Committee	Date joined	Ref
Algeria	6	0	1	7	12	3 times	24 June 1974	
Bahrain	3	0	0	3	6	2 times	28 May 1991	
Egypt	6	1	0	7	34	5 times	7 February 1974	
Iraq	5	0	1	6	15	2 times	5 March 1974	
Jordan	6	1	1	8	13	2 times	5 May 1975	
Kuwait	0	0	0	0	5	2 times	6 June 2002	
Lebanon	7	0	0	7	8	5 times	3 February 1983	
Libya	5	0	0	5	3	1 time	3 February 1983	
Mauritania	1	1	0	2	3	0 times	2 March 1981	
Morocco	9	0	0	9	14	2 times	28 October 1975	
Oman	5	0 (Note: Oman had one site, the Arabian Oryx Sanctuary, delisted because of oil extraction, area reduction, and the decrease of Oryx population.)	0	5	7	3 times	6 October 1981	
Palestine (incl. Jerusalem) (Note: East Jerusalem is not listed with a state party, although UNESCO recognizes that it is a part of Palestine, and puts it in the Arab States region.)	7	0	0	7	22	0 times	8 December 2011	
Qatar	1	0	0	1	2	2 times	12 September 1984	
Saudi Arabia	7	1	0	8	14	1 time	7 August 1978	
Sudan	2	1	0	3	15	1 time	6 June 1974	
Syria	6	0	0	6	12	1 time	13 August 1975	
Tunisia	9	1	0	10	16	4 times	10 March 1975	
United Arab Emirates	2	1	0	3	15	1 time	11 May 2001	
Yemen	4	1	0	5	35	1 time	7 October 1980	

== Algeria ==
=== World Heritage Sites ===
- Al Qal'a of Beni Hammad
- Tassili n'Ajjer
- Djémila
- Tipasa
- Timgad
- Kasbah of Algiers
- M'Zab Valley
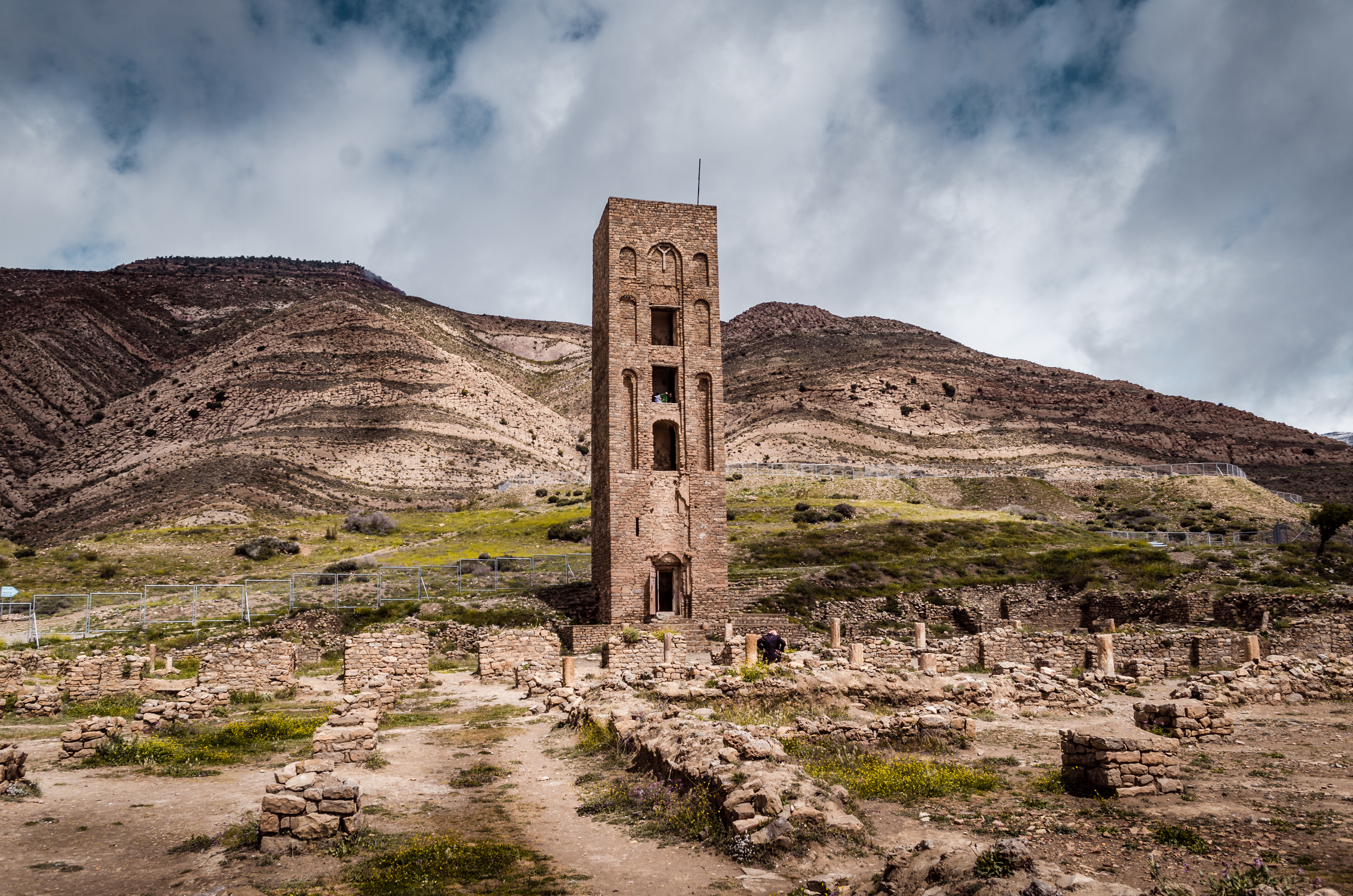
Qal'at Bani Hammad

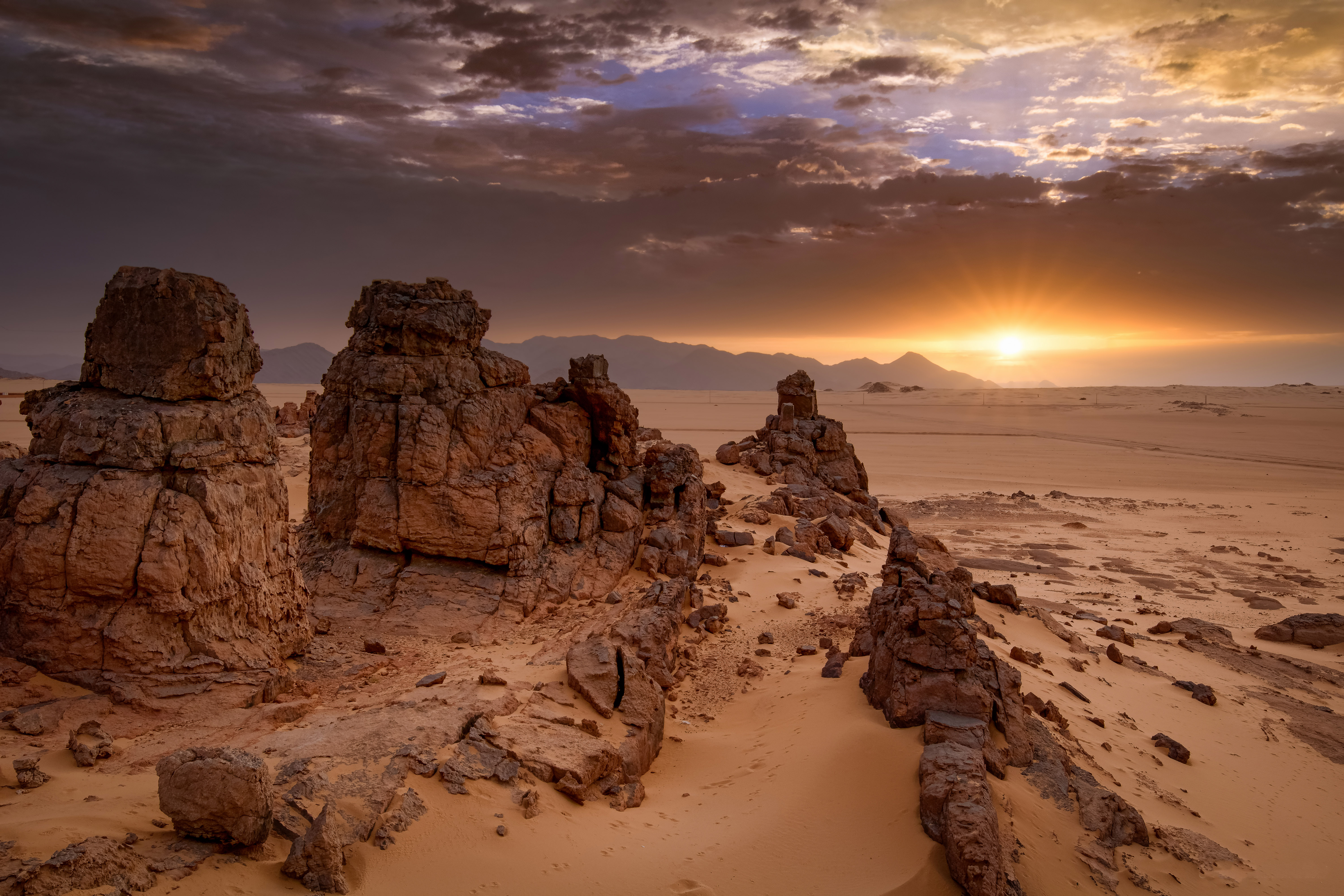
Tassili n'Ajjer

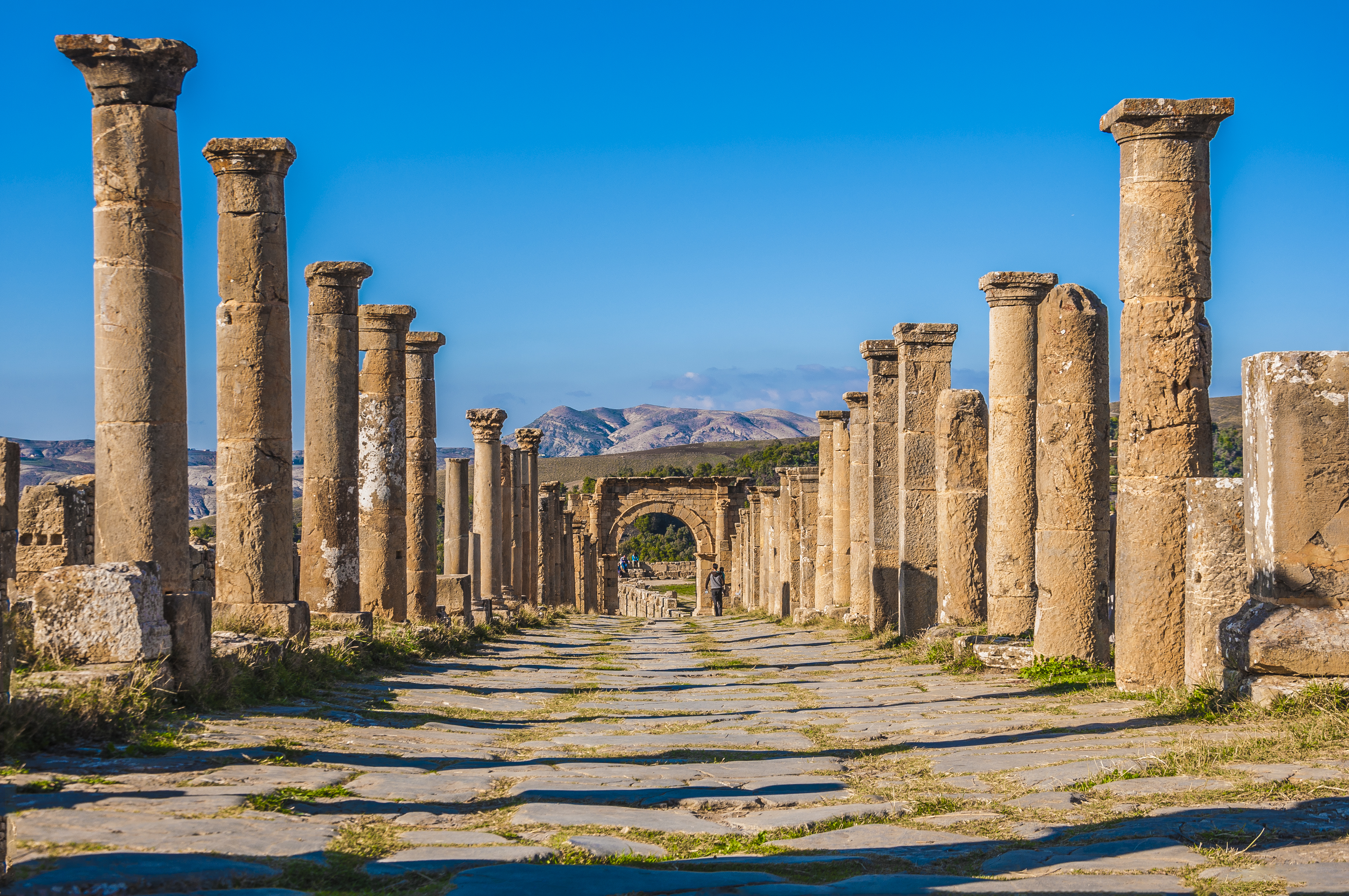
Djémila

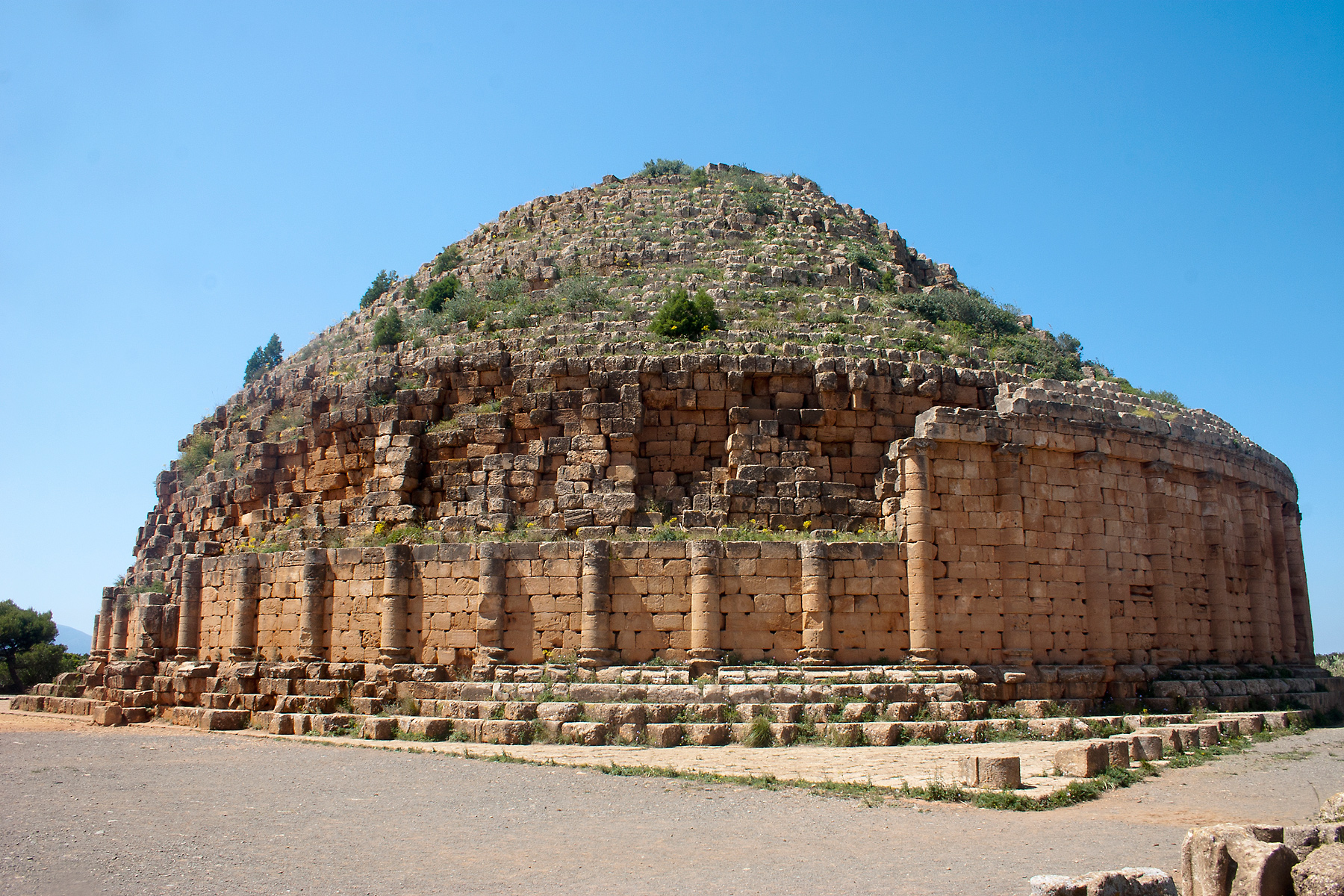
Tipasa

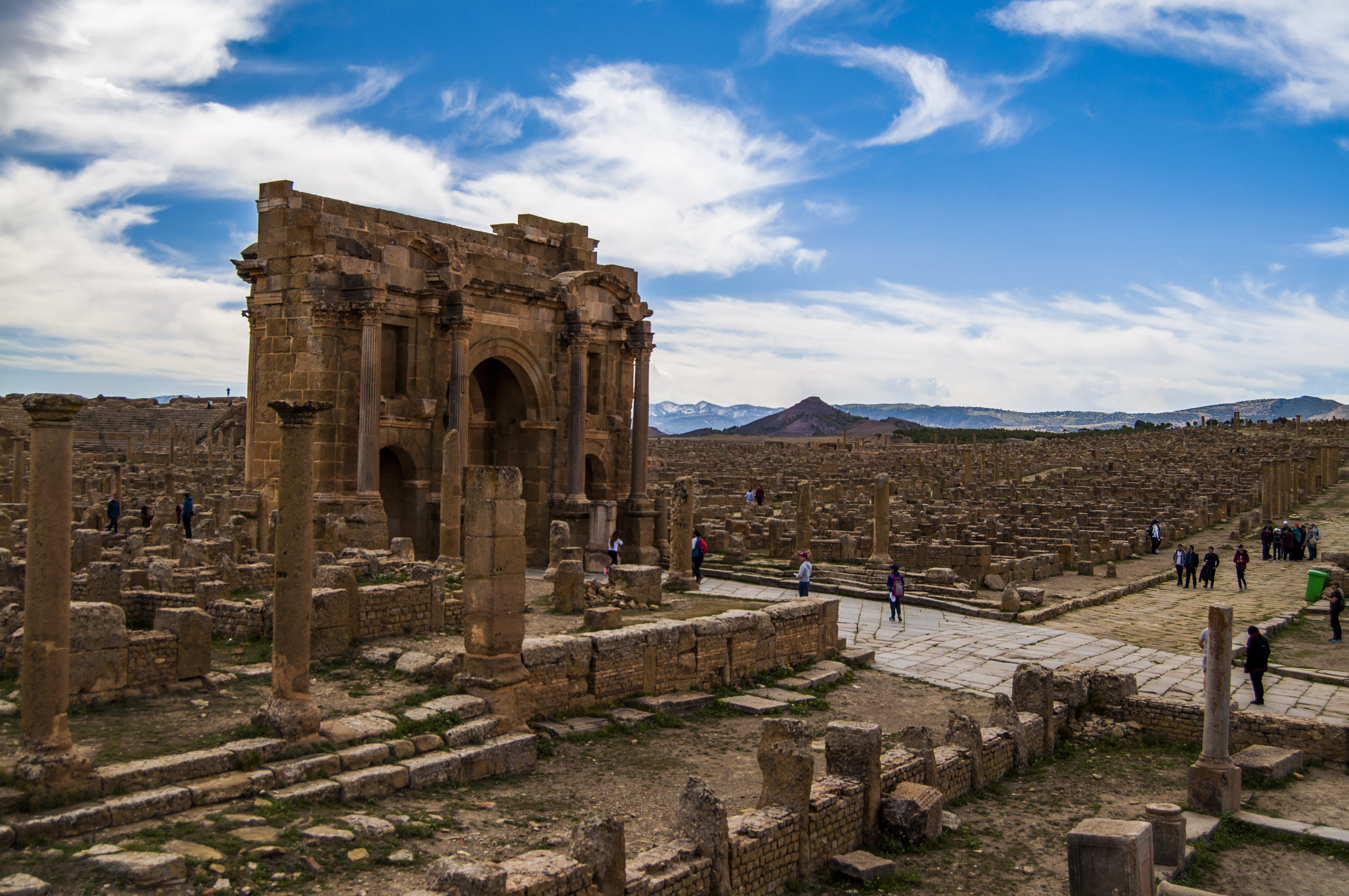
Timgad

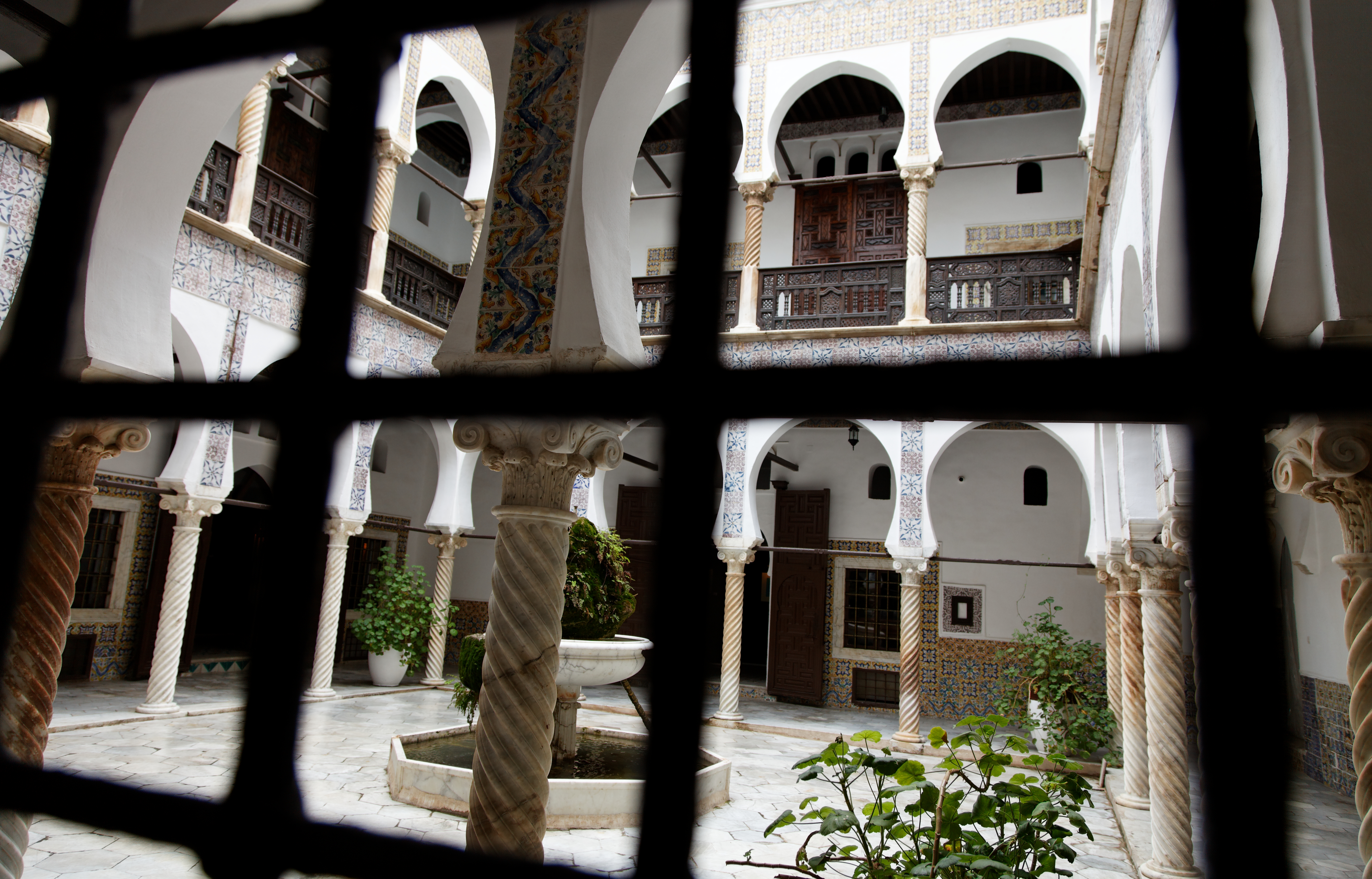
Casbah of Algiers

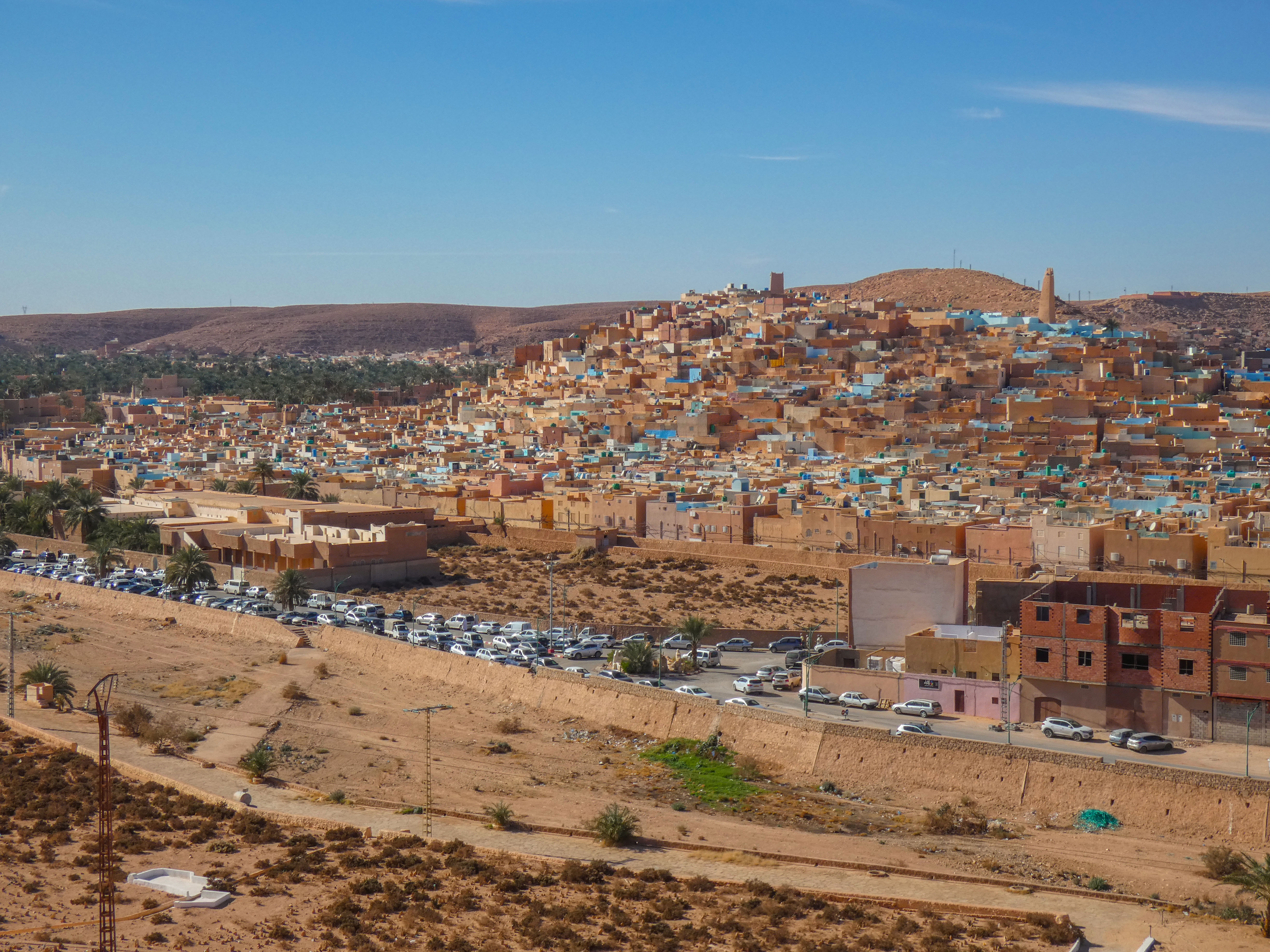
M'zab Valley

=== Tentative list ===
- Archaeological heritage of the city of Tébessa
- El Kala National Park
- Ighamaouen, the Collective Fortresses-Granaries of the Touat Gourara Tidikelt Cultural Park
- Ksour of the Algerian Saharan Atlas
- Nedroma and the Trara
- Oasis Landscape of Oued Souf
- The Augustinian Routes in Algeria
- Djurdjura National Park
- The Royal Mausoleums of Ancient Algeria (from the 4th century BC to the 6th century AD)
- Tefedest Massif in the Ahaggar Cultural Park
- The oasis systems of the Rhoufi and Oued Labiod gorges
- The cultural park of Saoura

== Bahrain ==
=== World Heritage Sites ===
- Pearling, Testimony of an Island Economy
- Dilmun Burial Mounds
- Qal'at al-Bahrain – Ancient Harbour and Capital of Dilmun
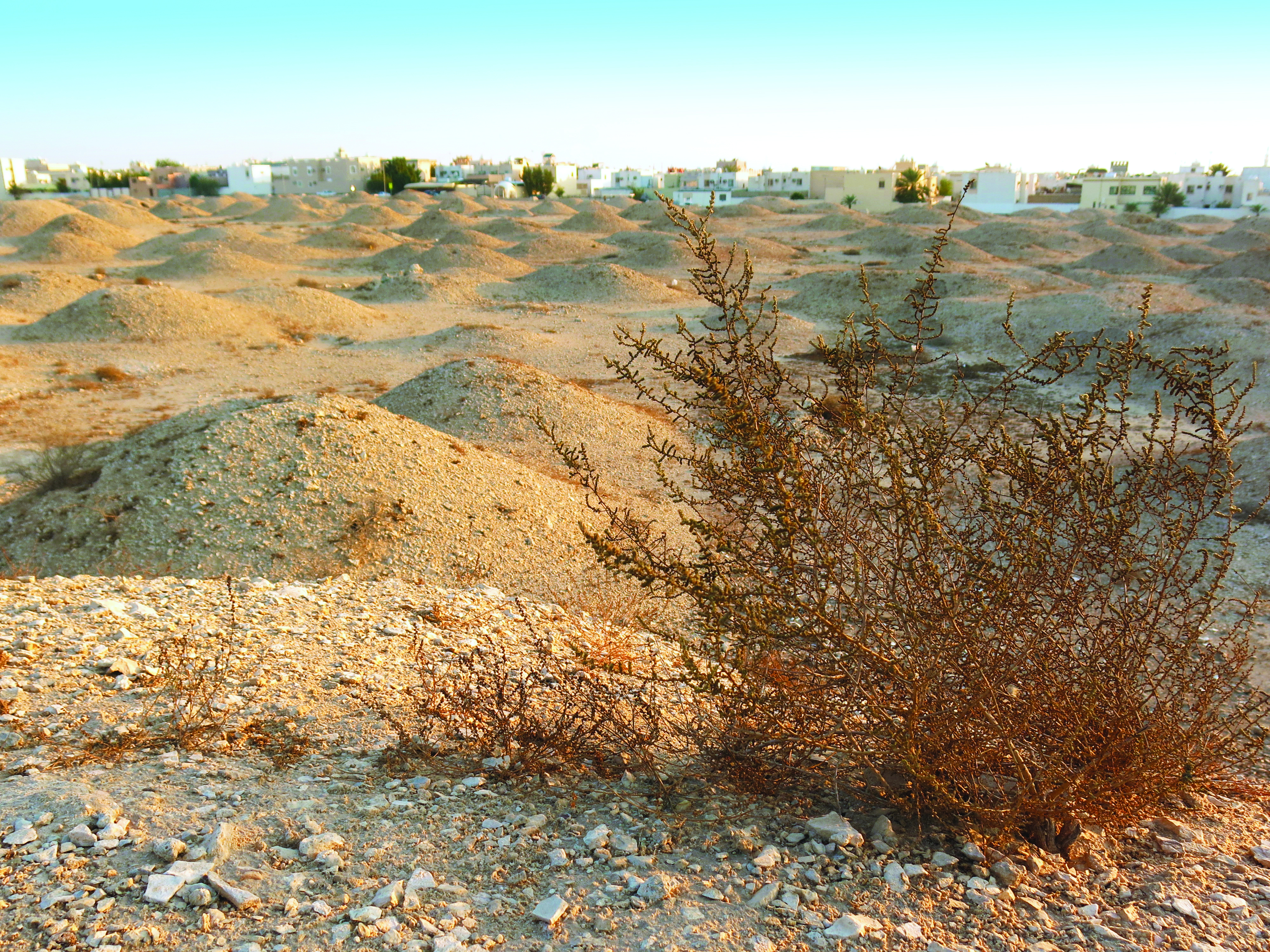
Dilmun Burial Mounds

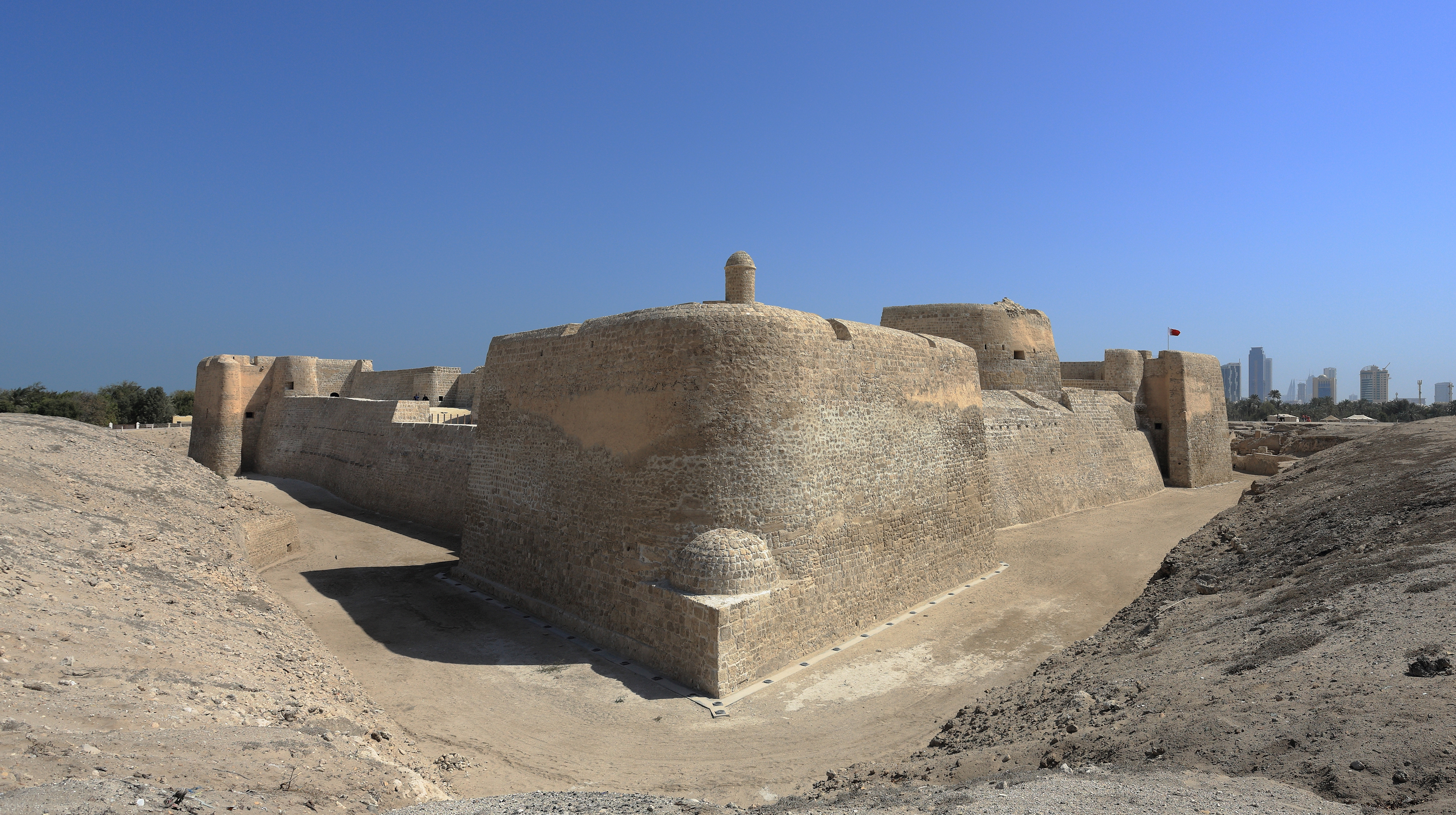
Qal'at al-Bahrain (Bahrain Fort)

=== Tentative list ===
- Awali oil settlement
- Barbar Temple
- Hawar Islands Reserve
- Khor Hamad Town Tumuli Moundfield
- Manama, City of Trade, Multiculturalism and Religious Coexistence
- Saar Heritage Park

== Egypt ==
=== World Heritage Sites ===
- Abu Mena
- Ancient Thebes with its Necropolis
- Historic Cairo
- Nubian Monuments from Abu Simbel to Philae
- Memphis and its Necropolis – the Pyramid Fields from Giza to Dahshur
- Saint Catherine Area
- Wadi Al-Hitan (Whale Valley)
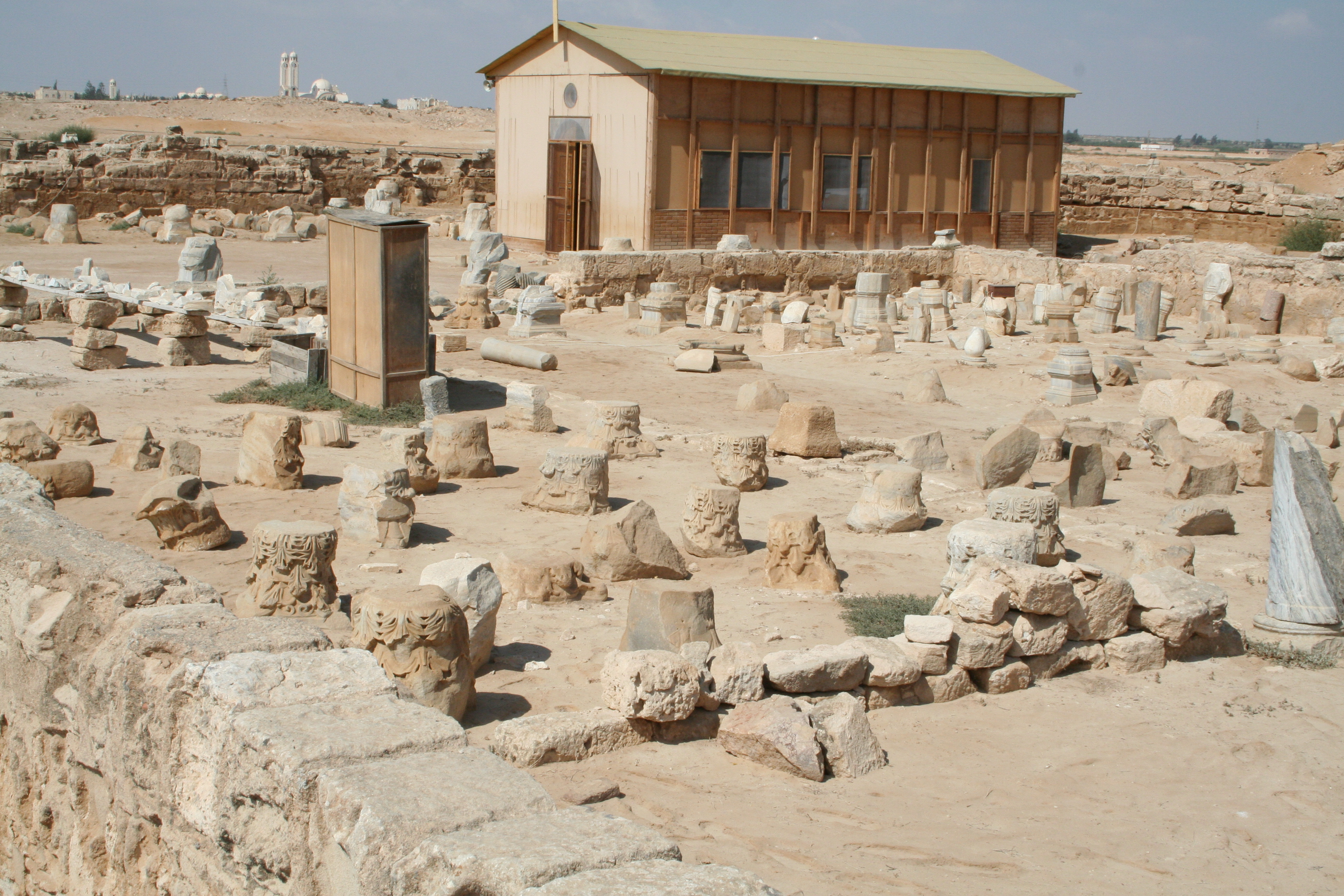
Abu Mena

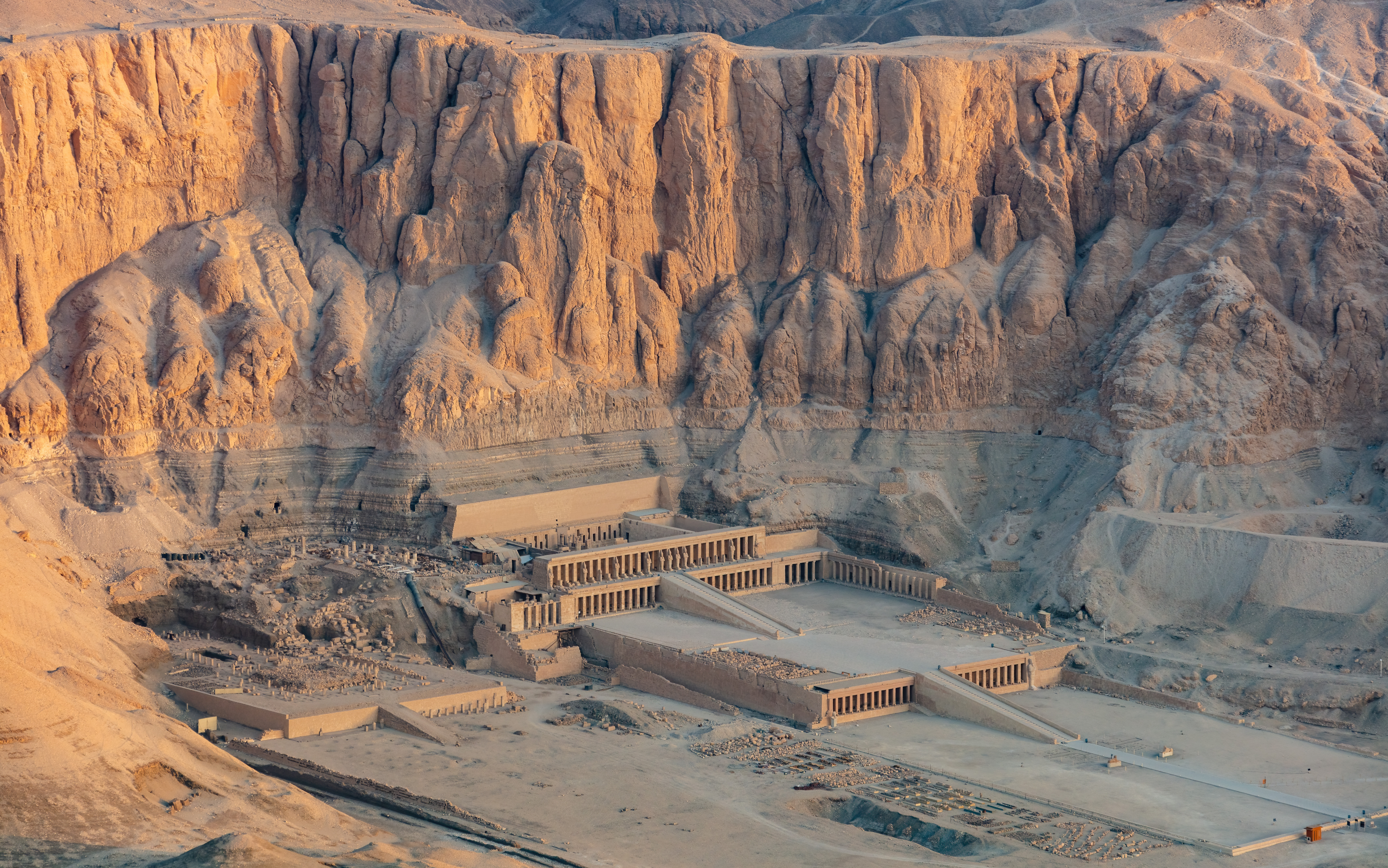
Thebes

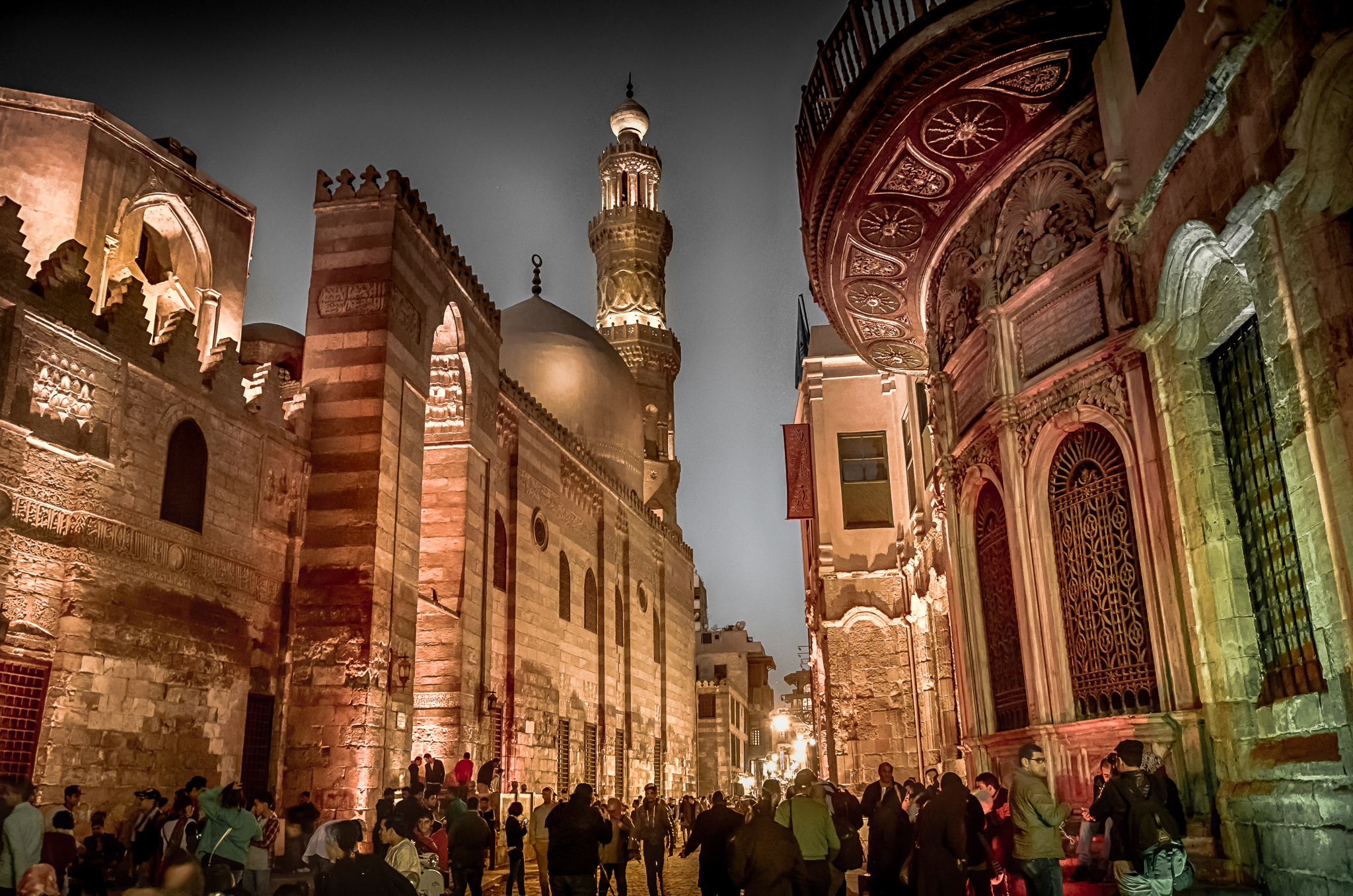
Historic (Islamic) Cairo

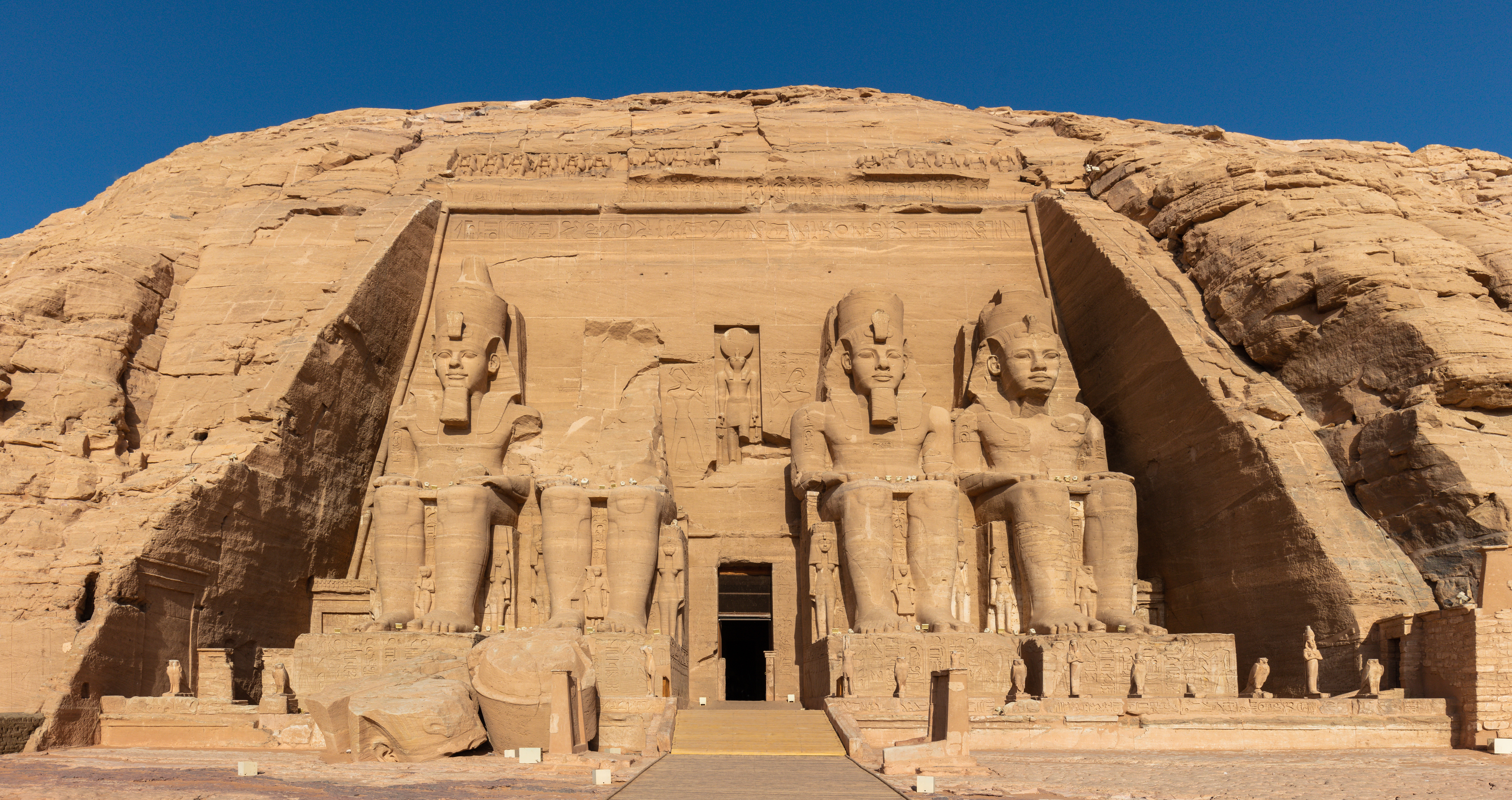
Nubian Monuments of Abu Simbel

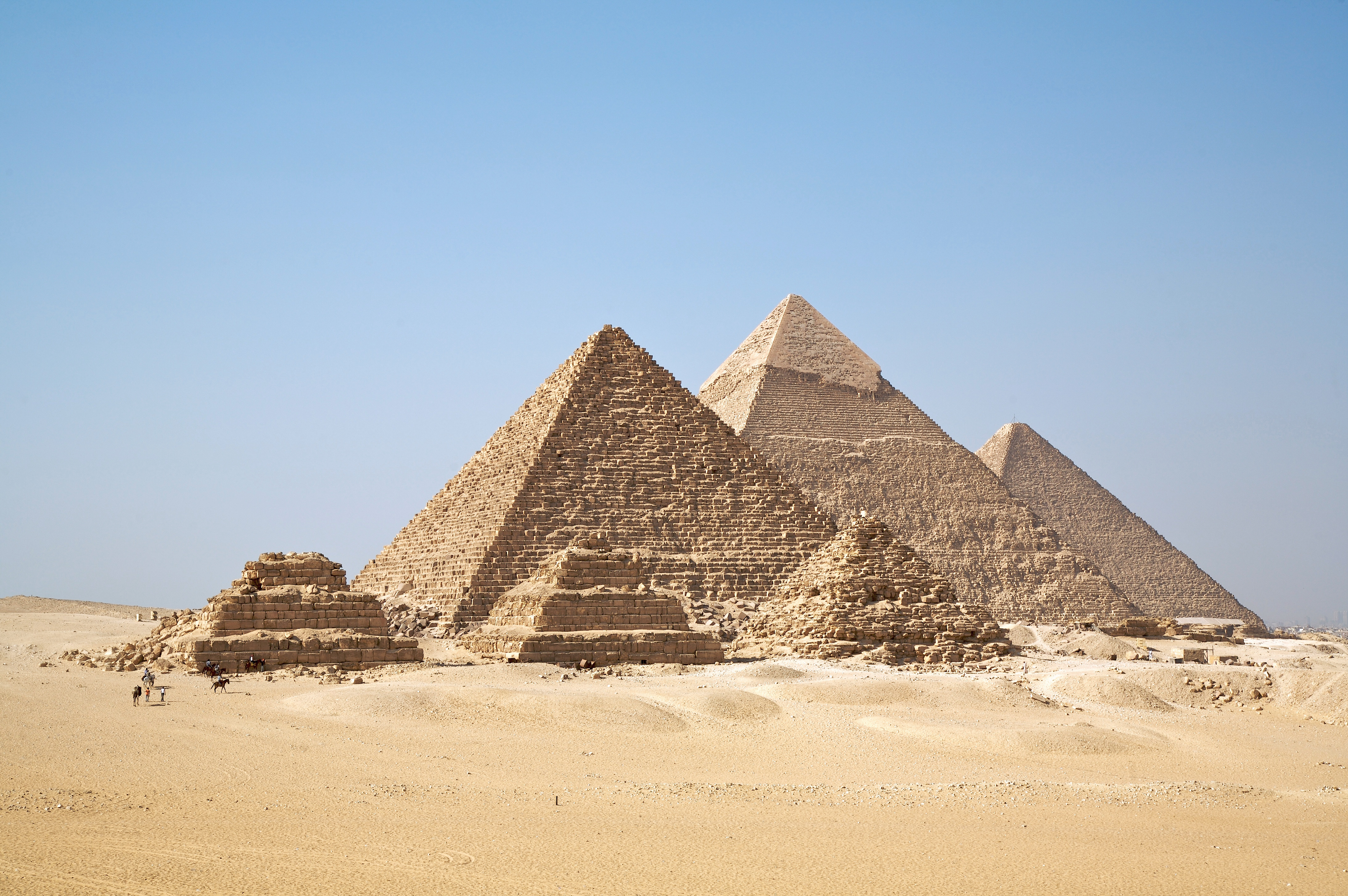
Giza pyramid complex

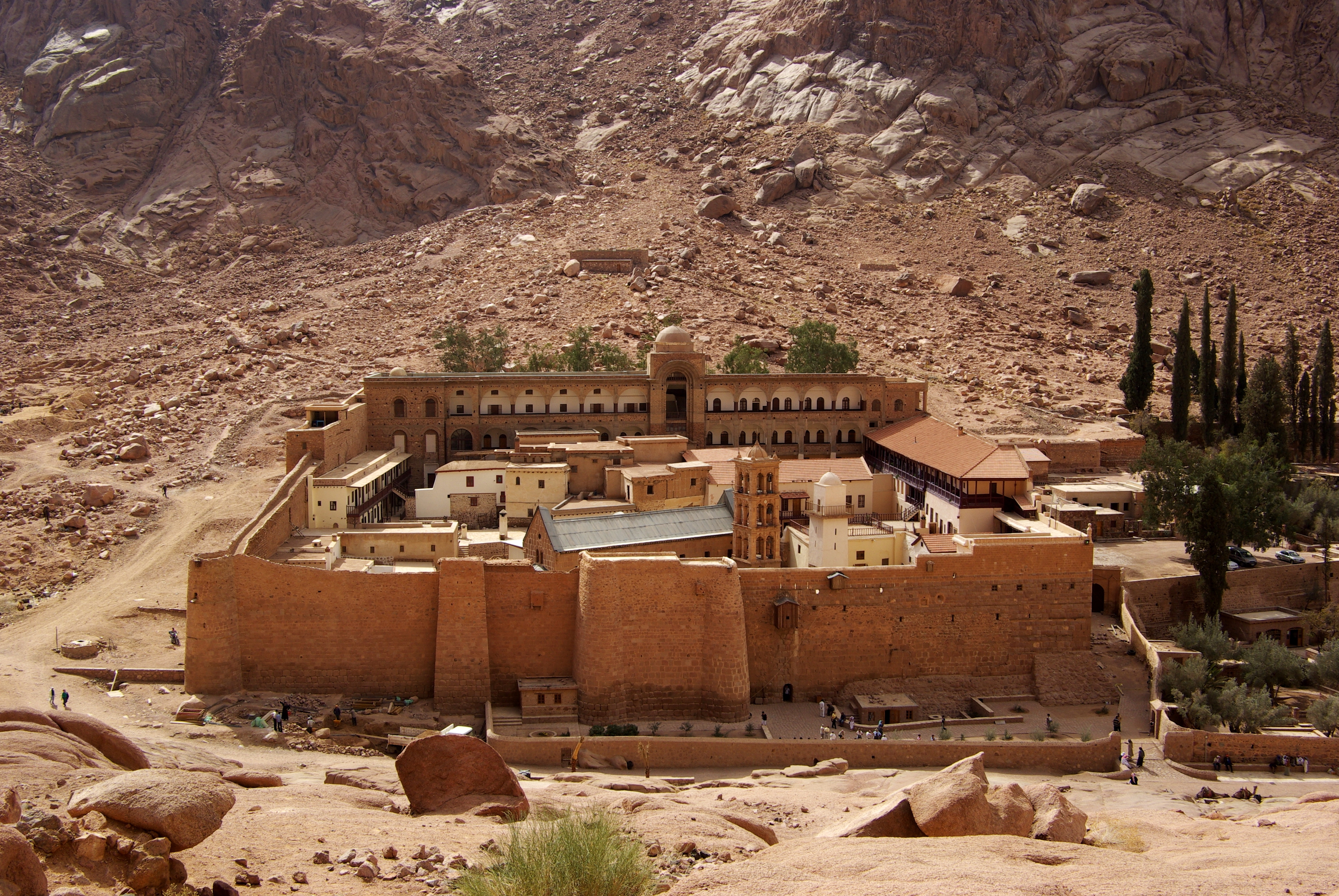
Saint Catherine's Monastery

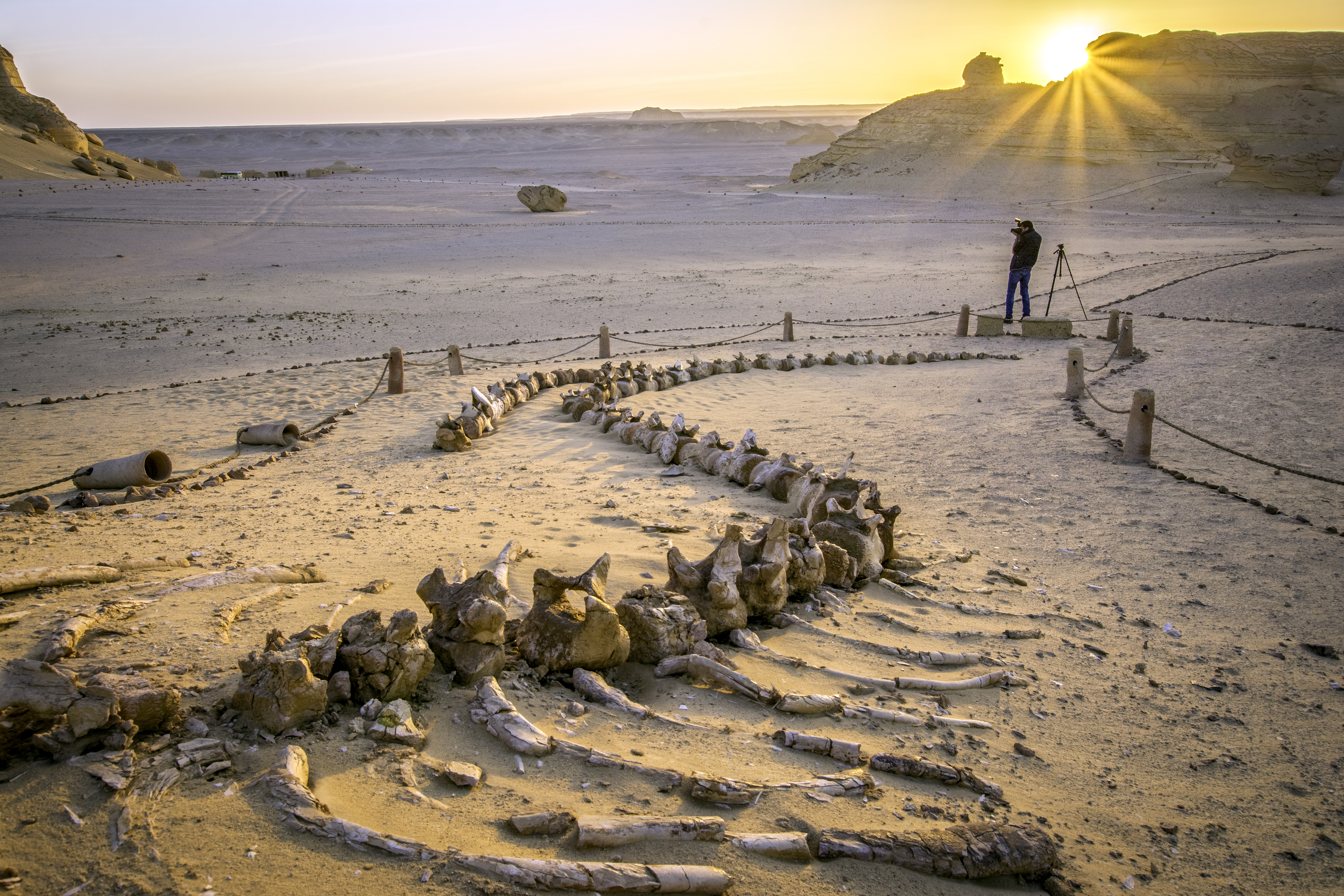
Wadi al Hitan

=== Tentative list ===
- Alexandria, ancient remains and the new library
- Abydos, city of pilgrimage of the Pharaohs
- Bird Migration Routes
- Dababiya
- Dahab
- Dahshour archaeological area
- Desert Wadis
- Egyptian Museum in Cairo
- El-Gendi Fortress
- El Fayoum
- Great Desert Landscapes
- Helwan Observatory
- Historic quarters and monuments of Rosetta/Rachid
- Kharga Oasis and the Small Southern Oases
- Gebel Qatrani Area, Lake Qaroun Nature Reserve
- Minia
- Mountain Chains
- Necropolises of Middle Egypt, from the Middle Empire to the Roman period
- Newibah castle
- North Sinai Archaeological Sites Zone
- Oasis of Fayoum, hydraulic remains and ancient cultural landscapes
- Pharaon Island
- Pharaonic temples in Upper Egypt from the Ptolemaic and Roman periods
- Raoudha nilometre in Cairo
- Ras Mohammed
- Rutho Monastery
- Temple of Serabit Khadem
- Southern and Smaller Oases, the Western Desert
- Siwa archaeological area
- Temple of Hator built by Ramses III'
- The An-Nakhl fortress, a stage on the pilgrimage route to Mecca
- The monasteries of the Arab Desert and Wadi Natrun
- Two citadels in Sinai from the Saladin period (Al-Gundi and Pharaoh's island)
- Wadi Feiran

== Iraq ==
=== World Heritage Sites ===
- Ashur (Qal'at Sherqat)
- Erbil Citadel
- Hatra
- Samarra Archaeological City
- The Ahwar of Southern Iraq: Refuge of Biodiversity and the Relict Landscape of the Mesopotamian Cities
- Babylon
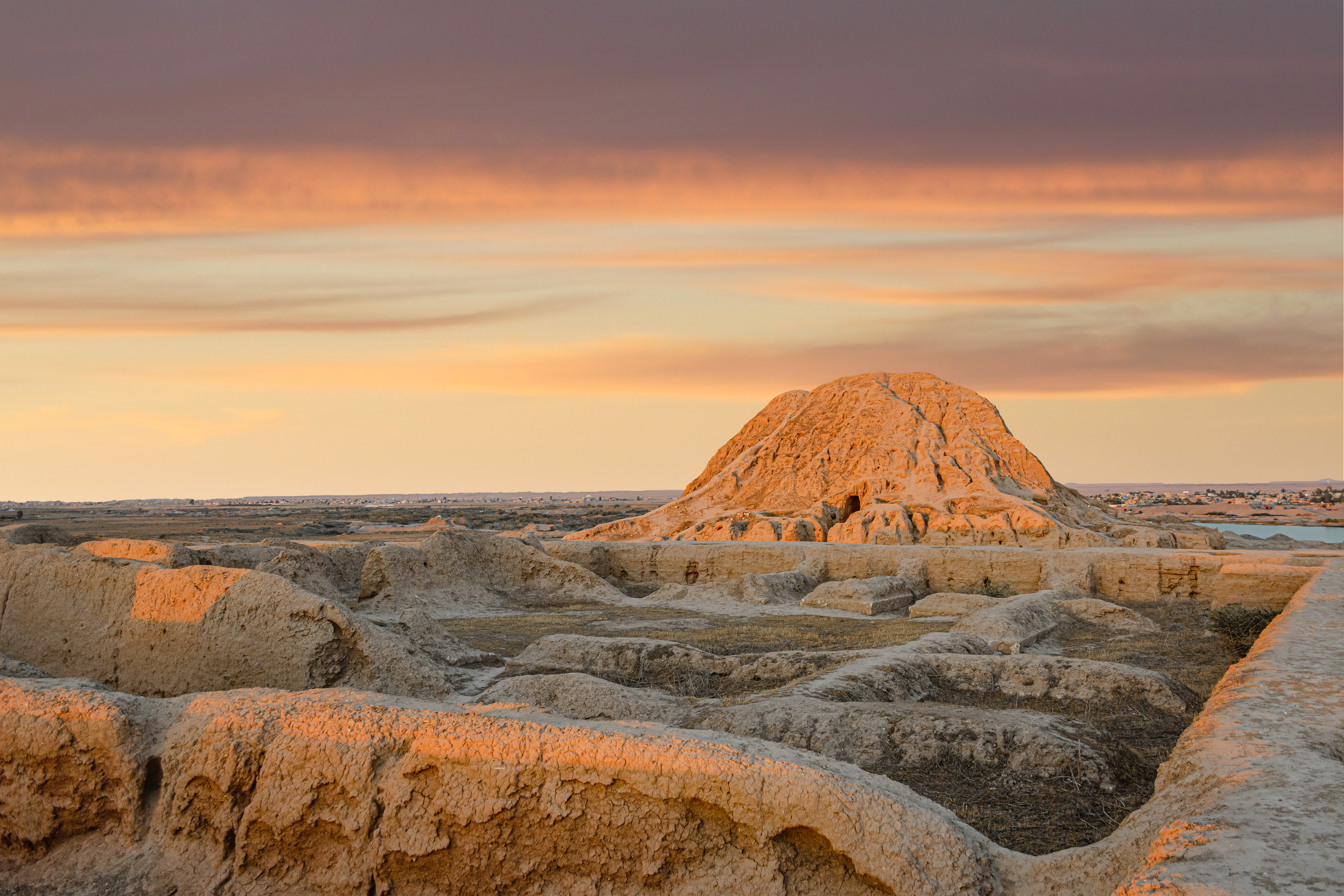
Ashur (Qal'at Sherqat)

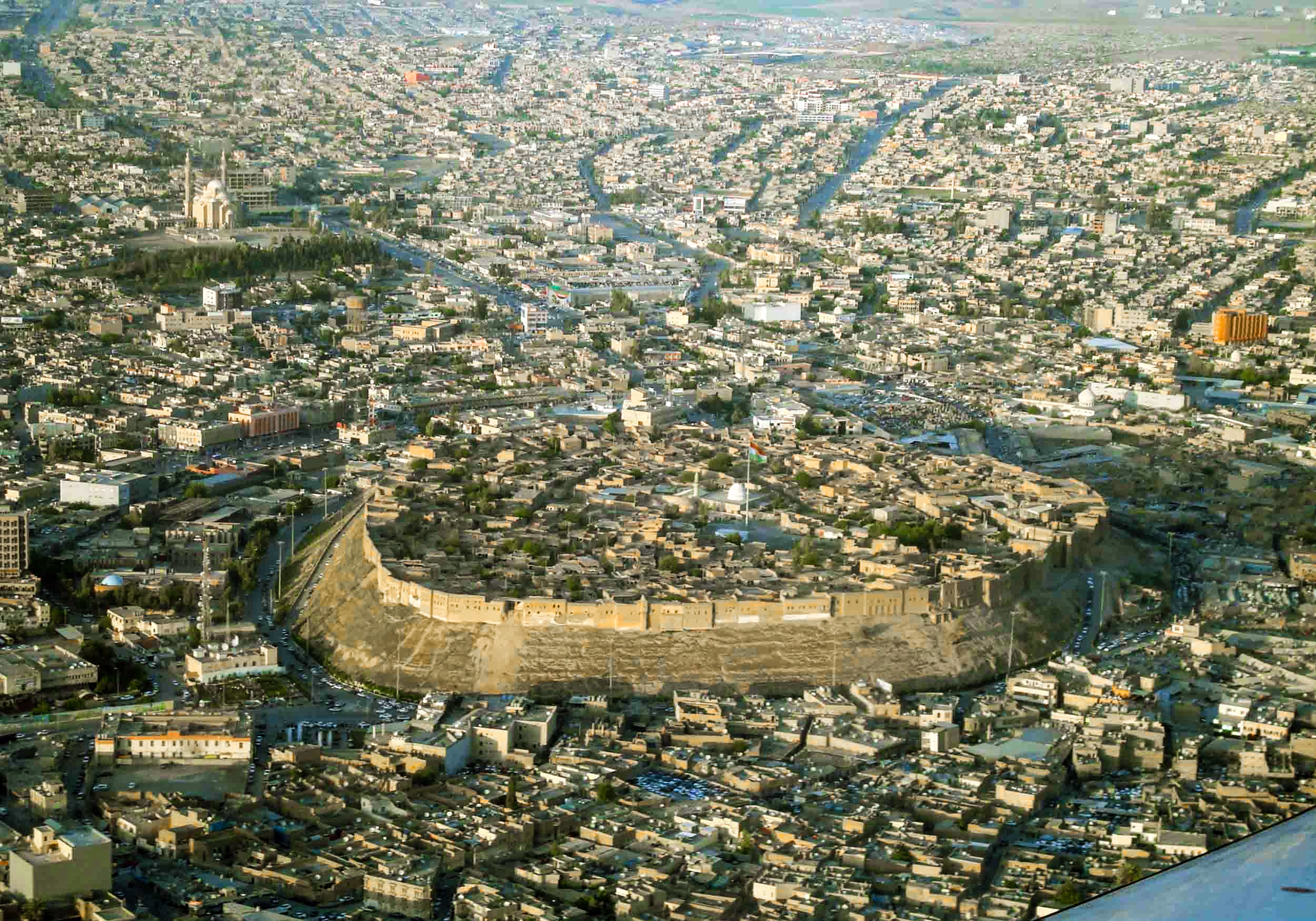
Citadel of Erbil

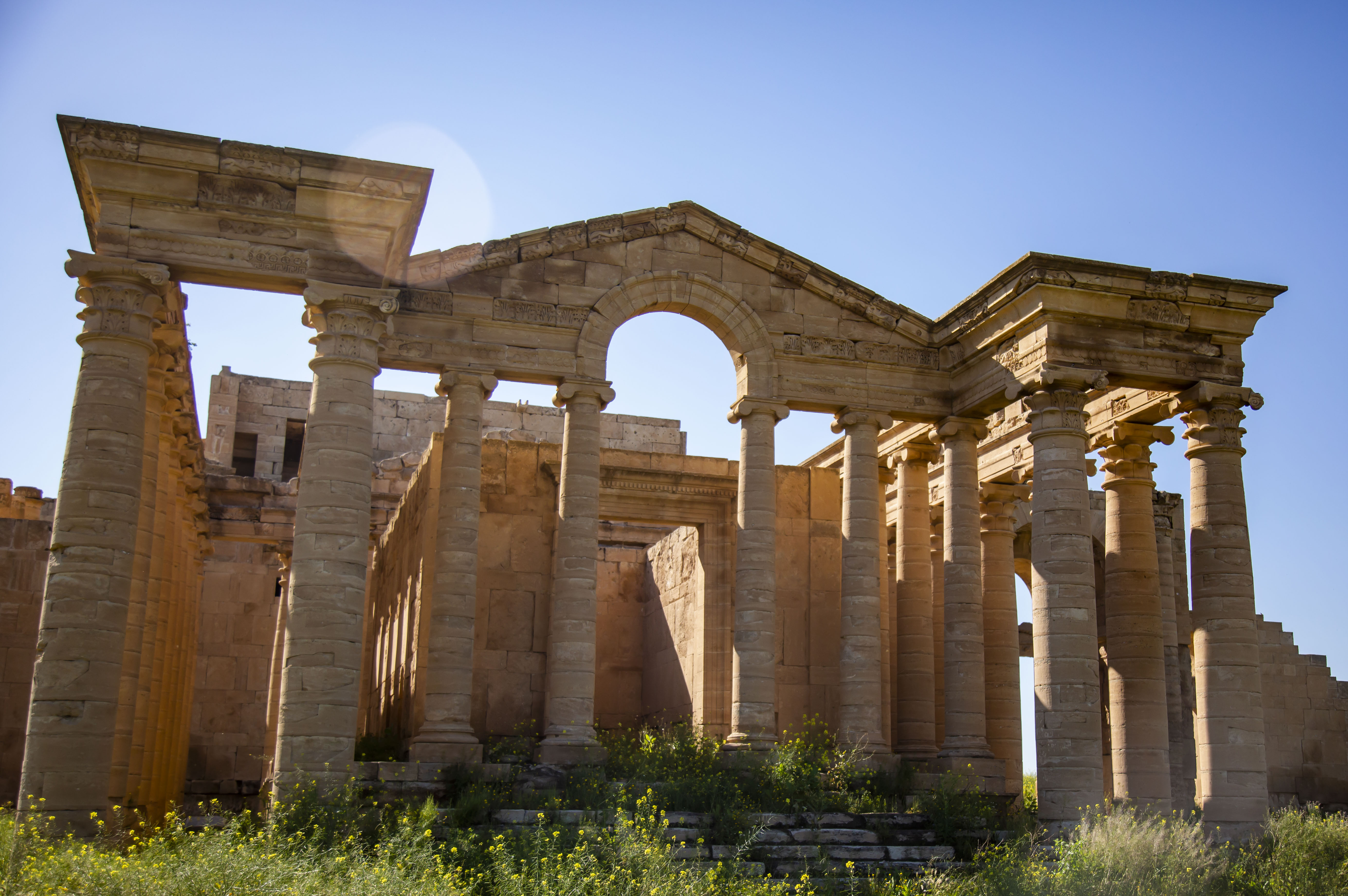
Hatra

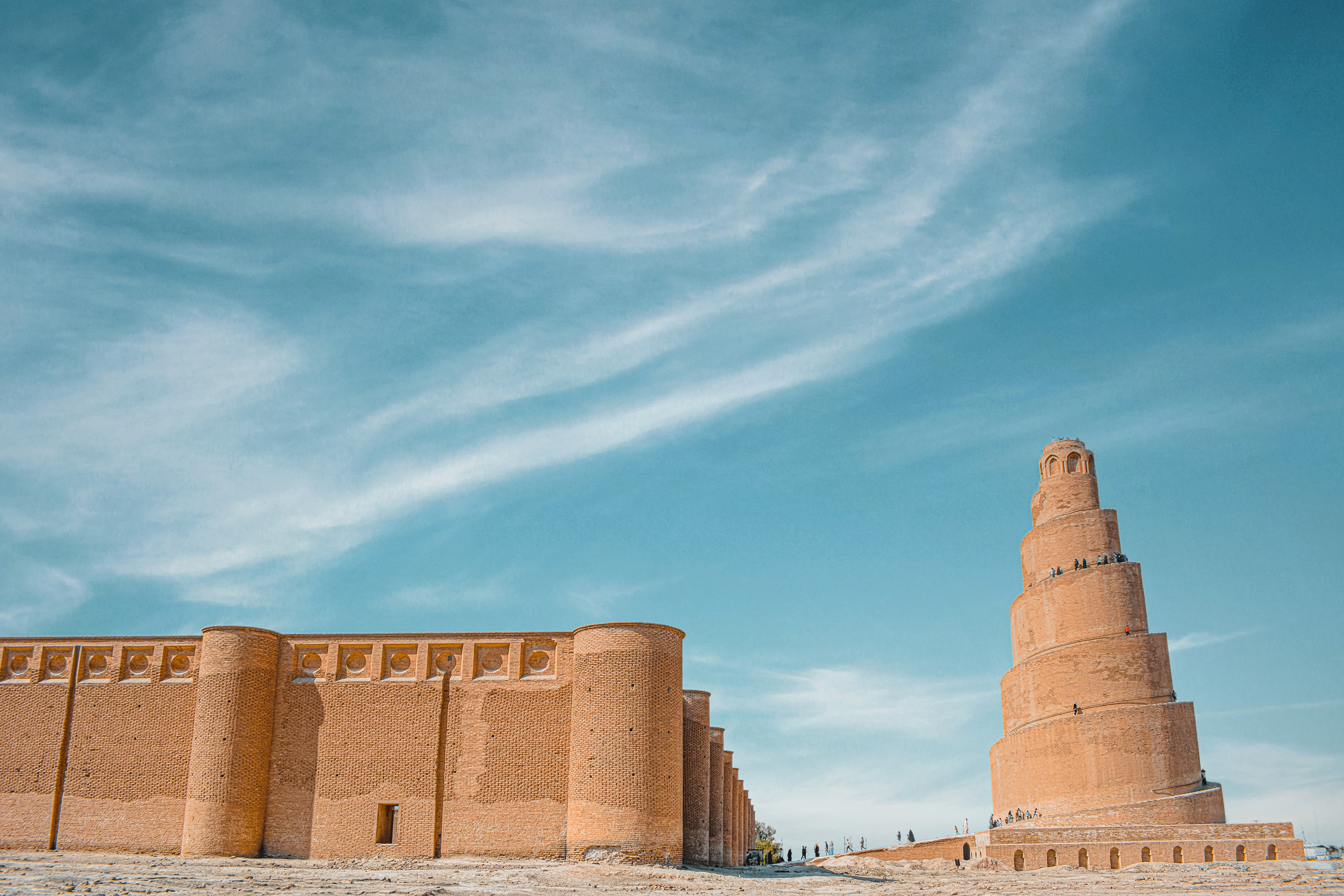
Samarra

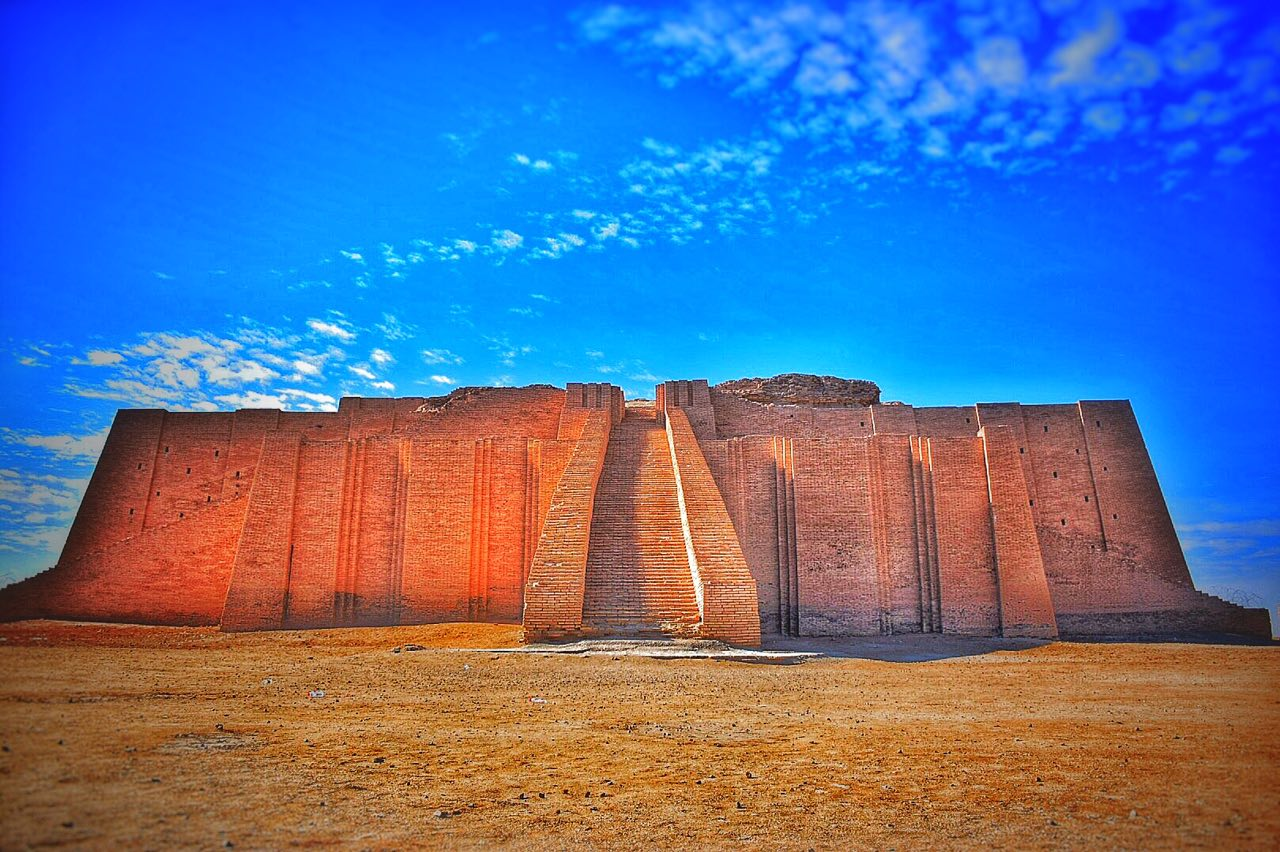
Ahwar of Southern Iraq

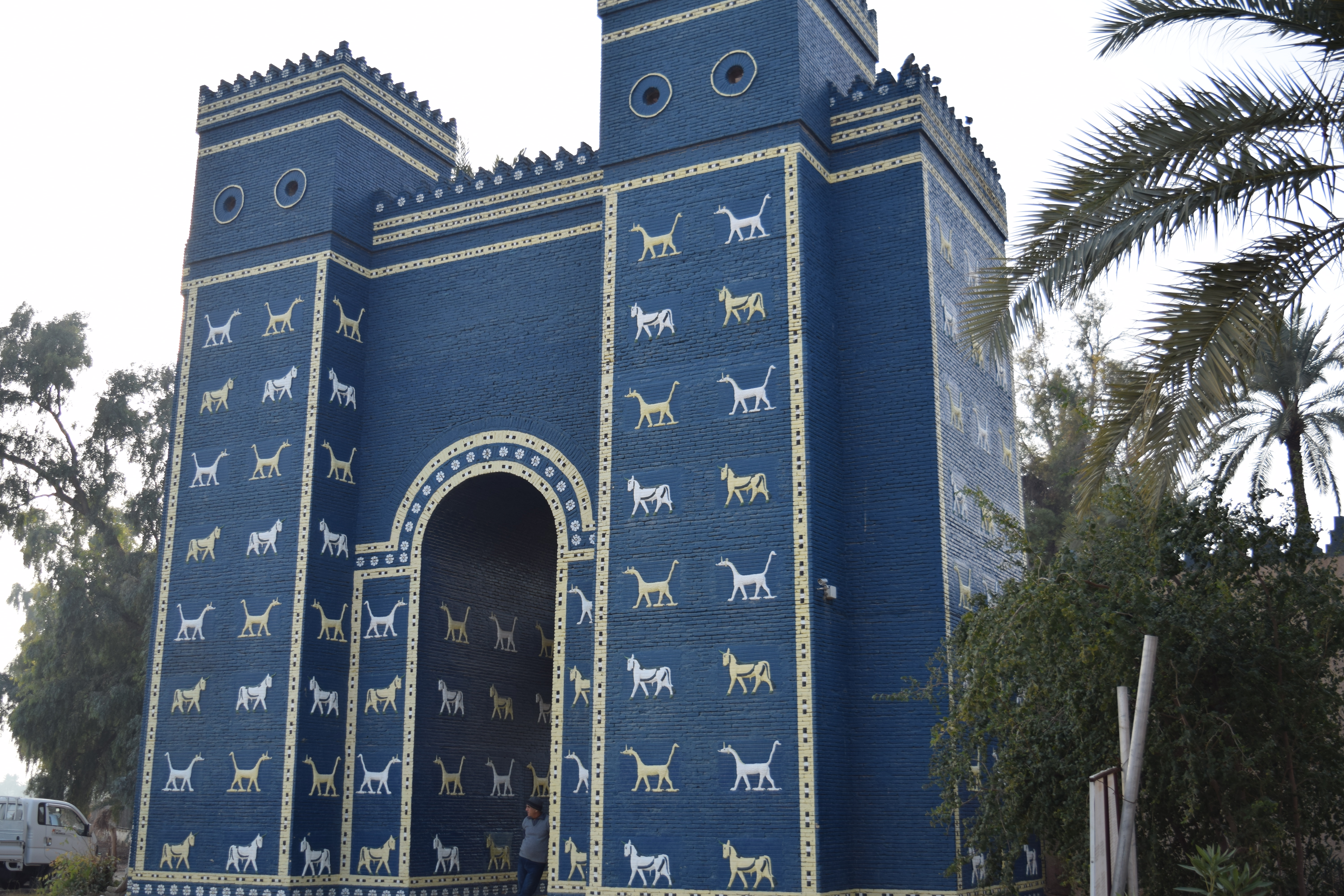
Babylon

=== Tentative list ===
- Archaeological site of Aqar Quf (ancient Dur-Kurigalzu)
- Bestansur Neolithic settlement
- The Fortress of Al-Ukhaidar
- Nimrud
- The Ancient City of Nineveh
- The Site of Thilkifl
- Wadi Al-Salam Cemetery in Najaf
- Wasit
- Amedy city
- Historical Features of the Tigris River in Baghdad Rusafa, which extends from the school Al-Mustansiriya to the Abbasid Palace
- Nippur
- Old City of Mosul
- Lalish Temple
- Kirkuk Citadel
- The Hajj Pilgrimage Routes: The Darb Zubaydah

== Jordan ==
=== World Heritage Sites ===
- Petra
- Quseir Amra
- Um er-Rasas (Kastrom Mefa'a)
- Wadi Rum Protected Area
- Baptism Site "Bethany Beyond the Jordan" (Al-Maghtas)
- As-Salt – The Place of Tolerance and Urban Hospitality
- Umm Al-Jimāl
- Aqaba Marine Reserve
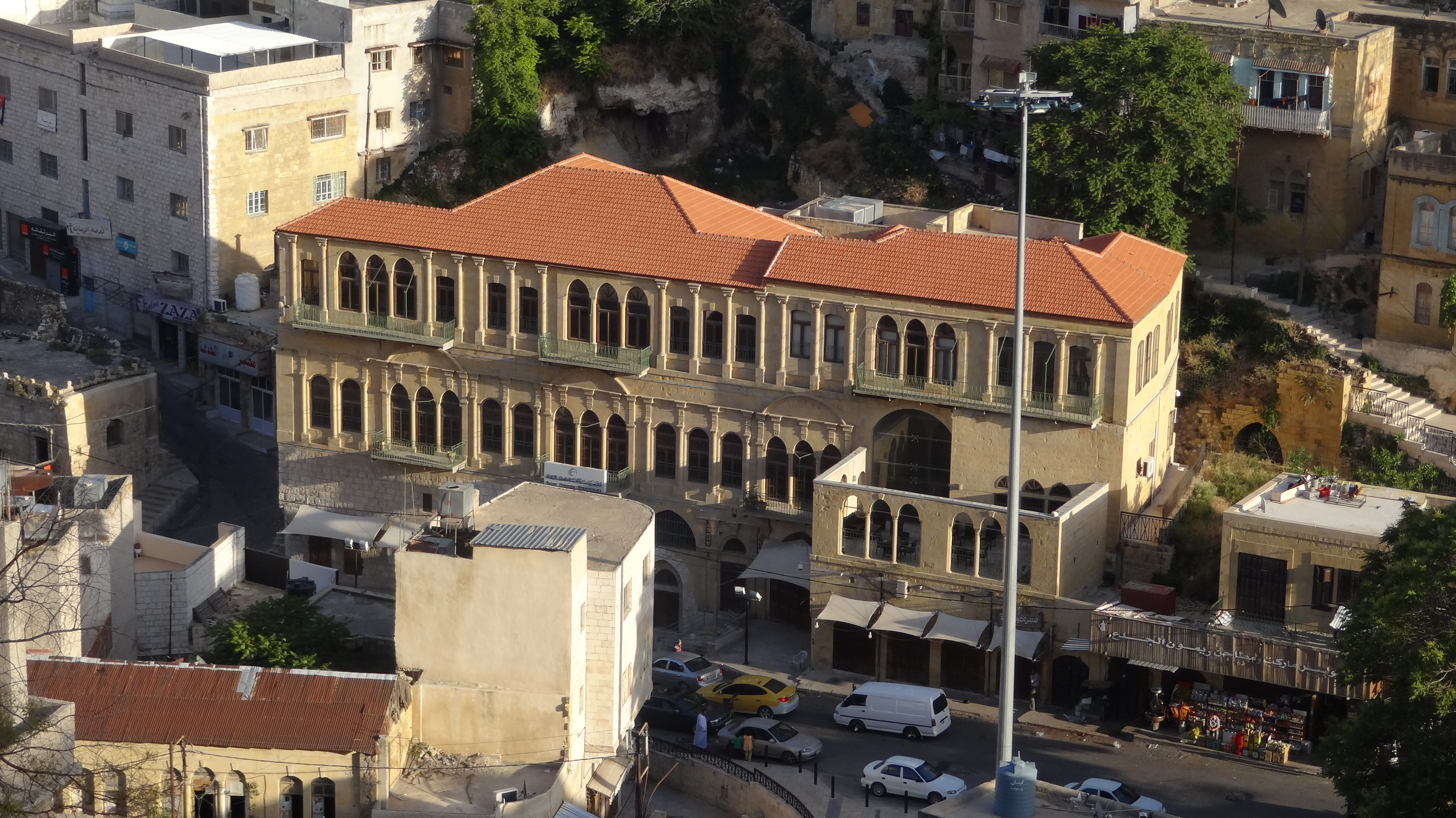
As-Salt

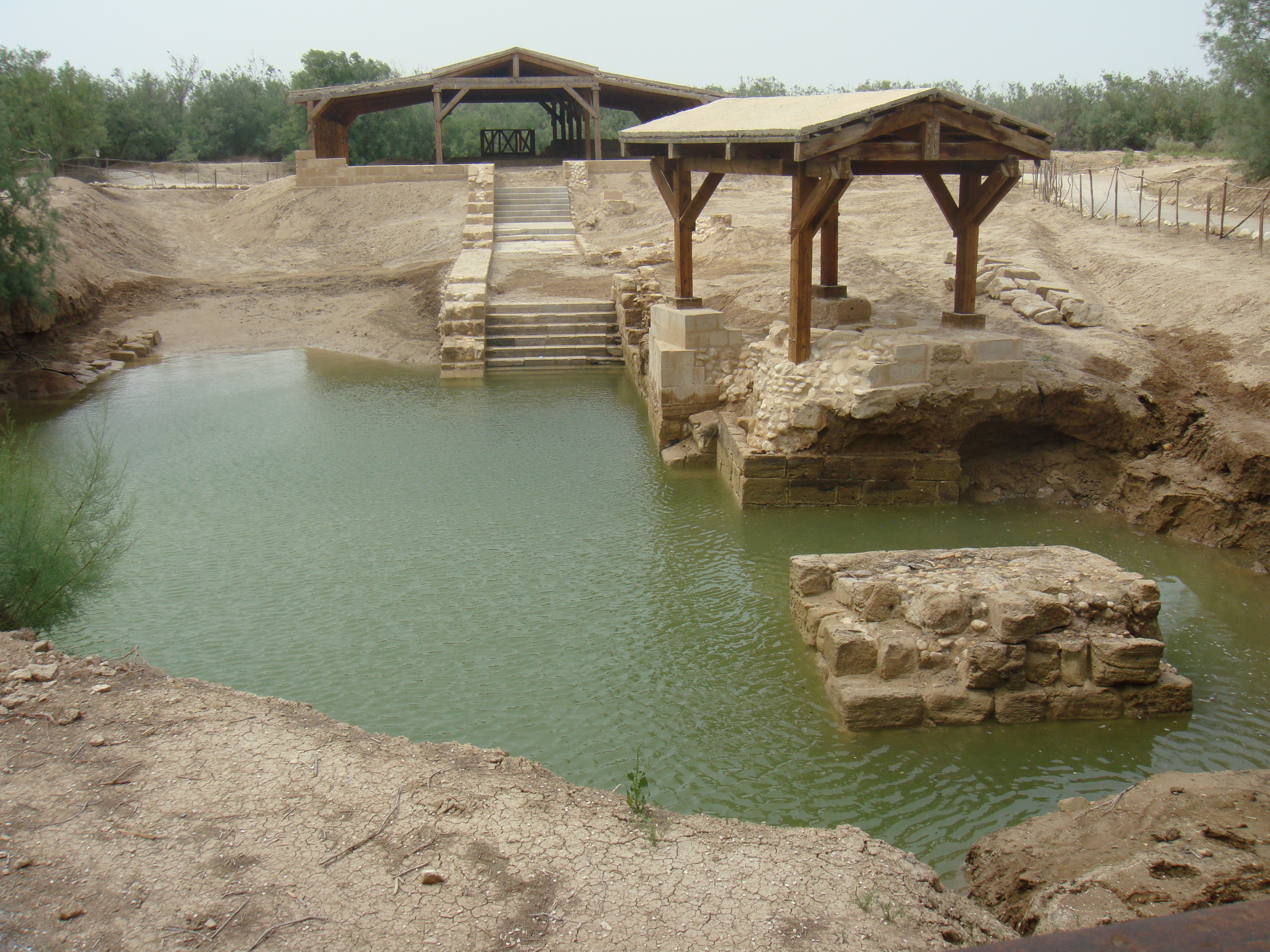
Al-Maghtas

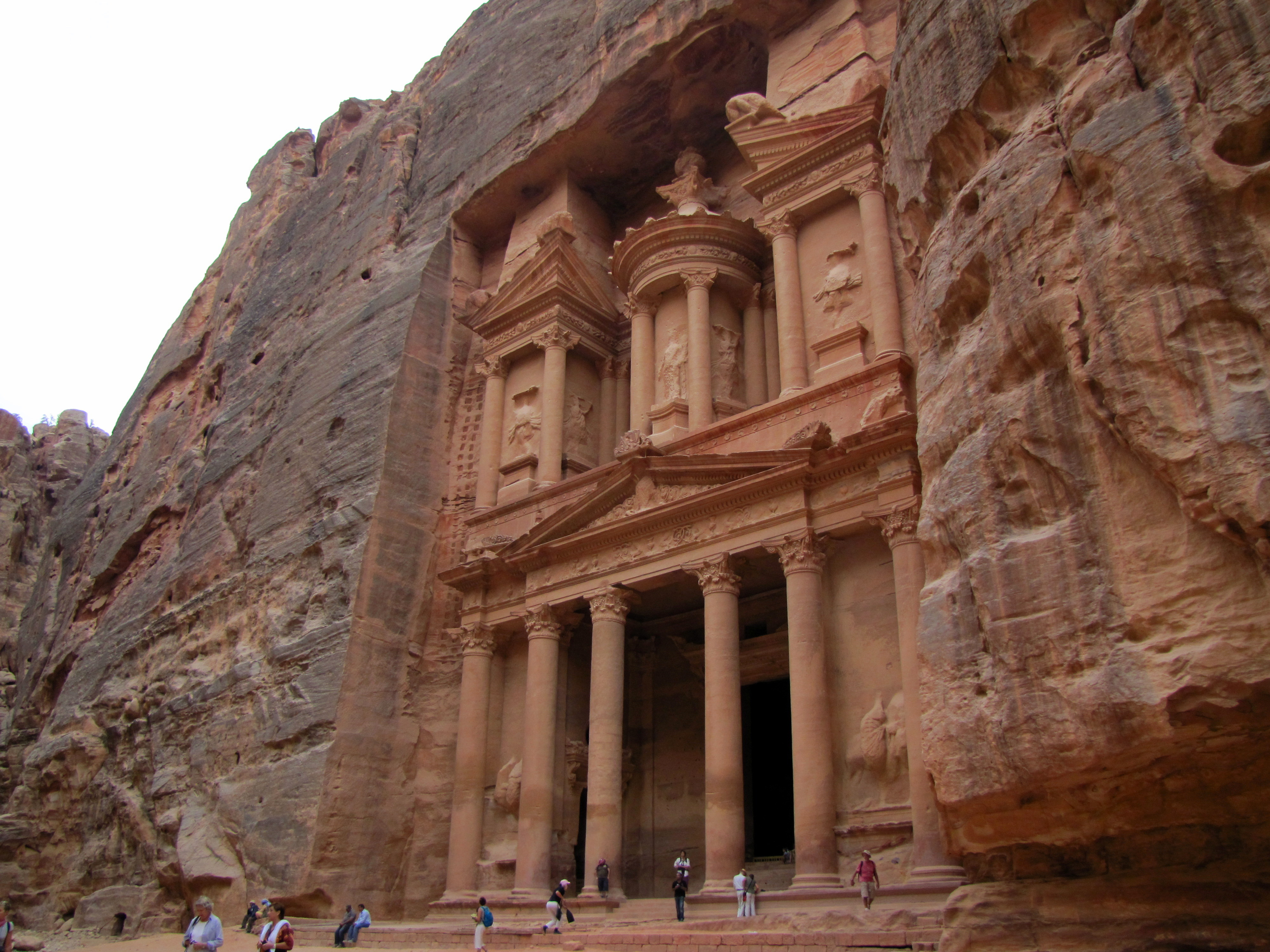
Petra

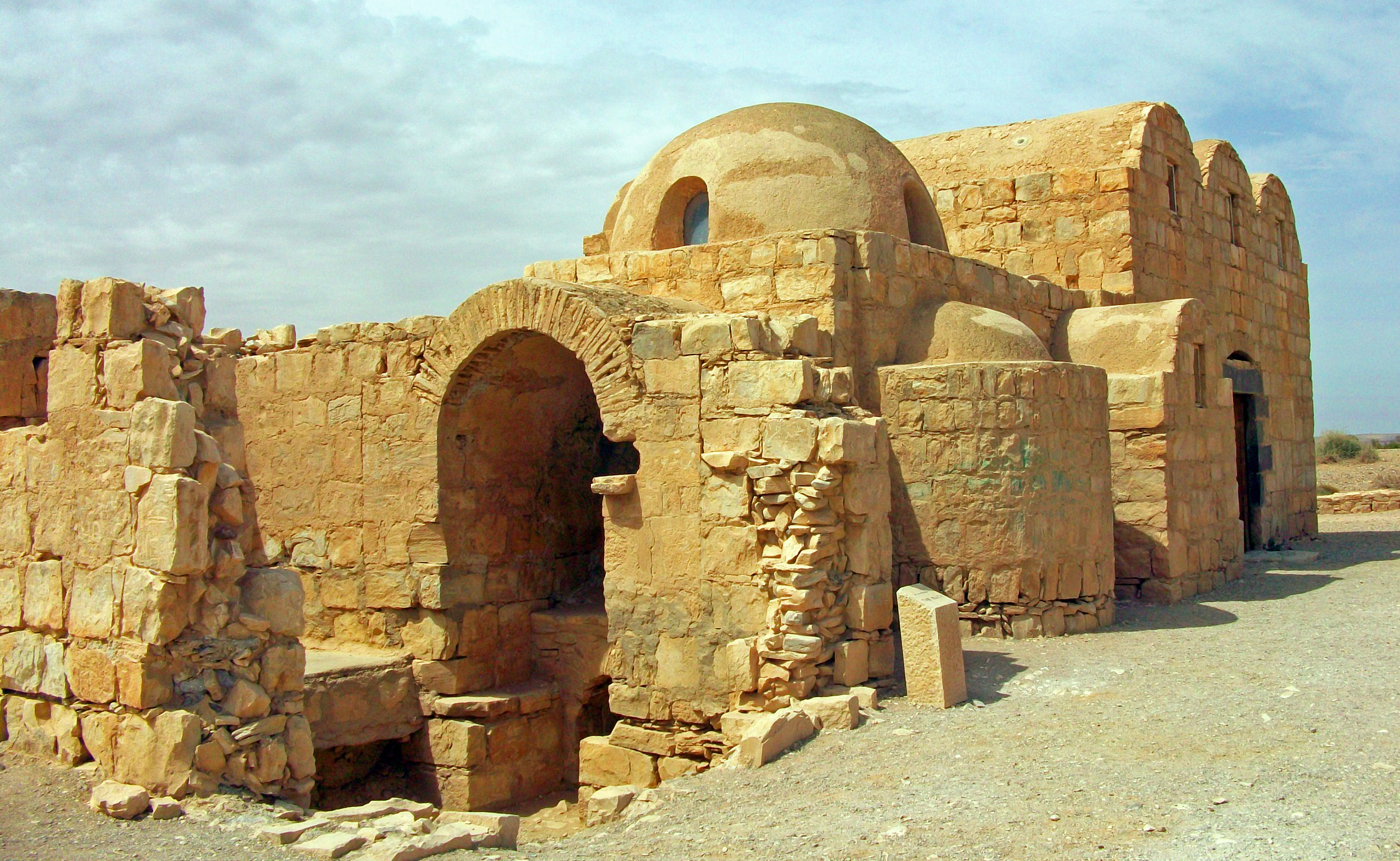
Qusayr 'Amra

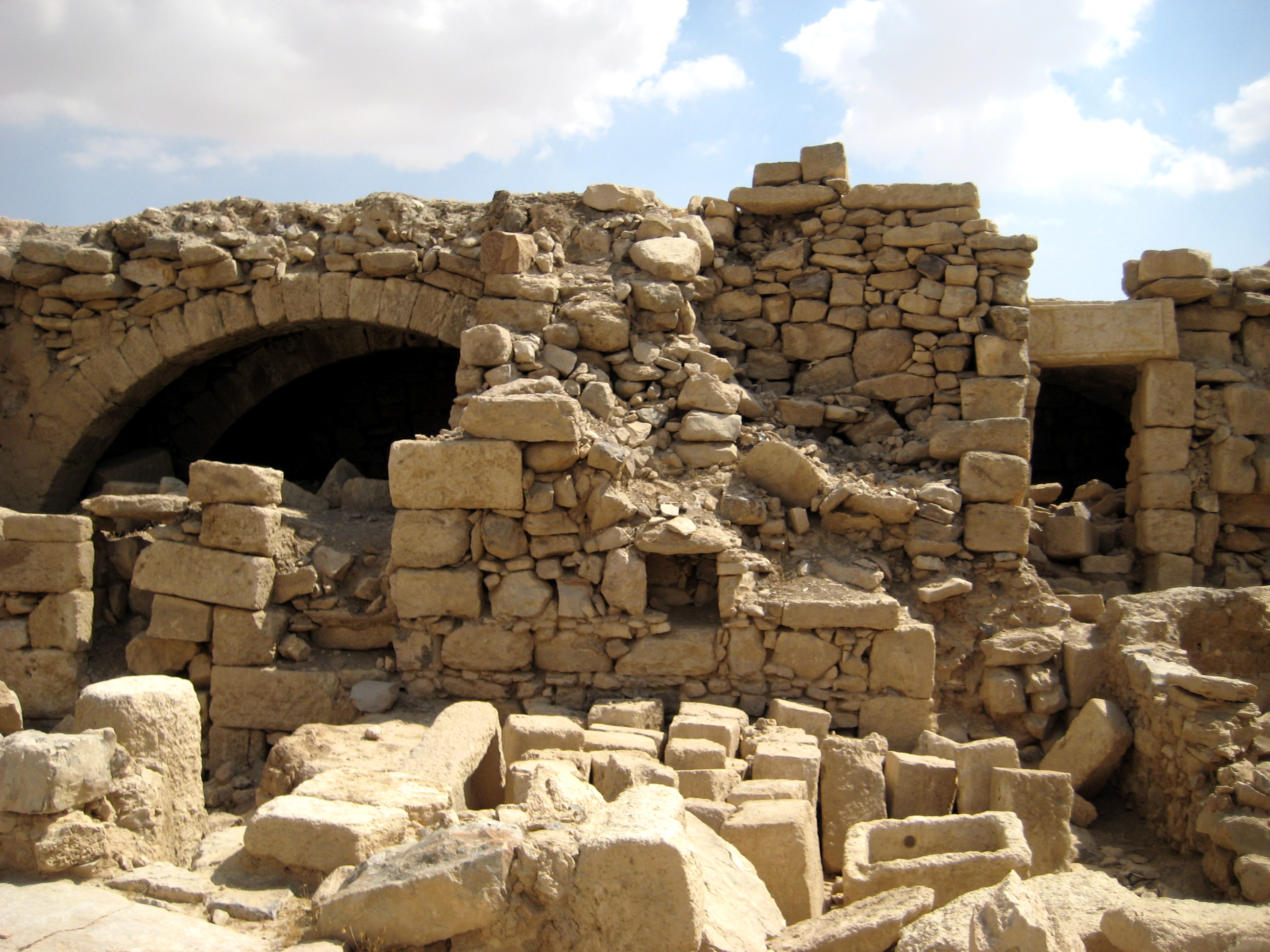
Um ar-Rasas

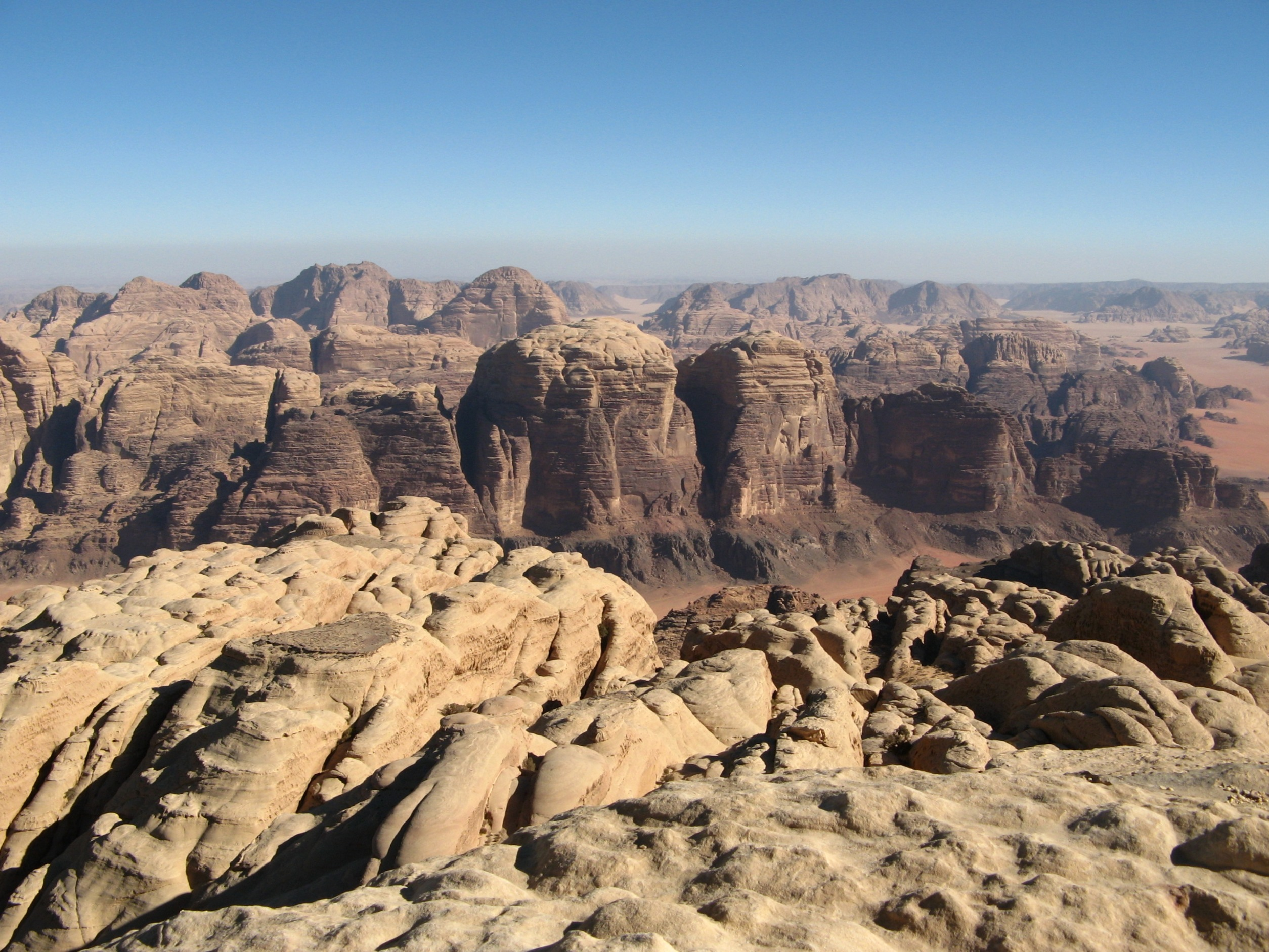
Wadi Rum

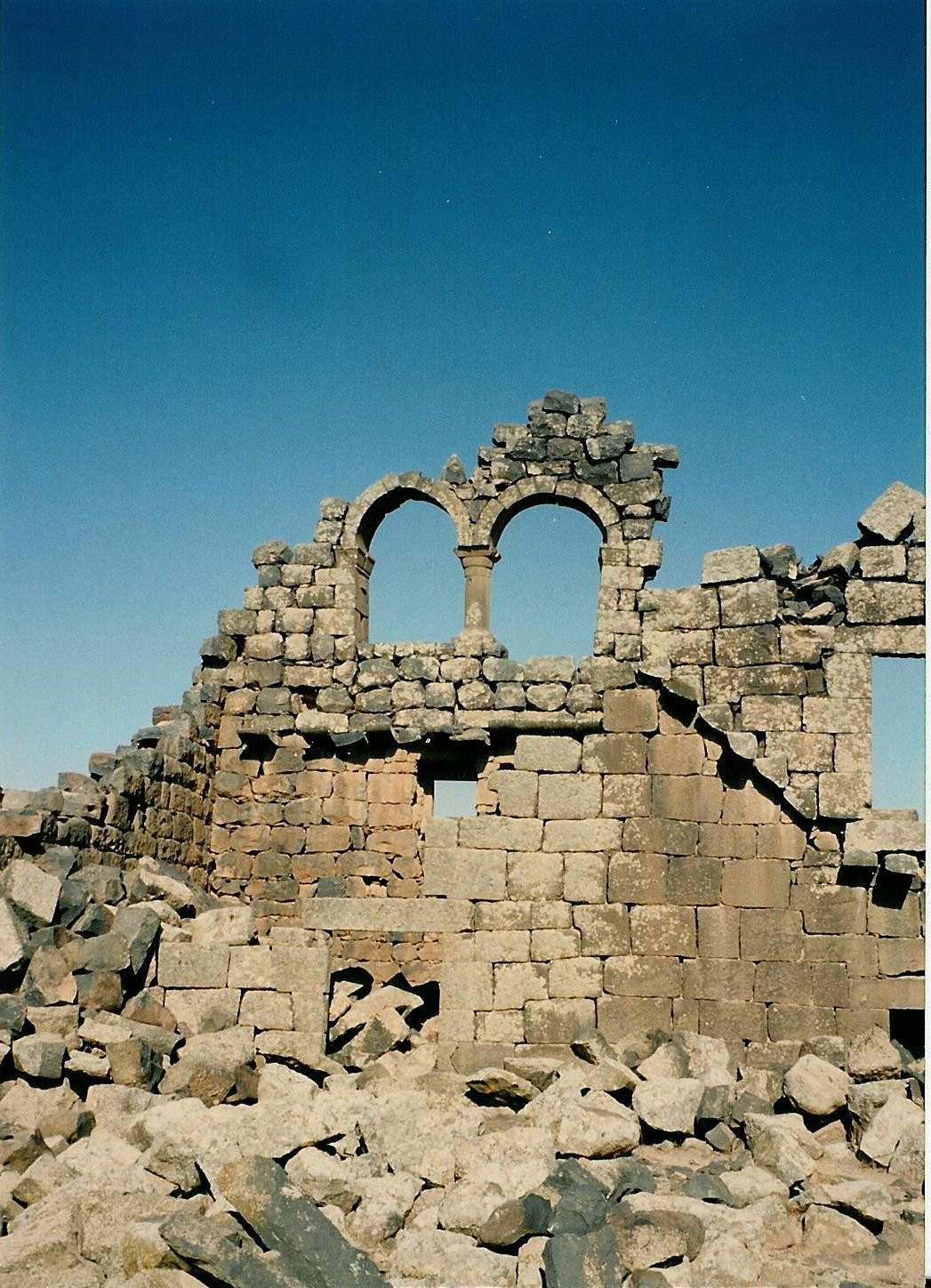
Umm Al-Jimāl

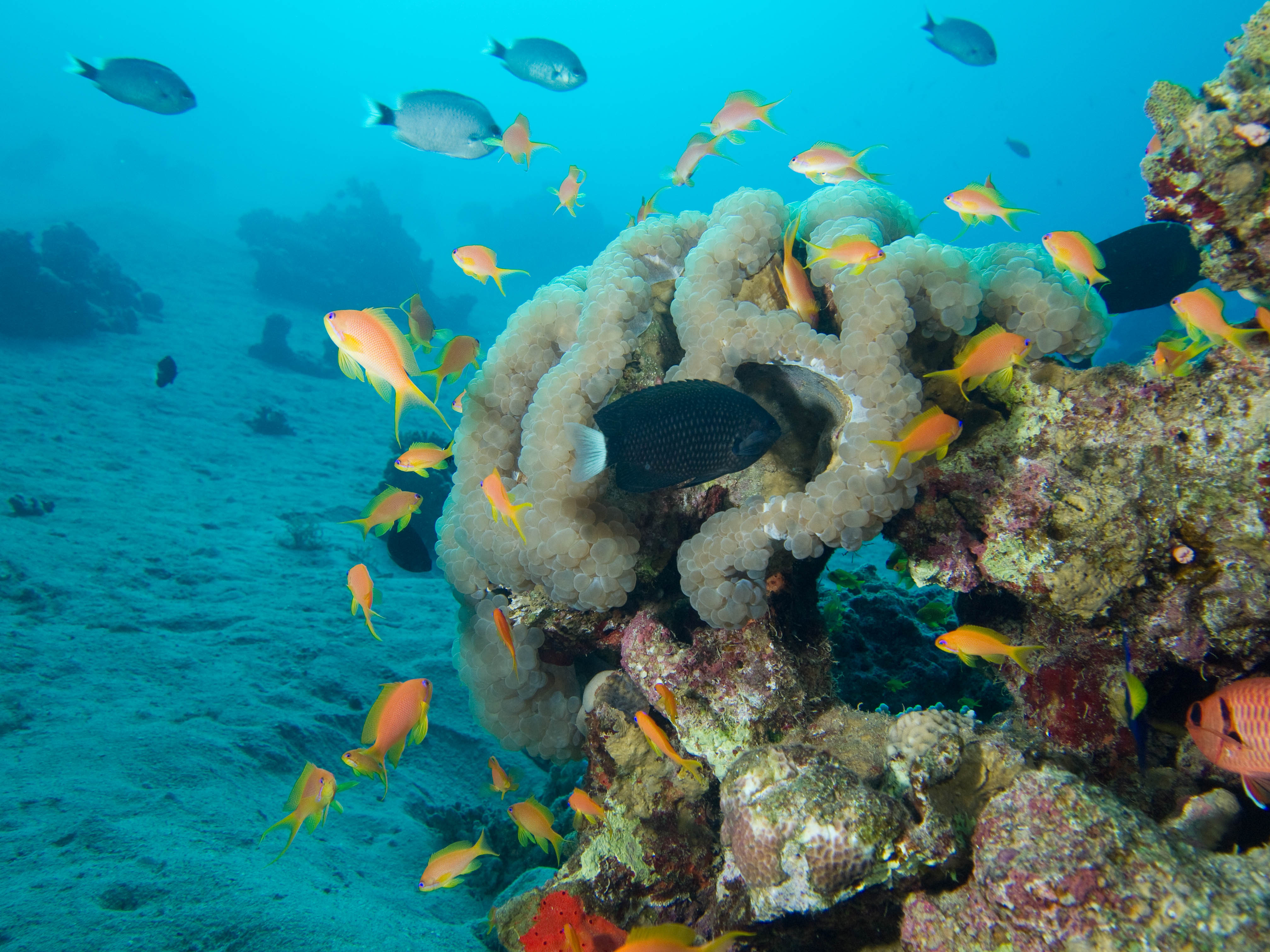
Aqaba Marine Reserve

=== Tentative list ===
- Al Qastal (Settlement)
- Azraq
- The Sanctuary of Agios Lot, At Deir 'Ain 'Abata
- Shaubak Castle (Montreal)
- Qasr Bshir (a Roman Castellum)
- Pella (Modern Tabaqat Fahil)
- Qasr Al-Mushatta
- Abila City (Modern Qweilbeh)
- Gadara (Modern Um Qeis or Qays)
- Jerash Archaeological City (Ancient Meeting Place of East and West)
- Mujib Nature Reserve
- The Jordanian ḥarrah

== Kuwait ==
=== World Heritage Sites ===
There are no World Heritage Sites in Kuwait.

=== Tentative list ===
- Abraj Al-Kuwait
- Boubyan Island and Mubarak Al-Kabeer Marine Reserve (MAKMR)
- Failaka Island: A Palimpsest of Human Civilizations
- Sa'ad and Sae'ed Area in Failaka Island
- Sheikh Abdullah Al-Jabir Palace

== Lebanon ==
=== World Heritage Sites ===
- Anjar
- Baalbek
- Byblos
- Ouadi Qadisha (the Holy Valley) and the Forest of the Cedars of God (Horsh Arz el-Rab)
- Rachid Karami International Fair-Tripoli
- Tyre
- Mount Amil Castles: Qalaat Al Chakif (Beaufoert castle), Qalaat Tibnin (Toron castle), Qalaat Chakra (Dubieh castle), Qalaat Deir kifa (Maron Castle) and Qalaat Chama
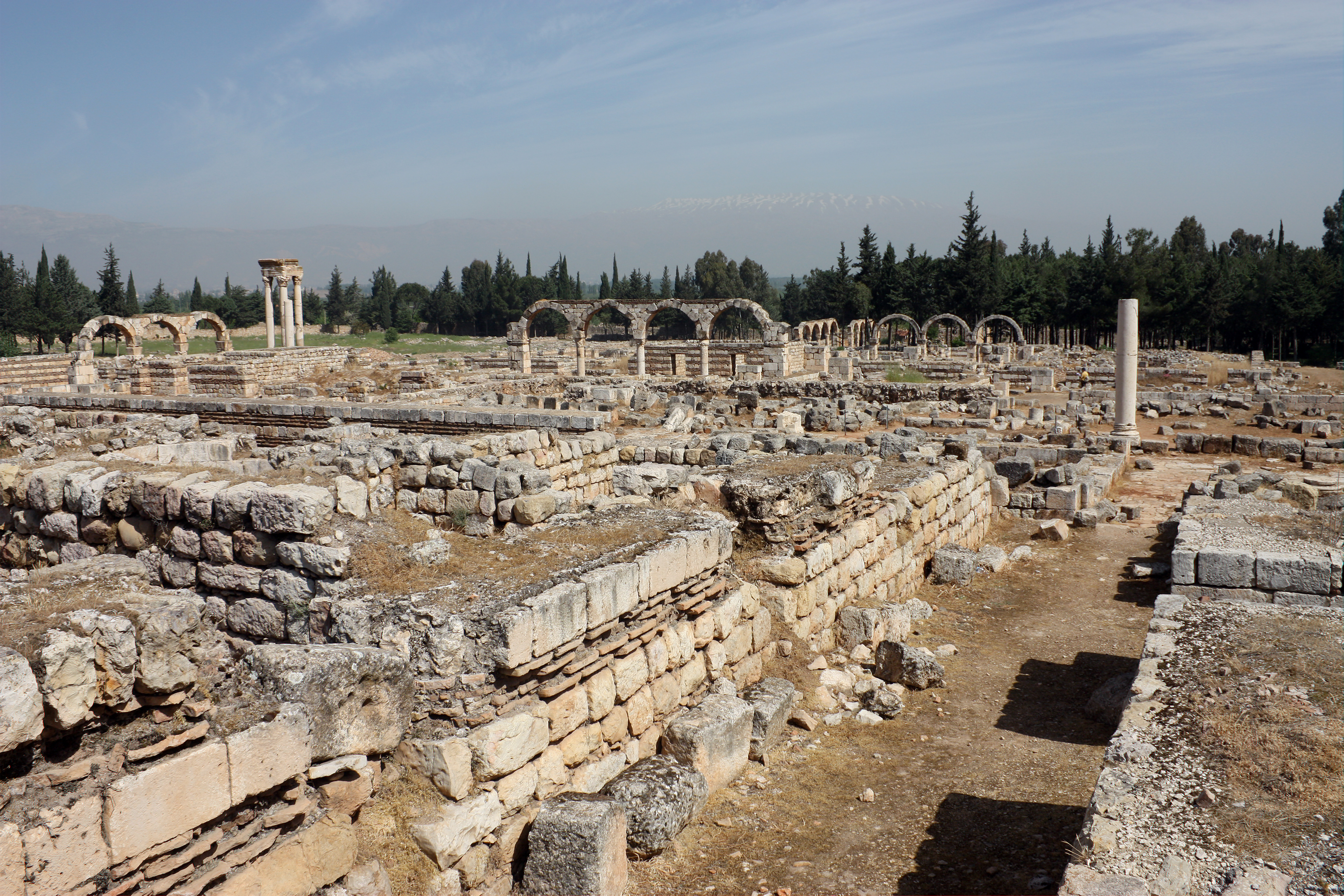
Anjar

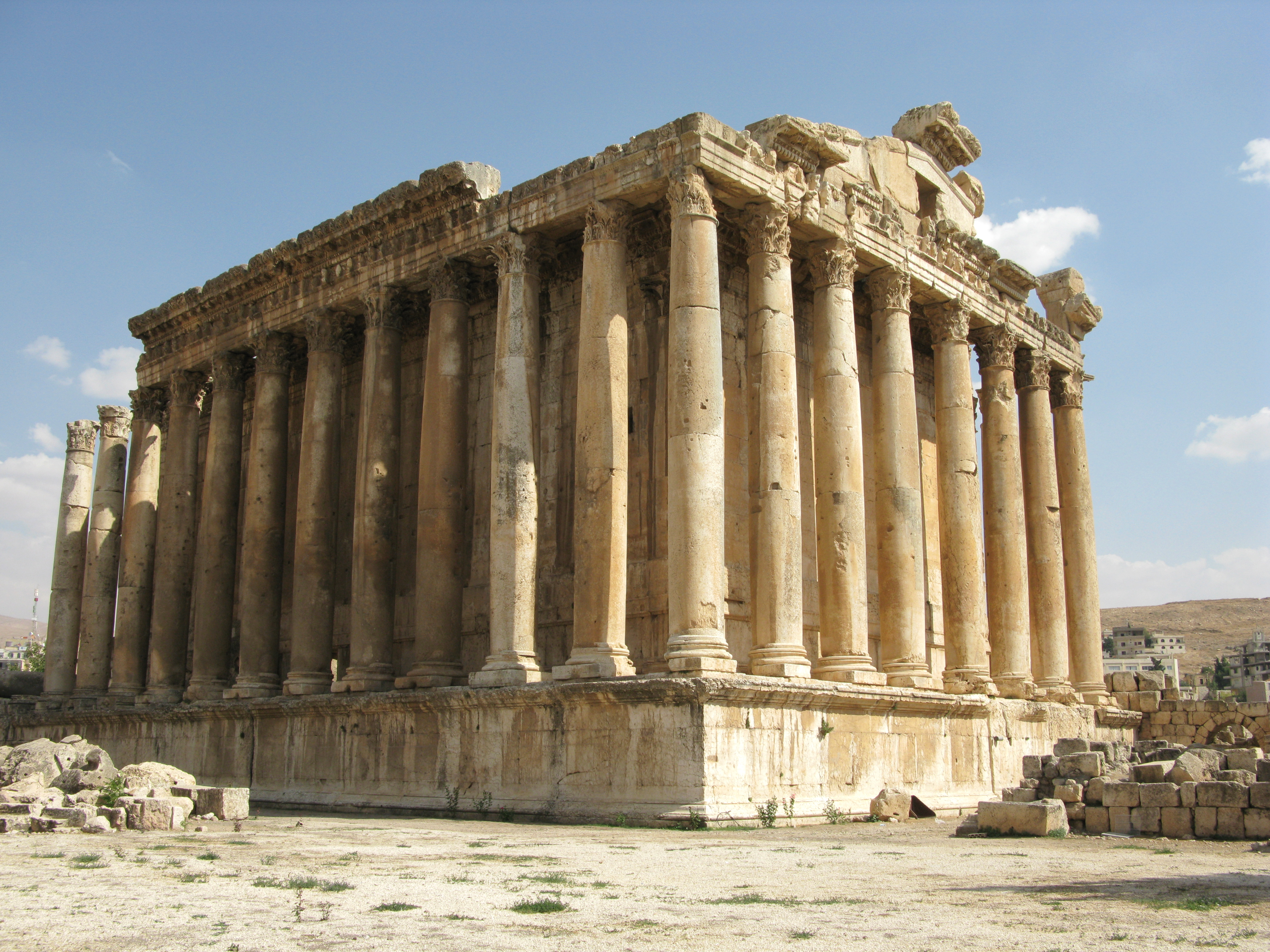
Baalbek

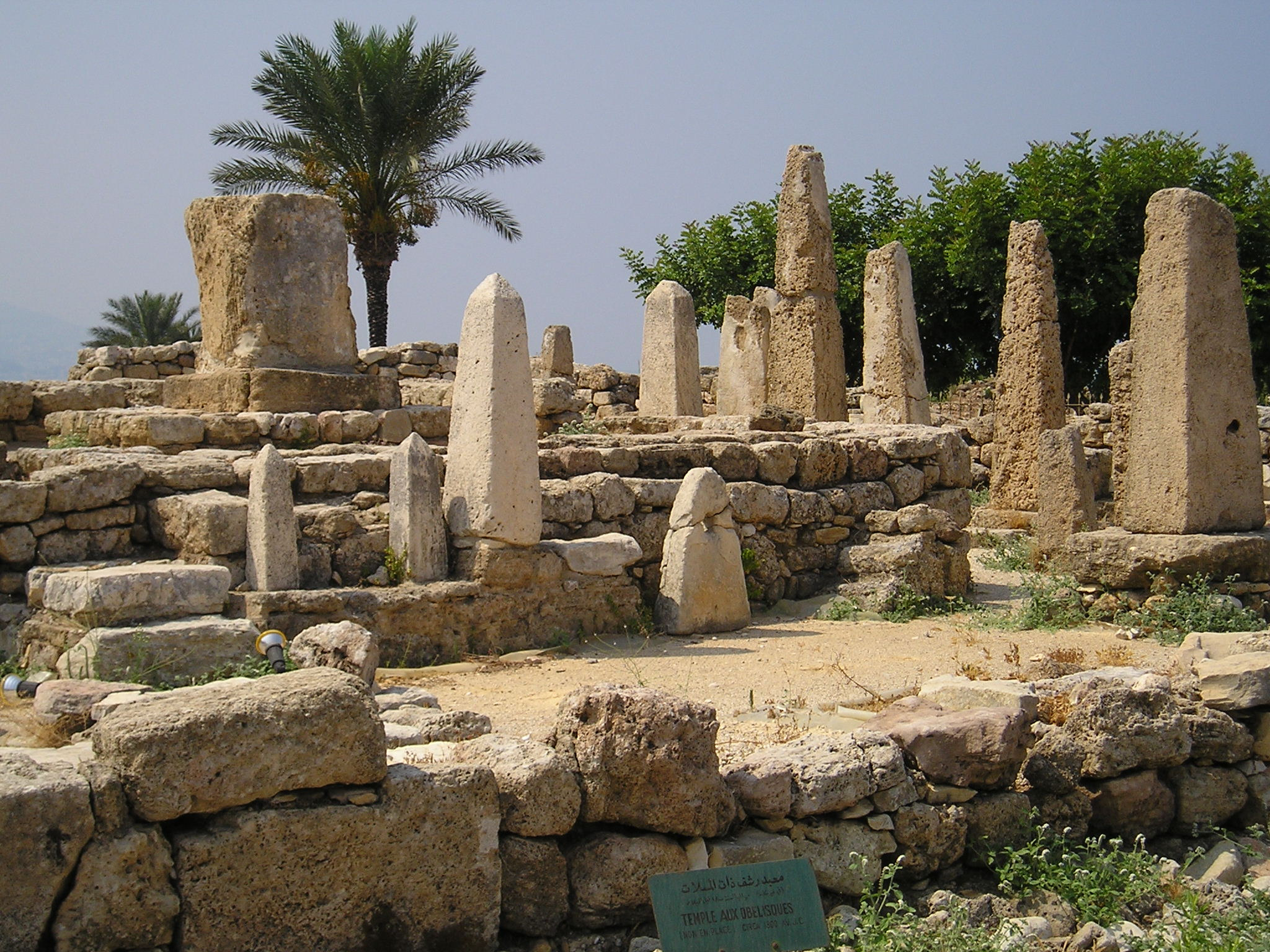
Byblos

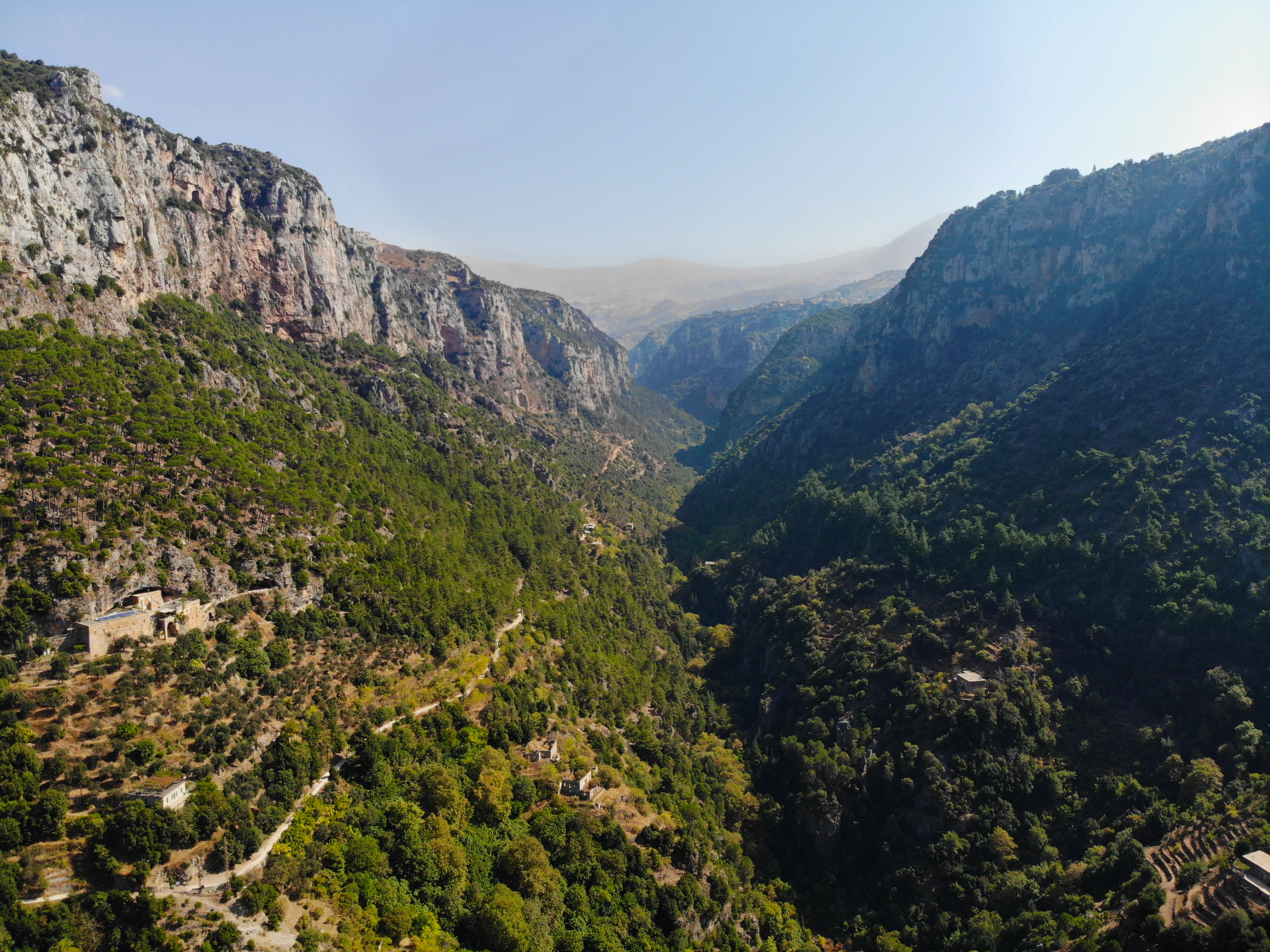
Kadisha Valley

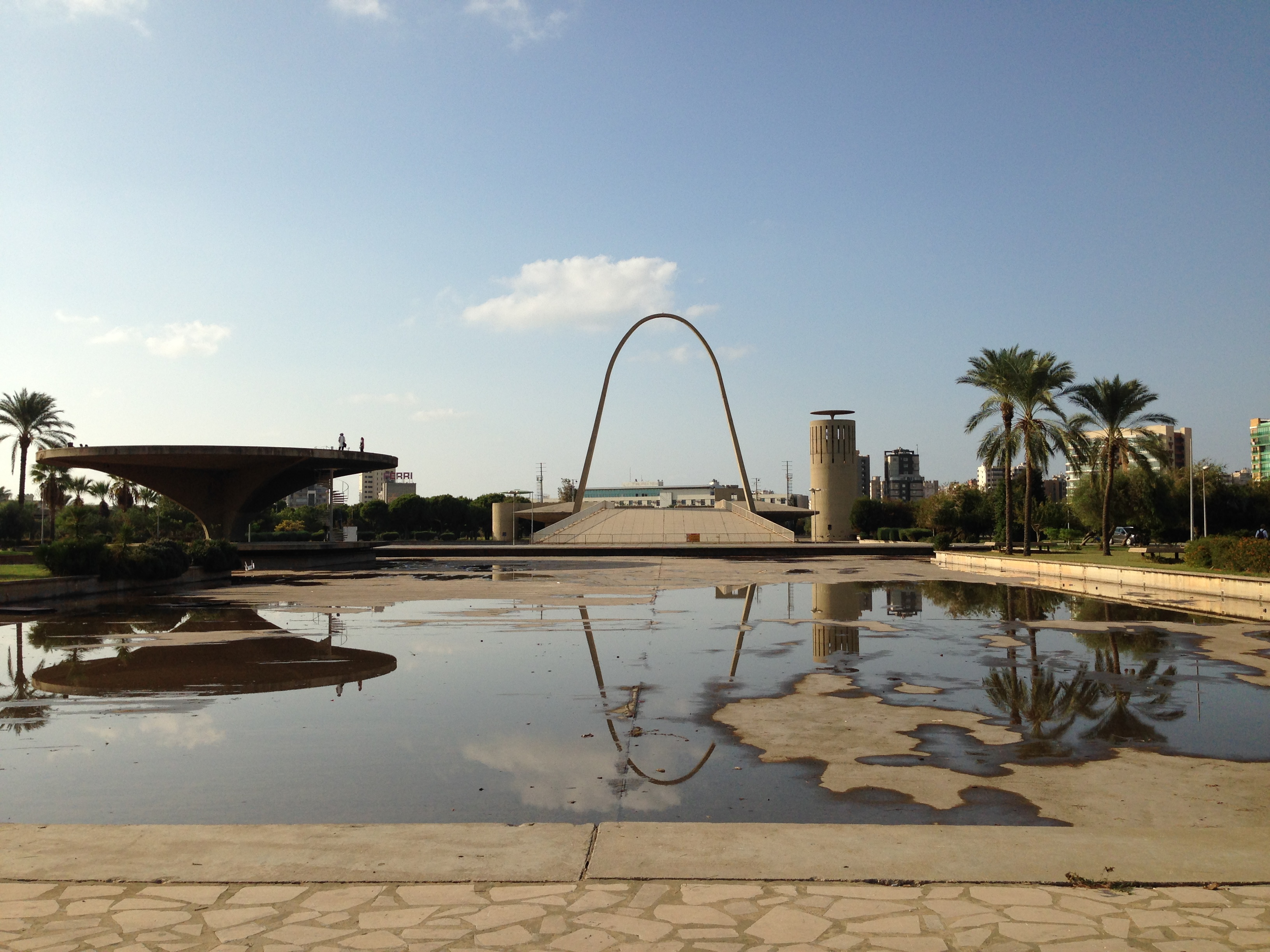
Rachid Karami International Fair-Tripoli

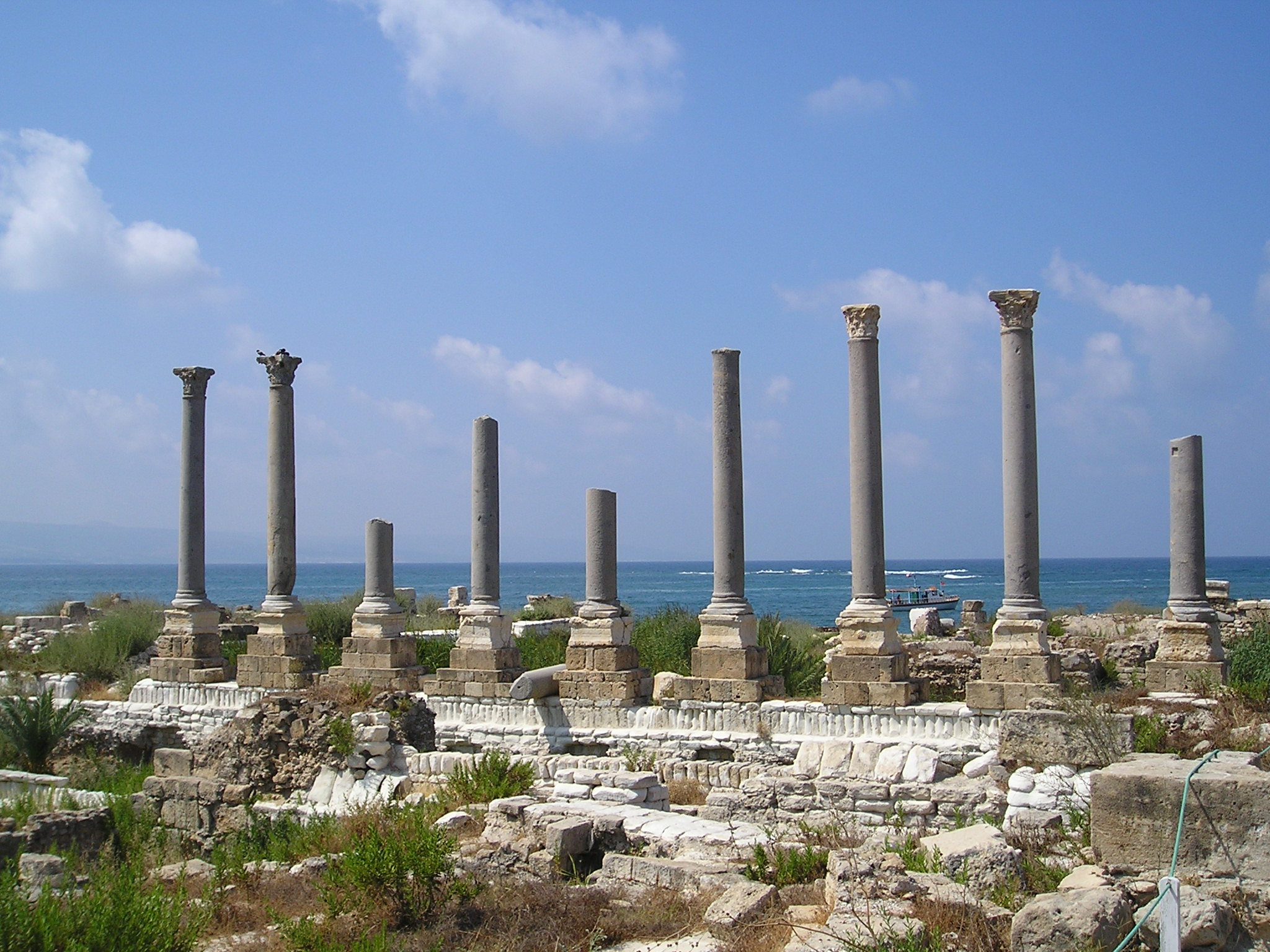
Tyre

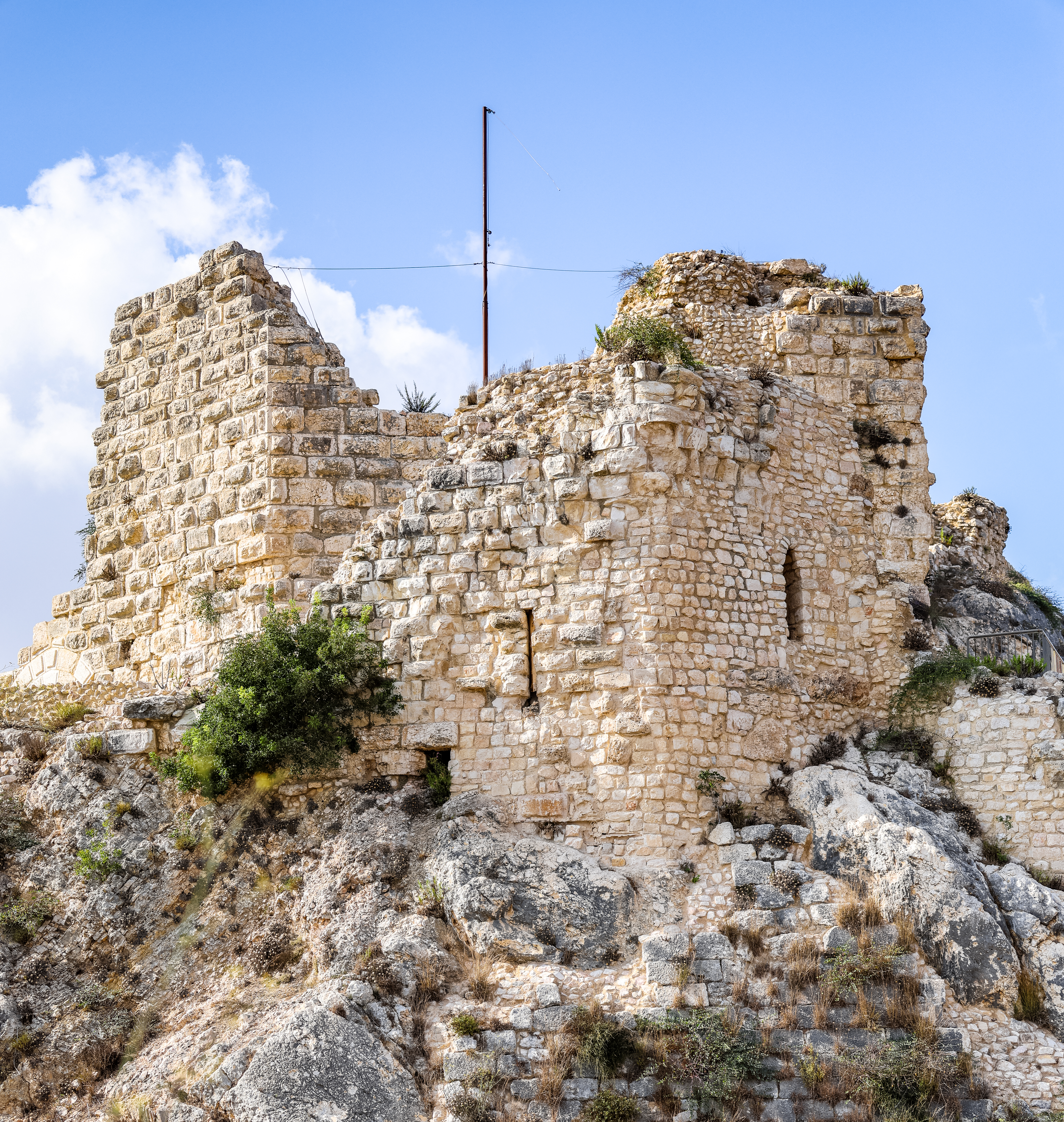
Mount Amil Castles

=== Tentative list ===
- Historic Centre of Saida
- Ras al-Qalaat promontory / Ras Al Natour promontory / Ras el-Mlelih Promontory
- Sacred Mount Hermon and its associated cultural monuments
- The Archaeological Site of Nahr el-Kalb
- Temple of Eshmun
- The Ancient City of Tripoli
- The Historic Centre of the City of Batroun
- Historical monuments and natural sites in the village of Menjez

== Libya ==
=== World Heritage Sites ===
- Rock-Art Sites of Tadrart Acacus
- Archaeological Site of Cyrene
- Old Town of Ghadamès
- Archaeological Site of Leptis Magna
- Archaeological Site of Sabratha
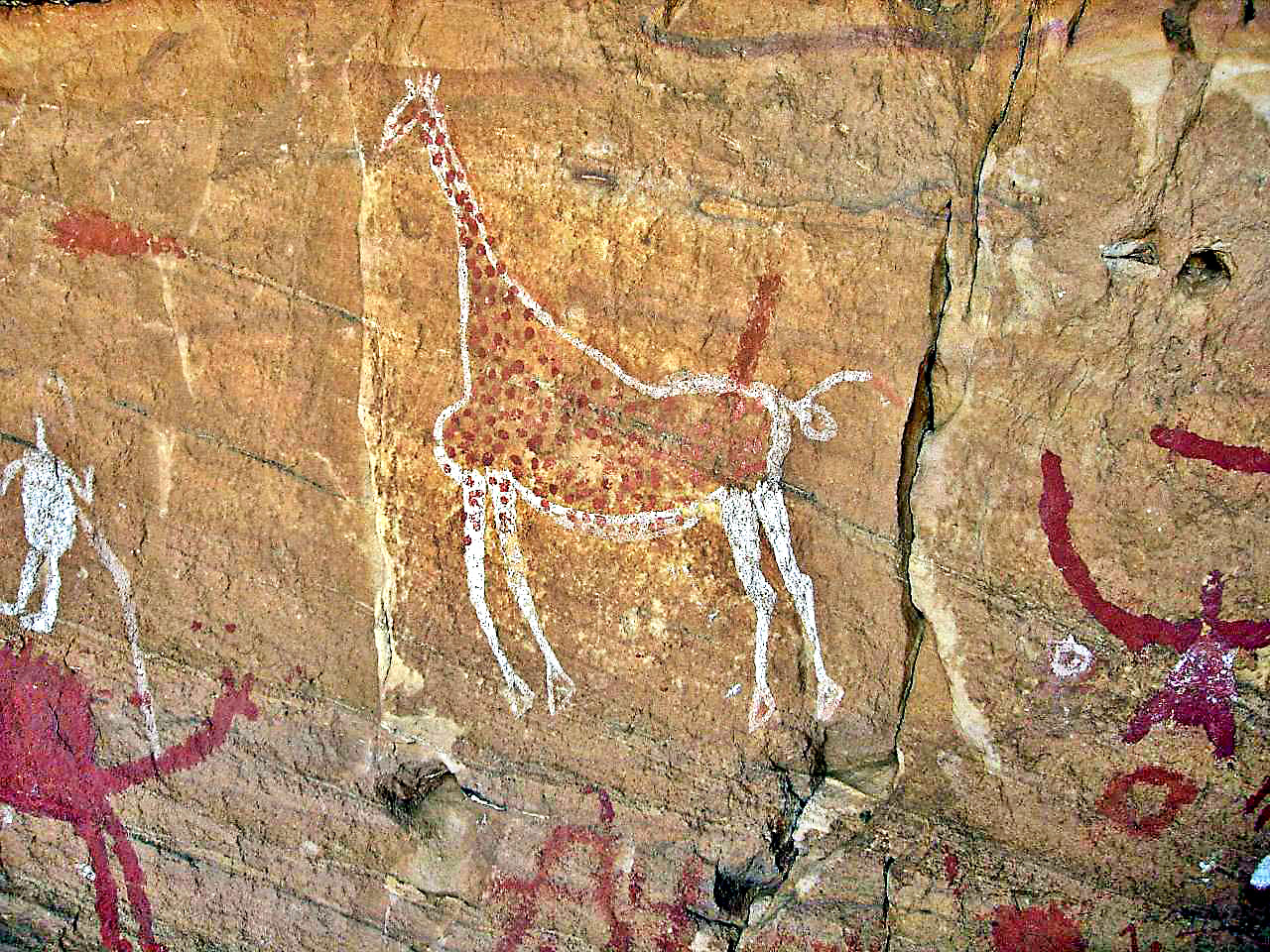
Acacus Mountains

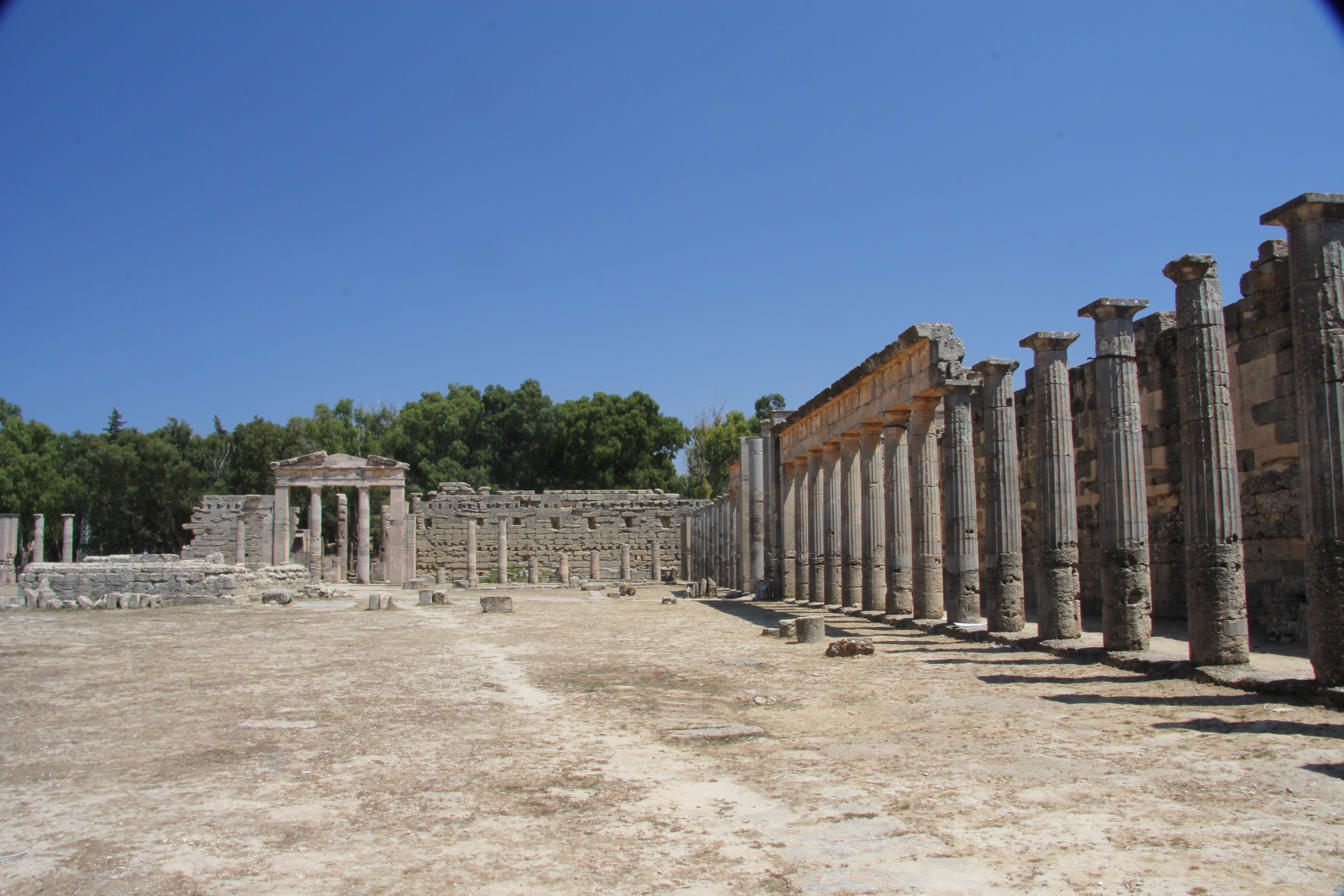
Cyrene

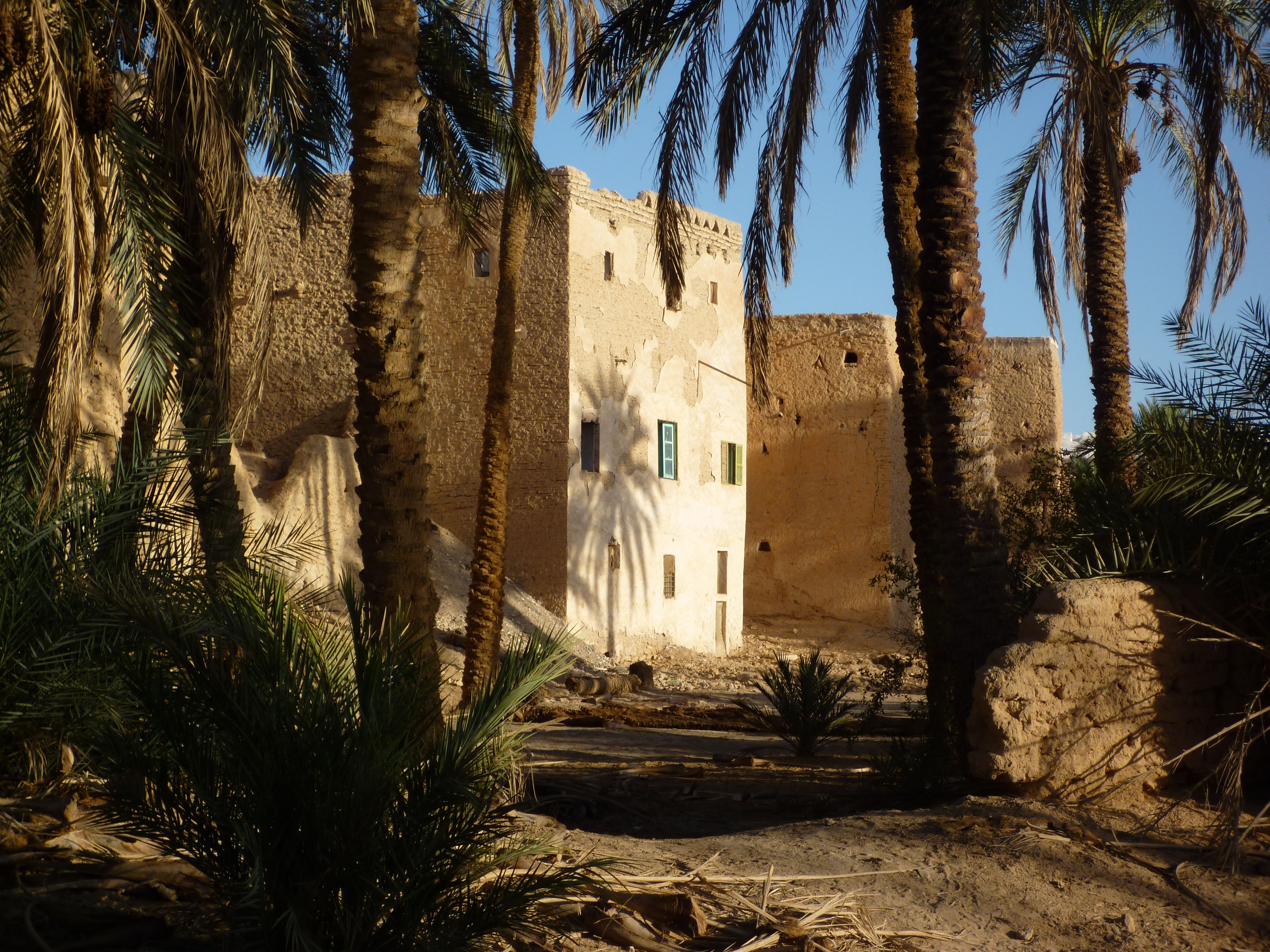
Ghadamès

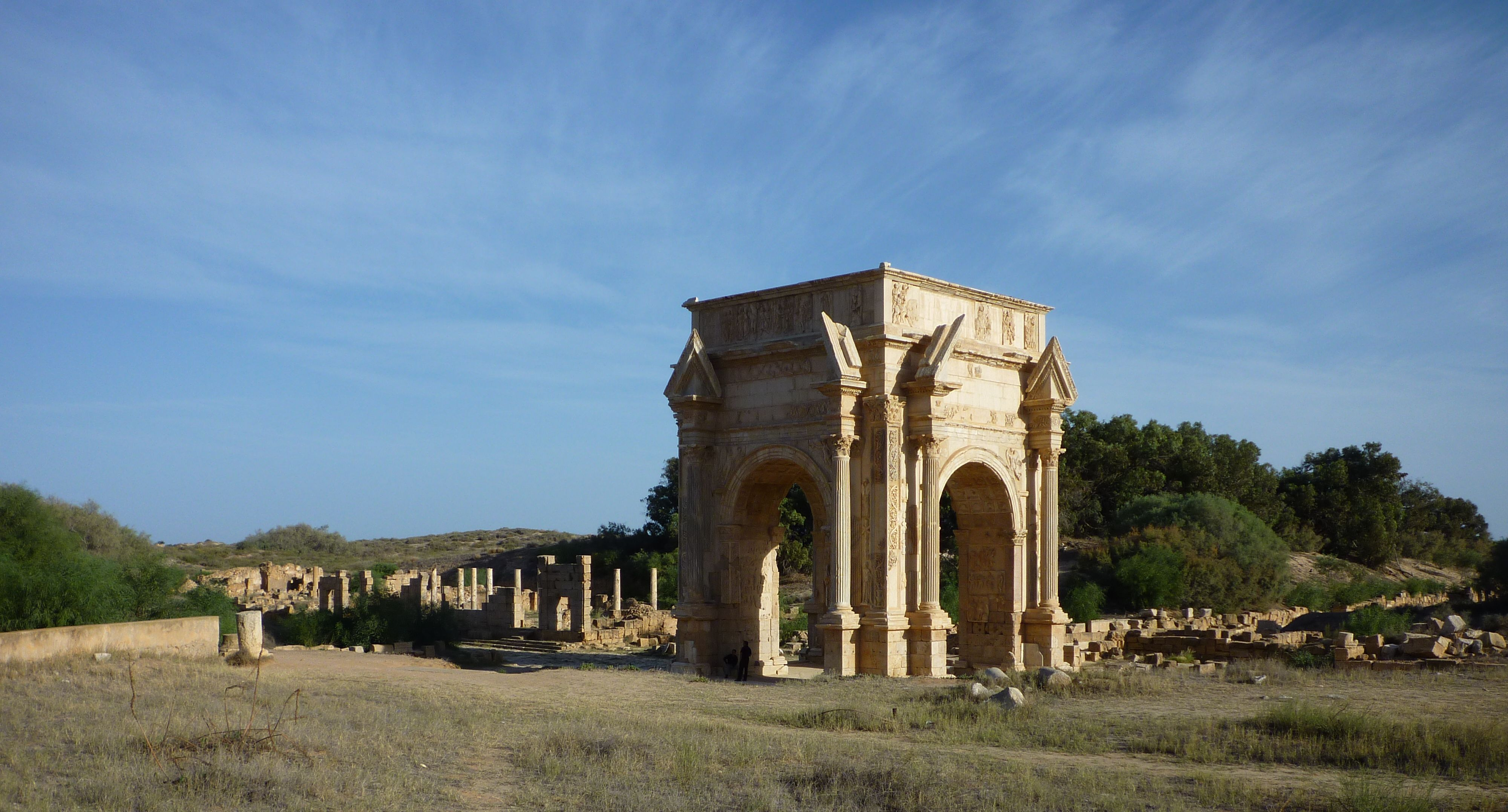
Leptis Magna

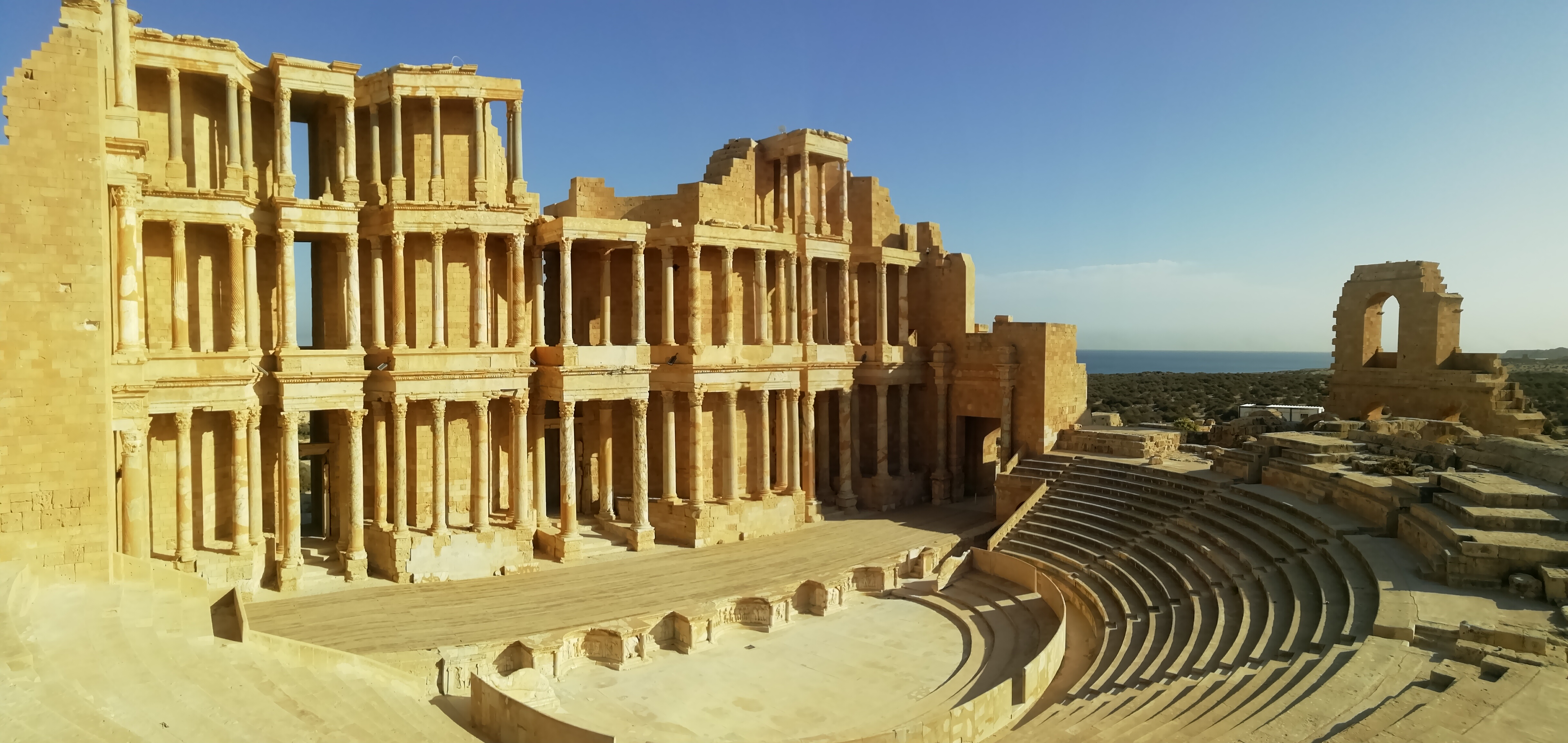
Sabratha

=== Tentative list ===
- Archaeological site of Ghirza
- Haua Fteah Cave
- The Archaeological Site of Ptolemais

== Mauritania ==
=== World Heritage Sites ===
- Ancient Ksour of Ouadane, Chinguetti, Tichitt and Oualata
- Banc d'Arguin National Park
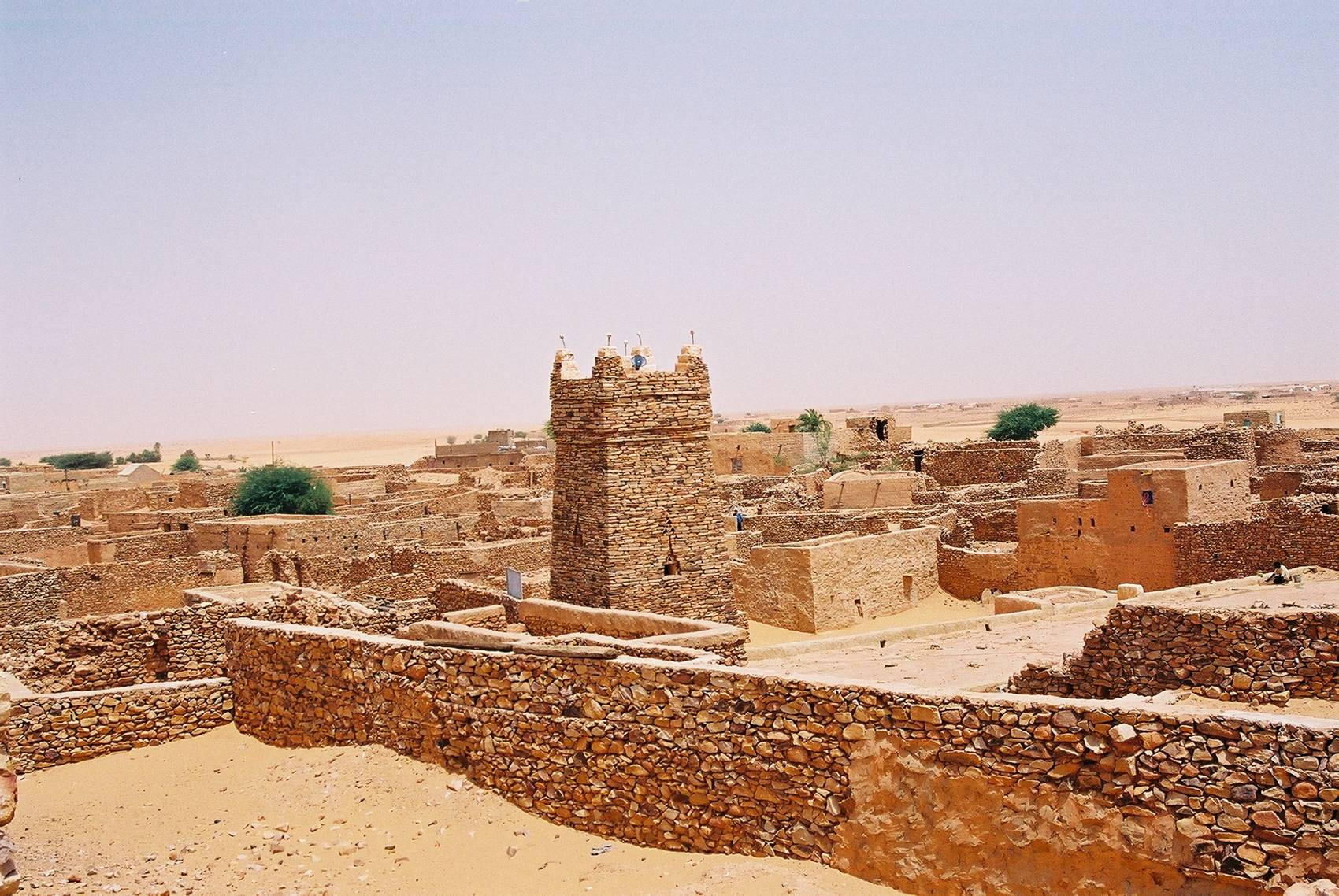
Ancient Ksour of Ouadane, Chinguetti, Tichitt and Oualata

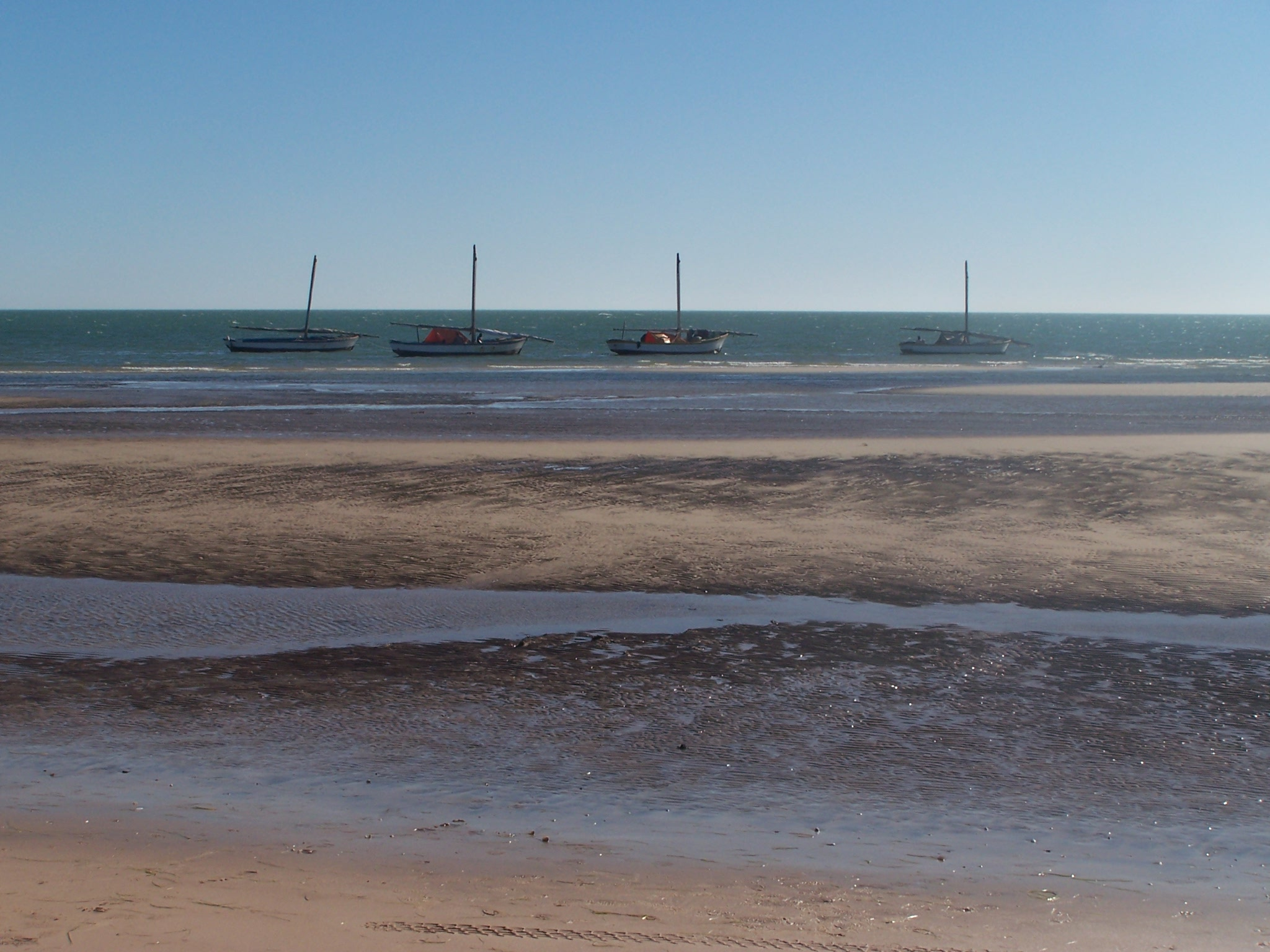
Banc d'Arguin National Park

=== Tentative list ===
- Azougui Cultural Landscape
- Kumbi Saleh Archaeological Site
- Tegdaoust Archaeological Site

== Morocco ==
=== World Heritage Sites ===
- Medina of Fez
- Medina of Marrakesh
- Ksar of Ait-Ben-Haddou
- Historic City of Meknes
- Archaeological site of Volubilis
- Medina of Tétouan (formerly known as Titawin)
- Medina of Essaouira (formerly Mogador)
- Portuguese City of Mazagan (El Jadida)
- Rabat, Modern Capital and Historic City: a Shared Heritage
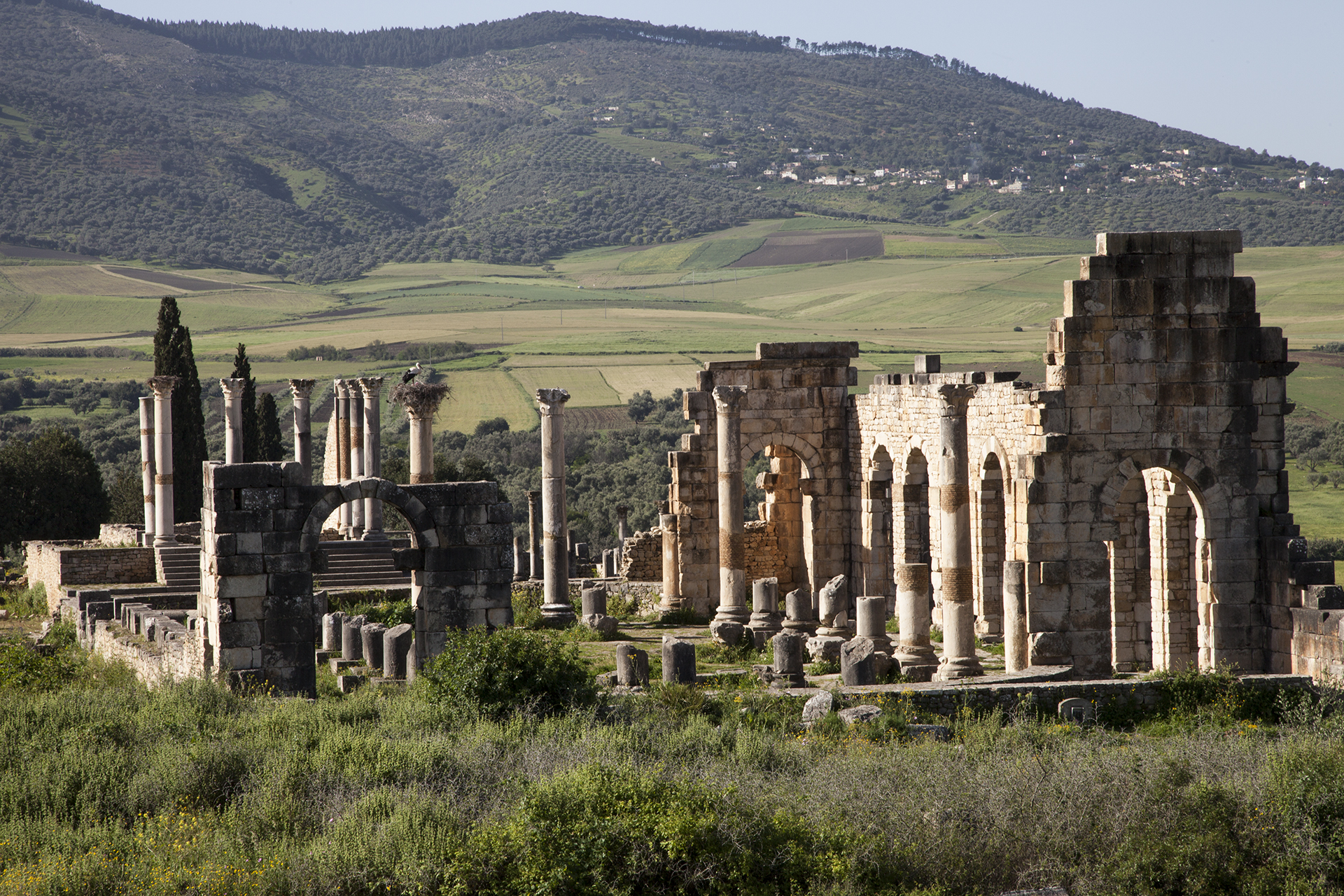
Volubilis

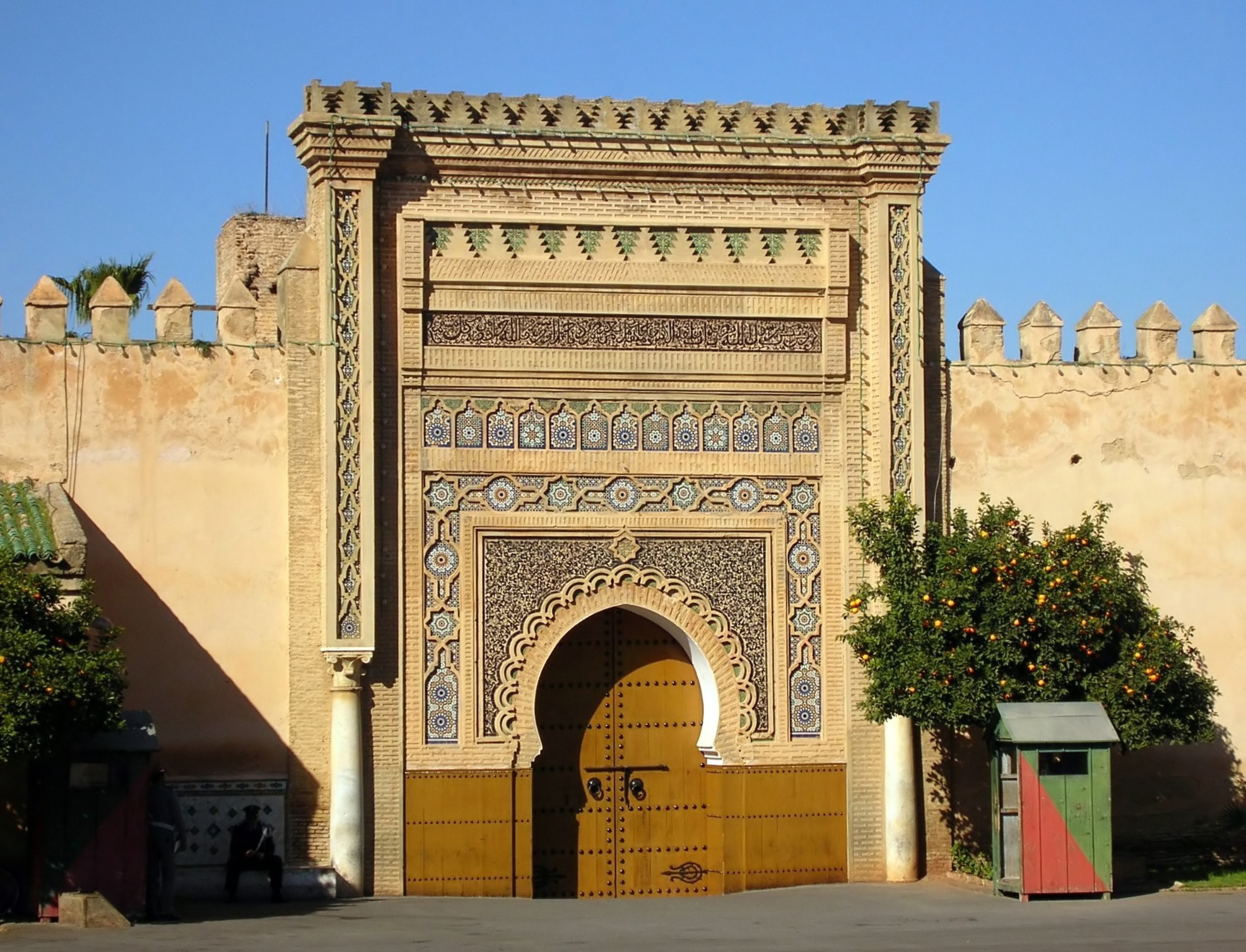
Meknes

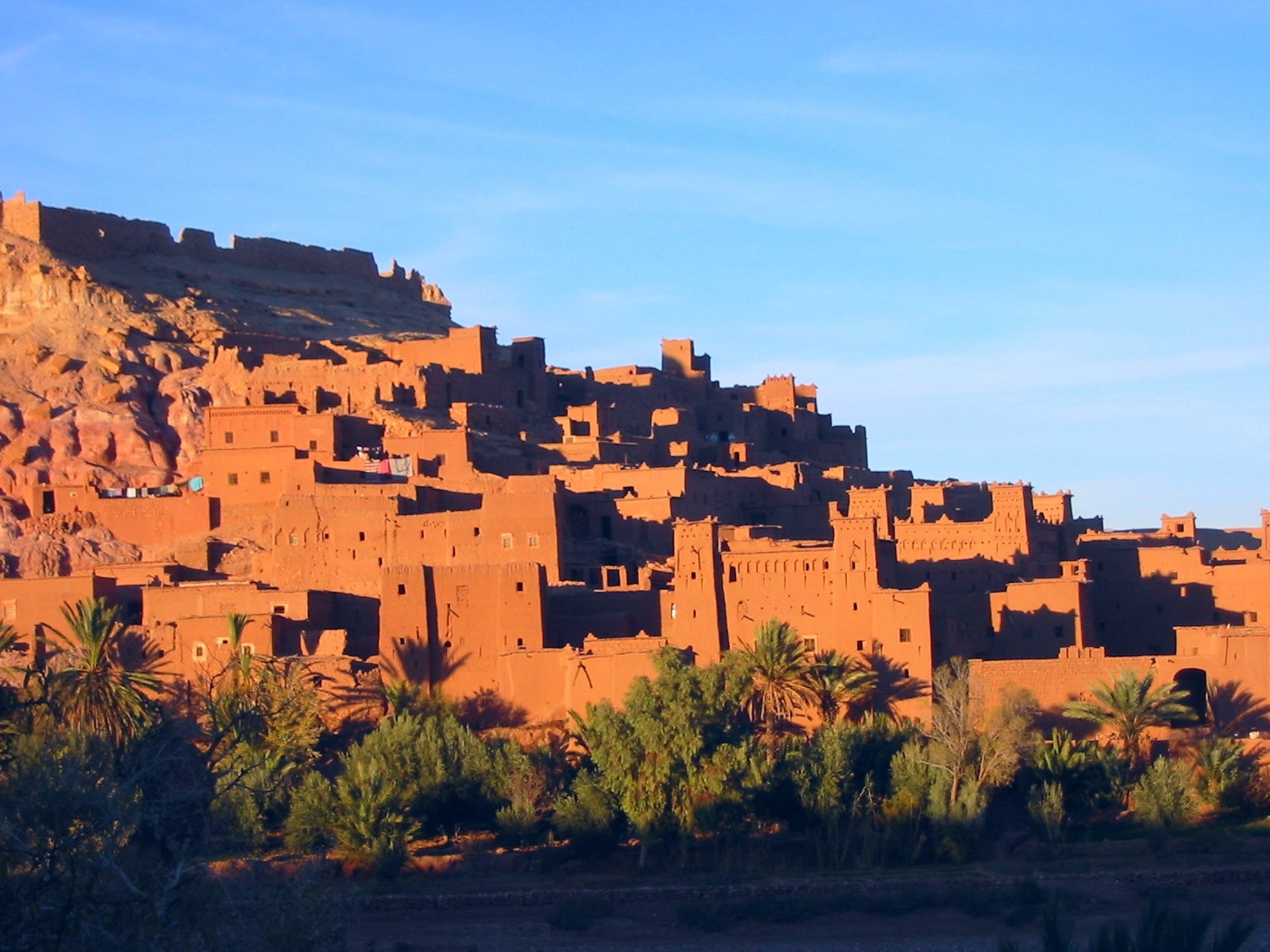
Aït Benhaddou

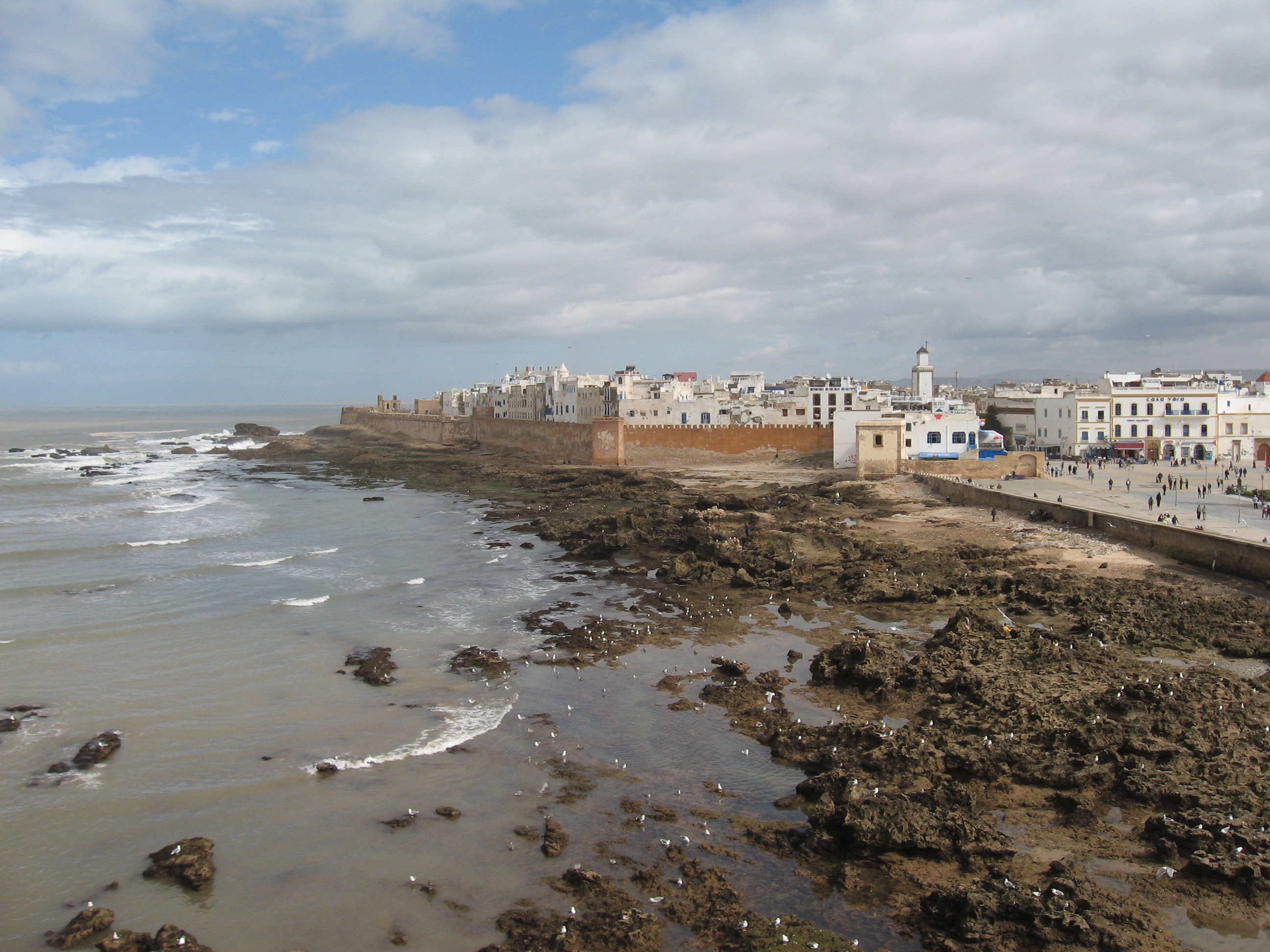
Essaouira

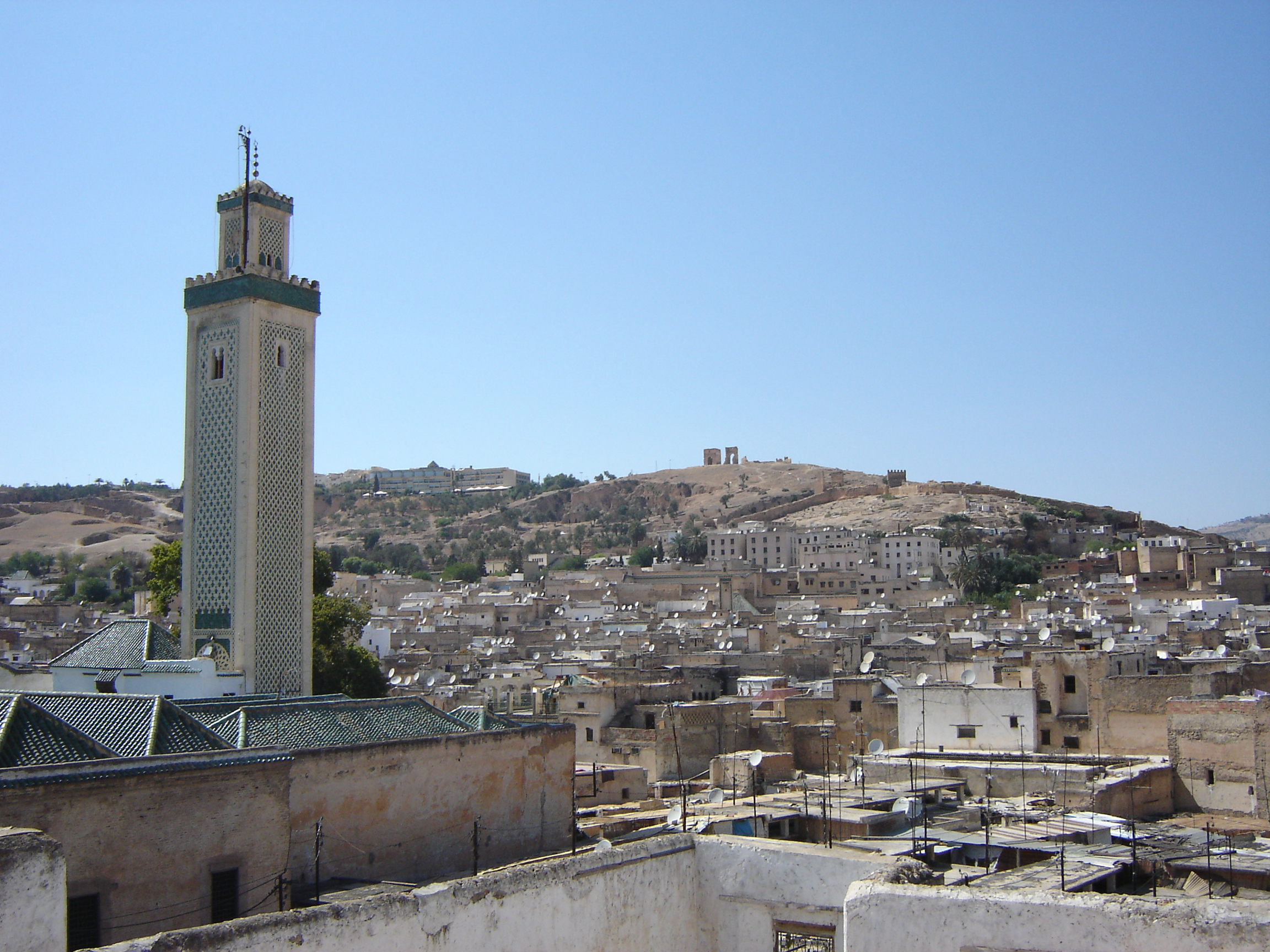
Fes

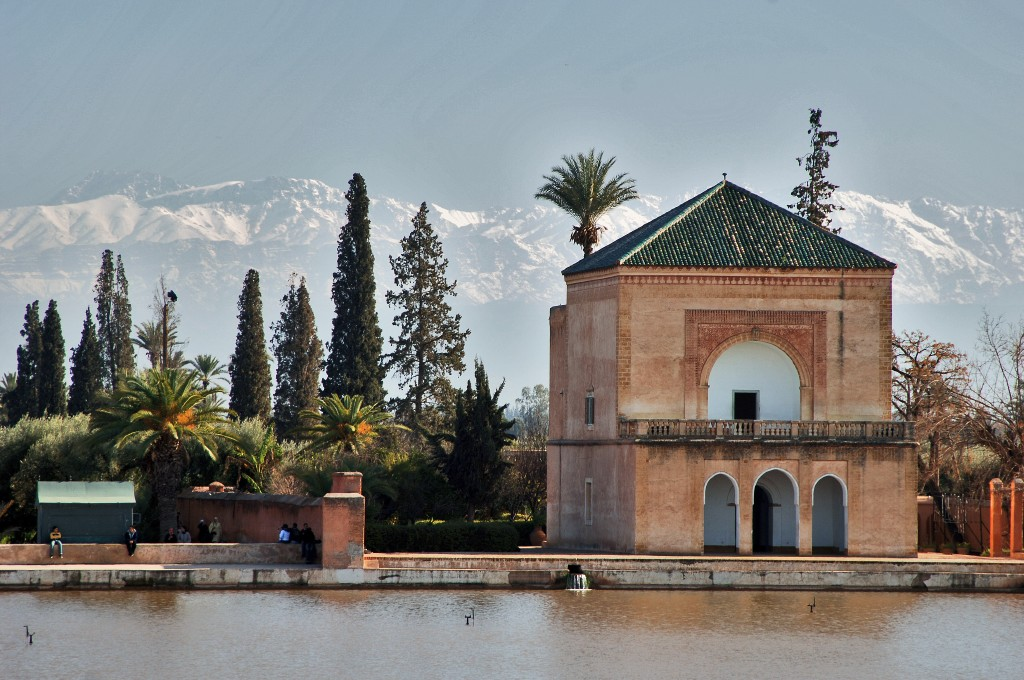
Marrakesh

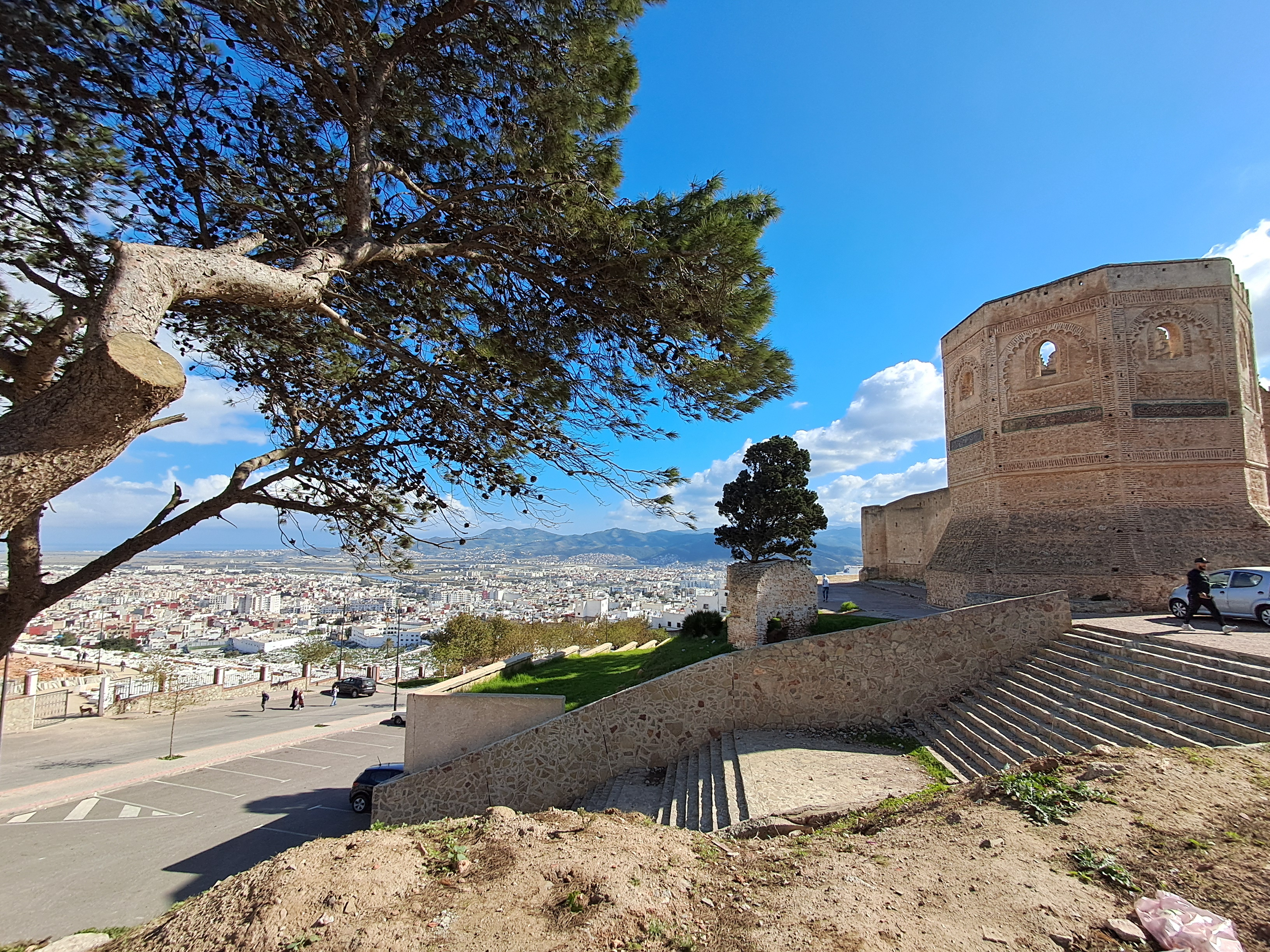
Tétouan

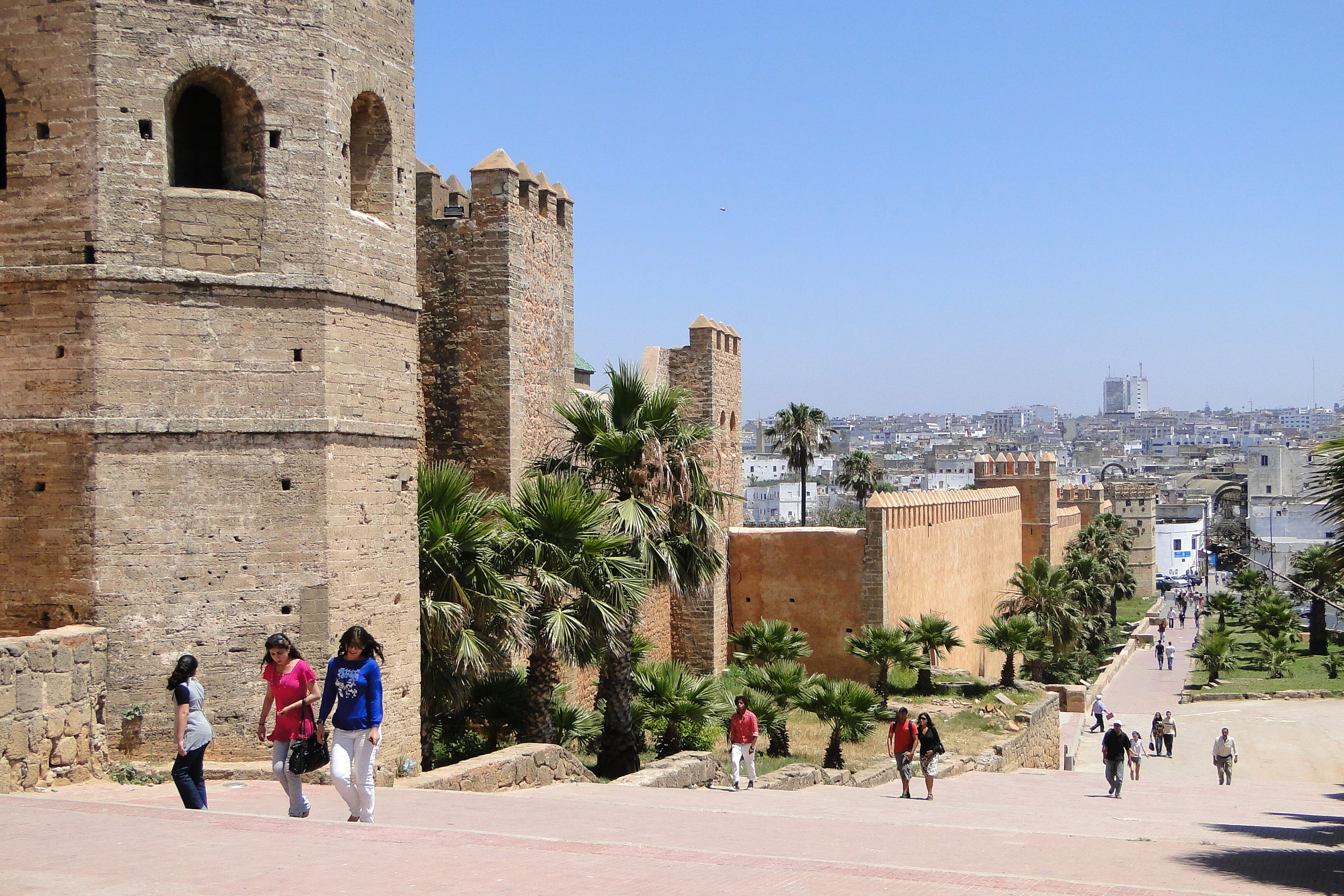
Rabat

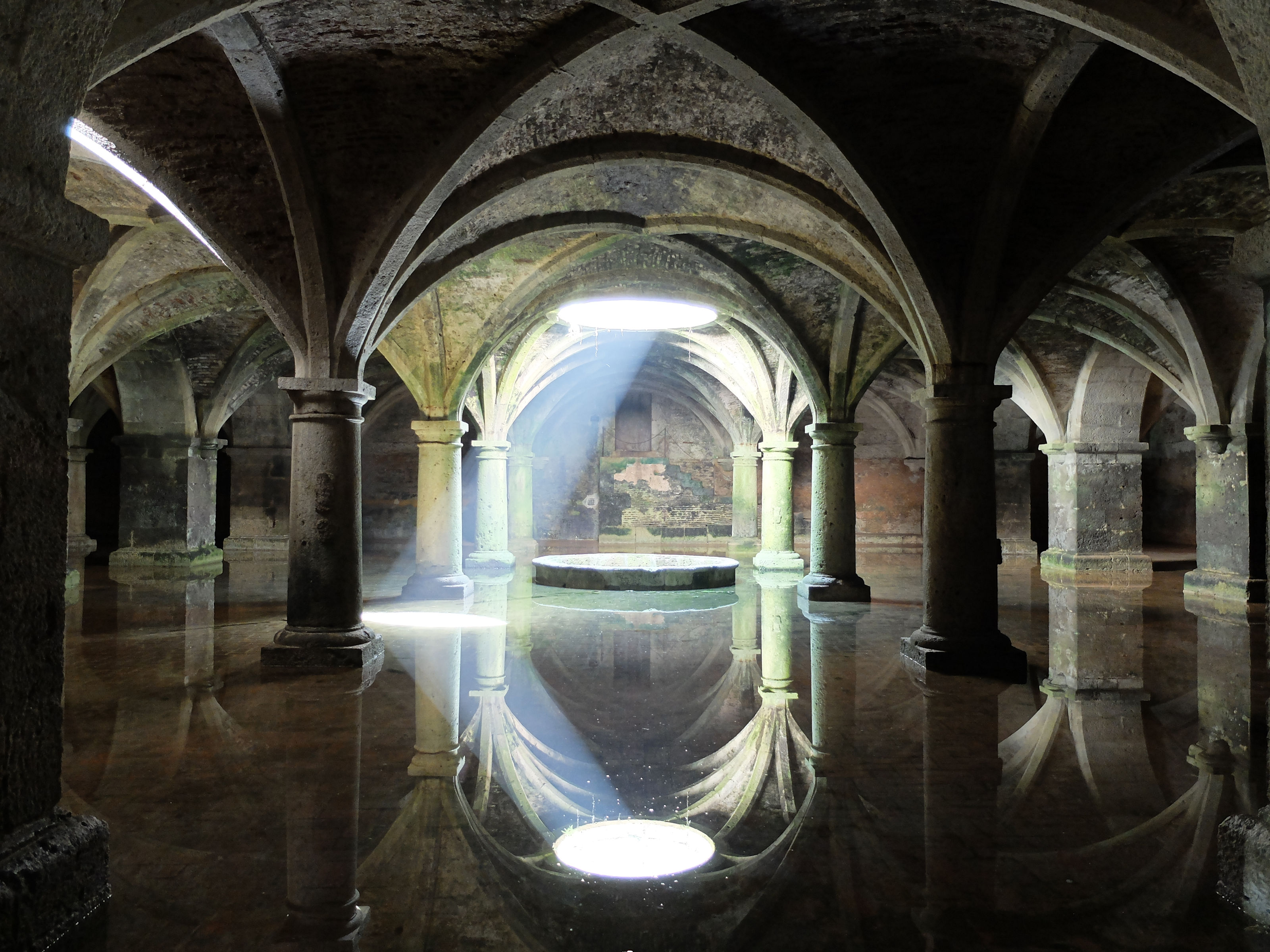
Portuguese cistern in El Jadida

=== Tentative list ===
- Moulay Idriss Zerhoun
- Taza and the Great Mosque
- Tinmal Mosque
- The city of Lixus
- El Gour
- Taforalt Cave
- Talassemtane National Park
- The area of the dragon tree ajgal
- Khnifiss Lagoon
- Dakhla National Park
- Figuig Oasis
- Casablanca, a twentieth-century city, crossroads of influences
- String of oases at Tighmert, pre-Saharan region of Wad Noun
- The Historic Centre of Tétouan

== Oman ==
=== World Heritage Sites ===
- Archaeological Sites of Bat, Al-Khutm and Al-Ayn
- Aflaj Irrigation Systems of Oman
- Ancient City of Qalhat
- Bahla Fort
- Land of Frankincense
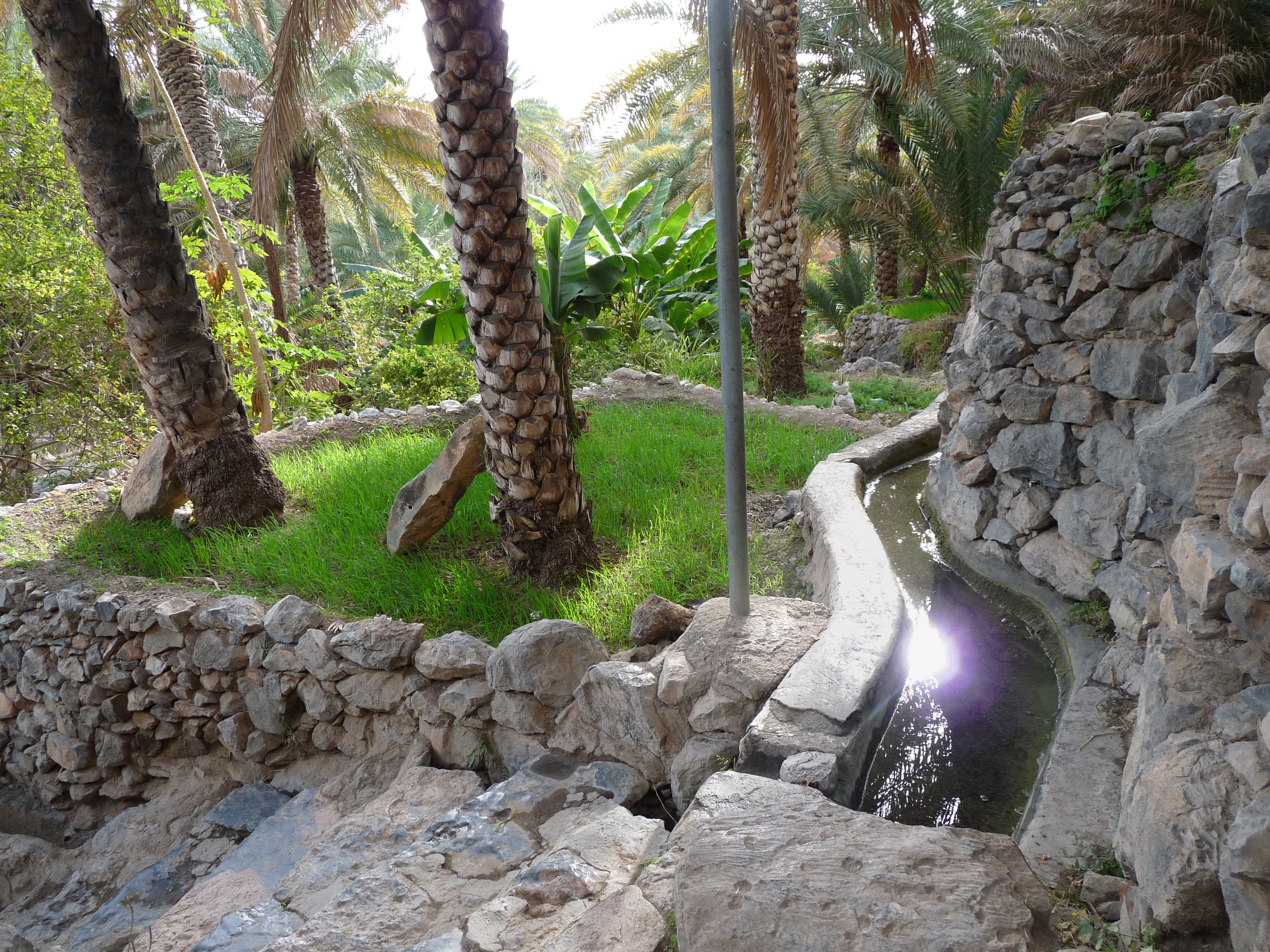
Aflaj Irrigation Systems of Oman

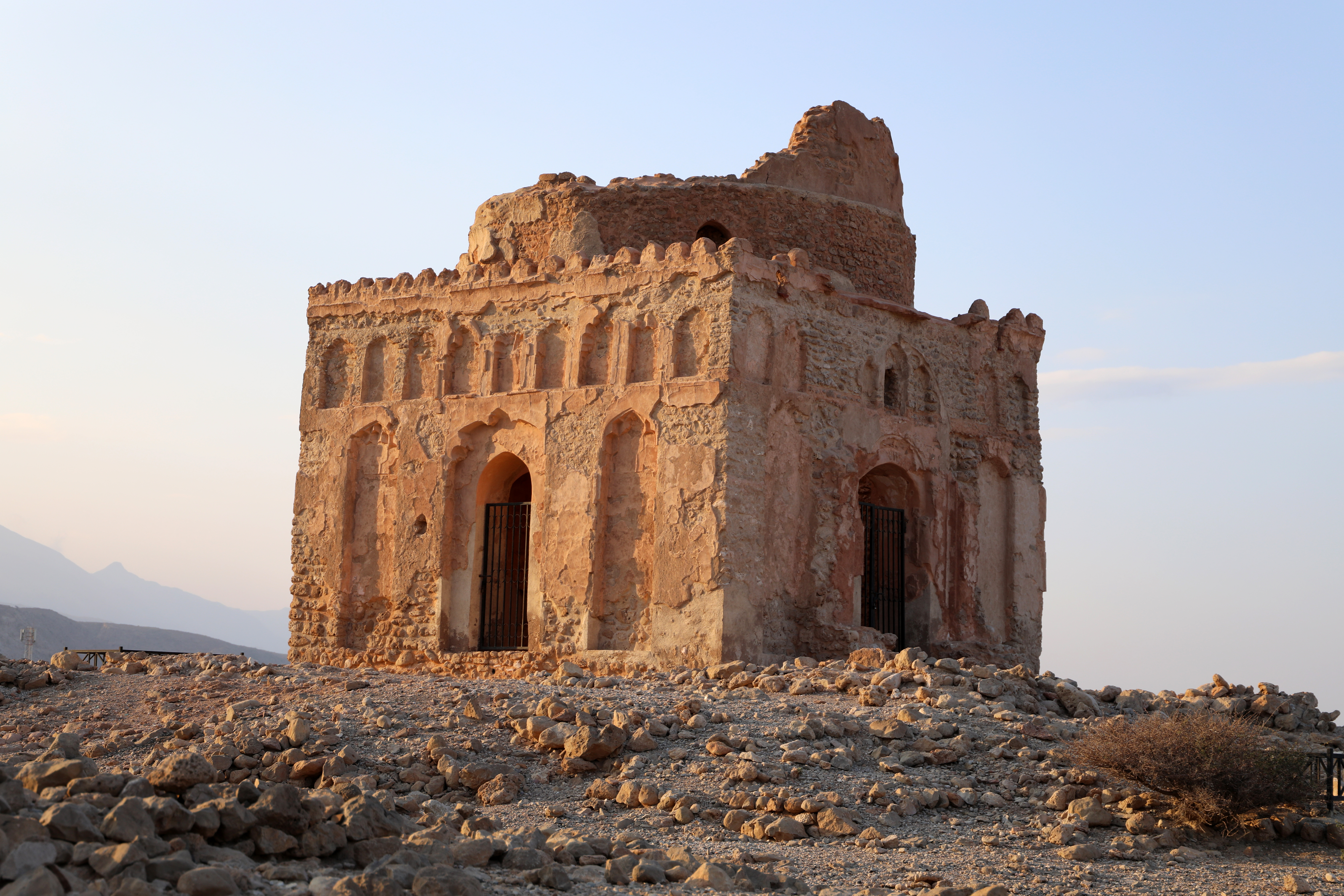
Qalhat

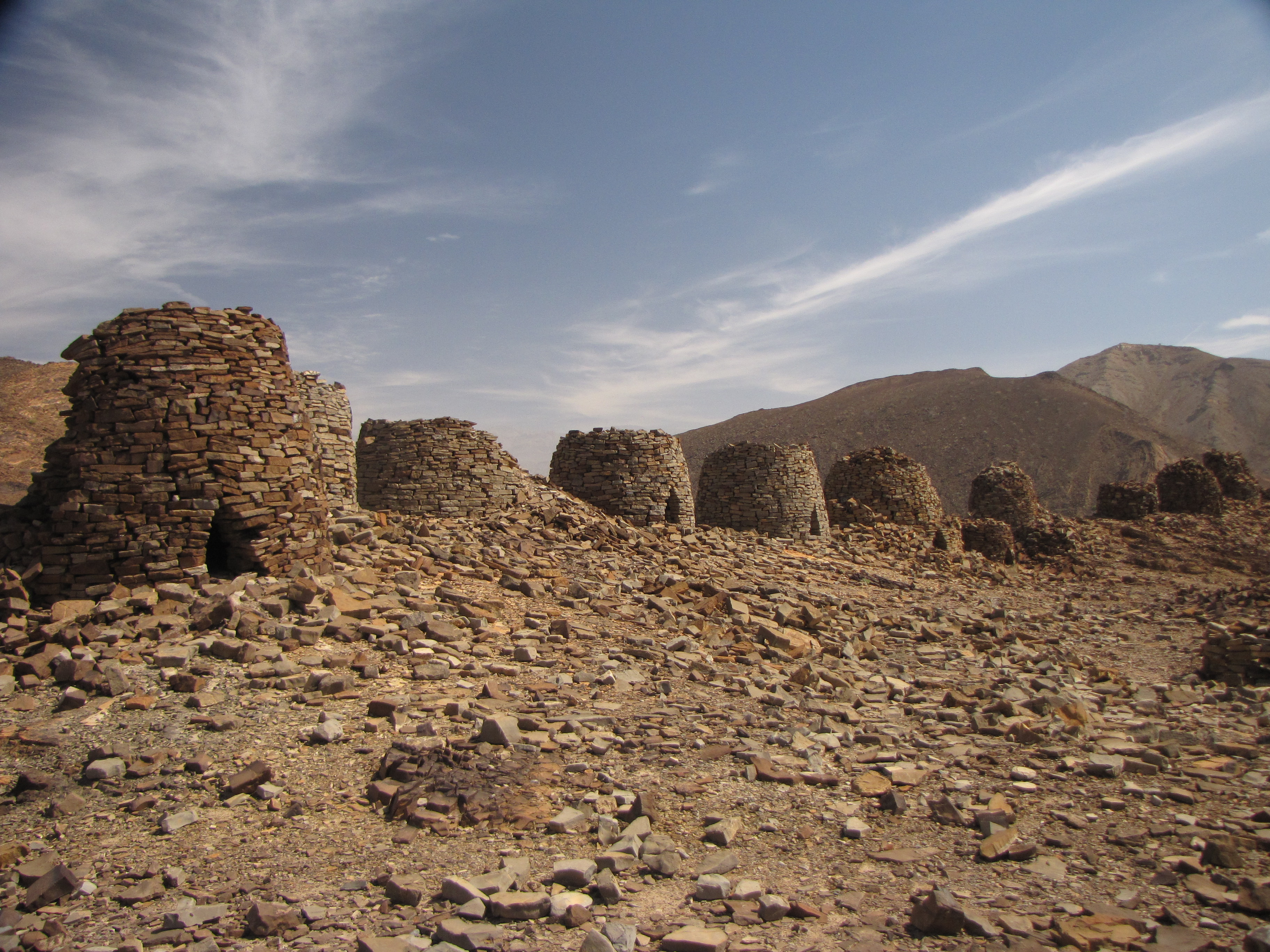
Archaeological Sites of Bat, Al-Khutm and Al-Ayn

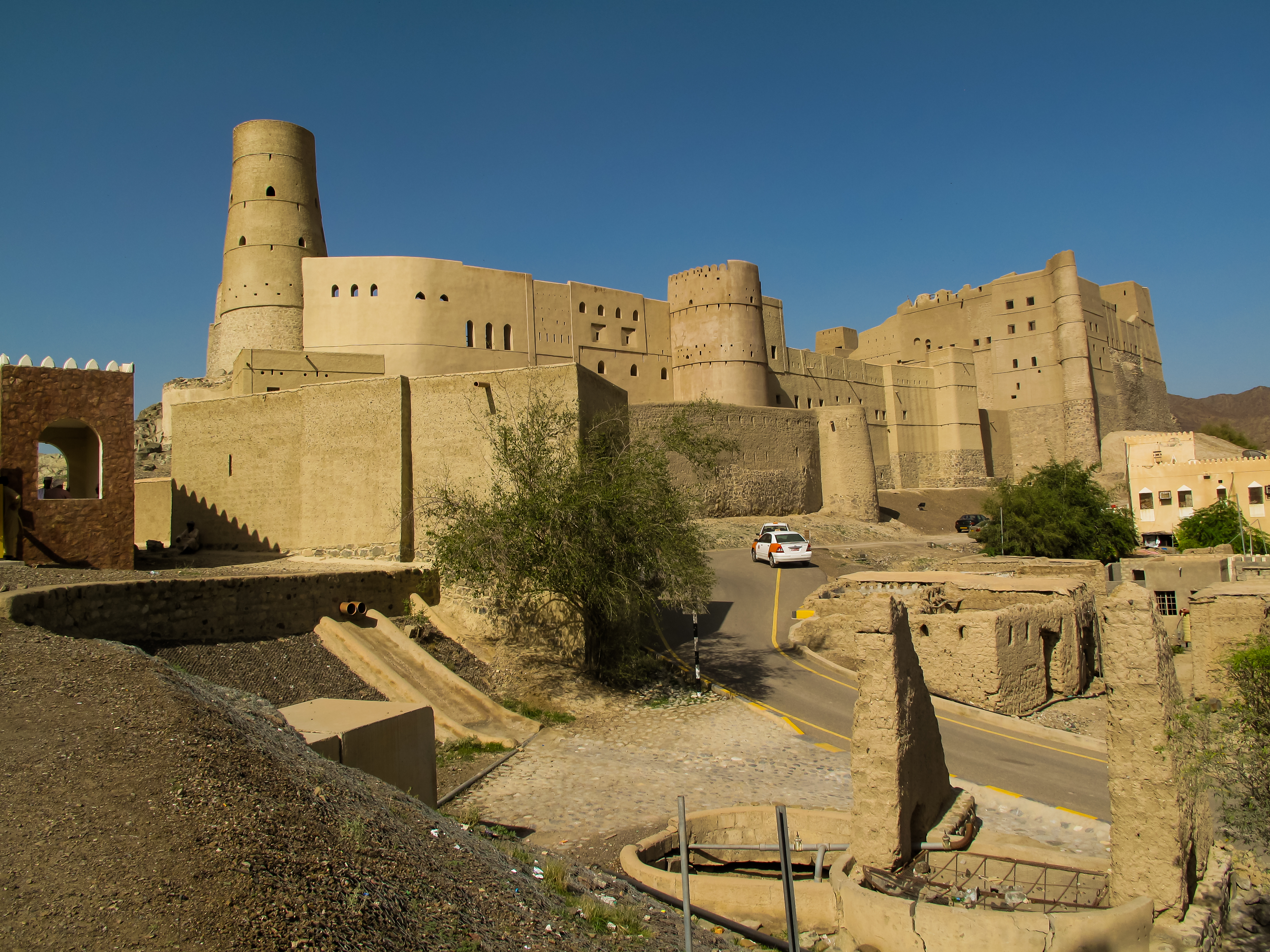
Bahla Fort

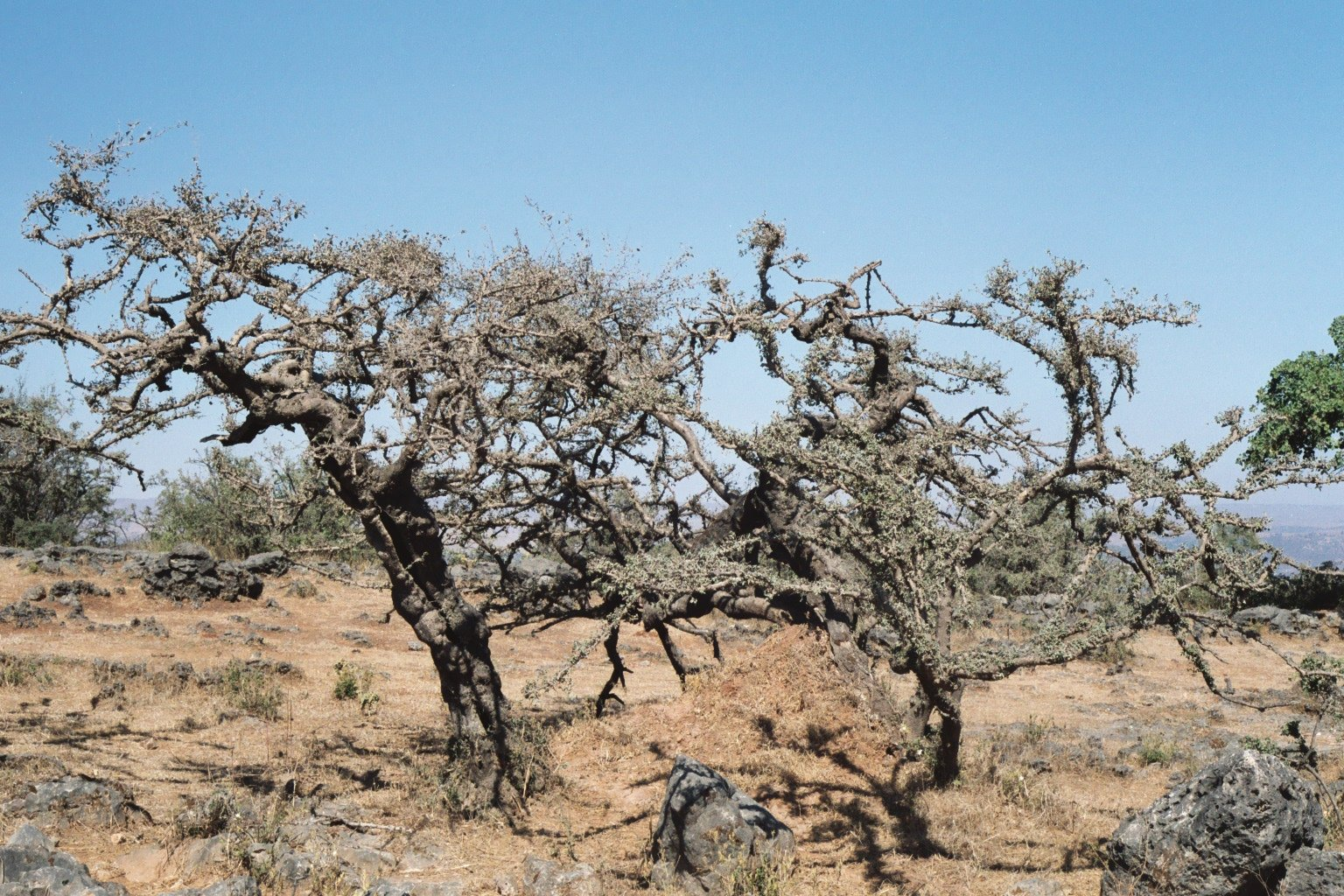
Land of Frankincense

=== Tentative list ===
- al Dimaniyyat Islands Nature Reserve
- Al Hallaniyyat Islands Proposed Nature Reserve
- Bar al Hakman Proposed Nature Reserve
- Cultural Landscape of Bisya & Salut and its Archaeological Remains
- Ras al Had Turtle Reserve and the Heritage Site of Ras al Jinz
- Smahan's Mountain Nature Reserve
- The forts of Rostaq and al-Hazm

=== Delisted site ===
- Arabian Oryx Sanctuary

== Palestine ==
=== World Heritage Sites ===
- Ancient Jericho/Tell es-Sultan
- Birthplace of Jesus: Church of the Nativity and the Pilgrimage Route, Bethlehem
- Hebron/Al-Khalil Old Town
- Old City of Jerusalem and its Walls—East Jerusalem recognized by UNESCO to be in Palestine.
- Palestine: Land of Olives and Vines – Cultural Landscape of Southern Jerusalem, Battir
- Saint Hilarion Monastery/Tell Umm Amer
- Sebastia
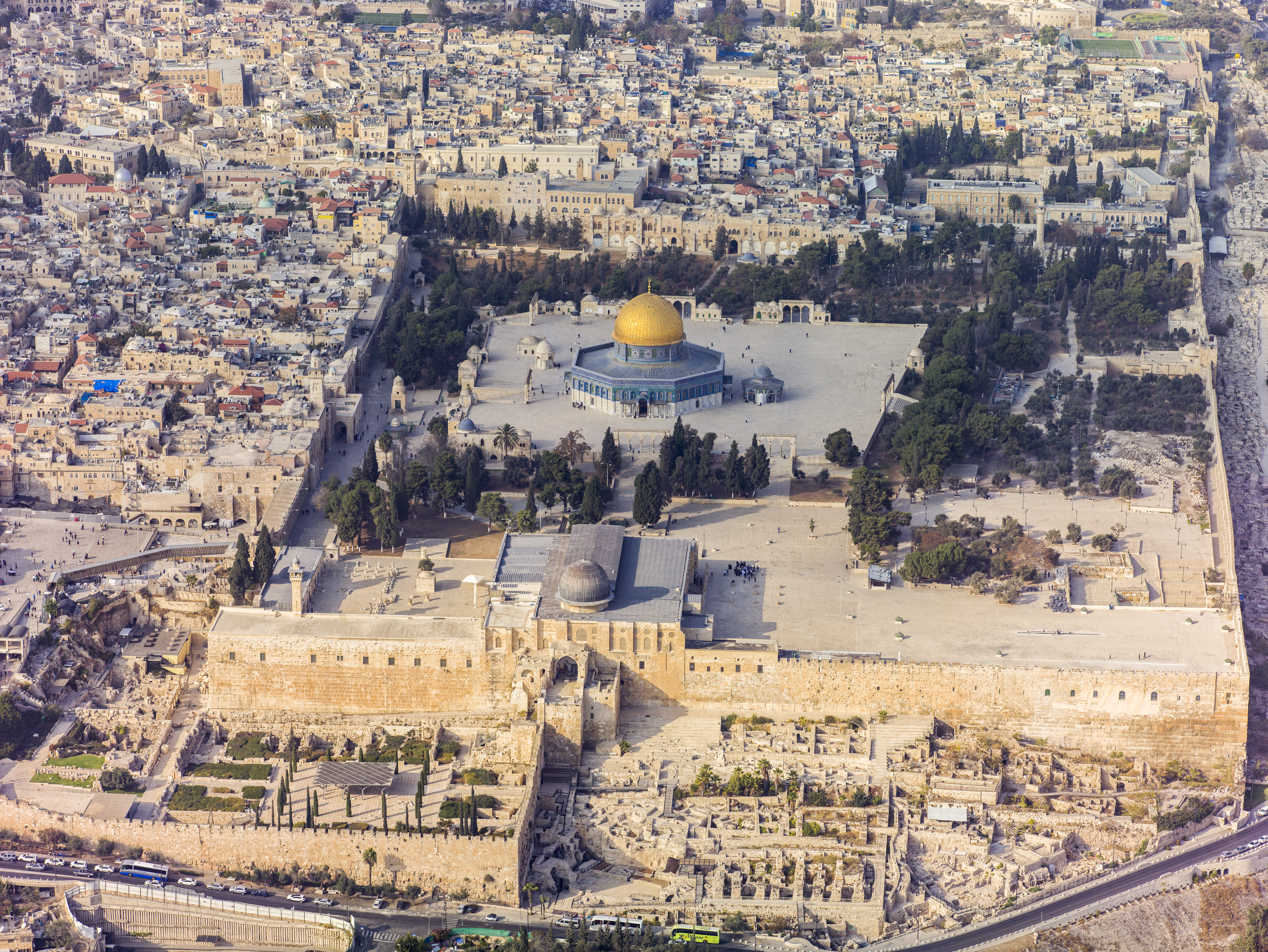
Old City of Jerusalem

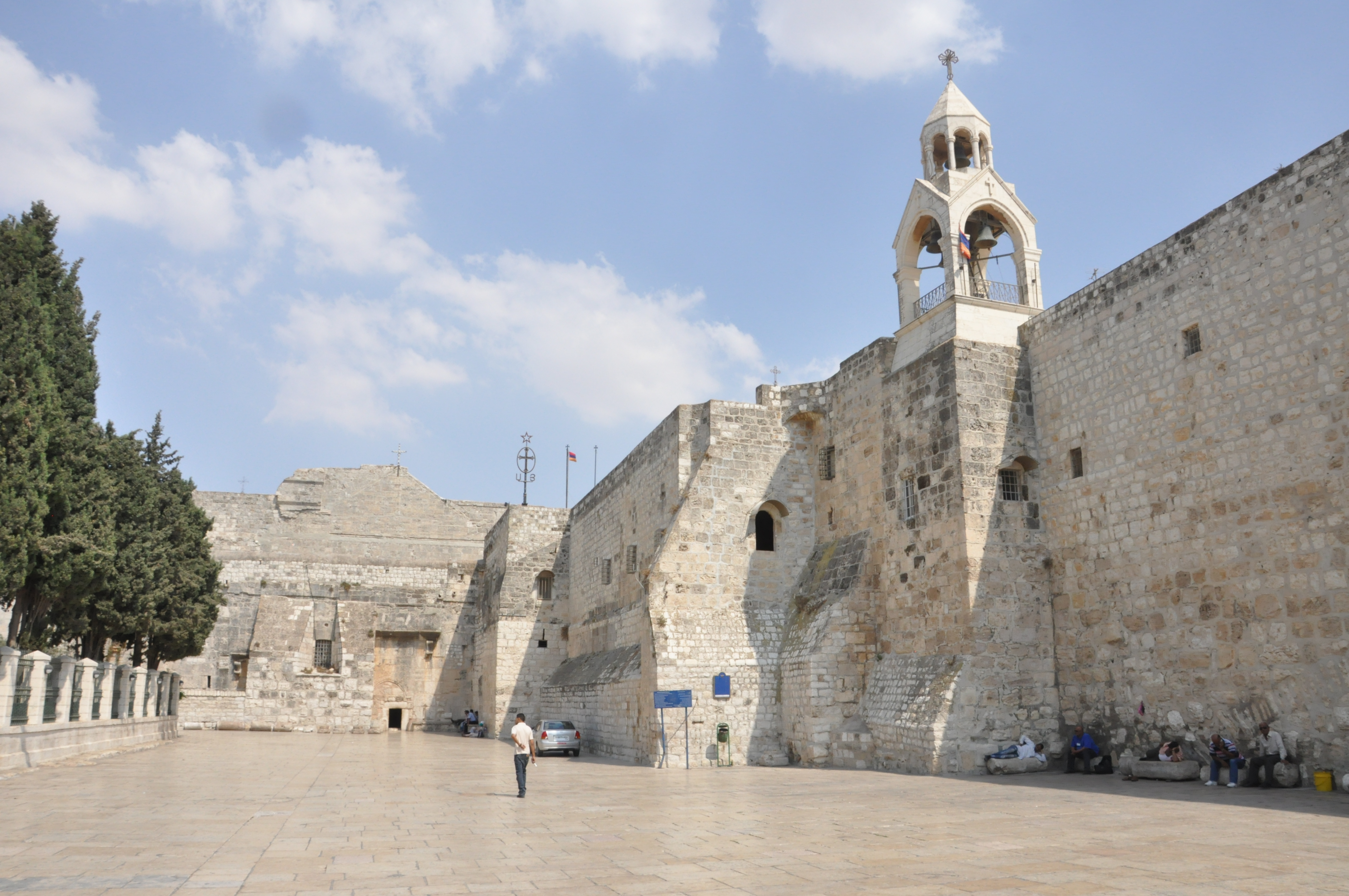
Church of the Nativity in Bethlehem

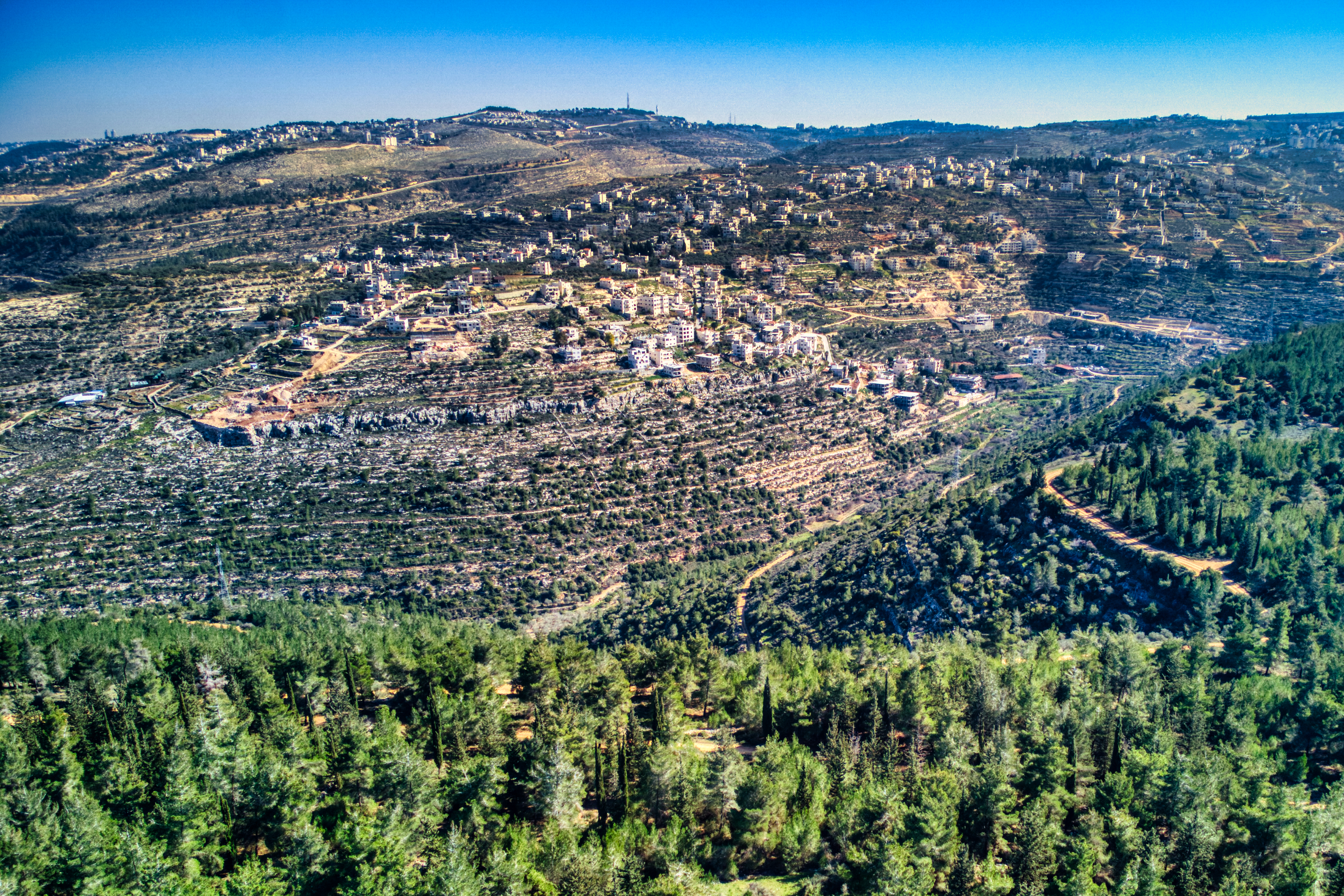
Battir (Land of Olives)

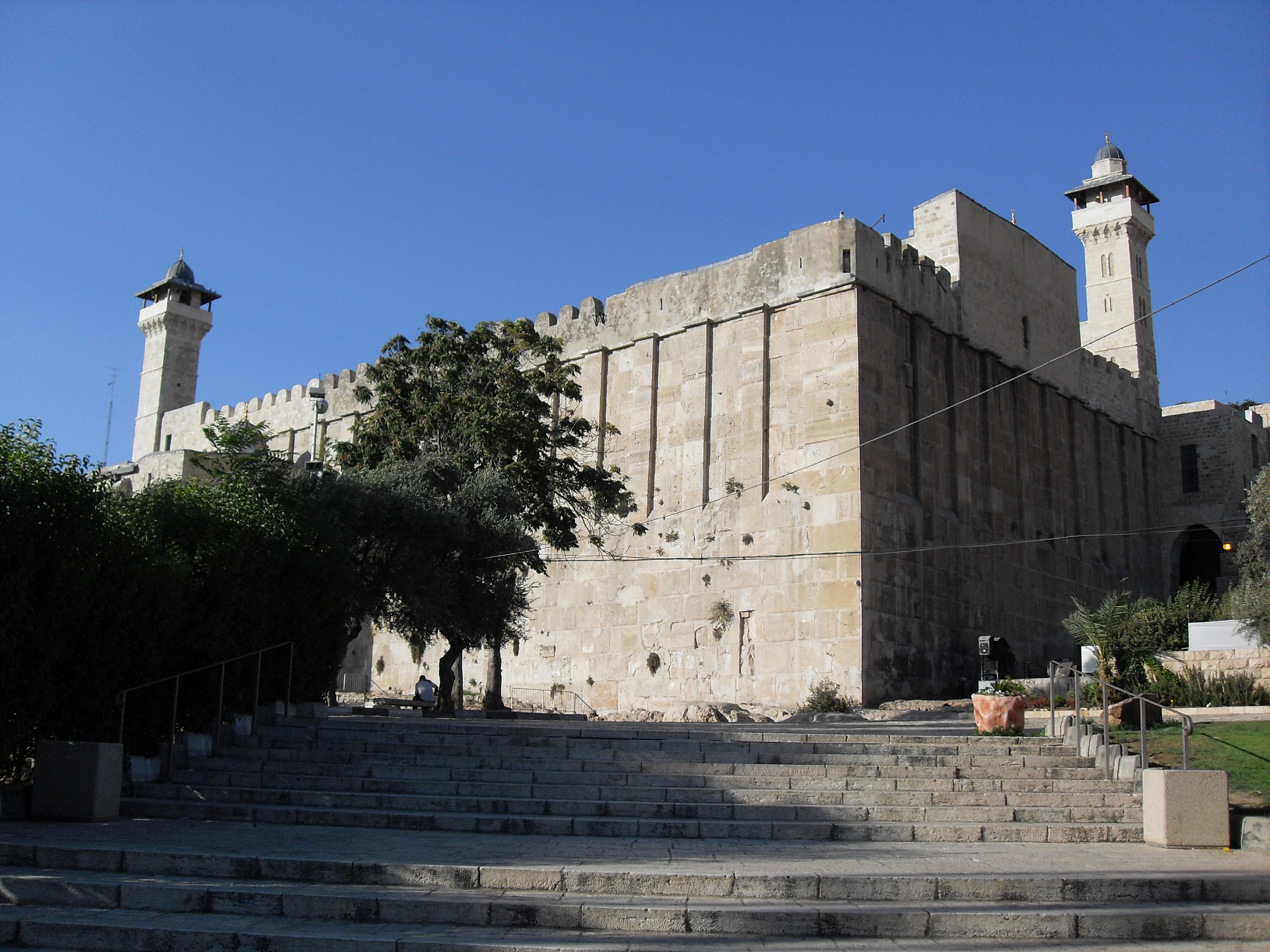
Hebron (Al-Khalil Old town)

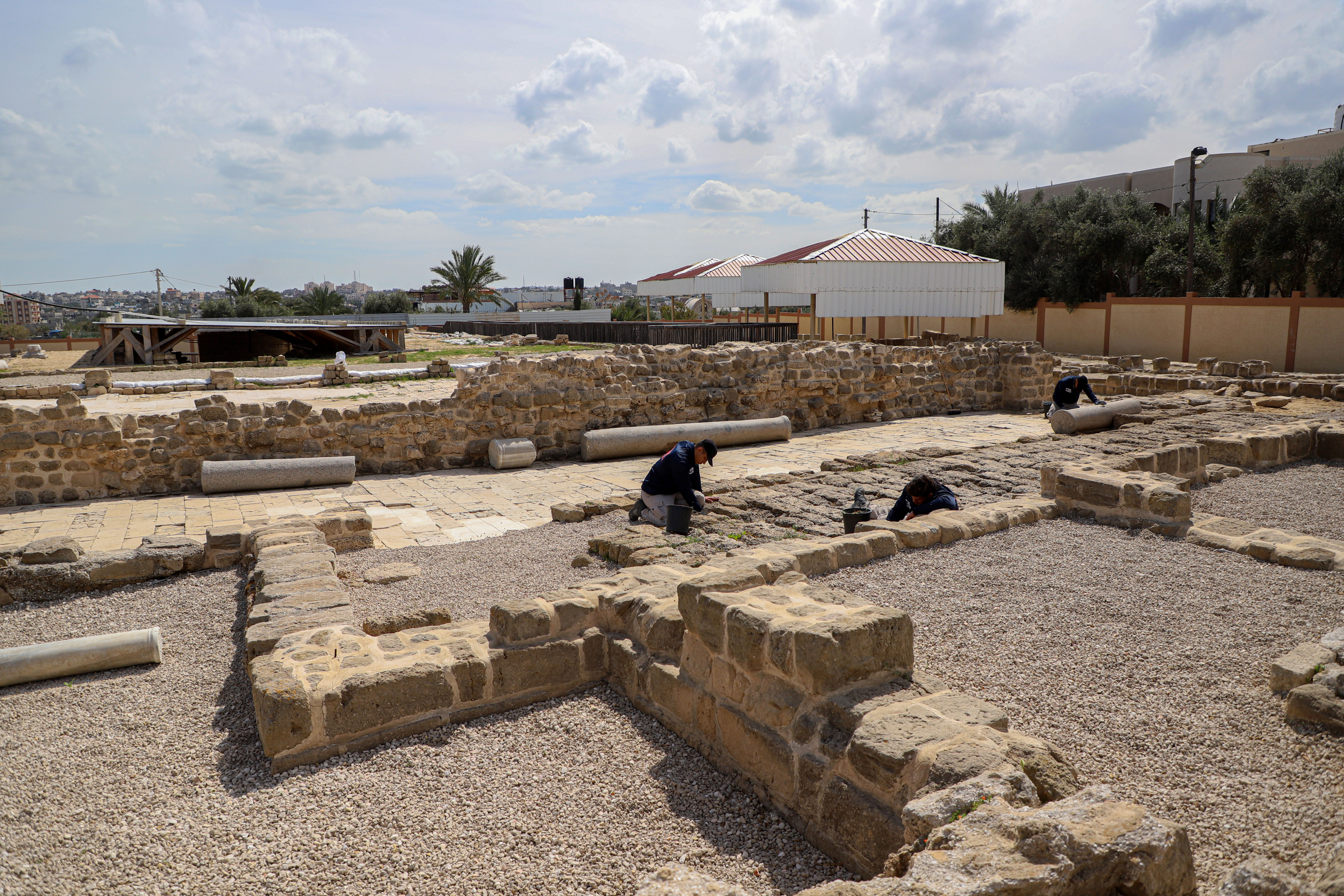
Tell Umm Amer (Saint Hilarion Monastery) Gaza

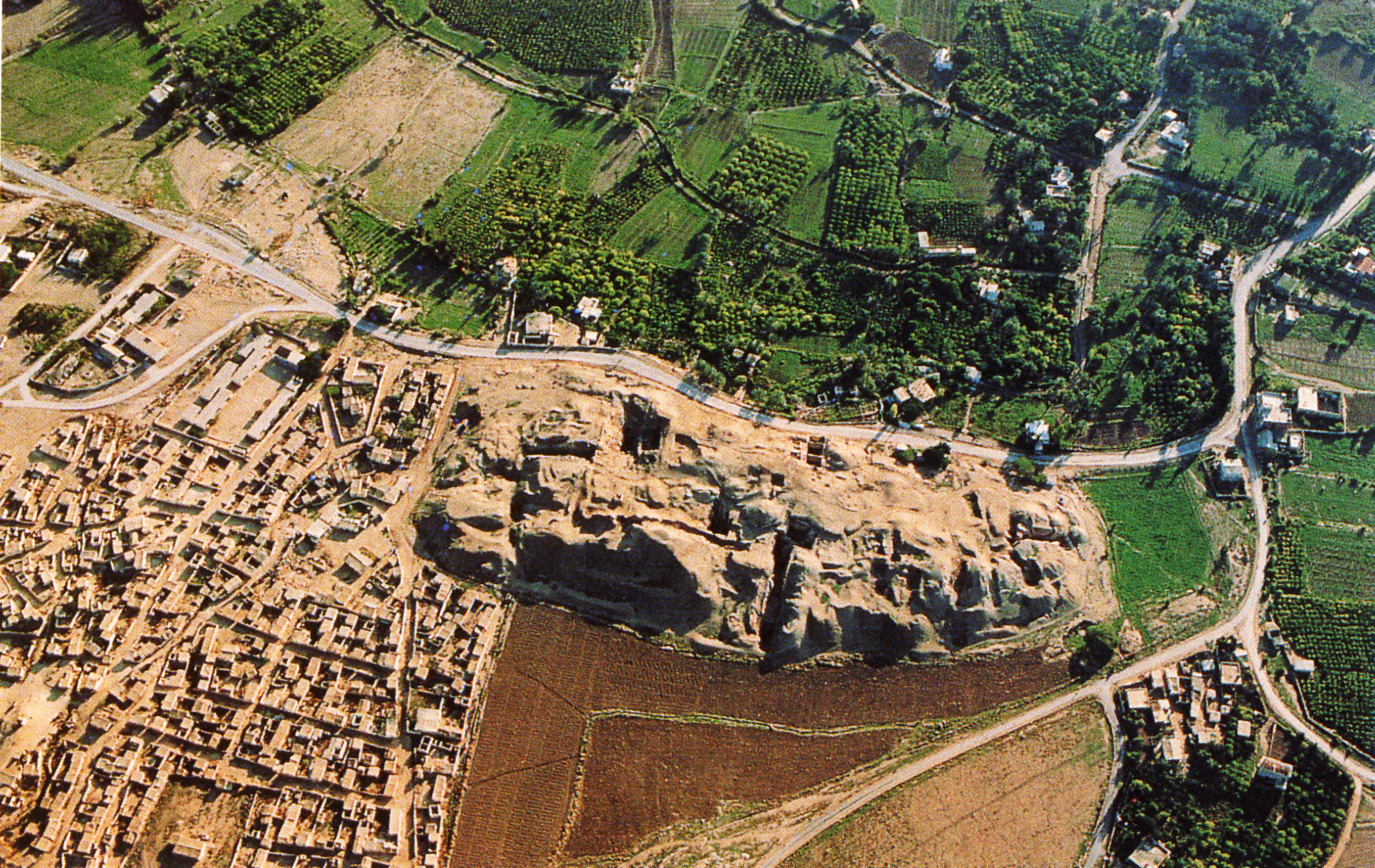
Tell es-Sultan (Ancient Jericho)

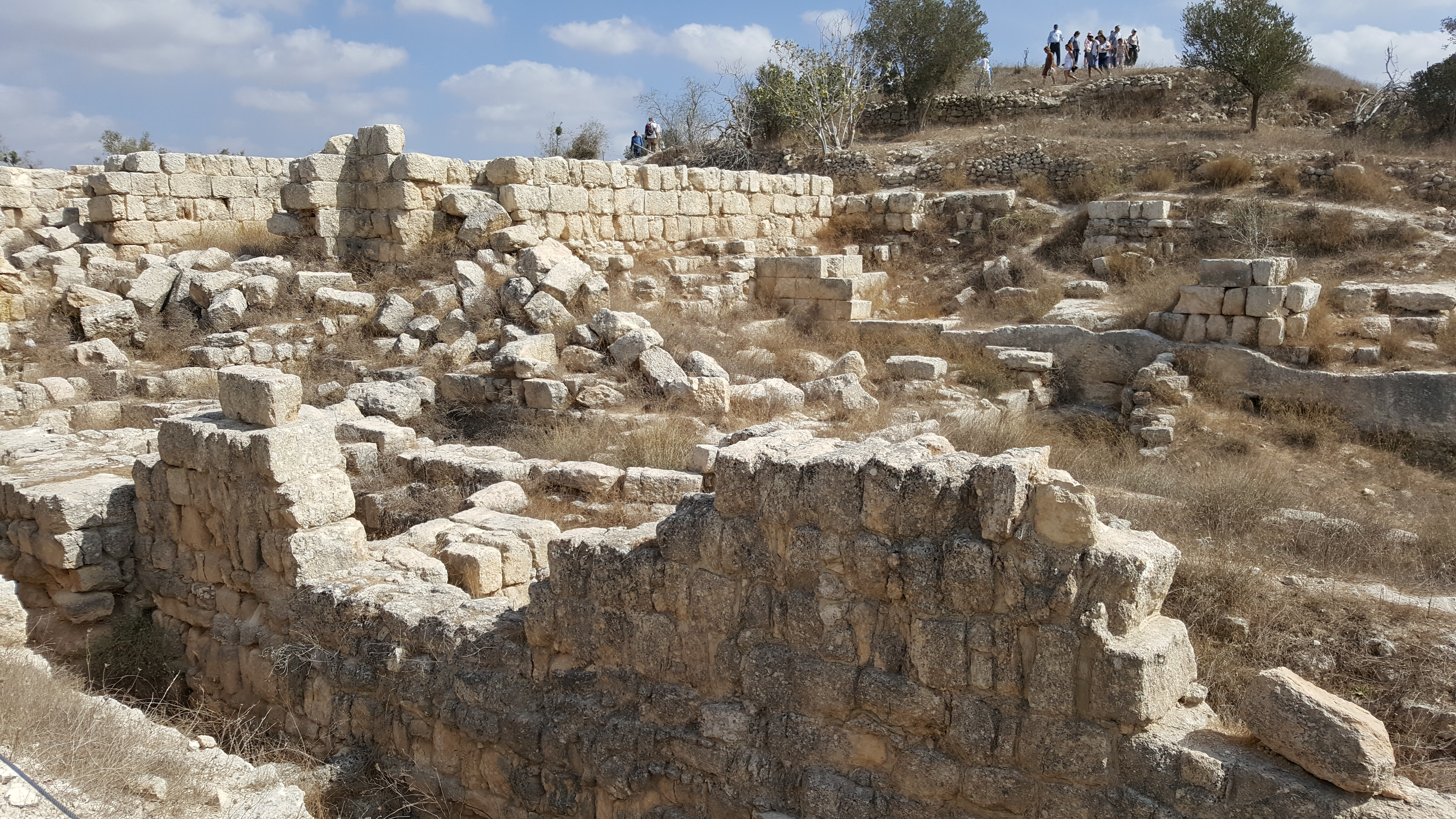
Sebastia

=== Tentative list ===
- Anthedon Harbour
- Archaeological Palaces of Tulul Abu el-'Alayiq
- Baptism Site "Eshria'a" (Al-Maghtas)
- Byzantine Church of Jabalia (Mukheitim)
- Canaanite city-states (Tell Balata, Tell al-Jib, Tell el-Rumeid)
- Cultural Landscape of Wady Kharitoun: Prehistoric Caves
- Dwelling Caves (Al-Maghayir) of Palestine
- Hisham's Palace/Khirbet al-Mafjar (Jericho)
- The Historic Centre of Gaza, including Omari Mosque and Porphyrius Church
- The Historic City of Nablus and its environs
- Jabal al-Fureidis/Herodium
- Jerusalem water system: Qanat es-Sabeel
- The Lower Jordan River Valley
- Maqāmāt (Shrines) in Palestine
- Modern Architecture in Palestine
- Monasteries of the Jerusalem Wilderness (El-Bariyah)
- Mount Gerizim and the Samaritans
- Throne Villages
- QUMRAN: Caves and Monastery of the Dead Sea Scrolls
- Umm Al-Rihan forest
- Wadi Gaza Coastal wetlands
- Wadi Natuf and Shuqba Cave

== Qatar ==
=== World Heritage Sites ===
- Al Zubarah Archaeological Site
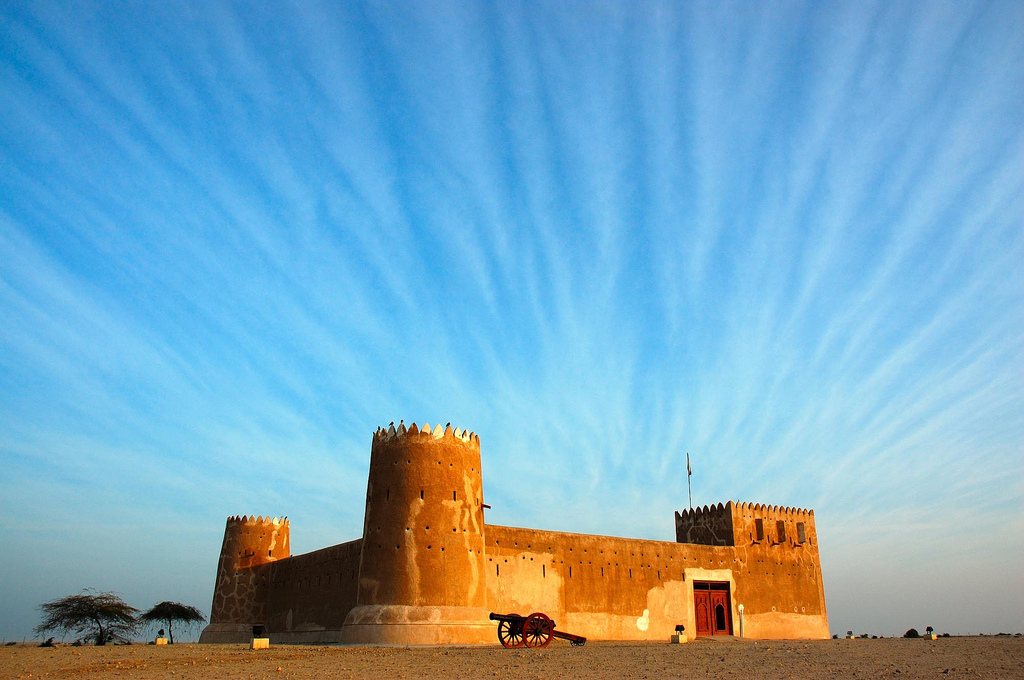
Al Zubarah Fort

=== Tentative list ===
- Khor Al Adaid natural reserve
- National Museum of Qatar (NMoQ)

== Saudi Arabia ==
=== World Heritage Sites ===
- Al-Ahsa Oasis
- Al-Hijr Archaeological Site (Madâin Sâlih)
- Historic Jeddah, the Gate to Makkah
- At-Turaif District in Diriyah
- Ḥimā Cultural Area
- Rock Art in the Hail Region
- The Cultural Landscape of Al-Faw Archaeological Area
- 'Uruq Bani Mu'arid Protected Area
Al-Hijr Archaeological Site (Madain Salih)

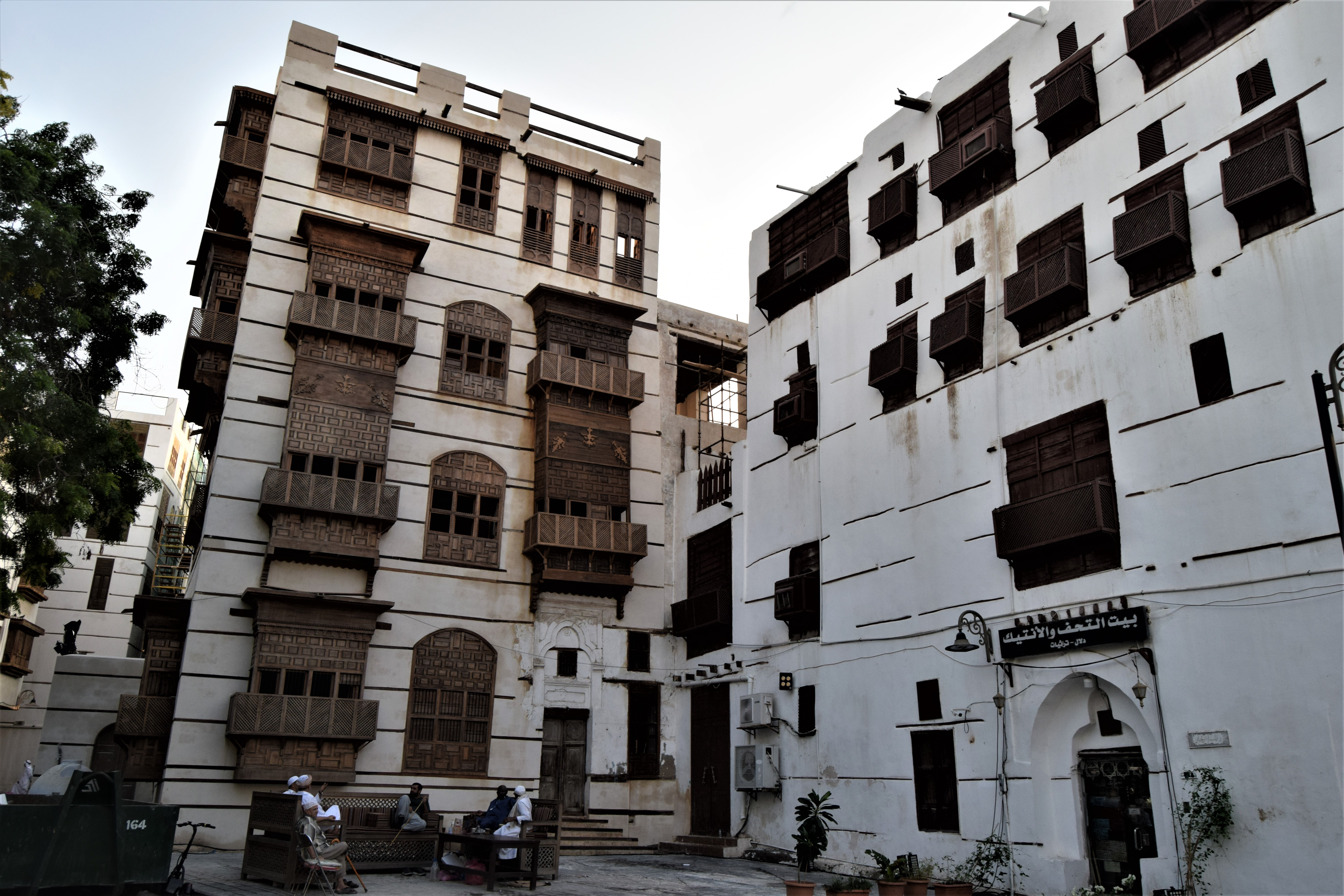
Historic Jeddah (Al-Balad)

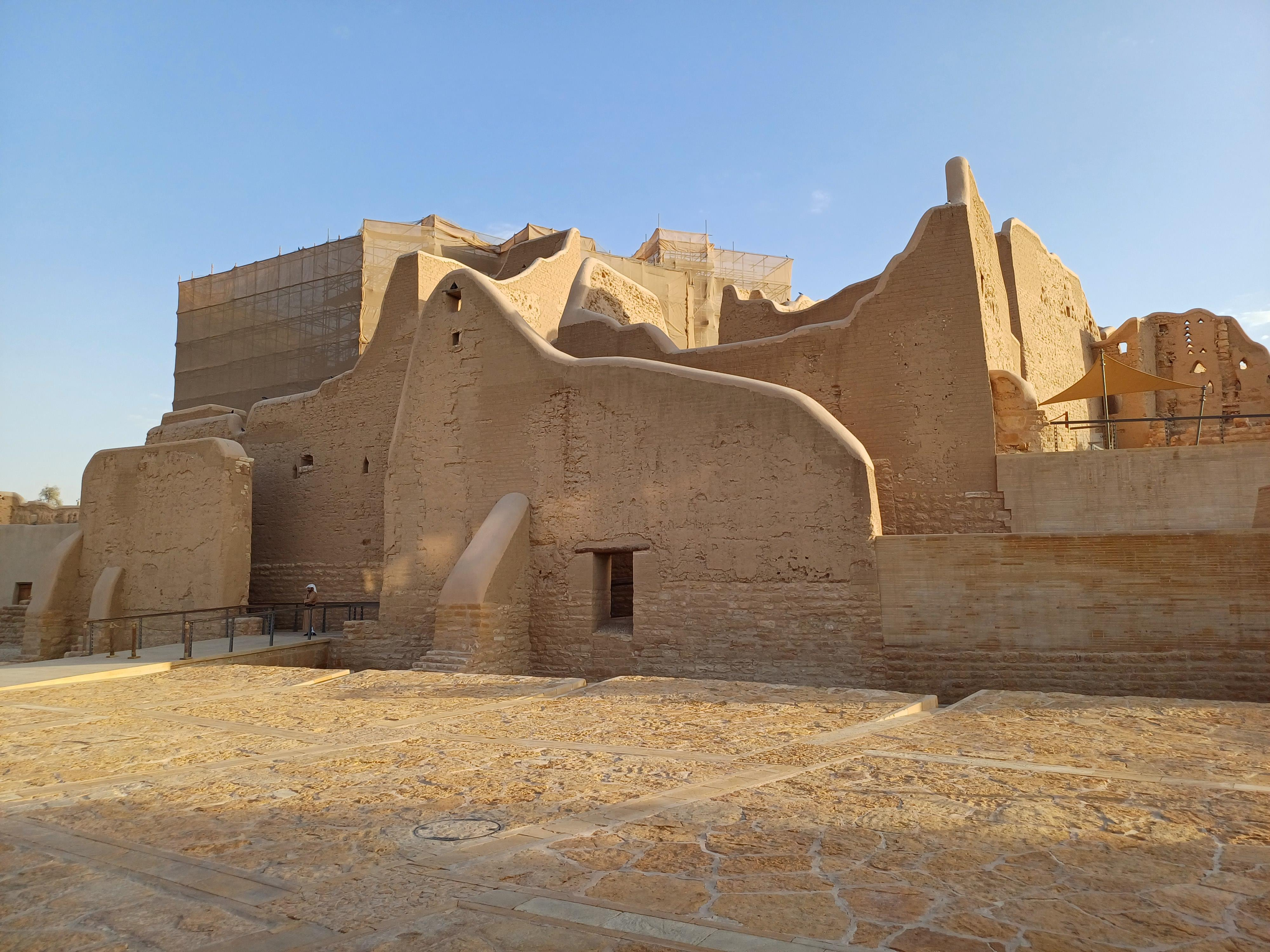
At-Turaif District in Diriyah (Riyadh)

Al-Ahsa Oasis

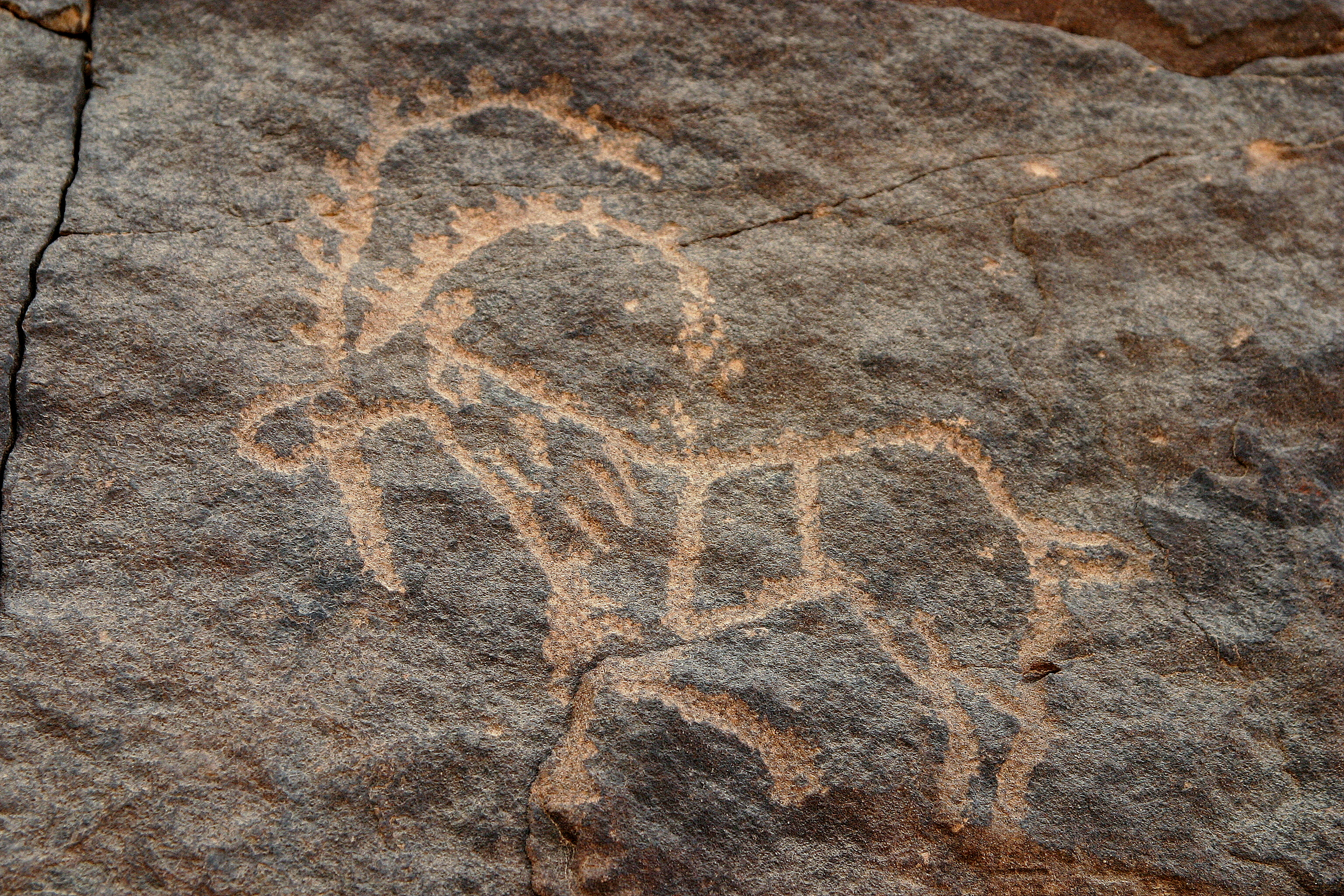
Bir Hima Rock Petroglyphs and Inscriptions

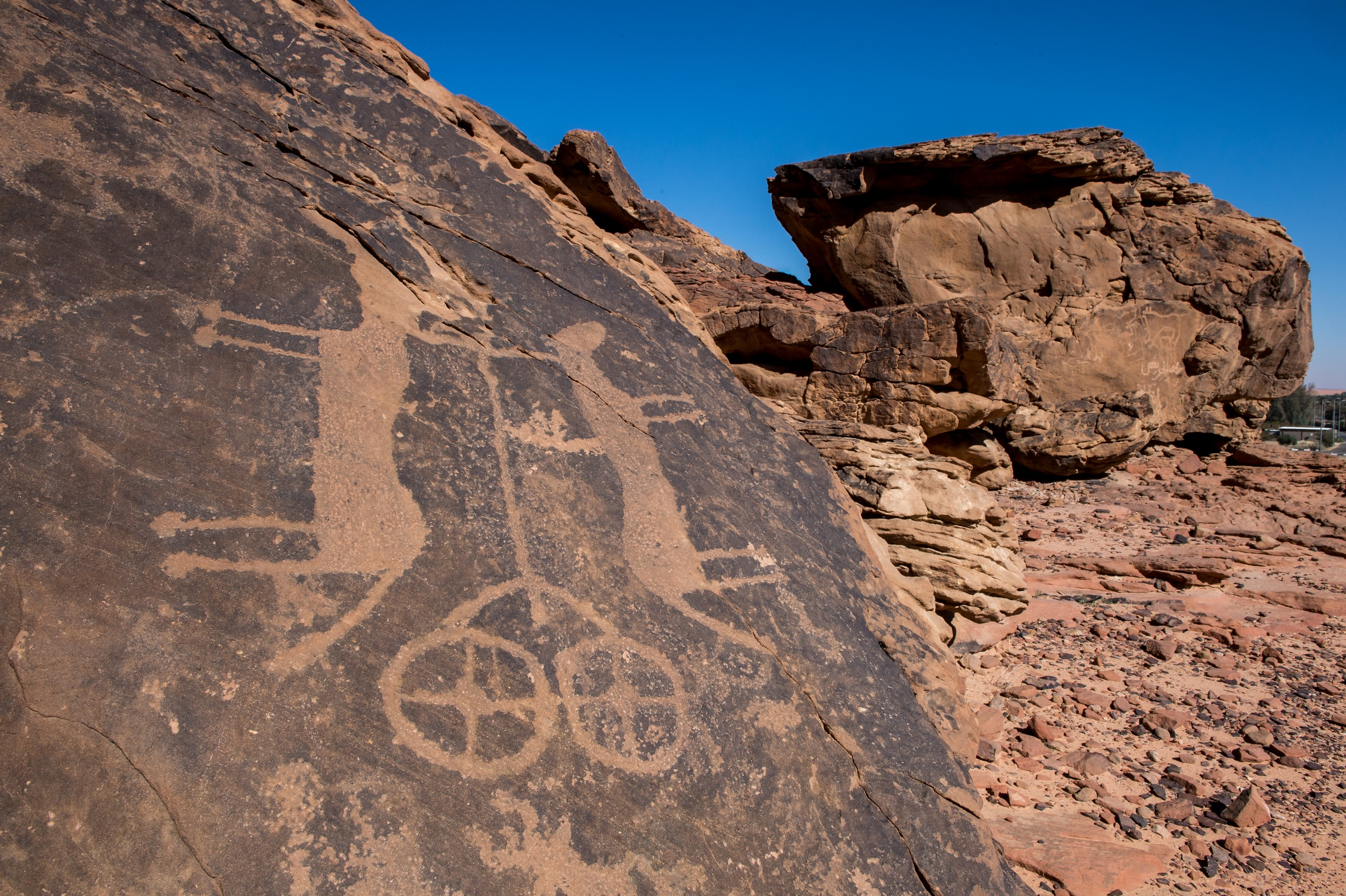
Rock Art in the Ha'il Region

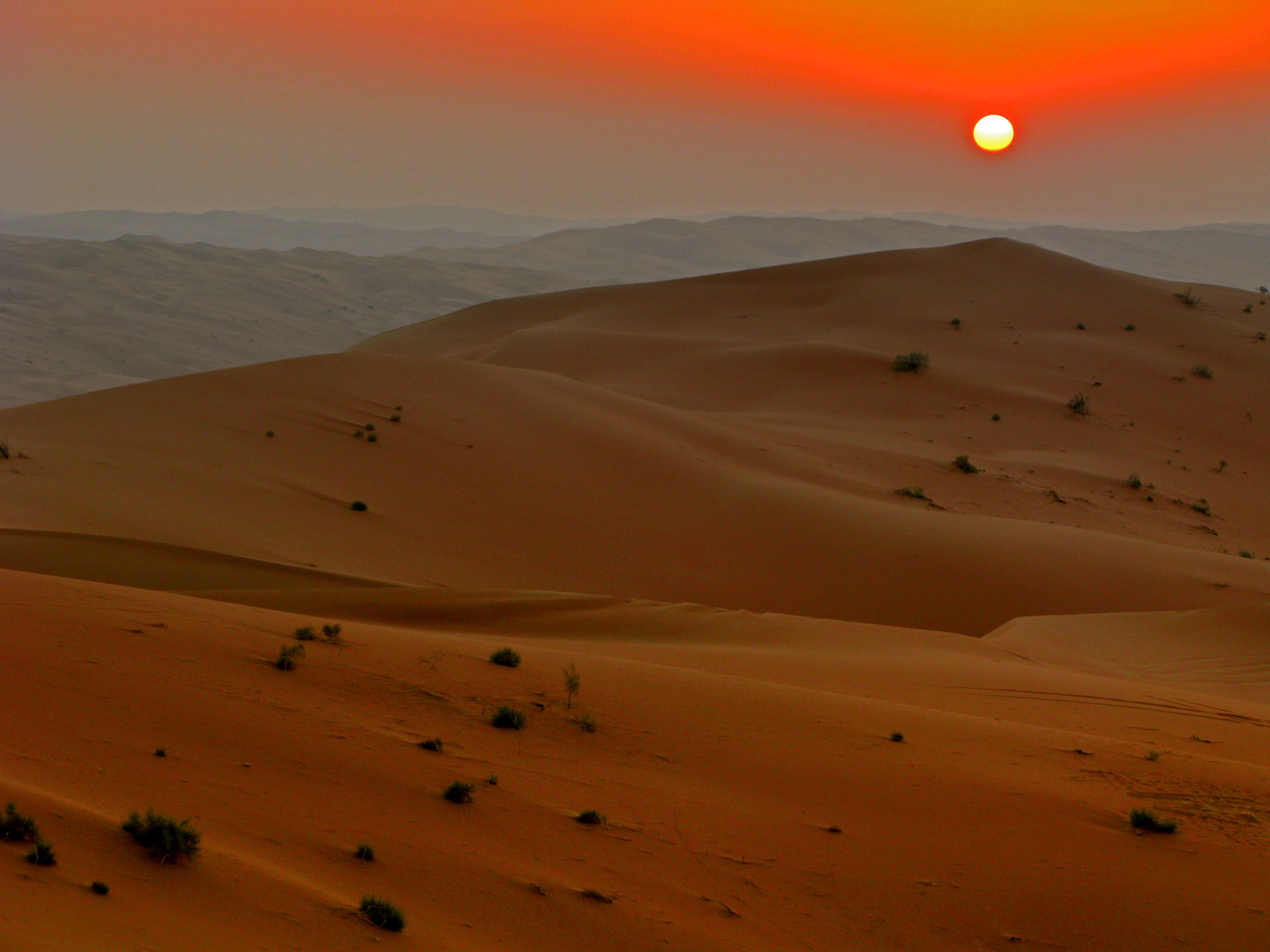
'Uruq Bani Mu'arid

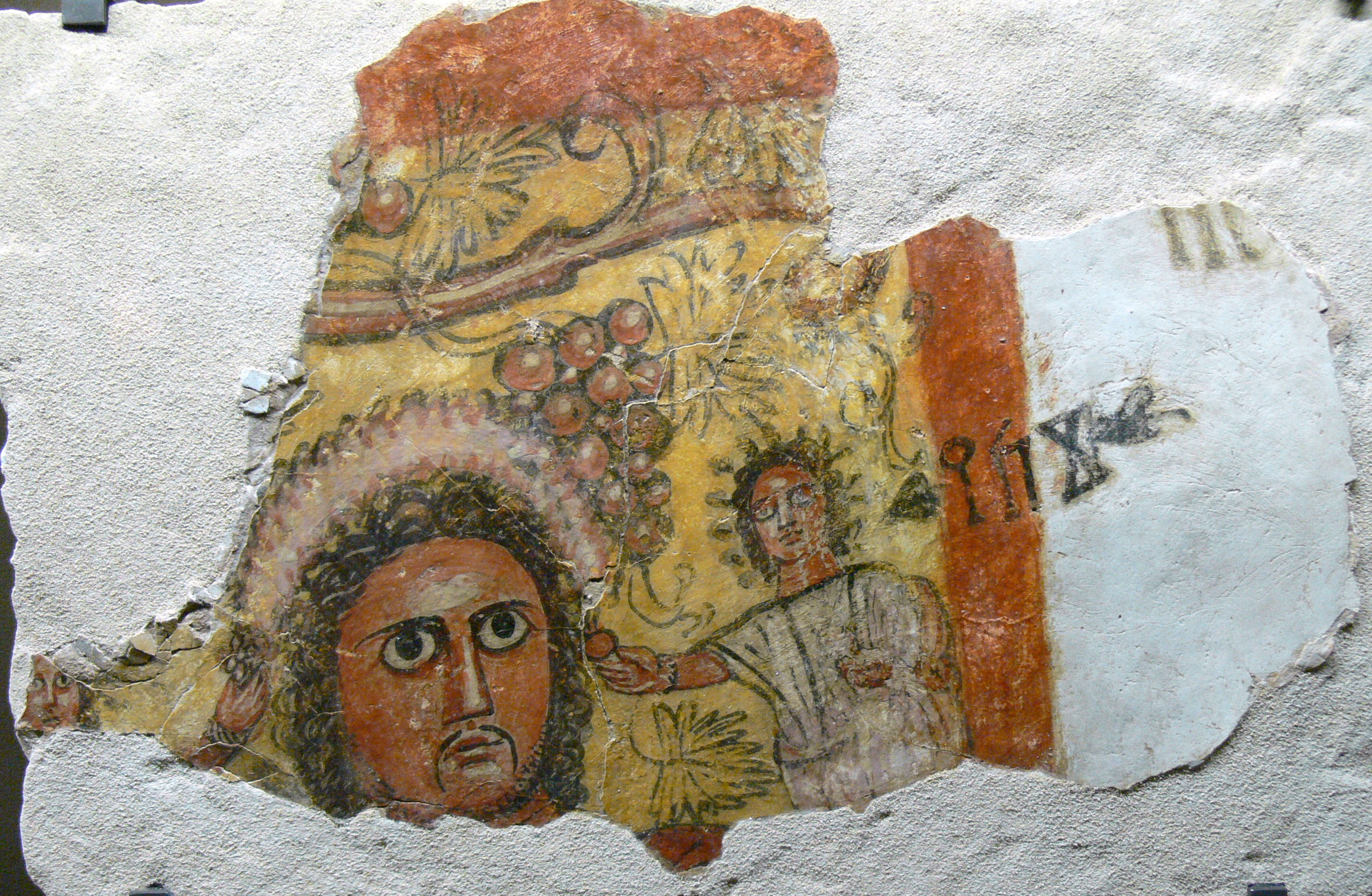
Qaryat al-Faw

=== Tentative list ===
- Coral Reefs of the Gulf of Aqaba and the Red Sea in the Kingdom of Saudi Arabia
- Farasan Islands Protected Area
- Egyptian Hajj Road
- Hejaz Railway
- Rijal Almaa Heritage Village in Assir Region
- The Ancient Walled Oases of Northern Arabia
- The Hajj Pilgrimage Routes: The Darb Zubaydah
- The Rural Cultural Landscapes of Sarawat Mountains
- The Oil Industrial Heritage in Saudi Arabia
- Zee Ain Heritage Village in Al-Baha Region

== Sudan ==
=== World Heritage Sites ===
- Archaeological Sites of the Island of Meroe
- Gebel Barkal and the Sites of the Napatan Region
- Sanganeb Marine National Park and Dungonab Bay – Mukkawar Island Marine National Park
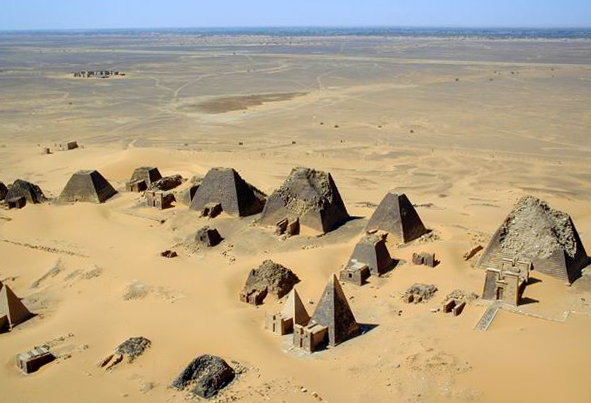
Meroë pyramids

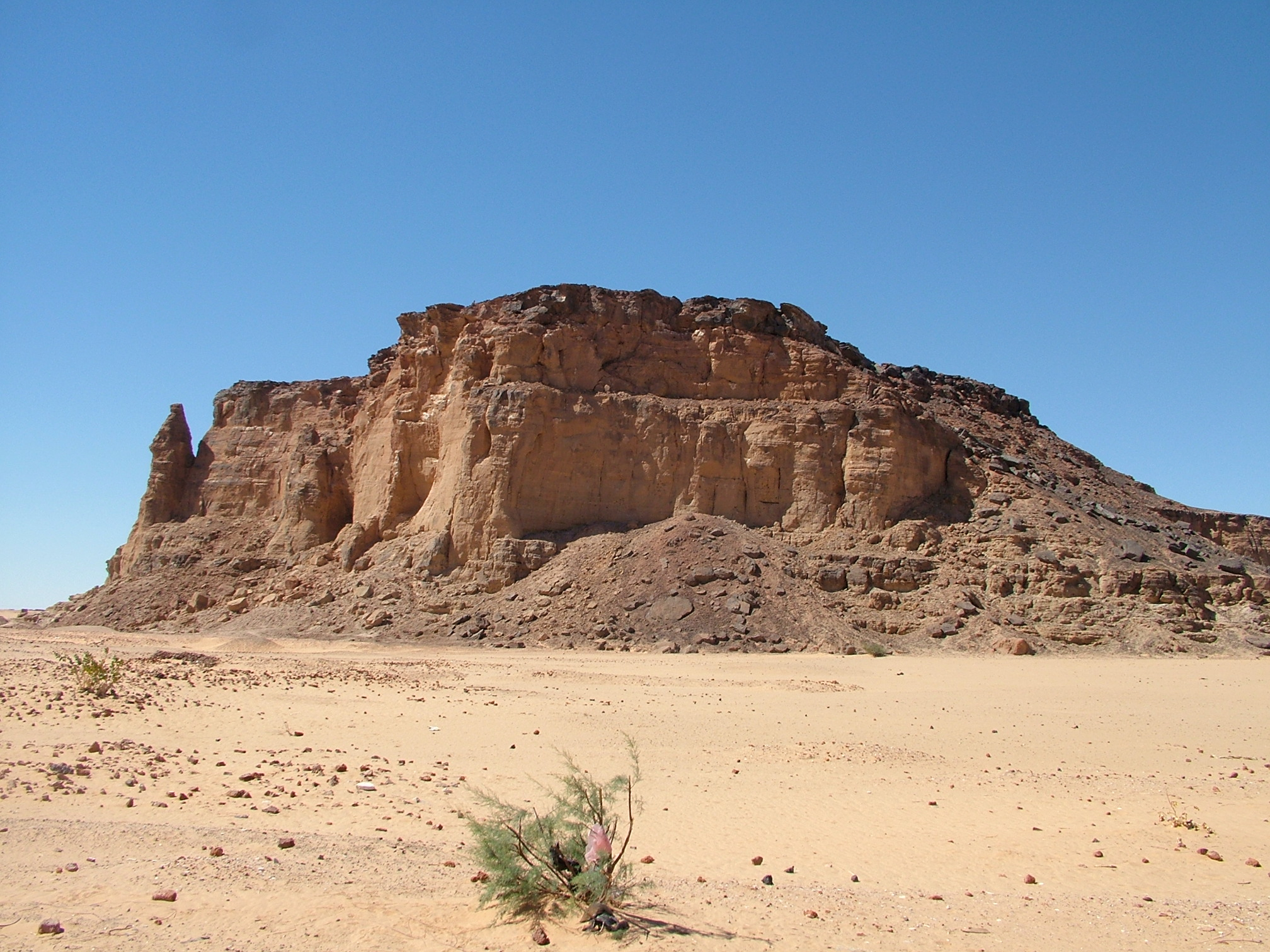
Jebel Barkal

=== Tentative list ===
- Al Hassania National Park
- Al Khandaq Village
- Al Radom National Park
- Banganarti
- Dinder National Park
- Old Dongola
- Jebel Al Dair National Park
- Jebel Marra / Deriba Caldera (crater lake)
- Kerma
- Suakin
- Sai Island
- The Monuments of the Kingdom of Kerma and Dokki Geil
- The Temple of Soleb
- Wadi Howar National Park
- Wadi Hower National Park - Gala Abou Ahmed (mixed natural and cultural site)

== Syria ==
=== World Heritage Sites ===
- Ancient City of Aleppo
- Ancient City of Bosra
- Ancient City of Damascus
- Ancient Villages of Northern Syria
- Crac des Chevaliers and Qal'at Salah El-Din
- Site of Palmyra
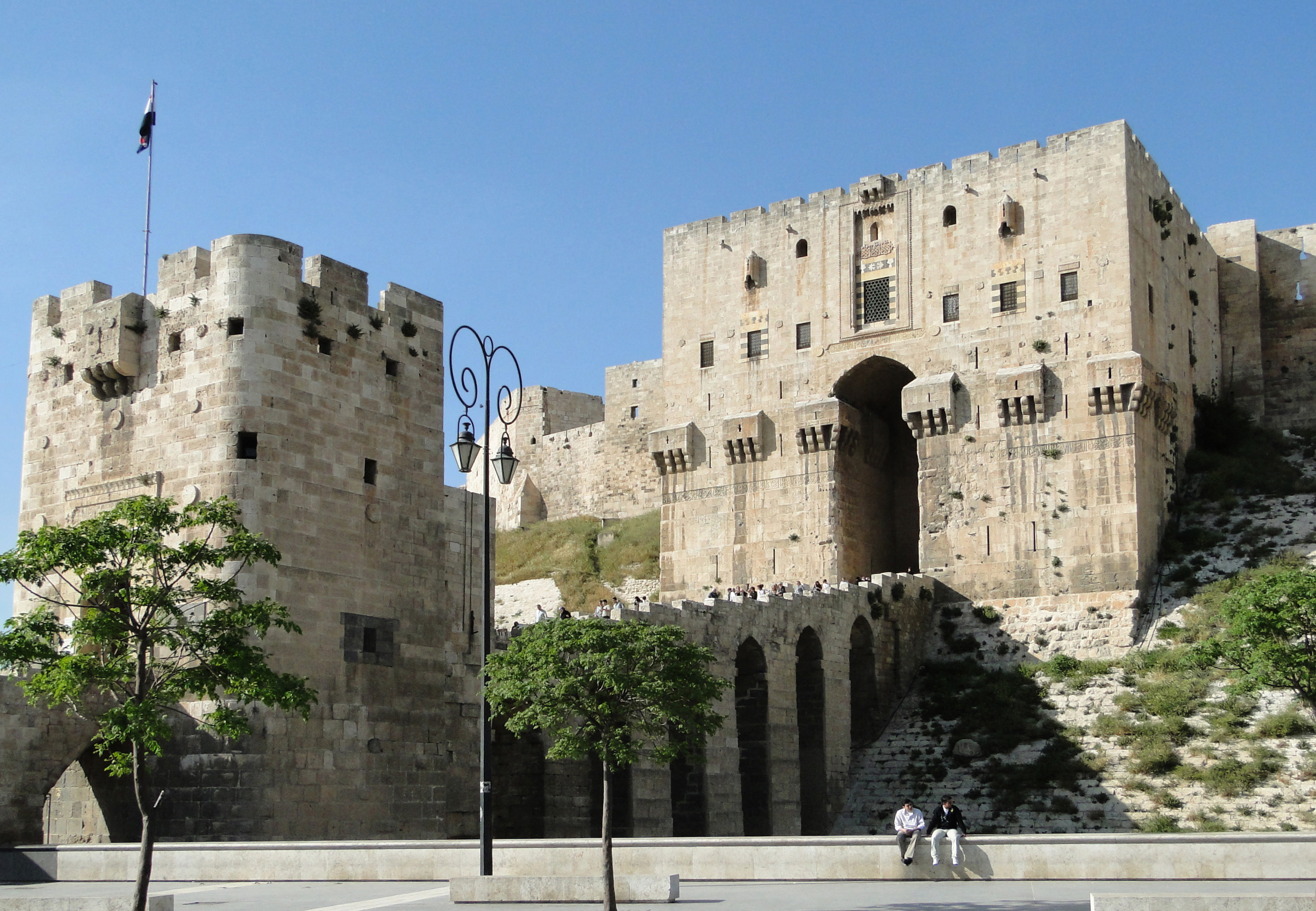
Ancient Aleppo

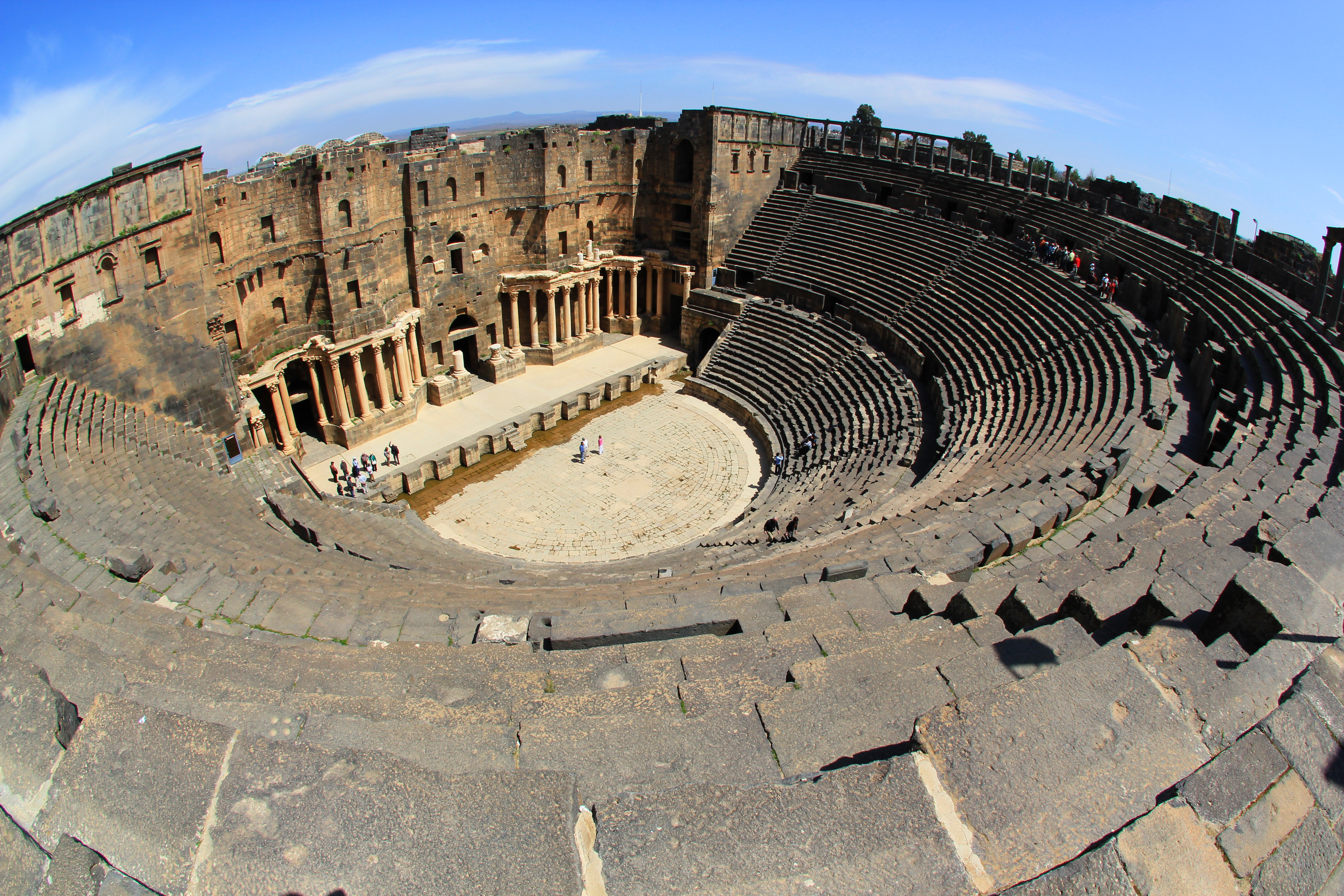
Ancient Bosra

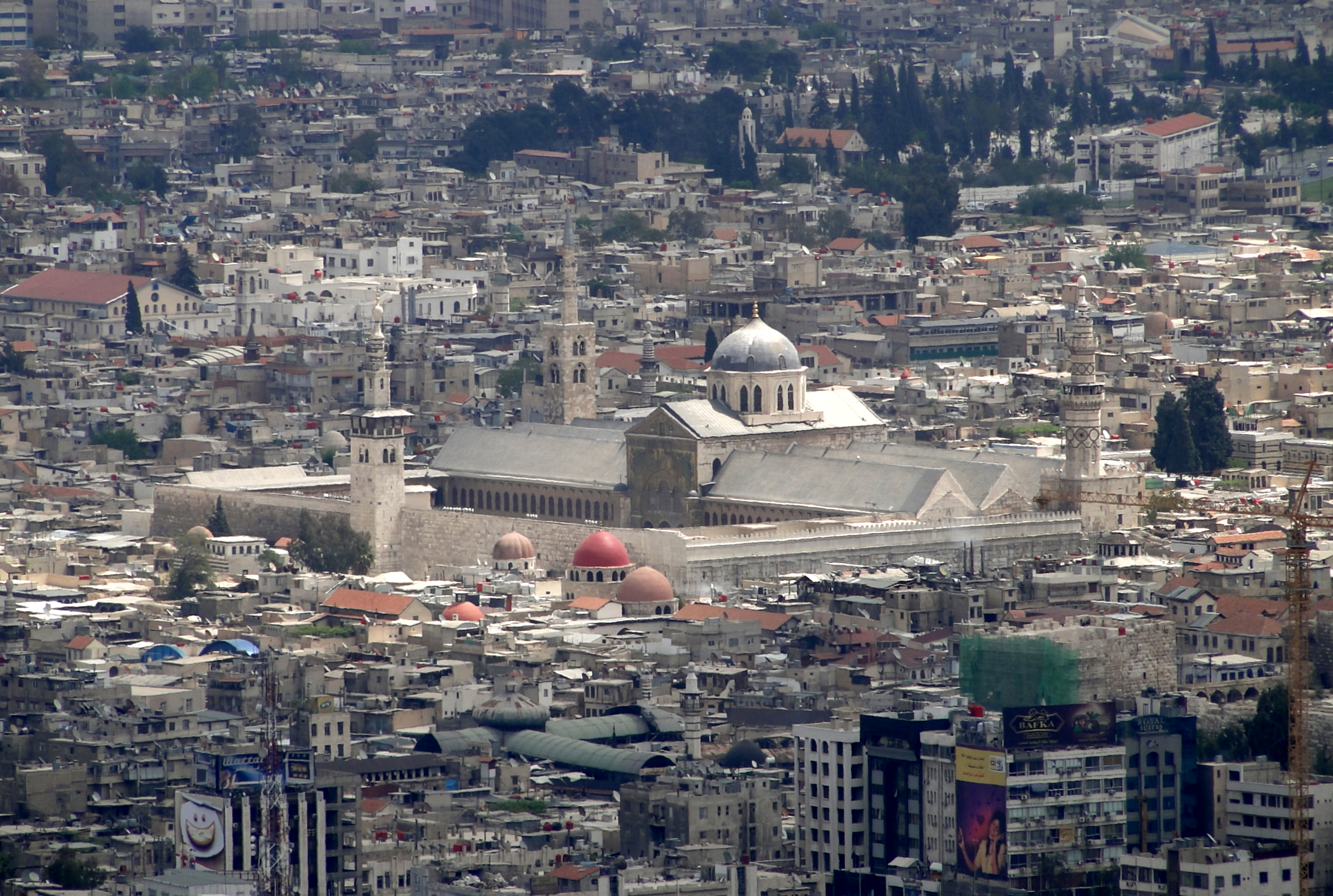
Ancient Damascus

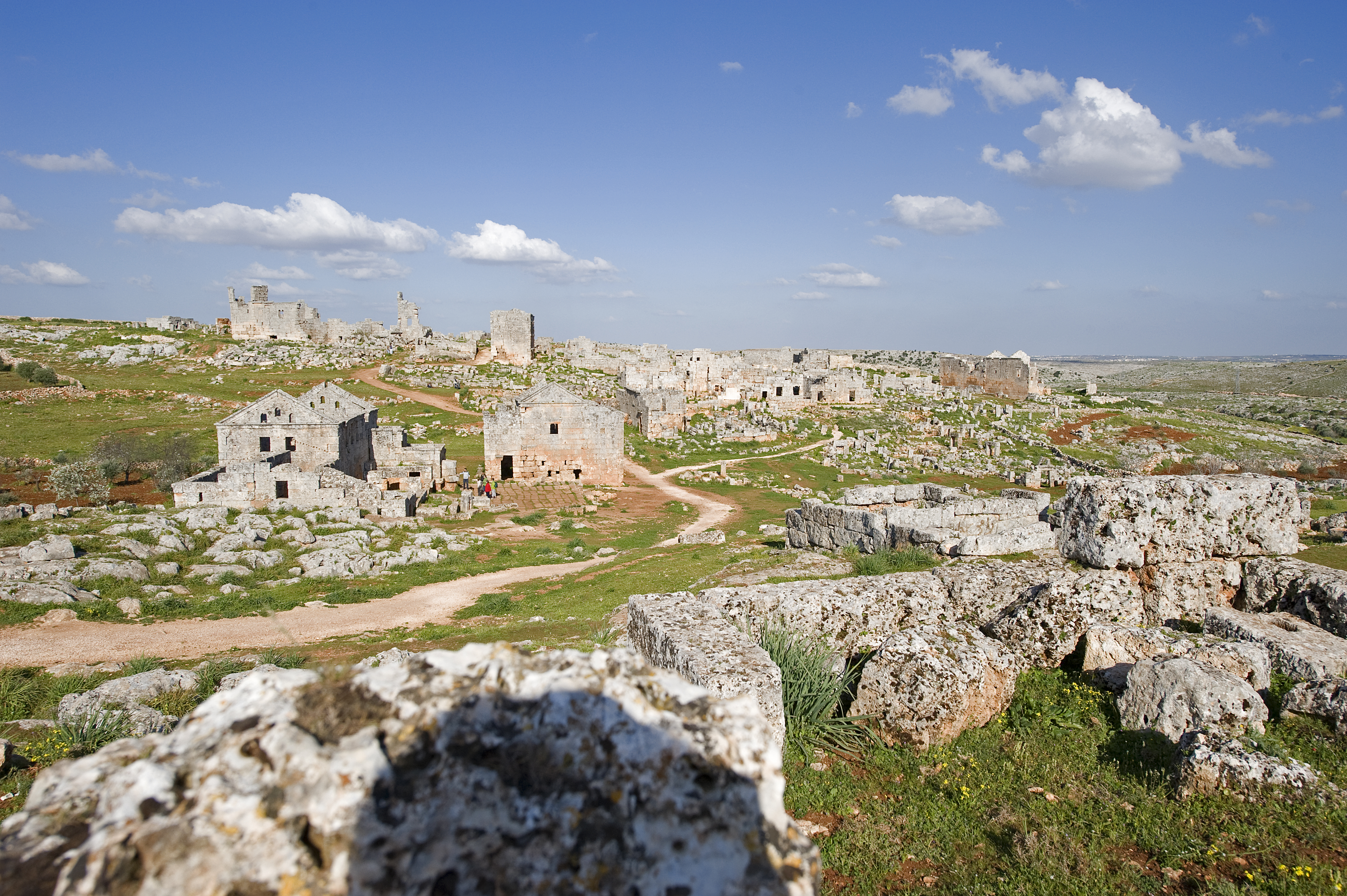
Dead Cities

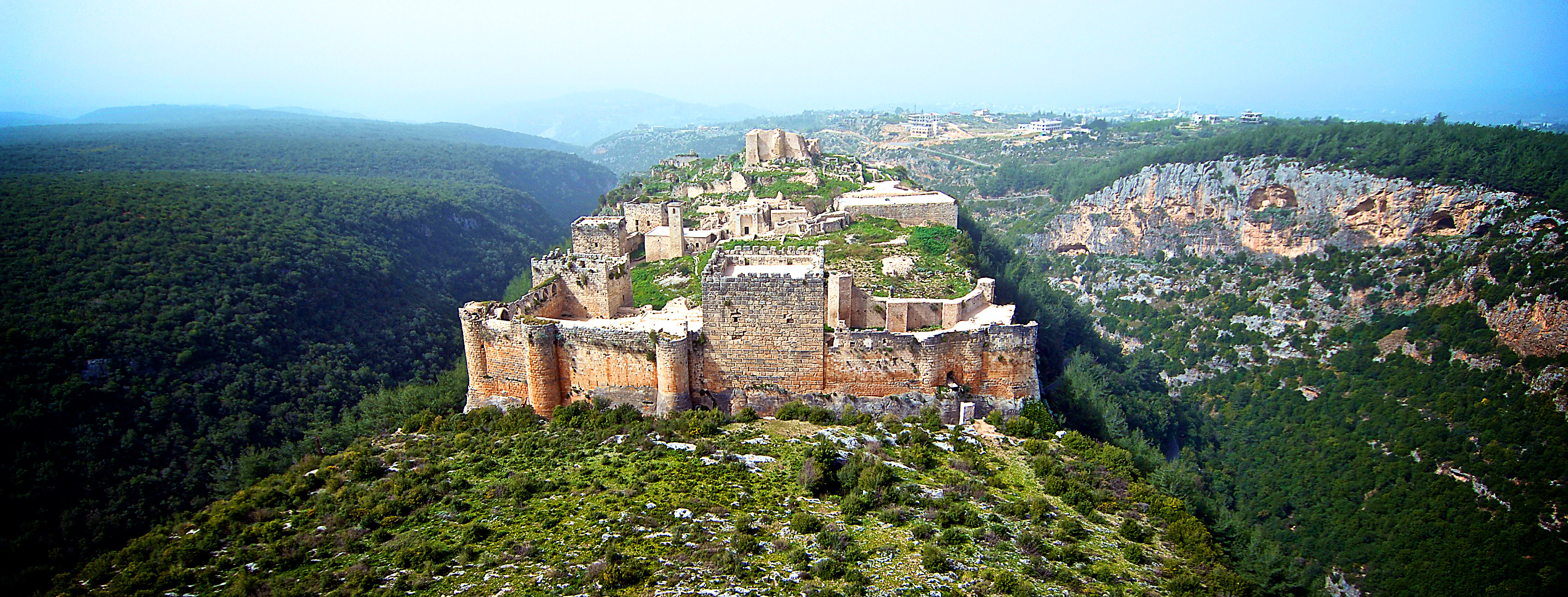
Qal'at Salah El-Din (pictured) and Crac des Chevaliers

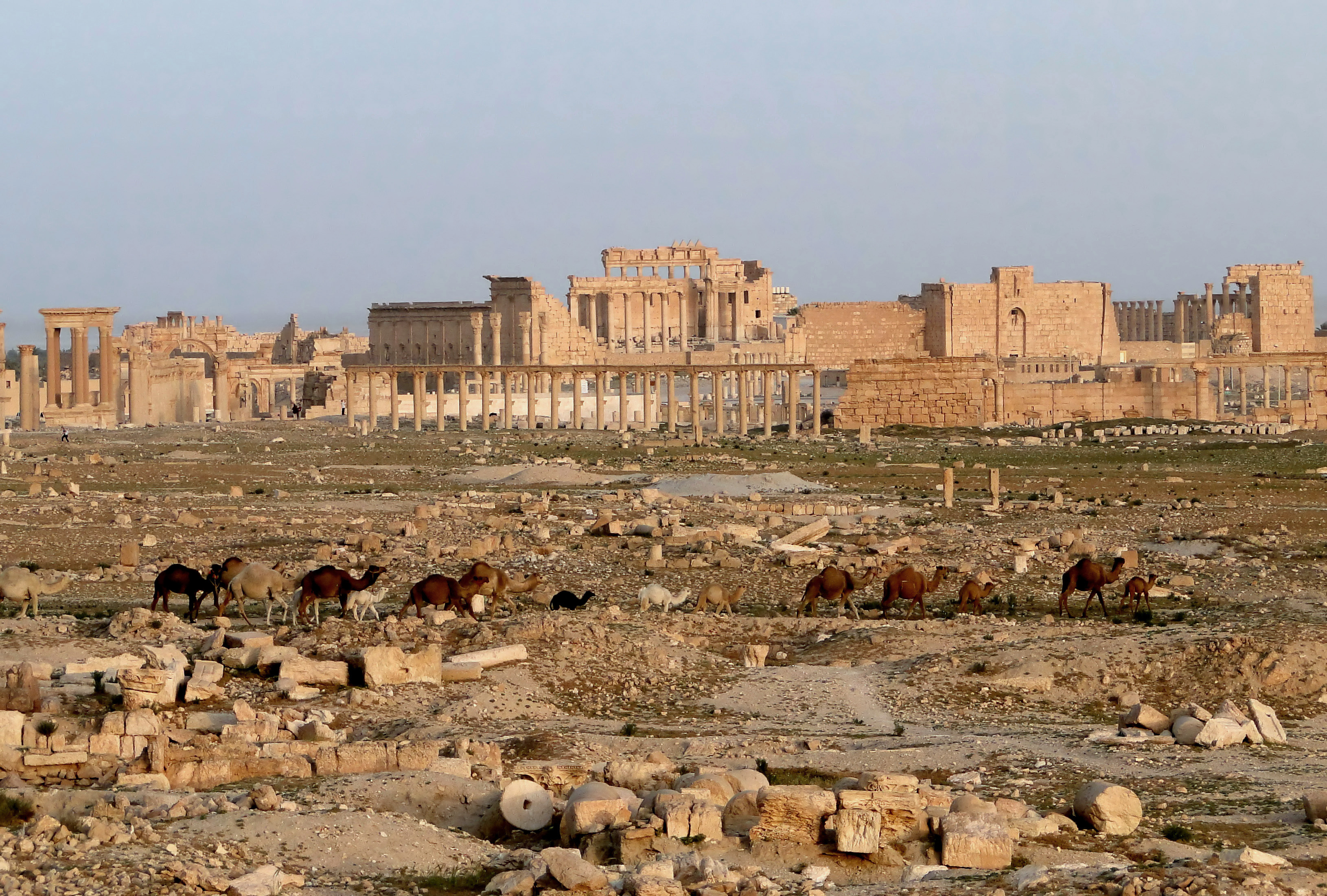
Palmyra

=== Tentative list ===
- Norias of Hama
- Ugarit (Tell Shamra)
- Ebla (Tell Mardikh)
- Mari (Tell Hariri)
- Dura-Europos
- Apamea (Afamia)
- Desert Castle: Qasr al-Hayr al-Sharqi
- Ma'loula
- Tartus: The City-fortress of the Crusaders
- Raqqa-Rafiqah: The Abbasid City
- Island of Arwad
- Mari & Dura-Europos: Sites of Euphrates Valley

== Tunisia ==
=== World Heritage Sites ===
- Amphitheatre of El Jem
- Archaeological Site of Carthage
- Dougga / Thugga
- Djerba: Testimony to a settlement pattern in an island territory
- Ichkeul National Park
- Kairouan
- Medina of Sousse
- Medina of Tunis
- Punic Town of Kerkuane and its Necropolis
- Village of Sidi Bou Said
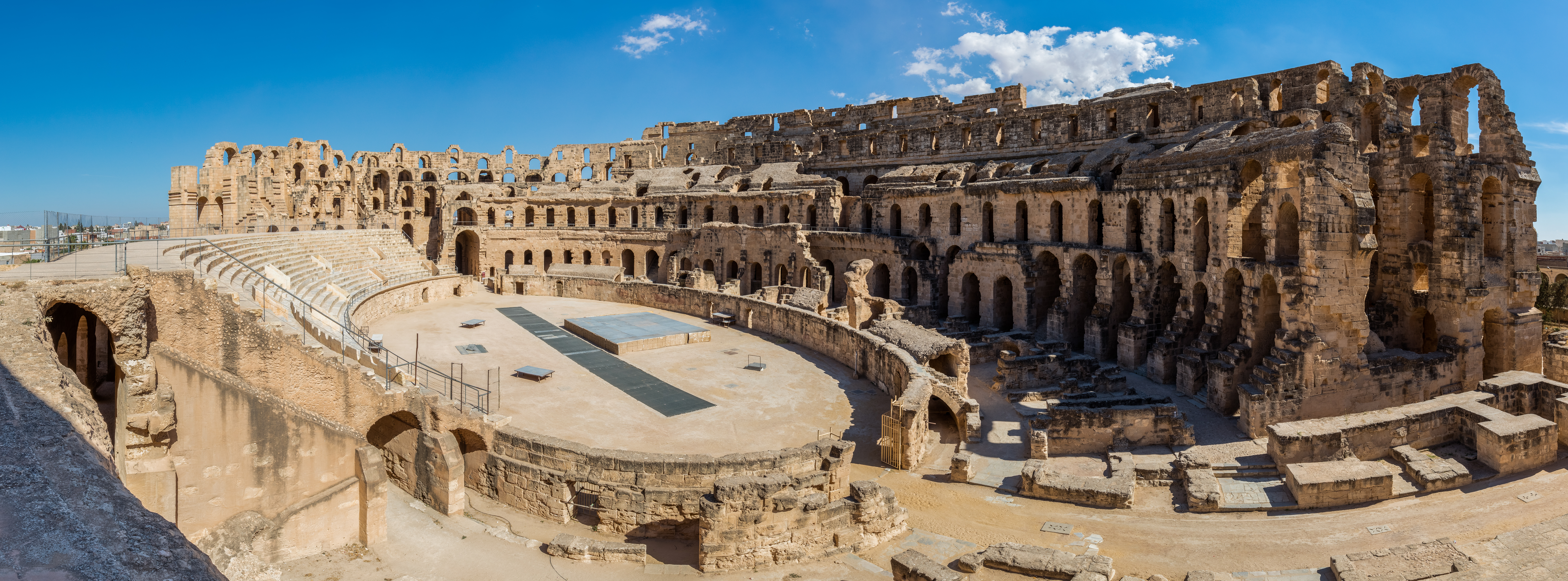
Amphitheatre of El Jem

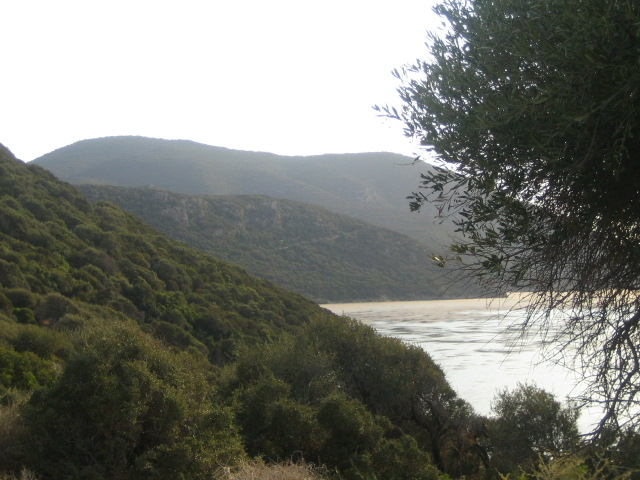
Lake Ichkeul

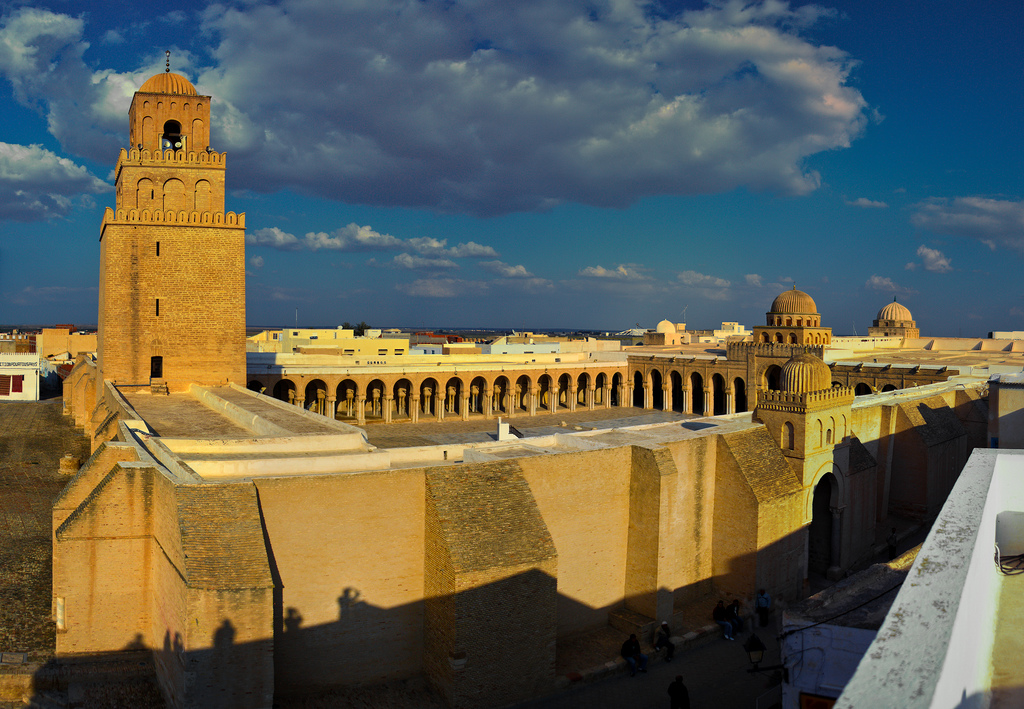
Kairouan

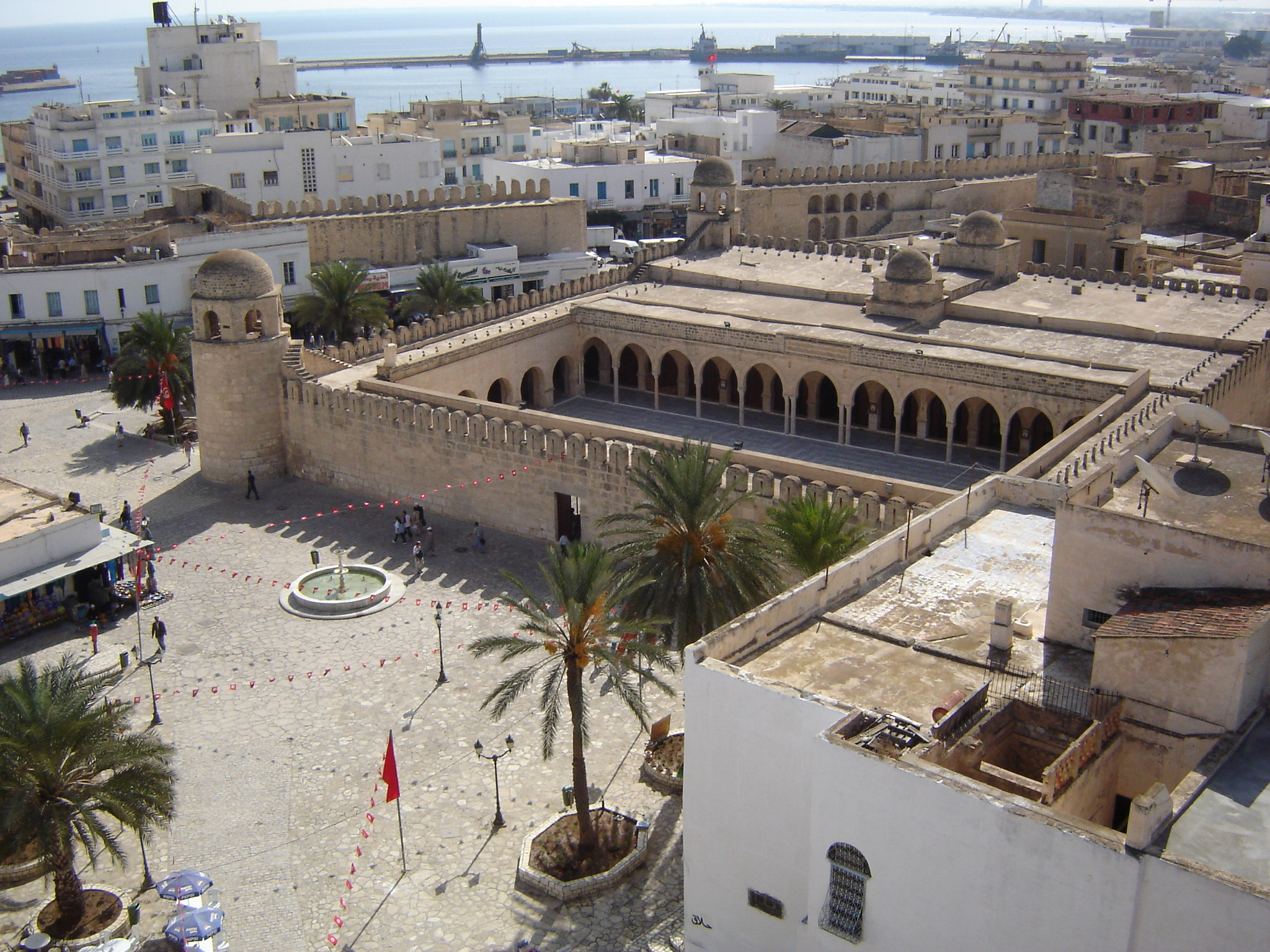
Medina of Sousse

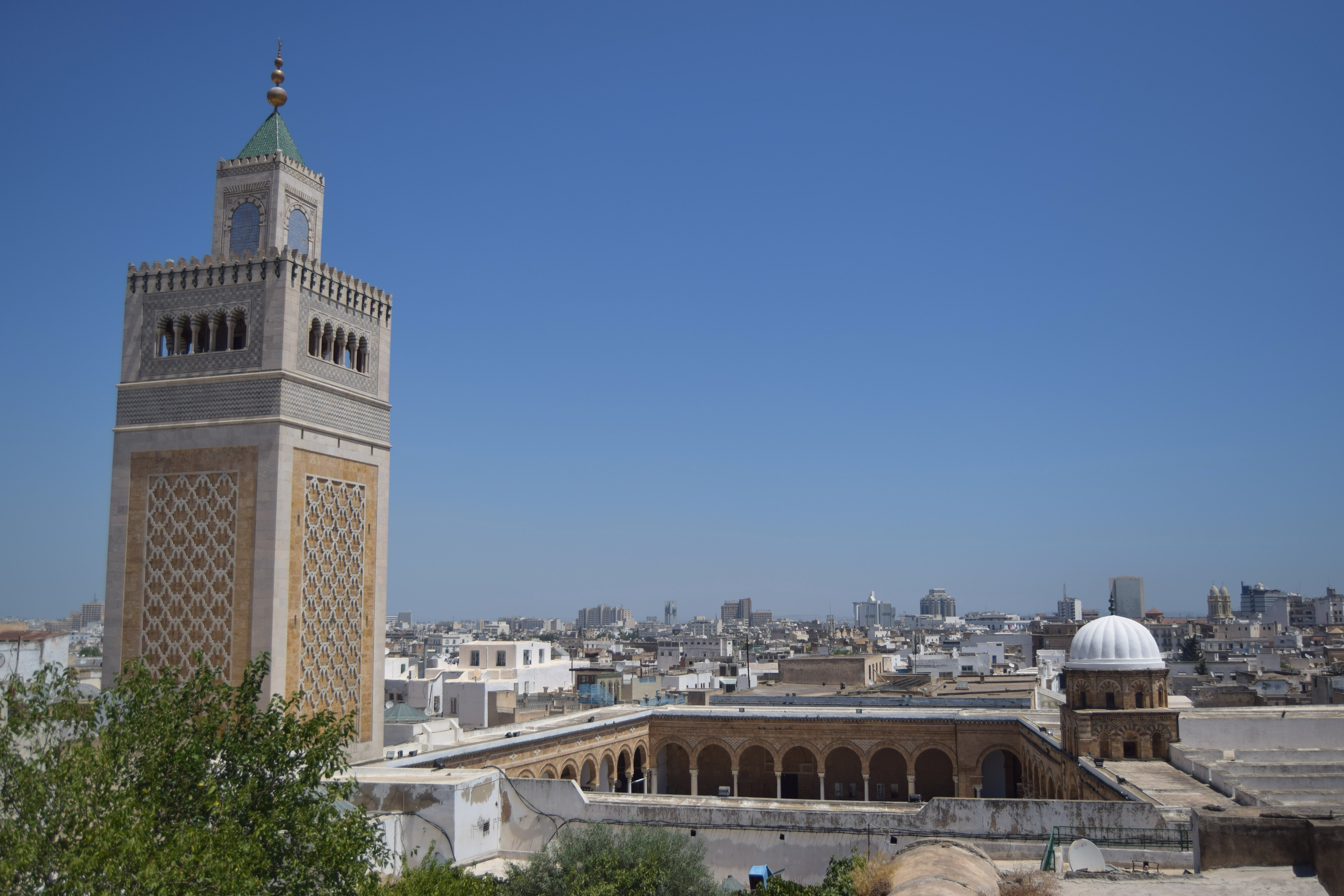
Medina of Tunis

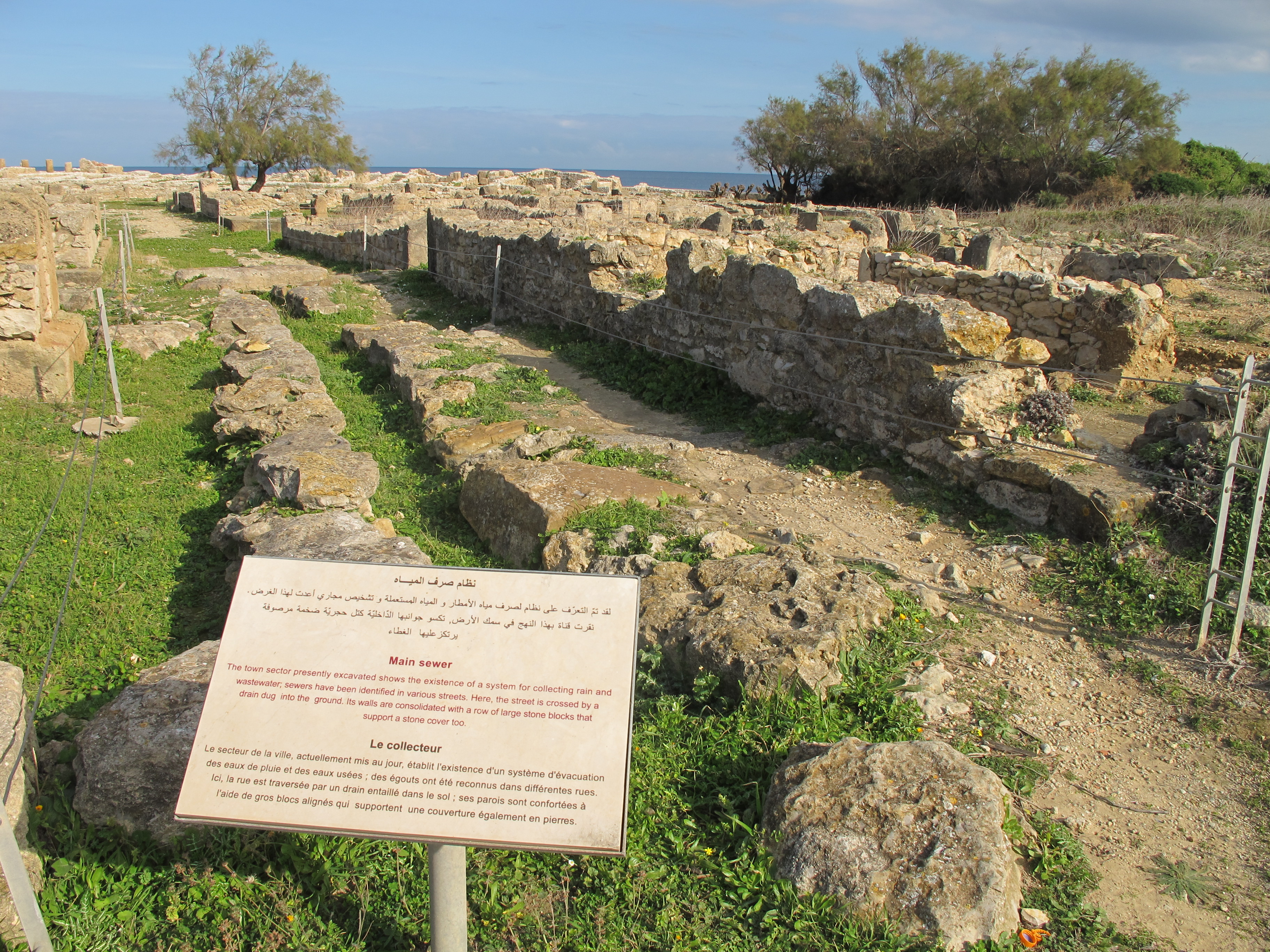
Archeological site of Kerkuane

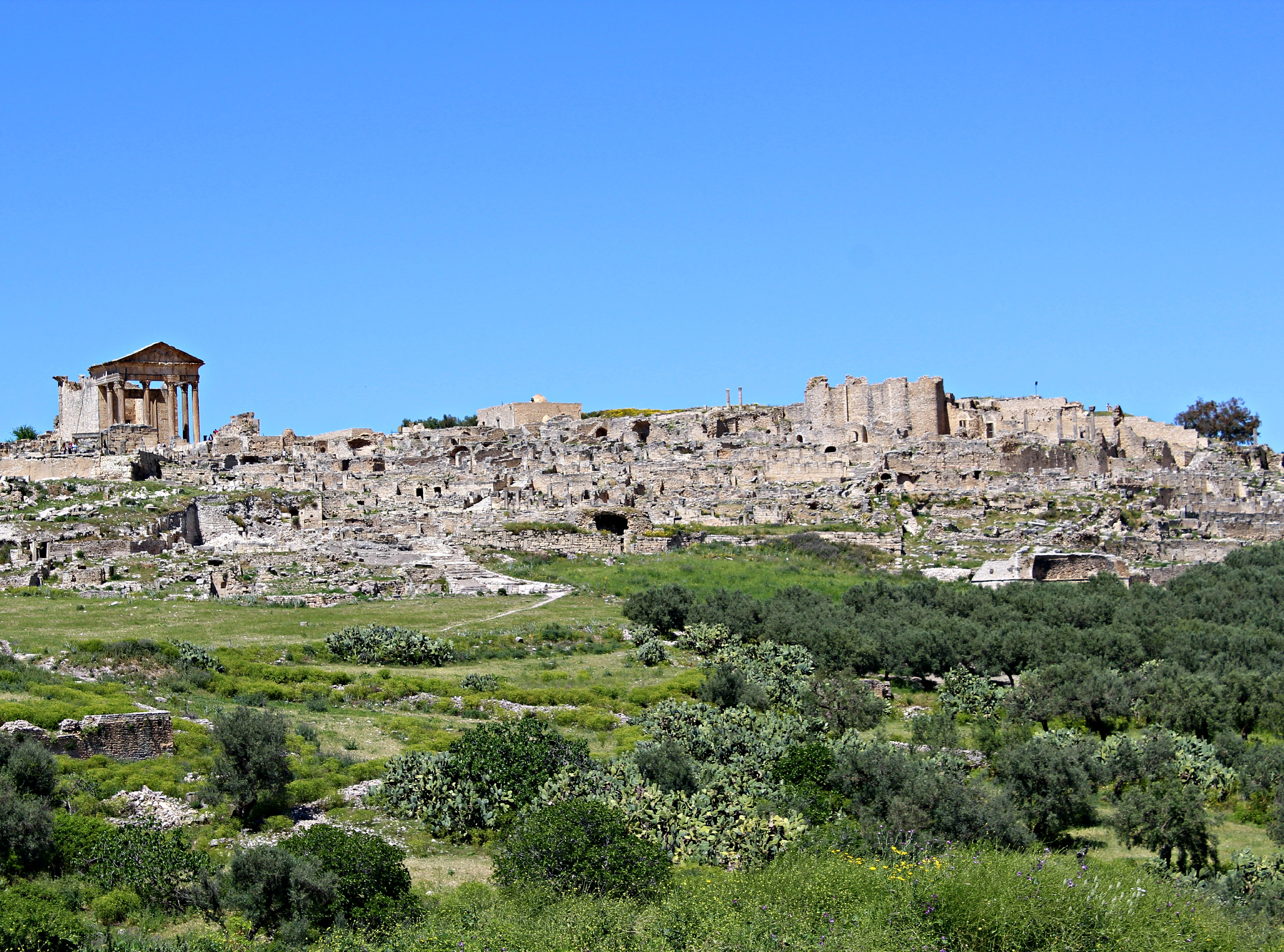
Dougga

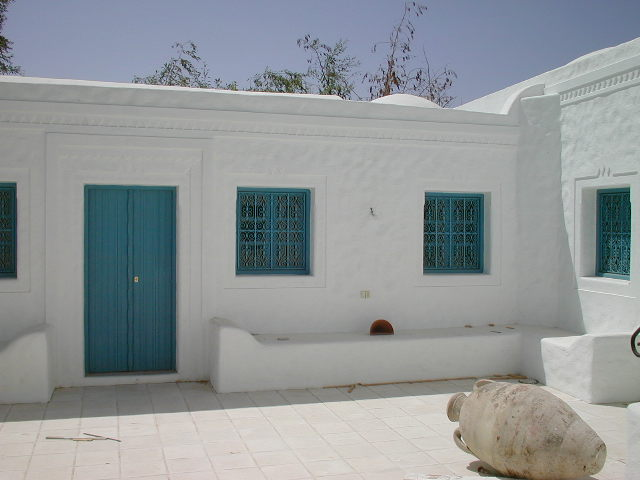
Djerba

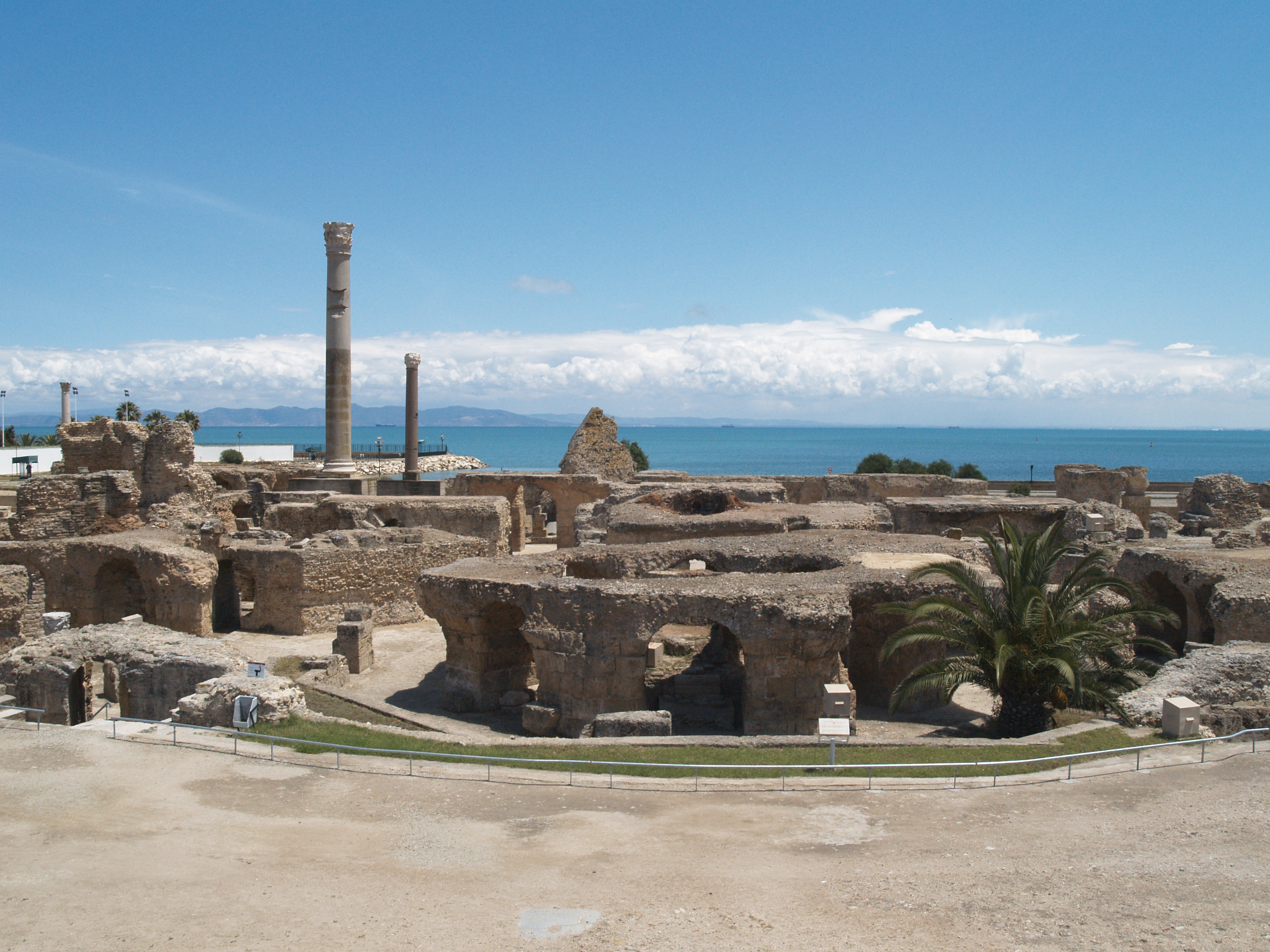
Archeological site of Carthage

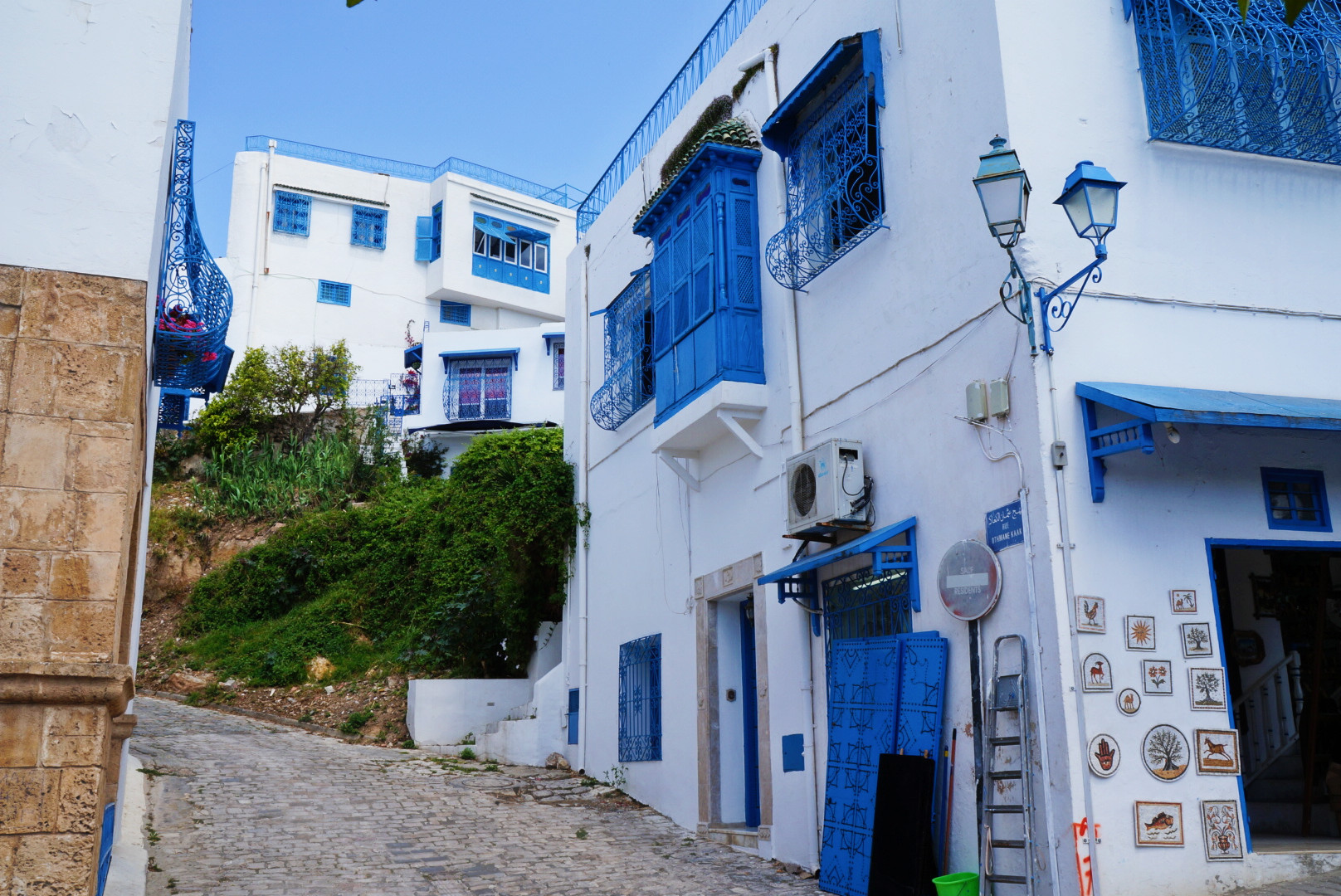
Village of Sidi Bou Said

=== Tentative list ===
- Ancient Quarries of Numidian Marbles in Chemtou
- Archaeological site of Sbeitla
- Bou-Hedma National Park
- Chott el Djerid
- El Feidja National Park
- Frontier of the Roman Empire: South Tunisian Limes
- Gabès Oasis
- Jugurtha Tableland near Kalaat es Senam
- Medina of Sfax
- Permian Marine of Jebel Tebaga
- Rammadiya d'El Magtaa (El Mekta), the reference site of the Capsian culture
- Roman Hydraulic Complex of Zaghouan-Carthage
- Royal Mausolea of Numidia, Mauretania, and Pre-Islamic Funerary Monuments
- Stratotype of the Cretaceous–Tertiary (K-T) Boundary
- Troglodyte Habitat and the World of the Ksour of Southern Tunisia

== Yemen ==
=== World Heritage Sites ===
- Old City of Sana'a
- Landmarks of the Ancient Kingdom of Saba, Marib
- Old Walled City of Shibam
- Socotra Archipelago
- Historic Town of Zabid
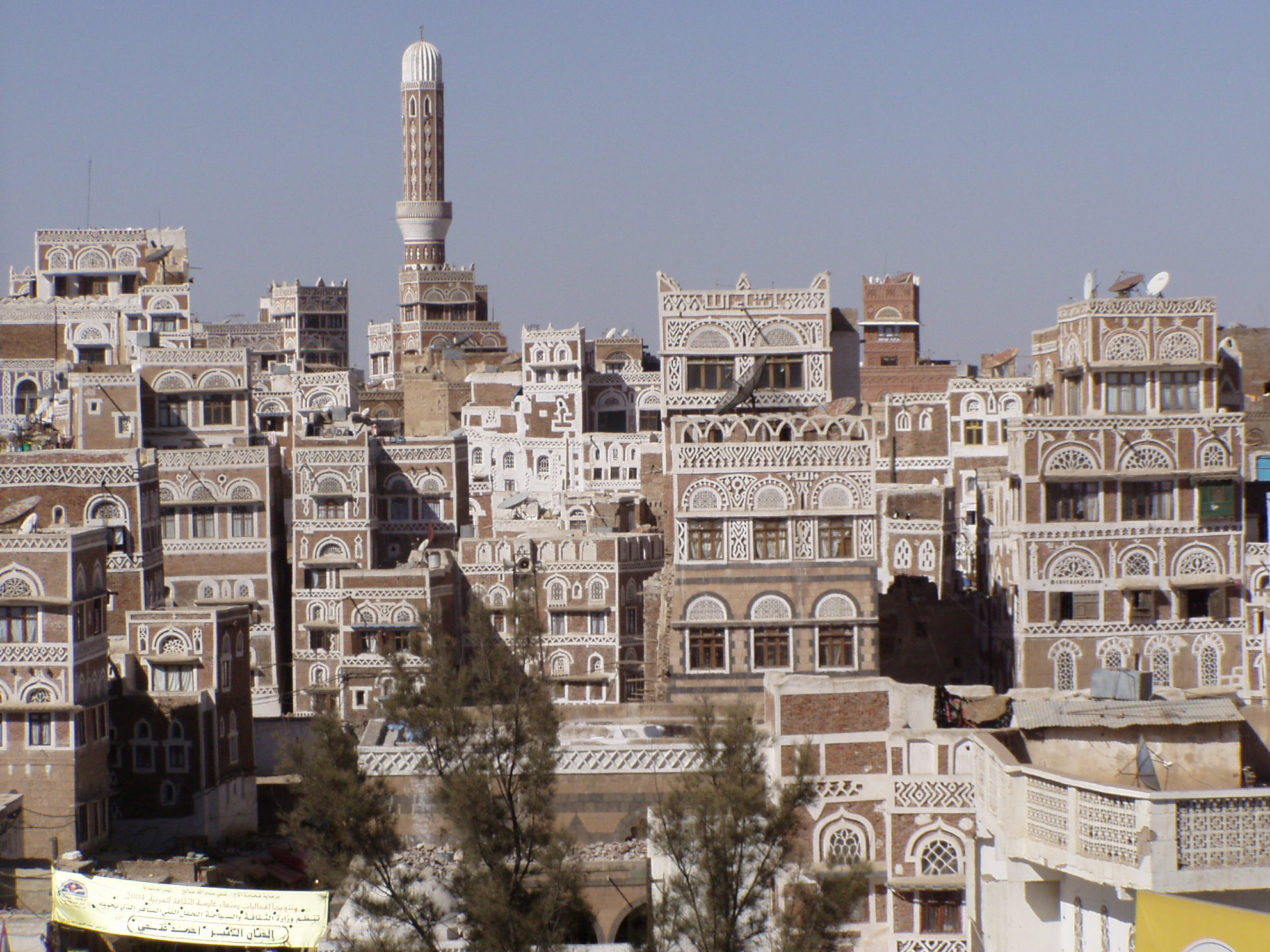
Old City of Sanaa

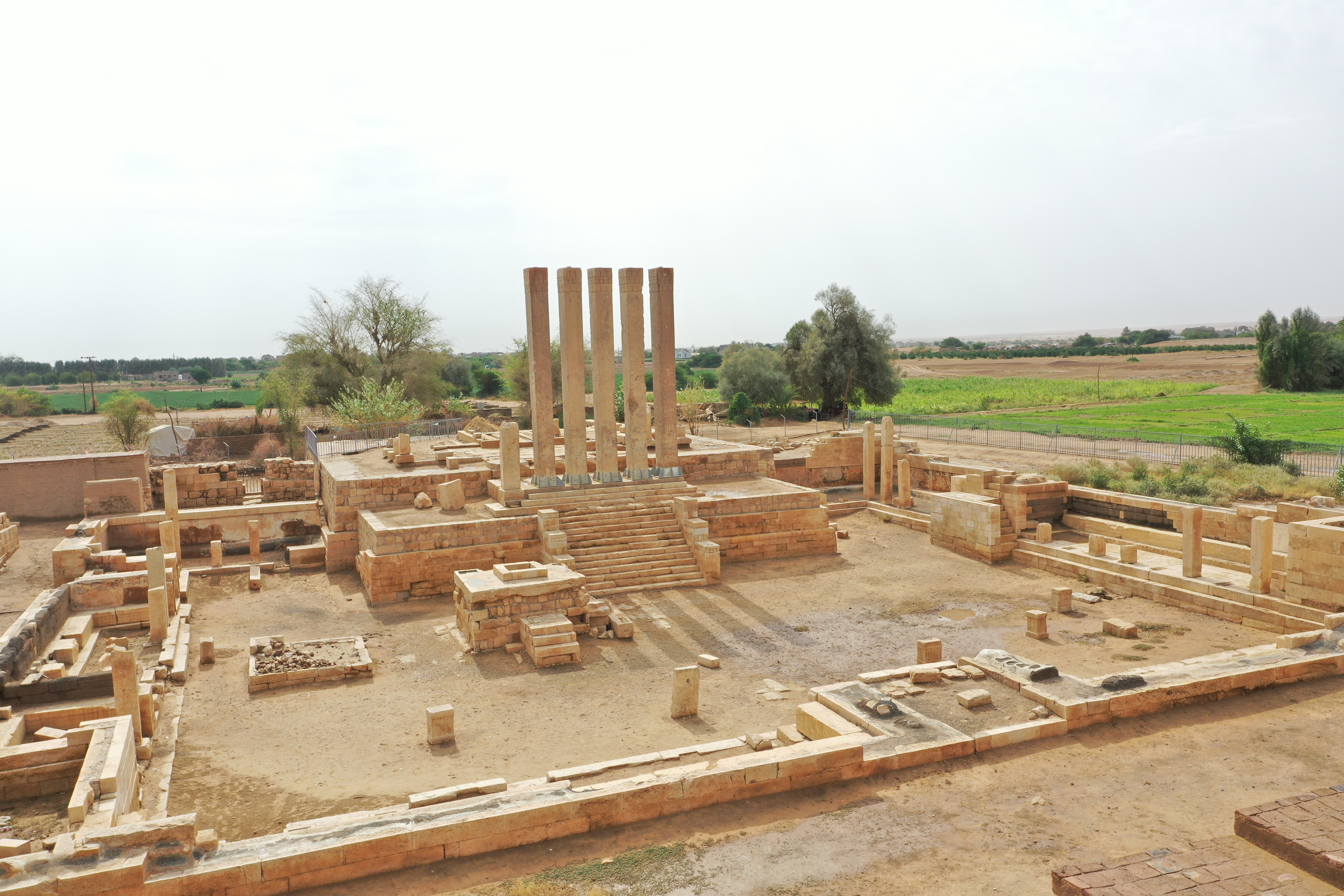
Landmarks of the Ancient Kingdom of Saba, Marib

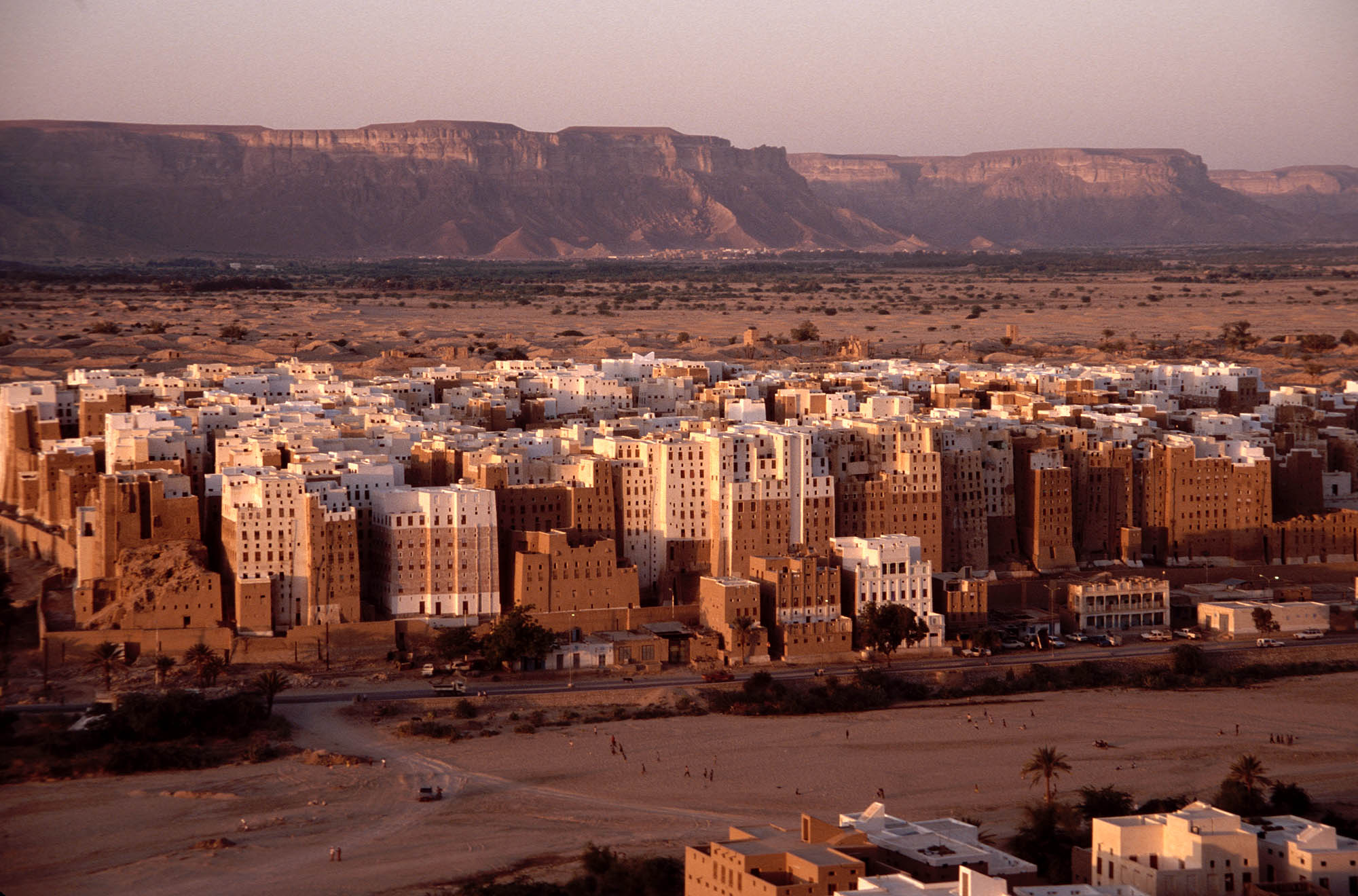
Old Walled City of Shibam

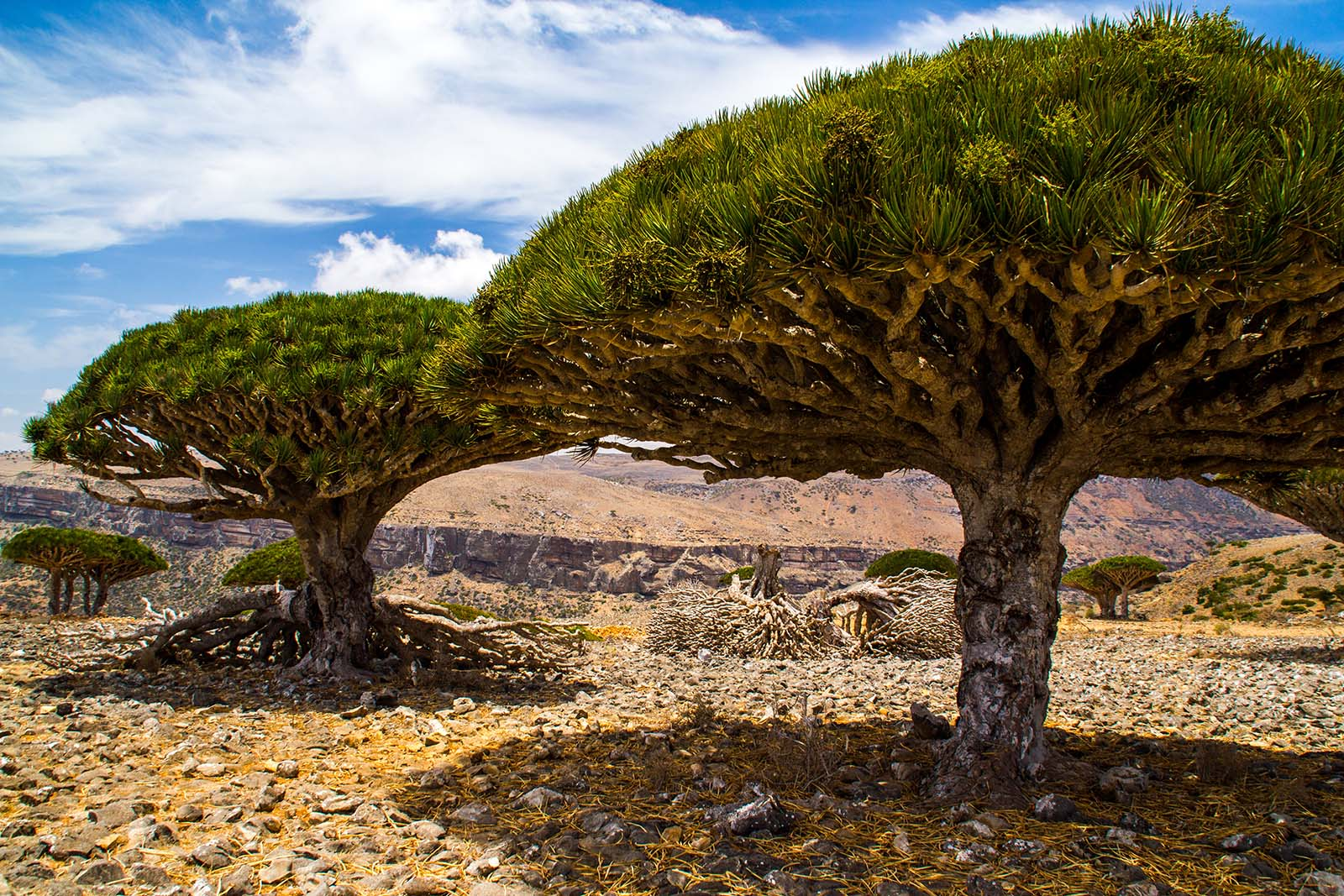
Socotra

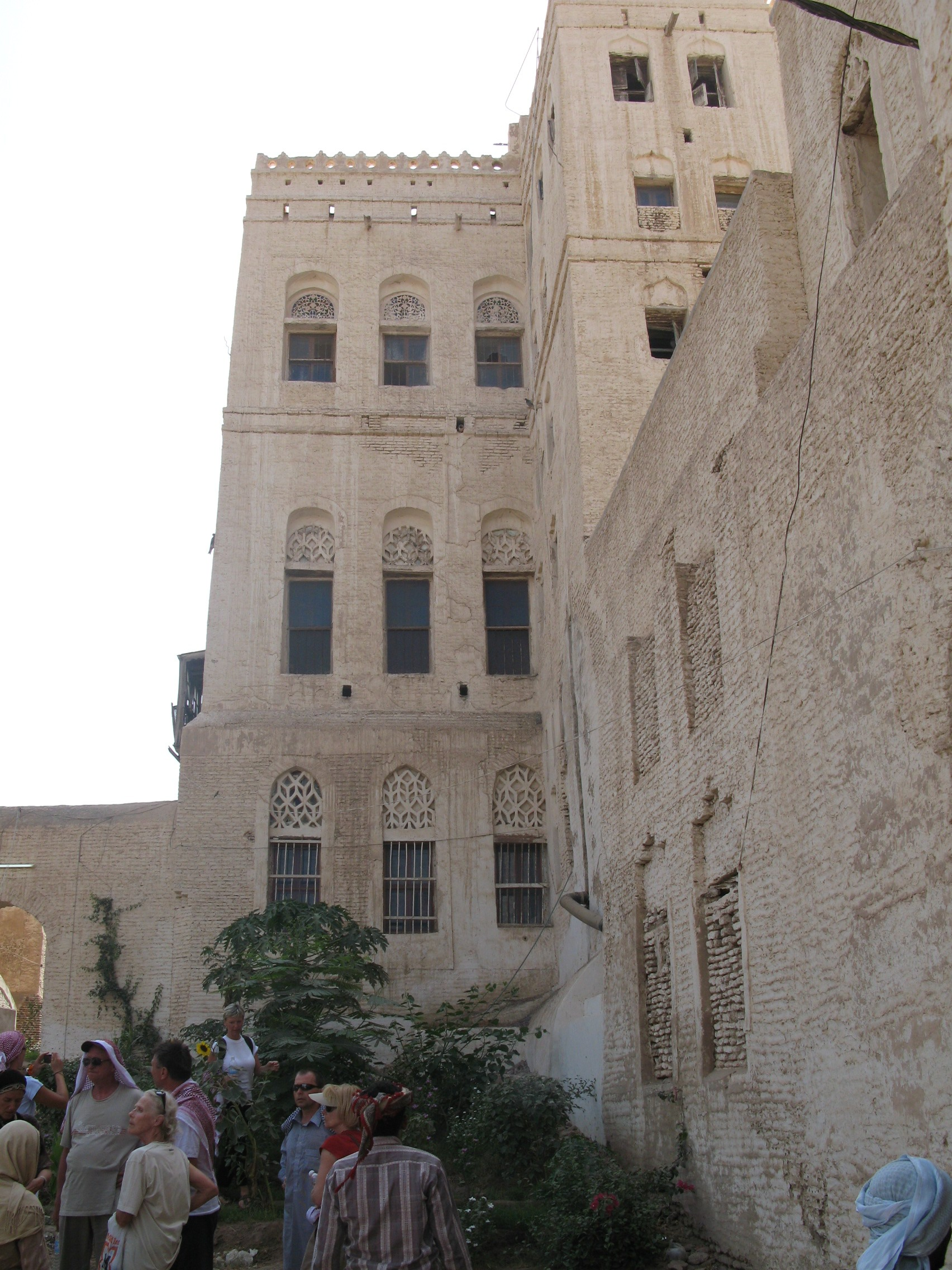
Historic Town of Zabid

=== Tentative list ===
- Al Madrasah Al Amereyyah in Rada'
- Al Mokha City
- Al-Hawtah City
- Al-Qarrah City, Yafe'
- Archaeological Sites of the Kingdom of Qataban in Beyhan
- Balhaf/Burum Natural Reserve
- Barāqish City Archaeological Site
- Dar Al Hajar
- Erf Mountain Natural Reserve
- Biodiversity Sites in Hadramout
- Habban City, Shabwah
- Haid Al-Jazil and Wadi Daw'an, Hadramout
- Historic City of Saada
- Jabal Bura
- Jabal Haraz
- Jiblah city
- Historic City of Al-Mukalla
- Old Incense Trade Routes
- Say'un Palace
- Shibam Kawkaban
- Sites of the Cultural Landscape and Heritage Landmarks in Sana'a
- Tarim City, Hadramout
- Agricultural Terraces in Yemen
- The Archaeological Remains and Water Management Systems Himyar Kingdom in Dhafar
- The Archaeological Sites of the Kingdom of Hadramout in Shabwah
- The Cities and Landmarks of Ma'in Old Kingdom
- The Hawf Area
- The Historic City of Aden
- The Historic City of Thula
- The Historic Fortifications of Hudayyedah
- The Old City of Al-Hudaydah (Ḥārat al-Sūr)
- The landmarks of Ta'iz City
- Shaharah City and its Bridge
- Sharma-Jathmun Protected Area
- Wetland Natural Reserve, Aden

== United Arab Emirates ==
=== World Heritage Sites ===
- Cultural Sites of Al Ain (Hafit, Hili, Bidaa Bint Saud and Oases Areas)
- Faya Palaeolandscape
- Wadi Wurayah National Park
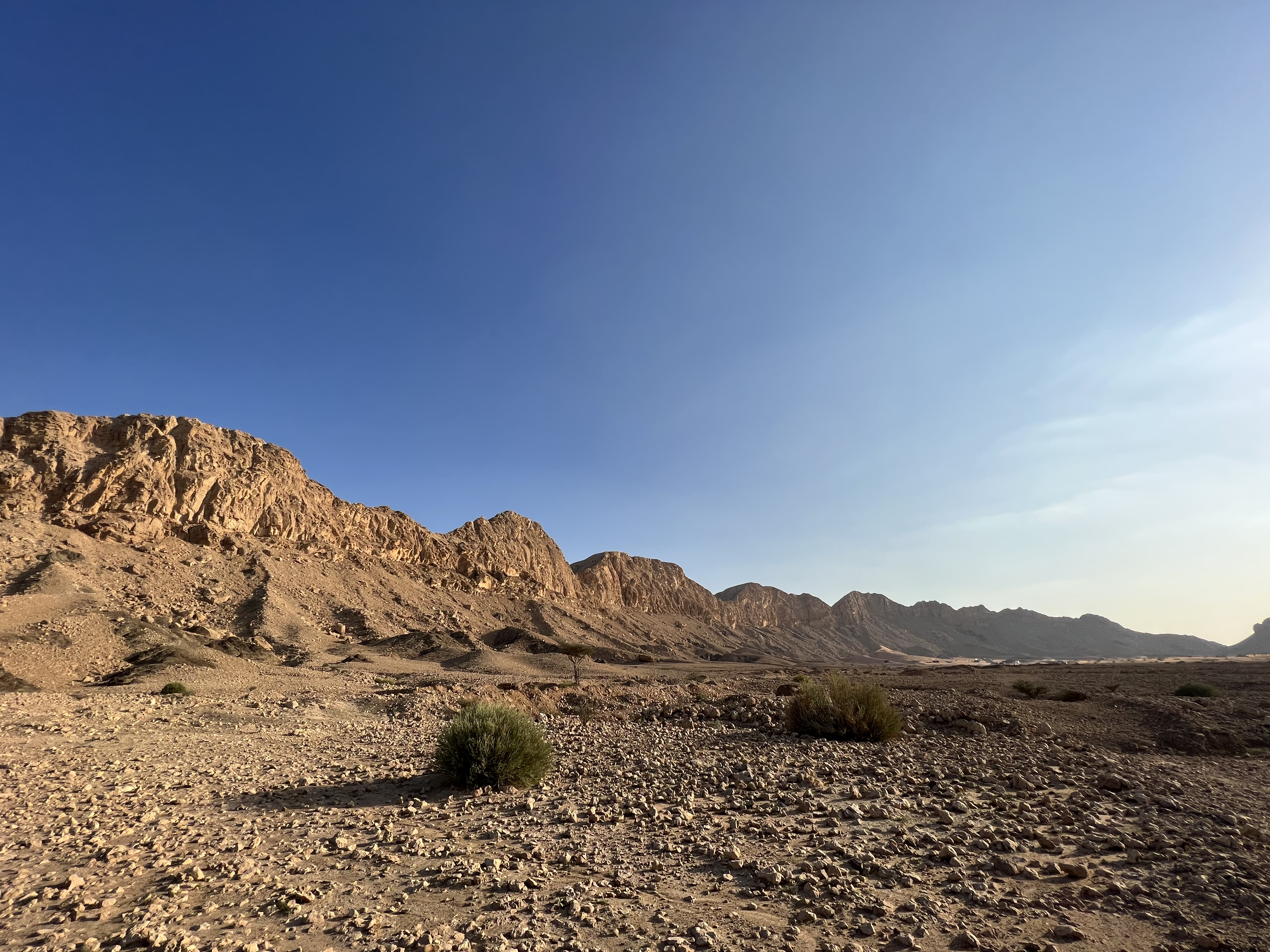
Faya Palaeolandscape

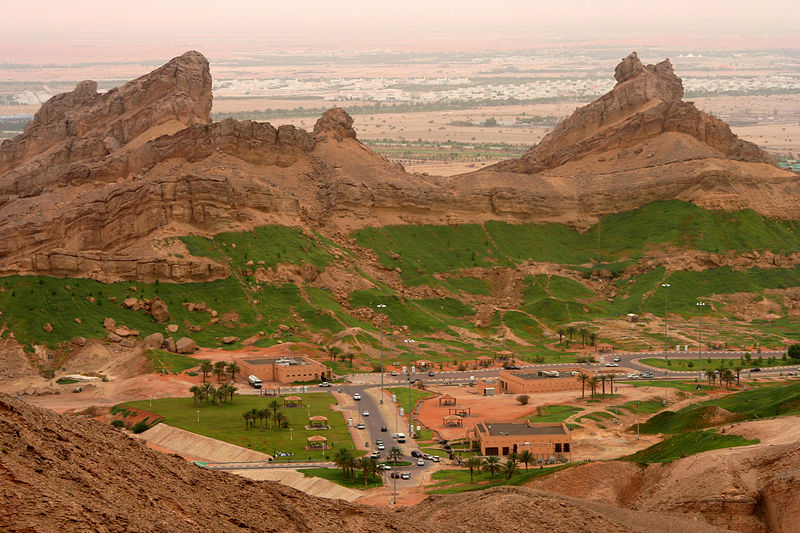
Cultural Sites of Al Ain

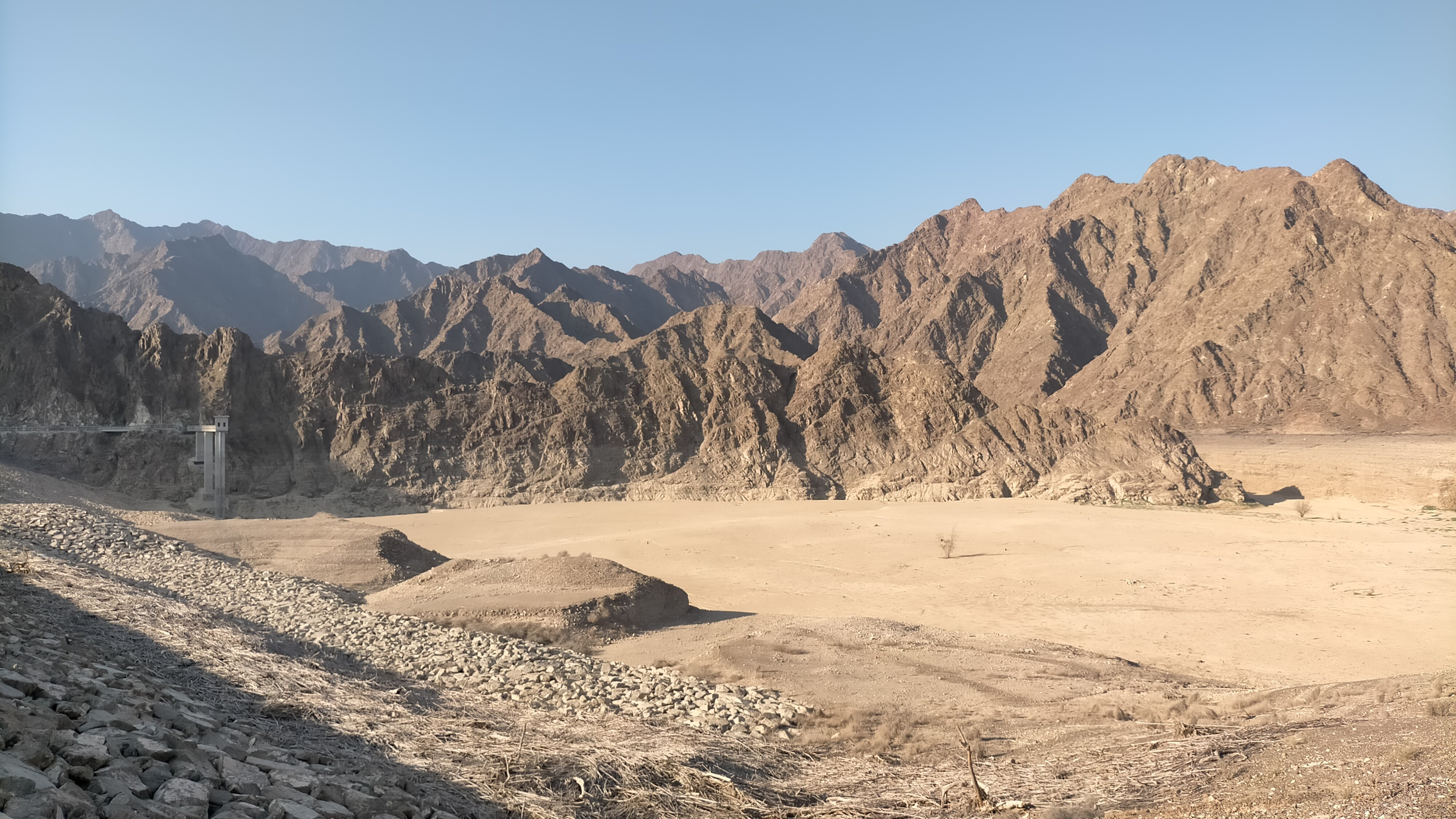
Wadi Wurayah National Park

=== Tentative list ===
- Abu Dhabi – Sabkha
- Al Bidya Mosque
- Ed-Dur Site
- Hatta Archaeological Landscape (Emirate of Dubai)
- Mleiha, Late Pre-Islamic Center of a South-East Arabian Kingdom
- Khor Dubai
- Settlement and Cemetery of Umm an-Nar Island
- Sharjah: the Gate to Trucial States
- Shimal
- Sir Bu Nair Island
- The pearl trading town of Jazirat Al-Hamra
- The Rock Art of the Emirate of Sharjah
- Trading town of Julfar
- Wadi Al Helo: Testimony of Bronze Age Copper Production

== See also ==
- List of World Heritage Sites in Africa
- Destruction of cultural heritage by ISIL
- Destruction of cultural heritage during the Gaza war
