= Economy of pre-Islamic Arabia =

Economy of Arabia before Islam

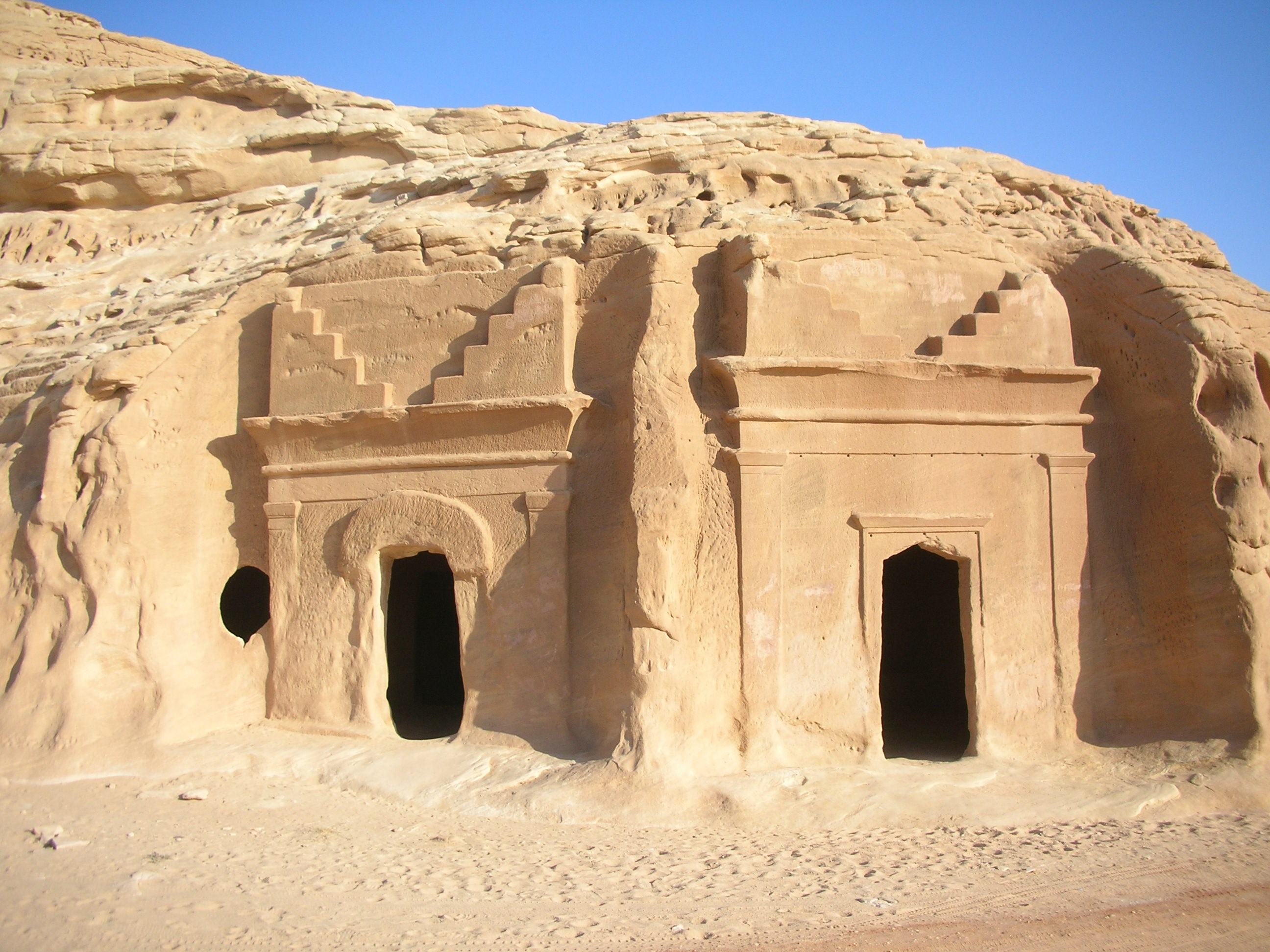
Hegra, a Nabataean oasis settlement on north Arabian trade routes.

The economy of pre-Islamic Arabia comprised the forms of production, subsistence and exchange practiced in the Arabian Peninsula before the rise of Islam in the 7th century CE. It varied sharply by region. In South Arabia and parts of eastern Arabia, agriculture depended on dams, floodwater diversion, terraces, wells and oasis systems. In central Arabia, permanent oasis settlement developed later and was based especially on date palms, cereals, camels, sheep and goats. In northern and western Arabia, oasis towns, pastoral groups, caravan routes and seasonal markets linked local economies with wider networks of exchange. Coastal communities in the Red Sea, Arabian Sea and Persian Gulf also participated in maritime trade with northeast Africa, the Mediterranean, Mesopotamia, Iran and India.

Long-distance trade was important, but it was only one part of Arabian economic life. Local and regional economies also depended on animal husbandry, oasis agriculture, textile production, leatherworking, metalworking, mining and the management of scarce water resources. Archaeological and textual evidence from the centuries immediately before Islam suggests a changing economic geography: some older urban and port networks declined, while parts of central and western Arabia, including Mecca, Najran and other caravan-linked settlements, became more prominent in the exchange taking place in late antique Arabia.

== Geographic position of Arabia ==
The Arabian Peninsula is strategically geographically located between Africa and Asia, with Syria and the Jordan to the north, Iraq (Mesopotamia) and Persia to the east, Egypt and southern Europe (across the Mediterranean Sea) to the north-west, Ethiopia and Somaliland to the west (across the Red Sea). Traversal of the Indian Ocean also provides access to the Indian subcontinent. Beginning in the Early Middle Ages, a substantial amount of world trade was happening between Arabia, Persia, Ethiopia, and the Roman Empire.

== Water management ==
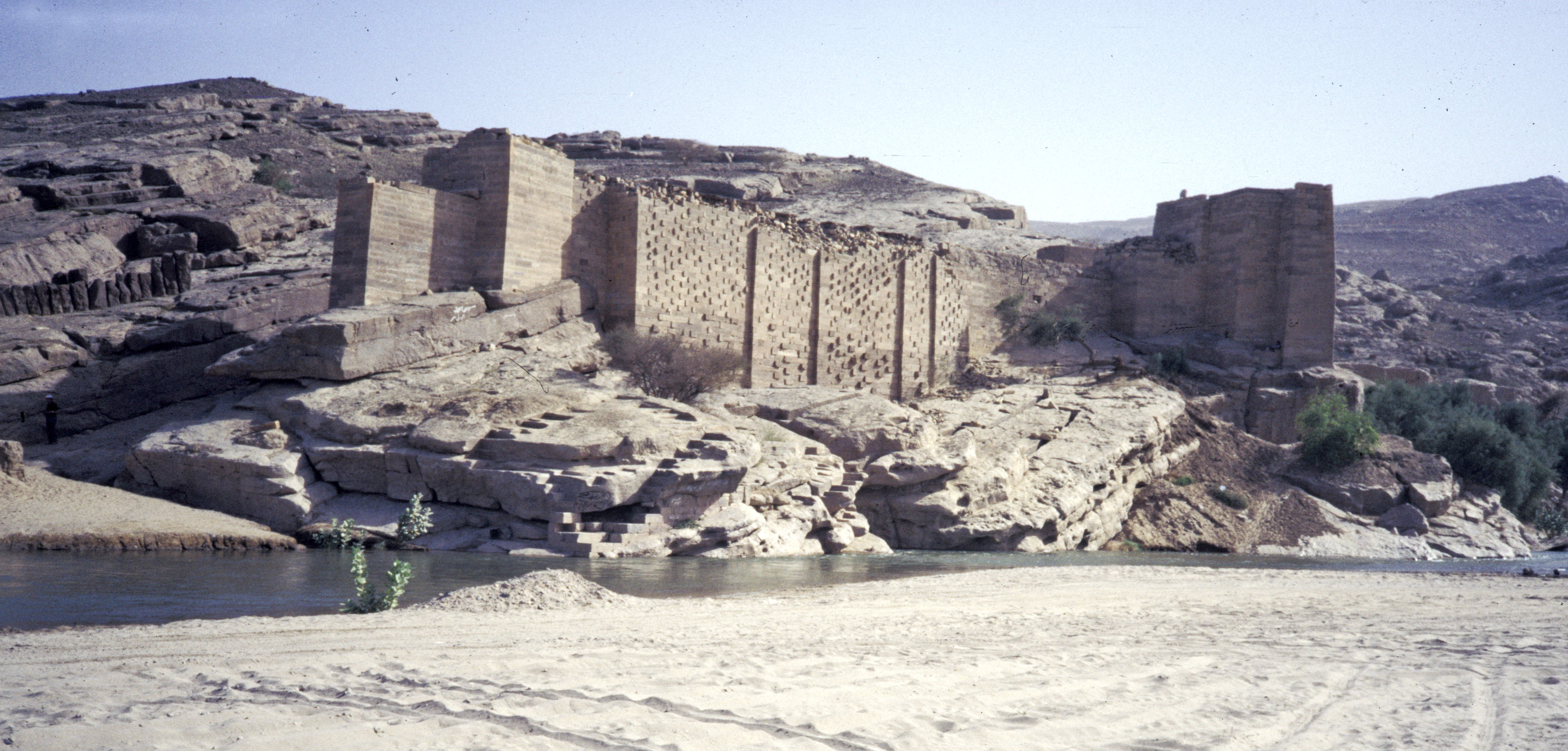
Ruins of the ancient Marib Dam, whose irrigation system supported intensive agriculture in South Arabia.

Arabian economic life was shaped by water. Sedentary settlement in much of the peninsula required access to permanent or seasonal water sources, including groundwater, wadis, springs, runoff, wells and irrigation systems. In southeastern Arabia, Bronze Age oasis settlement was associated with early hydraulic installations, while Iron Age settlement became denser with the spread of underground water channels. In southwestern Arabia, lowland communities harnessed seasonal floods and highland communities built agricultural terraces; over time, larger settlements emerged in zones where ambitious irrigation works could support agriculture. In South Arabia, water management was closely tied to political and social organization. Agricultural terraces and floodwater systems helped sustain sedentary communities, while the construction and maintenance of larger hydraulic works required coordination between local groups. Mouton and Schiettecatte argue that South Arabian settlement patterns were closely connected to irrigation, collective management and the long-term formation of agricultural territories.

The development of oasis agriculture in central Arabia appears to have been later than in eastern and northern Arabia. At al-Yamama in the al-Kharj oasis, archaeobotanical and archaeozoological evidence indicates permanent occupation from the second half of the first millennium BCE. The basic agricultural system there relied on date palms and cereals, especially barley and wheat, alongside sheep, goats and camels. Other central Arabian sites, including Zubayda, al-Uyun and Qaryat al-Faw, show that oasis settlement developed gradually along the Jabal Tuwayq during roughly the fifth to third centuries BCE.

== Agriculture and pastoralism ==
=== Oasis agriculture ===
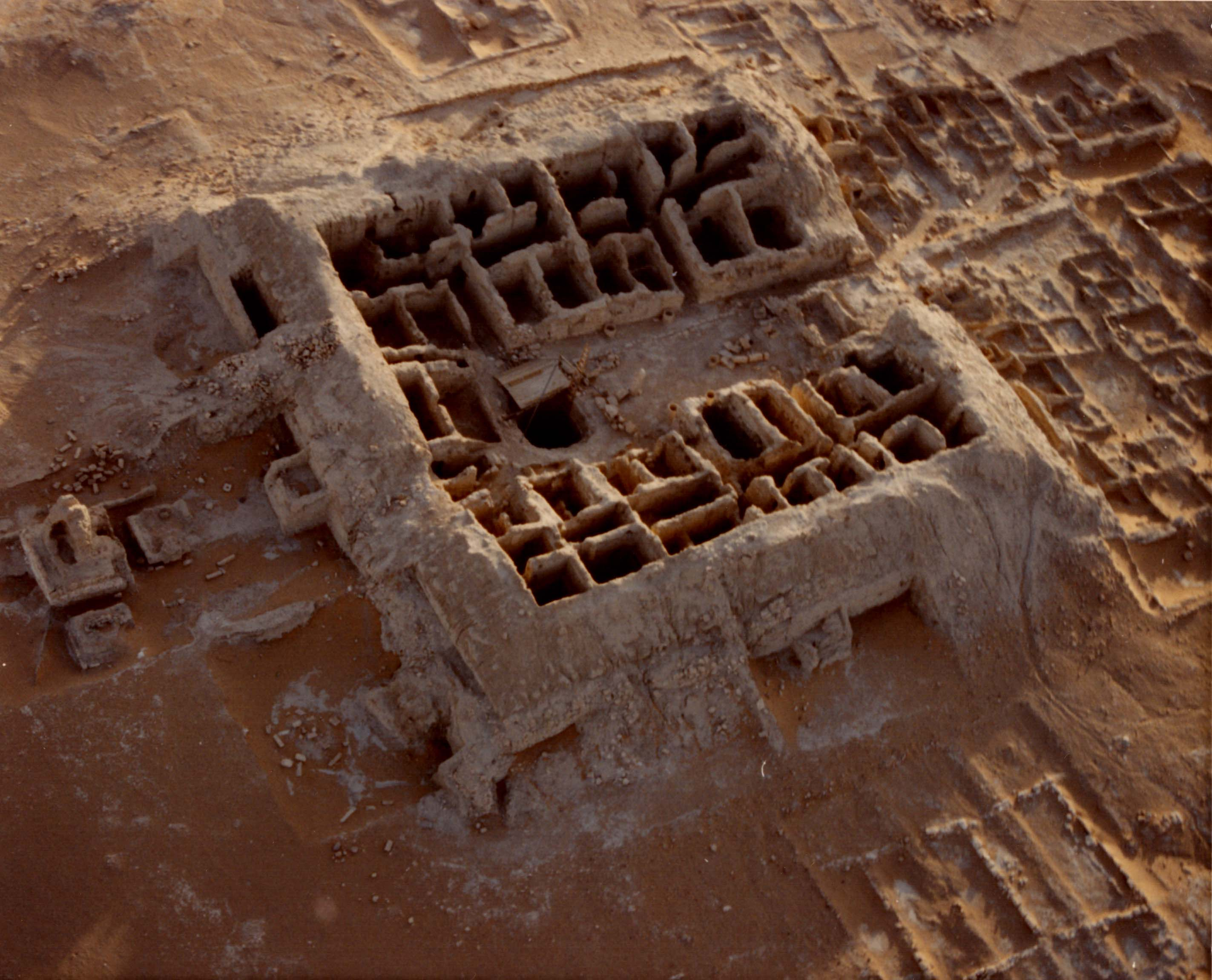
Aerial view of Qaryat al-Faw, a major settlement connected with central Arabian trade.

Oasis agriculture combined water management with the cultivation of date palms, cereals, fruit trees, fodder and garden crops. At Al-Yamama, pre-Islamic botanical evidence is relatively limited but shows the basic components of an oasis agrosystem: date palm, barley and wheat. Qaryat al-Faw appears to have had a more diverse oasis system, with evidence for date palms, cereals, pomegranate, grapevine, olive, sesame and watermelon. This difference may reflect chronology, preservation, or the stronger integration of Qaryat al-Faw into regional and long-distance exchange networks.

In northwest Arabia, Hegra was supported by wells and irrigated land. Archaeobotanical remains from the site include date palm, cereals, pulses, grape, fig, olive and pomegranate, as well as cotton. The excavators connect this assemblage with intensive garden cultivation irrigated from wells.

Some crops also show the extent of Arabia's commercial and agricultural connections. Cotton seeds and textiles from Qal'at al-Bahrain and Hegra indicate that parts of the peninsula were involved in cotton cultivation and textile production during antiquity. Cotton was probably grown in irrigated date-palm gardens and that at least some production may have been intended for trade. Crops and plant foods have been identified as moving through Arabian trade networks, including rice, black pepper and cotton at Mleiha, where some were probably imported through Indian Ocean exchange while others may have been locally grown or processed.

=== Pastoralism ===
Pastoralism remained central to the economy of many Arabian communities. At al-Yamama, sheep, goats and Arabian camels dominate the faunal assemblage. One research team interprets this as a livestock system that provided meat, milk, wool, skin, transport and caravan animals. Hunting also continued, with gazelle, oryx, hare and spiny-tailed lizard among the animals represented.

The camel was especially important for mobility and exchange in arid environments. It supported pastoral life, carried goods and linked oases, towns and markets across long distances. The horse, by contrast, was comparatively rare in pre-Islamic Arabia. It has been argued that horses appear in Arabia only in later contexts, became more firmly established in different regions over time, and remained scarce in late pre-Islamic faunal assemblages, although they had become important as animals of war and status before Islam.

== Craft production and industry ==
=== Textiles ===
Textile production is attested archaeologically in eastern and northwestern Arabia. Cotton remains from Achaemenid-period Qal'at al-Bahrain and from Hegra in the early first millennium CE place the peninsula among the cotton-producing areas of the ancient Middle East. At Hegra, cotton seeds occur in domestic contexts together with food plants and wild plants, and cotton textiles were found in tombs. At Qal'at al-Bahrain, cotton seeds, textile fragments and textile tools point to cultivation and craft production in an island settlement connected to overseas trade.

Textiles also formed part of western Arabian trade. Late antique and early Islamic literary traditions describe Meccan and Hejazi merchants dealing in cloth, leather and other locally available commodities. These traditions are difficult to use as straightforward economic records, but they show that the economy of western Arabia was not imagined solely in terms of aromatics or exotic luxuries.

=== Leatherworking ===
Leatherworking was a major craft in pastoral and urban contexts. Ghabin notes that animal hides were abundant because of camel, cattle, sheep and goat husbandry, and that leather was needed for tents, basins, buckets, saddles, water skins, belts, sandals, cushions, writing materials and other everyday objects. He also identifies Mecca, Yathrib and Ta'if among the places associated in the sources with tanning and leather production.

The scale and destination of the Meccan leather trade remain debated. Patricia Crone argued that Quraysh may have supplied leather and pastoral products to the Roman army, while treating this as a hypothesis rather than a demonstrable fact. Heck, by contrast, emphasizes a broader Hejazi economy in which leather goods, cloth, foodstuffs, perfumes and metals could circulate through regional and interregional trade.

=== Metals and mining ===
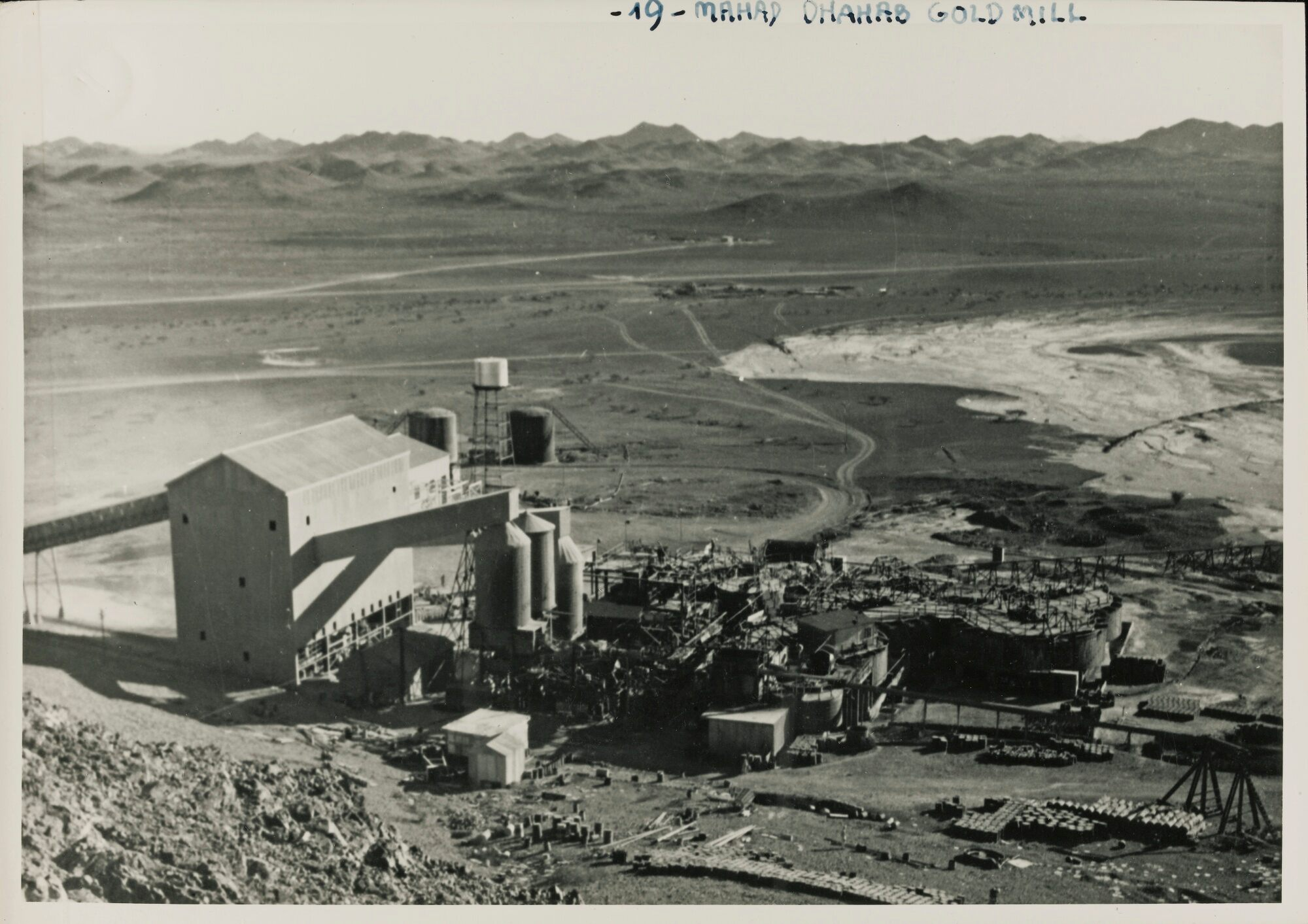
Mahd adh-Dhahab, later known as a gold-mining area in western Arabia.

Western Arabia had deposits of gold, silver, copper and other metals. The chronology and scale of mining before Islam are difficult to reconstruct, but early Islamic literary and archaeological evidence points to the importance of mining districts in the Hejaz, Najd, Yemen and Oman. Heck argues that precious metals helped support western Arabian commerce in the formative Islamic period, while Morony treats the early Islamic mining boom as an expansion that began at the end of Late Antiquity and became more visible in the early Islamic centuries.

Mining should therefore be treated cautiously for the pre-Islamic period. The evidence is strongest for the late antique and early Islamic transition rather than for a fully documented pre-Islamic industry. Nevertheless, the later boom drew on mineral zones and technical practices that were not created from nothing in the Islamic period.

== Trade and exchange ==
=== South Arabia and aromatics ===
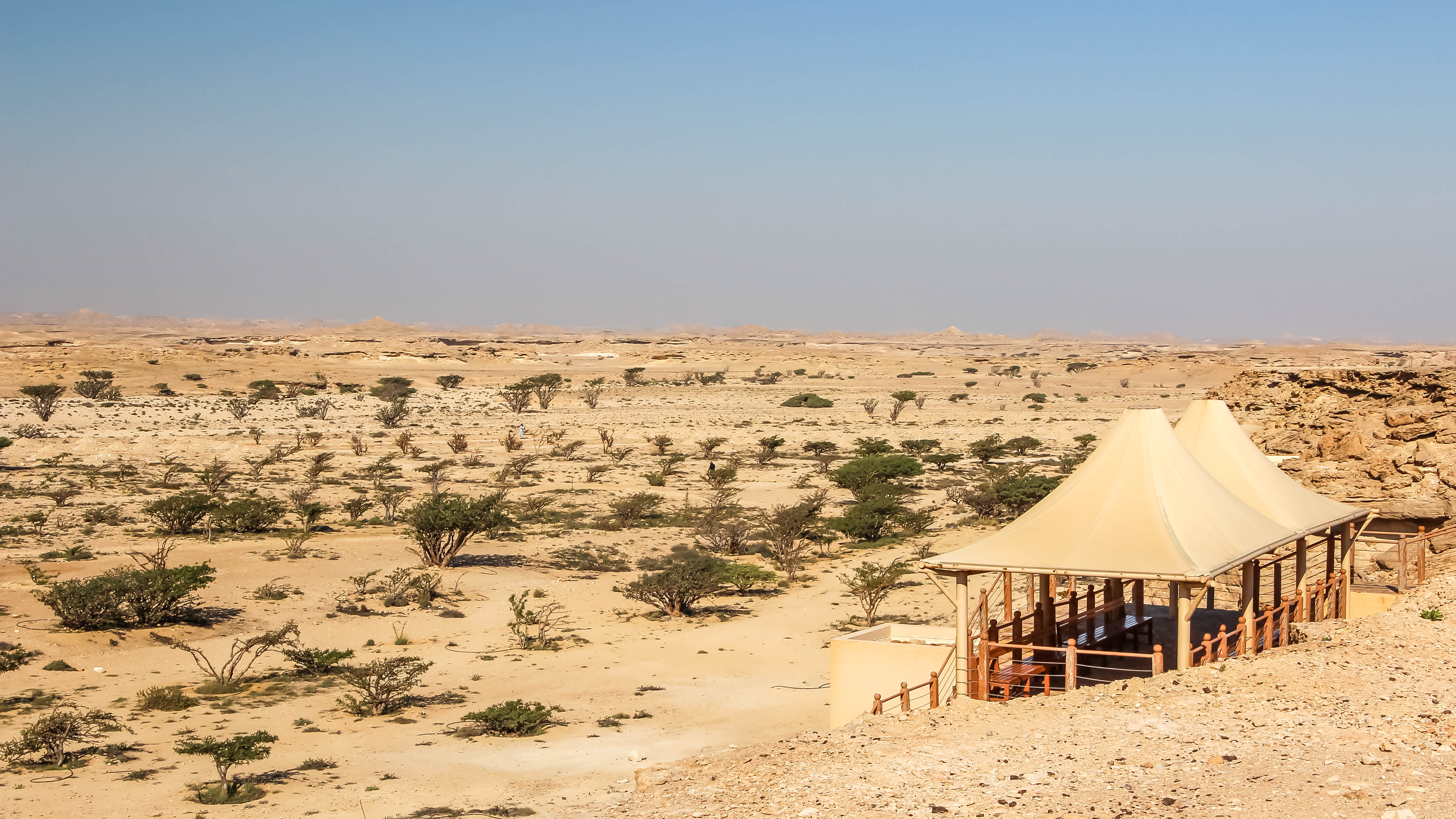
Frankincense trees at Wadi Dawkah in Dhofar, part of the ancient aromatics economy of southern Arabia.

South Arabia was famous in antiquity for aromatics, especially frankincense and myrrh. Earlier South Arabian kingdoms benefited from caravan trade, but this system changed substantially over time. By the first centuries CE, economic activity increasingly centered on ports such as Qani', Muza and later Aden, and the main South Arabian powers sought to control long-distance commerce, including the aromatic trade.

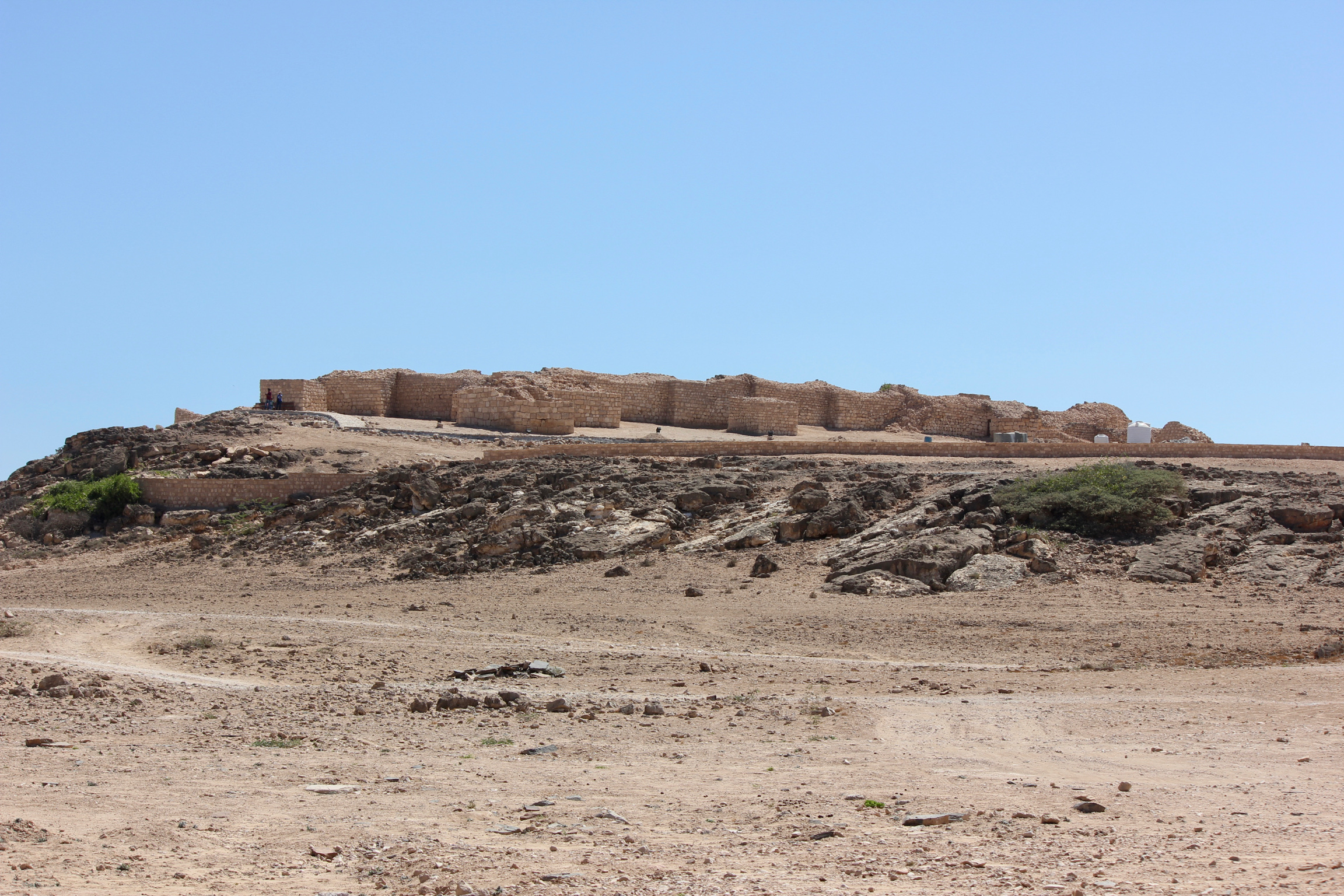
Khor Rori in Oman, identified with ancient Sumhuram, a port associated with the frankincense trade.

The shift from caravan routes to maritime routes was gradual rather than instantaneous. Jeremie Schiettecatte has argued that the maritime alternative developed progressively from the third century BCE and that by the early centuries CE maritime commerce had largely overtaken the older trans-Arabian caravan system for many long-distance exchanges. South Arabian ports connected the peninsula with Egypt, the Horn of Africa, India, the Persian Gulf and the western Indian Ocean.

=== Maritime trade ===
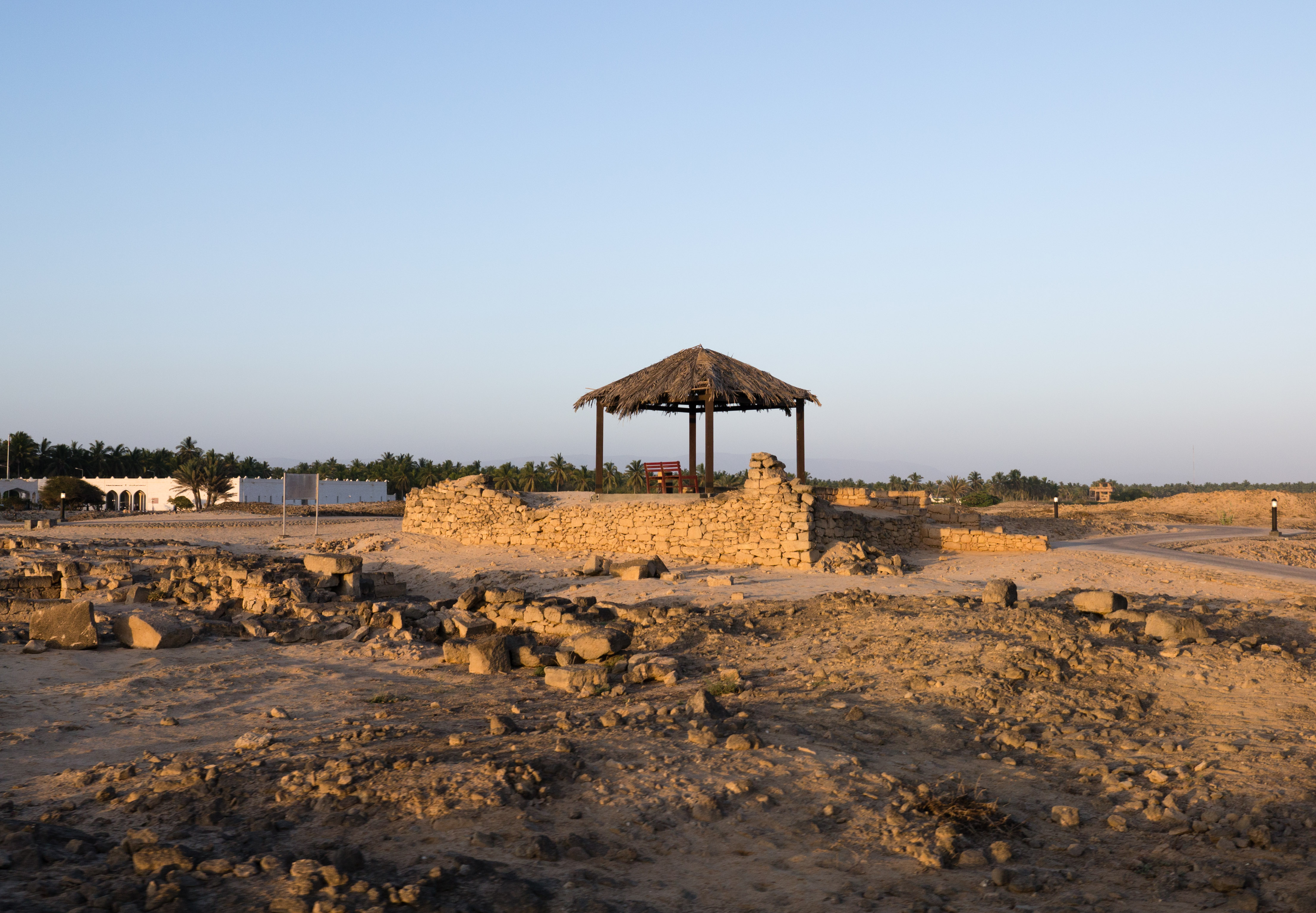
Al-Baleed near Salalah, one of the coastal sites connected with the later Indian Ocean and incense trade.

The main corridors of exchange that faceted the maritime trade of pre-Islamic Arabia were set by the Peninsula's geographic position: to the west is the Red Sea that separates it from Egypt, as well as Ethiopia and the rest of the Horn of Africa, and to the east is the Persian Gulf that separates it from Persia. Long-distance trade routes with India involved the traversal of the Indian Ocean. Trade with Mesopotamia, India, and Egypt through maritime routes is already documented in the 3rd millennium BC. In Greco-Roman times, dedicated writings explained the navigation of maritime trade with the Arabian Peninsula, like the Periplus of the Erythraean Sea ("The circumnavigation of the Red Sea"), and sections of the Geography of Strabo and the Natural History of Pliny the Elder.

The south Arabian navigation history were suggested by Gus van Beek that they are developed through their constant contacts with advanced maritime civilization. According to biblical historiographical research by Charles Henry Stanley Davis, a semitic maritime civilization named Phoenicia which dated from 1100 and 200 BC has long time planted colonies of merchants in Yemen. The prosperity of Gerrhan caused the Yemen and the Phoenician in the opening of Indian route commerce. The Phoenician colonies in Yemen has shipped merchant vessels came from India unloaded their cargoes in Yemen coasts and carried them across the Arabian desert to their hometown in Levant. The Phoenician merchants also settled in Persian gulf in their effort of transporting commodities from India to their hometown. Thus the trade activities between the local Yemenites and the Phoenician has formed a prosper ancient Arab kingdom, Gerrha. The commodities which brought by the Phoenician from Yemen and Persian gulf were transported with Arabian caravan crossing the desert towards Levant.

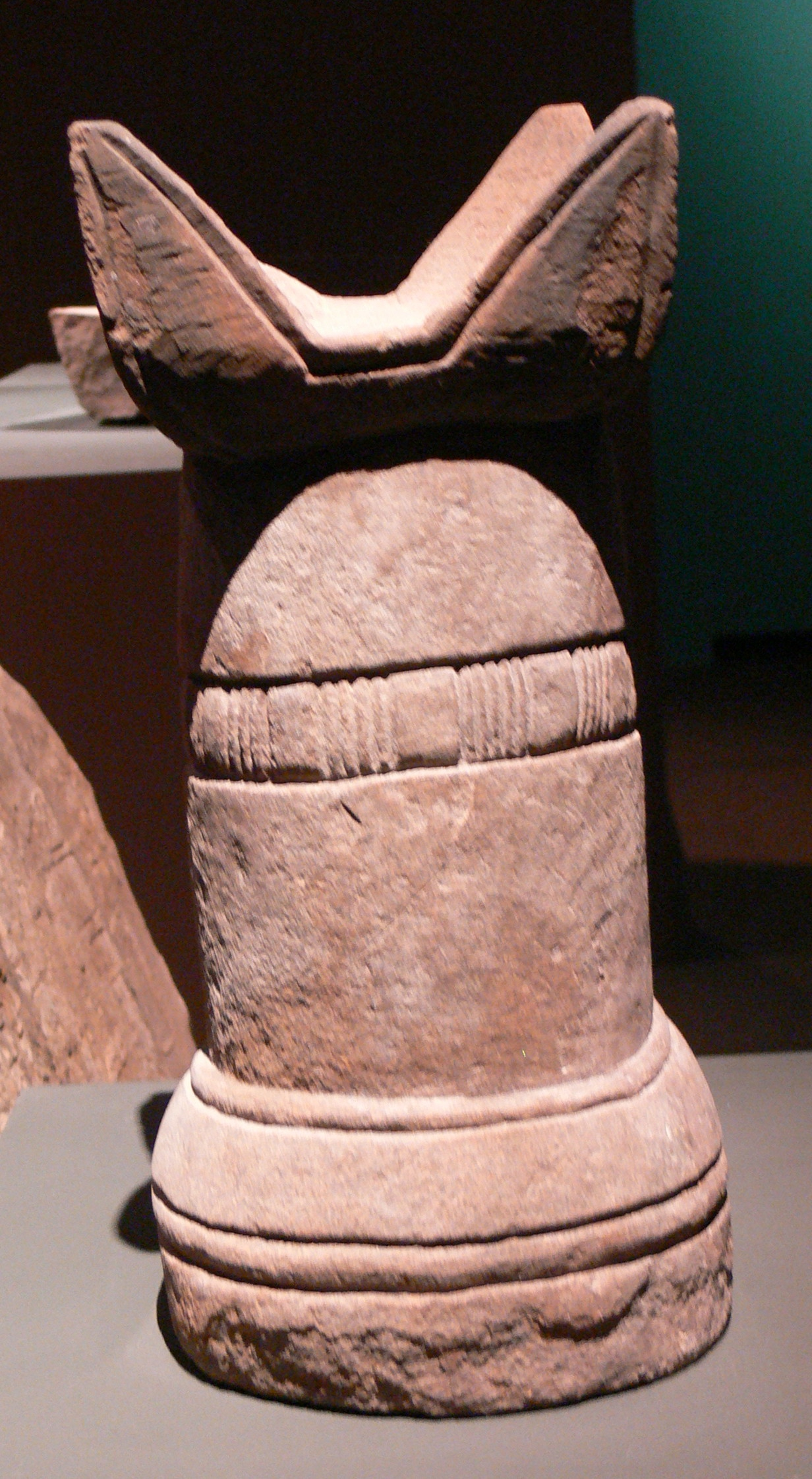
An incense burner from Tayma, reflecting the ritual and commercial importance of aromatics.

Arab naval trade was contested by the Greeks, who tried to challenge Arab control of maritime trade between India and Egypt during the early Middle Ages. Arab trade persisted during the period, and Greek naval trade dwindled. There were a number of harbors on the Arabian Peninsula, some of which remain in operation. The most important harbors in the eastern Arabian Peninsula were Al-Ubulla, Gerrha and Sohar (Oman). The most important southern harbors were Mocha, Qanī (now Bi'r `Ali, Yemen), Aden, and Muska (Samharam). The most important western ports included al-Sha'ibah, Aylah (Aqaba) and Luwikat Kuma (al-Hawra'). A sea route used by Arabs to reach the Indian subcontinent ran from "The Euphrates of Maysan" to Debal on the Indus River. They would also sail from al-Ubulla, passing Oman and on to India. Those who traveled from the harbors of Yemen, such as the Qanī and "Muza" of Gerrha, would sail directly to India without needing to stop and resupply.

=== Land and caravan trade ===
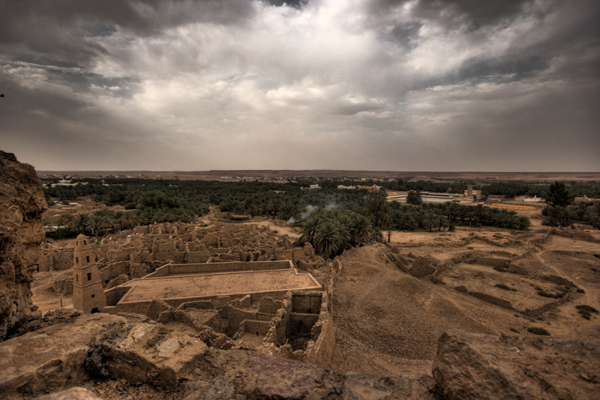
Dumat al-Jandal, ancient Adummatu, an oasis settlement in northern Arabia.

Christian J. Robin argues that a resurgence of long-distance caravan commerce seems took place in Najran and Al-Hira around the middle of the fourth or fifth century, and that a later contraction of Red Sea maritime exchange after the 560s helped create a context in which Mecca could become an intermediary between Africa, South Arabia, India and the Mediterranean. He stresses that Mecca was not alone: Najran also remained an important caravan center.

The Meccan economy has been a subject of debate. Earlier views often treated Mecca as a center of luxury trade in spices and aromatics, while Patricia Crone sharply questioned the scale and nature of Meccan commerce. Later scholars have tended to treat Meccan trade more cautiously: the evidence supports commercial activity, but not necessarily the older picture of a city made wealthy mainly by controlling a trans-Arabian spice route.

=== Destinations of international trade ===
==== With Mesopotamia ====
A text from the era of Sargon of Akkad (r. c. 2334–2284 BCE) mentions a shipping industry in Magan, in present-day Oman.

==== With the Levant ====
Trade between Arabia and the Levant may stretch back as early as the 10th century BC, when a Sabaic inscription was found in Jerusalem, with an exchange of Jewish artifacts also documented in the next centuries.

Muhammad's mercantile career is mentioned in Islamic tradition, and Christian sources from early Islamic times say that Muhammad "would go to [the] lands of Palestine, Arabia, Syria, and Phoenicia to trade."

==== With India ====
Arabian trade and commerce reached the Indus Valley. Excavations in the cities of Ur and Kish and in Bahrain and other locations along the east coast of the Arabian Peninsula have unearthed goods of Indian origin (including seals). Both indicate that the network of maritime trade was regular, bustling, and well known as early as 3000 BC. They suggest that Bahrain and other sites along the Persian Gulf were popular docks which would welcome ships arriving from Iraq on their way to and from India.

== Trade by kingdom and region ==
=== Dilmun ===
During the Bronze Age, most of Eastern Arabia was part of the land of Dilmun, including modern-day Kuwait, Bahrain, Qatar and the adjacent coast of Saudi Arabia. Its capital was located in Bahrain. Dilmun is the earliest recorded civilization from Eastern Arabia, mentioned in written records in the 3rd millennium BCE, with archaeological evidence indicating activity from the fourth to first millennia BCE, its importance faltering after 1800. Dilmun is regarded as one of the oldest ancient civilizations in the Middle East in general.

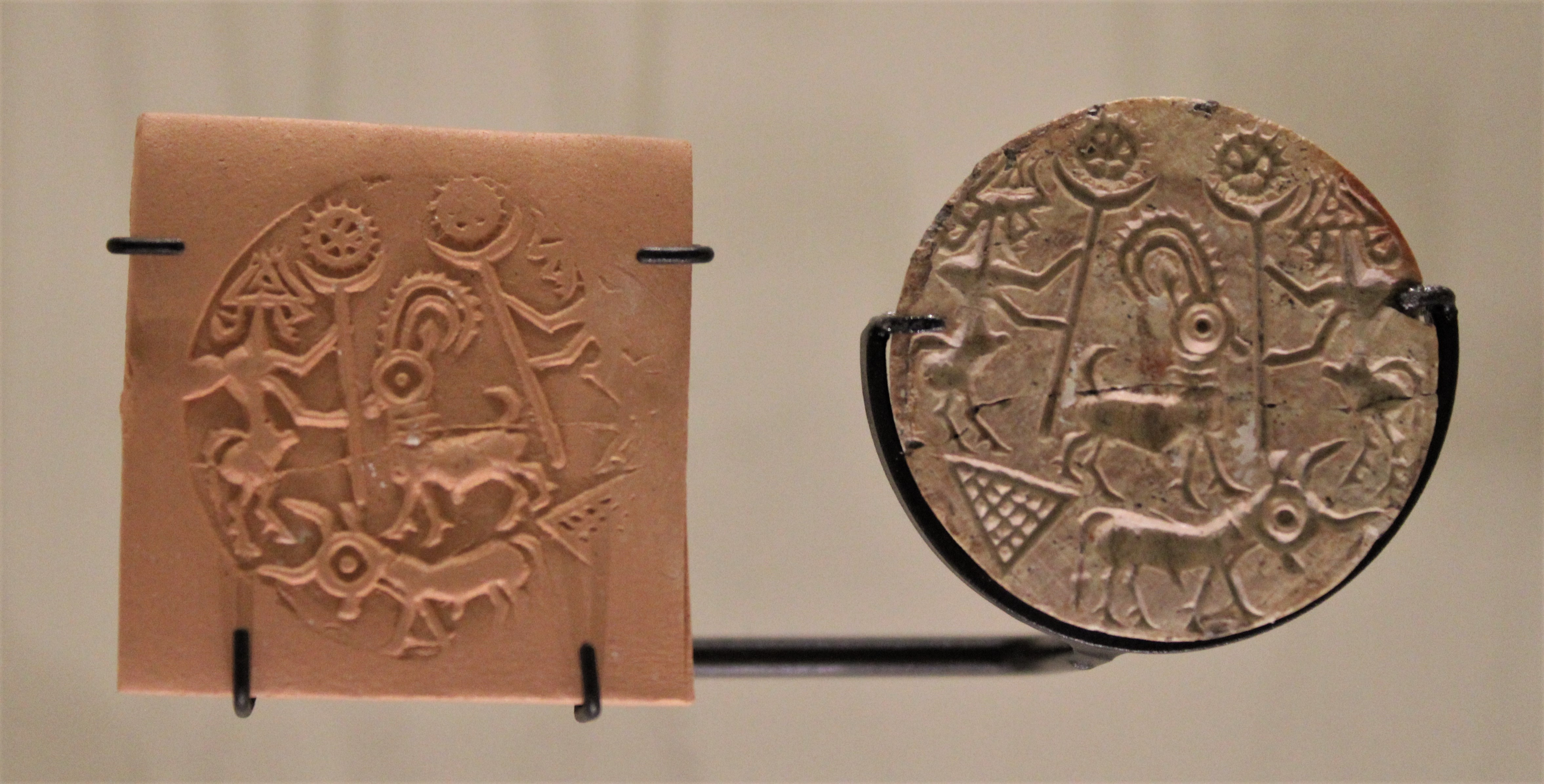
Chlorite seal found in Madinat Hamad belonging to the material culture of Dilmun dated between 2000-1800 BCE

The Dilmun civilization was an important trading center which at the height of its power controlled the Persian Gulf trading routes. This was enabled by a number of natural advantages to the region, and part of this was its abundant underground water supplies and easy anchorages for ships. It became a center for long-distance trade and all types of commodities passed through it (trade extending to areas as far as the Indus Valley), including a variety of exotic goods. As a result, Dilmun became legendary in Mesopotamian literature. The Sumerians regarded Dilmun as holy land. The Sumerians described Dilmun as a paradise garden in the Epic of Gilgamesh. The Sumerian tale of the garden paradise of Dilmun may have been an inspiration for the Garden of Eden story. Dilmun, sometimes described as "the place where the sun rises" and "the Land of the Living", is the scene of some versions of the Eridu Genesis, and the place where the deified Sumerian hero of the flood, Utnapishtim (Ziusudra), was taken by the gods to live forever. Thorkild Jacobsen's translation of the Eridu Genesis calls it "Mount Dilmun" which he locates as a "faraway, half-mythical place".

=== Sabaean kingdom ===
The Sabaeans had a long history of seafaring and commerce. A Sabaean presence in Africa was noted in antiquity with the founding of the kingdom of Dʿmt in Ethiopia in the 8th century BCE. The 1st-century CE historian Periplus of the Erythraean Sea described how the Arabs controlled the coast of "Ezana" (the East African coast north of Somalia). The Quran mentions trade with Sheba: "And We placed between them and the cities which We had blessed [many] visible cities. And We determined between them the [distances of] journey, [saying], "Travel between them by night or day in safety." The Old Testament Book of Ezekiel reads, "Dedan traded in saddle blankets with you. Arabia and all the princes of Kedar were your customers; they did business with you in lambs, rams and goats. ‘The merchants of Sheba and Raamah traded with you; for your merchandise they exchanged the finest of all kinds of spices and precious stones, and gold." The Chinese explorer Faxian, who passed through Sri Lanka in 414 CE, reported that Saebaean merchants and Arabs from Oman and Hadhramaut lived in ornate homes in settlements on the island and traded in timber.

=== Nabataean kingdom ===
According to the 2nd-century BCE Greek historian Agatharchides, "It does not appear that there exists a people richer than the Sabaeans and the people of Gerrha who were agents of everything which fell under the name of shipping between Asia and Europe. They made Ptolemaic Syria rich and made Phoenician trade profitable in addition to hundreds of other things." He described them as fierce warriors and skilled seafarers, who sailed large ships to supply their colonies. The Palmyrene Empire built a shipyard in Characene, which facilitated the transport of goods through the Euphrates ports of Dura-Europos and Sura (the present-day village of Al-Hamam, east of the al-Thawra Dam in Syria). Some of the Palmyrenes who owned and sailed ships on the Persian Gulf and the Indian Ocean were attested by Chinese sailors who visited the region in 97 CE and mentioned the Characene port of Charax Spasinu. Characene surpassed Gerrha in the perfume trade. Despite the lack of direct control by the Nabataean Kingdom in the Persian Gulf, it was reachable by land (where goods would be loaded onto ships). Nabataean writings and manufactured goods (including typical Nabataean white dyes) have been discovered in the village of Thaj near the Persian Gulf, along the eastern coast of the Arabian Peninsula near Bahrain and as far as the ports of Yemen and Oman. They have also been found in archeological sites along the Incense Route, such as Qaryat al-Faw. Nabataean pottery has been uncovered in India; Nabataean inscriptions are scattered throughout the Mediterranean region, from Tunisia to Rhodes, Kos, Delos, Miletus in the Aegean Sea and in Pozzuoli and Rome. Late Antique to medieval trade amphorae contained different food stuffs including wine and olive oil, perhaps the best known are so-called Aqaba/Ayla vessels from the Red Sea to South Asia.

=== Lakhmid kingdom ===
The Lakhmids also traded with Chinese ships which sailed along the Euphrates past the village of al-Hirah. In the northern Lakhmid kingdom (present-day Al Anbar Governorate flows the 'Isā River, which connects the Tigris and the Euphrates. To reach the Persian Gulf from al-Hirah, the Lakhmids traveled in smaller boats to the port in al-Ubulla (where there were sea ships bound for India and China). They would then depart for China via Bahrain and Aden.

== Markets ==
Seasonal markets were an important part of late pre-Islamic Arabian exchange. Islamic-era reports describe a cycle of fairs held in different parts of Arabia and its borderlands, including Dumat al-Jandal, Hajar, al-Mushaqqar, Suhar, Aden, Sana'a, Okaz, Majanna, Dhu'l-Majaz and Hajr al-Yamama. These markets combined commerce with pilgrimage, poetry, arbitration, diplomacy and tribal protection.

=== List of markets ===
The following list summarizes markets described in later Arabic and Islamic traditions:

Name	Location	Operation	Description
Dumat al-Jandal	Northern Arabia, near al-Jawf	1-15 Rabi' I	Commercial and amenity market with traders from Iraq, Syria and Arabia
Hajar	Eastern Arabia	Rabi' II	Associated with dates, dry goods, ambergris and musk
Al-Mushaqqar	Eastern Arabia	Jumada I	General market attended by Arabs and foreigners, including Persians
Oman	Southeastern Arabia	Jumada II and Ramadan	Associated with ambergris, metals and fruits
Hubasha	Tihamah	Early Rajab	Secondary market shared by Yemen, Tihamah and the Hejaz
Suhar	Oman coast	Rajab	Commercial market protected during the sacred months
Dibba	Arabian Gulf coast	End of Rajab to 10 Sha'ban	Market attended by merchants from India, Sindh, China and Arabia
Shahar Mahrah	Southern coast between Aden and Oman	15 Sha'ban	Associated with camels, ambergris, dairy products, cloth, rope and hides
Aden	South Arabia	1-10 Ramadan	Port market associated with perfumes, collyrium and pearls
Sana'a	Yemen	15-30 Ramadan	Associated with cotton, saffron, dyes, perfumes and collyrium
Hadhramaut	Southern Arabia	15-30 Dhu'l-Qa'da	Limited-size market between Oman and Yemen
Okaz	Near Ta'if	1-20 Dhu'l-Qa'da	Famous market associated with trade, poetry and pilgrimage
Majannah	Tihamah, near Mecca	20-30 Dhu'l-Qa'da	Market connected with pilgrims and merchants
Dhu'l-Majaz	Near Mount Arafat	1-8 Dhu'l-Hijja	Pilgrimage-season market near Mecca
Natat Khaybar	North of Medina	After the pilgrimage season	Commercial market associated with Khaybar
Hajr al-Yamama	Central Arabia	10-30 Muharram	General market protected during the sacred months
Dayr Ayyub	North of Bosra	After the pilgrimage season	Meeting place for Arab and Roman merchants
Bosra	Hauran	After the pilgrimage season	Commercial market associated with swords, wine and imported products
Adhri'at	Hauran	After the Bosra market	Market noted for wine
Al-Hira	Lower Mesopotamia	Uncertain	Market associated with hides, perfumes, collyrium, jewelry and horses
Al-Mirbad	Near Basra	Perennial	Later commercial and literary market

== Late antique transformation ==
The economy of Arabia in late antiquity was uneven. South Arabia underwent increasing political and economic centralization under Himyar. In the first centuries CE, commercial activity moved toward a smaller number of ports under royal control; by the fifth and sixth centuries, major economic centers were reduced mainly to Aden, Qani' and the irrigated region of Ma'rib. In the later sixth century, Mouton and Schiettecatte connect the disintegration of the Himyarite urban network with political instability, religious change, declining maritime outlets and failures in the maintenance of irrigation systems.

Eastern Arabia presents another pattern of contraction. Archaeological surveys have found limited evidence for Sasanian-period settlement and activity when compared with the Hellenistic and Parthian periods. The apparent decline is visible in the scarcity of secure settlements, graves, coins and diagnostic material, though the historical sources still show Sasanian and Lakhmid interest in the region.

Central Arabia does not fit a simple narrative of collapse. The development of oasis settlements in the Najd was comparatively late, and sites such as al-Yamama and Qaryat al-Faw show the emergence or continuation of agricultural and exchange systems in the first millennium BCE and later. In western Arabia, late antique changes in Red Sea commerce and South Arabian politics helped create a setting in which Mecca, Najran and other caravan-linked communities could play larger commercial roles, though the scale of that commerce remains debated.

== Sources ==
- Al Saif, Abdullah Muhammed (2025). "Ḥajr Market in al-Yamāma from the Pre-Islamic Period until the End of the Umayyad Era". Darah Journal of Arabian Peninsula Studies. 3 (2): 256–269. doi:10.1163/29501639-03020004.
- Bonner, Michael (2011). ""Time Has Come Full Circle": Markets, Fairs and the Calendar in Arabia Before Islam". In Ahmed, Asad Q.; Sadeghi, Behnam; Bonner, Michael (eds.). The Islamic Scholarly Tradition: Studies in History, Law, and Thought in Honor of Professor Michael Allan Cook. Brill. pp. 13–48. doi:10.1163/ej.9789004194359.i-386.9.
- Bouchaud, Charlène; Tengberg, Margareta; Dal Prà, Patricia (2011). "Cotton cultivation and textile production in the Arabian Peninsula during antiquity: The evidence from Madâ'in Sâlih (Saudi Arabia) and Qal'at al-Bahrain (Bahrain)". Vegetation History and Archaeobotany. 20 (5): 405–417. doi:10.1007/s00334-011-0296-0.
- Chambraud, Elora; Monchot, Hervé; Dabrowski, Vladimir; Bouchaud, Charlène; Schiettecatte, Jérémie (2026). "The Late Agricultural Development of Central Arabian Oases: Archaeobotanical and Archaeozoological Studies of the al-Kharj Oasis". Arabian Archaeology and Epigraphy: 1–39. doi:10.1111/aae.70028.
- Crone, Patricia (2007). "Quraysh and the Roman Army: Making Sense of the Meccan Leather Trade". In Cook, Michael (ed.). From Kavad to al-Ghazali: Religion, Law and Political Thought in the Near East, c. 600-c. 1100. Ashgate. pp. 63–88.
- Dabrowski, Vladimir; Bouchaud, Charlène; Desormeau, Priscilla; Herveux, Linda; Chambraud, Elora; Ryan, Philippa; Tengberg, Margareta (2026). "A tale of new crops in a hot and dry land: First evidence of sorghum, cotton and rice in the Arabian Peninsula". Vegetation History and Archaeobotany. 35: 181–194. doi:10.1007/s00334-025-01022-7.
- Ghabin, Ahmad (2017). "The Attitude of the Pre-Islamic Arabs Toward Crafts and Artisans". Journal of the Economic and Social History of the Orient. 60 (1–2): 1–68. doi:10.1163/15685209-12341419.
- Heck, Gene W. (1999). "Gold Mining in Arabia and the Rise of the Islamic State". Journal of the Economic and Social History of the Orient. 42 (3): 364–395. doi:10.1163/1568520991208611.
- Heck, Gene W. (2003). "Arabia Without Spices: An Alternate Hypothesis". Journal of the American Oriental Society. 123 (3): 547–576. doi:10.2307/3217743.
- Hoyland, Robert G. (2002), Arabia and the Arabs: From the Bronze Age to the Coming of Islam, Routledge, ISBN 978-1-134-64634-0
- Kennet, Derek (2007). "The Decline of Eastern Arabia in the Sasanian Period". Arabian Archaeology and Epigraphy. 18 (1): 86–122. doi:10.1111/j.1600-0471.2007.00275.x.
- Morony, Michael G. (2019). "The Early Islamic Mining Boom". In Delattre, Alain; Legendre, Marie; Sijpesteijn, Petra M. (eds.). Authority and Control in the Countryside: From Antiquity to Islam in the Mediterranean and Near East (Sixth-Tenth Century). Brill. pp. 166–221. doi:10.1163/9789004386549_009.
- Mouton, Michel; Schiettecatte, Jérémie (2014). In the Desert Margins: The Settlement Process in Ancient South and East Arabia. Arabia Antica. L'Erma di Bretschneider. ISBN 978-88-913-0677-7.
- Robin, Christian Julien (2015). "La reprise du commerce caravanier transarabique à la fin de l'Antiquité". In Nehmé, Laïla (ed.). Arabian and Islamic Studies: A Collection of Papers in Honour of M. C. A. Macdonald. Archaeopress. pp. 283–306.
- Schiettecatte, Jérémie (2012). "L'Arabie du Sud et la mer du IIIe siècle av. au VIe siècle apr. J.-C.". In Gajda, Iwona; Robin, Christian Julien (eds.). Autour du Périple de la mer Érythrée. De Boccard. pp. 235–270.
- Schiettecatte, Jérémie; Zouache, Abbès (2017). "The Horse in Arabia and the Arabian Horse: Origins, Myths and Realities". Arabian Humanities (8). doi:10.4000/arabianhumanities.3280.
