= Wabar =

Wabar may refer to:

- A legendary land in southern Arabia, often referred to as Atlantis of the Sands
  - It is considered by some to be the same as Iram of the Pillars
- The meteorite name and impact site of Wabar craters, found in 1932 during a search for the city of Wabar
- Wabar, the title held by the head of the Degoodi clan of the Somali people
- A computer program called Waybar, designed to display system information on a portion of the screen.
