= Archaeological site of Shisr =

Archeological site in Oman

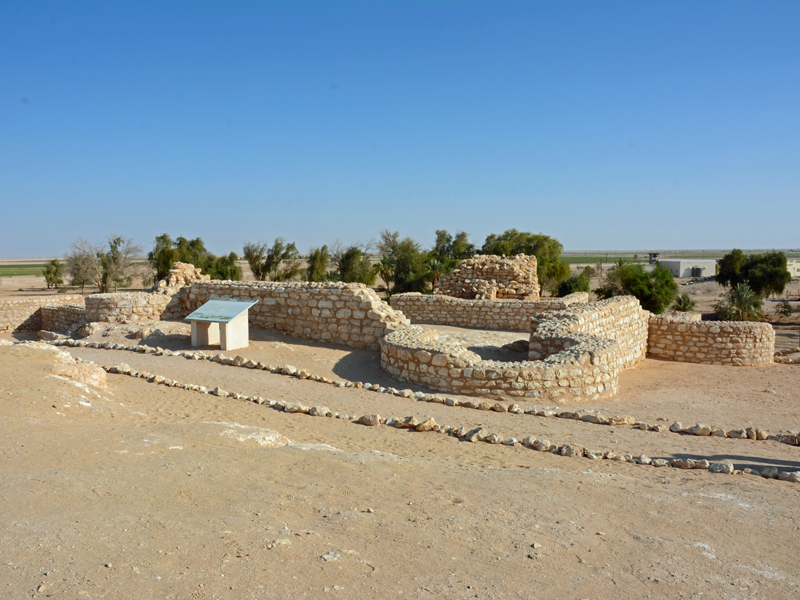

- Location within Oman
- 18°15′18″N 53°38′56″E
- Type: Trading post
- Location: Ash Shiṣr, Thumrait, Dhofar
- Part of: Land of Frankincense

History
- Built: 4th century
- Abandoned: 15th–16th century

The archaeological site of Shisr is located next to the village of Ash Shiṣr in Dhofar, Oman. The settlement was an inland trading post and has been a UNESCO World Heritage Site Land of Frankincense since 2000. It used to be an oasis.

Some considered it to be the legendary lost city of Ubar or Iram. This is not always accepted by scholars. There is a probability that it might have been in the land of Ubar which was a historical region rather than a city. The site might have inspired the legend of the lost city of Ubar when the spring dried up and the settlement was abandoned.
