= Al-Baleed Archaeological Park =

Archaeological site in Oman

- البليد (Arabic)
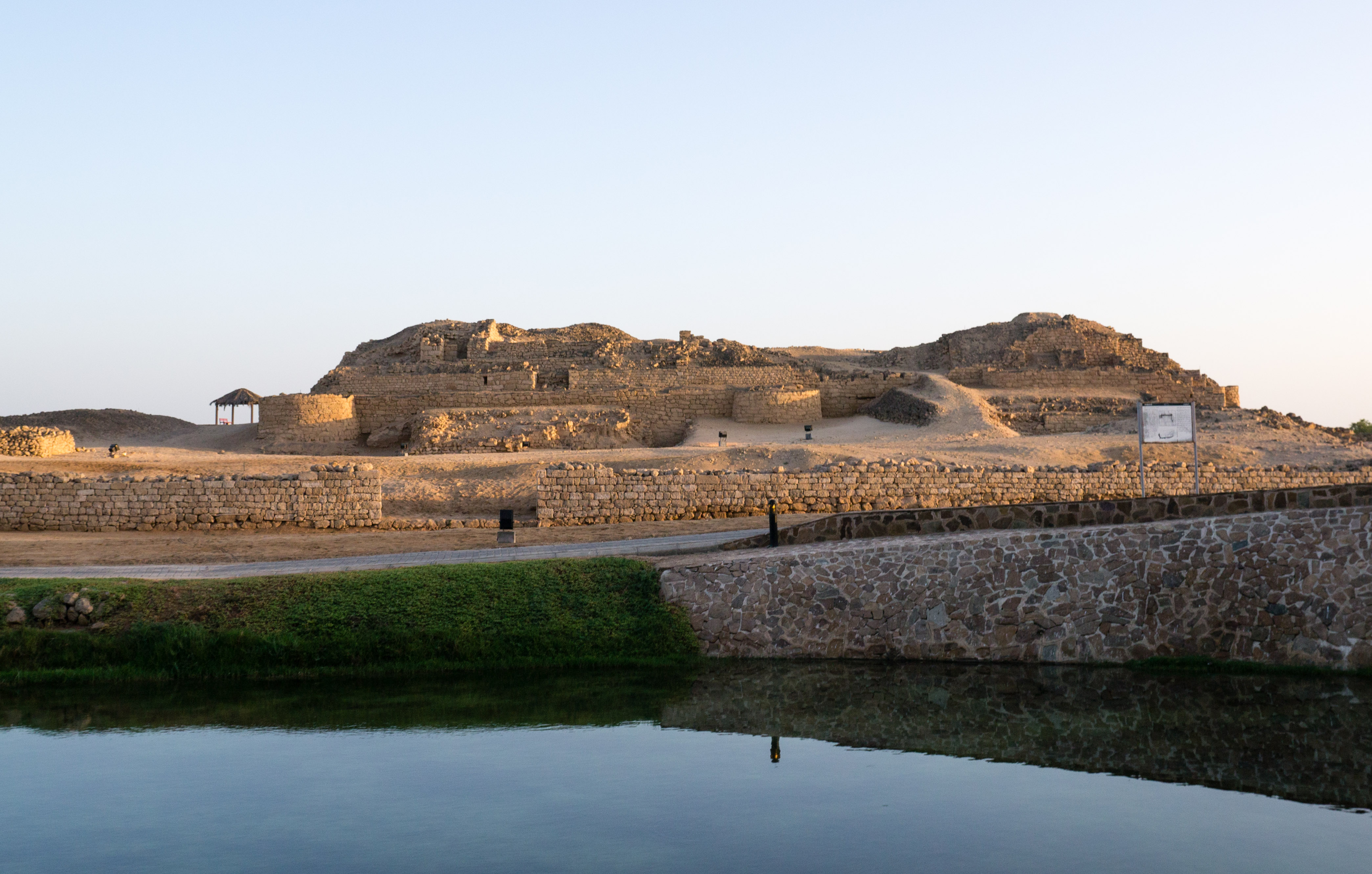

- Location within Oman
- 17°00′23″N 54°07′50″E
- Type: city
- Location: Salalah, Dhofar, Oman
- Region: Arabia
- Part of: Land of Frankincense

History
- Built: 6th century
- Abandoned: 17th century

Site notes
- Excavation dates: 1952–present

Al-Baleed Archaeological Park is an archaeological park located in Al Balīd (Arabic: البليد) of Salalah, Dhofar, Oman. It is a part of the Land of Frankincense in the UNESCO World Heritage Site since 2000.

The ruins in the park belong to the medieval city of Ẓafār/Ẓufār (Arabic: ظفار) which also covers the adjacent area in Ar Rubāṭ (Arabic: الرباط). Ẓafār/Ẓufar, from which the Dhofar Governorate got its name, acted as an important port for frankincense trade after the decline of the nearby port in Khor Rori. It is sometimes associated with Sapphara Metropolis mentioned by ancient Greek/Roman authors, but this name more likely refers to the ancient Himyarite city with the same name.

It was visited by many famous travellers, such as Marco Polo, Ibn Battuta, Ibn al-Mujawir and Zheng He. The city declined in the 16th–17th centuries due to various reasons such as the closure of the lake Khawr al Balīd (which used to be a bay) and Portuguese/Turkish/Mamluk invasion.

The park also contains the Museum of the Land of Frankincense.
