= Museum of the Land of Frankincense =

Coordinates: 17.00936°N 54.13611°E

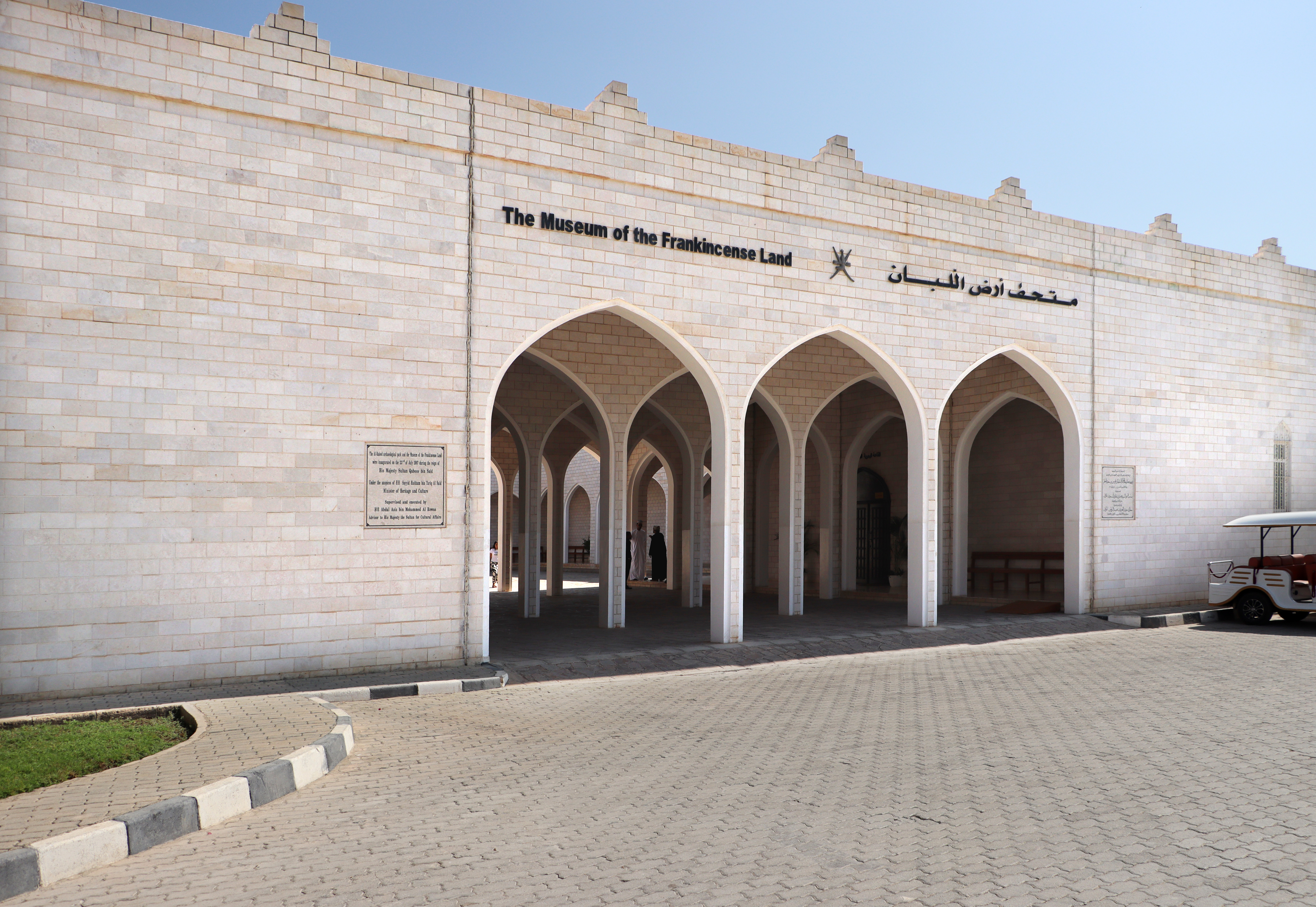
Museum entrance

The Museum of the Land of Frankincense (Arabic: متحف أرض اللبان) (also known as the Land of Frankincense Museum) is a museum in Salalah, Dhofar Governorate, Oman, based on frankincense, in association with the Al-Baleed Archaeological Park, a UNESCO World Heritage Site. The museum was inaugurated in 2007.

== History ==
The Dhofar Governorate, of which Salalah is the capital, has historically been one of the few natural environments in which the frankincense tree (Boswellia sacra) is able to grow. This caused UNESCO to ascribe World Heritage Site status to the Land of Frankincense in the November 2000. The museum is located within the Al-Baleed Archaeological Park, part of the UNESCO World Heritage site. The museum was inaugurated in 2007, having taken two years to construct. Funding for the museum came from Sultan Qaboos.

== Collections ==
The museum collections are divided into two main halls.

=== Maritime Hall ===
The maritime hall showcases the country's maritime history, and the influence this played in the country's ability to trade in luxury goods, including frankincense. This section includes examples of Omani vessels, and a virtual reality exhibit.

=== History Hall ===
This section displays a more general overview of Omani history, including Dhofar's history, a history of Islam in Oman, the geography of Oman, and Ancient Oman. Additionally, you are able to learn about the uses of frankincense across history, for example in religious practices and traditional medicine.

== See also ==
- Land of Frankincense
- List of museums in Oman
