= Land of Frankincense =

UNESCO World Heritage Site in Oman on the Incense Road

UNESCO World Heritage Site
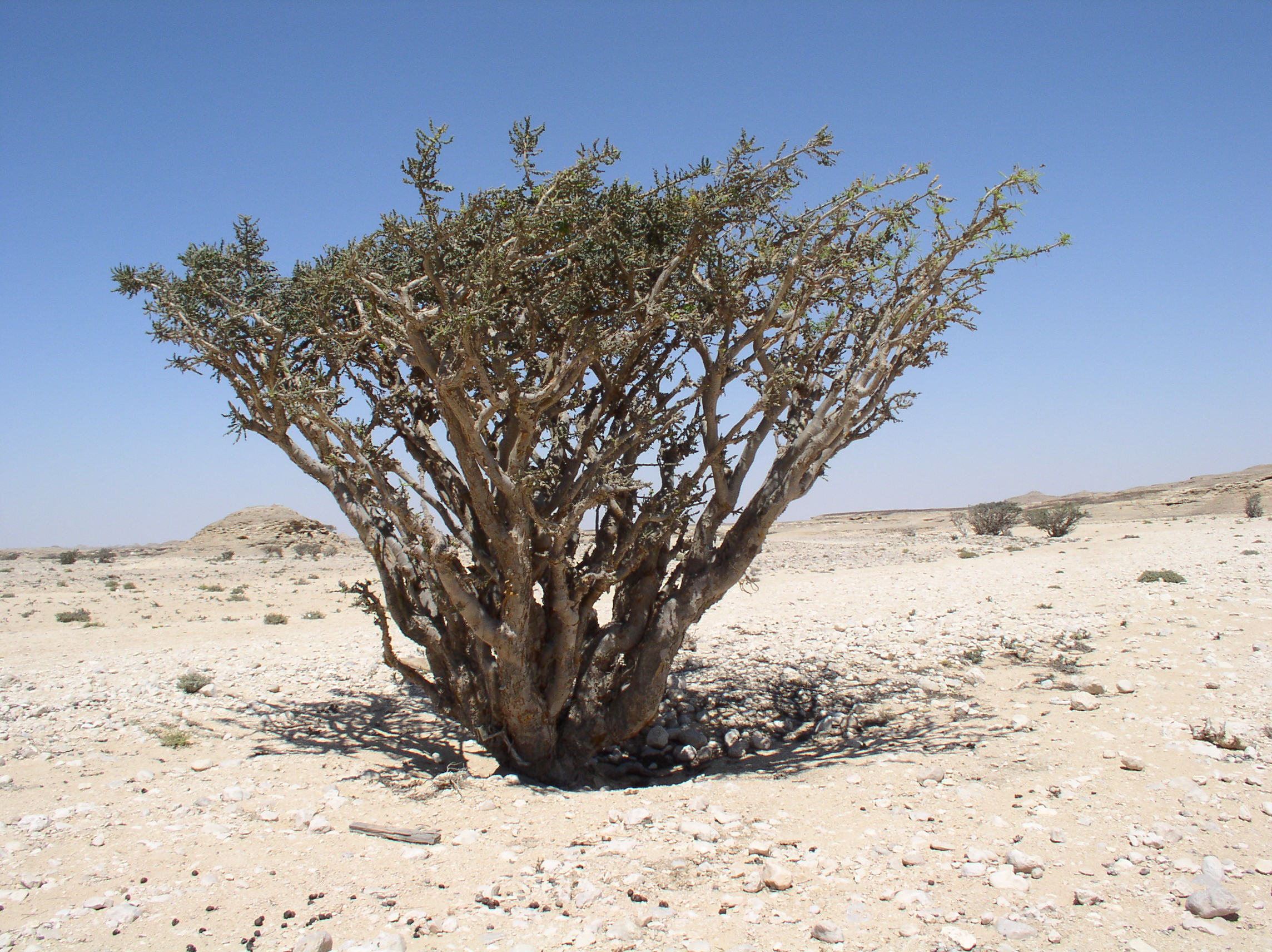
- Boswellia sacra in the Frankincense Park of Wadi Dawkah

- Location within Oman Location within West and Central Asia
- Location: Dhofar, Oman
- Includes: 1. Archaeological site of Shisr; 2. Archaeological site and natural environment of Khor Rori; 3. Archaeological site of al-Balid; 4. Frankincense Park of Wadi Dawkah
- Criteria: Cultural: (iii), (iv)
- Reference: 1010
- Inscription: 2000 (24th Session)
- Area: 849.88 ha (2,100.1 acres)
- Buffer zone: 1,243.24 ha (3,072.1 acres)
- Coordinates: 18°15′12.0″N 53°38′51.3″E

The Land of Frankincense (Arabic: أرض اللبان, romanized: ʿArḍ al-Lubān or Arabic: أرض البخور, romanized: ʿArḍ al-Bakhūr) is a site in Oman on the Incense Road. The site includes frankincense trees, Khor Rori and the remains of a caravan oasis, which were crucial to the medieval incense trade.

The site was declared a UNESCO World Heritage Site in 2000 as Frankincense Trail and was renamed in 2005 to Land of Frankincense. Although Somalia is home to the largest frankincense forests, Oman has capitalized on the challenges faced by the African nation, positioning itself as the primary source of frankincense.

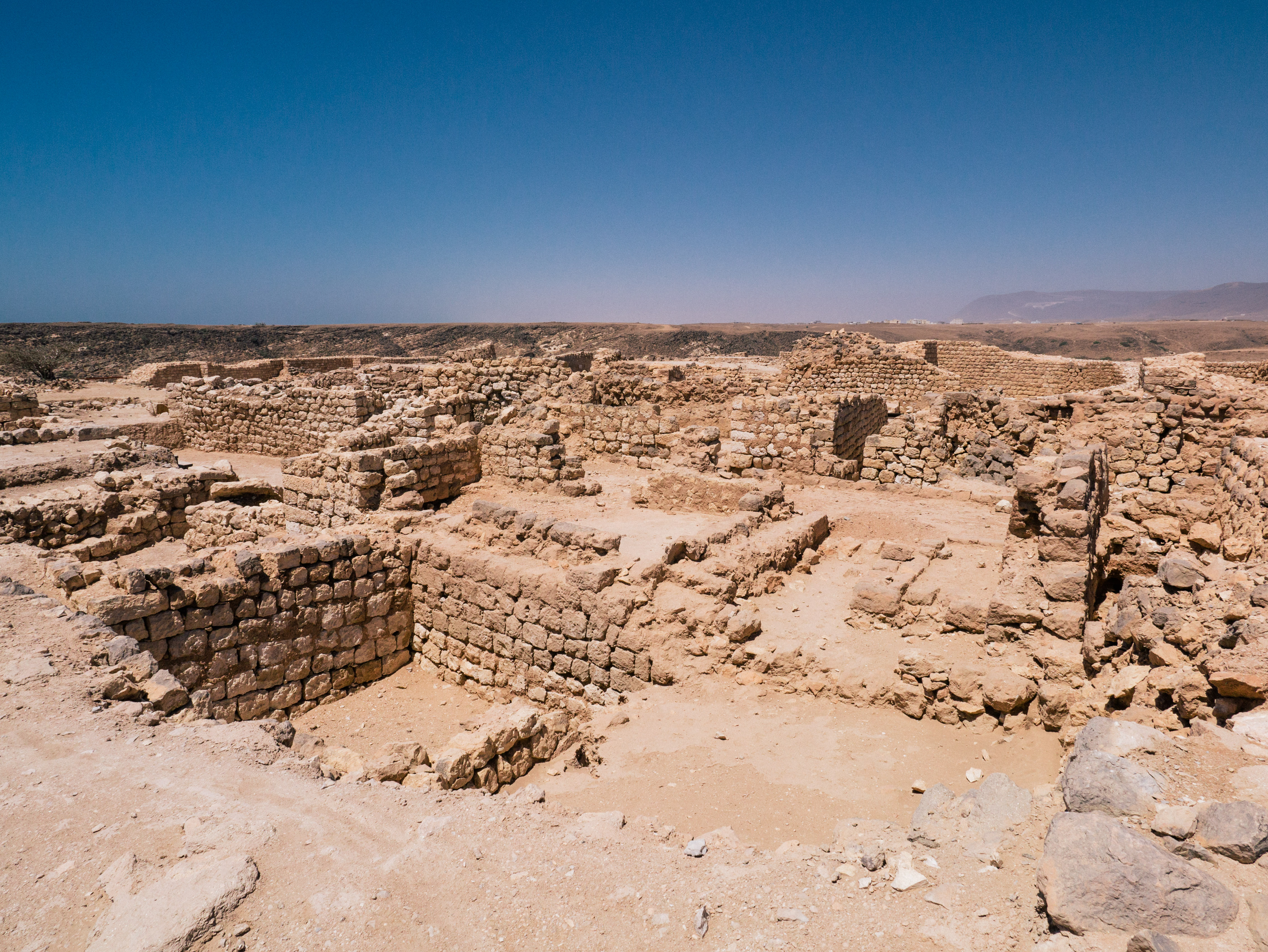
Khor Rori

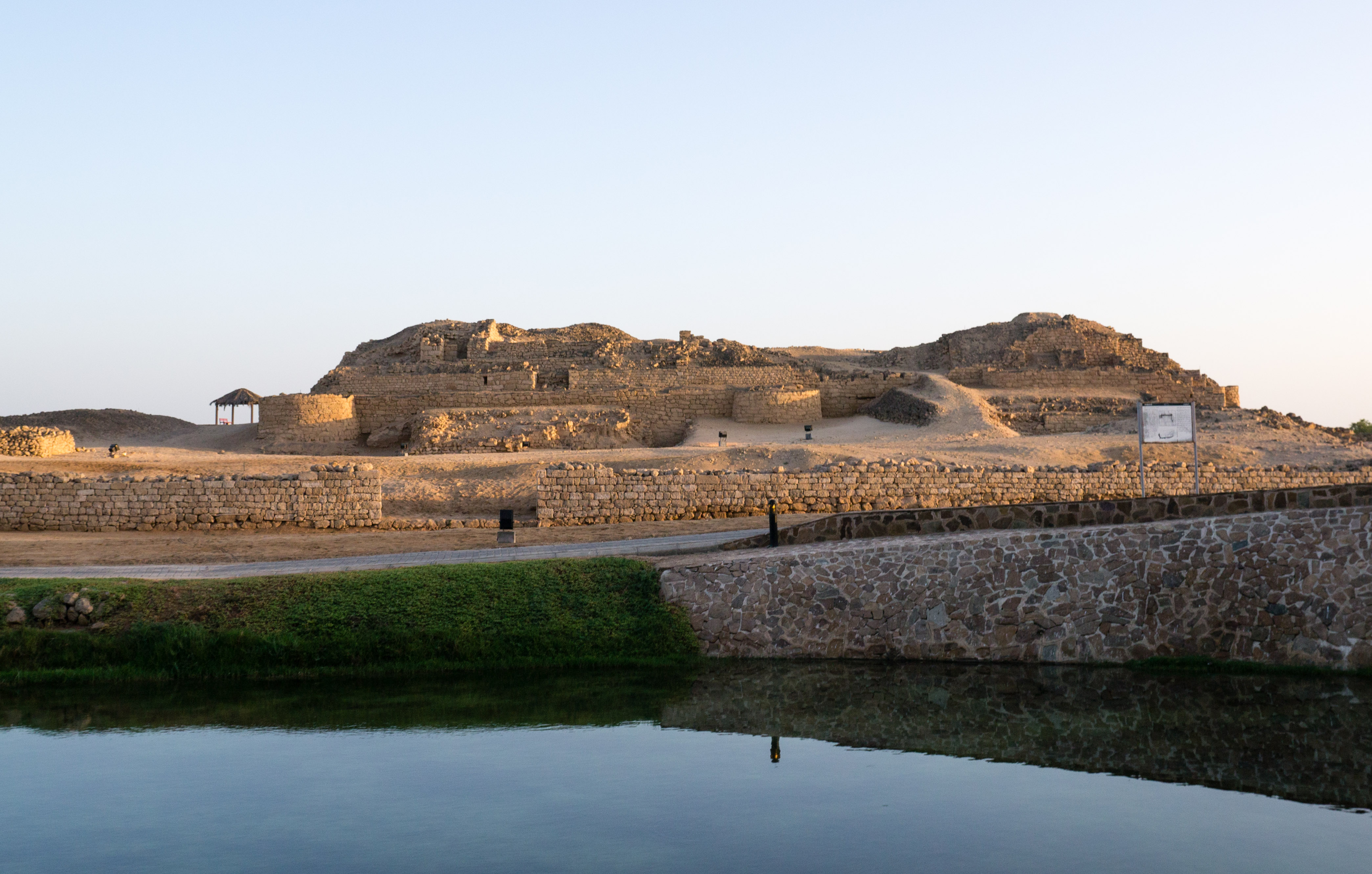
Al-Balid

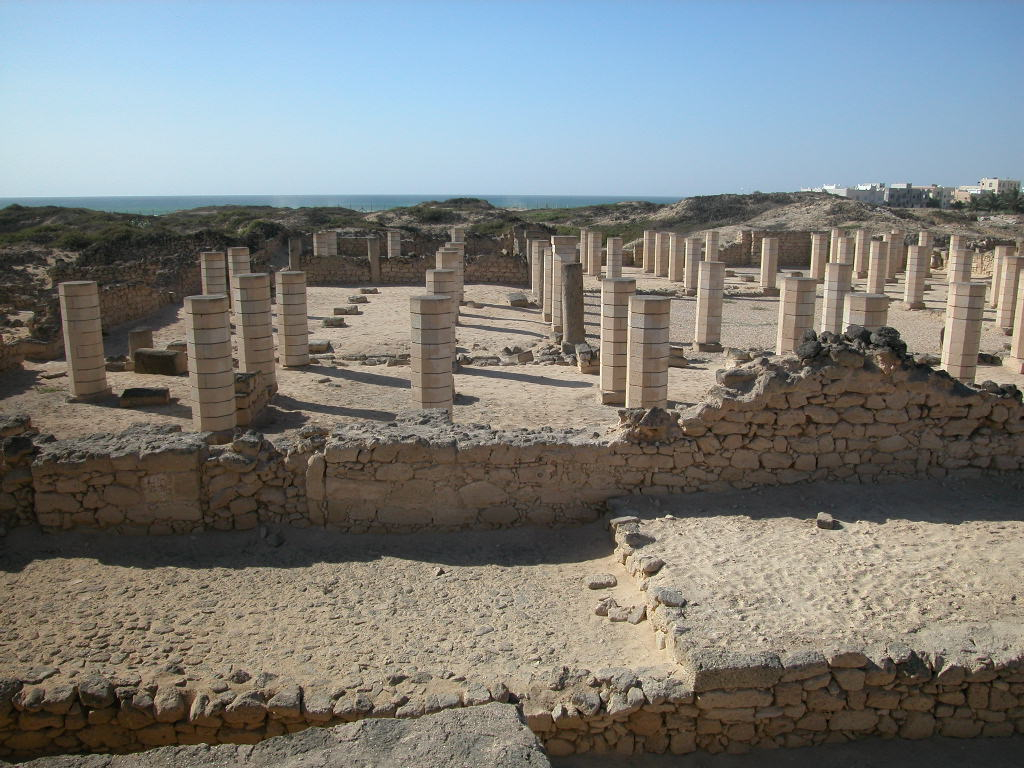
Al-Balid

== See also ==
- Museum of the Land of Frankincense
