= Atlantis of the Sands =

Legendary lost city in the Arabian desert

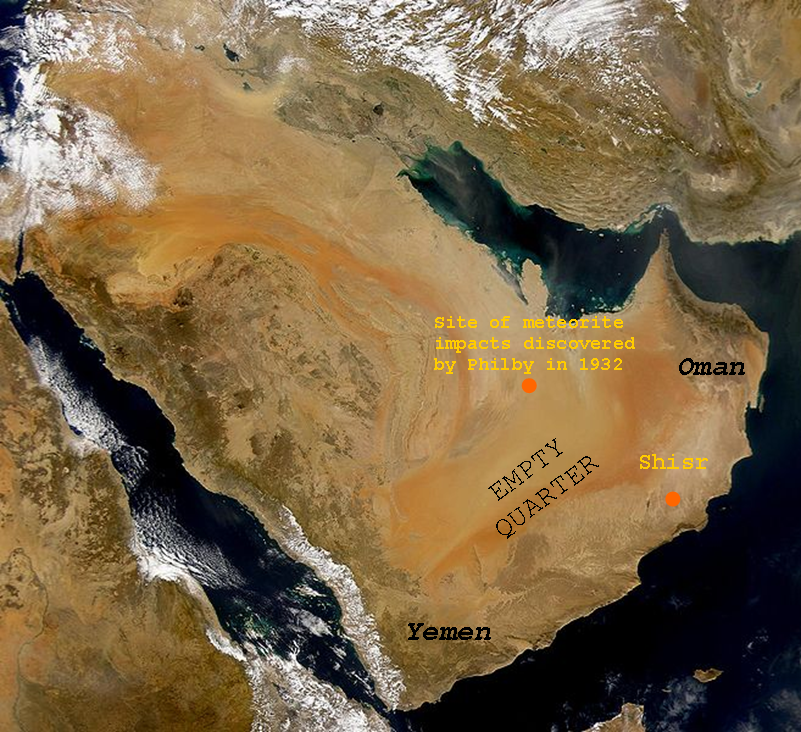
A satellite photograph of southern Arabia showing suspected sites of a lost city.

Atlantis of the Sands refers to a legendary lost place in the southern deserts of the Arabian Peninsula, known as Ūbār/Awbār (أوبار) or Wabār/Wubār (وبار) in Arabic, thought to have been destroyed by a natural disaster or as a punishment by God.

The English name is commonly attributed to T. E. Lawrence in the 20th century, but it never appears in Lawrence's published works, and neither Bertram Thomas who made "Atlantis of the Sands" public (and was probably the real coiner of this term) nor Ranulph Fiennes and Nicholas Clapp who made this term popular have ever attributed this term to Lawrence.

Ubar is often said to be mentioned in the Quran and One Thousand and One Nights, but that is not the case. The misconception is due to the equation of Ubar with Iram by Nicholas Clapp, but such equation is not generally accepted by scholars.

== Introduction ==
In modern times, the mystery of the lost city of Atlantis has generated several books, films, articles, and web pages. (See Atlantis in popular culture) On a smaller scale, Arabia has its own legend of a lost city, the so-called "Atlantis of the Sands", which has been the source of debate among historians, archaeologists and explorers, and a degree of controversy that continues to this day.

In February 1992, The New York Times announced a major archaeological discovery in the following terms: "Guided by ancient maps and sharp-eyed surveys from space, archaeologists and explorers have discovered a lost city deep in the sands of Arabia, and they are virtually sure it is Ubar, the fabled trading centre of the rich frankincense trade thousands of years ago." When news of this discovery spread quickly around the newspapers of the world, there seemed few people willing or able to challenge the dramatic findings, apart from the Saudi Arabian press.

The discovery was the result of the work of a team of archaeologists led by Nicholas Clapp, which had visited and excavated the site of a Bedouin well at Shisr (18°15′47″N 53°39′28″E) in Dhofar province, Oman. The conclusion they reached, based on site excavations and an inspection of satellite photographs, was that this was the site of Ubar, which Clapp identified as Iram of the Pillars, a name found in the Quran which may be a lost city, a tribe or an area. Sir Ranulph Fiennes, another member of the expedition, declared that this was the Omanum Emporium of Ptolemy's famous map of Arabia Felix.

A contemporary notice at the entrance to an archaeological site at Shisr in the province of Dhofar, Oman, proclaims: "Welcome to Ubar, the Lost City of Bedouin Legend". However, scholars are divided over whether this really is the site of a legendary lost city of the sands.

== Early explorers in Dhofar ==
In 1930, the explorer Bertram Thomas had been approaching the southern edge of the Rub' al Khali ("The Empty Quarter"). It was Thomas' ambition to be the first European to cross the great sands but, as he began his camel journey, he was told by his Bedouin escorts of a lost city whose wicked people had attracted the wrath of God and had been destroyed. He found no trace of a lost city in the sands. Thomas marked on a map the location of a track that was said to lead to the legendary lost city of Ubar and, although he intended to return to follow it, he was never able to.

The story of a lost city in the sands became an explorer's fascination; a few wrote accounts of their travels that perpetuated the tale. T. E. Lawrence planned to search for the location of a lost city somewhere in the sands, telling a fellow traveller that he was convinced that the remains of an Arab civilization were to be found in the desert. He had been told that the Bedu had seen the ruins of the castles of King Ad in the region of Wabar. In his view, the best way to explore the sands was by airship, but his plans never came to fruition.

The English explorer Wilfred Thesiger visited the well at Shisr in the spring of 1946, "where the ruins of a crude stone fort on a rocky eminence marks the position of this famous well." He noted that some shards found there were possibly early Islamic. The well was the only permanent watering place in those parts and, being a necessary watering place for Bedouin raiders had been the scene of many fierce encounters in the past.

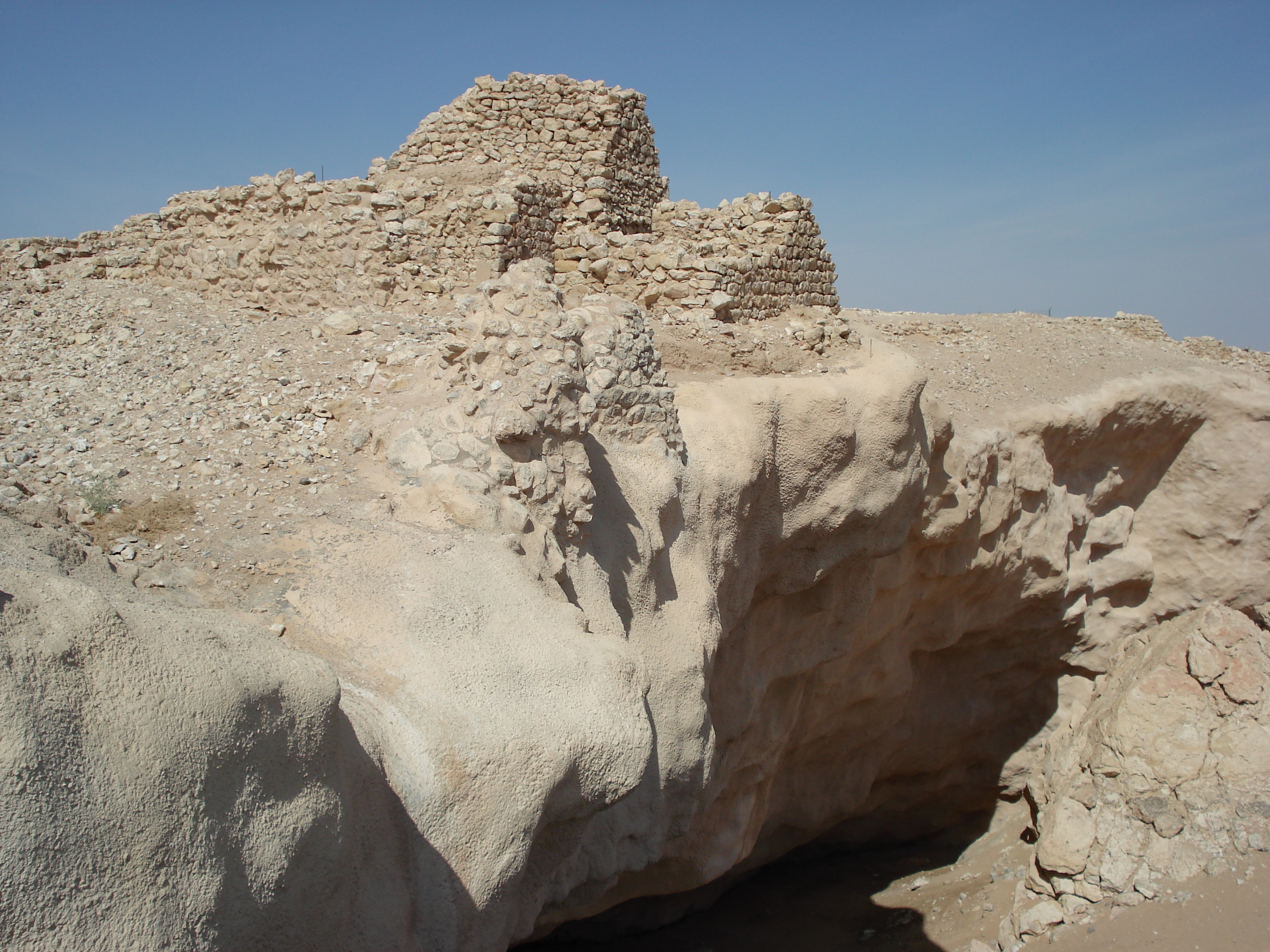
The remains of the old fort at Shisr, Dhofar, Oman.

In March 1948, a geological party from Petroleum Development (Oman and Dhofar) Ltd, an associate company of the Iraq Petroleum Company, carried out a camel-borne survey of Dhofar province. Like Thesiger, the party approached Shisr from the south, along the Wadi Ghudun. Their first sight of Ash Shisur was a white cliff in the distance. As they drew closer, they could see that the cliff was in fact the wall of a ruined fort built above a large quarry-like cave, the entrance of which was obscured by a sand dune.

The fort had been built from the same white rock as the overhanging cliff, giving the impression of a single structure. One of the geologists noted: "There are no houses, tents or people here: only the tumble-down ruin of this pre-Islamic fort." The geologists, without the benefit of modern satellite analysis or archaeological equipment, were unimpressed by the ruin. Shisur, like Ma Shedid a few days before, was a 'difficult water' and their escorts spent the best part of their three-day stay trying to extract water for their camels from the well.

In 1953, oil man and philanthropist Wendell Phillips set out to discover Thomas' track but was unable to follow it because of the heavy sands which made further travel by motor transport impossible.

Some 35 years later, Clapp and his team reported uncovering what they described as a large octagonal fortress dating back some 2,000 years beneath the crumbling fort and described a vast limestone table that lay beneath the main gate which had collapsed into a massive sinkhole around the well. This, some concluded, was the fabled city of Ubar, which was also known as Iram, or at least a city in the region of Ubar, once an important trading post on the incense route from Dhofar to the Mediterranean region.

Some pointed to religious texts to support the theory that the city was destroyed as a punishment by God. Iram, for example, was described in the Qur'an as follows: "Have you not considered how your Lord dealt with ʕĀd - [with] Iram - who had lofty pillars, The like of which were not produced in (all) the land?" (Surat al-Fajr: 6–8) The location of Iram has also been claimed to be Wadi Rum, due to Safaitic inscriptions mentioning 𐪑𐪇𐪃 (ʔrm) "Iram" and 𐪒𐪕 (ʕd) "ʕĀd" found in the region.

== Theories about the location ==
=== Dhofar ===
Bertram Thomas' guide pointed to wide tracks between the dunes and said: "Look, Sahib, there is the way to Ubar. It was great in treasure, with date gardens and a fort of red silver. It now lies beneath the sands of the Ramlat Shu'ait." Thomas also wrote, "On my previous journeys I had heard from other Arabs of the name of this Atlantis of the Sands, but none could tell me of even an approximate location."

=== Rub' al-Khali ===
Most tales of the lost city locate it somewhere in the Rub' al Khali desert, also known as the Empty Quarter, a vast area of sand dunes covering most of the southern third of the Arabian Peninsula, including most of Saudi Arabia and parts of Oman, the United Arab Emirates, and Yemen.

St. John Philby (who preferred the name "Wabar" for the lost city) was an English adviser to Emir Aziz bin Saud in Riyadh. He first heard the story of Ubar from his Bedouin guide, who told him about a place of ruined castles where King Ad had stabled his horses and housed his women before being punished for his sinful ways by being destroyed by fire from heaven.

Anxious to seal his reputation as a great explorer, Philby went in search of the lost city of Wabar but, instead of finding ruins, discovered what he described as an extinct volcano half-buried in the sands or, possibly, the remnants of a meteorite impact. Modern research has confirmed an ancient impact event as the cause of the depression in the sands.

Geologist H. Stewart Edgell observed that for the "last six thousand years the Empty Quarter has been continuously a sand-dune desert, presenting a hostile environment where no city could have been built."

=== Shisr ===
Nicholas Clapp claimed that the discovery of the remains of towers at the Shisr excavation site supported the theory that this was the site of Ubar, the city of 'Ad with "lofty pillars" described in the Qur'an. Thomas dismissed the ruins at the well of Ash Shisur as a "rude" fort which he took to be only a few hundred years old.

=== Omanum Emporium ===
Ranulph Fiennes, explorer and adventurer, was a member of Clapp's expedition and speculated that Ubar was identified on ancient maps as "Omanum Emporium". This was a place marked on a map of Arabia compiled by Claudius Ptolemy in about AD 150.

=== Others ===
When the explorer Freya Stark consulted the works of Arab geographers, she found a wide range of opinions as to the location of Wabar: "Yaqut says: "In Yemen is the qaria of Wabar." El-Laith, quoted by Yaqut, puts it between the sands of Yabrin and Yemen. Ibn Ishaq… places it between "Sabub (unknown to Yaqut and Hamdani) and the Hadhramaut". Hamdani, a very reliable man, places it between Najran, Hadhramaut, Shihr and Mahra. Yaqut, presumably citing Hamdani, puts it between the boundaries of Shihr and Sanaa, and then, on the authority of Abu Mundhir between the sands of B.Sa'd (near Yabrin) and Shihr and Mahra. Abu Mundhir puts it between Hadhramaut and Najran."

"With such evidence," Stark concluded, "it seems quite possible for Mr. Thomas and Mr. Philby each to find Wabar in an opposite corner of Arabia."

== The Shisr discoveries ==
Nicholas Clapp's search for Ubar began after he read Thomas' book Arabia Felix. Clapp had just returned from Oman, having helped to stock an oryx sanctuary on the Jiddat al Harassis, and was inspired by Thomas' references to the lost city of Ubar. He began his search for Ubar in the library of the University of California in Los Angeles, and found a 2nd-century AD map by the Alexandrian geographer Claudius Ptolemy which showed a place called "Omanum Emporium". He speculated that this might be the location of Ubar, situated on the incense route between Dhofar and the Mediterranean region. Aware that Mayan remains had been identified from aerial photographs, Clapp contacted NASA's Jet Propulsion Laboratory and obtained satellite images of Dhofar. These helped to identify ancient camel tracks hidden beneath the shifting sands of the desert which in turn might identify places of convergence such as wells and ancient cities.

After Clapp's team had visited several possible sites for Ubar, they found themselves drawn back to the crumbling ruin at Shisr. Although the fort had been written off as being no more than a few hundred years old by the earlier explorers, Clapp's team began to speculate that the fort had been rebuilt in the 1500s on the remains of a far more ancient site.

Under the direction of Juris Zarins, the team began excavation, and within weeks had unearthed the wall and towers of a fortress dating back more than 2,000 years. Clapp suggested that the evidence was "a convincing match" for the legendary lost city of Ubar. The city's destruction, he postulated, happened between A.D. 300 and 500 as the result of an earthquake that precipitated the collapse of the limestone table; but it was the decline of the incense trade, which led to the decline of the caravan routes through Shisr, that sealed Ubar's fate.

Zarins himself concluded that Shisr did not represent a city called Ubar. In a 1996 interview on the subject of Ubar, he said:

There's a lot of confusion about that word. If you look at the classical texts and the Arab historical sources, Ubar refers to a region and a group of people, not to a specific town. People always overlook that. It's very clear on Ptolemy's second-century map of the area. It says in big letters "Iobaritae". And in his text that accompanied the maps, he's very clear about that. It was only the late medieval version of One Thousand and One Nights, in the fourteenth or fifteenth century, that romanticised Ubar and turned it into a city, rather than a region or a people."

In a more recent paper, he suggested that modern Habarut may be the site of Ubar.

By 2007, following further research and excavation, their findings could be summarised as follows:

- A long period of widespread trade through the area of Shisr was indicated by artefacts from Persia, Rome, and Greece being found on the site. More recent work in Oman and Yemen indicated that this fortress was the easternmost remains of a series of desert caravanserais that supported incense trade.
- As far as the legend of Ubar was concerned, there was no evidence that the city had perished in a sandstorm. Much of the fortress had collapsed into a sinkhole that hosted the well, perhaps undermined by the removal of groundwater for irrigation.
- Rather than being a city, interpretation of the evidence suggested that "Ubar" was more likely to have been a region—the "Land of the Iobaritae" identified by Ptolemy. The decline of the region was probably due to a reduction in the frankincense trade caused by the Christianization of the Roman Empire, as Christianity did not require incense in the same quantities for its rituals. Also, it became difficult to find local labour to collect the resin. Climatic changes led to desiccation of the area, and sea transport became a more reliable way of transporting goods.
- The archaeological importance of the site was highlighted by satellite imagery that revealed a network of trails, some of which passed underneath sand dunes 100 m (330 ft) tall, which converged on Shisr. Image analysis showed no further evidence of major undocumented sites in this desert region, which might be considered as alternate locations for the Ubar of legend.

== Critical reception ==
The Saudi Arabian press was generally sceptical about the discovery of Ubar in Oman, with Abdullah al Masri, Assistant Under-Secretary of Archaeological Affairs stating that similar sites had been found in Saudi Arabia over the past 15 years. In Asharq al Awsat he explained: "The best of these sites was when, in 1975, we uncovered more than one city on the edge of the Empty Quarter, in particular the oasis on Jabreen. Also, the name of Ubar is similar to that of Obar, an oasis in eastern Saudi Arabia. We must await further details but so far we have far more important discoveries at Jabreen or Najran." However, Professor Mohammed Bakalla of King Saud University wrote that he would not be surprised if Ad's nation cities were found underneath the Shisr excavation or in the close vicinity.

More recent academic opinion is less than convinced about the accuracy of Clapp's findings. One reviewer noted that Clapp himself did not help matters by including a speculative chapter about the king of Ubar in his book, The Road to Ubar, which in his view undermined his narrative authority: "Its fictional drama pales next to the gripping real-life story of the Ubar expedition recounted in earlier portions of this volume."

The case for Shisr being Omanum Emporium has been questioned by recent research. Nigel Groom commented in the article "Oman and the Emirates in Ptolemy's Map" published in 2007, that Ptolemy's map of Arabia contained many wild distortions. The word "Emporium" in the original Greek meant a place for the wholesale trade of commodities carried by sea and was sometimes an inland city where taxes were collected and trade conducted. Thus the term could be applied to a town that was some distance from the coast. This, Groom suggests, may have been the case with Ptolemy's 'Omanum Emporium'. He suggested that the Hormanus River, the source of which is marked on Ptolemy's map as being north-east of Omanus Emporium, was, in fact, the Wadi Halfrain which rises some 20 kilometres northeast of Izki in modern-day central Oman. Thus, Groom concludes, Omanum Emporium was likely to have been located at Izki, possibly Nizwa, or in their vicinity.

H. Stewart Edgell contended that Ubar is essentially mythical and makes arguments against any significant historical role for Shisr beyond that of a small caravanserai. Edgell suggested that the building was small and used by a few families at most. He believed that all the "discovery" of Ubar showed was how easily scientists can succumb to wishful thinking.

In an article on the Shisr excavations Professor Barri Jones wrote: "The archaeological integrity of the site should not be allowed to be affected by possible disputes regarding its name." A 2001 report for UNESCO states: "The Oasis of Shisr and the entrepots of Khor Rori and Al-Balid are outstanding examples of medieval fortified settlements in the Persian Gulf region."

Writing about 'Wabbar', Michael Macdonald expressed doubts about the "discovery" since the site was known for decades and Sir Ranulph was stationed there.

== See also ==
- Brasil (mythical island)
- Brittia
- Lemuria (continent)
- Mayda
- Mu (lost continent)
- Sandy Island, New Caledonia
- Ys

General:

- Doggerland
- Lost lands
- Kumari Kandam
- Minoan eruption
