= Wadi Dawkah =

Wādī Dawkah
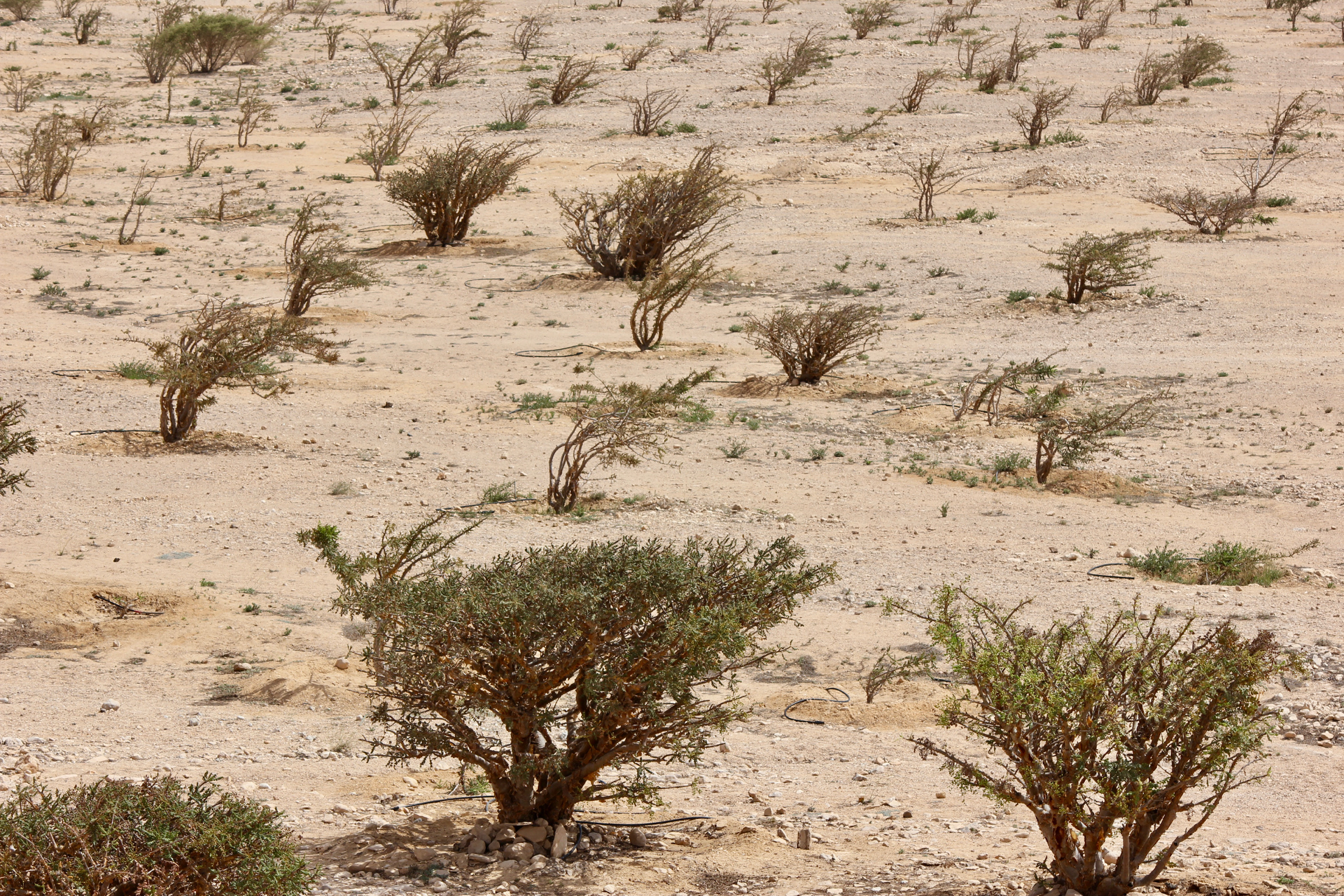
- Frankincense Park of Wadi Dawkah
- Native name: وادي دوكة (Arabic)

Location
- Country: Oman
- Governorate: Dhofar
- Provinces: Salalah, Thumrayt

Physical characteristics
- Source: Jabal al-Qarā
  - location: Salalah
- Mouth: Rub' al Khali
  - location: Dawkah, Thumrayt
  - coordinates: 18°40′N 53°52′E

Wādī Dawkah (Arabic: وادي دوكة) is a wadi in Dhofar, Oman. Beside its headwater there is a park with vast vegetation of frankincense trees, which has been a part of the UNESCO World Heritage Site Land of Frankincense since 2000.
