= Iram of the Pillars =

Ancient tribe mentioned in the Quran

Iram of the Pillars (Arabic: إرَم ذَات ٱلْعِمَاد, romanized: Iram dhāt al-ʿimād; an alternative translation is Iram of the tentpoles), also called "Irum", "Irem", "Erum", or the "City of the pillars", is a lost city mentioned in the Quran.

== Iram in the Quran ==
The Quran mentions Iram in connection with ʿimād (pillars):

89:6 Did you not see how your Lord dealt with ʿĀd—
89:7 [With] Iram - that of the pillars,
89:8 The like of which was not created in the lands;
89:9 and Thamûd who carved ˹their homes into˺ the rocks in the ˹Stone˺ Valley;
89:10 and the Pharaoh of mighty structures?
89:11 They all transgressed throughout the land,
89:12 spreading much corruption there.
89:13 So your Lord unleashed on them a scourge of punishment.
89:14 ˹For˺ your Lord is truly vigilant.

— Surah al-Fajr (6-14)

There are several explanations for the reference to "Iram – who had lofty pillars". Some see this as a geographic location, either a city or an area, others as the name of a tribe.

Those identifying it as a city have made various suggestions as to where or what city it was, ranging from Alexandria or Damascus to a city which actually moved or a city called Ubar. Ubar, according to ancient and medieval authors, was a land instead of a city.

As an area, it has been identified with the biblical region known as Aram. A more plausible candidate for Iram is Wadi Ramm in Jordan, as the Temple of al-Lat at the foot of Jabal Ramm has some ancient inscriptions mentioning Iram, as well as the tribe of ʿĀd.

It has also been identified as a tribe, possibly the tribe of ʿĀd, with the pillars referring to tent pillars. The mystic ad-Dabbagh has suggested that these verses refer to ʿĀd's tents with pillars, both of which are gold-plated. He claims that coins made of this gold remain buried and that Iram is the name of a tribe of ʿĀd and not a location. The Nabataeans were one of the many nomadic Bedouin tribes who roamed the Arabian Desert and took their herds to where they could find grassland and water. They became familiar with their area as the seasons passed, and they struggled to survive during bad years when seasonal rainfall decreased. Although the Nabataeans were initially embedded in the Aramean culture, theories that they have Aramean roots are rejected by modern scholars. Instead, archaeological, religious and linguistic evidence confirms that they are a North Arabian tribe.

In 1998, the amateur archaeologist Nicholas Clapp proposed that Iram is the same as another legendary place Ubar, and he identifies Ubar as the archaeological site of Shisr in Oman. His hypothesis is not generally accepted by scholars. The identification of Ubar as Shisr is also problematic, and even Clapp himself denied it later.

== Iram in Arabian Nights ==
Iram and its fate is also mentioned in the book of the Thousand Nights and a Night, nights 277 to 279. In Burton's translation the story is titled: "The city of Many-Columned Iram and Abdullah son of Abi Khilab."

== In fiction ==
=== Games ===
- Uncharted 3: Drake's Deception explores Iram of the Pillars in the city of Ubar.
- In Mummy: The Curse players take the role of the Arisen, servants of Irem's rulers resurrected in the modern day.
- Dominions 5: Warriors of the Faith features Iram as the playable nation Ubar, a precursor to Na'Ba, which represents the Nabataeans.
- Sunless Sea has Irem as a port of call, the city having been transported underground to a subterranean ocean. Fallen London, which exists in the same setting, likewise includes Irem as a location the player can visit late in the game.
- In Civilization VI, when the player captures the last city belonging to an AI-controlled Suleiman I, Suleiman exclaims "Ruin! Ruin! Istanbul has become Iram of the Pillars, remembered only by the melancholy poets."

=== Literature ===
- Washington Irving retells the legend of Iram of the Pillars in the story "Legend of the Arabian Astrologer".
- Edward FitzGerald's translation of the Rubaiyat of Omar Khayyam mentions Iram: "Iram indeed is gone with all its Rose," begins stanza V.
- H. P. Lovecraft, in his work "The Call of Cthulhu", uses the spelling "Irem" as referenced by a cult worshipping the Old Ones. The Shadow Over Innsmouth also includes the "many-columned Y'ha-nthlei", however due to its coastal nature also a reference to a different "City of Pillars", the Etruscian name for a trade port at Gibraltar.
- Iram is the theme of Daniel Easterman's novel The Seventh Sanctuary (1987).
- Bayard Taylor's poem "The Garden of Irem".
- Josephine Tey's novel The Singing Sands.
- Sofia Samatar's short story "Meet Me in Iram" references the city.

== See also ==
- Hadramaut
- Al-Hijr Archaeological Site
- Arabian Desert
- Al-Ukhdud ("The Ditch", or a place near Najran)
- Babil (Babylon)
- Madyan (Midian)
- Ma'rib, Saba' (Sheba)
- Qahtanite
- Sodom and Gomorrah
- The town in Surah Ya-Sin
- Wabar craters
