= Khor Rori =

Archaeological site in Oman

Khawr Rawrī
- Khor Rori
- خور روري (Arabic)
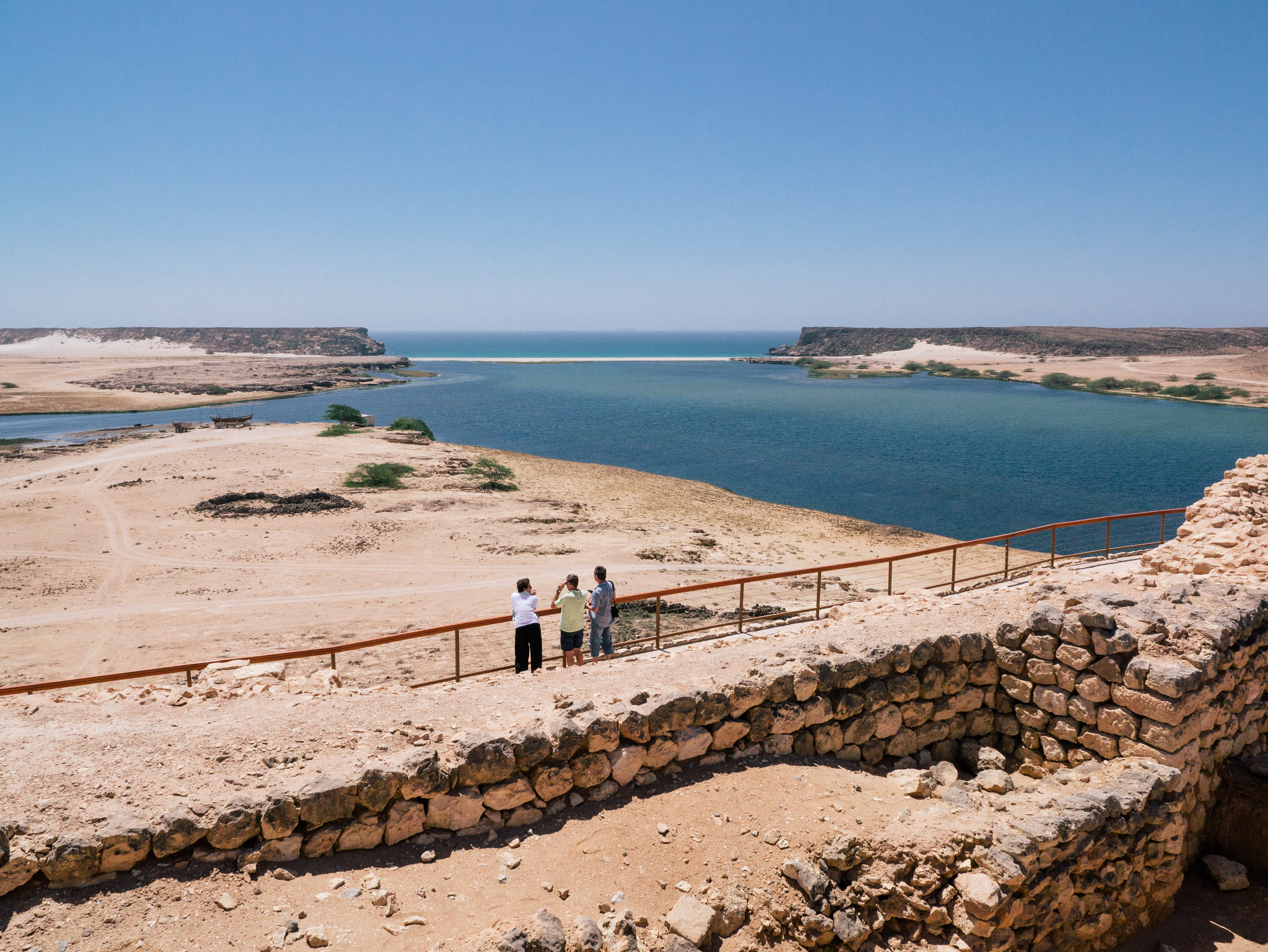
- View of Khor Rori from the ruins of Sumhuram, with Inqitat Mirbat on the left and Inqitat Taqah on the right

- Location within Oman
- Location: Wilayat Taqah, Dhofar Governorate, Oman
- Coordinates: 17°02′21.62″N 54°25′49.72″E
- Type: bar-built estuary, intermittently closed/open lake/lagoon
- River sources: Wādī Darbāt
- Ocean/sea sources: Arabian Sea
- Max. length: 2.5 kilometres (1.6 mi)
- Max. width: 0.4 kilometres (0.25 mi)
- Max. depth: 5 metres (16 ft)

Sumhuram
- سمهرم
- Samharam, Samhuram, Sumharam
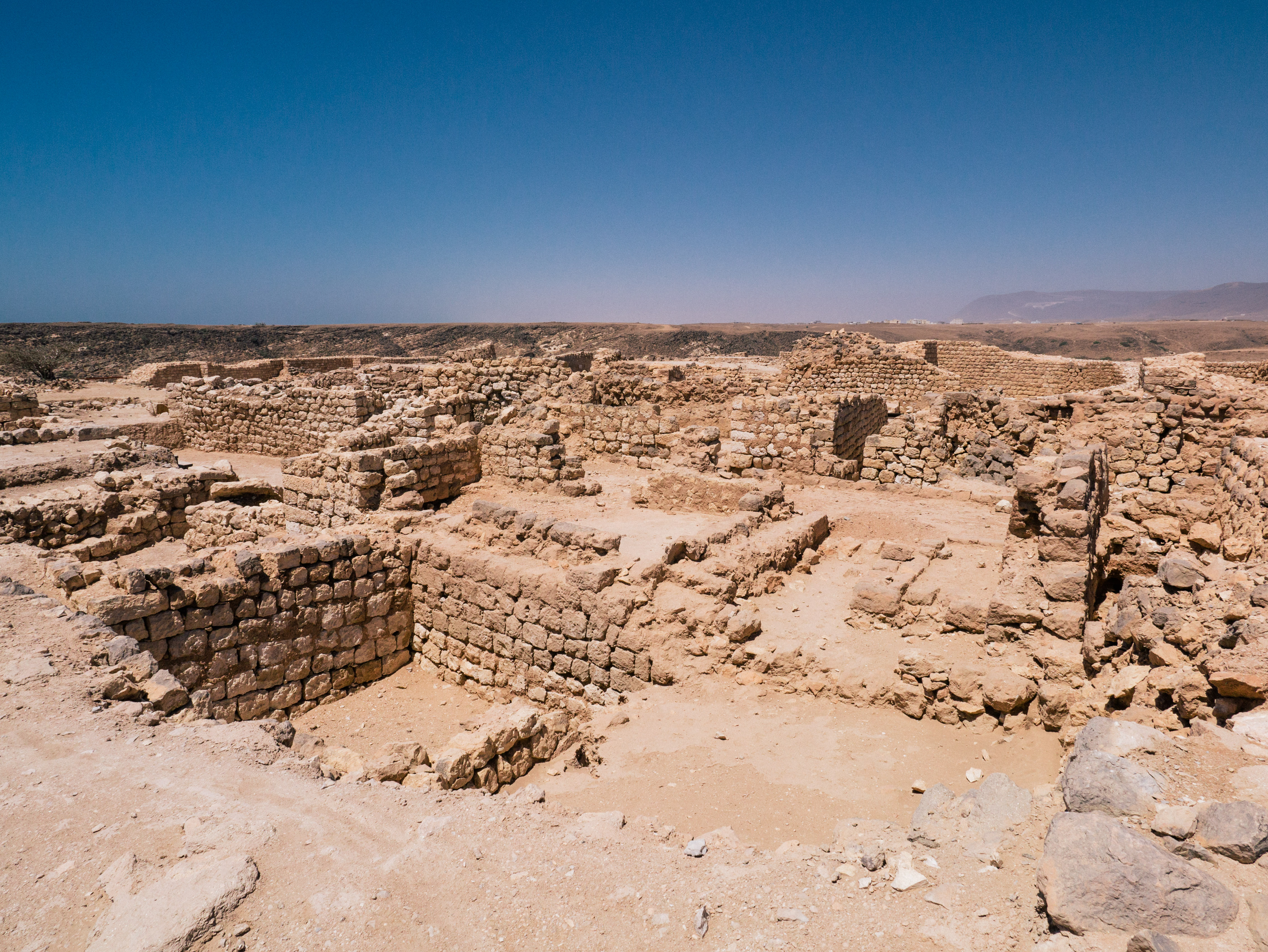
- The ruins of Sumhuram
- Interactive map of Sumhuram
- 17°2′20.4″N 54°26′4″E
- Type: fortified port city
- Cultures: Kingdom of Ḥaḍramawt, Kingdom of Ḥimyar
- Location: Wilayat Taqah, Dhofar Governorate, Oman
- Part of: Land of Frankincense

History
- Built: 3rd century BC
- Abandoned: 5th century AD

Khor Rori (Arabic: خور روري, romanized: Khawr Rawrī) is a bar-built estuary at the mouth of Wādī Darbāt in the Dhofar Governorate, Oman, near Taqah. It is an intermittently closed/open lake/lagoon, with an inlet from Arabian Sea that is usually disconnected. It is a major breeding ground for birds, and used to act as an important harbour for frankincense trade when it was an open estuary. The area represents a popular tourist spot within Oman and since 2000, is a part of the UNESCO World Heritage Site, the Land of Frankincense.

== Overview ==
Khor Rori is best known for the ruins of the ancient fortified port city of Sumhuram on the eastern bank, which was founded in the 3rd century BC as an outpost for the Kingdom of Ḥaḍramawt. After the eclipse of Ḥaḍramawt, Sumhuram was under the influence of the Kingdom of Ḥimyar, as indicated by the Himyarite coins excavated from there. It was finally abandoned in the 5th century, most likely due to the formation of the sandbar blocking the estuary.

There are also archaeological ruins on the two promontories at the mouth of Khor Rori. The eastern promontory (Inqitat Mirbat) is better explored than the western promontory (Inqitat Taqah). Inqitat Mirbat, also known as Khatiya or al-Ḥamr al-Sharqiya, had been inhabited by the 4th century BC before the emergence of Sumhuram, and its settlement history might date back to the 8th century BC. It was abandoned in the 1st or 2nd century, and re-occupied in the medieval period.

== Etymology ==
Inscriptions on an inner city gate at Khor Rori link the site to the town of Sumhuram (Hadramautic: s^{1}mhrm). Some ancient inscription scholars have read the inscriptions as "Sum-hu-rām," which using Sabaean interpretation translates to "his name is high," while others tie the name of the city to the Hadrami "Samā-ramm," meaning "the plan is great" or "great scheme." Analyses of discoveries at the site have also connected the word "Sumhuram" to the name of a Hadramawt King, rather than a place.

== Location ==
Khor Rori is situated 40km east of Salalah, Oman. The ancient city of Sumhuram was built in a wet climate suited for aquatic plant growth.

== History ==
=== Hadramawt Kingdom ===
Fragments found at Khor Rori suggest that Sumhuram was founded on royal initiative and settled by Hadhrami emigrants. The Dhofar region was the main source of frankincense in the ancient period, and it seems likely that the foundation of the settlement by the Hadhramaut was in part motivated by wish to control the production of this valuable commodity. In the anonymous Greek work Periplus Maris Erythraei, the kingdom of Hadramawt is known as "the frankincense-bearing land."

=== Himyarite Kingdom ===
Metal remains from the fourth century found at this site indicate Himyarite presence at Khor Rori.

=== Greek influences ===
Khor Rori has been tentatively identified as the location of Moscha Limen (Ancient Greek: Μόσχα λιμήν, probably meaning "the harbour of young shoots (μόσχος)" and referring to the possible mangrove vegetation in the past, or else "the harbour of musk/perfume"). The name appeared in the anonymous Periplus of the Erythraean Sea of the 1st century CE, and in Ptolemy's Geographia in the next century. It has also been identified with Abissa polis or Abyssapolis (Ancient Greek: Ἄβισσα πόλις) from Ptolemy; this name has first been connected with the abyss besides the waterfall of Wādī Darbāt, but may be related to the Abyssinian people.

=== Western exploration ===
The existence of an ancient port city in this area has been expected by 19th century western geographers based on the classical and Arabic sources. In the 1890s the location was pointed out by Eduard Glaser, and English explorer James Theodore Bent, who visited it in January 1895 with his wife Mabel, published a description of it, and reiterated the double identification.

In 1908, J.G. Lorimer recorded Khor Rori in his Gazetteer of the Persian Gulf, noting its location as the eastern extremity of Dhofar proper. He wrote:

A remarkable lake or inlet of the sea running a mile or more inland; it is the estuary of Wadi Dirbat from Jabal Samhan. The inlet is divided from the sea by a sand bar over which the water flows at high tide. A peninsula, once fortified, adjoins the east side of the entrance. Remains of ancient buildings surround the lake. There is a fortified rock at the entrance to the inlet, which is called Khatiyah. This harbour is the ancient Moscha, or Abyssapolis.

== Archaeological Excavations ==
The site was first excavated by the American Foundation for the Study of Man (AFSM) from 1952-1953 and subsequently excavated by AFSM in two additional sessions: 1958 and 1962. Between February 1996 through December 2019, excavation efforts have been carried out in Sumhuram by the Italian Mission to Oman (IMTO) under the direction of Alessandra Avanzini. The region of Dhofar was excavated by the AFSM between 1952-1960. The first campaign on this site was in 1952 and was led by Dr. Frank P. Albright. During this initial search, Dr. Albright and his team found two features of note: a well and a Himyaritic Temple. The excavations have uncovered the ground plan of the settlement and has attested maritime contacts with the Ḥaḑramite homeland, India and the Mediterranean.

It was inscribed in 2000, along with other sites along the Incense Route in Oman, as part of the World Heritage Site "Land of Frankincense".

== Trade ==
Drawing/wood engraving of leaves, flower, seed, etc., of Olibanum (Boswellia serrata).

=== Trade History ===
Khor Rori was founded in the late 3rd to early 2nd century BC by the Hadramawts as a trade port. The city was established to control the Dhofari frankincense trade and provide access to maritime trade routes. Khor Rori was fortified in the late 1st century BC under the Hadramite ruler, Yashhur'il, who oversaw the addition of a fortified wall to surround the city and a monumental gate leading out to the sea. Khor Rori served as a major international trade hub, connecting the Roman Empire, the Mediterranean, India, and Arabia.

Khor Rori's southeastern quadrant served as the trade sector of the city. This sector featured specialized port infrastructure and urban planning that supported international trade. Dedicated storage rooms were built to store frankincense and foreign trade goods, as well as a sea gate that gave ships direct access to the city and allowed for the loading and unloading of trade goods.

The trade presence in Khor Rori also supported artisans and featured active workshops such as iron forgeries, lime kilns, and bronze foundries, suggesting that Khor Rori was a manufacturing center in addition to being a major international trade hub.

=== Frankincense ===
Frankincense, the staple export from the Dhofar region, is a fragrant gum-resin collected from tapping two species of Boswellia trees. These frankincense trees are only native to two areas in the world: South Arabia and northern Somaliland. The Dhofar region produced two types of frankincense: carfiathum and dathiathum. Carfiathum is regarded as the superior frankincense to dathiathum. Frankincense was collected in seasonal cycles, carfiathum in the fall and dathiathum in the spring, enabling some degree of year-round commercial activities.

Supposedly, Egyptian and Indian goods were traded at Sumhuram in exchange for frankincense.

=== Bronze/Metals ===
Some scholars have argued that bronze was imported to Moscha Limen from Egypt and used to create coins. Sumhuram is believed to have been a center of coin manufacturing due to the corpus of bronze coins found at the site, excavated structures that resemble known warehouses from nearby cities, and trade documentation from the Periplus.

== Other contexts ==
In tourism literature, Sumhuram is occasionally promoted as the summer palace of the Queen of Sheba, the legendary ruler of the Sabaʾ Kingdom living in the 10th century BC.

Some members of the Church of Jesus Christ of Latter Day Saints believe that Khor Rori is the "land Bountiful" where Nephi from the Book of Mormon stayed during his travels from Jerusalem (First Nephi, chapter 17).

However, current archaeological evidence indicates that Sumhuram was founded in the 3rd century BC by the Kingdom of Ḥaḍramawt.

== Gallery ==
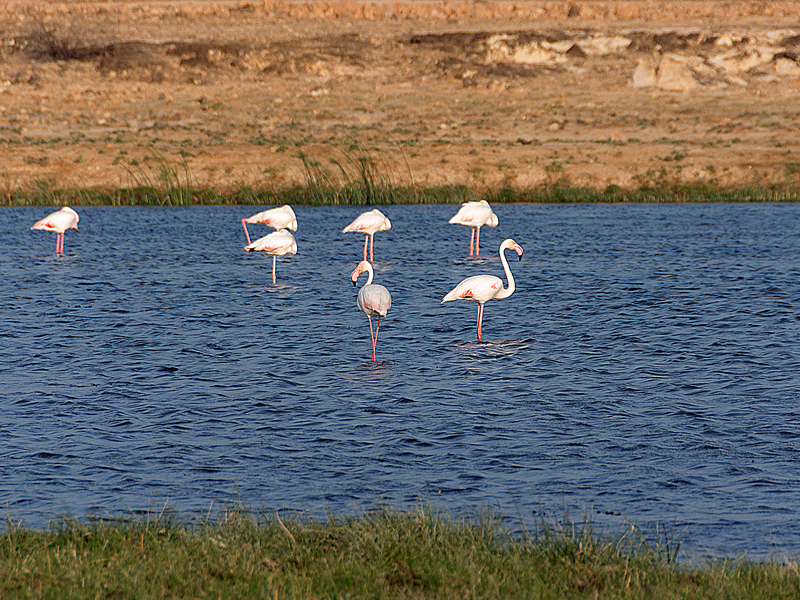
Greater flamingos in Khor Rori

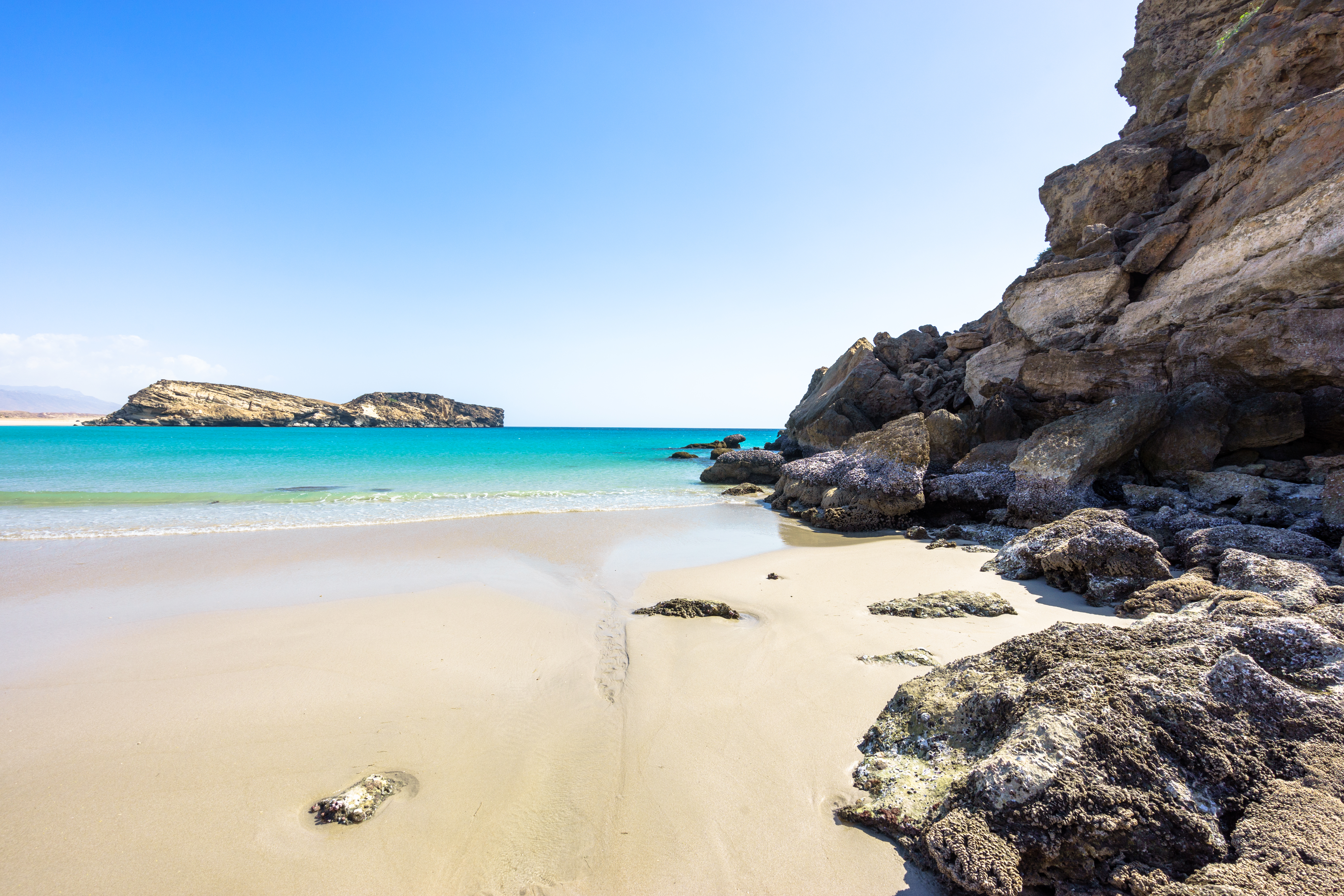
The narrow shallow channel from the sea often becomes dry.

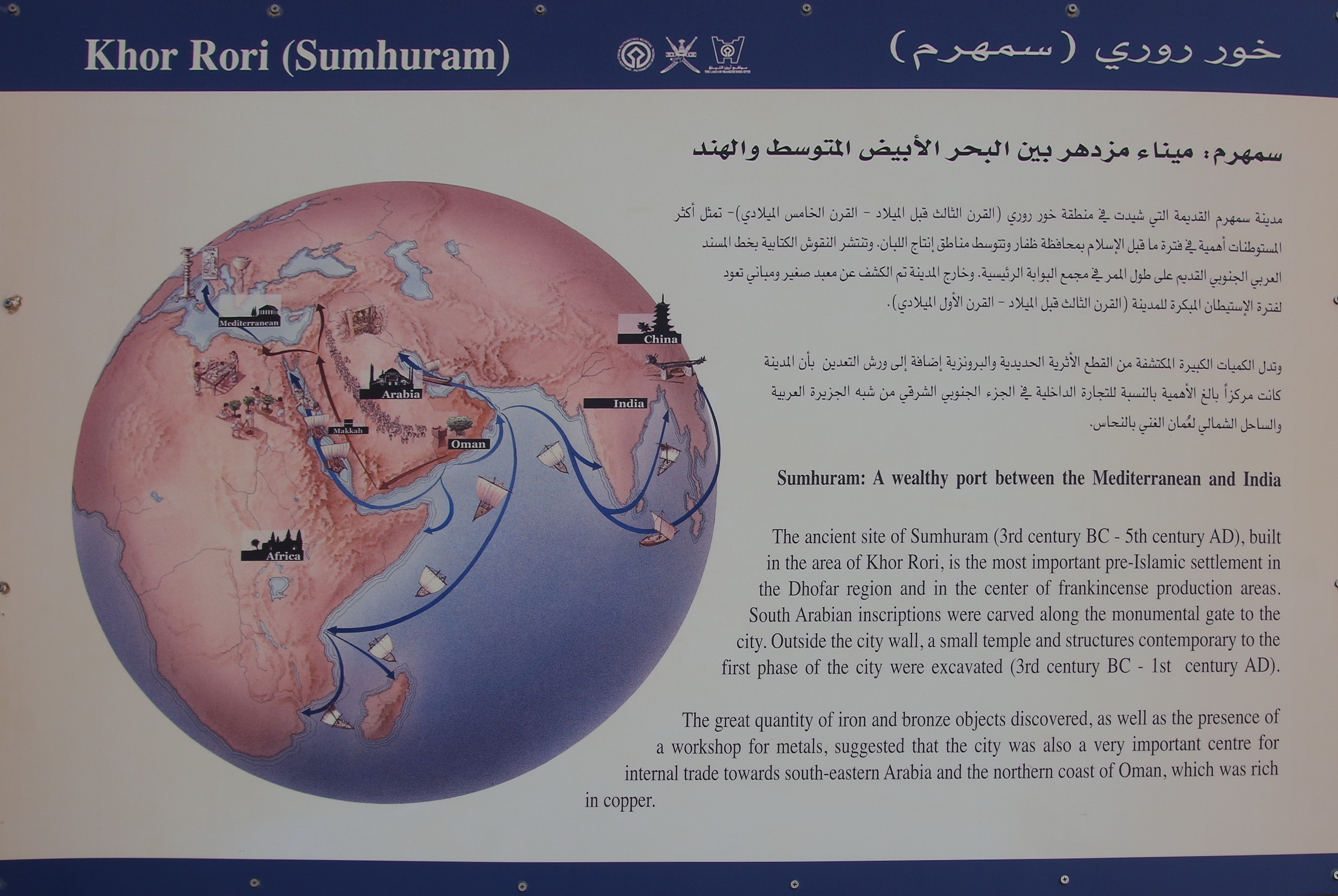
Information board of Sumhuram

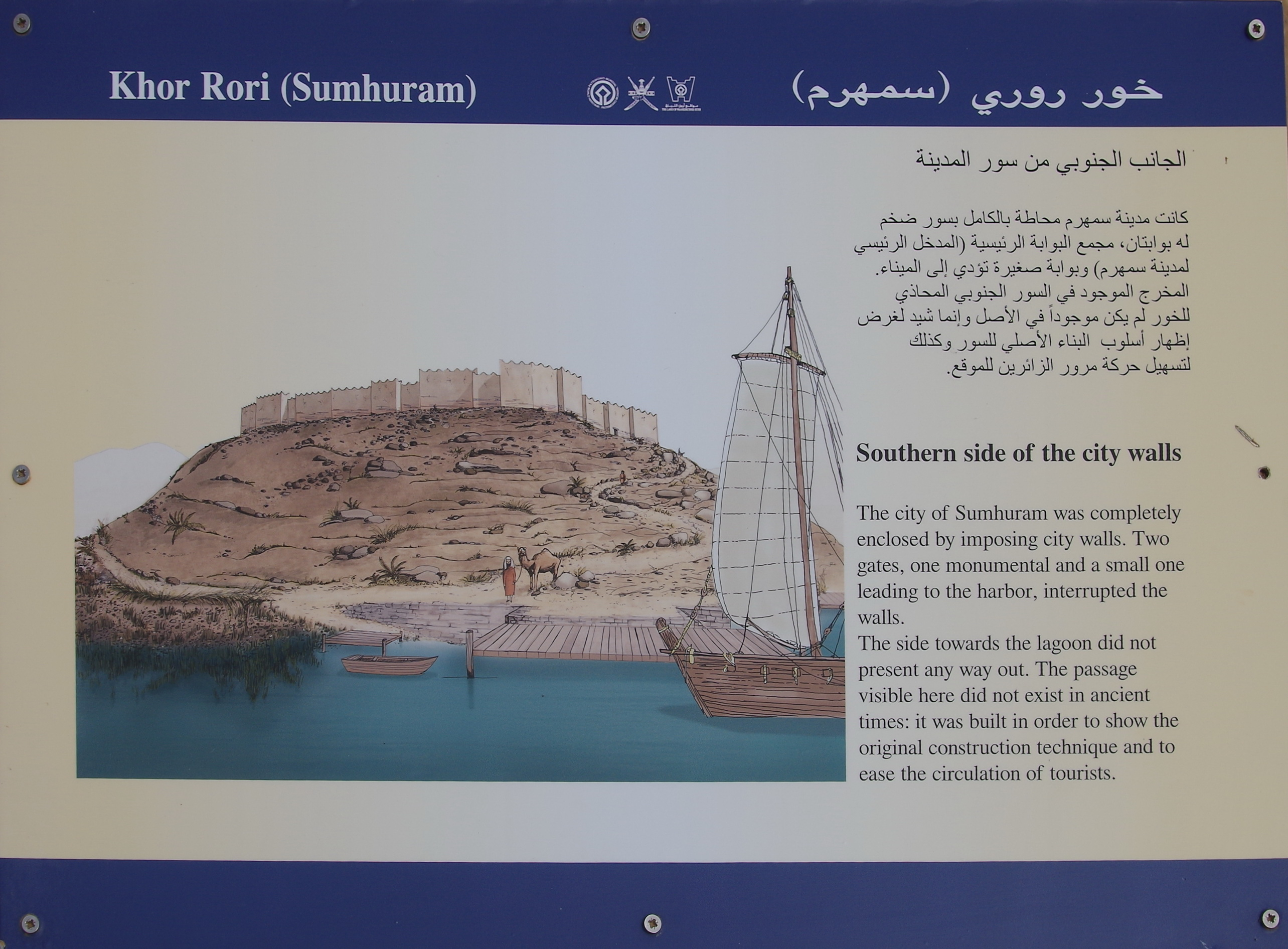
Information board of Sumhuram

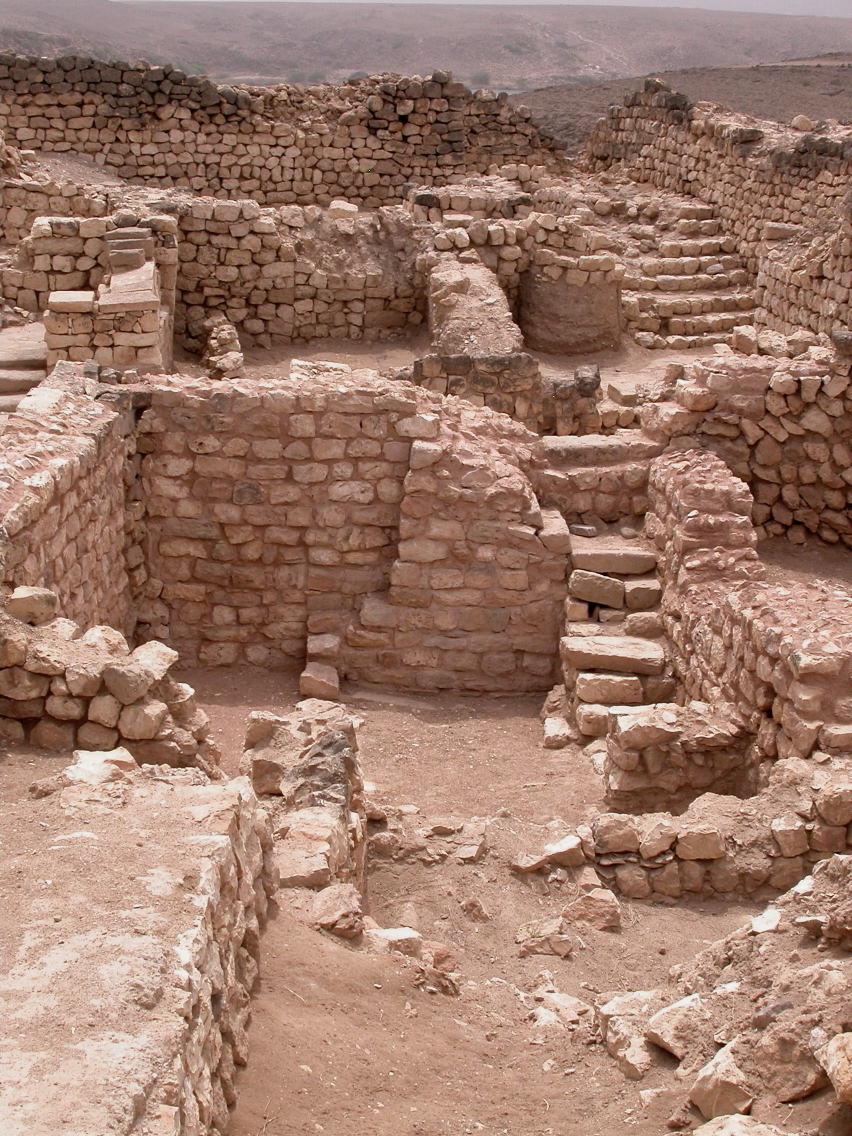
The ruins of Sumhuram

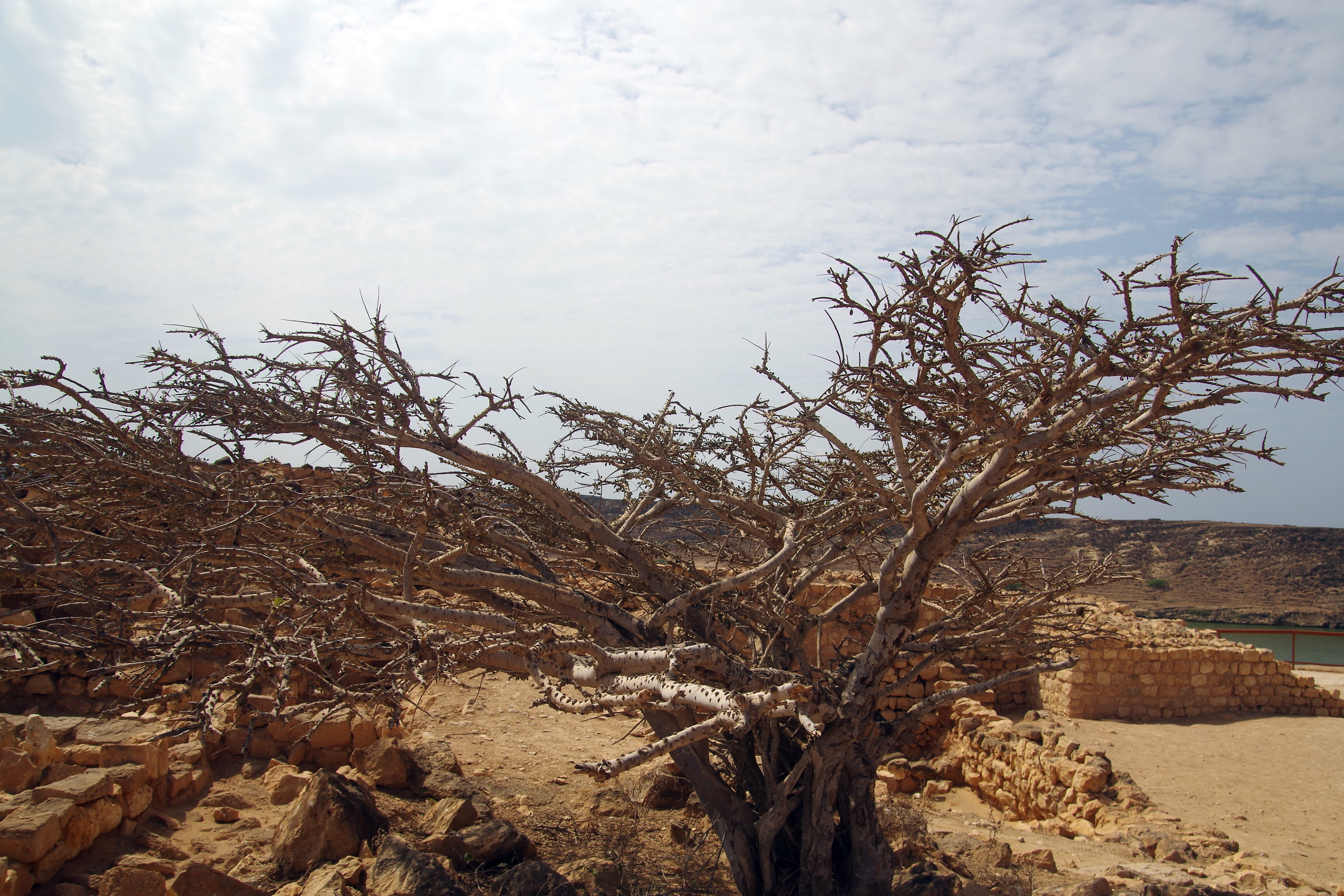
Frankincense tree in the ruins of Sumhuram
