= List of World Heritage Sites in Bahrain =

Location of World Heritage Sites in Bahrain. The Bahrain Pearling Trail site comprises 20 properties, the location of Muharraq is shown. The Dilmun Burial Mounds comprise 21 sites, the location of A'ali is shown.

The United Nations Educational, Scientific and Cultural Organization (UNESCO) designates World Heritage Sites of outstanding universal value to cultural or natural heritage which have been nominated by signatories to the 1972 UNESCO World Heritage Convention. Cultural heritage consists of monuments (such as architectural works, monumental sculptures, or inscriptions), groups of buildings, and sites (including archaeological sites). Natural features (consisting of physical and biological formations), geological and physiographical formations (including habitats of threatened species of animals and plants), and natural sites which are important from the point of view of science, conservation or natural beauty, are defined as natural heritage. Bahrain accepted the convention on May 28, 1991, making its historical sites eligible for inclusion on the list. It has three World Heritage Sites and a further six sites on the tentative list. The first site listed was the Qal'at al-Bahrain – Ancient Harbour and Capital of Dilmun in 2005, while the most recent one was the Dilmun Burial Mounds in 2019. All three sites are listed for their cultural significance. Bahrain has served on the World Heritage Committee twice.

== World Heritage Sites ==
UNESCO lists sites under ten criteria; each entry must meet at least one of the criteria. Criteria i through vi are cultural, and vii through x are natural.

World Heritage Sites
Site	Image	Location (governorate)	Year listed	UNESCO data	Description
Qal'at al-Bahrain – Ancient Harbour and Capital of Dilmun	A series of stone arches in a fort	Capital	2005	1192ter; ii, iii, iv (cultural)	The site of Qal'at al-Bahrain has been occupied since at least 2300 BCE, with successive settlements forming an artificial mound, a tell. The oldest strata are attributed to the Dilmun civilization, known from Sumerian sources. Located at a strategic location in the Persian Gulf, they traded with the Indus Valley and Mesopotamia. It continued to be an important trade port during the Tylos and Islamic periods. Fortifications from different periods have been preserved, the most prominent being the Portuguese fort from the 16th century (pictured). Excavations have uncovered remains of residential, commercial, military, and religious buildings. Minor modifications of the site boundaries took place in 2008 and 2014.
Pearling, Testimony of an Island Economy	Building in stone with windows with elaborate shadings and fences	Muharraq	2012	1364rev; iii (cultural)	Pearl harvesting was an important economy in the Persian Gulf from the 2nd to the 20th century, with its peak in the late 19th and early 20th centuries. Pearls were collected from oyster beds offshore. The pearling industry rapidly declined in the 1930s with the development of freshwater pearl cultivation from mussels in Japan. The site comprises three oyster beds, 17 buildings in Muharraq city that were related to the industry (Isa Bin Ali House pictured), parts of the seashore of the Muharraq Island, and the Bu Maher Fort.
Dilmun Burial Mounds	Dry area with several mounds	Capital, Northern, Southern	2019	1542; iii, iv (cultural)	This site comprises 21 archaeological sites with burial mounds from the early Dilmun civilization, dating from 2200 to 1750 BCE. There are six fields (A'ali pictured) with a total of over ten thousand mounds, originally built in the form of cylindrical low towers, as well as 17 royal mounds constructed as two-storey towers, some in a ziggurat-like shape. The mounds provide an insight into the development of the Dilmun society and its ruling elites. Some of the mounds have alcoves that were filled with mortuary gifts.

== Tentative list ==
In addition to sites inscribed on the World Heritage List, member states can maintain a list of tentative sites that they may consider for nomination. Nominations for the World Heritage List are only accepted if the site was previously listed on the tentative list. Bahrain lists six properties on its tentative list.

Tentative sites
Site	Image	Location (governorate)	Year listed	UNESCO criteria	Description
Khor Hamad Town Tumuli Moundfield	Museum reconstruction of a grave with bones and pottery	Northern	2001	(cultural)	The tumuli near Hamad Town were built by the Dilmun civilization. A typical tumulus was up to 4 m (13 ft) tall and was surrounded by a circular wall which is not visible anymore. The tumuli were used for men, women, and children, with apparently no discrimination. A detailed reconstruction of burial offerings is not possible due to systematic pillaging in the past. Nevertheless, archaeologists uncovered pottery fragments, jewellery, copper and stone vessels, and bones of ovicaprids and fish that were likely ritual meals. A museum reconstruction of a tumulus interior is pictured.
Barbar Temple	Archaeological site with stairs and remains of walls	Northern	2001	(cultural)	The archaeological site comprises three temples, built one atop another between the third and second millennium BCE. They were discovered and excavated in the 1950s and 1960s. The two oldest temples share architectural features with Sumerian temples. The second temple is the best preserved. It had an underground shrine centred around a natural spring, which the archaeologists interpreted as the abzu, the mythological underground freshwater ocean. The shrine was likely dedicated to Enki, the god of wisdom and fresh water. The third temple was the largest, with a 30 m (98 ft) square terrace.
Saar Heritage Park	Ancient ruins in a desert with remains of walls	Northern	2001	(cultural)	This nomination comprises a group of archaeological sites from different periods that belonged to the Dilmun civilization. They include burial complexes, temples, and remains of an early Dilmun settlement (pictured). The latter has been extensively excavated and provides insight into the life of people four millennia ago.
Hawar Islands Reserve		Southern	2001	vii, ix (natural)	The islands, located 26 km (16 mi) off mainland, are important for migrating water birds. The sea surrounding the islands has coral reefs, seagrass meadows, and is home to a population of sea cows.
Manama, City of Trade, Multiculturalism and Religious Coexistence	Skyline of Manama with traditional buildings and skyscrapers in the distance	Capital	2018	ii, iii (cultural)	Due to its strategic location in the Persian Gulf, Manama developed into an important trading hub in the 19th century. Initially flourishing from the profits of the pearl trade, modernisation of the city accelerated with the discovery of oil in the 1930s. The architecture reflects the influences of Arab, Persian, Indian, and more recently British colonial styles. Because of its diverse communities, Manama has numerous places of worship for Muslims, Christians, Hindus, and Jews.
Awali oil settlement		Southern	2019	ii, iv (cultural)	Awali was founded in the 1930s by the Bahrain Petroleum Company. It is the earliest example of an oil settlement in the Persian Gulf. It features European-style urban planning that included public buildings, homes for an international and multicultural community of oil specialists and their families, as well as local population, and leisure spaces. Some of the introduced concepts include a centralised air conditioning system, a sewage system, asphalt roads, and a mixed-gender school.
