= Thāj =

Archaeological site in the Eastern Province of Saudi Arabia

- ثَاج
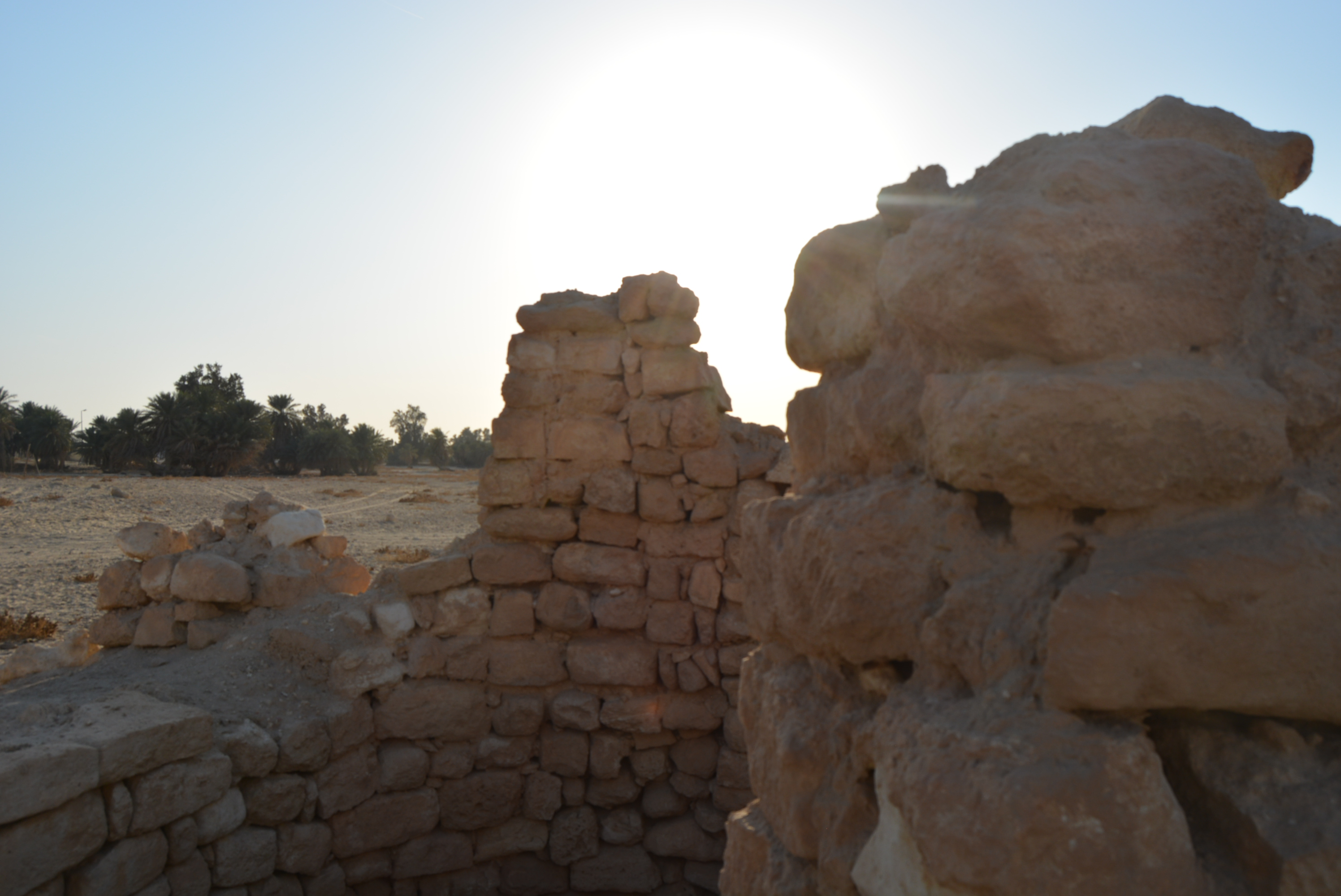
- The ruins of a well at Thāj, photographed in 2017

- Location within Saudi Arabia

General information
- Status: Free access to the public
- Location: Hellenistic Archaeological Site at Thaj, Thaj 37384, Saudi Arabia, Eastern Province, Saudi Arabia
- Coordinates: 26.8716430°N 48.7202923°E
- Completed: c. 3rd century BCE

Thāj (Arabic: ثَاج, romanized: Ṯāj) is an archaeological site and ancient town located west of Jubail in the Eastern Province, Saudi Arabia, located approximately 95 km from the coast of the Arabian Gulf. It is associated with the Hellenistic era. Many artifacts including pottery and jewellery have been discovered at Thāj, some of which are currently held in the British Museum. The site is noted for its potential identification with the lost ancient city of Gerrha.

== Location ==
The archaeological site of Thāj can be found around 90 kilometres west of Jubail at the border of a small village known as Sabkha, all within the Eastern Province of Saudi Arabia.

== History ==
=== Ancient history ===
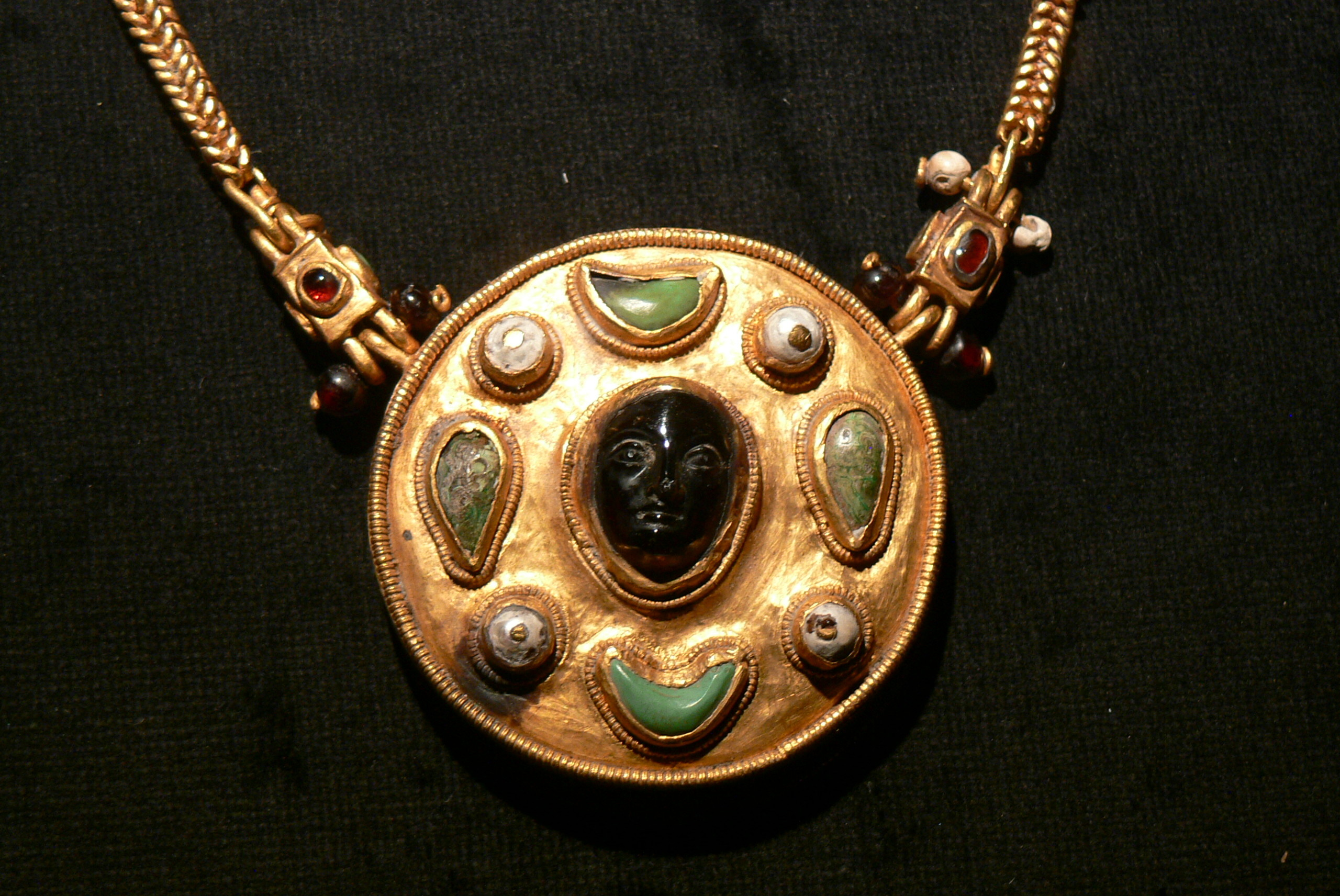
A necklace from Thaj that dates back to the 1st century CE

The city of Thāj generally dates back to the 3rd century BCE, during the Hellenistic period. The city was also an important urban centre in at least the 1st millennium BCE. During the 7th century CE, some of the remaining inhabitants accepted the call of Islam which was slowly spreading at the time.

==== Historical Mentions ====
Thaj has been identified in various historical sources spanning from the pre-Islamic era to the early Islamic period. It's mentioned as the location of a castle built by Rāshid ibn Shihāb al-Yashkurī in the late sixth century AD, suggesting it was a well-known and influential location for the Bakr ibn Wā‘il tribe before 600 AD.

During the Umayyad period, poets such as Dhū al-Rummah and al-Farazdaq referenced Thaj, indicating it was still a recognized and functioning city. It was also mentioned in 691 AD as a refuge for Mālik ibn Misma’ after a battle against ‘Abd al-Mālik ibn Marwān.

Arab geographers in the 10th and 11th centuries, including al-Hamdānī and al-Bakrī, described Thaj as a watering place and a village in the region of al-Bahrayn. By the 13th century, Yāqūt referred to it as a spring and village several days' journey from al-Baḥrayn. During this time, it primarily served as a caravan city, supplying water to travelers on the trade routes. Some scholars have suggested that Thaj may be the city of Phigeia, which appears on Ptolemy's map from the second century AD, based on its location and linguistic similarities in the local dialect.

The name Thaj entered European records in the 18th century following a confrontation between the forces of Sa‘ud ibn ‘Abd al-Aziz and Ali Pasha of Baghdad. In 1823, it was mentioned by Mengin as a village in Najd. In 1865, British official Lewis Pelly described Thaj based on local accounts as a major town of al-Ahsa, built of white stone and measuring approximately one mile in length by half a mile in breadth.

The first European to visit the site was Capt. W.H. Shakespeare. He discovered two South Arabian grave inscriptions, the first of their kind found in northern Arabia. Another inscription was found by H.R. Dickson, who visited the site in 1942 and published notes about it.

==== Writing Systems ====
Two inscribed amphoras discovered in relation to burials outside the city. The inscriptions on the amphoras are significant for understanding the use of writing systems in Eastern Arabia during the post-Achaemenid period. One inscription is in Aramaic, an internationally prestigious language of the time, likely adopted from the Achaemenid administrative system. The other inscription is in South Arabian cursive, or zabūr, marking the first attestation of this specific script in the core region of the "Hasaitic writing culture".

The presence of both Aramaic and zabūr in Thaj supports the idea that two writing systems were used concurrently in Eastern Arabia during this period. The adaptation of the South Arabian cursive script in the Gulf region is believed to have been stimulated by close trading activities between the ancient metropolis of Gerrha and commercial centers in South Arabia around 300 BC.

==== Archaeology and Finds ====
Thaj consists of a rich oasis with ancient palm groves, over twenty old wells (twelve of which are still active), and ruins of buildings made from black mud bricks. Archaeological work at the site began in the mid-20th century.

A Danish archaeological mission led by Geoffrey Bibby excavated a small area in Thaj in 1968, finding two pieces of Seleucid-period pottery and Bronze Age arrowheads. In 1976, Saudi Arabia's Department of Antiquities and Museums began a comprehensive archaeological survey of the region, including the eastern part of the Arabian Peninsula. This work, supported by Saudi Aramco, built upon the earlier Danish efforts. A joint Harvard-Saudi team in 1977 confirmed that the area had trade relations during the Hellenistic, Parthian, and Sassanian periods and that Thaj flourished during Hellenistic times (c. 215-208 BC).

Reports from these early surveys identified four major phases of settlement in the eastern Arabian Peninsula, beginning with the Ubaid period in the fifth millennium BC, followed by active trade with Mesopotamia in the third millennium BC, expanded trade across the Indian Ocean in Hellenistic times, and finally the period just before the rise of Islam.

An 85-day excavation in 1983 by a Saudi-UK team found numerous graveyards, tombstones with fragmentary Hasaitic inscriptions, small animal models made of clay, and 36 coins. This expedition concluded that settlement at Thaj may have spanned from 300 BC to AD 300 and showed cultural links to both South Arabia (through writing) and the Hellenistic world (through pottery).

Further excavations by the Department of Antiquities and Museums in 1984 uncovered more bronze coins, pottery, and Hasaitic gravestones, confirming five distinct phases of settlement and Hellenistic influence. A series of excavations between 2000 and 2006 led by Abdulhameed al-Hashash revealed that the surrounding marshes were a source of salt for export. Carbon-14 dating from this work suggested that settlement at Thaj may extend back to before 600 BC.

===== Burials Mounds =====
Surveys conducted in the 1960s around the city revealed numerous burial mounds to the west, south, and east. These mounds varied in form, with some being ring-shaped, up to 50 meters in diameter with a central hollow, while others were marked by protruding capstones or stone cists, sometimes plastered internally, that had been exposed by erosion or grave robbery.

=== Modern history ===
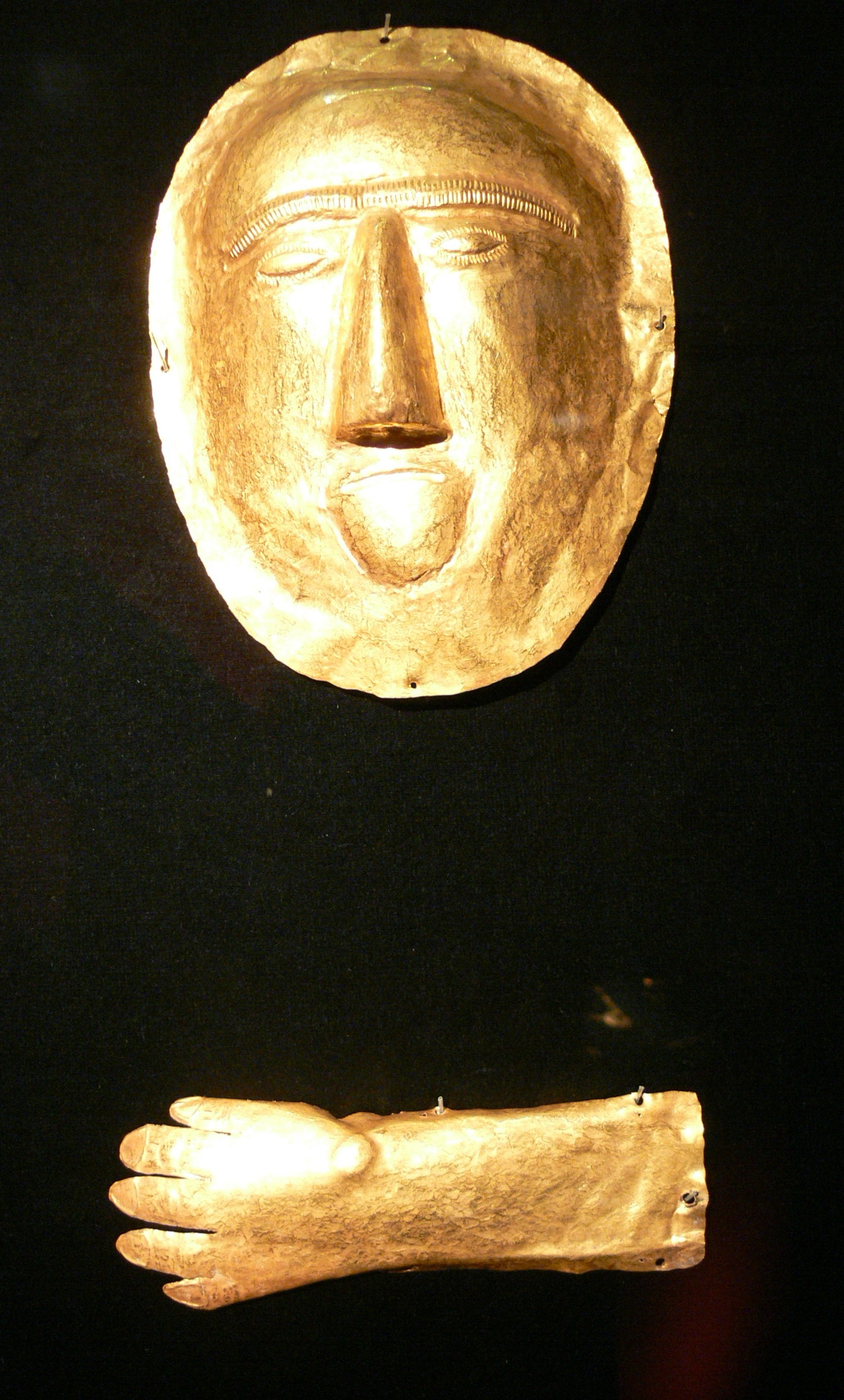
The golden funerary mask of a young girl found at Thāj

Carvings, wall reliefs, and pottery were discovered at Thāj in the 1960s and then stored in the British Museum. Then in 1968, a Danish exploration team visited the site. Later in the 1980s, excavations revealed the city of Thāj and the stone wall which surrounded it. In 2009, more excavations were conducted which revealed the grave of a young girl along with several burial goods, including a golden funerary mask.

== Identification with Gerrha ==
Many scholars have proposed that Thaj is the most likely location for the lost ancient city of Gerrha. Described by the Greek historian Strabo, Gerrha was a wealthy trading city in the northeastern Arabian Peninsula whose exact location has long been debated.

The argument for Thaj as Gerrha is based on several factors: its strategic location on the trade road, its substantial size, and the presence of numerous castles and diverse archaeological remains. The discovery of Hasaitic inscriptions and coins minted by local rulers further supports the theory that Thaj was a significant political and commercial center during the period when Gerrha was known to have flourished.

== See also ==
- Ancient towns in Saudi Arabia
- Cities of the ancient Near East
- Dhahran Burial Mounds
- Dilmun Burial Mounds
- Jawan Tomb
