= Gerrha =

Archaeological site in Saudi Arabia

Gerrha Kingdom جرهاء
- c. 650 BC–c. 300 AD
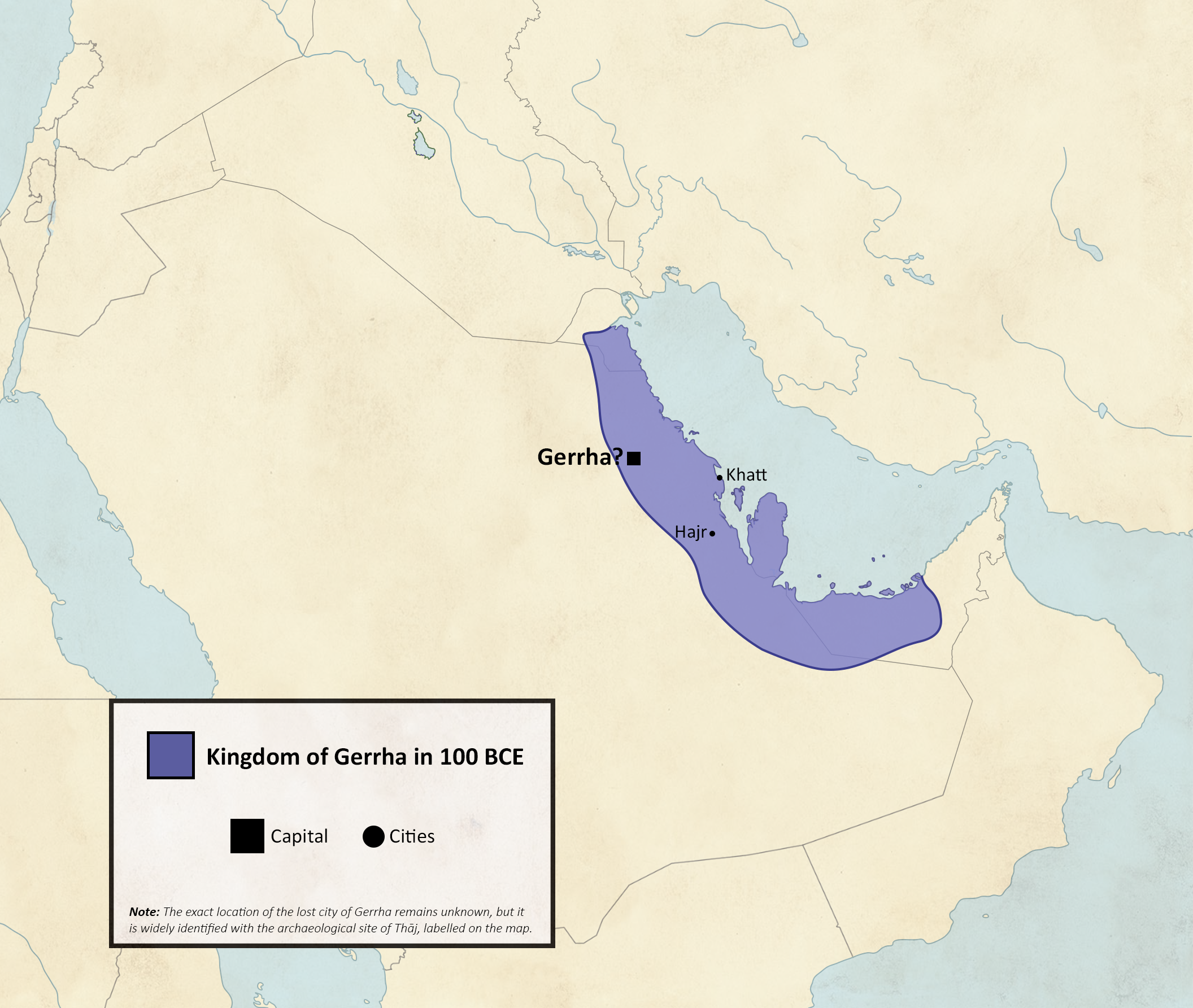
- Gerrha Kingdom in 100 BCE
- Capital: Gerrha
- Common languages: Hasaitic (Old Arabic)
- Religion: Arab polytheism
- Government: Monarchy
- King
  - c. 225-220BC: Abi'el
  - c. 220-204BC: Abyatha
  - c. 150BC: Harithat
- History
  - Established: c. 650 BC
  - Annexed by the Sasanian Empire: c. 300 AD
Preceded by	Succeeded by
Dilmun	Sasanian Empire

Gerrha (Koine Greek: Γέρρα, romanized: Gérrha) was an ancient and renowned city within Eastern Arabia, on the west side of the Persian Gulf. Known from Greek sources, it has been identified with a few candidate archaeological sites in Eastern Arabia, with the main candidates being Hagar (modern-day Hofuf) and Thaj.

In the aftermath of the conquests of Alexander the Great and the subsequent Seleucid Empire in the region, Gerrha became a site of central importance in the Hellenistic world and the major site of trading with Arabia in the Persian Gulf. It was a major source of Arabian aromatics and for the transport of goods from India.

== Description ==
Gerrha was located at or near the Persian Gulf, possessing a port and an inland town. A detailed description of the city was offered by the geographer Strabo:

After sailing along the [east] coast of Arabia [from the outlet of the Euphrates] for a distance of 2400 stadia [c.380 km] one comes to Gerrha, a city situated on a deep gulf. It is inhabited by Chaldaeans, exiles from Babylon. The soil contains salt and the people live in houses made of salt; and since flakes of salt continually scale off, owing to the scorching heat of the rays of the sun, and fall away, the people frequently sprinkle the houses with water and thus keep the walls firm. The city is 200 stadia [c.32 km] distant from the sea; and the Gerrhaeans traffic by land, for the most part, in the Arabian merchandise and aromatics. However Aristobulus says, on the contrary, that the Gerrhaeans import most of their cargoes on rafts to Babylonia, and thence sail up the Euphrates with them, and then convey them by land to all parts of the country.

== History ==
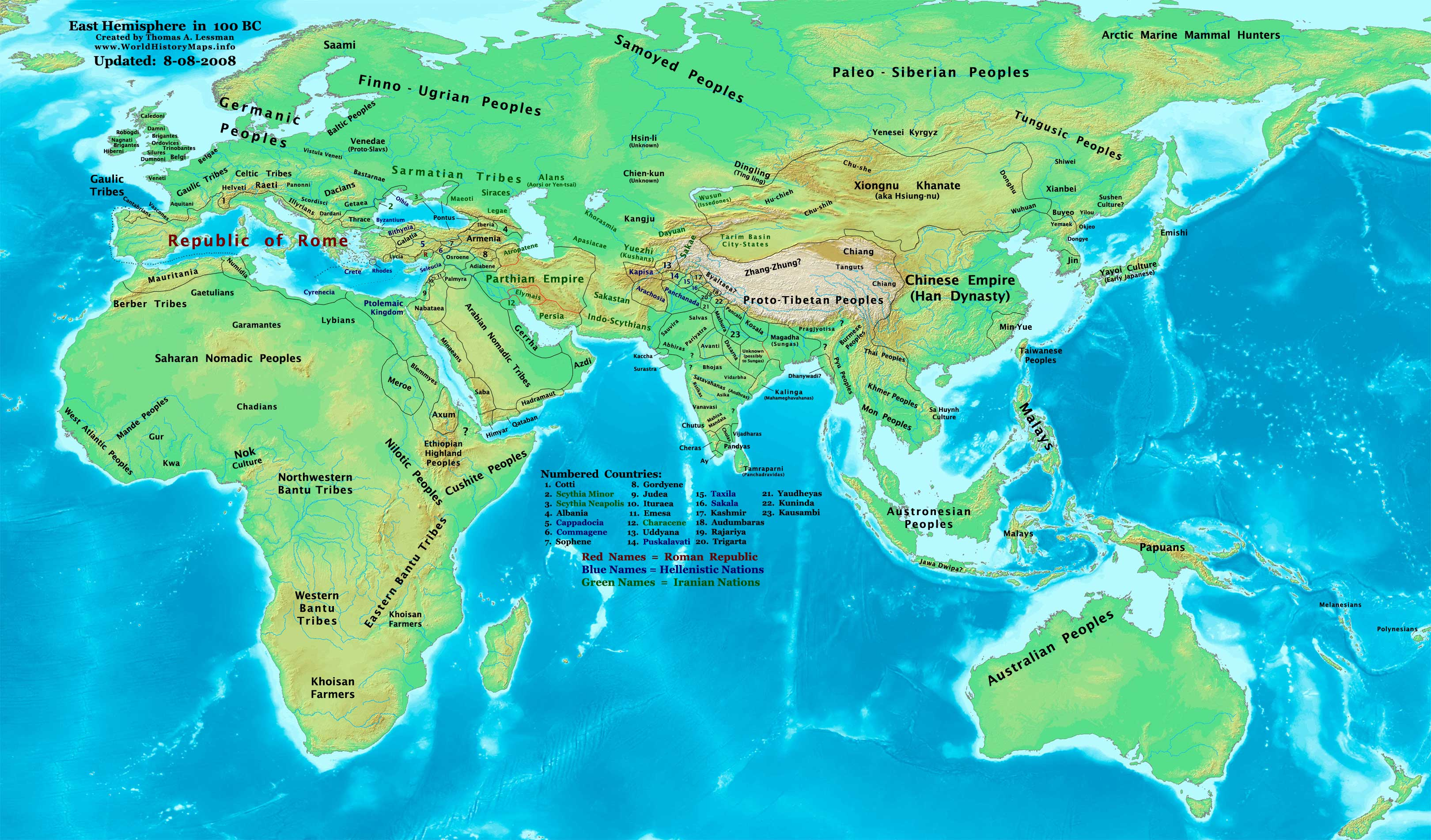
Kingdom of Gerrha in 100 BC.

At first, Gerrha's trade exports moved to Babylonia and transports moved by sea. However, soon during or after the lifetime of Alexander the Great, Gerrha's transports began moving in the direction of Egypt and Syria and the mode of transport shifted from by sea to by land. Gerrhean incense is reported as an ingredient in Greek poison and it was also an essential item on some discovered shopping lists. Some Gerrheans have been documented in the West, like Taymallat of Gerrha, who made some offerings in the Aegean island of Delos.

Polybius reports that the Seleucid emperor Antiochus III sailed to Gerrha in 205 BC. The Gerrhaeans petitioned, and were granted by Antiochous, the rite to practice their religious customs. Robert Hoyland has suggested that a likely factor in this expedition was for Antiochus to use a show of force to get the Gerrhaeans to direct more of their trade through his territory. As the Seleucid domain expanded through military victories against the Ptolemies, Gerrha's trading partners also expanded to include Palestine, Syria, and the Nabataeans.

By the first and second centuries AD, Gerrha as a city begins to decline. The exact causes are not known but one possibility is that the new Parthian Empire began to take over its trade routes with India. As Gerrha's influence declined, an encroachment of Arab tribes into the region also took place.

The city of Gerrha was taken by the Qarmatians at the end of the ninth century.

== Location and etymology ==
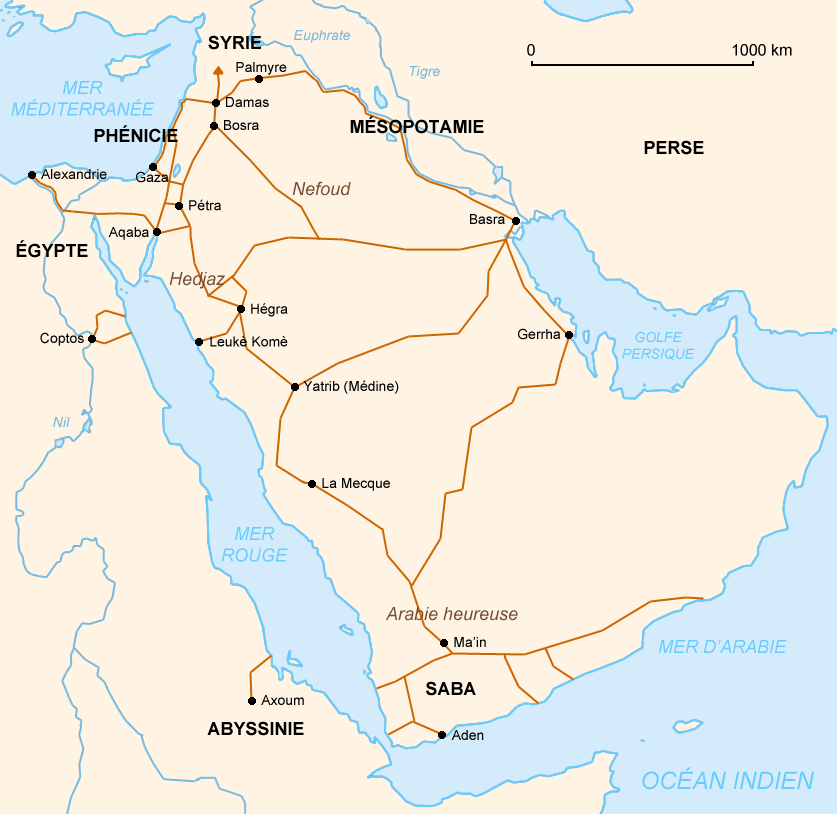
Gerrha and its neighbors in AD 1.

To the ancient Greeks, Eastern Arabia (now al-Ahsa Governorate) was known as Gerrha after its capital city. Gerrha was a Greek adaptation of the ancient name; it is now Hofuf, the name of the largest city of Bahrayn or al-Ḥasāʾ, premodern names for Eastern Arabia, which now encompass the Eastern Province and al-Aḥsāʾ Governorate of Saudi Arabia. Bahrayn was also known as Hagar or Gerrha in the Hellenistic period. Other English spellings are Hajar Hufuf and Hajar Hasa' Hajarah.

The name Hagar is not to be confused with Hegra near the Red Sea. Abu Muhammad al-Hasan al-Hamdani says the etymology of Hajar means ‘large village’ in the Himyaritic language.

The researcher Abdulkhaliq Al Janbi argued in his book that Gerrha was most likely the ancient city of Hajar, located in modern-day Al-Ahsa, Saudi Arabia. Al-Janbi's theory is the most widely accepted one by modern scholars, although there are some difficulties with this argument, given that the al-Ahsa Oasis is 60 kilometres (37 mi) inland and thus less likely to be the starting point for a trade route, making a location within the archipelago of islands comprising Bahrain, particularly the main island of Bahrain itself, another possibility.

Another location suggested as Gerrha is Thāj, an archaeological site and ancient town located west of Jubail in Eastern Province, located approximately 95 km from the coast of the Persian Gulf.

== See also ==
- Chaldea
- Eastern Arabia
- Uqair, an ancient fort suggested by some historians as the location of Gerrha

== Sources ==
- Bibby, Geoffrey (1970). Looking for Dilmun. Collins, London. ISBN 0-00-211475-5.
- Hoyland, Robert (2002). Arabia and the Arabs: From the Bronze Age to the Coming of Islam. Routledge.
- Potts, Daniel (1984). "Thaj and the Location of Gerrha". Proceedings of the Seminar for Arabian Studies. 14: 87–91.
