= Hasaitic =

Ancient North Arabian dialect

- Hasaean
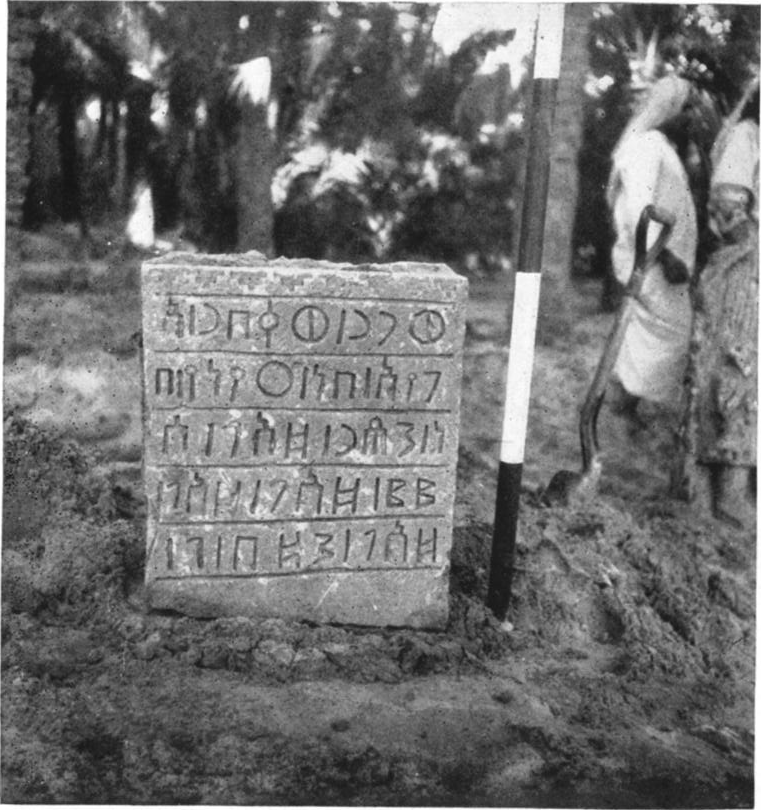
- Ancient funerary inscription tablet written in Hasaitic, 5th-6th century CE. Tarout Island, Saudi Arabia.
- Region: Arabia
- Extinct: marginalized by Classical Arabic from the 7th century
- Language family: Afro-Asiatic: Semitic; West Semitic; Central Semitic; North Arabian?; Old Arabic; Hasaitic
- Writing system: Monumental South Arabian script

Language codes
- ISO 639-3: –
- Glottolog: hasa1249

Hasaitic is an Ancient North Arabian dialect attested in inscriptions in the Eastern Province of Saudi Arabia at Thaj, Hinna, Qatif, Ras Tanura, Abqaiq in the al-Hasa region, Ayn Jawan, Mileiha and at Uruk. It is written in the Monumental South Arabian script and dates from the 5th to 2nd centuries BC.
