= Dictionary of Sydney =

Encyclopaedia on the history of Sydney

The Dictionary of Sydney is a digital humanities project to produce an online, expert-written encyclopaedia of all aspects of the history of Sydney.

== Description ==
The Dictionary is a partnership between the City of Sydney, the University of Sydney, the University of Technology Sydney, the State Library of New South Wales and the State Records Authority of New South Wales. It began in 2007 with Australian Research Council funding and launched on 5 November 2009.

Geographically, the Dictionary of Sydney includes the whole Sydney basin and chronologically spans the years from the earliest human habitation to the present. It also invited historical contributions from disciplines such as archaeology, sociology, literary studies, historical geography and cultural studies.

Heurist, developed by the University of Sydney was the underlying technology for the project. The Dictionary of Sydney won an Energy Australia National Trust Heritage Award for Interpretation and Presentation in April 2010.

The site now resides at the State Library of New South Wales on the Drupal platform.

The Dictionary was archived in 2021.

== Contributors ==
Contributions are sourced from hundreds of academics, writers and researchers. Notable contributors include Keith Vincent Smith, with 15 entries, including entries on Bennelong and Pemulwuy.
