= Dhahran Burial Mounds =

Archeological site in Saudi Arabia

- مدافن الظهران (Arabic)
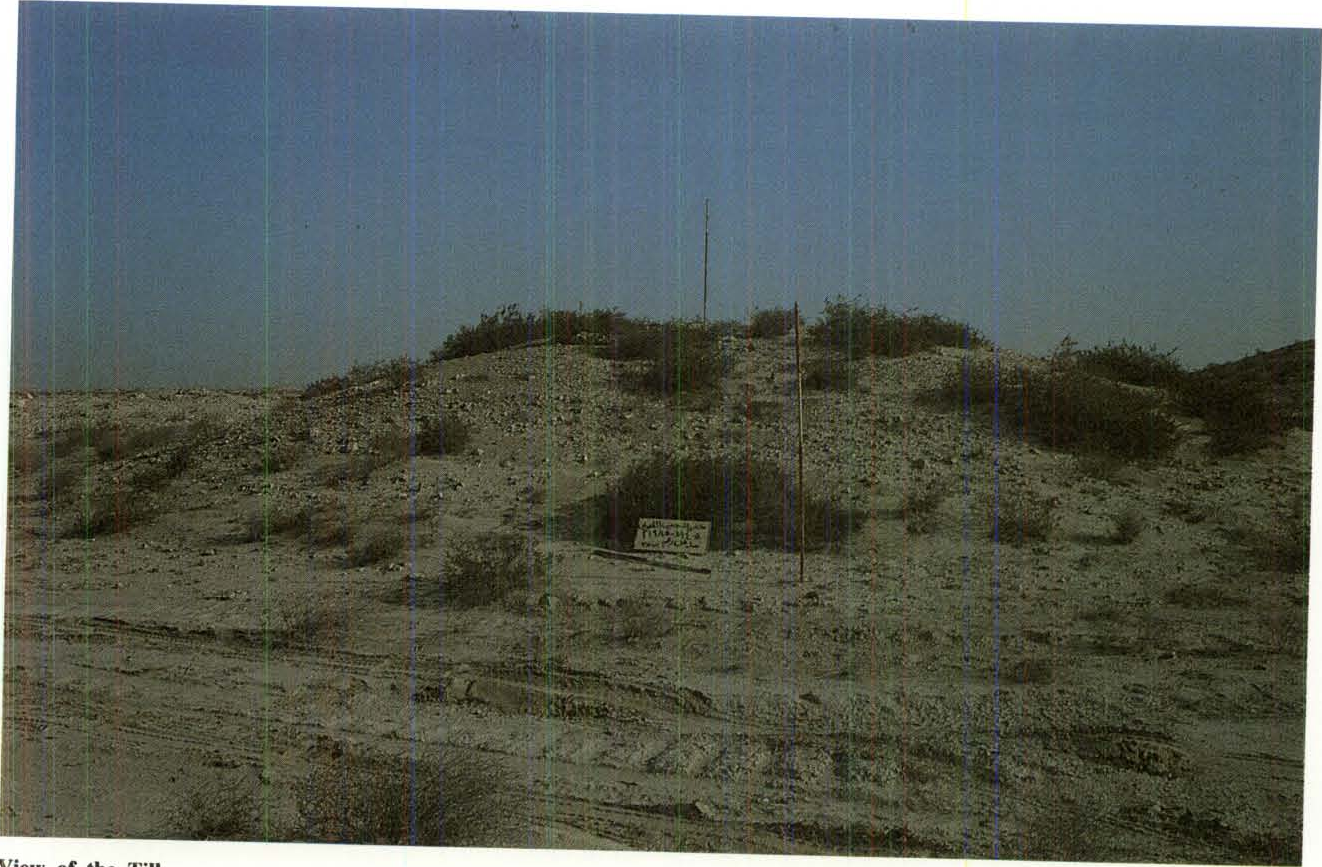
- Type: tomb
- Location: Dhahran, Saudi Arabia

The Dhahran Burial Mounds (Arabic: مدافن الظهران) is an Arabian archaeological site located in the southern part of Dhahran, Saudi Arabia. The site comprises a large settlement dating back to the third millennium BCE, featuring approximately 900 burial mounds. An ancient trade route, which connected the site to the Ain Al-Sayh settlement in the south and likely to a seaport known as Dhahran, runs through the site.

== Discovery and excavation ==
The site was first discovered by archaeologist Peter Bruce Cornwall in 1940, who published his findings in The Geographical Journal in 1946. Cornwall documented circular stone structures topped by thousands of Bronze Age burial mounds, attributing them to the Dilmun civilization known for trading with Sumerians and Assyrians.

In 1962, Danish archaeologist Geoffrey Bibby conducted studies revealing cultural similarities and historical synchronicity between the Dhahran burial mounds and Bahrain Mounds.

The Saudi Department of Antiquities and Museums conducted a comprehensive archaeological survey of the area in 1977 as part of the "Third Millennium BCE Survey Project," documenting approximately 1,500 burial mounds. Due to urban expansion threats, rescue excavations were carried out in 1983, during which 900 mounds were documented and 22 were excavated. Subsequent excavations explored 14 and 9 mounds respectively. These excavations focused on studying the mounds' shapes, orientations, sizes, and circular walls, with some mounds being restored as samples.

== Site ==
=== Physical characteristics ===
The site covers an area of approximately 2×8 kilometers. The ancient inhabitants chose elevated locations for burials to prevent flooding and erosion. Excavations revealed multiple burial patterns, including collective tombs containing up to seventeen burials, and individual tombs.

The mounds are spaced between two and ten meters apart in dense areas, with heights ranging from 0.5 to 5 meters and radii from 2 to 20 meters, though most measure between 4 and 8 meters. They are dome-shaped and covered with smooth stones, now featuring wild grass growth.

=== Tomb architecture ===
A typical tomb consists of a rectangular chamber measuring 2–4 meters in length with a height of up to 2 meters. Bodies were placed inside the chamber, which was then sealed with stones and covered with sand to form a mound. Some tombs feature side chambers containing burned offerings, including camel remains. The tombs generally orient east to west, with varying degrees of inclination, possibly related to solar movements.

=== Current status ===
Some portion of the site now lies within the King Abdulaziz Air Base (formerly Dhahran Airport) and Saudi Aramco's industrial and urban expansion areas.

== Archaeological findings ==
Excavations of sixty tombs within the former Dhahran Airport area revealed various artifacts, though many tombs showed evidence of looting across different periods. The discovered materials span three historical periods from 2750 BCE to 600 CE, including:

=== Pottery ===
Significant quantities of "Dilmun pottery" similar to those found in Bahrain burials were discovered, along with locally manufactured pieces. These included cylindrical jars, pear-shaped vessels, ribbed and barbarian pottery, burned grey pottery, and bowls. Painted pottery and various types of beads were also found.

=== Other artifacts ===
- Stone vessels
- Ostrich eggshell containers
- Tar-coated baskets
- Ivory implements
- Incense burners
- Ten seals, including a Jemdet Nasr seal, featuring geometric and animal designs
- Jewelry made from gold, silver, copper, ivory, and shells
- Stone tools including arrowheads, spears, and scrapers used for hunting and agriculture

== Cultural significance ==
The discoveries indicate strong cultural, economic, and civilizational connections across the Gulf region, particularly with the Dilmun civilization. The burial practices, including the placement of vessels, treasures, and offerings with the deceased, reflect significant religious customs of the period.

== See also ==
- Dilmun Burial Mounds
- Jawan Tomb
- Thaj

== Gallery ==
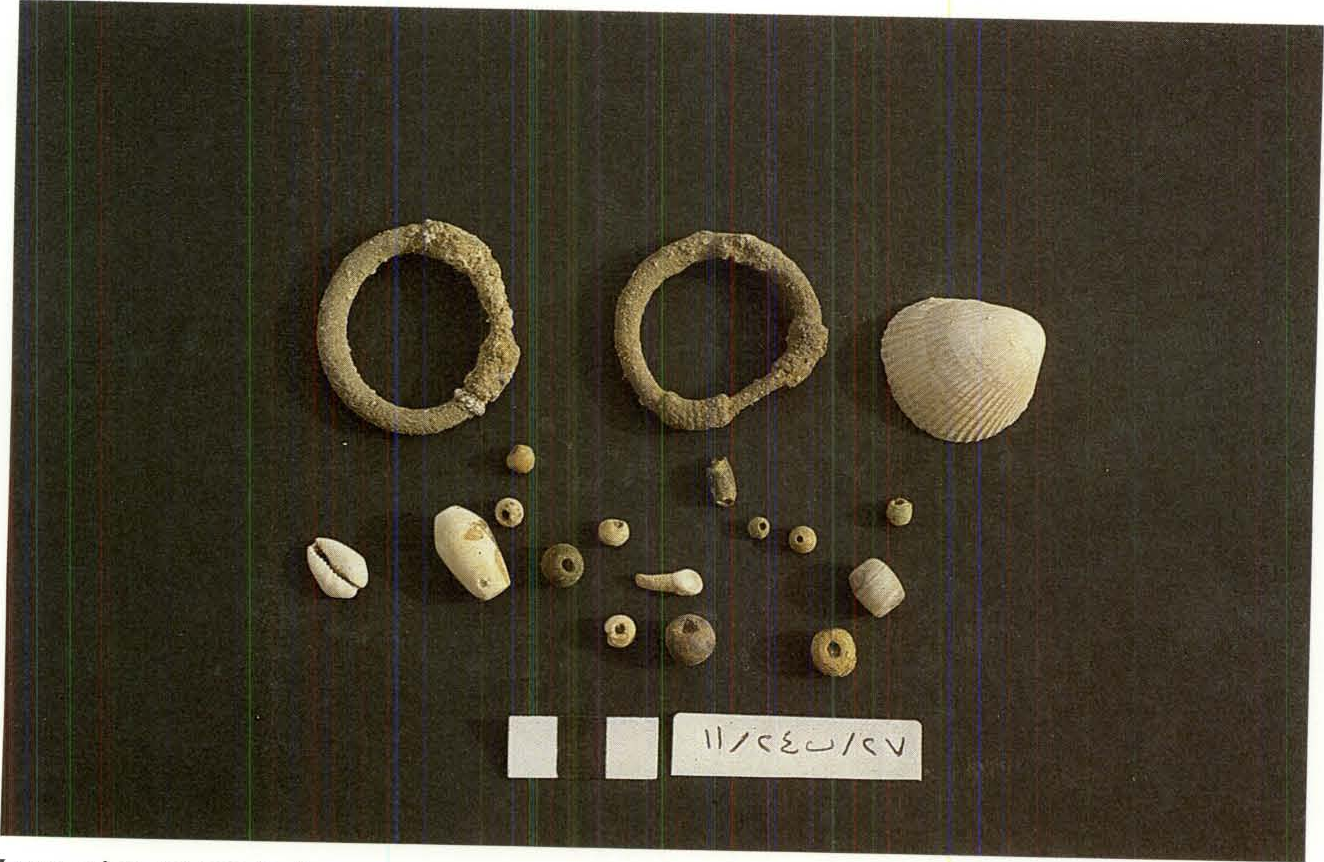

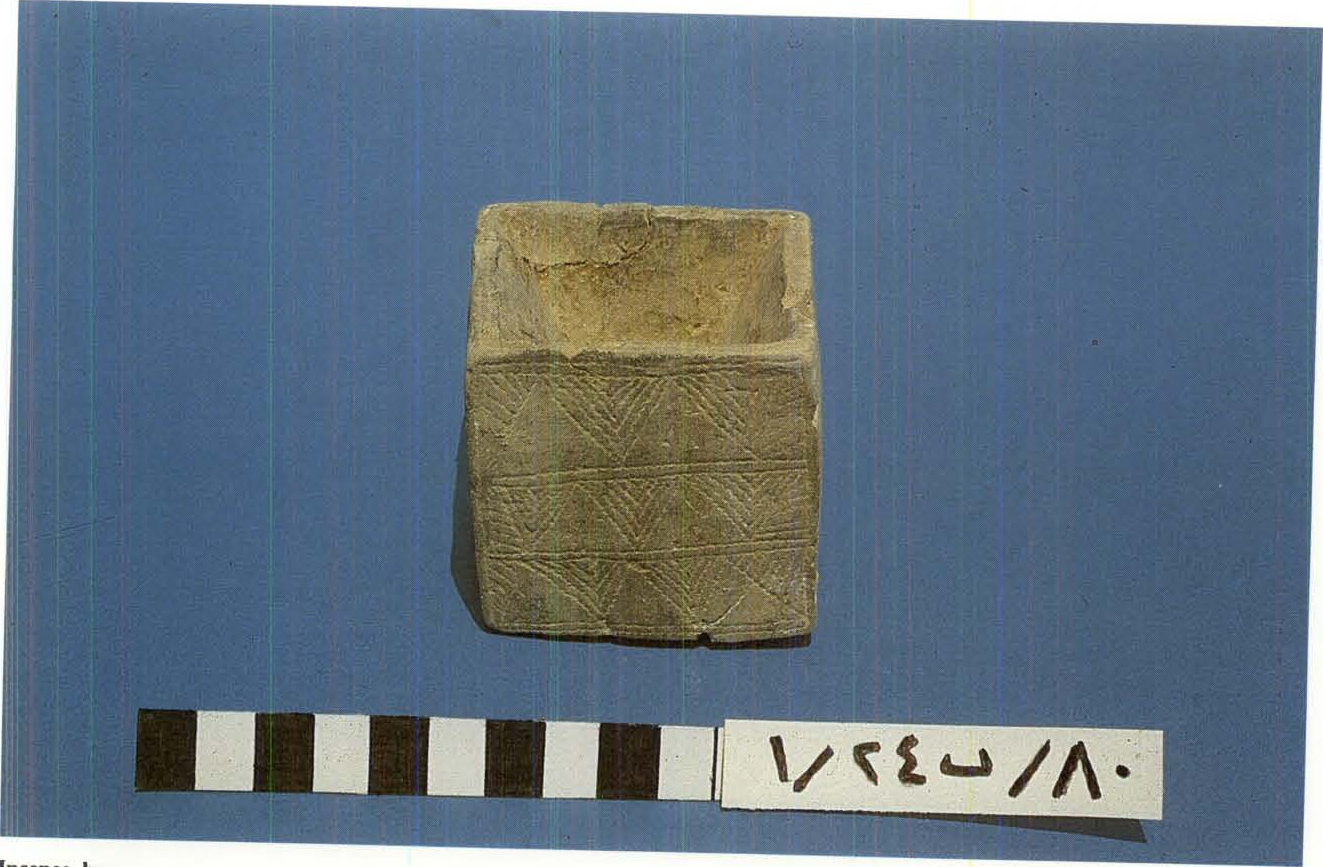

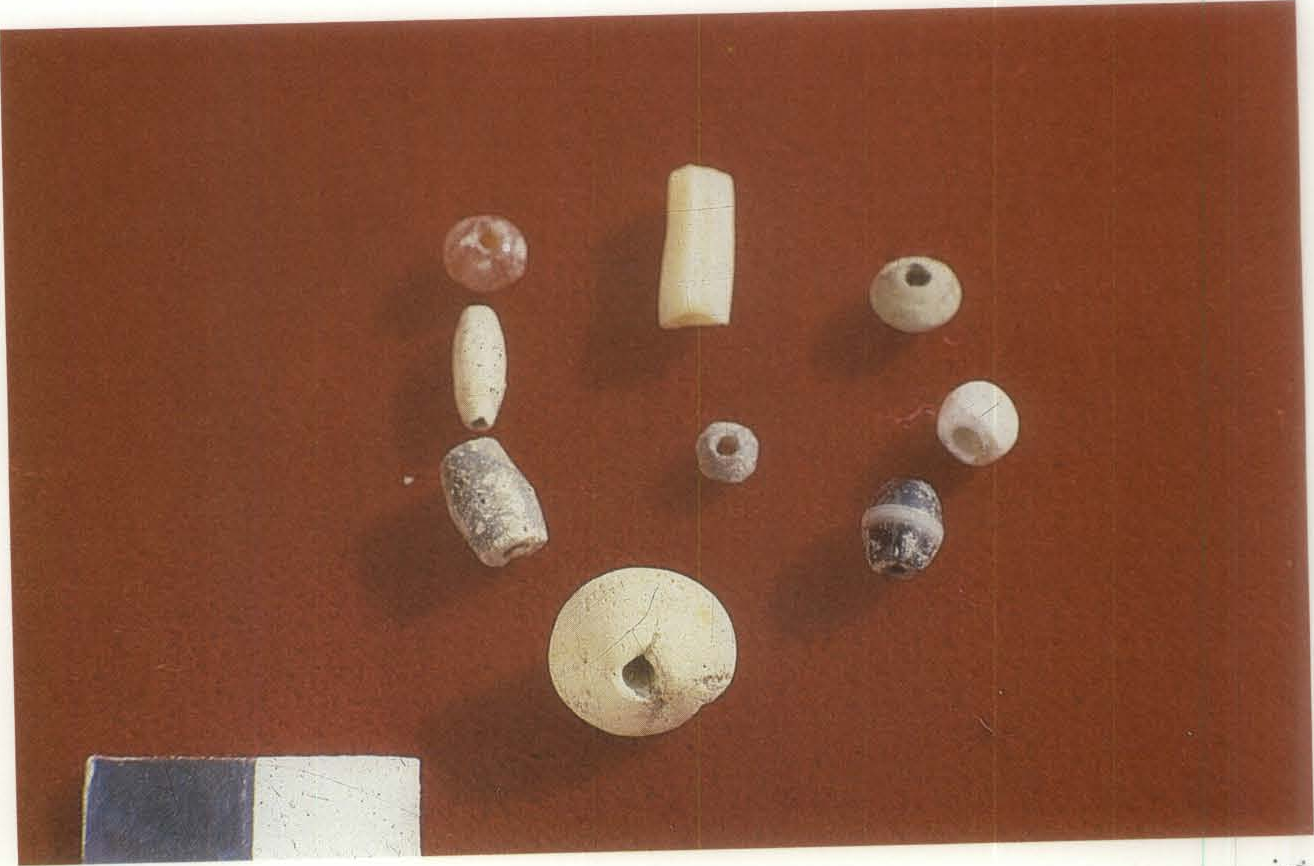

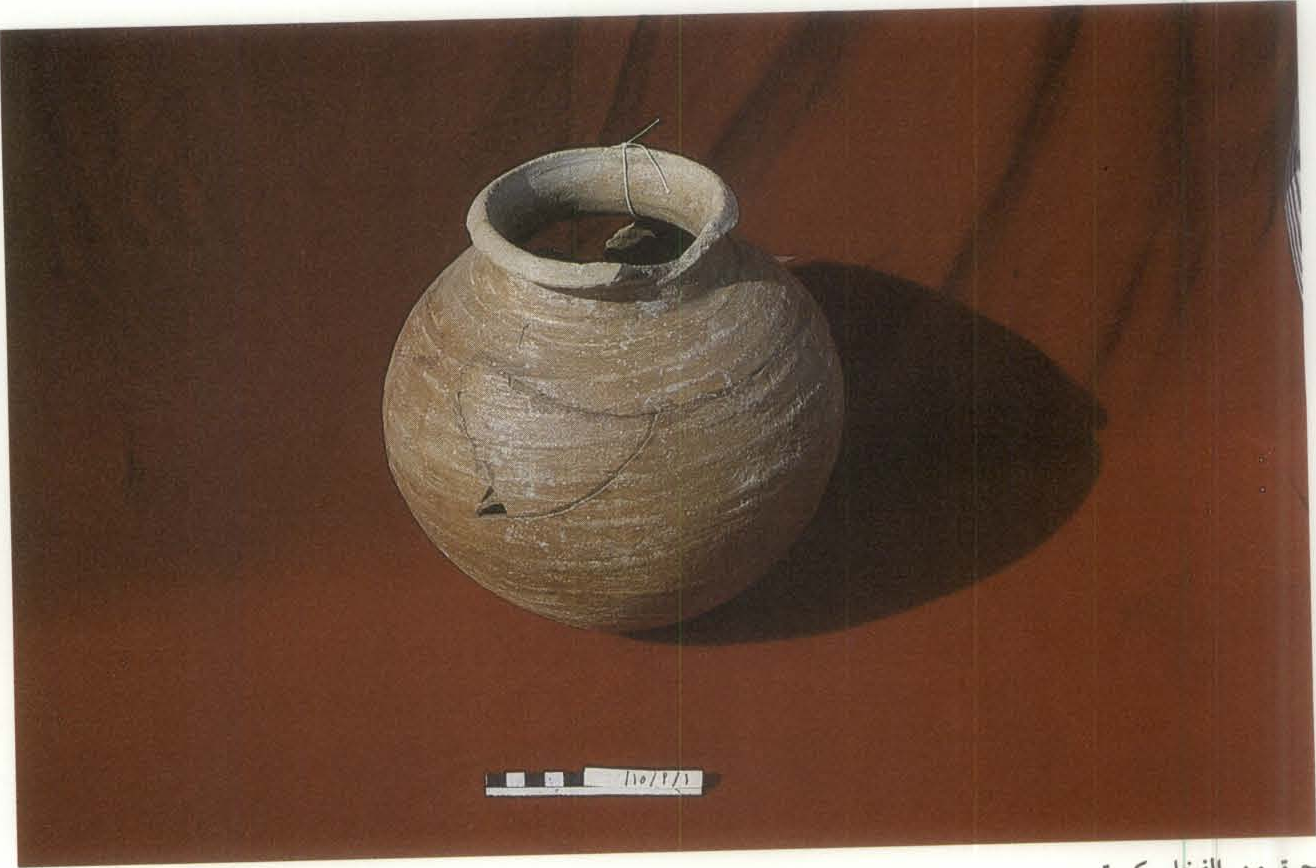

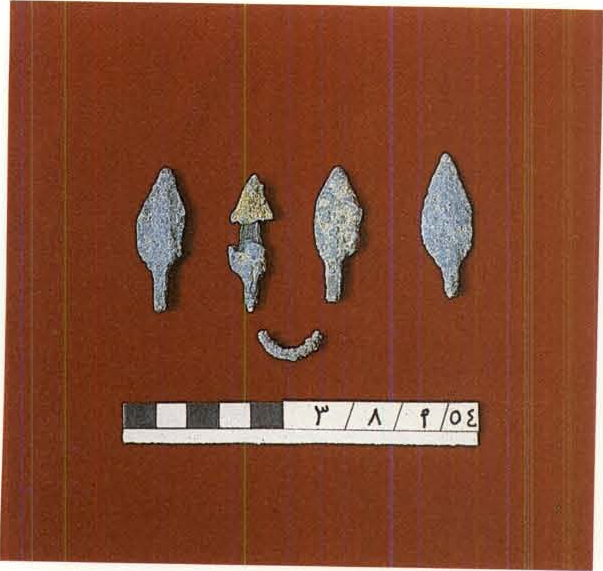

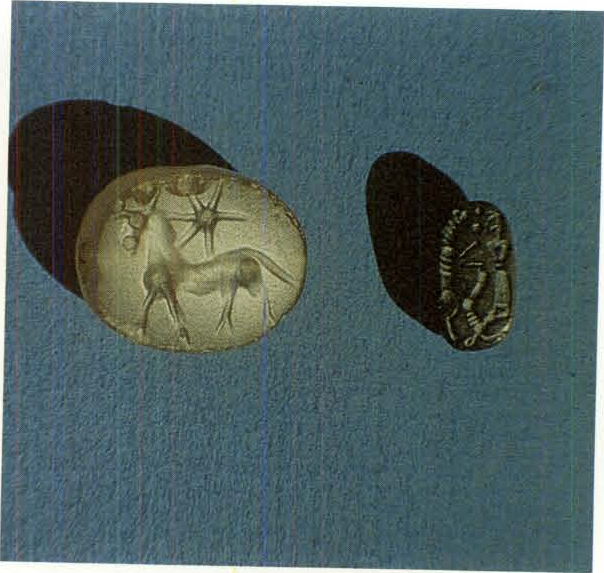

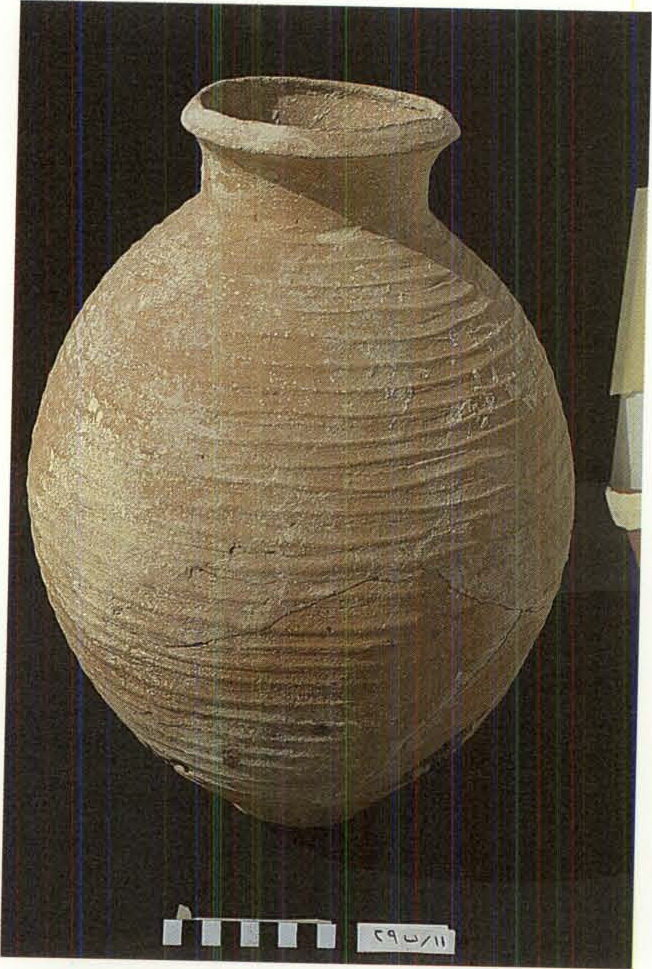

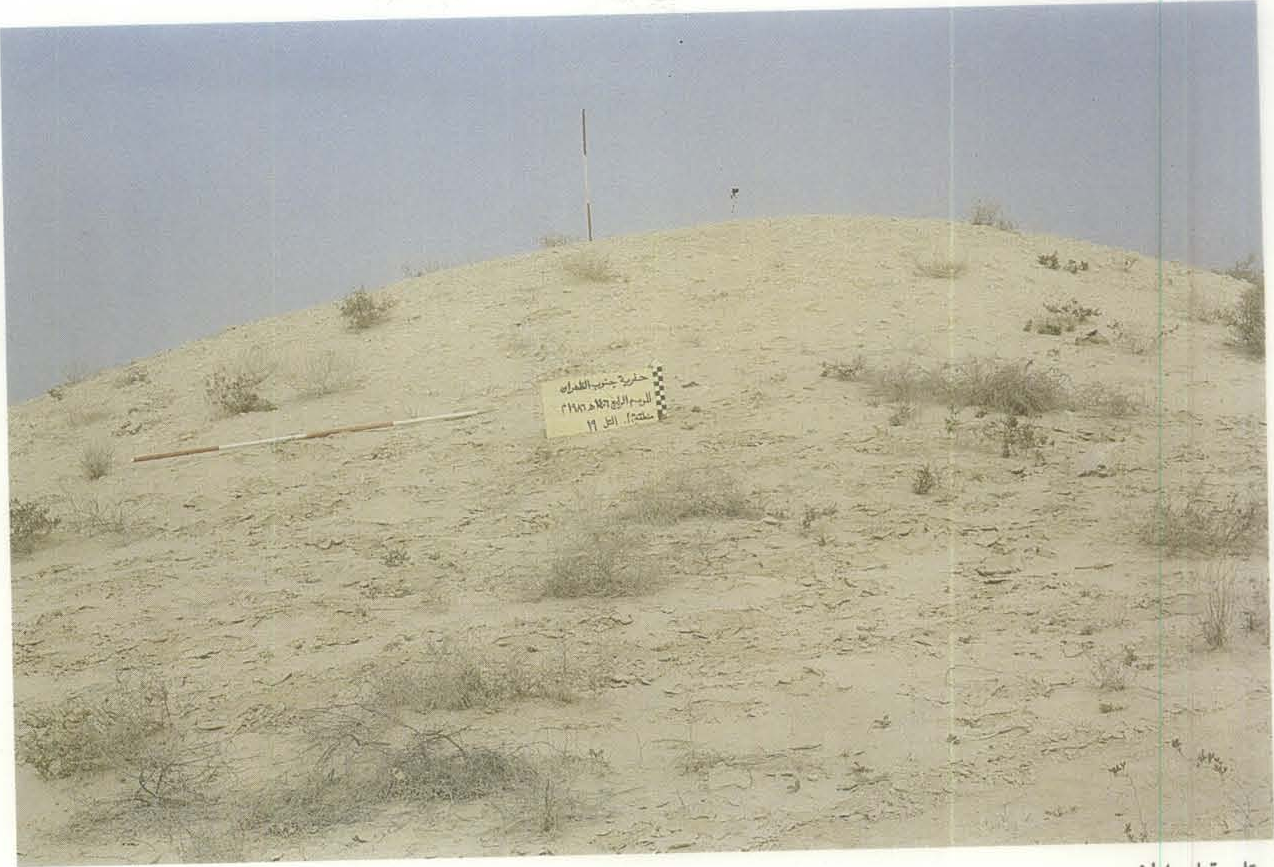

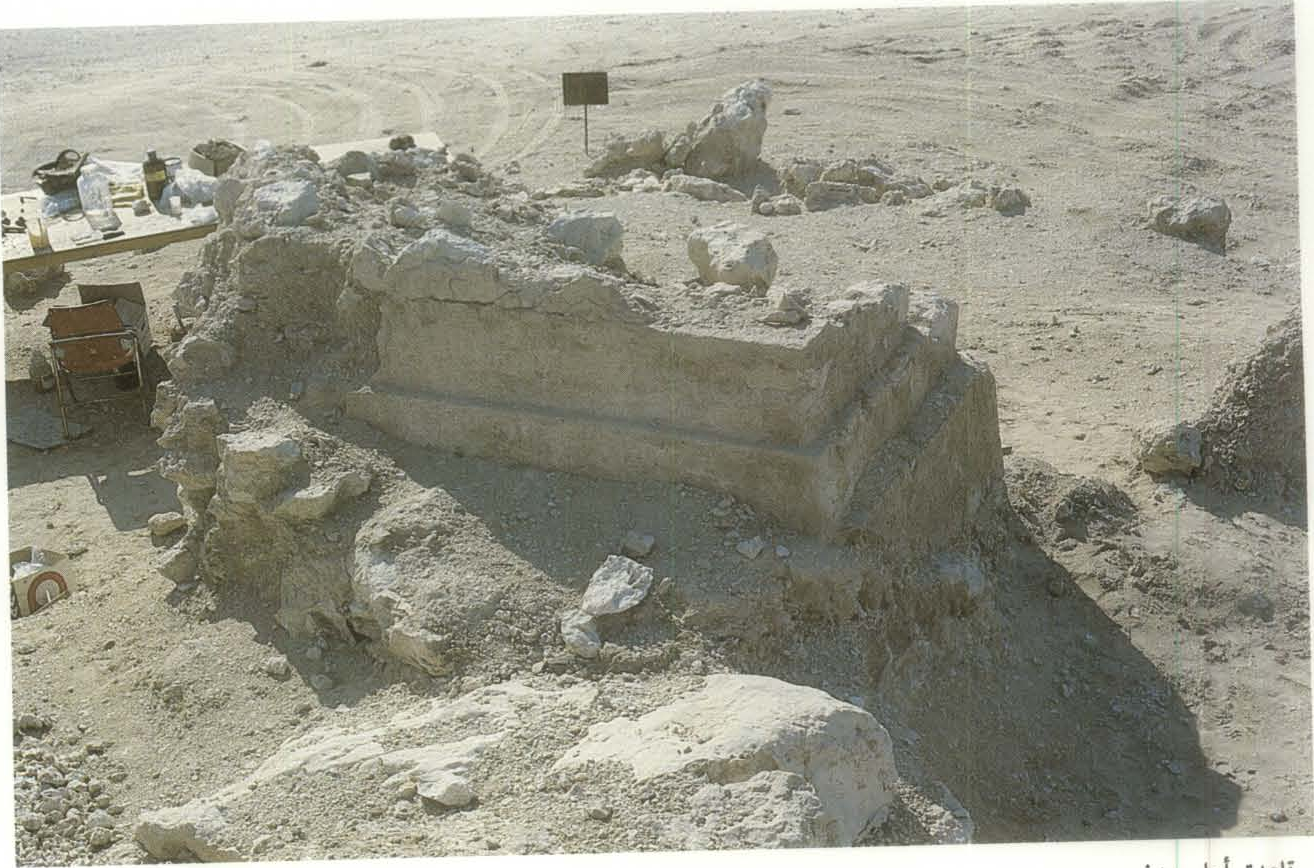

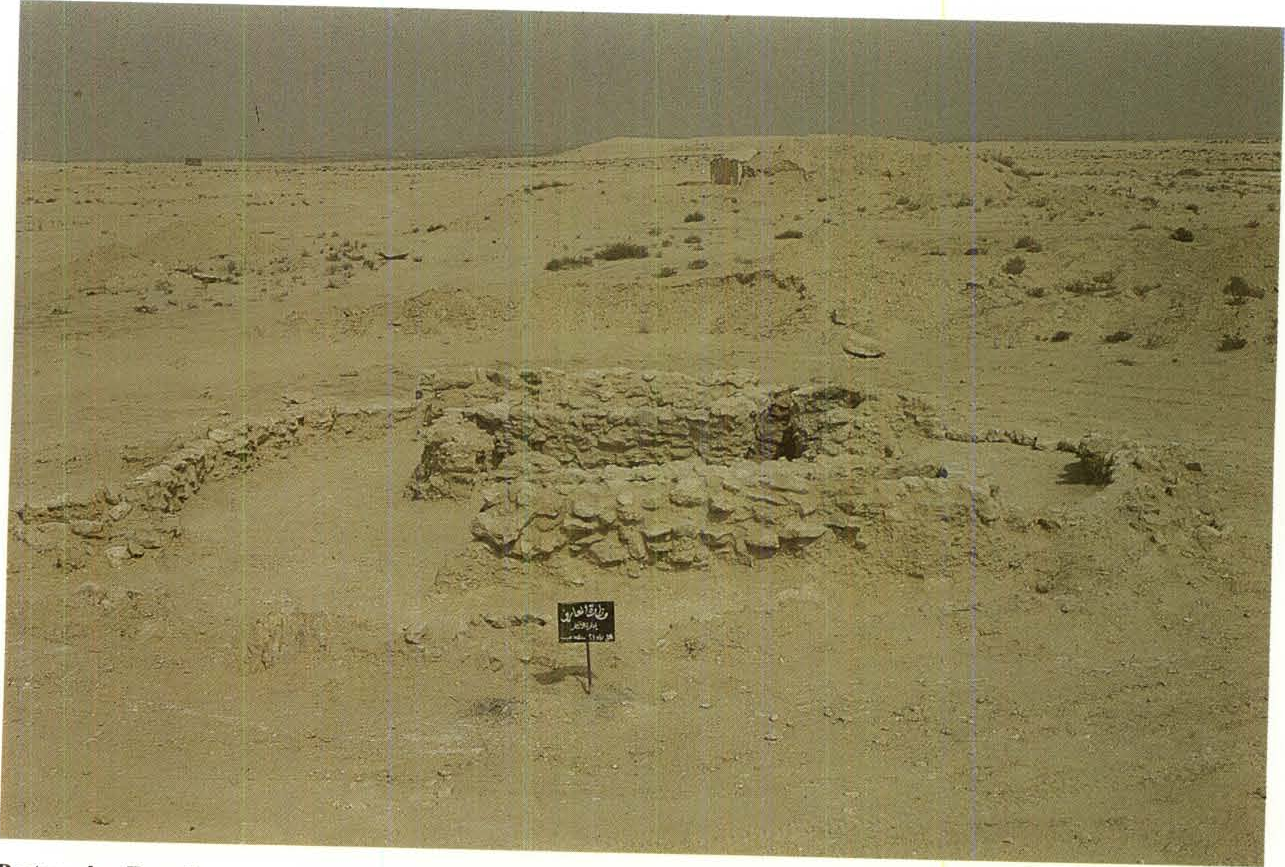

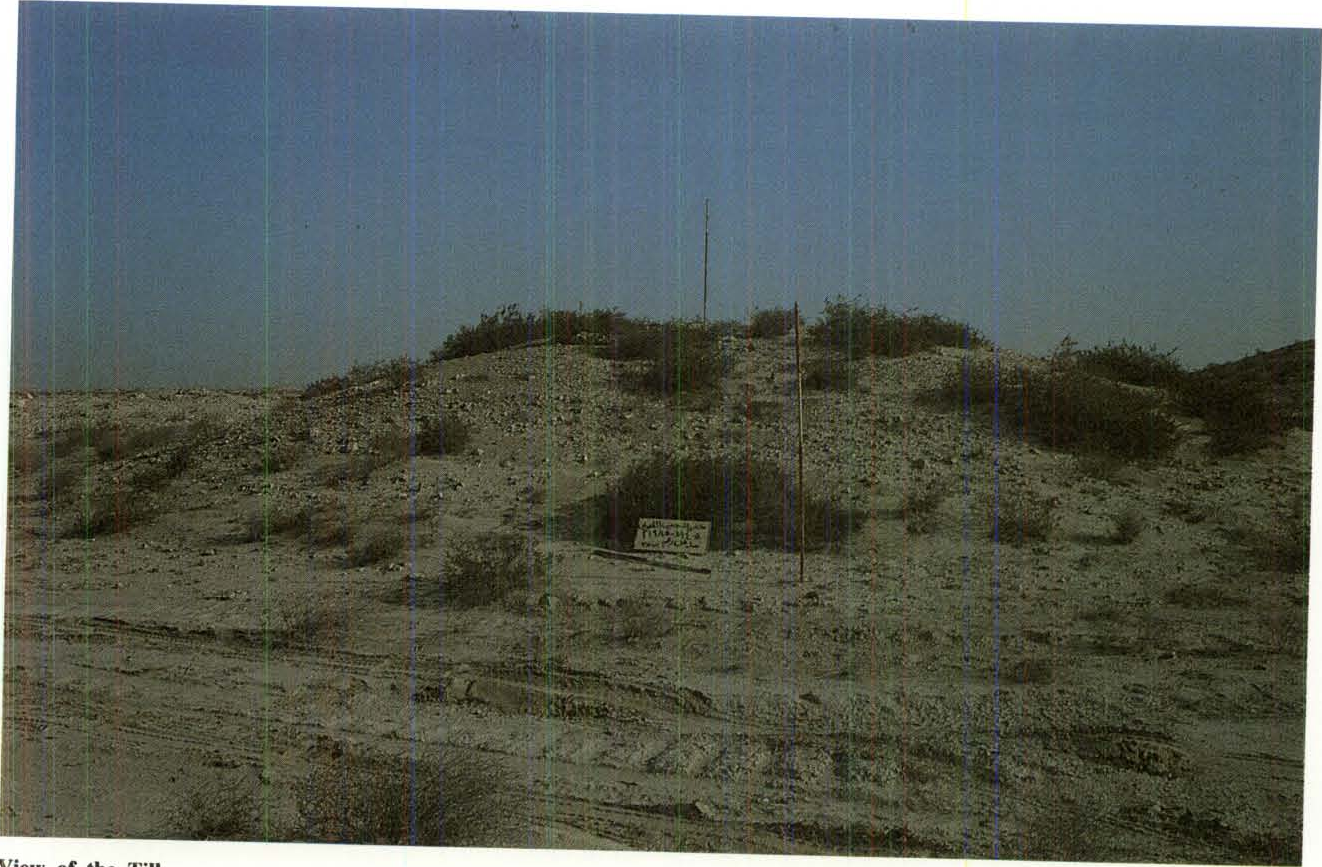

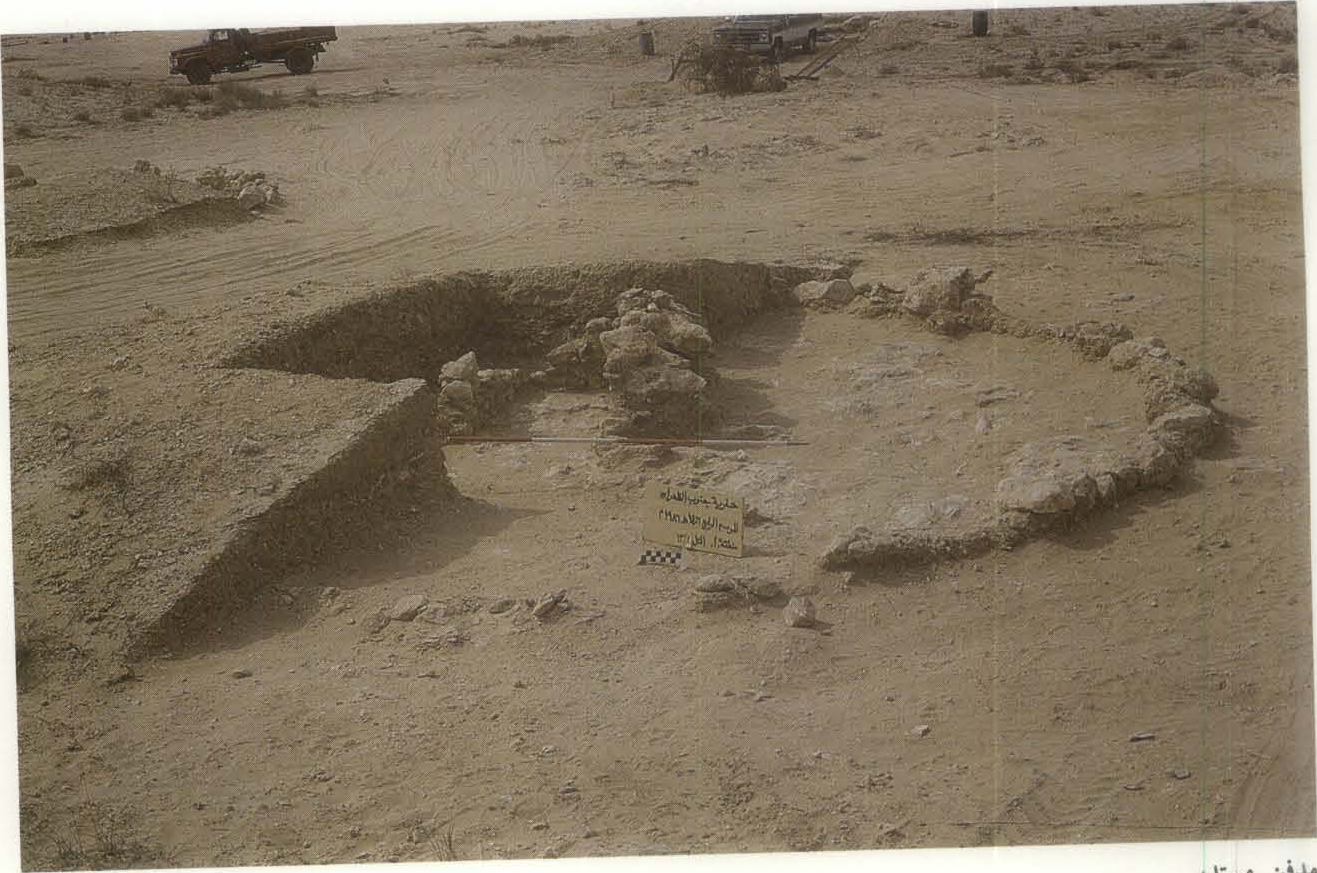

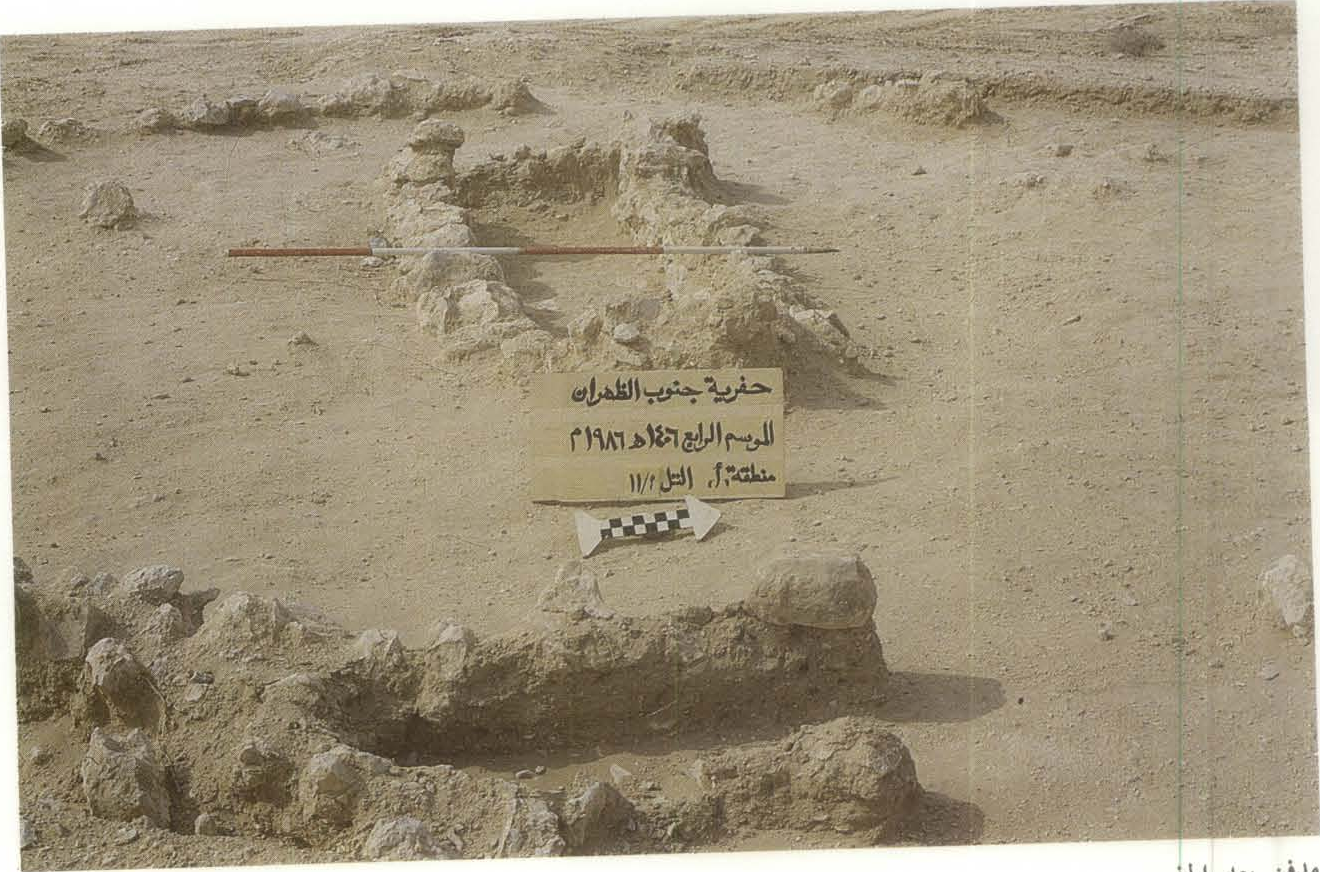

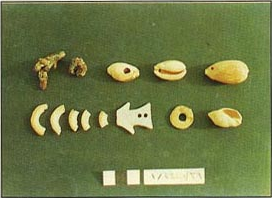

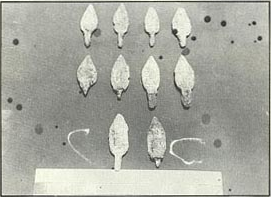

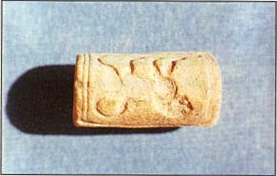

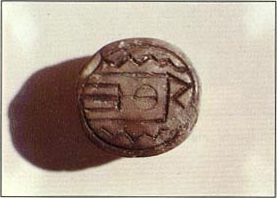

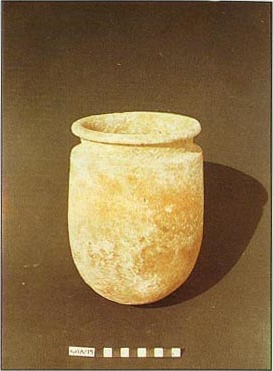

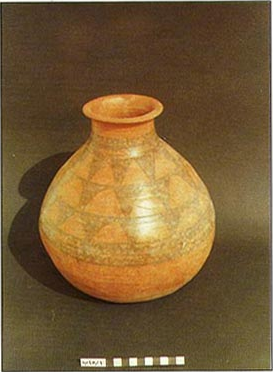

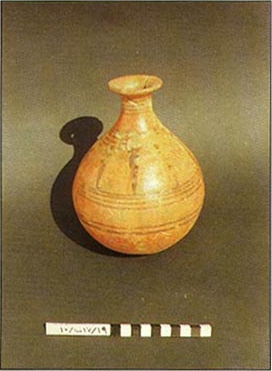

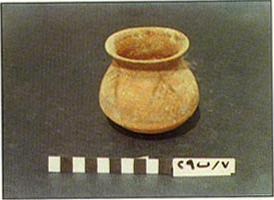

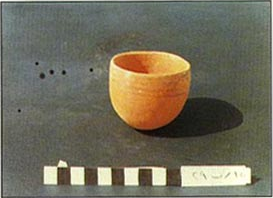

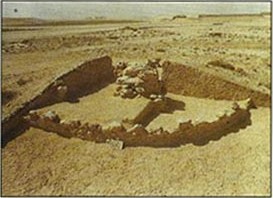

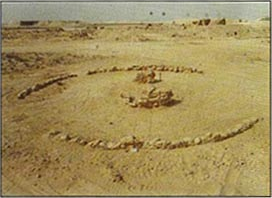
