= Siyadi House =

Historic residence in Muharraq City, Bahrain

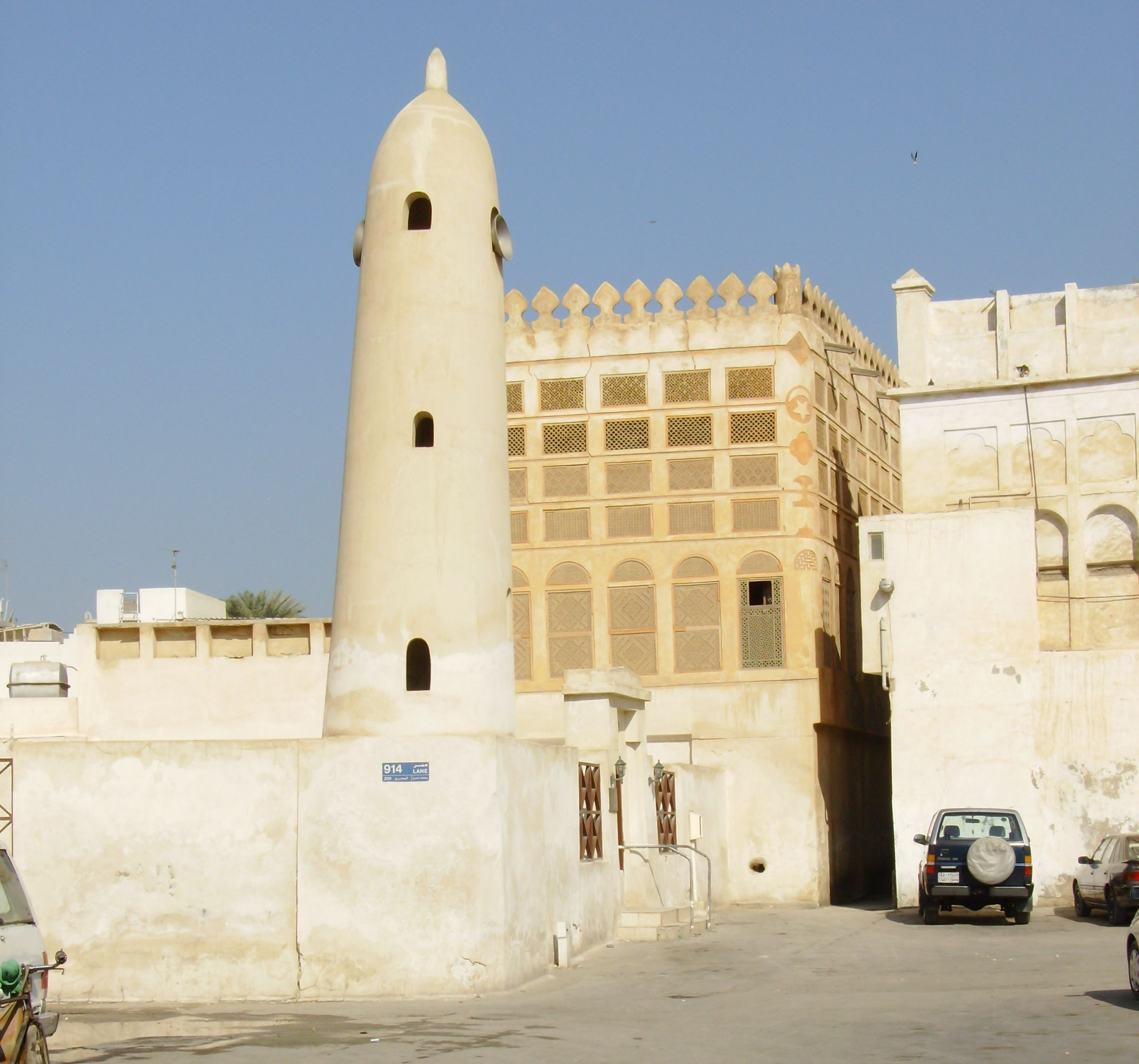
The Siyadi mosque and the Siyadi house behind it.

Siyadi House, also known as Bayt Siyadi (Arabic: بيت سيادي) is a historic building in Muharraq City, Kingdom of Bahrain. It is part of a larger complex of buildings constructed for the pearl merchant Abdullah bin Isa Siyadi, which further includes a mosque and a majlis. While the Siyadi House was built under Ahmad bin Jassim Siyadi, the construction of the Siyadi Majlis was initiated by Ahmad bin Jassim Siyadi and the Siyadi Mosque was a shared initiative of Isa and Jassim bin Yousif Siyadi. It is also part of the Bahrain pearling trail, the second UNESCO World Heritage Site in the country.

== History ==
The Siyadi family arrived to Bahrain in the early 19th century and settled close to the rulers’ houses in the Sh. Abdallah neighbourhood. The family's wealth originated from their involvement in the pearl trade, which blossomed in Muharraq in the 19th century.

== Architecture ==
The oldest part of the complex is Siyadi Mosque, which Isa and Jassim bin Yousif Siyadi donated to the Muharraq community in 1865. The original building was later revised and, according to Yarwood, the preserved structure dates to 1910. The Siyadi Mosque is the oldest preserved mosque in Muharraq and is still used for daily prayers.

Siyadi Majlis was constructed in two phases; the first phase initiated by Jassim bin Yousif Siyadi in 1850, which covered the ground floor and the upper-storey rooms constructed during the second phase in 1921. The largest part of the complex, Siyadi House is still used as a private residence and is inhabited by Abdallah bin Hassan Siyadi, the grandson of the builder Abdallah bin Isa Siyadi. It is not open to public and cannot be visited. The 450 square meters residence was the last construction and is dated to 1931.

The three buildings illustrate elaborate decorations of the late pearling era of Bahrain, in particular Siyadi Majlis has an inside room worth visiting. At present the Siyadi Majlis is under the responsibility of the Ministry of Culture, Bahrain.
