= Bu Maher Fort =

Fort in Halat Bu Maher, Bahrain

- قلعة بو ماهر (Arabic)
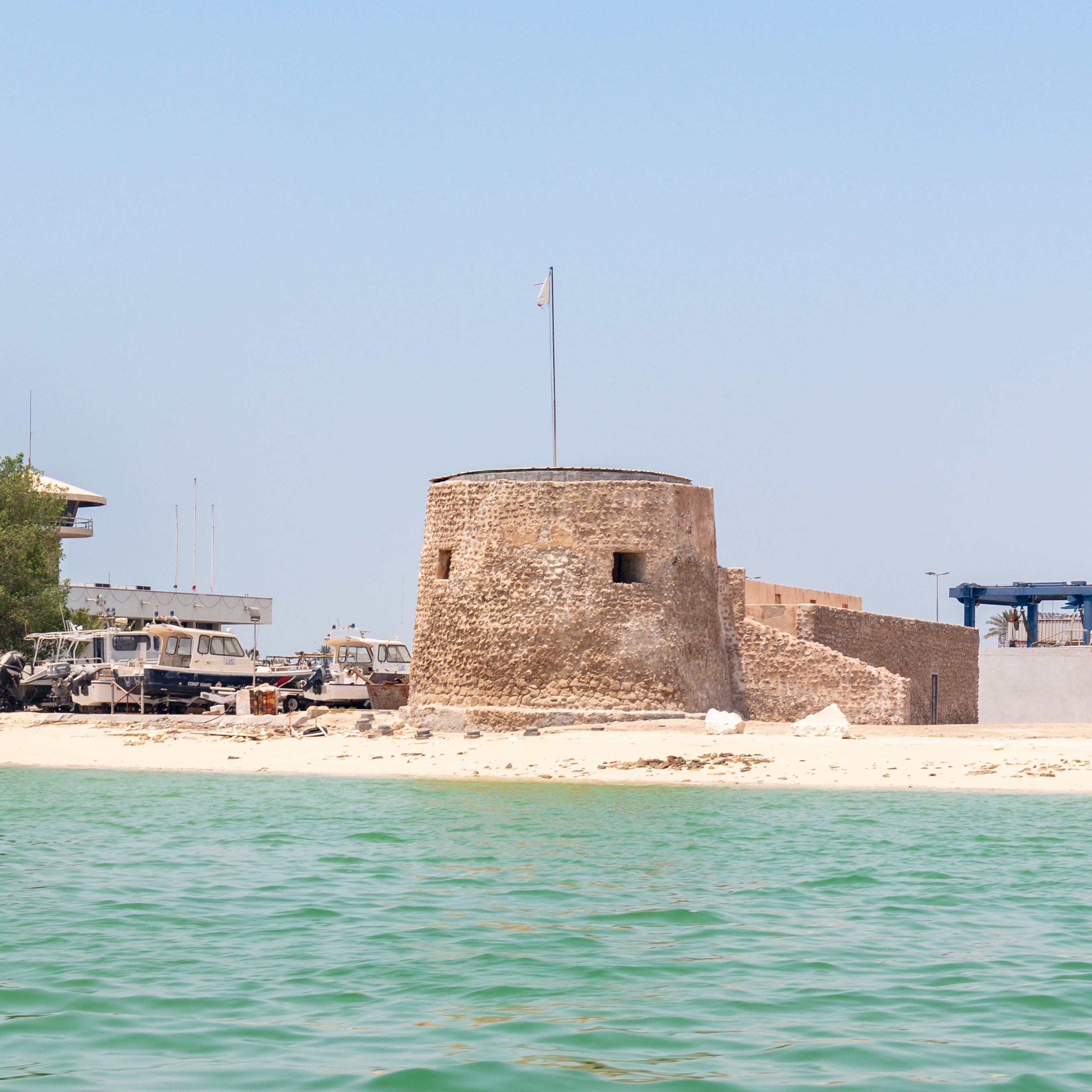
- Bu Maher Fort in 2024
- Interactive map of Bu Maher Fort
- 26°14′29″N 50°36′49″E
- Type: Fortification
- Cultures: Bahraini
- Location: Halat Bu Maher, Bahrain

History
- Built: 1840
- Abandoned: 1868

Site notes
- Material: Stone
- Height: 2.2 m (7 ft 3 in)
- Area: 2,800 m^{2} (30,000 sq ft)
- Management: Bahrain Authority for Culture and Antiquities

The Bu Maher Fort (Arabic: قلعة بو ماهر, sometimes called Abu Maher Fort) is a fort situated in Halat Bu Maher, in the Kingdom of Bahrain. In 2012, the fort was identified as part of the Bahrain Pearling Trail, a UNESCO World Heritage Site.

It was built in 1840 and abandoned in 1868.

== History ==
The fort was constructed in 1840 although its origins likely come from a 16th-century Portuguese fortification. An analysis of artefacts from the fort by an excavation team from Oxford Brookes University have suggested the site may have been first occupied from the Umayyad or early Abbasid era. There was also evidence of the site periodically being submerged underwater. The rectangular fort with four circular towers was built by Abdullah bin Ahmed Al Khalifa and served as a sister fort to Arad Fort, guarding the passageway of Muharraq Bay. In 1868, the fort was destroyed by British warships intervening in the Qatari–Bahraini War.

The island and fort were partially restored in 1930 to serve as a quarantine station for smallpox. The fort was further reconstructed in the 1970s by a Bahraini archaeological team and further archaeological excavations have since been conducted as recently as 2010. At present, the fort consists of a solitary tower.

== Today ==
The site is now adjacent to a coastguard base and can be visited from the Bahrain National Museum by a short boat ride. The fort currently boasts a visitor centre and is the starting point of the pearling trail.

== See also ==
- Bahrain pearling trail
- Arad Fort

== Citations ==
=== Bibliography ===
- Carter, Robert; Morley, Mike; Morse, Chaz. "Bu Maher Fort, Muharraq Report on Excavations in 2010 for the Ministry of Culture and Information, Bahrain" (PDF). Academia.edu. Oxford Brookes University.
