= Jawan Tomb =

Jawan Chamber Tomb
- مدفن جاوان (Arabic)
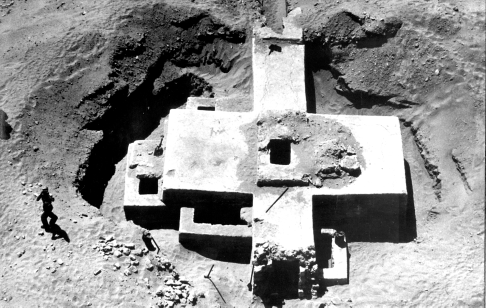

- Location within Saudi Arabia
- 26.71079947104911°N 49.961351140043625°E
- Type: tomb
- Location: Safwa, Saudi Arabia

The Jawan Tomb (Arabic: مدفن جاوان), a pre-Islamic chamber tomb, is a significant archaeological site located in Qatif Governorate in the Eastern Province of Saudi Arabia at the northwestern corner of Tarut Bay. Dating back to the 1st or 2nd century CE, the tomb reflects the region's rich history of trade and agriculture. The tomb was unearthed in 1952 by aramco during quarry operations. It remains one of the most well-preserved examples of ancient burial architecture in the region. The area is also historically known as "al-Junain" or "al-Junan" and is believed to correspond to the "Bilbana Settlement" mentioned in Ptolemy's maps, it covers around 200 hectares and spans several historical periods, from the 4th century BCE to the 6th century CE.

== Discovery ==
The tomb was discovered on March 22, 1952, during quarrying operations by the Arabian American Oil Company (ARAMCO). A bulldozer operator uncovered the structure while working in the Jawan quarry, located six kilometers north of Safwa. Upon discovering scattered human bones through an opening created by the machinery, work was immediately halted.

Thomas Barger, then head of Government Relations and later ARAMCO president (1959–1969), reported the finding to Federico S. Vidal of the Arabian Research division. Prince Saud bin Jiluwi, governor of the Eastern Province, subsequently authorized ARAMCO to oversee the archaeological excavation. The initial excavation lasted four and a half months, followed by eighteen months of laboratory studies.

== Architectural structure ==
The tomb’s design features a central rectangular chamber accessible via a long, westward passage. Five recesses extend from the chamber—two to the north, two to the south, and one to the east. Each recess contains burial pits, with the eastern recess housing two pits. Four additional rectangular burial structures are situated outside the central room.

The tomb was constructed from local limestone, with exterior rubble walls coated in plaster and interior walls made of precisely cut limestone blocks. These blocks were joined with minimal mortar, demonstrating advanced craftsmanship.

== Site ==
The Jawan Archaeological Site encompasses remnants of ancient buildings constructed from stone and mud, some plastered with white gypsum. It features small graves, pilaster fragments, and pottery shards. Among the significant finds is an inscribed slab in the Ancient South Arabian script (Musnad), marking the grave of a woman named Jashm Bint Amrah Bin Tahiyu of the Shadub tribe.

== See also ==
- Dilmun Burial Mounds
- Dhahran Burial Mounds
- Tomb of Eve

== Gallery ==
Jawan Chamber Tomb
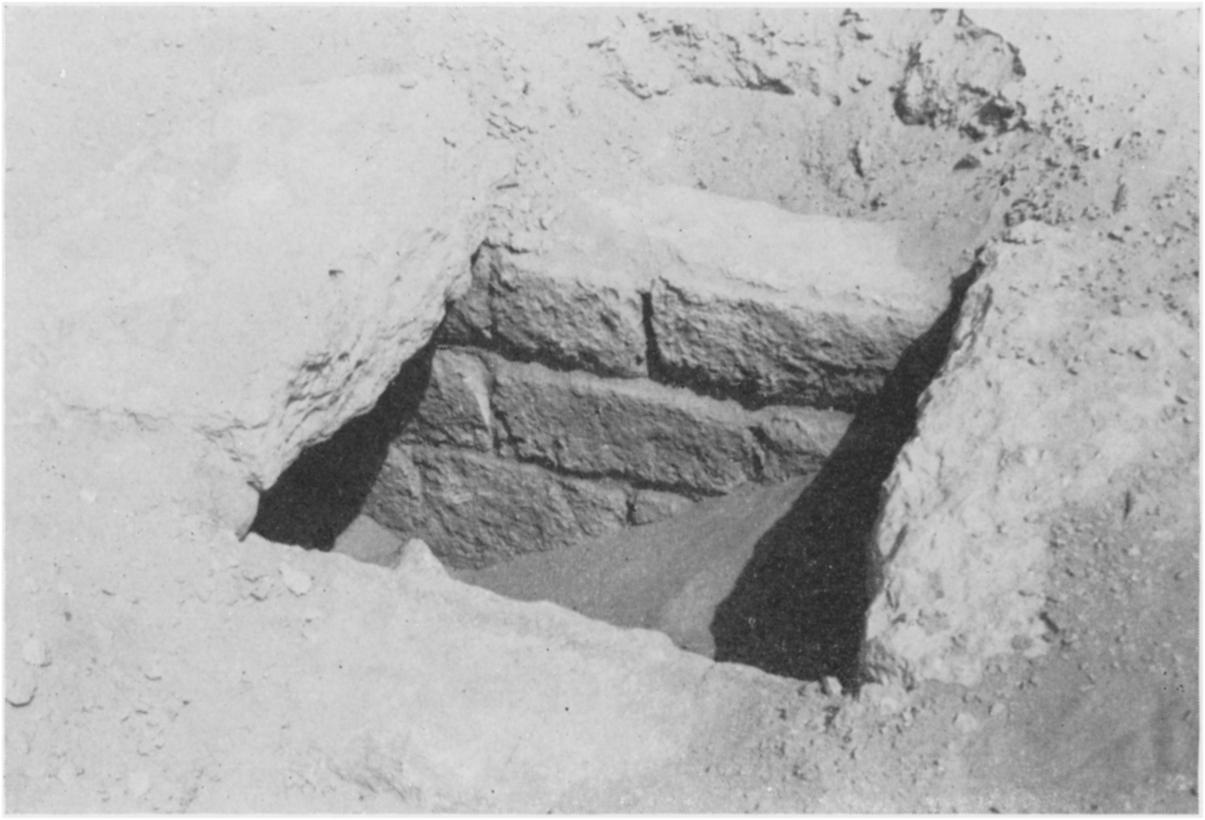
Block Cist at Ain Jawan

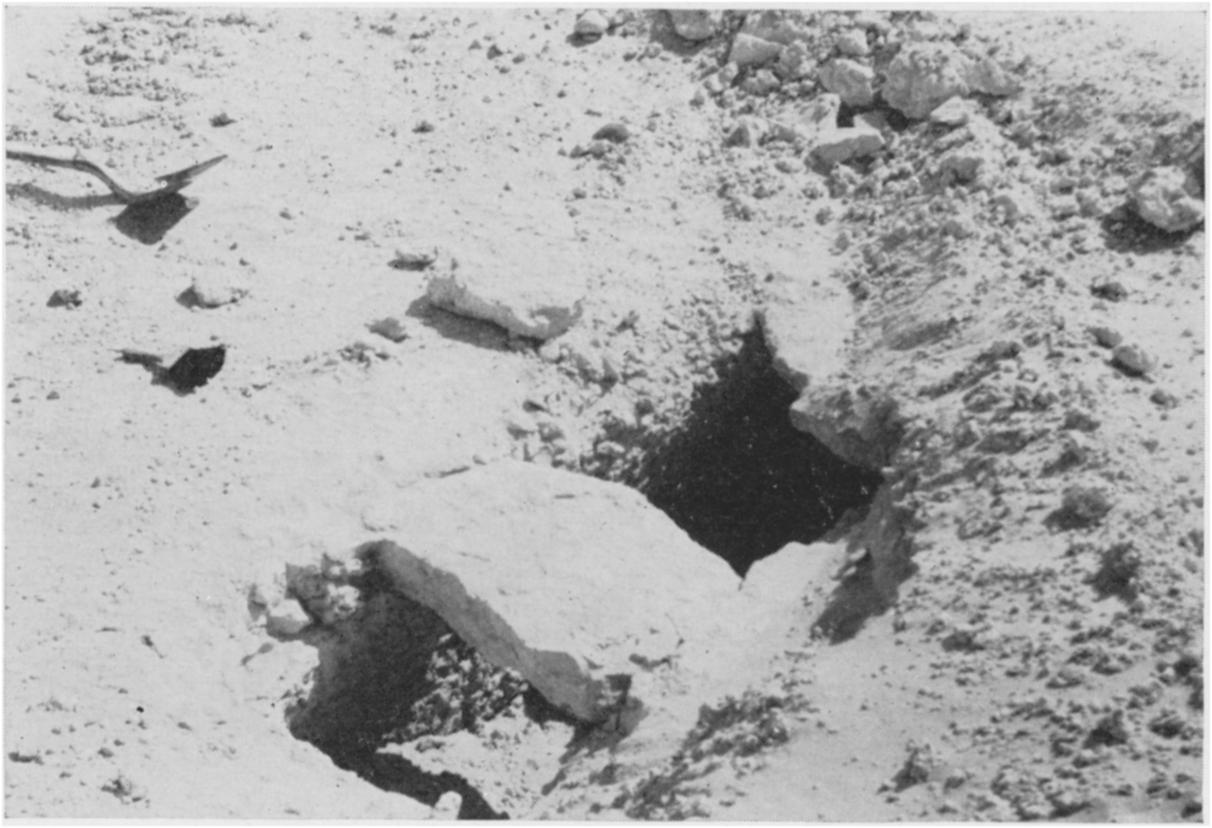
Covered Slit Cist (Tomb No. 5).

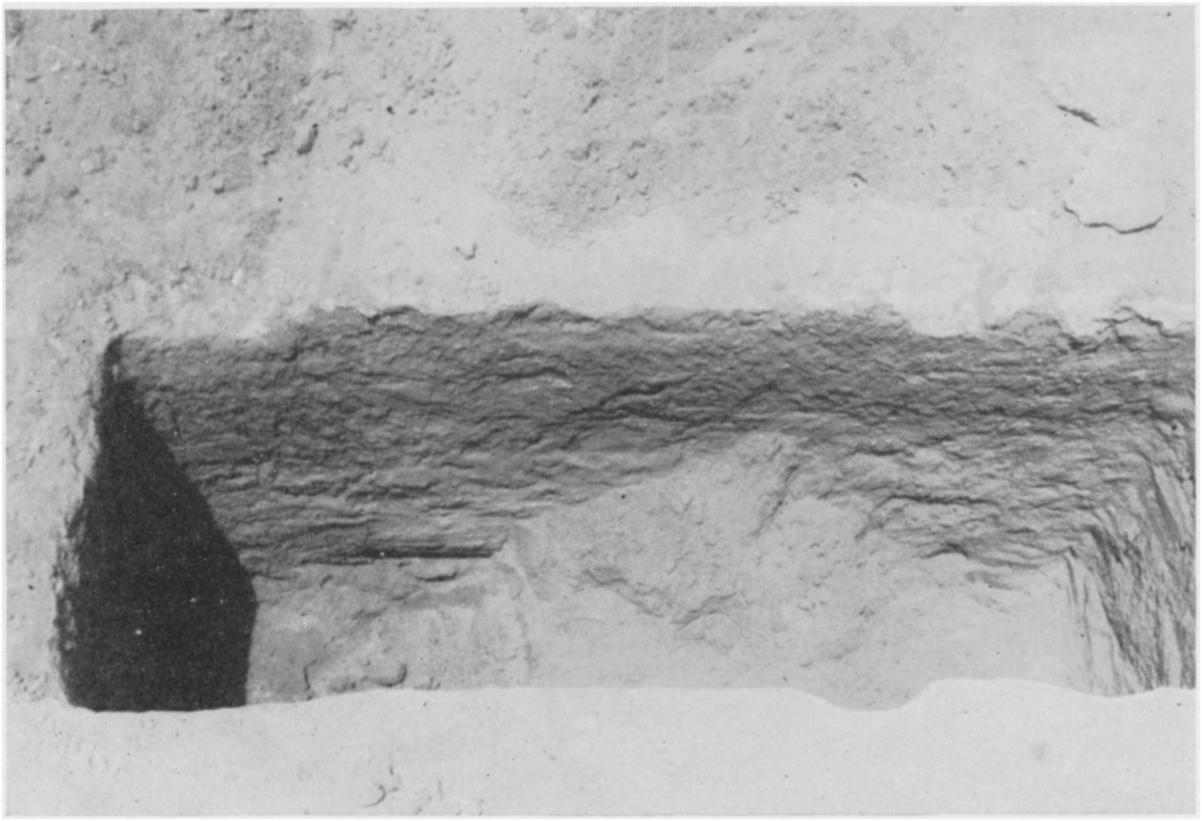
Covered Slit Cist at Ain Jawan (Tomb No. 4).

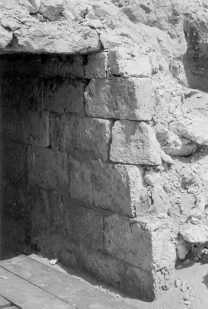
Detail of cut limestone blocks

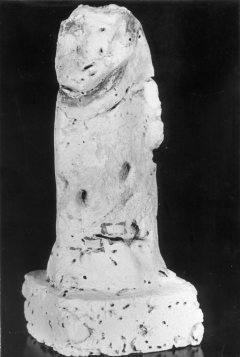
Gypsum statuette from the tomb of the Jawan girl
