= Bahrain Pearling Trail =

Pearling, Testimony of an Island Economy
UNESCO World Heritage Site
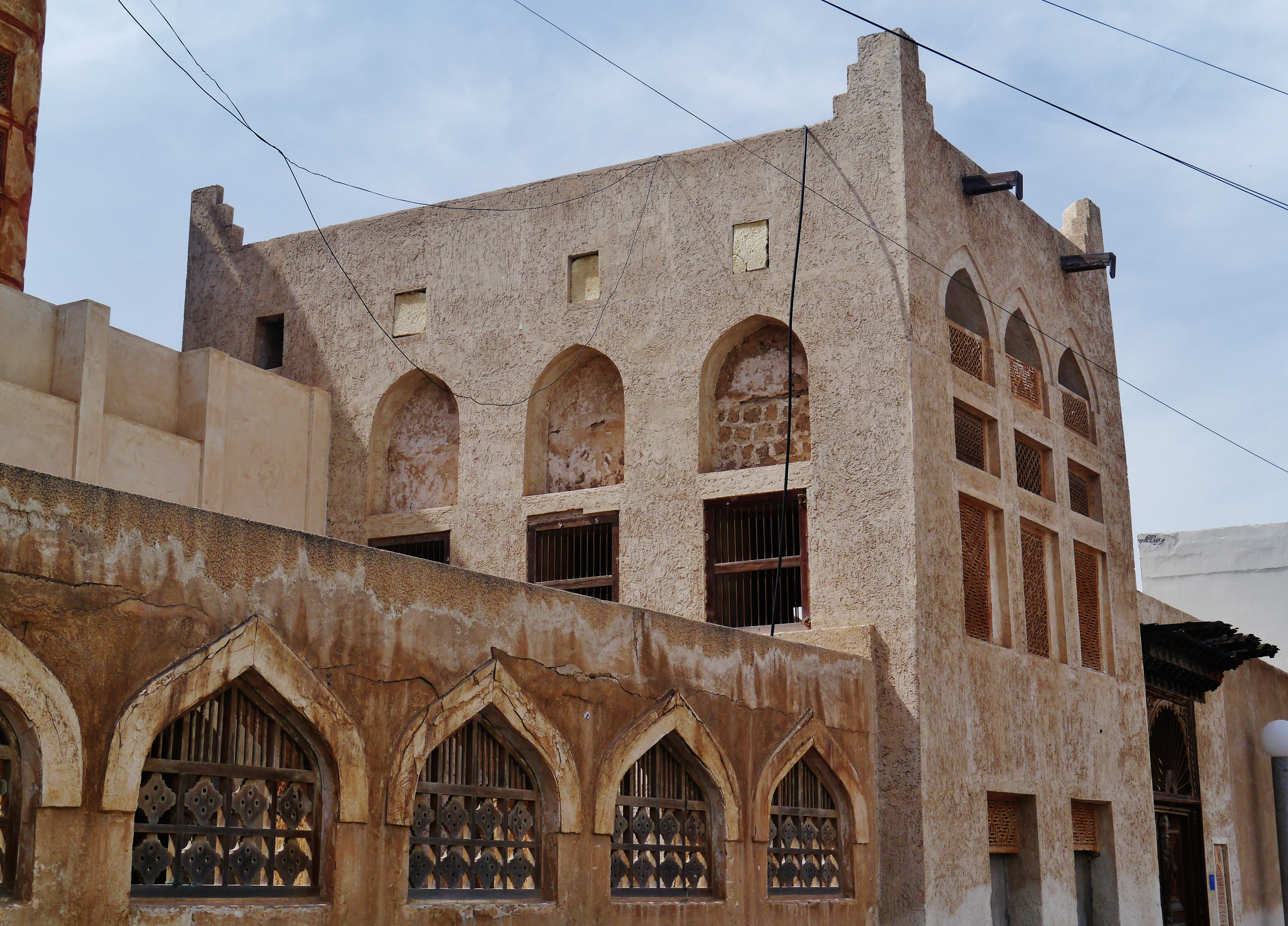

- Location within Bahrain Location within West and Central Asia
- Location: Bahrain
- Criteria: Cultural: (iii)
- Reference: 1364rev
- Inscription: 2012 (36th Session)
- Area: 35,086.81 ha (86,701.4 acres)
- Buffer zone: 95,876.44 ha (236,915.8 acres)
- Coordinates: 26°14′28.608″N 50°36′48.636″E

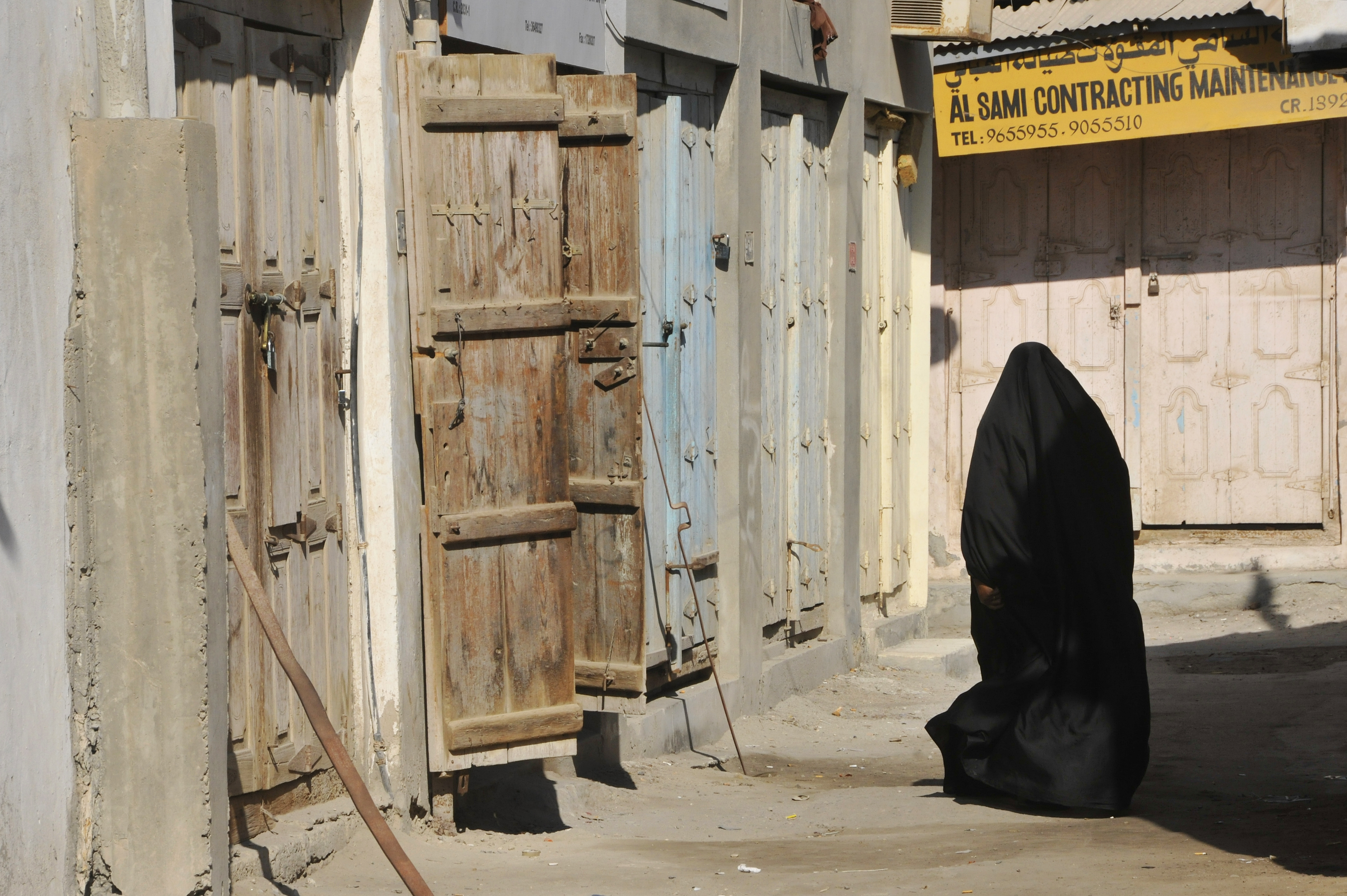
View of the Suq before restoration in Muharraq, part of the Pearling Path

The Bahrain Pearling Path (Arabic: مسار اللؤلؤ, romanized: Masār al-Luʼluʼ) is a serial cultural heritage site inscribed on the UNESCO World Heritage List on June 30, 2012. It consists of three oyster beds in the northern waters of Bahrain, a segment of the coast and the seafront Bu Mahir fort on the southern tip of Muharraq Island, and 17 buildings in historical section of Muharraq connected by a 3.5 km visitor pathway.

The site is Bahrain's second World Heritage Site after the Bahrain Fort. Though the site was inscribed under the label: "Pearling, testimony of an island economy" by the Bahrain Authority for Culture and Antiquities, the international media has consistently referred to it as the "Pearling Path". It qualifies as an open-air museum.

== Background ==
The Pearling Path is located in the Muharraq island, close to Bahrain's capital, Manama. It encompasses 330,000 square meters including oyster beds and buildings related to the 19th century pearl industry.

In 2013, the Bahrain Authority for Culture and Antiquities set out to preserve and revive the spirit of this historical area, highlighting its social and economic importance, especially in relation to the historical pearl trade. In addition to preserving and restoring historical structures, the urban regeneration project aims to ensure any new construction in the area is sensitive to heritage conservation and contemporary public space planning.

The revitalization project includes conservation projects, new buildings, and plans for public spaces along with social and economic mandates. As part of the project, the Bahrain Authority for Culture and Antiquities is maintaining the city's public areas, streets, car parking, facades and reintroducing contemporary programs.

== Landmarks ==
Visitors to the area can follow "The Path", a pathway extending 3.5 kilometers from the Bu Mahir seashore to Siyadi complex in the heart of Muharraq. This includes various buildings which were involved in the pearling economy, especially in the 19th century. The path also includes a modern-built visitor centre, 16 public squares, a number of cultural buildings and 4 car parking structures.

The buildings listed by UNESCO were the residences and majlises of pearl merchants, traders, divers, along with trade establishments, storage houses and the Siyadi family mosque. Among the restored buildings on the path is Bin Matar House, built in 1905 as the majlis of the pearl merchant Salman bin Hussain bin Matar and reopened in 2009 as a heritage house and art space.

== Historic significance ==
Pearl diving in Bahrain was first mentioned in Assyrian texts dating to 2000 BC, referring to "fish eyes" from Dilmun (ancient polity encompassing Bahrain). Bahrain (as Tylos, Bahrain's Greek name) was mentioned by Pliny to have been, "famous for the vast number of its pearls". The golden age of pearling is stated to have been between the 1850s to 1930, when pearls were more precious than diamonds and had attracted jewelers like Jacques Cartier to the country. In the interwar period the pearl trade was dominated by the Paris-based dealers Rosenthal, Pack, Mohammad Ali and Bienenfeld. After the beginning of World War II the market moved to Bombay.

There were around 30,000 pearl divers by the end of 1930, as pearling was the principal industry in Bahrain prior to the discovery of oil in 1932. After the collapse of the pearling industry, most divers switched to the newly founded oil sector. Currently, the trading of cultured pearls in Bahrain is prohibited. Few pearl divers remain today.

Muharraq was the capital and political centre of Bahrain in ancient times but older buildings have become damaged. In addition to the collapse of the pearl trade, the area had been at risk of losing some of its traditional crafts.

== Impact ==
After the older buildings were revitalized and back in use, they attracted people from other areas of Bahrain. UNESCO noted that the project has demonstrated collaboration between government, civil society and the private sector in Bahrain towards preserving the country's heritage.

Beyond its architectural and historical importance, the Muharraq revitalization project has stimulated growth and employment opportunities. Bahrain's ancient and traditional crafts were revived, including Kurar embroidery, which had almost become extinct. A new generation is learning these crafts to generate income.

== Recognition ==
UNESCO added the Bahrain Pearling Trail to its World Heritage list on June 30, 2012. UNESCO has stated that:

The site is the last remaining complete example of the cultural tradition of pearling and the wealth it generated at a time when the trade dominated the Gulf economy (2nd century to the 1930s when Japan developed cultured pearls). It also constitutes an outstanding example of traditional utilization of the sea’s resources and human interaction with the environment, which shaped both the economy and cultural identity of the island’s society.

— World Heritage Committee

The revitalization of Muharraq was one of six recipients of the 2019 Aga Khan Award for Architecture. It was recognized for its role in telling the history of the Arabian Peninsula pearl industry throughout the centuries, especially its peak in the 19th century. According to Farrokh Derakhshani, Director of the Aga Khan Award for Architecture, "The Revitalization of Muharraq is a visionary effort to maintain the spirit of this historic city. The project demonstrates a sensitive approach to heritage conservation and contemporary public space planning." The Aga Khan Award for Architecture recognised this project as being a community-based approach to urban regeneration, i.e. a project that brought along the contribution of contemporary architecture into the conservation of traditional buildings

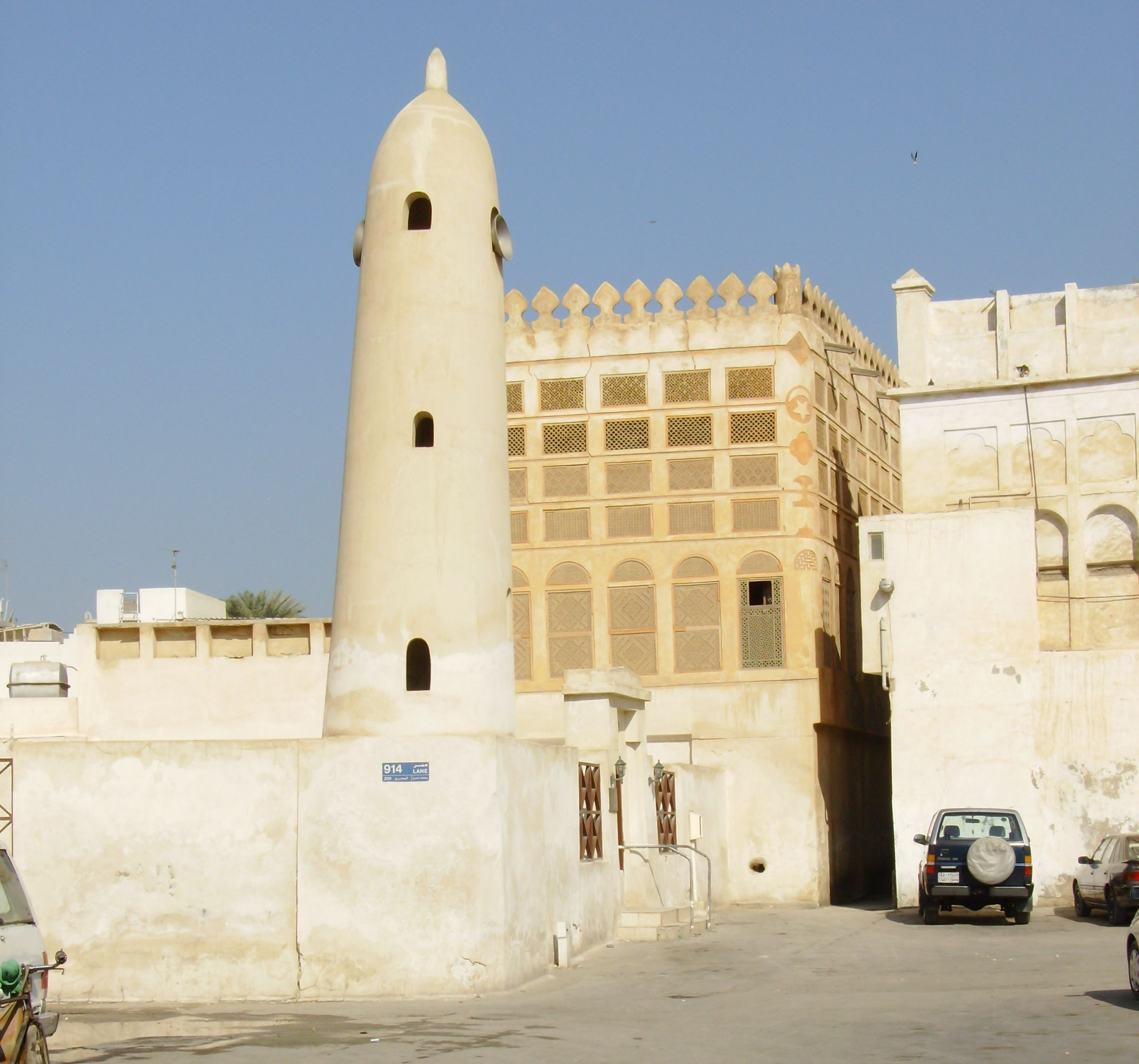
The Siyadi family mosque and majlis in the background
